= University of Maryland, Baltimore County student organizations =

The University of Maryland, Baltimore County funds a number of notable student-run organizations and clubs on campus.

== UMBC Chess ==
The UMBC chess team has won Pan-American Championships against fields with dozens of teams, including Ivy League institutions and other top competitors. Through 2002, the team had proven dominant in winning the Pan-American Intercollegiate Chess Championship six out of seven years. However, in the two following years it was upset in the tournament by its chief rival in chess, UT-Dallas. In 2005, UMBC defeated UT-Dallas en route to its third consecutive Final Four of College Chess. However, with this success certain aspects of the program have also drawn scrutiny. It has been reported that UMBC is only one of two schools (along with UT-Dallas) in the United States to offer major scholarship packages for chess proficiency, and was cited as a potential motivator in a WSJ article discussing the potential for firmer guidelines on eligibility for collegiate chess. The university hosted the 2006 Pan American Chess Championships, which were held at the Washington, D.C. Renaissance Hotel in late December. The team's most recent achievement was a third-place finish in the 2013 President's Cup behind UT-Dallas and the winners from Webster University in St. Louis.

== UMBC Mock Trial ==
UMBC Mock Trial began competing in 2011 within the American Mock Trial Association (AMTA), which governs intercollegiate Mock Trial. In 2015, UMBC Mock Trial earned the team's first bid to the Opening Round Championship Series (ORCS), which is the second level of sanctioned playoffs within AMTA. The team returned to ORCS in 2016, and advanced two teams to ORCS in 2017 and 2018. In 2017, UMBC Mock Trial earned their first ever bid to the AMTA National Championship Tournament, and finished in fourth place in the "A" division at the Yale University Mock Trial Invitational.

During the 2018-19 competitive season, UMBC Mock Trial won two invitational tournaments, finishing 7–1 at the Duke University Tobacco Road Invitational, and finishing a perfect 8–0 at the Georgetown University Hilltop Invitational. UMBC Mock Trial then earned their fifth consecutive bid to ORCS, and advanced to the 2019 AMTA National Championship Tournament. At the 2019 AMTA National Championship Tournament, UMBC earned their first top-ten finish in program history, finishing in eighth place in the Dr. Frank Guliuzza Division.

In 2016, UMBC Mock Trial co-hosted their first invitational tournament, the First Annual Charm City Classic Mock Trial Invitational, and co-hosted the Classic again in 2017. UMBC took sole ownership over the Classic in 2018 and hosted the third iteration of the tournament in October at the University of Maryland School of Law. In 2018, UMBC Mock Trial co-hosted their first AMTA Regional Tournament, along with Stevenson University. In 2019, UMBC and Stevenson co-hosted an AMTA Regional Tournament again.

== UMBC Debate ==
UMBC has a debate club that competes in American Parliamentary Debate Association tournaments. The club is open to all UMBC undergraduate and graduate students and does not hold try outs for the team. Since its re-inception in 2009, UMBC has had an annual spot in hosting an APDA sanctioned tournament.

== Greek life ==
=== Inter-Fraternity Council ===
Active

- Lambda Chi Alpha
- Pi Kappa Phi
- Phi Kappa Sigma
- Tau Kappa Epsilon

Dormant

- Alpha Epsilon Pi
- Alpha Tau Omega
- Phi Kappa Psi
- Sigma Alpha Epsilon
- Sigma Phi Epsilon
- Tau Epsilon Phi
- Triangle Fraternity
- Zeta Beta Tau

=== Panhellenic Association ===
Active

- Alpha Sigma Alpha
- Alpha Sigma Kappa
- Delta Phi Epsilon
- Phi Mu
- Phi Sigma Sigma

Dormant

- Sigma Sigma Sigma

=== Panhellenic Council ===
Active

- Alpha Phi Alpha
- Alpha Kappa Alpha
- Kappa Alpha Psi
- Delta Sigma Theta
- Phi Beta Sigma

Dormant

- Iota Phi Theta
- Omega Psi Phi
- Sigma Gamma Rho
- Zeta Phi Beta

=== Multicultural Greek Council ===
Active

- alpha Kappa Delta Phi
- Iota Nu Delta
- Lambda Phi Epsilon
- Lambda Theta Alpha

Dormant

- Alpha Nu Omega
- Kappa Phi Lambda
- Lambda Theta Phi
- Delta Phi Omega
- Sigma Alpha Epsilon Pi
- Sigma Beta Rho
- Zeta Sigma Chi

== The Retriever ==
The Retriever (formerly The Retriever Weekly) is a student newspaper serving the UMBC student, faculty, and staff body. It is published in biweekly editions both in print and online, and covers campus events, athletics, visual and performing arts, popular entertainment, and political commentary. The editorial staff consists of an Editor-in-Chief, Managing Editors, and section editors for News, Opinion, Arts & Culture, Sports, Student Life, and Photography. The staff also includes several layout assistants and copy editors, as well as Business and Technology departments.

== Student government ==
=== Graduate Student Association ===
The Graduate Student Association represents all graduate students at UMBC. The association serves as a bridge between the graduate student body and the larger campus community.

=== UMBC Student Government Association ===
The Student Government Association (SGA) represents all undergraduate students at UMBC. The SGA meets with key administrators and approves campus wide policies in support of undergraduate student issues. Student body elections are held annually in the spring. The current President of the Student Government Association is Vrinda Deshpande.
