= List of Michigan State University fraternities and sororities =

Following is a list of Michigan State University fraternities and sororities.

== National Panhellenic Conference ==
The following members of the National Panhellenic Conference have a chapter at Michigan State.

- Alpha Chi Omega
- Alpha Omicron Pi
- Alpha Phi
- Alpha Xi Delta
- Chi Omega
- Delta Gamma
- Gamma Phi Beta
- Kappa Alpha Theta
- Kappa Delta
- Kappa Kappa Gamma
- Pi Beta Phi
- Sigma Delta Tau
- Sigma Kappa
- Zeta Tau Alpha

== North American Interfraternity Conference ==
The following members of the North American Interfaternity Conference (IFC) have a chapter at Michigan State.

- Alpha Epsilon Pi
- Alpha Gamma Rho
- Alpha Kappa Psi
- Alpha Sigma Phi
- Beta Theta Pi
- Delta Kappa Epsilon
- Delta Sigma Phi
- FarmHouse
- Kappa Sigma
- Lambda Phi Epsilon
- Phi Delta Theta
- Phi Gamma Delta
- Phi Kappa Psi
- Phi Kappa Sigma
- Phi Kappa Tau
- Pi Kappa Alpha
- Pi Kappa Phi
- Psi Upsilon
- Sigma Alpha Epsilon
- Sigma Alpha Mu
- Sigma Beta Rho
- Sigma Nu
- Sigma Pi
- Tau Kappa Epsilon
- Theta Chi
- Theta Delta Chi
- Triangle Fraternity
- Zeta Beta Tau
- Zeta Psi

== National Pan-Hellenic Council ==
The following chapters of the National Pan-Hellenic Council have a chapter at Michigan State.

- Alpha Phi Alpha
- Alpha Kappa Alpha
- Kappa Alpha Psi
- Omega Psi Phi
- Delta Sigma Theta
- Phi Beta Sigma
- Zeta Phi Beta
- Sigma Gamma Rho
- Iota Phi Theta

== National Multicultural Greek Council ==
The following members of the National Multicultural Greek Council have a chapter at Michigan State.

- Delta Xi Phi
- Lambda Theta Alpha
- Phi Iota Alpha
- alpha Kappa Delta Phi
- Alpha Phi Gamma
- Delta Tau Lambda
- Sigma Iota Alpha
- Sigma Lambda Beta
- Sigma Lambda Gamma
