= List of Carnegie Mellon University fraternities and sororities =

The Greek tradition at Carnegie Mellon University began 114 years ago with the founding of Theta Xi in 1912. As of the 2022 fall semester, 14% of the university's undergraduate men were members of a fraternity, and 11% of the undergraduate women were members of a sorority. Following is a list of Carnegie Mellon University fraternities and sororities, organized by national umbrella organization or type.

== Interfraternity Council ==
The Interfraternity Council has the following fraternities on campus.

- Alpha Epsilon Pi
- Alpha Sigma Phi
- Phi Delta Theta
- Pi Kappa Alpha
- Sigma Alpha Epsilon
- Sigma Chi
- Sigma Nu
- Sigma Phi Epsilon

== Multicultural Greek Council ==
The Multicultural Greek Council has the following members on campus.

- alpha Kappa Delta Phi (sorority)
- Kappa Phi Lambda (sorority)
- Lambda Phi Epsilon (fraternity)

== National Pan-Hellenic Council ==
The National Pan-Hellenic Council has the following members on campus.

- Alpha Kappa Alpha
- Alpha Phi Alpha
- Delta Sigma Theta
- Kappa Alpha Psi

== Panhellenic Council ==
The Panhellenic Council has the following sororities on campus.

- Alpha Chi Omega
- Alpha Phi
- Delta Delta Delta
- Delta Gamma
- Kappa Alpha Theta
- Kappa Kappa Gamma

== Non-social organizations ==
=== Professional fraternities ===
- Alpha Kappa Psi (co-ed)
- Sigma Alpha Iota (women)

=== Service fraternities ===
- Alpha Phi Omega (co-ed)
