= Alpha Phi Gamma =

Alpha Phi Gamma may refer to:

- Alpha Phi Gamma (sorority), an Asian-interest sorority
- Alpha Phi Gamma (honor society) journalism honor society that merged to form the Society for Collegiate Journalists
