= LFE =

The word LFE may refer to:

- Low-frequency effects, a channel used in surround sound
- Lambda Phi Epsilon, a nationally recognized Asian-interest fraternity based in the United States
- Leicester Forest East, a settlement community to the west of Leicester, UK
- Lisp Flavoured Erlang, a dialect of Erlang with Lisp-like syntax
- Laminar Flow Element, a device used to smooth and help measure mass air flow.
