= Pi Alpha Phi =

Asian-American-interest collegiate fraternity (1929–2023)

- ΠΑΦ
- Founded: February 1, 1929; 97 years ago UC Berkeley
- Type: Social
- Affiliation: Independent
- Former affiliation: NAPA
- Status: Defunct
- Defunct date: August 1, 2023
- Emphasis: Cultural interest - Asian American
- Scope: National
- Motto: "A Tradition of Excellence Since 1929"
- Pillars: Academic excellence, Asian awareness, brotherhood, leadership, and philanthropy
- Colors: Berkeley Blue; California Gold
- Symbol: Brotherhood Links
- Mascot: Phoenix
- Philanthropy: Jade Ribbon Campaign
- Chapters: 28
- Nickname: P-A-Phi's, Pineapples
- Headquarters: Indianapolis, Indiana 46230; United States
- Website: www.pialphaphi.com

Pi Alpha Phi Fraternity, Inc. (ΠΑΦ, also Pi Alpha Phi or PAPhi) was an American university-level fraternity. It was founded in 1929 at the University of California, Berkeley. On August 1, 2023, Pi Alpha Phi Fraternity announced that it was closing all of its chapters. At the time, it was the oldest active Asian-American interest fraternity in the United States. It was a founding member of the National APIDA Panhellenic Association.

== History ==
=== Origins ===
When Pi Alpha Phi was founded in the 1920s, traditional Greek letter fraternities along with the rest of the nation, legally discriminated against men of color. In 1928, Wing C. Chan, Dong Wing Tom, and Elmer Leong, members of the class of 1930 at the University of California, Berkeley, had the idea to start a fraternity for the several hundred students of Chinese descent. Six students signed the fraternity's charter in both Chinese and English, officially establishing Pi Alpha Phi on February 1, 1929.

The six founders of Pi Alpha Phi were D. Wing Tom, Wing Chan, Elmer Leong, Chack Chan, Tim Jang, and George Lee. All were born in America except Wing Chan, who came from China at an early age. Wing Chan became the fraternity's first president.

Because they were banned from joining traditional Greek letter fraternities, Pi Alpha Phi's founding fathers wanted to ensure that Asian-American awareness would be an important part of the fraternity. The fraternity encouraged its members to learn Asian-American culture, heritage, and history and to share this knowledge with others. In its later years, the basic premise of the fraternity remained largely unchanged. The fraternity was open to people of all ethnic backgrounds but retained its Asian-American character.

=== Expansion ===
The local fraternity became national with the addition of its Beta chapter at the Stony Brook University in 1990. This was followed by Gamma chapter at University of California, Davis that same year. More chapters followed in California and Michigan through 2000. The fraternity's first annual convention was hosted by the Epsilon chapter in Arcadia, California in 2000.

The fraternity continued to charter chapters, expanding into Arizona, North Carolina, and Washington. Pi Alpha Phi was a founding member of the National APIDA Panhellenic Association in 2005. In 2014, Pi Alpha Phi had active ten chapters, one associate chapter, and six colonies. It was headquartered in Indianapolis, Indiana.

=== Scandals and dissolution ===
In July 2020, the National Board of Directors placed a national moratorium on chapter activities in response to "multiple reports of sexual misconduct nationwide." The moratorium was lifted but, a pledge, Phat Nguyen, died and three others were hospitalized after a hazing incident at Michigan State University on November 19, 2021. Nine fraternity members were charged in connection with the death. In June 2023, the family of the deceased student filed a wrongful death suit against the fraternity.

On August 1, 2023, Pi Alpha Phi Fraternity announced the closure of all of its collegiate chapters. The fraternity said that its chapters were unsustainable because of the impact of the COVID-19 pandemic, declining university enrollment, and financial pressures. Not all chapters agreed with this decision. Some chapters attempted to stay open or tried to start a new organization; although, the former was prohibited by the national fraternity. At the time of its closure, Pi Alpha Phi was the oldest active Asian-American interest fraternity in the United States.

The National APIDA Panhellenic Association removed Pi Alpha Phi from its membership roles on October 13, 2023. NAPA said, "Pi Alpha Phi Fraternity, Inc. has contributed to the vibrant Greek life on campuses nationwide and served as a chartering organization of NAPA in 2005. Their dedication to fostering academic excellence, Asian American awareness, brotherhood, leadership, and philanthropy has left a lasting mark on our fraternity and sorority community." Some of the fraternity's materials are archived at the University of Illinois Urbana-Champaign.

== Symbols ==
The name Pi Alpha Phi was derived from the initials of the Greek phrase meaning "To advance through brotherly ties; the thirst for learning." The colors of Pi Alpha Phi were Berkeley Blue and California Gold. Its mascot was the phoenix. Its symbol was the Brotherhood Links. The five pillars of the fraternity were academic excellence, Asian awareness, brotherhood, leadership, and philanthropy. Its motto is "A tradition of excellence since 1929". The group's nicknames were PAPhi and Pineapples.

== Activities ==
From the mid-1980s to 2002, Pi Alpha Phi participated in the San Francisco Chinese New Year Parade, operating the “Pi Alpha Phi Dragon”.

The fraternity awarded the annual Herbert Gee Scholarship, named in honor of an Alpha chapter founder. The scholarship was funded by alumni and was award to an active member of the fraternity.

The fraternity's national philanthropy was the Jade Ribbon Campaign which promoted hepatitis awareness and discussed the health disparity between Asian Americans and white Americans. Chapters also supported charities in their local, such Habitat for Humanity and Christmas charities for children.

== Chapters ==
Following is a list of the former Pi Alpha Phi collegiate chapters.

Chapter	Charter date and range	Institution	City	State	Status	Ref.
Alpha	February 1, 1929 – April 25, 2005; 200x ? – 2013	University of California, Berkeley	Berkeley	California	Inactive	(Note: In April 2005, the university placed the chapter on temporary suspension for hazing. In July 2005, the university made the suspension official, banning the chapter from campus until July 2006. In 2013, the chapter was suspended by the national fraternity.)
Beta	1990–1992	Stony Brook University	Stony Brook	New York	Inactive	
Gamma	May 1, 1990 – August 2012	University of California, Davis	Davis	California	Inactive	(Note: In August 2012, the university banned the fraternity for at least five years after incidents involving providing false information, serving alcohol to minors, and hazing. The national fraternity revoked the chapter's charter in September 2012. However, the chapter continued to operate sub rosa after this date.)
Delta	1991 – January 23, 2003	San Jose State University	San Jose	California	Inactive	(Note: The university expelled the fraternity for at least ten years after it brawled with another fraternity in January 2002, resulting in the stabbing death of a student. The chapter was recolonized in 2012.)
Epsilon	1993–2012	University of California, Riverside	Riverside	California	Inactive	(Note: The university banned the chapter for hazing and failure to comply with university sanctions.)
Zeta	March 5, 1995 – 2021	University of California, Santa Cruz	Santa Cruz	California	Inactive	(Note: The university dismissed the chapter for risk management violations including hazing.)
Eta	September 16, 1998 – 2011; 2016–2022	University of California, Irvine	Irvine	California	Inactive	(Note: The national fraternity pulled the chapter's charter in the spring of 2022.)
Theta	August 20, 2000 – August 1, 2023	University of California, San Diego	La Jolla	California	Inactive	
Iota	2000–2023	University of Michigan	Ann Arbor	Michigan	Inactive	
Kappa	November 11, 2002 – August 1, 2023	University of Arizona	Tucson	Arizona	Inactive	
Lambda					Inactive	
Mu	2003 – December 5, 2021	Michigan State University	East Lansing	Michigan	Inactive	(Note: Chapter was suspended for a minimum of ten years, by the national fraternity and the university, following the hazing death of a pledge.)
Nu	2003–before August 2022	University of North Carolina at Chapel Hill	Chapel Hill	North Carolina	Inactive	
Xi	2004 – August 1, 2023	University of Washington	Seattle	Washington	Inactive	
Omicron	2006 – March 22, 2023	University of California, Santa Barbara	Santa Barbara	California	Inactive	(Note: The national fraternity closed the chapter.)
Pi	2011 – August 1, 2023	University of Iowa	Iowa City	Iowa	Inactive	
Rho	January 19, 2013 – before August 2022	University of North Carolina at Charlotte	Charlotte	North Carolina	Inactive	(Note: Chapter started In the spring of 2011 as BIGAPE, which stands for Brotherhood Interest Group Asian Pi Alpha Phi Expansion. It became an official colony in the fall of 2012.)
Sigma	2013 – October 29, 2018	Northwestern University	Evanston	Illinois	Inactive	(Note: The university suspended the chapter for three years for violating alcohol policies, including serving alcohol to minors. Before being suspended, the chapter had been placed on probation two times in two years.)
Tau	2016–before August 2022	North Carolina State University	Raleigh	North Carolina	Inactive	(Note: Chapter started as a colony in June 2011 and was chartered in 2016.)
Upsilon	2012 – August 1, 2023	San Francisco State University	San Francisco	California	Inactive	
Phi	2014–before August 2022	Drexel University	Philadelphia	Pennsylvania	Inactive	
Chi	June 15, 2017 – August 1, 2023	Clemson University	Clemson	South Carolina	Inactive	(Note: Chapter started as a colony on April 15, 2017.)
Psi	2019 – August 1, 2023	Iowa State University	Ames	Iowa	Inactive	(Note: Chapter was created as a colony in 2014.)
Alpha Alpha	2020–20xx ?; March 2018 – August 1, 2023	University of Buffalo	Buffalo	New York	Inactive	
	20xx ?– before August 2022	University Nevada, Las Vegas	Paradise	Nevada	Inactive	(Note: Formed as a colony on November 17, 2013.)
	20xx ?– before August 2022	University of Delaware	Newark	New Jersey	Inactive	(Note: Formed as a colony in 2014.)
	20xx ?– before August 2022	University of Maryland, College Park	College Park	Maryland	Inactive	(Note: Formed as a colony in 2018.)
Colony		Arizona State University	Tempe	Arizona	Inactive	(Note: Formed as a colony in 2014 or 2015.)
Colony		University of North Carolina at Greensboro	Greensboro	North Carolina	Inactive	(Note: Formed as a colony in the spring of 2019. It was a co-ed chapter.)
Colony		University of South Carolina	Columbia	South Carolina	Inactive	(Note: Formed as a colony in October 2021.)

== Alumni clubs ==
The fraternity had alumni clubs in the United States and Asia.

United States	Asia
Iowa; Los Angeles; Puerto Rico; San Jose; South Carolina; Washington, D.C.; Maryland; Virginia	Guangdong, China; Hong Kong; Singapore; South Korea; Taiwan; Thailand; Vietnam

== Notable members ==
- Evan Jackson Leong — filmmaker and director
- Delbert Wong — Retired Superior Court judge, the first person of Chinese descent appointed to the judiciary in the continental United States. Appointed as the special master in the O.J. Simpson murder trial.

== Member and chapter misconduct ==
- On January 21, 2003, the San Jose State chapters of Pi Alpha Phi and the Lambda Phi Epsilon fraternity turned their rivalry into a brawl. The fight involved around 100 people, including Pi Alpha Phi members of the University of California, Santa Cruz who had been recruited to participate. Four people were stabbed in the incident. A member of Lambda Phi Epsilon was killed while trying to stop the fight, and others were seriously injured and were taken to the hospital.
- Phat Nguyen, a pledge, died and three others were taken to the hospital after a hazing incident involving the forced consumption of alcohol at the Michigan State University chapter on November 19, 2021. Nine fraternity members were changed in connection with the death. In June 2023, the family of the deceased student filed a wrongful death suit against the fraternity.

== See also ==
- Cultural interest fraternities and sororities
- List of hazing deaths in the United States
- List of social fraternities and sororities
- List of Asian American fraternities and sororities
