= Alpha Iota Omicron =

American South Asian interest fraternity

- ΑΙΟ
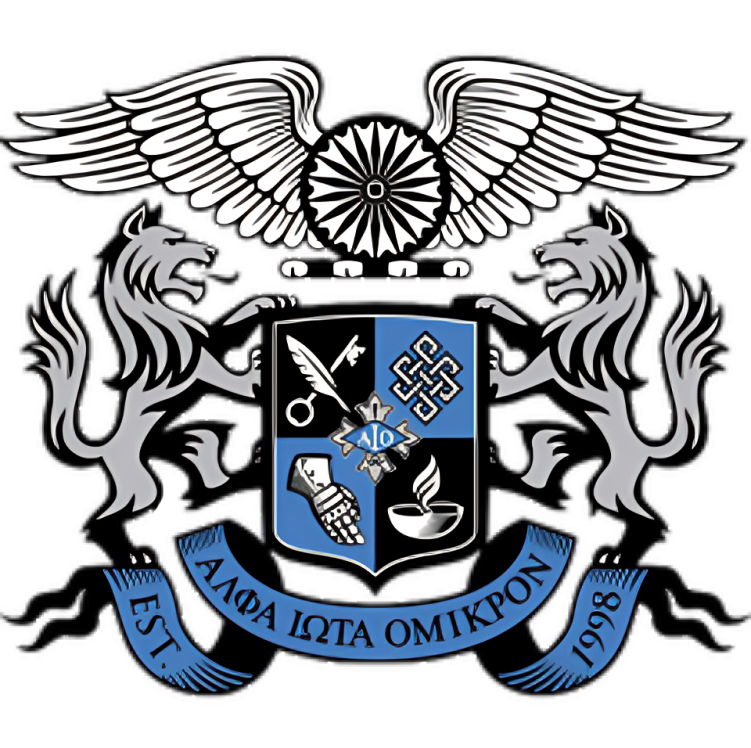
- Founded: October 16, 1998; 27 years ago University of Michigan
- Type: Social
- Former affiliation: APIA Greek Alliance
- Status: Active
- Emphasis: South Asian
- Scope: National
- Motto: Sic Parvis Magna
- Pillars: Brotherhood, Networking, Community Service, Cultural Competence
- Colors: Black, Blue, and Silver
- Mascot: Wolf
- Chapters: 1 active
- Colonies: 3
- Nickname: AIO
- Headquarters: United States

Alpha Iota Omicron (ΑΙΟ) is a South Asian interest and multicultural collegiate fraternity located in the United States. It was established at University of Michigan in 1998 and has chartered ten chapters in the United States and Canada. Alpha Iota Omicron was a founding member of the APIA Greek Alliance, the former name of the National APIDA Panhellenic Association

== History ==
Alpha Iota Omicron was founded on October 16, 1998, at the University of Michigan as a South Asian (Indian, Pakistani and Bangladeshi) interest fraternity by eighteen students. It was the first South Asian fraternity in the United States and was part of a movement in the late 1990s of creating Greek letter organizations as cultural epicenters for South Asians. Its founding fathers were:

- Mehul Bipin Amin
- Srujan Kumar Bodepudi
- Samir Dhanani
- Ram Dharmarjan
- Parijat Vimal Gandhi
- Sagar Janveja
- Nihar Harihar Kulkarni
- Ravikanth Maddipati
- Salil Mehta
- Amit Patel
- Amit Pradipkumar Patel
- Suketu Jayanti Patel
- Vikas Raman Patel
- Mohit Rastogi
- Sandeev Sarna
- Ronjit Sing Sandhu
- Sanjay Sharma
- Vishal Sharma

The fraternity was built on the core principles or pillars of Brotherhood, Networking, Community Service, and Cultural Competence. Over the years, Alpha Iota Omicron has expanded nationally, chartering ten chapters across the United States and Canada.

One of the fraternity's activities is participating in step shows. Members of the Alpha chapter performed their first step show at the Indian American Student Association Cultural Show in October 2000. A member of Phi Beta Sigma fraternity helped to train the dancers. However, Alpha Iota Omicron's step dancing varies from traditional African American fraternities by including movements from South Asian dances.

Alpha Iota Omicron was a founding member of the APIA Greek Alliance, the former name of the National APIDA Panhellenic Association.

== Symbols ==
Alpha Iota Omicron's motto is Sic Parvis Magna. Its colors are black, blue, and silver. The fraternity’s mascot is the wolf. Its nickname is AIO.

== Chapters ==
In the following list, active chapters and colonies are listed in bold and inactive chapters are in italics.

Chapter	Charter date and range	Institution	Location	Status	Ref.
Alpha	October 16, 1998 – 202x ?	University of Michigan	Ann Arbor, Michigan	Inactive	
Beta	2002–2023	University of Illinois Urbana-Champaign	Champaign, Illinois	Inactive	
Gamma	2005–202x ?	Georgia Tech	Atlanta, Georgia	Inactive	
Delta	March 3, 2007 – 202x ?	Georgia State University	Atlanta, Georgia	Inactive	
Epsilon	2006–20xx ?	Northwestern University	Evanston, Illinois	Inactive	
**Zeta**	2012	Saint Louis University	St. Louis, Missouri	Inactive	
Eta	201x ?–20xx ?	University of Toronto	Toronto, Ontario, Canada	Inactive	
**Theta**			Chicago, Illinois	Colony	(Note: This colony was established in 2018 at the University of Chicago but is now citywide, no longer affiliated with an institution.)
**Iota**			Santa Cruz, California	Colony	(Note: This colony was established in 2018 at the University of California, Santa Cruz. It is now a citywide chapter, not affiliated with a specific institution.)
Kappa		University of California, Berkeley	Berkeley, California	Inactive	(Note: Established in 2019, this was a colony that went inactive before being officially chartered.)
**Lambda**		Rutgers University–New Brunswick	New Brunswick, New Jersey	Colony	(Note: Chapter is not recognized by the university.)

== See also ==
- List of social fraternities and sororities
- List of Asian American fraternities and sororities
- Cultural interest fraternities and sororities
