= Sigma Psi Zeta =

American multicultural college sorority

- ΣΨΖ
- Founded: March 23, 1994; 32 years ago University at Albany
- Type: Social
- Affiliation: NAPA
- Status: Active
- Emphasis: Cultural interest - Asian-American
- Scope: National
- Motto: "Lead from the front."
- Colors: Red and Gold
- Flower: Yellow Rose with Baby's Breath
- Philanthropy: Combatting violence against women
- Chapters: 23 plus 12 charters
- Colonies: 8
- Nickname: SYZ, Sigmas
- Headquarters: 11241 Green Watch Way; North Potomac, Maryland 20878; United States
- Website: www.sigmapsizeta.org

Sigma Psi Zeta (ΣΨΖ) Sorority, Inc., also known as Sigmas or SYZ, is a progressive multicultural American sorority. It was founded on March 23, 1994, at the University at Albany and incorporated in New York on March 15, 1996. It is the third-largest Asian-interest sorority in the nation. It is a part of the National APIDA Panhellenic Association (NAPA).

== History ==
Plans for the Sigma Psi Zeta sorority were formed in the fall semester of 1993 at SUNY Albany by a group of female undergraduates from different backgrounds. The sorority was formed in part to address the dual difficulties faced by Asian women. Its founding mothers were Gina Han, Sally Hsieh, Jean Kim, Jenny Kim, Sandra Lam, Winnie Liu, Yan-Chieh Liu, Michelle Macaraig, Sung-Yon Noh, and Loan Trang.

On March 23, 1994, the sorority was officially recognized by the university. Within a year, a second chapter was formed at SUNY University at Binghamton. The sorority was incorporated in New York on March 15, 1996.

Internally, the sorority uses the term "womxn" instead of "woman" or "women". Similarly, it uses "sxsters" or "syzters" in place of "sisters". Similar terminology has been adopted by other multicultural organizations.

== Symbols ==
The sorority's colors are red and gold and its flower is a yellow rose with baby's breath. Its motto is "Lead from the front."

== Activities ==
Sigma Psi Zeta is a cultural, social, educational, and community service–oriented Greek organization. Its philanthropic focus is to combat violence against women in its various forms. Sigma Psi Zeta is an official partner of the White House initiative, It's On Us, which launched as a result of the ARC3 Survey.

Since 1999, Sigma Psi Zeta's philanthropy has been to combat violence against women. The sorority has worked against violence against women in many forms and has focused specifically on Asian women who are historically objectified and disempowered. Local chapters and colonies participate in events such as the Take Back The Night rallies and the National Coalition Against Domestic Violence's Domestic Violence Awareness month.

== Membership ==
Sigma Psi Zeta has 35 active units (23 chapters and 12 charters) in the states/commonwealths of California, Colorado, Connecticut, Illinois, Kansas, Maryland, Massachusetts, Michigan, Minnesota, Nebraska, New Jersey, New York, Pennsylvania, Virginia, Washington, Washington D.C., and Wisconsin.

== Chapters ==
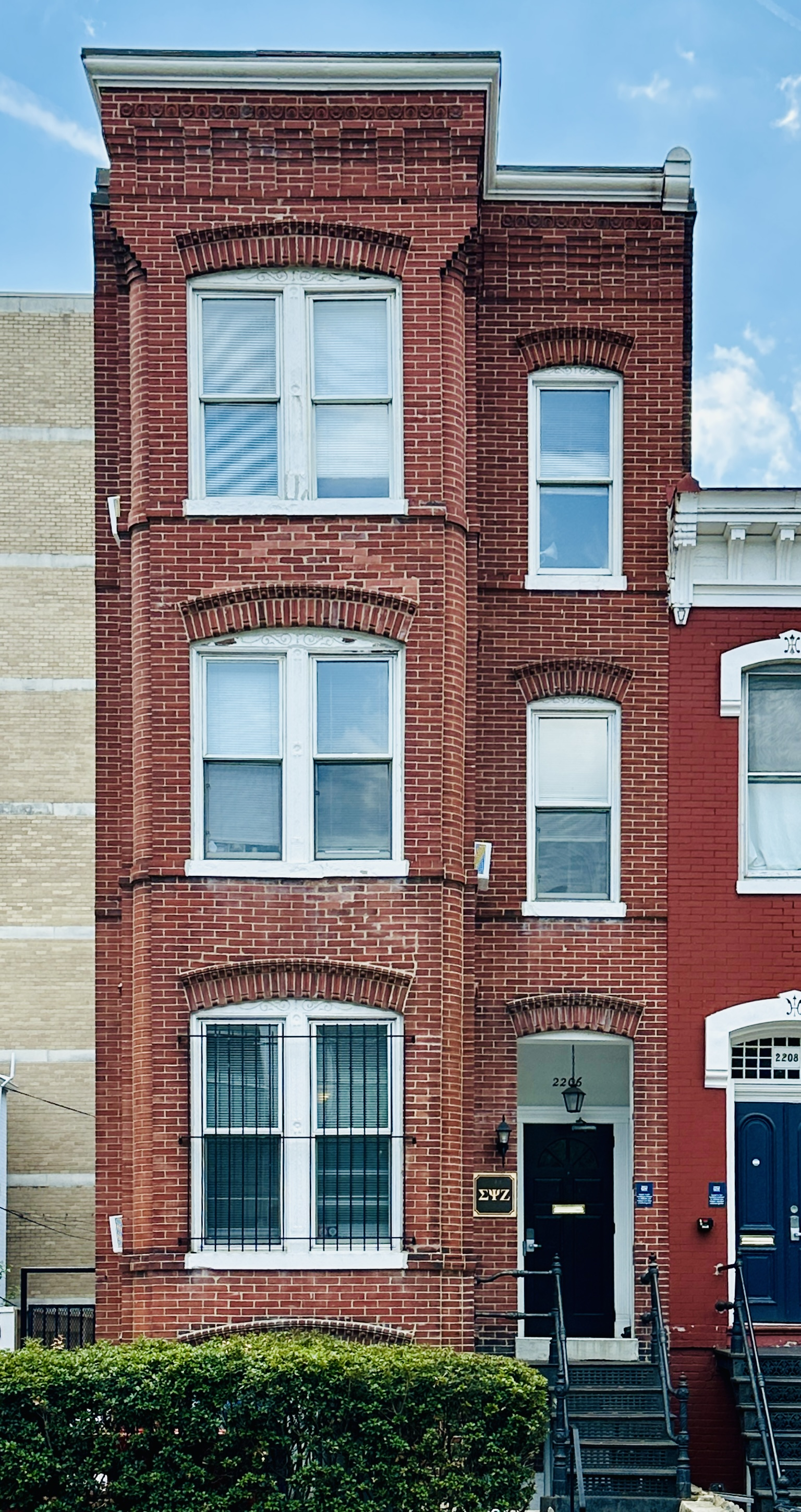
Pi chapter of Sigma Psi Zeta at George Washington University

Following are the chapters of Sigma Psi Zeta. The sorority differentiates between three levels of organization at its campus units. Chapter status appears to be the ultimate goal. Newer or emerging groups are called charters. The third type is denoted as Interest Groups; an interest group must have permission to form from campus administration and must include at least ten members.

Active groups are listed here in bold, inactive groups are listed in italics.

Chapter	Charter date and range	Institution	Location	Status	Ref.
**Alpha**	March 23, 1994	University at Albany, SUNY	Albany, NY	Active	
**Beta charter**	January 4, 1995 – xxxx ?, 20xx ?	Binghamton University	Binghamton, NY	Active	
Gamma	January 18, 1997 – 20xx ?	Saint John's University	Jamaica, NY	Inactive	
**Delta**	October 3, 1998	University at Buffalo	Buffalo, NY	Active	
Epsilon	October 10, 1998 – 20xx ?	SUNY Oneonta	Oneonta, NY	Inactive	
Zeta	November 7, 1998 – 20xx ?	Pace University	New York, NY	Inactive	
**Eta**	May 20, 2000	Stony Brook University	Stony Brook, NY	Active	
**Theta charter**	November 18, 2000 – 20xx ?; 202x ?	University of Massachusetts Amhers	Amherst, MA	Active	(Note: This chapter was reformed as a charter.)
**Iota**	December 1, 2000	University of Rochester	Rochester, NY	Active	
**Kappa charter**	January 7, 2001 – 20xx ?; 20xx?	Virginia Tech	Blacksburg, VA	Active	
**Lambda**	December 1, 2001	University of Virginia	Charlottesville, VA	Active	
Mu	June 2, 2002 – 201x ?	SUNY Geneseo	Geneseo, NY	Inactive	
**Nu**	July 17, 2002	Drexel University	Philadelphia, PA	Active	
**Xi**	January 3, 2003	University of Nebraska–Lincoln	Lincoln, NE	Active	
Omicron	June 12, 2004 – 202x ?	Stanford University	Stanford, CA	Inactive	
**Pi**	November 15, 2003	George Washington University	Washington, D.C.	Active	
**Rho**	November 22, 2003	University of Washington	Seattle, WA	Active	
**Tau**	December 6, 2003	University of Maryland, College Park	College Park, MD	Active	
**Upsilon**	April 18, 2004	University of Pennsylvania	Philadelphia, PA	Active	
**Phi**	April 24, 2004	University of Colorado Boulder	Boulder, CO	Active	
Chi	April 4, 2006 – 201x ?	Shippensburg University of Pennsylvania	Shippensburg, PA	Inactive	
Alpha Alpha	April 8, 2007 – 201x ?	Yale University	New Haven, CT	Inactive	
**Alpha Beta**	May 10, 2008	Northwestern University	Evanston, IL	Active	
**Alpha Gamma charter**	April 9, 2011	Villanova University	Villanova, PA	Active	
**Alpha Delta**	April 1, 2012	Rutgers University	New Brunswick, NJ	Active	
**Alpha Epsilon**	April 7, 2012	University of Illinois at Urbana–Champaign	Champaign, IL	Active	
**Alpha Zeta charter**	April 21, 2013	Saint Joseph's University	Philadelphia, PA	Active	
Alpha Eta	November 16, 2013 – 20xx ?	New York City	New York City	Inactive	
**Alpha Theta**	November 16, 2013	Wichita State University	Wichita, KS	Active	
**Alpha Iota**	October 25, 2014	University of California, Berkeley	Berkeley, CA	Active	
**Alpha Kappa**	November 8, 2014	University of Minnesota	Minneapolis, MN	Active	
**Alpha Lambda**	November 8, 2015	Rochester Institute of Technology	Rochester, NY	Active	
**Alpha Mu**	March 26, 2016	University of Kansas	Lawrence, KS	Active	
**Alpha Nu**	November 12, 2017	George Mason University	Fairfax, VA	Active	
**Alpha Xi charter**	March 24, 2018	Syracuse University	Syracuse, NY	Active	(Note: Chapter was founded as a colony in 2016.)
**Alpha Omicron charter**	April 8, 2018	Indiana University Indianapolis	Indianapolis, IN	Active	
**Alpha Pi charter**	March 10, 2019	University of Wisconsin–Madison	Madison, WI	Active	
**Alpha Rho**	April 20, 2019	Stevens Institute of Technology	Hoboken, NJ	Active	
**Alpha Tau charter**	April 12, 2020	New York University	New York City, NY	Active	
**Alpha Upsilon**	March 21, 2021	Northeastern University	Boston, MA	Active	
**Alpha Phi charter**	April 23, 2021	Western Michigan University	Kalamazoo, MI	Active	
**Alpha Chi charter**	November 17, 2021	Washington State University	Pullman, WA	Active	
**Alpha Psi charter**	November 18, 2021	Temple University	Philadelphia, PA	Active	

== See also ==
- List of social fraternities and sororities
- List of Asian American fraternities and sororities
- Cultural interest fraternities and sororities
