= Delta Sigma Iota =

American South Asian interest fraternity

- ΔΣΙ
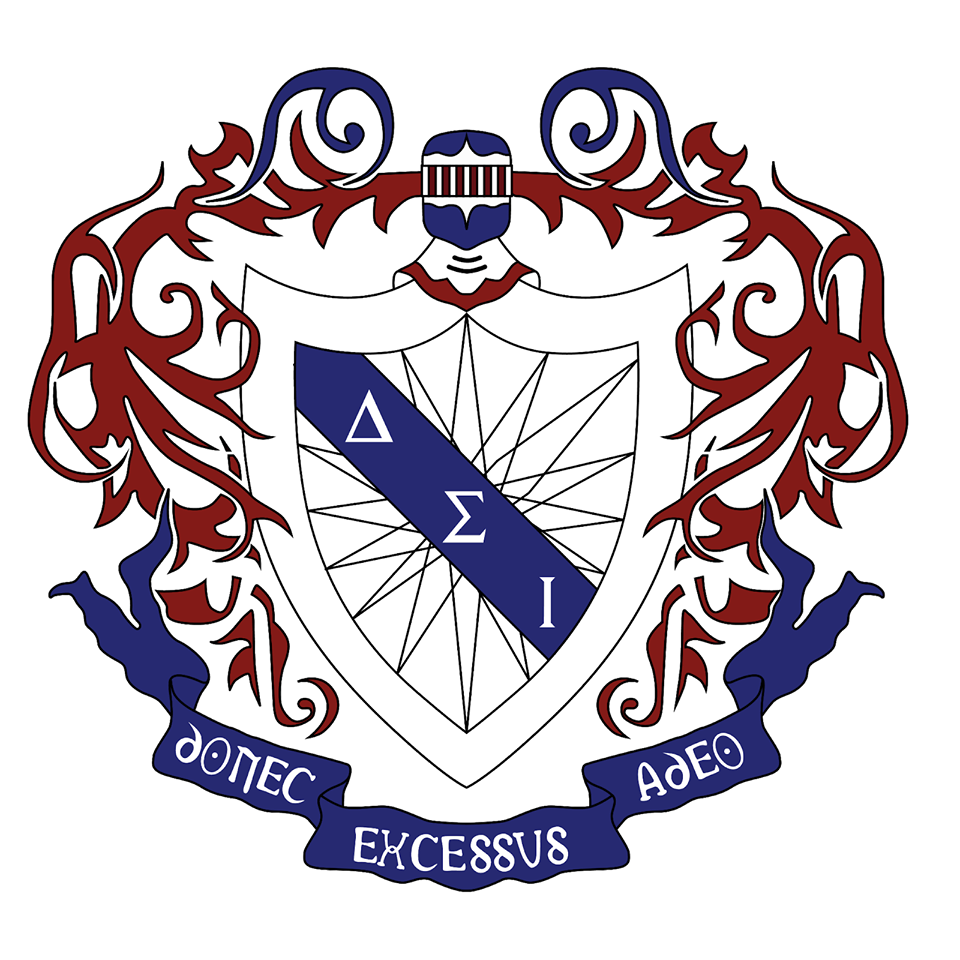
- Founded: August 15, 2000; 25 years ago Pennsylvania State University
- Type: Social
- Affiliation: NAPA
- Status: Active
- Emphasis: South Asian
- Scope: National
- Motto: Donec Excessus Adeo
- Pillars: Service, Education, Unity
- Slogan: "Building Leaders, One Brother at a Time"
- Colors: Navy Blue, White, and Maroon
- Mascot: King Cobra
- Chapters: 1
- Colonies: 2
- Nickname: DSI
- Headquarters: New Brunswick, New Jersey; United States
- Website: www.deltasigmaiota.org

Delta Sigma Iota (ΔΣΙ) is a collegiate, South Asian interest, multicultural, social fraternity located in the United States. It was established at Pennsylvania State University in 2000 and has chartered nine chapters in the United States.

== History ==
Delta Sigma Iota Fraternity, Inc., was founded on August 15, 2000, at the University Park campus of Pennsylvania State University as a South Asian interest, multicultural, social, Greek letter fraternity. Its founding fathers were:

- Tarak Bhavsa
- Vishal Desai
- Roby Palakudy
- Rupesh Patel
- Vipul Patel

It became a member of the National Asian Pacific Islander American Panhellenic Association (NAPA) on February 8, 2016. Its headquarters are in New Brunswick, New Jersey.

== Symbols ==
Delta Sigma Iota's motto is Donec Excessus Adeo. Its slogan is "Building Leaders, One Brother at a Time". Its pillars are Service, Education, and Unity.

The fraternity's colors are navy blue, white, and maroon. Its mascot is the king cobra, chosen because it embodies the spirit of Mahatma Gandhi, powerful but attacking only in defense.

== Philanthropy ==
Delta Sigma Iota's national philanthropies are the South Asian Marrow Association of Recruiters (SAMAR), a community-based network member of the National Marrow Donor Program, and Only With Consent, dedicated to stopping sexual violence.

== Chapters ==
In the following list, active chapters and colonies are listed in bold and inactive chapters are in italics.

Chapter	Charter date and range	Institution	Location	Status	Ref.
Alpha	August 15, 2000 – 2024	Pennsylvania State University	University Park, Pennsylvania	Inactive	(Note: The university suspended the chapter through May 2026 for hazing, alcohol, and/or drug violations and other university policies.)
Beta	2004 - 2019	University of North Carolina at Chapel Hill	Chapel Hill, North Carolina	Inactive	
Gamma	April 8, 2006 - 2024	North Carolina State University	Raleigh, North Carolina	Inactive	
**Delta**	April 8, 2006	Rutgers University–New Brunswick	New Brunswick, New Jersey	Active	
Zeta	2014 - 2021	Montclair State University	Montclair, New Jersey	Inactive	
Eta	2011 – 2014	Duke University	Durham, North Carolina	Inactive	
Theta	2014 – 2019	Ohio State University	Columbus, Ohio	Inactive	
Iota	2019 - 2023	University of North Carolina at Charlotte	Charlotte, North Carolina	Inactive	
**Kappa**	April 21, 2023	Bentley University	Waltham, Massachusetts	Colony	

== See also ==
- List of social fraternities and sororities
- List of Asian American fraternities and sororities
- Cultural interest fraternities and sororities
