= Delta Kappa Delta =

Asian American cultural sorority

- ΔΚΔ
- Founded: October 1, 1999; 26 years ago Texas A&M University
- Type: Service and Cultural interest
- Affiliation: NAPA
- Status: Active
- Emphasis: South Asian Interest and Multicultural based
- Scope: National (United States)
- Motto: "I slept and dreamt that life was joy, I awoke and saw that life was service, I acted, and behold, service was a joy." Rabindranath Tagore
- Colors: Violet, Black, and Silver
- Symbol: Diya
- Flower: Lotus
- Mascot: Peacock
- Philanthropy: Child abuse prevention and awareness
- Chapters: 12
- Colonies: 4
- Headquarters: College Station, Texas; United States
- Website: www.deltakappadelta.com

Delta Kappa Delta (Also known as B.E.T.I.S., ΔΚΔ, and DKD) is a United States–based college sorority. Delta Kappa Delta is a cultural interest sorority oriented towards South Asian culture. It was founded at Texas A&M University in 1999. It is a founding member of the National APIDA Panhellenic Association.

== History ==
The precursor to Delta Kappa Delta was a grassroots service organization named B.E.T.I.S. or Behind Every True Indian Sister. Its founders felt the need for a community service-oriented organization. The sorority was formed October 1, 1999, at Texas A&M University. Its thirteen founders are:

- Preya Sharma (née Batra)
- Rachel Goel (née Gupta)
- Nisha Kavalam (née Kalluvilayil)
- Sylvia Kalluvilayil
- Sheila Krishan
- Hiral Mathur (née Shah)
- Dimple Patel
- Meenal Johnson (née Patel)
- Siby Samuel (née Phillip)
- Neha Londoño (née Shah)
- Nisha Sidhwani
- Christina Thomas
- Celine Xavier

The sorority's philanthropy is child abuse prevention and awareness. In 2014, it was one of the fourteen founding members of the National Asian Pacific Islander American Panhellenic Association (NAPA).

== Symbols ==
The sorority's symbol is the Diya and its flower is the lotus. Its mascot is the peacock. Its colors are black, silver, and violet. Its motto is “I slept and dreamt that life was joy, I awoke and saw that life was service, I acted, and behold, service was joy.”

== Chapters ==
Following are the 'charters' or chapters of Delta Kappa Delta. Active chapters are indicated in bold. Inactive chapters are indicated in italic.

Charters	Chapter/Range	Institution	City	State	Status	References
**Alpha**	October 1, 1999	Texas A&M University	College Station	Texas	Active	
**Beta**	January 19, 2002	Texas Tech University	Lubbock	Texas	Active	
Gamma	January 17, 2003 – 20xx ?	University of Texas at Austin	Austin	Texas	Inactive	
**Delta**	July 30, 2004	Temple University	Philadelphia	Pennsylvania	Active	
**Epsilon**	September 30, 2006	University of Illinois at Urbana–Champaign	Urbana and Champaign	Illinois	Active	
**Zeta**	July 8, 2010 – 2017; 2021	Baylor University	Waco	Texas	Active	
**Eta**	January 22, 2011	Rutgers University–New Brunswick	New Brunswick	New Jersey	Active	
**Theta**	September 24, 2011	University of North Texas	Denton	Texas	Active	
**Iota**	December 4, 2016	University of Massachusetts Amherst	Amherst	Massachusetts	Active	
**Kappa**	November 18, 2016	University of Illinois at Chicago	Chicago	Illinois	Active	
**Lambda**	December 10, 2011	New York University	New York City	New York	Active	
**Mu**	December 12, 2015	University of Texas at Dallas	Dallas	Texas	Active	
**Nu**	May 19, 2017	University of Washington	Seattle	Washington	Active	
Binghamton SUNY Associate	January 17, 2003 – 20xx ?	Binghamton University	Vestal	New York	Inactive	
Southern Methodist University Associate	April 24, 2003 – 20xx ?	Southern Methodist University	University Park	Texas	Inactive	
**IUPUI** **Associate**	November 23, 2019	Indiana University – Purdue University Indianapolis	Indianapolis	Indiana	Active	
**University of Maryland Associate**	June 6, 2020	University of Maryland	College Park	Maryland	Active	
**North Carolina State University Associate**	June 8, 2020	North Carolina State University	Raleigh	North Carolina	Active	
**Purdue University Associate**	December 9, 2021	Purdue University	West Lafayette	Indiana	Active	
**Miami University - Ohio Associate**	January 29, 2024	Miami University	Oxford	Ohio	Active	

== See also ==
- List of social fraternities and sororities
- List of Asian American fraternities and sororities
- Cultural interest fraternities and sororities
