= Sigma Sigma Rho =

American collegiate sorority for South Asians

- ΣΣΡ
- Coat of Arms of Sigma Sigma Rho
- Founded: December 10, 1998; 27 years ago St. John's University
- Type: Social
- Affiliation: NAPA
- Status: Active
- Emphasis: South Asian
- Scope: National
- Motto: "Mann, Atman, Dharam. Together they are one. We will not fall. Forever we are one….Qayamat Tak."
- Pillars: Sisterhood, Society, Remembrance
- Colors: Royal blue, Black and Silver
- Flower: White rose
- Mascot: Black mare
- Philanthropy: Domestic violence awareness and prevention
- Chapters: 12 active
- Colonies: 4
- Headquarters: 162 South Bush Drive; Valley Stream, New York 11581; United States
- Website: www.sigmasigmarho.com

Sigma Sigma Rho (ΣΣΡ) is a South Asian interest collegiate sorority in the United States. It was established at St. John's University in 1998. It is a National APIDA Panhellenic Association member. The sorority has chartered 26 chapters in the United States.

== History ==
Sigma Sigma Rho is a South Asian interest sorority established at St. John's University in New York City, New York on December 10, 1998. Its ten founders were Nisha (Rana) Diler, Eshna (Firoz) Kalam, Vandana Kakwani-Pathak, Tejal Kundaiker, Minna (John) Lam, Lovleen (Kandhari) Sharma, Priya Sahani Sood, Rinku (Sachdeva) Thomas, Sonia (Sharma) Wadhwa, and Payal (Suchdev) Walsh.

Sigma Sigma Rho was the first South Asian interest sorority on the East Coast of the United States. It became a national sorority when its expanded to the University of South Florida and Rutgers University–New Brunswick in 2002. Since then, it has chartered 26 chapters.

Although it is a South Asian interest sorority, its membership is open to any student with similar interests and multicultural, including women of Chinese, Haitian, Hispanic, Japanese, Middle Eastern, and South Asian (Indian, Pakistani, and Bangladeshi) backgrounds. The sorority's national philanthropy is domestic violence awareness and prevention, chosen because this topic is rarely spoken about in South Asian culture.

Sigma Sigma Rho's headquarters is at 162 South Bush Drive in Valley Stream, New York. It is a member of the National APIDA Panhellenic Association.

== Symbols ==
The name Sigma Sigma Rho was selected to stand for sisterhood, society, and remembrance. The sorority's motto is "Mann, Atman, Dharam. Together they are one. We will not fall. Forever we are one….Qayamat Tak." Its principles or pillars are Sisterhood, Society, and Remembrance.

The sorority's colors are royal blue, black, and silver. Its mascot is the black mare. Its flower is the white rose.

== Chapters ==
Following is a list of Sigma Sigma Rho establishments or chapters, with active chapters indicated in bold and inactive chapters in italics.

| Chapter | Charter date and range | Institution | Location | Status | Ref. |
|---|---|---|---|---|---|
| Alpha | December 10, 1998 | St. John's University | Queens, New York City, New York | Active | |
| Beta | 2002–20xx ? | University of South Florida | Tampa, Florida | Inactive | |
| Gamma | 2002–2024 | Rutgers University–New Brunswick | New Brunswick, New Jersey | Inactive | |
| Delta | 2005 | Baruch College | New York City, New York | Active | |
| **Epsilon** | January 27, 2007 | University of Georgia | Athens, Georgia | Active | |
| Zeta | 2010 | Pace University | New York City, New York | Active | |
| **Eta** | January 12, 2012 | University of Tennessee | Knoxville, Tennessee | Active | (Note: Chapter started as a colony on June 4, 2010.) |
| **Theta** | March 20, 2013 | Georgia State University | Atlanta, Georgia | Active | (Note: Chapter formed as a colony on September 10, 2005.) |
| Iota | 2011–2015 | University of Houston | Houston, Texas | Inactive | |
| **Kappa** | 2011 | University of Alabama at Birmingham | Birmingham, Alabama | Active | |
| Lambda | May 21, 2011 – 2019 | Michigan State University | East Lansing, Michigan | Inactive | |
| Mu | April 23, 2011 – 2018 | Pennsylvania State University | University Park, Pennsylvania | Inactive | |
| **Nu** | 2012 | Georgia Tech | Atlanta, Georgia | Active | (Note: Chapter started as a colony in 2005.) |
| Xi | December 3, 2011 | Embry–Riddle Aeronautical University, Daytona Beach | Daytona Beach, Florida | Active | |
| Omicron | August 5, 2016 | Lamar University | Beaumont, Texas | Active | (Note: Chapter was formed as a colony on April 13, 2013.) |
| **Pi** | 2014 | University of Texas at Dallas | Richardson, Texas | Active | |
| **Rho** | April 12, 2015 | Indiana University Bloomington | Bloomington, Indiana | Active | |
| **Sigma** | | Alumni chapter | | Active | |
| Tau | December 10, 2017 | University of Michigan | Ann Arbor, Michigan | Active | |
| Upsilon | 2018–2022 | The College of New Jersey | Ewing Township, New Jersey | Inactive | (Note: Chapter formed as a colony on April 3, 2016.) |
| **Phi** | March 22, 2015 | University of Florida | Gainesville, Florida | Active | (Note: Chapter formed as a colony in 2014.) |
| **Chi** | April 17, 2017 | Mercer University | Macon, Georgia | Active | |
| Psi | 2018 | Wayne State University | Detroit, Michigan | Active | |
| **Omega** | | | | Memorial | |
| **Alpha Alpha** | 20xx ? | New York Institute of Technology | Old Westbury, New York | Active | |
| | February 4, 2017 | East Tennessee State University | Johnson City, Tennessee | Colony | |
| | | East Carolina University | Greenville, North Carolina | Colony | |
| | May 2016 | University of North Carolina at Greensboro | Greensboro, North Carolina | Colony | |
| | Fall 2018 | Kennesaw State University | Kennesaw, Georgia | Colony | |
| | April 13, 2025 | Middle Georgia State University | Macon, Georgia | Colony | |
| | April 26, 2025 | University at Buffalo | Buffalo, New York | Colony | |

== See also ==
- Cultural interest fraternities and sororities
- List of Asian American fraternities and sororities
- List of social sororities and women's fraternities
