= Pi Delta Psi =

American cultural Fraternity

- ΠΔΨ
- Founded: February 20, 1994; 32 years ago Binghamton University
- Type: Social
- Affiliation: NAPA
- Status: Active
- Emphasis: Cultural interest - Asian American
- Scope: National (United States)
- Motto: "Excellence Through Brotherhood"
- Pillars: Academic Achievement, Cultural Awareness, Righteousness, and Friendship/Loyalty
- Colors: Red, White, and Black
- Symbol: Dragon
- Publication: The Dragon
- Philanthropy: Asia Foundation
- Chapters: 17 active
- Colonies: 1
- Members: 4,000 lifetime
- Headquarters: 176-25 Union Turnpike; Fresh Meadows, Queens, New York 11366-1515; United States
- Website: www.pideltapsi.com

Pi Delta Psi (ΠΔΨ) is an Asian American-interest cultural fraternity founded at Binghamton University on February 20, 1994. As of 2024, the organization listed over 4,000-lifetime members spanning 31 undergraduate chapters and 1 alumni chapter. This organization is a member of the National APIDA Panhellenic Association (NAPA).

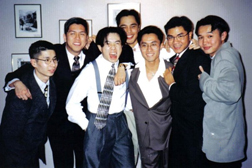
Pi Delta Psi's founding fathers, 1996

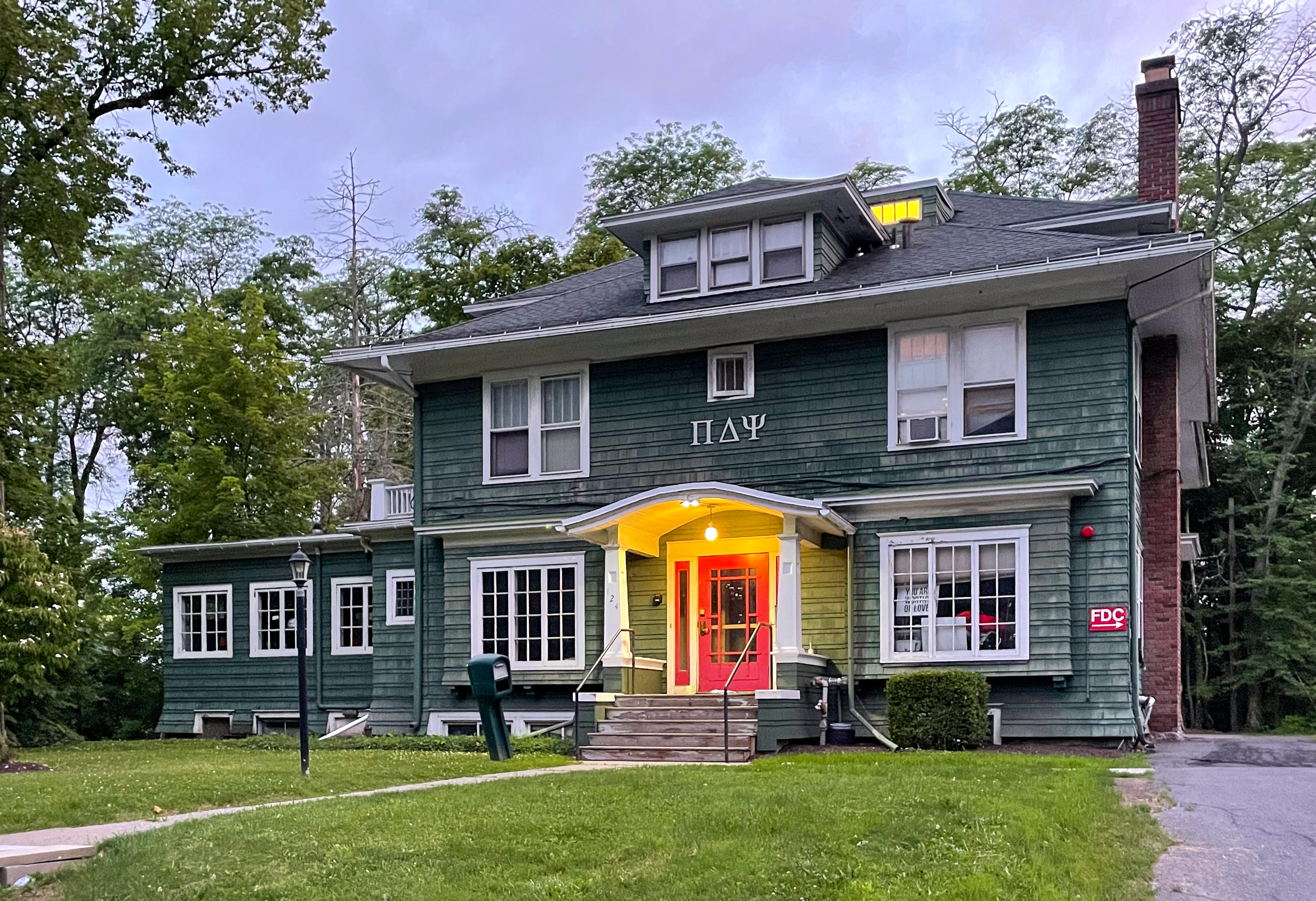
Kappa chapter house, Cornell University

== History ==
Pi Delta Psi fraternity was founded at Binghamton University (SUNY) on February 20, 1994. The fraternity's founding members were Ronny Chow, Chester Huang, Philip Hunt, Damien Lee, David Lee, Thuan Luong, Christopher Murata, Spencer Seto, Michael Son, Tracy B. Tabije, and Sammy Wong.

Pi Delta Psi and its members seek to bring about Asian-American unity by breaking down cultural barriers amongst Asian communities by upholding and/or instilling the fraternity's pillars: academic achievement, cultural awareness, righteousness, friendship, and loyalty. Pi Delta Psi's mission statement also advocates an increase in education and awareness of Asian cultures as a means of overcoming racism.

A year after its founding, Pi Delta Psi was officially incorporated in the State of New York on April 19, 1995. After five years, the fraternity had grown too large for the informal Pi Delta Psi National Council to maintain. Thus in 1999, it was decided by the National Council to restructure itself in an effort to grow in proportion to the fraternity's expansion rate, standardize chapters nationwide, and increase inter-chapter cohesion. The National Council was also renamed the "National Executive Board" during that period.

After 25 years, Pi Delta Psi expanded to 31 campuses spanning fourteen states, including California, Colorado, Connecticut, Florida, Georgia, Maryland, Massachusetts, Minnesota, New Jersey, New York, Ohio, Pennsylvania, Virginia, and Washington, D.C.

As of 2025, Pi Delta Psi maintains chapters at more than 20 universities across the United States, with its national headquarters located in New York City.

== Symbols ==
Pi Delta Psi's motto is "Excellence Through Brotherhood". The fraternity's pillars are Academic Achievement, Cultural Awareness, Righteousness, and Friendship/Loyalty. Its colors are red, white, and black. Its symbol is the dragon. Its publication is The Dragon.

== Activities ==
=== National Convention ===
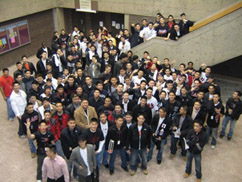
Convention at Rutgers University, 2005.

Pi Delta Psi holds an annual National Convention in August of each year. The National Convention is a formal 2-day meeting of members where the National Executive Board meets and discusses relevant fraternity issues with active members from all chapters. Discussed issues involve an overview of the fraternity, creating general goals, and national expansion. Cultural, professional, and/or leadership workshops are also held. The location of each year's National Convention is usually determined at the previous convention and changes annually.

=== National Winter Conference ===
Pi Delta Psi holds an annual National Winter Conference in January. The Winter Conference is a day-long leadership retreat where the National Executive Board meets and discusses relevant fraternity issues with representatives from each undergraduate chapter. The event is typically held in the New York metropolitan area.

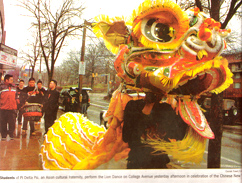
Tau chapter performing their annual lion dance on campus.

=== National Summer Weekend ===
Pi Delta Psi holds an annual National Summer Weekend during July each year. The National Summer Weekend is a 2-3 day series of events that includes the National Summer BBQ, National Summer Conference, and National Summer Banquet.

The National Summer BBQ is normally held at Alley Pond Park in Queens, New York, and includes sporting events and chapter fundraising activities. The National Summer Conference is a private half-day event where the National Executive Board meets and discusses relevant fraternity issues with active chapter members. Elections for the following year's National Executive Board also take place during this event. The Conference is normally held in the New York metropolitan area. The National Summer Banquet is a formal dinner event for Pi Delta Psi members, which is normally held near the location of the National Summer Conference. National announcements such as awards and scholarships are presented during this event.

=== Cultural awareness ===
At the chapter level, each chapter is required to host a set number of cultural events on campus each year, depending on the chapter's size; failure to achieve this annual criterion will result in the chapter losing its chapter status. There are various annual events that these chapters host specifically such as "Amazing Race: Asian Edition" which is regularly hosted alongside Kappa Phi Lambda.

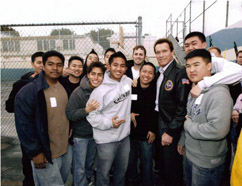
Brothers with California's Governor Arnold Schwarzenegger during a philanthropy event.

== Philanthropy ==
The fraternity's primary philanthropy is The Asia Foundation. The March of Dimes was named as the national philanthropy of Pi Delta Psi for 2009; the fraternity remains an official team youth partner. Formerly, Pi Delta Psi's national philanthropy was the Big Brothers Big Sisters of America program. All chapters were expected to work closely with the Big Brothers program in their own campus community.

At the chapter level, each chapter was required to participate in a set number of philanthropy events each year, depending on the chapter's size; failure to achieve this annual criterion results in the chapter having its status revoked. Much of the fundraising done by the chapters at the local level is done via fraternity-specific banquets or collaborative social events like "The Official Four Way: World Tour" with other fraternal Greek-lettered organizations like Alpha Phi Alpha, Lambda Upsilon Lambda, and Iota Nu Delta.

== Chapters ==
=== Collegiate chapters ===
Following are the collegiate chapters of Pi Delta Psi, with active chapters indicated in bold and inactive chapters in italics.

Chapter	Charter date and range	Institution	City	State	Status	Ref.
**Alpha**	February 20, 1994	Binghamton University	Vestal	New York	Active	
**Beta**	December 3, 1994	SUNY Buffalo	Buffalo	New York	Active	
Gamma	December 7, 1996 – 20xx ?	Hofstra University	Hempstead (village)	New York	Inactive	
**Delta**	May 17, 1997	Stony Brook University	Stony Brook	New York	Active	
Epsilon					Unassigned	
**Zeta**	May 17, 1997	New York University	New York	New York	Active	
**Eta**	December 13, 1997	SUNY Albany	Albany	New York	Active	
**Theta**	December 13, 1997	Rensselaer Polytechnic Institute	Troy	New York	Active	
Iota	November 24, 1997 – 2015	University of Rochester	Rochester	New York	Inactive	
**Kappa**	April 25, 1998	Cornell University	Ithaca	New York	Active	
Lambda	November 21, 1998 – 20xx ?	Rutgers University	New Brunswick	New Jersey	Active	
**Mu**	April 22, 2000	Ohio State University	Columbus	Ohio	Active	
Nu	December 8, 2001 – 20xx ?	Carnegie Mellon University	Pittsburgh	Pennsylvania	Inactive	
Xi	November 24, 1999 – 2020	University of Massachusetts Amherst	Amherst	Massachusetts	Inactive	
**Omicron**	November 15, 2003	The George Washington University	Washington	District of Columbia	Active	
Pi	November 13, 2004 – 20xx ?	University of Maryland at College Park	College Park	Maryland	Inactive	
Rho	March 30, 2002 – 2019	University of California, Riverside	Riverside	California	Inactive	
**Sigma**	November 13, 2004	University of Florida	Gainesville	Florida	Active	
**Tau**	April 19, 2003	Pennsylvania State University	University Park	Pennsylvania	Inactive	
Upsilon	November 18, 2006 – 20xx ?	Rochester Institute of Technology	Henrietta	New York	Inactive	
**Phi**	April 7, 2008	University of Central Florida	Orlando	Florida	Active	
**Chi**	November 9, 2008	University of South Florida	Tampa	Florida	Active	
Psi	November 8, 2008 – 201x ?	St. John's University	Queens	New York	Inactive	
**Omega**	April 12, 2008	University of Connecticut	Storrs	Connecticut	Active	
**Alpha Alpha**	November 19, 2005	Northeastern University	Boston	Massachusetts	Active	
Alpha Beta	April 23, 2005 – 20xx ?	Columbia University	New York	New York	Inactive	
**Alpha Gamma**	November 17, 2012	George Mason University	Fairfax	Virginia	Active	
**Alpha Delta**	April 16, 2011	University of Minnesota	Minneapolis	Minnesota	Active	
**University of North Florida Associate**		University of North Florida	Jacksonville	Florida	Active	(Note: This associate chapter was formed on April 13, 2024.)

=== Alumni chapters ===
Chapter	Charter date and range	City	State	Status	Ref.
**New York City Delta Alpha Alumni**	June 13, 2006	New York	New York	Active	

== Member misconduct ==
=== Death of Michael Deng ===
On December 8, 2013, Chun Hsien "Michael" Deng was fatally injuring in an incident that took place in Tunkhannock Township, Monroe County, Pennsylvania in a house rented by Pi Delta Psi's Baruch College colony. Deng's death resulted from a hazing ritual known as the Glass Ceiling, where the pledges were blindfolded, weighed down with backpacks full of sand, and repeatedly tackled. Deng was knocked over during the ritual and lost consciousness, but was not immediately taken to the hospital by fraternity members. Instead, the fraternity brothers called Andy Meng, the national executive president of Pi Delta Psi at the time, who allegedly told them to conceal any evidence damaging to the fraternity before calling the authorities. Deng was brain dead when he arrived and the hospital some two hours after his injury and died the next day from brain trauma.

The National Pi Delta Psi fraternity withdrew its affiliation with the Baruch College colony and revoked the membership of the individuals involved. Baruch College banned the fraternity from ever returning to its campus. Deng's parents filed a civil lawsuit against the Pi Delta Psi national fraternity, the Baruch College colony of Pi Delta Psi, and various fraternity members including Meng.

On September 14, 2015, the Monroe County district attorney filed charges against 37 fraternity members for hazing, conspiracy, and hindering apprehension. On October 29, 2015, fraternity members Kenny Kwan, Charles Lai, Raymond Lam, Daniel Li, and Sheldon Wong and the Pi Delta Psi national fraternity were charged with third-degree murder, aggravated assault, simple assault, hindering apprehension, hazing and conspiracy. In January 2018, Kwan, Lai, Lam, and Wong pleaded guilty to voluntary manslaughter, hindering apprehension, and other charges. Kwan was sentenced to 12 to 24 months in prison. Lai was sentenced to 342 days to 24 months, but was released for time served. Lam and Wong were sentenced to 10 to 24 months in prison. Other fraternity members received probation, community service, and a fine.

After a seven-day trial, a jury convicted Pi Delta Psi of aggravated assault, involuntary manslaughter, hazing, hindering apprehension, and conspiracy. Judge Margherita Patti-Worthington imposed a $112,500 fine and banned the fraternity from operating in Pennsylvania for ten years, with an additional ten years’ probation. The Superior Court of Pennsylvania upheld the fine and probation, but ruled that the lower court did not have the authority to bar the fraternity from operating throughout Pennsylvania.

== See also ==
- List of social fraternities and sororities
- List of Asian American fraternities and sororities
- Cultural interest fraternities and sororities
