= Kappa Pi Beta =

American Asian-interest collegiate fraternity

- ΚΠΒ
- Founded: March 16, 2000; 26 years ago Northern Illinois University
- Type: Social
- Affiliation: NAPA
- Status: Active
- Emphasis: Asian-interest
- Scope: Regional
- Motto: "Unity is the Beginning of Brotherhood"
- Pillars: Philanthropy, Leadership, Academic Excellence, Cultural Awareness, Professionalism, Brotherhood
- Colors: Red, Black, and Charcoal Grey
- Mascot: Phoenix
- Philanthropy: Type 2 diabetes
- Chapters: 4
- Colonies: 2
- Nickname: KPiB
- Headquarters: United States
- Website: kappapibeta.org

Kappa Pi Beta National Fraternity, Inc. (ΚΠΒ) is an Asian interest collegiate fraternity with chapters in the Midwestern United States. It was established at Northern Illinois University in 2000. The fraternity is a member of the National APIDA Panhellenic Association.

== History ==
Kappa Pi Beta was established at Northern Illinois University in DeKalb, Illinois on March 16, 2000. It is an Asian interest fraternity but does not require its members to be of Asian origin. Its founders were Christopher Flores, Alfred Gozun, Phillip Gozun, Sean Orquiola, Renmar Salceda, and Soulysak Trichanh.

Its second chapter was established at the University of Illinois Chicago in 2008. By 2013, it had initiated 130 members. Kappa Pi Beta established its first colony outside of Illinois at the University of Missiouri in Columbia, Missouri in 2013, and charter a chapter at Purdue University in West Lafayette, Indiana in 2019.

As of 2024, all of Kappa Pi Beta's chapters and colonies are in the Midwestern United States. Its national philanthropy is Type 2 diabetes and the American Diabetes Association. The fraternity is a member of the National APIDA Panhellenic Association.

== Symbols ==
Kappa Pi Beta's motto is "Unity is the Beginning of Brotherhood". The fraternity's pillars are Philanthropy, Leadership, Academic Excellence, Cultural Awareness, Professionalism, Brotherhood.

Its colors are red, black, and charcoal grey. The fraternity's mascot is the phoenix. Its nickname is KPiB.

== Chapters ==
Following is a list of Kappa Pi Beta chapters.

| Chapter | Charter date and range | Institution | Location | Status | Ref. |
|---|---|---|---|---|---|
| Alpha | March 16, 2000 | Northern Illinois University | DeKalb, Illinois | Active | |
| Beta | December 14, 2008 | University of Illinois Chicago | Chicago, Illinois | Suspended | |
| Gamma | March 18, 2018 | University of Illinois Urbana-Champaign | Urbana, Illinois | Active | |
| Delta | November 16, 2019 | Purdue University | West Lafayette, Indiana | Active | |
| | | University of Missouri | Columbia, Missouri | Colony | (Note: Colony formed in 2013.) |
| | | Northwestern University | Evanston, Illinois | Colony | (Note: Colony was established in the spring of 2024.) |
