= Delta Phi Lambda =

American Asian-interest collegiate sorority

- ΔΦΛ
- Founded: December 5, 1998; 27 years ago University of Georgia
- Type: Social
- Affiliation: NAPA
- Status: Active
- Emphasis: Asian American; Multicultural
- Scope: National
- Motto: "Let Our Light Shine Forth"
- Slogan: Everlasting Sisterhood
- Colors: Navy Blue and Silver
- Flower: Blue Rose
- Jewel: Jade
- Mascot: Butterfly
- Publication: Everlasting Magazine; The Jade Times (former)
- Philanthropy: Bone Health and Osteoporosis Foundation
- Chapters: 26 collegiate, 5 alumnae
- Members: 2,000+ lifetime
- Nickname: DPhiL, DFL, Dedicated Female Leaders
- Virtues: Loyalty, Honesty, Respect, Dedication, Integrity, Discipline, Academic Excellence
- Headquarters: 650 Ponce De Leon Avenue Suite 300 #1503; Atlanta, Georgia 30308; United States
- Website: www.deltaphilambda.org

Delta Phi Lambda Sorority, Inc. (ΔΦΛ, also known as DPhiL or DFL) is an Asian-interest collegiate sorority in the United States. It was founded at the University of Georgia in 1998. The organization is a co-founder and member of the National Asian Pacific Islander Desi American Panhellenic Association (NAPA). Its campus chapters are members of their local Multicultural Greek Councils (MGCs).

== History ==
Delta Phi Lambda was founded by seven students at the University of Georgia in Athens, Georgia on December 5, 1998. Its founders were Sarah Chong Mi Cho, Linh Khanh Do, Carmela de Guzman, Anh Ngoc Nguyen, Rebecca Kim Stephenson, Theresa Sung, and Yvonne Minh Ta.

The organization was founded to advocate for awareness of Asian students, promote camaraderie among Asian and Asian-descended students, and educate the wider university about Asian culture. It was also founded to empower women.

Delta Phi Lambda chapters have made history in efforts to increase diversity and the multicultural sorority experience in addition to being a founding member of NAPA. In 2010, the Delta Phi Lambda charter at the University of West Florida became the first MGC-affiliated organization on campus. In 2020, The University of Tennessee’s Delta Phi Lambda chapter became the university’s first Asian-interest sorority and the first national Asian interest group on any campus in the state of Tennessee.

The organization is a co-founder and member of the National Asian Pacific Islander Desi American Panhellenic Association (NAPA). Its campus chapters are members of their local Multicultural Greek Councils (MGCs).

== Symbols ==
The sorority's motto is "Let Our Light Shine Forth". Its slogan is "Everlasting Sisterhood". Its virtues are Loyalty, Honesty, Respect, Dedication, Integrity, Discipline, and Academic Excellence.

Delta Phi Lambda's colors are navy blue and silver. The sorority's flower is the blue rose. Its jewel is the jade stone. Sisters of Delta Phi Lambda are referred to as DFLs or Dedicated Female Leaders.

In November 2009, The Jade Times newsletter was established as the national publication for Delta Phi Lambda. Due to the loss of leadership, The Jade Times ended in 2018. Seeing this as an opportunity to restructure the publication, it was voted to change the newsletter to a magazine format. The official Delta Phi Lambda magazine was named Everlasting Magazine in May 2021. The first issue was released on April 4, 2022.

== Membership ==
Membership in Delta Phi Lambda is gained via invitation extended to women attending a college or university with an active chapter.

== Philanthropy ==
Delta Phi Lambda's charity arm, the Delta Phi Lambda Foundation, was founded in 2010. The foundation is a non-profit organization affiliated with the sorority. It provides scholarships and funding for Delta Phi Lambda members.

One of Delta Phi Lambda's focus areas is osteoporosis awareness and prevention. The organization, along with the Delta Phi Lambda Foundation, is a supporter of American Bone Health. This partnership was officially established in February 2018, with the shared goal of raising awareness for osteoporosis and its impact on individuals' bone health.

Delta Phi Lambda chapters are required by national regulations to hold philanthropic events that increase awareness of social injustice, bring attention to issues facing the Asian community, or support local organizations doing similar work. This can take many forms, including but not limited to raising money to donate to American Bone Health, sponsoring lectures by AAPI professionals, and volunteering at sporting events with charitable contributions.

== Chapters ==
=== Collegiate chapters ===
Following are the collegiate chapters of Delta Phi Lambda, with active chapter indicated in bold and inactive chapters in italics.

Chapter	Charter Date and range	Institution	Location	Status	Ref.
**Alpha**	December 5, 1998	University of Georgia	Athens, Georgia	Active	
**Beta**	August 17, 2002	University of Cincinnati	Cincinnati, Ohio	Active	
**Gamma**	February 4, 2001	Georgia State University	Atlanta, Georgia	Active	
**Epsilon**	May 13, 2005	University of Central Florida	Orlando, Florida	Active	(Note: Chapter originated as the Nexus Club (local), formed in 2002.)
**Zeta**	March 25, 2007	Georgia Institute of Technology	Atlanta, Georgia	Active	
**Eta**	March 31, 2001	DePaul University	Chicago, Illinois	Active	
**Theta**	March 14, 2002	Emory University	Atlanta, Georgia	Active	
**Iota**	April 11, 2009	Grand Valley State University	Allendale, Michigan	Active	
**Kappa**	April 5, 2003	Loyola University Chicago	Chicago, Illinois	Active	
**Lambda**	April 15, 2001	Purdue University	West Lafayette, Indiana	Active	
Mu	March 31, 2012 - 202x ?	University at Albany	Albany, New York	Inactive	
**Nu**	March 1, 2015	Iowa State University	Ames, Iowa	Active	
Xi	November 18, 2012 - 202x ?	University of Iowa	Iowa City, Iowa	Inactive	
**Omicron**	March 27, 2010	University of West Florida	Pensacola, Florida	Active	
**Pi**	April 15, 2012	University of North Carolina at Charlotte	Charlotte, North Carolina	Active	
**Rho**	April 10, 2016	University of Connecticut	Storrs, Connecticut	Active	
**Sigma**	April 10, 2016	Clemson University	Clemson, South Carolina	Active	
**Tau**	April 22, 2018	University of Wisconsin-Madison	Madison, Wisconsin	Active	
**Phi**	March 31, 2019	Ohio State University	Columbus, Ohio	Active	
**Upsilon**	October 26, 2019	University of Nebraska–Lincoln	Lincoln, Nebraska	Active	
**Chi**	March 21, 2020	University of Tennessee-Knoxville	Knoxville, Tennessee	Active	
**Associate**	November 13, 2021	University of Kentucky	Lexington, Kentucky	Active	
**Associate**	November 13, 2022	University of Tennessee-Chattanooga	Chattanooga, Tennessee	Active	
**Associate**	November 17, 2023	University of Minnesota - Twin Cities	Minneapolis, Minnesota	Active	
**Associate**	April 4, 2025	Denison University	Granville, Ohio	Active	

=== Alumnae chapters ===
Following are the alumni chapters of Delta Phi Lambda. Active chapters are indicated in bold. Inactive chapters are indicated in italics.

Institution	Date established	Location	Status	Ref.
University of Georgia	July 1, 2015	Athens, Georgia	Inactive	
University of Central Florida	July 1, 2015	Orlando, Florida	Active	
University of Cincinnati	August 4, 2018	Cincinnati, Ohio	Inactive	
University of North Carolina at Charlotte	June 1, 2019	Charlotte, North Carolina	Active	
Northeast	May 22, 2021	Albany, New York	Active	
Tennessee	May 31, 2025	Tennessee	Active	
North Florida	May 12, 2026	Florida	Active	

== See also ==
- List of Asian American fraternities and sororities
- Cultural interest fraternities and sororities
- List of social sororities and women's fraternities
