= National APIDA Panhellenic Association =

Greek letter umbrella organization

- NAPA
- Founded: 2005; 21 years ago United States
- Type: Umbrella
- Affiliation: Independent
- Status: Active
- Emphasis: Asian, Pacific Islander, and Desi-American fraternities and sororities
- Scope: National
- Slogan: "The gold standard for APIDA fraternities and sororities"
- Members: 20 organizations active
- Headquarters: United States
- Website: www.napahq.org

The National APIDA Panhellenic Association (NAPA) is an umbrella council for twenty Asian, Pacific Islander, and Desi American fraternities and sororities (Greek Letter organizations) in universities in the United States.

== History ==
In the summer of 2004, nine fraternal organizations that served Asian and Pacific Islander students at US schools came together to form what was then called the APIA Greek Alliance (AGA), a partnership with APIA Vote aimed at registering voters in advance of the 2004 United States elections. These nine organizations were alpha Kappa Delta Phi, Alpha Iota Omicron, Delta Phi Lambda, Lambda Phi Epsilon, Kappa Phi Lambda, Nu Alpha Phi, Pi Alpha Phi, Pi Delta Psi, and Sigma Psi Zeta.

The success of this partnership led to additional collaboration. The AGA hosted the first-ever leadership summit in the summer of 2005 with support from OCA - Asian Pacific American Advocates. By the end of this summit, the fraternities and sororities present formed the North American Greek Council (NAGC) which comprised seven organizations: alpha Kappa Delta Phi, Alpha Phi Gamma, Delta Phi Lambda, Pi Alpha Phi, Pi Delta Psi, Sigma Beta Rho, and Sigma Psi Zeta.

In 2006, the NAGC formalized its constitution and renamed itself to the National APIA Panhellenic Association or the National Asian Pacific Islander American Panhellenic Association (NAPA) and recognized the following nine organizations as charter members:

- alpha Kappa Delta Phi
- Alpha Phi Gamma
- Delta Phi Lambda
- Delta Kappa Delta
- Kappa Phi Lambda
- Pi Alpha Phi
- Pi Delta Psi
- Sigma Beta Rho
- Sigma Psi Zeta

In 2017, the member organizations unanimously voted to add Desi to its formal name, a word describing people from the Indian subcontinent or South Asia, and in doing so adopted the acronym APIDA, to explicitly reflect their service of groups with South Asian membership. NAPA remains the preferred abbreviation. The organizations at the time were:

- alpha Kappa Delta Phi
- Alpha Phi Gamma
- Beta Chi Theta
- Chi Sigma Tau
- Delta Epsilon Psi
- Delta Phi Lambda
- Delta Kappa Delta
- Delta Phi Omega
- Delta Sigma Iota
- Iota Nu Delta
- Kappa Phi Gamma
- Kappa Phi Lambda
- Lambda Phi Epsilon
- Pi Alpha Phi
- Pi Delta Psi
- Sigma Beta Rho
- Sigma Psi Zeta
- Sigma Sigma Rho.

Pi Alpha Phi's membership was withdrawn in October 2023 when the fraternity closed its collegiate chapters.

NAPA has worked with peer organizations like NALFO, NMGC, NIC, NPC and NPHC on legislative issues. For example, in 2018 they successfully opposed legislation that would ban Greek life across all colleges and universities in Tennessee.

== Membership requirements ==
APIDA requires that its members (organizations) meet Fraternal Information and Programming Group (FIPG) guidelines in Risk management, hazing, and liability insurance. The decision to do so was made in 2006 with then-current groups allowed two years to meet these requirements.

== Member organizations ==
The alphabetical list of NAPA member fraternities and sororities.

Organization	Symbols	Type	Date founded	Founding location	Chapters	Ref.
alpha Kappa Delta Phi	αΚΔΦ	Sorority	February 7, 1990	University of California, Berkeley	63	
Alpha Phi Gamma	ΑΦΓ	Sorority	February 1, 1994	California State Polytechnic University, Pomona	16	
Alpha Sigma Rho	ΑΣΡ	Sorority	April 2, 1998	University of Georgia	10	
Chi Sigma Tau	ΧΣΤ	Fraternity	September 9, 1999	University of Illinois at Chicago	9	
Delta Epsilon Psi	ΔΕΨ	Fraternity	October 1, 1998	University of Texas at Austin	35	
Delta Kappa Delta	ΔΚΔ	Sorority	October 1, 1999	Texas A&M University	15	
Delta Phi Lambda	ΔΦΛ	Sorority	December 5, 1998	University of Georgia	24	
Delta Phi Omega	ΔΦΩ	Sorority	December 6, 1998	University of Houston	49	
Delta Sigma Iota	ΔΣΙ	Fraternity	August 15, 2000	Pennsylvania State University	8	
Iota Nu Delta	ΙΝΔ	Fraternity	February 7, 1994	Binghamton University	30	
Kappa Phi Gamma	ΚΦΓ	Sorority	November 8, 1998	University of Texas at Austin	19	
Kappa Phi Lambda	ΚΦΛ	Sorority	March 9, 1995	Binghamton University	37	
Kappa Pi Beta	ΚΠΒ	Fraternity	March 16, 2000	Northern Illinois University	5	
Lambda Phi Epsilon	ΛΦΕ	Fraternity	February 25, 1981	University of California, Los Angeles	70	
Pi Delta Psi	ΠΔΨ	Fraternity	February 20, 1994	Binghamton University	31	
Sigma Beta Rho	ΣΒΡ	Fraternity	August 16, 1996	University of Pennsylvania	57	
Sigma Psi Zeta	ΣΨΖ	Sorority	March 23, 1994	University at Albany	39	
Sigma Sigma Rho	ΣΣΡ	Sorority	December 10, 1998	St. John's University	26	

== Former members of National APIDA or its predecessors ==
Organization	Symbols	Type	Date founded	Founding location	Chapters	Ref.
Alpha Iota Omicron	ΑΙΩ	Fraternity	October 16, 1998	University of Michigan	6	
Beta Chi Theta	ΒΧΘ	Fraternity	June 2, 1999	University of California, Los Angeles	29	
Nu Alpha Phi	ΝΑΦ	Fraternity	March 18, 1994	State University of New York at Albany	9	
Pi Alpha Phi	ΠΑΦ	Fraternity	February 1, 1929	University of California, Berkeley	28	

== See also ==
- List of social sororities and women's fraternities
- Cultural interest fraternities and sororities
- Racism in Greek life
