= Kappa Phi Gamma =

South Asian Interest collegiate sorority in the US

- ΚΦΓ
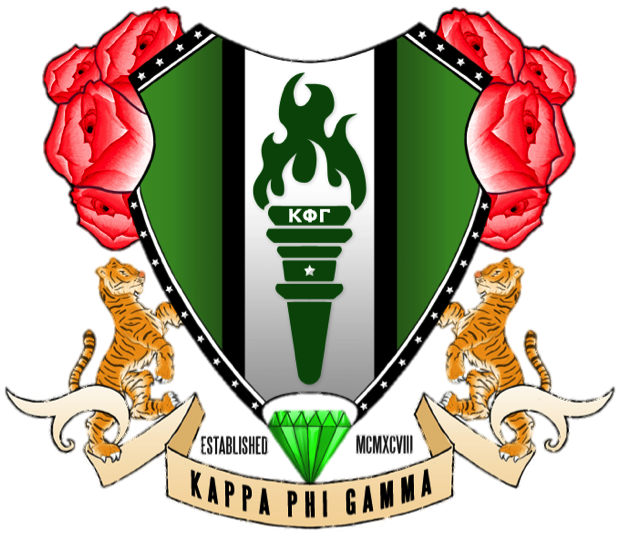
- Founded: November 8, 1998; 27 years ago University of Texas at Austin
- Type: Social
- Affiliation: NAPA
- Status: Active
- Emphasis: South Asian interest
- Scope: National
- Motto: "Reach high, for stars lie hidden in your soul. Dream deep, for every dream precedes the goal."
- Pillars: Character, Leadership, Scholarship, Sisterhood, Service, Culture, Womanhood, and Self
- Colors: Green, Black, and White
- Flower: Fire and Ice rose
- Jewel: Emerald
- Mascot: Royal Bengal tiger
- Philanthropy: Cancer Awareness
- Chapters: 10 active
- Colonies: 8
- Members: 850+ lifetime
- Nickname: KPhiG
- Headquarters: 801 Creekline Way; McKinney, Texas 75070; United States
- Website: www.kappaphigamma.com

Kappa Phi Gamma National Sorority, Inc. (ΚΦΓ), also referred to as KPhiG, is an American South Asian interest collegiate sorority. It was founded in 1998, at the University of Texas at Austin in Austin, Texas. The sorority is affiliated with the National APIDA Panhellenic Association.

== History ==
Kappa Phi Gamma was founded on November 8, 1998, at The University of Texas at Austin as the first South Asian sorority in the United States. Its founders were:

- Divya Agrawal
- (Reema) Anouska Biswas
- Leena Vasant Chaphekar
- Mitzi Chamakala Chollampel
- Samina Chowdhury
- Smitha Dawson
- Bella Desai
- Hirva Raj Doshi
- Meena Gandhi
- Jaya George-Abraham
- Mita Haldar
- Priscilla James
- Teena Makil
- Sarah Nalini Mammen
- Yogita Mathur
- Anshu Motwani
- Roseleen Noorani
- Kaysha (Gopi) Patel
- Bincy Jacob Puthenmadathil
- Rekha Reddy
- Anushu Sawhney
- Miloni Shah
- Jalpa Sheth
- Sumita Sheth
- Jamie Anita Sunny
- Sindhu Mariam Thomas
- Aisha Waliany

As of 2024, it has chartered 20 chapters and charters and has initiated more than 850 members. It is a member of the National APIDA Panhellenic Association. Its national headquarters are located at 801 Creekline Way in McKinney, Texas.

== Symbols ==
Kappa Phi Gamma's motto is a quote from Pamela Vaull Starr: "Reach high, for stars lie hidden in your soul. Dream deep, for every dream precedes the goal." Its principals or pillars are Character, Leadership, Scholarship, Sisterhood, Service, Culture, Womanhood, and Self.

The colors of Kappa Phi Gamma are green, black, and white. Its symbol is the Royal Bengal Tiger. Its flower is the Fire and Ice rose. Its jewel is the emerald. Its nickname KPhiG.

== Activities ==
The sorority helps support campus celebrations of Diwali, an Indian New Year celebration.

Kappa Phi Gamma's national philanthropy is cancer awareness and research. Each spring, Kappa Phi Gamma sorority chapters from around the nation plan C.A.R.E. Week, a cancer awareness fundraising event. C.A.R.E. stands for Cancer Awareness, a Real Effort. Kappa Phi Gamma has raised over $95,000 and has donated its services to over 40 charities, including the Bite Me Cancer Foundation, Bringing Hope Home, the Linda Creed Breast Cancer Foundation, MD Anderson Cancer Center, My Hope Chest, and Pink Door. It has a partnership with Sunshine Kids Foundation from 2023 to 2026.

Annually, Kappa Phi Gamma presents The Emerald Endowment, an annual scholarship for a non-member female student who has demonstrated excellence in leadership, scholarship, and service.

== Chapters ==
In the following list, active chapters are noted in bold and inactive chapters are noted in italics. The sorority refers to its colonies as charters.

| Chapter | Charter date and range | Institution | Location | Status | Ref. |
|---|---|---|---|---|---|
| **Alpha** | November 8, 1998 | University of Texas at Austin | Austin, Texas | Active | |
| **Beta** | September 22, 2000 | University of Texas at Dallas | Dallas, Texas | Active | |
| **Gamma** | April 23, 2001 | Baylor University | Waco, Texas | Active | |
| Delta | October 13, 2001 – 20xx ? | University of Houston | Houston, Texas | Inactive | |
| **Epsilon** | October 23, 2002 – 20xx ? | Boston University | Boston, Massachusetts | Colony | |
| **Zeta** | August 15, 2003 | University of Maryland, College Park | College Park, Maryland | Active | |
| **Eta** | November 8, 2003 – 2xxx ? | | New York City, New York | Colony | |
| **Theta** | March 6, 2005 | Virginia Commonwealth University | Richmond, Virginia | Active | |
| **Iota** | February 24, 2007 | Temple University | Philadelphia, Pennsylvania | Active | |
| Kappa | | | | Unassigned | |
| **Lambda** | January 27, 2008 | George Mason University | Fairfax County, Virginia | Active | |
| **Mu** | August 31, 2008 | Saint Joseph's University | Philadelphia, Pennsylvania | Active | (Note: This school was known as the University of the Sciences from 1998 to 2022, when the chapter was installed.) |
| **Nu** | October 10, 2009 | Drexel University | Philadelphia, Pennsylvania | Active | |
| Xi | August 6, 2010 | | Fort Lauderdale, Florida | Inactive | |
| **Omicron** | September 4, 2010 | Rutgers University–New Brunswick | New Brunswick, New Jersey | Active | |
| **Pi** | March 17, 2012 | New York Institute of Technology | Old Westbury, New York | Colony | |
| **Rho** | December 12, 2015 | Rutgers University–Newark | Newark, New Jersey | Colony | |
| **Sigma** | May 18, 2016 | New Jersey Institute of Technology | Newark, New Jersey | Colony | |
| **Tau** | December 3, 2016 | University of Massachusetts Amherst | Amherst, Massachusetts | Colony | |
| **Upsilon** | April 14, 2018 | University of Connecticut | Storrs, Connecticut | Colony | |
| **Phi** | November 16, 2019 | Adelphi University | Garden City, New York | Colony | |

== See also ==
- List of social fraternities and sororities
- List of Asian American fraternities and sororities
- Cultural interest fraternities and sororities
