= Beta Chi Theta =

American Asian interest collegiate fraternity

- ΒΧΘ
- Founded: June 2, 1999; 27 years ago University of California, Los Angeles
- Type: Social
- Affiliation: NIC
- Former affiliation: NAPA
- Status: Active
- Emphasis: South Asian
- Scope: International
- Motto: "Above All Else, Brotherhood"
- Pillars: Brotherhood, Tradition, Service to Humanity, South Asian Awareness, Academic Excellence, and Nationwide Network.
- Colors: Black Silver White
- Flower: Orchid
- Mascot: Rampant lion
- Philanthropy: Mental health
- Chapters: 11 active
- Colonies: 6
- Members: 2,000+ lifetime
- Nickname: Beta Chi
- Headquarters: 5868 E. 71st Street, #E-120; Indianapolis, Illinois 46220; United States
- Website: www.betachitheta.com

Beta Chi Theta (ΒΧΘ, also known as Beta Chi) is a South Asian-interest collegiate social fraternity in the United States. It was established at the University of California, Los Angeles in 1999. The fraternity is a member of the North American Interfraternity Conference.

== History ==
Beta Chi Theta originated with eight students at the University of California, Los Angeles in the spring of 1999 as a South Asian-based fraternity. On June 2, 1999, Beta Chi Theta officially received recognition by the university and was granted membership into the UCLA Inter-Fraternity Council; this is used as the fraternity's founding date. Its eight founders were Abu Abraham, Hashu Datwani, Samir Khandhar, Ankur Kumar, Ashish Nagdev, Ankur Parikh, Roshan Patel, and Ali Zhumkhawala.

In 2021, Beta Chi Theta became a national fraternity with the chartering of Beta chapter at Baylor University and Gamma chapter at California State Polytechnic University, Pomona. The fraternity held its first national convention in 2003, where its constitution and bylaws were adopted and a national board was established. The fraternity was incorporated in Texas as Beta Chi Theta National Fraternity, Inc. in 2004.

On April 23, 2006, Beta Chi Theta became the first nationally recognized South Asian-based fraternity to become a member of the North American Interfraternity Conference (NIC). It has since been the youngest fraternity to become a member of the NIC. Beta Chi Theta was also a member of the National APIDA Panhellenic Association, but left that organization on November 18, 2023.

Beta Chi Theta has chartered more than 30 chapters and more than 2,000 alumni. Its headquarters is in Indianapolis, Indiana.

== Symbols ==
The fraternity's Greek letters, Beta Chi Theta, stand for Brotherhood, Culture, and Tradition. Its motto is "Above all else, Brotherhood".

Beta Chi Theta's pillars are "Brotherhood, Tradition, Service to Humanity, South Asian Awareness, and Academic Excellence". Its colors are black, silver, and white. Its mascot is that of a rampant lion. Its flower is the orchard.

== Philanthropy ==
The fraternity's primary philanthropic focus is mental health awareness.

== Chapters ==
Following is a list of Beta Chi Theta chapters, with active chapters indicated in bold and inactive chapters in italics.

Chapter	Charter date and range	Institution	Location	Status	Ref.
Alpha	June 2, 1999 – 20xx ?	University of California, Los Angeles	Los Angeles, California	Inactive	
Beta	January 3, 2001 – 20xx ?	Baylor University	Waco, Texas	Inactive	
Gamma	April 2001–20xx ?	California State Polytechnic University, Pomona	Pomona, California	Inactive	
Delta	April 2002–2017	University of Oklahoma	Norman, Oklahoma	Inactive	
Epsilon	August 2002–2017	University of California, Riverside	Riverside, California	Inactive	
Zeta	2003–20xx ?	University of California, San Diego	San Diego, California	Inactive	
Eta	2003–2021	University of Texas at Austin	Austin, Texas	Inactive	
Theta	2004–202x ?	Vanderbilt University	Nashville, Tennessee	Inactive	
**Iota**	October 2004	Purdue University	West Lafayette, Indiana	Active	
**Kappa**	2005–202x ?	Florida Atlantic University	Boca Raton, Florida	Colony	
**Lambda**	2006	University of Minnesota	Minneapolis, Minnesota	Active	
**Mu**	May 2008	University of Florida	Gainesville, Florida	Active	
Nu	2009–20xx ?	University of Wisconsin–Madison	Madison, Wisconsin	Inactive	
**Xi**	2009–2018	University of Houston	Houston, Texas	Colony	
**Omicron**	2010–20xx ?	Emory University	Atlanta, Georgia	Colony	
Pi	2010–20xx ?	Texas A&M University	College Station, Texas	Inactive	
Rho	April 30, 2010 – 2019	University of Tennessee	Knoxville, Tennessee	Inactive	
**Sigma**	May 2010	Rutgers University	New Brunswick, New Jersey	Active	
**Tau**	2010–20xx ?	University of South Florida	Tampa, Florida	Colony	
**Upsilon**	May 2010	University of Texas at Dallas	Richardson, Texas	Active	
**Phi**	December 4, 2010	University of Illinois at Urbana–Champaign	Champaign, Illinois	Active	
**Chi**	April 2006			Memorial	
Psi	2011–2018	University of Connecticut	Storrs, Connecticut	Inactive	
Omega	2011–2023	University of Alabama at Birmingham	Birmingham, Alabama	Inactive	
Alpha Alpha	2011–202x ?	Northeastern University	Boston, Massachusetts	Inactive	
**Alpha Beta**	April 2013	Drexel University	Philadelphia, Pennsylvania	Active	
**Alpha Gamma**	December 2014	University of Massachusetts Amherst	Amherst, Massachusetts	Active	
**Alpha Delta**	April 2017	Indiana University Bloomington	Bloomington, Indiana	Active	
**Alpha Epsilon**	December 2017	University of Georgia	Athens, Georgia	Active	
**Alpha Zeta**	April 2018	Arizona State University	Tempe, Arizona	Active	
**Alpha Eta**	April 2019–20xx ?	Binghamton University	Binghamton, New York	Colony	
**Alpha Theta**	March 17, 2024	University of California, Davis	Davis, California	Active	
**Alpha Iota**		Acharya Institutes	Bengaluru, India	Colony	

== See also ==
- List of Asian American fraternities and sororities
- List of social fraternities
