= Iota Nu Delta =

American South Asian-interest collegiate fraternity

- ΙΝΔ
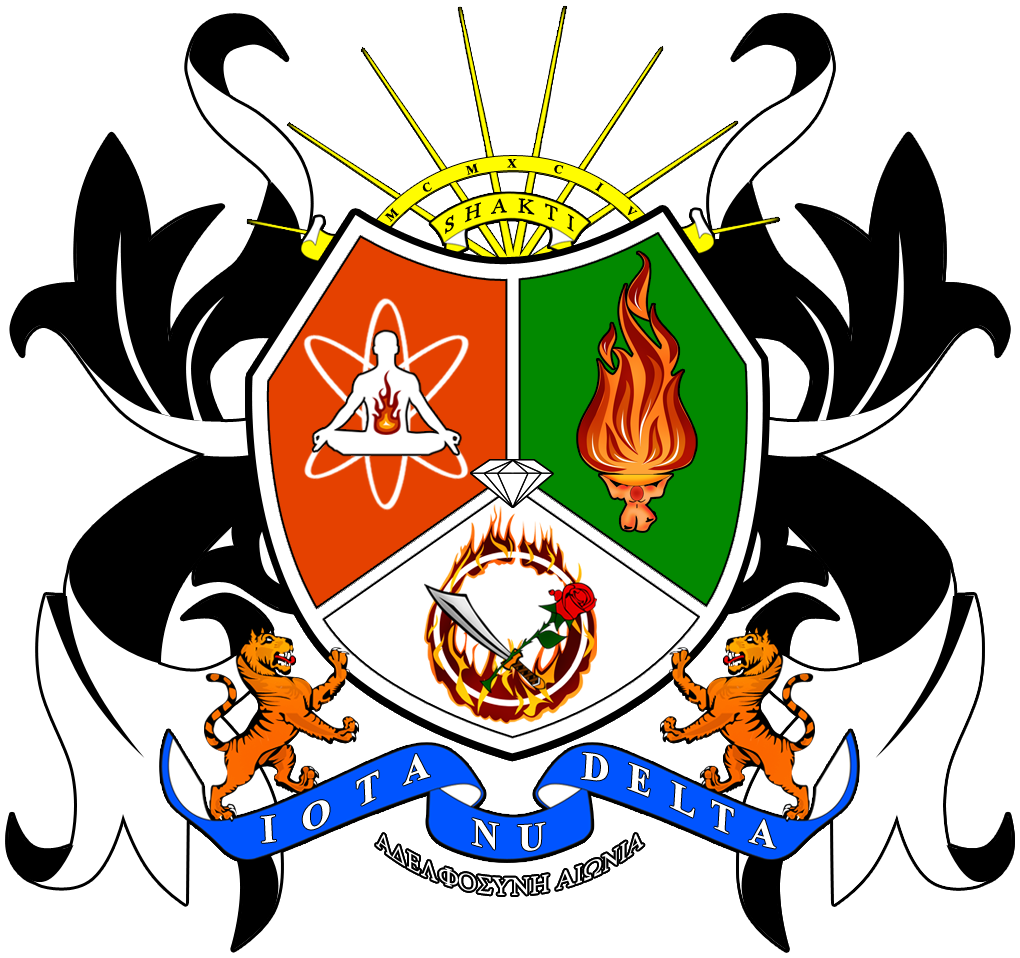
- Founded: February 7, 1994 (32 years ago); Binghamton University
- Type: Social
- Affiliation: NAPA; NIC
- Status: Active
- Emphasis: South Asian
- Scope: International
- Motto: "Is The Fire In You?" "Imitated Never Duplicated"
- Colors: Orange and Green
- Symbol: Rose over Sword
- Jewel: Diamond
- Publication: The ΙΝΔ Insider
- Chapters: 10 active, 31 installed
- Members: 1,000 active
- Headquarters: New York City, New York; United States
- Website: www.iotanudelta.com

Iota Nu Delta (ΙΝΔ, also IND) is the first South Asian interest college fraternity. IND was founded in 1994 at the Binghamton University. It is a member of the North American Interfraternity Conference since 2007 and National APIDA Panhellenic Association since 2016.

== Founding ==
On February 7, 1994, eight male students at Binghamton University in Vestal, New York, founded the first South-Asian Interest Greek Organization. Their stated goal in forming the organization was to bridge the gaps between people of different backgrounds, ethnicity, and cultures while promoting South Asian (Indian, Pakistani, and Bangladeshi) cultural awareness. The first eight members, known as the national Founding Fathers, of Iota Nu Delta Fraternity, Inc. are Sachin Chopra, Samir Chopra, Ankur Desai, Shaiju Eapen, Varun Gujral, Stanley Jacob, Johri Mathew, and Renjy Vattasseril.

Iota Nu Delta Fraternity, Inc. is South Asian-based, but is not exclusive to men of South-Asian origin.

== Symbols ==
The fraternity's mottos are "Is The Fire In You?" and "Imitated Never Duplicated". Its colors are orange and green. Its symbol is a rose over a sword. Its jewel is the diamond. Its publication is The ΙΝΔ Insider.

== Philanthropy ==
Iota Nu Delta has established mental health awareness and advocacy as its primary philanthropic focus and works in partnership with Active Minds.

Additionally, Iota Nu Delta supports bone marrow advocacy through the National Marrow Donor Program & SAMAR (South Asian Marrow Association of Recruiters). Iota Nu Delta is also involved with several other national non-profit organizations including the United Service Organizations, Association for India's Development, and SAALT (South Asian Americans Leading Together). Much of the fundraising for their causes being done through fraternity-specific banquets at the local level or collaborative social events like "The Official Four Way: World Tour" with other fraternal Greek-lettered organizations like Alpha Phi Alpha, Lambda Upsilon Lambda, and Pi Delta Psi.

== Chapters ==
Following is a list of chapters and colonies of Iota Nu Delta. Active chapters are indicated in bold, inactive groups are in italics.

Chapter	Charter date and range	Institution	Location	Status	Ref.
Alpha	1994	Binghamton University	Binghamton, New York	Inactive	
Beta	199x	New York University	New York City, New York	Inactive	
**Gamma**	1997	Drexel University	Philadelphia, Pennsylvania	Active	
Delta	199x	State University of New York at Buffalo	Buffalo, New York	Inactive	
**Epsilon**	1999	State University of New York at Stony Brook	Stony Brook, New York	Active	
Zeta	xxxx	University of Debrecen	Debrecen, Hungary	Inactive	
Eta	2003	University of Maryland, College Park	College Park, Maryland	Inactive	
Theta	2006	George Washington University and Georgetown University	Washington, D.C.	Inactive	
**Iota**	2006	St. John's University	New York City, New York	Active	
**Kappa**	200x	Temple University	Philadelphia, Pennsylvania	Active	
Lambda	2008	Long Island University	New York City, New York	Inactive	
**Mu**	2009	Rutgers University–New Brunswick	New Brunswick, New Jersey	Active	
Nu	2009	University of Texas at San Antonio	San Antonio, Texas	Inactive	
**Xi**	2002	New York Institute of Technology - Old Westbury Campus	Old Westbury, New York	Active	
Omicron	200x	City University of New York	New York City, New York	Inactive	(Note: Charter has a city wide scope that excludes the borough of Staten Island. Includes most component institutions of the CUNY such as Baruch College. Excludes City College of New York and College of Staten Island.)
Pi	2011	Pennsylvania State University	University Park, Pennsylvania	Inactive	
**Rho**	2011	City College of New York	New York City, New York	Active	
**Sigma**	2017	George Mason University	Fairfax, Virginia	Active	
**Tau**	2010	East Carolina University	Greenville, North Carolina	Active	
**University of Pittsburgh Colony**	2009–xxxx, 2019	University of Pittsburgh	Pittsburgh, Pennsylvania	Active	
**Adelphi University Colony**	xxxx	Adelphi University	Garden City, New York	Active	
University of Maryland, Baltimore County Colony	xxxx	University of Maryland, Baltimore County	Catonsville, Maryland	Inactive	
Staten Island Colony	xxxx	College of Staten Island	Staten Island, New York	Inactive	(Note: Charter has a borough wide scope to include institutions such as Wagner College.)
Newark Colony	xxxx	New Jersey Institute of Technology and Rutgers University–Newark)	Newark, New Jersey	Inactive	(Note: Charter has a city wide scope.)
Virginia Tech Colony	2024	Virginia Polytechnic Institute and State University	Blacksburg, Virginia	Inactive	

== See also ==
- List of social fraternities
- List of Asian American fraternities and sororities
- Cultural interest fraternities and sororities
