= Delta Phi Omega =

American South Asian-interest sorority

- ΔΦΩ
- Founded: December 6, 1998; 27 years ago University of Houston
- Type: Social
- Affiliation: NAPA
- Status: Active
- Emphasis: cultural interest - South Asian interest
- Scope: National
- Motto: "We Dreamt, We Saw, We Conquered"
- Pillars: Sisterhood, Honesty, Loyalty, Respect, and Friendship
- Colors: Red, Black, and Silver
- Flower: White orchid
- Jewel: Red ruby, diamond
- Mascot: Bengal tiger
- Philanthropy: Children's education and literacy
- Chapters: 25
- Colonies: 26
- Members: 2,000+ active
- Nickname: DPO
- Headquarters: 2020 Bailey Street; Houston, Texas 77006; United States
- Website: www.deltaphiomega.org

Delta Phi Omega (commonly referred to as DPO, or ΔΦΩ) is a nationally based, South Asian-interest, multicultural sorority in the United States. It is a social, service, and philanthropy-based Greek letter organization whose main focus is to empower women and promote cultural awareness through involvement with their universities and communities.

It is a member of the National APIDA Panhellenic Association (NAPA). Delta Phi Omega Sorority, Inc. is the largest South Asian interest-based sorority in the nation. It has over 2,600 sisters in 25 chapters and 26 colonies across the country.

== History ==
On December 6, 1998, sixteen South Asian women formed Delta Phi Omega at the University of Houston. The sixteen Honorable National Founding Mothers are Simran Bakshi-Guiterrez, Heena Bhakta-Palmer, Leena Cherian-Joseph, Bonna Choudhari, Rita Dhanani-Rauniyar, Anita Jari-Kharbanda, Amitha Nikam-Verma, Avni Patel, Jesika Patel, Jolly Patel, Shevon Patel, Sonal Amit Patel, Arati Shah, Deepa Swamy-Kurian, Manisha Vakharia-Patel, and Sarika Wadhawan.

Delta Phi Omega was envisioned as an organization that would focus on the diverse Indian culture through participation in various community and service projects, promote the advancement of South Asian women, and unite women in the South Asian community.

It is a member of the National APIDA Panhellenic Association (NAPA). Delta Phi Omega Sorority, Inc. is the largest South Asian interest-based sorority in the nation. It has over 2,000 sisters in 25 chapters and 26 colonies across the country.

== Symbols ==
Delta Phi Omega's motto is "We Dreamt, We Saw, We Conquered". Its pillars are sisterhood, honesty, loyalty, respect, and friendship.

The sorority's colors are red, black, and silver. Its flower is the white orchid. Its mascot is the Bengal tiger. The sorority's jewels are ruby red and diamond.

== Activities ==
The sorority's annual national initiatives are "Be The Change" National Community Partner and Literacy Through Unity Week. The annual Literacy Through Unity Week raises awareness of children's education and literacy, along with fundraising at the respective universities and cities to support related charities. Events associated with Literacy Through Unity Week include community service projects, movie nights, books and panel discussions, fundraising nights, and Informationals by nonprofit organizations such as Asha for Education, Pratham, and CARE.

== Organization ==
In 2001, sisters foresaw a rapid expansion of Delta Phi Omega and recognized the need for a central governing body. Therefore, they founded the first National Council of Delta Phi Omega on February 1, 2002, which became the administrative entity of the sorority. The National Council ensures the continuity of the original purpose, mission, and ideals of the National Founding Mothers. Its functions also include handling matters of controversy, coordinating national-level programs, and overseeing chapter compliance with national policies. Each year at the national conference women are elected to the National Council, board, and regional director positions.

After the National Council, the next tier is the National Board, which is made up of positions that are more geared towards expansion and maintaining the sorority on an organizational level, keeping records, and ensuring everything continues to run smoothly and professionally.

Following the National Board are Regional Directors. Delta Phi Omega is currently divided into nine regions, with each region consisting of about four to nine schools. The final tier is an Alumna Advisor, which each charter has.

== Chapters ==
In the following list, active chapters and charters are listed in bold and inactive chapters and charters are in italics.

Chapter	Charter date and range	Institution or region	Location	Status	Ref.
Alpha	December 6, 1998	University of Houston	Houston, Texas	Inactive	
Beta	May 17, 1999	University of Texas at San Antonio	San Antonio, Texas	Inactive	
Gamma	March 17, 2000	Philadelphia Citywide	Philadelphia, Pennsylvania	Active	(Note: Includes Drexel University, Temple University, Thomas Jefferson University, the University of Pennsylvania, the University of Pennsylvania, University of the Sciences, and University of the Sciences.)
Delta	November 4, 2001	DePaul University	Chicago, Illinois	Inactive	
Eta	November 11, 2001	Florida International University	Miami, Florida	Inactive	
Epsilon	April 13, 2002	University of Texas at Austin	Austin, Texas	Active	
Zeta	May 4, 2002	University of Maryland, College Park	College Park, Maryland	Active	
Theta	September 14, 2002	University of Oklahoma	Norman, Oklahoma	Inactive	
Kappa	January 11, 2003	Virginia Commonwealth University	Richmond, Virginia	Inactive	
Iota	January 25, 2003	Northeastern University	Boston, Massachusetts	Inactive	
Pace University charter	May 10, 2003	Pace University	Pleasantville, New York	Active	
Pace University charter	May 10, 2003	Pace University	New York City, New York	Active	
Sigma	April 13, 2003	University of Florida	Gainesville, Florida	Active	
University of Texas at Arlington charter	July 12, 2003	University of Texas at Arlington	Arlington, Texas	Active	
University of Washington charter	September 21, 2003	University of Washington	Seattle, Washington	Inactive	
Stony Brook University charter	April 14, 2004	Stony Brook University	Stony Brook, New York	Inactive	
Penn State University charter	May 6, 2004	Penn State University	University Park, Pennsylvania	Inactive	
University of North Texas charter	August 28, 2004	University of North Texas	Denton, Texas	Inactive	
Texas Women's University charter	August 28, 2004	Texas Woman's University	Denton, Texas	Inactive	
Lambda	October 17, 2004	University of South Florida	Tampa, Florida	Inactive	
Mu	April 17, 2005	University of Illinois at Chicago	Chicago, Illinois	Active	
New Jersey Institute of Technology charter	July 11, 2005	New Jersey Institute of Technology	Newark, New Jersey	Inactive	
University of Maryland, Baltimore County charter	July 27, 2005	University of Maryland, Baltimore County	Baltimore, Maryland	Inactive	
University of California, San Diego charter	December 3, 2005	University of California, San Diego	San Diego, California	Inactive	
Nu	May 28, 2006	Oregon State University	Corvallis, Oregon	Inactive	
Pi	October 2, 2006	Texas A&M University	College Station, Texas	Inactive	
University of North Carolina at Chapel Hill charter	October 20, 2006	University of North Carolina at Chapel Hill	Chapel Hill, North Carolina	Active	
Purdue University charter	March 3, 2007	Purdue University	West Lafayette, Indiana	Inactive	
Xi	July 28, 2007	University of Tennessee	Knoxville, Tennessee	Inactive	
Omicron	July 14, 2009	University of Georgia	Athens, Georgia	Active	
Indiana University at Bloomington charter	April 15, 2009	Indiana University Bloomington	Bloomington, Indiana	Inactive	
Boston University charter	May 8, 2009	Boston University	Boston Massachusetts	Inactive	
Baylor University charter	September 30, 2009	Baylor University	Waco, Texas	Inactive	
Emory University charter	November 21, 2009	Emory University	Atlanta, Georgia	Inactive	
University of California, Davis charter	February 24, 2010	University of California, Davis	Davis, California	Inactive	
University of Rochester charter	April 25, 2010	University of Rochester	Rochester, New York	Inactive	
Upsilon	August 2, 2010	Rutgers University–New Brunswick	New Brunswick, New Jersey	Active	
Rho	January 8, 2011	University of Alabama at Birmingham	Birmingham, Alabama	Inactive	
Phi	January 30, 2011	Wayne State University	Detroit, Michigan	Inactive	
University of Miami charter	March 30, 2011	University of Miami	Coral Gables, Florida	Inactive	
Alpha Alpha	May 1, 2011	University of Minnesota	Minneapolis, Minnesota	Inactive	
George Mason University charter	November 11, 2011	George Mason University	Fairfax, Virginia	Inactive	
Tau	October 23, 2011	Georgia State University	Atlanta, Georgia	Inactive	
East Carolina University charter	April 14, 2012	East Carolina University	Greenville, North Carolina	Inactive	
Psi	September 7, 2012	University of Central Florida	Orlando, Florida	Active	
Alpha Gamma	February 18, 2013	Texas Tech University	Lubbock, Texas	Active	
Chi	April 20, 2013	Rutgers University–Newark	Newark, New Jersey	Inactive	
Omega				Memorial	
Alpha Beta	April 21, 2014	University of Illinois Urbana-Champaign	Urbana, Illinois	Active	
College of William & Mary charter	November 6, 2016	College of William & Mary	Williamsburg, Virginia	Inactive	
Binghamton University charter	November 12, 2016	Binghamton University	Binghamton, New York	Inactive	
Alpha Delta	November 11, 2017	University of Connecticut	Storrs, Connecticut	Active	
University of South Carolina charter	March 8, 2019	University of South Carolina	Columbia, South Carolina	Active	
Alpha Zeta	November 17, 2019	Ohio State University	Columbus, Ohio	Active	
Hofstra University charter	May 1, 2020	Hofstra University	Hempstead, New York	Active	
Adelphi University charter	April 11, 2021	Adelphi University	Garden City, New York	Active	
Saint Louis University charter	April 30, 2021	Saint Louis University	St. Louis, Missouri	Active	
Alpha Epsilon Chapter	May 23, 2021	City College of New York	New York City, New York	Active	
Syracuse University charter	November 16, 2022	Syracuse University	Syracuse, New York	Active	

== See also ==
- List of social sororities and women's fraternities
- List of Asian American fraternities and sororities
- Cultural interest fraternities and sororities
