= Kappa Phi Lambda =

American Asian-interest sorority

- ΚΦΛ
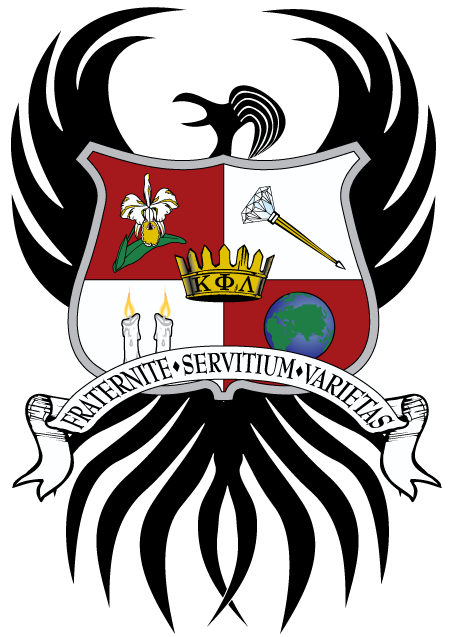
- Founded: March 9, 1995; 31 years ago Binghamton University
- Type: Social
- Affiliation: NAPA
- Status: Active
- Emphasis: Cultural
- Scope: National
- Pillars: Sisterhood, Service, and Cultural Diversity
- Colors: Red, White, and Heather Grey
- Flower: Orchid
- Jewel: Diamond
- Mascot: Phoenix
- Philanthropy: CARE
- Chapters: 25
- Colonies: 10
- Members: 4,000+ lifetime
- Nicknames: Kappas, KPL
- Headquarters: 34 3rd Avenue #147; New York City, New York 10003; United States
- Website: kplsorority.org

Kappa Phi Lambda Sorority, Inc. (ΚΦΛ also known as Kappas and KPL) is an Asian-interest sorority that was founded in 1995 at Binghamton University in Binghamton, New York. The sorority is represented at 34 schools with over 4,000 members nationally. It is a member of the National APIDA Panhellenic Association (NAPA).

== History ==
Seven women came together to establish Kappa Phi Lambda Sorority, Inc. at Binghamton University on March 9, 1995. The seven founders were Elizabeth Choi, Karen Eng, Rei Hirasawa, Hee Cho Moon, Chae Yoo Park, Samantha Somchanhmavong, and Connie Yang.

The sorority was conceived through the notion of an organization that would provide a culturally sound and educationally inspiring grounding for Asian-American women. These women saw there was a need for an organization of this kind that would give inspiration and education to their community.

This sorority is open to women of all nationalities and backgrounds who want to learn about, actively speak for, and represent Pan-Asian culture.

== Symbols ==
The sorority's colors are red, white, and heather grey. Its flower is the orchid. Its jewel is the diamond. The sorority's mascot is the phoenix. The pillars of Kappa Phi Lambda are "Sisterhood, Service, and Cultural Diversity".

== Philanthropy ==
Kappa Phi Lambda has selected CARE, a leading humanitarian organization fighting global poverty, as its national philanthropy. The organization also takes initiative in spreading cultural awareness regarding Asian American culture through events like "Amazing Race: Asian Edition" which is regularly hosted alongside fellow undergraduate chapters of the fraternity Pi Delta Psi.

== Chapters ==
There are currently 25 active chapters and 10 associate chapters of Kappa Phi Lambda. Active chapters are indicated in bold. Inactive chapters are indicated in italic.

Chapter	Charter date and range	Institution	Location	Status	Ref.
**Alpha**	March 9, 1995	Binghamton University	Binghamton, New York	Active	
Beta	February 22, 1997 – 2015	University at Buffalo	Buffalo, New York	Inactive	
**Gamma**	November 16, 1997	Syracuse University	Syracuse, New York	Active	
**Delta**	February 28, 1998	Stony Brook University	Stony Brook, New York	Active	
**Epsilon Associate chapter**	March 7, 1998 – Spring 2010; May 1, 2016	New York University	New York, New York	Active	(Note: Re-established as an associate chapter in 2016)
**Zeta**	January 10, 1998	St. John's University	Queens, New York	Active	
**Eta**	November 7, 1999	Rutgers University	New Brunswick, New Jersey	Active	
Theta	August 20, 1999 – 2018	Baruch College	New York, New York	Inactive	
**Iota**	May 19, 2000	Cornell University	Ithaca, New York	Active	
Lambda	July 8, 2001 – 20xx ?	University of Maryland, Baltimore	Baltimore, MD	Inactive	
**Mu**	May 12, 2001	University of Massachusetts Amherst	Amherst, Massachusetts	Active	
**Nu**	November 23, 2002	Northwestern University	Evanston, Illinois	Active	
**Xi**	June 15, 2002	Northeastern University	Boston, Massachusetts	Active	
**Omicron**	May 31, 2003	Ohio State University	Columbus, Ohio	Active	
**Pi**	November 3, 2002 – May 16, 2014; November 17, 2018	Carnegie Mellon University	Pittsburgh, Pennsylvania	Active	(Note: Re-established as an associate chapter in 2018. Regained chapter status in 2023.)
**Rho**	April 3, 2004	University of Florida	Gainesville, Florida	Active	
**Sigma**	April 10, 2004	University of Connecticut	Storrs, Connecticut	Active	
**Tau**	December 6, 2003	Columbia University	New York, New York	Active	
**Upsilon Associate chapter**	November 14, 2004	University at Albany	Albany, New York	Active	
**Phi**	April 13, 2003	University of Michigan, Ann Arbor	Ann Arbor, Michigan	Active	
**Chi**	November 14, 2004	University of Maryland, College Park	College Park, Maryland	Active	
**Psi**	November 12, 2006	University of Illinois at Urbana-Champaign	Champaign, Illinois	Active	
**Alpha Alpha**	November 13, 2004	George Mason University	Fairfax, Virginia	Active	
**Alpha Beta**	May 10, 2008	George Washington University	Washington, D.C.	Active	
**Alpha Gamma**	November 21, 2009	University of Texas at Austin	Austin, Texas	Active	
**Alpha Delta**	February 21, 2004	Northern Illinois University	DeKalb, Illinois	Active	
**Alpha Epsilon**	November 10, 2012	North Carolina State University	Raleigh, North Carolina	Active	
**Alpha Zeta**	November 14, 2015	University of South Florida	Tampa, Florida	Active	
**Alpha Eta**	November 23, 2013	University of North Carolina at Chapel Hill	Chapel Hill, North Carolina	Active	
**Alpha Theta**	May 2, 2015	University of Nevada, Reno	Reno, Nevada	Active	
**Alpha Iota**	March 9, 2019	Drexel University	Philadelphia, Pennsylvania	Active	
Associate chapter	April 22, 2006 – 20xx ?	Miami University	Oxford, Ohio	Inactive	
Associate chapter	April 3, 2010 – 20xx ?	Duke University	Durham, North Carolina	Inactive	
Associate chapter	April 20, 2013 – 20xx ?	University of Denver	Denver, Colorado	Inactive	
**Associate chapter**	November 11, 2017	University of North Carolina at Charlotte	Charlotte, North Carolina	Active	
Associate chapter	April 14, 2018 – 20xx ?	American University	Washington, D.C.	Inactive	
**Associate chapter**	April 13, 2019	University of North Carolina at Greensboro	Greensboro, North Carolina	Active	
**Associate chapter**	March 28, 2020	University of Cincinnati	Cincinnati, Ohio	Active	
**Associate chapter**	March 7, 2021	University of Minnesota, Twin Cities	Minneapolis, Minnesota	Active	
**Associate chapter**	April 1, 2022	Wright State University	Dayton, Ohio	Active	
**Associate chapter**	November 12, 2022	Elon University	Elon, North Carolina	Active	
**Associate chapter**	October 21, 2023	Creighton University	Omaha, Nebraska	Active	

== See also ==
- List of social sororities and women's fraternities
- List of Asian American fraternities and sororities
- Cultural interest fraternities and sororities
