= Alpha Phi Gamma (sorority) =

American collegiate Asian-interest sorority

- ΑΦΓ
- Founded: February 1, 1994; 32 years ago California State Polytechnic University, Pomona
- Type: Social
- Affiliation: NAPA
- Status: Active
- Emphasis: Asian-American
- Scope: National
- Motto: "To bring together all women of different nationalities through bonds of friendship and sisterhood"
- Colors: Burgundy and Crème
- Flower: Tulip
- Jewel: Ruby and diamond
- Mascot: Baby panda bear
- Philanthropy: Fight Against Violence Towards Women
- Chapters: 14 active
- Colonies: 2
- Members: 2,100+ lifetime
- Nickname: APhiG
- Headquarters: P.O. Box 1333; La Mesa, California 91944; United States
- Website: www.alphaphigamma.org

Alpha Phi Gamma National Sorority, Inc. (ΑΦΓ), also known as APhiG and Alpha Phi Gamma, is an American Asian-interest sorority. It was founded at California State Polytechnic University, Pomona in 1994. The sorority is a member of the National APIDA Panhellenic Association.

== History ==
Alpha Phi Gamma was founded on February 1, 1994, and is the first Asian-American interest sorority established at California State Polytechnic University, Pomona. Its founders were Allex Choi, Candy Cunanan, Grace Hsieh, Kolleen Kim, Christine Nguyen, Jennifer Oku, and Sandie Rillera. The founders wanted to promote Asian awareness and service to the university.

Alpha Phi Gamma became a national sorority with the establishment of Beta chapter at Northern Illinois University in 1999. That was followed by Gamma at San Diego State University in 2000 and Delta at the University of Arizona in 2002. As of 2025, the sorority has initiated more than 2,100 members and established twenty chapters.

Alpha Phi Gamma is a member of the National APIDA Panhellenic Association (NAPA). Its national headquarters is in La Mesa, California.

== Symbols ==
The motto of Alpha Phi Gamma is "To bring together all women of different nationalities through bonds of friendship and sisterhood". The sorority's colors are burgundy and creme. Its flower is the tulip. Its jewels are ruby and diamond. Its mascot is the baby panda bear. Its nickname is APhiG.

== Philanthropy ==
Alpha Phi Gamma's official National Philanthropy is the "Fight Against Violence Towards Women". In November 2009, Alpha Phi Gamma became a member of the National Coalition Against Domestic Violence.

== Chapters ==
Following is a list of Alpha Phi Gamma's charters, with active chapters in bold and inactive chapters in italics.

Charter	Charter date and range	Institution	Location	Status	Ref.
**Alpha**	February 1, 1994	California State Polytechnic University, Pomona	Pomona, California	Active	
**Beta**	June 14, 1999	Northern Illinois University	DeKalb, Illinois	Active	
**Gamma**	May 20, 2000	San Diego State University	San Diego, California	Active	
**Delta**	May 26, 2002	University of Arizona	Tucson, Arizona	Active	
Epsilon	May 28, 2006	DePaul University	Chicago, Illinois	Inactive	
Zeta	May 28, 2006	Michigan State University	East Lansing, Michigan	Inactive	
**Eta**	July 18, 2009	University of Missouri	Columbia, Missouri	Active	
**Theta**	June 26, 2010	Colorado State University	Fort Collins, Colorado	Active	
**Iota**	June 16, 2012	University of Nevada, Las Vegas	Paradise, Nevada	Active	
**Kappa**	May 21, 2011	University of Nevada, Reno	Reno, Nevada	Active	
**Lambda**	February 26, 2012	University of Illinois at Chicago	Chicago, Illinois	Active	
Omega	November 2013			Memorial	
**Mu**	June 15, 2014	University of Minnesota-Twin Cities	Minneapolis, Minnesota	Active	
**Nu**	June 14, 2015	North Carolina State University	Raleigh, North Carolina	Active	
**Xi**	May 21, 2017	Arizona State University	Tempe, Arizona	Active	
**Omicron**	April 13, 2019	University of Illinois at Urbana-Champaign	Urbana, Illinois	Active	
**Pi**	September 6, 2020	University of Wisconsin-Whitewater	Whitewater, Wisconsin	Active	
**Rho**	December 3, 2022	Kansas State University	Manhattan, Kansas	Active	
Provisional	April 20, 2024	Duquesne University	Pittsburgh, Pennsylvania	Active	

== See also ==
- List of social sororities and women's fraternities
- List of Asian American fraternities and sororities
- Cultural interest fraternities and sororities
