= Sigma Beta Rho =

American multicultural collegiate fraternity

- ΣΒΡ
- Founded: August 16, 1996; 29 years ago University of Pennsylvania
- Type: Social
- Affiliation: NAPA; NIC
- Status: Active
- Emphasis: Multicultural
- Scope: National (US)
- Motto: "Brotherhood Beyond All Barriers"
- Pillars: Society, Brotherhood, Remembrance
- Colors: Red, Black, and Green
- Symbol: King Cobra
- Chapters: 18 active
- Colonies: 10 associate and colonies
- Members: 3,000+ lifetime
- Nickname: SigRho, SBRho
- Headquarters: PO Box 4668 #20910; New York City, New York 10163-4668; United States
- Website: sigrho.com

Sigma Beta Rho Fraternity, Inc. (ΣΒΡ, also SigRho) is an American collegiate and national multicultural fraternity. Founded in 1996, it was the first national multicultural fraternity in the United States.

== History ==
Sigma Beta Rho was founded on August 16, 1996, at the University of Pennsylvania in Philadelphia as a South Asian interest fraternity. Its founders originally attended three different college campuses and came together to form the fraternity. The first eight members of the fraternity's are its national founding fathers: Russell Abdullah, Anuj Datta, Neil Datta, Rajan Dogra, Suman Ghosh, Shoor Kalam, Saiful Khandker, and Bonit Sharma.

Beta chapter was chartered at Binghamton University on August 22, 1998. That same year, the fraternity was incorporated in the State Department of New York. In its first few years of existence, Sigma Beta Rho changed its focus from a South-Asian interest fraternity to one with a multicultural mission. It promotes cultural awareness and spreads a positive image of diversity.

Sigma Beta Rho was a founding member of the National APIDA Panhellenic Association (NAPA). Sigma Beta Rho member Akash Kuruvilla co-authored the original constitution of NAPA. The fraternity was also accepted into the North American Interfraternity Conference (NIC) on April 15, 2007, as its 69th member organization.

Since 1998, Sigma Beta Rho has initiated over 3,000 members.

== Symbols ==
The colors of Sigma Beta Rho are red, black, and green. Its symbol is the King Cobra. Its motto is "Brotherhood Beyond All Barriers". Its pillars are "Society, Brotherhood, Remembrance". Its nicknames are SBRho and SigRho.

== Philanthropy ==
The fraternity’s national philanthropic focus is on its partnership with SOS Children's Villages. Local chapter efforts have supported Habitat for Humanity, Read Across America, and Relay for Life.

== Organization ==
The national executive board is the governing body that presides over the nationwide fraternity. The fraternity's national headquarters is in New York City, New York.

== Chapters ==
Sigma Beta Rho used the term "entities" for its colonies, associate chapters, and chapters. A colony is a new group, working meeting the requirements to charter as a chapter. A colony becomes an associate chapter after a certain amount of time and after meeting requirements for membership, finances, and community service. Associate chapters are chartered as a chapter after maintaining the requirements for an associate chapter for an established period of time.

In the following list, active chapters indicated in bold and inactive chapters are in italics.

Chapter	Charter date and range	Institution	Location	Status	Ref.
Alpha	August 16, 1996 – 20xx ?	University of Pennsylvania	Philadelphia, Pennsylvania	Inactive	
Beta	August 22, 1998 – 20xx ?	Binghamton University	Binghamton, New York	Inactive	
Gamma	August 22, 1998 – 20xx ?	St. John's University	Queens, New York	Inactive	
Delta	1998–20xx ?	Hofstra University	Hempstead, New York	Inactive	
Epsilon	September 1, 1999 – 20xx ?	Pace University	New York City, New York	Inactive	
Zeta	February 2, 2000 – July 2020	Stony Brook University	Stony Brook, New York	Inactive	(Note: Chapter was suspended and is eligible for reinstatement in 2026.)
Eta	June 1, 2002 – 20xx ?	Boston College	Chestnut Hill, Massachusetts	Inactive	
**Theta**	June 17, 2001	Rutgers University	New Brunswick, New Jersey	Active	
**Iota**	January 18, 2003 – 20xx ?	University of Washington	Seattle, Washington	Active	
Kappa	December 10, 2002 – 20xx ?	University of Rochester	Rochester, New York	Inactive	
Lambda	November 24, 2002 – 20xx ?	Virginia Commonwealth University	Richmond, Virginia	Inactive	
**Mu**	August 25, 2001	University of South Florida	Tampa, Florida	Active	
**Nu**	May 9, 2004	University of Georgia	Athens, Georgia	Active	
Xi	April 27, 2003 – 20xx ?	University of Maryland, College Park	College Park, Maryland	Inactive	
Omicron	December 13, 2003 – 20xx ?	University of Maryland, Baltimore County	Catonsville, Maryland	Inactive	(Note: Chapter was eligible for reinstatment in 2019.)
Pi	May 31, 2002 – 2019	University of Florida	Gainesville, Florida	Inactive	
**Rho**	November 20, 2004	Temple University	Philadelphia, Pennsylvania	Inactive	
**Sigma**	April 2, 2005	Georgia Tech	Atlanta, Georgia	Active	
Tau	March 4, 2004 – 20xx ?	University of Houston	Houston, Texas	Inactive	
**Upsilon**	March 30, 2002	Drexel University	Philadelphia, Pennsylvania	Active	
Phi	April 26, 2003 – c. 2022	University of the Sciences	Philadelphia, Pennsylvania	Inactive	(Note: Chapter was formed at the University of the Sciences, which merged into Saint Joseph's University on June 1, 2022.)
Chi				Unassigned	
Psi	November 19, 2004 – 20xx ?	Embry–Riddle Aeronautical University	Daytona Beach, Florida	Inactive	
Omega				Unassigned	
**Alpha Alpha**	December 10, 2005	Florida State University	Tallahassee, Florida	Active	
**Alpha Beta**	July 9, 2011	Northeastern University	Boston, Massachusetts	Active	(Note: Started as an associate chapter on April 14, 2007.)
**Alpha Gamma**	May 21, 2005	Oregon State University	Corvallis, Oregon	Inactive	
**Alpha Delta**	2012	University of Tennessee	Knoxville, Tennessee	Active	
**Alpha Epsilon**	July 20, 2017	University of Illinois at Urbana–Champaign	Champaign, Illinois	Active	
Alpha Zeta	2018 – 202x ?	University of Pittsburgh	Pittsburgh, Pennsylvania	Inactive	
Alpha Eta	2018	University of Massachusetts-Lowell	Lowell, Massachusetts	Inactive	
**Alpha Theta**	August 17, 2018	University of North Florida	Jacksonville, Florida	Active	
**Alpha Iota**	201x ?	New Jersey Institute of Technology	Newark, New Jersey	Active	
**Alpha Kappa**	201x ?	Rutgers University–Newark	Newark, New Jersey	Active	
**Alpha Lambda**	2019	Emory University	Atlanta, Georgia	Active	
Alpha Mu	20xx ? – 202x ?	Stockton University	Galloway, New Jersey	Inactive	
**Alpha Nu**	20xx ?	Syracuse University	Syracuse, New York	Active	
**Alpha Xi**	2017	Rowan University	Glassboro, New Jersey	Active	
		Boston University	Boston, Massachusetts	Colony	(Note: Colony formed in April 23, 2005.)
		Indiana University Bloomington	Bloomington, Indiana	Associate	(Note: Associate chapter formed on May 29, 2010.)
		Kennesaw State University	Cobb County, Georgia	Colony	(Note: Colony formed in 2020.)
		Long Island University	Brooklyn, New York	Colony	(Note: Chapter formed on December 1, 2008.)
		Michigan State University	East Lansing, Michigan	Colony	(Note: Colony formed in December 10, 2006.)
		University at Albany, SUNY	Albany, New York	Colony	(Note: Colony formed on April 20, 2012.)
		University at Buffalo	Buffalo, New York	Colony	(Note: Colony formed on December 7, 2001)
		University of Michigan	Ann Arbor, Michigan	Colony	(Note: Colony formed on December 6, 2013.)
		Wayne State University	Detroit, Michigan	Associate	(Note: Associated chapter established on December 13, 2014.)

== See also ==
- List of social fraternities and sororities
- National APIDA Panhellenic Association
- List of Asian American fraternities and sororities
- Cultural interest fraternities and sororities
