= Alpha Kappa Delta Phi =

American Asian-interest college sorority

alpha Kappa Delta Phi
- αΚΔΦ
- Founded: February 7, 1990; 36 years ago University of California, Berkeley
- Type: Social
- Affiliation: NAPA
- Status: Active
- Scope: North America
- Motto: "Timeless Friendship Through Sisterhood'
- Colors: Purple and White
- Symbol: Hourglass
- Flower: Iris
- Jewel: Diamond
- Mascot: Phoenix
- Chapters: 69
- Headquarters: United States
- Website: www.akdphi.org

alpha Kappa Delta Phi (αΚΔΦ), also known as aKDPhi, Kappa Delta Phi, KDPhi, is an international Asian-interest sorority founded at the University of California, Berkeley. alpha Kappa Delta Phi has established 69 chapters at numerous universities across the United States and in Canada. It is part of the National APIDA Panhellenic Association (NAPA), which it helped charter in 2006.

== History ==
alpha Kappa Delta Phi was established at the University of California, Berkeley in the Fall of 1989 and recognized by the College Panhellenic Association on February 7, 1990. There were fourteen founding sisters, including Betty Chu, Karin Co, Susan Kim, Nancy Lee, Sherri Leung, Annie Loo, Belinda Ma, Anita Ng, Serene Ngin, Fannie Pon, Josie Sun, Daisy Wu, Jill Yoshimura, and Reina Yuan.

The founders dedicated themselves "to establishing a sorority which would offer Asian American women the opportunity to participate in the Greek system while also establishing an organization which would last as a strong tradition."

During the fall of 2002, the National Alumnae Board was established under the guidance of Sophia Yen to oversee the expansion and growth of the sorority's alumnae. The 2002–2003 National Alumnae Board wanted to create a working organization that would provide programs and services to all alumnae, resulting in the National Alumnae Association. The National Alumnae Board's initial activity focused on creating a mentoring program, followed by a scholarship program that would award financial aid to sisters looking to further their education.

== Symbols ==
alpha Kappa Delta Phi uses four Greek letters in its name and chooses not to capitalize the first letter or Alpha. Thus, in Greek, its letters are written: αΚΔΦ.

The sorority's official symbol is the hourglass. A candle features prominently on its crest. Its colors are Compassion Purple and White. Its stone is the diamond and its flower is the iris. The sorority's mascot is the Phoenix.

== Activities ==
alpha Kappa Delta Phi promotes Asian Awareness by encouraging its members to be constantly aware of and involved in Asian American issues in their communities. Chapters host events such as forums, presentations, workshops, and celebrations of Asian Pacific American Heritage Month.

== Philanthropy ==
alpha Kappa Delta Phi's national philanthropy is breast cancer awareness. The sorority's breast cancer awareness campaign began in 1998, and its exclusive partnership with Avon began in 2010 and ended in 2017. Across all chapters, the sorority hosts various events to raise awareness and fundraise towards this initiative, including but not limited to breast cancer awareness banquets, information sessions, workshops, and discussion groups. In 2016, the sorority raised and donated over $102,000, hitting the half-a-million mark in terms of the total dollar amount donated to the Avon Breast Cancer Crusade since the start of their partnership in 2010.

== Foundation ==
The aKDPhi Foundation, also known as The Foundation, was chartered in 2011 by the alpha Kappa Delta Phi Board of Directors with a focus on supporting educational, leadership, and philanthropic development. The Foundation was formally recognized in 2013 as a 501(c)(3) public charity by the Internal Revenue Service and is considered a separate entity from alpha Kappa Delta Phi International Sorority, Inc. Today, the foundation has expanded its mission to focus on women's empowerment and through fundraising efforts, grant programs, programming, and scholarship initiatives. Its ultimate vision is a world where women of all backgrounds have equal access to personal & professional development and physical & mental health resources.

== Chapters ==
alpha Kappa Delta Phi has 67 chapters across three classes. Full-fledged chapters have met all the requirements for the sorority's chapter advancement process and have been installed. Associate chapters and pre-associate chapters meet some of the requirements for installation but are still developing.

== See also ==
- List of Asian American fraternities and sororities
- List of social sororities and women's fraternities
- Cultural interest fraternities and sororities
