= Lambda Phi Epsilon =

North American Asian-American-Interest collegiate fraternity

- ΛΦΕ
- Founded: February 25, 1981; 45 years ago UCLA
- Type: Social
- Affiliation: NAPA
- Former affiliation: NIC
- Status: Active
- Emphasis: Asian American
- Scope: International
- Motto: ΗΓΕΜΟΝΕΣ ΕΝ ΑΝΘΡΩΠΟΙΣ ΕΙΝΑΙ "Leaders Among Men"
- Colors: Royal Blue and White
- Mascot: Dragon
- Philanthropy: National Marrow Donor Program
- Chapters: 68 active
- Members: 10,000 lifetime
- Nicknames: LPhiE, LFE, 人中王
- Headquarters: Los Angeles, California; United States
- Website: www.lambdaphiepsilon.org

Lambda Phi Epsilon (ΛΦΕ, also known as LPhiE and LFE) is the largest Asian-American-Interest fraternity in North America. Lambda Phi Epsilon is affiliated with the National APIDA Panhellenic Association, and is a former member of the North American Interfraternity Conference.

== History ==
Lambda Phi Epsilon was formed on February 25, 1981, at the University of California, Los Angeles. Noting that Asian fraternities and sororities at the University of California campuses were recognized only as service organizations due to their membership's focus on specific Asian groups and exclusion of other ethnic groups, the founders aimed to create a fraternity that transcends the traditional boundaries of national origins, bridges the gaps between those communities, and is recognized by the Greek-letter community at large.

Lambda Phi Epsilon's vision is to be the preeminent international Asian interest fraternal organization, and to provide leadership, philanthropy, and advocacy in the community. While the original charter focused on Asian Pacific Americans, people from all ethnic backgrounds were welcome to join. Craig Ishigo and Darryl Mu signed the charter as president and vice president.

Within a few years, the fraternity had chartered to the University of Texas, Austin (Zeta chapter), the State University of New York, Buffalo (Nu chapter), and the University of Michigan (Xi chapter). In 1990, the organization was recognized by the North American Interfraternity Conference, being the first Asian Interest fraternity to do so. State University of New York, Buffalo (Nu chapter) was Lambda Phi Epsilon's first chapter to be chartered on the American East Coast.

Starting as Delta Gamma Tau, on September 15, 1992, this fraternity merged with Lambda Phi Epsilon (effectively taking on Lambda Phi Epsilon's letters) to unify organizations with identical purposes and to strengthen the Asian American voice in the campus community. On December 5, 2004, Lambda Phi Epsilon established a colony at the University of Toronto (Alpha Xi chapter), which was the first chapter of the fraternity established outside the United States.

== Symbols ==
Lambda Phi Epsilon's motto is ΗΓΕΜΟΝΕΣ ΕΝ ΑΝΘΡΩΠΟΙΣ ΕΙΝΑΙ or "Leaders Among Men". Its colors are royal blue and white.

== Activities ==
Lambda Phi Epsilon currently awards three merit-based scholarships to active brothers in good standing who have been chosen from a pool of applicants. The Rising Leaders Among Men Scholarship recognizes first-year members, The Academic Excellence Scholarship recognizes academic achievement, and The Lambda of the Year Scholarship recognizes students who epitomize the organization's mission statement.

Lambda Phi Epsilon holds an annual convention during Memorial Day weekend at various locations across North America, co-hosted with the sisters of alpha Kappa Delta Phi. Throughout the weekend, members have the opportunity to learn about the state of the fraternity as addressed by the National Board, network with alumni in career-oriented workshops, and socialize with fellow actives from around the world. Convention ends with an annual banquet that recognizes incoming and outgoing fraternal leadership, announces chapter promotions and awards, and showcases brotherhood step performances and other perpetuating traditions of the fraternity.

== Philanthropy ==
The fraternity's national philanthropy works to raise awareness for bone marrow drives. For patients with leukemia or any other blood disorder, the best chance of finding a matching donor lies within their own ethnic community. Asian donors comprise a small fraction (7% as of January 2013) of the National Marrow Donor Program (NMDP). Because of this, every chapter of Lambda Phi Epsilon hosts several bone marrow drives in conjunction with organizations like the Asian American Donor Program, Asians for Miracle Marrow Matches, and the former Cammy Lee Leukemia Foundation to inform, educate, and recruit potential marrow donors for the NMDP. Lambda Phi Epsilon recognized bone marrow drives as the national philanthropy when Evan Chen, a member from Stanford University, was diagnosed with leukemia in 1995. The fraternity organized a campus-wide movement to find a bone marrow match for Chen. What resulted was the largest bone marrow typing drive in the history of the NMDP and AADP (Asian American Donor Program). In a matter of days, over 2,000 people were typed. A match was eventually found for Chen, but by that time, the cancer had taken its toll and he died 1996. Since then, the fraternity organizes annual bone marrow drives to help others find matching donors. Collectively, chapters of Lambda Phi Epsilon amass hundreds of new registrants every year in national campaigns like Save Janet Liang and Save Nina Louie.

== Chapters ==
Lambda Phi Epsilon has a total of 78 chapters in 6 geographic regions.

West Coast

- California (13)
- Washington (2)

Southwest

- Texas (5)
- Oklahoma (2)
- Arizona (1)

Midwest

- Illinois (5)
- Indiana (2)
- Kansas (1)
- Michigan (2)
- Nebraska (1)
- Wisconsin (2)
- Ohio (1)

North East

- Connecticut (1)
- Massachusetts (3)
- New York (6)
- Ontario, Canada (2)

Mid-Atlantic

- Maryland (3)
- New Jersey (1)
- New York (5)
- Pennsylvania (4)

South East

- Florida (3)
- Georgia (1)
- North Carolina (4)
- Virginia (5)
- Tennessee (2)

== Notable members ==
- Yul Kwon – Winner of Survivor: Cook Islands and named one of People magazine's Sexiest Men for 2006. Served as deputy chief of the Federal Communications Commission's Consumer and Governmental Affairs Bureau. Host of PBS show called America Revealed.

== Member and chapter misconduct ==
=== Hazing ===
Lambda Phi Epsilon has experienced the most hazing incidents among Asian-American fraternities, including three deaths. All deaths occurred in the last 13 years. As of 2019, eighteen chapters have been closed. Hazing activities include (but are not limited to) knuckle push-ups, consumption of large amounts of alcohol and miscellaneous condiments, tackle football, and calisthenics.

In 2005, two pledges at separate universities died in hazing incidents. In August of that year, UC Irvine student Kenny Luong died after being tackled in a football game that pitted a 10-member pledge group against approximately 40 active members and alumni. The game lasted for more than 3 hours and was played without the use of pads. Prior to the football game, the pledges were forced to complete vigorous calisthenics such as close-fisted push-ups on gravel; jumping in the air while standing, landing on their chests without using their hands to break their fall; and drinking two gallons of water in one sitting. The chapter was officially shut down by UC Irvine in 2007.

In December 2005, Jack Phoummarath, an 18-year-old at the University of Texas, died from alcohol poisoning in what was described by his family as a hazing incident. Three former leaders of the chapter pleaded no contest. A settlement was reached with the fraternity for $4.2 million. The fraternity organization did not have insurance, and was unable to pay the entire settlement. The fraternity later established the Jack Phoummarath Memorial Scholarship in his honor.

In 2008, The Daily Northwestern, the newspaper of Northwestern University, published an article revealing hazing violations as part of the chapter's pledging process. Pledges were forced to drink jugs of liquid believed to be a mixture of ketchup and Tabasco sauce and perform calisthenics all night. After an official university hearing, Lambda Phi Epsilon received a four-year suspension from Northwestern.

In 2013, another fraternity member died at San Francisco State University. Eighteen-year-old Peter Tran died due to alcohol poisoning during a "crossing" event at the house. The university later expelled Lambda Phi Epsilon from the campus following a full review.

In 2018, Bwog, a Columbia University news blog, received a detailed report about the initiation process of the Alpha Rho chapter at Columbia University. Bwog reported that, "In the last week of the pledging process, the Columbia pledges were taken to the University of Pennsylvania's chapter. There, they were made to compete with the Penn Lambda pledges in physical activities, including push-ups and high knees. The exertion was so extreme that our source recounts passing out and being doused with ice water to forcibly awaken him." On Friday December 21, 2018, the Sigma chapter at the University of Pennsylvania in Philadelphia was voted to be shut down by the Board of Directors due to "significance evidence of hazing being practiced as part of the new member education process." The chapter has been suspended indefinitely.

In 2018, Cal Poly's investigation took place in regards to systemic hazing of new pledges in recent years."The university received anonymous reports that members of the chapter had taken part in the hazing and began the investigation September 28." Ultimately, it was determined the fraternity was involved with multiple accounts of painful and unsafe hazing such as forcing pledges to perform knuckle push-ups and late-night submersion in the ocean. In addition, the chapter forced pledges to consume large amounts of alcohol and provided minors with access to alcohol. The accounts were supported by corroborating testimonies from both current and former members of the fraternity. "All anonymous sources said they were left with broken skin and bloodied knuckles. Some said they were left with scars." On Thursday, October 18, 2018, the chapter was officially suspended for a minimum of two academic years or until all the past members have graduated.

In June 2019, Pennsylvania State's Office of Student Conduct and Lambda Phi Epsilon International Fraternity, Inc., launched a joint investigation after receiving allegations of hazing during the new member education process. The recommendation for suspension came from the university. On June 17, the international organization revoked the fraternity's charter. Suspension of the Tau chapter at Pennsylvania State University results in losses of all privileges as a recognized student organization." The chapter has been suspended through 2023.

Michigan State University's chapter was sued by a former member for compensatory damages with regards to hazing that he alleged happened in fall of 2021. Connor Mui said that he was forced to consume "dangerous amounts of marijuana," which led to his hospitalization. Several days later, Mui alleged that he was required to perform calisthenics all night without sleep, following which he was hospitalized again and diagnosed with exertional rhabdomyolysis. He reported these incidents to MSU in December 2021, and the administration determined that "there was a preponderance of evidence to validate a violation of" school rules regarding hazing. The fraternity had its registered student organization status was on probation as recently as spring 2023.

=== Chapter suspensions ===
In March 2016, the UC Santa Cruz chapter was suspended following the arrests of several members accused of running a drug smuggling ring. The alpha Kappa Delta Phi sorority was also suspended for the same reason.

On May 29, 2020, screenshots of the NYU chapter group chat surfaced showing members of the fraternity making statements saying "black peoples were lazy" and "it's only logical that police brutality is more common with those communities". These comments were in response to the George Floyd protests. Both the university and the fraternity suspended the chapter pending investigation. The incident prompted a push from New York activists to address racism among New York's Chinese community.

On November 1, 2022, the Purdue chapter was suspended after investigations following allegations of hazing, sexual assault and relationship violence, academic dishonesty and underground functions. The results of the investigation prompted the Purdue chapter of alpha Kappa Delta Phi to end official relations with the fraternity

== See also ==
- List of social fraternities and sororities
- Cultural-interest fraternities and sororities
- List of Asian American fraternities and sororities
