= Alpha Delta Theta =

Alpha Delta Theta (ΑΔΘ) may refer to:

- Alpha Delta Theta (professional), a medical technology sorority
- Alpha Delta Theta (social), a defuct social sorority
