= University of Minnesota fraternities and sororities =

The list of University of Minnesota fraternities and sororities is extensive. Approximately eleven percent of undergraduates, 3,400 students, participate in one of the sixty chapters of social fraternities or sororities at the University of Minnesota, Twin Cities campus. Participation in affiliated groups such as honor, service, and professional fraternities bring total Greek letter affiliation figures significantly higher. Counting past and present, more than half of the university's 200 Greek letter organizations remain active today, the pioneers of which have had a presence on the University of Minnesota campus for over 150 years. The university's Greek letter organizations includes professional fraternities, honor societies, service fraternities, and religious fraternities along with the highly visible residential undergrad academic and social chapters.

A comprehensive list of chapters, past and present, segmented by category, follows this brief overview of what these societies are and how they evolved. References for each group show current and former property addresses, either owned or leased. Contact information is provided via the references, where available.

== Historical sketch ==
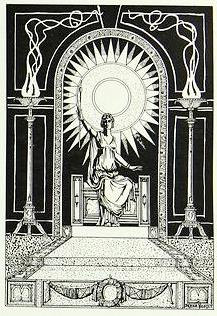
Editors of the Minnesota Gopher yearbook created iconic etchings to highlight fraternity and sorority pages, this example from 1922.

The University of Minnesota fraternity and sorority system, which in vernacular is sometimes called its "Greek system", is over 150 years old, having grown steadily with the rapid growth of the university. Its first men's fraternity, Chi Psi, dates to 1874, and its first women's fraternity, Kappa Kappa Gamma, dates to 1880, long before the term 'sorority' was popularized as a term for the women's 'houses'. (Note: As a topic of discussion, "fraternity", "sorority" or "society" seem preferable, shortened to either "Fraternity system" or "Greek system" or even "the Greeks" in common usage. The terms "society" or "organization" as a more generic substitute is also common.)

Yet these pioneer chapters did not themselves mark the beginnings of a fraternal presence at the school. Many of Minnesota's early university presidents and department heads were fraternity men or women from 'back East,' having experienced undergraduate life in the flourishing literary societies and old-line fraternities (Note: Here, "old line" means that they were founded nationally before the American Civil War.) that in turn were born out of America's earliest institutions of higher learning. These include William Watts Folwell, the university's first president, who was a member of Alpha Delta Phi at Hobart College, Cyrus Northrop, who was both an Alpha Sigma Phi AND a member of Delta Kappa Epsilon at Yale, Ada Comstock, Dean of Women, and a member of Delta Gamma at Minnesota, president George Vincent who was also a member of Delta Kappa Epsilon at Yale, and president James Morrill who was also an Alpha Sigma Phi, at Ohio State.

Still, because the University of Minnesota has one of the oldest fraternity systems in the nation, many of the university's fraternity and sorority chapters are among the oldest of their respective organizations and often have single-letter or first-series chapter names or designations. Similarly, the age, prestige, size, and breadth of the University of Minnesota have resulted in its hosting many of the nation's honor and professional fraternities for most disciplines. As early as 1925, the Minnesota Gopher yearbook reported the presence of 25 national academic fraternities, eighteen national academic sororities, and 33 national professional chapters on campus. Most of these, undergrad or professional, are (or were) residential.

In 2017, the university had 37 academic fraternities, 23 academic sororities, 61 honors societies, 31 professional societies, and four service- or religious-focused chapters.

== Impact on campus, and population ==
Since its inception, these organizations have delivered an outsized influence and benefit to the campus: The first indicator of this impact is the fact of hundreds of pages devoted to the myriad of Greek Letter organizations profiled in each issue of the Minnesota Gopher yearbook during its century-long publication run. These organizations have served as a primary hub of the student experience at the university for their entire existence, for active members, regular guests, and alumni.

The high watermark for fraternity and sorority participation by percentage, indicated by a review of senior photos and club membership, was from 1910 through 1920 when approximately 1/4 of undergraduates participated in one or more of the academic or professional societies. (Note: See any Minnesota Gopher yearbook during this decade, which lists the names of senior class members and the clubs to which they belonged.) The peak number of residential chapters came at approximately 75 in 1930. While membership continued to expand into the 1930s, the membership percentage decreased as the Minnesota campus grew less residential. Through this period, interest in fraternity and sorority membership was not as strong among commuters, 'night class,' and non-traditional students. The Membership percentage of the overall undergraduate population reached a low point of 3% in the late 1960s. Later, an upturn resulted in a numeric peak that came during the early 1980s: In 1981, the Office of Fraternity and Sorority Life reported 3,100 net members, while 3,964 participated in 1984. In a spike downturn coinciding with the economic recession of that era, participation hit a marked numeric low point in about 2005, but recovered to 1,795 active members by 2011. Still expanding, by mid-2014, participation included approximately 2,800 net undergraduate members, as reported in June of that year, reflecting about 8% of the undergraduate population and about 12% of 2013–14's incoming freshmen class. Noteworthy membership gains continue: by 2017, participation had increased to 3,400, or fully 11% of the campus undergraduate population, even before adding students to the professional chapters. A new high point was reached in the fall of 2019, with 3,576 participants, or 12% of the student population. Since 2019, due mainly to the COVID pandemic, membership has declined somewhat, with Fall 2022 participation including 2,530 students, or 7% of the undergraduate student population. This number does not include professional or graduate student involvement. Fifty-eight campus chapters were residential as of 2017. (Note: This number includes both Minneapolis and St. Paul collegiate chapter housing, counting residential academic and social fraternities and sororities, the Evans Scholars honor society, residential professional societies, and ΚΠΑ religious service society. Several chapters maintain two buildings.)

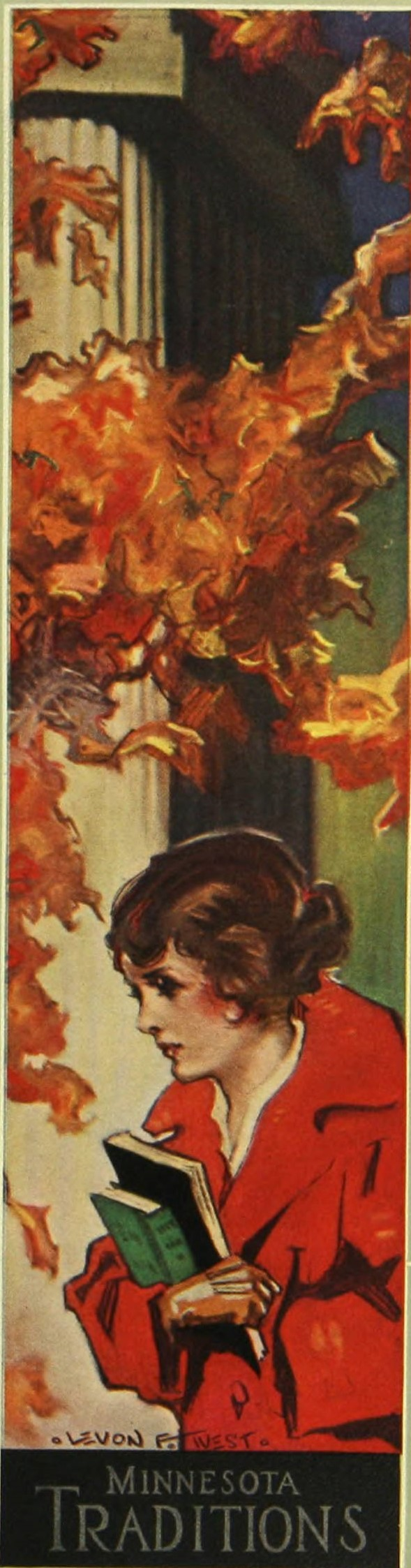
Detail from the 1922 Minnesota Gopher yearbook

== Traditions ==
For over a century, the university's fraternities and sororities provided the backbone of campus support for traditions such as Homecoming and Campus Carnival, which events, along with Greek Week, almost immediately sparked a procession of annual competitions between chapters for best decor, musical talent, cheer, theater, and dance. Athletic teams, where fraternity and sorority members were predominant among both varsity and club sports, similarly were knit into the campus life of previous decades, offering the university twin fountains of school spirit.

=== Homecoming ===
The longest-running collegiate football "trophy game" rivalry (Note: The Little Brown Jug is the oldest shared trophy. However, the oldest rivalry, in terms of games played is the Minnesota vs. Wisconsin series.) in the United States is the University of Minnesota's enduring series of battles against the University of Michigan, whose Little Brown Jug was first captured by Minnesota in 1903. Building from the excitement of that memorable game, Minnesota's Homecoming tradition, an opportunity for alumni to gather at their Alma Mater, began in 1914 with a game against Wisconsin and a Homecoming Dance. By 1919, Greeks had organized a parade to mark the day, with fraternities, sororities, academic departments, and dorms all vying for the best-decorated float. The Minnesota Gopher yearbook of 1922 remarks in a retrospective of the 1919 event that "all University buildings, as well as the fraternities and sororities, were decorated in Minnesota and Michigan colors." This tradition has persisted and grown for over 100 years.

Four ΣΧ All-Americans in 1929: l to r: Joesting, Gibson, Martineau and Nagurski

=== Sports ===
Varsity and interfraternal sports were intertwined in the first half of the 20th century. Early campus sporting legends were often members of campus fraternities. The most notable example is Sigma Chi's Bronko Nagurski, a standout football All-American in 1929 who played for Minnesota from 1927 to 1929. He was named to the College Football Hall of Fame in its inaugural year of 1951. Pledging during the Fall of 1927, Nagurski participated in the rowdy social scene, endless buffet dinners, and the arduous pledge process that would later be outlined by his biographer, Jim Dent. His experience was similar to other members in an era where Hell week was a requirement regardless of social or athletic status. Ninety years later, Nagurski's jersey and photo are still enshrined at the fraternity house where he remains as revered today as he was during his collegiate career. Another example is Phi Sigma Kappa's Bert Baston, likewise a standout All-American in both the 1915 and 1916 seasons. Baston later served as the Varsity Gophers' Ends Coach from 1930 to 1941, and again from 1946 to 1950, and was named to the College Football Hall of Fame in 1954. (Note: WWI service ended, for Baston, his options for a career playing football professionally; upon recuperating from WWI injuries he was already a war hero as he started his coaching career: Baston had been awarded the Navy Cross, cited for Extraordinary Heroism from his actions in WWI at Belleau Woods. He was a Marine Captain of the Devil Dogs.) Alpha Delta Phi's Bernie Bierman was Head Coach at Minnesota from 1932 to 1950, likewise with a 4-year break for WWII service. He and Baston powered their 1915 team to a national championship as undergrads. Later, as head coach, Bierman went on to win five national championships and was elected to the College Football Hall of Fame in 1955. Bud Grant, long-time coach of the Minnesota Vikings, was a three-sport, nine-letter athlete at Minnesota and a member of Phi Delta Theta, later elected to the Pro Football Hall of Fame. Sigma Chi served up three more All-Americans: Herb Joesting, a full back, elected to the 'Hall in 1954, All-American in 1926–27 and a chapter contemporary of Nagurski; George Gibson, fellow namesake of the Gibson-Nagurski football complex, selected as an All-American in 1928; and Earl Martineau, selected as an All-American in 1922 and 1923. Thus, a single chapter had four All-Americans (two Hall of Famers) within seven years, close enough for the four to be photographed, dressed for practice (pictured). A sixth campus All-American was Phi Delta Theta's Dick Wildung, 1942 team captain, NFL first-round draftee to the Packers, and yet another inductee into the College Football Hall of Fame, elected in 1957. Several decades later, another chapter boasted three outstanding Hall of Fame athletes at the same time: Carl Eller, Vikings legend, was a U of MN standout from 1959 to 1962, Bobby Bell was twice elected All-American, playing from 1960 to 1962, and Sandy Stephens, playing from 1959 to 1961, was named an All-American quarterback. All three were members of Alpha Phi Alpha. In all, 14 of 19 Gopher players who have been named to the College Football Hall of Fame as of 2021 have been members of campus fraternities. (Note: Other notable Greek football players from Minnesota elected to the College Football Hall of Fame include George Franck, who was a member of Phi Delta Theta, playing from 1938 to 1940, and elected in 2002. His team won a national championship in his senior year. Franck later went on to play for the NFL's Giants. Paul Giel was a member of Phi Kappa, which later merged into Phi Kappa Theta, playing from 1951 to 1953, and being inducted into the Hall of Fame in 1975. Coach Lou Holtz, elected to the College Football Hall of Fame in 2008, had been a member of Delta Upsilon at Kent State University. John McGovern was a member of Alpha Tau Omega, playing from 1908 to 1910, and was elected to the Hall of Fame in 1966. Leo Nomellini was a member of Delta Chi, playing from 1946 to 1949, and was elected in 1977. Eddie Rogers was a member of the law fraternity Phi Delta Phi, playing from 1900 to 1903, with election to the Hall of Fame in 1968. He was also named to the American Indian Athletic Hall of Fame in 1973. Finally, Ed Widseth was a member of FarmHouse fraternity who played from 1934 to 1936, and was elected to the Hall of Fame in 1954. He was an All-American and played for the NFL Giants. This reference, and the text of the main page – along with Bud Grant – lists just members of the College Football Hall of Fame from Minnesota who were Greeks; many other varsity football players were fraternal men. Similarly, nationally recognized athletes of other varsity sports were fraternity and sorority members.)

Fraternities often featured those "big men on campus" in their recruitment materials, particularly those letterman for their respective athletic teams.

Several sports were popularized through early fraternity support. Whereas football, basketball, and track were named early varsity sports with the more robust funding that the name implies, others, like tennis, wrestling, and gymnastics, were tagged as "minor sports." Hockey fit into a middle ground. The sport was played throughout the region as a club sport in the 1900s and 1910s, with ad-hoc teams named to represent the university on outdoor rinks as early as 1903 and again in 1910. Rivals included the University of Chicago and the University of Wisconsin. Interest steadily grew, along with inklings of future conference play. By 1920, some twenty teams fielded by the fraternities vied in what Gopher editorials deemed the "fierce competition for the league championship." The stars of this fraternity league, including Phi Sigma Kappa's Merle DeForrest, Paul Swanson, and Frank Pond, and Delta Tau Delta's Chester Bros, were named to a team to represent the university. That year, DeForrest organized a petition drive that resulted in permanent funding by the Regents, awarding the hockey team its long-sought varsity status. Soon after, former captain Frank Pond was named as Varsity Hockey's third head coach (1930–35). Today, the team's Rookie of the Year award is named after Pond. (Note: According to Phi Sigma Kappa historical records, Pond was often quoted as saying that their [DeForrest, Swanson, Bros and Pond's] actions resulted in the Regents' decision to grant varsity status to the hockey team a full five years before it would naturally have occurred.)

The first-ever crew racing competition was organized on May 13, 1926, by another Phi Sigma Kappa athlete, Owen "Sox" Whiteside '29, who had won an international juniors championship in the Northwest International Regatta the year prior. (Note: Whiteside had competed in the Duluth summer league under legendary coach James (Dad) Ten Eyck of Syracuse, who visited Duluth that year with Chuck Whiteside, Sox' uncle, who was coach of the Harvard Crew. At the University, Whiteside organized four-man teams from senior honor societies, the Iron Wedge and Grey Friars, in a competition on Cap and Gown Day, aimed to foster rowing. Later, he went on to coach the Minneapolis Rowing Club and Lake Calhoun Rowing Club for four decades, where his teams won the Lipton Cup at the International championships in 1950 and 1951. Sox served as a promoter of his sport and national secretary of the Northwestern International Rowing Association (NWIRA) until 1970. The NWIRA Senior Lightweight Doubles trophy is named after him.) It appeared obvious to Minnesota Daily and Gopher yearbook writers that proximity to a mild stretch of the Mississippi River made it natural that the university should have a premier crew team. The first-ever rowing competition at Minnesota was held that year, pitting honors societies the Iron Wedge and the Grey Friars against each other with borrowed four-man shells in an attempt to jump-start the sport. Several races followed over the next decade, but the downturn of the Great Depression cooled interest and funding, which only returned to its previous level after WWII with the establishment of a men's rowing club team in 1957, and a women's varsity team in 2000.

Athletes continued to wear fraternity letters well into the 1980s until risk-averse coaches began to limit such fraternity participation within major sports. Greeks may still be found among non-revenue teams, as club sports participants, and within intramurals.

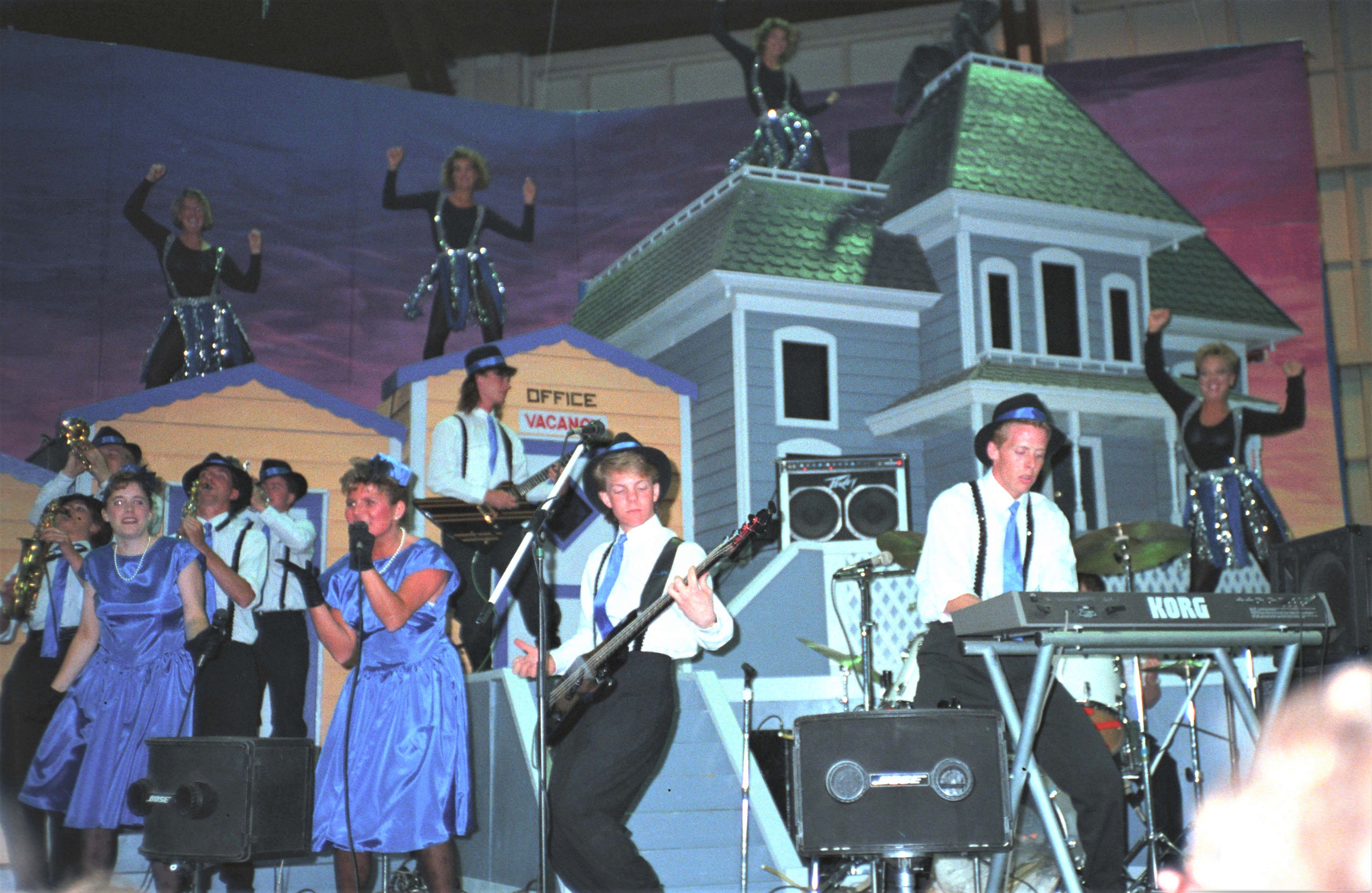
Phi Sigma Kappa and Alpha Chi Omega paired for 1987's winning entry, "Hitchcock," shown here in mid-song.

=== Campus Carnival and Greek Week ===
Where Homecoming was the premier event for the Fall Quarter, at the University of Minnesota, Greek Week or the more recent Machy Days has provided a focus for Greek competition during the Winter Quarter. Yet it was the venerable Campus Carnival that held sway during the early Spring for over seven decades running. "Carni" grew from a small penny carnival established in 1914 to a massive, blaring fundraiser that rivaled any other campus in dollars raised for children's charities. Gamma Phi Beta sorority was the first sponsor, challenging the other sororities to decorate small booths. Three years later the Women's Athletic Association (WAA) took the lead, presiding over an event in the Women's Gym that was billed as a sort of miniature Mardi Gras; a swimmer's exhibition had the ladies smeared with phosphorus before diving into the pool, and in 1931 they debuted women's fencing as one of several athletic exhibitions. But it was the competitive 'hawking' of items for sale or challenge games from which evolved the ballyhoo dance lines and show ticket barkers of later years. From this event, the WAA earned needed funds for women's sports equipment and operating expenses. Later, beginning in the 1940s, it was managed by a professional fraternity Alpha Kappa Psi, and finally, by an independent board of governors. After WWII, outgrowing the Women's Gym, the event took place in the Fieldhouse.

The event continued to grow and evolve. By the 1960s, fraternity and sorority pairings would design a 50' x 150' three-story set built upon scaffolding and decorated with painted flats, upon which a 10-person pick-up band would play, surrounded by a "ballyhoo" of a dozen sorority dancers. The 3-day event earned extensive coverage in the newspapers of the time, all similarly describing the scene: With the blare of a horn marking the time, the bands would play all at once, to entertain a crowd gathered in front. After eight minutes another horn would blast, and the crowd would surge into the bowels of the set to gather on bleachers where they would watch a 12-minute one-act play. Every half hour, the cycle would repeat. Fieldhouse entrance tickets, show admission fees, and concession proceeds would all be donated to charity. In its later years, Carni would grow to generate more than $250,000 annually over the three-day bash (equivalent to $748,376 in 2023). Carni finally ended in 1989, due to concerns over rapidly increasing insurance rates and the fundraiser's impact on grades.

On a smaller scale, Greek Week offered an opportunity to showcase athletic prowess on the intramural fields while musical and dance talent was celebrated on the stage of Northrop Auditorium, again, by pairings of fraternities and sororities. It was common through the late 1990s for a fraternity and sorority to pair for these events, Homecoming, Greek Week, and Carni, and not to join with multiple houses as is the practice today. About the year 2000, Greek Week ended but was replaced by an expansion of 'Machy Days, originally an event hosted by the Sigma Chi fraternity, adjusted to offer much the same array of events. Competitive fundraising and hands-on charity is common among fraternities both in Minnesota and nationally.

== Building Fraternity Row ==
Minnesota's fraternities and sororities built up their housing prospects in three distinct phases, according to the 2003 Minneapolis Historical Commission Study. Before 1900, most early chapters served their membership with rented private homes. Between 1900 and 1917, rentals gave way to properties built for the chapters, resulting in several iconic examples of Beaux-Arts, Georgian, and Classical styles. Finally, between 1921 and 1936, Minnesota's fraternity chapters engaged in that same popular building spree which was sweeping across other early private and land grant colleges and universities from New York to California. The result of this last phase was the often stately homes occupied by many Greek chapters today, upgrades from boarding house-style clapboard and stucco homes, to the many "Fraternity Row" mansions that are visible at Minnesota along University Avenue SE, on 4th and 5th Street SE, and the 10th Avenue "Sorority Row," all in Minneapolis. Similarly, the St. Paul campus is home to several stately chapter buildings, or chapterhouses, along Cleveland Avenue. It is a testament to the alumni of many of these chapters that their buildings survived, as so many were financed by the 1920s financial bubble, having endured weak membership eras during the Great Depression and then the twin turmoils of WWII and 1960s anti-establishment unrest. Past university yearbooks, now digitally available, often picture these buildings, some with addresses and photos or professionally crafted etchings. A final wave of chapter building, usually in the Modernist style, occurred during the period 1950 to 1973.

Greek societies also provide a visible link with the past. Residential Greek chapters have been cited as architectural gems, "projecting a positive image through architecture, and setting an architectural standard for more than a century." Important examples of period architecture include Tudor with half-timber, Georgian and Federal variants of the American Colonial style, Vienna secessionist, English Gothic, Elizabethan or Georgian, and more recently, International Modernist styles. While many of these buildings are significant, enough to warrant the City of Minneapolis declaring the area a Greek Letter Chapter House Historical District in 2003, a few examples should be noted:

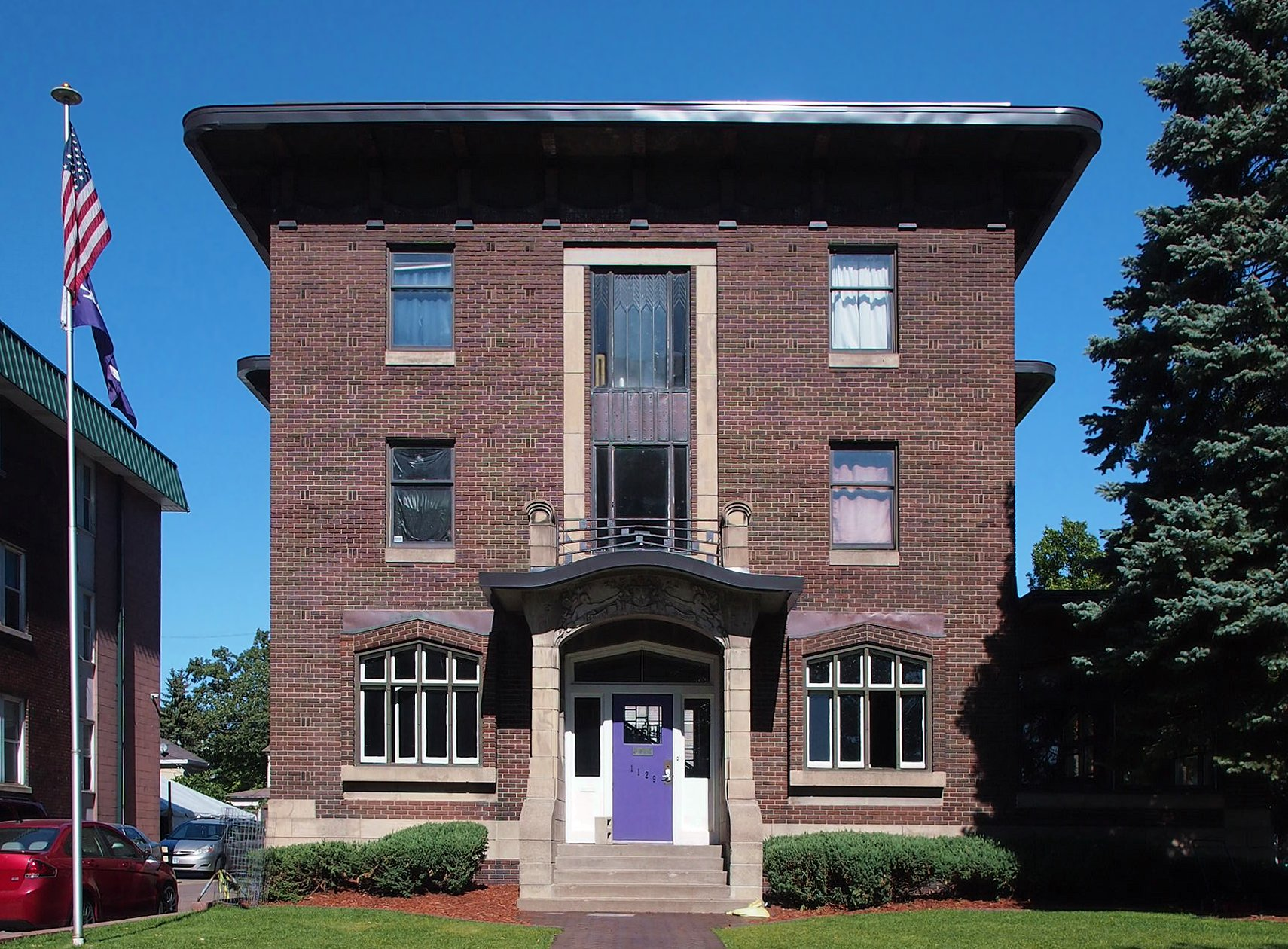
Fiji's Mu Sigma chapter (Vienna secessionist, an Arts and Crafts offshoot)

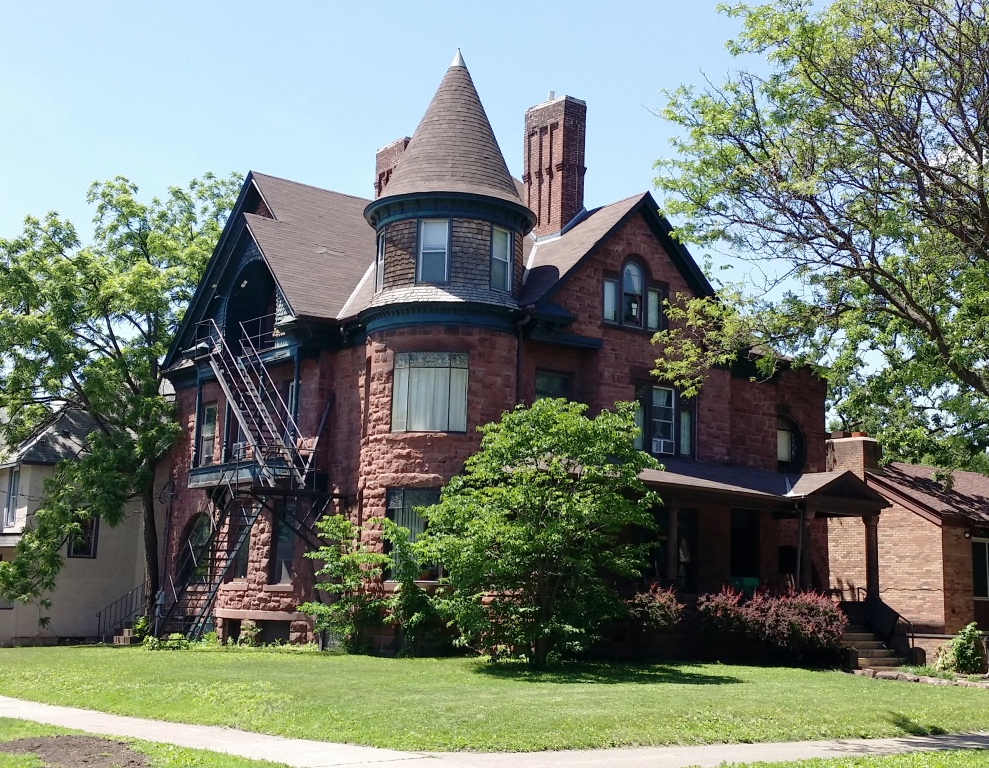
Gamma Eta Gamma ΓΗΓ's Minnesota chapter (Richardsonian Revival, elements of Queen Anne)

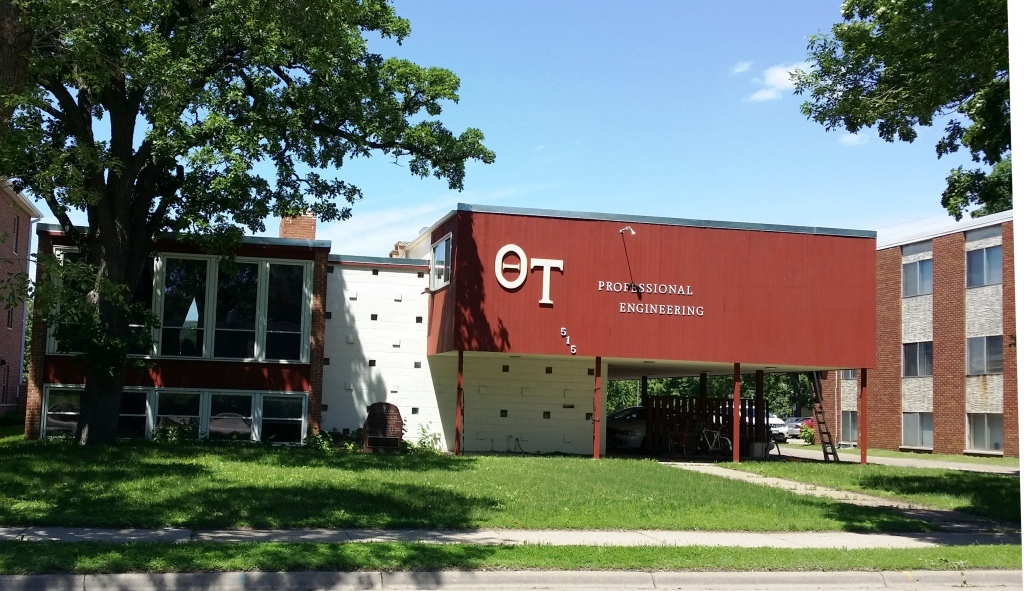
Theta Tau ΘΤ's Alpha chapter (International modernist style)

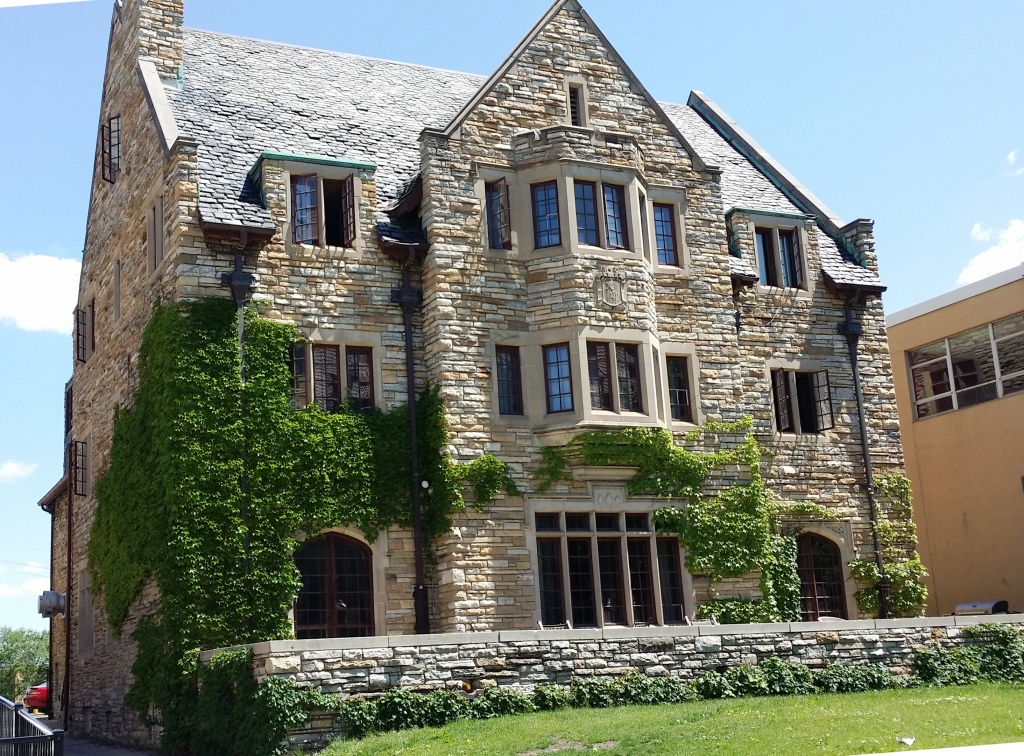
Chi Psi ΧΨ's Alpha Nu chapter (English Tudor)

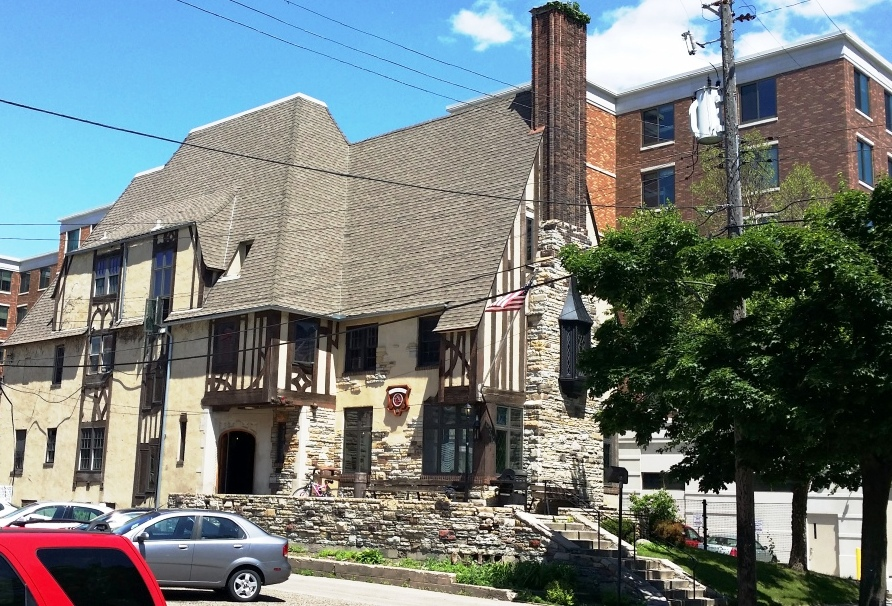
Phi Sigma Kappa ΦΣΚ's Beta Deuteron chapter (Elizabethan Revival)

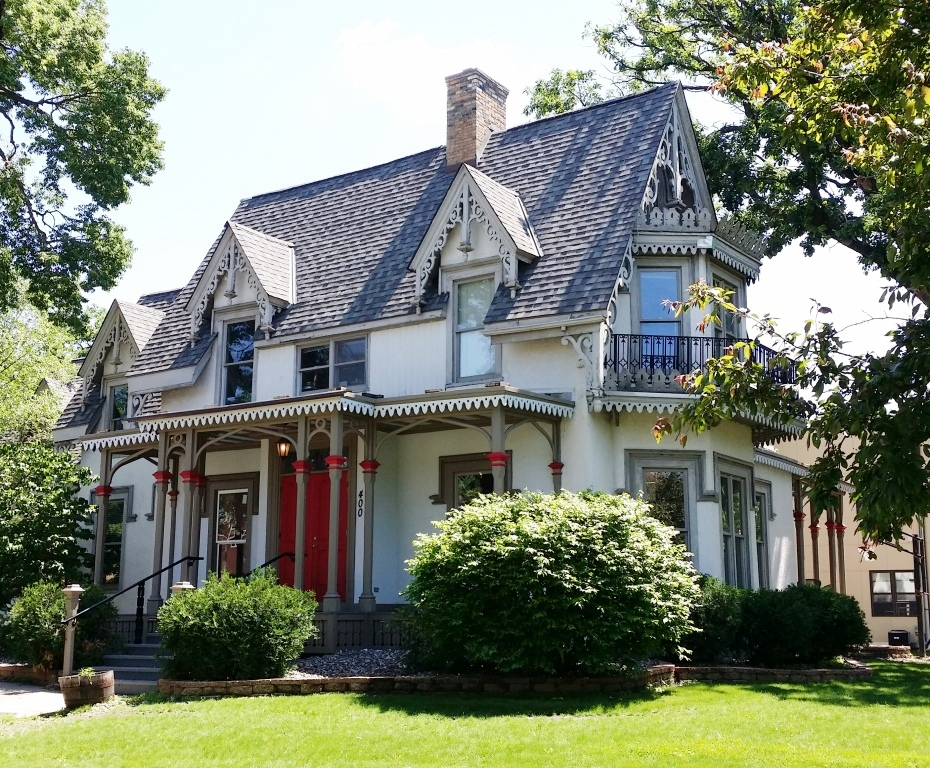
Sigma Phi Epsilon ΣΦΕ's Minnesota Alpha chapter (Carpenter Gothic)

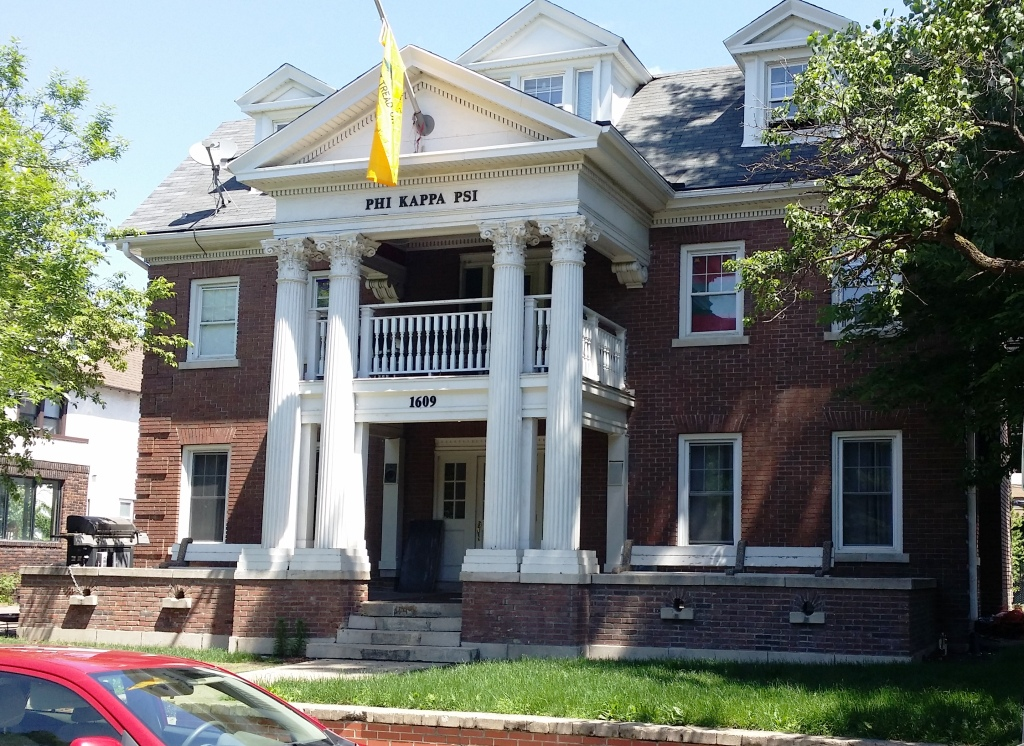
Phi Kappa Psi ΦΚΨ's Minnesota Beta chapter (Georgian and Greek Revival)

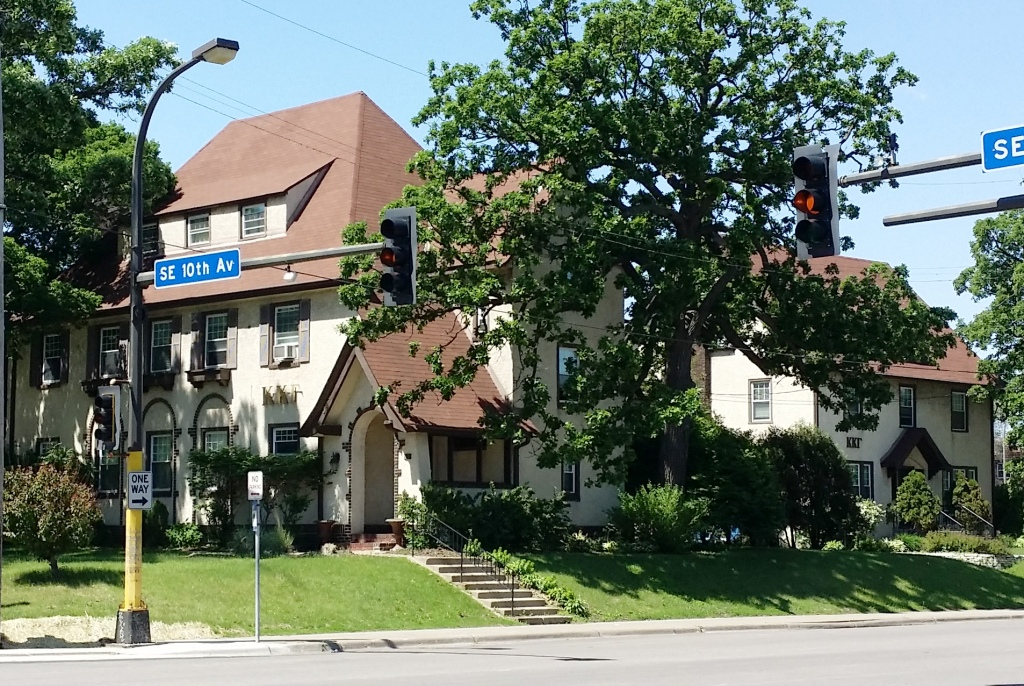
Kappa Kappa Gamma ΚΚΓ's Chi chapter (English Tudor, influenced by Arts and Crafts)
- Phi Gamma Delta (ΦΓΔ and Fiji) was one of the earliest-built Row mansions, exhibiting the Vienna secessionist style, an offshoot of the Arts and Crafts movement. (Note: Phi Gamma Delta maintains a policy for its members that limits the display of its Greek letters to a handful of approved usages, such as their official ring, chapter plaques, and memorial markers. However, Wikipedia is not bound by that rule, and for consistency with other pages has adjusted the entry to use Greek letters.)
- Gamma Eta Gamma (ΓΗΓ) law fraternity is a smaller example of Richardsonian Revival, perhaps with Queen Anne elements.
- Theta Tau (ΘΤ), an engineering fraternity, is an example of the International Modernist style.
- Chi Psi (ΧΨ) is an exceptional variant of an English Tudor country house, "built to convey masculine dignity and prestige."
- Phi Sigma Kappa (ΦΣΚ) is an Elizabethan-revival Tudor, noted as a "romantic-era masterpiece."
- Sigma Phi Epsilon (ΣΦΕ), built by B.O. Cutter and restored by Phi Delta Theta fraternity, this "gingerbread" home is a showcase of the Carpenter Gothic revival style. (Note: This building changed hands several times during the 1990s. It had been occupied by ΘΔΧ (Theta Delta Chi), a chapter that went dormant in 1984. Neighboring Phi Delt purchased the property and remodeled it extensively, but was unable to sell their previous home, an International Modernist building that has now been replaced by The Cluster. Due to the financial burden and other factors, Phi Delt closed ten years later. The restored B.O. Cutter building was purchased by Sigma Phi Epsilon, who had failed to purchase their historic home at 1617 University Avenue SE when that property was acquired by next-door Sigma Chi. These summary notes are from the previously referenced Zellie study.)
- Phi Kappa Psi (ΦΚΨ) combines elements of Georgian and Greek revival styles.
- Kappa Kappa Gamma (ΚΚΓ) offers a "dramatic and striking" mix of the English Tudor style, influenced by the Arts and Crafts movement popular at the time of its construction."

These and many other Minnesota chapterhouses exhibit exceptional elements of their architectural styles. The owners, often the same entities that built these homes, have maintained them despite age, sometimes hard use, and the financial strain of student organizations that can ebb and flow in popularity. Addresses may be found in the footnotes for these chapters, where they are listed below. Most style descriptions courtesy of the referenced Architecture Minnesota article.

Constrained somewhat by busy University Avenue and 4th Street, the expansion of Greek housing has been discussed at several points. The 2003 Zellie study, cited among the references, notes that there had been planned a "Fraternity Court" in the early 1920s. This stately road was to have been on the site where Williams Arena was later built, to host several new buildings between 19th Avenue and Oak Street. This plan conflicted with the university's development plan for the basketball arena though, and the Fraternity Court was not built, except the ΑΧΡ house that later was owned by ΧΦ, then leased by ΚΣ, and in fall 2016 bought by ΘΧ. In the 1960s, an early phase plan for a fraternity housing area on the river flats below the Washington Avenue Bridge was discussed. This plan did not materialize beyond the discussion stage.

=== Loss of original or long-term Greek properties ===
The late 1950s construction of Highway 35W resulted in the condemnation of multiple fraternity homes bordering what was 9th Avenue SE, many of which were sororities or professional fraternities. (Note: Highway 35W itself now follows the exact path of what was 9th Avenue SE through this neighborhood. It had run where the median between the north and southbound sides of the highway run today, from roughly 2nd Street SE to 8th Street SE, having absorbed the higher-numbered portion of the 800 blocks of the streets crossing it, and the lower-numbered addresses on the 900 blocks of these streets. For example, the previous building that stands where now ΑΧΩ is situated, at 915 University Ave. SE once had a tennis court extending on its property exactly where the highway frontage road and entrance/exit ramps now run. Researchers can infer the original street grid and view how the highway was situated with a Google Maps search.) In Stadium Village, several stately houses along Washington Avenue SE were lost to commercial development. More recently, restrictive zoning has both helped and harmed chapters, where economics of scale no longer allow viability without remodeling, expansion, or additional parking. Some chapters celebrate their buildings' local (or national) historic zone status, which has slowed the pace of demolition, is seen by others as a cost burden. Nevertheless, some chapter buildings have been lost to multi-unit development or have been sold to non-Greek buyers. A few examples of still-existing former Greek properties should be noted. Market forces may allow some of these to become available to Greek ownership again:

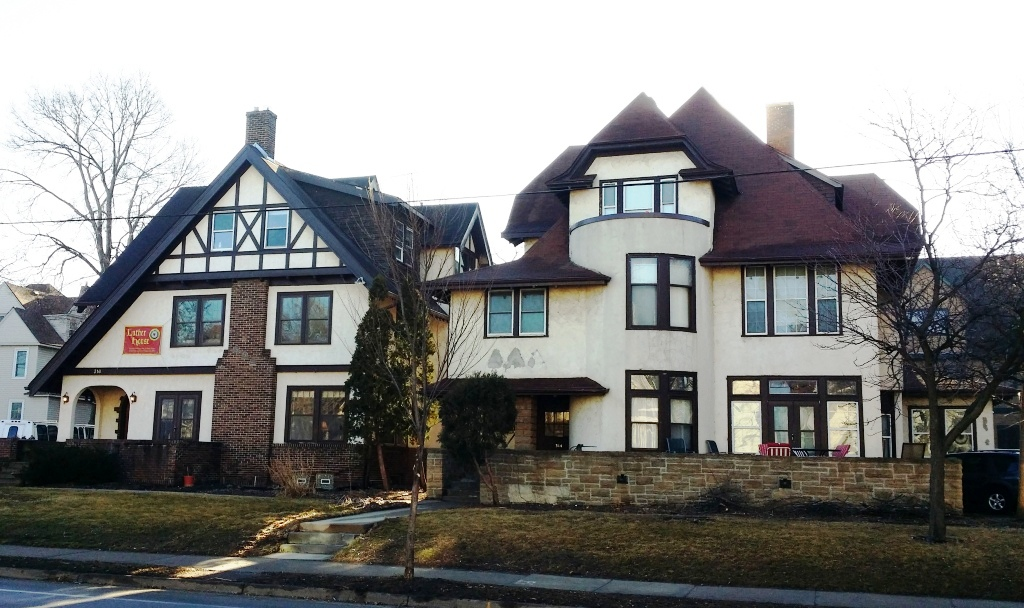
Former home of Delta Delta Delta's Theta chapter in 2015

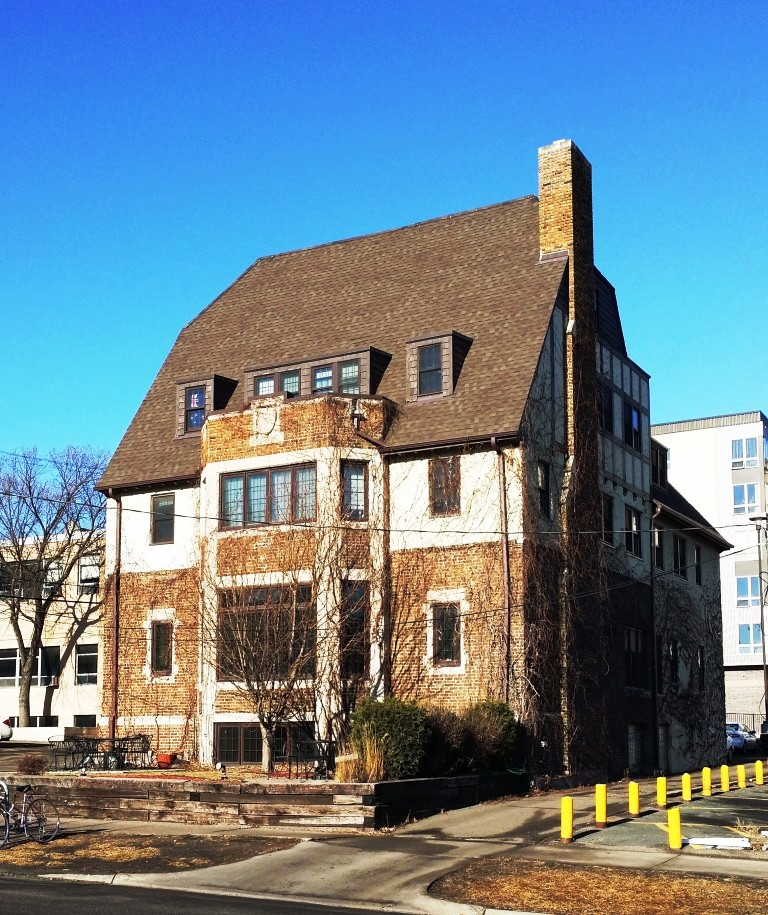
Formerly Theta Chi's Alpha Pi chapter

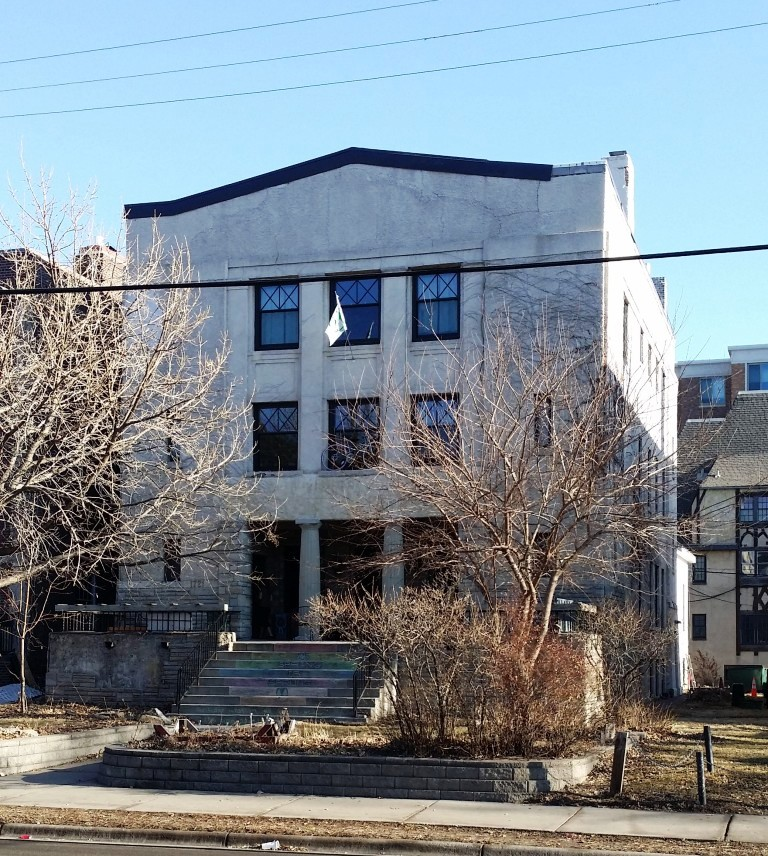
Formerly Psi Upsilon's Mu chapter

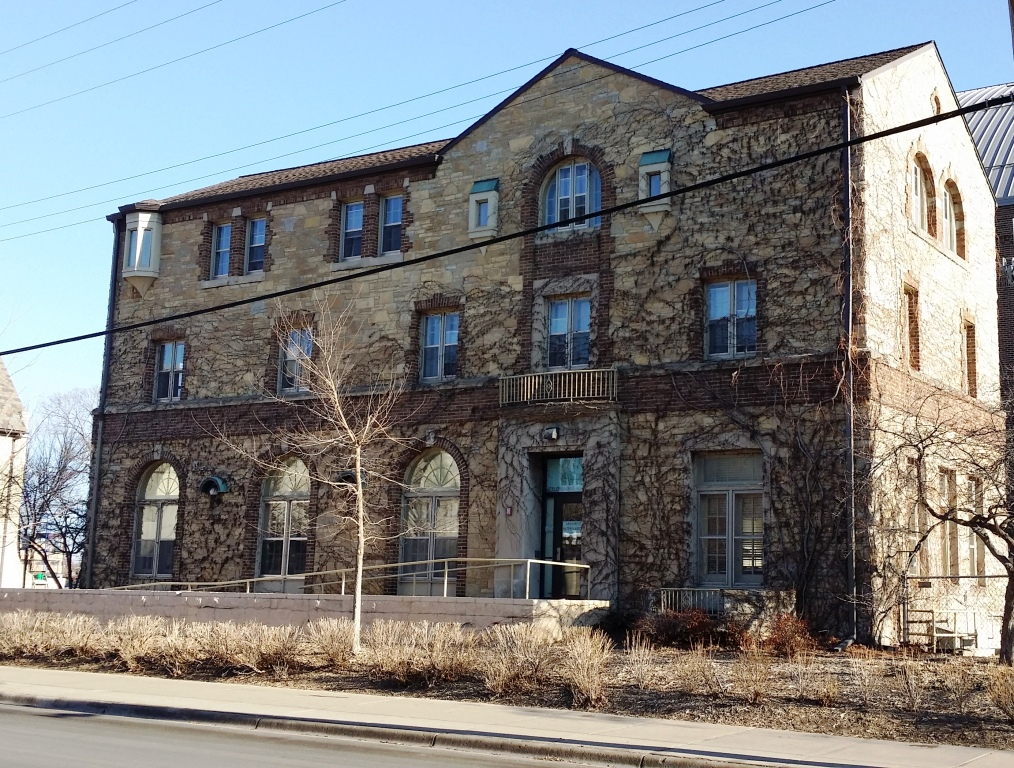
Former home of Tau Kappa Epsilon's Theta chapter in 2015

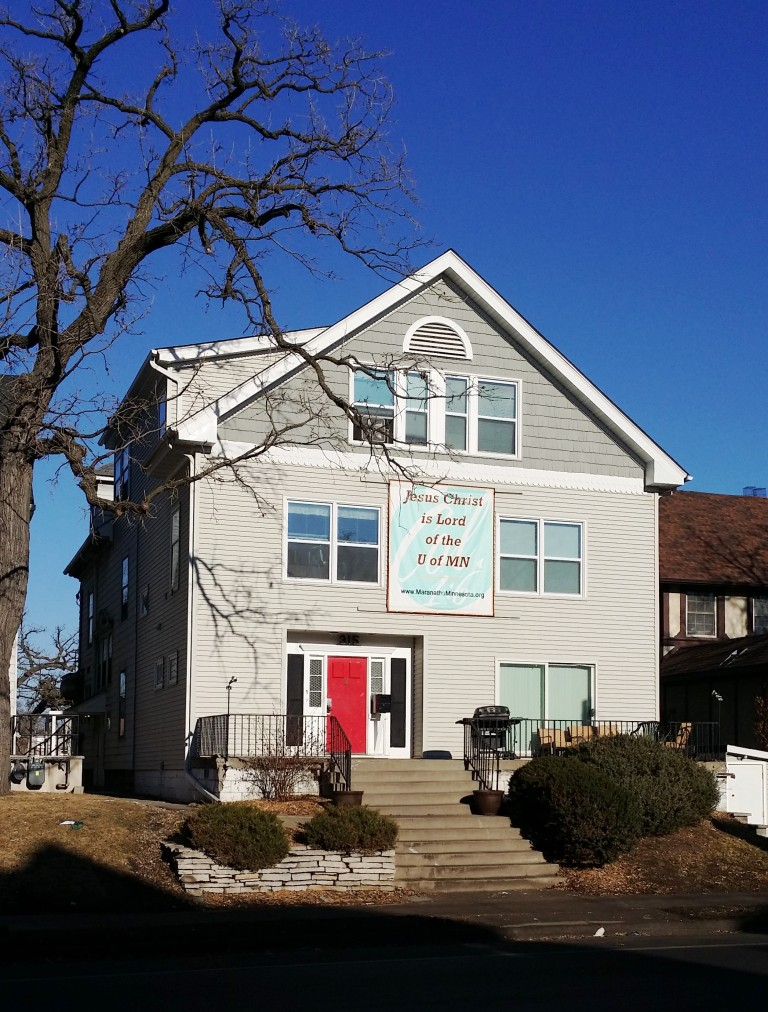
Formerly Chi O's Pi Beta chapter

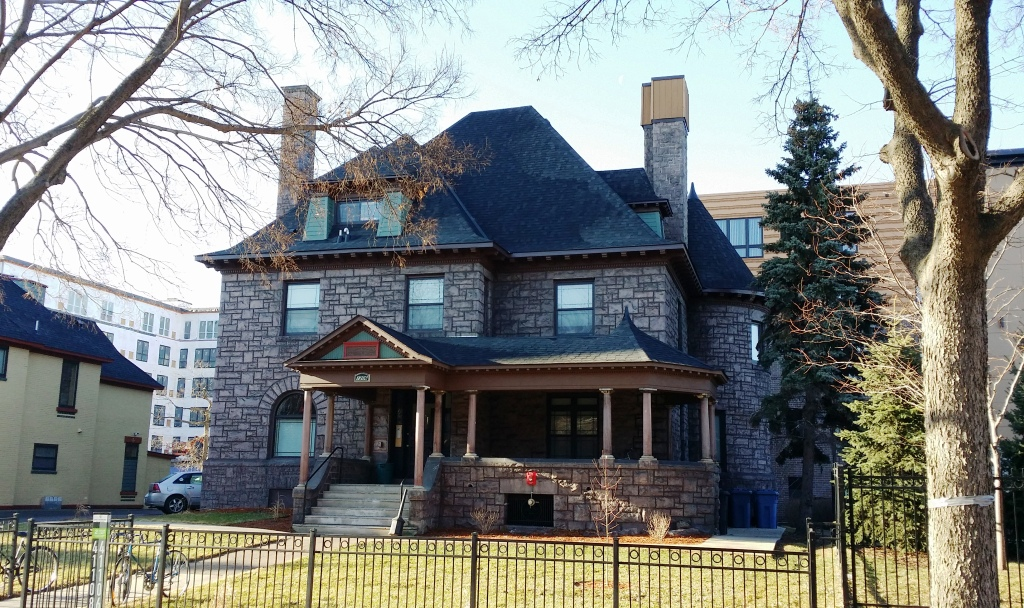
Former home of Acacia's Kaph chapter in 2015

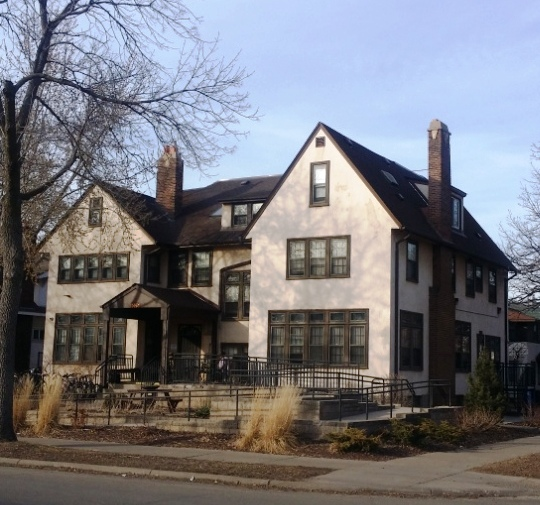
Former home of Kappa Delta's Sigma Beta chapter in 2015

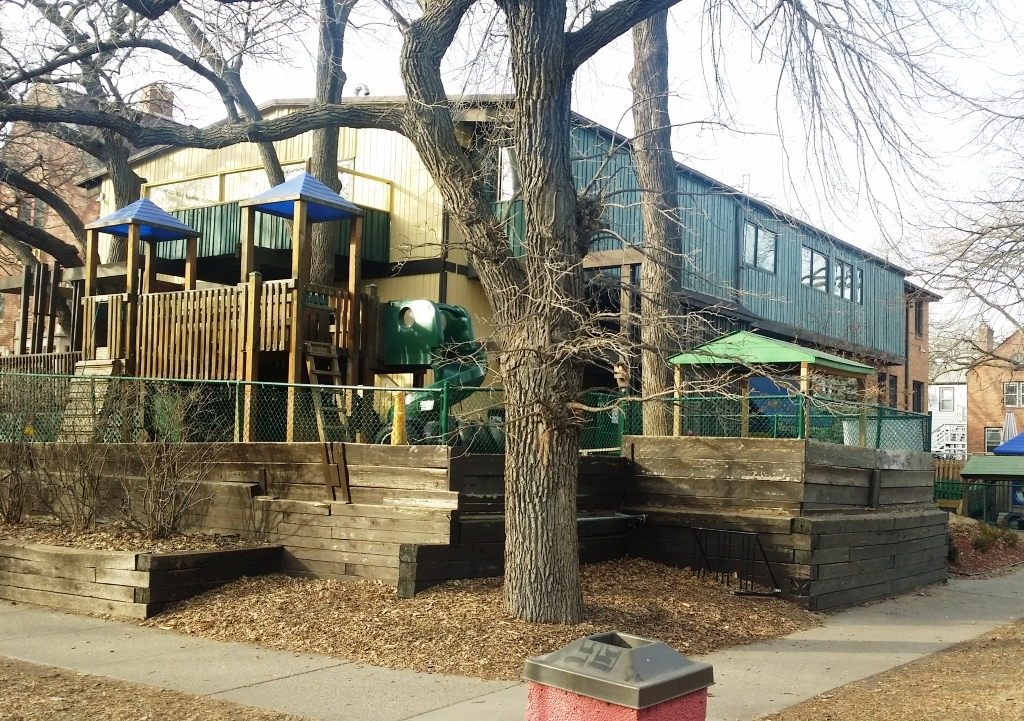
Former home of Kappa Sigma's Beta Mu chapter in 2015
- Delta Delta Delta (ΔΔΔ) sorority built the structure at 316 10th Avenue SE in 1917, owning it until at least 2004. The building is now occupied by Luther House, a Christian service group affiliated with the Lutheran Church, Missouri Synod. The adjacent building, 314 10th Avenue SE, was home to ΑΦ, then ΚΑΘ, then ΤΚΕ, before being purchased by ΔΔΔ around 1961.
- Theta Chi (ΘΧ) fraternity built the structure at 315 16th Avenue SE in 1930, owning it until at least 2000, and it was later purchased by a private party. It was renovated as a coffee house and boarding house and is leased by Kappa Pi Alpha (ΚΠΑ) Christian fraternity.
- Psi Upsilon (ΨΥ) fraternity built the structure at 1721 University Avenue SE, owning it from 1908 to 1941. The Student Co-op was established during WWII and has been a resident in that property ever since.
- Tau Kappa Epsilon (ΤΚΕ) fraternity built the structure at 1901 University Avenue SE, owning it from 1925 to 1938. In 1982 it was purchased by the YMCA, who sold it to the university in 2000.
- Chi Omega (ΧΩ) sorority was a long-term owner of the structure at 315 Tenth Avenue SE, owning it from 1927 until at least 1989. Originally built by the Zeta Psi (ΖΨ) fraternity, the structure is now owned by the Maranatha Church.
- Acacia Fraternity owned 1206 Fifth Street SE from 1915 until at least 1968. It had been occupied and then owned by the Heart of the Earth survival school, associated with the American Indian Movement, since 1980. In 2013 the building was purchased by a private developer for residential housing.
- Kappa Delta (ΚΔ) sorority owned 1025 6th Street SE for almost 50 years, a property now rented out for general student housing.
- Alpha Delta Pi (ΑΔΠ) sorority built 1000 5th Street SE in 1952, occupying it until its closure in 1987. The building was sold to the Unification Church (the "Moonies"). This property reverted to Greek ownership in 2017, with the purchase by Kappa Sigma.
- Kappa Sigma (ΚΣ) fraternity lived at 1125 5th Street SE for over 75 years, moving in 2002. Their former building is now a daycare.
- Alpha Xi Delta (ΑΞΔ) sorority owned 1115 5th Street SE for almost 40 years. It was later occupied by the Sigma Phi Epsilon fraternity and was sold to a private owner to become a Bed & breakfast. In 2019 it reverted to Greek control, under Alpha Epsilon Pi (ΑΕΠ).

These are examples. Other significant properties along University Avenue, Fourth, Fifth, and Sixth Streets SE, and the adjacent avenues were once home to Greek chapters and are now in private hands. A search of this page lists addresses where chapters once existed.

=== Future housing prospects ===
The need to improve and expand Greek chapter housing is a priority for fraternities and sororities at Minnesota. A 2012 University task force report showed that one of the biggest challenges faced by the present Greek System is the occasionally degraded state of chapter buildings. Owned privately by not-for-profit alumni associations, some of these show signs of deferred maintenance. Several recent remodeling and renovation programs have allowed significant improvement to some chapters, including recent full renovations by Chi Psi, Gamma Phi Beta, Kappa Alpha Theta, and Phi Sigma Kappa, along with completely rebuilt houses for Alpha Gamma Rho, Kappa Sig, and FarmHouse. Lack of housing for fraternities and sororities, a community that had grown to almost 15% of the student population in 2017, according to the OFSL, remains a hurdle that new groups must overcome. This dearth is only partially remedied by the opening of the new (2013) 17th Avenue Freshman Dorm. This particular project has allowed two ground-level rental suites along University Avenue for chapters new to campus, intended to serve as a long-term incubator.

The Minneapolis City Council approved several zoning changes that relaxed restrictions on Greek ownership and renovation of properties near campus, in action taken on April 28, 2017. Specific code changes include:

Increases the maximum height of chapter buildings from 2.5 stories to 4.
Removes the requirement that a house may not "serve" more than 32 people, due largely to the uncertainty of the definition of 'serve'.
Allows on-site services to be used by all members or guests.
Allows Greek chapters to acquire properties not previously used as Greek housing.
Reduces minimum lot area from 10,000 square feet to 5,000 square feet.

For a more extensive review of Greek Row buildings, past and present, see the University of Minnesota Greek Letter Chapter House Designation Study, as prepared for the Minneapolis Heritage Preservation Commission in 2003.

== Greek chapter oversight ==
Individual chapters are managed by elected officers. Incorporated alumni groups own the residential chapter buildings where they exist, serving in the role of the property manager. Additional local alumni oversight varies by chapter. National organizations provide organizational and operational guidance, extending to disciplinary action where warranted. In partnership with national organizations, university oversight of the academic and social chapters is managed on a day-to-day basis by the Office for Fraternity and Sorority Life, a unit of the Office for Student Affairs.

Professional and Honor societies are coordinated at a lower level of administrative involvement by the various academic departments within the university and its several colleges, and of these, some operate merely cooperatively, with no involvement from the university at all.

Minnesota's Greek System has, on balance, avoided the frequency of harmful events, as have occurred at other large schools; this is primarily as a result of self-policing. The original, more active relationship between the Greeks and the administration had been marginalized somewhat after the turbulent late 1960s and during the laissez-faire commuter-student years of 1970–90. This coincided with national scrutiny and bad publicity over hazing events elsewhere in the US. With the return to a more residential campus, both the Minnesota Greek System and its relationship with the university are thriving: An estimated 2,800 Greeks on campus participate in 58 separate undergraduate academic and social chapters. In addition, Professional and honor societies, many accepting undergraduates, number more than 80. Because of this and other factors, the university is again improving its relationship with the Greek Community:

In March 2012, President Kaler announced the formation of a Greek Community Strategic Task Force (GCSTF) and issued a Charge to the GCSTF Steering Committee, which emphasized the need to develop a "sustainable and robust relationship between the University and the Greek community."

== Criticism ==
Over the decades, Minnesota's Greek system, like others nationwide, has had its detractors. Most notably in the late 1960s, anti-establishment agitation resulted in decreased interest and participation. This negative environment abated with the end of the Vietnam War. While membership again surged beginning in the late 1970s, the campus population was swelling even faster. While hitting numeric highs, Greeks at Minnesota thus never achieved the pre-Vietnam era participation level as a percentage of the campus. For some, Greeks were "too exclusive." Commuting students may have had little occasion to socialize with them on the largely non-residential campus. Some students chafed at overt cultural differences where Prep-era Greek men would wear blazers and ties to Monday meetings. Occasional surveys of detractors would declare a perception that membership was akin to buying friends. For others, it was simply a monetary concern, with a reluctance to include fraternity or sorority dues into a tight college budget.

=== Response to criticism ===
==== Fixing problems ====
Greek organizations, both nationally and locally, sponsor many risk avoidance programs for the real benefits of student safety and well-being, as well as to avoid harmful bad publicity. Hence, these organizations have learned to address criticism quickly: Chapters and national bodies have adopted extensive changes to reduce incidents of hazing and other harmful behaviors. The recent announcement by Sigma Alpha Epsilon to ban "pledging" nationwide is only the latest of such announcements, of revised prospective member programs now adopted by many fraternities. While not limited to fraternities and sororities, harmful activities like underage drinking and hazing are often headlined as local news stories, with fraternity chapters as the most visible examples. In this area too, active and alumni fraternity and sorority leaders have responded to such negative publicity and the resulting criticism with programs that seek to reduce alcohol abuse and eliminate underage or binge drinking, with risk management training, by self-policing their chapters, and with more stringent procedures to discipline offenders. All sororities and some fraternity chapters have banned alcohol in their living facilities. National fraternities, through the NIC and sororities through their national and local governing boards, require member training each year to combat hazing, underage drinking, sexual assault, and other harmful behaviors. Hence, individual chapters are not alone in addressing these problems. Inter-chapter governing boards at Minnesota (listed below by chapter groupings) provide event monitoring services and local risk management training, culminating in the introduction in 2012 of Arkeo, which served as an inter-organization cooperative monitoring program to help chapters avoid risk.

==== Response to perceptions ====
As to the financial cost of participation, fraternity leaders note that the vast majority of fraternity and sorority members work their way through school. In fact, the Office of Fraternity and Sorority Life claims that the average cost burden for fraternity chapter membership adds 3% to a student budget, and may indeed be less costly on a net basis when factoring reduced summer rents and lower live-in costs versus dorms and private apartments. Finally, the Minnesota campus is markedly more residential than thirty years ago. The development of over a dozen large for-profit private dorms and many upgraded apartments has increased the average quality and quantity of near-campus housing, and has increased their average expense. The result has been that fraternities and sororities, previously perceived as among the more expensive housing options, now range from "in line with" or even lower than the average cost of dorms or apartments.

Addressing the claim of exclusivity in recruitment materials, fraternity and sorority leaders will accept that label as another way of saying they promote high standards. All fraternities are, by definition, self-selective. But, they clarify, so are all friendships. Further, they state, "U" students all have passed a bar of exclusivity by getting into the increasingly selective university itself. With an array of student groups numbering in the thousands, and a multitude of chapter personalities, fraternity and sorority proponents are confident that all students who wish to join can find a group where they can flourish. The matter of religious and race exclusivity appears to have passed several generations ago: While some chapters are historically black, Hispanic, or Asian-oriented, there is no race exclusivity or other discrimination exclusivity in any of Minnesota's chapters. All are integrated and have been for some time. Minnesota was the second Big Ten school (after Wisconsin) to see its fraternities and sororities drop all bias clauses (race, color, or creed) from their bylaws and policies. Older chapters have been integrated since the 1950s and 1960s and the multi-cultural fraternities and sororities since their founding in more recent years.

==== Benefits to student and campus ====
Fraternity and sorority participation was strongly correlated with a more positive student experience in a study conducted by the Student Organization Development Center in 1987. In 2017, the 60 current chapters of the Interfraternity Council, Pan-Hellenic Council, Multicultural Greek Council, and National Panhellenic Council provided 30,000 hours of volunteering in the surrounding community. The organizations also provide fundraising for various organizations In 2017 groups raised $200,000 for various causes.

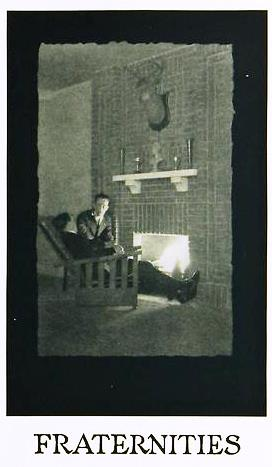
Minnesota's Fraternity & Sorority system is over 150 years old.

Community Standards Housing Inc. was incorporated by several chapters to improve fraternity and sorority housing. While CSHI's proposed Greek Village development for the 1700 block of University Avenue was not adopted in 2011, in March 2012, university President Kaler followed up on his promise at that time with the formation of a Greek Community Strategic Task Force (GCSTF), with the Charge to the group that "emphasized the need to develop a sustainable and robust relationship between the University and the Greek community." In the CHSI discussion, he stated, "[The Greeks] get better grades, graduate sooner, and give more money to the University." Under his direction, the UM Foundation collected data on fraternity and sorority participation for all students, a data point that had been only sporadically kept before 2012.

==== Graduation rates and GPA ====
Greeks continue to graduate at a faster pace and with higher GPAs than the general university population. According to 2022 figures, the All Fraternity-Sorority GPA rank for Spring 2022 was 3.38, while the All University rank was 3.32. The Panhellenic (sorority) average was 3.47, significantly ahead of the All Women's rank of 3.39, and the IFC chapters were slightly ahead of the All Men's average. Fraternity and sorority-affiliated students report higher rates of graduation within four years (79.2%) versus the UMN average of 73.3%, as reported in 2021, the most recent year released. These trends have been in place for several decades and have been noted in earlier OFSL reports. One of the drivers has been the ongoing chapter and governing body focus on "strong study habits and academic success", where fraternity and sorority members sign a grade authorization release that allows tracking of scholastic results throughout a collegian's career.

== Academic and social fraternities and sororities ==
For brevity, the sections below make extensive use of Greek letters, one of the first items in a new member's instruction program. Most fraternities use two or three Greek letters to signify their symbolic or secret names; a few use non-Greek words. (Note: Within NIC fraternities, there are three active nationals that have adopted non-Greek letter names: Acacia, FarmHouse, and Triangle. Early in the fraternity movement, a few nationals used Latin names, such as Q.T.V., but these were short-lived. No current NPC sororities have non-Greek letter names, nor do any of the multicultural or NPHC groups. The non-NPC sorority Clovia on the St. Paul campus has a non-Greek letter name, as do several professional, honor, and religious national organizations.)

=== Interfraternity Council ===
Listed with dates of local founding and national conference membership, these are men's organizations at the University of Minnesota, voluntarily coordinating their efforts within the campus IFC. While most IFC chapters are based in Minneapolis, several call St. Paul their home. After a period of level membership, for various reasons, fraternity membership is increasing rapidly. The average chapter size is 50, and several chapters exceed 100 men.

Fraternity buildings are generally owned by chapter alumni organizations. Some chapters are non-residential, while a few rent or lease space.

As part of IFC or national organization self-governance, or university disciplinary action, chapters may be suspended ("de-recognized") or closed for a time. When a chapter is closed and/or forfeits its housing, it is listed as a dormant chapter. See the Office for Fraternity and Sorority Life (OFSL) for current recognized IFC members.

(NIC) indicates members of the North American Interfraternity Conference.
(PFA) indicates members of the Professional Fraternity Association.
(FFC) indicates members of the Fraternity Forward Coalition.

==== Active academic and social fraternity chapters at Minnesota ====
- ΧΨ – Chi Psi, 1874 (NIC)^{[pic1]}
- ΔΤΔ – Delta Tau Delta, 1883 (NIC)
- ΦΚΨ – Phi Kappa Psi, 1888 (NIC)^{[pic1]}
- ΣΧ – Sigma Chi, 1888 (NIC)
- ΒΘΠ – Beta Theta Pi, 1889 (NIC)
- ΔΚΕ – Delta Kappa Epsilon, 1889 (NIC)
- ΦΓΔ – Phi Gamma Delta (ΦΓΔ and FIJI), 1890 (NIC)
- ΑΔΦ – Alpha Delta Phi, 1892–1996, 2000 (NIC)
- ΔΧ – Delta Chi, 1892 (NIC)
- ΖΨ – Zeta Psi, 1899–1982, 1987–2007, 2016 (NIC)
- ΚΣ – Kappa Sigma, 1901^{[pic1]}
- ΣΑΕ – Sigma Alpha Epsilon, 1902 (NIC)
- ΑΤΩ – Alpha Tau Omega, 1902 (NIC and FFC)
- ΣΝ – Sigma Nu, 1904 (NIC)
- ΦΣΚ – Phi Sigma Kappa, 1910 (NIC)^{[pic1]}
- ΑΦΑ – Alpha Phi Alpha, 1912 (NPHC & NIC)
- ΣΑΜ – Sigma Alpha Mu, 1915 (NIC)
- ΑΣΦ – Alpha Sigma Phi Colony, 1916–35, 2013 (FFC)
- ΣΦΕ – Sigma Phi Epsilon, 1916–41, 1949–58, 1978^{[pic1]}
- ΑΓΡ – Alpha Gamma Rho, 1917 (NIC & PFA)
- ΤΚΕ – Tau Kappa Epsilon, 1917–40, 1948–63, 1979–87, 2014^{[pic1]}
- ΠΚΑ – Pi Kappa Alpha, 1922–36, 1986–2000, 2006 (NIC)
- Triangle, 1922 (NIC)
- ΘΧ – Theta Chi, 1924–2000, 2013 (FFC)^{[pic1]}
- FH – FarmHouse, 1931 (NIC)
- ΑΕΠ – Alpha Epsilon Pi, 1949–73, 2004 (FFC)
- ΔΣΦ – Delta Sigma Phi, 1967–71, 1985–86, 2019–present (NIC)
- ΒΧΘ – Beta Chi Theta, 2006 (NAPA & NIC) South Asian interest
- ΣΠ – Sigma Pi, 2008 (NIC)

==== Chapters whose names changed ====
- ΘΦ – Theta Phi, 1879–91 (local), became ΨΥ
- Thulanian, 1889–1924 (local), became ΘΧ
- Hautbeaux Club, 1889–1890 (local), became ΔΥ
- ΑΔΕ – Alpha Delta Epsilon, 1890–1892 (local), became ΑΔΦ
- Addisonian Club, 1890–1892 (local), became ΘΔΧ
- Varsity Club, 1893–97 (local), became ΚΦΥ (see ΖΨ)
- ΚΦΒ – Kappa Phi Beta, 1893–04 (local), became ΣΝ
- ΚΦΥ – Kappa Phi Upsilon, 1897–99 (local), became ΖΨ
- ΑΚΠ – Alpha Kappa Pi, 1900–1902 (local), became ΣΑΕ
- ΑΤΔ – Alpha Tau Delta, 1901 (local), became ΑΤΩ
- Acacia Club, 1903–06, became Acacia
- ΧΡΘ – Chi Rho Theta, 1907–16 (local), became ΣΦΕ
- FLX Club, 1908–10 (local), became ΦΣΚ
- Svithiod, 1911–21 (local), became ΧΔΞ (see ΧΦ)
- ΦΑΤ – Phi Alpha Tau, 1911–1912 (local), became ΑΦΑ
- ΑΚΣ – Alpha Kappa Sigma, 1911–1920 (local), became ΘΞ
- Uta Oto, 1914–1917 (local), became ΑΓΡ
- ΞΨΘ – Xi Psi Theta, 1914–23 (local), Jewish, became ΦΕΠ (see ΖΒΤ)
- Omar Club, 1914–15 (local), became ΑΘΨ (see ΑΣΦ)
- ΑΚΦ – Alpha Kappa Phi, 1915–16 (local), became ΦΚΣ
- ΑΘΨ – Alpha Theta Psi, 1915–16 (local), became ΑΣΦ
- ΗΣΡ – Eta Sigma Rho, 1916–1917 (local), became ΤΚΕ
- Mandarin Club, 1919–1923 (local), became ΜΔΦ (see ΛΧΑ)
- ΧΔΞ – Chi Delta Xi, 1921–28 (local), became ΧΦ
- ΧΣΤ – Chi Sigma Tau, 1921–22 (local), became Triangle'
- Phi Club, 1921–23, Jewish, became ΦΕΠ (see ΖΒΤ)
- ΑΧΑ – Alpha Chi Alpha, 1921–22 (local), became ΠΚΑ
- Sphinx, 1922–25 (local), became ΛΧΑ
- ΜΔΦ – Mu Delta Phi, 1923–1925 (local), became ΘΚΝ (see ΛΧΑ)
- ΦΕΠ – Phi Epsilon Pi, 1923–70, Jewish, became ΖΒΤ
- ΘΚΝ – Theta Kappa Nu, 1925–33, dormant (see ΛΧΑ)
- ΒΣΕ – Beta Sigma Epsilon, 1924–28 (local), Jewish, became ΤΔΦ
- ΦΒΔ – Phi Beta Delta, 1925–33, Jewish, dormant (see ΠΛΦ)
- ΦΚ – Phi Kappa, 1947–59, became ΦΚΘ

==== Dormant fraternity chapters ====
- ΦΔΘ – Phi Delta Theta, 1881–1889, 1891–1994, 2010–2021
- ΔΥ – Delta Upsilon, 1890–1986, 1991–2018 (NIC), dormant
- ΨΥ – Psi Upsilon, 1891–1993 (NIC), dormant^{[pic1]}
- ΘΔΧ – Theta Delta Chi, 1892–1984 (NIC), dormant
- ΘΝΕ – Theta Nu Epsilon, 1893–1900?, −1934 (later NIC), dormant
- Acacia, 1904–1978, 1983–93 (NIC), dormant^{[pic1]}
- ΦΚΣ – Phi Kappa Sigma, 1916–43, 2013–2020 (NIC), dormant
- ΘΞ – Theta Xi, 1920–65 (NIC), dormant
- ΧΣΦ – Chi Sigma Phi, 1924–28 (local), dormant
- ΛΧΑ – Lambda Chi Alpha, 1925–38, 1947–59 (NIC), dormant
- ΠΛΦ – Pi Lambda Phi, 1925–33 (NIC), Jewish, dormant
- ΤΔΦ – Tau Delta Phi, 1928–52 (NIC), Jewish, dormant
- ΧΦ – Chi Phi, 1928–43, 1946–94 (NIC), dormant
- ΦΚΘ – Phi Kappa Theta, 1947–61 (NIC), dormant
- ΖΒΤ – Zeta Beta Tau, 1949–53 (NIC) (1914–70 as ΞΨΘ or ΦΕΠ), dormant
- ΒΣΨ – Beta Sigma Psi, 1963–83 (NIC), Lutheran Church, dormant
- ΩΝΑ – Omega Nu Alpha, 2000–13 (local), dormant

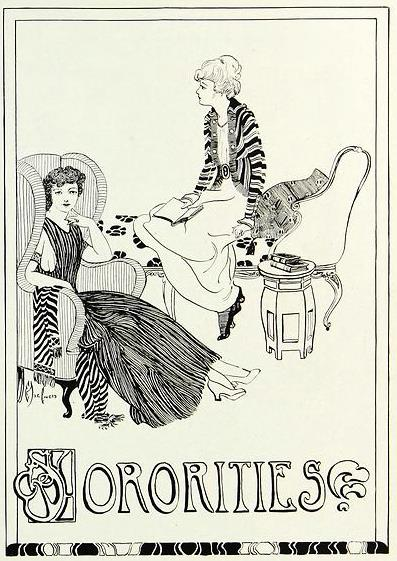
Frontispiece, sorority section – 1916 Minnesota Gopher yearbook

=== Panhellenic Council (PHC) ===
Listed with dates of local founding and national conference membership, these are women's organizations, voluntarily coordinating their efforts within the PHC. For convenience, the term "sorority" is used throughout, though some of these organizations are "women's fraternities," and were so named before the popularization of the term, sorority. The terms are synonymous, After a period of level membership representing about 3% of campus women, for various reasons, sorority membership is increasing rapidly. Chapter size in almost all cases now exceeds 120 women.

Interest and recruitment are strong enough that, in 2013, the University of Minnesota was opened to PHC expansion for the first time in 30 years, and the resulting two colonization efforts (welcoming Chi Omega and Phi Mu) occurred in 2013 and 2016, respectively.

Sorority properties are generally owned by a chapter's alumnae club, though some chapters do not have housing, and others rent or lease space. As part of PHC or national organization self-governance, or university disciplinary action, chapters may be suspended ("de-recognized") or closed for a time. If a chapter is closed and/or forfeits its housing, it will be listed as a dormant chapter. See the Office for Fraternity and Sorority Life (OFSL) for current PHC members and for expansion support.

(NPC) indicates members of the National Panhellenic Conference.

==== Active academic and social sorority chapters ====
- ΚΚΓ – Kappa Kappa Gamma, 1880 (NPC)^{[pic1]}
- ΔΓ – Delta Gamma, 1882 (NPC)
- ΚΑΘ – Kappa Alpha Theta, 1889 (NPC)
- ΑΦ – Alpha Phi, 1890 (NPC)
- ΠΒΦ – Pi Beta Phi, 1890–1897, 1905 (NPC)
- ΓΦΒ – Gamma Phi Beta, 1902 (NPC)
- ΑΓΔ – Alpha Gamma Delta, 1908 (NPC)
- ΑΟΠ – Alpha Omicron Pi, 1912 (NPC)
- ΑΧΩ – Alpha Chi Omega, 1921 (NPC)
- ΧΩ – Chi Omega, 1921–89, 2013 (NPC)^{[pic1]}
- ΦΜ – Phi Mu, 1925–35, 1946–70, 2016 (NPC)
- Clovia (Beta of Clovia), 1939 4-H origin
- ΛΔΦ – Lambda Delta Phi, 1961 regional
- ΑΣΚ – Alpha Sigma Kappa, 1989, technical studies
- ΣΑΕΠ – Sigma Alpha Epsilon Pi, 2003–08, 2018, Jewish culture

==== Chapters whose names changed ====
- Secret Six, 1889–1890 (local), became ΠΒΦ
- Khalailu Club, 1901–02 (local), became ΓΦΒ
- ΒΙΓ – Beta Iota Gamma, ~1904–1906 (local), became ΠΒΦ
- ΛΒ – Lambda Beta, 1905–1907 (local), became ΑΞΔ
- ΣΒ – Sigma Beta, 1910–18 (local), became ΚΔ
- ΠΘΠ – Pi Theta Pi, 1910–12 (local), became ΑΟΠ
- Areme, 1915–1917 (local), became Achoth (see ΔΖ)
- Scroll and Key, 1916–28 (local), became ΣΔΤ
- Achoth, 1917–22, Masonic-sponsored sorority, became ΦΩΠ (see ΔΖ)
- ΦΩΠ – Phi Omega Pi 1917–42, became ΔΖ
- ΔΦ – Delta Phi, 1920–1921 (local), became ΧΩ
- ΔΘΕ – Delta Theta Epsilon, 1920–1921 (local), became ΣΚ
- ΑΡ – Alpha Rho, 1920–24 (local), became ΖΤΑ
- ΑΛ – Alpha Lambda, 1920–1921 (local), became ΑΧΩ
- ΣΚ – Sigma Kappa, 1921–61 (NPC), became ΒΤΛ (local)
- ΖΑ – Zeta Alpha, 1923–27 (local), became ΒΦΑ (see ΔΖ)
- ΒΦΑ – Beta Phi Alpha, 1927–40, dormant (see ΔΖ)
- ΦΔΣ – Phi Delta Sigma, 1927–1930 (local), became ΑΔΘ (see ΦΜ)
- ΑΔΘ – Alpha Delta Theta, 1930–34, became ΦΜ
- ΓΣΦ – Gamma Sigma Phi, 1936–1938 (local), became ΑΕΦ
- ΣΦΗ – Sigma Phi Eta, 1937–1939 (local), became Clovia
- ΝΣΠ – Nu Sigma Pi, 1959–1961 (local), became ΛΔΦ
- Triangle Little Sisters, 1983–1989 (local), became ΑΣΚ
- ΚΛΕ – Kappa Lambda Epsilon, 2016–2018 (local), Jewish, became ΣΑΕΠ

==== Dormant sorority chapters ====
- ΔΔΔ – Delta Delta Delta, 1894–2004 (NPC), dormant^{[pic1]}
- ΑΞΔ – Alpha Xi Delta, 1907–60, 1983–87 (NPC), dormant^{[pic1]}
- ΚΔ – Kappa Delta, 1918–72 (NPC), dormant^{[pic1]}
- ΑΔΠ – Alpha Delta Pi, 1923–87 (NPC), dormant^{[pic1]}
- ΔΖ – Delta Zeta, 1923–65 (NPC), dormant
- ΖΤΑ – Zeta Tau Alpha, 1924–59 (NPC), dormant
- ΓΟΒ – Gamma Omicron Beta, 1928–89 (local), St. Paul sorority, dormant
- ΒΙΑ – Beta Iota Alpha, 1928-19xx (local), dormant
- ΔΦΕ – Delta Phi Epsilon, 1929–32 (NPC), Jewish, dormant
- ΣΔΤ – Sigma Delta Tau, 1929–94 (NPC), dormant
- ΑΕΦ – Alpha Epsilon Phi, 1938–78, 2009–17 (NPC), dormant
- ΒΤΛ – Beta Tau Lambda, 1961–64 (local, had been ΣΚ), dormant
- ΦΒΧ – Phi Beta Chi, 2011–19, Christian values, dormant

=== Multicultural and National Panhellenic Councils ===
Originally ethnic or language-affiliated, these organizations are now fully integrated – as are the university general fraternities and sororities. Their historical affiliation may be reviewed by reading their local or national histories. Some of the men's groups also participate in IFC events and the women's groups in PHC events.

At the University of Minnesota, the Multicultural Greek Council and National Pan-Hellenic Council chapters are non-residential. The councils often cooperate on programs and policies, as do individual chapters from among the councils.

Listed with dates of local founding and national conference membership, these are either men's or women's organizations, voluntarily coordinating their efforts within the larger Multicultural Greek Council (MGC) and for some, in the National Pan-Hellenic Council (NPHC).

(NALFO) indicates members of the National Association of Latino Fraternal Organizations;
(NAPA) indicates members of the National APIDA Panhellenic Association;
(NPHC) indicates members of the National Pan-Hellenic Council;
(NPC) indicates members of the National Panhellenic Conference.

==== Men's NPHC chapters ====
- ΑΦΑ – Alpha Phi Alpha, 1912 (NPHC & NIC)
- ΩΨΦ – Omega Psi Phi, 1921 (NPHC)
- ΦΑΤ – Phi Alpha Tau, 1911–1912 (local), became ΑΦΑ
- ΚΑΨ – Kappa Alpha Psi, 1924-1967+, 1978 (NPHC, NIC)
- ΦΒΣ – Phi Beta Sigma, 1985–89, 2008 (NPHC & NIC)

==== Men's MGC chapters ====
- ΣΛΒ – Sigma Lambda Beta, 1999 (MGC & NIC) Latino interest
- ΒΧΘ – Beta Chi Theta, 2006 (NAPA & NIC) South Asian interest
- ΠΔΨ – Pi Delta Psi, 2011 (NAPA) Asian-American interest
- ΛΦΕ – Lambda Phi Epsilon, 2020 (NAPA & NIC) colony, Asian interest
- ΔΛΦ – Delta Lambda Phi, 1987–2019 (MGC), gay, bi and progressive men, dormant
- ΣΒΡ – Sigma Beta Rho 2013–2015 (NAPA & NIC), South Asian interest, dormant

==== Women's NPHC chapters ====
- ΑΚΑ – Alpha Kappa Alpha, 1922-59+, 1979 (NPHC)
- ΔΣΘ – Delta Sigma Theta, 1975 (NPHC & NPC)
- ΖΦΒ – Zeta Phi Beta, 1997 (NPHC)
- ΣΓΡ – Sigma Gamma Rho, 1970 (NPHC)

==== Women's MGC chapters ====
- ΣΛΓ – Sigma Lambda Gamma, 2000 (formerly NALFO), Latina and multicultural
- ΔΦΩ – Delta Phi Omega, 2011 (NAPA), colony, South Asian-interest
- ΑΦΓ – Alpha Phi Gamma, 2014 (NAPA), Asian-interest
- ΣΨΖ – Sigma Psi Zeta, 2014 (NAPA), Asian-interest
- ΚΦΛ – Kappa Phi Lambda associate chapter, 2021 (NAPA), Asian-interest
- ΔΦΛ – Delta Phi Lambda associate chapter, 2023 (NAPA), Asian-interest
- ΦΣΡ - Phi Sigma Rho interest group, 2023. STEM emphasis, female and non-binary.

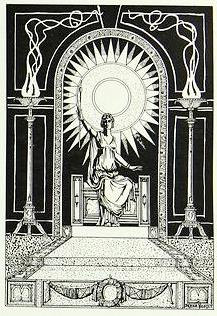
Frontispiece, Honor Society section, 1922 Minnesota Gopher yearbook

== Honor, professional, service, and recognition societies ==
Honorific, professional, and service organizations have a similarly long history of activity on the University of Minnesota campus. These are coordinated through academic departments, not the OFSL. They use similar naming conventions for chapter and national organizational hierarchy, and Greek letters as identification. Some of these are populated by graduate students, a few exclusively so. As a rule, the honor and professional societies focus on specific academic, professional, or service missions. Historically too there has been significant crossover and cooperation between types; some professional societies have revised themselves into non-residential honor groups. In contrast, several professional organizations have gone the other direction to a conference among the academic and social chapters. But most remain oriented toward senior students (including 3rd and 4th year students) and graduate students. Social/academic fraternity or sorority membership is not a requirement for these groups. Individuals who meet a group's criteria may join or be "tapped," or asked to join. Multiple affiliations may be allowable as membership is frequently not exclusive to one group – see individual societies for details. Activity varies; some of the professional and service groups are residential, while the honors societies may meet only quarterly or annually, if at all. The cut-off line where any campus organization falls within these headings, or without, is by long-established convention; those formed before 1990 are listed under the subheadings used by various volumes of the Baird's Manual of American College Fraternities, which for more than a century has been the data source of record for such organizations. Newer groups have been placed in categories similar to Baird's. The latest version of Baird's, 1991, was published before the national development of some of the societies here, and therefore, position and inclusion are, in some cases, assumptive.

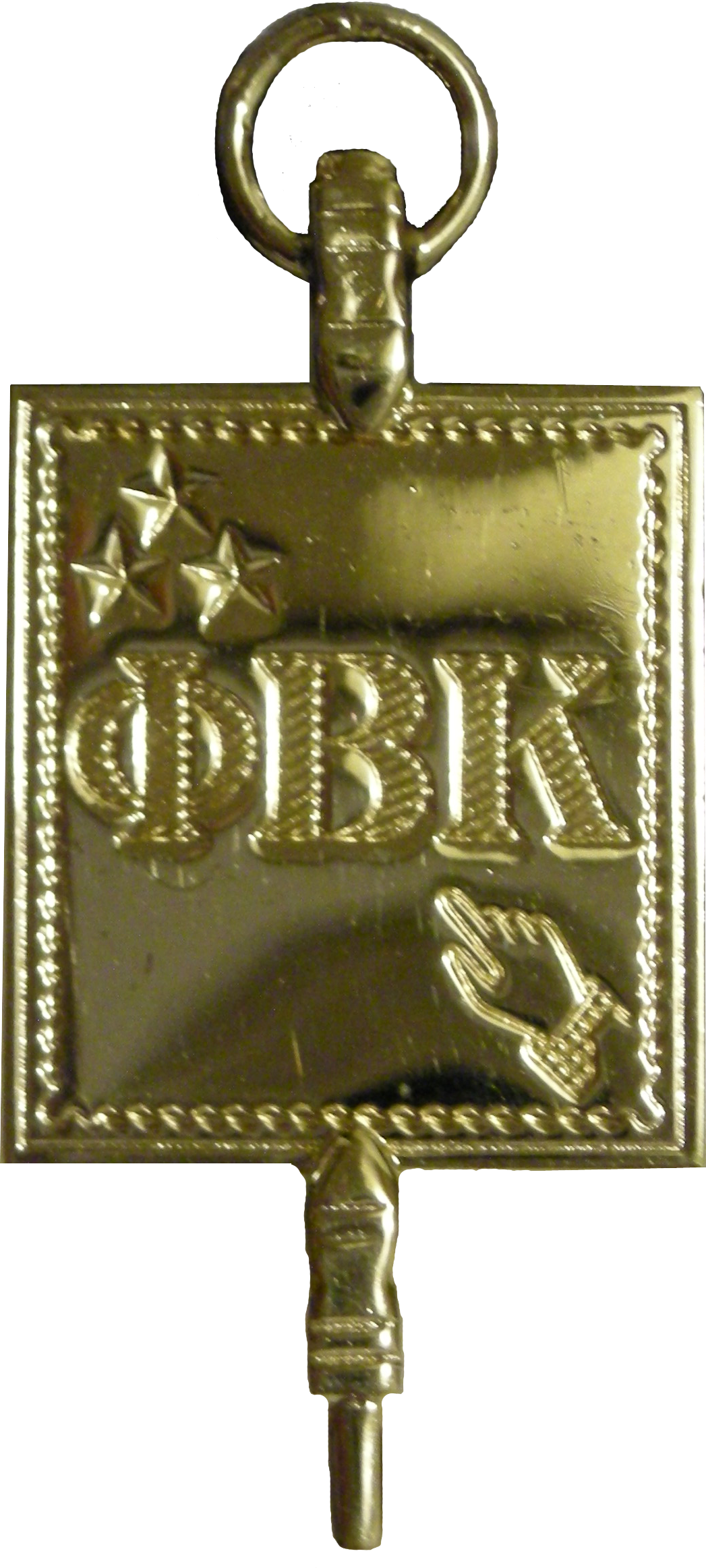
The Phi Beta Kappa Key. Minnesota's chapter was formed in 1892.

=== Honor and recognition societies ===
Honor societies recognize students who excel academically or as leaders among their peers, usually within a specific academic discipline. Because of the age, size, and research focus of the University of Minnesota, it hosts a wide variety of these organizations. Members commonly include the society on their résumé/CV, which may serve to bolster grad school acceptance, publishing merit, and professional opportunities.

Listed by date of local founding with national conference membership, these are co-ed, non-residential, achievement-based organizations that self-select members based on published criteria.

At graduation, or at times of formal academic processionals, graduates, administrators, PhD holders, and post-doctoral fellows wear academic robes in the colors of their degree, school, and other distinction, according to a voluntary Intercollegiate Code that governs customs such as formal academic regalia. In addition, various colored devices such as stoles, scarfs, cords, Tassels, and medallions are used to indicate membership in a student's honor society; cords and mortarboard tassels are most common. Phi Beta Kappa, the first honor society, locally founded at Minnesota in 1892, has used pink and sky blue since its national founding in 1776. Hence, students tapped for ΦΒΚ may wear tassels or other society-approved items, in these colors. Like most schools, the University of Minnesota allows such regalia for honor society members. Stoles are less common, but they are used by a few honor societies. In academic circles, colors are well-known and follow long-standing protocols. The ACHS website lists the colors for their 68 member organizations, and the honor society WP page lists others.

Many honor societies invite students to become members based on scholastic rank (the top x% of a class) and/or grade point, either overall, or for classes taken within the discipline for which the honor society provides recognition. In cases where academic achievement would not be an appropriate criterion for membership, other standards are required for membership (such as completion of a particular ceremony or training program). These societies recognize past achievement. Pledging is not required, and new candidates may be immediately inducted into membership after meeting predetermined academic criteria and paying a one-time membership fee. Some require graduate enrollment. Because of their purpose of recognition, most honor societies will have much higher academic achievement requirements for membership than professional societies. It is also common for a scholastic honor society to add a criterion relating to the character of the student. Some honor societies are invitation only while others allow unsolicited applications. Finally, membership in an honor society might be considered exclusive, i.e., a member of such an organization cannot join other honor societies representing the same field. Governance requires a faculty sponsor and each society remains faculty-guided, usually with alumni input.

(ACHS) indicates members of the Association of College Honor Societies.

==== Active honor and recognition societies ====
- ΦΔΦ – Phi Delta Phi, 1891, legal honors
- ΦΒΚ – Phi Beta Kappa, 1892, academic honors
- ΣΞ – Sigma Xi, 1896, graduate science and engineering honors
- Mortar Board, 1903–19 as local, 1919 (ACHS), scholarship, leadership and public service honors
- Iron Wedge, 1911-197x, 1985 (local), Greek interfraternalism, merit and leadership, seniors, now secret
- ΑΩΑ – Alpha Omega Alpha, 1908, graduate medical honors
- ΦΥΟ – Phi Upsilon Omicron, 1909 (ACHS), family and consumer sciences honors
- ΤΒΠ – Tau Beta Pi, 1910 (ACHS), engineering honors
- ΦΛΥ – Phi Lambda Upsilon, 1910 (ACHS), chemistry honors
- Order of the Coif, 1915, law school graduates honors
- ΓΣΔ – Gamma Sigma Delta, 1916, agriculture honors
- ΤΣΔ – Tau Sigma Delta, 1917 (ACHS), architecture and allied arts honors
- ΠΛΘ – Pi Lambda Theta, 1917 (ACHS), women's education honors
- ΔΦΔ – Delta Phi Delta, 1919, art honors
- ΗΚΝ – Eta Kappa Nu, 1920, IEEE affiliation, electrical engineering, computer engineering honors.
- ΞΣΠ – Xi Sigma Pi, 1920, forestry honors
- ΒΓΣ – Beta Gamma Sigma, 1921 (ACHS), business academic honors
- ΠΤΣ – Pi Tau Sigma, 1922 (ACHS), mechanical engineering honors
- Block and Bridle, 1923, animal livestock honors
- ΣΓΕ – Sigma Gamma Epsilon, 1922, earth sciences honors
- ΧΕ – Chi Epsilon, 1923 (ACHS), civil engineering honors
- ΙΣΠ – Iota Sigma Pi, 1923, women's, chemistry and related sciences honors
- Phalanx, 1925 (earlier?)-1950+, military, cadets honors
- Plumb Bob, 1926 (local), technical studies honors
- ΕΣΠ – Epsilon Sigma Phi, 1927, extension student honors
- ΟΚΥ – Omicron Kappa Upsilon, 1929, dentistry honors
- ΡΧ – Rho Chi, 1930 (ACHS), pharmacy honors
- ΣΕΣ – Sigma Epsilon Sigma, 1930, freshman women, scholarship honors
- ΠΣΗ – Pi Sigma Eta 1930, mortuary science honors
- ΒΑΨ – Beta Alpha Psi, 1931, accounting, finance and information systems honors
- ΣΘΤ – Sigma Theta Tau, 1934 (ACHS), nursing honors
- ΩΧΕ – Omega Chi Epsilon, 1934 (ACHS), chemical engineering honors
- ΨΧ – Psi Chi, 1936 (ACHS), psychology honors
- ΦΑΘ – Phi Alpha Theta, 1937 (ACHS), history honors
- ΚΤΑ – Kappa Tau Alpha, 1948 (ACHS), journalism, mass communication honors
- AAS – Arnold Air Society, pre-1949, Air Force cadet honors
- ΠΔΦ – Pi Delta Phi, 1950 (ACHS), French honors
- ΤΒΣ – Tau Beta Sigma, 1952 (NIMC), co-ed band honors
- ΦΖ – Phi Zeta, 1952, graduate veterinary medicine honors
- ΣΓΤ – Sigma Gamma Tau, 1953 (ACHS), aerospace honors
- Silver Wings, 1954, National defense oriented service organization
- ΑΚΔ – Alpha Kappa Delta, 1956 (ACHS), sociology honors
- ΠΚΛ – Pi Kappa Lambda, 1958 (ACHS), music honors
- ΣΦΑ – Sigma Phi Alpha, 1958, dental hygiene honors
- Evans Scholars, 1958 (residential) golf caddies honors
- ΑΕ – Alpha Epsilon, 1960 (ACHS), agricultural, food, and biological engineering honors
- ΠΑΞ – Pi Alpha Xi, 1968, horticulture honors
- ΡΛ – Rho Lambda, 1974, women's Greek leadership honors
- ΦΚΦ – Phi Kappa Phi, 1974, honors, all disciplines
- ΟΔΕ – Omicron Delta Epsilon, 1977 (ACHS), economics honors
- Order of Omega, 1979, Greek society leadership honors
- ΣΠΣ – Sigma Pi Sigma, 1979 (ACHS), physics honors
- ΣΛΑ – Sigma Lambda Alpha, 1979 (ACHS), landscape architecture honors
- ΦΤΣ – Phi Tau Sigma, 1981, food science and technology honors
- Golden Key, 1982, high achievement in academics, leadership & service
- ΔΩ – Delta Omega, 1985, public health honors
- ΑΕΔ – Alpha Epsilon Delta, 1993 (ACHS), pre-med honors
- ΦΛΣ – Phi Lambda Sigma, 1993, pharmacy leadership society
- ΚΚΨ – Kappa Kappa Psi, 1994 (NIMC), band and performance honors
- ΗΣΦ – Eta Sigma Phi, 1995, classics honors
- ΥΦΔ – Upsilon Phi Delta, 1999, healthcare administration
- Collegiate Scholars – Nat'l Society of Collegiate Scholars (NSCS), 1999 (ACHS), high achievement
- ΠΑΑ – Pi Alpha Alpha, 2010, public administration honors
- ΤΣ – Tau Sigma, 2014, honoring transfer students for academic achievement and involvement
- ΣΑΛ – Sigma Alpha Lambda, 20xx, leadership and service honors
- ΣΛΧ – Sigma Lambda Chi, 2017, construction management honors
- ΦΒΔ – Phi Beta Delta, 1990?, international scholars honors
- National fraternity key societies – There are many of these, often provided to members of national academic and social fraternities and sororities. They provide a subtle way of noting fraternity membership on a résumé and tying it to academic achievement.

==== Chapters whose names changed ====
- Honors Society of Agriculture, 1915–17 (local), agriculture honorary, became ΓΣΔ
- 30 Club, 1916–17 (local), an organization formed by women doing editorial work on the "Minnesota Gopher," the "Minnehaha" monthly humor magazine, and the "Minnesota Daily." Became ΘΣΦ (see AWC)
- ΘΣΦ – Theta Sigma Phi, 1917–68+, women's journalism honors, became the AWC.
- ΓΕΠ – Gamma Epsilon Pi, 1921–33, women's, commerce honorary, dormant, see ΒΓΣ
- ΦΣΦ – Phi Sigma Phi, 1921–70+ (local), music and University Band honors, became the BSO (see ΤΒΣ & ΚΚΨ)
- ΠΔΕ – Pi Delta Epsilon, 1922-1929+, men's journalism honorary, dormant (see the Society for Collegiate Journalists)
- ΟΝ – Omicron Nu, 1923–1980+, home economics, became ΚΟΝ
- ΘΝ – Theta Nu, 1944–52 (local), women's band honorary, became ΤΒΣ
- ΤΩ – Tau Omega, 1943–53, aerospace engineering honors, became ΣΓΤ
- Angel Flight, 1954, auxiliary to Arnold Air Society, became Silver Wings

==== Dormant honor and recognition societies ====
- ΔΣ – Delta Sigma Society, 1889–1895?, literary and debate society, dormant
- ΠΒΝ – Pi Beta Nu, 1888–93+ (local), senior honors, limited to five per class, dormant
- ΚΒΦ – Kappa Beta Phi, 1893–1935?, satiric, later financial honors, dormant
- Scabbard and Blade, 1906–80+ (ACHS), military honors, dormant?
- ΔΣΡ-ΤΚΑ – Delta Sigma Rho-Tau Kappa Alpha, 1906-1980+, 2012?–2014? forensics honor, dormant
- ΛΑΨ – Lambda Alpha Psi, 1908–52+ (local), languages honors, dormant
- ΜΦΔ – Mu Phi Delta, 1908–15+ (local), men's and women's music honors, dormant
- Grey Friars, 1909–70+ (local) senior men, of honors and service to the university, dormant
- Association for Women in Communications, 1911–59+, women's journalism honors, dormant
- ΦΑΤ – Phi Alpha Tau, 1911–~1915, national public speakers and actors honors, dormant
- ΣΔΨ – Sigma Delta Psi, 1912-1970+, national athletics recognition society, dormant ?
- Wing and Bow, pre-1913-1934+ (local?), inter-fraternal agricultural honorary, dormant
- ΚΡ – Kappa Rho, 1914–34+ (local), women's forensics honors(?), dormant
- Skin and Bones, 1915–31+ (local), woman's inter-sorority honors, juniors, dormant
- White Dragon, 1916–68+ (local), Juniors, inter-fraternity honors (originally ΧΨ, ΦΚΨ, ΨΥ, ΔΚΕ, ΑΔΦ, later included others), dormant
- ΖΚΨ – Zeta Kappa Psi, 1917-19xx, women's forensics honors, dormant
- ΔΦΛ – Delta Phi Lambda, 1917–51+ (local), women's, later co-ed creative writing honors, dormant
- Incus, 1917–34+ (local), medical honorary, dormant
- Silver Spur, 1918-1959+, leadership honors, dormant
- ΤΥΚ – Tau Upsilon Kappa, 1919–31+ (local), men's inter-fraternity honors, dormant
- Mortar and Ball, 1920–48+, advanced military cadets honorary, dormant
- ΩΗΜ – Omega Eta Mu, pre-1920-19xx (local), dentistry honorary, dormant
- ΠΑ – Pi Alpha, 1921-1929+, men's art honorary, dormant
- ΠΕΔ National Collegiate Players or Pi Epsilon Delta, 1922–1970+, theater honors, dormant
- ΑΠΩ – Alpha Pi Omega, 1922-19xx (local), School of Mines honorary, dormant
- ΔΣΨ – Delta Sigma Psi, 1922–1924+ (local), scholarship and investigation in Norwegian literature, dormant
- Torch and Distaff, 1922–1931+ (local), home economics honors, dormant
- Order of the Hub, 1922-23+ (local), interfraternity honors, dormant
- ΚΟΝ – Kappa Omicron Nu, 1923–1980+ (ACHS), humanities honors, dormant
- ΑΔΣ – Alpha Delta Sigma (AAF), 1923–1973, advertising honors, dormant
- ΠΤΠΣ Pi Tau Pi Sigma, 1925-1942+ military, signal corps honors, dormant
- ΑΣΠ – Alpha Sigma Pi, 1926–1964 (local), senior men's education honors, dormant
- ΗΣΥ – Eta Sigma Upsilon, 1927–1964 (local), senior women's education honors, dormant
- Phoenix, 1930–59+ (local), junior men's service and recognition, dormant
- Orbs, 1935-66+ (local), women's medical technology honors, dormant
- Commacini Club, 1936–43 (local), architecture honorary, dormant
- ΒΦΒ – Beta Phi Beta, pre-1943-52+ (local), General College honorary, dormant
- ΩΡ – Omega Rho, pre-1946-50+ (local), Ceramic Arts honorary, dormant
- ΣΓΤ – Sigma Gamma Tau, 1943–96, aerospace engineering honors, dormant
- Chimes, 1948–70, junior women's honors, dormant
- ΑΜ – Alpha Mu, pre-1951-1955+, grain engineering, dormant
- ΟΔΚ – Omicron Delta Kappa, 1976–2010, leadership and academic honors, dormant
- ΓΘΥ – Gamma Theta Upsilon, 1990–2006 (ACHS), geography honors, dormant
- ΟΣΣ – Omicron Sigma Sigma or Order of the Sword & Shield, 2011?–2017?, homeland security, intel, emergency mgmt & protective security honors, dormant

=== Professional societies ===
Professional societies work to build friendship bonds among members, cultivate strengths whereby members may promote their profession, and provide mutual assistance in their shared areas of professional study.

Listed by date of local founding with national conference membership (if any), these are primarily co-ed organizations, showing an array of professional interests. Some are residential in a co-operative fashion, and all offer a moderate amount of social programming. Membership in a professional fraternity may be gained by the result of a pledge process, much like a social fraternity, and members are expected to remain loyal and active in the organization for life. Within their professional field of study, membership is exclusive; for example, if one joins a law society, they cannot join another law society. However, these societies do initiate members who belong to social or honor fraternities. Professional societies are known for networking and post-collegiate involvement, and membership is often included with pride on a résumé/CV. Governance varies from faculty-managed to purely student-run.

(PFA) indicates members of the Professional Fraternity Association.

==== Active professional societies ====
- ΝΣΝ – Nu Sigma Nu, 1891, medical (residential)
- ΔΣΔ – Delta Sigma Delta, 1892, dentistry, medicine pharmacy (residential)
- ΨΩ – Psi Omega, 1896–1903, 1918, dentistry (residential)
- ΦΡΣ – Phi Rho Sigma, 1904 (PFA), medical (residential)
- ΑΧΣ – Alpha Chi Sigma, 1904 (PFA), chemistry (residential)
- ΦΔΧ – Phi Delta Chi, 1904 (PFA), co-ed pharmaceutical (residential)
- ΘΤ – Theta Tau, 1904 (PFA), engineering (residential)^{[pic1]}
- ΔΘΦ – Delta Theta Phi, 1905 (PFA), law
- Forestry Club, 1908, forestry
- ΦΔΚ – Phi Delta Kappa, 1910, education
- ΑΡΧ – Alpha Rho Chi, 1916–91, 2014 (PFA), architecture
- Society of Professional Journalists, 1916, journalism
- ΚΕ – Kappa Epsilon, 1920 (PFA), pharmaceutical
- ΦΧ – Phi Chi, 1920–1974, 1981, medical (residential)
- ΑΚΨ – Alpha Kappa Psi, 1921 (PFA), business (residential)
- ΚΨ – Kappa Psi, 1922 (PFA), pharmaceutical
- ΦΑΔ – Phi Alpha Delta, 1922 (PFA), pre-law
- ΚΗΚ – Kappa Eta Kappa, 1923 (PFA), co-ed electrical engineering, computer engineering or computer science (residential)
- ΦΔΕ – Phi Delta Epsilon, 1923 (PFA), Medical.
- ΔΣΠ – Delta Sigma Pi, 1924 (PFA), business
- ΓΗΓ – Gamma Eta Gamma, 1924, law (residential)^{[pic1]}
- ΣΑΙ – Sigma Alpha Iota, 1926 (PFA), women's, music
- Pershing Rifles, 1930 (PFA), military cadets
- ΣΔΕ – Sigma Delta Epsilon or GWIS, 1945, graduate women in science
- ΔΠΕ – Delta Pi Epsilon, 1951, business education, now part of National Business Education Association (NBEA).
- ΑΨ – Alpha Psi, 1956, veterinary medicine (residential)
- ΚΑΜ – Kappa Alpha Mu, 1957, photojournalism, dormant?
- ΔΘΣ – Delta Theta Sigma, 1958, agriculture (residential)
- ΠΣΕ – Pi Sigma Epsilon, 1962 (PFA), sales and marketing
- ΑΤΑ – Alpha Tau Alpha, 1963, agricultural education
- ΦΣΠ – Phi Sigma Pi, 2011 (PFA), leadership and scholarship

==== Chapters whose names changed ====
- ΑΡ – Alpha Rho Society, 1892–1898 (local), men's medical, became ΑΚΚ.
- ΠΚΤ – Pi Kappa Tau, 1896–97, medical (homeopathy), became ΦΑΓ (see ΦΧ).
- ΦΑΓ – Phi Alpha Gamma, 1897–1909, medical (homeopathy), became ΦΧ.
- ΦΔ – Phi Delta, 1904–1918, medicine, became ΘΚΨ (see ΦΒΠ).
- Society of Hammer and Tongs, 1904–1911, engineering, became ΘΤ
- ΦΧ – Phi Chi, 1904–1909, pharmacy, see ΦΔΧ.
- Berkshire Club, c.1904-1905, agricultural, became ΑΖ.
- ΔΦΔ – Delta Phi Delta, 1905–1913, law, see ΔΘΦ.
- ΣΚΑ – Sigma Kappa Alpha, 1908 (local), mining, see ΣΡ.
- ΘΚΨ – Theta Kappa Psi, 1908–1961, medicine, see ΦΒΠ.
- ΩΥΦ – Omega Upsilon Phi, 1908–34, medicine, see ΦΒΠ.
- ΑΚΦ – Alpha Kappa Phi, 1909–1913, law, see ΔΘΦ.
- ΤΒΦ – Tau Beta Phi, 1920-1922 (local), Jewish, men's dentistry, became ΑΩ.
- ΣΔΧ – Sigma Delta Chi, 1916–88, journalism, became the Society of Professional Journalists
- ΔΦ – Delta Phi, 1920–22 (local), women's architecture, see ΑΑΓ.
- Mitchell Club, 1922–23 (local), men's law, became ΦΑΔ.
- ΑΑΓ – Alpha Alpha Gamma, 1922–59+, women's architectural, see AWA+D.
- ΦΔΓ – Phi Delta Gamma, 1924–35, men's forensics, became ΤΚΑ.
- ΑΔΤ – Alpha Delta Tau, 1926–1944 (local), women's medical, see ΑΔΘ.
- ΙΡΧ – Iota Rho Chi, 1956-80+ (local), post-graduate Human Resources, see GSHRL or Graduate Society of Human Resources Leaders.

==== Dormant professional societies ====
- ΠΣ – Pi Sigma, 1894–1910? (local), engineering, dormant
- ΑΚΚ – Alpha Kappa Kappa, 1898–1980+, medicine, national disbanded
- ΘΕ – Theta Epsilon, 1900-1928+ (local), women's literary, dormant
- ΑΕΙ – Alpha Epsilon Iota, 1901–82, women's medical, dormant
- ΦΒΠ – Phi Beta Pi, 1904–70+, medicine, dormant
- ΑΖ – Alpha Zeta, 1905–73, agricultural, dormant
- ΞΨΦ – Xi Psi Phi, 1905–99, dentistry, dormant
- ΣΡ – Sigma Rho, 1910-1943+, mining, dormant
- ΑΚΣ – Alpha Kappa Sigma, 1911-1921+ (local), men's engineering, dormant
- ΖΚ- Zeta Kappa, 1914-19xx (local), men's dental, dormant
- CYMA, 1915-19xx, men's architecture, dormant
- ΓΑ – Gamma Alpha, 1915-1952+, interdisciplinary graduate students, dormant
- Cabletow, 1916-1924+, Masonic dental, dormant
- ΥΑ – Upsilon Alpha, 1918-1925+, graduate women's dental, dormant
- ΣΒΓ – Sigma Beta Gamma, 1920-25+ (local), women's business, dormant
- ΣΑΣ – Sigma Alpha Sigma, 1920–87? (local), Jewish, engineering, dormant
- ΒΔΦ – Beta Delta Phi, 1921-19xx (local), Jewish, men's dentistry, dormant
- ΠΔΝ – Pi Delta Nu, 1922–56, women's chemistry, dormant
- ΑΓΓ – Alpha Gamma Gamma, 1922-19xx (local), women's, dental nurses, dormant
- ΑΚΓ – Alpha Kappaamma, 1922–68+, women's, dental nurses, dormant
- ΑΩ – Alpha Omega, 1922-1968+ (PFA), Jewish, dentistry, dormant
- ΑΚΕ – Alpha Kappa Epsilon, 1923-19xx (local), women's, chemistry, dormant
- ΚΒΠ – Kappa Beta Pi, 1923–1958, women's law, dormant
- ΑΒΦ – Alpha Beta Phi, 1923–1958 (local?), Jewish, men's pharmacy, dormant
- ΑΔΖ – Alpha Delta Zeta, 1923-19xx (local), men's agricultural, dormant
- ΦΜΑ Sinfonia – Phi Mu Alpha Sinfonia, 1924–75 (NIMC), music focus, dormant
- ΦΒΓ – Phi Beta Gamma, 1925, law, dormant?
- Scarab, 1926-19xx, architecture, dormant
- ΤΦΔ – Tau Phi Delta (Treehouse), 1926–40+, forestry, dormant
- ΖΑΨ – Zeta Alpha Psi, before 1928-19xx (local), women's forensic, dormant
- Trowel, 1926-1929+, men's dentistry, dormant
- ΑΤΔ – Alpha Tau Delta, 1927–80+ (PFA), nursing, dormant
- ΜΦΕ – Mu Phi Epsilon, 1927–45 (PFA), music, dormant
- ΦΒ – Phi Beta, 1929-1980+ (PFA), creative and performing arts, dormant
- ΦΕΚ – Phi Epsilon Kappa, 1930–68+, physical education, health, sports management, dormant
- ΖΦΗ – Zeta Phi Eta, 1933–69 (PFA), communication arts and sciences, dormant
- ΜΒΧ – Mu Beta Chi, 1933–67 Jewish, men's business, dormant
- ΛΕΞ – Lambda Epsilon Xi, pre-1938-52+, Jewish men's law, dormant
- ΦΔ – Phi Delta (local?), 1938–80+, women's business, dormant
- Anchor & Chain, 1940–80+ (local), men's Naval ROTC midshipmen, dormant?
- ΑΕΡ – Alpha Epsilon Rho, 1943-1970+, electronic media and broadcast, dormant?
- ΣΠΩ – Sigma Pi Omega, 1940-1957+ (local), Jewish women's interprofessional, dormant
- ΑΔΘ – Alpha Delta Theta, 1944–75+, women's, medical technician and general sciences, dormant?
- ΦΧΗ – Phi Chi Eta, pre-1951-1955+ (local?), ROTC Quartermaster honors, dormant
- ΑΜΣ – Alpha Mu Sigma, 1952–75+ (local), men's applied mortuary science, dormant
- ΜΙΕ – Mu Iota Epsilon, before 1955-79+ (local), post-grad Industrial Education, dormant?
- ΣΑΗ – Sigma Alpha Eta, 1957–68+, co-ed speech and hearing pathologies, dormant
- ΑΑΘ – Alpha Alpha Theta, pre-1959-19xx?, women's medical terminology, dormant

=== Service societies ===
Listed with dates of local founding and national conference membership, if any, these are/were non-residential organizations designed to provide campus and community service. These organizations are self-governed.

==== Active service societies ====
- ΑΦΩ – Alpha Phi Omega, 1942–80, 2000–07, 2013– (PFA), service (co-ed)

==== Dormant service societies ====
- ΣΑΔ – Sigma Alpha Delta, 1894-1918+, upperclassman women's service organization, dormant
- Kawa Klub, 1907-19xx (local), junior and senior men's writing club
- Cap and Gown, 1908-19xx, senior women's service organization, "to promote friendship and class loyalty among senior women," dormant
- Pinafore, 1908-1942+, sophomore women's service organization, "for furthering class spirit and promoting Minnesota loyalty," dormant
- Tau Shonka, 1908-19xx, sophomore men's interfraternity service, dormant
- Styx, pre-1909-1911+ (local), men's service organization, dormant
- Tillikum Club, pre-1910-19xx, senior men's interfraternity service, dormant
- Triangle Club, pre-1910-19xx, freshmen men's interfraternity service, dormant
- Adelphian, pre-1910-19xx, junior men's interfraternity service organization, dormant
- Mitre, pre-1910-19xx (local), junior men's class organization, dormant
- Snake and Skull, pre-1910-19xx (local), sophomore men's class organization, dormant
- ΣΤ – Sigma Tau, pre-1911-19xx, senior women's service organization, dormant
- Tam O'Shanter, pre-1913-1942+, junior women's service organization, "to promote a feeling of friendship between the members of the classes," dormant
- Bib and Tucker, pre-1913-19xx, freshman women's service organization, "to foster class acquaintanceship," dormant
- Skin and Bones, 1915-19xx, senior women's class organization, dormant
- Skull and Crescent, 1915-19xx, junior men's service organization, dormant
- Hestian Club, 1921-19xx, women from outside the Twin Cities, dormant
- Yalomed Club, 1921-1926+, DeMolay-affiliated (Masonic) service club, dormant
- ΑΦΧ – Alpha Phi Chi, pre-1931-1966+, coordinated men's fraternal intramural sports, dormant
- ΠΦΧ – Pi Phi Chi, pre-1941-1965+ (local), inter-fraternity service for professional fraternities, dormant
- ΓΣΣ – Gamma Sigma Sigma, 1957–1972+ women's service organization, dormant

== Religious fraternities and sororities ==
Primarily active during the 1940s and 1950s, these groups were formed in response to student interest in an association with peers of the same faith tradition. Some were local organizations, some national. Some were residential, and all were co-ed unless noted. Note that some religious-themed and residential fraternities and sororities are listed under the academic and social groups by their choice. Many other religious-oriented groups on campus are not designed to resemble fraternities and are not listed here. Groups are listed by date of local founding.

=== Active religious service societies ===
- Hillel Society, 1940, Jewish (co-ed)
- ΚΠΑ – Kappa Pi Alpha, 2003, Christian (co-ed and residential)

=== Dormant religious service societies ===
- Menorah Society, 1903-1931+, Jewish Service, merged with Hillel Society
- Newman Club, 1903–1968+, Catholic co-ed service, dormant
- ΚΦ – Kappa Phi, 1919–1980+, Methodist and Episcopal women's service, dormant
- Wesley Foundation, 1920-1968+, Methodist co-ed service, dormant
- Northrop Club, 1920-1944+ (local), Congregational women's service, dormant
- ΚΚΛ – Kappa Kappa Lambda, 1921–1968+ (local), Lutheran (~ELCA) women's service, dormant
- ΧΚΑ – Chi Kappa Alpha, 1925–1928, Presbyterian, dormant
- ΦΤΘ – Phi Tau Theta, 1925–1951 (became ΣΘΕ), Men's Methodist service, dormant
- ΦΧΔ – Phi Chi Delta, 1926-1952+ (local?), Presbyterian and Congregational women's service, dormant
- Folwell Club, 1929-19xx (local), Co-ed Episcopal service, dormant
- ΓΔ – Gamma Delta, 1935–1969, Lutheran (Missouri Synod) service; today, see University Lutheran Chapel and Luther House
- Kadimah Society, 1937-1943+ (local), Zionist society, dormant
- Canterbury Club, 1941-1959+ (local?), Episcopal co-ed service, dormant
- ΔΚΦ – Delta Kappa Phi, 1942–1966+ (local), Lutheran (~ELCA) men's service, residential for a short time, dormant
