= Phi Gamma Delta Fraternity House (University of Minnesota) =

- U.S. National Register of Historic Places
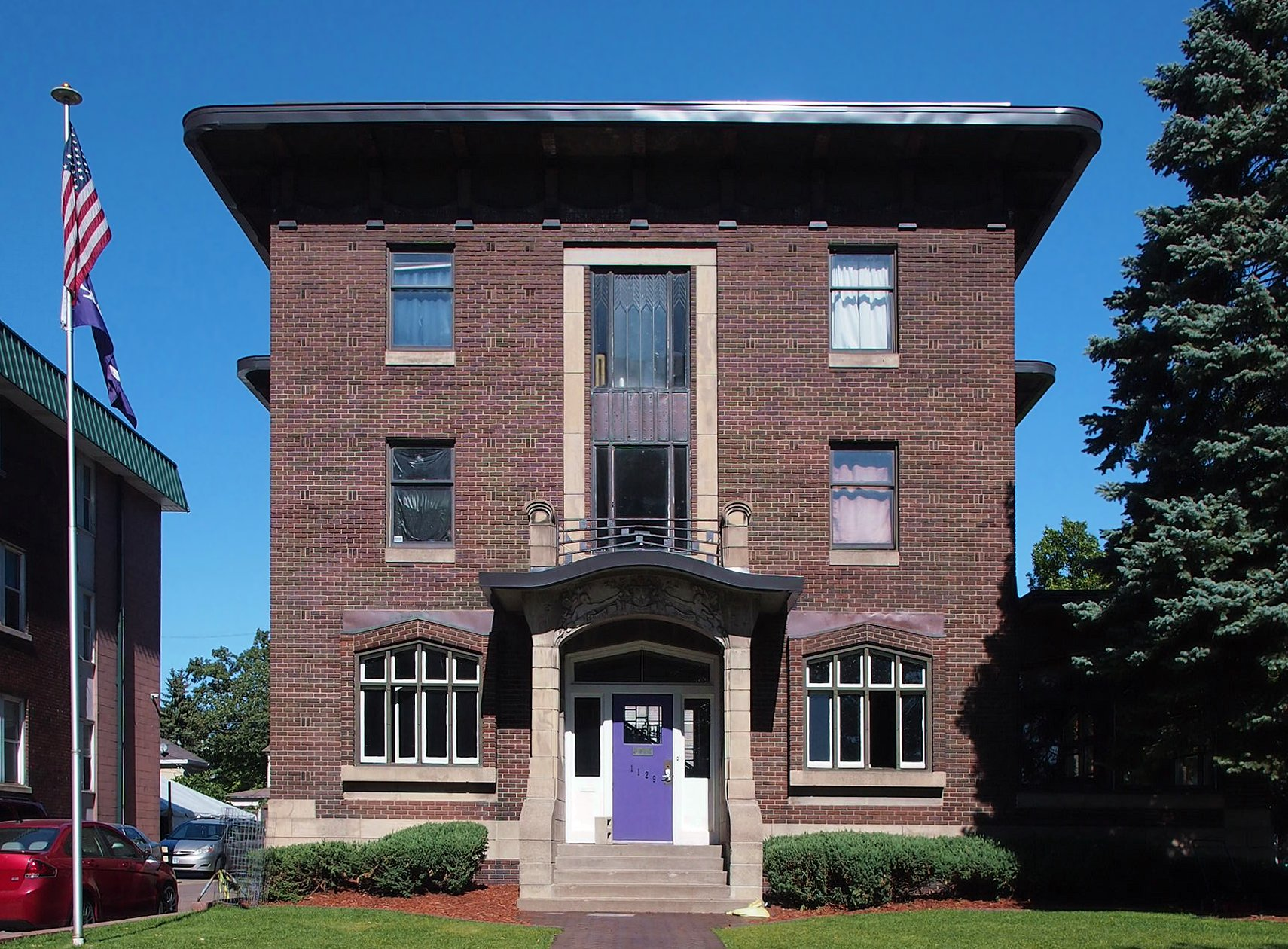
- The Phi Gamma Delta Fraternity House from the southwest

- Location within Minnesota Location within the United States
- Location: 1129 University Ave. SE, Minneapolis, Minnesota
- Coordinates: 44°58′52″N 93°14′21″W
- Built: 1912
- Architect: Stravs, Carl B.; Madsen Bros.
- Architectural style: Bungalow/Craftsman, Art Nouveau
- NRHP reference No.: 05001040
- Added to NRHP: September 15, 2005

The Phi Gamma Delta Fraternity House in Minneapolis, Minnesota is the University of Minnesota chapter house of Phi Gamma Delta. The house, located just across University Avenue from the East Bank Campus, is listed on the National Register of Historic Places for its distinctive architecture, as well as its role in the development of fraternity housing in Minnesota.

== History ==
The Phi Gamma Delta chapter house, like many other fraternities adjacent to the U of M campus, is part of a "fraternity row" along University Avenue, and was part of a first wave of fraternity house construction between 1900 and 1917. Most of these houses featured prominent entries, with a porch or terrace, and had large living rooms and chapter meeting rooms on the first floor. Individual students usually had rooms on the second and third floors of these houses. The Phi Gamma Delta chapter house, besides being listed on the National Register, is part of the Minneapolis Heritage Preservation Commission's University of Minnesota Greek Letter Chapter House Historic District.

== Design ==
The house is a unique example of the Vienna Secession movement, making it unusual during a time when other fraternity houses were being designed with Classical Revival and other period revival architectural styles. The architect, Carl Stravs, used Vienna Secession features such as the overhanging roof slab with a rounded edge, pentagonal window openings on the ground floor, and decorations integrated with the main concrete structure. The living room on the first floor has a stone fireplace on the west wall, which Stravs called, "the center of all the social life in the fraternity house". The fireplace is built in rusticated limestone said to be salvaged from the university's Old Main building, which was destroyed by a fire in 1904. The wall has niches housing the busts of Greek philosophers, which were also reportedly salvaged from Old Main.

Stravs used reinforced concrete to provide fireproof construction. He also did this in accordance with his design principle for the building, which was, "to provide the most economical, simple and substantial rooming for the use of the junior members of the fraternity, with the least amount of space wasted." Thus, the heavy concrete piers and columns in the 35 feet (11 m) by 30 feet (9.1 m) living room are designed simply, without much ornamentation. The second and third floors each contained five bedrooms, with shared bathroom facilities.

== See also ==
- List of Fraternities and Sororities at the University of Minnesota
- North American fraternity and sorority housing
