= Lutheran Student Movement – USA =

Organization for Lutheran students in higher education

LSM-USA

The Lutheran Student Movement - United States of America (LSM-USA) is a student-led organization of Lutheran college students. The movement's staff and resources are housed at the Churchwide Office of the Evangelical Lutheran Church in America in Chicago, Illinois.

== History ==
LSM-USA was founded when two Lutheran college organizations, the Lutheran Student Association of America (LSAA, founded in 1922) and Gamma Delta (founded in 1928), merged in 1969 while gathered in convention in Boulder, Colorado. LSM-USA assumed LSAA's position in the World Student Christian Federation.

Since its inception, LSM-USA has maintained the idea of being a pan-Lutheran organization. Until 1985, LSM-USA was supported and sponsored by the American Lutheran Church (ALC), the Lutheran Church in America (LCA), the Association of Evangelical Lutheran Churches (AELC), and the Lutheran Church – Missouri Synod (LCMS).

In 1984, the organization Lutherans Concerned/North America (LC/NA) began the Reconciling in Christ movement. This movement seeks Lutheran bodies that declare themselves accepting and affirming of all members of the body of Christ, regardless of ethnicity, age, or sexuality. LSM-USA became the first Lutheran organization to declare itself as Reconciling in Christ. As a result, the LCMS withdrew its support for LSM-USA in 1985, citing LSM-USA's decision to declare itself a Reconciling in Christ organization as well as other doctrinal disagreements. The LCMS then formed its own organization, the Lutheran Student Fellowship.

In 1988 the ALC, the LCA, and the AELC merged to form the Evangelical Lutheran Church in America (ELCA), thus reducing the number of sponsoring bodies to one. However, LSM-USA remains open to all Lutherans.

In 2004, LSM-USA entered into a full ministry partnership with Lutheran Youth Encounter.

In 2007, LSM-USA began formal discussion of entering into a full partnership with the ELCA. In 2009, the Legislative Assembly voted to pursue a formal partnership with the ELCA as long as it retained its student-led structure and its Reconciling in Christ status. Additionally, at the 2008–2009 gathering, the assembly moved to change the Secretary of International and Multicultural Concerns position into a new position called the Advocate for Diversity and Service Learning.

After the 2009 gathering, the organization entered a period of dormancy due to economic hardships and reemerged in 2014 with new gatherings. There were gatherings yearly between 2015 and 2019. The COVID-19 pandemic forced the gatherings to go virtual from 2020 to 2022. In 2023, LSM-USA celebrated 100 years in ministry with a national gathering in Chicago, Illinois.

== Structure ==
LSM-USA is a self-governing student organization within the ELCA. A national council, made up of sixteen elected voting members and five non-voting members, meets throughout year to oversee organizational business and allow for council members to support one another in their ministry. The council consists of the president; the vice president, who also serves as the LSM-USA liaison to the ELCA's Lutheran Youth Organization (LYO); the Advocate for Diversity and Service Learning; an intern, who is a non-voting member paid by the ELCA; presidents of the thirteen different regions; a web specialist; a liaison from the board of the LYO; and a national staff advisor, usually the campus minister of a university-based Lutheran campus ministry.

Decision-making authority rests first with the body of LSM-USA gathered annually in plenary sessions at the national gathering; then with the national council when it gathers in session twice annually; and finally with the three national officers in between those meetings. National officers are elected at the national gathering by all present voting members, while regional officers are elected individually by their regions at different points throughout the year. All elected members of the national council serve one-year calendar year terms. Other work of the organization is often done through specially designated ad hoc committees that are filled by students and campus ministry advisors who are selected through an application process involving review by the national officers, and who report to the national council, from which they derive their constitutional authority.

=== Regional breakdown ===
Regions of LSM-USA

- ALTO - Arkansas, Louisiana, Texas, Oklahoma
- Blue Ridge - North Carolina, Tennessee, Virginia
- Central - Kansas, Missouri, Nebraska
- Desert Southwest - Arizona, New Mexico, Western Texas, Southwest Colorado, and south Nevada
- Gulf Atlantic (GALSM) - Alabama, Florida, Georgia, Mississippi, South Carolina
- IMOK - Indiana, Michigan, Ohio, Kentucky
- Mid-Atlantic (MALSM) - Delaware, Maryland, New Jersey, Pennsylvania, West Virginia, and the District of Columbia
- Northeast (NELSM) - Connecticut, Maine, Massachusetts, New Hampshire, New York, Rhode Island, Vermont
- Pacific Northwest (PAC-NW) - Alaska, Idaho, Montana, Oregon, Washington
- Pacific Southwest (PAC-SW) - California, Hawaii, Nevada
- Rocky Mountain (RMR) - Colorado, Utah, Wyoming
- Tri-Ota - Minnesota, North Dakota, South Dakota
- Central Midwest - Illinois, Iowa, Wisconsin, and the upper peninsula of Michigan

=== National Gathering ===
The National Gathering is held once a year over New Year's Day. Gatherings have been held in Chicago; New Orleans; Phoenix; Washington, D.C.; Houston; San Diego; and Denver.

The national gathering is organized with the institutional and financial support of the ELCA because of the inability of an organization of college students such as LSM-USA to effectively negotiate with hotels and other vendors in the necessary ways. Acknowledging this vital support, the gathering is convened by the ELCA and Lutheran Student Movement – USA under the authority of the national council and is planned by a student committee with campus ministry advisers. Events at the gathering include worship, workshops, concerts, meals, dances, speakers, service projects, and plenary sessions.

=== Alternative spring break ===
In 2006, an annual alternative week-long spring break event, known as Breaking Out!, was instituted by LSM-USA. The event consists of service projects, theological education, social-ministry training, small group discussion, and community worship.

Breaking Out! was originally envisioned as three separate weeks for up to thirty students each. A challenge grant from Thrivent Financial for Lutherans provides financial support for students to participate in the program. The inaugural event was held in Atlanta on March 19–25, 2006.

The event is overseen by two committees of students: a planning committee, chaired by a student who participated in the previous year's event, and includes the president and intern of LSM as de facto members; and a fundraising committee, which is also chaired by a student from the previous year, and includes the secretary of LSM as a de facto member. These committees are responsible for planning the event and for selecting the participants from among the applicants. The planning committee generally does not accept more than two people from any single college or university.

Following the devastation of Hurricane Katrina in August 2005, the 2007 planning committee chose the town of Ocean Springs, Mississippi, as the site for Breaking Out! 2007. The event was held March 11–16, 2007.

The 2008 event to be held in Washington, D.C., was canceled due to lack of participation.

In 2009, LSM-USA leadership began a partnership with Lutheran Disaster Response (LDR) and its current What a Relief program. This partnership emerged to become a new program called Alternative Spring Break 2009. LSM-USA provided funds and service-learning workbooks to campus ministries, while LDR organized the locations for relief efforts. The ELCA provided the majority of coordination efforts for this project.

In 2010, the ELCA decided to expand the Alternative Spring Break program to incorporate other ministries around the United States and abroad. LSM-USA was asked and decided to provide grants for student ministries to participate in a service-learning institute, which provided resources and time for discussion for leaders prior to their trips. These leaders were charged with disseminating the information from the institute to their students and leaders. The student group would then apply what they learned through the institute and on their trip.
