= Alpha Delta Theta (professional) =

American professional sorority for medical technology

- ΑΔΘ
- Founded: February 1, 1944; 82 years ago: University of Minnesota; Marquette University
- Type: Professional
- Former affiliation: PFA; PPA
- Status: Active
- Emphasis: Medical technology
- Scope: National
- Member badge
- Colors: Green and Gold
- Flower: Daffodil
- Publication: The Scope
- Chapters: 1 active
- Headquarters: Philadelphia, Pennsylvania; United States

Alpha Delta Theta (ΑΔΘ) is an American professional fraternity in the field of medical technology, initially for women. It was formed in 1944 by the merger of two local sororities at the University of Minnesota and Marquette University, Previously a national organization, it now operates as a local fraternity at the University of the Sciences in Philadelphia, Pennsylvania.

== History ==
Predecessor ΑΔΤ's pin was adopted by the new organization, after switching the Τ for a Θ

Alpha Delta Theta was established on February 1, 1944 by two local sororities, Alpha Delta Tau of the University of Minnesota, formed in 1926, and Tau Sigma of Marquette University, formed in 1942. It was founded to unite all women entering into or engaging in the field of medical technology, to promote social and intellectual fellowship among its members, and to raise the prestige of medical technologists by inspiring the members to greater group and individual effort.

Though the Minnesota group was sixteen years older, the Marquette chapter was designated as the Alpha chapter and the Minnesota group as the Beta chapter. The fraternity held its first national convention in November 1944. By October 1948, it had chartered eight chapters.

Alpha Delta Theta joined the Professional Panhellenic Association in 1952. It became a charter member of the Professional Fraternity Association in 1978.

As of 2025, Alpha Iota chapter at University of the Sciences in Philadelphia is still active.

== Symbols ==
Alpha Delta Theta's badge is six-sided with a black background that bears the Greek letters of ΑΔΘ. The fraternity's colors are the "green (of medicine) and gold (of science)." Its flower is the daffodil. Its biannual publication is The Scope.

== Chapters ==
Alpha Delta Thera established both collegiate and graduate/alumni chapters. In the following list of collegiate chapters, active chapters are in bold and inactive chapters and institutions are in italics.

Chapter	Charter date and range	Institution	Location	Status	Ref.
Alpha	February 1, 1944 – December 1974	Marquette University	Milwaukee, Wisconsin	Inactive	(Note: Chapter formed from Tau Sigma (local), established in 1942.)
Beta	1944–1975+?	University of Minnesota	Minneapolis, Minnesota	Inactive	(Note: Chapter formed from Alpha Delta Tau (local), established in 1926.)
Gamma	1945–19xx ?	Macalester College	Saint Paul, Minnesota	Inactive	
Delta	1945–19xx ?	Michigan State University	East Lansing, Michigan	Inactive	
Epsilon	1946–19xx ?	University of Wisconsin–Madison	Madison, Wisconsin	Inactive	
Zeta	1946–19xx ?	Kansas State University	Manhattan, Kansas	Inactive	
Eta	1948–19xx ?	Indiana University Bloomington	Bloomington, Indiana	Inactive	
Theta	1948–19xx ?	College of St. Scholastica	Duluth, Minnesota	Inactive	
Iota	1948–19xx ?	Mount Mary University	Milwaukee, Wisconsin	Inactive	
Kappa	1949–19xx ?	University of Wyoming	Laramie, Wyoming	Inactive	
Lambda	1950–19xx ?	Wayne State University	Detroit, Michigan	Inactive	
Mu	1950–19xx ?	University of Colorado (probably Anschutz)	Aurora, Colorado	Inactive	
Nu	1951–19xx ?	Saint Louis University	St. Louis, Missouri	Inactive	
Xi	1952–19xx ?	University of Denver	Denver, Colorado	Inactive	
Omicron	1953–19xx ?	Marycrest College	Davenport, Iowa	Inactive	(Note: The college closed in 2002.)
Pi	1954–19xx ?	University of North Dakota	Grand Forks, North Dakota	Inactive	
Rho	1954–19xx ?	College of Saint Teresa	Winona, Minnesota	Inactive	(Note: College closed in 1989.)
Sigma	1956–19xx ?	Augsburg University	Minneapolis, Minnesota	Inactive	
Tau	1957–19xx ?	West Virginia University	Morgantown, West Virginia	Inactive	
Upsilon	1959–19xx ?	Ohio State University	Columbus, Ohio	Inactive	
Phi	1960–19xx ?	Temple University	Philadelphia, Pennsylvania	Inactive	
Chi	1961–19xx ?	University of Wisconsin–Oshkosh	Oshkosh, Wisconsin	Inactive	
Psi	1961–19xx ?	Marian University	Fond du Lac, Wisconsin	Inactive	
Omega	1961–19xx ?	University of Detroit Mercy	Detroit, Michigan	Inactive	
Alpha Alpha	1962–19xx ?	University at Albany, SUNY	Albany, New York	Inactive	
Alpha Beta	1962–19xx ?	St. John's University	New York City, New York	Inactive	
Alpha Gamma	1963–19xx ?	Edgewood College	Madison, Wisconsin	Inactive	
Alpha Delta	1963–19xx	Loyola University New Orleans	New Orleans, Louisiana	Inactive	
Alpha Epsilon	1965–19xx ?	University of Wisconsin–Milwaukee	Madison, Wisconsin	Inactive	
Alpha Zeta				Unassigned	
Alpha Eta	1965–19xx ?	St. Norbert College	De Pere, Wisconsin	Inactive	
Alpha Theta	1966–19xx ?	Drake University	Des Moines, Iowa	Inactive	
**Alpha Iota**	1967	University of the Sciences	Philadelphia, Pennsylvania	Active	(Note: A reference note at List of fraternities and sororities at the University of Minnesota citing a no-longer working reference says that the Alpha Iota chapter was the only surviving chapter.)
Alpha Kappa	1967–19xx ?	University of Wisconsin–Superior	Superior, Wisconsin	Inactive	
Alpha Lambda	1967–19xx ?	University of Massachusetts Amherst	Amherst, Massachusetts	Inactive	
Alpha Mu	1969–19xx ?	University of Dayton	Dayton, Ohio	Inactive	
Alpha Nu	1969–19xx ?	Xavier University of Louisiana	New Orleans, Louisiana	Inactive	

== See also ==
- Professional fraternities and sororities
