= Lutheran Student Fellowship =

American campus ministry organization

Lutheran Student Fellowship (LSF) was a campus ministry organization of the Lutheran Church–Missouri Synod (LCMS). It was founded in 1987 and dissolved in 2013, at which time its functions were absorbed into the synod's new campus ministry organization, LCMS U.

== History ==
Lutheran Student Fellowship was formed by a resolution of the 1987 Synodical Convention of the LCMS in Indianapolis, Indiana, in order to serve as a "vehicle for the promotion campus ministry particularly in the more than 600 town-gown and contact campus congregations where a "full-time" campus pastor is not presently available."

Ministry to college students, however, was something that the LCMS had long been concerned about. Starting in 1928, an LCMS student organization named Gamma Delta was formed as a "Student District of the Walther League". The purpose of the organization was to serve college and university students as an extension of the Walther League, the youth organization of the LCMS at that time.

In 1968, anticipating the union of several Lutheran church bodies in the United States and the uniting of Lutheran campus ministries, the national officers of Gamma Delta voted to disband their organization in favor of a new pan-Lutheran organization, the Lutheran Student Movement. This new organization, founded in 1969, would serve Lutheran students from both Gamma Delta and the Lutheran Student Association of America of the American Lutheran Church and Lutheran Church in America.

The creation of Lutheran Student Movement was not supported by everyone in LCMS campus ministries. Since the 1970s efforts were made to establish another distinct student organization for the LCMS. During 1985 more than 30 LCMS campus ministries and four District Conventions called for the Synod to establish a new student organization. The 1987 Synod Convention in Indianapolis, Indiana, responded by creating Lutheran Student Fellowship.

The 2012-2013 school year was the last year that the LSF operated. At that time the LCMS created a new organization called "LCMS U" to serve college students.

== Organization ==
Lutheran Student Fellowship was organized into twelve regions to facilitate activity planning and growth. Regions normally conducted their own retreats, gatherings, and events. Each region had a regional representative to the national body. Regional representatives elected national officers.

Regions of LSF and the states they served

- Region 1 - Washington, Oregon, Idaho, Montana, and Alaska
- Region 2 - California, Nevada, Arizona, and Hawaii
- Region 3 - Colorado, Wyoming, Western Nebraska, Utah, and New Mexico
- Region 4 - North Dakota, South Dakota, and Minnesota
- Region 5 - Central and Eastern Nebraska, Kansas, and Oklahoma
- Region 6 - Texas
- Region 7 - Wisconsin, Iowa, and Northern Illinois
- Region 8 - Missouri and Southern Illinois
- Region 9 - Michigan, Indiana, Ohio, and West Virginia
- Region 10 - Kentucky, Tennessee, Arkansas, Mississippi, Alabama, Florida Panhandle, and Louisiana
- Region 11 - Maine, Vermont, New Hampshire, New Jersey, Massachusetts, Rhode Island, New York, Connecticut, and Pennsylvania.
- Region 12 - Delaware, Maryland, Virginia, North Carolina, South Carolina, Georgia, and most of Florida
