= Asian Americans in California =

Ethnic group in the US

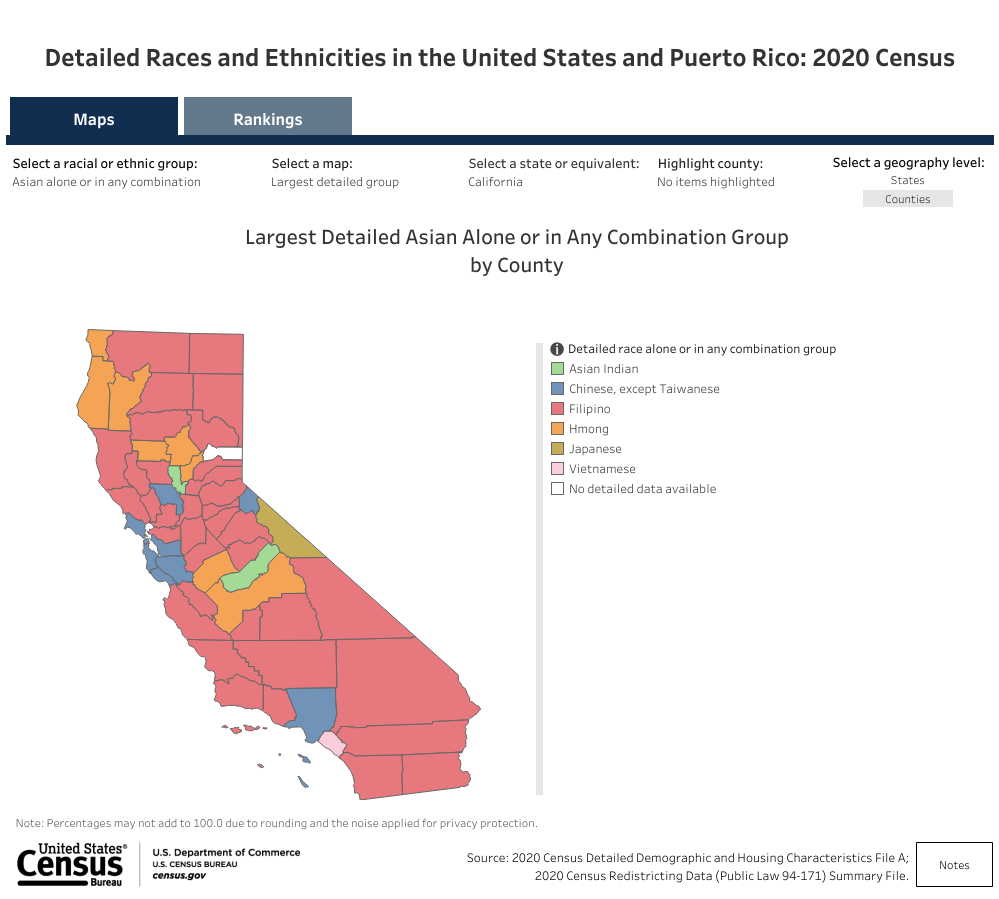

Total population
- 7,045,163, 20% (Alone and in combination, 2024)

Regions with significant populations
- San Francisco Bay Area: Fremont, San Mateo County, San Francisco, San Jose/Santa Clara County areas
- Los Angeles County/Southern California: Irvine and Westminster, Orange County; San Gabriel Valley, West Los Angeles

Languages
- English, Spanish Chinese, Tagalog, Vietnamese, Hindustani, Korean, Japanese, Khmer, Hmong, Thai, Lao, other Languages of Asia

Religion
- Protestantism, Catholicism, Buddhism, Hinduism, Islam, Sikhism, Irreligion, Others

Related ethnic groups
- Asian Americans

Asian Californians are residents of the state of California who are of Asian ancestry. California has the largest Asian American population in the United States, and second highest proportion of Asian American residents, after Hawaii. As of the 2020 US census, there were over 6 million Asian Americans in California; 15.5% of the state's population. If including those with partial Asian ancestry, this figure is around 17%. This is a jump from 13.8% recorded in 2010.

The largest Asian American ethnic subgroups in California are Chinese Americans, Filipino Americans, Indian Americans, and Vietnamese Americans. Asian Americans in California are concentrated in the San Francisco-San José and Los Angeles metropolitan areas.

== Background ==
Including those with partial Asian ancestry, the following Asian ethnic groups in California are: Filipino (3.9%, 1,474,707), Chinese (except Taiwanese; 3.6%, 1,349,111), Vietnamese (858,589, 1.7%), Indian (666,445, 1.5%), Koreans (505,225, 1.3%), Japanese (428,014, 1.1%), Taiwanese (109,928, 0.2%), Cambodians (102,317, 0.2%), Hmong (91,224, 0.2%), Laotians (69,303, 0.2%), Thai (67,707, 0.1%), Pakistanis (53,474, 0.1%), Indonesians (39,506, 0.1%), Burmese (17,978, 0.05%), Sri Lankans (11,929, 0.03%), Bangladeshis (10,494, 0.03%), Nepalese (6,231, 0.01%), Malaysians (5,595, 0.01%), Mongolians (4,993, 0.1%), Singaporeans (1,513, 0.004%), Okinawans (1,377, 0.003%), and Bhutanese (750, 0.001%).

=== Economical ===
Asians have the highest income per capita in the US, and may have a slightly above average rate in California. However, income average varies with Asian groups, from Cambodians and Hmong to Taiwanese and Indians.

Asians make up approximately 2-4% of homeless in California, which is low, but communities exist especially in San Francisco and San Jose.

While a large proportion of Asian Americans have higher educational attainments and median income averages, many Asian American groups, often those coming from low-income Southeast Asian families, face hardships such as poverty, depression, emotional and domestic abuse, racial bullying, and gang violence. Cambodian and Southeast Asian-dominant street gangs such as the Asian Boyz, which is an off-shoot of the African American and Los Angeles based Crips gang, formed in Los Angeles County the late 1970s to the 1980s during the Cambodian refuge migration to the US, especially in Long Beach, Fresno, Sacramento, Oakland, St. Paul, Minnesota, and Lowell, Massachusetts.

Often, these gangs would fight with Hispanic gangs but would eventually shift into fighting with fellow Cambodia and Asian gang members, mostly with rival Asian gangs or criminals/dealers. This violence over drugs, turf, and arguments would sometimes lead to violence and murders, and violence involving innocent children and families during home invasions have been reported in the San Bernardino area in the 1990s and elsewhere.

=== Education ===
Asian Americans and immigrants have a high student body percentage among many California colleges; UC Berkeley is about 40% Asian.

== Ethnic groups ==
=== Cambodian ===
There are many Cambodians in Long Beach, Stockton, and Fresno. Long Beach is 4% Cambodian with over 20,000 people of Cambodian residents. There is a Cambodiatown in LB. There is a Cambodian population in Oakland, and there were, and to a lesser extent today, Cambodian communities in Tenderloin, San Francisco.

=== Chinese ===
San Francisco is 21.4% Chinese, and the San Francisco Bay Area is 8% Chinese. Many of the Chinese Americans are Cantonese-speaking immigrants or descendants from Guangdong province and Hong Kong. There are also many Taiwanese and mainland Chinese immigrants in the Silicon Valley area.

The Bay Area in general is 8-9% Chinese. Many live in Santa Clara County, with many prevalent in Cupertino, Sunnyvale, and Milpitas. In the East Bay, many in San Ramon, Dublin, Pleasanton, Oakland, Walnut Creek, and Piedmont. Berkeley has many Chinese in the area; UC Berkeley is about 20% Chinese. On the Peninsula, there are many Chinese Americans in Daly City, San Mateo, San Bruno, and Foster City.

Northern California and America at large's Chinese population largely originated in the Taishan area, with at least half of Chinese Americans in the 1980s reporting some or all Taishanese ancestry. Nearby cities such as Zhongshan had larger emigration waves to the US and/or California. There were also some Shanghainese immigrants coming into the Bay Area to a lesser extent during the 70s-80s.

Sacramento is 3-5% Chinese. Davis has many Asian American residents and students at UC Davis. Elk Grove has a Chinese community.

Los Angeles is 1.8% Chinese, and Los Angeles County is 4% Chinese. A large portion of the Chinese population resides in the San Gabriel Valley. Areas with notable Chinese and Chinese-American populations include Chinatown, parts of San Fernando Valley, and Westwood in Los Angeles, the San Gabriel Valley, the 626 (Arcadia, Alhambra, El Monte, Monterey Park, Rosemead, San Gabriel, Temple City), Rowland Heights, Diamond Bar, Hacienda Heights, and the Los Angeles County/Orange County border cities of Cerritos and Artesia. Chinatown in Los Angeles is populated by mostly working-class Cantonese and mainland Chinese while the western San Gabriel Valley has a diverse Chinese population. Rowland Heights and the Eastern San Gabriel Valley is mainly populated by Taiwanese. In Orange County, Irvine has a large Chinese population.

San Diego has Chinese communities in Torrey Pines and Ranchos Peñasquitos, and there are sizeable numbers in other County cities such as Carlsbad and Poway.

=== Filipino ===
The majority of Filipinos in California reside in the Greater Los Angeles area. According to a 2013 study, there are 1.5 million Filipino Americans in California, making them one of the largest Asian ethnic groups in the state. Since 2018 the population has grown to 1.6 million according to some sources.

=== Hmong ===
As of the 2010 census, a little over 91,000 Hmong live in California alone, out of the total 260,000 in the country. They mainly live in Fresno, Merced, Sacramento, and Stockton areas.

=== Indian ===
The San Francisco Bay Area is home to the second largest Indian-American population in the United States. Many are primarily concentrated in the Santa Clara Valley and the Tri-Valley in Alameda County. Indians began migrating to Northern California in the early 20th century, but Indians would arrive in much greater numbers after immigration quotas were lifted along with the growth of the high tech sector. Kamala Harris, former Vice President of the United States, is of Indian origin and was born in Oakland, CA.

Yuba City, which has a significant Sikh community, draws thousands of visitors annually for its Sikh Parade.

Southern California is also home to a significant Indian-American population. Over 150,000 Indian Americans live in the greater Los Angeles area.

=== Indonesian ===
Los Angeles, California is home to the largest population of Indonesians in America, with Riverside, California having the second largest population.

=== Japanese ===
California contains five of the top 10 metropolitan cities with the greatest Japanese population in the United States. Los Angeles, San Francisco, San Jose, San Diego, and Sacramento have the largest Japanese populations in California, with Los Angeles having more than the other cities combined.

There are several areas of California that held assembly centers and internment camps (also known as relocation centers) where Japanese Americans were forced to relocate to after the Attack on Pearl Harbor, such as Arcadia(Santa Anita Racetrack), Fresno(Fresno Fairgrounds), Arboga, Merced, Owens Valley(Manzanar War Relocation Center), Pinedale(Pinedale, California), Pomona(Fairplex), Sacramento(Camp Kohler), Salinas(California Rodeo Salinas), San Bruno(Tanforan), Stockton, California(San Joaquin County Fairgrounds), Tulare, Turlock(Stanislaus County Fairgrounds), and Woodland. The Tule Lake War Relocation Center in Modoc County was the biggest of the 10 internment camps in its prime.

=== Korean ===
Koreans make up 16% of the Asian Pacific Islander (API) community in Los Angeles County, the highest percentage in the entire country. In the API community of California, Koreans comprise 9% of the population, but only 1% of the total population.

There are many Koreans in Fullerton and Irvine in Orange County, and a significant community in Cupertino, Santa Clara and San Francisco.

=== Laotian ===
California is the top state in the country with the largest Laotian population, which as of 2015 is 271,000 across the country. Among the population of Laotians, Hmong people are counted as well. They are mostly in Northern and Central California, in Oakland, Richmond, Fresno, Sacramento, and Stockton. There are some in Southeast San Diego.

=== Malaysian ===
Los Angeles is second to New York in terms of Malay population, however the combined population of Malay in Los Angeles and San Francisco is equal to New York.

=== Taiwanese ===
Los Angeles is home to the largest percentage of Taiwanese Americans in the country. There is a Little Taipei, and Hacienda Heights and Monterey Park both have large Taiwanese communities.

=== Thai ===
California possesses the largest Thai population outside of Asia, and is the only state in the country that has a designated "Thai Town," which is also the first of its kind globally.

Of the 5.6 million Asian people in California, approximately 68,000 are Thai, which is 28.5% of the entire Thai population in the United States.

=== Vietnamese ===
Totally (647,589, 1.7%) Vietnamese in California .

San Jose is 10% Vietnamese, and the San Francisco Bay Area has a sizable Vietnamese population. Other areas of Santa Clara County like Milpitas, and Alameda County’s Fremont is home to many. Chinatown, San Francisco and Tenderloin, San Francisco have communities.

Orange County has a large Vietnamese population, with much of the population in Garden Grove and Westminster, which contains a Little Saigon. There are also smaller but significant Vietnamese communities in Anaheim and Santa Ana in Orange County.

There is a Vietnamese population in San Diego County. Little Saigon, San Diego in City Heights has a Vietnamese community, and they can be found in Ranchos Peñasquitos.

== Demographics ==
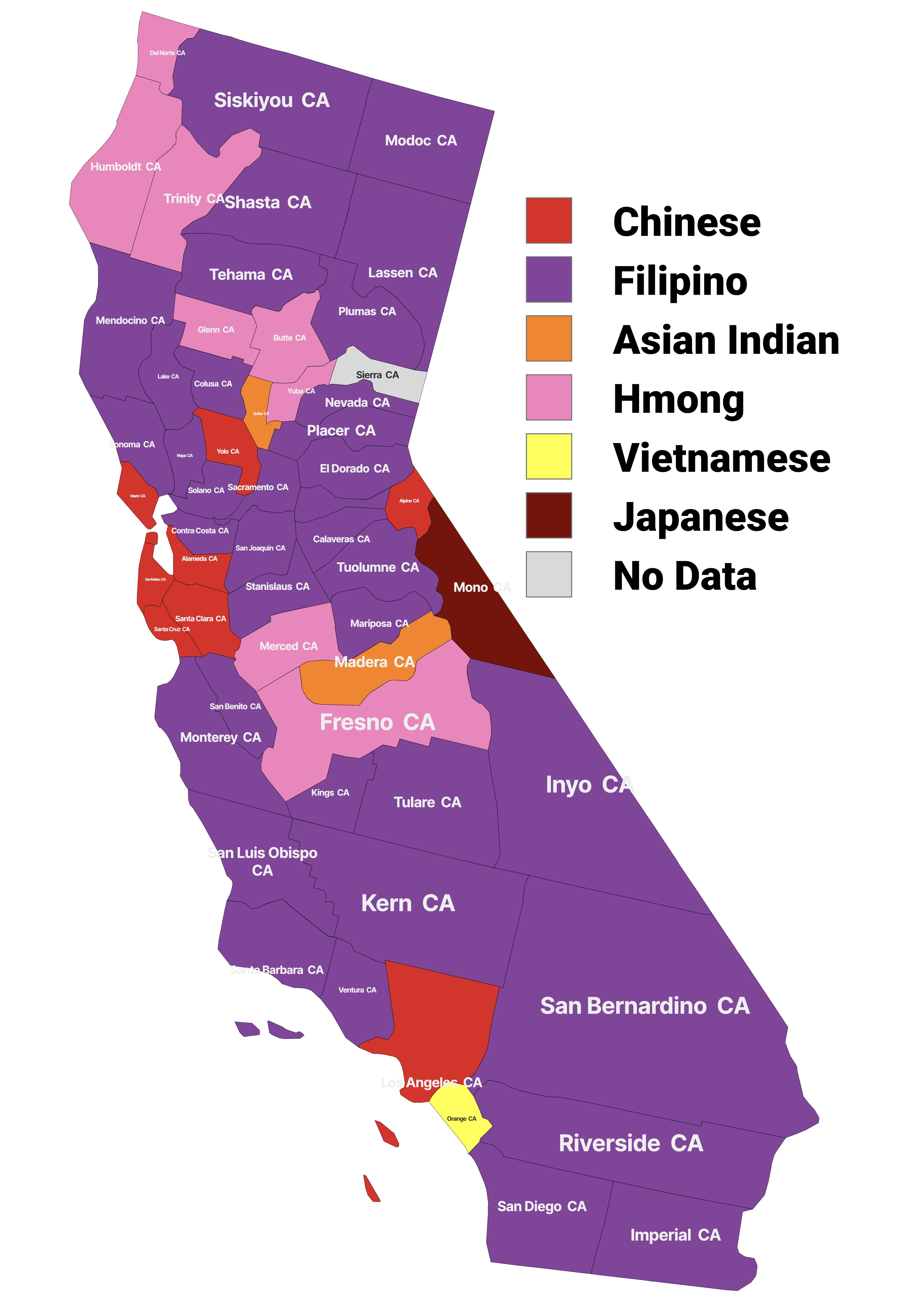
Largest Asian alone or in any combination ancestry by county in California, per the 2020 census

Ancestry by origin	Number	%
(China) Chinese	1,349,111	
(Philippines) Filipino	1,474,707	
(India) Indian	924,630	
(Vietnam) Vietnamese	858,043	
(Korea) Korean	472,787	
(Japan) Japanese	238,913	
(Taiwan) Taiwanese	116,422	
(Cambodia) Cambodian	92,953	
(Pakistan) Pakistani	82,851	
(Laos) Laotian	56,678	
(Thailand) Thai	54,688	
(Indonesia) Indonesian	28,980	
(Myanmar) Burmese	22,472	
(Nepal) Nepalese	20,566	
(Bangladesh) Bangladeshi	15,529	
(Sri Lanka) Sri Lankan	14,435	
(Mongolia) Mongolian	13,523	
(Malaysia) Malaysian	6,082	
(Bhutan) Bhutanese	301	

Racial or Ethnic group	2000	2010	2020
Asian	10.9%	13.0%	15.5%
Total Population

== Notable people ==
This is a list of notable people of Asian descent who were born in, raised in, or spent a significant amount of time in California. Because each field includes a large number of individuals, only a selected portion of representative figures is listed.

=== Art and design ===
- David Choe
- Gyo Obata

==== Fashion ====
- Chanel Iman
- Peter Som
- Alexander Wang

=== Business ===
- Johnny Kan
- Kevin Tsujihara
- William Wang

=== Culinary ===
- Roy Choi
- Ming Tsai
- Jennifer Yee

==== Acting and filmmaking ====
- Eric Byler
- John Cho
- Rodney Kageyama

==== Dance ====
- Dana Tai Soon Burgess
- Dominic Sandoval
- Lawrence Kao
- Jabbawockeez
- Poreotics
- We Are Heroes

==== Music ====
- Conan Gray
- Hayley Kiyoko
- Eddie Van Halen
- Jessica Jung
- Tyga
- Olivia Rodrigo
- Saweetie

==== Television ====
- Christine Ha
- Tammy Jih
- Poreotics
- Quest Crew

=== Law ===
- Viet D. Dinh
- Heather Fong
- Debra Wong Yang

=== Literature ===
- Nellie Wong
- Laurence Yep
- Truong Tran
- Frank Chin

=== Military ===
- Susan Ahn Cuddy
- Joe Hayashi
- Young-Oak Kim
- Eldon Regua

=== News, media, and journalism ===
- Christine Chen
- Veronica De La Cruz
- Lisa Ling
- Iva Toguri D'Aquino

=== Politics ===
- Larry Asera
- David S. Chang
- Charles Djou
- Leana Wen

==== Activism ====
- Larry Itliong

=== Religion ===
- Randolph Roque Calvo
- Francis Chan

=== Science ===
- Michio Kaku
- Leroy Chiao

=== Sports ===
- Amy Chow
- Patrick Chung
- Tiger Woods
- Tabitha Yim

== See also ==
- List of Asian American writers
- List of Asian Americans in STEM fields
- Military History of Asian Americans
- List of Asian American jurists

== Contribution ==
=== Chinese contributions and the rise and decline of Anaheim’s Chinatown ===
Anaheim was the first incorporated city in Orange County. It was founded in 1857 by a group of German immigrants associated with the Los Angeles Vineyard Society. Initially, the settlers hired approximately sixty Mexican and Indigenous laborers to construct a six-mile irrigation canal connecting the Santa Ana River to their new wine-making enterprise. Dissatisfied with this workforce, the German settlers later traveled to San Francisco to recruit thirty Chinese laborers.

Amalie Frohling, an early Anaheim settler, wrote in her 1914 memoir that the Chinese workers were “industrious, peaceful, never drunk, and kept cleaner in body than the Indians.” Each Chinese laborer was compensated with a town lot, and these parcels later formed the spatial foundation of Anaheim’s early Chinatown.

Over time, Anaheim’s Chinese population grew to become the second-largest ethnic group in the city, after the German community. Chinese immigrants planted hundreds of thousands of grapevines, excavated the sixteen-mile Cajon Canal from the Anaheim Union Reservoir (now located within Tri-City Regional Park in Placentia), constructed some of Orange County’s earliest railroads, and worked extensively in the region’s agricultural fields. Several Chinese physicians provided medical care within Anaheim’s Chinatown, while others operated vegetable businesses and laundries, contributing to the city’s early economic and social development.

Despite these contributions, Anaheim’s Chinese community began to decline following the implementation of the Chinese Exclusion Act of 1882. This decline was further accelerated by anti-Chinese violence in Orange County and racially motivated boycotts of Chinese-owned businesses. After 1910, Chinese residents gradually left the area, and by 1935, only one Chinese resident remained in Anaheim.

== Challenges ==
=== Language barrier ===
In 2023, 23% of immigrant households in California experienced linguistic isolation. Although linguistic isolation affects many immigrant households, the rate is higher among undocumented immigrant households. Statewide in 2023, 33% of undocumented immigrant households were linguistically isolated, compared with 25% of lawful permanent resident households and 21% of naturalized citizen households.

Data from the California Immigrant Data portal show that approximately 1.03 million immigrant households—about 23%—experienced linguistic isolation in 2023. Limited English proficiency restricts individuals’ ability to participate in community activities and access public information, which may increase their risk of depression. This represents one of the challenges faced by immigrant communities.

=== Social exclusion ===
According to a 2023 Pew Research Center survey, many Asian immigrants, including Chinese immigrants, tend to form social circles primarily with people of the same ethnicity. The report found that 56% of Asian immigrant adults said that all or most of their friends share their ethnicity or are otherwise Asian, compared with 38% among U.S.-born Asians. These patterns suggest that immigrant Asians often experience limited social integration and rely more heavily on co-ethnic networks. This data has also been interpreted by scholars as evidence that Asian immigrants face barriers to social integration in the United States. In addition to language and cultural differences, some studies note that experiences of discrimination or perceived social exclusion may discourage Asian immigrants from participating in broader social networks. These factors contribute to a greater reliance on co-ethnic communities, resulting in more concentrated social circles. If greater social acceptance were extended to these immigrants, they might be able to integrate more fully into American society and culture.
