= XPO =

XPO may refer to:

- Expo MRT station, Singapore (MRT station abbreviation)
- Frisky Dingo#Episodes
- XPO, Inc., American transportation company
- Chi Rho Omicron (XPO), a Filipino based fraternity on the West Coast
