= Tiffany Lam =

- Born: 25 October 1980 (age 45); Hong Kong
- Years active: 2003–2004

Chinese name
Transcriptions
Standard Mandarin
- Hanyu Pinyin: Lín Mǐnì
Yue: Cantonese
- Jyutping: lam4 man5 lei6
- Musical career
- Also known as: Tinkerbell

Tiffany Lam or Tiffany Lam Man Lei (Chinese: 林敏俐, born 25 October 1980) is a former beauty queen from San Francisco. She held the title of Miss Hong Kong 2002 and Miss Chinese International 2003 runner up.

== Early life ==
Lam was born in Hong Kong in 1980. During her childhood, she immigrated to San Francisco, California, where she studied for many years. Lam later attended the University of California, Davis. She is a member of Sigma Omicron Pi sorority, Delta chapter. She then returned to Hong Kong to compete in the Miss Hong Kong 2002 pageant. Her younger cousin, Sandy Lau, won the 2009 Miss Hong Kong.

== Miss Hong Kong 2002 ==
She was chosen out of many delegates from USA and Canada to go back to Hong Kong to compete. She made the top 12 of the Miss Hong Kong 2002 pageant in early July. Three weeks later, she competed and won the Miss Hong Kong pageant final on its 30th anniversary, also winning two side awards, "Miss International Goodwill" and "Miss Modern Style".

== Miss Chinese International 2003 ==
After winning the Miss Hong Kong title, Lam became an ambassador for Hong Kong, representing Hong Kong at the Miss Chinese International Pageant 2003 in January 2003, where she finished second behind Rachel Tan of Kuala Lumpur.

== Post-pageant ==
Lam subsequently starred in two TVB dramas, Net Deception and Not Just A Pretty Face. Her 1st runner up and friend, Victoria Jolly, also appeared in Not Just A Pretty Face. After she crowned her successor, Mandy Cho Man Li, Lam returned to San Francisco to continue her studies. She returned to Hong Kong to crown the 1st runner up of the Miss Chinese International Pageant 2004.

As of 2007, Lam works for her family restaurant business in the San Francisco Bay Area.

== Awards ==
- Miss Hong Kong 2002: Winner, Miss International Goodwill, and Miss Modern Style.
- Miss Chinese International 2003: 1st runner up.

== TVB dramas ==
- Net Deception (2002)
- Not Just A Pretty Face (2003)

Achievements
Preceded by Shirley Yeung	Miss Hong Kong; 2002	Succeeded by Mandy Cho
