= List of Asian American fraternities and sororities =

Asian American interest in Greek-lettered organizations began in the early 20th century. After World War II, there was a surge in participation to join these organizations, as college campuses were seeing a rise in multiculturalism. Rho Psi was the first Asian American interest Greek-lettered organization. It was created on the campus of Cornell University in 1916. Since then, there has been growth in these Asian American interest Greek lettered organizations across North America. There are over sixty Asian American interest Greek-lettered organizations, many of which are overseen by the National APIDA Panhellenic Association (NAPA).

== Fraternities ==
Inactive organizations are in italics.

Organization	Symbols	Charter date and range	Founding location	Emphasis	Affiliation	Active chapters	Status	Ref.
Alpha Iota Omicron	ΑΙΟ	October 16, 1998	University of Michigan	South Asians	Independent	1	Active	
Alpha Kappa Omega	ΑΚΩ	March 31, 1997	California State University, East Bay	Asian Americans	Independent	1	Active	
Alpha Psi Rho	ΑΨΡ	March 1, 2000	San Diego State University	Pacific Islanders	Independent	4	Active	
Alpha Sigma Lambda	ΑΣΛ	October 15, 1993 – October 2011	California State Polytechnic University, Pomona	Asian Americans	Independent	0	Inactive	(Note: Its one chapter was suspended through the spring of 2014 for hazing. It had a history of hazing dating back to 2006.)
Beta Chi Theta	ΒΧΘ	June 2, 1999	University of California, Los Angeles	South Asians	NIC, NAPA (former)	20	Active	
Beta Kappa Gamma	ΒΚΓ	May 6, 1999 – after 2015	University of Texas at Austin	South Asians	Independent	0	Inactive	
Beta Pi Phi	ΒΠΦ	December 5, 2005 – 2018	Temple University	Asian Americans	Independent	0	Inactive	
Beta Tau Omega	ΒΤΩ	August 28, 1995	Texas A&M University	Asian Americans	Independent	1	Active	
Beta Upsilon Delta	ΒΥΔ	August 21, 1998	University of California, Riverside	Multicultural	Independent	1	Active	
Chi Psi Beta	ΧΨΒ	November 18, 1998	Texas A&M University	South Asians	Independent	1	Active	
Chi Rho Omicron	ΧΡΟ	February 16, 1995	California State University, Fresno	Filipinos	Independent	10	Active	
Chi Sigma Tau	ΧΣΤ	September 9, 1999	University of Illinois at Chicago	Asian interest	NAPA	10	Active	
Delta Chi Psi	ΔΧΨ	December 18, 2004	Temple University	Asian Americans	Independent	1	Active	(Note: The fraternity formed from Temple Asian Brothers United (TABU), established in 2002.)
Delta Epsilon Psi	ΔΕΨ	October 1, 1998	University of Texas at Austin	South Asians	NAPA, NIC (former)	16	Active	
Delta Sigma Iota	ΔΣΙ	August 15, 2000	Pennsylvania State University, University Park Campus	South Asians	NAPA	8	Active	
Eta Mu Theta	ΗΜΘ	February 25, 2015	California State University, Chico	Hmong	Independent	1	Active	
Gakusei Kai		1920	University of Southern California	Japanese Americans	Independent	1	Active	
Gamma Beta	ΓΒ	May 1, 2000	University of Texas at Austin	Asian Americans	Independent	6	Active	
Gamma Epsilon Omega	ΓΕΩ	1963	University of Southern California	Asian interest	Independent	1	Active	
Iota Nu Delta	ΙΝΔ	February 7, 1994	Binghamton University	South Asians	NAPA, NIC	10	Active	
Kappa Pi Beta	ΚΠΒ	March 16, 2000	Northern Illinois University	Asian Americans	NAPA	4	Active	
Lambda Alpha Phi	ΛΑΦ	January 1, 1997	Indiana University Bloomington	Asian Americans	Independent	1	Active	
Lambda Phi Epsilon	ΛΦΕ	February 25, 1981	University of California, Los Angeles	Asian Americans	NAPA. NIC (former)	68	Active	
Lambda Psi Rho	ΛΨΡ	February 11, 2006	University of Nevada, Reno	Asian interest	Independent	1	Active	
Lambda Theta Delta	ΛΘΔ	March 2, 1983	University of California, Irvine	Asian Americans	Independent	1	Active	
Nu Alpha Phi	ΝΑΦ	March 18, 1994	State University of New York at Albany	Asian Americans	Independent	10	Active	
Omega Phi Gamma	ΩΦΓ	May 21, 1995	University of Texas at Austin	Asian Americans	Independent	8	Active	
Omega Sigma Tau	ΩΣΤ	March 9, 1996	University of California, Los Angeles	Asian interest	Independent	1	Active	
Omega Xi Delta	ΩΞΔ	1994	California Polytechnic State University, San Luis Obispo	Asian Americans	Independent	1	Active	
Phi Delta Sigma	ΦΔΣ	August 7, 2007	University of Maryland, College Park	Asian Americans	Independent	1	Active	
Pi Alpha Phi	ΠΑΦ	February 1, 1929 – August 1, 2023	University of California, Berkeley	Asian Americans	NAPA (former)	0	Inactive	(Note: The fraternity had chartered 28 chapters but decided to close all chapters during the COVID pandemic.)
Pi Delta Psi	ΠΔΨ	February 20, 1994	Binghamton University	Asian Americans	NAPA	18	Active	
Psi Chi Omega	ΨΧΩ	January 24, 1992	University of California, San Diego	Asian Americans	Independent	4	Active	
Rho Psi	ΡΨ	1916	Cornell University	Chinese	Independent	2	Active	
Sigma Beta Rho	ΣΒΡ	August 16, 1996	University of Pennsylvania	Multicultural	NAPA, NIC	23	Active	(Note: Sigma Beta Rho started as a South Asian interest group but became a multicultural fraternity.)
Tau Kappa Omega	ΤΚΩ	March 9, 2002	University of Oklahoma	Asian Americans	Independent	1	Active	
Theta Delta Beta	ΘΔΒ	May 25, 1990 – 20xx ?	University of California, Irvine	Filipinos	Independent	0	Inactive	(Note: Had 3 chapters, but all seem to be inactive as of 2024. The university suspended the USCF chapter.)
Theta Lambda Beta	ΘΛΒ	September 20, 2010	University of Illinois, Chicago	Asian Americans	Independent	1	Active	
Xi Kappa	ΞΚ	February 28, 1998	University of Georgia	Asian interest	Independent	3	Active	
Zeta Epsilon Tau	ΖΕΤ	1971	University of Southern California	Asian Americans	Independent	0	Inactive	(Note: Fraternity was founded at the University of Southern California and later moved to California State University, Long Beach.) (Note: Fraternity was suspended by the university.)
Zeta Phi Rho	ΖΦΡ	August 20, 1995	California State University, Long Beach	Multicultural and Asian interest	Independent	7	Active	

== Sororities ==
Inactive organizations are in italics.

Organization	Symbols	Charter date and range	Founding location	Emphasis	Affiliation	Active chapters	Status	Ref.
Alpha Delta Kappa	ΑΔΚ	February 1, 1977	University of Southern California	Asian Americans	Independent	1	Active	
alpha Kappa Delta Phi	αΚΔΦ	February 7, 1990	University of California, Berkeley	Asian Americans	NAPA	70	Active	
Alpha Kappa Omicron	ΑΚΟ	December 3, 1997	San Francisco State University	Filipino Americans	Independent	3	Active	
Alpha Phi Gamma	ΑΦΓ	February 1, 1994	California State Polytechnic University, Pomona	Asian Americans	NAPA	14	Active	
Alpha Sigma Rho	ΑΣΡ	April 2, 1998	University of Georgia	Asian American service	NAPA	12	Active	
Chi Alpha Delta	ΧΑΔ	April 5, 1929	University of California, Los Angeles	Asian Americans	Independent	1	Active	
Chi Delta Sigma	ΧΔΣ	February 8, 2007	Washington State University	Asian Americans and Pacific Islander	Independent	3	Active	
Chi Delta Theta	ΧΔΘ	October 13, 1989	University of California, Santa Barbara	Asian Americans	Independent	7	Active	
Chi Sigma Alpha	ΧΣΑ	September 2, 2002	University of Washington, Seattle	Asian Americans	Independent	2	Active	
Delta Chi Lambda	ΔΧΛ	October 12, 2000	University of Arizona	Asian Americans	Independent	3	Active	
Delta Kappa Delta	ΔΚΔ	October 1, 1999	Texas A&M University	South Asians	NAPA	12	Active	
Delta Lambda Chi	ΔΛΧ	February 9, 2002	University of California, Irvine	Asian interest	Independent	2	Active	
Delta Phi Gamma	ΔΦΓ	April 1, 1998 – June 2023	University of California, Irvine	Asian interest	Independent	0	Inactive	(Note: The university suspended the sorority through June 2026 for alcohol violations and hazing.)
Delta Phi Kappa	ΔΦΚ	May 6, 1960	University of Southern California	Asian Americans	Independent	1	Active	
Delta Phi Lambda	ΔΦΛ	December 5, 1998	University of Georgia	Asian Americans	NAPA	26	Active	
Delta Phi Omega	ΔΦΩ	December 6, 1998	University of Houston	South Asians	NAPA	25	Active	
Delta Theta Psi	ΔΘΨ	January 14, 2002	University of Michigan	South Asians	Independent	0	Inactive	
Kappa Gamma Delta	ΚΓΔ	April 17, 1997	Indiana University Bloomington	Asian Americans	Independent	1	Active	
Kappa Lambda Delta	ΚΛΔ	September 19, 2005	Texas Christian University	Asian interest	Independent	1	Active	
Kappa Psi Epsilon	ΚΨΕ	March 28, 1996	California State University, Long Beach	Filipinos	Independent	5	Active	
Kappa Phi Gamma	ΚΦΓ	November 8, 1998	University of Texas at Austin	South Asians	NAPA	10	Active	
Kappa Phi Lambda	ΚΦΛ	March 9, 1995	Binghamton University	Asian interest	NAPA	25	Active	
Kappa Zeta Phi	ΚΖΦ	December 1960	California State University, Los Angeles	Asian Americans	Independent	3	Active	
Lambda Delta Psi	ΛΔΨ	May 1, 2009	University of Oklahoma	Asian interest	Independent	5	Active	
Phi Delta Alpha	ΦΔΑ	April 2, 2002	University of Oklahoma	Asian interest	Independent	2	Active	
Phi Zeta Tau	ΦΖΤ	February 10, 1983	University of California, Irvine	Asian interest	Independent	1	Active	
Rho Delta Chi	ΡΔΧ	January 17, 1991	University of California, Riverside	Asian Americans	Independent	5	Active	
Sigma Omicron Pi	ΣΟΠ	1930	San Francisco State University	Asian Americans	NAPA (former)	12	Active	
Sigma Phi Omega	ΣΦΩ	1949	University of Southern California	Asian Americans	Interactive	9	Active	
Sigma Psi Zeta	ΣΨΖ	March 23, 1994	University at Albany	Asian Americans	NAPA	20	Active	
Sigma Sigma Rho	ΣΣΡ	December 10, 1998	St. John’s University	South Asians	NAPA	28	Active	
Theta Kappa Phi	ΘΚΦ	June 4, 1959	University of California, Los Angeles	Asian interest	Independent	1	Active	

== See also ==
- Cultural interest fraternities and sororities
- List of social fraternities
- List of social sororities and women's fraternities
- National APIDA Panhellenic Association
