= Omega Phi Gamma =

American collegiate Asian-Interest fraternity

- ΩΦΓ
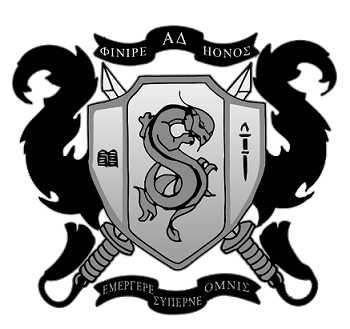
- Founded: May 21, 1995; 30 years ago University of Texas at Austin
- Type: Social
- Affiliation: Independent
- Status: Active
- Emphasis: Asian American
- Scope: National
- Motto: "Bound by Honor, Rise Above All"
- Colors: Ash Grey, Black, and White
- Symbol: Dragon
- Chapters: 8
- Nickname: Omegas and OPhiG
- Headquarters: 2818 Rio Grande Street; Austin, Texas 78705-3608; United States
- Website: www.omegaphigamma.com

Omega Phi Gamma (ΩΦΓ, also known as Omegas or OPhiG) is an Asian-Interest collegiate fraternity in the United States. It was established at the University of Texas at Austin in 1995 and has expanded to include eight chapters in Texas and California.

== History ==
Omega Phi Gamma was founded at the University of Texas at Austin in the fall of 1995. It originated with the big brother program of the sorority, Sigma Phi Omega. Its twenty founders were members of the Sigma Phi Omega big brother program and their close friends. They envisioned was an organization that would "promote brotherhood, leadership and service within the Asian-American community".

The founding fathers first meet on November 18, 1994. The founding fathers were:

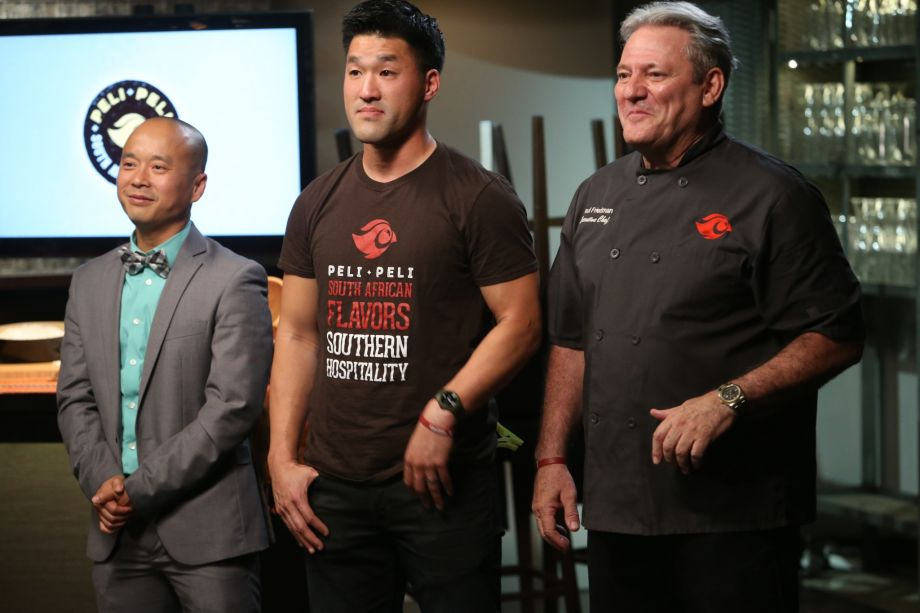
Founder, Thomas Nguyen (Middle) and Alpha class, Aiki Tran (left) on CNBC's Restaurant Startup reality show

- Alex Chang
- Ting Chang
- Tom Chang
- Charlie Chang
- Ze Chen
- Christian Fernandez
- Michael Gong
- Minh Ha
- Jeff Ho
- Nguyen Ho
- Dave Lee
- Matthew Lee
- Michael Lee
- Sung Lim
- Hsin-Lei Liu
- Thomas Nguyen
- Andy Pan
- William Reeves
- Andrew To
- Joseph Yu
- Stephen Yuen

On December 2, 1994, the founders officially introduced themselves to the University of Texas at Austin campus with a step show. In the spring of 1995, they visited already established Asian fraternities but were unimpressed with the quality of the fraternities.

On May 21, 1985, the founders voted unanimously to start a new fraternity. They named it Omega Phi Gamma. The fraternity held its first rush in the fall of 1995. The chapter became a member of the Texas Asian Pan-Hellenic Council at the university.

Later, one of the fraternity's early members proposed the establishment of a brother fraternity, now the South Asian interest fraternity Delta Epsilon Psi. Omega Pi Gamma, Sigma Phi Omega and Delta Epsilon Psi are called the Tri-family or Tri-fam.

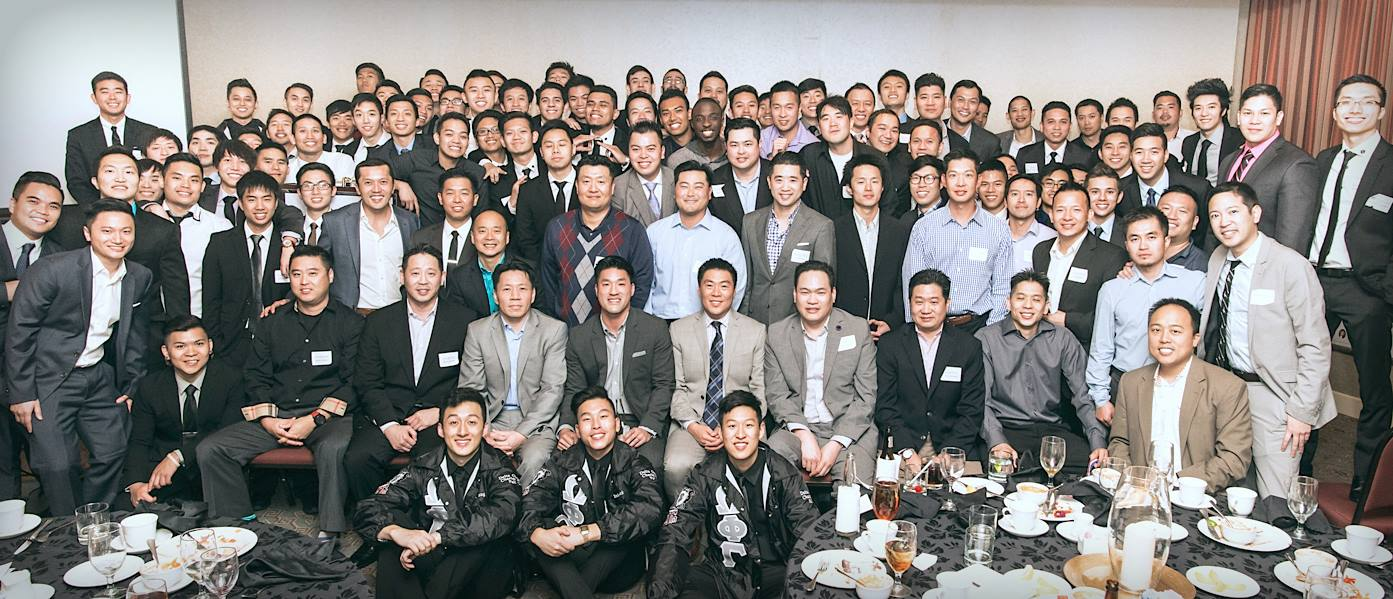
Omega Convention 20th Anniversary and Texas A&M Charter Class Crossing Ceremony

== Symbols ==
The motto of Omega Phi Gamma is "Bound by Honor, Rise Above All". Its symbol is the dragon. Its colors are ash grey, black, and white. Its nicknames are Omegas and OPhiG.

== Activities ==
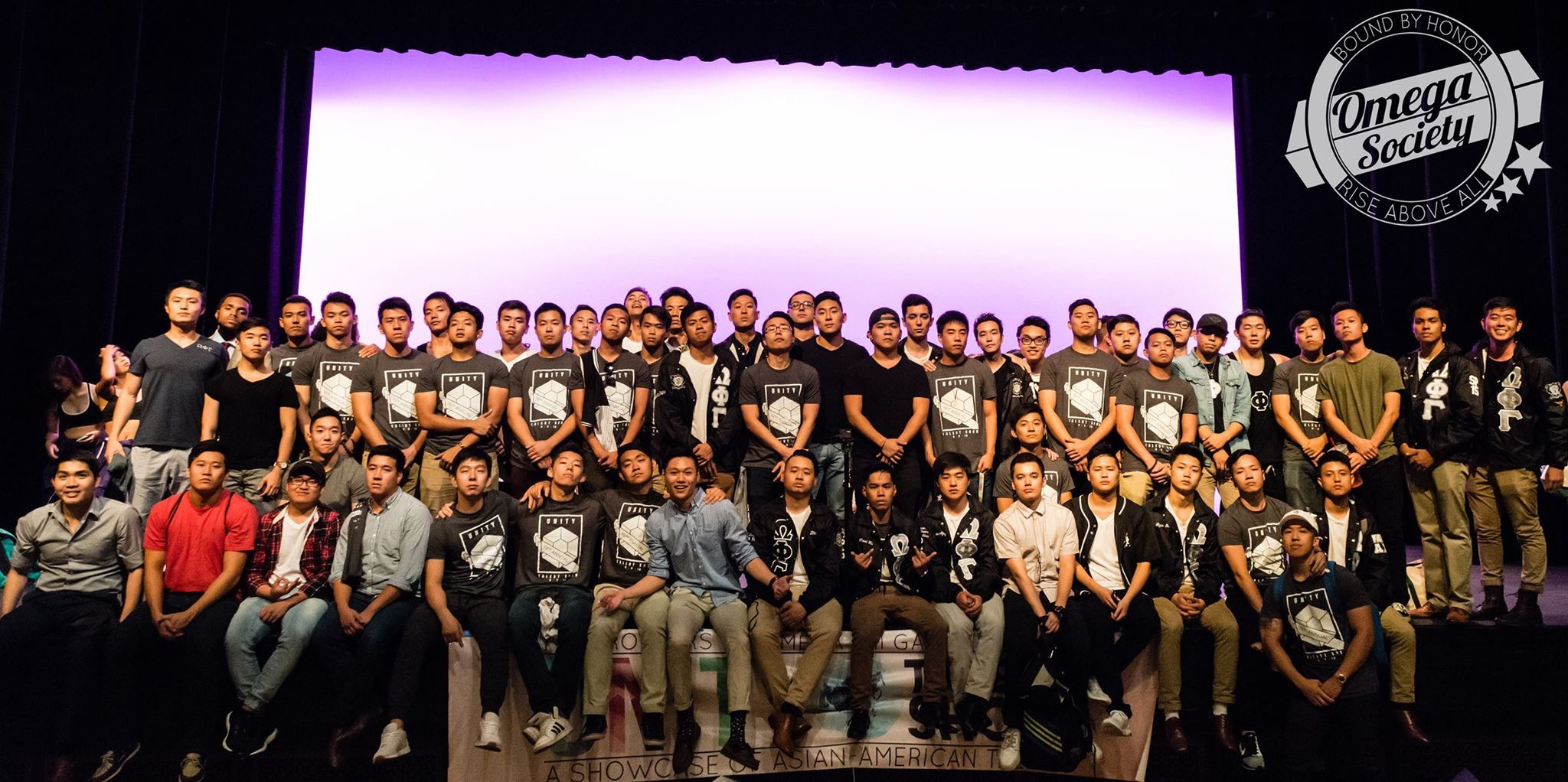
Omegas at Unity 2016

Each fall, the fraternity hosts the UNITY talent show, which showcases Asian American talent and features the Omegas step show. In Spring of 2024, the legendary Step Team 6 (ST6) was formed and has grown into one of the most recognized and celebrated step groups in the country, consistently pushing the boundaries of elite step routines. Former members: Brian Wong, Derek Wang, Kwame Morrison, Gene Pham, Jomai Duongvilay, Keane Ogao, Evan Gee, Dylan Pham.

== Philanthropy ==
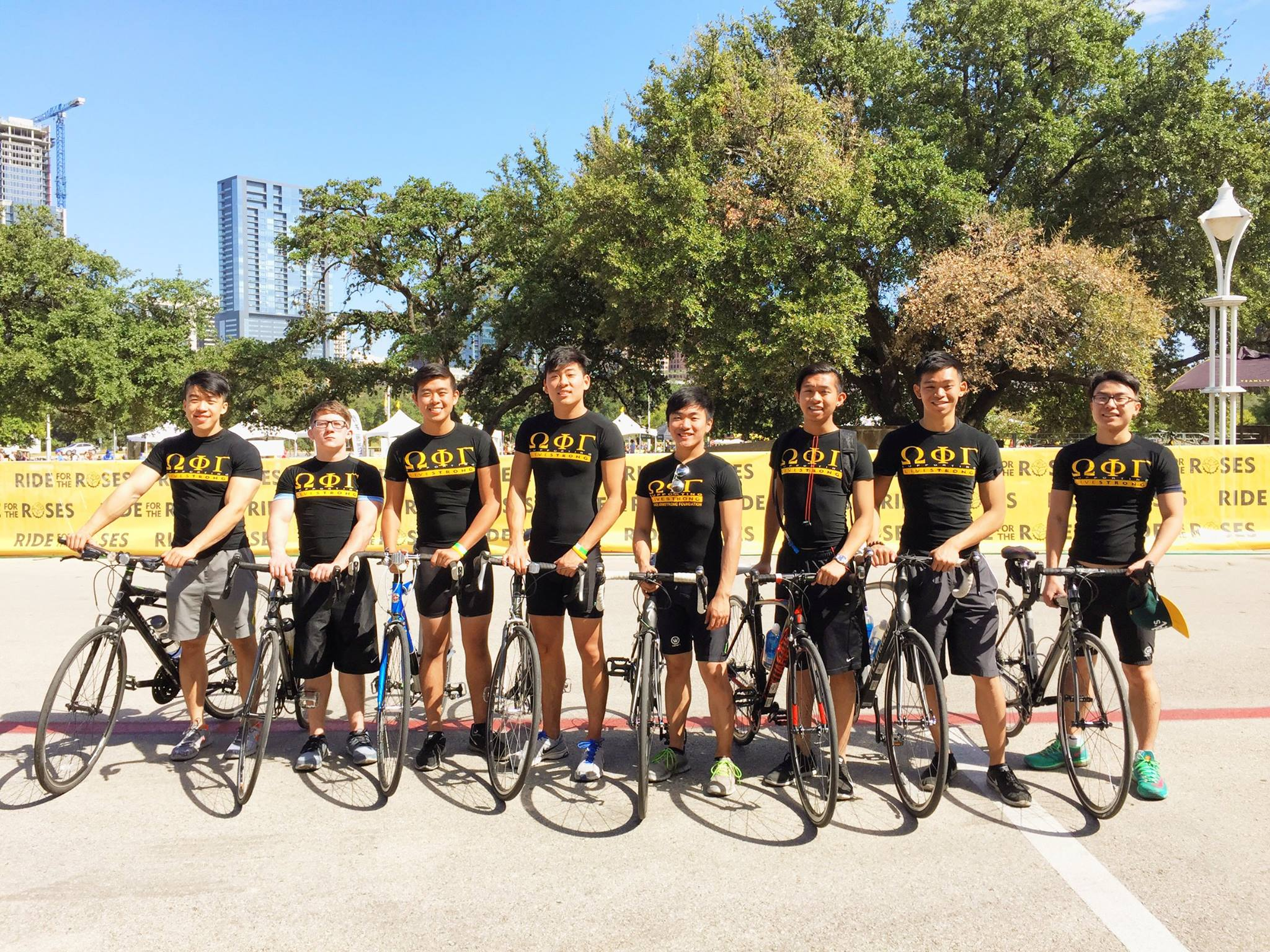
Members and alumni participate in the Livestrong bike ride

Omega Phi Gamma's annual philanthropic project is the Lance Armstrong Foundation, with members participating in the Austin LIVESTRONG Challenge. In addition to this, Omega Phi Gamma members volunteering including tutoring children at local schools, feeding the homeless at the University United Methodist Church, and repairing houses to be given to those less fortunate.

In 2015, fraternity's alumni fund an endowed scholarship at the University of Texas at Austin, the Omega Phi Gamma Endowed Scholarship. It is awarded to incoming freshmen who are pursuing degrees in business, engineering, geology, or natural sciences.

== Chapters ==
Chapter	Chater date	Institution	Location	Status	Reference
Founding chapter	1995	University of Texas at Austin	Austin, Texas	Active	
Alpha		Baylor University	Waco, Texas	Inactive	
Beta	2004	University of Houston	Houston, Texas	Active	
Gamma	2011	University of Texas at San Antonio	San Antonio, Texas	Active	
Delta	2014	Texas A&M University	College Station, Texas	Active	
Epsilon		Dallas Citywide	Dallas, Texas	Active	
Zeta		University of California, Irvine	Irvine, California	Inactive	
Eta	2024	Texas State University	San Marcos, Texas	Active	

== Member misconduct ==
In 2000, the founding chapter was placed on probation by the University of Texas for hazing. However during further investigation the fraternity has been placed back in good standing.

== See also ==
- List of social fraternities and sororities
- List of Asian American fraternities and sororities
- Cultural interest fraternities and sororities
