= List of Georgia Tech fraternities and sororities =

The first fraternity to establish a chapter at Georgia Tech was Alpha Tau Omega in 1888 before the school held its first classes. Tau Sigma (local) was established in 1954 as sorority on campus; it later became a chapter of Alpha Xi Delta.

Georgia Tech has over fifty active chapters of social fraternities and sororities. All of the groups are chapters of national organizations, including members of the North American Interfraternity Conference (IFC), National Panhellenic Conference (NPC), and National Pan-Hellenic Council. Most of the IFC and NPC organizations have houses on Georgia Tech's campus, generally on or near Fifth Street, Ferst Avenue, Fowler Street, or Techwood Drive, in the area known as the Greek Sector.

As of the fall of 2023, 25 percent of Georgia Tech's male undergraduates belong to a fraternity and 32 percent of its female undergraduates belong to a sorority. Members of the university's fraternities and sororities provided more than 48,000 community service hours and raised students $206,000 for local and national nonprofits in the 2012 to 2013 academic year.

Following is a list of Georgia Tech fraternities and sororities.

== Interfraternity Council ==
There are currently 31 active member chapters of the Georgia Tech Interfraternity Council (IFC).

Organization	Symbols	Chapter	Local charter date and range	Nickname
Alpha Epsilon Pi	ΑΕΠ	Zeta	1920–1923, 1946	AEPi
Alpha Sigma Phi	ΑΣΦ	Zeta Eta	2012	Alpha Sig
Alpha Tau Omega	ΑΤΩ	Beta Iota	1888	ATO
Beta Theta Pi	ΒΘΠ	Gamma Eta	1917–2012, 2014	Beta
Chi Phi	ΧΦ	Omega	1904–2002, 2006	
Chi Psi	ΧΨ	Iota Delta	1923	
Delta Chi	ΔΧ	Georgia Tech	1991	
Delta Sigma Phi	ΔΣΦ	Alpha Gamma	1920–1997, 2002	Delta Sig
Delta Tau Delta	ΔΤΔ	Gamma Psi	1921	Delts
Delta Upsilon	ΔΥ	Georgia Tech	1957	DU
Kappa Alpha Order	ΚΑ	Alpha Sigma	1899	
Kappa Sigma	ΚΣ	Alpha Tau	1895	Kappa Sig
Lambda Chi Alpha	ΛΧΑ	Beta Kappa	1927 as a chapter of Beta Kappa; became Lambda Chi Alpha in 1942; suspended February 2019; rechartered 2024	Lambda Chi
Phi Delta Theta	ΦΔΘ	Georgia Delta	1902	Phi Delt
Phi Gamma Delta	ΦΓΔ	Gamma Tau	1921	Fiji
Phi Kappa Psi	ΦΚΨ	Georgia Beta	2000	Phi Psi
Phi Kappa Sigma	ΦΚΣ	Alpha Nu	1904	Skulls
Phi Kappa Theta	ΦΚΘ	Gamma Tau	1969	Phi Kap
Phi Sigma Kappa	ΦΣΚ	Kappa Deuteron	1923	Phi Sig
Phi Kappa Tau	ΦΚΤ	Alpha Rho	1929–1936, 1946–2014, 2021, 2017	Phi Tau
Pi Kappa Alpha	ΠΚΑ	Alpha Delta	1904	Pike
Pi Kappa Phi	ΠΚΦ	Iota	1913	Pi Kapp
Psi Upsilon	ΨΥ	Gamma Tau^{†}	1970	Psi U
Sigma Alpha Epsilon	ΣΑΕ	Georgia Phi	1890–1891, 1892–2000, 2006	SAE
Sigma Chi	ΣΧ	Beta Psi	1922	
Sigma Nu	ΣΝ	Gamma Alpha	1896	Snu
Sigma Phi Epsilon	ΣΦΕ	Georgia Alpha	1907	SigEp
Tau Kappa Epsilon	ΤΚΕ	Beta Pi	1948	TKE
Theta Chi	ΘΧ	Alpha Nu	1923	
Theta Xi	ΘΞ	Beta Alpha^{‡}	1951	The Taxi
Triangle Fraternity		Colony	2014	
Zeta Beta Tau	ΖΒΤ	Xi	1916 as a chapter of Phi Epsilon Pi; merged into ZBT in 1970; rechartered: 2007	ZBT or Zebe

=== Notes ===
- ^{†} One of numerous co-educational chapters of a nationally all-male fraternity.
- ^{‡} Only Christian chapter of a nationally nonsectarian fraternity.

== Panhellenic Council ==
There are currently eight full and two associate members of the Georgia Tech Collegiate Panhellenic Council. Because Alpha Delta Chi (a national Christian sorority) and Alpha Omega Epsilon (a national engineering sorority) are not members of the National Panhellenic Conference, the Georgia Tech chapters of these organizations are classified as Associate Members of the Georgia Tech Collegiate Panhellenic Council.

Organization	Symbols	Chapter	Local charter date and range	Nickname
Alpha Chi Omega	ΑΧΩ	Epsilon Phi	1975	A Chi O or Alpha Chi
Alpha Delta Pi	ΑΔΠ	Zeta Omicron	1977	ADPi
Alpha Gamma Delta	ΑΓΔ	Gamma Phi	1972	AGD or Alpha Gam
Alpha Phi	ΑΦ	Iota Mu	2008	APhi
Alpha Xi Delta	ΑΞΔ	Gamma Eta	1954	AXiD or Alpha Xi
Kappa Alpha Theta	ΚΑΘ	Theta Nu	2016	KAT or Theta
Phi Mu	ΦΜ	Theta Zeta	1989	
Zeta Tau Alpha	ΖΤΑ	Iota Theta	1984	Zeta
Alpha Delta Chi	ΑΔΧ	Sigma	2003	ADChi
Alpha Omega Epsilon	ΑΩΕ	Sigma	2006	AOE

== Pan-Hellenic Conference ==
Georgia Tech is home to chapters representing eight of the nine members of the National Pan-Hellenic Council, an organization of Historically African-American fraternities and sororities, also known as Black Greek-Letter Organizations or BGLOs.

=== Fraternities ===
Organization		Chapter	Local charter date and range	Nickname
Alpha Phi Alpha	ΑΦΑ	Nu Mu	1977	Alphas
Kappa Alpha Psi	ΚΑΨ	Lambda Delta	1982	Kappas and Nupes
Phi Beta Sigma	ΦΒΣ	Nu Beta	1981–198x ?, 1994	Sigmas
Omega Psi Phi	ΩΨΦ	Delta Kappa	1976	Omegas and Ques

=== Sororities ===
Organization	Symbols	Chapter	Local charter date and range	Nickname
Alpha Kappa Alpha	ΑΚΑ	Nu Beta	1979	AKA
Delta Sigma Theta	ΔΣΘ	Xi Alpha	1978	Deltas
Zeta Phi Beta	ΖΦΒ	Gamma Rho	2000	Zetas
Sigma Gamma Rho	ΣΓΡ	Sigma Upsilon	2003	SGRhos and Lady Sigmas

== Multicultural Greek Council ==
Georgia Tech's Multicultural Greek Council is composed of seven culturally-oriented fraternities and sororities.

=== Fraternities ===
Organization	Symbols	Chapter	Local charter date and range	Nickname
Sigma Beta Rho	ΣΒΡ	Sigma	2005	SigRho
Xi Kappa	ΞΚ	Beta	2001	XK
Lambda Theta Phi	ΛΘΦ	Interest group	2017	

=== Sororities ===
Organization	Symbols	Chapter	Local charter date and range	Nickname
Delta Phi Lambda	ΔΦΛ	Zeta	2007	DPhiL
Sigma Sigma Rho	ΣΣΡ	Nu	2005	SigSigRho
Lambda Theta Alpha	ΛΘΑ	Interest group	2016	LTA
