= Jennifer Yee =

American chef, specializing in pastry

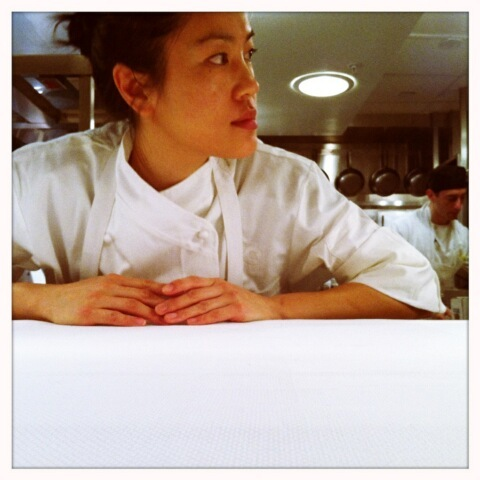
- Born: San Francisco
- Education: Le Cordon Bleu, London
- Culinary career
- Cooking style: French-inspired American pastry
- Ratings
- Michelin stars; AAA Motor Club; Mobil; Good Food Guide
- Current restaurants
- The Grill; Lafayette; Sho Shaun Hergatt; Aureole; Gilt

Jennifer Yee is an American chef, specializing in pastry. Born and raised in San Francisco, she worked in several pastry kitchens in some of New York's finest restaurants, including Lafayette in the NoHo neighborhood of Manhattan as Patissière, and The Grill in midtown Manhattan's Seagram Building, as the opening Pastry Chef, before becoming the Executive Pastry Chef for Chef Linton Hopkins' restaurants in Atlanta. Her work has been recognized by the James Beard Foundation in both New York and Atlanta.

She is currently the Executive Pastry Chef for Wynn Las Vegas.

== Background ==
Jennifer Yee began her culinary career by working as a pastry commis chef for Gordon Ramsay and Angela Hartnett at the Connaught Hotel, while attending London's Le Cordon Bleu, 2002–2003. After completing her Patisserie Diploma with Distinction at Cordon Bleu, Yee stayed on in London as pastry chef de partie at Alan Yau's Yauatcha. Yee returned to the United States in early 2006 and worked with Nick Morgenstern, who appointed her Pastry Sous Chef, and later David Carmichael at Gilt Restaurant in New York.

== Pastry Chef positions ==
In 2009 Yee left the two-Michelin-starred Gilt to assume her first head pastry chef position at Charlie Palmer's Aureole restaurant, working with Christopher Lee. While heading up the pastry department at the Michelin-starred mid-town New York restaurant, Yee was awarded the Star Chefs 'Rising Star' award for pastry, in 2010.

Following Chef Lee's departure from Aureole, Yee was offered the opportunity to work with Australian chef Shaun Hergatt at his fine dining establishment, SHO Shaun Hergatt, in Manhattan's Financial District.

While SHO garnered much critical praise, and two stars from Michelin, the restaurant closed its doors in 2012, but not before Yee's refined pastry program had caught the eye of the dessert-focused media, noting her "artful" desserts and "best petits fours in New York City".

After the closure of SHO, Chef Yee was offered the position of Patissière for Andrew Carmellini's latest project, the French Grand Cafe and Bakery, Lafayette, which opened in April 2013.

Yee received high praise for her bakery and dessert program at Lafayette from several newspaper and magazine critics including the New York Times, Bloomberg, Time Out, the New York Post, and the Observer. The New York Times's restaurant critic, Pete Wells, rated Yee's fig tart as one of the best dishes of 2013.

At the end of August, 2016, Chef Yee decided to part ways with Lafayette for extended culinary travels across Europe. On her return to New York in early 2017, she joined Chef Mario Carbone's team at The Grill, located in the former space of the Four Seasons Restaurant, to lead the opening pastry program, and helped the restaurant attain a three star review from the New York Times. Shortly after, Yee relocated to Atlanta to join Chef Linton Hopkins' 'Hopkins and Company' hospitality group and assume the new position of Executive Pastry Chef for the group.

At the beginning of 2023 Yee accepted the Executive Pastry Position at Wynn Las Vegas, making her the first female, and non-French chef to take up the role.

== Awards and nominations ==
In February 2014, Yee was announced as a semi-finalist for the James Beard Foundation Outstanding Pastry Chef award for the first time, and in November the Food and Wine Magazine declared her one of their top five Best New Pastry Chefs. In March 2016, after three years as pastry chef of Lafayette, she was announced as a finalist for the James Beard Foundation Outstanding Pastry Chef award. Six years later James Beard acknowledged her work once again, this time in Atlanta, with her fourth semi-final nomination.

- Star Chefs Rising Star Pastry Chef 2010
- James Beard Outstanding Pastry Chef Semi Finalist 2014
- Dessert Professional Top Ten Pastry Chefs 2014
- Food and Wine Best New Pastry Chefs 2014
- James Beard Outstanding Pastry Chef Semi Finalist 2015
- James Beard Outstanding Pastry Chef Finalist 2016
- James Beard Outstanding Pastry Chef Semi Finalist 2022

== Television ==
On Christmas Eve 2011, while at SHO, Yee took part in a fun Gingerbread house competition on Good Morning America. Her take on a 'Grinch Who Stole Christmas' themed house proved to be the favorite.

In October 2012, Yee appeared on Food Network's Sweet Genius. The finalists in the episode were Yee and Stephen Collucci, pastry chef of Tom Colicchio's Colicchio & Sons in New York's Meatpacking District. Yee scooped the $10,000 prize after a close contest between the two chefs.

In October 2015 she appeared on Beat Bobby Flay as a judge alongside Johnny Iuzzini and Paulette Goto in the "Trick or Treat" episode of season 6.
