= Sigma Phi Omega =

American collegiate Asian-interest sorority

- ΣΦΩ
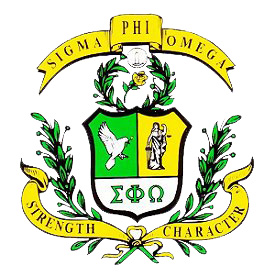
- Founded: 1949; 77 years ago University of California, Los Angeles
- Type: Social
- Affiliation: Independent
- Status: Active
- Emphasis: Service, Asian-Interest
- Scope: Regional
- Motto: "The Reward is in the Doing"
- Pillars: Strength and Character
- Colors: Kelly Green and Maize Yellow
- Symbol: White Dove
- Flower: Yellow Rose
- Chapters: 5 active
- Nickname: Sigmas, SPO
- Headquarters: 10683 Heather Ridge Drive; San Diego, California 92130; United States
- Website: www.sigmaphiomega.com

Sigma Phi Omega (ΣΦΩ), also known as Sigmas, is an Asian American interest sorority founded at the University of California, Los Angeles in Los Angeles, California

== History ==
Sigma Phi Omega was founded at the University of Southern California in 1949, and is the oldest Asian American sorority in the United States. It was originally established as a social organization for Japanese and Japanese American women at USC and has since then come to consist of a diverse membership of women hailing from numerous racial and cultural backgrounds.

Its founding mothers were:

- Miki Haga
- Joyce Ishibashi Tawa
- Ida Kado Watanabe
- Kazuko Kay Matsumoto
- Helen Morita Matsunaga
- Cherry Okimoto
- Akiko Sato Miyamoto
- Edna Tanaka Okui
- Helen Taniguchi Wakamatsu
- Miki Tanimoto
- Dottie Uno
- Julia Uriu
- Grace Wada Iino
- Betty Wakamatsu Nishikubo
- Chiyoe Yata Oki
- Mitzi Okamoto
- Thelma Sasada Yamamoto

Sigma Phi Omega was to join Chi Alpha Delta, an Asian-American sorority chartered at UCLA in 1928 that was reforming after World War II. However, the founding mothers of Sigma Phi Omega decided to start their own organization.

The Greek letters ΣΦΩ were chosen at random and were not used by any other existing college fraternities or sororities at that time. (The Greek letters were, however, being used by a national high school fraternity.) Although Sigma Phi Omega did not originate as a sorority, one could speculate that the choosing of Greek letters was a public way of voicing an unsatisfactory opinion about the treatment of Asian Americans, specifically Japanese Americans, by the campus and Greek organizations. Although was were no limitations, the organization's initial membership was primarily women of Japanese descent.

The sorority operated as a single-chapter organization until 1973, when a chapter was established at California State University, Long Beach. It became a regional sorority in 1991 with the formation of Gamma at the University of Texas at Austin. By December 2013, Sigma Phi Omega had chartered ten chapters in California and Texas.

== Symbols ==
The motto of Sigma Phi Omega is ''The Reward is in the Doing''. Its pillars are Strength an Character. The sorority's colors are Kelly green and maize yellow. Its symbol is the white dove. Its flower is the yellow rose. The sorority's nickname is the Sigmas.

== Governance ==
Sigma Phi Omega's national board was established in May 1988 at its third annual convention. The national board consists of a president, vice president, secretary, treasurer, California governor, Texas governor, and philanthropy chair. Officers are elected at the annual convention, hosted by chapters in rotation. The sorority's headquarters and foundation are in San Diego, California.

== Philanthropy ==
Sigma Phi Omega has chosen domestic violence awareness and prevention & sexual assault awareness as its national philanthropy. In October, all chapters organize a "SAFE (Stop Abuse For Everyone) WEEK" filled with seminars and discussions about domestic violence and fundraising events. Chapters also sponsor and participate service activities.

In 2009, the sorority established the Sigma Phi Omega Sorority Charitable Foundation, primarily to oversee scholarship for members of the sorority.

== Chapters ==
Sigma Phi Omega has installed nine chapters located in California and Texas. Active chapter noted in bold, inactive chapters noted in italics.

Chapter	Charter date and range	Institution	Location	Status	Ref.
Alpha	1949	University of California, Los Angeles	Los Angeles, California	Inactive	
Beta	1973	California State University, Long Beach	Long Beach, California	Inactive	
**Gamma**	May 1, 1991	University of Texas	Austin, Texas	Active	
**Delta**	December 18, 1991	San Diego State University	San Diego, California	Active	
**Epsilon**	April 21, 1995	University of Houston	Houston, Texas	Active	
Zeta	April 5, 1997	University of California, Berkeley	Berkeley, California	Inactive	
Eta	May 1, 1999 – 20xx ?	Baylor University	Waco, Texas	Inactive	
Theta	May 20, 2005 – 202x ?	Southern Methodist University	University Park, Texas	Inactive	
**Iota**	May 2, 2009	Texas A&M University	College Station, Texas	Active	
**Kappa**	December 8, 2013	University of Texas at Dallas	Richardson, Texas	Active	
**Lambda**	2020		San Antonio, Texas	Active	
**Mu**	2021		Riverside, California	Active	

== See also ==
- List of social sororities and women's fraternities
- List of Asian American fraternities and sororities
- Cultural interest fraternities and sororities
