= Omega Chapter of the Chi Phi Fraternity =

- U.S. National Register of Historic Places
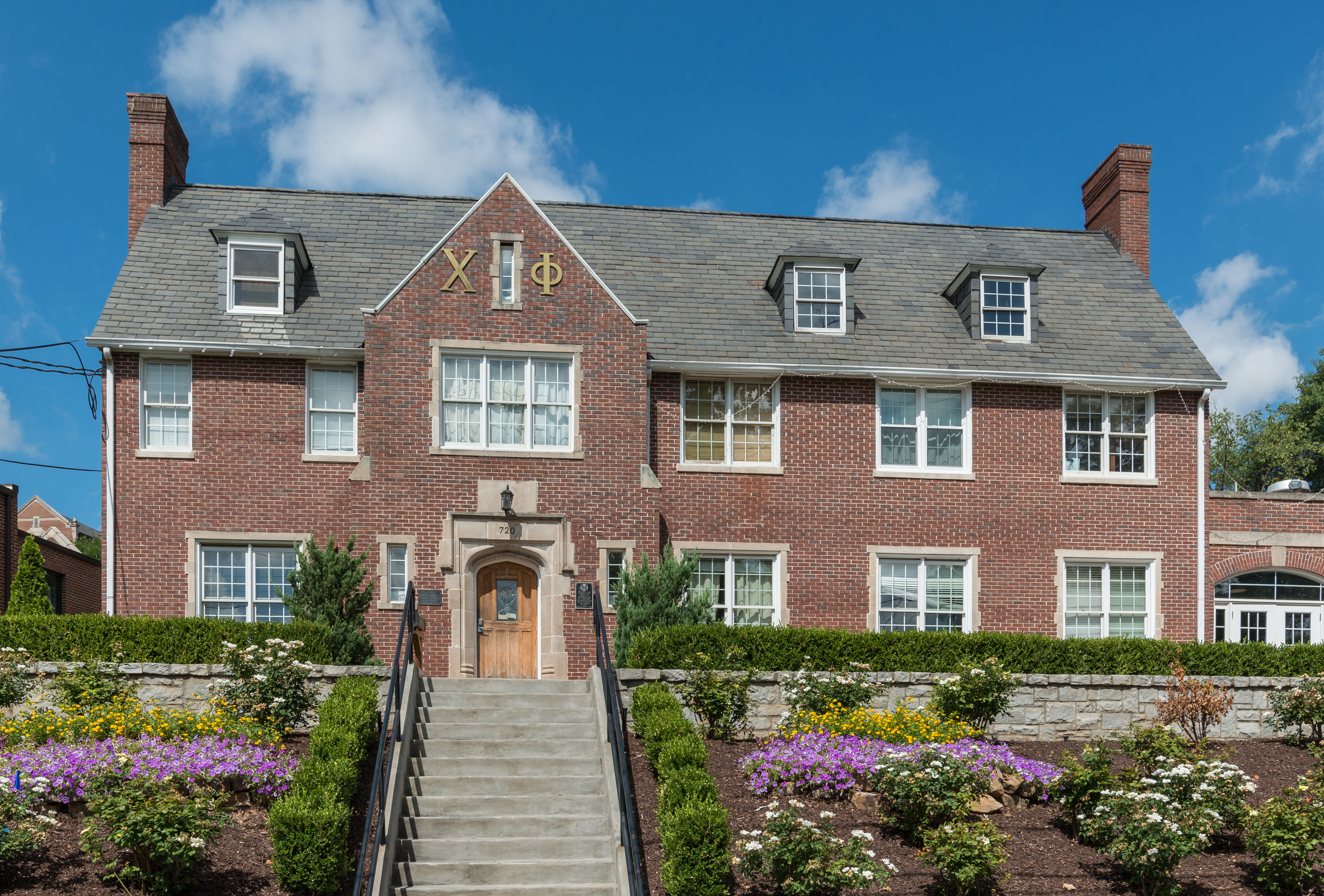
- Omega Chapter of the Chi Phi Fraternity (2016)

- Location within Atlanta Location within Georgia Location within the United States
- Location: 720 Fowler Street; Atlanta, Georgia, United States
- Coordinates: 33°46′27.5″N 84°23′38.7″W
- Built: 1929
- NRHP reference No.: 82002419
- Added to NRHP: June 17, 1982

The Omega Chapter of the Chi Phi Fraternity is a historic fraternity house located at the Georgia Institute of Technology (Georgia Tech) in Atlanta, Georgia, United States. The building was added to the National Register of Historic Places in 1982.

== History ==
In 1902, the Chi Phi fraternity began to investigate the possibility of a presence at the Georgia School of Technology (now Georgia Institute of Technology, commonly known as Georgia Tech) in Atlanta. By 1904, there were eight members at Tech and on June 2 of that year, the Omega Chapter at the school was officially chartered. In 1927, Omega Chapter members began to raise funds for the construction of a new fraternity house, which was constructed between June 1928 and Fall 1929. On June 17, 1982, this building was added to the National Register of Historic Places.

== Notable alumni ==
- Bob Davis (tackle) Georgia Tech Football Team Captain in 1947, All-American, College Football Hall of Fame Inductee.

== See also ==
- List of Chi Phi chapters
- List of fraternities and sororities at Georgia Institute of Technology
- Main campus of the Georgia Institute of Technology
- National Register of Historic Places listings in Fulton County, Georgia
- North American fraternity and sorority housing
