= David Carmichael =

American chef, specializing in pastry

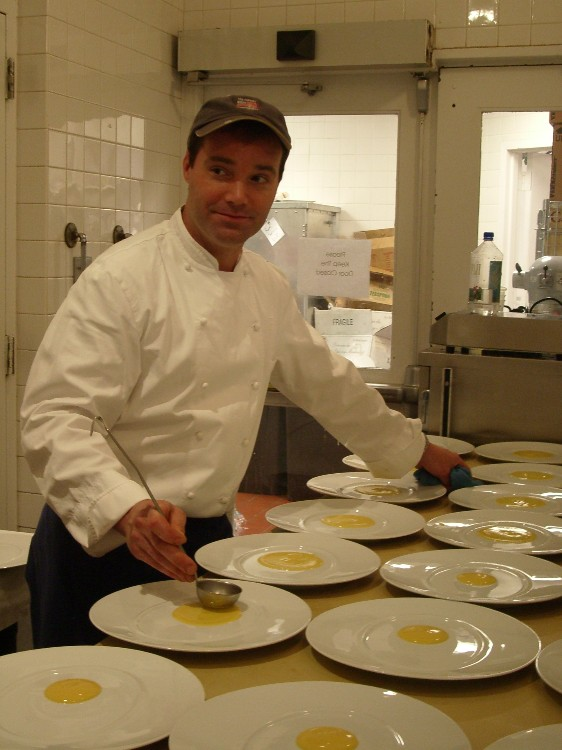
- Chef David Carmichael
- Born: July 9, 1970 (age 56); Bay Shore, New York, United States
- Education: Culinary Institute of America
- Culinary career
- Cooking style: Modern American Pastry
- Current restaurants
- Le Bernardin; Daniel, Vinegar factory Sign of the Dove; Lutéce; Oceana; Abbocatto; Gilt, Owner General Bakeshop
- Television shows
- The Today Show; The Food Network; Rosie O'Donnell Show

David Carmichael is an American chef, specializing in pastry. Born and raised in New York, he has run several pastry kitchens in many of Manhattan's finest restaurants. He currently works at Gilt restaurant, situated in the New York Palace Hotel. He is known for his salted milk chocolate ice cream and warm brownies.

== Background ==
Born in Bay Shore, New York, and raised in East Hampton, New York, David Carmichael began his culinary career by working at Ina Garten's Barefoot Contessa speciality food store. While attending East Hampton High School, Carmichael worked his way to the pastry chef position at the store before graduating from school in 1988. Following on from high school, he made his decision to commit to a career in pastry and attended the Culinary Institute of America, graduating in 1990.

== Notable restaurants ==
Immediately following graduation at the Culinary Institute, Carmichael began his restaurant career at Manhattan's Le Bernardin in 1990. There he worked as a Pastry Sous Chef for three years. It was here that Carmichael experienced the influence of Francois Payard which "opened up the world of French technique and pastry to me".

In 1993, he moved from Le Bernardin to Daniel Boulud's first restaurant, Daniel, at the Surrey Hotel. Eli Zabar's Vinegar Factory followed in 1994 where Carmichael undertook his first restaurant Head Pastry Chef position. Next came Head Pastry Chef positions at the Sign of the Dove (1995–1996) and Lutéce, working with André Soltner (1996–1997).

In 1997, Carmichael took up the position of Head Pastry Chef at Oceana where he would remain in charge for ten years. The restaurant served as a platform to truly hone his skills and develop his own style of desserts, and also to capture the culinary media's attention, which resulted in a number of awards.

In 2007, he moved to Gilt Restaurant at the New York Palace Hotel where he has worked with Justin Bogle and Patrick Cappiello. On 8 October 2007, Gilt received a Michelin star and became the second restaurant, after Oceana, to receive a star with Carmichael as Head Pastry Chef.

== Awards ==
- Patisfrance US Pastry Competition – Outstanding Taste, 1998
- Chocolatier Magazine - Nation's Top Ten Pastry Chefs, 2004
- Pastry Art and Design Magazine - Nation's Top Ten Pastry Chefs, 2004

== Television ==
During his career, David Carmichael has made numerous television appearances on the Today Show, including baking the cake for Katie Couric's final appearance on the show. There have also been several segments on the Food Network and also an appearance on The Rosie O'Donnell Show.

== Notes ==
Gilt Restaurant: David Carmichael Profile Reuters Lifestyle The Today Show, NBC StarChefs Magazine
