= Theta Kappa Phi (sorority) =

Asian-interest sorority in California, US

- ΘΚΦ
- Coat of Arms of Theta Kappa Phi
- Founded: June 4, 1959; 67 years ago University of California, Los Angeles
- Type: Service
- Affiliation: Independent
- Status: Active
- Emphasis: Asian-interest
- Scope: Local
- Pillars: Faith, Love, and Trust
- Colors: Pink and White
- Chapters: 1
- Nickname: Thetas
- Headquarters: Los Angeles, California; United States
- Website: www.thetakappaphi.com

Theta Kappa Phi (ΘΚΦ) is an Asian-interest service sorority at the University of California, Los Angeles. It was established in 1959. The sorority is a member of the Southern California Asian Greek Council. There is also a Theta Kappa Phi chapter at the University of the South in Sewanee, Tennessee. It was founded in 1977 as the first sorority at Sewanee. Their colors are turquoise and yellow. They are not affiliated with the chapter at UCLA.

== History ==
After World War II, racial prejudice against Asian Americans, especially those of Japanese ancestry, was high along the West Coast of the United States. While a high school student, Margaret Ohara received a Panhellenic Scholarship to attend the University of California, Los Angeles (UCLA). However, when the UCLA Panhellenic panel discovered the freshmen student Ohara was Japanese-American, they "regretted that the woman they chose could not be invited to join any of the Greek society."

Ohara recruited eight other students to form an Asian sorority. The women were assisted by Mrs. Rex P. Enoch who had formed the UCLA chapter of Alpha Delta Pi and had previously visited Japan. The university recognized Theta Kappa Phi as a service sorority on June 4, 1959. Its purpose was "to promote friendship and service to the university and community and to further the scholastic achievements of its members."

The sorority's members were of Chinese, Japanese, and Korean ancestry. Its founders were Kyoko Fukimoto, Arleen Kondo, Janice Mirikitani, Margaret Ohara, Jane Osuga, Joan Ota, Ellen Shiayama, Misako Tomita, and Kathryn Yakura. Theta Kappa Phi's founding faculty advisor was Robert S. Kinsman who served in this capacity for 45 years. Kinsman was a professor of English who had studied Japanese and served in the Pacific Theater during World War II. Enoch was its Panhellenic advisor and sponsor.

The sorority's first volunteer activity was to paint the "C" in front of UCLA's Sproul Hall. During the 1960s, Theta Kappa Phi held campus programs about Japan served as hostesses for the Japan American Society's functions. It also had a position on the Keiro Nursing Home Collegaite Board. The sorority and its alumnae association's main philanthropy was the San-ai-en orphanage in Shikoku, Japan. During the Nisel Week Festival in 1966, the sorority and its alumnae held a fashion show to raise money for the orphanage. Sorority members also raised funds for UCLA's UniCamp.

Theta Kappa Phi is a member of the UCLA Asian Greek Council and the Southern California Asian Greek Council.

== Symbols ==
Theta Kappa Phi's pillars are Faith, Love, and Trust. Its members are called Thetas. Its colors are pink and white.

== Philanthropy ==
The sorority's main philanthropy is breast cancer awareness, raising funds by participating in the Revlon Run Walk and by holding Battle, an annual campus dance competition. Members also participate in beach cleanups and the UCLA Volunteer Day.

The UCLA Theta Kappa Phi Alumnae Association established the UCLA Theta Kappa Phi Alumnae Association Scholarship Fund at the university. It funds two annual scholarships for sorority members, the Dr. Robert S. Kinsman Scholar for Academic Achievement and the Margaret Ohara Shinohara Scholarship for Leadership and Service.

== Governance ==
The sorority's officers include the president, first vice president, second vice president, secretary, treasurer, chaplain, keeper of the insignia, and publicity-historian.

== See also ==
- Cultural interest fraternities and sororities
- List of Asian American fraternities and sororities
- List of social sororities and women's fraternities
