= Sigma Omicron Pi =

Asian American interest college sorority

- ΣΟΠ
- Founded: 1930; 96 years ago San Francisco State University
- Type: Social
- Affiliation: Independent
- Status: Active
- Emphasis: Cultural interest - Asian American
- Scope: National
- Pillars: Unity, Friendship, Leadership, Service
- Colors: Green and Gold
- Flower: Daisy
- Jewel: Pearl
- Chapters: 12
- Members: >1,000 lifetime
- Nickname: SOPi
- Headquarters: C/O 9450 Gilman Drive 10302; La Jolla, California 92092; United States

Sigma Omicron Pi (ΣΟΠ) is an Asian American interest sorority. Founded in 1930 at San Francisco State University, the college social organization has active chapters on twelve campuses in the United States. The stated objective of the sorority is to "further the awareness of women in Asian culture" and "to promote unity, lifelong friendships, leadership, and community service".

== History ==
In 1930, ten Asian American women came together on the campus of San Francisco State University to form a sorority for women who were interested in teaching. They adopted the Greek letters ΣΟΠ or Sigma Omicron Pi to represent "Sisters of Pedagogy". It was the first Chinese sorority on that campus. Elizabeth Ling-so Hall was a founder and the sorority's first president.

Sigma Omicron Pi expanded to the University of California, Berkeley campus in 1936. The sorority became active in the Asian community. Annually, they held a fashion show to raise scholarship money with the UC Chinese Alumni Association.

However, both chapters were forced to become inactive during World War II. Sigma Omicron Pi was revived at the University of California, Berkeley in 1946. The educational focus fell away, changing to providing fellowship, philanthropy, and cultural awareness for and among Asian American women of many Asian backgrounds.

In 1994, the sorority created an Inter-Chapter Council with six elected officers to help unite the various chapters. By 2025, the sorority had chartered fifteen chapters. Its national office is in La Jolla, California.

== Symbols ==
The Greek letters ΣΟΠ or Sigma Omicron Pi were selected to represent "Sisters of Pedagogy". The sorority's colors are green and gold. Its flower is the daisy and its jewel is the pearl.

== Chapters ==
Active chapters are in bold. Inactive chapters are in italics.

Chapter	Charter date and range	Institution	Location	Status	Ref.
Alpha Prime (See Beta)	1930–194x ?	San Francisco State University	San Francisco, California	Reissued	(Note: Chapter went dormant during World War II.)
**Alpha** (see Beta Prime)	1946	University of California, Berkeley	Berkeley, California	Active	(Note: Originally the Beta chapter that went inactive during World War II. After the war, the Berkeley chapter was reformed and named Alpha.)
Beta Prime (see Alpha)	1936–194x ?	University of California, Berkeley	Berkeley, California	Reissued	(Note: Chapter went dormant during World War II and was reformed as Alpha after the war.)
**Beta** (see Alpha Prime)	1988	San Francisco State University	San Francisco, California	Active	(Note: Reforming of the original Alpha chapter which went inactive during WWII.)
**Gamma**	1992	San Jose State University	San Jose, California	Active	
**Delta**	February 6, 1993	University of California, Davis	Davis, California	Active	
**Epsilon**	1993	California State University, Sacramento	Sacramento, California	Active	
**Zeta**	1995	University of California, Santa Cruz	Santa Cruz, California	Active	
Eta	1997-2000	University of Maryland, College Park	College Park, Maryland	Inactive	
**Theta**	2001	University of California, Irvine	Irvine, California	Active	
**Iota**	2001	Pennsylvania State University	University Park, Pennsylvania	Active	
**Kappa**	2002	University of California, San Diego	San Diego, California	Active	
Lambda	2002	Johns Hopkins University	Baltimore, Maryland	Inactive	
Mu	2003	University of California, Riverside	Riverside, California	Inactive	
**Nu**	2008	Binghamton University	Binghamton, New York	Active	

== Notable members ==
- Tiffany Lam – Miss Hong Kong 2002, Miss Chinese International 2003 runner up, and TVB actress

== See also ==
- List of social sororities and women's fraternities
- List of Asian American fraternities and sororities
- Cultural interest fraternities and sororities
