= Chi Delta Theta =

American collegiate Asian-American Interest sorority

- ΧΔΘ
- Founded: October 13, 1989; 36 years ago University of California, Santa Barbara
- Type: Social
- Affiliation: Independent
- Status: Active
- Emphasis: Cultural - Asian-American interest
- Scope: Regional
- Colors: Pink and Silver
- Symbol: Fan
- Flower: Orchid
- Chapters: 8
- Headquarters: Santa Barbara, California; United States
- Website: www.chideltathetasorority.com

Chi Delta Theta (ΧΔΘ) (also Chi Delt) is an Asian-American Interest sorority based in California. The organization strives to promote sisterhood, community service, academics, cultural awareness and social activity in the lives of its members.

== History ==
=== Establishment ===
Chi Delta Theta was established at the University of California, Santa Barbara on October 13, 1989, by Alison Suto and Joanne Yamaoka. With nineteen founding members, Chi Delta Theta became the first Asian-American interest sorority to be recognized by the university.

=== Founding Mothers ===
Alison Suto and Joanne Yamaoka along with seventeen founding sisters formed the Alpha chapter of Chi Delta Theta, the first Asian-American interest sorority on the University of California, Santa Barbara campus.

- Joanne Kato (Yamaoka)
- Alison Stripling (Suto)
- Caroline Chang
- Wei-Fang Chen
- Cheryl Chow
- Susan Fang
- Julie Goto
- Eiko Kato
- Gigi Liang
- Jain Lee
- Cynthia Matano
- Joy Murao
- Cheryl Ong
- Leslie Ong
- Junko Takahashi
- Jan Tashiro
- Joni Urasaki
- Kaying Vang
- Julie Wong

=== Expansion ===
Additional chapters were soon established, and growth has continued over the following 30 years.

Chi Delta Theta's regional expansion began with a colony at Cal Poly, SLO which chartered as the Beta chapter in 1993. It reached Northern California with establishment of Epsilon chapter in 2000 at UC Davis. The sorority now has seven chapters and one colony, all in California. The organization is open to national expansion.

The sisterhood has exhibited steady growth and continued participation of alumnae members, with over 500 sisters across California. The organization prides itself continuing bonds among all members including alumnae and members of its chapters.

== Symbols and traditions ==
The colors of the sorority are Pink and Silver.
The official flower is the Orchid.
In certain printed and electronic media, including the official website, the sorority refers to members as "sxsters", perhaps in a nod to diversity.

== Chapters ==
These are the chapters of Chi Delta Theta. Active chapters and colonies are noted in bold, inactive chapters are noted in italics.

Chapter	Installed Date and Range	University	City	State	Status	Ref.
**Alpha** (**Α**)	October 13, 1989	University of California, Santa Barbara	Santa Barbara	CA	Active	
**Beta** (**Β**)	April 24, 1993	California Polytechnic State University, San Luis Obispo	San Luis Obispo	CA	Active	
Gamma (Γ)	April 30, 1999	Loyola Marymount University	Los Angeles	CA	Inactive	
Delta (Δ)	May 22, 1999	California State University, Long Beach	Long Beach	CA	Inactive	
Epsilon (Ε)	April 30, 2000	University of California, Davis	Davis	CA	Inactive	
**Zeta** (**Ζ**)	August 20, 2010	University of California, Los Angeles	Los Angeles	CA	Active	
**Eta** (**Η**)	August 18, 2018	California State University, Northridge	Northridge	CA	Active	
**Theta** (**Θ**)	April 24, 2022	University of California, San Diego	San Diego	CA	Active	

== See also ==
- List of Asian American fraternities and sororities
- List of social sororities and women's fraternities
- Cultural interest fraternities and sororities
