= Rho Delta Chi =

Asian-interest sorority at the University of California, Riverside

- ΡΔΧ
- Founded: January 17, 1991; 35 years ago University of California, Riverside
- Type: Social
- Affiliation: Independent
- Status: Active
- Scope: Regional
- Motto: "Together as One, Striving for Excellence"
- Pillars: Sisterhood, Scholastics, Service, Social
- Colors: Dusty Rose and Teal Green
- Symbol: Heart with a Halo on the Left Side
- Flower: White rose with red trim
- Mascot: White Dove
- Chapters: 5
- Headquarters: Riverside, California; United States
- Website: rhodeltachi.weebly.com/about-us.html

Rho Delta Chi (ΡΔΧ) (also known as "Rhos"), is an Asian-interest, but not Asian exclusive, sorority founded at the University of California, Riverside on January 17, 1991. This multicultural sorority that has chartered seven chapters in California and Texas.

== History ==
Rho Delta Chi was established on January 17, 1991 as the first Asian American sorority at the University of California, Riverside. The sorority was formed by fourteen women called Founding Mothers.

Its Founding Mothers are:

- Rose An
- Kathy Bak
- Janet Fukuhara
- Kim Hirano
- Christine Ige Shimane
- Sue Lee
- Jackie Phaphui
- Christine Sato Yamazaki
- Jina Song
- Mina Song
- Stephanie Tanaka Chang
- Stephanie Uchida Lee
- Lana Wong
- Min Yi Kim

== Symbols ==
The founding mothers of the Alpha chapter chose the Greek letters ΡΔΧ in hopes of bringing harmony among all ethnicities. These letters were also chosen to symbolically infer the Latin word "Pax", which means "peace" in English. The sorority's mascot is the white dove. Its colors are dusty rose and teal green. Its flower is a white rose with red trim.

The sorority's pillars are Sisterhood, Scholastics, Service, and Social. Its motto is "Together as One, Striving for Excellence".

=== Rho Chant ===
This sorority chant was drafted at the 2012 Rho Delta Chi National Convention through the collaboration of the Alpha, Beta, Delta, and Epsilon chapters. Although the national Rho Chant is used in every chapter, shorter variations may exist among individual chapters. The national Rho Chant is as follows:

Who are we?

Rho D.

D. What?

Delta Chi

One-Nine

Nine-One

Rise Together
Rhos Forever.

== Philanthropy ==
In 2016, Rho Delta Chi established a national philanthropy. Rho Delta Chi's national philanthropy is partnered with the American Lung Association (ALA).

== Chapters ==
Rho Delta Chi has four active chapters and one colony. Active chapters are indicated in bold, inactive chapters in italics.

Chapter	Charter date and range	Institution	Location	Status	Ref.
Alpha	January 17, 1991–2019	University of California, Riverside	Riverside, California	Inactive	
**Beta**	November 10, 1995	Texas A&M University	College Station, Texas	Active	
Gamma	November 9, 2002–20xx ?	University of California, San Diego	San Diego, California	Inactive	
**Delta**	May 21, 2005	University of the Pacific	Stockton, California	Active	
**Epsilon**	February 19, 2012	San Francisco State University	San Francisco, California	Active	
Zeta	February 2, 2013	California State University, Northridge	Northridge, California	Inactive	
**Eta**	July 13, 2013	The University of Texas at San Antonio	San Antonio, Texas	Colony	

== See also ==
- List of social fraternities and sororities
- List of Asian American fraternities and sororities
- Cultural interest fraternities and sororities
