= Rho Psi =

International Chinese culture society

- ΡΨ
- Founded: 1916; 110 years ago Cornell University
- Type: Social
- Affiliation: Independent
- Status: Active
- Emphasis: Chinese culture
- Scope: National
- Member badge
- Chapters: 2 active
- Headquarters: 16915 Thunder Road; Haymarket, Virginia 20169; United States
- Website: rhopsi.org

The Rho Psi Society (ΡΨ) is an honorary Greek letter fraternity for Chinese students. Although founded as a student society, it is no longer active at the collegiate level. The objectives of the society are to promote and perpetuate friendship among members; to develop congeniality and brotherhood in the fraternal life; and to cultivate the spirit of cooperation and self-sacrifice.

== History ==
Su Yu She, the (Society for Respecting Friends, 素友 pronounced "Soo-You" in English), was founded in 1916 at Cornell University in Ithaca, New York as a general club for male students of Chinese descent, with its Chinese name. Its purpose was promoting Chinese culture, community service, and developing Chinese American youth. The society's name was changed to Rho Psi Fraternity in 1918.

The founders, Chih Ping, L. N. Lau, Y. C. Yang, K. C. Lay, and C. K. Cheng, were all college students of Chinese origin. The founders of Rho Psi may have sought, but been excluded from the fraternities of the time. Still, it is more likely that they sought the formation of their group for cultural affinity when faced with a tiny population of collegians of the same ethnic background. Mirroring society, colleges and universities, housing and dining halls, and Greek Letter organizations were all more insular in Rho Psi's founding era. This common campus culture didn't shift toward a more integrated approach until the ethnic, religious, and racial social mixing that occurred with the massive return of more integration-minded GIs after WWII.

Rho Psi was the first club with Greek letters for Asian students in what is now the Ivy League. It was a pioneer, established long before most multicultural or cultural-affinity Greek Letter organizations. The Alpha chapter, which maintained a house, existed on the Cornell campus until 1931. Rho Psi became national in 1925 with the establishment of another chapter in New York City, and the fraternity gained international status in 1929 with a chapter in Shanghai. It appears in many editions of Baird's Manual of American College Fraternities.

At its 1976 convention in State College, Pennsylvania, Su Yu She adopted the name Rho Psi Society, and at the same time, voted that women would be admitted to membership. In 2009, Rho Psi was rechartered at the University of Alabama as the Sigma chapter.

== Symbols ==
The name Su Yu She is Chinese for "pure and genuine friendship".

== Chapters ==
Chapters of Rho Psi include the following, with active chapters in bold and inactive chapters in italics.

Chapter	Charter date and range	Institution or area	Location	Status	Ref.
Alpha	1916–1931	Cornell University	Ithaca, New York	Inactive	
Beta	1925–19xx ?	Citywide	New York City, New York	Inactive	
Gamma	1926	Citywide	Philadelphia, Pennsylvania	Inactive	
Delta	1928	Harvard University	Cambridge, Massachusetts	Inactive	
Delta	1928	Massachusetts Institute of Technology	Cambridge, Massachusetts	Inactive	
	1929	Citywide	Shanghai, China	Inactive	
Epsilon	1948	University of Illinois	Urbana, Illinois	Inactive	
Zeta	1948	University of Wisconsin	Madison, Wisconsin	Inactive	
Eta	1950	University of Hawaii	Manoa, Honolulu, Hawaii	Inactive	
Theta	1953	University of Chicago	Chicago, Illinois	Inactive	
**Iota**	1955	Greater Washington, D.C. area	Baltimore, Maryland	Active	
**Iota**	1955	Greater Washington, D.C. area	Washington, D.C.	Active	
Kappa	1957	Citwide	Pittsburgh, Pennsylvania	Inactive	
Lambda	1959	Southern Connecticut area	New Haven, Connecticut	Inactive	
Lambda	1959	Yale University	New Haven, Connecticut	Inactive	
**Mu**	19xx ?	Citywide	San Francisco, California	Active	
Sigma	19xx ?–19xx ?, 2009–20xx ?	University of Alabama	Tuscaloosa, Alabama	Inactive	

== See also ==
- List of social fraternities
- List of Asian American fraternities and sororities
- Cultural interest fraternities and sororities
