= Kappa Zeta Phi =

Asian-American interest sorority

- ΚΖΦ
- Founded: December 1960; 65 years ago California State University, Los Angeles
- Type: Social
- Affiliation: Independent
- Status: Active
- Emphasis: Asian Interest
- Scope: Local (Southern California)
- Motto: "Happiness, Trusting Friendship, Lasting Memories"
- Colors: Alpha Aqua Blue and White; Beta Magenta and White; Gamma Aqua Blue and White
- Symbol: Infinity symbol
- Flower: White rose
- Chapters: 3
- Headquarters: , California; United States
- Website: www.kappazetaphi.com

Kappa Zeta Phi (ΚΖΦ) (also known as Kappas) is an Asian-American interest sorority based in Southern California. It was founded at California State University, Los Angeles in December 1960 and has expanded to two other universities within Southern California.

== History ==
Eight students at California State University, Los Angeles established Kappa Zeta Phi as an Asian American sorority in December 1960. The sorority received its charter in May 1962 and was recognized on campus as a service and social sorority by the Inter-Organizational Council. It is a member of the Southern California Asian Greek Council.

Its member volunteered on campus, providing tours for potential students. It also collaborated with the Japanese American Society of Southern California to host cultural events, such as Japanese tea ceremonies.

The Beta chapter was colonized by five founding members at the University of California, Irvine, on November 1, 1989. It was chartered on January 13, 1990. Beta is a member of the Multicultural Greek Council and the Asian Greek Council (AGC) of Southern California.

Gamma chapter was founded at the University of California, San Diego on April 25, 1994. It is a member of the Multicultural Greek Council.

== Symbols ==
The sorority's flower is the white rose. Its symbol is the infinity symbol. Its motto is "Happiness, Trusting Friendship, Lasting Memories". Each chapter has its own colors. Alpha's colors are aqua blue and white, Beta's are magenta and white, and Gamma's are aqua blue and white.

== Activities ==
Kappa Zeta Phi prioritizes community service above many other activities. Its philanthropy is the A3M Bone Marrow Drive.

== Chapters ==
Kappa Zeta Phi has three chapters.

Chapter	Charter date	Institution	Location	Status	Ref.
Alpha	December 1960	California State University, Los Angeles	Los Angeles, California	Active	
Beta	January 13, 1990	University of California, Irvine	Irvine, California	Inactive	
Gamma	April 25, 1994	University of California, San Diego	San Diego, California	Active	

== See also ==
- List of social fraternities and sororities
- List of Asian American fraternities and sororities
- Cultural interest fraternities and sororities
