= Gakusei Kai =

Living society at the University of Southern California

- GAK
- Founded: 1920; 105 years ago University of Southern California
- Type: Cultural interest
- Affiliation: Independent
- Status: Active
- Emphasis: Japanese
- Scope: Local
- Colors: Cardinal and Gold
- Chapters: 1
- Nickname: GAK House
- Headquarters: 727 West 30th Street; Los Angeles, California 90007; United States

Gakusei Kai (学生会/學生會(kyujitai), Gakuseikai), also spelled as Gakusei-Kai, is a coed independent living society at the University of Southern California in Los Angeles, California. It was originally formed in 1920 as a college social fraternity for Japanese students but evolved to include other ethnicities and women in the 1980s. This self-sustaining property provides affordable housing for low-income students.

== History ==
The Japanese Student Club was formed at the University of Southern California in Los Angeles, California in the 1910s as a Japanese fraternity with the support of the Japanese Young Men's Association (JYMA). Its founders were students Kiichi Iwanaga, Yukiro Miyata, Takeo Momita, and Gongoro Nakamura. Their intent was to provide affordable housing to the small Japanese-American student population and to promote education for Japanese immigrants who were non-traditional college students. It also provide a fraternity for students who were excluded from the traditional white fraternities. It was incorporated as Gakusei Kai, also spelled Gakusei-Kai, in 1920.

The fraternity recruited new members with its Japanese Student Night. Its members participated in intercollegiate athletics, dancing, and social activities. Gakusei Kai was organized into departments that managed athletics, forensic, library, and social relations. With the help of Los Angeles community leaders, the group campaigned across Southern California to raise funds to purchase a three-story house next to the USC campus in 1901. It was located on 928 West 35th Street in Los Angeles, where USC's Heritage Hall is located today.

The fraternity purchased a second house on an adjoining lot, adding thirteen more accommodations for a total of 32 available spots. However, the university bought several lots in the 1930s to expand the campus, including the Gakusei Kai houses. As compensation for the loss of their facilities, the university offered the students another home located on Trojan Fraternity Row at 727 West 30th Street in Los Angeles. Funds were raised to renovate and expand the house so it could accommodate more students. It was overseen by alumni trustees Ernest S. Fukuda, Masao Igasaki, Taro Kano, Gongoro Nakapiura, and Jihn M. Yahiro.

As the United States' involvement in World War II grew, persons of Japanese ancestry were removed from their homes and relocated to internment camps across the country, including several members of Gakusei Kai. Consequently, the Gakusei Kai became inactive and the house was abandoned and reclaimed by the university. During the students' absence, the structure was leased to another fraternity. Upon the return of the Japanese students in 1946, USC returned the house to the group, and Gakusei Kai was reestablished.

The fraternity began to accept non-Japanese members and female members in the 1980s. An alumnus purchased the house from the university and fully paid off its mortgage, allowing all rent to go toward utilities and maintenance of the house.

Gakusei Kai is a self-sustained property that provides affordable housing income for University of Southern California students with low incomes. The Gakusei Kai house can accommodate fifteen students in its ten-bedroom facility.

== Symbols ==
Gakusei Kai's colors are Cardinal and gold, mirroring the colors of the University of Southern California. Its nickname is the GAK House.

== Membership ==
While the organization was traditionally Japanese, students of all ethnicities are welcome to apply for membership. Applicants are interviewed by current residents and must receive a seventy percent vote to be admitted.

== Governance ==
The house is operated by the students who take care of paying its bills, cleaning, and repairs. Elected officers include a president, vice president of operations, vice president of communications, vice president of human relations, vice president of chores, and treasurer. Members attend monthly meeting and complete weekly chores.

== Notable members ==
- Masao Dodo, editor of the Japanese Daily News and Rafu Shimpo, the largest Japanese daily in Los Angeles; author; and activist for Japanese American education

== See also ==
- Cultural interest fraternities and sororities
- Japanese-American life before World War II
- List of Asian American fraternities and sororities
