= Miss Chinese International Pageant 2003 =

- Date: January 25, 2003
- Presenters: Priscilla Ku, Sonjia Kwok, Cutie Mui, Louis Yuen
- Entertainment: Kelly Chen, Sonjia Kwok, Michelle Ye
- Venue: TVB City, Hong Kong
- Broadcaster: TVB
- Entrants: 20
- Placements: 5
- Winner: Rachel Tan; Kuala Lumpur, Malaysia
- Congeniality: Lola Gong; Amsterdam, Netherlands

The 15th anniversary of the pageant, Miss Chinese International Pageant 2003 was held on January 25, 2003 in Hong Kong. TVB of Hong Kong broadcast and distributed the pageant worldwide. In the end, Miss Chinese International 2002 Shirley Zhou of Vancouver, British Columbia, Canada crowned Rachel Tan of Kuala Lumpur, Malaysia as the new winner.

== Pageant information ==
The theme to this year's pageant is "Snow Reflects Beauty in Different Colours, Chinese Beauty of Fifteen Years" 「雪映佳人放異彩 華裔艷倩十五年」. The Masters of Ceremonies include Priscilla Ku, Sonjia Kwok, Cutie Mui, and Louis Yuen. Special performing guests were cantopop singer Kelly Chen, Miss Chinese International 1999, Michelle Ye and Miss Chinese International 2000 Sonjia Kwok.

== Results ==
Placement	Contestant	City Represented	Country Represented
Miss Chinese International 2003	Rachel Tan 陳泳錦	Kuala Lumpur	Malaysia
1st Runner-Up	Tiffany Lam 林敏俐	Hong Kong	Hong Kong
2nd Runner-Up	Diana Wu 吳丹	Toronto	Canada
Top 5 Finalists	Kullaya Duangmanee (KUN) 陳美鳳; Susie Wang 汪鑫	Bangkok; Sydney	Thailand; Australia

=== Special awards ===
- Miss Friendship: Lola Gong 龔弦君 (Amsterdam)
- Miss Snow Vitality: Grace Lee 李景熙 (Manila)

== Contestant list ==
No.	Contestant Name	Represented City	Represented Country	Age	Chinese Origin
1	Kelly CHING 程嘉怡	Calgary	Canada	18	Zhongshan
2	Kullaya DUANGMANEE 陳美鳳	Bangkok	Thailand	22	Fujian
3	Tanya RATTRAY 羅珮琪	Melbourne	Australia	20	Taipei
4	Angela LU 陸韻	Montréal	Canada	22	Shanghai
5	Rachel TAN 陳泳錦	Kuala Lumpur	Malaysia	20	Fujian
6	Linna DU 杜林娜	Johannesburg	South Africa	21	Beijing
7	May TEO 張美茹	Los Angeles	USA	20	Taipei
8	Annie MA 馬安妮	Seattle	USA	23	Guangdong
9	Lola GONG 龔弦君	Amsterdam	Netherlands	21	Zhejiang
10	Diana WU 吳丹	Toronto	Canada	18	Xi'an
11	Patty WONG 王少玲	Lima	Peru	23	Guangdong
12	Jessica LOUSSAN 劉鈴燕	Tahiti	French Polynesia	20	Hakka
13	Angeline CHANG 曾㛢雰	Singapore	Singapore	19	Chaoyang
14	Jessie LIU 劉美誼	New York City	USA	21	Guangdong
15	Annie WANG 王燁希	Vancouver	Canada	21	Beijing
16	Susie WANG 汪鑫	Sydney	Australia	18	Taipei
17	Grace LEE 李景熙	Manila	Philippines	20	Suzhou
18	Pamela CHANG 張少英	Brisbane	Australia	19	Taipei
19	Monique XU 徐曉力	Chicago	USA	25	Shanghai
20	Tiffany LAM 林敏俐	Hong Kong	Hong Kong	22	Xinhui
