= Psi Chi Omega =

Asian American interest fraternity

- ΨΧΩ
- Founded: January 24, 1992; 34 years ago University of California, San Diego
- Type: Social
- Affiliation: Independent
- Status: Active
- Emphasis: Asian-Americans
- Scope: Regional
- Pillars: Integrity, Perseverance, and Eternal Brotherhood
- Colors: Forest green and Midnight Black
- Chapters: 4 active
- Nickname: Psi Chis, PXO, PCO
- Headquarters: San Diego, California; United States

Psi Chi Omega (ΨΧΩ), is an Asian American interest fraternity founded in 1992 at the University of California, San Diego. It has chartered six chapters in California.

== History ==
On January 24, 1992, Psi Chi Omega was founded at the University of California, San Diego. It was established as an Asian interest fraternity. The fraternity was recognized by the university on January 27, 1992 and joined the UCSD Multi-Cultural Greek Council three days later, on January 27, 1992.

The fraternity's 26 founders were:

- Thomas Butalid
- Gerard Carvalho
- Kyung Cho
- Robert De Guzman
- Ridel Del Rosario
- Tai Do
- Tommy Do
- Domingo Hallare
- Koji Kubono
- Doug Nguyen
- Vu Nguyen
- Hoai Pham
- Huy Pham
- Kim Phung
- Martin Regalado
- Eric Sanez
- Nick Sanez
- Timothy Tat
- Frank Tran
- John Tran
- Nam Tran
- Phuong Tran
- Thai Vo
- Toan Vuong

Psi Chi Omega's Beta chapter was installed on November 13, 1992 at University of California, Riverside. Gamma chapter at the University of California, Davis started as a colony on February 20, 1996, and was formally installed on January 24, 1997.

Its newest chapter, Zeta chapter, was installed on September 25, 2016 at San Francisco State University.

== Symbols ==
The fraternity's colors are forest green and midnight black. Its pillars are Integrity, Perseverance, and Eternal Brotherhood.

Psi Chi Omega's nicknames are Psi Chis, PXO, and PCO.

== Activities ==
The brothers of Psi Chi Omega participate in activities ranging from community service to intramural sports. The brothers participate annually in community service projects, such as, Trick-O-Canning for the local food bank, Relay for Life, Muscle Dystrophy Association Walk and Chili Cook Off, Asian Heritage Street Festival, and the San Diego Asian Film Festival.

Most recently, Psi Chi Omega partnered with a non-profit organization called Viral Hepatitis Foundation, to raise awareness about the spread of viral hepatitis worldwide.

== Chapters ==
Psi Chi Omega chapters, listed in order founded. Active chapters noted in bold, inactive chapters noted in italics.

Chapter	Charter date and range	Institution	Location	Status	Ref.
**Alpha**	January 24, 1992	University of California, San Diego	San Diego, CA	Active	
Beta	November 13, 1992 – 20xx ?	University of California, Riverside	Riverside, CA	Inactive	
Gamma	January 24, 1997	University of California, Davis	Davis, CA	Inactive	
Delta	xxxx–2005	University of California, Santa Cruz	Santa Cruz, CA	Inactive	(Note: Chapter was dismissed by the university in 2005 for risk management violations, including hazing.)
Epsilon	March 11, 2012	San Jose State University	San Jose, CA	Inactive	(Note: Chapter is not recognized by the university.)
**Zeta**	September 25, 2016	San Francisco State University	San Francisco, CA	Active	

== See also ==
- List of social fraternities and sororities
- List of Asian American fraternities and sororities
- Cultural interest fraternities and sororities
