= Chi Alpha Delta =

Asian American collegiate sorority

- ΧΑΔ
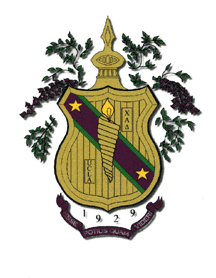
- Founded: April 5, 1929; 96 years ago University of California, Los Angeles
- Type: Social
- Affiliation: Independent
- Status: Active
- Emphasis: Asian-American
- Scope: Local
- Motto: Esse Potius Quam Videri
- Colors: Green and Lavender
- Symbol: Stars, knight's hood, torch
- Flower: Wisteria
- Chapters: 1
- Headquarters: 105 Kerckoff Hall; 734 W Adams Blvd; Los Angeles, CA 90007; United States
- Website: chialphadelta.com

Chi Alpha Delta (ΧΑΔ) (also XAD or Chis) is the oldest Asian-American cultural interest sorority in the United States. It was founded and chartered at University of California, Los Angeles (UCLA) in 1928.

Chis are one of the three Asian-American interest sororities and/or fraternities at UCLA, with the others being Theta Kappa Phi, and Omega Sigma Tau.

== History ==
Chi Alpha Delta was founded in 1928 at UCLA by Helen Tomio Mizuhara and Alyce Asahi. The sorority original members were fourteen Japanese-American students. They were Lillian Shizuko Ando, Rosa Ando, Chieko Goh, Fumi Iwasaki, Yone Kawatsu, Haruyo Komai, Tomiko Kusayanagi, Pauline Yuri Masuda, Mary Aiko Mizue, Shizue Morey, Alice (Asahi) Ohama, Haruko Ruth Saito, Helen Kiyoko Tomio, and Yone Tomio.

On April 5, 1929, the sorority was officially recognized by UCLA. In 2002, the sorority had 65 members, of which less than 10% are Japanese.

The sorority was founded due to racism and segregation. The 14 Japanese-American students were rejected from a Panhellenic Greek sorority, so they decided to form one for Japanese women and those of other Asian descents. These women created Chis because they felt the need for "a same-sex, same-race organization in order to feel at home in the university." Throughout the years Chis have accepted women of all Asian ethnicities into its sisterhood in hopes that its original purpose would not be forgotten but passed on from one generation to the next.

In the 1940s, during the yearly Faculty Tea, members wore kimonos and used Japanese styles to fix up their hair. During the 1940s, members were primarily second-generation Japanese Americans (Nisei) who conversed in English. From 1942 to 1945, the sorority was rendered inactive due to World War II. In 1946, after the war, Chi Alpha Delta was reorganized.

Members of the sorority celebrate their Asian-American identity through food and fashion with traditions such as cooking foods from different countries and hosting fashion shows to recruit new members.

== Symbols ==
Chi Alpha Delta's official colors are lavender for graciousness and green for thoughtfulness. These colors come from their sorority flower, Wisteria. Its symbols are stars, a knight's hood, and a torch. Its motto is Esse Potius Quam Videri.

== Philanthropy ==
The sorority's main philanthropy is with the Center for Pacific Asian Family, a women's shelter that assists women who are affected by domestic violence or sexual assault. By extending the strength of sisterhood, Chis seek to empower other women in the Asian American community.

== See also ==
- List of social fraternities and sororities
- List of Asian American fraternities and sororities
- Cultural interest fraternities and sororities
