= Chi Rho Omicron =

American Filipino social fraternity

- ΧΡΟ
- Founded: February 16, 1995; 31 years ago California State University, Fresno
- Type: Social
- Affiliation: Independent
- Status: Active
- Emphasis: Filipino
- Scope: Regional (California)
- Motto: Mg Lalaking Kagalanggalang "Respectful Young Gentlemen"
- Pillars: Academics, Brotherhood, Culture, Community
- Colors: Blue and Black
- Chapters: 10
- Members: 700 + lifetime
- Headquarters: 4049 Fawn Circle; Sacramento, California 95823; United States

Chi Rho Omicron (ΧΡΟ) is a Filipino-based fraternity founded in 1995 at California State University, Fresno. It has chartered ten chapters in California.

== History ==
Chi Rho Omicron was founded on February 16, 1995, on the campus of California State University, Fresno. Its seven Founding Fathers were Joseph L. Bautista, Florencio G. Costales Jr., Mark E. Dolor, Wenceslao Oscar Gonzales III, Jay R. Ladran, Alberto E. Palma Jr., and Augustine C. Tuliao Jr.

The fraternity was created to strengthen Filipino unity by removing the divisions between regions, class levels, and language barriers. However, men from every culture are welcome to join the fraternity. Its mission is "to promote the understanding, enrichment, and appreciation of the Pilipino culture, history, and heritage through a brotherhood/family environment; to instill the desire for self-improvement, scholastic excellence, and the cultivation for civic responsibility."

Soon after its creation and official recognition by the university, Chi Rho Omicron expanded with Beta chapter at San Francisco State University on February 16, 1997. Other colonies were established, resulting in eight additional chapters being chartered elsewhere in California.

The fraternity was incorporated in the State of California on March 24, 2006. Since its founding, Chi Rho Omicron has initiated more than 700 members.

== Symbols ==
Chi Rho Omicron's motto is Mg Lalaking Kagalanggalang or "Respectful Young Gentlemen". Its pillars are Academics, Brotherhood, Culture, and Community. Its colors are blue and black.

== Philanthropy ==
The fraternity's community service projects tend to have a link to the Filipino community. Projects include supporting the equity for Filipino World War II veterans and the reconstruction of the International Hotel in San Francisco. The fraternity raises funds for the Pinoy/Pinay Educational Program, providing school supplies and Filipino history books to elementary students in San Francisco. The fraternity also hosts Filipino Heritage Week activities on campus and in its various communities.

== Chapters ==
Following is a list of Chi Rho Omicron chapters, with active chapters indicated in bold and inactive chapters in italics.

Chapter	Charter date and range	Institution	Location	Status	Ref.
Alpha	February 16, 1995 – 2016	California State University, Fresno	Fresno, California	Inactive	
**Beta**	February 16, 1997	San Francisco State University	San Francisco, California	Active	
Gamma		California State University, East Bay	Hayward, California	Inactive	
Delta	199x ?–202x ?	University of San Francisco	San Francisco, California	Inactive	
Epsilon	May 18, 1998 - October 6, 2022	California State University, Sacramento	Sacramento, California	Inactive	
Zeta	June 28, 1999 – March 20, 2023	University of California, Davis	Davis, California	Inactive	(Note: Formed as a colony in 1999. In 2015, the chapter lost its registration with the university for at least five years for hazing.)
**Eta**	June 2, 2000	California State Polytechnic University, Pomona	Pomona, California	Active	
**Theta**	May 11, 2008	San Diego State University	San Diego, California	Active	(Note: Formed as a colony in 2008. This chapter has not been officially recognized by San Diego State University for some ten years but is still operating as of the fall of 2022.)
Iota	November 20, 2014 – 2022	California State University, Long Beach	Long Beach, California	Inactive	(Note: Chapter started as a colony)
**Kappa**	October 21, 2019	University of California, Irvine	Irvine, California	Inactive	

== See also ==
- List of social fraternities and sororities
- List of Asian American fraternities and sororities
- Cultural interest fraternities and sororities
