= Asian Americans in science and technology =

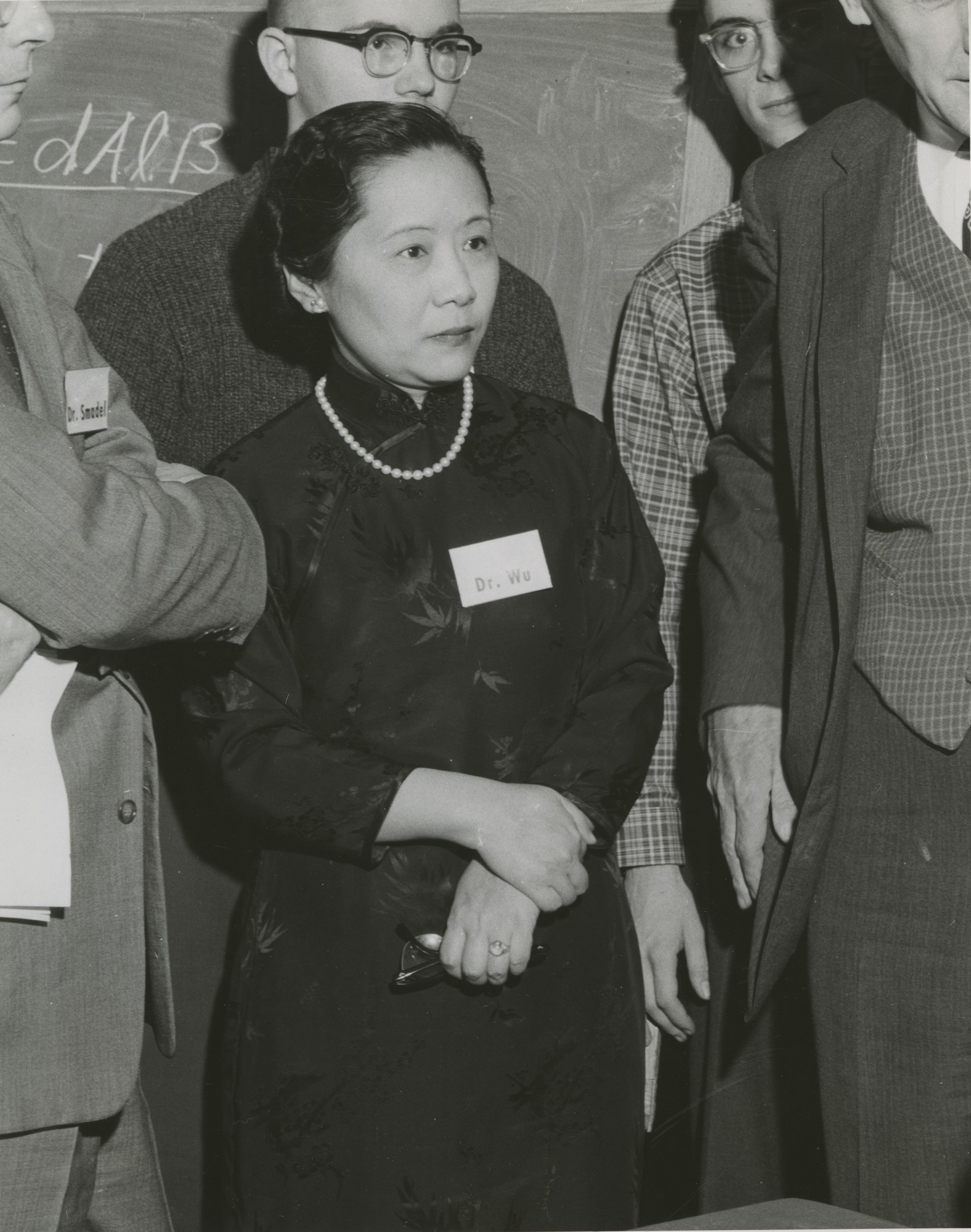
Chien-Shiung Wu in 1958

Asian Americans have made many notable contributions to science, technology, engineering, and mathematics (STEM) fields.

Chien-Shiung Wu was known to many scientists as the "First Lady of Physics" and played a pivotal role in experimentally demonstrating the violation of the law of conservation of parity in the field of particle physics. Fazlur Rahman Khan, also known as named as "The Father of tubular designs for high-rises", was highlighted by President Barack Obama in a 2009 speech in Cairo, Egypt, and has been called "Einstein of Structural engineering". Min Chueh Chang was the co-inventor of the combined oral contraceptive pill and contributed significantly to the development of in vitro fertilisation at the Worcester Foundation for Experimental Biology. David T. Wong was one of the scientists credited with the discovery of ground-breaking drug Fluoxetine as well as the discovery of atomoxetine, duloxetine and dapoxetine with colleagues. Michio Kaku has popularized science and has appeared on multiple programs on television and radio.

== Award recipients ==
=== Physics ===
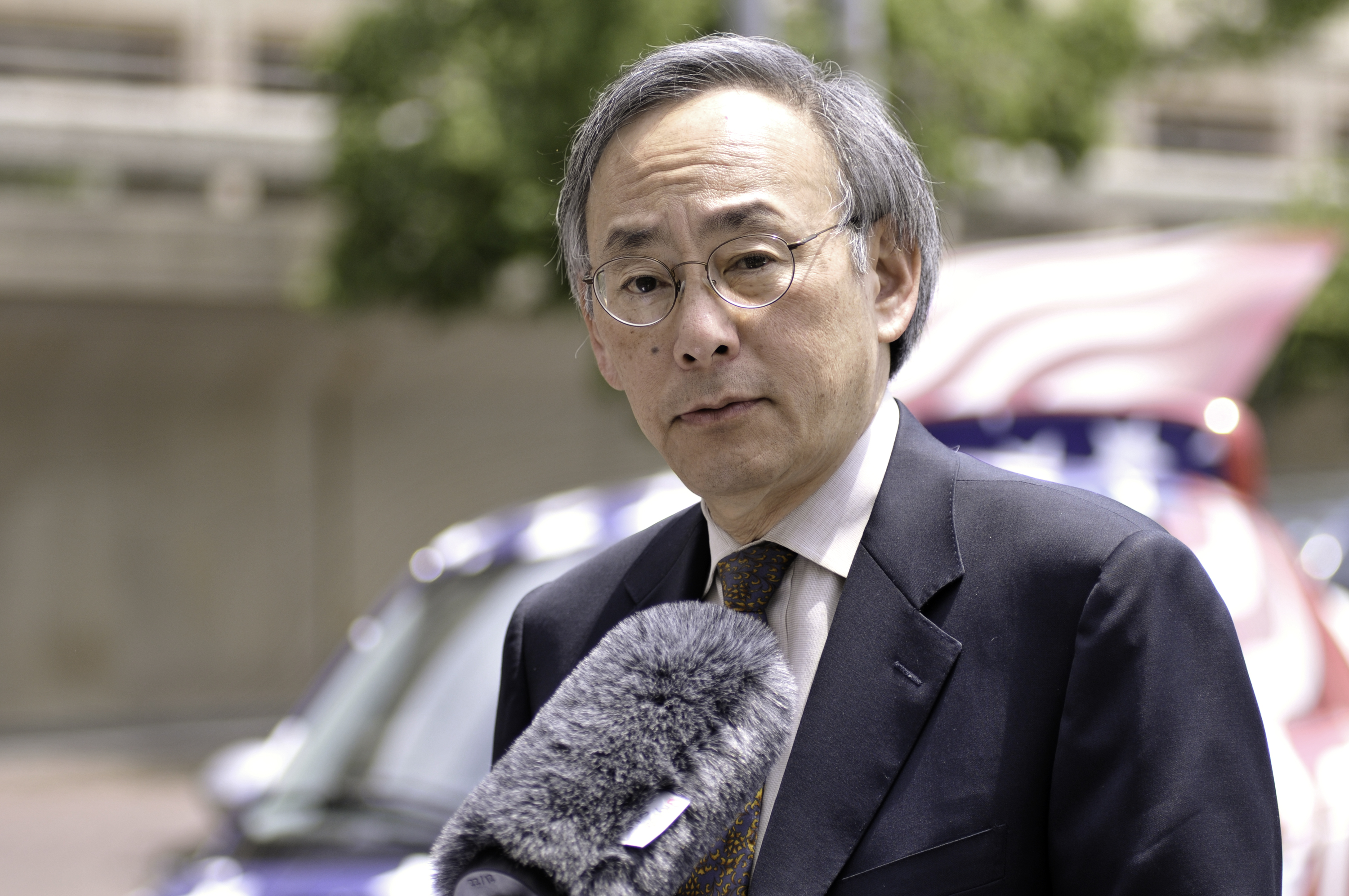
Physicist Steven Chu in 2011

Chinese immigrants Tsung-Dao Lee and Chen Ning Yang received the 1957 Nobel Prize in Physics for theoretical work demonstrating that the conservation of parity did not always hold and became American citizens in the early 1960s.

American born Samuel Chao Chung Ting received the 1976 Nobel Prize in physics for discovery of the subatomic particle J/ψ. Subrahmanyan Chandrasekhar shared the 1983 Nobel Prize in Physics and had the Chandra X-ray Observatory named after him. American born Steven Chu shared the 1997 Nobel Prize in Physics for his research in cooling and trapping atoms using laser light. Daniel Tsui shared the 1998 Nobel Prize in Physics in 1998 for helping discover the fractional Quantum Hall effect. Yoichiro Nambu received the 2008 Nobel Prize in Physics for his work on the consequences of spontaneously broken symmetries in field theories. In 2009, Charles K. Kao was awarded Nobel Prize in Physics "for groundbreaking achievements concerning the transmission of light in fibres for optical communication." Shuji Nakamura won the 2014 Nobel Prize in Physics for the invention of efficient blue light-emitting diodes. Syukuro Manabe received the 2021 Nobel Prize in Physics for his work modeling Earth’s climate. Abhay Ashtekar (born 5 July 1949) is an Indian theoretical physicist who created Ashtekar variables and is one of the founders of loop quantum gravity and its subfield loop quantum cosmology.

=== Chemistry ===
Charles J. Pedersen shared the 1987 Nobel Prize in chemistry for his methods of synthesizing crown ethers. In 2008, biochemist Roger Tsien won the Nobel in Chemistry for his work on engineering and improving the green fluorescent protein (GFP) that has become a standard tool of modern molecular biology and biochemistry. Venkatraman Ramakrishnan won the prize in Chemistry "for studies of the structure and function of the ribosome". Ching W. Tang was the inventor of the Organic light-emitting diode and Organic solar cell and was awarded the 2011 Wolf Prize in Chemistry for this achievement.

=== Mathematics ===
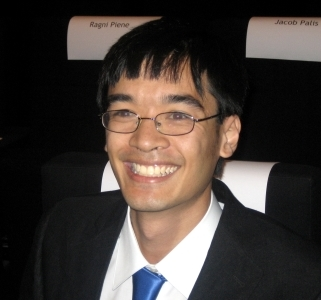
Mathematician Terence Tao in 2006

Chinese American mathematicians Shing-Tung Yau and Terence Tao both won the Fields Medal. The geometer Shiing-Shen Chern received the Wolf Prize in Mathematics in 1983. Manjul Bhargava, an American Canadian of Indian origins won the Fields Medal in 2014. Korean American June Huh won the Fields Medal in 2022. S. R. Srinivasa Varadhan (b. 1940), NYU mathematician who specialised in probability; winner of the Abel Prize and Steele Prize

Yitang Zhang is a Chinese-born American mathematician working in the area of number theory. While working for the University of New Hampshire as a lecturer, Zhang submitted an article to the Annals of Mathematics in 2013 which established the first finite bound on gaps between prime numbers, which led to a 2014 MacArthur award.

Harish-Chandra FRS (11 October 1923 – 16 October 1983) was an Indian-American mathematician and physicist who did fundamental work in representation theory, especially harmonic analysis on semisimple Lie groups.

=== Other ===
Har Gobind Khorana shared the 1968 Nobel Prize in Physiology or Medicine for his work in genetics and protein synthesis. Andrew Yao was awarded the Turing Award in 2000. In 1984, Dr. David D. Ho first reported the "healthy carrier state" of HIV infection, which identified HIV-positive individuals who showed no physical signs of AIDS. Yellapragada Subbarow was an Indian American biochemist who discovered the function of adenosine triphosphate (ATP) as an energy source in the cell, developed methotrexate for the treatment of cancer and led the department at Lederle laboratories in which Benjamin Minge Duggar discovered chlortetracycline in 1945. Raj Reddy is an Indian-American computer scientist and a winner of the Turing Award. He is one of the early pioneers of artificial intelligence and has served on the faculty of Stanford and Carnegie Mellon for over 50 years.

=== Space ===
LTC Ellison Onizuka became the first Asian American (and third person of East Asian descent) when he made his first space flight aboard STS-51-C in 1985. Onizuka later died aboard the Space Shuttle Challenger in 1986. Taylor Gun-Jin Wang became the first person of Chinese ethnicity and first Chinese American, in space in 1985; he has since been followed by Leroy Chiao in 1994, and Ed Lu in 1997. In 1986, Franklin Chang-Diaz became the first Asian Latin American in space. Eugene H. Trinh became the first Vietnamese American in space in 1992. In 2001, Mark L. Polansky, a Jewish Korean American, made his first of three flights into space. In 2003, Kalpana Chawla became the first Indian American in space, but died aboard the ill-fated Space Shuttle Columbia. She has since been followed by CDR Sunita Williams in 2006.
