= Rachel Tan =

Malaysian model

- Born: Rachel Tan Weng Kim; 5 May 1982 (age 44); Seremban, Negeri Sembilan, Malaysia
- Height: 5 ft 7 in (1.70 m)
- Beauty pageant titleholder
- Title: Miss Malaysia Chinese International 2002; Miss Chinese International 2003
- Major competitions: Miss Malaysia Chinese International 2002 (Winner); Miss Chinese International 2003 (Winner)

Rachel Tan

Chinese name
- Traditional Chinese: 陳泳錦
- Simplified Chinese: 陈泳锦
- Hanyu Pinyin: Chén Yǒngjǐn
- Jyutping: Can4 Wing6 Gam2
- Hokkien POJ: Tân Éng-kím

Rachel Tan Weng Kim, 陈泳锦, is a former Miss Chinese International who represented Kuala Lumpur, Malaysia when she captured the prestigious title in Hong Kong, in 2003. She was 20 when she competed and was the only Malaysian to ever hold the title, though Malaysian representatives have a striking track record in the pageant.

Tan was born on May 5, 1982, in Seremban, Negeri Sembilan, Malaysia. She has a bachelor's degree in law from University of Sheffield, and a master's degree in law from University of Cambridge.

Tan's Chinese origin is Fujian, and she speaks three languages: Cantonese, English and Malay.

== Miss Malaysia Chinese International 2002 ==
On November 9, 2002, Tan captured the title of Miss Malaysia Chinese International Pageant (now known as Miss Astro Chinese International pageant), an annual beauty pageant organized by Malaysia's premier satellite television station, ASTRO. She also won the Miss Photogenic Award. Her runners-up were July Lim Sze Chia and Tan Ling Ling.

Prior to winning the pageant, Tan walked away with a Kia Carnival MPV worth RM160,000, a cash prize of RM25,000 sponsored by Pan Malaysian Pools Sdn Bhd and other prizes. She also represented Malaysia in the Miss Chinese International Pageant 2003 which was held in January 2003.

== Miss Chinese International 2003 ==
Tan competed in the Miss Chinese International Pageant representing Kuala Lumpur. On 25 January 2003, she won the coveted title, beating out 12 other contestants.

== Education ==
Tan graduated from Convent Seremban High School where she was an active student who was involved in the Red Crescent Society and Leo's Club. She marked excellence in her academics as she scored 7As in her PMR examination (Lower Certificate of Education), 10A's (8 A1s, 2 A2s) in her SPM examination (Malaysia Certificate of Education).

After completing her A-levels, she did her first year at a local private college, Kemayan ATC in Kuala Lumpur before obtaining a scholarship to continue her studies at University of Sheffield in the United Kingdom.

After graduating from Sheffield, Tan studied her Masters in Law at University of Cambridge, and obtained a place at St Catharine's College from October 2005 to June 2006.

== Modelling and entertainment career ==
Tan had a part in a local sitcom, Homecoming, on ASTRO in 2003, and a role in the play Leslie, the Legend. She currently hosts the TV show Girls' Club on a local channel, NTV7.

Preceded by Angela Foo 符愫娛	Miss Malaysia Chinese International; 2002	Succeeded by Vivien Yeo 杨秀惠
Preceded by Shirley Zhou 周雪	Miss Chinese International; 2003	Succeeded by Linda Chung 鍾嘉欣
