= Xi Kappa =

American Asian-interest fraternity

- ΞΚ
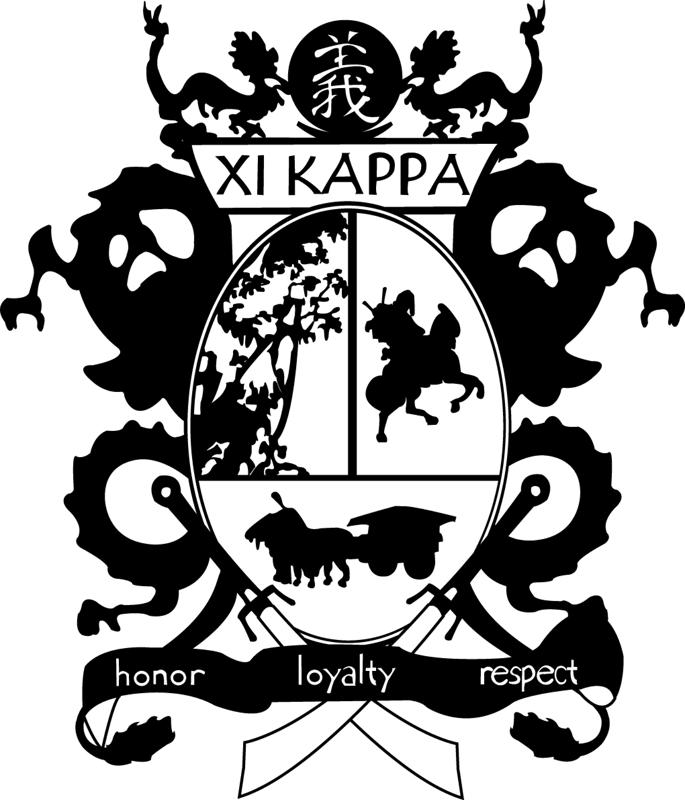
- Founded: February 28, 1998; 28 years ago University of Georgia
- Type: Social
- Affiliation: Independent
- Status: Active
- Emphasis: Asian-interest
- Scope: National
- Motto: "Men of Excellence"
- Pillars: Honor, Truth, Respect, Loyalty, Academics
- Colors: Royal Blue and Vegas Gold
- Philanthropy: Sexual Assault Prevention
- Chapters: 1 active
- Members: 13 active 300+ lifetime
- Headquarters: Atlanta, Georgia; United States
- Website: www.ugaxikappa.org

Xi Kappa Inc. (ΞΚ, also known as XK) is established as the first Asian-interest fraternity in the Southeast United States. Since its founding in 1998, it has chartered five chapters.

== History ==
Xi Kappa was founded by Jason Dunn, who wanted to address segregation within the Asian population and American culture. In 1997, Dunn recruited eight other Asian students at the University of Georgia to establish a regional fraternity for Asian students. They formed Xi Kappa Asian-Interest Fraternity on February 28, 1998. Its founders were Jason Dunn, Christian Deguzman, Howard Hsu, Eliot Kim, Sam Kim, Brian Le, Phong Nguyen, Trung Pham, and Ben Wong.

The Beta Chapter at Georgia Tech was established in 2008, followed by two other chapters in Georgia. The fraternity became national with the addition of Epsilon at Brandeis University in 2014. Around 2017, Xi Kappa had initiated 275 members and had 208 alumni.

Membership in Xi Kappa is open to all men interested in Asian American and Pacific Islander issues. Its national philanthropy is Sexual Assault Prevention. The fraternity's national headquarters is in Atlanta, Georgia.

== Symbols ==
Xi Kappa's motto is "Men of Excellence". Its pillars are Honor, Truth, Respect, Loyalty, and Academics. Its colors are royal blue and Vegas gold.

== Chapters ==
These are the chapters of Xi Kappa. Active chapters noted in bold, inactive chapters noted in italics.

| Name | Chartered | Institution | Location | Status | Reference |
|---|---|---|---|---|---|
| **Alpha** | February 28, 1998 | University of Georgia | Athens, Georgia | Active | |
| Beta | 2008–202x ? | Georgia Tech | Atlanta, Georgia | Inactive | |
| Gamma | 20xx ?–20xx ? | Georgia State University | Atlanta, Georgia | Inactive | |
| Delta | 2010–202x ? | Emory University | Atlanta, Georgia | Inactive | |
| Epsilon | 2014–20xx ? | Brandeis University | Waltham, Massachusetts | Inactive | |
| Omega | | | | Memorial | |

== See also ==
- :List of social fraternities
- List of Asian American fraternities and sororities
- Cultural interest fraternities and sororities
