= The Sign of the Dove (restaurant) =

- Interactive map of The Sign of the Dove

Restaurant information
- Established: 1962
- Closed: February 16, 1998
- Previous owner: Joseph Santo DDS
- Location: 1110 Third Avenue, Manhattan, New York
- Coordinates: 40°45′56″N 73°57′50″W

The Sign of the Dove was a fine dining restaurant on the Upper East Side of Manhattan which opened in 1962 by dentist Joseph Santo, which he designed himself.

The Santo Family Group sold the 65th Street and 3rd Avenue Property to Related Properties Ltd. who had plans for a mixed use highrise development. Since its closure, it has been considered "one of the lost gems of New York City".

Jessica Mitford wrote a less than flattering story about Sign of the Dove in 1977 for New York (magazine). Letters were sent saying Mitford was drunk and disorderly and it turns out the letters were written by someone doing PR work for Santo, and wrote about someone else without getting their permission and said it was her.

== Reviews ==
The New York Times, in one of their early reviews, praised the decor, saying it was "one of New York’s most enchanting restaurants", but the food was mediocre to very good and the table service was terrible. They became a destination place for special occasions like a wedding proposal, an anniversary dinner and Valentine's Day. They attracted what was described as an elite clientele, including a party in 1965 for John Kenneth Galbraith thrown by Jacqueline Kennedy Onassis. In an article published after the restaurant closed, the paper also said "for years (Ithaca one of Manhattan's most beloved dining spots."

Gael Greene wrote that it was overrated and for culinary snobs.
