= Larry Asera =

American engineer

Larry Asera, a Filipino American engineer, businessman, and politician, is the first Filipino American elected to public office in the US mainland. Born July 15, 1948, in Vallejo, California, he has served in a variety of public positions, including Deputy Secretary of State of California, chief legislative consultant to the California State Senate and California State Assembly, and "energy czar" of Vallejo, California. He is known for his work on alternative energy, particularly in the field of photovoltaic energy development, and is the recipient of the California Energy Commission's State Energy Technology Award and the US Department of Energy's Award for Innovation, among other state and international honors. He is the founder of Asera-Pacific Ltd. and Asera LLC.
