= List of Marquette University fraternities and sororities =

The Marquette University fraternity and sorority system offers organizations under the North American Interfraternity Conference (IFC), the National Pan-Hellenic Council (NPHC) and the National Panhellenic Conference (NPC). About 10% of the total undergraduate student body is active in Greek life.

Following is a list of Marquette University fraternities and sororities.

== IFC fraternities ==
There are eight fraternities at Marquette affiliated with the North American Interfraternity Conference (IFC).

- Delta Chi
- Delta Sigma Pi, a coeducational fraternity with a focus on business education
- Delta Tau Delta
- Kappa Sigma
- Sigma Chi
- Sigma Lambda Beta, a primarily Latin-American social fraternity
- Sigma Phi Delta, an engineering fraternity
- Sigma Phi Epsilon
- Triangle Fraternity, an engineering, science and architecture fraternity

== NPHC fraternities and sororities ==
All member fraternities and sororities of the National Pan-Hellenic Council (NPHC), including those at Marquette University, are historically made up primarily of African-American students. Those with chapters at Marquette include:

Fraternities:

- Alpha Phi Alpha
- Iota Phi Theta
- Kappa Alpha Psi
- Omega Psi Phi
- Phi Beta Sigma

Sororities:

- Delta Sigma Theta
- Alpha Kappa Alpha
- Sigma Gamma Rho
- Zeta Phi Beta

== NPC sororities ==
Nine of Marquette's Greek organizations are members of the National Panhellenic Conference (NPC). One of them, Alpha Omega Epsilon, an engineering sorority, was founded at Marquette.

- Alpha Chi Omega
- Alpha Omega Epsilon, a sorority for women in Engineering and Technical Science
- Alpha Phi
- Alpha Xi Delta
- Delta Xi Phi, a sorority dedicated to multicultural awareness
- Kappa Delta
- Pi Beta Phi
- Sigma Kappa
- Sigma Lambda Gamma, a historically Latina-based sorority.

== Greek organizations formerly at Marquette ==
There are several fraternities and sororities that once had chapters at Marquette. They include:

- Kappa Beta Gamma, the first sorority at Marquette. It still exists as an international sorority.
- Omega Delta, 2008-2016
- Sigma Sigma Sigma
- Gamma Phi Beta
- Alpha Epsilon Pi
- Alpha Kappa Psi
- Alpha Delta Gamma
- Phi Delta Theta
- Tau Kappa Epsilon
- Gamma Theta Pi
- Alpha Gamma Phi
- Phi Kappa Theta
