= List of Phi Kappa Theta chapters =

Phi Kappa Theta is an American social fraternity. It was founded at Ohio State University in Columbus, Ohio on April 29, 1959, by the merger of two Catholic fraternities, Phi Kappa and Theta Kappa Phi. Phi Kappa was founded in 1889 at Brown University in Providence, Rhode Island, while Theta Kappa Phi was founded later in October 1919 at Lehigh University in Bethlehem, Pennsylvania. In the following Phi Kappa Theta chapter list, active chapters and colonies are noted in bold, and inactive chapters are in italics.

Chapter	Charter date and range	Institution	City	State or province	Status	Ref.
Rhode Island Alpha	April 29, 1889 – 1930	Brown University	Providence	Rhode Island	Inactive	(Note: Pre-merger, this chapter came from Phi Kappa.)
**Illinois Beta Delta**	May 27, 1912 – 1999; 2016	University of Illinois	Champaign and Urbana	Illinois	Active	(Note: The Illinois Beta Delta chapter was formed with the April 29, 1959 merger of ΦΚ's Beta chapter (1912) and ΘΚΦ's Delta chapter (1923). The ΦΚ chapter had originally formed out of the Loyola Club (1909). The ΘΚΦ chapter had originally formed out of Phi Lambda Pi (local, 1921) on that campus.)
**Pennsylvania Beta Gamma**	November 7, 1913 – 1991; 1996	Pennsylvania State University	University Park	Pennsylvania	Active	(Note: The Pennsylvania Beta Gamma chapter was formed from the April 29, 1959 merger of ΦΚ's Gamma chapter (1913) and ΘΚΦ's Beta chapter (1922). The ΦΚ chapter had originally formed out of Sigma Phi Delta (local, 1909). The ΘΚΦ chapter had originally formed out of Kappa Theta (local, 1920) on that campus.)
Iowa Delta	March 14, 1914 – 1932; 1947–1963; 1989–2007; 2018	University of Iowa	Iowa City	Iowa	Inactive	
Kansas Epsilon	October 2, 1915 – 1933; 1947–2005	University of Kansas	Lawrence	Kansas	Inactive	
**Indiana Zeta**	February 11, 1918 – 2010; 2015–2019; 2025	Purdue University	West Lafayette	Indiana	Colony	
**Massachusetts Eta**	January 1, 1919 – 1937; 1941–1973; 1977	Massachusetts Institute of Technology	Cambridge	Massachusetts	Active	
Pennsylvania Alpha	October 1, 1919 – 2020	Lehigh University	Bethlehem	Pennsylvania	Inactive	(Note: In the case of Pennsylvania Alpha and other chapters gained in the merger of ΦΚ and ΘΚΦ, fraternities that were relatively equal in size, the naming convention allowed for two "Alpha chapters", further designated by state, to recognize their roles in establishing both nationals. This differs somewhat from a strict alphabetization scheme used elsewhere where only a single Alpha, a single Beta, etc., would be allowed. Thus the Fraternity also requires the name of the state in its chapter designations.) (Note: Pre-merger, this chapter came from ΘΚΦ.)
Ohio Gamma Theta	March 28, 1920 – 2018	Ohio State University	Columbus	Ohio	Inactive	(Note: The Ohio Gamma Theta chapter was formed with the April 29, 1959 merger of ΦΚ's Theta chapter (1920) and ΘΚΦ's Gamma chapter (1922). The ΦΚ chapter had originally formed out of the local Newman Club (1909). The ΘΚΦ chapter had originally formed out of Iota Lambda (local, 1920) on that campus. The fraternity's website announced plans for re-establishment in the Fall of 2025, accessed 26 Oct 2023.)
Kansas Iota	April 9, 1921 – 20xx ?; 2021–2024	Kansas State University	Manhattan	Kansas	Inactive	
**Wisconsin Lambda**	January 7, 1922 – 1937; 1946–1970; May 2, 2015	University of Wisconsin	Madison	Wisconsin	Active	(Note: The Wisconsin Lambda chapter came from ΦΚ, and its name did not change after the April 29, 1959 merger. However, it absorbed an unnamed colony of ΘΚΦ that at the merger was already five years old (1954-1959). The ΦΚ chapter had originally formed out the Loyola Club (1920). The ΘΚΦ colony was never chartered.)
Pennsylvania Mu	May 20, 1922 – 2019	University of Pittsburgh	Pittsburgh	Pennsylvania	Inactive	
**Missouri Kappa Upsilon**	July 7, 1922 – 1935; 1948–199?; 199?	University of Missouri	Columbia	Missouri	Active	(Note: The Missouri Kappa Upsilon chapter was formed from the April 29, 1959 merger of ΦΚ's Kappa chapter (1923-1935, revived 1948) and ΘΚΦ's Upsilon chapter (1949). The ΦΚ chapter had originally formed out of the Mercer Club (local), established prior to 1923. The ΘΚΦ chapter had been formed as a colony of that fraternity dating to 1948.)
**Iowa Xi**	February 15, 1924	Iowa State University	Ames	Iowa	Active	
Michigan Nu	February 15, 1924 – 1935	University of Michigan	Ann Arbor	Michigan	Inactive	
New Hampshire Epsilon	May 9, 1924 – 1976; 1984–2003	University of New Hampshire	Durham	New Hampshire	Inactive	
Ohio Omicron	January 31, 1925	University of Cincinnati	Cincinnati	Ohio	Inactive	
Pennsylvania Rho	February 11, 1925 – 2010	Carnegie Mellon University	Pittsburgh	Pennsylvania	Inactive	
**Nebraska Pi**	February 14, 1925 – 1934; 2007	University of Nebraska–Lincoln	Lincoln	Nebraska	Active	
Ohio Zeta	April 9, 1925 – 2005	Ohio Northern University	Ada	Ohio	Inactive	
**New York Sigma**	May 23, 1925	Rensselaer Polytechnic Institute	Troy	New York	Active	
New York Tau	June 13, 1925 – 1935; 2002 - 2024	Syracuse University	Syracuse	New York	Inactive	
New York Eta	June 25, 1925 – 1974	City College of New York	New York City	New York	Inactive	
Maine Upsilon	1926–1935	University of Maine	Orono	Maine	Inactive	
Colorado Phi	February 5, 1927 – 1933; 1949–1957	University of Denver	Denver	Colorado	Inactive	
New York Theta	June 1, 1927 – 1931	Cornell University	Ithaca	New York	Inactive	
Ohio Psi	January 19, 1929 – 1973; 1994–2017	Ohio University	Athens	Ohio	Inactive	
Pennsylvania Chi	February 9, 1929 – 1933	Bucknell University	Lewisburg	Pennsylvania	Inactive	
District of Columbia Omega	February 1, 1930 – 19xx ?	The Catholic University of America	Washington, D.C.	District of Columbia	Inactive	
Pennsylvania Iota	May 22, 1932 – 1971; 1990 – 200x ?; 2011–2018	Temple University	Philadelphia	Pennsylvania	Inactive	
Oklahoma Kappa	January 4, 1934 – 1964	University of Oklahoma	Norman	Oklahoma	Inactive	
**Massachusetts Lambda**	November 10, 1935	Worcester Polytechnic Institute	Worcester	Massachusetts	Active	
**Missouri Mu**	November 29, 1936	Missouri University of Science and Technology	Rolla	Missouri	Active	
Oklahoma Nu	May 2, 1937 – 199x ?	Oklahoma State University	Stillwater	Oklahoma	Inactive	
**Louisiana Xi**	April 14, 1938–1994; October 4, 2025	Louisiana State University	Baton Rouge	Louisiana	Active	(Note: The fraternity's website announced plans for re-establishment in the Fall of 2024, accessed 26 Oct 2023.)
Indiana Alpha Alpha	October 14, 1939 – 1972; 199x ? – 20xx ?	Indiana University	Bloomington	Indiana	Inactive	
**Louisiana Omicron**	May 4, 1941 – 200x ?; 2011	University of Louisiana at Lafayette	Lafayette	Louisiana	Active	
**Ohio Alpha Beta**	May 31, 1941	Case Western Reserve University	Cleveland	Ohio	Active	
Washington Alpha Delta	December 1, 1946 – 1980; 1995 - 2026	Washington State University	Pullman	Washington	Inactive	
Minnesota Alpha Epsilon	November 23, 1947 – 1961	University of Minnesota	Minneapolis	Minnesota	Inactive	
Missouri Kappa Kappa	April 10, 1948 – 1971; 19xx ?–2015	Saint Louis University	St. Louis	Missouri	Inactive	
Mississippi Rho	October 23, 1948 – 1960	Mississippi State University	Starkville	Mississippi	Inactive	
Massachusetts Sigma	March 13, 1949 – 1953	Boston University	Boston	Massachusetts	Inactive	
**Pennsylvania Tau**	April 10, 1949 – 20xx ?; 2009	Saint Francis University	Loretto	Pennsylvania	Active	
Ohio Phi	December 4, 1949 – 1971	Kent State University	Kent	Ohio	Inactive	
Wyoming Alpha Zeta	October 21, 1950 – 1963	University of Wyoming	Laramie	Wyoming	Inactive	
New York Alpha Eta	November 25, 1950 – 1968; 1971–1975	Manhattan College	The Bronx	New York	Inactive	(Note: This school moved from the borough of Manhattan to The Bronx in 1922.)
Oregon Alpha Theta	1951–1980	Oregon State University	Corvallis	Oregon	Inactive	
Mississippi Chi	April 15, 1951–1988	University of Mississippi	Oxford	Mississippi	Inactive	
Arizona Alpha Iota	May 6, 1951–1970	University of Arizona	Tucson	Arizona	Inactive	
Indiana Alpha Kappa	May 17, 1953 – 1976	Butler University	Indianapolis	Indiana	Inactive	
**Illinois Psi**	December 11, 1954 – 1979; 198x ?	Northern Illinois University	DeKalb	Illinois	Active	
Alabama Alpha Lambda	April 17, 1955 – 1970	Spring Hill College	Mobile	Alabama	Inactive	
Texas Alpha Mu	February 18, 1956 – 1985; 1994 – 200x ?	University of Houston	Houston	Texas	Inactive	
California Alpha Nu	April 8, 1956 – 1971; 19xx ? – xxxx ?	Loyola Marymount University	Los Angeles	California	Inactive	
**Michigan Omega**	May 18, 1957	University of Detroit Mercy	Detroit	Michigan	Active	
Pennsylvania Alpha Xi	November 24, 1957 – 1964; 2003-2021	Duquesne University	Pittsburgh	Pennsylvania	Inactive	
Arizona Alpha Omicron	1958–1975	Northern Arizona University	Flagstaff	Arizona	Inactive	
Texas Alpha Pi	April 5, 1959 – 1970; 1976–1980; 1982–1995; 2002	University of Texas at Austin	Austin	Texas	Inactive	
North Carolina Alpha Rho	December 12, 1959 – 2012	Belmont Abbey College	Belmont	North Carolina	Inactive	
Louisiana Alpha Phi	March 25, 1962 – 2009	University of New Orleans	New Orleans	Louisiana	Inactive	
Massachusetts Omega	May 12, 1962 – 1972; 1998–2003	Merrimack College	North Andover	Massachusetts	Inactive	
**California Phi Delta**	January 16, 1963 – 1977; 19xx ?–2003; 2009	University of San Diego	San Diego	California	Active	
**Georgia Delta Rho**	May 6, 1963	University of Georgia	Athens	Georgia	Active	
Indiana Chi Rho	May 18, 1963 – 200x ?	Indiana Institute of Technology	Fort Wayne	Indiana	Inactive	
Illinois Sigma Alpha	May 8, 1965 – 1970	Loyola University Chicago	Chicago	Illinois	Inactive	
New York Omega	May 15, 1965 – 19xx ?	Saint John's University	Queens	New York	Inactive	
**Indiana Alpha Gamma**	October 1, 1966	Trine University	Angola	Indiana	Active	(Note: This group was originally organized as the Catholic Club in 1929. In 1940, still a local group, it adopted the Greek letters of Alpha Gamma Omega. In 1965 negotiations began to merge with ΦΚΘ, which occurred in 1966.)
Louisiana Nu Omega	April 22, 1967 – 2019	Nicholls State University	Thibodaux	Louisiana	Inactive	
Illinois Kappa Phi	October 29, 1967 – 1978; 2001–2006	Lewis University	Romeoville	Illinois	Inactive	
Texas Kappa Theta	November 11, 1967 – 19xx ?	University of North Texas	Denton	Texas	Inactive	
Connecticut Epsilon Kappa	November 19, 1967 – 1974	Fairfield University	Fairfield	Connecticut	Inactive	
Texas Alpha Omega	March 9, 1968 – 200x ?	Lamar University	Beaumont	Texas	Inactive	
Quebec Alpha	March 23, 1968 – 1976	Concordia University	Montreal	Quebec, Canada	Inactive	(Note: The original school for this chapter was Loyola College of Montreal, which was absorbed by Concordia University in 1974.)
Illinois Theta Delta	April 20, 1968 – 200x ?	DePaul University	Chicago	Illinois	Inactive	
Michigan Alpha Alpha	April 27, 1968 – 1980	Ferris State University	Big Rapids	Michigan	Inactive	
Missouri Mu Sigma	May 4, 1968 – 2015	Truman State University	Kirksville	Missouri	Inactive	
Pennsylvania Kappa Epsilon	November 8, 1968 – 200x ?	La Salle University	Philadelphia	Pennsylvania	Inactive	
Michigan Chi Rho	November 23, 1968 – 2011	Michigan Technological University	Houghton	Michigan	Inactive	
Nova Scotia Sigma Mu	February 15, 1969 – 1973	St. Mary's University	Halifax	Nova Scotia, Canada	Inactive	
Tennessee Chi Nu	1969–1979	University of Memphis	Memphis	Tennessee	Inactive	(Note: This school's name was changed from Memphis State University to the University of Memphis on July 1, 1994.)
Louisiana Alpha Sigma	April 19, 1969 – 20xx ?	Loyola University New Orleans	New Orleans	Louisiana	Inactive	
Wisconsin Mu	April 26, 1969 – 19xx ?	Marquette University	Milwaukee	Wisconsin	Inactive	
**Georgia Gamma Tau**	May 3, 1969	Georgia Institute of Technology	Atlanta	Georgia	Active	
Indiana Gamma Omega	May 17, 1969 – 19xx ?	Purdue University Northwest	Hammond	Indiana	Inactive	(Note: This campus where this chapter was situated was formerly named Purdue Calumet. Upon merging with Purdue Westville in 2016 the school was renamed as Purdue University Northwest.)
Louisiana Delta Tau	May 17, 1969 – 1974	Southeastern Louisiana University	Hammond	Louisiana	Inactive	
Pennsylvania Psi	December 20, 1969 – 200x ?	PennWest California	California	Pennsylvania	Inactive	
Texas Epsilon Tau	May 9, 1970 – 1976	East Texas A&M University	Commerce	Texas	Inactive	(Note: Texas A&M University at Commerce changed its name to East Texas A&M University on 7 November 2024.)
**Texas Tau Mu**	May 16, 1970	University of Texas Rio Grande Valley	Edinburg	Texas	Active	
Georgia Alpha Chi	January 29, 1972 – 19xx ?	Georgia Southern University–Armstrong Campus	Savannah	Georgia	Inactive	
Louisiana Lambda Tau	November 18, 1972 – 1980	McNeese State University	Lake Charles	Louisiana	Inactive	
Florida Omega Alpha	January 27, 1973 – 1978	University of Florida	Gainesville	Florida	Inactive	
New Mexico Phi Alpha	April 28, 1973 – 1977	Santa Fe University of Art and Design	Santa Fe	New Mexico	Inactive	(Note: Formerly known as the College of Santa Fe, Santa Fe University of Art and Design closed in May 2018 due to "significant ongoing financial difficulties".)
Texas Kappa Tau	May 5, 1973 – 1984	Texas A&M University–Kingsville	Kingsville	Texas	Inactive	
New Jersey Phi Beta	May 28, 1973 - 2026	Seton Hall University	South Orange	New Jersey	Inactive	
Pennsylvania Theta Kappa	1974–200x ?	Indiana University of Pennsylvania	Indiana	Pennsylvania	Inactive	
Illinois Kappa Mu	September 6, 1980 – 2006	Western Illinois University	Macomb	Illinois	Inactive	
New York Beta Sigma	November 15, 1986 – 20xx ?	SUNY Buffalo	Buffalo	New York	Inactive	
Texas Beta Sigma	February 28, 1987 – 20xx ?	Texas State University	San Marcos	Texas	Inactive	
New Hampshire Alpha Epsilon	November 7, 1987 – 19xx ?	Keene State College	Keene	New Hampshire	Inactive	
Pennsylvania Delta	December 10, 1988 – 20xx ?	Mansfield University	Mansfield	Pennsylvania	Inactive	
California Phi Epsilon	April 29, 1989 –199x ?	California State University, Fullerton	Fullerton	California	Inactive	
**Texas Gamma Sigma**	May 6, 1989 – 20xx , 2025	Texas A&M University	College Station	Texas	Colony	
Pennsylvania Sigma Rho	March 3, 1990 – 2004	Slippery Rock University	Slippery Rock	Pennsylvania	Inactive	
Indiana Iota Rho	April 7, 1990 – 200x ?	Indiana-Purdue University Fort Wayne	Fort Wayne	Indiana	Inactive	
California Phi Theta	April 20, 1990 – 20xx ?; 2019	California State University, Dominguez Hills	Carson	California	Inactive	
California Phi Zeta	April 21, 1990 – 19xx ?	University of California at San Diego	San Diego	California	Inactive	
Virginia Gamma Mu	April 20, 1992 – 2017	George Mason University	Fairfax County	Virginia	Inactive	
Pennsylvania Epsilon Pi	April 24, 1993 – 20xx ?	PennWest Edinboro	Edinboro	Pennsylvania	Inactive	
California Phi Iota	November 11, 1995 – 2017	San Diego State University	San Diego	California	Inactive	
Texas Delta Sigma	August 4, 2001 – 2004	Sam Houston State University	Huntsville	Texas	Inactive	
Wisconsin Theta Phi	August 4, 2001 – 200x ?	Marian University	Fond du Lac	Wisconsin	Inactive	
Washington Beta Delta	August 9, 2003 – 2019	University of Washington	Seattle	Washington	Inactive	
**Massachusetts Kappa Theta**	September 15, 2003	University of Massachusetts Dartmouth	Dartmouth	Massachusetts	Active	
**Illinois Alpha Omega**	August 6, 2005	Eastern Illinois University	Charleston	Illinois	Active	
South Dakota Alpha Xi	November 4, 2008	University of South Dakota	Vermillion	South Dakota	Inactive	
Massachusetts Zeta	August 6, 2011 - 2025	Bridgewater State University	Bridgewater	Massachusetts	Inactive	
Georgia Lambda Chi	February 9, 2013 – 2019	Georgia Southern University	Statesboro	Georgia	Inactive	
**Colorado Chi Sigma**	February 12, 2013	Colorado State University	Fort Collins	Colorado	Active	
Alaska Alpha Kappa	April 29, 2016 – 2018	University of Alaska Anchorage	Anchorage	Alaska	Inactive	
**New York Alpha Omega**	May 1, 2016	Hofstra University	Hempstead	New York	Active	
**Arizona Alpha Zeta**	May 7, 2016	Arizona State University	Phoenix	Arizona	Active	
**Texas Delta Rho**	2024	University of Texas San Antonio	San Antonio	Texas	Colony	
**Tennessee Chi Beta**	2024	Christian Brothers University	Memphis	Tennessee	Colony	
