= List of Alpha Omega Epsilon chapters =

Alpha Omega Epsilon is a social and professional sorority for women in engineering and technical sciences. The sorority was founded at Marquette University in 1983. Following is a list of chapters and prospective chapters (colonies), with active chapters indicated in bold and inactive chapters in italics.

Chapter	Charter date and range	Institution	Location	Status	Ref.
**Alpha**	November 13, 1983	Marquette University	Milwaukee, Wisconsin	Active	(Note: Chapter formed from the local chapter of Triangle Little Sisters.)
Beta	January 1, 1985 – 202x ?	South Dakota School of Mines and Technology	Rapid City, South Dakota	Inactive	
**Gamma**	April 20, 1991	North Carolina State University	Raleigh, North Carolina	Active	(Note: Chapter formed from Theta Tau Little Sisters.)
**Delta**	August 1, 1992	Milwaukee School of Engineering	Milwaukee, Wisconsin	Active	(Note: Chapter formed from Omega Xi, established in 1989.)
**Epsilon**	October 11, 1996	University of Southern California	Los Angeles, California	Active	(Note: The Epsilon name was briefly used (Spring 1991 - Winter 1992) as the designation for a prospective chapter at the University of Minnesota. However, that group withdrew prior to installation to form its own sorority, Alpha Sigma Kappa. Thus the USC chapter is the first and only installed chapter of Alpha Omega Epsilon to use this name.)
**Zeta**	April 26, 1997	Syracuse University	Syracuse, New York	Active	(Note: Chapter formed from Sigma Lambda Epsilon, established in 1995.)
Eta	February 21, 1998	University of British Columbia	Vancouver, British Columbia, Canada	Inactive	
**Theta**	February 27, 1999	University of Illinois Urbana-Champaign	Champaign, Illinois	Active	(Note: Chapter formed from Lambda Epsilon, established in 1998.)
Iota	April 1, 2000	University of Michigan–Dearborn	Dearborn, Michigan	Inactive	
Kappa	April 28, 2001 – February 2006	North Dakota State University	Fargo, North Dakota	Inactive	(Note: Chapter formed from Kappa Epsilon Gamma.)
Lambda	June 2, 2001 – 20xx ?	Ohio State University	Columbus, Ohio	Inactive	
Mu	March 28, 2004	Northern Illinois University	Dekalb, Illinois	Inactive	
**Nu**	April 3, 2004	University of Delaware	Newark, Delaware	Active	
**Xi**	August 21, 2004	Clemson University	Clemson, South Carolina	Active	
**Omicron**	December 12, 2004	University of Wisconsin–Madison	Madison, Wisconsin	Active	
**Pi**	April 23, 2005	University of Virginia	Charlottesville, Virginia	Active	
**Rho**	January 22, 2006	Virginia Polytechnic Institute & State University	Blacksburg, Virginia	Active	
**Sigma**	February 4, 2006	Georgia Institute of Technology	Atlanta, Georgia	Active	
Tau	April 23, 2006	Rensselaer Polytechnic Institute	Troy, New York	Inactive	
**Upsilon**	April 30, 2006	University of Maryland, College Park	College Park, Maryland	Active	
**Phi**	November 17, 2007	Lamar University	Beaumont, Texas	Active	
**Chi**	March 29, 2008	George Washington University	Washington, D.C.	Active	
**Psi**	March 21, 2009	Binghamton University	Binghamton, New York	Active	
Omega	January 23, 2010	South Dakota State University	Brookings, South Dakota	Inactive	
**Beta Alpha**	April 24, 2010	Texas Tech University	Lubbock, Texas	Active	
Beta Beta	March 26, 2011	University of British Columbia at Okanagan	Kelowna, British Columbia, Canada	Inactive	
**Beta Gamma**	December 3, 2011	San Diego State University	San Diego, California	Active	
**Beta Delta**	January 21, 2012	Florida Atlantic University	Boca Raton, Florida	Active	
**Beta Epsilon**	January 28, 2012	University of Pennsylvania	Philadelphia, Pennsylvania	Active	
**Beta Zeta**	April 21, 2012	University of Missouri	Columbia, Missouri	Active	
**Beta Eta**	August 25, 2012	West Virginia University	Morgantown, West Virginia	Active	
Beta Theta	November 10, 2012 – 2021	Stony Brook University	Stony Brook, New York	Inactive	
**Beta Iota**	December 1, 2012	California Polytechnic State University, San Luis Obispo	San Luis Obispo, California	Active	
**Beta Kappa**	January 26, 2013	University of North Carolina at Charlotte	Charlotte, North Carolina	Active	
Beta Lambda	February 22, 2014	Lehigh University	Bethlehem, Pennsylvania	Inactive	
**Beta Mu**	March 1, 2014	Drexel University	Philadelphia, Pennsylvania	Active	
**Beta Nu**	March 30, 2014	Auburn University	Auburn, Alabama	Active	
**Beta Xi**	April 19, 2014	Washington University in St. Louis	St. Louis, Missouri	Active	
**Beta Omicron**	May 3, 2014	Rutgers University–New Brunswick	New Brunswick, New Jersey	Active	
**Beta Pi**	April 11, 2015	Oklahoma State University	Stillwater, Oklahoma	Active	
**Beta Rho**	January 23, 2016	University of Alabama	Tuscaloosa, Alabama	Active	
**Beta Sigma**	February 27, 2016	New York University	New York City, New York	Active	
**Beta Tau**	March 12, 2016	Kansas State University	Manhattan, Kansas	Active	
**Beta Upsilon**	May 6, 2017	San Jose State University	San Jose, California	Active	
**Beta Phi**	September 23, 2017	Widener University	Chester, Pennsylvania	Active	
**Beta Chi**	November 4, 2018	Cornell University	Ithaca, New York	Active	
**Beta Psi**	May 27, 2019	University of South Carolina	Columbia, South Carolina	Active	
**Beta Omega**	February 1, 2020	Texas A&M University	College Station, Texas	Active	
**Gamma Alpha**	August 1, 2020	James Madison University	Harrisonburg, Virginia	Active	
**Gamma Beta**	March 20, 2021	University of Tennessee	Knoxville, Tennessee	Active	
**Gamma Gamma**	May 6, 2023	Western Carolina University	Cullowhee, North Carolina	Active	
**Gamma Delta**	September 7, 2024	University of North Carolina at Chapel Hill	Chapel Hill, North Carolina	Active	
**Gamma Epsilon**	May 10, 2025	University of Nebraska–Lincoln	Lincoln, Nebraska	Active	(Note: Colony established in 2024.)
**Gamma Zeta**	September 27, 2025	University of Illinois Chicago	Chicago, Illinois	Active	(Note: Colony established in 2025.)
