= Alpha Omega Epsilon =

American women's engineering sorority

- ΑΩΕ
- Founded: November 13, 1983; 42 years ago Marquette University
- Type: Social and Professional
- Affiliation: PFA
- Status: Active
- Emphasis: Science, Technology, Engineering, and Mathematics (STEM)
- Scope: International
- Pillars: Friendship, Leadership, and Professionalism
- Colors: Royal Blue, White, and Silver
- Flower: White Carnation (Candidates); White Rose (Actives); Calla Lily (Alumnae)
- Jewel: Blue Sapphire, Pearl, Diamond
- Mascot: Dolphin
- Publication: The Angle
- Chapters: 45 active, 52 chartered
- Colonies: 2
- Members: 15,000+ lifetime
- Headquarters: 342 North Water Street Suite 600; Milwaukee, Wisconsin 53202; United States
- Website: www.alphaomegaepsilon.org

Alpha Omega Epsilon (ΑΩΕ) is a social and professional sorority for women in engineering and technical sciences. The sorority was founded in 1983 at Marquette University in Milwaukee, Wisconsin. It has chartered 52 chapters. Alpha Omega Epsilon is a member of the Professional Fraternity Association.

== History ==
=== 1980 to 1990 ===
In the early 1980s, the little sisters of both Sigma Phi Delta and Triangle Fraternity at Marquette University started meeting in hopes of forming an organization to increase the number of women in engineering. Alpha Omega Epsilon was founded as a professional engineering sorority on November 13, 1983. Its founders were 27 female engineering students, including Margaret Denzin, Marie Ferris, Brenda Kay Herold, Deborah Hoffman, Kimberly Hubbard, Maureen Kerrigan, Susanne Koth, Linda Kresmer, Lou Ann Lathrop, Catherine Lewis, Chris Ludwig, Lisa MacIsaac, Ann Mahnke, Kathy Rectenwald, Eileen Robarge, Felice M. Roberts, Patricia Rogers, Victoria Schlicht, Kristin Schneider, Lori Ann Sienicki, Mary Ruth Szews, Tu Quynh Tran, Sheri Weber, Teresa Williamson, Susan Wimmer, Carmen Valazco, and Lily Ying.

Its sorority's purpose was to advance the status of female engineers and create lifelong friendships. On March 22, 1984, the sorority was recognized by Marquette University. Alpha Omega Epsilon initiated its first class of new members in the fall of 1984. Beta chapter was established in 1985 at the South Dakota School of Mines from the local chapter of Triangle Little Sisters.

=== 1990 to 2000 ===
In 1990, Cindy Majcher (Alpha), Kathy Rectenwald (Alpha), Julie Whalen (Alpha), and Michelle Rohr (Beta) were selected as the members of a new national executive board, formed as the governing body for the future national organization. Its officers included an executive director, expansion officer, financial officer, and interchapter relations officer. Majcher served as the first executive director.

In 1991, the sorority initiated procedures to incorporate in Wisconsin, drafting a constitution and bylaws for a national organization. During this time, Alpha Omega Epsilon’s scope changed to include women in engineering and technical sciences. The Theta Tau Little Sisters at North Carolina State University became the Gamma chapter in 1991.

The national executive board's structure was changed in 1992, replacing the executive director with a president, the expansion officer with a vice president, the financial officer with a treasurer, and the interchapter relations officer with the secretary. The sorority's first national convention was held in Rapid City, South Dakota during the summer of 1992, with the Alpha, Beta, and Gamma chapters in attendance. In 1992, the NEB joined the Professional Fraternity Association (PFA).

The local sorority Omega Xi at the Milwaukee School of Engineering became the Delta chapter in 1992. The Alpha Sigma Kappa sorority at the University of Minnesota was accepted as the Epsilon prospective chapter, but withdrew the following year to form a new national organization. In 1993, the national constitution and bylaws were ratified, and a decision was made to incorporate as a social organization, making the sorority both a social and professional organization. In 1994, Alpha Omega Epsilon, Inc. received 501(c)(7) designation as a tax-exempt organization from the Internal Revenue Service.

Epsilon chapter was chartered at the University of Southern California in 1996, followed by Zeta at Syracuse University in 1997. In 1998, the Eta was installed at the University of British Columbia in Vancouver, British Columbia, marking the first international chapter of the sorority. In March 1998, the Alpha Omega Epsilon National Foundation received 501(c)(3) designation as a tax-exempt charitable organization from the IRS.

=== 2000 to present ===
In 2001, the sorority's constitution and bylaws were updated to recognize the change from national to international. With this change, the national executive board became the international executive board. The 2006 Convention was held jointly with Sigma Phi Delta engineering fraternity in Chicago. During that convention, regions and regional advisors were added, with each chapter assigned to a region. On March 8, 2008, the first alumnae chapter was chartered as the Alumnae chapter of the Delta chapter. On November 13, 2008, the sorority celebrated its 25th anniversary.

In 2010, Alpha Omega Epsilon's first double-lettered chapter, Beta Alpha, was installed at Texas Tech University. The sorority added 22 chapters between 2010 and 2019. In 2017, The boards structure changed from the International Executive Board to the Board of Directors. In 2018, the sorority celebrated its 35th anniversary in Indianapolis. The sorority chartered its 50th chapter at the University of Tennessee in 2021. As of 2025, the Alpha Omega Epsilon had initiated more than 15,000 members. The sorority's national headquarters is in Milwaukee, Wisconsin.

== Symbols ==
The Alpha Omega Epsilon's values or pillars are Friendship, Leadership, and Professionalism. The sorority's colors are royal blue, white, and silver. Its jewels are the blue sapphire, pearl, and diamond. Its flowers are the white carnation for candidates, the white rose for active members, and the calla lily for alumnae. Its mascot is the dolphin. Its publication is The Angle.

== Activities ==
Alpha Omega Epsilon chapters host speakers, organize social events, raise funds for charity, and sponsor events such as career day. Alumna mentor and participate in networking events with collegiate members.

== Philanthropy ==
The Alpha Omega Epsilon National Foundation is a nonprofit organization that focuses on academic development, organizational grants for professional and leadership development, and volunteer programs. On April 16, 2007, Rho chapter co-founder, Maxine Turner was killed during the Virginia Tech Massacre. The foundation established the Maxine Shelley Turner Memorial Scholarship in her memory. The Rho chapter created an annual philanthropic event called Take it to the Max which supports the scholarship and the Juvenile Diabetes Research Foundation.

== Chapters ==
Alpha Omega Epsilon has chartered 52 chapters, 46 of which are active.

== Notable members ==
- Maxine Shelly Turner, chemical engineering student and Rho chapter founding member, was killed in the Virginia Tech Massacre.

== See also ==
- History of women in engineering
- List of engineering societies
- List of social sororities and women's fraternities
- Professional fraternities and sororities
