= Phi kaps =

Phi Kaps may refer to the following fraternities or their members:

- Phi Kappa Sigma
- Phi Kappa Theta
