= List of Triangle chapters =

Triangle is an engineering fraternity that was established at the University of Illinois in 1907.

== Chapters ==
In the following list, active chapters are indicated in bold and inactive chapters are indicated in italics.

Chapter	Symbol	Charter date and range	Institution	Location	Status	Ref.
**Illinois**	ill	April 15, 1907	University of Illinois at Urbana–Champaign	Champaign, Illinois	Active	
**Purdue**	pur	April 8, 1909	Purdue University	West Lafayette, Indiana	Active	(Note: Chapter formed from the Transit Club, established in 1908.)
**Ohio State**	os	February 2, 1911	Ohio State University	Columbus, Ohio	Active	(Note: Chapter formed from the Transit Club, established in 1907.)
**Wisconsin**	wis	February 7, 1913	University of Wisconsin–Madison	Madison, Wisconsin	Active	(Note: Chapter formed from the Civil Engineers Club, established in 1912.)
**Kentucky**	ky	October 31, 1920 – 1983; 2005	University of Kentucky	Lexington, Kentucky	Active	(Note: Chapter formed from the Kentucky Engineers Club, established in 1920. After going dormant, it reformed as a colony in 2004.)
**Cincinnati**	cin	August 6, 1921 – 2005; 2014	University of Cincinnati	Cincinnati, Ohio	Active	(Note: Chapter formed from the Civil Engineer Men, established in 1920. After going dormant, it reformed as a colony in 2010.)
Iowa	ia	May 7, 1922 – 1948	University of Iowa	Iowa City, Iowa	Inactive	(Note: Chapter formed from the S.R.S. Club.)
**Minnesota**	minn	October 29, 1922	University of Minnesota	Minneapolis, Minnesota	Active	(Note: Chapter formed from Chi Sigma Tau, established in 1921.)
**Armour**	ar	May 26, 1923	Illinois Institute of Technology	Chicago, Illinois	Active	(Note: Chapter formed from Scroll & Triangle, established in 1921 at the Armour Institute of Technology. Armour later became the Illinois Institute of Technology.)
Missouri	mo	October 25, 1924 – 1933	University of Missouri	Columbia, Missouri	Inactive	(Note: Chapter formed from Alpha Epsilon Rho.)
**Michigan**	mich	February 21, 1925 – 1971; 1975–1995; 2007	University of Michigan	Ann Arbor, Michigan	Active	(Note: Chapter formed from Quad L, established in 1924.)
**Kansas**	kan	January 8, 1927	University of Kansas	Lawrence, Kansas	Active	(Note: Chapter formed from Gamma Epsilon.)
**Missouri Mines**	mom	December 10, 1927	Missouri University of Science and Technology	Rolla, Missouri	Active	(Note: Chapter formed from the Grubstakers Club, established in 1902, at the Missouri School of Mines. The School of Mines later became the Missouri University of Science and Technology.)
**Penn State**	ps	March 3, 1928	Pennsylvania State University	State College, Pennsylvania	Active	(Note: Chapter formed from Sigma Epsilon, established in 1925.)
**South Dakota Mines**	sdm	September 27, 1930	South Dakota School of Mines and Technology	Rapid City, South Dakota	Active	(Note: Chapter formed from Phi Kappa Phi, established in 1921.)
Northwestern	nu	May 25, 1935 – 1987	Northwestern University	Evanston, Illinois	Inactive	(Note: Chapter formed from Kappa Phi Gamma, established in 1926.)
**Marquette**	marq	April 24, 1937 – 2019; 2021	Marquette University	Milwaukee, Wisconsin	Active	(Note: Chapter formed from Gamma Theta Pi, established in 1922.)
**Louisville**	lou	March 22, 1941	University of Louisville	Louisville, Kentucky	Active	(Note: Chapter formed from the Pyramid Club, established in 1926.)
Cornell	cor	April 18, 1942 – 1985	Cornell University	Ithaca, New York	Inactive	(Note: Chapter formed from C.E.M., a local fraternity.)
**Michigan State**	msu	January 8, 1955	Michigan State University	East Lansing, Michigan	Active	(Note: Chapter formed from the Triangle Club, established in 1953.)
Clarkson	cl	November 16, 1957 – 1970	Clarkson University	Potsdam, New York	Inactive	
**UCLA**	ucla	December 7, 1957	University of California, Los Angeles	Los Angeles, California	Active	(Note: Chapter formed from the Triangle Club, established in 1956.)
**Nebraska**	neb	March 16, 1963 – 2011; 2016	University of Nebraska–Lincoln	Lincoln, Nebraska	Colony	
**Iowa State**	is	April 25, 1964 – 2011; 2018	Iowa State University	Ames, Iowa	Active	
Kansas State	ks	September 7, 1964 – 2019	Kansas State University	Manhattan, Kansas	Inactive	
**Oklahoma State**	oks	November 21, 1964 – 1995; 2026	Oklahoma State University	Stillwater, Oklahoma	Active	
M.S.O.E.	msoe	January 23, 1965	Milwaukee School of Engineering	Milwaukee, Wisconsin	Active	(Note: Chapter formed from Delta Alpha Epsilon, established in 1964.)
R.I.T.	rit	February 4, 1967 – 2010	Rochester Institute of Technology	Rochester, New York	Inactive	
**Colorado State**	csu	May 27, 1967 – 2006; 2012	Colorado State University	Fort Collins, Colorado	Active	
**Rose Tech**	rose	May 4, 1968	Rose–Hulman Institute of Technology	Terre Haute, Indiana	Active	
**Colorado**	colo	April 26, 1969 – 1972; 2023	University of Colorado at Boulder	Boulder, Colorado	Active	
**Pitt**	pitt	April 4, 1970 – 2001; 2007	University of Pittsburgh	Pittsburgh, Pennsylvania	Active	
**UWM**	uwm	April 11, 1970	University of Wisconsin–Milwaukee	Milwaukee, Wisconsin	Active	(Note: Chapter formed by absorbing Sigma Delta Omega, established in 1956.)
**Toledo**	tol	May 22, 1971	University of Toledo	Toledo, Ohio	Active	
Mississippi State	miss	November 11, 1972 – 1987	Mississippi State University	Starkville, Mississippi	Inactive	
Oklahoma	ok	November 18, 1979 – 2024	University of Oklahoma	Norman, Oklahoma	Inactive	
**Virginia Tech**	vpi	April 19, 1980 – 1996; 2015	Virginia Tech	Blacksburg, Virginia	Colony	
Connecticut	conn	March 27, 1982 – 1998	University of Connecticut	Storrs, Connecticut	Inactive	
U.T.A.	uta	September 27, 1986 – 2000	University of Texas at Arlington	Arlington, Texas	Inactive	
**T.A.M.U.**	tamu	April 9, 1988 – 1999; 2007–2009; 2024	Texas A&M University	College Station, Texas	Colony	
**Michigan Tech**	mtu	April 16, 1988 – 2006; 2012	Michigan Technological University	Houghton, Michigan	Active	
T.S.U.	tsu	April 15, 1989 – 2008	Trine University	Angola, Indiana	Inactive	(Note: Chapter formed from Nu Pi, established in 1981, at Tri-State University. Tri-State later became Trine University.)
Akron	akr	November 2, 1991 – 1997	University of Akron	Akron, Ohio	Inactive	
Northern Illinois	niu	October 9, 1993 – 2006	Northern Illinois University	DeKalb, Illinois	Inactive	
Maryland B.C.	umbc	June 4, 2005 – 2019	University of Maryland, Baltimore County	Catonsville, Maryland	Inactive	
Houston	hou	April 19, 2008 – 2019	University of Houston	Houston, Texas	Inactive	
UC Berkeley	cal	April 24, 2010 – 2016	University of California, Berkeley	Berkeley, California	Inactive	
**UCSan Diego**	ucsd	February 11, 2011	University of California, San Diego	San Diego California	Active	
UNC Charlotte	char	April 30, 2011	University of North Carolina at Charlotte	Charlotte, North Carolina	Active	
**Cal Poly Pomona**	cpp	May 7, 2011	California State Polytechnic University, Pomona	Pomona, California	Active	
**UCI**	uci	September 29, 2012	University of California, Irvine	Irvine, California	Active	
Florida Atlantic	fau	September 7, 2013 – 2019	Florida Atlantic University	Boca Raton, Florida	Inactive	
**Penn State Behrend**	psb	February 28, 2015	Penn State Erie, The Behrend College	Erie Pennsylvania	Active	
**Virginia Commonwealth**	vcu	April 11, 2015	Virginia Commonwealth University	Richmond Virginia	Active	
**Utah**	utah	April 25, 2015	University of Utah	Salt Lake City, Utah	Active	
**Clemson**	clem	April 8, 2017	Clemson University	Clemson, South Carolina	Active	
**Washington**	uw	May 21, 2022	University of Washington	Seattle, Washington	Active	
**Washington State**	wsu		Washington State University	Pullman, Washington	Colony	

== Statistics ==
=== New chapters by decade ===
Decade	Total	New Chapters
1907–1909	2	
1910–1919	2	
1920–1929	10	
1930–1939	3	
1940–1949	2	
1950–1959	3	
1960–1969	9	
1970–1979	5	
1980–1989	6	
1990–1999	2	
2000–2009	2	
2010–2019	10	
2020–present (as of 2023)	1	

=== Chapters by region ===
Region	Total	Chapters
Northeast	7	
Midwest	27	
South	14	
West	8	
