= List of Sigma Phi Delta chapters =

Sigma Phi Delta is a professional fraternity for engineering. In the following list, active chapters are indicated in bold and inactive chapters are in italics.

| Chapter | Charter date and range | Institution | Location | Status | Ref. |
|---|---|---|---|---|---|
| **Alpha** | April 11, 1924 | University of Southern California | Los Angeles, California | Active | (Note: Sigma Phi Delta was founded in the third attempt to establish an engineering fraternity at the university, the other two having been terminated into general fraternities. Unlike many fraternities at USC, the Alpha chapter owns its historic house. The chapter house originally served as a foreign government consulate.) |
| Beta | May 2, 1926 | University of South Dakota | Vermillion, South Dakota | Inactive | |
| Gamma | May 11, 1927 | University of Texas | Austin, Texas | Inactive | |
| **Delta** | January 25, 1928 | University of Illinois Urbana-Champaign | Champaign, Illinois | Active | |
| **Epsilon** | May 21, 1928 | North Dakota State University | Fargo, North Dakota | Colony | |
| Zeta | April 26, 1929 | Tulane University | New Orleans, Louisiana | Inactive | (Note: Chapter formed Omega Sigma Phi, a local engineering fraternity.) |
| **Eta** | May 23, 1931 | Marquette University | Milwaukee, Wisconsin | Active | (Note: Chapter formed from Omega Sigma Phi (local).) |
| **Theta** | April 24, 1932 | University of British Columbia | Vancouver, British Columbia, Canada | Active | |
| Iota | October 12, 1935 – c. 1977 | Chicago Technical College | Chicago, Illinois | Inactive | (Note: The college closed in 1977.) |
| **Kappa** | May 25, 1947 | Trine University | Angola, Indiana | Active | |
| Lambda | May 11, 1951 | Indiana Institute of Technology | Fort Wayne, Indiana | Inactive | |
| Mu | July 14, 1951 | University of California, Los Angeles | Los Angeles, California | Inactive | |
| Nu | December 6, 1952 | University of California, Berkeley | Berkeley, California | Inactive | |
| Xi | May 2, 1953 | University of Manitoba | Fort Garry (Winnipeg), Manitoba, Canada | Inactive | |
| Omicron | May 3, 1958 | Michigan State University | East Lansing, Michigan | Inactive | |
| Pi | October 10, 1960 | Embry–Riddle Aeronautical University | Daytona Beach, Florida | Inactive | |
| Rho | December 18, 1965 | Bradley University | Peoria, Illinois | Inactive | |
| Sigma | February 1, 1969 | California State University, Long Beach | Long Beach, California | Inactive | |
| Tau | April 11, 1970 | Loyola Marymount University | Los Angeles, California | Inactive | |
| Upsilon | April 8, 1989 | University of Wisconsin | Madison, Wisconsin | Inactive | |
| Phi | May 4, 1991 | South Dakota State University | Brookings, South Dakota | Inactive | |
| Chi | April 10, 1999 | University of Cincinnati | Cincinnati, Ohio | Inactive | |
| **Psi** | April 11, 1999 | University of Delaware | Newark, Delaware | Active | |
| Omega | May 13, 2000 | Rutgers University | New Brunswick, New Jersey | Inactive | |
| Beta-Alpha | January 5, 2003 | Bangladesh University of Engineering and Technology | Dhaka, Bangladesh | Inactive | |
| **Beta-Gamma** | May 17, 2003 | Lamar University | Beaumont, Texas | Active | |
| **Beta-Delta** | December 3, 2005 | Virginia Tech | Blacksburg, Virginia | Active | |
| **Beta-Epsilon** | March 28, 2009 | University of British Columbia Okanagan | Kelowna, British Columbia, Canada | Active | |
| Beta-Zeta | August 14, 2010 | Wright State University | Dayton, Ohio | Inactive | |
| Beta-Eta | February 4, 2012 | Stony Brook University | Stony Brook, New York | Inactive | |
| Beta-Theta | February 11, 2012 | James Madison University | Harrisonburg, Virginia | Inactive | |
| **Beta-Iota** | June 23, 2012 | University of Maryland, College Park | College Park, Maryland | Active | |
| **Beta-Kappa** | March 23, 2013 | Lehigh University | Bethlehem, Pennsylvania | Active | |
| **Beta-Lambda** | April 20, 2013 | San Diego State University | San Diego, California | Active | |
| **Beta-Mu** | October 19, 2013 | Milwaukee School of Engineering | Milwaukee, Wisconsin | Active | |
| **Beta-Nu** | April 19, 2014 | California Polytechnic State University | San Luis Obispo, California | Active | |
| **Beta-Xi** | December 6, 2014 | West Virginia University | Morgantown, West Virginia | Active | |
| **Beta-Omicron** | December 13, 2014 | University of Missouri | Columbia, Missouri | Active | |
| Beta-Pi | May 2, 2015 | Texas Tech University | Lubbock, Texas | Inactive | (Note: Merged with the Tau Gamma chapter of Delta Kappa Epsilon) |
| Beta-Rho | April 9, 2016 | University of Florida | Gainesville, Florida | Inactive | |
| **Beta-Sigma** | May 17, 2018 | Howard University | Washington, D.C. | Colony | |
| **Cornell** | | Cornell University | Ithaca, New York | Colony | |
