= Sigma Phi Delta =

Social-professional fraternity of engineers

- ΣΦΔ
- Founded: April 11, 1924; 102 years ago University of Southern California
- Type: Social
- Affiliation: PFA
- Former affiliation: NIC; PIC
- Status: Active
- Emphasis: Professional - Engineering
- Scope: International
- Motto: Pro Bono Professionis "For the Good of the Profession"
- Colors: Red and Black
- Symbol: Castle
- Flag
- Flower: American Beauty Rose
- Publication: The Castle
- Chapters: 16
- Colonies: 3
- Members: 13,000 lifetime
- Headquarters: 4000 W. Montrose Ave. #908; Chicago, Illinois 60641; United States
- Website: www.sigmaphidelta.org

Sigma Phi Delta (ΣΦΔ) is an international social-professional fraternity of engineers. As "The Premier International Fraternity of Engineers", the organization is the only fraternity of its kind that draws its membership exclusively from male engineering students at ABET-accredited colleges and universities, as other similar organizations are co-ed or admit students not strictly in traditional engineering programs (such as architecture or technical sciences).

== History ==
=== Founding and Early Growth (1923–1926) ===
Sigma Phi Delta was established at the University of Southern California (USC) following two previous, unsuccessful attempts to form an engineering fraternity on campus that had both converted into general social fraternities. In the fall of 1923, a group of engineering students revived the effort, holding their first formal meeting in the spring of 1924 at the university YMCA building, known as "The Red Barn". The organization considers April 11, 1924, its official founding date. The name "Sigma Phi Delta" was adopted on April 25, 1924, followed by the selection of red and black as official colors on May 9.

The fraternity initiated its first pledge class on June 3, 1924. Over the following year, the fraternity adopted its symbols, including the pledge pin, crest, and the motto "Pro Bono Professionis" ("For the Good of the Profession"). Gilbert H. Dunstan, a member of the first pledge class initiated in late 1924, was elected president of the local chapter in 1925, assigned General Number One in the fraternity registry, and served as the first Grand President upon nationalization. Dunstan was later designated the fraternity's second "Grand Old Man of Sigma Phi Delta" in recognition of his service.

=== Nationalization and International Expansion (1926–1939) ===
On April 11, 1926, the fraternity merged with Delta Pi Sigma, a local engineering fraternity at the University of South Dakota. This established the Alpha Chapter at USC and the Beta Chapter at South Dakota. Governance was placed under a five-member Supreme Council. The fraternity began publishing its quarterly magazine, the Castle, in 1926, and an internal publication, the Star, in 1928.

Between 1927 and 1931, the fraternity chartered chapters at the University of Texas (1927), University of Illinois (1928), North Dakota Agricultural College (1928), Tulane University (1929), and Marquette University (1931). Sigma Phi Delta became an international organization on April 24, 1932, with the installation of the Theta Chapter at the University of British Columbia.

=== Depression, World War II, and Post-War Governance (1930s–1950s) ===
During the Great Depression and World War II, many chapter houses were vacated or repurposed as military dormitories. General Manager Russell C. Smith maintained central administrative operations through the war years. Smith was elected fifth Grand President in 1949 and was designated the fraternity's first "Grand Old Man of Sigma Phi Delta" in 1953.

The fraternity incorporated as a non-profit entity in the State of California on September 29, 1952. That same year, Robert J. Beals was elected as the ninth Grand President, serving 22 consecutive years in the role before serving as Executive Secretary until 1998. Beals was named "Grand Old Man" in 1977.

=== Modern Era (1960s–Present) ===
During the 1980s, the fraternity established organizational health and safety policies, adopting a formal definition of hazing in 1984 and mandating a "dry rush" policy in 1985.

In 1991, members established the Sigma Phi Delta Foundation, an independent 501(c)(3) organization created to award educational scholarships and grants. The fraternity was a member of the North-American Interfraternity Conference (NIC) from 2006 to 2016. Growth continued into the 21st century alongside further chapter additions across North American universities.

== Symbols ==
=== Coat of Arms ===
The description of the crest, using heraldic language, is: Gules, a pall or, between, in chief two retorts crossed argent, in dexter base a quill sable surmounting a key in saltire, of the third, in sinister base a hammer fesswise of the fourth debruising a compass, points downward, of the third; over all the escutcheon of pretense, azure, charged with a castle or, masoned sable, with a bordure argent. The crest, over a duke's helmet and a torse of the colors, is a dexter cubit arm, proper, grasping a thunderbolt, winged or. Its mantling is Gules doubled. Its supporters are two lions rampant, proper. Below is the motto of Sigma Phi Delta, in upper and lower case Greek letters

=== Insignia ===
The name of the fraternity is represented by the capital form of the Greek letters Sigma (Σ), Phi (Φ), Delta (Δ) which stand for Science, Friendship and Duty.

=== Badge ===
The member's badge is described as: "A triangle having concave corners on which are superimposed three smaller triangles having concave sides and having their vertices at the center of the badge on which is placed a ruby. The smaller triangles, which contain the letters Sigma, Phi and Delta, are black, the background between them being white. A gold star is located near each of the vertices of the large triangle. The border may be engraved gold or may be jeweled. The crown pearl badge has four pearls on each side of the badge. The ruby point badge has two rubies and two pearls on each side, the pearls being in the middle and the rubies at the outside".

=== Pledge pin ===
The pledge pin is described as: "A red triangular background on which is a black Castle, the whole bordered in gold".

=== Fraternity flag ===
The fraternity flag is 4 feet by 6 feet, made of cotton bunting or nylon. The design is black letters, bordered with white and a gold Castle on a red field. This is a standard flag, that is, read correctly from left to right on one side and in reverse on the other.

== Partnerships ==
In 2015, Sigma Phi Delta partnered with Alpha Omega Epsilon and the FIRST Robotics Competition to support K–12 STEM education and expand mentorship opportunities. Through the alliance, collegiate chapters provide volunteer coaching, technical guidance, and resource support to local school robotics teams. The initiative formalizes local community outreach efforts previously maintained independently by individual chapters and aligns with the fraternity's goal of promoting engineering education.

== Notable members ==
=== Alumni ===
- Patrick E. Haggerty (Eta chapter) – Co-founder, former president, and chairman of Texas Instruments, which became a major semiconductor manufacturer under his leadership.
- Frank G. Soltis (Epsilon chapter) – Computer scientist and IBM chief architect whose work shaped the System/38 and AS/400 computer families and their successors.
- Bill Tai (Delta chapter) – Venture capitalist and early investor in Zoom and Canva.
- John Rakolta Jr. (Eta chapter) – Former U.S. ambassador to the United Arab Emirates and former chairman and CEO of Walbridge.
- Peter Bonerz (Eta chapter) – Actor known for playing Jerry Robinson on The Bob Newhart Show; television director whose credits include Friends and Murphy Brown.
- Eric Newell (Theta chapter) – Former chairman and CEO of Syncrude and former chancellor of the University of Alberta.
- William R. “Bill” Stemper (Eta chapter) – Former president of Comcast Business, which he helped build into a business generating more than $10 billion in annual revenue; Cable Hall of Fame inductee.
- Hugh C. Willett (Alpha chapter) – Former president of the National Collegiate Athletic Association, serving during its early regulation of televised college football.
- F. William “Bill” Gutzwiller (Eta chapter) – General Electric engineer who helped develop and commercialize the silicon-controlled rectifier and pioneered its practical applications in electronic power control.
- Judson S. Swearingen (Gamma chapter) – Inventor and entrepreneur who advanced cryogenic expander and compressor technology and shaft seals for high-speed machinery; founder of Rotoflow Corporation.
- Ivan Bekey (Mu chapter) – Former NASA director of advanced programs who promoted space-tether technology for satellite deployment, propulsion, and electrical power generation.
- Maurice Nelles (Beta chapter) – Engineer, business executive, and professor who designed the research vessel Velero IV and the benthoscope used in Otis Barton’s record-setting 4,500-foot dive.
- David J. Rose (Theta chapter) – MIT nuclear engineer and fusion-technology pioneer whose work also addressed energy policy, nuclear waste management, and the ethical responsibilities of scientists.
- John E. Breen (Eta chapter) – Structural engineer whose research influenced national and international standards for concrete bridges and buildings, including reinforced and prestressed concrete systems.
- Harold B. Gotaas (Beta chapter) – Sanitary engineer and National Academy of Engineering member recognized for work in waste management and pollution control; former dean of Northwestern University’s Technological Institute.
- Bernard O. Brynelsen (Theta chapter) – Mining engineer instrumental in developing British Columbia’s Brenda copper mine and other mineral projects; Canadian Mining Hall of Fame inductee and recipient of the Order of British Columbia.
- Alvin Narod (Theta chapter) – Construction executive who helped lead the original BC Place stadium and surrounding development project in Vancouver.
- Rhaoul A. Guillaume Sr. (Eta chapter) – Civil engineer and founder of GOTECH who helped oversee construction of the Louisiana Superdome.
- Dean A. Nyquist (Epsilon chapter) – Minnesota state senator and longtime mayor of Brooklyn Center.
- John E. Hoff (Gamma chapter) – University of Houston tennis coach and Texas Tennis Hall of Fame inductee; former chair of the university’s civil engineering department.

=== Faculty members ===
- H. Vincent Poor (Delta chapter, faculty member) – Princeton electrical engineer recognized for research in wireless communications and signal processing; member of the National Academies of Sciences and Engineering and recipient of the IEEE Alexander Graham Bell Medal.
- Thomas C. Katsouleas (Alpha chapter, faculty member) – Plasma physicist and former president of the University of Connecticut; helped establish the National Academy of Engineering’s Grand Challenge Scholars Program.
- Ali A. Seireg (Eta chapter, faculty member) – Mechanical and biomedical engineer who pioneered powered exoskeleton research to assist people with paralysis in walking and rehabilitation.
- Frank M. Gryna (Rho chapter, faculty member) – Industrial engineer and quality-management scholar; co-author with Joseph M. Juran of the first four editions of Juran’s Quality Handbook and former senior vice president of the Juran Institute.
- Henry C. Gunning (Theta chapter, faculty member) – Geologist and former dean of applied science at the University of British Columbia; recipient of the Geological Association of Canada’s Logan Medal.

== See also ==
- Professional fraternities and sororities
