= Maurice Nelles =

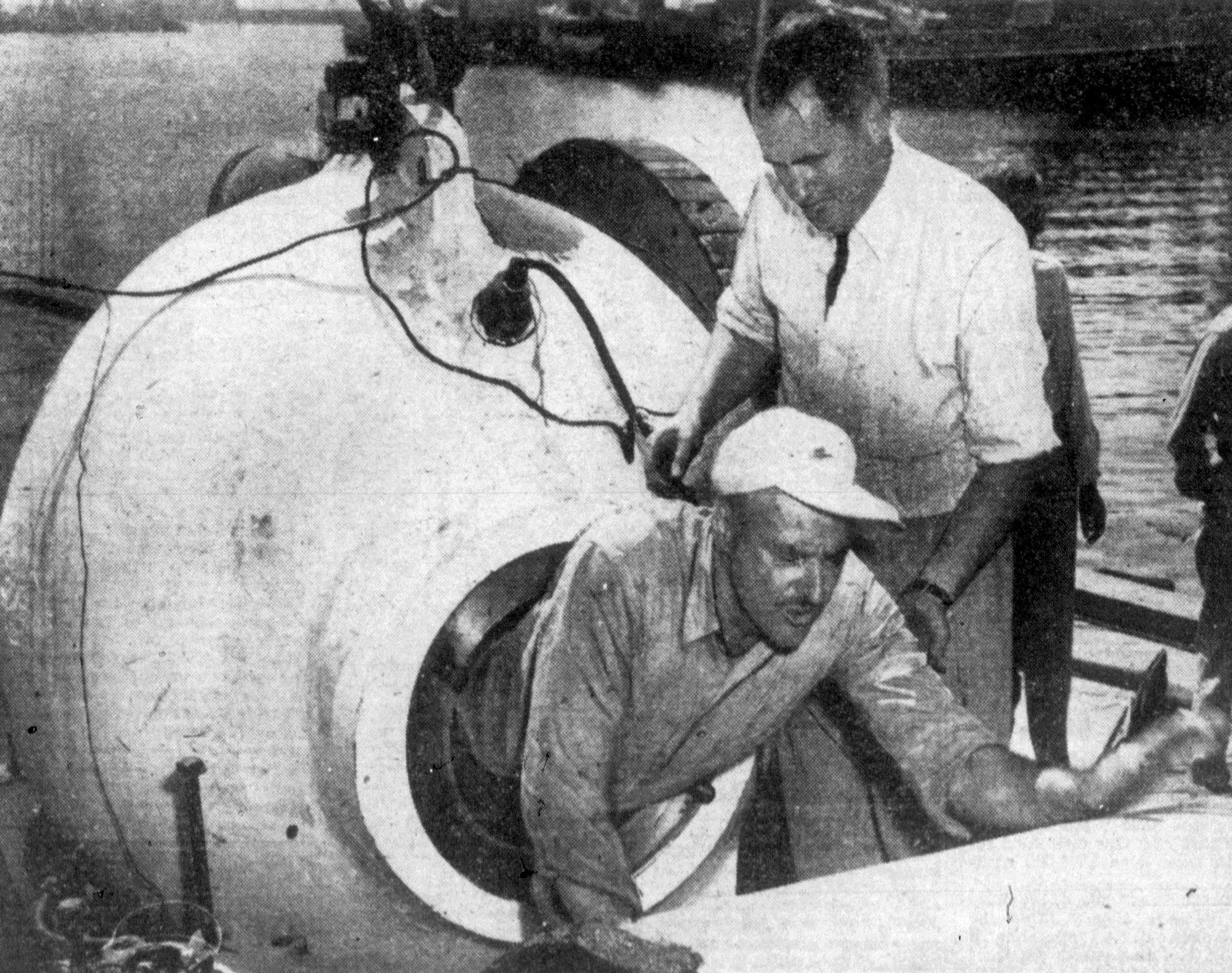
- Nelles (right, standing) with diver Otis Barton in 1949.
- Born: October 19, 1906; Madison, South Dakota
- Died: August 30, 1996 (aged 89)
- Education: University of South Dakota; Harvard University
- Scientific career
- Workplaces: Lockheed Corporation University of Southern California; Pennsylvania State University University of Virginia

Maurice Nelles (October 19, 1906 - August 30, 1998) was an engineer, business executive and professor.

== Early life and education ==
Nelles was born in Madison, South Dakota. Nelles earned a bachelor's degree in 1927 and a master's degree in 1928, both from the University of South Dakota and earned a Ph.D. from Harvard University in 1934. While at Harvard, he held the Charles A. Coffin Fellowship and the George H. Emerson and Harvard scholarships.

== Career ==
During World War II, Nelles worked at Lockheed Corporation and the War Production Board. While at Lockheed, Nelles and his coworkers Morlan A. Visel and Ernest L. Black proposed a "Pacific Research Foundation" which eventually became SRI International.

After Lockheed, Nelles became a professor of aeronautical engineering at the University of Southern California, where he designed the laboratory ship Velero IV. In 1949 he oversaw Otis Barton's record-breaking 4500 ft deep sea dive off of Santa Cruz Island in a benthoscope that Nelles had designed. He would also teach at Pennsylvania State University and the University of Virginia.

He served as the director of research for Borg Warner, Technicolor, Crane, and Westinghouse. He was later a consultant to the National Academy of Sciences.

Nelles died August 30, 1998, in La Jolla, California.
