= Phi Kappa (Catholic fraternity) =

Defunct American collegiate fraternity

- ΦΚ
- Founded: October 1, 1889; 137 years ago Brown University
- Type: Social
- Former affiliation: NIC
- Status: Merged
- Merge date: April 29, 1959
- Successor: Phi Kappa Theta
- Emphasis: Catholicism
- Scope: National
- Motto: "Loyalty to God and College"
- Member badge
- Colors: Purple, White, and Gold
- Flower: Ophelia Rose
- Jewel: Amethyst
- Publication: Yippa-Yappa later, The Temple
- Chapters: 40 installed
- Headquarters: United States

Phi Kappa (ΦΚ) was an American social fraternity founded on October 1, 1889 by a group of Catholic students at Brown University who were refused entrance to other fraternities because of their faith. On April 29, 1959, Phi Kappa merged with a similar fraternity Theta Kappa Phi to form Phi Kappa Theta.

== History ==
Phi Kappa originated as a local club for Catholic students at Brown University called Phi Kappa Sigma, meaning "Fraternity of Catholic Students". Its founders were James E. Brennan, Thomas P Corcoran, Edward F. Cunningham, John J. Fitzgerald, James M. Gillrain, Dennis J. Holland, Joseph Mary Killelea, Edward S. Kiley, Joseph Kirwen, William H. Magill, Arthur F. McGinn, Edward DeV. O'Connor, and James E. Smith. (Note: Phi Kappa Theta's History notes nine founders, but Baird's goes on to mention four more. Baird's list is shown here. Three of these men are the first initiates, Magill, Fitzgerald, and Corcoran, with the addition of Kirwen.)

From the beginning the organization emphasized loyalty to alma mater and remained a home for Catholic students who were otherwise unable to join other fraternities. Its name was changed to Phi Kappa in 1900 after the discovery of an older society with the same name. It was incorporated on April 29, 1902 in the State of Rhode Island. This date was celebrated by the fraternity as its Founders Day.

Expansion was sought out at large schools, and not specifically Catholic institutions. Its Beta chapter was placed at the University of Illinois in 1912 with the adoption of the local Loyola Club. This was soon followed by the Gamma chapter at Penn State in 1913. Many of its chapters came from the absorption of earlier local groups or Catholic clubs. Phi Kappa joined the North American Interfraternity Conference in 1916.

Phi Kappa went on to form 40 chapters before its merger with Theta Kappa Phi on April 29, 1959, at which time the two Catholic-affinity fraternities formed Phi Kappa Theta. At the time of the merger it was found that, despite the size of both organizations, there were only five schools where both fraternities existed: Illinois, Penn State, Ohio State, Missouri and Wisconsin. Phi Kappa has 32 active chapters at the time of the merger.

== Symbols ==
The badge of Phi Kappa badge was square, situated in a diamond fashion (called a quatrefoil), with amethysts at each corner. The sides were finished with pearls. The Greek letter Κ, etched, was in the center, superimposed by the Greek letter Φ, in plain (Roman) finish.

Its colors were purple, white, and gold. The fraternity flower was the "Ophelia Rose". Its jewel was the amethyst. The fraternity's flag consisted of vertical stripes of purple, white, and gold, with the letter Φ on the purple stripe, the letter Κ was on the gold stripe, and a replica of the pledge pin on the white stripe. Its motto was "Loyalty to God and College."

The fraternity's original magazine was first published in 1916. It was called the Yippa-Yappa, after the nickname of the brotherhood during its early days at Brown. Later, it had a quarterly publication called The Temple. Its other publications included a songbook Manual for Chapter Fellows, a Pledge Manual, and a membership directory.

== Chapters ==
Following is a list of Phi Kappa chapters.

| Chapter | Charter date and range | Institution | Location | Status | Ref. |
|---|---|---|---|---|---|
| Alpha | October 1, 1889 – 1930 | Brown University | Providence, Rhode Island | Inactive | (Note: This chapter was dormant at the time of the merger. It was granted the post-merger name as Rhode Island Alpha chapter of Theta Kappa Phi.) |
| Beta | May 27, 1912 – April 29, 1959 | University of Illinois | Urbana, Illinois | Merged (ΦΚΘ) | (Note: This chapter originated as the Loyola Club (local) in 1909. It became the Illinois Beta Delta chapter of Phi Kappa Theta at the time of the national merger with Theta Kappa Phi.) |
| Gamma | November 7, 1913 – April 29, 1959 | Pennsylvania State University | University Park, Pennsylvania | Merged (ΦΚΘ) | (Note: This chapter originated as Sigma Phi Delta (local) in 1913. It became the Pennsylvania Beta Gamma chapter of Phi Kappa Theta at the time of the national merger with Theta Kappa Phi.) |
| Delta | March 14, 1914 – 1932; 1947 – April 29, 1959 | University of Iowa | Iowa City, Iowa | Merged (ΦΚΘ) | (Note: This chapter originated as the Loyola Club (local). It became the Alpha chapter of Phi Kappa Theta at the time of the national merger with Theta Kappa Phi.) |
| Epsilon | October 2, 1915 – April 29, 1959 | University of Kansas | Lawrence, Kansas | Merged (ΦΚΘ) | (Note: This chapter originated as the Columbus Club Knights (local) in 1908. It became the Kansas Epsilon chapter of Phi Kappa Theta at the time of the national merger with Theta Kappa Phi.) |
| Zeta | February 11, 1918 – April 29, 1959 | Purdue University | West Lafayette, Indiana | Merged (ΦΚΘ) | (Note: This chapter originated as the Newman House Club (local) in 1913. It became the Indiana Zeta chapter of Phi Kappa Theta at the time of the national merger with Theta Kappa Phi.) |
| Eta | January 1, 1919 – April 29, 1959 | Massachusetts Institute of Technology | Cambridge, Massachusetts | Merged (ΦΚΘ) | (Note: This chapter originated as Alpha Epsilon (local) in 1918. It became the Massachusetts Eta chapter of Phi Kappa Theta at the time of the national merger with Theta Kappa Phi.) |
| Theta | March 28, 1920 – April 29, 1959 | Ohio State University | Columbus, Ohio | Merged (ΦΚΘ) | (Note: This chapter originated as the Newman Club (local) in 1909. It became the Ohio Gamma Theta chapter of Phi Kappa Theta at the time of the national merger with Theta Kappa Phi.) |
| Iota | April 9, 1921 – April 29, 1959 | Kansas State University | Manhattan, Kansas | Merged (ΦΚΘ) | (Note: This chapter originated as Phi Gamma (local) in 1919. It became the Kansas Iota chapter of Phi Kappa Theta at the time of the national merger with Theta Kappa Phi.) |
| Kappa | July 7, 1922 – 1935; 1948 – April 29, 1959 | University of Missouri | Columbia, Missouri | Merged (ΦΚΘ) | (Note: This chapter originated as the Mercier Club (local) before 1922. It became the Missouri Kappa Upsilon chapter of Phi Kappa Theta at the time of the national merger with Theta Kappa Phi.) |
| Lambda | January 7, 1922 – April 29, 1959 | University of Wisconsin–Madison | Madison, Wisconsin | Merged (ΦΚΘ) | (Note: This chapter originated as the Mercier Club (local) before 1922. It became the Wisconsin Lambda chapter of Phi Kappa Theta at the time of the national merger, absorbing an existing Theta Kappa Phi colony.) |
| Mu | May 20, 1922 – April 29, 1959 | University of Pittsburgh | Pittsburgh, Pennsylvania | Merged (ΦΚΘ) | (Note: This chapter originated as Psi Delta Chi (local) in 1921. It became the Pennsylvania Mu chapter of Phi Kappa Theta at the time of the national merger with Theta Kappa Phi.) |
| Nu | February 15, 1924 – 1935 | University of Michigan | Ann Arbor, Michigan | Inactive | (Note: This chapter originated as the Richard Club (local) in 1922. Although the chapter was inactive at the time of the national merger, it later became the Michigan Nu chapter of Phi Kappa Theta.) |
| Xi | February 15, 1924 – April 29, 1959 | Iowa State University | Ames, Iowa | Merged (ΦΚΘ) | (Note: This chapter originated as the American Club (local) in 1920. It became the Iowa Xi chapter of Phi Kappa Theta at the time of the national merger with Theta Kappa Phi.) |
| Omicron | January 31, 1925 – April 29, 1959 | University of Cincinnati | Cincinnati, Ohio | Merged (ΦΚΘ) | (Note: This chapter originated as Pi Alpha Chi (local) in 1923. It became the Ohio Omicron chapter of Phi Kappa Theta at the time of the national merger with Theta Kappa Phi.) |
| Pi | February 14, 1925 – 1934 | University of Nebraska–Lincoln | Lincoln, Nebraska | Inactive | (Note: This chapter originated as Nu Alpha (local) before 1925. Although the chapter was inactive at the time of the national merger, it later became the Nebraska Pi chapter of Phi Kappa Theta.) |
| Rho | February 11, 1925 – April 29, 1959 | Carnegie Mellon University | Pittsburgh, Pennsylvania | Merged (ΦΚΘ) | (Note: This chapter originated as Kappa Epsilon (local) in 1923. It became the Pennsylvania Rho chapter of Phi Kappa Theta at the time of the national merger with Theta Kappa Phi.) |
| Sigma | May 23, 1925 – April 29, 1959 | Rensselaer Polytechnic Institute | Troy, New York | Merged (ΦΚΘ) | (Note: This chapter originated as Delta Delta (local) in 1923. It became the New York Sigma chapter of Phi Kappa Theta at the time of the national merger with Theta Kappa Phi.) |
| Tau | June 13, 1925 – 1935 | Syracuse University | Syracuse, New York | Inactive | (Note: This chapter originated as Phi Iota Chi (local) in 1921. Although the chapter was inactive at the time of the national merger, it later became the New York Tau chapter of Phi Kappa Theta.) |
| Upsilon | 1926–1935 | University of Maine | Orono, Maine | Inactive | (Note: Although the chapter was inactive at the time of the national merger, it later became the Maine Upsilon chapter of Phi Kappa Theta.) |
| Phi | February 5, 1927 – 1933; 1949 – April 29, 1959 | University of Denver | Denver, Colorado | Merged (ΦΚΘ) | (Note: This chapter originated as Kappa Phi Delta (local) in 1925. It became the Colorado Phi chapter of Phi Kappa Theta at the time of the national merger with Theta Kappa Phi.) |
| Chi | February 9, 1929 – 1933 | Bucknell University | Lewisburg, Pennsylvania | Inactive | (Note: This chapter originated as Kappa Gamma (local) in 1924. Although the chapter was inactive at the time of the national merger, it later became the Pennsylvania Chi chapter of Phi Kappa Theta.) |
| Psi | January 19, 1929 – April 29, 1959 | Ohio University | Athens, Ohio | Merged (ΦΚΘ) | (Note: This chapter originated as Rho Mu Phi (local) in 1928. It became the Ohio Psi chapter of Phi Kappa Theta at the time of the national merger with Theta Kappa Phi.) |
| Omega | February 1, 1930 – April 29, 1959 | Catholic University of America | Washington, D.C. | Merged (ΦΚΘ) | (Note: This chapter originated as the Dod Noon Club (local) in 1921. It became the District of Columbia Omega chapter of Phi Kappa Theta at the time of the national merger with Theta Kappa Phi.) |
| Alpha Alpha | October 14, 1939 – April 29, 1959 | Indiana University | Bloomington, Indiana | Merged (ΦΚΘ) | (Note: This chapter originated as the Torch and Skull Club (local) in 1937. It became the Indiana Alpha Alpha chapter of Phi Kappa Theta at the time of the national merger with Theta Kappa Phi.) |
| Alpha Beta | May 31, 1941 – April 29, 1959 | Case Western Reserve University | Cleveland, Ohio | Merged (ΦΚΘ) | (Note: This chapter originated as Theta Psi Kappa (local) in 1932. It became the Ohio Alpha Beta chapter of Phi Kappa Theta at the time of the national merger with Theta Kappa Phi.) |
| Alpha Gamma colony | 1943–194x ? | Trine University | Angola, Indiana | Inactive | (Note: Regarding the Trine (Tri-State) chapter, there was a Catholic club on that campus beginning in 1929. This became a local, ΑΓΩ in 1940, and is listed as the predecessor to the existing ΦΚΘ chapter. However, it may be that this group of Catholic students signed up as a colony with ΦΚ in 1943, a colony that was named but (apparently) never installed as a chapter. Alternatively, that effort may have simply incorporated another set of Catholic students. It's a moot point today, as Phi Kappa and Theta Kappa Phi would merge in 1959 to form Phi Kappa Theta, with a chapter placed on campus in 1966 - chapter records may have further information.) (Note: This colony was named, but never installed A later chapter of ΦΚΘ was installed in 1966, called Indiana Alpha Gamma chapter of Phi Kappa Theta..) |
| Alpha Delta | December 1, 1946 – April 29, 1959 | Washington State University | Pullman, Washington | Merged (ΦΚΘ) | (Note: This chapter originated as Chi Nu Chi (local) in 1940. It became the Washington Alpha Delta chapter of Phi Kappa Theta at the time of the national merger with Theta Kappa Phi.) |
| Alpha Epsilon | November 23, 1947 – April 29, 1959 | University of Minnesota | Minneapolis, Minnesota | Merged (ΦΚΘ) | (Note: This chapter originated as a Phi Kappa colony in 1947. It became the Minnesota Alpha Epsilon chapter of Phi Kappa Theta at the time of the national merger with Theta Kappa Phi.) |
| Alpha Zeta | October 21, 1950 – April 29, 1959 | University of Wyoming | Laramie, Wyoming | Merged (ΦΚΘ) | (Note: This chapter originated as Phi Kappa colony in 1949. It became the Wyoming Alpha Zeta chapter of Phi Kappa Theta at the time of the national merger with Theta Kappa Phi.) |
| Alpha Eta | November 25, 1950 – April 29, 1959 | Manhattan College | Riverdale, Bronx, New York | Merged (ΦΚΘ) | (Note: This chapter originated as Gamma Sigma (local) before 1950. It became the New York Alpha Eta chapter of Phi Kappa Theta at the time of the national merger with Theta Kappa Phi.) |
| Alpha Theta | 1951 – April 29, 1959 | Oregon State University | Corvallis, Oregon | Merged (ΦΚΘ) | (Note: This chapter originated as a Phi Kappa colony in 1950. It became the Oregon Alpha Theta chapter of Phi Kappa Theta at the time of the national merger with Theta Kappa Phi.) |
| Alpha Iota | May 6, 1951 – April 29, 1959 | University of Arizona | Tucson, Arizona | Merged (ΦΚΘ) | (Note: This chapter originated as Phi Kappa Kappa (local) in 1950. It became the Arizona Alpha Iota chapter of Phi Kappa Theta at the time of the national merger with Theta Kappa Phi.) |
| Alpha Kappa | May 17, 1953 – April 29, 1959 | Butler University | Indianapolis, Indiana | Merged (ΦΚΘ) | (Note: This chapter originated as Phi Kappa Beta (local) in 1950. It became the Indiana Alpha Kappa chapter of Phi Kappa Theta at the time of the national merger with Theta Kappa Phi.) |
| Alpha Lambda | April 17, 1955 – April 29, 1959 | Spring Hill College | Mobile, Alabama | Merged (ΦΚΘ) | (Note: This chapter originated as Sigma Alpha Kappa (local) in 1943. It became the Alabama Alpha Lambda chapter of Phi Kappa Theta at the time of the national merger with Theta Kappa Phi.) |
| Alpha Mu | February 18, 1956 – April 29, 1959 | University of Houston | Houston, Texas | Merged (ΦΚΘ) | (Note: This chapter originated as Phi Kappa Alpha (local) in 1952. It became the Texas Alpha Mu chapter of Phi Kappa Theta at the time of the national merger with Theta Kappa Phi.) |
| Alpha Nu | April 8, 1956 – April 29, 1959 | Loyola Marymount University | Los Angeles, California | Merged (ΦΚΘ) | (Note: This chapter originated as Phi Delta Chi (local) before 1956. It became the California Alpha Nu chapter of Phi Kappa Theta at the time of the national merger with Theta Kappa Phi.) |
| Alpha Xi | November 24, 1957 – April 29, 1959 | Duquesne University | Pittsburgh, Pennsylvania | Merged (ΦΚΘ) | (Note: This chapter originated as Kappa Sigma Phi (local) in 1924. It became the Pennsylvania Alpha Xi chapter of Phi Kappa Theta at the time of the national merger with Theta Kappa Phi.) |
| Alpha Omicron | 1958 – April 29, 1959 | Northern Arizona University | Flagstaff, Arizona | Merged (ΦΚΘ) | (Note: This chapter originated as a Phi Kappa colony in 1957. It became the Arizona Alpha Omicron chapter of Phi Kappa Theta at the time of the national merger with Theta Kappa Phi.) |
| Alpha Pi | April 5, 1959 – April 29, 1959 | University of Texas at Austin | Austin, Texas | Merged (ΦΚΘ) | (Note: This chapter originated as the Catholic Club (local) in 1956. It became the Texas Alpha Pi chapter of Phi Kappa Theta at the time of the national merger with Theta Kappa Phi.) |
