= Theta Kappa Phi =

Defunct Catholic collegiate fraternity

- ΘΚΦ
- Founded: October 1, 1919; 107 years ago Lehigh University
- Type: Social
- Former affiliation: NIC
- Status: Merged
- Merge date: April 29, 1959
- Successor: Phi Kappa Theta
- Emphasis: Catholic students
- Scope: National
- Member badge
- Colors: Red, Silver, and Gold
- Symbol: Sun
- Flower: Columbine
- Publication: The Sun of Theta Kappa Phi
- Chapters: 23
- Members: 4,000+ lifetime
- Headquarters: United States

Theta Kappa Phi (ΘΚΦ) was an American social fraternity for Catholics founded on October 1, 1919, at Lehigh University in Bethlehem, Pennsylvania. On April 29, 1959, it merged with a similar Catholic fraternity, Phi Kappa, to form Phi Kappa Theta.

== History ==
The idea for the organization developed from a group of men who were a part of the university’s Newman Club, who had met in 1914. Plans for the official establishment of the fraternity fell through upon the entry of the United States into the First World War in 1917, with several members subsequently joining the armed forces. Of the original group, three returned to Lehigh at the end of hostilities to resume their studies, including Raymond J. Bobbin, Peter J. Carr, and August Concilio.

Following the conclusion of the war in November 1918 and the return of members to college, Carr led efforts to restart the process of establishing a social fraternity at Lehigh. Ultimately thirty men, including Concilio, Carr, and Bobbin, agreed to the establishment of the X Club, the original name of Theta Kappa Phi.

During the first few months of the new fraternity’s existence, several important actions were undertaken. In a meeting on November 12, 1919, the X Club would select Theta Kappa Phi as its new name. At the time of its adoption, the letters simply stood in place for ‘The Catholic Fraternity’ before they were given a secret meaning later upon merger into Phi Kappa Theta in 1959. The founding group would elect Concilio as the fraternity’s first President. Carr successfully began the infant fraternity’s nationalization by unifying with Kappa Theta fraternity at Pennsylvania State University, establishing the group there as its Beta chapter on March 22, 1922.

Meanwhile, the fraternity would receive valuable help and inspiring leadership from local Bethlehem pastor, Rev. William I. McGarvey. Since none of the existing members had fraternity experience, McGarvey was a valuable asset in developing the fledgling group into a true fraternity in its early days. McGarvey would additionally secure the help of Rev. Michael Andrew Chapman in writing Theta Kappa Phi’s ritual, who was an Episcopal priest as well as a member of Sigma Alpha Epsilon at Bard College. The basics of Theta Kappa Phi’s ritual are still used in Phi Kappa Theta’s ritual today, while McGarvey’s effort for Theta Kappa Phi gained him recognition as the fraternity’s fourth founder.

Theta Kappa Phi continued to expand to other colleges and universities in the surrounding region. On April 29, 1959, Theta Kappa Phi merged with a similar Catholic fraternity, Phi Kappa, to form Phi Kappa Theta. At the time the merger, Theta Kappa Phi had 24 active chapters across the United States. It had 4,000 members in 1957.

== Symbols ==
The Greek letters Theta Kappa Phi were selected to stand for "The Catholic Fraternity".

The badge of Theta Kappa Phi was a gold shield with a black enamel center that featured the Greek letters ΘΚΦ, over a golden heart. The badge was bordered with crown-set pearls, and four rubies in the form of a cross. Its pledge pin was a white shield, bordered with a gold chain that enclosed a golden sun.

The fraternity's colors were red, silver, and gold. Its flower was the Columbine. Its publications was The Sun of Theta Kappa Phi.

== Chapters ==
Following are the chapters of Theta Kappa Phi, with inactive chapters in italics.

Chapter	Charter date and range	Institution	Location	Status	Ref.
Alpha	October 1, 1919 – April 29, 1959	Lehigh University	Bethlehem, Pennsylvania	Merged (ΦΚΘ)	(Note: Chapter formed from the X Club (local), established in 1914. It became the Pennsylvania Alpha chapter of Phi Kappa Theta with the national merger of the two fraternities.)
Beta	March 24, 1922 – April 29, 1959	Pennsylvania State University	University Park, Pennsylvania	Merged (ΦΚΘ)	(Note: Chapter formed from Kappa Theta (local), established in 1920. It became the Pennsylvania Beta Gamma chapter of Phi Kappa Theta with the national merger of the two fraternities.)
Gamma	May 9, 1922 – April 29, 1959	Ohio State University	Columbus, Ohio	Merged (ΦΚΘ)	(Note: Chapter formed from Iota Lambda (local), established in 1920. It became the Ohio Gamma Theta chapter of Phi Kappa Theta with the national merger of the two fraternities.)
Delta	May 12, 1923 – April 29, 1959	University of Illinois	Champaign and Urbana, Illinois	Merged (ΦΚΘ)	(Note: Chapter formed from Phi Lambda Pi (local), established in 1921. It became the Illinois Beta Delta chapter of Phi Kappa Theta with the national merger of the two fraternities.)
Epsilon	May 9, 1924 – April 29, 1959	University of New Hampshire	Durham, New Hampshire	Merged (ΦΚΘ)	(Note: Chapter formed from Nu Sigma Mu (local), established in 1922. It became the New Hampshire Epsilon chapter of Phi Kappa Theta with the national merger of the two fraternities.)
Zeta	April 9, 1925 – April 29, 1959	Ohio Northern University	Ada, Ohio	Merged (ΦΚΘ)	(Note: Chapter formed from the Newman Club, established in 1923. It became the Ohio Zeta chapter of Phi Kappa Theta with the national merger of the two fraternities.)
Eta	June 25, 1925 – April 29, 1959	City College of New York	New York City, New York	Merged (ΦΚΘ)	(Note: Chapter formed from Pi Theta Phi (local), established in 1921. It became the New York Eta chapter of Phi Kappa Theta with the national merger of the two fraternities.)
Theta	June 1, 1927 – 1931	Cornell University	Ithaca, New York	Inactive	(Note: Chapter formed from Phi Kappa Theta (local), established in 1924 and unrelated to the national fraternity of the same name. It became the New York Theta chapter of Phi Kappa Theta with the national merger of the two fraternities.)
Iota	May 22, 1932 – April 29, 1959	Temple University	Philadelphia, Pennsylvania	Merged (ΦΚΘ)	(Note: Chapter formed from Chi Lambda Phi (local), established in 1926. It became the Pennsylvania Iota chapter of Phi Kappa Theta with the national merger of the two fraternities.)
Kappa	January 4, 1934 – April 29, 1959	University of Oklahoma	Norman, Oklahoma	Merged (ΦΚΘ)	(Note: Chapter formed from Delta Phi Epsilon (local), established in 1930. It became the Oklahoma Kappa chapter of Phi Kappa Theta with the national merger of the two fraternities.)
Lambda	November 10, 1935 – April 29, 1959	Worcester Polytechnic Institute	Worcester, Massachusetts	Merged (ΦΚΘ)	(Note: Chapter formed from the Friars Club, established in 1930. It became the Massachusetts Lambda chapter of Phi Kappa Theta with the national merger of the two fraternities.)
Mu	November 29, 1936 – April 29, 1959	Missouri School of Mines and Metallurgy	Worcester, Massachusetts	Merged (ΦΚΘ)	(Note: Chapter formed from the Cardinal Mercier Club (local), established in 1925. It became the Missouri Mu chapter of Phi Kappa Theta with the national merger of the two fraternities.)
Nu	May 2, 1937 – April 29, 1959	Oklahoma State University	Stillwater, Oklahoma	Merged (ΦΚΘ)	(Note: Chapter formed from the Friars Club, established in 1936. It became the Oklahoma Nu chapter of Phi Kappa Theta with the national merger of the two fraternities.)
Xi	April 14, 1938 – April 29, 1959	Louisiana State University	Baton Rouge, Louisiana	Merged (ΦΚΘ)	(Note: Became the Louisiana Xi chapter of Phi Kappa Theta with the national merger of the two fraternities.)
Omicron	May 4, 1941 – April 29, 1959	University of Louisiana at Lafayette	Lafayette, Louisiana	Merged (ΦΚΘ)	(Note: Became the Louisiana Omicron chapter of Phi Kappa Theta with the national merger of the two fraternities.)
Pi	April 10, 1948 – April 29, 1959	St. Louis University	St. Louis, Missouri	Merged (ΦΚΘ)	(Note: Chapter formed from Delta Nu (local), established in 1933. It became the Missouri Kappa Kappa chapter of Phi Kappa Theta with the national merger of the two fraternities.)
Rho	October 23, 1948 – April 29, 1959	Mississippi State University	Starkville, Mississippi	Merged (ΦΚΘ)	(Note: Became the Missouri Rho chapter of Phi Kappa Theta with the national merger of the two fraternities.)
Sigma	March 13, 1949 – April 29, 1959	Boston University	Boston, Massachusetts	Merged (ΦΚΘ)	(Note: Became the Massachusetts Sigma chapter of Phi Kappa Theta with the national merger of the two fraternities.)
Tau	April 10, 1949 – April 29, 1959	Saint Francis University	Loretto, Pennsylvania	Merged (ΦΚΘ)	(Note: Chapter formed from Iota Chi Mu (local), established in 1947. It became the Pennsylvania Tau chapter of Phi Kappa Theta with the national merger of the two fraternities.)
Upsilon	May 21, 1949 – April 29, 1959	University of Missouri	Columbia, Missouri	Merged (ΦΚΘ)	(Note: Became the Missouri Kappa Upsilon chapter of Phi Kappa Theta with the national merger of the two fraternities.)
Phi	December 4, 1949 – April 29, 1959	Kent State University	Kent, Ohio	Merged (ΦΚΘ)	(Note: Chapter formed from the Friars Club, established in 1947. It became the Ohio Phi chapter of Phi Kappa Theta with the national merger of the two fraternities.)
Chi	April 15, 1951 – April 29, 1959	University of Mississippi	Oxford, Mississippi	Merged (ΦΚΘ)	(Note: Became the Mississippi Chi chapter of Phi Kappa Theta with the national merger of the two fraternities.)
Psi	December 11, 1954 – April 29, 1959	Northern Illinois University	DeKalb, Illinois	Merged (ΦΚΘ)	(Note: Became the Illinois Psi chapter of Phi Kappa Theta with the national merger of the two fraternities.)
Omega	May 18, 1957 – April 29, 1959	University of Detroit Mercy	Detroit, Michigan	Merged (ΦΚΘ)	(Note: Became the Michigan Omega chapter of Phi Kappa Theta with the national merger of the two fraternities.)
UW Colony		University of Wisconsin–Madison	Madison, Wisconsin	Merged (ΦΚΘ)	(Note: This colony was established in 1954. With the national merger of the two fraternities, it joined the Wisconsin Lambda chapter of Phi Kappa Theta, established by a pre-existing chapter of Phi Kappa.)

== See also ==
- List of social fraternities
- Christian fraternities
