= Alpha Sigma Kappa =

American collegiate technology sorority

- ΑΣΚ
- Founded: May 1, 1989; 37 years ago University of Minnesota
- Type: Social
- Affiliation: Independent
- Status: Active
- Scope: National
- Motto: A Posse Ad Esse "From Possibility to Reality"
- Colors: Royal Blue and Silver
- Symbol: Infinity sign
- Flower: White carnation and white rose
- Jewel: Blue Topaz
- Mascot: Lioness
- Philanthropy: DonorsChoose
- Chapters: 16
- Members: 700+ active 3,000+ lifetime
- Headquarters: United States
- Website: ask-wits.com

Alpha Sigma Kappa – Women in Technical Studies (ΑΣΚ – WiTS) is a social sorority for women in the fields of mathematics, architecture, engineering, technology and the sciences.

The sorority was founded at the University of Minnesota in 1989 by a group of women who had formerly been affiliated with the Sisters of Triangle Fraternity program. Alpha Sigma Kappa became a national organization in 1996.

== History ==
Alpha Sigma Kappa originally grew from a Little Sisters of Triangle organization at the University of Minnesota. In the late 1980s, Little Sister programs were being phased out by fraternal organizations across the country; Triangle Fraternity's National Council resolved to do so with their local Little Sisters organizations. To maintain a formal relationship, the University of Minnesota's Little Sisters group chose to found Alpha Sigma Kappa. The sorority was created on May 1, 1989, by eighteen Founding Sisters. The founding sisters include:

- Sonja (Antolik) (Fisher) Jones
- Jacqueline (Dandurand) Seal
- Jean Etzell
- Kelly (Gram) Riehle
- Jennifer (Holland) Richards
- Mara Hollinbeck
- Sharon Kosmalski
- Sara Krawlewski
- Melissa (Matschiner) Taphorn
- Donna Monson
- Nicholie (Olsen) Bufkin
- Jennifer (Parker) Zylko
- Cheryl (Perusich) Kussow
- Ann (Romani) Felteau
- Karen (Schlangen) Steele
- Leanne Wolske
- Joan Zak
- Elizabeth Zimmermann

When Alpha Sigma Kappa was founded, scientific careers were filled primarily by men. In 1989, only seventeen percent of the students enrolled in the Institute of Technology at the University of Minnesota were female. The Founding Sisters of the organization wished to create a sorority dedicated to supporting women who entered these fields. Alpha Sigma Kappa was intended to bring women pursuing technical studies together in a social setting: working to develop, encourage, and support the academic and social needs of these women. At the time of its founding, Alpha Sigma Kappa was the only social sorority for technical women whose scope included those in architecture and non-engineering sciences.

The stated purpose of Alpha Sigma Kappa is to promote friendship, academic achievement, unity within the organization, and philanthropy throughout the community. The sorority supports women in their academic goals and promotes women in technical fields through leadership, friendship, and support.

On March 4, 1996, an Interest Group of women was formed at the University of Oklahoma, which would ultimately become the Beta chapter on September 13, 1997. The National Organization of Alpha Sigma Kappa was officially formed on April 29, 1996, at the first national meeting in Minneapolis, Minnesota. Between 1999 and 2005, four more chapters were installed. In 2010, Alpha Sigma Kappa became the first sorority established on the campus of New Mexico Tech. Since 2015, the organization's growth has accelerated rapidly, establishing a presence on an additional ten universities across the United States as a social sorority for women in STEM.

The National Organization of Alpha Sigma Kappa is not affiliated with a National Panhellenic governing body; however, chapters may be affiliated with councils at their respective universities. As of 2025, it has initiated 3,000+ members and has 400+ active collegiate members in fifteen chapters.

== Symbols ==
The Greek letters Alpha Sigma Kappa represent social aspects; "Women in Technical Studies" specifies its membership. The sorority's colors are royal blue and silver. Its flower is the white rose and its jewel is the blue topaz. Alpha Sigma Kappa's symbols are the infinity sign and the lioness. Its motto is A Posse Ad Esse or "From Possibility to Reality".

== Membership ==
Active membership in Alpha Sigma Kappa requires that a student pursues a major with a minimum of 1/3 of all credit hours in architecture, computer science, engineering, mathematics, physical sciences, or biological sciences, with a minimum of 1/6 of all credit hours as upper division courses in these fields. Specific majors at each university are defined in the respective chapter or Petitioning Group bylaws.

Once a woman is Initiated, her membership is for a lifetime. Alumnae remain connected through alumnae chapters as well as informal networks of social and professional support.

== Philanthropy ==
The National philanthropy for Alpha Sigma Kappa is DonorsChoose. Individual chapters may choose local classroom projects to support through this organization, emphasizing assisting STEM projects.

Additionally, chapters of Alpha Sigma Kappa organize and participate in local philanthropic events in their communities. Many events work to promote science and technical careers to young women. However, these events provide direct service or raise funds for a variety of nonprofit organizations, including: the American Cancer Society, Charity: Water, Girl Scouts of the USA, and the Susan G Komen Foundation.

In 2014, the Alpha Sigma Kappa Educational Foundation, a 501(c)(3) organization, was created to support women in technical fields by managing academic scholarships.

== Chapters ==
=== Collegiate chapters ===
Following is a list of collegiate chapters of the Alpha Sigma Kappa sorority. Active chapters are indicated in bold; inactive chapters are in italics.

Chapter	Charter date and range	Institution	Location	Status	Ref.
**Alpha**	May 1, 1989	University of Minnesota	Minneapolis, Minnesota	Active	(Note: Chapter formed from Triangle Little Sisters (local chapter), established in 1983.)
**Beta**	September 13, 1997	University of Oklahoma	Norman, Oklahoma	Active	(Note: Chapter was established as a colony a year before being chartered.)
Gamma	April 1, 2000 – 2007	University of Louisville	Louisville, Kentucky	Inactive	
Delta	October 27, 2001 – 2006	University of Texas at Arlington	Arlington, Texas	Inactive	
**Epsilon**	October 23, 2004	Iowa State University	Ames, Iowa	Active	
Zeta	March 5, 2005 – 2023	University of Maryland, Baltimore County	Baltimore County, Maryland	Inactive	
**Eta**	December 4, 2010	New Mexico Institute of Mining and Technology	Socorro, New Mexico	Active	
**Theta**	March 28, 2015	Colorado State University	Fort Collins, Colorado	Active	
**Iota**	March 5, 2016	University of New Haven	West Haven, Connecticut	Active	
**Kappa**	April 15, 2016	University of Kansas	Lawrence, Kansas	Active	
**Mu**	April 14, 2018	University of Richmond	Richmond, Virginia	Active	
**Nu**	September 15, 2018	University of Central Florida	Orlando, Florida	Active	
Lambda	January 26, 2019 – 2021	DePaul University	Chicago, Illinois	Inactive	
**Xi**	February 9, 2019	University of California, Santa Barbara	Santa Barbara, California	Active	
**Omicron**	November 16, 2019	Virginia Tech	Blacksburg, Virginia	Active	
**Rho**	October 2, 2021	University of South Florida	Tampa, Florida	Active	
**Pi**	February 12, 2022	Boston University	Boston, Massachusetts	Active	
**Sigma**	April 1, 2023	University of Tennessee	Knoxville, Tennessee	Active	
**Tau**	March 30, 2024	University of Pittsburgh	Pittsburgh, Pennsylvania	Active	
**Upsilon**	December 6, 2025	University of Maryland	College Park, Maryland	Active	
**Phi**	March 28, 2026	Grand Valley State University	Allendale, Michigan	Active	

=== Alumnae chapters ===
Following is a list of the alumnae chapters of the Alpha Sigma Kappa sorority. Active chapters are indicated in bold; inactive chapters are in italics.

Chapter	Charter date	Institution	Location	Status	Ref.
Alpha Alumnae		University of Minnesota Twin Cities Campus	Minneapolis, Minnesota	Active	
Beta Alumnae		University of Oklahoma	Norman, Oklahoma	Active	
Epsilon Alumnae		Iowa State University	Ames, Iowa	Active	
Zeta Alumnae		University of Maryland, Baltimore County	Baltimore, Maryland	Active	
Iota Alumnae		University of New Haven	West Haven, Connecticut	Active	
Theta Alumnae		Colorado State University	Fort Collins, Colorado	Active	

== See also ==
- List of social fraternities and sororities
- Professional fraternities and sororities
