= Otis Barton =

American diver and actor (1899–1992)

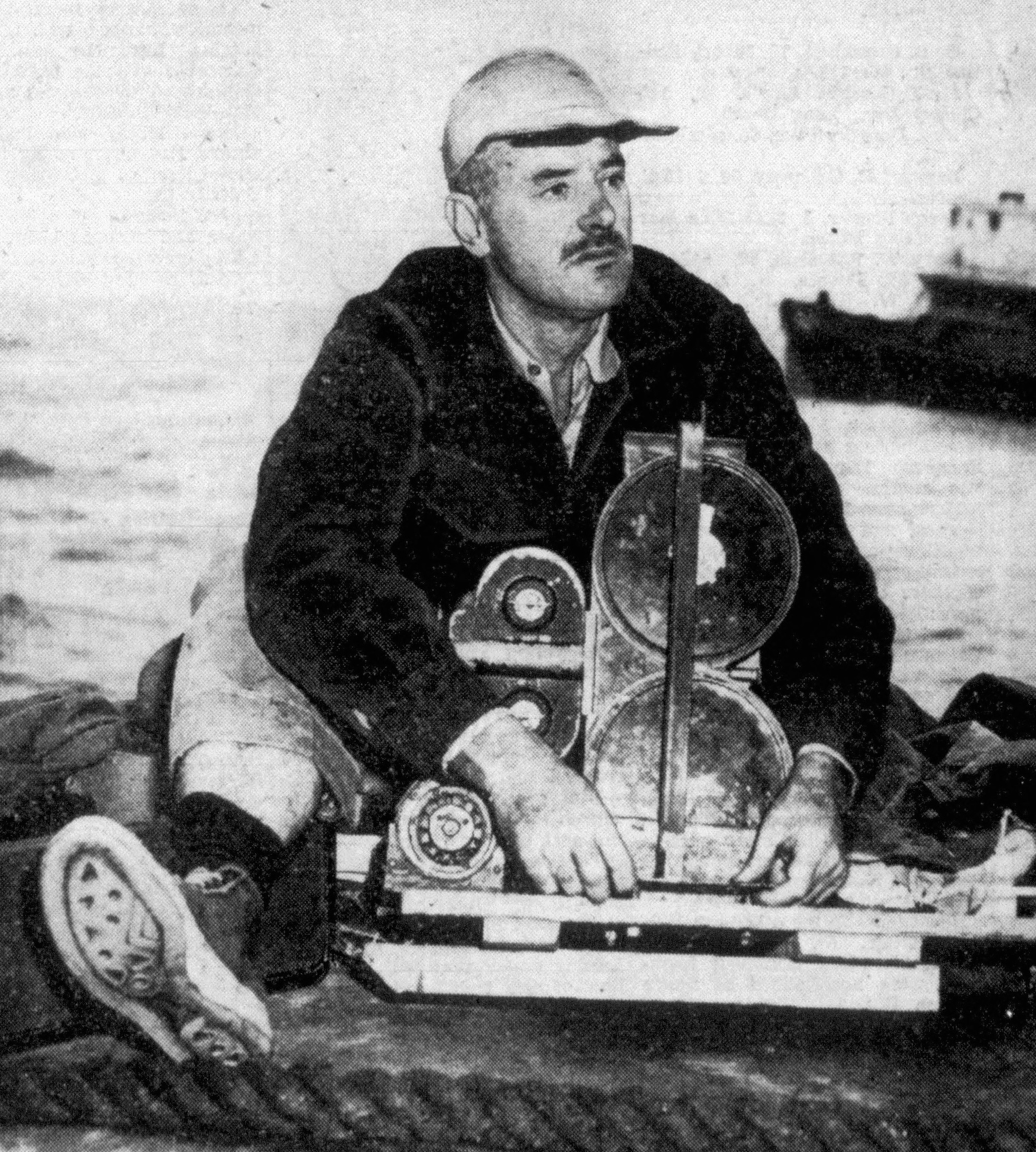
- Barton in 1949.
- Born: Frederick Otis Barton Jr. June 5, 1899; New York, U.S.
- Died: April 15, 1992 (aged 92)
- Education: Harvard College
- Occupations: Deep-sea diver, inventor, actor

Frederick Otis Barton Jr. (June 5, 1899 – April 15, 1992) was an American deep-sea diver, inventor and actor.

== Early life and career ==
Born in New York, the independently wealthy Barton designed the first bathysphere and made a dive with William Beebe off Bermuda in June 1930. They set the first record for deep-sea diving by descending 600 ft (180 m). In 1934, they set another record at 3,028 ft (923 m). Barton acted in the 1938 Hollywood movie, Titans of the Deep.

== Later career ==
In 1949, Barton set a new world record with a 4,500 foot (1,372 m) dive in the Pacific Ocean, using his benthoscope (from the Greek benthos, meaning 'sea bottom', and scopein, 'to view'), which was designed by Barton and Maurice Nelles.

Barton wrote the book The World Beneath the Sea, published in 1953. Like Beebe, Barton was also interested in exploring tropical rain forests, and spent considerable time in places like Gabon. In 1978, Barton successfully tested a "jungle spaceship" (actually an airship) that was intended to film wildlife.

== Taxon described by him ==
- See Category:Taxa named by Frederick Otis Barton Jr.
