= Benthoscope =

Unpowered spherical deep-sea observation submersible lowered on a cable

The Benthoscope was a deep sea submersible designed by Otis Barton after the Second World War. He hired the Watson-Stillman Company, who had earlier constructed his and William Beebe's bathysphere, to produce the new design of deep diving vessel, which was named from the Greek benthos, meaning "bottom".

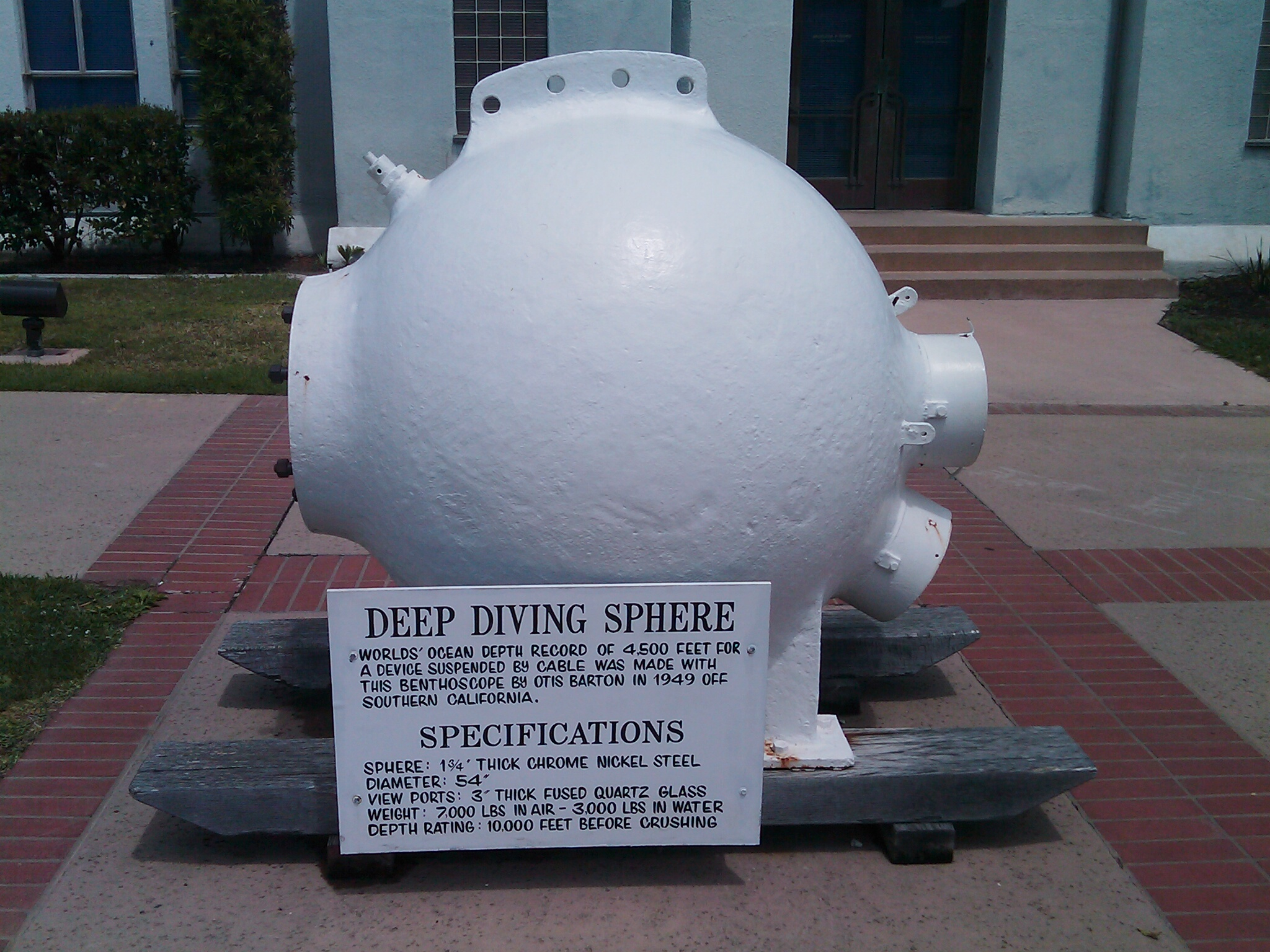
Benthoscope at the Los Angeles Maritime Museum

The Benthoscope was essentially similar to the bathysphere, but was built to withstand higher pressures, with a crush depth of 10,000 feet (3,000 m). Its internal diameter was 4.5 feet (1.4 m), and its wall thickness was 1.75 inches (44 mm). It weighed 7 short tons (6,400 kg), an increase in weight of 1,600 pounds (730 kg) over the bathysphere. Two windows of fused quartz were installed, one facing straight ahead and the other diagonally down. Other arrangements followed the bathysphere, with oxygen supplied from cylinders, and calcium chloride and soda lime used to absorb moisture and CO_{2} respectively.

In August 1949, Barton established a new world depth record with a solo descent to 4,500 feet (1,400 m), which remains the deepest dive by a submersible suspended by a cable.

The Benthoscope is now on display in front of the Los Angeles Maritime Museum in San Pedro, California.

== See also ==
- Timeline of diving technology – Chronological list of notable events in the history of underwater diving equipment
- Diving chamber – Hyperbaric pressure vessel for human occupation used in diving operations
- Diving bell – Chamber for transporting divers vertically through the water
- Bathysphere – Unpowered spherical deep-sea observation submersible lowered on a cable
