= Phi Kappa Theta =

North American collegiate fraternity

- ΦΚΘ
- Founded: April 29, 1889; 137 years ago (Phi Kappa); Brown University; October 1, 1919; 106 years ago (Theta Kappa Phi); Lehigh University; April 29, 1959; 67 years ago (merger as Phi Kappa Theta); Ohio State University
- Type: Social
- Affiliation: NIC
- Status: Active
- Scope: National (US)
- Motto: "Give, expecting nothing thereof"
- Colors: Cardinal Purple; Gold; White
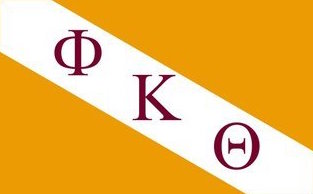
- Flag
- Flower: Red Tea Rose
- Publication: The Temple
- Philanthropy: Children's Miracle Network Hospital
- Chapters: 36
- Colonies: 1
- Headquarters: 6510 Telecom Drive Ste. 370; Indianapolis, Indiana 46278; United States
- Website: phikaps.org

Phi Kappa Theta (ΦΚΘ), commonly known as Phi Kap, is a national social fraternity that has over 35 active chapters and colonies at universities across 21 U.S. states. The fraternity was founded on April 29, 1959, at Ohio State University in Columbus, Ohio, with the agreed-upon merger of two older Catholic fraternities, Phi Kappa and Theta Kappa Phi. Phi Kappa was founded exactly 70 years prior in 1889 at Brown University in Providence, Rhode Island, while Theta Kappa Phi was founded later in October 1919 at Lehigh University in Bethlehem, Pennsylvania.

Despite it being the merger of two historically Catholic fraternities, membership to Phi Kappa Theta is open to interested men of all faiths and is no longer exclusive to just those who are Catholic.

== History ==
=== Phi Kappa (1889–1959) ===
Phi Kappa was founded on April 29, 1889, at Hope Hall of Brown University in Providence, Rhode Island. At the time of its founding, the fraternity was the tenth such Greek letter organization existing at Brown, but the first to accept Catholic students. This is shown in the choice of Phi Kappa's original name: Phi Kappa Sigma, which stood as the Greek letter equivalent for "Fraternity of Catholic Students". Its nine founders, present at the October 1 meeting, were:

- Dennis Joseph Holland
- Joseph Mary Killelea
- James Martin Gillrain
- Edward S. Kiley
- Edward DeVallie O’Connor
- James Edward Brennan
- Arthur Francis McGinn
- James Edward Smith
- Edward Francis Cunningham

Gillrain was elected from the group as Phi Kappa Sigma's first president, while McGinn became the first secretary. The infant fraternity would meet in the dormitories of Hope College until the spring of 1890 when meetings moved to the Wayland Building.

The History notes that the first three initiates were: William H. Magill, John J. Fitzgerald, and Thomas P. Corcoran. In addition to the nine listed founders, Baird's Manual, 20th ed. adds these first three initiates, along with Joseph Kirwen, as the fraternity's founders, for a total of 13.

On April 29, 1892, a meeting of Phi Kappa Sigma's graduate and collegiate members was called by M. Joseph Harson, a Providence merchant with an interest in the fraternity. It was here at this meeting that a plan was put forward for the fraternity's official establishment at Brown. Harson wrote the initiation ritual, while the group would adopt a constitution, a form of organization for the chapter, and elect Harson as president. The fraternity would go on to initiate its first new members in 1893. Ten years later on April 29, 1902, the fraternity, now known as Phi Kappa, would be incorporated under the laws of the State of Rhode Island. Over another decade, Phi Kappa's Beta chapter would be founded through the incorporation of the Loyola Club of the University of Illinois on May 27, 1912.

Over the following years, Phi Kappa would expand to several universities across the United States, particularly around the Midwest and Northeast. Five additional chapters would be founded by 1919, bringing the total to seven nationwide. Over the next decade, Phi Kappa would see major expansion, tripling in size by the time of the fraternity's 40th anniversary year in 1929.

Five chapters alone were founded within the first half of 1925, four of whom continue to be active today. The rapid growth Phi Kappa enjoyed would largely disappear in the subsequent two decades. The Great Depression gripping the United States in the 1930s and its entry into the Second World War in 1941 would see only five new chapters chartered between 1930 and 1950. A third of Phi Kappa's chapters, including the Alpha chapter at Brown, would go inactive during the Great Depression. Steady growth would resume in Phi Kappa's final years during the 1950s. At the time of the merger in 1959, 36 of the 39 Phi Kappa chapters chartered were still open and active, including the Alpha chapter at Brown University.

=== Theta Kappa Phi (1919–1959) ===
Theta Kappa Phi was founded on October 1, 1919, at Lehigh University in Bethlehem, Pennsylvania. The idea for the organization developed from a group of men who were a part of the university's Newman Club that were interested in establishing a social fraternity. Of this original group, three men would go on to be the first members and founders of Theta Kappa Phi:

- August Concilio
- Peter J. Carr
- Raymond J. Bobbin

Plans for the official establishment of the fraternity fell through upon the entry of the United States into the First World War in 1917, with several members subsequently joining the armed forces. Following the conclusion of the war in November 1918 and the return of members back to school, Carr led efforts to restart the process of establishing a social fraternity at Lehigh. Ultimately thirty men, including Concilio, Carr, and Bobbin, agreed to the establishment of the X Club, the original name of Theta Kappa Phi.

During the first few months of the new fraternity's existence, several important actions were undertaken. In a meeting on November 12, 1919, the X Club would select Theta Kappa Phi as its new name. At the time of its adoption, the letters simply stood in place for ‘The Catholic Fraternity’ before they were given a secret meaning later on upon merger into Phi Kappa Theta in 1959. The founding group would elect Concilio as the fraternity's first president. Under him, he successfully began the infant fraternity's nationalization by unifying with the local fraternity of Kappa Theta at Pennsylvania State University, establishing the group there as its Beta chapter on March 22, 1922.

Meanwhile, the fraternity would receive valuable help and inspiring leadership from local Bethlehem pastor, Rev. William I. McGarvey. Since none of the existing members had fraternity experience, McGarvey was a valuable asset in developing the fledgling group into a true fraternity in its early days. McGarvey would additionally secure the help of Rev. Michael Andrew Chapman in writing Theta Kappa Phi's ritual, who was an Episcopal priest as well as a member of Sigma Alpha Epsilon at Bard College.

The basics of Theta Kappa Phi's ritual are still used in Phi Kappa Theta's ritual today, while McGarvey's effort for Theta Kappa Phi have seen him recognized as the fraternity's fourth founder, alongside Concilio, Carr, and Bobbin.

Theta Kappa Phi would continue to expand to other colleges and universities in the surrounding region. By the time the merger came about in 1959, Theta Kappa Phi maintained 24 open and active chapters across the United States.

=== Merger into Phi Kappa Theta ===
Phi Kappa and Theta Kappa Phi were both founded upon Catholic principles. As such, the two fraternities had extensive interactions in the years that lead up to their eventual merger. Four chapters from each would share the same host institution (University of Illinois, Pennsylvania State University, Ohio State University, and University of Missouri) by 1959. In 1921, only two years after Theta Kappa Phi's founding, Phi Kappa proposed a merger with them. However, Theta Kappa Phi declined and merged instead with Kappa Theta, a local fraternity at Penn State, in 1922. Over fifteen years would pass until talks of a potential merger began again in 1938. A joint committee, sanctioned by both fraternities and attended by representatives from both groups, was created to discuss this possibility.

Discussion and negotiations pertaining to the merger would continue over the next two decades. By 1957, both Phi Kappa and Theta Kappa Phi had 58 active chapters on 54 campuses across over 20 states. That same year, both fraternities agreed to negotiations conducted at Ohio State University towards unifying their respective fraternities. Committees from both fraternities were created towards discussion on several issues regarding the merger, including the national name, coat of arms, constitution, leadership, and ritual among many others.

In 1958, both Phi Kappa and Theta Kappa Phi simultaneously held their Biennial Conferences at Ohio State to begin final approval of the merger. On September 8, 1958, an agreement was reached, and both respective fraternities ratified the unification and authorized their respective national councils to begin implementation of the consolidation agreement. Over the following eight months, the new unified ritual was established as well as a new insignia for the united fraternity designed. Additionally, new procedures for the united fraternity was adopted, while the two fraternities alumni supervisory boards were consolidated.

It was decided that the official charter day of Phi Kappa Theta would be celebrated at Ohio State University on April 29, 1959, coinciding with the seventieth anniversary of the founding of Phi Kappa. At the time of the merger of the two fraternities, it was the first of its kind in the history of the American fraternal system. Phi Kappa's last president, Pierre Lavedan, was selected to be Phi Kappa Theta's first president, while Theta Kappa Phi's last president, Frank Flick, was selected to be Phi Kappa Theta's first chairman of the board. At the four universities where both a Phi Kappa and Theta Kappa Phi chapter existed together, the two chapters merged as well, combining their chapter names into a single designation. On December 12, 1959, the Alpha Rho chapter at Belmont Abbey College in North Carolina, would become Phi Kappa Theta's first chartered chapter, post merger.

== Ideals ==
Phi Kappa Theta is a national social fraternity founded on five ideals: Fraternal Engagement (duty to man), Intellectual (duty to self and parents), Social Impact (duty to society), Spiritual (duty towards God), and Leadership.

== Chapters ==
As of 2025, Phi Kappa Theta lists 29 active chapters and 4 colonies in the United States.

== Notable members ==
Government:

Name	Fame	Ref
John F. Kennedy	35th president of United States (Honorary)	
Eugene McCarthy	U.S. Senator (1959–1971), U.S. Congressman (1949–1959)	
Eligio "Kika" de la Garza, II	US Congressman, 15th Congressional District (1965–1997) (Texas)	
Richard J. Hughes	Governor of New Jersey (1962–1970); Chief Justice, New Jersey Supreme Court (1973–1979)	
John J. Barton	Former mayor of Indianapolis (1964–1968)	
Joseph M. Barr	Former mayor of Pittsburgh (1959–1970)	
Alfonso J. Cervantes	Former mayor of St. Louis (1965–1973)	
Paul Hardy	Former Lt. Gov. of Louisiana (1988–1992), Secretary of State Louisiana (1976–1980)	
Ali Soufan	Former FBI agent involved in multiple anti-terrorism cases (1997–2005)	

Business:

Name	Fame	Ref
Paul Allen	Co-founder Microsoft, owner of Portland Trail Blazers & Seattle Seahawks	
Paul Galvin	Founder Motorola	
Paul Allaire	Former president, chairman and CEO, Xerox	
Joseph Perella	Co-founder Perella Weinberg Partners	

Media:

Name	Fame	Ref
Ed McMahon	Actor: Announcer Tonight Show, Host Star Search	
Gene Kelly	Actor: Singin' in the Rain, Anchors Aweigh	
Bob Hope	Actor/Comedian and Famous United Service Organizations Performer (Honorary)	
Keegan-Michael Key	Comedian: MADtv, Key & Peele	
Brian Baker	Actor: Sprint PCS Commercials	
Craig Shoemaker	Actor/Comedian PA PSI	

Sports:

Name	Fame	Ref
Vince Dooley	Former head coach and athletic director at the University of Georgia. Ninth coach in NCAA Division I history to win over 200 games. Coached the University of Georgia to the 1980 National Championship and six SEC titles. Member of the College Football Hall of Fame.	
Dan Devine	College Football Hall of Fame. Arizona State University, University of Missouri, University of Notre Dame and Green Bay Packer head coach. Coached Notre Dame to the 1977 National Championship.	
Ray Meyer	DePaul men's basketball coach, 1945 NIT Championship, Basketball Hall of Fame	
Ed Macauley	AP Player of the Year, All-American at St. Louis University, member of the Basketball Hall of Fame, played for: St. Louis Hawks, Boston Celtics, NBA All-Star	
Jim Stillwagon	Lombardi Trophy and Outland Trophy winner @ Ohio State University, CFL All-Star	
Bob Aspromonte	(3rd baseman) Brooklyn Dodgers/ LA Dodgers, Houston Astros, Atlanta Braves, & New York Mets	
Theo Tran	(Professional poker player) 4 WSOP final tables, 1.8 million in cash finishes, University of Pittsburgh	
Paul Giel	(Pitcher) New York/San Francisco Giants, Pittsburgh Pirates, Minnesota Twins, Kansas City Athletics	
Ed Don George	Professional wrestler and promoter, member of Professional Wrestling Hall of Fame and Museum	

Academia:

Name	Fame	Ref
Patrick Ellis	Former president of La Salle University (1977–1992) and The Catholic University of America (1992–1998)	
William C. McInnes	Former president of Association of Jesuit Colleges and Universities (1977–1989), University of San Francisco (1972 to 1977) and Fairfield University (1964 to 1973)	

Religion:

Name	Fame	Ref
John Joseph Wright	Cardinal, Prefect of the Congregation for the Clergy	
David Allen Zubik	Bishop, Bishop of Pittsburgh	
John Krol	Cardinal, Archbishop of Philadelphia	
Donald Wuerl	Cardinal, Archbishop of Washington	

== See also ==
- List of social fraternities and sororities
