= Triangle Fraternity =

North American collegiate fraternity

- Founded: April 15, 1907; 118 years ago University of Illinois at Urbana–Champaign
- Type: Social
- Affiliation: NIC
- Status: Active
- Emphasis: Engineering, architecture, and science
- Scope: National
- Motto: Veritas Omnia Vincit "Truth Conquers All"
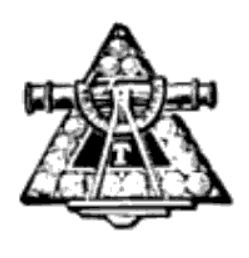
- Member badge
- Colors: Old Rose and Gray
- Symbol: Engineers' transit
- Flag
- Flower: White chrysanthemum
- Publication: Triangle Review
- Philanthropy: FIRST
- Chapters: 34
- Colonies: 3
- Members: 1,200+ active 26,000+ lifetime
- Headquarters: 120 South Center St; Plainfield, Indiana 46168; United States
- Website: www.triangle.org

Triangle Fraternity is an American collegiate fraternity for male students majoring in engineering, architecture, and the physical, mathematical, biological, and computer sciences.

Triangle Fraternity organized at the University of Illinois at Urbana–Champaign in the fall of 1906 and was incorporated by the state of Illinois on 15 April 1907, which is celebrated each year as Founders' Day.

As of 2025 there are 34 chapters and three colonies of Triangle Fraternity active in the U.S. The headquarters is located in Plainfield, Indiana in a historic building erected as a Carnegie library in 1912.

== History ==
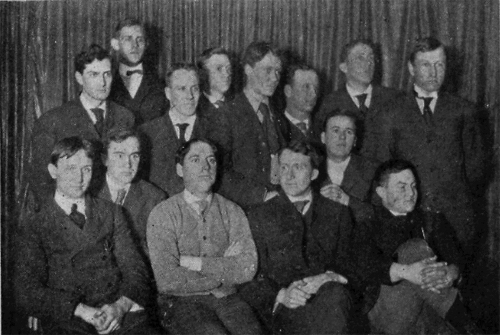
The founders of Triangle Fraternity

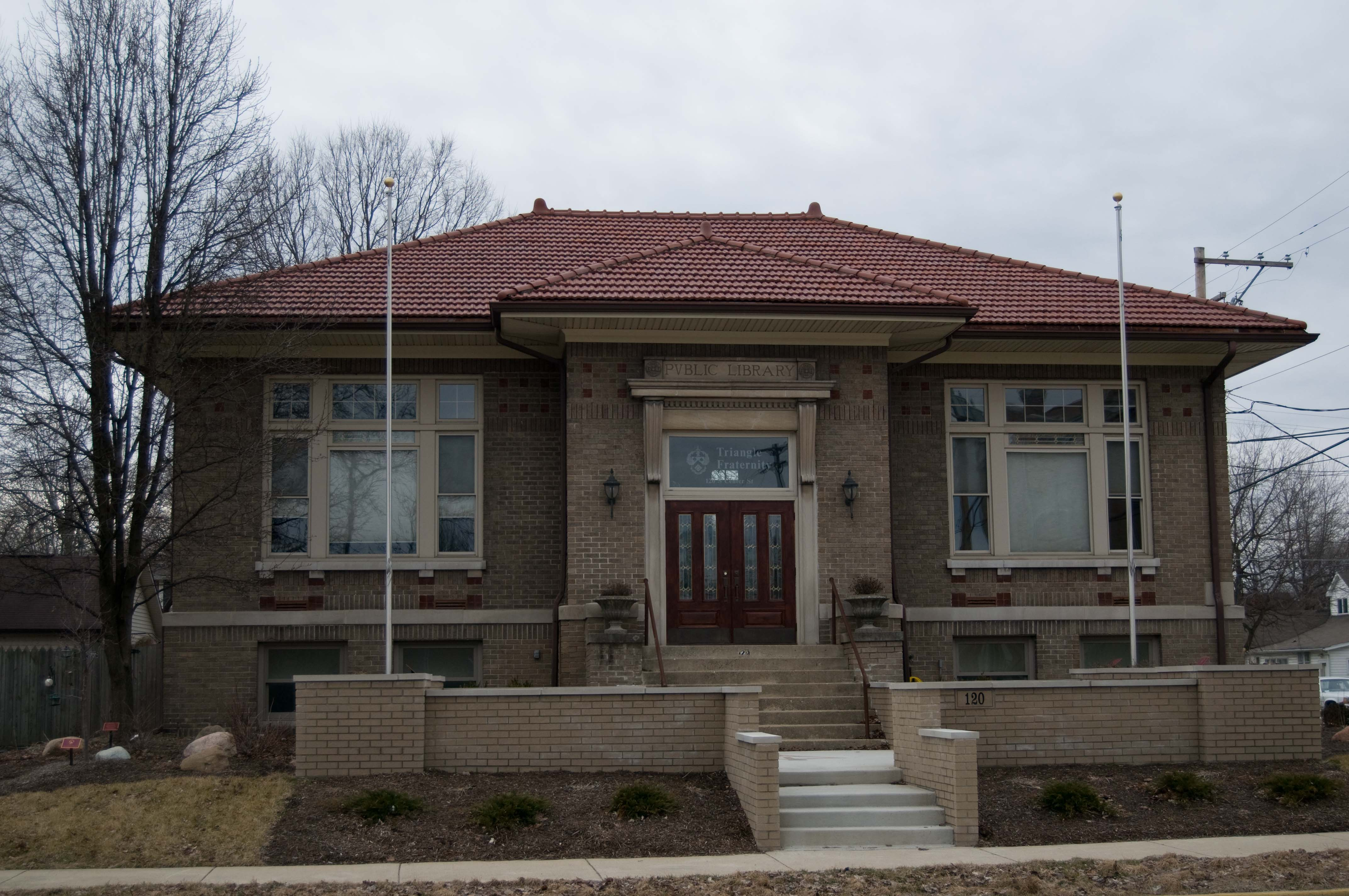
Triangle Fraternity National Headquarters, Plainfield, Indiana, United States

Triangle was formed in the fall of 1906 by sixteen civil engineering juniors at the University of Illinois. It was formally incorporated on 15 April 1907. The date of incorporation has been designated as Founders' Day, and Triangle celebrates it every year at each chapter.

Triangle's mission statement reads, "The purpose of Triangle shall be to maintain a fraternity of engineers, architects and scientists. It shall carry out its purpose by establishing chapters that develop balanced men who cultivate high moral character, foster lifelong friendships, and live their lives with integrity."

== Symbols ==
- Colors: Old Rose and Gray
- Coat of Arms: The crest consists of a rising sun beneath a Triangle T. Beneath is an esquire helmet in profile. At the center of the Coat of Arms is the fraternity's shield and a ribbon containing the organization's motto "Veritas Omnia Vincit" (Truth Conquers All). Surrounding the shield is a mantling.
- Flower: White Chrysanthemum
- Flag: The Coat of Arms on a Yellow T with Gray field.

== Code of Ethics ==
Triangle Fraternity was founded on high ethical and moral ideals, and expects the men of the fraternity to follow a set Code of Ethics, which is as follows:

As a member of Triangle, I recognize my obligation to:

1. Observe the precepts of the Fraternity as set forth in the Ritual;
2. Accept cheerfully my full share of any task, however menial, involved in maintaining a chapter home;
3. Preserve and promote the chosen ideals of my Fraternity;
4. Pay all personal bills promptly, and always live within my means;
5. Help create in my chapter home an environment in which enduring friendships may be formed;
6. Maintain a creditable scholastic record;
7. Promote the welfare of my profession;
8. Maintain my self-respect by proper conduct at all times;
9. Uphold faithfully the traditions and program of my Alma Mater;
10. Pay the price of success in honest effort.

== See also ==
- List of social fraternities
- Professional fraternities and sororities
