= List of Lambda Phi Epsilon chapters =

Lambda Phi Epsilon is a North American Asian-American-Interest fraternity. It has collegiate, graduate, and associate chapters. Associate chapters (colonies) are named for their institutions and are assigned a Greek Letter name once installed or chartered into "full" status as a collegiate chapter.

== Collegiate and associate chapters ==
In the following list, active chapters or associate groups are listed in bold and inactive chapters are in italics.

Chapter	Charter date and range	Institution	Location	Status	Ref.
**Alpha**	February 25, 1981	University of California, Los Angeles	Los Angeles, California	Associate	
**Beta**	September 4, 1985	University of California, Davis	Davis, California	Associate	
**Gamma**	November 21, 1986	University of California, Santa Barbara	Santa Barbara, California	Associate	
**Delta**	August 17, 1988	University of California, Berkeley	Berkeley, California	Associate	
Epsilon	March 9, 1989 – xxxx ?	University of California, Irvine	Irvine, California	Inactive	
**Zeta**	November 11, 1989	University of Texas at Austin	Austin, Texas	Active	
Eta	May 9, 1990 – xxxx ?	University of California, Riverside	Riverside, California	Inactive	
**Theta**	April 12, 1991	Stanford University	Palo Alto, California	Active	
Iota	November 12, 1991 – 20xx ?	University of California, San Diego	San Diego, California	Inactive	
Kappa	January 30, 1992 – March 2016	University of California, Santa Cruz	Santa Cruz, California	Inactive	(Note: Chapter was suspended after several members were arrested for running a drug smuggling ring.)
Lambda				Unassigned	
Mu	November 14, 1990 – 20xx?	California State University, Sacramento	Sacramento, California	Inactive	
**Nu**	March 21, 1989	University at Buffalo	Buffalo, New York	Active	
**Xi**	October 24, 1991	University of Michigan	Ann Arbor, Michigan	Associate	
Omicron	February 9, 1993 – xxxx ?	San Francisco State University	San Francisco, California	Inactive	
Pi	May 14, 1993 – 2023	University of Houston	Houston, Texas	Inactive	
Rho	May 2, 1994 – xxxx ?	San Jose State University	San Jose, California	Inactive	
Sigma	April 20, 1993 – 20xx ?	University of Pennsylvania	Philadelphia, Pennsylvania	Inactive	
Tau	May 10, 1994 – 20xx ?	Pennsylvania State University	State College, Pennsylvania	Inactive	
Upsilon	October 2, 1994 – 2016	Johns Hopkins University	Baltimore, Maryland	Inactive	
Phi	October 6, 1995 – 20xx ?	California Polytechnic State University	San Luis Obispo, California	Inactive	
**Chi**	May 10, 1997	University of Illinois at Urbana–Champaign	Champaign, Illinois	Active	
**Psi**	September 30, 1995	University of Chicago	Chicago, Illinois	Active	
Omega				Memorial	
**Alpha Alpha**	May 12, 1996	Binghamton University	Binghamton, New York	Associate	
Alpha Beta	June 9, 1996 – May 2020	New York University	New York, New York	Inactive	(Note: The university and the national fraternity suspended the chapter for posting racist statements in response to the George Floyd protests.)
**Alpha Gamma**	September 1, 1997	Baylor University	Waco, Texas	Active	
**Alpha Delta**	November 8, 1998	St. John's University	Queens, New York	Active	
**Alpha Epsilon**	November 22, 1998	Stony Brook University	Stony Brook, New York	Associate	
**Alpha Zeta**	February 14, 1999	University of Washington	Seattle, Washington	Associate	
Alpha Eta	May 18, 1997 – xxxx ?	Northwestern University	Evanston, Illinois	Inactive	(Note: Alpha Eta chapter is inactive due to hazing.)
Alpha Theta	April 15, 2001 – 2016	Rutgers University	New Brunswick, New Jersey	Inactive	
Alpha Iota	April 22, 2001 – November 1, 2022	Purdue University	West Lafayette, Indiana	Inactive	(Note: Chapter started as a colony in 2001.) (Note: Chapter was suspended for four years following allegations of hazing, sexual assault and relationship violence, academic dishonesty, and underground functions. Th)
**Alpha Kappa**	November 14, 1999	Cornell University	Ithaca, New York	Active	
Alpha Lambda				Unassigned	
**Alpha Mu**	March 24, 2002	Carnegie Mellon University	Pittsburgh, Pennsylvania	Active	
Alpha Nu	November 14, 2004 – 201x ?	City University of New York, Baruch	Manhattan, New York	Inactive	
**Alpha Xi**	December 5, 2004	University of Toronto	Toronto, Ontario, Canada	Active	
**Alpha Omicron**	November 20, 2005	University of Texas at Dallas	Dallas, Texas	Active	
Alpha Pi	November 2, 1996 – 20xx ?	Boston University	Boston, Massachusetts	Inactive	
**Alpha Rho**	April 17, 1999	Columbia University	New York, New York	Active	
Alpha Sigma	December 8, 2007 – January 26, 2023	Virginia Commonwealth University	Richmond, Virginia	Inactive	(Note: The university suspended the chapter for seven years, until January 1, 2031.)
**Alpha Tau**	March 16, 2002	University of Virginia	Charlottesville, Virginia	Active	
**Alpha Upsilon**	December 7, 2002	University of Massachusetts Amherst	Amherst, Massachusetts	Active	
Alpha Phi	December 2, 2007 - 2024	University of Oklahoma	Norman, Oklahoma	Inactive	
**Alpha Chi**	2010	University of Georgia	Athens, Georgia	Active	(Note: Chapter started as a colony on June 10, 2001.)
**Alpha Psi**	2017	University of Kansas	Lawrence, Kansas	Active	(Note: Chapter started as a colony on May 10, 2003.)
Alpha Omega				Unassigned	
**Beta Alpha**	April 12, 2009	Northeastern University	Boston, Massachusetts	Active	(Note: Chapter started as a colony in 2003.)
**Beta Beta**	April 7, 2013	University of Texas at Arlington	Arlington, Texas	Active	(Note: Chapter started as a colony in 2007.)
**Beta Gamma**	March 28, 2015	Syracuse University	Syracuse, New York	Active	(Note: Chapter started as a colony in 2008.)
**Beta Delta**	2022	Washington State University	Pullman, Washington	Active	(Note: Chapter started as a colony on March 24, 2013.)
**Beta Epsilon**	2022	Rochester Institute of Technology	Rochester, New York	Active	(Note: Chapter formed as a colony on April 7, 2018.)
**Beta Zeta**	2023	Virginia Tech	Blacksburg, Virginia	Active	(Note: Chapter started as a colony on December 21, 2003.)
**Beta Eta**	November 18, 2016	North Carolina State University	Raleigh, North Carolina	Active	(Note: Colony formed on November 18, 2016.)
**Beta Theta**	March 10, 2019	Florida State University	Tallahassee, Florida	Active	(Note: Colony formed on November 6, 2016.)
**Beta Iota**	November 6, 2016	University of Nebraska–Lincoln	Lincoln, Nebraska	Active	(Note: Colony formed on November 6, 2016.)
**Beta Kappa**	April 12, 2020	University of Tennessee	Knoxville, Tennessee	Active	(Note: Colony formed on November 6, 2016.)
**Duke**		Duke University	Durham, North Carolina	Associate	(Note: Colony formed on November 23, 2003.)
**Michigan State**		Michigan State University	East Lansing, Michigan	Associate	(Note: Colony formed on November 24, 2002.)
**McMaster**		McMaster University	Hamilton, Ontario, Canada	Associate	(Note: Colony formed on November 13, 2011.)
UMCP		University of Maryland, College Park	College Park, Maryland	Inactive	(Note: Colony formed on November 13, 2011.)
**James Madison**		James Madison University	Harrisonburg, Virginia	Associate	(Note: Colony formed on April 14, 2012.)
**UNC Chapel Hill**		University of North Carolina at Chapel Hill	Chapel Hill, North Carolina	Associate	(Note: Colony formed on March 31, 2013.)
**DePaul**		DePaul University	Chicago, Illinois	Associate	(Note: Colony formed on May 2, 2015.)
NAU		Northern Arizona University	Flagstaff, Arizona	Inactive	(Note: Colony formed on 2014/04/12.)
**Loyola**		Loyola University Chicago	Chicago, Illinois	Associate	(Note: Colony formed on April 23, 2016.)
**Connecticut**		University of Connecticut	Storrs, Connecticut	Associate	(Note: Chapter formed from April 8, 2017.)
**Florida**		Florida Regional Graduate Chapter	Orlando, Florida	Graduate	(Note: Chapter formed from April 8, 2017.)
**UMBC**		University of Maryland, Baltimore County	Baltimore County, Maryland	Associate	(Note: Colony formed on April 14, 2018.)
**Madison**		University of Wisconsin–Madison	Madison, Wisconsin	Associate	(Note: Chapter formed from April 15, 2018.)
**Albany**		University at Albany, SUNY	Albany, New York	Associate	(Note: Colony formed on April 6, 2019.)
**George Mason**		George Mason University	Fairfax, Virginia	Associate	(Note: Colony formed on December 1, 2019.)
**Ohio State**		Ohio State University	Columbus, Ohio	Associate	(Note: Colony formed on April 2, 2020.)
**Minnesota**		University of Minnesota	Minneapolis, Minnesota	Associate	(Note: Colony formed on October 25, 2020.)
**Central Florida**		University of Central Florida	Orange County, Florida	Associate	(Note: Colony formed on March 28, 2021.)
**Oklahoma State**		Oklahoma State University	Stillwater, Oklahoma	Associate	(Note: Colony formed on April 26, 2021.)
**Villanova University**		Villanova University	Villanova, Pennsylvania	Associate	(Note: Colony formed on April 11, 2023.)
**Indiana**		University of Indiana Bloomington	Bloomington, Indiana	Associate	(Note: Colony formed on October 27, 2023.)
**UNC Charlotte**		University of North Carolina at Charlotte	Charlotte, North Carolina	Associate	(Note: Colony formed on November 4, 2023.)
**Milwaukee**		University of Wisconsin–Milwaukee	Milwaukee, Wisconsin	Associate	(Note: Colony formed on April 18, 2025.)
**Vanderbilt**		Vanderbilt University	Nashville, Tennessee	Associate	(Note: Colony formed on April 22, 2025.)
**South Florida**		University of South Florida	Tampa, Florida	Associate	(Note: Colony formed on April 19, 2026.)
