= Sigma Lambda Alpha =

Sigma Lambda Alpha (ΣΛΑ) may refer to:

- Sigma Lambda Alpha (sorority), an American Latina-based organization for college-educated women
- Sigma Lambda Alpha (honor society), recognizes academic achievement in the field of landscape architecture
