= Kappa Guild =

Charity based in Baltimore, Maryland

Kappa Guild, Inc. is a charity founded in 1955 that raises funds to support children's health and welfare, providing medical equipment and resources to pediatric hospitals and programs across Maryland. It was established by former members of the Kappa Sigma Tau sorority in Baltimore.

== Early years ==
Kappa Guild, Inc., was founded in 1955 in Baltimore, Maryland, by ten former members of the high school sorority Kappa Sigma Tau. Initially established as a social club, Kappa Guild shifted focus to charitable activities. This shift was influenced by founding member Sallie Rifkin, who, while accompanying her young son during his hospital stay for heart surgery, noticed a lack of toys, play spaces, and other amenities for children in hospitals. Rifkin and the other founders directed their efforts toward improving the experience of hospitalized children. The guild's mission became: to support children's health and welfare by providing resources to local pediatric facilities.

At the beginning, Kappa Guild relied on a leadership structure that helped formalize and organize its activities. Rifkin, serving as the first president, played a role in establishing the guild's mission and led its early fundraising efforts, which included events in the community to collect funds for toys and other pediatric resources.

== Growth from 1970s to 1990s ==
On November 15, 1970, Kappa Guild presented an adaptation of Fiddler on the Roof at the Jewish Convalescent Home. Directed by Lynn Rosen, the performance featured counselors-in-training from Camp Wonderland in Randallstown, Maryland, with piano accompaniment by Lee Markowitz. By the late 1970s, Kappa Guild had over 70 active members and was holding annual fundraisers like luncheons, fashion shows, and "nearly new" sales, with all proceeds going to their charitable work for children.

Throughout the 1970s and 1980s, Kappa Guild's charitable projects expanded to support a variety of pediatric and educational facilities. One early initiative was an US$11,500 (equivalent to $65,066 in 2025) pledge to the Maryland School for the Blind. Completed in 1976, the pledge funded an examining room equipped for children with physical and sensory disabilities. Around the same period, the guild funded a room at the Gateway School under the Hearing and Speech Agency of Metropolitan Baltimore, providing equipment to support children with hearing and speech impairments.

In 1980, Miriam Stern joined Kappa Guild and would later become an influential member, serving as vice president by 2021. Stern contributed to organizing social and fundraising events, which included luncheons, bus trips, and annual fashion shows. Her focus on building strong connections within the guild helped maintain member engagement and support over the years. During the 1980s and 1990s, Kappa Guild's contributions grew to include telemetry equipment and biofeedback machines for institutions like the Kennedy Krieger Institute's Seizure Clinic, along with resources for the Maryland Kidney Fund. In 1983, the organization donated an US$18,000 (equivalent to $58,186 in 2025) cineradiographic film processor to the University of Maryland Hospital's pediatric cardiology department.

== Current activities ==
Entering the 2000s, Kappa Guild continued its support of pediatric healthcare and educational institutions in Maryland, broadening its partnerships and funding projects at facilities such as the Mt. Washington Pediatric Hospital, University of Maryland Medical Center's neonatal intensive care unit, and the Herman and Walter Samuelson Children's Hospital at Sinai Hospital. By this period, the organization supported over 25 institutions and programs for children with special needs, chronic illnesses, and trauma, making contributions that included items such as rocking chairs, specialized wheelchairs, and play equipment.

In the early 2020s, Sheila Mentz took on leadership roles within Kappa Guild, serving as president during the COVID-19 pandemic. Mentz adapted the guild's operations to accommodate health and safety restrictions by organizing virtual meetings and continuing fundraising efforts online. Her focus on member communication, including regular updates to maintain morale, allowed the guild to continue its mission despite challenges posed by the pandemic. Under her leadership, Kappa Guild raised over $10,000 during this period, which was used to purchase specialized medical equipment, such as baby scales and therapeutic swings, for children's hospitals and programs.

In June 2023, Kappa Guild celebrated its 70th anniversary, which coincided with the organization's postponed 50th donor event. Originally scheduled for 2020, the donor event was rescheduled due to the pandemic and aligned with the guild's platinum jubilee celebration. Maryland legislators, including state senator Shelly L. Hettleman and delegate Dana Stein, attended the event and presented Kappa Guild with a citation from the Maryland General Assembly in recognition of its longstanding contributions to children's health and welfare in Baltimore. At the celebration, Mentz noted the Guild's resilience, quoting, "We cannot direct the wind but we can adjust the sails."

== See also ==
- History of the Jews in Maryland
