= List of Delta Zeta chapters =

Delta Zeta is an international college sorority. It was established in 1902, at Miami University in Oxford, Ohio. The sorority absorbed Beta Phi Alpha in 1941, Delta Sigma Epsilon in 1956, and Theta Upsilon in 1962. In the following list of its chapters, active chapters are indicated in bold and inactive chapters and institutions are in italics.

Chapter	Charter date and range	Institution	City	State or province	Status	Ref.
**Alpha**	October 24, 1902–1906; 1908	Miami University	Oxford	Ohio	Active	(Note: Absorbed Delta Sigma Epsilon. Later, absorbed the Mu chapter of Theta Upsilon in 1962.)
Beta	1908–1932	Cornell University	Ithaca	New York	Inactive	
Gamma	1923-1965	University of Minnesota	Minneapolis	Minnesota	Inactive	
Delta	1909–1985, 1988–2007	DePauw University	Greencastle	Indiana	Inactive	
**Epsilon**	1909–1941; 1944	Indiana University Bloomington	Bloomington	Indiana	Active	
Zeta	1910–1937, 1966–1971	University of Nebraska	Lincoln	Nebraska	Inactive	
Eta	1910–1912, 1928–1934	Baker University	Baldwin City	Kansas	Inactive	(Note: Chapter formed from Sigma Rho Eta, established in 1910.)
**Theta**	1911	Ohio State University	Columbus	Ohio	Active	(Note: Chapter formed from Beta Gamma, established in 1910.)
**Iota**	1913–1936; 1951–1999; 2002	University of Iowa	Iowa City	Iowa	Active	
**Kappa**	1914–1976; 1983	University of Washington	Seattle	Washington	Active	
Lambda	1915–1935, 1963–1976	Kansas State University	Manhattan	Kansas	Inactive	(Note: After going dormant, the chapter reformed from Clovia, established in 1921.)
Mu	1915–1969	University of California, Berkeley	Berkeley	California	Inactive	(Note: Chapter formed from Enewah, established in 1900. Later, it absorbed Beta Phi Alpha, Phi Omega Pi, Theta Upsilon, and Delta Sigma Epsilon.)
Nu	1915–1964	Knox College	Galesburg	Illinois	Inactive	(Note: Chapter formed from Lambda Sigma Alpha, established in 1915.)
Xi	1916–1977	University of Cincinnati	Cincinnati	Ohio	Inactive	
**Omicron**	1916	University of Pittsburgh	Pittsburgh	Pennsylvania	Active	(Note: Chapter formed from Sigma Sigma Gamma, established in 1914. Later, it absorbed Beta Phi Alpha.)
**Pi**	1917–1966; 1987	Eureka College	Eureka	Illinois	Active	(Note: Chapter formed from Kappa Delta Pi, established in 1914.)
**Rho**	1917–1951; 1982	University of Denver	Denver	Colorado	Active	(Note: Chapter formed from Delta Omega, established in 1915. After going dormant, it reformed by absorbing Upsilon Sigma, established in 1982.)
**Sigma**	1917	Louisiana State University	Baton Rouge	Louisiana	Active	(Note: Chapter formed from Alpha Alpha Zeta, established in 1916.)
Tau	1918–1941, 1946–1971	University of Wisconsin–Madison	Madison	Wisconsin	Inactive	(Note: After going dormant, the chapter reformed from Phi Omega Pi, established in 1915.)
Upsilon	1919–1983	University of North Dakota	Grand Forks	North Dakota	Inactive	(Note: Chapter formed from Alpha Sigma Epsilon, established in 1916.)
Phi	1919–1958	Washington State University	Pullman	Washington	Inactive	(Note: Chapter formed from Delta Phi Phi, established in 1917.)
Chi	1919–1977	Oregon State University	Corvallis	Oregon	Inactive	(Note: Chapter formed from Zeta Chi, established in 1918. Later, it absorbed Beta Phi Alpha.)
Psi	1920–1990	Franklin College	Franklin	Indiana	Inactive	(Note: Chapter formed from Iota Psi Ny, established in 1913.)
Omega	1920–1935, 1945–1969, 1986–1993, 2018–2022	University of Oregon	Eugene	Oregon	Inactive	(Note: Chapter formed from Delta Psi (local), established in 1919.)
Alpha Alpha	1920–2021	Northwestern University	Evanston	Illinois	Inactive	
**Alpha Beta**	October 21, 1921	University of Illinois Urbana-Champaign	Champaign	Illinois	Active	(Note: Chapter formed from Kappa Pi, established in 1919. It absorbed the Gamma chapter of Theta Upsilon in 1962.)
**Alpha Gamma**	1922	University of Alabama	Tuscaloosa	Alabama	Active	(Note: Chapter formed from Delta Sigma, established in 1920.)
Alpha Delta	1922–1968	George Washington University	Washington, D.C.	District of Columbia	Inactive	
Alpha Epsilon	1922–1932, 1941–1994	Oklahoma State University–Stillwater	Stillwater	Oklahoma	Inactive	(Note: Chapter formed by Alpha Kappa, established in 1917.)
Alpha Zeta	1922–1978	Adelphi University	Garden City	New York	Inactive	(Note: Chapter formed from Alpha Delta Alpha, established in 1921. Later, it absorbed Beta Phi Alpha.)
Alpha Eta	1923–1936, 1948–1953, 1990–199x	University of Michigan	Ann Arbor	Michigan	Inactive	(Note: Chapter formed from Alpha Delta Zeta, established in 1921. After going dormant, the chapter was reformed in 1990 from Pi Delta, established in 1986.)
**Alpha Theta**	1923–1942; 1945	University of Kentucky	Lexington	Kentucky	Active	(Note: Chapter formed from Lambda Phi, established in 1922.)
Alpha Iota	1923–1954	University of Southern California	Los Angeles	California	Inactive	(Note: Chapter formed from Lambda Rho, established in 1919.)
Alpha Kappa	1924–1936, 1941–1957	Syracuse University	Syracuse	New York	Inactive	(Note: Chapter formed from Lambda Delta Sigma, established in 1923. After dormancy, it reformed from Beta Phi Alpha, established in 1925.)
Alpha Lambda	1924–1934	University of Colorado Boulder	Boulder	Colorado	Inactive	(Note: Chapter formed from Pi Delta, established in 1923.)
Alpha Mu	1924–1930	St. Lawrence University	Canton	New York	Inactive	(Note: Chapter formed from Lambda Sigma (local), established in 1922.)
Alpha Nu	1924–1935	Butler University	Indianapolis	Indiana	Inactive	(Note: Chapter formed from Tau Gamma Tau (local), established in 1923.)
Alpha Xi	1924–1938	Randolph College	Lynchburg	Virginia	Inactive	
Alpha Omicron	1924–1949, 1962–1978	Brenau College	Gainesville	Georgia	Inactive	(Note: Chapter formed from Beta Tau, established in 1923.)
Alpha Pi	1924–2004	Samford University	Homewood	Alabama	Inactive	(Note: Chapter formed from Zeta Omega, established in 1916.)
**Alpha Rho**	1924–1936; 1989	Ohio Wesleyan University	Delaware	Ohio	Active	(Note: Chapter formed from Kappa Gamma Delta, established in 1923.)
**Alpha Sigma**	1924	Florida State University	Tallahassee	Florida	Active	(Note: Chapter formed from Alpha Nu, established in 1923.)
Alpha Tau	1924–1931, 1939–1977	University of Texas Austin	Austin	Texas	Inactive	
**Alpha Upsilon**	1924–1935; 1947	University of Maine	Orono	Maine	Active	(Note: Chapter formed from Kappa Nu Alpha, established in 1924.)
Alpha Phi	1925–1936	University of Kansas	Lawrence	Kansas	Inactive	(Note: Chapter formed from Zeta Xi, established in 1924.)
Alpha Chi	1925–1979, 1983–1995	University of California, Los Angeles	Los Angeles	California	Inactive	(Note: Chapter formed from Pi Epsilon Alpha, established in 1922. Later, it absorbed Beta Phi Alpha and Phi Omega Pi.)
Alpha Psi	1926–1970	Southern Methodist University	Dallas	Texas	Inactive	(Note: Chapter formed from Kappa Phi, established in 1924.)
Alpha Omega	1926–1936	Millsaps College	Jackson	Mississippi	Inactive	(Note: Chapter formed from Beta Tau, established in 1924.)
**Beta Alpha**	1928	University of Rhode Island	Kingston	Rhode Island	Active	(Note: Chapter formed from Theta Delta Omicron, established in 1924.)
Beta Beta	1928–1932, 1936–1953	University of Mississippi	Oxford	Mississippi	Inactive	(Note: Chapter formed from Tau Delta, established in 1926.)
**Beta Gamma**	1928	University of Louisville	Louisville	Kentucky	Active	(Note: Chapter formed from Theta Sigma Sigma, established in 1925.)
**Beta Delta**	1928	University of South Carolina	Columbia	South Carolina	Active	(Note: Chapter formed from Alpha Gamma, established in 1926.)
Beta Epsilon	1928–1934	University of Pennsylvania	Philadelphia	Pennsylvania	Inactive	(Note: Chapter formed from Phi Lambda, established in 1927.)
Beta Zeta	1928–1940	University of Utah	Salt Lake City	Utah	Inactive	(Note: Chapter formed from Zeta Tau, established in 1925.)
Beta Eta	1930–1940	Swarthmore College	Swarthmore	Pennsylvania	Inactive	(Note: Chapter formed from Alpha Delta Tau, established in 1926.)
Beta Theta	1930–1978, 2017–2021	Bucknell University	Lewisburg	Pennsylvania	Inactive	(Note: Chapter formed from Zeta Gamma Tau, established in 1924.)
Beta Iota	1930–1935, 1996–1978	University of Arizona	Tucson	Arizona	Inactive	(Note: Chapter formed from Iota Lambda Rho, established in 1927.)
**Beta Kappa**	1931	Iowa State University	Ames	Iowa	Active	(Note: Chapter formed from Sigma Delta, established in 1923.)
**Beta Lambda**	1933–1982; 1985	University of Tennessee	Knoxville	Tennessee	Active	(Note: Chapter formed from Alpha Theta, established in 1924.)
Beta Mu	1937–1979	Florida Southern College	Lakeland	Florida	Inactive	(Note: Chapter formed from Chi Delta Nu, established in 1929.)
Beta Nu	1939–1976	University of Miami	Coral Gables	Florida	Inactive	(Note: Chapter formed from Alpha Omega, established in 1938. Later, it absorbed Beta Phi Alpha.)
**Beta Xi**	1940	Auburn University	Auburn	Alabama	Active	(Note: Chapter formed from Zeta Delta, established in 1939.)
Beta Omicron	1940–1943	University of Arkansas	Fayetteville	Arkansas	Inactive	(Note: Chapter formed from Theta Gamma Phi, established in 1938.)
Beta Pi	1940–1970	Albion College	Albion	Michigan	Inactive	
Beta Rho	1941–1979	Michigan State University	East Lansing	Michigan	Inactive	(Note: Chapter formed from Beta Rho, established in 1941.)
Beta Sigma	1941–1978	Colorado State University	Fort Collins	Colorado	Inactive	(Note: Chapter formed from Beta Phi Alpha, established in 1923.)
**Beta Tau**	1941	Nebraska Wesleyan University	Lincoln	Nebraska	Active	(Note: Chapter formed from Beta Phi Alpha, established in 1927.)
Beta Upsilon	1941–1961	Tulane University	New Orleans	Louisiana	Inactive	(Note: Chapter formed from Beta Phi Alpha, established in 1928.)
Beta Phi	1941–1943, 1980–1986	Oglethorpe University	Brookhaven	Georgia	Inactive	(Note: Chapter formed from Beta Phi Alpha, established in 1930. After going dormant, it reformed from Gamma Delta Epsilon, established in 1977)
Beta Chi	1941–1995	Wittenberg University	Springfield	Ohio	Inactive	(Note: Chapter formed from Beta Phi Alpha, established in 1931.)
Beta Psi	1941–1953	College of Charleston	Charleston	South Carolina	Inactive	(Note: Chapter formed from Beta Phi Alpha, established in 1934.)
Beta Omega	1941–1969	New York University	New York City	New York	Inactive	(Note: Chapter formed from Beta Phi Alpha, established in 1935.)
**Gamma Alpha**	1941	Baldwin Wallace University	Berea	Ohio	Active	(Note: Chapter formed from Phi Lambda Chi, established in 1936.)
**Gamma Beta**	1943–1972, 1980–2014, 2017	University of Connecticut	Storrs	Connecticut	Active	
Gamma Gamma	1945–1980	Missouri Valley College	Marshall	Missouri	Inactive	(Note: Chapter formed from Sigma Phi, established in 1930)
**Gamma Delta**	1946–1977, 1989	Pennsylvania State University	University Park	Pennsylvania	Active	(Note: Chapter formed from Lampades, established in 1945.)
Gamma Epsilon	1946–1979	Drake University	Des Moines	Iowa	Inactive	
Gamma Zeta	1946–1990	Southwestern University	Georgetown	Texas	Inactive	(Note: Chapter formed from Lambda Sigma Gamma, established in 1945.)
Gamma Eta	1946–1971	Hunter College	Manhattan, New York City	New York	Inactive	(Note: Chapter formed from Phi Omega Pi, established in 1921.)
Gamma Theta	1947–2008	Carroll University	Waukesha	Wisconsin	Inactive	(Note: Chapter formed from Theta Pi Delta, established in 1918.)
Gamma Iota	1948–1994	University of Memphis	Memphis	Tennessee	Inactive	
**Gamma Kappa**	1948	Kent State University	Kent	Ohio	Active	(Note: Chapter formed from Gamma Iota, established in 1947.)
**Gamma Lambda**	1948–1971; 1979	San Jose State University	San Jose	California	Active	
Gamma Mu	1948–1969	Illinois Institute of Technology	Chicago	Illinois	Inactive	(Note: Chapter formed from Sigma Omicron Lambda, established in 1923.)
**Gamma Nu**	1949	Eastern Illinois University	Charleston	Illinois	Active	(Note: Chapter formed from Phi Beta, established in 1947. Later, it absorbed Delta Sigma Epsilon.)
**Gamma Xi**	1949	New Mexico State University	Las Cruces	New Mexico	Active	
Gamma Omicron	1949–1973, 1989–1995, 2008–2022	San Diego State University	San Diego	California	Inactive	(Note: Chapter formed from Alpha Sigma Chi (local), established in 1930.)
**Gamma Pi**	1950	Western Michigan University	Kalamazoo	Michigan	Active	
**Gamma Rho**	1950	Northern Illinois University	DeKalb	Illinois	Active	(Note: Chapter absorbed Delta Sigma Epsilon.)
**Gamma Sigma**	1955–1974; 1989	Eastern Michigan University	Ypsilanti	Michigan	Active	(Note: Chapter formed from Kappa Mu Delta, established in 1914. Later, absorbed Delta Sigma Epsilon. After going dormant, it reformed from Zeta Tau Omega (local), established in 1986.)
**Gamma Tau**	1950–1999; 2001	Bowling Green State University	Bowling Green	Ohio	Active	(Note: Chapter formed from Sigma Rho Tau, established in 1946.)
Gamma Upsilon	1951–1987	Oklahoma City University	Oklahoma City	Oklahoma	Inactive	(Note: Chapter formed from Alpha Omega, established in 1923.)
**Gamma Phi**	1952	Indiana University of Pennsylvania	Indiana	Pennsylvania	Active	(Note: Chapter formed from Beta Sigma Chi, established in 1951. Later, it absorbed Delta Sigma Epsilon.)
**Gamma Chi**	1953	Ball State University	Muncie	Indiana	Active	(Note: Chapter formed from Omega Sigma Kappa, established in 1923. Later, it absorbed Delta Sigma Epsilon.)
**Gamma Psi**	1953	Central Michigan University	Mount Pleasant	Michigan	Active	(Note: Chapter formed from Sigma Phi Omicron, established in 1940. Later, it absorbed Delta Sigma Epsilon.)
**Gamma Omega**	1953	Southern Illinois University Carbondale	Carbondale	Illinois	Active	(Note: Chapter formed from Alpha Eta, established in 1952. Later, it absorbed Delta Sigma Epsilon.)
**Delta Alpha**	1954	California State University, Long Beach	Long Beach	California	Active	(Note: Chapter formed from Omega Phi Delta, established in 1950.)
**Delta Beta**	1954–1964; 1981	University of Tampa	Tampa	Florida	Active	(Note: Chapter formed from Alpha Gamma, established in 1936.)
Delta Gamma	1954–1962	Transylvania University	Lexington	Kentucky	Inactive	(Note: Chapter formed from Lambda Omega, established in 1920.)
**Delta Delta**	1955	Georgia State University	Atlanta	Georgia	Active	(Note: Chapter formed from Chi Rho Sigma, established in the 1930s.)
Delta Epsilon	1955–1971	Queens College, City University of New York	Flushing	New York	Inactive	(Note: Chapter formed from Theta Nu, established in 1937.)
Delta Zeta					Unassigned	
Delta Eta	1956–1986	East Tennessee State University	Johnson City	Tennessee	Inactive	(Note: Chapter formed from Delta Pi Delta, established in 1950.)
**Delta Theta**	1956	University of Houston	Houston	Texas	Active	(Note: Chapter formed from Phi Delta Zeta, established in 1950.)
Delta Iota	1956–1970	Tufts University	Medford and Somerville	Massachusetts	Inactive	
Delta Kappa	1956–1977	University of Louisiana, Lafayette	Lafayette	Louisiana	Inactive	(Note: Chapter formed from Nu Sigma Kappa, established in 191x ?)
Delta Lambda	1957–1985	Lamar University	Beaumont	Texas	Inactive	(Note: Chapter formed from Lambda Tau Zeta, established in 1954.)
Delta Mu	1957-1979	Morningside College	Sioux City	Iowa	Inactive	(Note: Chapter formed from Kappa Zeta Chi, established in 1933.)
Delta Nu	1957–1971	Parsons College	Fairfield	Iowa	Inactive	(Note: Chapter formed from Empyrean, established in 1903.)
**Delta Xi**	1956	University of Northern Colorado	Greeley	Colorado	Active	(Note: Chapter formed from Delta Sigma Epsilon, established in 1916.)
**Delta Omicron**	1956–1988; 2003	Northwestern Oklahoma State University	Alva	Oklahoma	Active	(Note: Chapter formed from Delta Sigma Epsilon, established in 1916. After going dormant, it reformed from Delta Zeta Delta (local), established in 2001)
Delta Pi	1956–1982	Emporia State University	Emporia	Kansas	Inactive	(Note: Chapter formed from Delta Sigma Epsilon, established in 1917.)
Delta Rho	1956–1978	New Mexico Highlands University	Las Vegas	New Mexico	Inactive	(Note: Chapter formed from Delta Sigma Epsilon, established in 1918.)
**Delta Sigma**	1956	Truman State University	Kirksville	Missouri	Active	(Note: Chapter formed from Delta Sigma Epsilon, established in 1921.)
**Delta Tau**	1956–1968; 1987	Temple University	Philadelphia	Pennsylvania	Active	(Note: Chapter formed from Delta Sigma Epsilon, established in 1921. It absorbed the Delta Alpha chapter of Theta Upsilon in 1962. After going dormant, it reformed from Nu Zeta, established in 1985.)
**Delta Upsilon**	1956	Marshall University	Huntington	West Virginia	Active	(Note: Chapter formed from Delta Sigma Epsilon, established in 1922.)
**Delta Phi**	1956	Northeastern State University	Tahlequah	Oklahoma	Active	(Note: Chapter formed from Delta Sigma Epsilon, established in 1923.)
Delta Chi	1956–19xx ?	California State University, Chico	Chico	California	Inactive	(Note: Chapter formed from Delta Sigma Epsilon, established in 1924.)
Delta Psi	1956–1967	University of California, Santa Barbara	Santa Barbara	California	Inactive	(Note: Chapter formed from Delta Sigma Epsilon, established in 1925.)
**Delta Omega**	1956	Fort Hays State University	Hays	Kansas	Active	(Note: Chapter formed from Delta Sigma Epsilon, established in 1925.)
Epsilon Alpha	1956–1970, 199x ?–1999	Western Colorado University	Gunnison	Colorado	Inactive	(Note: Chapter formed from Delta Sigma Epsilon, established in 1925.)
Epsilon Beta	1956–1985	Northwestern State University	Natchitoches	Louisiana	Inactive	(Note: Chapter formed from Delta Sigma Epsilon, established in 1926.)
**Epsilon Gamma**	1956	University of Central Missouri	Warrensburg	Missouri	Active	(Note: Chapter formed from Delta Sigma Epsilon, established in 1927.)
**Epsilon Delta**	1956	Concord University	Athens	West Virginia	Active	(Note: Chapter formed from Delta Sigma Epsilon, established in 1928.)
**Epsilon Epsilon**	1956–1975; 1981	California State University, Fresno	Fresno	California	Active	(Note: Chapter formed from Delta Sigma Epsilon, established in 1928.)
**Epsilon Zeta**	1956	Drexel University	Philadelphia	Pennsylvania	Active	(Note: Chapter formed from Delta Sigma Epsilon, established in 1928.)
Epsilon Eta	1956–1975	Harris–Stowe State University	St. Louis	Missouri	Inactive	(Note: Chapter formed from Delta Sigma Epsilon, established in 1928.)
**Epsilon Theta**	1956	PennWest Clarion	Clarion	Pennsylvania	Active	(Note: Chapter formed from Delta Sigma Epsilon, established in 1932.)
**Epsilon Iota**	1956	Fairmont State University	Fairmont	West Virginia	Active	(Note: Chapter formed from Delta Sigma Epsilon, established in 1934.)
**Epsilon Kappa**	1956	University of Wisconsin–Whitewater	Whitewater	Wisconsin	Active	(Note: Chapter formed from Delta Sigma Epsilon, established in 1936.)
Epsilon Lambda	1956–1968	Southwestern Oklahoma State University	Weatherford	Oklahoma	Inactive	(Note: Chapter formed from Delta Sigma Epsilon, established in 1939.)
Epsilon Mu	1956–19xx ?, 1984–1996	University of Southern Mississippi	Hattiesburg	Mississippi	Inactive	(Note: Chapter formed from Delta Sigma Epsilon, established in 1940.)
**Epsilon Nu**	1956–1968; 1990	Missouri State University	Springfield	Missouri	Active	(Note: Chapter formed from Delta Sigma Epsilon, established in 1941.)
**Epsilon Xi**	1956	University of Central Arkansas	Conway	Arkansas	Active	(Note: Chapter formed from Delta Sigma Epsilon, established in 1944.)
**Epsilon Omicron**	1956	Western Illinois University	Macomb	Illinois	Active	(Note: Chapter formed from Delta Sigma Epsilon, established in 1946.)
Epsilon Pi	1956–2003	Henderson State University	Arkadelphia	Arkansas	Inactive	(Note: Chapter formed from Delta Sigma Epsilon, established in 1946.)
Epsilon Rho	1956–2009	Northwest Missouri State University	Maryville	Missouri	Inactive	(Note: Chapter formed from Delta Sigma Epsilon, established in 1947.)
**Epsilon Sigma**	1956	Wayne State University	Detroit	Michigan	Active	(Note: Chapter formed from Delta Sigma Epsilon, established in 1947.)
Epsilon Tau	1956–2017	Longwood University	Farmville	Virginia	Inactive	(Note: Chapter formed from Delta Sigma Epsilon, established in 1949.)
**Epsilon Upsilon**	1956	University of Central Oklahoma	Edmond	Oklahoma	Active	(Note: Chapter formed from Delta Sigma Epsilon, established in 1950.)
Epsilon Phi	1956–1973	University of Detroit Mercy	Detroit	Michigan	Inactive	(Note: Chapter formed from Delta Sigma Epsilon, established in 1952.)
Epsilon Chi	1958–1978	University of Wisconsin–Milwaukee	Milwaukee	Wisconsin	Inactive	(Note: Chapter formed from Sigma Omicron Delta, established in 1923.)
Epsilon Psi	1956–1971	Saint Louis University	St. Louis	Missouri	Inactive	(Note: Chapter formed from Delta Sigma Epsilon, established in 1956.)
Epsilon Omega	1956–2023	University of Wisconsin–Eau Claire	Eau Claire	Wisconsin	Inactive	(Note: Chapter formed from Delta Sigma Epsilon, established in 1956.)
Zeta Alpha	1957–1987	Bradley University	Peoria	Illinois	Inactive	(Note: Chapter formed from Delta Chi Delta, established in 1950.)
**Zeta Beta**	1957	University of Wisconsin–Stout	Menomonie	Wisconsin	Active	(Note: Chapter formed from Eta Sigma Omega, established in 1923.)
Zeta Gamma	1958–1965	McNeese State University	Lake Charles	Louisiana	Inactive	
Zeta Delta	1958–1967	Wagner College	Staten Island	New York	Inactive	(Note: Chapter formed from Delta Lambda, established in 1952.)
**Zeta Epsilon**	1958	PennWest California	California	Pennsylvania	Active	(Note: Chapter formed from Delta Sigma Epsilon, established in 1956.)
**Zeta Zeta**	1958	West Texas A&M University	Canyon	Texas	Active	(Note: Chapter formed from Delta Zeta Chi, established in 1936.)
Zeta Eta	1958–1974	Southeastern Oklahoma State University	Durant	Oklahoma	Inactive	
Zeta Theta	1959–1989	Sam Houston State University	Huntsville	Texas	Inactive	(Note: Chapter formed from the Anne Gibbs Society, established in 1925.)
Zeta Iota	1959–1971	Humboldt State University	Arcata	California	Inactive	
**Zeta Kappa**	1959	Ohio Northern University	Ada	Ohio	Active	(Note: Chapter formed from Phi Chi, established in 1909.)
**Zeta Lambda**	1960	East Carolina University	Greenville	North Carolina	Active	(Note: Chapter formed from Lambda Tau, established in 1959.)
Zeta Mu	1961–1965	Portland State University	Portland	Oregon	Inactive	
**Zeta Nu**	1961	Ferris State University	Big Rapids	Michigan	Active	(Note: Chapter formed from Sigma Kappa Sigma, established in 1955.)
**Zeta Xi**	1961	Lenoir–Rhyne University	Hickory	North Carolina	Active	(Note: Chapter formed from Sphinx, established in 1944.)
Zeta Omicron	1961–1986	University of Wisconsin–La Crosse	La Crosse	Wisconsin	Inactive	(Note: Chapter formed from Lambda Sigma Chi, established in 1935.)
**Zeta Pi**	1961–197x ?; 1987	University of Georgia	Athens	Georgia	Active	
**Zeta Rho**	1961	William Jewell College	Liberty	Missouri	Active	
Zeta Sigma	1962–1967	University of Nebraska at Kearney	Kearney	Nebraska	Inactive	
Zeta Tau	1962–1985	University of Charleston	Charleston	West Virginia	Inactive	(Note: Chapter formed from Alpha Mu, established in 1925.)
Zeta Upsilon	1962–1983	Winona State University	Winona	Minnesota	Inactive	(Note: Chapter formed from the Coeds, established in 1961.)
**Zeta Phi**	1963	Slippery Rock University	Slippery Rock	Pennsylvania	Active	(Note: Chapter formed from Sigma Lambda Chi, established in 1960.)
Zeta Chi	1963–1983	University of Wisconsin–Stevens Point	Stevens Point	Wisconsin	Inactive	(Note: Chapter formed from Tau Gamma Beta, established in 1909)
**Zeta Psi**	1963	Stephen F. Austin State University	Nacogdoches	Texas	Active	(Note: Chapter formed from Sigma Gamma, established in 1949.)
Zeta Omega	1963–1982	Northern Michigan University	Marquette	Michigan	Inactive	(Note: Chapter formed from Beta Omega Tau, established in 1923.)
Theta Alpha	1962–1977	Simpson College	Indianola	Iowa	Inactive	(Note: Chapter formed from Theta Upsilon, established in 1924.)
Theta Beta	1962–1974	Birmingham-Southern College	Birmingham	Alabama	Inactive	(Note: Chapter formed from Theta Upsilon, established in 1926.)
Theta Gamma	1962–1991	University of New Hampshire	Durham	New Hampshire	Inactive	(Note: Chapter formed from Theta Upsilon, established in 1930.)
Theta Delta	1962–1980	Westminster College	New Wilmington	Pennsylvania	Inactive	(Note: Chapter formed from Theta Upsilon, established in 1931.)
Theta Epsilon	1962–1976, 1979–1991	Louisiana Tech University	Ruston	Louisiana	Inactive	(Note: Chapter formed from Theta Upsilon, established in 1932.)
**Theta Zeta**	1962–1980; 2017	University of Akron	Akron	Ohio	Active	(Note: Chapter formed from the Kappa Alpha chapter of Theta Upsilon, established in 1939.)
**Theta Eta**	1962	Creighton University	Omaha	Nebraska	Active	(Note: Chapter formed from the Mu Alpha chapter of Theta Upsilon, established in 1954.)
**Theta Theta**	1962	DePaul University	Chicago	Illinois	Active	(Note: Chapter formed from the Xi Alpha chapter of Theta Upsilon, established in 1958.)
**Theta Iota**	1962	Western Carolina University	Cullowhee	North Carolina	Active	(Note: Chapter formed from the Omicron Alpha chapter of Theta Upsilon, established in 1960.)
**Theta Kappa**	1963	University of New Orleans	New Orleans	Louisiana	Active	
Theta Lambda	1963–1970	St. Norbert College	De Pere	Wisconsin	Inactive	(Note: Chapter formed from Lambda Sigma Nu, established in 1954.)
**Theta Mu**	1966	St. Cloud State University	St. Cloud	Minnesota	Active	
**Theta Nu**	1963	Minnesota State University Moorhead	Moorhead	Minnesota	Active	(Note: Chapter formed from Gamma Nu, established in 1909.)
Theta Xi	1963–1999	Glenville State University	Glenville	West Virginia	Inactive	(Note: Chapter formed from Beta Tau, established in 1951.)
**Theta Omicron**	1966	University of Texas Rio Grande Valley	Edinburg	Texas	Active	
Theta Pi	1967–1985	Minot State College	Minot	North Dakota	Inactive	
**Theta Rho**	1986	California State University, Los Angeles	Los Angeles	California	Active	
Theta Sigma	1965–1983	Franciscan University of Steubenville	Steubenville	Ohio	Inactive	(Note: Chapter formed from Chi Sigma, established in 1962.)
Theta Tau	1965–1993	University of Findlay	Findlay	Ohio	Inactive	(Note: Chapter formed from Sigma Tau Alpha, established in 1960.)
Theta Upsilon					Inactive	
**Theta Phi**	1966	Old Dominion University	Norfolk	Virginia	Active	(Note: Chapter formed from Virginia Epsylon, established in 1965.)
Theta Chi	1963–1976	Lock Haven University of Pennsylvania	Lock Haven	Pennsylvania	Inactive	
**Theta Psi**	1965	Ashland University	Ashland	Ohio	Active	(Note: Chapter formed from Delta Zeta Chi, established in 1964.)
**Theta Omega**	1965	Barton College	Wilson	North Carolina	Active	(Note: Chapter formed from Omega Chi, established in 1956.)
**Iota Alpha**	1964	Texas State University	San Marcos	Texas	Active	(Note: Chapter formed from Alpha Delta Chi, established in 1926.)
Iota Beta	1966–1981	Dickinson State College	Dickinson	North Dakota	Inactive	(Note: Chapter formed from Kappa Tau, established in 1964.)
Iota Gamma	1966–1979	Alliance College	Cambridge Springs	Pennsylvania	Inactive	(Note: Chapter formed from Omicron Omicron Delta, established in 1963.)
**Iota Delta**	1965	PennWest Edinboro	Edinboro	Pennsylvania	Active	(Note: Chapter formed from Alpha Delta, established in 1927.)
Iota Epsilon	1966–1972	University of Wisconsin–Oshkosh	Oshkosh	Wisconsin	Inactive	
Iota Zeta	1966–1978	Saint John's University	Queens	New York	Inactive	(Note: Chapter formed from Sigma Alpha Sigma, established in 1961.)
Iota Eta					Unassigned	
**Iota Theta**	1966	Mansfield University of Pennsylvania	Mansfield	Pennsylvania	Active	
Iota Iota	1967–2006	Middle Tennessee State University	Murfreesboro	Tennessee	Inactive	(Note: Chapter formed from Delta Phi Gamma, established in 1966.)
Iota Kappa	March 11, 1967–1989	Rider University	Lawrence Township	New Jersey	Inactive	(Note: Chapter formed from Zeta Mu Epsilon, established in 1939.)
Iota Lambda	1967–1976	University of South Florida	Tampa	Florida	Inactive	
Iota Mu	1967–1971	Monmouth University	West Long Branch	New Jersey	Inactive	(Note: Chapter formed from Tau Lambda Chi, established in 1956.)
Iota Nu	1968–1987	Georgia Southern University	Statesboro	Georgia	Inactive	
**Iota Xi**	1968	University of Missouri–St. Louis	St. Louis	Missouri	Active	(Note: Chapter formed from Delta Theta Kappa, established in 1965.)
Iota Omicron	1969–1970	Niagara University	Lewiston	New York	Inactive	
Iota Pi	1967–1976, 1982–2007	West Virginia Institute of Technology	Beckley	West Virginia	Inactive	(Note: Chapter formed from Delta Theta Pi, established in 1927.)
**Iota Rho**	1969	West Chester University	West Chester	Pennsylvania	Active	(Note: Chapter formed from Eta Iota Rho, established in 1968.)
Iota Sigma	1967–1971	Philadelphia University	Philadelphia	Pennsylvania	Inactive	(Note: Chapter formed from Kappa Sigma Phi, established in 1943.)
Iota Tau	1966–1993	West Liberty University	West Liberty	West Virginia	Inactive	(Note: Chapter formed from Delta Tau Gamma, established in 1930.)
**Iota Upsilon**	1968	California State University, Fullerton	Fullerton	California	Active	
Iota Phi	1968–2017	University of Nevada, Las Vegas	Paradise	Nevada	Inactive	(Note: Chapter formed from Delta Phi Delta, established in 1966.)
Iota Chi	1968–1989	Northland College	Ashland	Wisconsin	Inactive	(Note: Chapter formed from Alpha Sigma (local), established in 1918.)
**Iota Psi**	1967–2015, 2017	University of Texas at Arlington	Arlington	Texas	Active	(Note: Chapter formed from Zongola, established in 1933.)
Iota Omega	1968–1986	Jacksonville University	Jacksonville	Florida	Inactive	(Note: Chapter formed from Omega Tau Alpha, established in 1956.)
**Kappa Alpha**	1968	Nicholls State University	Thibodaux	Louisiana	Active	
**Kappa Beta**	1972	Northern Kentucky University	Highland Heights	Kentucky	Active	
Kappa Gamma					Unassigned	
Kappa Delta					Unassigned	
**Kappa Epsilon**	1972	Plymouth State University	Plymouth	New Hampshire	Active	(Note: Chapter formed from Sigma Delta Chi, established in 1966.)
Kappa Zeta	1968–2000	University of North Texas	Texas	Texas	Inactive	
Kappa Eta					Inactive	
Kappa Theta	1971–2010	Virginia Tech	Blacksburg	Virginia	Inactive	
**Kappa Iota**	1972	Wright State University	Fairborn	Ohio	Active	
Kappa Kappa					Inactive	
Kappa Lambda	1970–1983	University of West Alabama	Livingston	Alabama	Inactive	(Note: Chapter formed from Phi Delta Mu, established in 1940.)
**Kappa Mu**	1973	Shepherd University	Shepherdstown	West Virginia	Active	(Note: Chapter formed from Theta Kappa Psi, established in 1970.)
**Kappa Nu**	1971–1980	Missouri Western State University	St. Joseph	Missouri	Inactive	(Note: Chapter formed from Chi Chi Chi, established in 1968.)
**Kappa Xi**	1969–1978; 1988	Duquesne University	Pittsburgh	Pennsylvania	Active	(Note: After going dormant, the chapter reformed from Delta Zeta Phi, established in 1986.)
Kappa Omicron	1972–1973	Elon University	Elon	North Carolina	Inactive	(Note: Chapter formed from Zeta Tau, established in 1971. It later absorbed Beta Omicron Beta.)
Kappa Pi	1972–1974	Keene State College	Keene	New Hampshire	Inactive	
**Kappa Rho**	1972	Kutztown University of Pennsylvania	Kutztown	Pennsylvania	Active	
Kappa Sigma					Unassigned	
**Kappa Tau**	1970	Morehead State University	Morehead	Kentucky	Active	(Note: Chapter formed from Lambda Kappa Tau, established in 1963.)
Kappa Upsilon	1972–1979	Quinnipiac University	Hamden	Connecticut	Inactive	
**Kappa Phi**	1971	University of North Carolina at Charlotte	Charlotte	North Carolina	Active	(Note: Chapter formed from Delta Phi Zeta, established in 1969.)
**Kappa Chi**	1970	Youngstown State University	Youngstown	Ohio	Active	(Note: Chapter formed from Chi Delta, established in 1967.)
**Kappa Psi**	1972	Shippensburg University of Pennsylvania	Shippensburg	Pennsylvania	Active	
Kappa Omega	1972–1980	Limestone College	Gaffney	South Carolina	Inactive	
**Lambda Alpha**	1977	Arkansas Tech University	Russellville	Arkansas	Active	(Note: Chapter formed from Sigma Delta Chi, established in 1976.)
**Lambda Beta**	1976	University of Southern Indiana	Evansville	Indiana	Active	(Note: Chapter formed from Phi Beta Chi, established in 1969.)
**Lambda Gamma**	1977	Jacksonville State University	Jacksonville	Alabama	Active	
**Lambda Delta**	1977	University of Virginia	Charlottesville	Virginia	Active	(Note: Chapter formed from Zeta Delta, established in 1976.)
Lambda Epsilon	1972–2003	University Pittsburgh at Johnstown	Johnstown	Pennsylvania	Inactive	
Lambda Zeta	1972–1985	University of Southern Maine		Maine	Inactive	
Lambda Eta					Unassigned	
**Lambda Theta**	1975	Michigan Technological University	Houghton	Michigan	Active	
Lambda Iota	1977–199x ?	University of Rochester	Rochester	New York	Inactive	
**Lambda Kappa**	1977	University of Alabama in Huntsville	Huntsville	Alabama	Active	
**Lambda Lambda**	1977	The College of New Jersey	Ewing Township	New Jersey	Active	(Note: Chapters formed from ZBT Little Sisters, established in 1975.)
Lambda Mu					Unassigned	
**Lambda Nu**	1977	Auburn University at Montgomery	Montgomery	Alabama	Active	
**Lambda Xi**	1975	Texas A&M University	College Station	Texas	Active	
**Lambda Omicron**	1975	Angelo State University	San Angelo	Texas	Active	
**Lambda Pi**	1974	Georgia College & State University	Milledgeville	Georgia	Active	(Note: Chapter formed from Alpha Pi Omega, established in 1972.)
**Lambda Rho**	1973	Illinois State University	Normal	Illinois	Active	
**Lambda Sigma**	1977	Winthrop University	Rock Hill	South Carolina	Active	
Lambda Tau					Unassigned	
Lambda Upsilon					Unassigned	
**Lambda Phi**	1973	Appalachian State University	Boone	North Carolina	Active	
Lambda Chi					Unassigned	
**Lambda Psi**	1975–1985; 1994	Columbus State University	Columbus	Georgia	Active	
Lambda Omega	1973–1980	William Paterson University	Wayne	New Jersey	Inactive	(Note: Chapter formed from Phi Omega Psi, established in 1922)
Xi Alpha	1981–2005	University of Massachusetts Amherst	Amherst	Massachusetts	Inactive	
**Xi Beta**	1982	Eastern Kentucky University	Richmond	Kentucky	Active	
Xi Gamma					Unassigned	
**Xi Delta**	1983	Radford University	Radford	Virginia	Active	
Xi Epsilon					Unassigned	
Xi Zeta					Unassigned	
**Xi Eta**	1984	Northwood University	Midland	Michigan	Active	
**Xi Theta**	1979	University of North Carolina Wilmington	Wilmington	North Carolina	Active	
**Xi Iota**	1984	Muhlenberg College	Allentown	Pennsylvania	Active	
Xi Kappa	1978–2007	Rowan University	Glassboro	New Jersey	Inactive	(Note: Chapter formed from Phi Kappa Nu, established in 1969.)
**Xi Lambda**	1983	University of San Francisco	San Francisco	California	Active	
Xi Mu					Unassigned	
**Xi Nu**	1985	Tarleton State University	Stephenville	Texas	Active	(Note: Chapter formed from Zetas, established in 1983.)
**Xi Xi**	1989	University of North Georgia	Dahlonega	Georgia	Active	(Note: Chapter formed from Zeta Delta Alpha, established in 19xx ?)
**Xi Omicron**	1986	Loyola Marymount University	Los Angeles	California	Active	(Note: Chapter formed from Kappa Theta.)
Xi Pi	1989-1996	Lehigh University	Bethlehem	Pennsylvania	Inactive	
**Xi Rho**	1986	Clarkson University	Potsdam	New York	Active	
Xi Sigma	1988–2003	University of North Carolina at Chapel Hill	Chapel Hill	North Carolina	Inactive	
**Xi Tau**	1988	Millersville University of Pennsylvania	Millersville	Pennsylvania	Active	
**Xi Upsilon**	1989	Northeastern University	Boston	Massachusetts	Active	(Note: Chapter formed from Gamma Phi.)
**Xi Phi**	1987	University of Missouri–Kansas City	Kansas City	Missouri	Active	(Note: Chapter formed from Pi Theta Xi.)
**Xi Chi**	1981	Robert Morris University	Moon Township	Pennsylvania	Active	(Note: Chapter formed from delta Zeta Chi, established in 1970)
**Xi Psi**	1987	Grand Valley State University	Allendale	Michigan	Active	(Note: Chapter formed from Chi Omega Delta, established in 1981.)
**Xi Omega**	1988	Purdue University	West Lafayette	Indiana	Active	
**Omicron Alpha**	1989	St. Mary's University	San Antonio	Texas	Active	(Note: Chapter formed from N.U.V., established in 1987.)
**Omicron Beta**	1990	Stockton University	Galloway Township	New Jersey	Active	
**Omicron Gamma**	1990	Ohio University	Athens	Ohio	Active	
**Omicron Delta**	1991	Bryant University	Smithfield	Rhode Island	Active	(Note: Chapter formed from Sigma Iota, established in 1944.)
**Omicron Epsilon**	1991	Arkansas State University	Jonesboro	Arkansas	Active	
**Omicron Zeta**	1991	Randolph–Macon College	Ashland	Virginia	Active	
Omicron Eta					Unassigned	
Omicron Theta					Unassigned	
Omicron Iota	1991–1999	Mount Union College	Alliance	Ohio	Inactive	
Omicron Kappa	1991–2002	University at Albany, SUNY	Albany	New York	Inactive	(Note: Chapter formed from Pi Sigma Chi, established in 1986.)
**Omicron Lambda**	1992	North Carolina State University	Raleigh	North Carolina	Active	
**Omicron Mu**	1992	University of South Carolina Upstate	Valley Falls	South Carolina	Active	(Note: Chapter formed from Gamma Psi Delta, established in 1987.)
**Omicron Nu**	1992	University of Windsor	Windsor	Ontario	Active	
**Omicron Xi**	1993	Mars Hill University	Mars Hill	North Carolina	Active	
**Omicron Omicron**	1993	Lindenwood University	St. Charles	Missouri	Active	
**Omicron Pi**	1993	Frostburg State University	Frostburg	Maryland	Active	
Omicron Rho					Unassigned	
Omicron Sigma	1994–2023	Gallaudet University	Washington, D.C.	District of Columbia	Inactive	
Omicron Tau	1994–2000	Brock University	St. Catharines	Ontario	Inactive	
Omicron Upsilon					Unassigned	
Omicron Phi	1994–2002	Alfred University	Alfred	New York	Inactive	
Omicron Chi	1997–2002	Santa Clara University	Santa Clara	California	Inactive	
Omicron Psi					Unassigned	
Omicron Omega					Unassigned	
**Pi Alpha**	2002	University of Florida	Gainesville	Florida	Active	
**Pi Beta**	2002	University of Hartford	West Hartford	Connecticut	Active	
**Pi Gamma**	2004	California State University, Northridge	Los Angeles	California	Active	
**Pi Delta**	2003	Wake Forest University	Winston-Salem	North Carolina	Active	
**Pi Epsilon**	2005	Clemson University	Clemson	South Carolina	Active	
**Pi Zeta**	2005	Arizona State University	Tempe	Arizona	Active	
Pi Eta					Unassigned	
**Pi Theta**	2011	Rollins College	Winter Park	Florida	Active	
**Pi Kappa**	2012	University of Idaho	Moscow	Idaho	Active	
**Pi Lambda**	2011	University of Tennessee at Chattanooga	Chattanooga	Tennessee	Active	
Pi Mu					Unassigned	
Pi Nu					Unassigned	
**Pi Xi**	2012	University of Central Florida	Orlando	Florida	Active	
**Pi Omicron**	2014	Indiana University Indianapolis	Indianapolis	Indiana	Active	
Pi Pi					Unassigned	
**Pi Rho**	2014	University of West Georgia	Carrollton	Georgia	Active	
**Pi Sigma**	2014	University of Texas at Dallas	Richardson	Texas	Active	
**Pi Tau**	2015	Sacred Heart University	Fairfield	Connecticut	Active	(Note: Chapter formed from Kappa Phi, established in 1993.)
**Pi Upsilon**	2015	LIU Post	Brookville	New York	Active	
**Pi Phi**	2015	Cleveland State University	Cleveland	Ohio	Active	(Note: Chapter formed from Chi Delta Sigma, established in 2002.)
**Pi Chi**	2015	Western Kentucky University	Bowling Green	Kentucky	Active	
**Pi Psi**	2016	California State University San Marcos	San Marcos	California	Active	
**Pi Omega**	2016	Johnson & Wales University	Providence	Rhode Island	Active	
**Rho Alpha**	2016	Murray State University	Murray	Kentucky	Active	
