= List of Sigma Lambda Upsilon chapters =

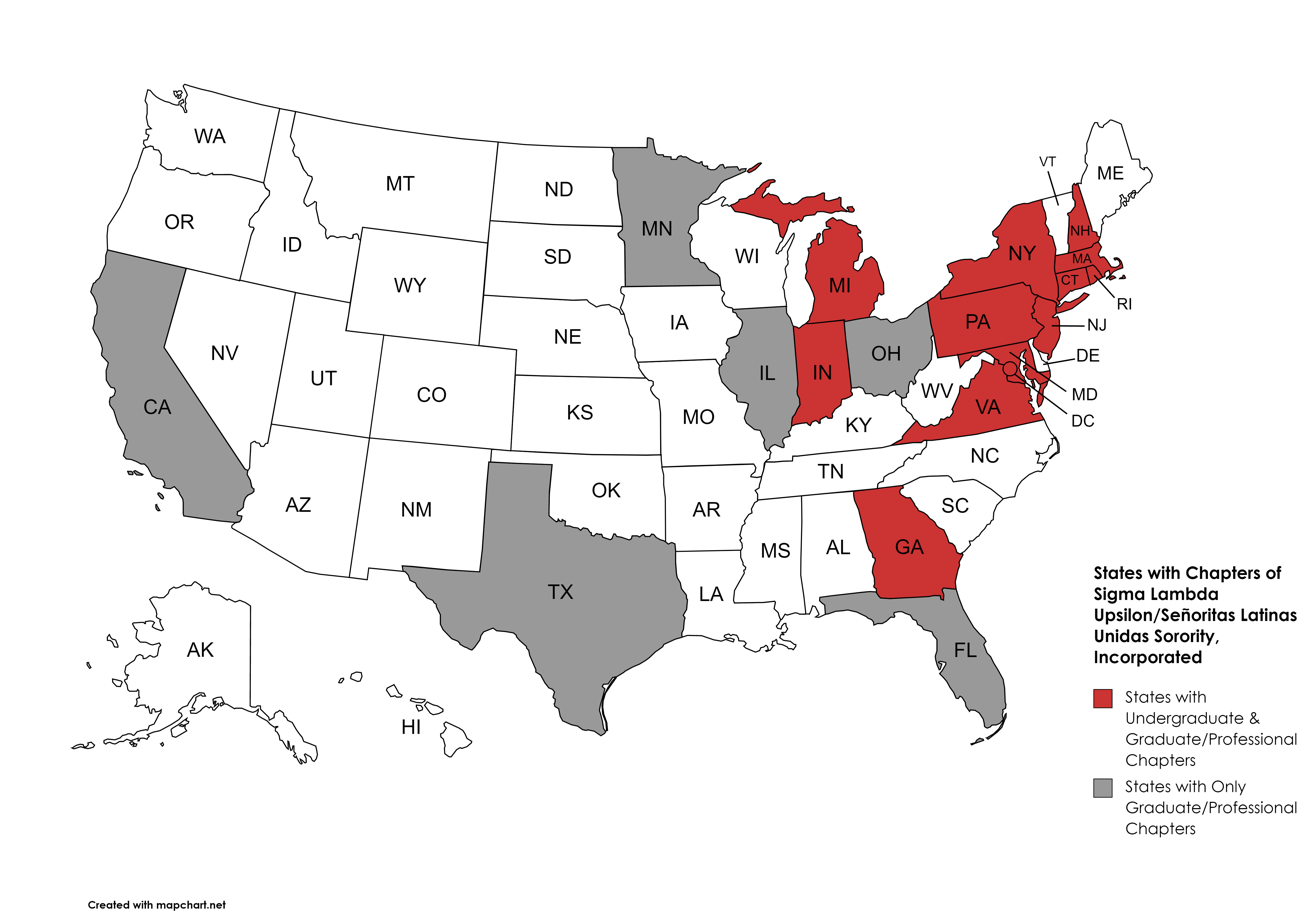
Sigma Lambda Upsilon locations

Sigma Lambda Upsilon is an American sorority that is Latina-based sorority. It was founded on December 1, 1987, at Binghamton University.

Sigma Lambda Upsilon has chartered 47 undergraduate chapters and seventeen graduate chapters. It also has a memorial chapter for deceased members.

== Undergraduate chapters ==
In the following list of Sigma Lambda Upsilon undergraduate chapters, active chapters are indicated in bold and inactive chapters and institutions are in italics.

Chapter	Charter date and range	Institution	Location	Status	Ref.
**Alpha**	December 1, 1987	Binghamton University	Vestal, New York	Active	
**Beta**	1989	Buffalo State College	Buffalo, New York	Active	
**Beta**	1989	Daemen College	Amherst and Brooklyn, New York	Active	
**Beta**	1989	University at Buffalo	Buffalo, New York	Active	
**Gamma**	1990	Bryn Mawr College,	Philadelphia, Pennsylvania	Active	
**Gamma**	1990	Drexel University	Philadelphia, Pennsylvania	Active	
**Gamma**	1990	Saint Joseph's University	Philadelphia, Pennsylvania	Active	
**Gamma**	1990	Temple University	Philadelphia, Pennsylvania	Active	
**Gamma**	1990	University of Pennsylvania	Philadelphia, Pennsylvania	Active	
Delta	1990–xxxx ?	Brown University	Providence, Rhode Island	Inactive	
Epsilon	1991–20xx ?	State University of New York at Cortland	Cortland, New York	Inactive	
Zeta	1992–xxxx ?	State University of New York at Oswego	Oswego, New York	Inactive	
**Eta**	1992	Syracuse University	Syracuse, New York	Active	
**Iota**	1993	Cornell University	Ithaca, New York	Active	
**Iota**	1993	Ithaca College	Ithaca, New York	Active	
Kappa	1993–xxxx ?	Princeton University	Princeton, New Jersey	Inactive	
**Lambda**	1995	Rutgers University–New Brunswick	New Brunswick, New Jersey	Active	
**Mu**	1996	College of Saint Rose	Albany, New York	Active	
**Mu**	1996	Rensselaer Polytechnic Institute	Troy, New York	Active	
**Mu**	1996	University at Albany, SUNY	Albany, New York	Active	
Nu	1997–20xx ?	Pennsylvania State University	University Park, Pennsylvania	Inactive	
Xi	1999–20xx ?	University of Rhode Island	Kingston, Rhode Island	Inactive	
Omicron	1999–20xx ?	Baruch College	New York City, New York	Inactive	
Omicron	1999–20xx ?	City College of New York	New York City, New York	Inactive	
Omicron	1999–20xx ?	New York University	New York City, New York	Inactive	
Pi	1999–20xx ?	Yale University	New Haven, Connecticut	Inactive	
Rho	1999	Johnson & Wales University	Providence, Rhode Island	Inactive	
Sigma	2000–20xx ?	Union College	Schenectady, New York	Inactive	
**Tau**	2000	Rutgers University–Newark	Newark, New Jersey	Active	
**Tau**	2000	Stevens Institute of Technology	Hoboken, New Jersey	Active	
Upsilon	2000–20xx ?	University of Maryland, College Park	College Park, Maryland	Inactive	
Phi	2000–20xx ?	Smith College	Northampton, Massachusetts	Inactive	
Phi	2000–20xx ?	University of Massachusetts Amherst	Amherst, Massachusetts	Inactive	
Chi	2001–20xx ?	Boston University	Boston, Massachusetts	Inactive	
Chi	2001–20xx ?	Brandeis University	Waltham, Massachusetts	Inactive	
Chi	2001–20xx ?	Massachusetts Institute of Technology	Cambridge, Massachusetts	Inactive	
Chi	2001–20xx ?	Tufts University	Medford and Somerville, Massachusetts	Inactive	
**Psi**	2002	Nazareth University	Pittsford, New York	Active	
**Psi**	2002	Rochester Institute of Technology	Rochester, New York	Active	
**Psi**	2002	St. John Fisher University	Rochester, New York	Active	
**Psi**	2002	University of Rochester	Rochester, New York	Active	
**Omega**	2002	Old Dominion University	Norfolk, Virginia	Active	
Alpha Alpha	2003–20xx ?	Barnard College	New York	Inactive	
Alpha Alpha	2003–20xx ?	Columbia University	New York	Inactive	
Alpha Beta	2003–20xx ?	Dartmouth College	Hanover, New Hampshire	Inactive	
**Alpha Gamma**	2003	George Washington University	Washington, D.C.	Active	
Alpha Delta	2005–20xx ?	State University of New York at Stony Brook	Stony Brook, New York	Inactive	
Alpha Epsilon	2005	State University of New York at Plattsburgh	Plattsburgh, New York	Inactive	
Alpha Zeta	2005–20xx ?	Virginia Commonwealth University	Richmond, Virginia	Inactive	
**Alpha Eta**	2006	Indiana University Bloomington	Bloomington, Indiana	Active	
Alpha Theta	2007–20xx ?	Wesleyan University	Middletown, Connecticut	Inactive	
Alpha Iota	2008–20xx ?	Hamilton College	Clifton, New York	Inactive	
**Alpha Kappa**	2008	Adelphi University	Garden City, New York	Active	
**Alpha Lambda**	2009	Montclair State University	Montclair, New Jersey	Active	
**Alpha Mu**	2009	State University of New York at New Paltz	New Paltz, New York	Active	
Alpha Nu	2009–20xx ?	Grand Valley State University, Grand Rapids Campus	Grand Rapids, Michigan	Inactive	
Alpha Xi	2011–20xx ?	Pace University, Pleasantville Campus	Pleasantville, New York	Inactive	
**Alpha Omicron**	2011	University of Connecticut	Storrs, Connecticut	Active	
**Alpha Pi**	2012	Georgia State University	Atlanta, Georgia	Active	
**Alpha Rho**	2013	University of Virginia	Charlottesville, Virginia	Active	
Alpha Sigma	2016–20xx ?	Farmingdale State College	East Farmingdale, New York	Inactive	
**Alpha Tau**	2016	James Madison University	Harrisonburg, Virginia	Active	
**Alpha Upsilon**	2019	Indiana University-Purdue University Indianapolis	Indianapolis, Indiana	Active	
**Alpha Phi**	2019	Kennesaw State University	Kennesaw, Georgia	Active	
Alpha Chi	2019	University of Georgia	Athens, Georgia	Inactive	
**Alpha Omega**				Memorial	

== Graduate chapters ==
Sigma Lambda Upsilon's graduate chapters are open to alumnae as well as alumnae initiates.

Chapter	Location	Status	Ref.
Theta Alpha	New York City, New York	Active	
Theta Beta	Providence, Rhode Island	Inactive	
Theta Gamma	Albany, New York	Active	
Theta Delta	Texas	Inactive	
Theta Epsilon	Buffalo, New York	Inactive	
Theta Zeta	Philadelphia, Pennsylvania	Active	
Theta Eta	New Jersey	Active	
Theta Theta	Maryland, Northern Virginia, and Washington, D.C.	Active	
Theta Iota	Florida	Active	
Theta Kappa	California	Active	
Theta Lambda	Harrisburg, Pennsylvania	Active	
Theta Mu	Boston, Massachusetts	Active	
Theta Nu	Illinois, Indiana, Michigan, and Ohio	Active	
Theta Xi	Rochester, New York	Inactive	
Theta Omicron	Westchester County, New York	Active	
Theta Pi	Atlanta, Georgia	Active	
Theta Rho	Long Island, New York	Inactive	
Theta Sigma	Central Virginia and Southern Virginia	Active	
