= Alpha Beta Psi =

Sorority in Virginia, U.S.

- ΑΒΨ
- Founded: October 22, 1978; 47 years ago Richard Bland College
- Type: Social
- Affiliation: Independent
- Status: Active
- Scope: Local
- Motto: "To Embrace Individuality"
- Colors: Baby blue and Navy Blue
- Symbol: Sword in Stone
- Flower: Forget-Me-Not
- Mascot: Betta fish
- Philanthropy: Domestic Violence Awareness
- Chapters: 1 active, 2 chartered
- Headquarters: Farmville, Virginia; United States
- Website: alphabetapsibetachapter.weebly.com

Alpha Beta Psi (ΑΒΨ) is a collegiate sorority in Virginia, United States. The organization was founded in 1978 at Richard Bland College.

== History ==
Alpha Beta Psi originated from the high school sorority Alpha Beta Sigma. It formed at the Richard Bland College of William & Mary on October 22, 1978. Its founders were Cindy Gittman Shortilidge, Trina Samuel Anders, Christy Wright Clarke, and Donna Wright Bowen. The sorority's purpose is to bring together women from different socio-economic and cultural backgrounds to actively lead social service programs within the school and community.

Alpha Beta Psi expanded with Beta chapter at Longwood University in 1998. The sorority dissolved temporarily in 2002 due to low numbers. The Alpha chapter was reestablished on April 13, 2008 under the leadership of Meghan Czaikoski, Lauren Lauderdale, Audrey Tremblay, and Angela Wendland.

The Longwood University Greek system was initially hesitant to welcome back Alpha Beta Psi. The sorority and organizations like it was required to face prejudicial "...barriers that had 'not been appropriate'" to discourage their affiliation with campus Greek life. Beta chapter regained its official recognition as an on-campus sorority almost exactly six years later on April 22, 2014. In 2015, it became an associate of the College Panhellenic Council. On July 22, 2021, the chapter received a chapter room on campus in Stubbs Hall.

== Symbols ==
Alpha Beta Psi's motto is "To Embrace Individuality". The sorority's colors are baby blue and navy blue. Its mascot is the Betta fish. Its flower is the forget-me-not. Its symbol in the sword in the stone.

== Philanthropy ==
The sorority's philanthropy is dedicated to domestic violence awareness, specifically through its partnership with local women's shelter Madeline's House. The sisters contribute their time to FACES, a local emergency food service center and The Woodlands, a nearby rehabilitation center. Alpha Beta Psi also participates in Relay for Life with The American Cancer Society.

== Chapters ==
Chapter	Charter date and range	Institution	Location	Status	Ref.
Alpha	October 22, 1978 – 200x ?; April 13, 2008 – 20xx ?	Richard Bland College	Prince George County, Virginia	Inactive	
Beta	1998–2002; April 22, 2014	Longwood University	Farmville, Virginia	Active	

== See also ==
- List of social sororities and women's fraternities
