= Kappa Delta Kappa =

Social sorority at Ursinus College, Pennsylvania, US

- ΚΔΚ
- Founded: November 22, 1938; 86 years ago Ursinus College
- Type: Social
- Affiliation: Independent
- Status: Active
- Scope: Local
- Motto: "A bond that will not falter as the years go by."
- Colors: Green and Gold
- Symbol: Scales; Dove
- Flower: Yellow Talisman rose
- Mascot: Winking cat
- Chapters: 1
- Headquarters: Collegeville, Pennsylvania; United States

Kappa Delta Kappa (ΚΔΚ), also known as KDK, is an American local sorority established in 1938 at Ursinus College in Collegeville, Pennsylvania.

== History ==
The first meeting of Kappa Delta Kappa was held on November 22, 1938, in the South Hall dormitory (now Musser Hall) of Ursinus College in Collegeville, Pennsylvania. Its founders were Claire Borrell, Lucia Citta, Jean Clawson, Dorothy Cullen, Elizabeth Funk, and Blanche Schultz. Borrell was its first president.

Kappa Delta Kappa was established as a social organization that would "create a closer tie between the alumni and the undergraduate women, and to provide a group which will cooperate toward the advancement of Ursinus College." The sorority began admitting all non-male identifying students in 2015.

== Symbols ==
The Greek letters Kappa Delta Kappa stand for the Greek words for beauty (Kappa), justice (Delta), and Purity (Kappa). The sorority's motto's is "a bond that will not falter as the years go by." Its crest features the rose to symbolize beauty, scales for justice, and the dove for purity. The sorority's colors are green and gold. Its mascot is the Winking Cat. Its flower is the yellow Tailisan rose.

== Membership ==
Membership in Kappa Delta Kappa is open to sophomores, juniors, and seniors at Ursinus College who are non-male identifying genders. It accepts women of any race, sexual orientation, or religion.

== See also ==
- List of social sororities and women's fraternities
