= Tau Mu Tau =

Social sorority at Gustavus Adolphus College, Minnesota, US

- ΤΜΤ
- Founded: 1904; 122 years ago Gustavus Adolphus College
- Type: Social
- Affiliation: Independent
- Status: Active
- Scope: Local
- Motto: "Sisterhood and Diversity"
- Colors: Maroon and Gray
- Symbol: Anchor
- Flower: Rose
- Chapters: 1
- Nickname: TMs
- Headquarters: 800 West College Avenue; Saint Peter, Minnesota 56082; United States
- Website: tmtgacsorority2015.wixsite.com/taumutausorority

Tau Mu Tau (ΤΜΤ) is a local sorority at Gustavus Adolphus College in St. Peter, Minnesota, United States. It was established in 1904.

== History ==
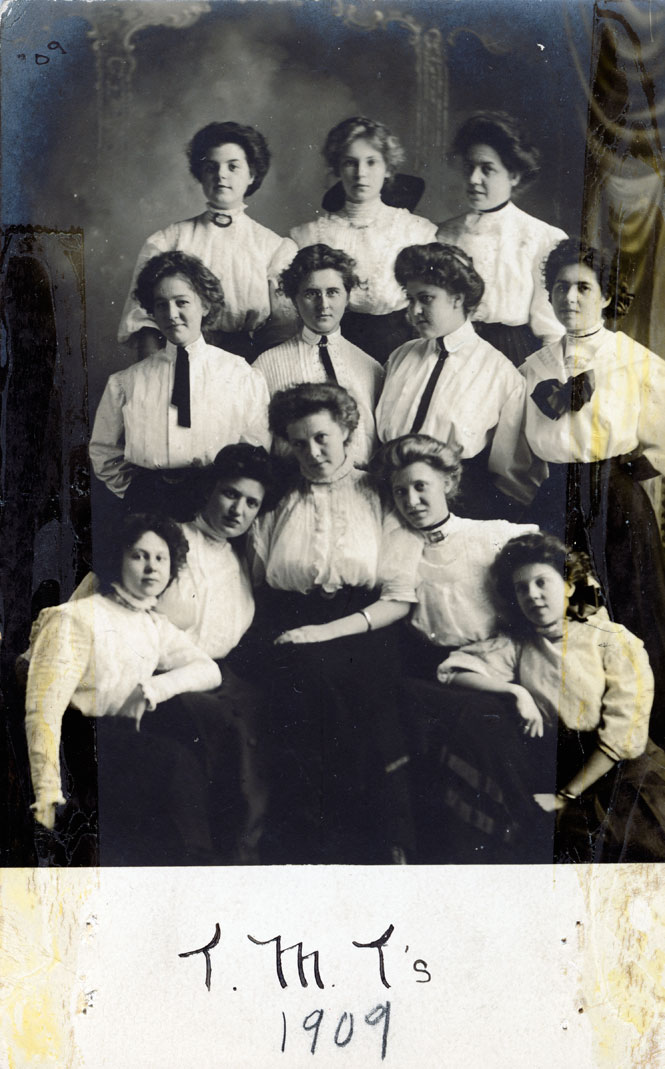
Tau Mu Tau charter members: Back Row: Ruth Cassel, Xeni Mellgren, and Ruth E. Anderson. Middle Row: Dena Asplund, Anna Haglund, Hazel Carlson, and Edith Malmstrom. Bottom Row: Dorothy Nystrom, Minnie Almen, Frances Carlson, Mabel Lucken, and Margaret Nystrom.

Twelve students. founded Tau Mu Tau at Gustavus Adolphus College in St. Peter, Minnesota, in 1904. It was the first sorority to be established at the college. It was originally a college literary society and evolved into having a more social focus. The twelve-member society was originally known as The Modest Twelve. The charter members were Minnie Almen, Ruth E. Anderson, Dena Asplund, Frances Carlson, Hazel Carlson, Ruth Cassel, Anna Haglund, Mabel Lucken, Edith Malmstrom, Xeni Mellgren, Dorothy Nystrom, and Margaret Nystrom. Cassel was its first president.

When its membership expanded, Tau Mu Tau changed its named to The Modest Tribe. In its early days, the sorority held meetings where members would perform music, make a recital, read a paper, or perform a vocal solo. By 1933, the Tau Mu Tau Alumnae Association had been established. During the 1930s, the sorority traditionally held a Harlem party and other social events during the rush season. It also held pledge dinners, a carnival, themed formal banquets, and reunion homecomings for alumnae.

In the 1950s, Tau Mu Tau selected Omega Kappa as its brother fraternity. The sorority's focus shifted from literary activities to social events and fundraising for charities. In the early1990s, the college banned fraternities and sororities, resulting in a hiatus of the sorority until 1993.

The sorority lost its recognition by the college in 2007 when its membership fell below the required number of ten members. It was able to return to campus in 2008. In the fall of 2016, the sorority was one of four Greek letter organizations suspended by Gustavus Adolphus College for violations of its hazing and sexual harassment policies. Tau Mu Tau was suspended for three years for issues related to song lyrics used during an annual "sing off" competition. Members noted that many of the songs in question dated to its founding.

The sorority was active again by 2024. It is an independent organization that is not affiliated with any national or international organization.

== Symbols ==
Tau Mu Tau's motto is "Sisterhood and Diversity". The sorority's colors are maroon and gray. Its symbol is the anchor, and its flower is the rose. Its nickname is the TMs.

Sorority Song
From year to year,
Our hearts in closest kin shall be.

Though we are near,
Or far across the sea.
Forevermore,
The Tau Mu Tau sorority
Shall find our hearts as one
No matter where we be.
Our song we'll sing,
From now until eternity.
With gladness ring
Our pledge of unity.
Until the hills
Ring out that echoed melody.

Then all the world will know the sisterhood it brings!

== Activities ==
Tau Mu Tau annual events are fall and spring banquets and the TM/Theta Valentine's Day semi-formal. The sorority is active in several nonprofit organizations such as Relay for Life, SAVE (Suicide Awareness Voices in Education), the St. Peter Food Shelf, and The Salvation Army. It also participates in Patrick's Homecoming Fundraiser and Sober Drivers.

== See also ==
- List of social sororities and women's fraternities
