= Phi Sigma Nu =

American collegiate Native American fraternity

- ΦΣΝ
- Founded: February 13, 1996; 30 years ago University of North Carolina at Pembroke
- Type: Social
- Affiliation: Independent
- Status: Active
- Emphasis: Native Americans
- Scope: National
- Motto: "Men of Valor. Men of Pride"
- Pillars: Leadership, Individuality, Community, Honesty, Wisdom, Pride, and Unity
- Colors: Red, Yellow, Black, and White
- Symbol: Snapping Turtle
- Publication: Warrior's Words
- Chapters: 6 active collegiate 1 active professional
- Colonies: 1 professional
- Headquarters: PO Box 2040; Pembroke, North Carolina 28372; United States
- Website: www.phisigmanu.com//

Phi Sigma Nu (ΦΣΝ) is the oldest and largest Native American fraternity in the United States. It was founded in 1996 in North Carolina.

== History ==
Phi Sigma Nu is a Native American fraternity founded on February 13, 1996 as a student organization at the University of North Carolina at Pembroke. Its founding fathers and their tribal affiliations are Tony Carter (Lumbee), Earl Evans (Haliwa-Saponi), Clarence “Bo” Goins II (Lumbee), Chad Hedgepeth (Haliwa-Saponi), Sandon Jacobs (Waccamaw Siouan), Greg Richardson (Haliwa-Saponi), Marty Richardson (Haliwa-Saponi), and James Worriax (Lumbee).

Phi Sigma Nu was recognized as a Greek letter fraternity on February 3, 1997. It is the first national Native American Indian fraternity to be formed in the United States. The fraternity uses no alcohol in its ceremonies or initiation, as these ceremonies are viewed as a purifying processes.

As of August 29, 2020, the fraternity reports it has more than 400 brothers representing more than 55 tribes. The fraternity is recognized by the Association of Fraternity/Sorority Advisors.

== Symbols ==
The motto of Phi Sigma Nu is "Men of Valor. Men of Pride." The fraternity's seven founding principles or pillars are Leadership, Individuality, Community, Honesty, Wisdom, Pride, and Unity

Its colors are red, yellow, black, and white. Its symbol is the snapping turtle. Its publication is Warriors Words.

== Governance ==
Phi Sigma Nu is governed by a National Chief Council, an elected body of national officers presided over by a chief president. The current chief president is Brian Hunt. The fraternity's national heaquarters are in Pembroke, North Carolina.

== Chapters ==
=== Collegiate chapters ===
Follow are Phi Sigma Nu's collegiate chapters, with active chapters indicated in bold and inactive chapters in italics.

Chapter	Charter date and range	Institution	Location	Status	Ref.
**Alpha**	February 13, 1996	University of North Carolina at Pembroke	Pembroke, North Carolina	Active	
**Beta**	April 18, 2001	North Carolina State University	Raleigh, North Carolina	Active	
**Gamma**	October 31, 2003	University of North Carolina at Chapel Hill	Chapel Hill, North Carolina	Active	
Delta	April 2, 2006 – 2017	Oklahoma State University–Stillwater	Stillwater, Oklahoma	Inactive	
Epsilon	April 22, 2006 – 2021	Northeastern State University	Tahlequah, Oklahoma	Inactive	
Zeta	November 1, 2007 – 2015	Arizona State University	Phoenix, Arizona	Inactive	
Eta	2011–20xx ?	University of North Carolina at Charlotte	Charlotte, North Carolina	Inactive	
Theta	2011–20xx ?	New Mexico State University	Las Cruces, New Mexico	Inactive	
**Iota**	April 1, 2014	Haskell Indian Nations University	Lawrence, Kansas	Active	
**Kappa**	2014	Dartmouth College	Hanover, New Hampshire	Active	
**Lambda**	2016	Southeastern Oklahoma State University	Durant, Oklahoma	Active	

=== Professional Chapters ===
The Fraternity provides for alumni and volunteer networking after graduation with Professional Chapters that are formed to provide local alumni support of campus chapters. Active chapters are indicated in bold and inactive chapters are in italics.

Chapter	Charter date and range	Location	Status	Ref.
**Nu Alpha**	December 15, 2007	Southeastern North Carolina	Active	
**Nu Beta**		Kansas	Provisional	
Nu Gamma		Oklahoma	Inactive	

== See also ==
- Alpha Pi Omega sorority
- Cultural interest fraternities and sororities
- List of social fraternities and sororities
