= Sigma Psi =

Local sorority at Case Western Reserve University

- ΣΨ
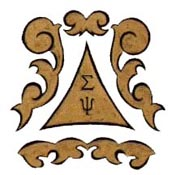
- Founded: March 7, 1897; 129 years ago Western Reserve College
- Type: Social
- Affiliation: Independent
- Status: Dormant
- Scope: Local
- Motto: "Ever Faithful"
- Colors: Green and Gold
- Symbol: Butterfly
- Flower: Daffodil and Yellow Rose
- Jewel: Emerald and Pearl
- Philanthropy: Cleveland Metroparks
- Chapters: 1
- Headquarters: 11923 Carlton Road; Cleveland, Ohio 44106; United States
- Website: www.sigmapsi.org

Sigma Psi (ΣΨ) was a local sorority founded at Western Reserve College in Cleveland, Ohio, on March 7, 1897. Sigma Psi was the oldest sorority on Case Western Reserve University's campus (CWRU), and one of the oldest local sororities in the United States, advocating values such as sincerity, faithfulness, and fidelity.

== History ==
The first sororities at Western Reserve University began as Greek study groups with a focus on self-improvement. On March 7, 1897, Elsie Davies, Cornelia Olmstead, Grace Lottridge, Edith Lottridge, and Anna Camp formed the Sigma Psi Women's Fraternity, "for the intellectual and social benefits of its members." The first pledge class was composed of these five, plus Mary Case, Clare Metcalf, and Elizabeth Coit. All eight women are considered the founding members of the fraternity.

In 1997, Sigma Psi celebrated its centennial anniversary, holding a community-wide celebration with alumni from across the country in attendance. The Sigma Psi common room contains an American flag that was flown over the United States Capitol by former Senator Louis Stokes in honor of the centennial, as well as a letter from then-President Bill Clinton congratulating the sorority on its accomplishment. In 2015, the sorority amended its membership bylaws to allow non-binary individuals.

On February 20, 2024, Sigma Psi announced its intention to close at the end of the academic year. The announcement was met with a mix of heartbreak and resilience from its members, as well as the Greek community at CWRU.

== Symbols ==
Sigma Psi's colors are green and gold. The official flowers of Sigma Psi are the daffodil and the yellow rose, and the official symbol is the butterfly. Sigma Psi's official gemstones are emeralds and pearls, which edge the formal badge. The crest is a black triangle edged with gold and emblazoned with the Greek letters, surrounded by several golden wreaths. The badge is a simple black triangle featuring the Greek letters ΣΨ and edged with gold. This badge is given to all active sisters upon initiation.

== Philanthropy ==
Sigma Psi has supported a variety of philanthropies throughout its history. Since 2020, Sigma Psi has supported the Cleveland Metroparks, a local organization consisting of eighteen reservations, 24,000 acres (9,700 ha) with more than 300 miles (480 km) of trails, and a zoo.

== See also ==
- List of social sororities and women's fraternities
