= Chi Iota Pi =

American collegiate sorority

- ΧΙΠ
- Founded: November 23, 2004; 21 years ago University of Maryland, College Park
- Type: Social
- Affiliation: Independent
- Status: Defunct
- Emphasis: Multicultural - Service
- Scope: National
- Motto: "Real Women. Real Sisterhood."
- Pillars: Compassion, Integrity, Perseverance
- Colors: Royal Blue and White
- Symbol: Heart
- Flower: White Rose
- Mascot: Puma
- Chapters: 3
- Colonies: 2
- Nicknames: Pi's, CIP
- Headquarters: College Park, Maryland; United States
- Website: www.chi-iota-pi.org

Chi Iota Pi Sorority, Inc. (ΧΙΠ) is an American multicultural collegiate sorority founded on November 23, 2004, by eight women from the University of Maryland. The sorority has expanded to several institutions and has reached a higher level of diversity. The organization focuses on empowering its sisters, campus communities, local communities, and larger communities through education, advocacy, service, and social programming.

== History ==
Chi Iota Pi was founded on November 23, 2004, by eight women from the University of Maryland. The founders included Jacqueline Argueta, Nathalie Argueta, Jessica Ayala, Jeet Bahra, Dinora Hernandez, Cindy Juarez, Jessica Martinez, and Janina Rivera.

Chi Iota Pi was established as a "culturally-unbiased sorority". Its founders' ethnicities included Caucasian, Latina, and South Asian. Chi Iota Pi was incorporated in January 2005 as a service-based sorority.

As stated on the Chi Iota Pi website:

The purpose of Chi Iota Pi is to establish a multifaceted sisterhood based on Compassion, Integrity, and Perseverance. Chi Iota Pi will accomplish this through community service, and educational and social programming that aims at empowering minorities, women, and children. It is the goal of Chi Iota Pi to strive for finer womanhood and foster the growth of diverse women of leadership to catalyze change in society.

In 2005 and 2006, the sorority became a national group as it expended to other campuses. Alpha chapter at the University of Maryland was a member of the United Greek Council at UMD and was also a MICA (Multicultural Involvement and Community Advocacy) Organization.

== Symbols ==
Chi Iota Pi's colors are royal blue and white. Its symbol is the heart and its mascot is the puma. Its flower is the white rose. Its motto is "Real Women, Real Sisterhood". It pillars or principal are Compassion, Integrity, Perseverance.

== Activities ==
The sorority's service projects have mostly included participation with the ONE Campaign (founded the same year as CIP), World Children's Fund, and Feeding America. Beyond this, chapters have participated in other programs such as women empowerment programs, annual minority cancer awareness programs, and walked to fundraise for ALS, Diabetes, and Cancer.

Chi Iota Pi has a regional stroll team and a national step team.

== Chapters ==
=== Collegiate chapters ===
Following is a list of Chi Iota Pi chapters.

Chapters	Charter date	Institution	Location	Status	Ref.
Alpha	November 23, 2004	University of Maryland, College Park	College Park, Maryland	Inactive	(Note: In 2024, the sorority is no longer recognized as an existing or prior organization by the university, leading to the conclusion that it is now inactive.)
Beta	Fall 2005	University of Connecticut	Storrs, Connecticut	Inactive ?	
Gamma	November 18, 2006	Trinity Washington University	Washington, D.C.	Inactive ?	
Delta colony	Spring 2008	University System of Georgia	Georgia	Inactive ?	(Note: Chapter was originally hosted at Dalton State College and Kennesaw State University but later became a chapter for the entire state university system.)
Epsilon colony	Spring 2009	Salisbury University	Salisbury, Maryland	Inactive	

=== Alumnae chapters ===
Chapters	Charter date	Name	Location	Status	Ref.
Pi Alpha	June 2006	DC Metro Area Alumnae Chapter	Washington, D.C.	Inactive ?	

== See also ==
- Fraternities and sororities
- List of social sororities and women's fraternities
