= Zeta Chi Phi =

American multicultural college sorority

- ΖΧΦ
- Founded: January 31, 2003; 23 years ago University of Texas at San Antonio
- Type: Social
- Affiliation: Independent
- Status: Active
- Emphasis: Multicultural
- Scope: Local
- Motto: "Nothing, absolutely nothing, can stop a truly committed person"
- Pillars: Multiculturalism, Education, Democracy, Integrity, Loveliness, and Community Service
- Colors: Baby Blue and Black
- Flower: Plumeria
- Jewel: Diamond
- Mascot: Black jaguar
- Chapters: 1
- Nickname: Zetas
- Headquarters: St. Peter, Minnesota; United States
- Website: www.zetachiphi.com

Zeta Chi Phi Multicultural Sorority, Incorporated (ΖΧΦ) is a national multicultural sorority that was founded in San Antonio, Texas in 2003. It is also known as the Zetas.

== History ==
Zeta Chi Phi was founded at the University of Texas at San Antonio on January 30, 2003. It formed from a local group called Ladies for Diversity which had organized in January 2003. Its founders were Sneha Bandreddi, Marcia Davis, Amirah Saldivar-Smith, Claudia Sanchez, Janet Sapatu, Tran Tang, Maya Thomas, and Kayla Weed.

The sorority's founding pillars were multiculturalism, education, democracy, integrity, loveliness, and community service. It incorporated as the non-profit Zeta Chi Phi Multicultural Sorority, Incorporated on February 10, 2003.

The Beta chapter was established at the Florida State University but has since gone inactive. The Gamma chapter was founded by eight women at Gustavus Adolphus College in St. Peter, Minnesota on December 4, 2004. As of 2024, it is the only active chapter.

== Symbols ==
Zeta Chi Phi's colors are baby blue and black. Its flower is the plumeria and its jewel is the diamond. Its mascot is the black jaguar. The sorority's motto is "Nothing, absolutely nothing can stop a truly committed person."

== Activities ==
The sorority focuses on promoting cultural diversity and women in society. Its events include step shows, Zeta cafes, a national convention, and a Blue Diamond formal. It has also raised money for the People Helping People homeless shelter.

== Chapters ==
Following is a list of the chapters of Zeta Chi Phi. Active chapters are indicated in bold. Inactive chapters are shown in italics.

Chapter	Charter date and range	Institution	Location	Status	Ref.
Alpha	January 30, 2004 – 20xx ?	University of Texas at San Antonio	San Antonio, Texas	Inactive	
Beta	200x ?–20xx ?	Florida State University	Tallahassee, Florida	Inactive	
**Gamma**	December 4, 2004	Gustavus Adolphus College	St. Peter, Minnesota	Active	

== See also ==
- Cultural interest fraternities and sororities
- List of social sororities and women's fraternities
