= Sigma Delta Chi (sorority) =

Defunct collegiate sorority in Missouri, U.S.

- ΣΔΧ
- Founded: April 1902; 124 years ago Northeast Missouri State University
- Type: Social
- Affiliation: Independent
- Status: Merged
- Merge date: November 11, 1915
- Successor: Sigma Sigma Sigma
- Scope: Missouri
- Colors: Turquoise and Wine
- Symbol: Bow and arrow
- Flower: White carnation
- Chapters: 4
- Headquarters: , Missouri; United States

Sigma Delta Chi (ΣΔΧ) was an American regional sorority operating in Missouri from 1902 until 1915.

== History ==
In April 1902, four female students formed a "friendship club" at the First District Normal School (now Northeast Missouri State University). The club grew to nine members and the name T.T.C. was adopted. When the club grew to twelve members, its name was changed to A.O.T. It is reported that one member "could not keep her pledge," so a more "permanent" organization was formed. The result was the Alpha chapter of Sigma Delta Chi sorority.

In the summer of 1902, the "initiatory and christening service" were crafted, along with important documents. In the fall of 1902, the Beta chapter at Warrensburg Teachers College (how the University of Central Missouri) was chartered. Two years later, the Gamma chapter was chartered at Forest Park Academy and Delta at the Fifth District Normal School (now Northwest Missouri State University).

Conclaves were held every two years, beginning in 1906. The final conclave, in 1912, ruled that the sorority would only charter at normal schools. The Gamma chapter was lost as a result.

The Delta chapter dissolved in 1915 per a university ban on secret organizations. Northwest Missouri State University records indicated that its final date as March 18, 1914.

With only two chapters left, the sorority's members decided to petition a national sorority for membership. In October 1915, Alpha chapter sent a petition to Sigma Sigma Sigma. On November 11, 1915, it was installed as the Mu chapter of Sigma Sigma Sigma. Ryle's history book stated, "All indicators point to a very pleasant evening, yet the girls must have thought of the old Sigma Delta Chi, now taking its place permanently in the history of the college."

== Symbols ==
The emblem of A.O.T. was a crescent encircling a clover, with the club's initials on the leaves.

Sigma Delta Chi's colors were turquoise and wine. Its badge was a gold bow and arrow. Its flower was the white carnation.

== Chapters ==
Following are the chapters of Sigma Delta Chi, with inactive chapters and institutions in italics.

Chapter	Charter date and range	Institution	Location	Status	Ref.
Alpha	April 1902 – November 11, 1915	First District Normal School (now Truman State University)	Kirksville, Missouri	Merged (ΣΣΣ)	(Note: Chapter formed from the T.T.C. (local). It became the Mu chapter of Sigma Sigma Sigma)
Beta	October 1902 – 1915	Warrensburg Teachers College (now University of Central Missouri)	Warrensburg, Missouri	Merged (ΣΣΣ)	(Note: Become the Nu chapter of Sigma Sigma Sigma.)
Gamma	1904–1912	Forest Park Academy	St. Louis, Missouri	Inactive	(Note: The national sorority closed this chapter after adopting a rule that it would only have chapters at normal schools or teacher's colleges. Forest Park was a preparatory academy and high school. The school no longer exists; it may have been named for a popular World's Fair exhibition of the era that eventually became the campus of Washington University in St. Louis.)
Delta	1904 – March 18, 1914	Fifth District Normal School (now Northwest Missouri State University)	Maryville, Missouri	Inactive	(Note: Chapter was closed when the university briefly banned secret societies.)
