= List of social sororities and women's fraternities =

Social, traditional, or collegiate sororities, in the North American fraternal system, are those that do not promote a particular profession, as professional fraternities do, or discipline, such as service fraternities and sororities. Instead, their primary purposes are often stated as the development of character, literary or leadership ability, or to serve a simpler social purpose. A fraternity is usually understood to mean a social organization composed only of men, and a sorority is composed of women. However, many women's organizations and co-ed organizations also refer to themselves as women's fraternities.

This list of North American collegiate sororities and women's fraternities is not exhaustive. It includes only social collegiate organizations; other types of social fraternal organizations can be found under the list of general fraternities. Cultural interest sororities can be found in cultural interest fraternities and sororities. Men's and co-educational fraternities are listed in Lists of social fraternities.

Some organizations in this list have a specific major listed as a traditional emphasis. These organizations are social organizations that cater to students in those majors. Other listed fraternities have a traditional emphasis on a specific religion or ethnic background but are primarily social in function.

== Sororities and women's fraternities ==
Active groups are in bold. Inactive sororities are indicated in italics.

| Organization | Symbol | Charter date and range | Scope | Affiliation (Note: Includes the college or university for local sororities.) | Type | Crest motto (Note: Any text in Greek or Latin writing contained within the crests. This does not necessarily correspond to the motto. A few are in Spanish or French. The orthography and punctuation are as depicted in the crest's writing, and are not necessarily grammatically correct.) | Status | Ref. |
|---|---|---|---|---|---|---|---|---|
| **Alpha Beta Psi** | ΑΒΨ | 1978 | Local | Independent | Traditional | | Active | |
| **Alpha Chi Omega** | ΑΧΩ | 1885 | International | NPC | Traditional | Συσπουδάσωμεν τά ανώτατα, 'Together Let Us Seek the Heights' | Active | (Note: Originally a music sorority) |
| **Alpha Chi Theta** | ΑΧΘ | 2013 | Local | University of Victoria | Traditional | Be confident, be honourable, be valiant. | Active | |
| **Alpha Delta Alpha** | ΑΔΑ | 1980 | Local | Michigan Technological University | Traditional | Strong, Independent, & Beautiful. | Active | |
| **Alpha Delta Chi** | ΑΔΧ | 1925 | National | Independent | Christian | Katoptriðzomai 'Reflected in mirror' | Active | (Note: Includes both Latin and Greek letters.) |
| **Alpha Delta Pi** | ΑΔΠ | 1851 | International | NPC | Traditional | Ζῶμεν Ἀλλήλοις, 'We live for each other' | Active | (Note: Originally a secret society.) |
| Alpha Delta Theta | ΑΔΘ | 1919–1939 | National | NPC | Traditional | Ex Principilis Omnia Oriuntur | Inactive | (Note: Merged with Phi Mu.) |
| **Alpha Delta Theta** | ΑΔΘ | 1979 | Local | University of the South | Traditional | | Active | |
| **Alpha Epsilon Phi** | ΑΕΦ | 1909 | National | NPC | Traditional | Multa Corda, Una Causa 'Many Hearts, One Purpose' | Active | (Note: Originally a Jewish sorority) |
| **Alpha Gamma Delta** | ΑΓΔ | 1904 | International | NPC | Traditional | ΑΛΦΑ ΓΑΜΜΑ ΔΕΛΤΑ | Active | |
| **Alpha Gamma Phi** | ΑΓΦ | 1957 | Local | Hope College | Traditional | | Active | |
| **Alpha Kappa Alpha** | ΑΚΑ | 1908 | International | NPHC | African-American | ΟΦΕΛΥΟΜΕΝ ΥΠΗΡΕΤΙΔΕΣ | Active | |
| **alpha Kappa Delta Phi** | αΚΔΦ | 1990 | International | NAPA | Asian | Σορορνμ σοδαλιτασ αετερνα, 'Timeless friendship through sisterhood' | Active | |
| Alpha Kappa Psi | ΑΚΨ | 1900–1920 | National | | Traditional | | Inactive | (Note: Merged with Delta Delta Delta and dispersed to multiple sororities.) |
| **Alpha Omicron Pi** | ΑΟΠ | 1897 | International | NPC | Traditional | | Active | |
| **Alpha Phi** | ΑΦ | 1872 | International | NPC | Traditional | ζευξις χειρι εν χειρι, 'Union hand in hand' | Active | |
| **Alpha Phi Gamma** | ΑΦΓ | 1994 | National | NAPA | Asian | Σιγμα Αλπηα Αλπηα [sic] | Active | |
| **Alpha Pi Omega** | ΑΠΩ | 1994 | National | Independent | Native American | | Active | |
| **Alpha Sigma Alpha** | ΑΣΑ | 1901 | National | NPC | Traditional | ΑΓΑΣΘΕ ΣΠΕΥΔΕΤΕ ΑΙΡΕΣΘΕ, 'Aspire, seek, attain' | Active | (Note: Originally an educational sorority) |
| **Alpha Sigma Chi** | ΑΣΧ | 1923 | Local | SUNY Oswego | Traditional | | Active | (Note: Originally affiliated with Alpha Sigma Alpha.) |
| Alpha Sigma Delta | ΑΣΔ | 1918–1932 | National | Independent | Traditional | | Inactive | (Note: Merged with Lambda Omega (see Delta Zeta).) |
| **Alpha Sigma Rho** | ΑΣΡ | 1998 | National | NAPA | Asian American | | Active | |
| **Alpha Sigma Tau** | ΑΣΤ | 1899 | National | NPC | Traditional | Αλφα Σιγμα Ταυ | Active | (Note: Originally an educational sorority) |
| **Alpha Theta Beta** | ΑΘΒ | 1936 | Local | Hofstra University | Traditional | | Active | |
| **Alpha Xi Delta** | ΑΞΔ | 1893 | National | NPC | Traditional | Αλφα Ξι Δελτα | Active | |
| Beta Delta Pi | ΒΔΠ | 1887–19xx ? | International | Independent | Traditional | | Inactive | |
| Beta Phi Alpha | ΒΦΑ | 1919–1941 | National | NPC (former) | Traditional | | Inactive | (Note: Merged with Lambda Omega (see Delta Zeta).) |
| Beta Sigma Omicron | ΒΣΟ | 1888–1964 | National | NPC (former) | Traditional | | Inactive | (Note: Merged with Zeta Tau Alpha.) |
| **Beta Upsilon Delta** | ΒΥΔ | 1978 | Local | St. Joseph's University | Traditional | | Active | |
| **Ceres** | | 1984 | National | Independent | Social and agricultural | | Active | |
| **Chi Alpha Nu** | ΧΑΝ | 1927 | Local | Muskingum University | Traditional | | Active | |
| **Chi Beta Epsilon** | ΧΒΕ | 1952 | Local | Trinity University | Traditional | | Active | |
| **Chi Delta Theta** | ΧΔΘ | 1989 | National | Independent | Asian, multicultural | | Active | |
| **Chi Iota Pi** | ΧΙΠ | 2004 | National | Independent | Multicultural | | Active | |
| **Chi Omega** | ΧΩ | 1895 | National | NPC | Traditional | | Active | |
| **Chi Upsilon Sigma** | ΧΥΣ | 1980 | National | NALFO | Latina | | Active | |
| **Clovia** | | 1931 | National | Independent | 4-H origin | | Active | |
| Delta Chi Alpha | ΔΧΑ | 1878 | Regional | Independent | Traditional | | Inactive | |
| **Delta Delta Delta** | ΔΔΔ | 1888 | International | NPC | Traditional | Ἀσφαλῶς Ἀγαπῶμεν Ἀλλήλας, 'Let us steadfastly love one another' | Active | |
| **Delta Gamma** | ΔΓ | 1873 | International | NPC | Traditional | | Active | |
| **Delta Phi Epsilon** | ΔΦΕ | 1917 | International | NPC | Traditional | Esse Quam Videri, 'To be rather than to seem to be' | Active | |
| **Delta Phi Nu** | ΔΦΝ | 2008 | National | Independent | Traditional | Loyalty, Knowledge, Perseverance | Active | |
| **Delta Phi Lambda** | ΔΦΛ | 1998 | National | NAPA | Asian | | Active | |
| **Delta Phi Omega** | ΔΦΩ | 1998 | National | NAPA | South Asian | | Active | |
| Delta Sigma Epsilon | ΔΣΕ | 1914–1956 | International | NPC | Traditional | | Inactive | (Note: Merged with Delta Zeta.) |
| **Delta Sigma Theta** | ΔΣΘ | 1913 | International | NPHC | African-American | ΔΕΛΤΑ ΣΙΓΜΑ ΘΕΤΑ [sic] | Active | |
| **Delta Theta Psi** | ΔΘΨ | March 1992 | Local | College of Wooster | Local | | Active | |
| **Delta Xi Nu** | ΔΞΝ | 1997 | National | NMGC | Multicultural | | Active | |
| **Delta Xi Phi** | ΔΞΦ | 1994 | National | NMGC | Multicultural | ΔΕΛΤΑ ΞΙ ΦΙ | Active | |
| **Delta Zeta** | ΔΖ | 1902 | International | NPC | Traditional | Δια Καρτερου Ζωπυρον, 'Via strong fire' | Active | |
| **Eta Gamma Delta** | ΗΓΔ | 1928 | National | CIPFI | Puerto Rican | | Active | |
| **Eta Psi Kappa** | ΗΨΚ | 2001 | Local | University of Olivet | Traditional | | Active | |
| Eta Upsilon Gamma | ΗΥΓ | 1901 | National | JPHC | Traditional | Be Strong in the Truth | Inactive | |
| **Gamma Alpha Omega** | ΓΑΩ | 1993 | National | NALFO | Latina | Nos Una Crescemus, 'United We Will Grow' | Active | |
| **Gamma Eta** | ΓΗ | 1995 | National | NMGC | Traditional | | Active | |
| **Gamma Phi Beta** | ΓΦΒ | 1874 | International | NPC | Traditional | | Active | |
| **Gamma Rho Lambda** | ΓΡΛ | 2003 | National | Independent | LGBTQ | | Active | |
| Gamma Beta Sigma | ΓΒΣ | 1901–1909 ? | Regional | Independent | Traditional, junior | | Inactive | |
| Iota Alpha Pi | ΙΑΠ | 1903–1971 | International | NPC | Traditional | | Inactive | (Note: Sorority disbanded.) |
| **Kappa Alpha Theta** | ΚΑΘ | 1870 | International | NPC | Traditional | ΚΑΠΠΑ ΑΛΦΑ ΘΗΤΑ | Active | |
| **Kappa Beta Gamma** | ΚΒΓ | 1917 | International | Independent | Traditional | | Active | |
| **Kappa Delta** | ΚΔ | 1897 | National | NPC | Traditional | Τα Καλά Διώκομεν, 'Seeking the good' | Active | |
| **Kappa Delta Chi** | ΚΔΧ | 1987 | National | NALFO | Latina | | Active | |
| **Kappa Delta Kappa** | ΚΔΚ | 1938 | Local | Ursinus College | Traditional | | Active | |
| **Kappa Kappa Gamma** | ΚΚΓ | 1870 | International | NPC | Traditional | | Active | |
| **Kappa Lambda Iota** | ΚΛΙ | 1869 | Local | McKendree University | Traditional | | Active | (Note: Originally called the Clionian Literary Society.) |
| **Kappa Phi Delta** | ΚΦΔ | 1904 | Local | Illinois Institute of Technology | Traditional | | Active | |
| **Kappa Phi Lambda** | ΚΦΛ | 1995 | National | NAPA | Asian | Fraternte Servitium Varietas, 'Sisterhood, Service, Diversity' | Active | |
| Kappa Sigma Tau | ΚΣΤ | 1922–1923 | Regional | Independent | Traditional | | Inactive | |
| Lambda Omega | ΛΩ | 1915–1933 | National | NPC | Traditional | | Inactive | (Note: Merged with Delta Zeta.) |
| **Lambda Pi Chi** | ΛΠΧ | 1988 | National | NALFO | Latina | | Active | |
| **Lambda Pi Upsilon** | ΛΠΥ | 1992 | National | NALFO | Latina | | Active | |
| Lambda Psi Delta | ΛΨΔ | 1997 | National | NMGC | Multicultural | | Inactive ? | |
| **Lambda Sigma Gamma** | ΛΣΓ | 1986 | Regional | NMGC | Multicultural | | Active | |
| **Lambda Tau Omega** | ΛΤΩ | 1988 | National | NMGC | Multicultural | | Active | |
| **Lambda Theta Alpha** | ΛΘΑ | 1975 | National | NALFO | Latina | | Active | |
| **Lambda Theta Nu** | ΛΘΝ | 1986 | National | NALFO | Latina | | Active | |
| **Mu Alpha Phi** | ΜΑΦ | 1927 | Regional | CIPFI | Puerto Rican | | Active | |
| **Mu Sigma Upsilon** | ΜΣΥ | 1981 | National | NMGC | Multicultural | Mujeres Siempre Unidas, 'Women Always United' | Active | |
| **Omega Phi Beta** | ΩΦΒ | 1989 | National | NALFO | Multicultural | | Active | |
| **Omega Phi Chi** | ΩΦΧ | 1988 | National | NMGC | Multicultural | | Active | |
| Phi Alpha Chi | ΦΑΧ | 1925 | National | Independent | Traditional | | Inactive | |
| **Phi Alpha Mu** | ΦΑΜ | 1926 | Local | McDaniel College | Traditional | | Active | |
| **Phi Beta Chi** | ΦΒΧ | 1978 | National | Independent | Lutheran | Amor Via Vitae in Christo, 'Love through Life in Christ' | Active | |
| Phi Delta | ΦΔ | 1919 | National | Independent | Traditional | | Inactive | |
| Phi Mu Gamma | ΦΜΓ | 1921 | National | | Traditional, junior | | Inactive | |
| **Phi Kappa Pi** (aka Alpha Clionian ) | ΦΚΠ | 1872 | Local | SUNY Geneseo | Traditional | | Active | (Note: Was formed as Alpha Clionian literary society. It began using the Greek letters Phi Kappa Pi c. 1902, but still uses the name Alpha Clio.) |
| **Phi Mu** | ΦΜ | 1852 | National | NPC | Traditional | Les Soeurs Fideles, 'The Faithful Sisters' | Active | |
| **Phi Sigma Rho** | ΦΣΡ | 1984 | National | Independent | Engineering | | Active | |
| **Phi Sigma Sigma** | ΦΣΣ | 1913 | National | NPC | Traditional | Διωκετε Υψηλα, 'Aim high' | Active | |
| **Pi Alpha Gamma** | ΠΑΓ | 2011 | Local | St. Thomas University and University of New Brunswick | Traditional | | Active | |
| **Pi Beta Phi** | ΠΒΦ | 1867 | International | NPC | Traditional | | Active | |
| Pi Delta Kappa | ΠΔΚ | 1907–1913 | Regional | Independent | Traditional | | Inactive | (Note: Merged with Chi Omega.) |
| Pi Kappa Sigma | ΠΚΣ | 1894–1959 | International | NPC | Traditional | | Inactive | (Note: Merged with Sigma Kappa.) |
| Pi Lambda Sigma | ΠΛΣ | 1921–1952 | National | Independent | Traditional | | Inactive | (Note: Merged with Theta Phi Alpha.) (Note: This is the Catholic women's general sorority, not the former local honor society for library science at Syracuse, now a part of Beta Phi Mu.) |
| Phi Omega Pi | ΦΩΠ | 1922–1946 | National | NPC | Traditional | | Inactive | (Note: Merged with Delta Zeta.) |
| Pi Sigma Gamma | ΠΣΓ | 1919–1932 | National | NPC | Traditional | | Inactive | (Note: Merged with Beta Sigma Omicron.) |
| **Psi Lambda Xi** | ΨΛΞ | 2007 | Local | DePauw University | Traditional | | Active | |
| **Sigma Alpha Epsilon Pi** | ΣΑΕΠ | 1998 | National | Independent | Jewish | | Active | |
| **Sigma Alpha Omega** | ΣΑΩ | 1998 | National | Independent | Christian | | Active | |
| **Sigma Beta** | ΣΒ | January 18, 1907 | Local | University of Olivet | Traditional | | Active | |
| Sigma Delta Chi | ΣΔΧ | 1902–1915 | Regional | Independent | Traditional | | Inactive | (Note: Merged with Sigma Sigma Sigma.) |
| **Sigma Delta Tau** | ΣΔΤ | 1917 | International | NPC | Jewish | Patriae Multae Spes Una, 'One Hope of Many People' | Active | (Note: Originally a Jewish sorority.) |
| **Sigma Gamma Rho** | ΣΓΡ | 1922 | International | NPHC | African-American | | Active | |
| **Sigma Iota Alpha** | ΣΙΑ | 1990 | National | NALFO | Latina | Semper Unum et Inseparabilis, 'Always One and Inseparable' | Active | |
| Sigma Iota Chi | ΣΙΧ | 1903 | National | JPHC | Traditional, junior | Deus, Libertas, Lex | Inactive | |
| **Sigma Kappa** | ΣΚ | 1874 | National | NPC | Traditional | | Active | |
| **Sigma Lambda Alpha** | ΣΛΑ | 1992 | National | Independent | Latina | | Active | |
| **Sigma Lambda Gamma** | ΣΛΓ | 1990 | National | Independent | Latina | | Active | |
| **Sigma Lambda Upsilon** | ΣΛΥ | 1987 | National | NALFO | Latina | | Active | |
| **Sigma Omicron Epsilon** | ΣΟΕ | 1997 | National | Independent | Native American | | Active | |
| **Sigma Omicron Pi** | ΣΟΠ | 1930 | National | NAPA | Asian American | | Active | |
| Sigma Phi Beta | ΣΦΒ | 1920–1933 | National | NPC | Traditional | | Inactive | (Note: Merged with Phi Omega Pi.) |
| **Sigma Phi Lambda** | ΣΦΛ | 1988 | National | Independent | Christian | | Active | |
| **Sigma Phi Omega** | ΣΦΩ | 1949 | National | Independent | Asian | | Active | |
| **Sigma Pi Alpha** | ΣΠΑ | 1996 | National | Independent | Chicana/Latina | | Active | |
| **Sigma Psi** | ΣΨ | 1897-2024 | Local | Case Western Reserve University | Traditional | | Inactive | |
| **Sigma Psi Zeta** | ΣΨΖ | 1994 | National | NAPA | Asian American | | Active | |
| Sigma Sigma Delta | ΣΣΔ | 1924 | National | Independent | Traditional | | Inactive | |
| Sigma Sigma Omicron | ΣΣΟ | 1920 | National | Independent | Traditional | | Inactive | |
| **Sigma Sigma Sigma** | ΣΣΣ | 1898 | International | NPC | Traditional | Πιστός εϊς θάνατον, 'Faithful Unto Death' | Active | (Note: Originally an educational sorority) |
| **Tau Mu Tau** | ΤΜΤ | 1904 | Local | Gustavus Adolphus College | Traditional | | Active | |
| **Theta Nu Xi** | ΘΝΞ | 1997 | National | NMGC | Multicultural | | Active | |
| **Theta Phi Alpha** | ΘΦΑ | 1912 | National | NPC | Traditional | Θήτα φι Αλφα | Active | (Note: Originally a Catholic sorority) |
| Theta Sigma Upsilon | ΘΣΥ | 1921–1959 | National | NPC, PFA | Traditional | | Inactive | (Note: Merged with Alpha Gamma Delta.) |
| Theta Tau Epsilon | ΘΤΕ | 1921–19xx ? | National | JPHC, NPC | Traditional, junior | | Inactive | |
| Theta Upsilon | ΘΥ | 1921–1962 | National | NPC | Traditional | | Inactive | (Note: Merged with Delta Zeta.) |
| **Zeta Chi Epsilon** | ΖΧΕ | 2011 | Local | Ferrum College | Traditional | | Active | |
| **Zeta Chi Phi** | ΖΧΦ | 2003 | National | Independent | Multicultural | | Active | |
| Zeta Mu Epsilon | ΖΜΕ | 1921 | National | JPHC | Traditional | | Inactive | |
| **Zeta Phi Beta** | ΖΦΒ | 1920 | International | NPHC | African-American | παντα ἐργασία νίκα, 'Labor Always Wins' | Active | |
| **Zeta Sigma Chi** | ΖΣΧ | 1991 | National | Independent | Multicultural | Keeping the dream alive | Active | |
| **Zeta Tau Alpha** | ΖΤΑ | 1898 | International | NPC | Traditional | Ζητα Ταυ Αλφα | Active | |

== Coeducational sororities and fraternities ==
Coeducational fraternities permit both male and female members.

== See also ==
- College fraternities and sororities
- List of social fraternities
- Cultural interest fraternities and sororities
- Fraternities and sororities in Canada
- List of fraternities and sororities in France
- List of fraternities and sororities in the Philippines
- List of fraternities and sororities in Puerto Rico
- Professional fraternities and sororities
- Service fraternities and sororities
