= Sigma Sigma Sigma =

North American collegiate sorority

- ΣΣΣ
- Founded: April 20, 1898; 128 years ago Longwood University
- Type: Social
- Affiliation: NPC
- Former affiliation: PPA; AES
- Status: Active
- Scope: National (US)
- Motto: "Faithful Unto Death"
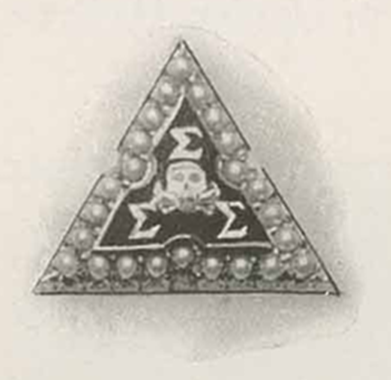
- Member badge
- Colors: Royal purple and white
- Symbol: Sailboat
- Flower: Purple violet
- Jewel: Pearl
- Publication: The Triangle of Sigma Sigma Sigma
- Philanthropy: The Sigma Sigma Sigma Foundation and March of Dimes
- Chapters: 103 collegiate 82 alumnae
- Members: 140,000+ lifetime
- Nickname: Tri Sigma, Sigma
- Headquarters: 1506 E. Franklin Street, Suite 300; Chapel Hill, North Carolina 27514; United States
- Website: www.trisigma.org

Sigma Sigma Sigma (ΣΣΣ), also known as Tri Sigma, is a national American women's sorority. It was established in 1898 at what is now Longwood University in Farmville, Virginia.The sorority's membership includes more than 140,000 women, hosts chapters on more than 100 college campuses, and maintains over 90 alumnae chapters. Sigma Sigma Sigma is a member of the National Panhellenic Conference.

== History ==
The State Female Normal School in Farmville, Virginia (now known as Longwood University) was the state's first institution to open its doors to teacher education. Eight students, Margaret Batten, Louise Davis, Martha Trent Featherston, Isabella Merrick, Sallie Michie, Lelia Scott, Elizabeth Watkins, and Lucy Wright founded the sorority in 1898. Scott and Wright led the first meetings of their secret society, the S.S.S. Club, in 1897. On April 20, 1898, these women officially announced the founding of the Greek letter society known as Sigma Sigma Sigma (Tri Sigma).

At the same time, Wright's roommate, Julia Tyler, was working to found Kappa Delta sorority. In the fall of 1898, Zeta Tau Alpha was founded, followed by the founding of Alpha Sigma Alpha in 1901. These four sororities were all founded at the State Female Normal School and were henceforth referred to as the "Farmville Four".

Tri Sigma was chartered with the Commonwealth of Virginia on February 12, 1903. Tri Sigma's first constitution, the Alpha chapter, was adopted in April 1903. A second chapter, Beta, was established at the Lewisburg Female Institute in 1903. In 1907, Tri Sigma had 100 active members and 250 total initiates from eight chapters. It also had two alumnae chapters. That year, the sorority decided to limit its chapters to colleges and closed Beta, Eta, and Theta.

In 1911, it decided to became a professional sorority and limited its chapters to normal schools. Chapters that did not fit were absorbed by Delta Delta Delta. Tri Sigma joined the Association of Education Sororities. In 1915, Tri Sigma absorbed the two remaining chapters of Sigma Delta Chi sorority. As the sorority grew, the national nature of Tri Sigma solidified with the standardization of a ceremony for new members and the establishment of a Founder's Day to celebrate the founding of Sigma Sigma Sigma. By 1930, it had chartered 32 chapters and had initiated 4,043 members.

Once a sorority exclusively for teachers and educational colleges, Tri Sigma became a social sorority. In 1951, Sigma Sigma Sigma became a full member of the National Panhellenic Conference. Sigma Sigma Sigma was the first NPC sorority to adopt a position statement for gender inclusivity. It now counts more than 140,000 women as members.

== Symbols ==
The Sigma Sigma Sigma motto is "Faithful Unto Death". Its colors are royal purple and pure white. The pearl was designated as the official jewel in 1909. The official flower is the purple violet. The sailboat is the official symbol. Its publication is The Triangle of ΣΣΣ.

The coat-of-arms came into use in 1902, designed by Harriet Henkins of the Alpha chapter. All the symbols on the shield may be used for jewelry, recognition pins, stationery, and formal clothing. From the upper left to lower right is the "bar" or "band" displaying the Greek letters "ΣΣΣ" Above the band in the right third are spreading wings joined by a centered circle, and above these is an equilateral triangle on which is engraved a single Sigma. Below the wings are clasped hands and in the lower left third is a flaming urn. On the banner below the shield are the words in Greek of the sorority's open motto, "Faithful Unto Death".

Adopted in 1903, the badge of the sorority is an equilateral gold triangle bordered with pearls, with a small semi circular indentation on each side. On the triangle is a raised black enamel triangle bearing the Greek letter "Σ" in gold on each corner. In the center of the badge is a skull and crossbones. The new member pin is a silver triangle, with the Greek letter "Σ" in each corner, on three arches or a circle.

== Philanthropy ==
The Sigma Sigma Sigma Foundation is a non-profit corporation formed in 1992. It distributes funds for charitable, educational, and miscellaneous purposes, including programs that support women's leadership, student grants and scholarships, and play therapy programs for hospitalized children. The organization centers its latter philanthropic efforts around the theme "Sigma Serves Children", specifically through the Robbie Page Memorial (RPM).

On September 15, 1951, Robbie Page, the son of Tri Sigma's National President, died of bulbar polio, a disease which at that time had no cure or vaccine; this death prompted his parents to establish a memorial fund in his honor. The sorority adopted this fund as its official philanthropy in 1954. In its early years, the RPM supported various polio research projects, including the Salk vaccine trials. It now focuses on supporting play therapy for hospitalized children and providing support for playrooms, libraries, and programs for children undergoing long-term hospital care.

Current national efforts are centered in funding fellowships at the Children's Medical Center in Dallas, Texas, and in funding graduate assistantships at the University of North Carolina Hospitals in Chapel Hill, North Carolina. At UNC, the sorority also funds the Robbie Page Play Atrium. The National Therapeutic Recreation Society has recognized Sigma Sigma Sigma for their support of Child Life and Play Therapy Programs. In 2016, Sigma Sigma Sigma added the March of Dimes as a national philanthropic partner.

== Governance ==
The sorority's headquarters is in Chapel Hill, North Carolina. The sorority currently holds conventions every three years at various locations.

== Chapters ==
Sigma Sigma Sigma has chapters on more than 100 college campuses, and maintains over 90 alumnae chapters.

== Notable members ==
Name	Original chapter	Notability	Ref.
Kristin Corrado	Epsilon Eta	New Jersey state senator	
Calli Cox	Alpha Psi	Former pornographic actress	
Linda Denham	Kappa	Creator of Care Bears	
Gabbie Hanna	Beta Theta	YouTuber, Viner, singer and comedian	
Lauren Holt	Epsilon Nu	Actress, comedian, and former cast member on Saturday Night Live	
Billie Letts	Beta Xi	Author of Where the Heart Is	
Taylor Lyles	Epsilon Pi	Technology Journalist for IGN	
Mary Rhodes Russell	Mu	Supreme Court of Missouri judge	
Carrie Underwood	Alpha Iota	Singer-songwriter, Grammy Award winner, winner of American Idol season four	

== See also ==
- List of social sororities and women's fraternities
