= Alpha Pi Omega =

Native American collegiate sorority

- ΑΠΩ
- Founded: September 1, 1994; 31 years ago University of North Carolina-Chapel Hill
- Type: Social
- Affiliation: Independent
- Status: Active
- Emphasis: Native American
- Scope: National
- Motto: "My Sister As Myself"
- Colors: Fire red, New Grass green and Maize yellow
- Flower: Dogwood
- Tree: Cedar
- Jewel: Amethyst
- Mascot: Queen Bee
- Chapters: 12 (active collegiate), 14 (graduate)
- Colonies: 6 (collegiate), 1 (graduate)
- Website: www.alphapiomega.org

Alpha Pi Omega Sorority, Inc. (ΑΠΩ) is the oldest historically Indigenous national sorority in the United States. It is the largest Indigenous Greek letter organization, with 26 chartered chapters across nine states and the District of Columbia.

== History ==
Alpha Pi Omega Sorority was founded on Sept. 1, 1994, at the University of North Carolina-Chapel Hill by four Native women. The founders, now known to as the Four Winds, are Shannon Brayboy (Lumbee), Jamie Goins (Lumbee), Amy Locklear (Lumbee and Coharie), and Christie Strickland (Lumbee). Before forming the group, they sought and received the approval of elder women from the various tribes of North Carolina.

The sorority's founding principles are traditionalism, spirituality, education, and contemporary issues. The sorority was incorporated with the State of North Carolina in 1995 and expanded to additional campuses.

With more than 130 tribes, bands and Indigenous communities represented among its members, the sorority has more than 1,000 sisters nationwide. Nationally, the sorority is governed by a thirteen-member board known as the Grand Keepers of the Circle. Grand Keepers are elected to two-year terms and meet bi-monthly.

== Symbols ==
The sorority's colors are fire red, new grass green, and maize yellow. Its mascot is the Queen Bee, while its jewel is the amethyst. Its tree is the cedar and its flower is the dogwood. The Alpha Pi Omega motto is "My Sister As Myself".

== Activities ==
Alpha Pi Omega preserves Native American traditions by celebrating and practicing cultural and spiritual heritage, such as hosting stickball games. At the same time, it supports a network for college students and professionals in modern society. The sorority's annual national convention is called the Grand Gathering.

Its permanent national philanthropy is the National Indian Education Association, as of 2010. Individual chapters also participate in local fundraising events such as Walk a Mile in Her Shoes or Remember the 10 Run. The Washington State University chapter held sexual assault awareness classes and LGBTQ+ ally training, while the Oregon State University chapter held a fundraiser for the Humane Society.

== Membership ==
Interested women may join at the undergraduate or post-undergraduate level. Collegiate women must have completed at least one full-time academic term, have a 2.5 GPA or higher, and have no previous affiliation with any social sorority. Women interested in joining a professional chapter must have completed a bachelor's degree or higher and have no previous affiliation with any social sorority.

== Chapters ==
Chapters are chartered at the sorority's annual Grand Gathering.

=== Undergraduate chapters ===
APO starts potential chapters as expansion sites. After a year, the expansion chapter becomes a provisional chapter. Following is a list of Alpha Pi Omega collegiate chapters. Active chapters are indicated in bold. Inactive chapters are shown in italic.

| Chapter | Charter date and range | Institution | Location | Status | Ref. |
|---|---|---|---|---|---|
| **Alpha** | September 1, 1994 | University of North Carolina-Chapel Hill | Chapel Hill, North Carolina | Active | |
| **Beta** | November 27, 1997 | University of North Carolina at Pembroke | Pembroke, North Carolina | Active | |
| **Gamma** | May 29, 2004 | Oklahoma State University–Stillwater | Stillwater, Oklahoma | Active | (Note: Founded as an expansion chapter in November 2002.) |
| Delta | May 28, 2005 | University of New Mexico | Albuquerque, New Mexico | Inactive | |
| Epsilon | May 27, 2006 | Dartmouth College | Hanover, New Hampshire | Inactive | |
| Zeta | May 27, 2006 | University of Arizona | Tucson, Arizona | Inactive | |
| **Eta** | June 2, 2007 | North Carolina State University | Raleigh, North Carolina | Active | |
| **Theta** | June 2, 2007 | Northeastern State University | Tahlequah, Oklahoma | Active | |
| **Iota** | June 8, 2008 | Arizona State University | Tempe, Arizona | Active | (Note: Started as a provisional chapter in May 2007.) |
| Kappa | July 14, 2013 | Oregon State University | Corvallis, Oregon | Inactive | |
| Lambda | July 12, 2014 | University of Wisconsin–Madison | Madison, Wisconsin | Active | |
| **Mu** | July 9, 2016 - 201x ? | Haskell Indian Nations University | Lawrence, Kansas | Inactive | (Note: Started as an expansion chapter in April 2010.) |
| **Nu** | July 11, 2020 | Duke University | Durham, North Carolina | Active | |
| Xi | July 11, 2020 | Washington State University | Pullman, Washington | Inactive | (Note: Established as a provisional chapter March 30, 2018.) |
| | | University of Northern Colorado | Greeley, Colorado | Honey Process | |
| | | Boston Citywide (Harvard University, Northeastern University, Wellesley College) | Boston, Massachusetts | Honey Process | |
| | | Western Carolina University | Cullowhee, North Carolina | Honey Process | |
| | | University of Kansas | Lawrence, Kansas | Honey Process | |
| | | University of North Dakota | Grand Forks, North Dakota | Honey Process | |
| | | University of North Carolina at Greensboro | Greensboro, North Carolina | Honey Process | |

=== Graduate chapters ===
Graduate chapters are for women who have received their undergraduate degrees. Following is a list of graduate chapters. Active chapters are indicated in bold. Inactive chapters are shown in italic.

| Name | Charter date | Location | Status | Ref. |
|---|---|---|---|---|
| **Alpha Pi** | September 1, 1994 | The Triangle, North Carolina | Active | |
| **Beta Pi** | November 27, 1996 | Robeson County, North Carolina | Active | |
| Gamma Pi | May 29, 2004 | Columbus County, North Carolina | Inactive | |
| **Delta Pi** | May 28, 2005 | Payne County, Oklahoma | Active | |
| **Epsilon Pi** | July 13, 2013 | Bernalillo County, New Mexico | Active | |
| Zeta Pi | July 13, 2013 | Washington, D.C. | Inactive | |
| Eta Pi | July 12, 2014 – 20xx ? | Pima County, Arizona | Inactive | |
| **Theta Pi** | July 11, 2015 | Oklahoma County, Oklahoma | Active | |
| **Iota Pi** | July 14, 2018 | Cherokee County, Oklahoma | Active | |
| **Kappa Pi** | July 10, 2021 | Rocky Mount, North Carolina | Active | |
| **Lambda Pi** | July 15, 2023 | Twin Cities (Minneapolis–Saint Paul) | Active | |
| **Mu Pi** | July 12, 2025 | Maricopa County, Arizona (Maricopa County, Arizona) | Active | |
| | | Dane County, Wisconsin | Honey Process | |

== See also ==
- Cultural interest fraternities and sororities
- List of social sororities and women's fraternities
- Phi Sigma Nu fraternity
