= Clovia (sorority) =

American collegiate sorority

- Founded: September 7, 1931; 95 years ago Kansas State University
- Type: Service and Social
- Affiliation: Independent
- Status: Active
- Emphasis: 4-H
- Scope: Regional
- Colors: Shamrock Green and White
- Symbol: Shamrock
- Philanthropy: 4-H, FFA
- Chapters: 2 active, 6 installed
- Headquarters: 2067 Carter Avenue; St. Paul, Minnesota 55108; United States

Clovia is an American women's cooperative leadership house founded at Kansas State University in 1931. It was originally formed as an affordable living group for 4-H alumnae attending the university.

== History ==
In 1930, a group of former 4-H members, women who had enrolled at the school now known as Kansas State University, met often for friendship and the continuation of relationships they shared from their years in 4-H. The following summer, in 1931, plans began in earnest to create an organization for themselves and similar collegians who had a 4-H affinity with the aim of teaching cooperative living and providing mutual support. They secured a home near campus to live in and determined a name for the new group, with the organizing meeting held on September 7, 1931.

The founders were Wilma Cook Creed, Lucille Nagel Fredrickson, Emma Manchester Meyer, Mary Landvardt Peterson, Mary Jordan Regnier, Jessie Dean Thackeray, and Ellen Blair Welsh.

From the beginning, Clovia's mission was established with the following four principles:

- To bind together all our members in a sincere and enduring sisterhood and to promote a spirit of sociability and good fellowship among the 4-H women students at Kansas State University
- To bring out the best qualities in one another through precept, example, and friendly criticism
- To lend one another every honorable means of assistance and encouragement throughout life
- To provide happy, adequate, and economical living conditions for all our members

Clovia expanded with the addition of a similarly-themed chapter at the University of Minnesota, called Sigma Phi Eta, joining in 1937. In 1939 this chapter formalized a name change by becoming the Beta chapter of Clovia, with its parent chapter adopting the name of Alpha chapter, and the National Association of Clovia was formed. Four additional chapters have been formed in the decades since that start.

The cooperative nature of Clovia distinguishes it from Greek Letter Organizations. Under the guidance of a housemother and alumnae advisors, members operate the house themselves, with shared duties including meal preparation, cleaning, maintenance, accounting, and new member recruitment. The cooperative model is more cost-effective than competing dorms, social sororities, or other living arrangements.

Each of the two surviving chapters manages its affairs directly with a shared history. Both have chapter homes that are owned by their alumni associations. Annual national meetings are held on a rotating basis. Both chapters participate in campus activities as associate university groups.

== Symbols ==
Mary Jordan Regnier was the designer of the Clovia crest and its official pin. The name, Clovia, was a suggestion from a Kansas State professor of the Greek language. Clovia is a Greek word for the clover plant. The sorority's colors are shamrock green and white.

== Philanthropy ==
Both chapters of Clovia support local philanthropies.

== Chapters ==
Six chapters of Clovia were formed. As a naming convention, chapters were consistently referenced by both their chapter designation and the name of the national organization, thus Alpha of Clovia, Beta of Clovia, Gamma of Clovia, etc. Two chapters remain active. Active chapters are noted in bold, inactive chapters are in italics.

Chapter	Charter date and range	Institution	Location	Status	Ref.
**Alpha of Clovia**	September 7, 1931	Kansas State University	Manhattan, Kansas	Active	(Note: A 1963 restoration of Delta Zeta's Lambda chapter sprang from this Clovia group, but that the Delta Zeta chapter again went dormant in 1976, per the Almanac of Fraternities and Sororities.)
**Beta of Clovia**	May 7, 1939	University of Minnesota	Saint Paul, Minnesota	Active	(Note: This chapter was organized as Sigma Phi Eta (local) in 1937 after a positive introduction to the KSU group. At this time, it became the Clovia Club. Two years later, it was installed as a chapter.)
Gamma of Clovia	February 7, 1954 – 1955	University of Nebraska	Lincoln, Nebraska	Inactive	
Delta of Clovia	February 25, 1968 – 1976	Minnesota State University	Mankato, Minnesota	Inactive	
Epsilon of Clovia	February 26, 1977 – 1994	Fort Hays State University	Hays, Kansas	Inactive	
Zeta of Clovia	March 8, 2003 – 2007	University of Minnesota Crookston	Crookston, Minnesota	Inactive	

== Alumnae society ==
The surviving chapters have active alumni associations.

== See also ==
- List of social sororities and women's fraternities
