= Kappa Sigma Tau =

American women's fraternity (1922–1932)

- ΚΣΤ
- Founded: April 1922; 104 years ago Northwestern University
- Type: Social
- Affiliation: Independent
- Status: Merged
- Merge date: 1932
- Successor: Alpha Xi Delta
- Scope: Regional
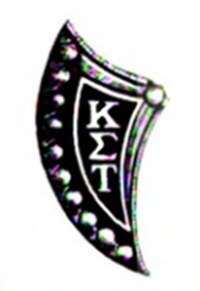
- Member badge
- Colors: Gold and White
- Symbol: Crescent
- Flower: Yellow rose
- Publication: The Gold and White
- Chapters: 4
- Members: 100+ lifetime
- Headquarters: United States

Kappa Sigma Tau (ΚΣΤ) was an American college women's fraternity that was established in 1922 at Northwestern University in Evanston, Illinois. It had four chapters in Illinois and Mississippi before merging with Alpha Xi Delta in 1932.

== History ==
Kappa Sigma Tau was established in April 1922 at Northwestern University in Evanston, Illinois. The women's fraternity originated from the Campus Club, an independent women's group that was established before World War I, but went inactive during the war. Campus Club attempted to reform in 1919, but its members decided that the Y.W.C.A. was an adequate substitute.

In April 1922, the group reformed as the Kahniga women's fraternity, but changed its name to Kappa Sigma Tau later that year. Its 1922 founders were Dorothy Benellack, Mae Benson, Dorothy Bonar, Violet Burchwood, Florence Carpenter, Dorothy Dodge, Margaret Fisher, Maurine Gahagen, Mildred Garmine, Wilma Helper, Alma Hook, Ruth Martin, Ester Olson, Irene Swensen, Louise Tanquary, Kathryn Taylor, Yvonne Torgerson, Grace Towle, Evelyn Van Vactor, Mildred Wahlberg, Francis Wiehl, and Rachel Wilson.

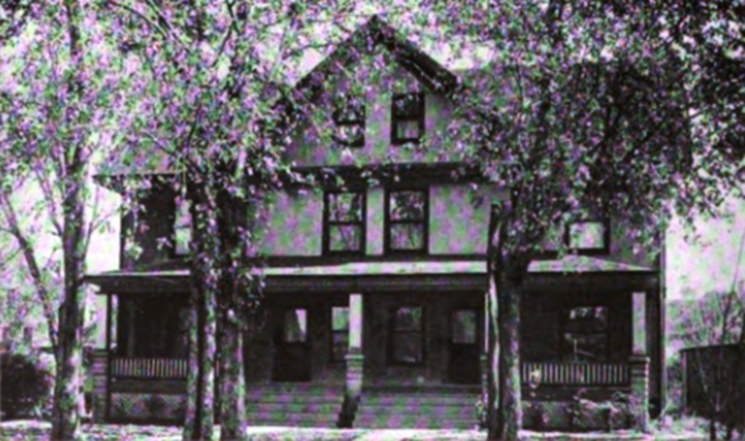
University of Illinois, chapter house at 908 South Fourth Street in Champaign, 1928

A second chapter, Beta, was established at the University of Illinois in 1924. In October 1924, Beta was admitted to the campus Pan-Hellenic Council. In the fall of 1925, the chapter moved into a house at 908 South Fourth Street in Champaign, previously used by Theta Kappa Phi. The Beta Chapter Alumni Association of Kappa Sigma Tau was incorporated on July 22, 1927, and was based in Champaign. A third chapter was chartered at the University of Mississippi in 1927, followed by a fourth chapter at Lake Forest College in 1928. In 1928, Beta purchased a lot in Urbana to build a house, renting 607 East Daniel Street in Champaign pending construction.

Chapter activities included a biennial formal, singing contests, and participating in campus intramural sports such as swimming and basketball. Kappa Sigma Tau was governed by a five-person national council that was elected at an annual convention. In June 1932, the national convention was held in the Buena Vista Hotel in Biloxi, Mississippi.

In 1932, the Kappa Sigma Tau merged with the national sorority Alpha Xi Delta. The merger took place under the instruction of the National Panhellenic Council which determined that the sorority system had over-expanded and would benefit from consolidation. Delta chapter merged on July 19, 1932, while Beta merged on August 8, 1932. Alpha chapter, at Northwestern, disbanded instead of merging. Gamma at the University of Mississippi withdrew and joined another national sorority. At the time of the merger, Beta chapter of Kappa Sigma Tau had 100 alumnae.

Kappa Sigma Tau is not affiliated with the local sorority of the same name that was established at McKendree University in 1992.

== Symbols ==
Kappa Sigma Tau's coat-of-arms was a shield featuring three stars, a pair of balances, and a lamp, with a crescent as the crest above the shield.

The fraternity's badge was a gold crescent with ten pearls on the left side, one pearl at the tip of the right side, and a raised onyx crescent in the center with the Greek letters in ΚΣΤ in gold. The fraternity's colors were gold and white. Its flower was the yellow rose. Its publication was The Gold and White.

== Chapters ==
In 1930, Kappa Sigma Tau's chapters were as follows.

Chapter	Charter date and range	Institution	Location	Status	Ref.
Alpha	April 1922–1932	Northwestern University	Evanston, Illinois	Inactive	(Note: The chapter formed from Kahniga women's fraternity, established in 1919 as the Campus Club. At the time of the merger with Alpha Xi Delta, this chapter disbanded.)
Beta	September 1924 – August 8, 1932	University of Illinois	Champaign, Illinois	Merged (ΑΞΔ)	(Note: The chapter formed from Tau Kappa (local). It merged into the Kappa chapter of Alpha Xi Delta with the national merger of the two sororities.)
Gamma	1927–1932	University of Mississippi	University, Mississippi	Withdrew	(Note: At the time of the merger with Alpha Xi Delta, this chapter withdrew and joined another national sorority.)
Delta	1928 – July 19, 1932	Lake Forest College	Lake Forest, Illinois	Merged (ΑΞΔ)	(Note: The chapter formed from Beta Sigma Iota (local). It became the Beta Zeta chapter of Alpha Xi Delta with the national merger of the two sororities.)

== See also ==
- List of social sororities and women's fraternities
