= Sigma Lambda Alpha (sorority) =

American Latina collegiate sorority

- ΣΛΑ
- Founded: October 20, 1992; 33 years ago Texas Woman's University
- Type: Social
- Affiliation: Independent
- Former affiliation: NALFO
- Status: Active
- Emphasis: cultural interest - Latina
- Scope: National
- Motto: "Latinas Helping Others"
- Pillars: Community service, Academic achievement, Cultural awareness, and Sisterhood
- Colors: Burgundy, Forest green, and Gold
- Flower: Red rose
- Jewel: Green topaz
- Mascot: Bald eagle
- Philanthropy: Boys & Girls Clubs of America
- Chapters: 8
- Colonies: 5
- Nicknames: Señoritas Latinas en Acción, SLA, Texas Señoritas
- Headquarters: SLA - National Board of Directors; P.O. Box #134; Denton, Texas 76202; United States
- Website: www.sigmalambdaalpha.org

Sigma Lambda Alpha Sorority, Inc. (ΣΛΑ) or Señoritas Latinas en Acción Sorority, Inc. is an American Latina based Greek-lettered sorority of college-educated women. Sigma Lambda Alpha Sorority, Inc. was founded in the summer of 1992, at Texas Woman's University in Denton, Texas, by Angeles Gonzalez and the help of five other young women. Sigma Lambda Alpha Sorority, Inc. is a Latina-founded organization and is open to all women regardless of race, nationality, or religion. The sorority is currently present in 12 campuses in Texas and Oklahoma. Though Latina-based, Sigma Lambda Alpha Sorority, Inc. is a non-discriminatory organization. The sorority is a former member of the National Association of Latino Fraternal Organizations (NALFO) and was the third former sororal member to have left the umbrella organization.

== History ==
=== Establishment ===
Sigma Lambda Alpha Sorority, Inc., otherwise known as Señoritas Latinas en Acción, was founded in the summer of 1992 by Angeles Gonzalez. As a student at Texas Woman's University, Gonzalez read an article in a Hispanic magazine about a national Hispanic sorority called Sigma Lambda Upsilon Upon reading this article, she realized that Latina Greek organizations were a cultural medium at universities. She became interested in forming an organization that would serve as a cultural outlet on her campus.

Gonzalez wrote to the sorority for more information regarding their organization and Latino Greeks in general. She promptly received a response and was advised to begin an interest group, elect officers, and choose an organizational name to start the sorority process. With the assistance of Director Linda Weber in the Office of Student Development and Robin Zaruba, assistant director of Activities and Orientation, Angeles Gonzalez began the process of establishing a Latina sorority at Texas Woman's University.

In the fall of 1992, Gonzalez began recruiting girls to be the “founding mothers” of the sorority and attend the first meeting. In this meeting, they discussed the goals of the organization, and elected officers and chose their organizational/interest group name. Sigma Lambda Alpha/Señoritas Latinas en Acción was founded on October 20, 1992, on the campus of Texas Woman's University in Denton, Texas.

With the interest group of Sigma Lambda Alpha established, excitement grew with the thought of having Latina representation at TWU, however, the sorority in Pennsylvania decided against beginning a chapter in Texas, because of the distance between the two states. Determined to have Hispanic representation at TWU, the founding mothers did not let this hinder the establishment of an organization. They chose to launch a new sorority based on their original group goals and combined beliefs. They elected to carry on the name of Sigma Lambda Alpha/Señoritas Latinas en Acción Inc. and created a sisterhood based on cultural awareness, community service, leadership, and academic achievement. The first pledge class of the Alpha chapter was inducted in the spring of 1993.

=== 21st century ===
In 2011, Sigma Lambda Alpha became the youngest member organization of the National Association of Latino Fraternal Organizations (NALFO). In 2015 however, after only four years within the umbrella organization and for reasons unknown to the public, it would become the fifth former member to leave NALFO.

Sigma Lambda Alpha's mission "is to promote the importance of community service involvement and academic achievement as well as to educate and excel the stance of Latino cultures in this diversely enriched society." The sorority would have its first chapter outside of the state of Texas chartered in 2016 with the establishment of the Theta chapter at Oklahoma State University. Its national headquarters is located in Denton, Texas.

== Symbols ==
The motto of Sigma Lambda Alpha is "Latinas Helping Others". The sorority's principles or pillars are Community service, Academic achievement, Cultural awareness, and Sisterhood. Its colors are burgundy, forest green, and gold. Its flower is the red rose. Its jewel is the green topaz. Its mascot is the bald eagle.

== Activities ==
The philanthropy of the sorority is the Boys & Girls Clubs of America. The mentoring program of Sigma Lambda Alpha is the ROSAS program.

== Chapters ==
Active chapters are indicated in bold. Inactive chapters are indicated in italics.

Chapter	Charter date and range	Institution	Location	Status	Ref.
Alpha	October 20, 1992	Texas Woman's University	Denton, Texas	Active	
Beta		Texas Christian University	Fort Worth, Texas	Active	
Gamma		Midwestern State University	Wichita Falls, Texas	Active	
Epsilon		University of Texas at San Antonio	San Antonio, Texas	Active	
Zeta		University of Texas at Dallas	Richardson, Texas	Active	
Eta		University of Texas at Austin	Austin, Texas	Active	
Theta	2016	Oklahoma State University–Stillwater	Stillwater, Oklahoma	Active	
Iota		University of Central Oklahoma	Oklahoma City, Oklahoma	Active	
Omega				Memorial	
TAMUC Associate		Texas A&M University-Commerce	Commerce, Texas	Associate	
UCO Associate		University of Central Oklahoma	Edmond, Oklahoma	Associate	
OCU Associate		Oklahoma City University	Oklahoma City, Oklahoma	Associate	
OU Associate		University of Oklahoma	Norman, Oklahoma	Associate	
UHCL Associate		University of Houston-Clear Lake	Houston, Texas	Associate	

== See also ==
- List of social sororities and women's fraternities
- Cultural interest fraternities and sororities
