= Sigma Lambda Upsilon =

American Latina collegiate sorority

- ΣΛΥ
- Founded: December 1, 1987; 38 years ago Binghamton University
- Type: Social
- Affiliation: NALFO
- Status: Active
- Emphasis: Cultural Interest - Latina
- Scope: National
- Motto: Hasta La Muerte "Until Death"
- Colors: Gold, Black, Silver, and Red
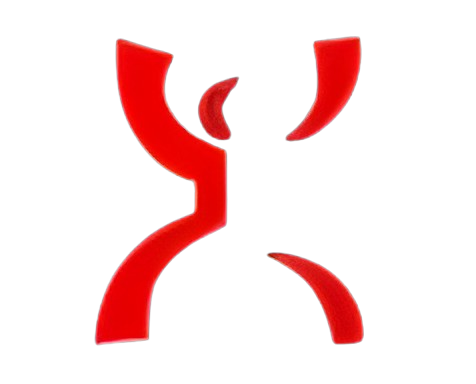
- Symbol: Sororal Symbol
- Flower: Red Pansy with Black and Gold
- Jewel: Black Pearl
- Mascot: Black Persian Cat with gold eyes
- Publication: The Spirit of Ella
- Philanthropy: Literacy
- Chapters: 44 undergraduate 18 graduate-professional
- Nickname: Señoritas Latinas Unidas, SLU, Sigma Lambdas, Señoritas
- Headquarters: Grand Central Station; P.O. Box 4170; New York, New York 10163; United States
- Website: sigmalambdaupsilon.org

Sigma Lambda Upsilon (ΣΛΥ) or Señoritas Latinas Unidas Sorority, Inc. is a Latina-based sorority founded on December 1, 1987 at Binghamton University. The organization was created to promote academic achievement and serve the Latino community and the campuses that Sigma Lambda Upsilon serves. The sorority is now present in over 65 campuses. Though Latina-based, Sigma Lambda Upsilon Sorority, Inc. is a non-discriminatory organization. The sorority is a member of the National Association of Latino Fraternal Organizations (NALFO) and is its fourth oldest sororal member by founding date.

== History ==
=== Origins ===
The sorority (like other Greek members within the National Association of Latino Fraternal Organizations) was founded during the post-1975 phase of the Latino Greek Movement which followed the "principio" (principle) stage initially kickstarted in 1898 by student activism on college campuses. The "fuerza" (force) wave of Greek-lettered Latino organizations in the 1980s would then begin as the result of many Latino students feeling they had to create a more favorable system of American higher education for Latino population within the country. This would be a much–talked–about issue during the time for social justice activists within the community as a result of the stagnant growth of Latino student enrollment during the 1980s through the early 1990s.

=== Establishment ===
The initial steps for the creation of Sigma Lambda Upsilon, Señoritas Latinas Unidas Sorority, Incorporated were taken in 1986 at Binghamton University. In this period of time, fellow NALFO Latino fraternal organization La Unidad Latina, Lambda Upsilon Lambda, Fraternity, Incorporated was considering being co-ed as the founding line of its Beta chapter included two women by the names of Carol Lasso and Vanina Gonzalez. Eventually, however, the decision was made amongst its members to keep Lambda Upsilon Lambda from that moment on, exclusive, to those who identified as male. The result of this decision would lead to the fraternity's Beta chapter coming up with its two female members, the concept of a sorority on-campus that would be able to unite the community's Latina women. Shortly afterward in December 1987, the founding line of the organization would be formed, with four women: Cynthia Santiago, Adriana Zamora, Carmen Ibeth Garcia-Quiñones, and Carol Elizabeth Torres, creating the Alpha chapter of Sigma Lambda Upsilon at the university, forming the first Latina-interest sorority on campus with their titles of "founding mothers". However, despite the support that Lambda Upsilon Lambda gave towards the founding of Sigma Lambda Upsilon, the two organizations are not constitutionally bound to one another.

The founding mothers, like many other founding lines for Latina Greek-lettered organizations during "fuerza" era, modeled their probate ceremony after that of Greek-lettered organizations in the National Pan-Hellenic Council like Alpha Kappa Alpha.

=== 20th century and NALFO ===
Throughout the 1990s, during the fragmentation phase of the Latino Greek Movement (which saw the creation and major expansion of many Latina Greek organizations), the sorority was chartered across 30 campuses in various states and established alumni associations in major cities such as Washington, D.C. In 1992, the sorority briefly considered expanding into Texas at the Texas Woman's University after being contacted by an undergraduate student in the summer of that year who was inspired by the sorority's philanthropic work at the University of Pennsylvania. Ultimately, the sorority decided against establishing a chapter at the university which would lead the student, Angeles Gonzalez, along with six other women, to establish the Alpha chapter of Sigma Lambda Alpha/Señoritas Latinas en Acción Sorority, Incorporated. Sigma Lambda Upsilon would later go onto charter the Theta Delta graduate chapter in the state.

It also joined the National Association of Latino Fraternal Organizations in 1998 and became one of two East Coast sororities, along with Omega Phi Beta, to join the majority West Coast and Mid-West conference instead of the majority East Coast ConcÌlio Nacional de Hermandades Latinas that year.

=== 21st century and lawsuit against the University of Virginia ===
In early 2019, the sorority was the figurehead of a notable debate highlighting what constitutes hazing and the challenges that colleges and universities face in enforcing anti-hazing policies. The Alpha Rho chapter of Sigma Lambda Upsilon at the University of Virginia was accused of violating the university's anti-hazing policy by requiring its members to complete mandatory study hours of at least 25 hours per week. This was met with the sorority's national organization filing a lawsuit against UVA, in which they argued that the mandatory study hours were not hazing and that the university's definition of hazing was too broad. The lawsuit also accused UVA of discrimination against the sorority because of its focus on serving the Latina community. Critics of UVA's decision to classify mandatory study hours as hazing included several writers and media outlets. The National Review published an article arguing that the lawsuit against Sigma Lambda Upsilon was a sign of the "hazing hysteria" that has taken hold on college campuses. The Washington Post and NBC News also reported on the controversy, highlighting the debate over what constitutes hazing and the controversy over UVA's decision to classify mandatory study hours as hazing. Kerry Dougherty, a local columnist in Virginia, also weighed in on the controversy, arguing that UVA was "making a mockery" of the anti-hazing policy by equating mandatory study hours with hazing.

In response to the lawsuit filed by Sigma Lambda Upsilon's national organization, UVA defended its anti-hazing policies and argued that the university's definition of hazing was consistent with that used by other colleges and universities. UVA also emphasized its commitment to promoting diversity and inclusion on campus, but argued that this commitment did not excuse violations of the university's policies. The case was ultimately settled out of court in 2019, with Sigma Lambda Upsilon agreeing to implement new anti-hazing policies and UVA agreeing to review its policies and procedures related to hazing.

In 2020, the sorority's chapter at Syracuse University notably managed to reach an endowment goal of $100,000 within two years despite having just initiated 77 members since its founding as the first Latina-based sorority on the campus.

== Symbols ==
The motto of Sigma Lambda Upsilon is Hasta La Muerte or "Until Death". Its colors are gold, red, black, and silver. Its jewel is the black pearl. Its mascot is the black Persian cat with gold eyes. Its symbol is the Sororal symbol. Its publication is The Spirit of Ella.

== Membership ==
Sigma Lambda Upsilon's membership is predominantly Latina and Hispanic American in composition. Members of the sorority are predominately from the United States, the Caribbean, and Latin America. Members refer to each other as Hermanas (translated as sister in the Spanish language). Additionally, they also refer to themselves as Señoritas (translated as ladies in Spanish) or Sigma Lambdas. Those undergoing the new membership education process are referred to as Damas (translated as ladies in Spanish).

The sorority offers three ways to obtain membership: through an undergraduate chapter, through an alumni professional chapter, or receiving honorary status. Undergraduate and alumni professional chapters have separate academic requirements and prerequisites for membership. Honorary membership is decided by the organization's national governing body.

== Activities ==
The mission of Sigma Lambda Upsilon/Señoritas Latinas Unidas Sorority, Inc. is to showcase that only the sorority can authentically provide an everlasting sisterhood and an empowering sense of pride to its diverse members by intentionally contributing tools to distinguish themselves. The sorority specifically seeks to meet this mission through its goals of fostering:

- Sisterhood
- Academic excellence
- Leadership
- Service to the community
- Cultural enrichment

The ideals of the sorority are sincerity, loyalty, and unity.

=== Philanthropy ===
Historically since 2000, the organization's philanthropy has been the promotion of literacy in accordance with the standards set by The United Nations Educational, Scientific and Cultural Organization (UNESCO). The sorority works with children and youth as its primary target population to aid in literacy in education and career success. The premise of their philanthropic work focuses on the power of literacy to uplift their communities and foster confidence in their young people, for them to advance toward their educational, personal, and professional goals.

=== Mentoring programs ===
Sigma Lambda Upsilon's national mentoring initiatives are the Leadership, Advancement, and Development of our Young Sisters (LADYS) and Promoting Education, the Arts, our Roots, Leadership and Service (PEARLS) programs.

=== National performance team ===
The sorority has a national performance team called Blacklisted. It participates in various traditional step and stroll shows and helps promote development opportunities for members to live a more active lifestyle through the fitness and wellness initiative "Fit for a Señorita".

=== Dates of celebration ===
- 2nd Sunday of June – Puerto Rican Day Parade
- September 15 – October 15 - National Hispanic Heritage Month
- December 1 – Founder's Day

== Chapters ==
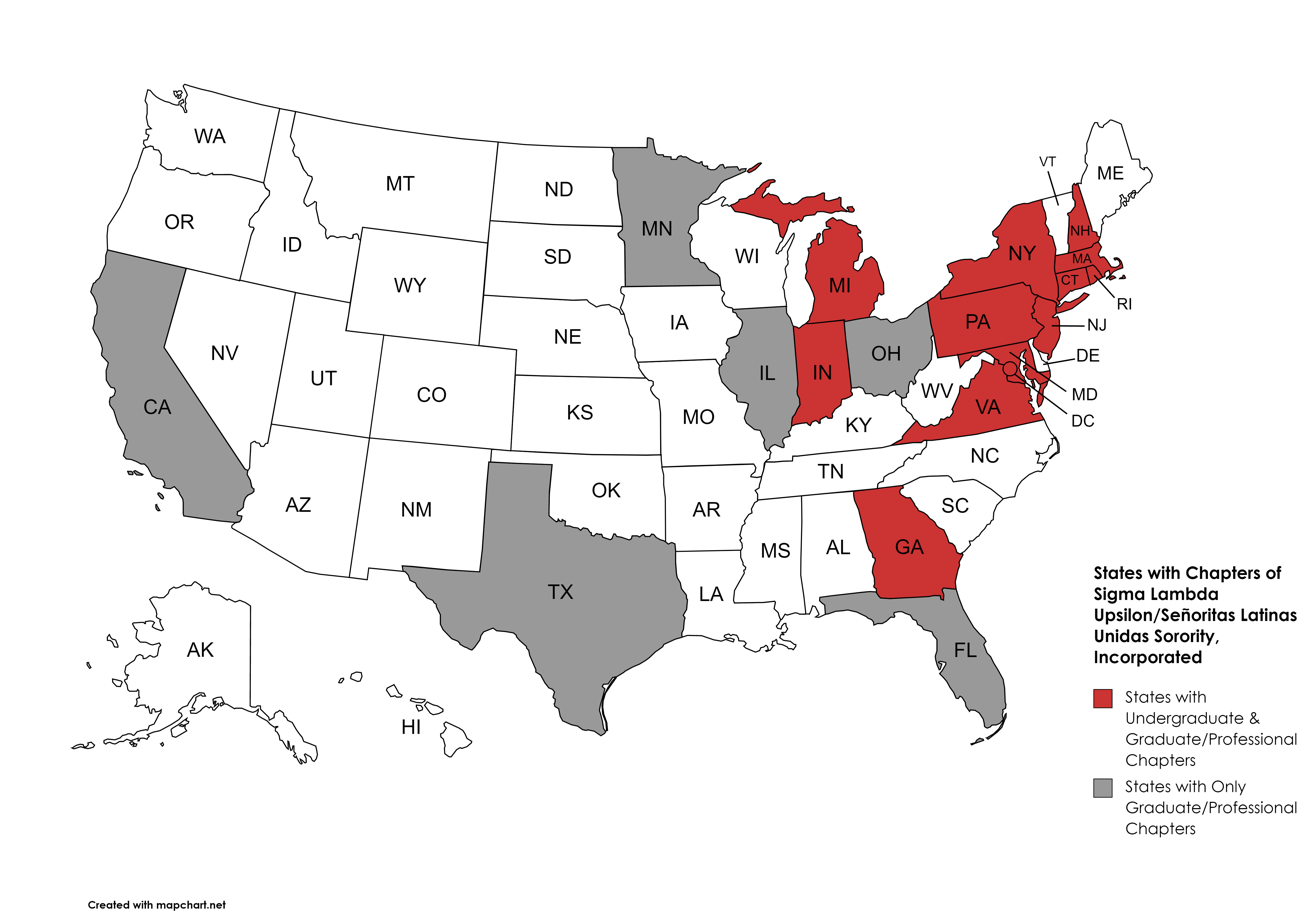
Sigma Lambda Upsilon locations

Sigma Lambda Upsilon has 44 active undergraduate chapters, eighteen active graduate chapters, and one designated memorial chapter for deceased members. Graduate chapters are open to alumnae as well as alumnae initiates.

== See also ==
- Cultural interest fraternities and sororities
- List of social sororities and women's fraternities
