= List of University of Texas at Austin fraternities and sororities =

The University of Texas at Austin is home to some sixty fraternity and sorority chapters. These chapters are under the authority of one of UT Austin's seven Greek council communities; most are connected to a national umbrella organization.

In the following list, active chapters are indicated in bold and inactive chapters are in italics.

Organization	Chapter	Charter date and range	Campus council	Type	Status	Ref.
Acacia	Texas Associate	1916–1933, 1947–1989, 1994–2000, 2006–2019	Interfraternity Council	Fraternity	Inactive	(Note: Chapter formed from the Triangle Club, established in 1914.)
**Alpha Chi Omega**	Alpha Phi	1924	University Panhellenic Council	Women's fraternity	Active	
Alpha Delta Gamma	Alpha Theta	2013–2015	Interfraternity Council	Fraternity	Inactive	
Alpha Delta Phi	Texas	1994–2002	Interfraternity Council	Fraternity	Inactive	
**Alpha Delta Pi**	Delta	1906	University Panhellenic Council	Sorority	Active	
Alpha Gamma Delta	Epsilon Delta	1940–1972, 1985–1996	University Panhellenic Council	Women's fraternity	Inactive	
**Alpha Epsilon Phi**	Omega	1925	University Panhellenic Council	Sorority	Active	
**Alpha Epsilon Pi**	Gamma Deuteron	1939–xxxx ?, 20xx ?	Interfraternity Council	Fraternity	Active	(Note: Chapter originally formed from the Esquires Club, established in 1938. After going dormant, it reformed as a colony in 2003.)
**Alpha Kappa Alpha**	Delta Xi	1959	National Pan-Hellenic Council	Sorority	Active	
**alpha Kappa Delta Phi**	Eta	1993	Texas Asian Pan-Hellenic Council	Sorority	Active	
Alpha Kappa Lambda	Alpha Pi	1967–1971, 1994–1998	Interfraternity Council	Fraternity	Inactive	
**Alpha Lambda Mu**	Kappa	2020		Fraternity	Active	
**Alpha Phi**	Omega	1920	University Panhellenic Council	Sorority	Active	(Note: Chapter formed from Delta Alpha, established in 1919.)
**Alpha Phi Alpha**	Epsilon Iota	1960	National Pan-Hellenic Council	Fraternity	Active	(Note: Chapter formed from Alpha Upsilon Tau, established in 1957.)
Alpha Psi Lambda	Sigma	2005–20xx ?	Latino Pan-Hellenic Council	Co-ed fraternity	Inactive	
Alpha Sigma Phi	Eta Eta	2015–2019	Interfraternity Council	Fraternity	Inactive	
**Alpha Sigma Rho**	Beta	2000	Texas Asian Pan-Hellenic Council	Service sorority	Active	
**Alpha Tau Omega**	Gamma Eta	1897–1986, 1992–2018 2025–Present	Interfraternity Council	Fraternity	Active	
**Alpha Xi Delta**	Beta Alpha	1929–1943, 1963	University Panhellenic Council	Women's fraternity	Active	(Note: Chapter formed from Phi Omega Upsilon, established in 1925.)
**Beta Chi Theta**	Eta	2003	Texas Asian Pan-Hellenic Council	Fraternity	Active	
Beta Kappa Gamma	Alpha	1999–20xx ?		Fraternity	Inactive	
**Beta Theta Pi**	Beta Omicron	1886–2010, 2018	Interfraternity Council	Fraternity	Active	
**Beta Upsilon Chi**	Alpha	1985	Interfraternity Council	Fraternity	Active	
**Chi Omega**	Iota	1904	University Panhellenic Council	Women's fraternity	Active	(Note: Chapter formed from Sigma Tau, established in 1903.)
**Chi Phi**	Nu	1892–1972, 1985–2013, 20xx ?	Interfraternity Council	Fraternity	Active	
**Chi Upsilon Sigma**	Beta Alpha	2009	Latino Pan-Hellenic Council	Sorority	Active	
**Delta Alpha Sigma**	Beta	2011	Multicultural Greek Council	Sorority	Active	
Delta Chi		1907–1970, 1989–2019	Interfraternity Council	Fraternity	Inactive	
**Delta Delta Delta**	Theta Zeta	1912	University Panhellenic Council	Women's fraternity	Active	(Note: Chapter formed from Sigma Alpha Chi, established in 1911.)
**Delta Epsilon Psi**	Founding chapter	1998	Texas Asian Pan-Hellenic Council	Fraternity	Active	
**Delta Gamma**	Beta Eta	1939	University Panhellenic Council	Sorority	Active	
Delta Kappa Delta	Gamma	2003 – 20xx ?	Texas Asian Pan-Hellenic Council	Sorority	Inactive	
Delta Kappa Epsilon	Omega Chi	1912–1971, 1976–2008	Interfraternity Council	Fraternity	Inactive	(Note: Chapter formed by absorbing the Capital Club (local), established in 1901.)
Delta Lambda Phi	Beta Rho	2010–20xx ?	Interfraternity Council	Fraternity	Inactive	
Delta Phi Epsilon	Chi	1934–1973, 1980–1990	University Panhellenic Council	Sorority	Inactive	
**Delta Phi Omega**	Epsilon	2002	Texas Asian Pan-Hellenic Council	Sorority	Active	
**Delta Sigma Phi**	Eta	1907–1932, 1939–1964, 1971	Interfraternity Council	Fraternity	Active	
**Delta Sigma Theta**	Epsilon Beta	1960	National Pan-Hellenic Council	Sorority	Active	
**Delta Tau Delta**	Gamma Iota	1904	Interfraternity Council	Fraternity	Active	
**Delta Upsilon**	Texas	1949–2000, 2017	Interfraternity Council	Fraternity	Active	(Note: Chapter formed from the 1834 Club, established in 1947.)
**Delta Xi Nu**	Upsilon	2001–20xx ?, 2021	Affiliate Leadership Circle	Sorority	Active	
Delta Zeta	Alpha Tau	1924–1931, 1939–1977	University Panhellenic Council	Sorority	Inactive	
**Gamma Beta**	Alpha	2000	Texas Asian Pan-Hellenic Council	Fraternity	Active	
Gamma Phi Beta	Alpha Zeta	1922–1988	University Panhellenic Council	Sorority	Inactive	
**Gamma Rho Lambda**	Tau	2015	Multicultural Greek Council	Sorority	Active	
**Kappa Alpha Order**	Omicron	1883–1887, 1891–2000, 201x ?	Interfraternity Council	Fraternity	Active	
**Kappa Alpha Psi**	Iota Delta	1977	University Panhellenic Council	Fraternity	Active	
**Kappa Alpha Theta**	Alpha Theta	1904	University Panhellenic Council	Sorority	Active	(Note: Chapter formed from Beta Epsilon, established in 1902.)
**Kappa Delta**	Sigma Epsilon	1921–1934, 1981	University Panhellenic Council	Sorority	Active	(Note: Chapter formed from Sigma Epsilon, established in 1919.)
**Kappa Delta Chi**	Pi	1998	Latino Pan-Hellenic Council	Sorority	Active	
**Kappa Kappa Gamma**	Beta Xi	1902	University Panhellenic Council	Women's fraternity	Active	(Note: Chapter formed from Sigma Sigma Sigma, established in 1898.)
**Kappa Phi Gamma**	Founding chapter	1998	Texas Asian Pan-Hellenic Council	Sorority	Active	
**Kappa Phi Lambda**	Alpha Gamma	2009	Texas Asian Pan-Hellenic Council	Sorority	Active	
**Kappa Sigma**	Tau	1884	Interfraternity Council	Fraternity	Active	
**Lambda Chi Alpha**	Alpha Mu	1917–1936, 1940–1995, 2001	Interfraternity Council	Fraternity	Active	(Note: Chapter originally formed by absorbing Sigma Phi Sigma, established in 1910.)
**Lambda Phi Epsilon**	Zeta	1989	Texas Asian Pan-Hellenic Council	Fraternity	Active	
**Lambda Theta Alpha**	Gamma Chi	2004	Affiliate Leadership Circle	Sorority	Active	
**Lambda Upsilon Lambda**	UT Austin Provisional	2023	Affiliate Leadership Circle	Fraternity	Active	
**Mu Delta Alpha**	Beta	2017	Multicultural Greek Council	Sorority	Active	
**Omega Delta Phi**	Chi	1998	Latino Pan-Hellenic Council	Fraternity	Active	
**Omega Phi Gamma**	Founding chapter	1995	Texas Asian Pan-Hellenic Council	Fraternity	Active	
**Omega Psi Phi**	Eta Theta	1969	National Pan-Hellenic Council	Fraternity	Active	
**Phi Beta Sigma**	Mu Rho	1981	National Pan-Hellenic Council	Fraternity	Active	
Phi Delta Theta	Texas Beta	1883–1997, 2000–2022	Interfraternity Council	Fraternity, secret society	Inactive	(Note: In 1886, this fraternity absorbed W.W.W. Rainbow which was established in 1883.. In 2000, it reformed from Texas B K (local), established in 1999.)
**Phi Gamma Delta**	Tau Deuteron	1883–1887, 1901	Interfraternity Council	Fraternity	Active	
Phi Iota Alpha	Alpha Xi	2011–20xx ?	Latino Pan-Hellenic Council	Fraternity	Inactive	
**Phi Kappa Psi**	Texas Alpha	1904	Interfraternity Council	Fraternity	Active	(Note: Formed by absorbing the campus chapter of Phi Phi Phi.)
**Phi Kappa Sigma**	Sigma	1941–1973, 1984–2000, 2013	Interfraternity Council	Fraternity	Active	
**Phi Kappa Tau**	Beta Alpha	1943–1971, 1982–1988, 2012	Interfraternity Council	Fraternity	Active	(Note: Chapter formed from Phi Theta Tau, established in 1942.)
Phi Kappa Theta	Texas Alpha Pi	1959–1970, 1976–1995, 2002–200x ?, 201x ?–2021	Interfraternity Council	Fraternity	Inactive	(Note: Chapter formed from the Catholic Club, established in 1956. In 2002, it reformed from Alpha Pi Rho (local), established in 1997.)
Phi Mu	Phi	1913–1965	University Panhellenic Council	Sorority	Inactive	
Phi Sigma Delta	Lambda	1920–1969	Interfraternity Council	Fraternity	Merged	(Note: Phi Sigma Delta merged with Zeta Beta Tau in 1970, retiring its original name.)
Phi Sigma Kappa	Theta Triton	1947–1976	Interfraternity Council	Fraternity	Inactive	
Phi Sigma Sigma	Tau	1929–1933	University Panhellenic Council	Sorority	Inactive	
**Pi Beta Phi**	Texas Alpha	1902	University Panhellenic Council	Sorority	Active	(Note: Chapter formed from Delta Delta Delta, established in 1898.)
**Pi Kappa Alpha**	Beta Mu	1920	Interfraternity Council	Fraternity	Active	
**Pi Kappa Phi**	Zeta Theta	1988–1995, 2009–2019 2025	Interfraternity Council	Fraternity	Active	(Note: Chapter was closed for hazing in 2019.)
**Pi Lambda Chi**	Eta	2017	Multicultural Greek Council	Sorority	Active	
Pi Lambda Phi	Texas Lambda	1969–1973, 1994–2003	Interfraternity Council	Fraternity	Inactive	
**Sigma Alpha Epsilon**	Texas Rho	1884–November 2017	Interfraternity Council	Fraternity	Colony	(Note: Following its suspension by the university and national fraternity for hazing violations in 2017, the chapter withdrew and became a local fraternity called Texas Rho. It was re-established as an emerging chapter (colony) in 2023.)
**Sigma Alpha Mu**	Sigma Theta	1922	Interfraternity Council	Fraternity	Active	
**Sigma Chi**	Alpha Nu	1884–1888, 1890–2004, 2009	Interfraternity Council	Fraternity	Active	
**Sigma Delta Lambda**	Beta	1999	Latino Pan-Hellenic Council	Sorority	Active	
Sigma Delta Tau	Tau	1939–2022	University Panhellenic Council	Sorority	Inactive	
**Sigma Gamma Rho**	Mu Upsilon	1992	National Pan-Hellenic Council	Sorority	Active	
**Sigma Iota Alpha**	Alpha Chi	2011	Latino Pan-Hellenic Council	Sorority	Active	
**Sigma Lambda Alpha**	Eta	2010	Latino Pan-Hellenic Council	Sorority	Active	
**Sigma Lambda Beta**	Eta Alpha	1986	Latino Pan-Hellenic Council	Fraternity	Active	
**Sigma Lambda Gamma**	Xi	1995	Latino Pan-Hellenic Council	Sorority	Active	
Sigma Nu		1886–1990, 1997–2017	Interfraternity Council	Fraternity	Inactive	
**Sigma Phi Epsilon**	Texas Alpha	1930	Interfraternity Council	Fraternity	Active	(Note: Chapter formed from Sigma Eta Chi, established in 1924.)
**Sigma Phi Omega**	Gamma	1991	Texas Asian Pan-Hellenic Council	Sorority	Active	
Sigma Pi	Gamma Theta	1965–1972, 1999–2019	Interfraternity Council	Fraternity	Inactive	
Sigma Tau Gamma	Delta Gamma	1978–1988	Interfraternity Council	Fraternity	Interactive	
Tau Delta Phi	Rho	1926–1975	Interfraternity Council	Fraternity	Inactive	
**Tau Kappa Epsilon**	Gamma Upsilon	1951–1972, 198x ?–199x ?, 2007	Interfraternity Council	Fraternity	Active	(Note: Chapter formed from Psi Beta, formed in 1949.)
**Theta Chi**	Delta Mu	1951–1964, 1989	Interfraternity Council	Fraternity	Active	
Theta Nu Xi	Phi	2002 – c. 2018	Multicultural Greek Council	Sorority	Inactive	
Theta Xi	Rho	1913–1975, 1992–1997	Interfraternity Council	Fraternity	Inactive	
**Zeta Beta Tau**	Lambda	1931–1933, 1969–1993, 200x ?	Interfraternity Council	Fraternity	Active	(Note: Chapter was originally called Alpha Sigma. Chapter absorbed Phi Sigma Delta. Later in 1993, the chapter withdrew from the national fraternity and became Lambda Society. When it was rechartered as Lambda chapter in 200x ?.)
**Zeta Phi Beta**	Omicron Theta	1976	National Pan-Hellenic Council	Sorority	Active	
**Zeta Psi**	Iota Alpha	1979–2005, 2008	Interfraternity Council	Fraternity	Active	
**Zeta Sigma Chi**	Eta	2003	Multicultural Greek Council	Sorority	Active	
**Zeta Tau Alpha**	Kappa	1906	University Panhellenic Council	Women's fraternity	Active	
