= List of Rutgers University fraternities and sororities =

Rutgers University is home to chapters of many Greek organizations; however, only a small percentage of the undergraduate student body is active in Greek life. Several fraternities and sororities maintain houses for their chapters in the area of Union Street (known as "Frat Row") in New Brunswick within blocks of Rutgers' College Avenue Campus.

In 1845, Delta Phi became the first fraternity to organize on the campus. Zeta Psi was the second fraternity and was organized in 1845 as well. Delta Upsilon was the third fraternity to establish itself on the campus in 1858; the first non-secret fraternity in New Brunswick. The Alpha Rho chapter of Chi Psi fraternity, founded at Rutgers College in 1879, was the first fraternity at Rutgers to own a fraternity house, or "Lodge", purchased in 1887. The fraternity today still owns and occupies the same property at 114 College Avenue. Presently, there are over fifty fraternities and sororities on the New Brunswick-Piscataway campus, ranging from traditional to historically African-American, Latino, Multicultural and Asian-interest organizations. Greek organizations are governed by the Office of Fraternity and Sorority Affairs. Twelve organizations currently maintain chapters in New Brunswick without sanction by the University's administration.

Following is a list of Rutgers University fraternities and sororities, organized by national umbrella organization or type of Greek letter organization.

== Interfraternity Council ==
The following fraternities at Rutgers University are members or former of the North American Interfraternity Conference (IFC).

- Alpha Epsilon Pi
- Alpha Kappa Lambda
- Alpha Phi Delta
- Alpha Sigma Phi
- Beta Chi Theta
- Chi Phi
- Chi Psi
- Delta Chi
- Delta Epsilon Psi
- Delta Kappa Epsilon
- Delta Phi
- Delta Upsilon
- Kappa Sigma
- Phi Gamma Delta
- Phi Kappa Psi
- Phi Kappa Tau
- Phi Mu Delta
- Phi Sigma Kappa
- Pi Kappa Alpha
- Pi Kappa Phi
- Sigma Alpha Epsilon
- Sigma Alpha Mu
- Sigma Beta Rho
- Sigma Chi
- Sigma Phi Delta
- Sigma Phi Epsilon
- Sigma Pi
- Tau Epsilon Phi
- Tau Kappa Epsilon
- Theta Delta Chi
- Zeta Beta Tau
- Zeta Psi

== Multicultural Greek Council ==
The following sororities and fraternities at Rutgers are members of the National Multicultural Greek Council.

- alpha Kappa Delta Phi (sorority)
- Chi Upsilon Sigma (sorority)
- Delta Kappa Delta (sorority)
- Delta Phi Omega (sorority)
- Delta Sigma Iota (fraternity)
- Iota Nu Delta (fraternity)
- Kappa Phi Gamma (sorority)
- Kappa Phi Lambda (sorority)
- Lambda Alpha Upsilon (fraternity)
- Lambda Pi Chi (sorority)
- Lambda Sigma Upsilon (fraternity)
- Lambda Tau Omega (sorority)
- Lambda Theta Alpha (sorority)
- Lambda Theta Phi (fraternity)
- Lambda Upsilon Lambda (fraternity)
- Mu Sigma Upsilon (sorority)
- Nu Alpha Phi (fraternity)
- Omega Phi Beta (sorority)
- Omega Phi Chi (sorority)
- Pi Delta Psi (fraternity)
- Sigma Lambda Gamma (sorority)
- Sigma Lambda Upsilon (sorority)
- Sigma Psi Zeta (sorority)
- Sigma Sigma Rho (sorority)

== National Pan-Hellenic Council ==
The following historically African American fraternities and sororities at Rutgers are members of the National Pan-Hellenic Council.

- Alpha Kappa Alpha (sorority)
- Alpha Phi Alpha (fraternity)
- Delta Sigma Theta (sorority)
- Iota Phi Theta (fraternity)
- Kappa Alpha Psi (fraternity)
- Omega Psi Phi (fraternity)
- Phi Beta Sigma (fraternity)
- Zeta Phi Beta (sorority)

== Panhellenic Council ==
The following sororities and women's fraternities at Rutgers are members of the National Panhellenic Conference.

- Alpha Chi Omega
- Alpha Gamma Delta
- Alpha Omega Epsilon
- Delta Gamma
- Gamma Phi Beta
- Phi Mu
- Phi Sigma Rho
- Phi Sigma Sigma
- Sigma Delta Tau
- Zeta Tau Alpha

== Professional Fraternity Council ==
The following professional fraternities and sororities at Rutgers are independent or are members of the Professional Fraternity Association.

- Alpha Kappa Psi (coed business fraternity)
- Alpha Phi Omega (coed service fraternity)
- Alpha Zeta (coed agricultural and natural resources fraternity
- Alpha Zeta Omega (coed pharmaceutical fraternity)
- Delta Sigma Pi (coed business fraternity)
- Lambda Kappa Sigma (pharmacy sorority)
- Mu Beta Psi (coed music fraternity)
- Omega Phi Alpha (service sorority)
- Phi Alpha Delta (coed law fraternity)
- Phi Chi Theta (coed business and economics fraternity)
- Phi Delta Chi (coed pharmacy fraternity)
- Phi Delta Epsilon (coed pre-medical fraternity)
- Phi Sigma Pi (coed honor fraternity)
- Theta Tau (coed engineering fraternity)
