= Cultural interest fraternities and sororities =

Cultural interest fraternities and sororities, in the North American student fraternity and sorority system, refer to general, social organizations oriented to students having a special interest in a culture or cultural identity.

Although racial and religious restrictions have long since been abolished in all North American Interfraternity Conference and National Panhellenic Conference organizations, their memberships nationally remain predominantly Caucasian, and National Pan-Hellenic Council memberships largely African American. The new generation of cultural interest organizations has arisen to serve the interests of communities whose numbers in the traditional Greek system are historically small and dispersed.

Following is a list of national cultural interest fraternities and sororities.

== African American ==
African-American fraternities and sororities are social organizations that predominantly recruit Black college students and provide a network that includes both undergraduate and alumni members. These organizations were typically founded by Black American undergraduate students, faculty, and leaders at various institutions in the United States.

== Armenian ==
Organization	Symbols	Founded	Founding location	Type	Affiliation	Active chapters	Status	Refs.
Alpha Epsilon Omega	ΑΕΩ	December 20, 2000	California State University, Northridge	Fraternity		9	Active	
Alpha Gamma Alpha	ΑΓΑ	October 25, 2002	University of California, Los Angeles	Sorority		1	Active	

== Asian American ==
There are over sixty Asian American interest Greek-lettered organizations, many of which are overseen by the National APIDA Panhellenic Association.

== Buddhist ==
Organization	Symbols	Founded	Founding location	Type	Affiliation	Active chapters	Status	Refs.
Delta Beta Tau	ΔΒΤ	September 9, 2015	San Diego State University	Coed fraternity	Independent	1	Active	

== Christian ==
While most of the traditional women's fraternities or sororities were founded decades before the start of the 20th century, the first ever specifically Christian-themed Greek letter organization formed was the Kappa Phi Club, founded in Kansas in 1916. The three largest Christian fraternities established in the early part of the 20th century are Beta Sigma Psi, Alpha Gamma Omega, and Sigma Theta Epsilon; all are still active.

== Italian-American ==
Organization	Symbols	Founded	Founding location	Type	Affiliation	Active chapters	Status	Refs.
Alpha Phi Delta ^{*}	ΑΦΔ	November 5, 1914	Syracuse University	Fraternity	NIC	48	Active	

== Feminist ==
Organization	Symbols	Founded	Founding location	Type	Affiliation	Active chapters	Status	Refs.
Zeta Omega Eta	ΖΩΗ	2003	Trinity College	Sorority, coed	Independent	2	Active	

== Latino ==
Latino Greek-letter organizations, in the North American student fraternity and sorority system, refer to general or social organizations oriented to students having a special interest in Latino culture and identity. The first known Latino fraternal organization was Alpha Zeta fraternity, established in 1889 at Cornell University.

== LGBTQ ==
LGBTQ fraternities and sororities have existed since the 1980s, with Delta Phi Upsilon being established in 1985 and Delta Lambda Phi in 1986. These groups are intended to provide members with access to Greek life without fear of homophobic reprisal or behavior by fellow members, resulting from a history of homophobia within longer-established organizations.

== Multicultural ==
These organizations do not identify with a specific cultural identity. Some may fall under associations that cater to specific cultural backgrounds, however, the organization itself refers to itself as Multicultural.

Organization	Symbols	Founded	Founding location	Type	Affiliation	Active chapters	Status	Refs.
Beta Xi Chi	ΒΞΧ	November 11, 1998	Texas A&M University	Fraternity	Independent	0	Inactive	
Chi Sigma Upsilon	ΧΣΕ	November 1, 1993	Rutgers University	Sorority	NMGC (former)		Active	
Chi Sigma Xi	ΧΣΞ	April 1, 2010	University of Toronto Scarborough	Sorority	Independent	1	Active	
Delphic Fraternity	ΓΣΤ	October 13, 1871	State University of New York at Geneseo	Fraternity	NMGC (former)	4	Active	
Delta Alpha Omega	ΔΑΩ	August 22, 2001	University of Texas at Arlington	Fraternity	Independent	1	Active	
Delta Alpha Sigma	ΔΑΣ	March 10, 2004	University of Texas at Arlington	Sorority	Independent	5	Active	
Delta Gamma Pi	ΔΓΠ	November 11, 1998	Towson University and Frostburg State University	Sorority	Independent	0	Inactive	
Delta Psi Alpha	ΔΨΑ	November 24, 1998	Northern Illinois University	Coed Fraternity	Independent	2	Active	
Delta Psi Sigma	ΔΨΣ	January 14, 2001	New York City, New York	Sorority	Independent	5	Active	
Delta Sigma Chi	ΔΣΧ	November 27, 1996	New York City College of Technology	Sorority	NMGC (former)	11	Active	
Delta Xi Nu	ΔΞΝ	October 7, 1997	Texas A&M University	Sorority	NMGC	20	Active	
Delta Xi Phi	ΔΞΦ	April 20, 1994	University of Illinois at Urbana–Champaign	Sorority	NMGC	23	Active	
Epsilon Sigma Rho	ΕΣΡ	March 2, 1986	California State University, Sacramento	Fraternity	Independent	9	Active	
Gamma Eta	ΓΗ	October 18, 1995	University of Florida	Sorority	NMGC	8	Active	
Iota Nu Kappa	ΙΝΚ	September 13, 2010	University of Maine	Fraternity	Independent	1	Active	
Kappa Lambda Xi	ΚΛΞ	October 7, 2003	University of Maryland, College Park and Long Island University	Sorority	Independent	1	Active	
Lambda Iota Upsilon	ΛΙΥ	1998	State University of New York at Delhi	Fraternity	Traditional	1	Active	
Lambda Phi Xi	ΛΦΞ	January 27, 2004	Michigan State University & Purdue University Calumet	Sorority	Independent	1	Active	
Lambda Psi Delta	ΛΨΔ	March 9, 1997	Yale University	Sorority	NMGC (former)	0	Inactive	
Lambda Sigma Gamma	ΛΣΓ	October 24, 1986	Sacramento State University	Sorority	NMGC	26	Active	
Lambda Tau Omega	ΛΤΩ	October 9, 1988	Montclair State College	Sorority	NMGC	12	Active	
MALIK		May 13, 1977	Long Island University	Fraternity	Independent		Active	
Mu Sigma Upsilon	ΜΣΥ	November 21, 1981	Rutgers University	Sorority	NMGC	66	Active	
Omega Delta	ΩΔ	January 19, 1997	University of Illinois at Urbana–Champaign	Fraternity	Independent	8	Active	
Omega Delta Phi	ΩΔΦ	November 25, 1987	Texas Tech University	Fraternity	NIC, NALFO (former)	70	Active	
Omega Phi Chi	ΩΦΧ	November 9, 1988	Rutgers University	Sorority	NMGC	26	Active	
Phi Sigma Chi Multicultural Fraternity	ΨΣΧ	November 16, 1996	New York City College of Technology	Fraternity	NMGC	13	Active	
Psi Sigma Phi	ΨΣΦ	December 12, 1990	Montclair State University and New Jersey City University	Fraternity	NMGC	17	Active	
Sigma Alpha Zeta	ΣΑΖ	October 17, 1992	California State University, Fresno	Sorority	Independent	8	Active	
Sigma Beta Rho	ΣΒΡ	August 16, 1996	University of Pennsylvania	Fraternity	NIC, NMGC (former)	23	Active	
Sigma Lambda Gamma	ΣΛΓ	April 9, 1990	University of Iowa	Sorority	NALFO (former)	235	Active	
Sigma Omega Phi	ΣΩΦ	April 26, 1990	California State University, Chico	Sorority	Independent	5	Active	
Sigma Theta Psi	ΣΘΨ	November 13, 1991	San Jose State University	Sorority	Independent	8	Active	
Tau Phi Sigma	ΤΦΣ	November 11, 1992	University of Illinois at Urbana–Champaign	Fraternity	NIC (former)	6	Active	
Theta Delta Sigma	ΘΔΣ	April 15, 2001	University at Buffalo, The State University of New York	Gender Inclusive	Independent	9	Active	
Theta Nu Kappa	ΘΝΚ	November 20, 2007	University of California, Santa Barbara	Fraternity	Independent	1	Active	
Theta Nu Xi	ΘΝΞ	April 11, 1997	University of North Carolina at Chapel Hill	Sorority	NMGC	64	Active	
Tau Theta Pi	ΤΘΠ	November 24, 1998	University of Southern California	Sorority	Independent	4	Active	
Upsilon Kappa Delta	ΥΚΔ	December 10, 1993	California State University, Chico	Sorority	Independent	6	Active	
Xi Alpha Pi	ΞΑΠ	2008	University of Toronto St. George	Fraternity	Independent	2	Active	
Zeta Chi Phi	ΖΧΦ	January 30, 2003	University of Texas at San Antonio	Sorority	Independent	1	Active	
Zeta Sigma Chi	ΖΣΧ	March 3, 1991	Northern Illinois University	Sorority	Independent	22	Active	

== Muslim ==
Organization name	Symbols	Founded	Founding location	Type	Affiliation	Active chapters	Status	Refs.
Gamma Gamma Chi	ΓΓΧ	April 3, 2005	Greensboro, North Carolina	Sorority, community-based	Independent	1	Active	
Alpha Lambda Mu	ΑΛΜ	February 12, 2013	University of Texas at Dallas	Fraternity	Independent	6	Active	
Mu Delta Alpha	ΜΔΑ	February 17, 2014	University of Texas at Dallas	Sorority	Independent	5	Active	
Xi Delta Pi	ΞΔΠ	2009	George Washington University	Sorority	Independent	0	Inactive	

== Native American ==
Organization	Symbols	Founded	Founding location	Type	Affiliation	Active chapters	Status	Refs.
Alpha Pi Omega	ΑΠΩ	September 1, 1994	University of North Carolina at Chapel Hill	Sorority	Independent	20	Active	
Beta Sigma Epsilon	ΒΣΕ	January 1, 2000	University of Arizona	Fraternity	Independent	4	Active	
Epsilon Chi Nu	ΕΧΝ	January 1, 1996	East Carolina University	Fraternity	Independent	2	Active	
Gamma Beta Lambda	ΓΒΛ	October 2, 1963	Vancouver, British Columbia, Canada	Fraternity, non-collegiate	Independent	1	Active	
Gamma Delta Pi	ΓΔΠ	August 27, 2000	University of Oklahoma	Sorority	Independent	1	Active	
Iota Gamma	ΙΓ	October 22, 2004	University of Oklahoma	Fraternity	Independent	4	Active	(Note: Group was called Sigma Nu Alpha Gamma until a rebranding decision in the summer of 2022.)
Phi Sigma Nu	ΦΣΝ	February 13, 1996	University of North Carolina at Pembroke	Fraternity	Independent	5	Active	
Sigma Omicron Epsilon	ΣΟΕ	March 30, 1997	East Carolina University	Sorority	Independent	3	Active	

== Persian ==
Organization	Symbols	Founded	Founding location	Type	Affiliation	Active chapters	Status	Refs.
Sigma Pi Sigma Psi	ΣΠΣ	May 18, 2009	University of California, Los Angeles	Sorority	Independent	1	Active	

== See also ==
- College fraternities and sororities
- Fraternities and sororities in Canada
- List of fraternities and sororities in France
- List of fraternities and sororities in the Philippines
- List of fraternities and sororities in Puerto Rico
- List of social fraternities
- List of social sororities and women's fraternities
- Professional fraternities and sororities
- Racism in United States college fraternities and sororities
- Service fraternities and sororities
