= Lambda Psi Delta =

American multicultural college sorority

- ΛΨΔ
- Founded: March 9, 1997; 29 years ago Yale University
- Type: Service and social
- Former affiliation: NMGC
- Status: Dormant ?
- Emphasis: Multicultural
- Scope: National
- Motto: "Sovereignty to the Community"
- Pillars: Intellectual Development, Empowerment of Women, Leadership, Cultural Awareness, and Upliftment of Community
- Colors: Coal black and lily white
- Flower: White calla lily
- Jewel: Diamond
- Mascot: White Bengal tiger
- Publication: The Tiger's Tale
- Chapters: 13 chartered
- Nickname: LPsiD
- Headquarters: P.O. Box 734; Old Saybrook, Connecticut 06475; United States
- Website: www.lambdapsidelta.org

Lambda Psi Delta Sorority, Inc. (ΛΨΔ) was a multicultural, community service-based Greek-lettered sorority founded on March 9, 1997. Lambda Psi Delta (referred to as "LPsiD") was established by a group of women known as the Nine Black Diamonds. Lambda Psi Delta was a founding member of the National Multicultural Greek Council (NMGC) but is no longer a member.

As of c. 2017, active chapters appeared to have ceased operations, while alumnae continued to meet. The national website was no longer available.

== History ==
Lambda Psi Delta Sorority, Inc. was founded on March 9, 1997, at Yale University by nine women who were formerly part of a Latina sorority. They decided to leave their former sorority (Alpha Rho Lambda/Alianza de Raíces Latina Sorority, Inc.) and create an organization whose primary goal was to uplift and empower of women and their communities. They formed Lambda Psi Delta, a multi-ethnic, service-based organization, for women by women and about women. Its motto is "sovereignty to the community."

The founders were referred to as the Nine Black Diamonds. They were:

- Ericka Ramos Carrasquillo
- Irma Beatriz Cordero
- Marina Lori Franzoni
- Laura Elaine Gilbert
- Paula Arputhasamy Ladd
- Margarita Martis Navarro
- Denise J. Pipersburgh
- Karina Tejeda
- Isabel Veguilla

The sorority incorporated in 1998 in Connecticut. Lambda Psi Delta was a founding member of the National Multicultural Greek Council (NMGC) in 1998 but is no longer a member.

The LILies was the official interest group of Lambda Psi Delta Sorority, Inc. The acronym LILies stands for Ladies Interested in Lambda Psi Delta.

Lambda Psi Delta chartered undergraduate chapters in Florida, New Jersey, Connecticut, Texas and Louisiana. It also had two graduate chapters. Although the sorority worked primarily in minority communities, its members were from a variety of backgrounds. The national headquarters of Lambda Psi Delta is in Old Saybrook, Connecticut.

== Symbols ==
The motto of Lambda Psi Delta is "Sovereignty to the Community". Its five tenets or pillars are Intellectual Development, Empowerment of Women, Leadership, Cultural Awareness, and Upliftment of Community.

The sorority's colors are coal black and lily white. Its flower is the white calla lily. Its jewel is the diamond. Its mascot is the white bengal tiger. Lambda Psi Delta's nickname is LPsiD. Its quarterly national newsletter is The Tiger's Tale.

== Activities ==
Lambda Psi Delta activities included public service and political service. Held annually on October 24, its Unity Day was the sorority's designated day to recognize and celebrate diversity on campus. Its Diamond Days was a weeklong event each March that celebrates the sorority's founders with various community service and political projects at the chapter level. Other programs included the LPsiD College Resource Center and the Lambda Psi Delta National Educational Campaign Programs that addressed current societal concerns, such as autism awareness, breast cancer, global warming, date rape, and identity theft. Its National Public and Political Service Program focused on changing initiatives, including multiple sclerosis research and STEP UP – SPEAK OUT! Bullying Awareness and Prevention Campaign. The later was a partnership initiative with Omega Phi Chi sorority.

== Governance ==
Oversight was provided by a national executive board, consisting of the national executive committee, regional officers, the immediate past national president, and the sorority's legal advisor. The national executive committee included the national president, national vice-president, national treasurer, national secretary, national second-vice president, national recruitment officer, assistant national recruitment officer - Western region, assistant national recruitment officer - Mid-western region, Northeastern regional director, Northeastern regional representative, Southwestern regional director, Southwestern regional representative, web administrator, and two NMGC representatives.

== Chapters ==
In the following chapter list, active chapters are indicated in bold and inactive chapters are indicated in italics, while the names of those chapters whose status are unknown are listed in plain text. Graduate chapters are indicated with the prefix Gamma.

Chapter	Charter date and range	Institution	Location	Status	Ref.
Alpha	March 9, 1997	Greater New Haven Area: Yale University, University of New Haven, and Southern Connecticut State University	New Haven, Connecticut	Inactive ?	(Note: Formed at Yale University and later expanded into a citywide chapter, including more campuses.)
Beta	January 25, 1998	Greater Hartford Area: Trinity College, University of Hartford, and Saint Joseph's College	Hartford, Connecticut	Inactive ?	
Gamma (see Gamma Alpha)	199x ?	National Graduate Association	United States	Moved	(Note: Alumnae from Alpha, Beta, Zeta, Eta, Theta and Iota chapters established this as the sorority's first graduate chapter. The chapter's name was changed to Gamma Alpha when it became regional, rather than national.)
Delta	February 7, 1999	Our Lady of the Lake University	San Antonio, Texas	Inactive ?	
Epsilon	December 4, 1999	University of South Florida	Tampa, Florida	Inactive ?	
Omega	2001			Memorial	
Zeta	Spring 2004	Ramapo College	Mahwah, New Jersey	Inactive ?	
Eta	March 6, 2004	Seton Hall University	South Orange, New Jersey	Inactive ?	(Note: Started as a colony in 2004.)
Theta	Fall 2004	Wesleyan University	Middletown, Connecticut	Inactive ?	
Iota	2005	Rutgers University	New Brunswick, New Jersey	Inactive ?	
Kappa	July 17, 2006	Texas Woman's University	Denton, Texas	Inactive ?	
Lambda	January 10, 2009	Nicholls State University	Thibodaux, Louisiana	Inactive ?	
**Gamma Alpha**	199x ?	Graduate - Northeastern Region	New Jersey	Active	(Note: The chapter includes alumnae in Connecticut, New Jersey, and New York.)
**Gamma Beta**	January 14, 2007	Graduate - Southeastern Region	Florida	Active	(Note: This chapter was formed by alumnae of the Epsilon chapter.)

== See also ==
- List of social sororities and women's fraternities
- Cultural interest fraternities and sororities
