= Psi Sigma Phi =

American multicultural collegiate fraternity

- ΨΣΦ
- Founded: December 12, 1990; 35 years ago: Montclair State University; New Jersey City University
- Type: Social
- Affiliation: NMGC
- Status: Active
- Emphasis: cultural interest - Multiculturalism
- Scope: National
- Motto: "Multicultural by birth, not by choice'"
- Pillars: Education, Brotherhood, Multiculturalism, Service
- Colors: Black, Silver, and White
- Symbol: Almighty Knight
- Chapters: 17
- Nickname: Phimen, Phiman
- Headquarters: 344 Grove Street, #4017; Jersey City, New Jersey 07302; United States
- Website: www.psisigmaphi.org

Psi Sigma Phi Multicultural Fraternity, Inc. (ΨΣΦ) was founded December 12, 1990, at Montclair State University and New Jersey City University. The Eighteen Founding Fathers believed that multiculturalism is not indicative of the physical composition of an organization on a chapter or national level; it is viewed as a state of mind––a philosophy that embraces any aspects of cultural identity with unconditional respect and equality. It is a National Multicultural Greek Council member.

== History ==
Psi Sigma Phi Multicultural Fraternity Inc. was co-founded on December 12, 1990, at Montclair State University and New Jersey City University (at the time Jersey City State College) as a service-oriented, multicultural fraternity.

At the time of its founding, male college students in New Jersey could join only mainstream fraternities or fraternities that were predominantly Latin-American, African-American, or Asian-American. Psi Sigma Phi's founders created the fraternity to emphasize the importance of multiculturalism in the lives of college students.

The founding fathers of Psi Sigma Phi were:

- Denny William Aguilar
- Travis Sheldon Anderson
- Juanito Patricio Chiluisa
- Marco Antonio Costoso
- John Escalante
- Rafael Rosario Figueroa Jr.
- Jesus Garcia
- Aramiz Gonzales
- Victor Drew Hanson
- Marcelino Jimenez Jr.
- William Mir
- Efrain Nunez Jr.
- Gordon Patterson
- Edwin Reyes
- Tomas de los Reyes III
- Herbert Roman
- David Bilal Sharif
- Milton Suarez

Psi Sigma Phi's fraternal goal is to establish a unique bond among men of different cultures. This goal is accomplished through hard work, sacrifice, and courage from all of its brothers, who strive to break social fears and ignorance.

The fraternity is a member of the National Multicultural Greek Council.

== Symbols ==
The fraternity's colors are black, silver, and white. Its symbol is the Almighty Knight. Its motto is "Multicultural by birth not by choice". Its pillars are: "Our Sword is Education, Our Shield is Brotherhood, Our Armor is Multiculturalism, Our Steed is Service."

== Philanthropy ==
Psi Sigma Phi's national philanthropy is the Kidney and Urology Foundation. Other organizations supported on a national level include City Year, Food Bank of New Jersey, American Cancer Society, Newark Soup Kitchens, and Adopt-a-Highway.

== Chapters ==
Following is a list of Psi Sigma Phi chapters. Active chapters are indicated in bold. Inactive chapters are in italics.

Chapter	Charter date	Institution	Location	Status	Ref.
Alpha	December 12, 1990	Montclair State University	Montclair, New Jersey	Inactive	
**Beta**	December 12, 1990	New Jersey City University	Jersey City, New Jersey	Active	
**Gamma**	October 11, 1991	Seton Hall University	South Orange, New Jersey	Active	
Delta	September 16, 2000	Kean University	Union, New Jersey	Inactive	
**Epsilon**	August 18, 1994	Rutgers University–New Brunswick	New Brunswick, New Jersey	Active	
**Zeta**	November 29, 2001 – 20xx ?; 2018	Ramapo College	Mahwah, New Jersey	Active	
**Eta**	April 12, 2000	Utah State University	Logan, Utah	Active	
**Theta**	June 24, 2000	New Jersey Area	Jersey City, New Jersey	Active	
Iota	January 27, 2001	Pennsylvania State University	State College, Pennsylvania	Inactive	
Kappa	October 31, 2003	University of North Carolina at Chapel Hill	Chapel Hill, North Carolina	Inactive	
Lambda	April 28, 2007	Shippensburg University of Pennsylvania	Shippensburg, Pennsylvania	Inactive	
**Mu**	July 15, 2007	University of North Carolina at Charlotte	Charlotte, North Carolina	Active	
**Nu**	September 10, 2008	Weber State University	Ogden, Utah	Active	
**Xi**	November 29, 2008	Temple University	Philadelphia, Pennsylvania	Active	
**Omicron**	April 28, 2010	Rowan University	Glassboro, New Jersey	Active	
**Pi**	November 30, 2010	University of North Carolina at Greensboro	Greensboro, North Carolina	Active	
**Rho**	November 22, 2014	Caldwell University	Caldwell, New Jersey	Active	
**Sigma**	November 25, 2015	Felician University	Rutherford, New Jersey	Active	
**Tau**	November 13, 2018	Bloomfield College	Bloomfield, New Jersey	Active	
**Upsilon**	November 10, 2019	Virginia Commonwealth University	Richmond, Virginia	Active	
**Phi**	2020	Colorado College	Colorado Springs, Colorado	Active	

== See also ==
- Cultural interest fraternities and sororities
- Multiculturalism
- Multicultural education
- National Multicultural Greek Council
- List of social fraternities and sororities
