= Lambda Phi Xi =

American multicultural sorority

- ΛΦΞ
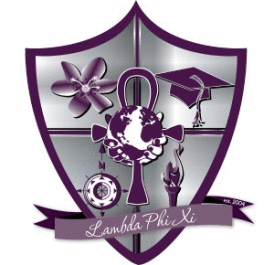
- Founded: January 27, 2004; 22 years ago Michigan State University and Purdue University Calumet
- Type: Social & Service Multicultural Sorority
- Affiliation: Independent
- Status: Active
- Emphasis: Multicultural
- Scope: Local
- Motto: "Soaring to Excellence through Sisterhood"
- Pillars: Sisterhood, Education, Personal Values, Strength
- Colors: Purple, Black, and Silver
- Symbol: Shooting Star
- Flower: Tiger Lily
- Jewel: Amethyst
- Mascot: Siberian Husky
- Philanthropy: She's The First
- Chapters: 1 active, 5 chartered
- Nickname: Lady Xi
- Headquarters: Reno, Nevada; United States
- Website: lambdaphixi.wix.com/lpxnational

Lambda Phi Xi Multicultural Sorority, Inc. (ΛΦΞ, also known as Lady Xis) is an American sorority founded on January 27, 2004, at Michigan State University and Purdue University Calumet.

== History ==
Five women formed Lambda Phi Xi on January 27, 2004. The sorority was jointly founded at Michigan State University in East Lansing, Michigan and Purdue University Calumet in the Northwest Indiana. Michigan State was its Alpha chapter and Purdue University was the Beta chapter.

Lambda Phi Xi is a multicultural sorority focusing on service and social activities. Three more chapters were added in 2004 and 2005 in Indiana, Georgia, and Nevada. However, the Epsilon chapter at the University of Nevada, Reno is the only active chapter as of 2024. Lambda Phi Xi's philanthropy is She's The First.

Lambda Phi Xi became incorporated on June 11, 2005, changing its name to Lambda Phi Xi Multicultural Sorority, Inc.

== Symbols ==
Lambda Phi Xi's motto is "Soaring to Excellence through Sisterhood." Its symbol is the shooting star. Its flower is the tiger lily, its jewel is amethyst, and its mascot is the Siberian Husky. The sorority's colors are purple, black, and silver. Its members are often referred to as Lady Xis. Its pillars are Sisterhood, Education, Personal Values, and Strength.

== Chapters ==
Following is a list of Lambda Phi XI chapters. Active chapters are noted in bold. Inactive chapters noted in italics.

Chapter	Charter date	Institution	Location	Status	Ref.
Alpha	2004	Michigan State University	East Lansing, Michigan	Inactive	
Beta	2004	Purdue University - Calumet	Hammond, Indiana	Inactive	
Gamma	2004	Purdue University - West Lafayette	West Lafayette, Indiana	Inactive	
Delta	2004	Atlanta Citywide	Atlanta, Georgia	Inactive	
**Epsilon**	2005	University of Nevada, Reno	Reno, Nevada	Active	

== See also ==
- Cultural interest fraternities and sororities
