= MALIK Fraternity =

American multicultural fraternity

- MΣΨ
- Founded: May 13, 1977; 49 years ago LIU Post
- Type: Social
- Affiliation: NMGC
- Status: Active
- Emphasis: Multicultural - Black, Brown, and Latino empowerment
- Scope: National
- Motto: "The Mind Is the Standard of the Man"
- Pillars: Manhood, Achievement, Leadership, Integrity, and Knowledge
- Colors: Orange and Black
- Symbol: The Angry Afrikan
- Mascot: Snake
- Publication: The Crown
- Philanthropy: The MALIK Foundation
- Chapters: 6 active, 16 chartered
- Nickname: The Kings; The Steel, and Velvet Brothers
- National Stroll Team: Team S.T.A.B
- Headquarters: 167 East 124th Street #1340; New York City, New York 10035; United States
- Website: www.malikfraternity.org

MALIK Fraternity, Inc., previously known as MALIK Sigma Psi or MΣΨ, is an American multicultural intercollegiate fraternity founded in 1977, at CW Post College of Long Island University for men of color. Rather than refer to themselves as black Greeks, they use the term "Afrikan Fraternalists". Though mainly aimed toward Black, Brown, and Latino men, MALIK has members of all races, ethnicities, and creeds.

== History ==
Roland K. Hawkins, Larry B. Martin, and Darryl L. Mitchell first conceived of the fraternity and are known as its Khalifas. In its organizational state, the Khalifas defined the fraternity's values as "S.N.A.K.E.": Success, Nobility, Achievement, Knowledge, and Enlightenment. The Khalifas recruited twelve more founders, later called the Sir Crowns of MALIK Sigma Psi because every king has a crown. The Sir Crowns of MALIK Sigma Psi were:

- James Banks
- Joseph Diaz Jr.
- Edward Harris
- Ernest Heyward
- Lethorne Johnson
- George Lembrecht
- Kyle Little
- Anthony Pitts
- Edward Rivers
- Kevin Simon
- Bryant Stafford
- Al Washington

Together these 15 men established MALIK Sigma Psi on May 18, 1977, at CW Post College of Long Island University. MALIK was founded as, and still is, a social justice fraternity. Its founders were men of color; several were of Latino ancestry.

Although a fraternity, the founders set the precedence of being very open with information, symbols, and knowledge, a major departure from the very secretive nature of traditional fraternalism. Ideologically, MALIK is against the idea of black Greeks. It organizes its Kingdoms (chapters) according to the Arabic alphabet as opposed to Greek letters. Rather than referring to themselves as being black Greeks, members of MALIK use the term "Afrikan Fraternalists". The group did not join the National Pan Hellenic Council.

MALIK was incorporated in the State of New York in 1979. On May 18, 2002, MALIK Sigma Psi transitioned its name to MALIK Fraternity, Inc. The fraternity still uses the acronym MSP, though it has a completely separate meaning from MΣΨ.

In October 2023, MALIK joined the National Multicultural Greek Council, as it was a better fit for the fraternity's vision of multiculturalism. Its national headquarters is in New York City, New York.

== Symbols and traditions ==
African Fraternalism includes such beliefs as the African origin of civilization, reclaiming the stolen legacy of African knowledge, the oneness of all African peoples, the importance of ritual and initiation, the value of a male ritual kinship system, respect for and seeking equal partnership with women, the reception and cultivation of the Spirit of Learning, the necessity of serving the community, the calling to work on one's personal and spiritual development, the study and promotion of "MALIKology" and African symbology, and the usage of African symbolism.

MALIKology is the Fraternity's interpretation of the "science of manhood." The acronym MALIK is represented as Manhood, Achievement, Leadership, Integrity, and Knowledge. It is a synthesis of science, history, philosophy, and cultural values and practices from the African Diaspora about the nature, purpose, direction, function, and responsibility of manhood. The group's name partially comes from the Arabic name of Malcolm X.

The group had originally used an entirely Swahili and Arabic name but were forced to change it because of New York's requirement that all college fraternities must have at least two Greek letters in their name. In this case the M is the Latin Alphabet, as opposed to being a Mu while the Σ and Ψ are both Greek letters. The name of the fraternity can also be written as "ملك" or "م ل ك", reflecting the fraternity's use of the Arabic abjad as opposed to the Greek alphabet.

The fraternity's motto is "The Mind is the Standard of the Man". Its pillars are Manhood, Achievement, Leadership, Integrity, and knowledge. Its colors are orange and black. Its symbol is The Angry Afrikan. Its mascot is the snake. Its members are called The Kings, The Steel, and Velvet Brothers. Its publication is The Crown.

== Foundation ==
In 2013, the MALIK Foundation, Incorporated was established as an IRC Section 501(c)(3) "to ensure the freedom, resilience and wellness of African and African Diasporic communities..." The Foundation holds an annual fundraising dinner called the Black History Month Gala. The foundation's focus areas are male youth development, community resilience, and leadership development.

== Chapters ==
=== Collegiate ===
The undergraduate kingdoms (chapters) of MALIK are named after the letters in the Arabic alphabet in the common hijāʾī order. Undergraduate colonies are called villages until meeting certain criteria. In the following list, active chapters are indicated in bold and inactive chapters are in italics. (Note: Many Kingdoms use Egyptian hieroglyphics to identify themselves in addition to the Arabic letters they've been given)

Number	Kingdom	Symbol	Charter date and range	Institution	Location	Status	Ref.
1	Genesis		May 13, 1977	LIU Post	Brookville, New York	Inactive	
2	Alif	ا	1978	New York Institute of Technology	New York City, New York	Inactive	
3	Ba	ب	1980	Rutgers University	New Jersey	Inactive	
4	Taa	ت	1981	Hofstra University	Hempstead and Uniondale, New York	Inactive	
5	Thaa	ث	1982	Adelphi University	Garden City, New York	Inactive	
6	**Jeem**	ج	1984	Stony Brook University	Stony Brook, New York	Active	
7	Ha	ح	1991	Norfolk State University	Norfolk, Virginia	Inactive	
8	**Kha**	خ	1994	State University of New York at Old Westbury	Old Westbury, New York	Active	
9	Dal	د	1994	University at Buffalo	Buffalo, New York	Inactive	
10	Thal	ذ	1998	Farmingdale State College	East Farmingdale, New York	Inactive	
11	**Ra**	ر	1999	State University of New York at New Paltz	New Paltz, New York	Active	
12	**Zay**	ز	2003	Binghamton University	New York	Active	
13	Sin	س	2006	Ramapo College	Mahwah, New Jersey	Inactive	
14	**Shin**	ش	2006	University at Albany, SUNY	Albany, New York	Active	
15	Ṣād	ص	20xx ?	City College of New York	New York City, New York	Inactive	
16	**Daad**	ض	April 25, 2017	Cornell University	Ithaca, New York	Active	
	**Provisional Village at Florida Agricultural and Mechanical University**			Florida A&M University	Tallahassee, Florida	Active	

=== Graduate ===
Graduate Shabazz or chapters are named after their locations and letters in the Arabic alphabet. In the following list, active chapters are indicated in bold. Inactive chapters are in italics.

Number	Shabazz	Symbol	Charter date and range	Location	Status	Ref.
1	**N.Y.C. Alif**	ا		New York City, New York	Active	
2	**Newark Ba**	ب		Newark, New Jersey	Active	
3	Westchester Taa	ت		Westchester County, New York	Inactive	
4	Long Island Thaa	ث		Long Island, New York	Inactive	
5	**D.C. Jeem**	ج		Washington, D.C.	Active	
6	**Charlotte Ha**	ح	April 12, 2017	Charlotte, North Carolina	Active	
7	**Orlando Kha**	خ		Orlando, Florida	Active	
8	**Atlanta Dal**	د		Atlanta, Georgia	Active	

== Auxiliary Groups ==
24 women established the Malik Melodies Sweetheart Club on the C.W. Post Campus of Long Island University on December 14, 1978, as a social service organization and the official auxiliary women's group to MALIK Fraternity. Malik Melodies was reorganized in 1998 as the Malik Melodies Sisterhood, Inc, becoming an independently run organization.

== Notable members ==
=== Honorary members ===
- Charles Barron (honorary, New York Assembly
- Yosef Ben-Jochannan (honorary) historian and writer
- Pablo Guzmán (honorary), television personality
- Gil Noble (honorary), television reporter and personality
- Richie Pérez (honorary) teacher and activist

== See also ==
- History of North American fraternities and sororities
- List of African-American Greek and fraternal organizations
- List of Latino Greek-letter organizations
- National Multicultural Greek Council
