= Beta Sigma Epsilon =

Native American collegiate fraternity

- ΒΣΕ
- Coat of Arms of Beta Sigma Epsilon
- Founded: February 9, 2000; 26 years ago University of Arizona
- Type: Social
- Affiliation: Independent
- Status: Active
- Emphasis: Multi-cultural -Native Americans
- Scope: Regional
- Motto: "Unity, Pride, Honor!"
- Colors: Maroon and Silver
- Philanthropy: Walk to Cure Diabetes
- Chapters: 4
- Nickname: Beta Sig
- Headquarters: Beta Sigma Epsilon c/o Alpha chapter 1303 E. University Blvd. #20941; Tucson, Arizona 85719; United States

The Order of Beta Sigma Epsilon (ΒΣΕ) is a Native American regional collegiate social fraternity. It was established in 2000 at the University of Arizona in Tucson, Arizona.

== History ==
The Order of Beta Sigma Epsilon fraternity was established as a fraternity for Native Americans at the University of Arizona in Tucson, Arizona on February 9, 2000. Its founders were Nathan Pryor (Navajo) and Eric Riggs (Navajo).

The fraternity was established to promote scholarship, brotherhood, and community service, especially increasing the retention of Native American males at the University of Arizona and improving Native American communities near the campus. The fraternity also had the goal of expanding to other campuses, becoming the first national Native American fraternity in the United States.

The first pledge class at the University of Arizona was initiated in the fall of 2000, composed of Garrett Curley (Navajo), Joshua Lucio (Zuni), and Craig Wood (Navajo). The university recognized the fraternity in February 2001. It then assisted with the formation of Alpha Pi Omega, a Native American sorority, at the University of Arizona. In the spring semester of 2004, it expanded to the University of New Mexico with the Gamma chapter.

A second chaper was established at Northern Arizona University on January 31, 2004.

== Symbols ==
Beta Sigma Epsilon's motto is "Unity, Pride, Honor!" The Greek letters ΒΣΕ have a special meaning that is only known to its members. Its colors are maroon and silver. The fraternity's nickname is Beta Sig.

== Philanthropy ==
Beta Sigma Epsilon's national philanthropy is Walk to Cure Diabetes. This charity was selected because diabetes disproportionately impacts Native Americans.

== Membership ==
Membership in the fraternity is open to males of all races.

== Chapters ==
Chapter	Charter date and range	Institution	Location	Status	Ref.
Alpha	February 9, 2000	University of Arizona	Tucson, Arizona	Active	
Beta	January 31, 2004	Northern Arizona University	Flagstaff, Arizona	Active	
Gamma	November 18, 2005	University of New Mexico	Albuquerque, New Mexico	Active	
Delta	2010	California State Polytechnic University, Humboldt	Arcata, California	Active	

== See also ==
- Cultural interest fraternities and sororities
- List of social fraternities and sororities
