= Phi Sigma Chi Multicultural Fraternity =

American college fraternity

Phi Sigma Chi
- ΦΣΧ
- Coat of Arms of Phi Sigma Chi
- Founded: November 16, 1996; 29 years ago New York City College of Technology
- Type: Social
- Affiliation: NMGC
- Status: Active
- Emphasis: Multicultural
- Scope: National
- Motto: "We are bound by nothing, for Phi is the limit"
- Colors: Crimson and Gold
- Mascot: Eternal phoenix
- Philanthropy: Sickle Cell Awareness, 363 Campaign, Network for Success Program
- Chapters: 5 active
- Colonies: 2
- Nickname: Phi, Phi Men, The Distinguished Gentlemen
- Headquarters: United States
- Website: phisigmachi.com

Phi Sigma Chi Multicultural Fraternity, Inc. (ΦΣΧ) is an American college fraternity founded in 1996 at the New York City College of Technology in Brooklyn, New York. The fraternity has established fourteen collegiate chapters. It is a member of the National Multicultural Greek Council.

== History ==
Phi Sigma Chi Multicultural Fraternity was founded at the New York City College of Technology in Brooklyn, New York, on November 16, 1996. Phi Sigma Chi was founded by Founding Fathers Heraldo Gabriel, Carlos Lopez, Archer Hutchinson, Steven Lee, Noah Rodriguez, and Marvin Simon. Its mission was "to direct members toward a consciousness of their lifetime responsibility of helping others".

Initially, the fraternity remained independent. In 1998, it became a founding member of the National Multicultural Greek Council. The fraternity added two additional chapters in New York state, including Beta at Brooklyn College in 1998 and Gamma at the John Jay College of Criminal Justice in 2001.

The fraternity became international with the establishment of a chapter in Trinidad and Tobago in 2010. In the United States, its first chapter outside of New York City was Iota at Buffalo State University in 2013, followed by its first chapter outside of New York state at the University of Virginia in 2013 and Lehigh University in 2021. In total, Phi Sigma Chi has chartered 13 collegiate chapters and one alumni chapter.

Phi Sigma Chi is a member of the National Multicultural Greek Council.

== Symbols ==
Phi Sigma Chi's motto is "We are bound by nothing, for Phi is the limit". The fraternity's call is "Phiii! Yo!". Its colors are crimson and gold. Its mascot is the eternal phoenix. Its nicknames are Phi, Phi Men, and the Distinguished Gentlemen.

== Activities ==
The fraternity promotes the understanding and celebration of multiculturalism by hosting forums on various aspects of race. It also sponsors a national strolling team, The PhiNasty Stroll Team.

== Philanthropy ==
Phi Sigma Chi members participate in community beautification efforts and provide leadership programs for at-risk youths. Its Beautification Project aims to improve community gardens, parks, playgrounds, and other shared spaces.

Phi Sigma Chi's 363 Campaign addresses food insecurity and homelessness outside of the traditional holiday season. Its Network for Success is a lealdership development initiative hosted aimed at equipping students and young leaders with career readiness skills.

The fraternity also has an ongoing campaign for sickle cell anemia awareness. Additionally, members participate in Adopt-a-Highway, the AIDS Walk, and the MS Walk.

== Chapters ==
Following are the fraternity's chapters, with active chapters indicated in bold and inactive chapters indicated in italics.

| Chapter | Charter date and range | Institution | Location | Status | Ref. |
|---|---|---|---|---|---|
| Alpha | November 16, 1996 – 202x ? | New York City College of Technology | Brooklyn, New York | Inactive | |
| **Beta** | 1998 | Brooklyn College | Brooklyn, New York | Active | |
| Gamma | 2001–20xx ? | John Jay College of Criminal Justice | New York City, New York | Inactive | |
| Delta | 2011–201x ? | York College, City University of New York | Jamaica, Queens, New York | Inactive | |
| Epsilon | 2011–20xx ? | York College, City University of New York | Jamaica, Queens, New York | Inactive | |
| Zeta | 2010–201x ? | College of Staten Island | Staten Island, New York | Inactive | |
| Eta | 2011–201x ? | University of Trinidad and Tobago | Wallerfield, Tunapuna–Piarco, Trinidad and Tobago | Inactive | (Note: At one point, this was a community-based chapter in Pleasantville, Trinidad & Tobago. It is also listed as the Epsilon chapter.) |
| Theta | 2013–20xx ? | Lehman College | Bronx, New York | Inactive | |
| Theta | 2013–20xx ? | Monroe College | Bronx, New York | Inactive | |
| **Iota** | 2013 | Buffalo State University | Buffalo, New York | Active | |
| **Kappa** | 2013–20xx ? | University of Virginia | Charlottesville, Virginia | Colony | |
| Lambda | 2015–20xx ? | State University of New York at New Paltz | New Paltz, New York | Inactive | |
| **Mu** | 2021 | Lehigh University | Bethlehem, Pennsylvania | Active | |
| **Nu** | 2024 | Lafayette College | Easton, Pennsylvania | Active | |
| **Omega** | | | | Memorial | |
| **Pi Alpha** | 2024 | NYC Alumni | New York City, New York | Active | |
| **Metro colony** | | Various colleges of the Greater New York City Area | Greater New York City, New York | Colony | (Note: Colony was established in 2009.) |

== See also ==
- Cultural interest fraternities and sororities
