= Sigma Omicron Epsilon =

Native American college sorority

- ΣΟΕ
- Founded: March 30, 1997; 29 years ago East Carolina University
- Type: Social
- Affiliation: Independent
- Status: Active
- Emphasis: Native American, Cultural interest
- Scope: Local
- Colors: Yellow, White and Blue
- Symbol: Butterfly
- Flower: Yellow Rose
- Publication: The Butterfly Bulletin
- Philanthropy: Breast cancer awareness and education
- Chapters: 3
- Nickname: SOE
- Headquarters: PO Box 30458; Greenville, North Carolina 27833; United States
- Website: sigmaomicronepsilon.org

Sigma Omicron Epsilon, Inc. (ΣΟΕ), also known as SOE, is a Native American sorority founded in 1997 at East Carolina University in Greenville, North Carolina. It is one of eight fraternities and sororities across the United States that are considered historically Native American.

== History ==
Sigma Omicron Epsilon was founded on March 30, 1997, on the campus of East Carolina University by seven Native American women. Its founders envisioned a sisterhood that promoted Native American culture and education, as well as a network for its members. Any women with an interest in Native American culture are eligible for membership.

The sorority's founders were Deidre Arlene Jacobs-Blanks, Jolena Bullard, Berna Linette Chavis, Cabrina Lynne Cummings, Candance Holona Hammonds, Patrice Henderson, and Una Gail Locklear.

== Symbols ==
Sigma Omicron Epsilon's colors are blue, white, and yellow. Its flower is the yellow rose and its symbol is the butterfly.

== Activities ==
The sorority's national philanthropy is breast cancer awareness and education. Its members participate in the Susan G. Komen Race for the Cure and a variety of fundraisers. It also offers a scholarship to a female student attending its chapter institutions. In 2019, the East Carolina chapter co-sponsored the My Culture is Not a Costume campaign. The chapters also bring Native American speakers to campus.

== Chapters ==
Following is a list of Sigma Omicron Epsilon chapters. Active chapters are indicated in bold. Inactive chapters are in italics.

Chapter	Chartered	Institution	Location	Status	Reference
**Alpha**	March 30, 1997	East Carolina University	Greenville, North Carolina	Active	
**Beta**	2004	North Carolina State University	Raleigh, North Carolina	Active	
**Gamma**	January 2007	University of North Carolina at Pembroke	Pembroke, North Carolina	Active	
**Graduate**	2011			Active	

== See also ==
- List of social sororities and women's fraternities
- Cultural interest fraternities and sororities
