= Delta Xi Phi =

American multicultural collegiate sorority

- ΔΞΦ
- Founded: April 20, 1994; 32 years ago University of Illinois at Urbana-Champaign
- Type: Social
- Affiliation: NMGC
- Status: Active
- Emphasis: Multicultural
- Scope: National
- Motto: "What is possible has been done, what is impossible must be done"
- Pillars: Increasing Multicultural Awareness, Community Service, Advancement of Women through Higher Education, Sisterhood, and Friendship
- Colors: Navy blue and maroon
- Flower: Yellow Rose of Texas
- Jewel: White Diamond
- Mascot: White Bengal Tiger
- Philanthropy: American Cancer Society
- Chapters: 23
- Nickname: Di Xi, Di Xi Phi, DXP
- Headquarters: P.O. Box 151; Chicago Ridge, Illinois 60415; United States
- Website: www.deltaxiphi.com

Delta Xi Phi (ΔΞΦ) is an American multicultural sorority that was founded at the University of Illinois at Urbana-Champaign in 1994. It has expanded to include 23 chapters in the United States. Delta Xi Phi is one of the founding members of the National Multicultural Greek Council (NMGC).

== History ==
Delta Xi Phi sorority was founded on April 20, 1994, on the University of Illinois at Urbana-Champaign (UIUC) campus, by fifteen young women. They recognized a need for an organization that appreciated the different cultures present on their college campuses. Multicultural awareness, as well as community service, empowerment of women in higher education, friendship, and sisterhood, were also important aspects of Delta Xi Phi.

The fifteen founders, known as "Diamantes", are as follows:

- Amani Abukhdeir
- Hanadi Abu-khdeir
- Lynette E. Alvarado
- Erma L. Alvarez
- Yvonne E. Alvarez
- Monica Arciga
- Maria G. Barrera
- Maria Teresa Botello
- Aida Derat
- Leticia Escamilla
- Christine Lopez
- Elia Morales
- Carla Ortega
- Alma Rivera
- Nancy Tsao

In the spring of 1992, two different groups of women were seeking to establish a new sorority at UIUC learned of each other's intentions. The two groups organized a meeting where they discussed their goals and aspirations. They surprisingly overlapped and so these women unanimously decided to work together toward their common goal and the two groups merged. They decided to temporarily call themselves "Women for the Advancement of a Multicultural Society" (WAMS). Several sororities on other college campuses were contacted to establish a chapter at the University of Illinois campus. However, none of those had everything that was wanted by WAMS.

Finally, on April 20, 1993, after almost a year of searching for a sorority and much frustration, the women of WAMS decided to stop looking for other sororities and commence their quest of founding their own. Three women from WAMS were designated pledge educators and helped the other twelve women's dream of founding a sorority become a reality. They went through a year-long pledging process during which they developed a strong bond of sisterhood.

The foundation of their sorority began with meetings where they discussed and voted upon its letters, colors, mascot, flower, and stone. On April 20, 1994, the members of WAMS were no longer just the women of WAMS; they were to be forever known as the founding mothers of Delta Xi Phi Multicultural Sorority. On February 6, 1998, Delta Xi Phi Sorority became an incorporated entity.

== Symbols ==
Delta Xi Phi's motto is "What is possible has been done, what is impossible must be done". The sorority's five pillars are the Advancement of Women through Higher Education, Community Service, Increasing Multicultural Awareness, Sisterhood, and Friendship.

Delta XI Phi's colors are navy blue and maroon. Its flower is the Yellow Rose of Texas. Its jewel is the white diamond. Its mascot is the White Bengal tiger.

== Membership ==
The sorority welcomes women from all ethnic, cultural, religious, and socio-economic backgrounds.

== Chapters ==
Over the years, DXP has grown with six chapters, seventeen associate chapters, one colony, and three interest groups. Delta Xi Phi's interest groups are known as "WAMS" – Women for the Advancement of a Multicultural Society. Active chapters and associate chapters are indicated in bold; inactive chapters and associate chapters are indicated in italics.

Chapter	Charter date and range	Institution	Location	Status	Ref.
**Alpha**	April 20, 1994 – xxxx ?; 20xx ?	University of Illinois Urbana-Champaign	Champaign and Urbana, IL	Inactive	
**Beta**	August 14, 1998	California State University, Chico	Chico, CA	Active	
**Gamma associate**	December 4, 1998	Mississippi State University	Starkville, MI	Active	
**Delta**	May 8, 1999	University of Illinois at Chicago	Chicago, IL	Active	
**Epsilon associate**	June 7, 1999 – 20xx ?; 20xx ?	University of California, Los Angeles	Los Angeles, CA	Inactive	
**Zeta associate**	February 5, 2000 – 20xx ?; 20xx ?	Southern Illinois University	Carbondale, IL	Inactive	
**Eta**	February 5, 2000	Marquette University	Milwaukee, WI	Active	
**Iota**	March 21, 2002	University of Massachusetts Amherst	Amherst, MA	Active	
**Kappa associate**	May 3, 2003 – 20xx ?; 20xx ?	University of Alabama, Tuscaloosa	Tuscaloosa, AL	Inactive	
**Lambda**	June 7, 2003	Johns Hopkins University	Baltimore, MD	Active	(Note: Started as a colony in 2002.)
**Mu associate**	June 5, 2004	University of California, Davis	Davis, CA	Active	
**Nu associate**	January 15, 2005 – 20xx ?; 20xx ?	Michigan State University	East Lansing, MI	Inactive	
**Xi**	March 11, 2006 – 20xx ?; 20xx ?	Bowling Green State University	Bowling Green, OH	Inactive	
**Omicron associate**	May 13, 2006 – 20xx ?; 20xx ?	Rockhurst University	Kansas City, MO	Active	
**Pi associate**	June 10, 2006 – 20xx ?; 20xx ?	State University of New York at Old Westbury	Long Island, NY	Active	
**Rho**	April 21, 2007	University of New Hampshire	Durham, NH	Active	
**Sigma associate**	May 6, 2007	Valparaiso University	Valparaiso, IN	Active	
**Tau associate**	May 17, 2008 – 20xx ?	—	Los Angeles, CA	Active	
**Upsilon**	January 10, 2009	Keene State College	Keene, NH	Active	(Note: Established by absorbing Eta Gamma Chi, founded in 1976.)
**Phi**	March 7, 2009	Ohio State University	Columbus, OH	Active	
**Chi associate**	May 1, 2010	Cabrini University	Radnor Township, PA	Inactive	
**Psi associate**	December 17, 2011	Wake Forest University	Winston-Salem, NC	Active	
**Omega associate**	May 5, 2012	Samford University	Homewood, AL	Active	
**Alpha Alpha associate**	May 2, 2016	University of California, Berkeley	Berkeley, CA	Active	
**Alpha Beta associate**	2020	Salisbury University	Salisbury, MD	Active	
**Alpha Gamma associate**	2025	Hartwick College	Oneonta, NY		
Colony		Washington State University	Pullman, WA	Active	
Interest group		Loyola Marymount University	Los Angeles, CA	Active	
Interest group		University of Oregon	Eugene, OR	Active	

== See also ==
- Cultural interest fraternities and sororities
- List of social sororities and women's fraternities
