= Zeta Omega Eta =

American collegiate sorority

- ΖΩΗ
- Founded: 2003; 23 years ago Trinity College
- Type: Social
- Affiliation: Independent
- Status: Active
- Emphasis: Feminism
- Scope: Regional
- Colors: Purple and white
- Chapters: 2
- Nickname: Zeta
- Headquarters: Hartford, Connecticut; United States
- Website: Trinity (Alpha chapter); Michigan (Beta chapter)

Zeta Omega Eta (ΖΩΗ) is an American feminist collegiate sorority. It was founded at Trinity College in Hartford, Connecticut in 2003. It was one of the first feminist sororities in the United States and is gender inclusive.

== History ==
Sophomore roommates Meghan Boone and Anne-Louise Marquis started Zeta Omega Eta at Trinity College in Hartford, Connecticut in 2003. Zeta Omega Eta was established as a coed feminist sorority that would not have the exclusivity of typical Greek letter sororities. They decided to use the title "sorority" as a way to reclaim the word. The sorority seeks "diversity, inclusiveness, and the advancement of feminist ideas". It was one of the first feminist sororities in the United States.

By 2006, the Alpha chapter at Trinity had initiated 56 male and female students who are all called "sisters". Its members decided to remain a local sorority, independent of a national organization to retain control and to keep dues low.

A second chapter, Beta, was established in the fall of 2015 by sophomore Courtney Cook, at the University of Michigan in Ann Arbor, Michigan. Cook learned about Zeta Omega Eta when looking for a feminist organization that met her interests. The two chapters have slightly different constitutions but are part of the same organization, being connected by a feminist ideology. Beta is less focused on politics, with an emphasis on "sisterhood".

== Symbols ==
The sorority's colors are purple and white. Its Greek letters, ΖΩΗ, were selected to spell the Greek word for life. Its nickname is Zeta.

== Activities ==
Zeta Omega Eta's members volunteer for charitable organizations and to advance feminist ideals. The sorority's chapters conduct at least two community service projects each semester. The sorority's members have participated in AIDS Walk, collected school supplies, and volunteered at a nursing home. The sorority also supported a production of The Vagina Monologues. Members have also raised funds for the HER Foundation.

== Membership ==
Membership in Zeta Omega Eta is open to all students, both male and female. All members are called sisters. Potential members should be interested in feminism, gender equity, and advancing diversity and inclusivity on campus. The sorority has a "Support a Sister" program that helps members who cannot afford dues.

== Chapters ==
Chapter	Charter date	Institution	Location	Status	Ref.
Alpha	2003-20xx ?; 20xx ?	Trinity College	Hartford, Connecticut,	Active	
Beta	2015	University of Michigan	Ann Arbor, Michigan	Active	
