= Gamma Eta =

American multicultural collegiate sorority

- ΓΗ
- Founded: October 18, 1995; 30 years ago University of Florida
- Type: Social
- Affiliation: NMGC
- Status: Active
- Emphasis: Multicultural
- Scope: National
- Motto: Hoy y Siempre "Today and Always"
- Pillars: Sisterhood, Strength, Unity, Diversity, Scholarship, Leadership, Service
- Colors: Purple and Teal
- Symbol: Sun and Fleur de Lis
- Flower: Sunflower
- Publication: The Sunrise
- Philanthropy: Breast Cancer Awareness
- Chapters: 8
- Headquarters: P.O. Box 427; Tempe, Arizona 85280; United States
- Website: www.gammaetasorority.org

Gamma Eta (ΓΗ) is an American multicultural collegiate sorority. It formed at the University of Florida in 1995 and was the first sorority created in the State of Florida. It was chartered and incorporated in 1999. Gamma Eta is a member of the National Multicultural Greek Council.

== History ==
Eighteen women created Gamma Eta Society at the University of Florida in Gainesville on October 18, 1995 under the leadership of Ilena Camilo. In the years leading up to 1995, there were many questions regarding the role of the Latino community at the University of Florida. There was a low retention rate for Latino students and a large cultural disconnect at the campus. In direct response to those issues, the Founding Mothers led the efforts to create a sorority for women of diverse backgrounds to provide a social and academic support system.

The founders of Gamma Eta were:

- Giselle Arvelo
- Alexa Davila
- Ana Del Valle
- Vivian Estalella
- Claudia Forestieri
- Beatriz Lugo
- Deborah Mazzeo
- Diana O'Hara
- Leemarie Ortiz
- Maria Portilla
- Diana Ramirez
- Marena Ramirez
- Vanessa Ramirez
- Adnybel Rosario-Ortiz
- Joann Schadenfroh
- Maria Torres
- Yahdira Torres

The founders initiated the first class in the spring of 1996. The sorority was chartered and incorporated on August 2, 1999. It was admitted to the local Multicultural Greek Council as an associate member on November 22, 1999. The sorority was chartered and incorporated on August 2, 1999.

In 2004, it added the Beta chapter at the University of North Florida. This was followed by Gamma at the University of Arkansas in 2005. As of 2024, the sorority has seven chapters.

Gamma Eta became a full member of the National Multicultural Greek Council in 2006.

== Symbols ==
Gamma Eta Society's mottos is Hoy y Siempre or "Today and Always". Its symbols are the sun and fleur-de-lis. Its flower is the sunflower. Its colors are purple and teal. The sorority's crest is purple, featuring a teal chevron with seven yellow stars, the fleur-de-lis and sunflower above the chevron, and the sun below the chevron.

The sorority's pillars are Sisterhood, Strength, Unity, Diversity, Scholarship, Leadership, and Service: Gamma Eta's publication is The Sunrise.

== Membership ==
Gamma Eta is composed of college-educated women of diverse cultural backgrounds, including Caucasian, Hispanic, African, Asian, Middle Eastern (West Asia), and Indian.

== Philanthropy ==
Gamma Eta's national philanthropy is breast cancer awareness through its official partnership with the National Breast Cancer Foundation. Individual chapters at the collegiate and alumnae levels also support secondary philanthropy.

== Chapters ==
=== Collegiate chapters ===
Follow is a list of Gamma Eta collegiate chapters. Active chapters are noted in bold, and inactive chapters are noted in italics.

Chapter	Charter date and range	Institution	Location	Status	Ref.
**Alpha**	October 18, 1995	University of Florida	Gainesville, Florida	Active	
**Beta**	2004	University of North Florida	Jacksonville, Florida	Active	
**Gamma**	2005	University of Arkansas	Fayetteville, Arkansas	Active	
**Delta**	2006	Jacksonville University	Jacksonville, Florida	Active	
**Epsilon**	2009	University of Arkansas–Fort Smith	Fort Smith, Arkansas	Active	
Zeta	2009–20xx ?	University of Georgia	Athens, Georgia	Inactive	
**Eta**	2014	Indiana University–Purdue University Indiana	Indianapolis, Indiana	Active	
**Theta**	2017	St. John's University, Staten Island Campus	Staten Island, New York	Active	

=== Alumnae chapters ===
Active chapters are noted in bold, and inactive chapters are noted in italics.

Chapter	Charter date	Location	Status	Ref.
Alpha Chi Alpha		Greater Miami, Florida	Active	
Alpha Chi Beta		North Florida	Active	
Alpha Chi Gamma		Orlando, Florida	Active	
Alpha Chi Delta		Northwest Arkansas	Active	
Alpha Chi Epsilon		Washington, D.C.	Active	
Alpha Chi Zeta		Gainesville, Florida	Active	

== See also ==
- List of social sororities and women's fraternities
