= Alpha Lambda Mu =

American Muslim collegiate fraternity

- ΑΛΜ ألم
- Founded: February 12, 2013; 13 years ago University of Texas at Dallas
- Type: Social
- Affiliation: Independent
- Status: Active
- Emphasis: Islam
- Scope: National
- Colors: Maroon, Gold, and White
- Chapters: 6 active, 11 chartered
- Colonies: 1
- Headquarters: Richardson, Texas 75081; United States
- Website: alphalambdamu.org

Alpha Lambda Mu (ΑΛΜ) (ألم: Alif Laam Meem in Arabic) is the first national Muslim fraternity in America. It was established in 2013 at the University of Texas at Dallas as a social fraternity with an emphasis on community service.

== History ==
Ali Mahmoud founded Alpha Lambda Mu at the University of Texas at Dallas in February 2013. At the time Mahmoud was a nineteen-year-old junior; he is also a first-generation Egyptian-American. Mahmoud created Alpha Lambda Mu as a social fraternity "to offer Muslim students the chance to express both sides of their identity, the American and the Muslim" Araf Hossain was the fraternity's co-founder.

Mahmoud and Hossain formed a council with other interested Muslims. On February 13, 2013, the council sent invitations to students they believed would be interested in joining the new fraternity. Later that month, seventeen members were admitted with a ceremony that included being knighted with a red kufi cap and donating a $100 initiation fee to a charity. Collectively, these seventeen members were called the Kufi Krew. Its first rush was held in September 2013; forty men rushed the fraternity and twenty were offered bids.

The fraternity became national in 2014 with the addition of Beta chapter at the University of California, San Diego and Gamma chapter at Cornell University. Rumzi Khan was the founder of the Beta chapter. As it expanded, the fraternity was somewhat controversial; Mahmoud noted, "We’ve gotten fire from the Islamaphobes saying that we’re a sleeper cell, we’ve gotten fire from the super-progressive Muslims saying that we’re rooted in a white elitist organization that’s trying to take control of Islam and put on misogynistic ideals again."

As of fall 2020, the fraternity has six active chapters and two colonies. On some campuses, the fraternity is a member of the Interfraternity Council. The fraternity is governed by its National Shura; it also has an advisory board.

== Symbols ==
The fraternity's Greek letters ΑΛΜ are the phonetic equivalent of Alif Laam Meem, three Arabic letters that start chapters of the Quran. Its members wear a red kufi cap. The fraternity's badge is a silver Sandala pin that features its logo. The colors are Maroon, Gold and White.

== Membership ==
Its members are Muslim or non-Muslims who share the same ideas, regardless of sexual orientation. Its members come from a variety of backgrounds including American, Egyptian, Arab, Somalian, Pakistani, and Bengali.

== Activities ==
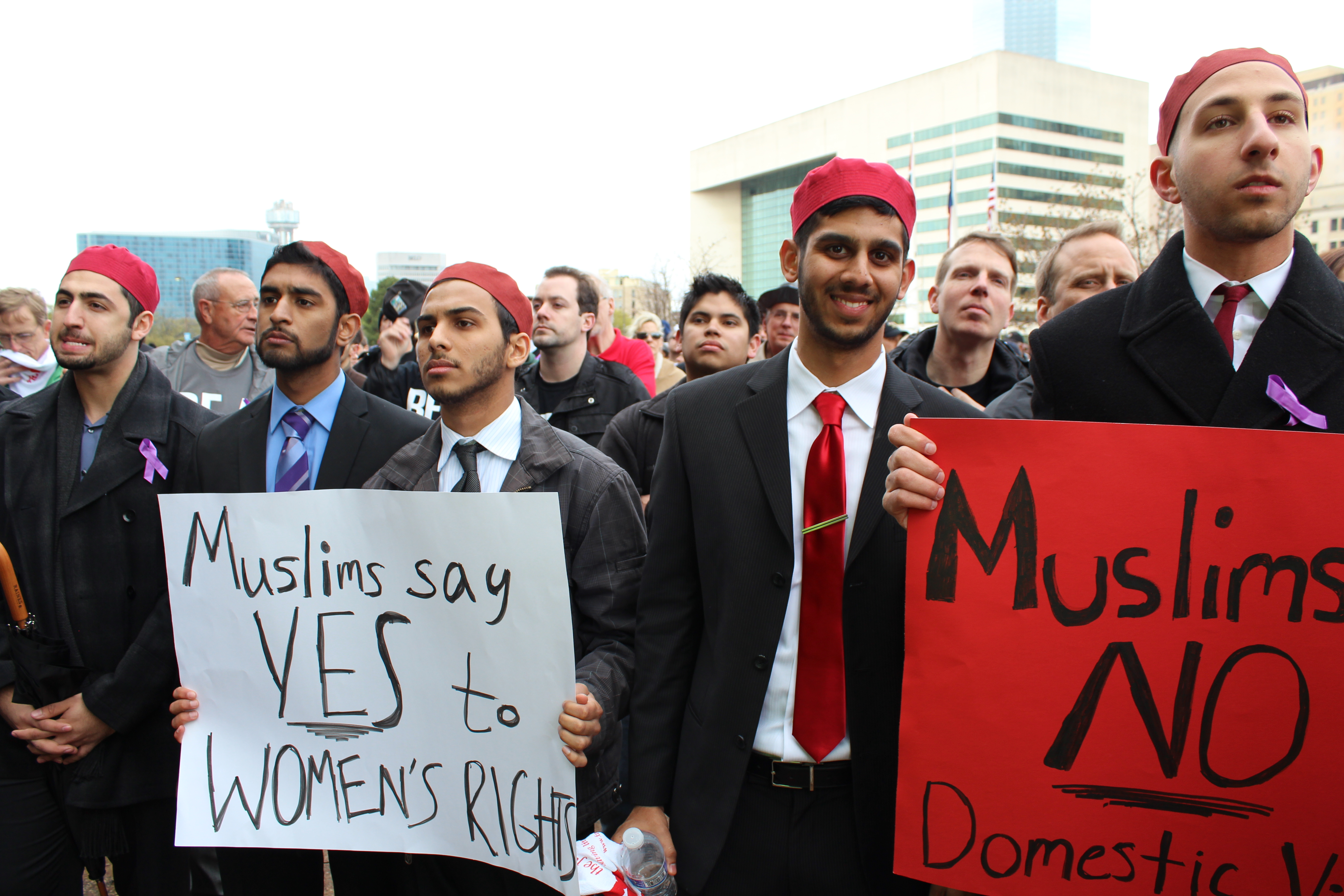
Fraternity members at a Dallas protest against domestic violence in March 2013.

Because of its affiliation with Islam, Alpha Lambda Mu is atypical of most social collegiate Greek letter organizations; it prohibits alcohol, hazing, most co-ed events, adultery, or fornication. Some of its activities incorporate an imam for lectures and prayers. Its service activities include picking up litter, distributing water to the homeless, and a nationwide campaign raising funds and combating domestic violence. The Alpha chapter has provided food and supplies after a fertilizer plant explosion in West, Texas and helped clean up after tornados in Moore, Oklahoma.

The fraternity has taken a position "against domestic violence, fair trade violations, or any other form of oppression." It hosts a four-day Akhtober event that benefits local shelters and transitional homes for women. On March 24, 2013, Alpha chapter confronted negative stereotypes of Muslim Men when they joined a protest against domestic violence in Dallas, Texas. Photos of fraternity members carrying signs that read, "Muslims Say No to Domestic Violence" and "Muslims Say Yes to Women's Rights" went viral on the Internet and was covered by national news.

The Alpha Lambda Mu Foundation was established as a 501(c)3 charity in 2019.

== Chapters ==
Following is a list of Alpha Lambda Mu chapters. Active chapters are indicated in bold. Inactive chapters are indicated in italics.

Chapter	Charter date and range	Institution	Location	Status	Ref.
**Grand Alpha**	February 13, 2013	University of Texas at Dallas	Dallas, Texas	Active	
**Beta**	2014	University of California, San Diego	San Diego, California	Active	
Gamma	2014–20xx ?	Cornell University	Ithaca, New York	Inactive	
Delta	201x ?–20xx ?	San Diego State University	San Diego, California	Inactive	
Epsilon	201x–20xx ?	University of Texas at Arlington	Arlington, California	Inactive	
Zeta	2016–20xx ?	Pennsylvania State University	University Park, Pennsylvania	Inactive	
**Eta**	201x ?	University of Toledo	Toledo, Ohio	Active	
**Theta**	2019	University of Wisconsin–Madison	Madison, Wisconsin	Active	
Iota	2020–202x ?	Texas Tech University	Lubbock, Texas	Inactive	
**Kappa**	2020	University of Texas at Austin	Austin, Texas	Active	
**Lambda**	2021	Arizona State University	Tempe, Arizona	Active	
Colony	2017–20xx ?	University of California, Los Angeles	Los Angeles, California	Inactive ?	
Colony	2017–20xx ?	East Carolina University	Greenville, North Carolina	Inactive ?	
Colony	2017–20xx ?	University of California, Irvine	Irvine, California	Inactive ?	
Colony	2017–20xx ?	Miami University	Oxford, Ohio	Inactive ?	
Colony	2017–20xx ?	University of Oklahoma	Norman, Oklahoma	Inactive ?	
Colony	20xx ?–20xx ?	San Jose State University	San Jose, California	Inactive	(Note: This chapter was suspended or never recognized by San José State University or its national office for hazing, violence, or inappropriate chapter management practices.)
**Colony**	2023	Ohio State University	Columbus, Ohio	Active	

== Popular culture ==
In June 2022. Dylan Hollingsworth (videographer) and Wheeler Sparks (director) released Kufi Krew: An American Story, a documentary about the fraternity. The documentary's name refers to a former YouTube channel where fraternity brother's posted humorous videos. The film's creators, who are not members of the fraternity, started working on the project in 2013. Hollingsworth said, "We knew that this community was a really powerful vehicle through which you could examine the Muslim American identity and maybe answer some questions for people who really don’t know a lot about that."

== See also ==
- Muslim Student Association
- Cultural interest fraternities and sororities
- List of social fraternities
