= Zeta Sigma Chi =

American multicultural college sorority

- ΖΣΧ
- Founded: March 3, 1991; 35 years ago Northern Illinois University
- Type: Social
- Affiliation: Independent
- Status: Active
- Emphasis: Multicultural
- Scope: National
- Motto: "Keeping the Dream Alive"
- Pillars: Education, Success, Culture, Service, and Sisterhood
- Colors: Peach and Black
- Symbol: Unicorn
- Flower: Peach Rose
- Philanthropy: Ronald McDonald House Charities, National Association of Multicultural Education
- Chapters: 4 active
- Nickname: Z-Chis
- Headquarters: 3198 S. Grand Boulevard; St. Louis, Missouri 63118; United States
- Website: zetasigmachi.com

Zeta Sigma Chi (ΖΣΧ) (also known as Z-Chis, pronounced "Zeek eyes") is a multicultural American sorority founded in 1991 at the Northern Illinois University in DeKalb, Illinois. It was the third national multicultural organization founded in the United States.

== History ==
On March 3, 1991, Zeta Sigma Chi Multicultural Sorority Inc. was established at Northern Illinois University by eight founding members known as the Mommy Chis. The Mommy Chis are Maribel Campa, Zandra Cortes, Sandra de la Roca, Veronica Escobar, Sandra Gomez, Jacqueline Herrera, Laura Murillo, and Julie Sanders.

Zeta Sigma Chi is based upon five principles. The organization's principles are education, success, culture, service, and sisterhood, with an emphasis on social justice.

The Oakland University Office for Student Involvement selected its Zeta Sigma Chi chapter as the Fraternity & Sorority Life Organization of the Year for the 2019–2020 academic year.

== Symbols ==
Zeta Sigma Chi's colors are peach and black. Its flower is the peach rose and its symbol is the unicorn. Its motto is "Keeping the Dream Alive." Its principles or pillars are Education, Success, Culture, Service, and Sisterhood.

== Activities ==
The sorority's philanthropies are the Ronald McDonald House Charities and the National Association for Multicultural Education (NAME). The Eastern Michigan University chapter hosts an annual SexapalooZa to encourage positive discussion and education about healthy and safe sex. The University of Michigan chapter held a workshop to discuss homophobia in the Greek system.

== Chapters ==
Following are the chapters of Zeta Sigma Chi, with active chapters indicated in bold and inactive chapters in italics.

Chapter	Charter date and range	Institution	Location	Status	Ref.
Alpha	March 3, 1991 – 20xx ?	Northern Illinois University	DeKalb, Illinois	Inactive	
**Beta**	June 4, 1994	University of Wisconsin–Whitewater	Whitewater, Wisconsin	Active	
Gamma	November 19, 1995 – 20xx ?	Purdue University Northwest	Calumet, Indiana	Inactive	
Delta	March 31, 1996 – 20xx ?	Michigan State University	East Lansing, Michigan	Inactive	
Epsilon	November 14, 1999 – 20xx ?	University of Michigan	Ann Arbor, Michigan	Inactive	
Zeta	June 30, 2001 – 20xx ?	Towson University	Towson, Maryland	Inactive	
Eta	March 29, 2003 – 20xx ?	University of Texas at Austin	Austin, Texas	Inactive	
Theta	May 2, 2004 – 20xx ?	University of Maryland, Baltimore County	Catonsville, Maryland	Inactive	
Iota	April 24, 2005 – 20xx ?	Shippensburg University	Shippensburg, Pennsylvania	Inactive	
Kappa	July 30, 2005 – 20xx ?	Wayne State University	Detroit, Michigan	Inactive	
**Lambda**	September 10, 2005	Oakland University	Oakland County, Michigan	Active	
Mu	June 25, 2006 – 20xx ?	University of Wisconsin–Parkside	Kenosha, Wisconsin	inactive	
Nu	April 15, 2007 – 20xx ?	Purdue University	West Lafayette, Indiana	Inactive	
Xi	February 24, 2008 – 20xx ?	University of Pittsburgh	Pittsburgh, Pennsylvania	Inactive	
Omicron	March 29, 2008 – 20xx ?	Eastern Michigan University	West Lafayette, Indiana	Inactive	
**Pi**	May 1, 2011	California State University, Sacramento	Sacramento, California	Inactive	
Rho	August 21, 2010 – 20xx ?	University of South Carolina	Columbia, South Carolina	Inactive	
Sigma	May 19, 2013 – 20xx ?	University of California, Davis	Davis, California	Inactive	
**Tau**	April 13, 2014	University of Wisconsin–Milwaukee	Milwaukee, Wisconsin	Active	
Upsilon	April 16, 2017 – 20xx ?	California State University, East Bay	Hayward, California	Inactive	
**Omega**	June 26, 2021			Memorial	

== See also ==
- List of social sororities and women's fraternities
- Cultural interest fraternities and sororities
