= Theta Nu Xi =

American multicultural college sorority

- ΘΝΞ
- Founded: April 11, 1997; 28 years ago University of North Carolina at Chapel Hill
- Type: Social
- Affiliation: NMGC
- Status: Active
- Emphasis: Multicultural
- Scope: National
- Motto: "Sisters of Diversity, Together as ONE"
- Pillars: Scholarship, Service, Sisterhood, Leadership, and Multiculturalism
- Colors: Black, Lavender, and Carolina blue
- Symbol: Butterfly
- Flower: Sterling Silver Rose
- Mascot: Tiger swallowtail
- Philanthropy: Girl Up
- Chapters: 61
- Nickname: Butterflies, Bad Butterflies
- Headquarters: 749 Maury Avenue; Norfolk, Virginia 23517; United States
- Website: www.thetanuxi.org

Theta Nu Xi Multicultural Sorority, Inc. (ΘΝΞ) is an American historically multicultural sorority founded on April 11, 1997, at the University of North Carolina at Chapel Hill (UNC). Theta Nu Xi was incorporated on April 29, 1999.

== History ==
Theta Nu Xi was founded during a time when cultural Greek organizations began to proliferate on campuses across the United States. Theta Nu Xi was the first multicultural sorority founded in the Southeastern United States. The sorority has since grown to more than sixty chapters and kaleidoscopes in over twenty years of existence.

In the Spring of 1996, Melissa Jo Murchison-Blake sought a sisterhood that openly embraced all women and crossed cultural boundaries. As a bi-racial woman, she did not want to choose between historically Caucasian or African-American sororities. Murchison-Blake felt that if she did choose one, she would be denying half of her heritage.

Murchison-Blake recruited six other women who would become the national founders of Theta Nu Xi Multicultural Sorority, Inc. The founders were Geeta Nadia Kapur, Natalie Nicole Barker, Peggy Virginia Long, Melissa Jo Murchison-Blake, Brenda Imade Eribo, Katherine Ellen Stanley, and Janelle Kalia Poe.

In the early days of its existence, the sorority met resistance from its campus of founding. The director of Greek Affairs at the University of North Carolina at Chapel Hill advised the national founders to consider joining an existing organization, expressing his concern that a new Greek organization based on the principle of multiculturalism, would not survive at UNC. Despite such resistance, the national founders' continued efforts set the stage for Theta Nu Xi's presence in the Greek, non-Greek, and surrounding communities.

The University of North Carolina at Chapel Hill officially recognized Theta Nu Xi's Alpha chapter on April 11, 1997. To commemorate the result of their perseverance, the national founders–now known as the Founding Monarchs–acknowledged April 11, 1997, as the official founding date of the organization. With the collaborative efforts of the Founding Monarchs and the initiates of spring of 1998, the organization grew exponentially.

The earliest members of Theta Nu Xi addressed an immediate need to develop an official process of expansion that would support new entities as well as serving the interests of the sorority. Under the visionary guidance of Anna Lamadrid, new chapters were founded in the spring of 1999 at North Carolina State University and one at UNC Greensboro. The three groups of women designated themselves Alpha, Beta, and Gamma, respectively, and thus the national organization was born.

The sorority was incorporated on April 29, 1999. With the participation of the Alpha chapter, the Beta Kaleidoscope, and the Gamma Kaleidoscope, the national organization was established at the first annual National Convention on August 21, 1999. The first out-of-state expansion effort resulted in the founding of the Epsilon chapter at Utah State University in the spring of 2000.

In the first national constitution, the earliest members of Theta Nu Xi laid the foundation for an active post-graduate status. On July 19, 2000, sixteen women petitioned the national board to be granted status as an Alumnae chapter. The national board granted the Alumnae chapter status, allowing them to send representatives to the 2000 National Convention. Other alumnae chapters followed.

The sorority's national office is located in Norfolk, Virginia.

== Symbols ==
The motto of Theta Nu Xi is "Sisters of Diversity, Together as ONE". Its tenets or pillars are scholarship, service, sisterhood, leadership, and multiculturalism.

Theta Nu Xi's badge is a replica of its shield. The sorority's colors are black, lavender, and Carolina blue. Its symbol is the tiger swallowtail butterfly. Its flower is the sterling silver rose.

== Chapters ==
=== Undergraduate chapters ===
In the following list of Theta Nu Xi undergraduate chapters, active chapters are indicated in bold and the inactive chapters are in italics.

Chapter	Charter date and range	Institution	Location	Status	Ref.
Alpha	April 11, 1997	University of North Carolina at Chapel Hill	Chapel Hill, North Carolina	Inactive	
Beta	March 31, 1999	North Carolina State University	Raleigh, North Carolina	Inactive	
**Gamma**	April 21, 1999	University of North Carolina at Greensboro	Greensboro, North Carolina	Active	
Delta	April 14, 2000	Duke University	Durham, North Carolina	Inactive	
Epsilon	April 22, 2000	Utah State University	Logan, Utah	Inactive	
**Zeta**	December 10, 2000	Georgia State University	Atlanta, Georgia	Active	
Eta	August 29, 2001	Virginia Tech	Blacksburg, Virginia	Inactive	(Note: Started as a colony on February 25, 2001.)
Iota	February 24, 2001	University of Utah	Salt Lake City, Utah	Inactive	
Kappa	April 1, 2001	East Texas A&M University	Commerce, Texas	Inactive	(Note: Texas A&M University at Commerce changed its name to East Texas A&M University on 7 November 2024.)
Lambda	July 28, 2001	Florida State University	Tallahassee, Florida	Inactive	
Mu	December 2, 2001	University of Arizona	Tucson, Arizona	Inactive	
Nu	April 14, 2002	University of Pittsburgh	Pittsburgh, Pennsylvania	Inactive	
Omicron	December 4, 2002	University of Houston	Houston, Texas	Inactive	
Pi	December 7, 2002	University of Virginia	Charlottesville, Virginia	Inactive	
Rho	April 27, 2003	Muhlenberg College	Allentown, Pennsylvania	Inactive	(Note: Formed as the Rho Colony on April 27, 2003.)
Sigma	November 1, 2003	Syracuse University	Syracuse, New York	Inactive	
Tau	November 8, 2003	Arizona State University	Tempe, Arizona	Inactive	(Note: Began as Tau Colony on November 8, 2003.)
**Upsilon**	May 2, 2004	Indiana University Bloomington	Bloomington, Indiana	Active	
Phi	October 17, 2004	University of Texas at Austin	Austin, Texas	Inactive	
Chi	November 20, 2004	Columbia University	New York City, New York	Inactive	
Psi	May 2, 2005	University of New Mexico	Albuquerque, New Mexico	Inactive	(Note: Formed as the Precious Psi Colony on May 2, 2005.)
**Alpha Alpha**	June 4, 2005	University of Florida	Gainesville, Florida	Active	
Alpha Beta	July 8, 2005	Wayne State University	Detroit, Michigan	Inactive	
Alpha Gamma	December 3, 2005	College of New Jersey	Ewing Township, New Jersey	Inactive	
Alpha Delta	April 14, 2006	East Carolina University	Greenville, North Carolina	Inactive	
Alpha Epsilon	December 9, 2006	University of Michigan	Ann Arbor, Michigan	Inactive	
Alpha Zeta	November 8, 2008	University of Colorado Boulder	Boulder, Colorado	Inactive	
Alpha Eta	March 21, 2009	University of Texas at El Paso	El Paso, Texas	Inactive	
Alpha Theta	April 5, 2009	Ramapo College	Mahwah, New Jersey	Inactive	
Alpha Iota	April 10, 2010	State University of New York at Plattsburgh	Plattsburgh, New York	Inactive	
Alpha Kappa	May 2, 2010	Virginia Commonwealth University	Richmond, Virginia	Inactive	
**Alpha Lambda**	December 2, 2010	Worcester Polytechnic Institute	Worcester, Massachusetts	Active	
Alpha Mu	April 25, 2014	Florida Gulf Coast University	Fort Myers, Florida		
Alpha Nu	April 3, 2015	Emory University	Atlanta, Georgia	Inactive	
**Alpha Xi**	April 14, 2015	University of Denver	Denver, Colorado	Active	(Note: Colony was created from the local group V.I.B.E. (Vision Inspired By Empowerment) which was created in November 2013.)
Alpha Omicron	March 5, 2016	University of Kentucky	Lexington, Kentucky	Inactive	
Alpha Pi	April 21, 2017	Our Lady of the Lake University	San Antonio, Texas	Inactive	
**Alpha Rho**	April 28, 2017	University of Oklahoma	Norman, Oklahoma	Active	
Alpha Sigma	April 21, 2018	University of Georgia	Athens, Georgia	Inactive	
**Alpha Tau**	March 11, 2020	Oklahoma State University	Stillwater, Oklahoma	Active	
Alpha Upsilon	April 9, 2021	Florida International University	Miami, Florida	Inactive	
**Alpha Phi**	April 11, 2022	Miami University	Oxford, Ohio	Active	

=== Graduate, alumnae, and professional (GAP) chapters ===
These are the non-collegiate or GAP chapters of Theta Nu Xi, with active chapters indicated in bold and inactive chapters in italics.

Chapter	Charter date and range	Location	Status	Ref.
**Xi Alpha**	April 11, 2002	New York City Metro Area and New Jersey	Active	
**Xi Beta**	September 30, 2002	Greensboro, North Carolina	Active	
**Xi Gamma**	November 2, 2002	Mid-Atlantic (Washington D.C., Maryland, Virginia)	Active	(Note: Formed as the Washington, D.C. Mid-Atlantic GAP Colony in September 2000.)
Xi Delta	August 4, 2003	North-East Texas	Inactive	
**Xi Epsilon**	January 15, 2004	Atlanta Metro Area, Georgia	Active	
**Xi Zeta**	January 23, 2004	Southeast Florida (based in Miami, Florida)	Active	
Xi Eta	March 9, 2004	Arizona and Southern California	Inactive	
**Xi Theta**	April 16, 2004	Raleigh, Durham, and Chapel Hill, North Carolina	Active	
**Xi Iota**	August 25, 2004	Midwest (Illinois, Indiana, Iowa, Kentucky, Missouri, Michigan, Minnesota, Ohio, and Wisconsin)	Active	
Xi Kappa	December 9, 2005	Salt Lake City, Utah	Inactive	(Note: Formed on May 29, 2005, as the Northwest GAP Colony.)
Xi Lambda	August 21, 2006	Northeast Florida (based in Tallahassee, Florida)	Inactive	
Xi Mu	December 16, 2007	Central Florida (based in Orlando, Florida)	Inactive	
Xi Nu	January 26, 2009	Houston, Texas	Inactive	
Xi Xi	February 27, 2011	Mahwah, New Jersey	Inactive	
**Xi Omicron**	August 9, 2013	Richmond, Virginia	Active	(Note: Established as the Central Virginia GAP Colony on March 5, 2006.)
**Xi Pi**	April 1, 2014	Detroit, Michigan	Active	(Note: Founded as The Metro-Detroit GAP Colony on January 21, 2014.)
**Xi Rho**	July 6, 2014	Boulder, Colorado	Active	(Note: Organized as the Colorado State GAP Colony on November 18, 2013.)
Xi Sigma	October 8, 2014	Austin, Texas	Inactive	
Xi Tau	July 1, 2016	Tampa Bay Area, Florida	Inactive	(Note: Formed March 15, 2016, as the Tampa Bay GAP Colony.)
**Xi Upsilon**	July 18, 2014	Indianapolis, Indiana	Active	(Note: Established on July 18th, 2014 as the Indiana GAP Colony.)
**Xi Phi**	June 13, 2019	Charlotte, North Carolina	Active	(Note: Formed as the Charlotte Metro GAP Colony on October 12, 2018.)
Xi Chi	November 21, 2020	Northeast Florida (based in Jacksonville, Florida)	Inactive	
**Xi Psi**	April 8, 2010	Northern California, Oregon, and Washington	Active	
Tucson		Tucson, Arizona	Inactive	
Las Vegas	July 10, 2018	Las Vegas, Nevada	Inactive	
Rio Grande		Albuquerque, New Mexico	Active	
**Xi Omega**	July 7, 2022	Oklahoma	Active	
**Xi Alpha Alpha**	September 25, 2022	New England (based in Boston, Massachusetts)	Active	

== See also ==
- Cultural interest fraternities and sororities
- List of social sororities and women's fraternities
