= Mu Delta Alpha =

American Muslim-interest college sorority

- ΜΔΑ
- Coat of Arms of Mu Delta Alpha
- Founded: February 17, 2014; 12 years ago University of Texas at Dallas
- Type: Professional
- Affiliation: Independent
- Status: Active
- Emphasis: Muslim women
- Scope: National
- Motto: "Iman is our identity, Ihsan is our legacy"
- Pillars: Islam, Servicehood, Sisterhood, and Professionalism
- Colors: Teal and Peach
- Symbol: Butterfly
- Flower: Lily
- Jewel: Aquamarine
- Chapters: 8 active
- Headquarters: Allen, Texas; United States
- Website: www.mudeltaalpha.org

Mu Delta Alpha (ΜΔΑ) is an American professional sorority for Muslims. Established in 2014, it has chartered nine chapters in the United States. It was the first professional sorority for women in the United States.

== History ==
Mu Delta Alpha was founded as Muslimahs For Change Sorority on February 17, 2014 at the University of Texas at Dallas. It was founded by Samira Maddox who wanted a welcoming space for Black Muslims. Its other founding members were Fatima Ahmed, Dana Kamal, and Palwasha Rehmani. It is a "professional sorority that focuses on sisterhood, service, and personal development for young women". Although Muslim-focused, membership is open to women of all backgrounds. Its founders chose to create a professional sorority rather than a social sorority because there were many of the later and they wanted to a professional sorority to "give Muslim women the opportunity to show that Muslim women can reach their potential and that they are encouraged to educate themselves through Islam." It was the first professional sorority for women in the United States.

Muslimahs For Change Sorority became Mu Delta Alpha on June 11, 2016. It was incorporated in 2017 in the State of Texas. Initially, the sorority expanded within Texas. In 2017, Beta chapter was established at the University of Texas at Austin, followed by Gamma at the University of North Texas. This was followed by Delta at Wichita State University in 2019 and Epsilon at the University of Toledo in 2020. In 2021, Eta was established at New York University, followed by Theta at the University of Maryland, College Park. Kappa chapter was chartered at Ohio State University in 2023.

One of the sorority's annual event is the Young Muslimahs Summit. Its campus activities include hosting a fast-breaking meal, or iftar, for Ramadan. The Zeta chapter at the University of Colorado, Denver held established a prayer space on campus. Chapter also hosts Muslim speakers and programs related to women's empowerment. Because its members adhere to Islam, all of the sorority's events are alcohol-free.

The sorority held its first national convention in August 2023. It was a member of the National Multicultural Greek Council (NMGC). Its headquarters are located in Allen, Texas.

== Symbols ==
The Greek letter Mu Delta Alpha where selected to stand for "Muslimahs for Change". The motto of Mu Delta Alpha is "Iman is our identity, Ihsan is our legacy". Its pillars are Islam, Servicehood, Sisterhood, and Professionalism.

The sorority's colors are teal and peach, symbolizing vibrancy and warmth. Its flower is the lily, representing purity, renewal, and diversity. Its symbol is the butterfly. Its jewel is the aquamarine, representing "clarity of purpose and calm determination".

== Philanthropy ==
Mu Delta Alpha founded the Sakina Home for Girls, an orphanage for girls. In June 2023, the Sakina Homes became the sorority's independent Muslimahs for Change Foundation (M4C Foundation). At that time, the sorority adopted M4C Foundation as its national philanthropy. The foundation continues to support the Sakina Home and Education Center for Girls, as well as the LILY Program which provides STEM education, leadership training, and essential resources for girls.

== Chapters ==
Following are the chapters of Mu Delta Alpha.

Chapter	Charter date	Institution	Location	Status	Ref.
Alpha	February 17, 2014	University of Texas at Dallas	Richardson, Texas	Inactive	(Note: Chapter was called Muslimahs For Change Sorority from 2017 through June 11, 2016.)
Beta	February 17, 2017	University of Texas at Austin	Austin, Texas	Inactive	
Gamma	2017	University of North Texas	Denton, Texas	Inactive	
Delta	October 2019	Wichita State University	Wichita, Kansas	Active	
Epsilon	April 2020	University of Toledo	Toledo, Ohio	Inactive	
Zeta	202x ?	University of Colorado, Denver	Denver, Colorado	Inactive	
Eta	December 2021	New York University	New York City, New York	Active	
Theta	April 2022	University of Maryland, College Park	College Park, Maryland	Active	
Kappa	April 2023	Ohio State University	Columbus, Ohio	Active	

== See also ==
- Cultural interest fraternities and sororities
- Professional fraternities and sororities
- List of social sororities and women's fraternities
