= Mu Sigma Upsilon =

American multicultural collegiate sorority

- ΜΣΥ
- Founded: November 21, 1981; 44 years ago Rutgers University–New Brunswick
- Type: Social
- Affiliation: NMGC
- Status: Active
- Emphasis: Cultural Interest
- Scope: National
- Motto: Mujeres Siempre Unidas "Women Always United"
- Colors: Baby Blue and White
- Symbol: Amazon Woman
- Publication: The Amazonian
- Philanthropy: NAACP
- Chapters: 72
- Members: 1,578 active
- Nickname: MSU, MUs, Amazonas, Sophisticated Ladies
- Headquarters: P.O. Box 7728; North Bergen, New Jersey 07047; United States
- Website: www.msu1981.org

Mu Sigma Upsilon Sorority, Incorporated (ΜΣΥ) is an American multicultural intercollegiate sorority. It was founded in 1981 at Rutgers University–New Brunswick and is recognized as the first multicultural sorority in the nation. Mu Sigma Upsilon was a founding member of the National Multicultural Greek Council. It is the sister organization of Lambda Sigma Upsilon, a Latino-based fraternity.

== History ==
As the number of women from culturally diverse backgrounds pursuing higher education rose in the early 1980s, a need emerged for a dedicated support system. On November 21, 1981, five women—Eve Bracero, Lillian Sierra, Karinee Candelario, Ruth Gonzalez, and Sylvia Vigo—established Mu Sigma Upsilon at Rutgers University–New Brunswick as a social fellowship.

In the early 1980s, Mu Sigma Upsilon became the first sorority to be founded with a multicultural, rather than a specific ethnic or cultural, base. Mu Sigma Upsilon became a Greek-lettered organization in the early 1990s.

R.A.C.E is a national event of the sorority. Each chapter runs its version of the event, where campus cultural organizations are invited to perform in costume and provide cultural displays for table-top exhibitions during the event. Members are encouraged to wear national dress about their cultural background or heritage and provide sample delicacies from all parts of the world.

== Symbols ==
The sorority's motto is Mujeres Siempre Unidas or "Women Always United". Its colors are baby blue and white. Its mascot is the Amazon woman. Its nicknames are The Sophisticated Ladies or The MUs (pronounced mews). Its publication is The Amazonian.

== Philanthropy ==
Every five years, the organization selects a national philanthropy as beneficiary. Through this process, we are able to dedicate ourselves as a national organization to aiding a single charity organization for five years at a time, and continue to assist many more organizations in the future. Previous philanthropies include:

- Mavin Foundation
- Women In Need NYC
- Ovarian Cancer National Alliance
- Girls Inc
- Keep A Breast Foundation
- The Girl Effect
- To Write Love On Her Arms

Mu Sigma Upsilon's current philanthropy for 2021-2026 is: The National Association for the Advancement of Colored People (NAACP)

== Mu Sigma Upsilon Foundation ==
The Mu Sigma Upsilon Foundation Inc. is a 501(c)(3) charitable non-profit organization. The mission of the foundation is to provide essential support and financial resources for the educational, leadership, and charitable purposes of the sorority to enrich the lives of members and assist in improving the community in which they serve.

== T.I.A.R.A. Interest Group ==
T.I.A.R.A. is an acronym for Togetherness, Independence, Academics, Respect, and Achievement. As the official interest group for Mu Sigma Upsilon, the T.I.A.R.A. Group allows prospective members to engage with the organization’s operations prior to induction. Participants gain experience in event planning, programming, fundraising, and networking, while establishing relationships with both current sisters and other prospective members.

== Chapters ==
=== Undergraduate Chapters ===
Mu Sigma Upsilon does not name their chapters by the Greek alphabet, but rather chapters are given culturally significant names. Active chapters are indicated in bold. Inactive chapters are indicated in italics.

Chapter	Charter date and range	Institution	Location	Status	Ref.
Amazona	November 21, 1981	Rutgers University–New Brunswick	New Brunswick, New Jersey	Inactive	
**Siksika**	November 30, 1983	William Paterson University	Wayne, New Jersey	Active	
Conquistadoras	April 12, 1989	New Jersey Institute of Technology	Newark, New Jersey	Inactive	
**Matriarca**	November 29, 1990	Montclair State University	Montclair, New Jersey	Active	
**Aborigena**	April 17, 1991	Rutgers University-Newark	Newark, New Jersey	Active	
**Mosaic**	April 25, 1991	Kean University	Union Township, New Jersey	Active	
**Bellatrix**	1991			Memorial	
**Indigena**	December 1, 1994	New Jersey City University and Saint Peter's University	Jersey City, New Jersey	Active	
**Destinidas**	April 12, 1995	Bloomfield College	Bloomfield, New Jersey	Active	
**Zaona**	November 18, 1995	Stockton University	Pomona, New Jersey	Active	
**Jhansi**	November 10, 1996	Pennsylvania State University - Main	University Park, Pennsylvania	Active	
Godasiyo	November 10, 1996	Penn State Altoona	Altoona, Pennsylvania	Inactive	
**Palenque**	November 14, 1998	Bloomsburg University	Bloomsburg, Pennsylvania	Active	
Narra	November 19, 1998	New York University	New York City, New York	Inactive	
Emeritus	November 14, 1999	Ramapo College of New Jersey	Mahwah, New Jersey	Inactive	
**Concordia**	November 14, 1999	University of Connecticut	Storrs, Connecticut	Active	
Abrianeme	March 16, 2001	College of New Jersey	Ewing Township, New Jersey	Inactive	
Devi	March 9, 2002	University of Kansas	Lawrence, Kansas	Inactive	
Anansi	March 24, 2002	Cornell University	Ithaca, New York	Inactive	
Evadne	March 24, 2002	Le Moyne College	Syracuse, New York	Inactive	
**Haumea**	March 15, 2003	University of Central Florida	Orlando, Florida	Active	
**Xurima**	March 20, 2003	Seton Hall University	South Orange, New Jersey	Active	
**Genesis**	November 1, 2003	Kutztown University of Pennsylvania	Kutztown, Pennsylvania	Active	
Yazi	March 10, 2004	Florida Memorial College	Miami, Florida	Inactive	
**Orisha**	March 28, 2004	State University of New York at New Paltz	New Paltz, New York	Active	
Quinquatria	March 26, 2005	Stevens Institute of Technology	Hoboken, New Jersey	Inactive	
**Nysa**	March 26, 2005	SUNY Oneonta	Oneonta, New York	Active	
Vathara	May 1, 2005	Johnson & Wales University, Florida	Miami, Florida	Inactive	
**Lazuline**	November 12, 2005	Millersville University	Millersville, Pennsylvania	Active	
Celtic	November 20, 2005	Old Dominion University	Norfolk, Virginia	Inactive	
**Gaia**	April 1, 2006	Syracuse University	Syracuse, New York	Active	
**Kyathira**	April 1, 2006	University at Buffalo and Buffalo State University	Buffalo, New York	Active	
**Themiskyra**	April 6, 2006	SUNY Old Westbury	Old Westbury, New York	Active	
Cheveyo	2006	Lamar University	Beaumont, Texas	Inactive	
Hasinai	April 8, 2006	Stephen F. Austin University	Nacogdoches, Texas	Inactive	
**Zotikon**	April 13, 2006	Hunter College; St. Francis College	New York City, New York	Active	
**Dhyani**	April 15, 2007	University of North Carolina at Charlotte	Charlotte, North Carolina	Active	
Janus	April 6, 2008	Barry University	Miami, Florida	Inactive	
**Novastella**	April 13, 2008	West Chester University	West Chester, Pennsylvania	Active	
**Kailasa**	April 11, 2009	University of Georgia	Athens, Georgia	Active	
**Ionia**	April 11, 2009	East Stroudsburg University	East Stroudsburg, Pennsylvania	Active	
**Freyja**	April 19, 2009	Rowan University	Glassboro, New Jersey	Active	
Bodhati	December 5, 2009	Virginia Tech	Blacksburg, Virginia	Inactive	
Roma	April 17, 2010	George Washington University	Washington, D.C.	Inactive	
Rhea	April 18, 2010	Penn State Abington	Abington Township, Pennsylvania	Inactive	
Boetia	April 16, 2011	Georgia College & State University	Milledgeville, Georgia	Inactive	
Arikara	November 18, 2011	University of Nebraska at Kearney	Kearney, Nebraska	Inactive	
**Kumi**	April 1, 2012	SUNY Oswego	Oswego, New York	Active	
**Yemaya**	April 22, 2012	Lehigh University	Bethlehem, Pennsylvania	Active	
**Miakardia**	November 10, 2012	Bucknell University	Lewisburg, Pennsylvania	Active	
Kimimela	November 11, 2012	University of South Florida	Tampa, Florida	Inactive	
**Zarya**	April 6, 2013	University of Massachusetts Dartmouth	Dartmouth, Massachusetts	Active	
Sekhmet	November 2, 2013	Marshall University	Huntington, West Virginia	Inactive	
Akasa	November 23, 2013	Metropolitan State University of Denver	Denver, Colorado	Inactive	
Atitlán	2014	Indiana University of Pennsylvania	Indiana, Pennsylvania	Inactive	
**Samara**	November 16, 2014	Rutgers University–Camden	Camden, New Jersey	Active	
**Úthaulia**	April 1, 2017	Lycoming College	Williamsport, Pennsylvania	Active	
**Wujimu**	April 7, 2017	DePauw University	Greencastle, Indiana	Active	
**Dianaia**	March 31, 2018	University of Rochester	Rochester, New York	Active	
Maulana	November 10, 2018	SUNY Plattsburgh	Plattsburgh, New York	Inactive	
Artemisia	November 17, 2018	Felician University	Rutherford, New Jersey	Inactive	
Ọkụ	March 30, 2019	Fairleigh Dickinson University - Metropolitan Campus	Teaneck, New Jersey	Inactive	
Horaeziel	April 6, 2019	SUNY Cortland	Cortland, New York	Inactive	
**Arcus**	April 13, 2019	SUNY Albany	Albany, New York	Active	
Eden	November 16, 2019	Moravian College	Bethlehem, Pennsylvania	Inactive	
**Huitaca**	April 23, 2021	Lafayette College	Easton, Pennsylvania	Active	
**Saqqara**	April 1, 2023	Binghamton University	Binghamton, New York	Active	
**Dhoruba**	November 9, 2024	University of Delaware	Newark, Delaware	Active	
**Apaniiwa**	November 2025	Colorado State University	Fort Collins, Colorado	Active	

=== Graduate Chapter (Aretias) ===
Mu Sigma Upsilon's Aretias Graduate Chapter provides alumnae members with a system to become mentors and advisers to each other and to undergraduates. The chapter remains actively involved in academic programs at undergraduate chapters and surrounding communities with or without an undergraduate chapter. The Aretias Chapter also offers interested women the opportunity to join the sorority at the Graduate level. Women interested in joining MSU’s Aretias Chapter would have completed an undergraduate program with a minimum 3.0 grade point average, or be actively pursuing a degree of higher education.

Local Aretias Chapters:

- Aretias North New Jersey
- Aretias Pennsylvania
- Aretias New York
- Aretias New England
- Aretias Central Florida

== See also ==
- List of social sororities and women's fraternities
- Cultural interest fraternities and sororities
