= Lambda Tau Omega =

American collegiate multicultural sorority

- ΛΤΩ
- Founded: October 9, 1988; 37 years ago Montclair State University
- Type: Social
- Affiliation: NMGC
- Status: Active
- Emphasis: Multicultural
- Scope: National
- Motto: "Excellence through Unity, Knowledge, and Dedication"
- Colors: Royal Blue and Light Gray
- Mascot: Enchanting Mermaid
- Philanthropy: Welfare of Children
- Chapters: 12 (24 chartered)
- Colonies: 2
- Nickname: LTOs, Mermaids, and Merms
- Headquarters: P.O. Box 43324; Upper Montclair, New Jersey 07043; United States
- Website: www.lambdatauomega.org

Lambda Tau Omega Sorority, Inc. (ΛΤΩ) is a multicultural sorority founded in 1988 at Montclair State College (now Montclair State University), in Montclair, New Jersey. It is a founding member of the National Multicultural Greek Council (NMGC).

== History ==
Lambda Tau Omega Sorority was founded in 1988 by sixteen women who felt the need for a multicultural sorority at Montclair State College. Its purpose is to "uplift womyn of all social structures while striving towards excellence through their ideals and accomplishments" and dedication to noble service with a primary focus on the welfare of children.

In 1989, Beta and Gamma chapters were established at William Paterson University and New Jersey Institute of Technology, respectively. Other chapters followed in the 1990s across New Jersey. In 2000, the sorority chartered its first chapter outside of New Jersey, the Lambda chapter at the University of Illinois Urbana-Champaign.

Lambda Tau Omega is a founding member of the National Multicultural Greek Council (NMGC). Its headquarters is located in Upper Montclair, New Jersey.

== Symbols ==
The sorority's colors are royal blue and light grey. Its mascot is the Enchanting Mermaid. Its motto is "Excellence through Unity, Knowledge, and Dedication". Its members are called Mermaids, Merms, and LTOs.

== Activities ==
Lambda Tau Omega's main philanthropy is the welfare of children, including Pinwheels for Prevention (formerly called the Blue Ribbon Campaign), a child abuse awareness campaign each April. The sorority also raised funds to support Prevent Child Abuse America.

Lambda Tau Omega has a national performance or step team called Tidal Wave. It originally formed in 2001 as the National Stroll Team. The team participates in yard shows and step and stroll competitions.

== Chapters ==
Following is a list of Lambda Tau Omega undergraduate chapters. Active chapters are indicated in bold. Inactive chapters are indicated in italics.

Chapter	Charter date and range	Institution	Location	Status	Ref.
**Genesis Alpha**	October 9, 1988	Montclair State University	Montclair, New Jersey	Active	
Geminate Beta	1989	William Paterson University	Wayne, New Jersey	Inactive	
**Trilogy Gamma**	1989	New Jersey Institute of Technology	Newark, New Jersey	Active	
**Delta Quanyx**	1990	Kean University	Union Township, New Jersey	Active	
Quint Epsilon	1990	Saint Peter's University	Jersey City, New Jersey	Inactive	
Ever Zeta	1993	Ramapo College	Mahwah, New Jersey	Inactive	
Heptakin Eta	1993	Seton Hall University	South Orange, New Jersey	Inactive	
**Leonyne Theta**	1994	Rutgers University		Active	
Feline Iota	1996	New Jersey City University	Jersey City, New Jersey	Inactive	
Krystallyne Kappa	1998	The College of New Jersey	Ewing Township, New Jersey	Inactive	
Leviathan Lambda	2000	University of Illinois Urbana-Champaign		Inactive	
Prysmatic Mu	2003	Florida State University	Tallahassee, Florida	Inactive	
Nexthys Nu	2004	Rider University	Lawrence Township, New Jersey	Inactive	
Xpedieenth Xi	2005	Fairleigh Dickinson University	Madison, New Jersey	Inactive	
Vydurance Omicron	2005	State University of New York at New Paltz	New Paltz, New York	Inactive	
Phonoxy Pi	2008	Francis Marion University	Florence, South Carolina	Inactive	
Nezwaly Rho	2008	Temple University	Philadelphia, Pennsylvania	Inactive	
Ariamas Sigma	2008	Stockton University	Galloway Township, New Jersey	Inactive	
Tau Establishment			Philadelphia, Pennsylvania	Inactive	
Vierenti Upsilon	2013	American International College	Springfield, Massachusetts	Inactive	
Trinphoenite Phi	2012	Rutgers University–Newark	Newark, New Jersey	Inactive	
**Travinsus Chi**	2012	Rutgers University–Camden	Camden, New Jersey	Active	
**Nyris Psi**	2012	Rowan University	Glassboro, New Jersey	Active	
Omega				Unassigned	
**Novalescent Alpha Alpha**	2012	Bloomfield College	Bloomfield, New Jersey	Active	
**Kyanite Alpha Beta**	2019	Caldwell University	Caldwell, New Jersey	Active	
**Arizenthean Alpha Gamma**	2025	Stevens Institute of Technology	Hoboken, New Jersey	Active	
Trinity Establishment		Trinity College	Hartford, Connecticut	Colony	

Lambda Tau Omega, Sorority Inc. Professional Chapters
Chapter	Regions	Status
**Alpha Alpha Lambda**	Bergan and Passaic Counties, NJ	Active
Alpha Beta Lambda	Sussex, Morris, Warren, and Hunterdon Counties, NJ	Inactive
**Alpha Gamma Lambda**	Somerset, Middlesex, Mercer, Burlington, Monmouth, and Ocean Counties, NJ	Active
**Alpha Delta Lambda**	Bronx, Brooklyn, Manhattan, Queens, Staten Island, & NY State, NY	Active
**Alpha Epsilon Lambda**	Camden, Atlantic, Gloucester, Salem, Cumberland, and Cape May Counties, NJ	Active
Alpha Zeta Lambda	NC, SC, GA, North FL States	Inactive
**Alpha Eta Lambda**	Hudson, Union, Essex Counties, NJ	Active
**Illinois**	All Counties, IL	Active
South Florida	Charlotte, Glades, Martin, Lee Hendry, Palm Beach, Collier, Broward, Monroe, Miami-Dade Counties, FL	Inactive
**The Carolinas**	Jacksonville, NC	Active

== See also ==
- List of social sororities and women's fraternities
- National Multicultural Greek Council
- Cultural interest fraternities and sororities
