= Delta Xi Nu =

American multicultural college sorority

- ΔΞΝ
- Founded: October 7, 1997; 28 years ago Texas A&M University
- Type: Social
- Affiliation: NMGC
- Status: Active
- Emphasis: Multicultural and Service
- Scope: National
- Motto: Sisterhood, Culture, and Education
- Slogan: "Changing Old Ways to New"
- Colors: Red and Silver
- Flower: Red tulip
- Mascot: Butterfly
- Philanthropy: Awareness of Violence Against Women
- Chapters: 21
- Colonies: 4
- Nickname: Xi Honeys and Honeys
- Logo
- Headquarters: College State, Texas; United States
- Website: www.deltaxinu.org

Delta Xi Nu Multicultural Sorority, Inc. (ΔΞΝ) is an American multicultural-based sorority that was established at Texas A&M University in College Station, Texas.

== History ==
Delta Xi Nu was established on October 7, 1997, at Texas A&M University in College Station, Texas as a multicultural sorority. Its five founders were Jetje Brewton, Rena Kharbat, Adrienne Magirl, Lesliam Quiros, and Jaime Slaughter.

In 2003, the sorority became national with the founding of Beta chapter at Tulane University. That was followed by Gamma at Colorado State University and Delta at the University of Texas Rio Grand Valley in 2006. The sorority's membership consists of women from various cultural backgrounds, ethnicities, races, and sexual identities.

The sorority joined the National Multicultural Greek Council (NMGC) in the fall of 2016. As of 2025, Delta Xi Nu has chartered seventeen chapters, along with founding four associate chapters or colonies. Its national headquarters is in College Station, Texas.

== Symbols ==
The Greek letters ΔΞΝ were chosen to mean "Changing Old Ways to New". Delta Xi Nu's motto is "Sisterhood, Culture, and Education."

The sorority's colors are red and silver. Its mascot is the butterfly. Its flower is a red tulip. Its nickname is Xi Honeys and the Honeys.

== Activities ==
Delta Xi Nu's activities includes social, educational, and cultural events, along with service activities and fundraising. The sorority hosts an Annual Unity Dinner which supports diversity on campus. It also holds special events on campus for Hispanic Heritage Month.

== Philanthropy ==
Delta Xi Nu's national philanthropy is Awareness of Violence Against Women. The individual chapters also have local charities that they support through events, fundraising and awareness.

== Chapters ==
=== Collegiate ===
Following is a list of Delta Xi Nu collegiate chapters and associate chapters (colonies), with active chapters noted in bold and inactive chapters in italics.

Chapter	Charter date and range	Institution	Location	Status	Ref.
Alpha	October 7, 1997	Texas A&M University	College Station, Texas	Active	
Beta	2003	Tulane University	New Orleans, Louisiana	Inactive	
**Gamma**	2006	Colorado State University	Fort Collins, Colorado	Active	
Delta	2006	University of Texas Rio Grande Valley	Edinburg, Texas	Inactive	
**Epsilon**	April 19, 2008	Sam Houston State University	Huntsville, Texas	Active	
Zeta	2009	University of Texas at Arlington	Arlington, Texas	Inactive	
**Eta**	2011	University of the Incarnate Word	San Antonio, Texas	Active	
**Theta**	April 26, 2012	Our Lady of the Lake University	San Antonio, Texas	Active	
**Iota**	2012	University of Texas at San Antonio	San Antonio, Texas	Active	
**Kappa**	2017	University of Houston–Clear Lake	Pasadena and Houston, Texas	Active	
Lambda	2016–20xx ?	Texas State University	San Marcos, Texas	Inactive	
Mu	October 27, 2016 – 2022	University of Missouri	Columbia, Missouri	Inactive	
**Nu**	April 5, 2014	Texas A&M International University	Laredo, Texas	Active	
**Xi**	2017	Lamar University	Beaumont, Texas	Active	
Omicron Associate		Western Michigan University	Kalamazoo, Michigan	Inactive	(Note: Colony was established in 2015 and was never chartered.)
Pi Associate		Central Methodist University	Fayette, Missouri	Inactive	(Note: Colony was established in 2016 and was never chartered.)
**Rho**	April 7, 2018	University of Nebraska–Lincoln	Lincoln, Nebraska	Active	
**Sigma**	2024	Centenary University	Hackettstown, New Jersey	Active	
**Tau Associate**		Colorado College	Colorado Springs, Colorado	Active	(Note: Colony was established on January 23, 2020.)
**Upsilon Associate**		University of Texas at Austin	Austin, Texas	Active	(Note: Colony was established in 2021.)
**Phi**	2021	Auraria Campus	Denver, Colorado	Active	
**Omega**				Memorial	

=== Graduate ===
Following are the graduate chapters of Delta Xi Nu, with active chapters indicated in bold and inactive chapters in italics.

Chapter	Charter date and range	Location	Status	Ref.
**Houston Alumnae Chapter**	September 26, 2015	Houston, Texas	Active	
**Dallas/Fort Worth Alumnae Chapter**	September 25, 2015	Dallas and Fort Worth, Texas	Active	
**New Orleans Alumnae Chapter**	December 11, 2015	New Orleans, Louisiana	Active	

== See also ==
- Cultural interest fraternities and sororities
- List of social sororities and women's fraternities
