= National Pan-Hellenic Council =

African American fraternity & sorority organization

- NPHC
- Founded: May 10, 1930; 96 years ago Howard University
- Type: Umbrella
- Affiliation: Independent
- Status: Active
- Emphasis: African American fraternities and sororities
- Scope: National
- Members: Nine fraternities and sororities active
- Headquarters: Philadelphia, Pennsylvania 19128; United States
- Website: www.nphchq.com

The National Pan-Hellenic Council (NPHC) is a collaborative umbrella council composed of historically African American fraternities and sororities, commonly called the Divine Nine, and also referred to as Black Greek Letter Organizations (BGLOs). The NPHC was formed as a permanent organization on May 10, 1930, on the campus of Howard University, in Washington, D.C., with Matthew W. Bullock as the active Chairman and B. Beatrix Scott as Vice-Chairman. NPHC was incorporated under the laws of the State of Illinois in 1937.

The council promotes interaction through forums, meetings, and other media to exchange information and engages in cooperative programming and initiatives through various activities and functions.

Each constituent member organization determines its own strategic direction and program agenda. Today, member organizations' primary purpose and focus remains camaraderie and academic excellence for its members and service to the communities they serve. Each promotes community awareness and action through educational, economic, and cultural service activities.

== History ==
The National Pan-Hellenic Council was established during the Jim Crow era when Greek letter collegiate organizations founded by white Americans did not want to be affiliated with Greek letter collegiate organizations founded by African Americans.

The organization's stated purpose and mission in 1930:

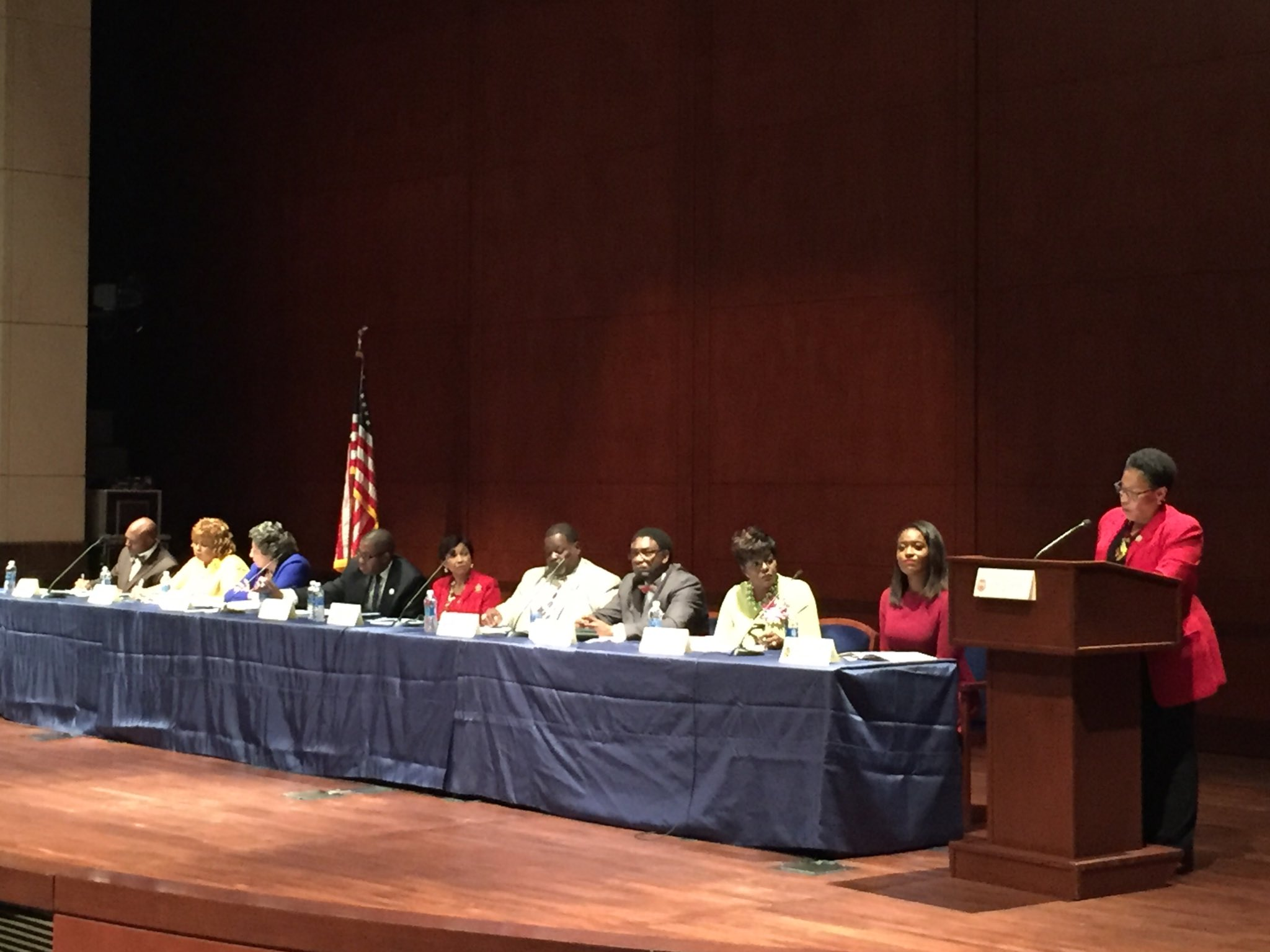
Marcia Fudge speaking at the 2017 National Pan-Hellenic Council Forum.

Unanimity of thought and action as far as possible in the conduct of Greek letter collegiate fraternities and sororities, and to consider problems of mutual interest to its member organizations.

The founding members of the NPHC were Alpha Kappa Alpha, Kappa Alpha Psi, Omega Psi Phi, Delta Sigma Theta, and Zeta Phi Beta. The council's membership expanded as Alpha Phi Alpha (1931), Phi Beta Sigma (1931), Sigma Gamma Rho (1937), and Iota Phi Theta (1996) later joined. In his book on BGLOs, The Divine Nine: The History of African-American Fraternities and Sororities in America (2001), Lawrence Ross coined the phrase "The Divine Nine" when referring to the coalition. As required by various campus recognition policies, neither the NPHC nor its member national or chapter organizations discriminate based on race or religion.

In 1992, the first permanent national office for NPHC was established in Bloomington, Indiana on the campus of Indiana University through the cooperation of Indiana University and the National Board of Directors of NPHC. Before its establishment, for over 62 years, the national office would sojourn from one officer to the next.

== Affiliate organizations ==
The members of the National Pan-Hellenic Council are shown below in order of founding:

Name	Greek letters	Type	Founding date	Founding university	Headquarters	Chapters	Total initiates	Joined	Notes
Alpha Phi Alpha	ΑΦΑ	Fraternity	December 4, 1906	Cornell University	Baltimore, Maryland	706	200,000	1931	First intercollegiate African American fraternity. Only NPHC organization to be founded at an Ivy League university.
Alpha Kappa Alpha	ΑΚΑ	Sorority	January 15, 1908	Howard University	Chicago, Illinois	1,074	360,000	1930	First intercollegiate African American sorority. First NPHC sorority to be nationally incorporated.
Kappa Alpha Psi	ΚΑΨ	Fraternity	January 5, 1911	Indiana University Bloomington	Philadelphia, Pennsylvania	649 (active undergraduate & alumni chapters)	250,000+	1930	Founded as Kappa Alpha Nu. First NPHC organization to be nationally incorporated.
Omega Psi Phi	ΩΨΦ	Fraternity	November 17, 1911	Howard University	Decatur, Georgia	750		1930	First fraternity to be founded at a historically black university.
Delta Sigma Theta	ΔΣΘ	Sorority	January 13, 1913	Howard University	Washington, D.C.	1,060	350,000	1930	
Phi Beta Sigma	ΦΒΣ	Fraternity	January 9, 1914	Howard University	Washington, D.C.	599 (active chapters)	225,000	1931	Constitutionally bound with Zeta Phi Beta.
Zeta Phi Beta	ΖΦΒ	Sorority	January 16, 1920	Howard University	Washington, D.C.	875+	125,000	1930	Constitutionally bound with Phi Beta Sigma.
Sigma Gamma Rho	ΣΓΡ	Sorority	November 12, 1922	Butler University	Cary, North Carolina	500	85,000+	1937	Only NPHC sorority founded at a predominately white institution.
Iota Phi Theta	ΙΦΘ	Fraternity	September 19, 1963	Morgan State University	Baltimore, Maryland	300+	75,000	1996	Only NPHC organization founded in the second half of the 20th century.

== Traditional Greek housing ==
Traditional Greek housing amongst NPHC organizations is rare. Unlike most National Panhellenic Conference (NPC) and North American Interfraternity Conference (NIC) organizations that have many traditional Greek houses primarily for undergraduate members on or near their college campuses, NPHC organizations have only a few. Most existing NPHC organization houses are untraditional and unaffiliated with a college. In recent years, a growing number of undergraduate chapters of NPHC organizations have advocated for convenient traditional Greek housing for recruitment, meetings, stroll/step practices, socializing, and storing chapter paraphernalia, but the lack of proper funding and coordination amongst members continues to be a major issue. In substitution, some undergraduate chapters have settled for small outdoor Greek plots to help substantiate their presence on campus.

== See also ==
- College fraternities and sororities
- Concilio Interfraternitario Puertorriqueño de la Florida
- Cultural interest fraternities and sororities
- Fraternity and Sorority Political Action Committee
- List of African-American fraternities
- List of social fraternities and sororities
- National Association of Latino Fraternal Organizations
- National Multicultural Greek Council
