= Omega Phi Chi =

American multicultural collegiate sorority

- ΩΦΧ
- Founded: November 9, 1988; 37 years ago Rutgers University
- Type: Social
- Affiliation: NMGC
- Status: Active
- Emphasis: Multicultural
- Scope: National
- Motto: "Destroying All Boundaries. Uniting All Races. Omega Phi Chi. We Dare To Be Different. "Preserving the Past. Cultivating the Present. Building the Future. Omega Phi Chi. We Dare to Be Different."
- Slogan: "Diversity at its Finest"
- Colors: Perfect Pink and Onyx Black
- Symbol: Heart
- Flower: Pink Lady's Slipper
- Jewel: Black Onyx
- Mascot: Black panther
- Chapters: 26
- Headquarters: 576 Valley Road, #261; Wayne, New Jersey 07470; United States
- Website: www.omegaphichi.org

Omega Phi Chi Multicultural Sorority, Inc. (ΩΦΧ) is an American multicultural sorority that was established on November 9, 1988 at Rutgers University–New Brunswick.

== History ==
Omega Phi Chi was established on November 9, 1988, at Rutgers University–New Brunswick by eight women of Asian, African American, and Latina descent. The sorority's founders felt the need to establish a multicultural organization that spoke to their needs across diverse backgrounds, distinct cultural roots, and the empowerment of the female culture. They came together to found a multicultural sorority; a different type of organization that would not be categorized by ethnicity, creed, or culture.

The founding mothers of Omega Phi Chi Multicultural Sorority Inc. are:

- Magdaly Casillas – Puerto Rican
- Cindy Cumba – Puerto Rican and Mexican
- Annette Cuevas – Puerto Rican
- Tracie Davis – African American
- Dawn Gonzalez – Puerto Rican
- Stacy Richardson – African American
- Bernadette Santana – Filipina and Dominican
- Socorro Valle – Puerto Rican

The purpose of Omega Phi Chi is to create a unity among all women and promote ethnic diversity by integrating women of all boundaries and cultures. The main objectives of this organization are academic excellence and involvement in community affairs. In addition, Omega Phi Chi members pride themselves in promoting professionalism.

Since its inception, the sorority has grown to include over 95 different nationalities and has started 24 chapters in New Jersey, New York, Florida, Arizona, Texas, Indiana, and California. Its headquarters is located in Wayne, New Jersey.

== Symbols ==
The core value of Omega Phi Chi is "Academic Excellence and Involvement in Community Affairs". The sorority's mottos are "Destroying All Boundaries. Uniting All Races. Omega Phi Chi. We Dare to Be Different" and "Preserving the Past, Cultivating the Present, Building the Future, Omega Phi Chi, We Dare To Be Different"

The sorority's colors are perfect pink and onyx black. Its mascot is the black panther, and stone is the black onyx. Its flower is the pink lady's slipper, also known as moccasin.

== Chapters ==
Following is a list of Omega Phi Chi chapters. Active chapters are indicated in bold. Inactive chapters are indicated in italics.

Chapter	Charter date and range	Institution	Location	Status	Ref.
**Alpha**	November 9, 1988	Rutgers University - New Brunswick	New Brunswick and Piscataway, New Jersey	Active	
Beta	November 8, 1992 – 20xx ?	Rider University	Lawrence Township, New Jersey.	Inactive	
**Gamma**	November 8, 1992	New Jersey City University	Jersey City, New Jersey	Active	
**Delta**	April 12, 1994		South Orange, New Jersey	Active	
**Epsilon**	April 12, 1994	William Paterson University	Wayne, New Jersey	Active	
Zeta	November 14, 1997 – 20xx ?	The College of New Jersey	Ewing Township, New Jersey	Inactive	
Eta	November 11, 1999 – 20xx ?	Ramapo College	Mahwah, New Jersey	Inactive	
**Theta**	November 30, 2000	Kean University		Active	
Iota	December 2, 2002 – 20xx ?	State University of New York at New Paltz	New Paltz, New York	Inactive	
Kappa	February 27, 2004 – 20xx ?	Barry University	Miami Shores, Florida	Inactive	
Lambda	July 23, 2005 – 20xx ?	Arizona State University	Tempe, Arizona	Inactive	
**Mu**	March 26, 2010	Montclair State University	Montclair, New Jersey	Active	
**Nu**	November 29, 2009	Rutgers University–Newark	Newark, New Jersey	Active	
Xi	March 26, 2010 – 20xx ?	Florida International University	Miami, Florida	Inactive	
**Omicron**	April 8, 2010	Fairleigh Dickinson University	Teaneck, New Jersey	Active	
Pi	August 24, 2012 – 20xx ?	Sam Houston State University	Huntsville, Texas	Inactive	
Rho	August 24, 2012 – 20xx ?	California State University, Dominguez Hills	Carson, California	Inactive	
Sigma	January 17, 2014 – 20xx ?	Buffalo State University	Buffalo, New York	Inactive	
Tau	April 24, 2014 – 20xx ?	Hofstra University	Hempstead, New York	Inactive	
Upsilon	August 22, 2015 – 20xx ?	Purdue University	West Lafayette, Indiana	Inactive	
**Phi**	January 8, 2016	Felician University		Active	
**Chi**	May 10, 2016	New Jersey Institute of Technology	Newark, New Jersey	Active	
**Psi**	November 20, 2016	Fairleigh Dickinson University	Madison, New Jersey	Active	
**Omega**				Memorial	
Alpha Alpha	November 22, 2016 – 20xx ?	Rutgers University–Camden	Camden, New Jersey	Inactive	
Alpha Beta	August 10, 2018 – 202x ?	Washington State University	Pullman, Washington	Inactive	(Note: Chapter was formed as a colony in 2015.)
Alpha Gamma	September 3, 2018 – 202x ?	Eastern Washington University	Cheney, Washington	Inactive	

== See also ==
- List of social sororities and women's fraternities
- Cultural interest fraternities and sororities
