= National Multicultural Greek Council =

Organization of multicultural fraternities and sororities

- NMGC
- Founded: 1998; 28 years ago United States
- Type: Umbrella
- Affiliation: Independent
- Status: Active
- Emphasis: Multicultural fraternities and sororities
- Scope: National
- Members: 13 organizations active
- Headquarters: P.O. Box 25632; Newark, New Jersey 07101; United States
- Website: www.nationalmgc.org

The National Multicultural Greek Council (NMGC) is an umbrella council for multicultural fraternities and sororities in the United States and was established in 1998.

== History ==
Multicultural college fraternities and sororities, which represent a range of cultural identities, emerged in the United States during the 1980s and 1990s. Inspired by the creation of the National Association of Latino Fraternal Organizations in 1998, thirteen multicultural organizations met in October 1998 to form a similar organization. The outcome of the meeting was the establishment of the Multicultural Pan-Hellenic Alliance (MCPA) in 1998, now known as the National Multicultural Greek Council (NMGC). NMGC was established to serve as an umbrella organization representing culturally based fraternities and sororities.

The National Multicultural Greek Council formally adopted a Code of Ethics for its members in 2005. This was followed by the establishment of the NMGC Principles of Excellence, which require member organizations to be incorporated, maintain an anti-hazing policy, provide service and scholarship or academic initiatives, and carry at least one million dollars in liability insurance.

The National Multicultural Greek Council aims "to promote multiculturalism by advocating for justice and equity, cultivating interfraternal relationships, and empowering its member organizations."

== Activities ==
The National Multicultural Greek Council awards scholarships to both undergraduate and graduate members of its member organizations. NMGC presents the Chapter Advisor of the Year Award to an outstanding fraternity or sorority chapter advisor from a member organization. Additional annual awards include the Cultural Awareness Award, Excellence in Community Service Award, Flores/Pipersburg Founders Award, Professional of the Year Award, and the Unity Award.

== Governance ==
NMGC is governed by a National Executive Board that is elected every two years. The Board consists of a President, Vice President, Treasurer, Secretary, Public Relations Coordinator, and University Liaison. NMGC's national headquarters is located in Newark, New Jersey.

== Affiliate organizations ==
To become a member of the National Multicultural Greek Council, a fraternity or sorority must be multicultural or multiethnic and have been in existence for at least five years, with a minimum of five chapters or colonies/associate chapters. In addition, prospective member organizations must be incorporated in the United States and maintain at least $1,000,000 in liability insurance coverage.

=== Current members ===
The following are the current members of the National Multicultural Greek Council in alphabetical order. Chapter counts include undergraduate chapters and colonies.

Organization	Symbols	Founding date	Founding institution	Chapters	Year joined NMGC	Ref.
Delta Xi Nu Multicultural Sorority	ΔΞΝ	October 7, 1997	Texas A&M University	21	2016	
Delta Xi Phi Multicultural Sorority	ΔΞΦ	April 20, 1994	University of Illinois at Urbana–Champaign	23	1998	(Note: Founding member of NMGC.)
Gamma Beta Chi Fraternity	ΓΒΧ	November 15, 2002	Broward County, Florida	9	2022	
Gamma Eta Sorority	ΓΗ	October 18, 1995	University of Florida	8	2006	
Lambda Sigma Gamma Sorority	ΛΣΓ	October 24, 1986	California State University, Sacramento	26	2012	
Lambda Tau Omega Sorority	ΛΤΩ	October 9, 1988	Montclair State University	24	1998	
MALIK Fraternity	MALIK	May 13, 1977	LIU Post	16	2023	(Note: Non-Greek Fraternity, formerly known as MΣΨ) (Note: Organizes Kingdoms (Chapters) using the Arabic alphabet as opposed to the Greek letters)
Mu Delta Alpha Sorority	ΜΔΑ	February 17, 2014	University of Texas at Dallas	9	2024	
Mu Sigma Upsilon Sorority	ΜΣΥ	November 21, 1981	Rutgers University–New Brunswick	71	1998	
Omega Phi Chi Multicultural Sorority	ΩΦΧ	November 9, 1988	Rutgers University	24	1998	
Phi Sigma Chi Multicultural Fraternity	ΦΣΧ	November 16, 1996	New York City College of Technology	14	1998	
Psi Sigma Phi Multicultural Fraternity	ΨΣΦ	December 12, 1990	Montclair State University and New Jersey City University	17	1998	(Note: Not to be confused with the NIC general fraternity with a similar looking name, Phi Sigma Phi.)
Theta Nu Xi Multicultural Sorority	ΘΝΞ	April 11, 1997	University of North Carolina at Chapel Hill	67	2011	(Note: Not to be confused with the sophomore class society, now largely disbanded, with a similar looking name, Theta Nu Epsilon.)

=== Former members ===
The following are former members of the National Multicultural Greek Council.

Organization	Symbols	Founding institutions	Founding date	Year joined NMGC and range	Ref.
Delphic Fraternity	ΓΣΤ	State University of New York at Geneseo	October 13, 1871	1998 to c. 2010	(Note: Founding member of NMGC.)
Lambda Psi Delta Sorority	ΛΨΔ	Yale University	March 9, 1997	Active as of 2009	

== See also ==
- List of social fraternities and sororities
- Racism in Greek life
