= List of University of Southern Mississippi fraternities and sororities =

The University of Southern Mississippi, informally known as "Southern Miss", is home to more than thirty national fraternity and sorority chapters. These chapters are under the authority of various groups. The North American Interfraternity Conference and National Panhellenic Conference members are under the authority of Greek Life. Non-affiliated fraternities and sororities such as Beta Upsilon Chi and Sigma Alpha Iota fall under the Department of Student Activities. In the fall of 2023, nine percent of the university's male students belonged to a fraternity and ten percent of the female students belonged to a sorority.

Following is a list of University of Southern Mississippi fraternities and sororities, organized by type and national umbrella organizations.

== Social fraternities and sororities ==
=== National Pan-Hellenic Council ===
The following organizations at Southern Miss are members of the National Pan-Hellenic Council.

- Alpha Kappa Alpha
- Alpha Phi Alpha
- Delta Sigma Theta
- Iota Phi Theta
- Kappa Alpha Psi
- Omega Psi Phi (inactive)
- Phi Beta Sigma
- Sigma Gamma Rho
- Zeta Phi Beta

=== National Panhellenic Conference ===
The following Southern Miss sororities are members of the National Panhellenic Conference.

- Alpha Chi Omega
- Alpha Delta Pi
- Alpha Sigma Alpha (inactive)
- Chi Omega
- Delta Delta Delta
- Delta Gamma
- Delta Zeta (inactive)
- Delta Sigma Epsilon (inactive)
- Kappa Alpha Theta (inactive)
- Kappa Delta
- Pi Beta Phi
- Phi Mu
- Sigma Sigma Sigma (inactive)

=== North American Interfraternity Conference ===
The following Southern Miss fraternities are members of the North American Interfraternity Conference.

- Acacia (inactive)
- Alpha Tau Omega
- Delta Tau Delta
- Kappa Alpha Order (inactive)
- Kappa Sigma
- Pi Kappa Alpha
- Pi Kappa Phi
- Phi Kappa Tau
- Sigma Alpha Epsilon
- Sigma Chi
- Sigma Nu
- Sigma Phi Epsilon
- Tau Kappa Epsilon (inactive)

== Other fraternal organizations ==
These are other Greek letter organizations at Southern Miss.

- Alpha Phi Omega, service fraternity
- Beta Upsilon Chi, Christian fraternity (inactive)
- Chi Alpha, Christian fellowship
- Delta Sigma Pi, professional business fraternity
- Mu Phi Epsilon, professional music fraternity
- Phi Mu Alpha Sinfonia, social music fraternity
- Sigma Alpha Iota, professional music sorority

== Honor and recognition societies ==
- Alpha Epsilon Delta, health preprofessional honor society
- Alpha Psi Omega, theater recognition society
- Beta Alpha Psi, accounting honor society
- Beta Beta Beta, honor society for biological science
- Beta Gamma Sigma, business honor society
- Kappa Kappa Psi, leadership honor society for band
- Lambda Sigma, academic honor society
- National Residence Hall Honorary, campus leadership honorary
- National Society of Collegiate Scholars, academic honor society
- Order of Omega, honor society for sorority and fraternity members
- Phi Alpha Theta, history honor society
- Phi Kappa Phi, academic honor society
- Psi Chi, psychology honor society
- Sigma Tau Delta, English honor society
