= List of Alpha Sigma Alpha chapters =

Alpha Sigma Alpha is a college sorority founded on November 15, 1901, at the Virginia State Female Normal School (later known as Longwood College and now known as Longwood University) in Farmville, Virginia. By 1912, all but four of the chapters of Alpha Sigma Alpha had closed; most of its early chapters were placed at short-lived women's seminaries and the junior colleges. By the following year only the Alpha chapter remained. Rising to meet what was an existential challenge Alpha Sigma Alpha reorganized itself at a crucial fall 1914 convention to target growth into colleges with bona fide teachers programs, adding the practical aim of expansion by absorption of what was a series of local sororities. This strategy was successful.

Over several decades, teachers' colleges began to offer an expanded array of four-year degrees, while four-year schools were adding teacher programs. The AES was dissolved in 1947. (Note: Many of the AES' former members joined the NPC. For some this would require further adjustment of their chapter maps: NPC members were prohibited from placing chapters at non-accredited schools.) By 1951 Alpha Sigma Alpha had once again shifted its focus, abandoning a self-imposed limit to serve only teachers colleges by opting to join the NPC as a full member and general sorority, and potentially serve all accredited colleges and universities.

Following is a list of Alpha Sigma Alpha sorority chapters, with active chapters indicated in bold and inactive chapters and institutions indicated in italics.

Chapter	Charter date and range	Institution	Location	Status	Ref.
**Alpha**	November 15, 1901 – 1919; 1933	Longwood University	Farmville, Virginia	Active	(Note: This chapter was revived by the absorption of the local sorority Delta Sigma Chi, itself dating to 1919.)
Beta	November 30, 1903 – 1904	Greenbrier College	Lewisburg, West Virginia	Inactive	
Gamma	May 9, 1904 – 1909	Chicora College for Women	Columbia, South Carolina	Inactive	
Delta	February 1905 – 1907	Mary Baldwin College	Staunton, Virginia	Inactive	(Note: The Greek system died out at Mary Baldwin in approximately 1910.)
Epsilon	March 1, 1905 – 1907	Fauquier Institute	Warrenton, Virginia	Inactive	
Zeta	October 27, 1905 – 1906	Fairmont Seminary	Washington, D.C.	Inactive	
Eta	December 15, 1905 – 1909	Ward's Seminary	Warrenton, Virginia	Inactive	
Iota	May 1908 – 1913	Randolph College	Lynchburg, Virginia	Withdrew (ΠΒΦ)	(Note: Iota chapter fell to pressure from the college during an anti-fraternity wave when its chapter was closed. However, members persisted, and petitioned Pi Beta Phi for a charter, which was granted, making them the Virginia Alpha chapter of ΠΒΦ.) (Note: The last of Randolph College's Greek letter organization died in 1960)
Gamma Beta Sigma	May 27, 1909 – 1910	St. Mary's College	Raleigh, North Carolina	Inactive	(Note: Chapter formed from the last remaining chapter of Gamma Beta Sigma sorority, established in 1901. Saint Mary's was a junior college and high school until 1998, when the college division closed.)
Kappa Phi	June 5, 1909 – 1914; 2001–2004	Mount Union College	Alliance, Ohio	Inactive	(Note: Chapter was formed from Kappa Phi local sorority, established in 1882.)
Sigma Phi Epsilon	February 28, 1909 – 1914	Brenau College	Gainesville, Georgia	Inactive	(Note: Chapter formed from Sigma Phi Epsilon local sorority, established in 1905. It had no relation to the men's fraternity of the same name. The Brenau group joined Alpha Sigma Alpha on February 28, 1909, retaining the name Sigma Phi Epsilon chapter but was released in 1913 due to rules that limited ΑΣΑ to place chapters only at teachers colleges. In 1914 the former Sigma Phi Epsilon chapter petitioned and was granted a charter by ΔΔΔ.)
Nu	November 24, 1910 – 1912	Shorter University	Rome, Georgia	Inactive	
Chi Iota	December 1911–1912	Hamilton School	Washington, D.C.	Inactive	
Kappa Phi	June 5, 1909 – 1914; 2001–2004	Mount Union College	Alliance, Ohio	Inactive	(Note: Chapter formed from Kappa Phi local, established in 1882.)
Alpha Alpha	May 1913 – 1936; December 9, 1950 – 1992; 1995–2000	Miami University	Oxford, Ohio	Inactive	(Note: Chapter formed from Pi Alpha Tau (local), founded in 1912.)
**Alpha Beta**	November 27, 1914	Truman State University	Kirksville, Missouri	Active	(Note: Chapter formed from Kappa Theta Psi (local), established in 1899.)
**Alpha Gamma**	November 15, 1914 – 1919; 1928	Indiana University of Pennsylvania	Indiana, Pennsylvania	Active	(Note: Chapter formed from Gamma Pi Beta (local), established in 1902.)
**Beta Beta**	February 19, 1916	University of Northern Colorado	Greeley, Colorado	Active	(Note: Chapter formed from Theta Zeta Beta (local), established in 1909.)
Gamma Gamma	February 23, 1916 – 1952; 200x ?–2020	Northwestern Oklahoma State University	Alva, Oklahoma	Inactive	(Note: Originated as the Sorosis Club (local), established in 1907. Not to be confused with I. C. Sorosis, the original name of Pi Beta Phi.)
Delta Delta	April 20, 1917 – 1932	Ohio University	Athens, Ohio	Inactive	(Note: Originated as Alpha Sigma Delta (local), established in 1917.)
**Epsilon Epsilon**	November 17, 1915	Emporia State University	Emporia, Kansas	Active	(Note: Originated as Kappa Delta Theta (local), established in 1901.)
**Zeta Zeta**	April 4, 1919	University of Central Missouri	Warrensburg, Missouri	Active	(Note: Chapter originated as the X X Club (local), established in 1917.)
**Eta Eta**	July 10, 1920	Pittsburg State University	Pittsburg, Kansas	Active	(Note: Chapter originated as Gamma Tau Kappa (local), established in 1919.)
Theta Theta	November 12, 1921 – 1971	Boston University	Boston, Massachusetts	Inactive	(Note: Originated as Theta Theta (local), established in 1921.)
Iota Iota	January 13, 1922 – 1936	Drake University	Des Moines, Iowa	Inactive	(Note: Originated as the Grade Club (local), in 1921.)
Kappa Kappa	March 17, 1922 – 1995	Temple University	Philadelphia, Pennsylvania	Inactive	(Note: Chapter originated as Alpha Sigma Tau (local), established in 1919.)
Lambda Lambda	December 9, 1922 – 1934	Ohio State University	Columbus, Ohio	Inactive	(Note: Chapter originated as the Education Club (local), established in 1922.)
Mu Mu	January 19, 1924 – 1943	Eastern Michigan University	Ypsilanti, Michigan	Inactive	(Note: Chapter originated as Zeta Tau Alpha (local), established in 1910; not to be confused with the national sorority of the same name. Itbsorbed Delta Phi (local) in 1939.)
**Nu Nu**	May 13, 1925	Drexel University	Philadelphia, Pennsylvania	Active	(Note: Chapter originated as Omega Delta Epsilon (local), established in 1922.)
Xi Xi	January 24, 1926 – 1951	University of California	Los Angeles, California	Inactive	(Note: Chapter originated as the Xi Xi Society (local), established in 1925.)
Omicron Omicron	April 9, 1926 – 1939	Kent State University	Kent, Ohio	Inactive	(Note: Chapter originated as Phi Lambda Tau (local), established in 1925.)
Pi Pi	June 4, 1926 – 1954; 1978–1995	Buffalo State University of New York	Buffalo, New York	Inactive	(Note: Chapter originated as the Clionion (local), established in 1872.)
Rho Rho	May 14, 1927 – 1972	Marshall University	Huntington, West Virginia	Inactive	(Note: Chapter originated as Tau Mu Alpha (local), established in 1925.)
Sigma Sigma	May 25, 1927 – 1971	Western State College of Colorado	Gunnison, Colorado	Inactive	(Note: Chapter originated as Kappa Sigma Alpha (local), established in 1924.)
**Tau Tau**	March 17, 1928 – 1961; November 4, 2017	Fort Hays State University	Hays, Kansas	Active	(Note: Chapter originated as Gamma Sigma (local), established in 1920.)
Upsilon Upsilon	May 5, 1928 – 1930	Denison University	Granville, Ohio	Inactive	(Note: Chapter originated as Sigma Eta Sigma (local), established in 1927.)
**Phi Phi**	May 19, 1928	Northwest Missouri State University	Maryville, Missouri	Active	(Note: Chapter originated as Lambda Phi (local), established in 1927.)
Chi Chi (1)	1928–1933	Butler University	Indianapolis, Indiana	Inactive	(Note: Chapter originated as Phi Delta Psi (local), established in 1918.)
Psi Psi	May 31, 1930 – 1971; 2002–2013	Northwestern State University	Natchitoches, Louisiana	Inactive	(Note: Chapter originated as Sigma Alpha (local), established in 1928. It was reorganized in 2002 from Kappa Delta Sigma (local), established in 2001.)
Omega Omega	January 16, 1932 – 1939	San Diego State University	San Diego, California	Inactive	(Note: Chapter originated as Alpha Sigma Chi (local), established in 1930.)
Chi Chi (2)	June 2, 1936 – 1996	Ball State University	Muncie, Indiana	Inactive	(Note: Chapter originated as Sigma Alpha Sigma (local), established in 1920.)
Beta Gamma	November 20, 1937 – 1978; 1990–2014	Northeastern State University	Tahlequah, Oklahoma	Inactive	(Note: Chapter originated as Tau Beta Alpha (local), established in 1936.)
Beta Delta	May 20, 1939 – 1991	University of Southern Mississippi	Hattiesburg, Mississippi	Inactive	(Note: Chapter originated as Sigma Beta (local), established in 1937.)
**Beta Epsilon**	May 13, 1939	James Madison University	Harrisonburg, Virginia	Active	
Beta Zeta	November 2, 1940 – 19xx ?	University of Southwestern Louisiana	Lafayette, Louisiana	Inactive	(Note: Chapter originated as Zeta Delta Phi (local), established in 1938.)
Beta Eta	May 18, 1941 – 19xx ?	Dickinson State University	Dickinson, North Dakota	Inactive	(Note: Chapter originated as the A.S.A. Club in 1940.)
**Beta Theta**	November 15, 1941	Central Michigan University	Mount Pleasant, Michigan	Active	(Note: Chapter originated as Sigma Pi Delta (local), established in 1924.)
**Beta Iota**	May 9, 1942	Radford University	Radford, Virginia	Active	(Note: Chapter originated as Gamma Sigma Alpha (local), established in 1941.)
**Beta Kappa**	October 23, 1943 – 2003; May 3, 2015	Western Illinois University	Macomb, Illinois	Active	(Note: Chapter originated as Phi Tau Phi (local), established in 1942.)
**Beta Lambda**	March 4, 1944	University of Central Arkansas	Conway, Arkansas	Active	(Note: Chapter originated as Zeta Sigma (local), established in 1936. This appears to have been a regional Arkansas sorority, with two chapters. Both joined ΑΣΑ.)
**Beta Mu**	May 4, 1946	Henderson State University	Arkadelphia, Arkansas	Active	(Note: Chapter originated as Zeta Sigma (local), established in 1946. This appears to have been a regional Arkansas sorority, with two chapters. Both joined ΑΣΑ.)
**Gamma Clio**	May 4, 1946 – 1953; 2009	SUNY Cortland	Cortland, New York	Active	(Note: "Clio" in the chapter's name refers to this chapter's predecessor group, the Clionian Literary Society, formed in 1890.)
**Beta Nu**	May 18, 1946	Murray State University	Murray, Kentucky	Active	(Note: Chapter originated as Alpha Zeta (local), established in 1946.)
Beta Xi	May 18, 1941 – 1954	SUNY Oneonta	Oneonta, New York	Inactive	(Note: Chapter originated as Phi Kappa Chi (local), established in 1890.)
Rho Chi	September 14, 1947 – 1959	Wayne State University	Detroit, Michigan	Inactive	(Note: Chapter originated as Sigma Chi Rho (local), established in 1922.)
**Beta Pi**	September 27, 1947	Concord University	Athens, West Virginia	Active	
**Beta Sigma**	November 1, 1947	Missouri State University	Springfield, Missouri	Active	(Note: Chapter originated as the Merry-Go-Round club (local), established in 1925.)
**Beta Rho**	February 7, 1948	Northern Illinois University	DeKalb, Illinois	Active	
Beta Tau	October 13, 1951 – 1954	State University of New York at Oswego	Oswego, New York	Inactive	(Note: Chapter originated as Phi Kappa Chi (local), established in 1923.)
**Beta Upsilon**	October 6, 1951	Indiana State University	Terre Haute, Indiana	Active	(Note: Chapter originated as Psi Theta (local), established in 1905.)
Beta Phi	April 26, 1952 – 1979	University of Wisconsin, Stout	Menomonie, Wisconsin	Inactive	(Note: Chapter originated as the S.M.A. Club (local), established in 1923.)
Beta Chi	May 17, 1952 – 1964	Arizona State University	Tempe, Arizona	Inactive	
Beta Psi	April 18, 1953 – 1976	Western Michigan University	Kalamazoo, Michigan	Inactive	(Note: Chapter originated as the Alpha Sigma club (local), established in 1952.)
Beta Omega	October 24, 1953 – 1964	Bucknell University	Lewisburg, Pennsylvania	Inactive	(Note: Chapter originated as Phi Alpha Pi (local), established in 1946.)
Gamma Alpha	May 7, 1955 – 1971	Creighton University	Omaha, Nebraska	Inactive	
Gamma Beta	March 10, 1956 – 197x ?; 1994–1996	University of Wisconsin–Stevens Point	Stevens Point, Wisconsin	Inactive	(Note: Chapter originated as Psi Delta Psi (local), established in 1950. It was reformed in 1994 by Zeta Epsilon Nu (local).)
Gamma Delta	October 19, 1957 – 1971	Queens College, New York	Flushing, New York	Inactive	(Note: Chapter originated as Sigma Delta Chi (local), established in 1938.)
Gamma Epsilon	October 25, 1958 – 1973	School =University of Wisconsin-Milwaukee	Milwaukee, Wisconsin	Inactive	(Note: Originated as Alpha Delta Sigma (local), established in 1924.)
**Gamma Zeta**	October 10, 1961	University of Arkansas at Monticello	Monticello, Arkansas	Active	
**Gamma Eta**	May 5, 1962 – 2018; 2024	Pennsylvania State University	University Park, Pennsylvania	Active	
Gamma Theta	March 14, 1964 – 1970	Syracuse University	Syracuse, New York	Inactive	(Note: Chapter originated as Lambda Psi (local), established in 1962.)
**Gamma Iota**	May 23, 1964	Rochester Institute of Technology	Rochester, New York	Active	(Note: Chapter originated as Delta Omicron (local), established in 1921.)
Gamma Kappa	December 5, 1964 – 1975	Glenville State College	Glenville, West Virginia	Inactive	(Note: Chapter originated as Delta Omicron (local), established in 1921.)
**Gamma Lambda**	September 26, 1964	Loyola University	Chicago, Illinois	Active	(Note: Chapter originated as Chi Theta Upsilon (local), established in 1958.)
**Gamma Mu**	March 6, 1964	Adrian College	Adrian, Michigan	Active	(Note: Chapter originated as Beta Psi Zeta (local) before 1964.)
Gamma Xi	April 30, 1966 – 1997	Slippery Rock University of Pennsylvania	Slippery Rock, Pennsylvania	Inactive	
Gamma Omicron	March 6, 1967 – 199x ?	Clarion University of Pennsylvania	Clarion, Pennsylvania	Inactive	(Note: Chapter originated as Beta Chi Upsilon (local), established in 1958.)
Gamma Pi	September 30, 1967 – 1980; 198x ?–2018	Missouri Valley College	Marshall, Missouri	Inactive	
Gamma Rho	May 18, 1968 – 2007	East Stroudsburg University	East Stroudsburg, Pennsylvania	Inactive	(Note: Chapter originated as Sigma Tau (local) in 1966.)
Gamma Sigma	October 19, 1968 – 1974	Nicholls State University	Thibodaux, Louisiana	Inactive	
Gamma Tau	November 9, 1968 – 1974	Long Island University	Long Island, New York	Inactive	(Note: Chapter originated as Sigma Alpha Theta (local) in 1957.)
Gamma Upsilon	November 9, 1968 – 1974	New Mexico Highlands University	Las Vegas, New Mexico	Inactive	(Note: Chapter originated as Phi Lambda Kappa (local) in 1946.)
**Gamma Phi**	February 8, 1969 – 1972; February 1, 2014	St. John's University	Queens, New York	Active	(Note: Chapter originated as Delta Sigma Chi (local) in 1956. It reorganized in 2014 with the absorption of Kappa Phi Beta (local), a group that had formed in 1957.)
**Gamma Psi**	February 22, 1969	Edinboro University of Pennsylvania	Edinboro, Pennsylvania	Active	(Note: Chapter originated as Kappa Gamma Psi (local) in 1959.)
**Gamma Omega**	May 10, 1969	Eastern Illinois University	Charleston, Illinois	Active	(Note: Chapter originated as Gamma (local) in 1968.)
Delta Alpha	April 20, 1969 – 1971	University of Tampa	Tampa, Florida	Inactive	(Note: Chapter originated as Delta Chi Lambda (local) in 1967.)
Delta Beta	October 11, 1969 – 1971	Tennessee Technological University	Cookeville, Tennessee	Inactive	(Note: Chapter originated as Chi Omega Beta (local) in 1967.)
**Delta Gamma**	November 15, 1969 – 1973; 2015	West Chester University	West Chester, Pennsylvania	Active	(Note: Chapter originated as Delta Sigma Tau (local) in 1968.)
**Delta Epsilon**	May 16, 1970	Mansfield University of Pennsylvania	Mansfield, Pennsylvania	Active	(Note: Chapter originated as Chi Psi Omega (local) in 1966.)
Delta Zeta	February 6, 1971 – 1976	University of Wisconsin–Whitewater	Whitewater, Wisconsin	Inactive	
**Delta Eta**	May 15, 1971	DePaul University	Chicago, Illinois	Active	(Note: Chapter originated as Alpha Omega (local) in 1926.)
Delta Theta	May 13, 1972 – 1979	Southern Illinois University	Carbondale, Illinois	Inactive	
**Delta Iota**	April 22, 1972	University of Delaware	Newark, Delaware	Active	(Note: Chapter originated as Sigma Rho (local) in 1968.)
**Delta Kappa**	May 6, 1972	University of Southern Indiana	Evansville, Indiana	Active	
Delta Lambda	April 27, 1974 – 19xx ?	Virginia Polytechnic Institute	Blacksburg, Virginia	Inactive	
**Delta Nu - A**	May 10, 1975	Kettering University	Flint, Michigan	Active	(Note: "Kettering" originated as Alpha Sigma (local) in 1973. From the name similarity, it appears to have been a colonization with intentions to join ΑΣΑ. In a unique cooperative model, the student body is split into A and B branches; half work while half are in school, sharing the building.)
**Delta Nu - B**	May 10, 1975	Kettering University	Flint, Michigan	Active	(Note: "Kettering" originated as Alpha Sigma (local) in 1973. From the name similarity, it appears to have been a colonization with intentions to join ΑΣΑ. In a unique cooperative model, the student body is split into A and B branches; half work while half are in school, sharing the building.)
Delta Xi	September 20, 1975 – 19xx ?	Dallas Baptist University	Dallas, Texas	Inactive	
Delta Omicron	April 8, 1978 – 199x ?	York College of Pennsylvania	York, Pennsylvania	Inactive	(Note: Chapter originated as Lambda Sigma Chi (local) in 1942.)
Delta Pi	1977–199x ?	West Virginia State University	Institute, West Virginia	Inactive	
Delta Rho	May 6, 1978 – 2001	Elon University	Elon, North Carolina	Inactive	
**Delta Upsilon**	April 7, 1979	University of Texas at San Antonio	San Antonio, Texas	Active	
**Delta Chi**	January 26, 1979	Bloomsburg University of Pennsylvania	Bloomsburg, Pennsylvania	Active	
**Delta Sigma**	March 15, 1980 – 1981; 1997	Saginaw Valley State University	University Center, Michigan	Active	
Delta Tau	February 2, 1980 – 19xx ?	University at Buffalo	Buffalo, New York	Inactive	
**Epsilon Alpha**	September 25, 1982	Southern Arkansas University	Magnolia, Arkansas	Active	(Note: Chapter originated as Tau Delta Theta (local) in 1976.)
Epsilon Beta	April 30, 1983 – 1992	University of Illinois	Champaign, Illinois	Inactive	
**Epsilon Gamma**	February 25, 1984	Virginia Commonwealth University	Richmond, Virginia	Active	
Epsilon Delta	November 17, 1984 – 19xx ?	Saint Mary's University of Minnesota	Winona, Minnesota	Inactive	(Note: Chapter originated as the A.D.G. Little Sisters in 1982.)
**Epsilon Eta**	April 27, 1985	Virginia Wesleyan College	Norfolk, Virginia	Active	
**Epsilon Theta**	October 24, 1987	Penn State Erie, The Behrend College	Erie, Pennsylvania	Active	
Epsilon Iota	April 4, 1987 – 1992	Christian Brothers University	Memphis, Tennessee	Inactive	(Note: Chapter originated as Nu Sigma (local) before 1987.)
**Epsilon Kappa**	April 11, 1987	Millersville University of Pennsylvania	Millersville, Pennsylvania	Active	(Note: Chapter originated as Gamma Sigma Alpha (local) in 1966.)
Epsilon Lambda	March 28, 1987 – 2015	University of Pittsburgh at Johnstown	Johnstown, Pennsylvania	Inactive	(Note: Chapter originated as the Hearts Club, before 1987.)
Epsilon Mu	April 29, 1988 – 200x ?	The College of New Jersey	Trenton, New Jersey	Inactive	(Note: Chapter originated as the Independent Sisters (local) in 1986.)
Epsilon Nu	March 4, 1989 – xxxx ?	SUNY Brockport	Brockport, New York	Inactive	(Note: Chapter originated as Pi Theta Psi (local) in 1986.)
Epsilon Xi	April 8, 1989 – 19xx ?	Kutztown University of Pennsylvania	Kutztown, Pennsylvania	Inactive	
Epsilon Omicron	1989–1989	University of Pittsburgh at Greensburg	Greensburg, Pennsylvania	Inactive	
Epsilon Pi	October 26, 1991 – 1993	Tarleton State University	Stephenville, Texas	Inactive	
Epsilon Rho	October 21, 1989 – 200x ?	William Paterson College	Wayne, New Jersey	Inactive	
Epsilon Sigma				Unassigned	
**Epsilon Tau**	May 12, 1990	University of Maryland, Baltimore County	Baltimore, Maryland	Active	(Note: Chapter originated as Delta Alpha Delta (local) in 1986.)
**Epsilon Upsilon**	November 15, 1991	California University of Pennsylvania	California, Pennsylvania	Active	(Note: Chapter originated as Phi Lambda Delta (local) in 1989.)
**Epsilon Phi**	April 13, 1991 – 1994; 2013	Indiana University	Bloomington, Indiana	Active	
Epsilon Chi	May 11, 1991 – 20xx ?	Goldey-Beacom College	Wilmington, Delaware	Inactive	(Note: Chapter originated as Zeta Nu Epsilon (local) in the 1960s)
Epsilon Psi	October 31, 1992 – 2003; 2021–2023	Plymouth State University	Plymouth, New Hampshire	Inactive	(Note: Chapter originated as the Sisters of Progress Club in 1991.)
Epsilon Omega	November 17, 1992 – 1999	Bentley College	Waltham, Massachusetts	Inactive	(Note: Chapter originated as Delta Omega (local) in 1944.)
**Zeta Alpha**	February 6, 1993	Missouri Southern State University	Joplin, Missouri	Active	(Note: Chapter originated as Lambda Beta Phi (local) in 1973.)
Zeta Beta	April 3, 1993 – 2021	University of Wisconsin-River Falls	River Falls, Wisconsin	Inactive	(Note: Chapter originated as Lambda Delta Phi (local) in 1986.)
**Zeta Gamma**	April 24, 1993	Gannon University	Erie, Pennsylvania	Active	(Note: Chapter originated as Zeta Tau (local) in 1987.)
Zeta Delta	May 8, 1993 – 200x ?	Massachusetts College of Liberal Arts	North Adams, Massachusetts	Inactive	(Note: Chapter originated as Beta Chi Theta (local) in 1986.)
Zeta Epsilon	April 9, 1994 – 1999	Averett College	Danville, Virginia	Inactive	
**Zeta Eta**	April 23, 1994	Rockhurst University	Kansas City, Missouri	Active	
**Zeta Theta**	May 7, 1994	Wagner College	Staten Island, New York	Active	(Note: Chapter originated as the S.I.G. Club in 1992.)
**Zeta Iota**	November 19, 1994	Stony Brook University	Stony Brook, New York	Active	(Note: Chapter originated as the Athena Club in 1993.)
**Zeta Kappa**	November 4, 1995	Minnesota State University, Mankato	Mankato, Minnesota	Active	(Note: Chapter originated as Xi Delta Rho (local), before 1995.)
**Zeta Lambda**	April 27, 1996	Rowan University	Glassboro, New Jersey	Active	(Note: Chapter originated as Theta Pi Omicron (local) in 1976.)
**Zeta Mu**	May 4, 1996	Missouri Western State University	Saint Joseph, Missouri	Active	(Note: Chapter originated as Alpha Chi Delta in the 1970s.)
**Zeta Nu**	March 17, 1997	Moravian College	Bethlehem, Pennsylvania	Active	
Zeta Xi	March 21, 1998 – 2005	Lindenwood University	St. Charles, Missouri	Inactive	(Note: Chapter originated as Nu Sigma Sigma (local) in 1995.)
Zeta Omicron	March 28, 1998 – 2023	Muskingum University	New Concord, Ohio	Inactive	(Note: Chapter originated as the S.C.A.M. club in 1996.)
Zeta Pi	April 18, 1998 – 2021	Colorado State University - Pueblo	Pueblo, Colorado	Inactive	
**Zeta Rho**	May 10, 1996	University of West Alabama	Livingston, Alabama	Active	(Note: Chapter originated as Gamma Delta (local) in 1995.)
**Zeta Sigma**	November 21, 1998	University of the Incarnate Word	San Antonio, Texas	Active	
**Zeta Tau**	March 27, 1999	Grand Valley State University	Allendale, Michigan	Active	(Note: Chapter originated as Alpha Beta Chi (local) in 1993.)
**Zeta Upsilon**	April 10, 1999	Lynchburg College	Lynchburg, Virginia	Active	
**Zeta Phi**	October 23, 1999	Illinois Institute of Technology	Chicago, Illinois	Active	(Note: Chapter originated as the T.W.I.G. Club in 1997.)
**Zeta Chi**	October 28, 2000	Niagara University	Lewiston, New York	Active	
Zeta Psi	February 10, 2001 – 2019	Loras College	Dubuque, Iowa	Inactive	
Zeta Omega	February 24, 2001 – 2024	Austin Peay State University	Clarksville, Tennessee	Inactive	
**Theta Alpha**	March 3, 2001	Coe College	Cedar Rapids, Iowa	Active	
**Theta Beta**	February 16, 2002	Roanoke College	Salem, Virginia	Active	(Note: Chapter originated as the Iota Organization in 2000.)
**Theta Gamma**	March 20, 2004	Christopher Newport University	Newport News, Virginia	Active	
**Theta Delta**	April 17, 2004	University of Alaska Anchorage	Anchorage, Alaska	Active	
**Theta Epsilon**	March 25, 2006	Schreiner University	Kerrville, Texas	Active	(Note: Chapter originated as the I.P.O.S.C. club in 2005.)
**Theta Zeta**	April 5, 2008	Indiana University Indianapolis	Indianapolis, Indiana	Active	(Note: Chapter originated as Theta Zeta Psi before 2008.)
**Theta Eta**	February 8, 2009	Rogers State University	Claremore, Oklahoma	Active	
Theta Iota	May 23, 2009 – 2015	Oregon Institute of Technology	Klamath Falls, Oregon	Inactive	(Note: Chapter originated as Alpha Lambda Nu (local) before 2009.)
**Theta Kappa**	October 10, 2009	Texas A&M University - Kingsville	Kingsville, Texas	Active	(Note: Chapter originated as Psi Theta Upsilon (local) in 1993.)
**Theta Lambda**	February 27, 2010	Frostburg State University	Frostburg, Maryland	Active	(Note: Chapter originated as Alpha Gamma (local) in 2000.)
**Theta Mu**	April 10, 2010	Valdosta State University	Valdosta, Georgia	Active	
**Theta Nu**	May 22, 2010 – 2025	Knox College	Galesburg, Illinois	Inactive	(Note: Chapter originated as Alpha Theta Pi (local) in 2007.)
Theta Xi	November 20, 2010 – 2022	University of Texas at El Paso	El Paso, Texas	Inactive	(Note: Chapter originated as the New Delta club in 2007.)
Theta Omicron	March 19, 2011 – 2023	University of Missouri-Kansas City	Kansas City, Missouri	Inactive	(Note: Chapter originated as Beta Sigma Phi (local) in 1998.)
Theta Pi	October 29, 2011 – 2018	Utah Valley University	Orem, Utah	Inactive	(Note: Chapter originated as the Kappa Sisters club in 2009.)
**Theta Rho**	November 12, 2011	West Texas A&M University	Canyon, Texas	Active	
**Theta Sigma**	November 19, 2011	Southern Connecticut State University	New Haven, Connecticut	Active	(Note: Chapter originated as kappa Delta Xi (local) in 2000.)
**Theta Tau**	March 31, 2012	Capital University	Columbus, Ohio	Active	(Note: Chapter originated as Zeta Pi Lambda (local) in 1962.)
**Theta Upsilon**	March 16, 2013	Boise State University	Boise, Idaho	Active	
**Theta Phi**	March 15, 2014	UNC Pembroke	Pembroke, North Carolina	Active	
**Theta Chi**	March 29, 2014	Methodist University	Fayetteville, North Carolina	Active	
**Theta Psi**	April 11, 2015	Colorado Mesa University	Grand Junction, Colorado	Active	
**Theta Omega**	February 13, 2016	University of New Haven	West Haven, Connecticut	Active	
**Iota Alpha**	April 30, 2018	Suffolk University	Boston, Massachusetts	Active	
**Iota Beta**	October 29, 2016	Texas A&M University–Texarkana	Texarkana, Texas	Active	
**Iota Gamma**	November 12, 2016	Ramapo College	Mahwah, New Jersey	Active	
**Iota Delta**	February 4, 2017	Purdue University Fort Wayne	Fort Wayne, Indiana	Active	
Iota Epsilon	April 2, 2017 – 2022	Metropolitan State University of Denver	Denver, Colorado	Inactive	
**Gamma Chi**	April 22, 2017	Bryant University	Smithfield, Rhode Island	Active	
Iota Zeta	April 30, 2018 – 2021	Cleveland State University	Cleveland, Ohio	Inactive	
Iota Eta	April 7, 2018 - 2025	University of Arizona	Tucson, Arizona	Inactive	
**Iota Theta**	November 26, 2018	Columbia College (South Carolina)	Columbia, South Carolina	Active	
**Iota Kappa**	May 22, 2020	Abraham Baldwin Agricultural College	Tifton, Georgia	Active	
**Iota Lambda**	March 27, 2021	Flagler College	St. Augustine, Florida	Active	
**Iota Mu**	April 12, 2025	Bluefield State University	Bluefield, West Virginia	Active	
