= List of Sigma Kappa chapters =

Sigma Kappa is a sorority founded in1874 at Colby College in Waterville, Maine. In 1959, Sigma Kappa and Pi Kappa Sigma merged, which created many of the Delta series chapters.

== Collegiate chapters ==
Following is a list of Sigma Kappa collegiate chapters, with active chapters indicated in bold and inactive chapters in italics.

Chapter	Charter date and range	Institution	Location	Status	Ref.
Alpha	November 9, 1874 – 1984	Colby College	Waterville, Maine	Inactive	(Note: Chapter closed when the college's Board of Trustees withdrew recognition of all Greek organizations)
Beta	1890–1893	Colby College	Waterville, Maine	Consolidated	(Note: Absorbed into Alpha chapter in 1893)
Gamma	1892–1893	Colby College	Waterville, Maine	Consolidated	
**Delta**	March 7, 1904 – 1971; September 8, 1990	Boston University	Boston, Massachusetts	Active	
Epsilon	June 5, 1905 – 1998	Syracuse University	Syracuse, New York	Inactive	
**Zeta**	February 24, 1906 – 19xx ?; March 5, 1988	George Washington University	Washington, D.C.	Active	
**Eta**	February 22, 1906	Illinois Wesleyan University	Bloomington, Illinois	Active	
Theta	February 22, 1906 – 2016	University of Illinois at Urbana-Champaign	Urbana and Champaign, Illinois	Inactive	
Iota	February 21, 1908 – 1967; 1988–1993	University of Denver	Denver, Colorado	Inactive	
Kappa	February 21, 1908 – 1910	Brown University	Providence, Rhode Island	Inactive	
**Lambda**	April 23, 1910	University of California, Berkeley	Berkeley, California	Active	(Note: Chapter formed from Cnoc Tara (Celtic for "beautiful view"), a local sorority established in 1905.)
**Mu**	April 29, 1910	University of Washington	Seattle, Washington	Active	
Nu	July 13, 1911 – 1968	Middlebury College	Middlebury, Vermont	Inactive	
**Xi**	April 1, 1913	University of Kansas	Lawrence, Kansas	Active	(Note: Chapter formed from Delta Psi, a local sorority.)
Omicron	May 30, 1913 – 1956	Tufts University	Medford and Somerville, Massachusetts	Inactive	
Pi	July 13, 1915 – 1930	Stanford University	Stanford, California	Inactive	
Rho	June 2, 1917 – 1940	Randolph-Macon Women's College	Lynchburg, Virginia	Inactive	
Sigma	June 4, 1917 – 1964	Southern Methodist University	University Park, Texas	Inactive	
**Tau**	January 14, 1918 – 1994; Spring 2016	Indiana University	Bloomington, Indiana	Active	
**Upsilon**	May 31, 1918	Oregon State University	Corvallis, Oregon	Active	(Note: Chapter formed from the Tri Kappa Sorority)
**Phi**	March 8, 1919	University of Rhode Island	Kingston, Rhode Island	Active	
Chi	May 17, 1919 – 1998	Ohio State University	Columbus, Ohio	Inactive	
Psi	May 31, 1919 – 1958	University of Wisconsin–Madison	Madison, Wisconsin	Inactive	
Omega	May 29, 1920 – 1999	Florida State University	Tallahassee, Florida	Inactive	
Alpha Alpha				Unassigned	
Alpha Beta	June 25, 1920 – 1964	University at Buffalo	Buffalo, New York	Inactive	
**Alpha Gamma**	February 12, 1921 – June 1, 1980; January 23, 1988	Washington State University	Pullman, Washington	Active	(Note: Chapter formed from Phi Gamma Chi, a local sorority established before 1918 by Lambda, Mu, and Upsilon chapters sisters living in Pullman.)
**Alpha Delta**	April 16, 1921	University of Tennessee	Knoxville, Tennessee	Active	
**Alpha Epsilon**	May 4, 1921	Iowa State University	Ames, Iowa	Active	
Alpha Zeta	May 14, 1921 – 1957	Cornell University	Ithaca, New York	Inactive	
Alpha Eta	June 4, 1921 – 1961	University of Minnesota	Minneapolis and Saint Paul, Minnesota	Inactive	
**Alpha Theta**	July 5, 1922	University of Louisville	Louisville, Kentucky	Active	
Alpha Iota	September 30, 1922 – 2001	Miami University	Oxford, Ohio	Inactive	
Alpha Kappa	March 24, 1923 – 1972	University of Nebraska–Lincoln	Lincoln, Nebraska	Inactive	
Alpha Lambda	June 23, 1923 – 1976	Adelphi University	Garden City, New York	Inactive	
**Alpha Mu**	February 16, 1924	University of Michigan	Ann Arbor, Michigan	Active	
Alpha Nu	May 30, 1924 – 1981	University of Montana	Missoula, Montana	Inactive	
Alpha Xi	September 13, 1924 – 1932	University of Iowa	Iowa City, Iowa	Inactive	
Alpha Omicron	May 23, 1925 – 1993	University of California, Los Angeles	Los Angeles, California	Inactive	
Alpha Pi	June 12, 1925 – 1940	Ohio Wesleyan University	Delaware, Ohio	Inactive	
Alpha Rho	May 15, 1926 – 1940	Vanderbilt University	Nashville, Tennessee	Inactive	
**Alpha Sigma**	August 28, 1926	Westminster College, Pennsylvania	New Wilmington, Pennsylvania	Active	
**Alpha Tau**	May 28, 1927	Michigan State University	East Lansing, Michigan	Active	
Alpha Upsilon	March 31, 1928 – 1936	University of North Dakota	Grand Forks, North Dakota	Inactive	
**Alpha Phi**	April 28, 1928 – 1982; 1990–2004; 2015	University of Oregon	Eugene, Oregon	Active	(Note: Chapter formed from Sigma Beta Phi, a local sorority established in 1923.)
**Alpha Chi**	November 30, 1929	Georgetown College	Georgetown, Kentucky	Active	
Alpha Psi	January 3, 1931 – 1967	Duke University	Durham, North Carolina	Inactive	
**Alpha Omega**	November 12, 1932 – 1943; 1988–1995; 2018	University of Alabama	Tuscaloosa, Alabama	Active	
Beta Alpha				Unassigned	
Beta Beta	November 25, 1932 – 1936	University of South Carolina	Columbia, South Carolina	Inactive	
Beta Gamma	December 29, 1932 – 1955	University of Manitoba	Winnipeg, Manitoba, Canada	Inactive	
Beta Delta	March 27, 1939 – 1969	University of Miami	Miami, Florida	Inactive	
**Beta Epsilon**	March 16, 1940	Louisiana Tech University	Ruston, Louisiana	Active	
Beta Zeta	April 27, 1940 - December 12, 2025	University of Maryland, College Park	College Park, Maryland	Inactive	
**Beta Eta**	April 15, 1944	University of Massachusetts Amherst	Amherst, Massachusetts	Active	
**Beta Theta**	December 2, 1944	Marietta College	Marietta, Ohio	Active	
Beta Iota	April 7, 1945 – 1967	Carnegie Mellon University	Pittsburgh, Pennsylvania	Inactive	
Beta Kappa	February 8, 1947 – 1997	Colorado State University	Fort Collins, Colorado	Inactive	
Beta Lambda	February 15, 1947 – 1969	Utah State University	Logan, Utah	Inactive	
**Beta Mu**	April 19, 1947	Culver-Stockton College	Canton, Missouri	Active	
**Beta Xi**	May 3, 1947 – 2010; Fall 2015	University of Memphis	Memphis, Tennessee	Active	
**Beta Nu**	May 17, 1947	Bradley University	Peoria, Illinois	Active	
Beta Omicron				Unassigned	
Beta Pi	June 28, 1947 – 1959	Illinois Institute of Technology	Chicago, Illinois	Inactive	
Beta Rho	February 27, 1948 – 1971	San Jose State University	San Jose, California	Inactive	
**Beta Sigma**	September 25, 1948	Purdue University	West Lafayette, Indiana	Active	(Note: Chapter formed from Beta Xi, a local sorority established in 1946.)
**Beta Tau**	April 2, 1949	University of Florida	Gainesville, Florida	Active	
**Beta Upsilon**	May 14, 1949	Ohio University	Athens, Ohio	Active	
Beta Phi	January 14, 1950 – 1964	Idaho State University	Pocatello, Idaho	Inactive	
Beta Chi	January 28, 1950 – 2002	University of California Santa Barbara	Santa Barbara, California	Inactive	
**Beta Omega**	June 28, 1950	University of Nebraska Omaha	Omaha, Nebraska	Active	
Beta Psi	November 3, 1950 – 2007	San Diego State University	San Diego, California	Inactive	
**Gamma Alpha**	November 3, 1950	University of Northern Colorado	Greeley, Colorado	Active	
**Gamma Beta**	December 2, 1950	Western Michigan University	Kalamazoo, Michigan	Active	
**Gamma Gamma**	May 5, 1951	Indiana State University	Terre Haute, Indiana	Active	
**Gamma Delta**	January 5, 1952	Thiel College	Greenville, Pennsylvania	Active	
**Gamma Epsilon**	April 19, 1952	Indiana University of Pennsylvania	Indiana, Pennsylvania	Active	
Gamma Zeta	January 9, 1954 – 2018	Northern Illinois University	DeKalb, Illinois	Inactive	
**Gamma Eta**	March 20, 1954	Ball State University	Muncie, Indiana	Active	
**Gamma Theta**	June 30, 1954	California State University, Long Beach	Long Beach, California	Active	
Gamma Iota	March 12, 1955 – 1984	Texas Tech University	Lubbock, Texas	Inactive	
**Gamma Kappa**	April 23, 1955	Southern Illinois University	Carbondale, Illinois	Active	(Note: CHapter formed from Sigma Kappa Gamma, a local sorority established in December 1954. Pi Kappa Sigma merged into Sigma Kappa on May 26, 1959.)
**Gamma Lambda**	March 24, 1956	East Tennessee State University	Johnson City, Tennessee	Active	
**Gamma Mu**	April 7, 1956	Eastern Illinois University	Charleston, Illinois	Active	
Gamma Nu	May 20, 1956 – 1990	Gettysburg College	Gettysburg, Pennsylvania	Inactive	
Gamma Xi	October 26, 1957 – 1991	Lambuth University	Jackson, Tennessee	Inactive	
Gamma Omicron	April 26, 1958 – 1959	Morningside College	Sioux City, Iowa	Inactive	
Gamma Pi	September 27, 1958 – February 17, 2014	Kentucky Wesleyan College	Owensboro, Kentucky	Inactive	(Note: Chapter formed from Pi Sigma Chi, a local sorority established in 1937.)
Gamma Rho	November 8, 1958 – 1991	Western Carolina University	Cullowhee, North Carolina	Inactive	
Gamma Sigma	April 25, 1959 – 1965	Carroll College	Waukesha, Wisconsin	Inactive	
**Gamma Tau**	May 23, 1959	Midwestern State University	Wichita Falls, Texas	Active	
**Gamma Upsilon**	August 15, 1959	California University of Pennsylvania	California, Pennsylvania	Active	
**Gamma Phi**	April 23, 1960	North Carolina State University	Raleigh, North Carolina	Active	
Gamma Chi	June 28, 1960 – 1988	Stephen F. Austin University	Nacogdoches, Texas	Inactive	
**Gamma Psi**	January 21, 1961	Tennessee Wesleyan College	Athens, Tennessee	Active	
**Gamma Omega**	February 2, 1962	Wittenberg University	Springfield, Ohio	Active	
**Delta Alpha**	September 15, 1959	Eastern Michigan University	Ypsilanti, Michigan	Active	(Note: This chapter formed from the Alpha chapter of Pi Kappa Sigma as a result of the merger with Pi Kappa Sigma in 1959.)
Delta Beta	May 16, 1959 – 1984	Marshall University	Huntington, West Virginia	Inactive	(Note: This chapter was previously a chapter of Pi Kappa Sigma, joining Sigma Kappa as a result of a national merger of the two sororities.)
Delta Gamma	August 9, 1959 – 1975	Northwestern Oklahoma State University	Alva, Oklahoma	Inactive	
**Delta Delta**	September 26, 1959	Central Michigan University	Mount Pleasant, Michigan	Active	
Delta Epsilon	August 15, 1959 – 1974	Emporia State University	Emporia, Kansas	Inactive	
Delta Zeta	August 15, 1959 – 1985	Southeastern Oklahoma State University	Durant, Oklahoma	Inactive	
**Delta Eta**	July 12, 1959	University of Central Missouri	Warrensburg, Missouri	Active	
**Delta Theta**	August 15, 1959	Truman State University	Kirksville, Missouri	Active	(Note: Chapter formed at Northeast Missouri State University, later called Truman State University.)
**Delta Iota**	July 12, 1959	California State University, Chico	Chico, California	Active	
Delta Kappa	June 7, 1959 – 1968	Black Hills State University	Spearfish, South Dakota	Inactive	
Delta Lambda	September 15, 1959 – 1973	Wayne State University	Detroit, Michigan	Inactive	
Delta Mu	August 15, 1959 – 1995	Northwestern State University	Natchitoches, Louisiana	Inactive	
**Delta Nu**	August 15, 1959	Longwood University	Farmville, Virginia	Active	
Delta Xi	June 7, 1959 – 1970	Western State College	Gunnison, Colorado	Inactive	
Delta Omicron	June 7, 1959 – 1976	Fort Hays State University	Hays, Kansas	Inactive	
**Delta Pi**	September 26, 1959	Lock Haven University of Pennsylvania	Lock Haven, Pennsylvania	Active	
**Delta Rho**	August 5, 1959	James Madison University	Harrisonburg, Virginia	Active	
Delta Sigma	August 15, 1959 – May 2, 2011	Western Illinois University	Macomb, Illinois	Inactive	
**Delta Tau**	September 19, 1959	University of Central Arkansas	Conway, Arkansas	Active	
**Delta Upsilon**	August 15, 1959	Missouri State University	Springfield, Missouri	Active	
Delta Phi	August 15, 1959 – 1976	Fairmont State University	Fairmont, West Virginia	Inactive	
**Delta Chi**	August 15, 1959	University of Central Oklahoma	Edmond, Oklahoma	Active	
Delta Psi	August 15, 1959 – 2018	Radford University	Radford, Virginia	Inactive	
Delta Omega	August 15, 1959 – 1998	Waynesburg College	Waynesburg, Pennsylvania	Inactive	
Epsilon Alpha	February 24, 1962 – July 20, 2021	Lenoir-Rhyne University	Hickory, North Carolina	Inactive	
**Epsilon Beta**	April 7, 1962	University of New Orleans	New Orleans, Louisiana	Active	
Epsilon Gamma	November 2, 1962 – 1990	Southwestern Oklahoma State University	Weatherford, Oklahoma	Inactive	
**Epsilon Delta**	April 24, 1964	Susquehanna University	Selinsgrove, Pennsylvania	Active	
**Epsilon Epsilon**	June 17, 1964	University of Georgia	Athens, Georgia	Active	
**Epsilon Zeta**	June 17, 1964	Western Kentucky University	Bowling Green, Kentucky	Active	
**Epsilon Eta**	June 22, 1965	University of Findlay	Findlay, Ohio	Active	
Epsilon Theta	March 12, 1966 – 1971	University of Louisiana at Lafayette	Lafayette, Louisiana	Inactive	
Epsilon Iota	May 7, 1966 – 1971	Athens State University	Athens, Alabama	Inactive	
Epsilon Kappa	November 5, 1966 – 1984	Transylvania University	Lexington, Kentucky	Inactive	
**Epsilon Lambda**	May 28, 1967 – 19xx ?; May 11, 1991	California State University, Sacramento	Sacramento, California	Active	
**Epsilon Mu**	June 28, 1968 – 2004; September 2012	University of Missouri	Columbia, Missouri	Active	
Epsilon Nu	June 28, 1968 – 1984	University of Maine	Orono, Maine	Inactive	
Epsilon Xi	March 1, 1969 – 1983	Adrian College	Adrian, Michigan	Inactive	
Epsilon Omicron	June 11, 1969 – 1983	Texas State University	San Marcos, Texas	Inactive	
Epsilon Pi	May 24, 1969 – 1972	Northern Michigan University	Marquette, Michigan	Inactive	
Epsilon Rho	October 26, 1969 – 1977	Eastern Washington University	Cheney, Washington	Inactive	
Epsilon Sigma	June 20, 1970 – 1982	Armstrong State University	Savannah, Georgia	Inactive	
**Epsilon Tau**	June 20, 1970	California State University, Fullerton	Fullerton, California	Active	
Epsilon Upsilon	June 22, 1974 – 1990	Missouri Western State College	St. Joseph, Missouri	Inactive	
Epsilon Phi	October 30, 1971 – 1983	University of Southern Indiana	Evansville, Indiana	Inactive	
**Epsilon Chi**	May 21, 1972	Virginia Tech	Blacksburg, Virginia	Active	
Epsilon Psi	June 28, 1972 – 1982	Purdue University Calumet	Hammond, Indiana	Inactive	
**Epsilon Omega**	May 19, 1973	California Polytechnic State University	San Luis Obispo, California	Active	
**Zeta Alpha**	November 10, 1973	Indiana University Southeast	New Albany, Indiana	Active	
Zeta Beta	August 4, 1973 – 1978	University of Arkansas at Monticello	Monticello, Arkansas	Inactive	
**Zeta Gamma**	January 1, 1974	George Mason University	Fairfax, Virginia	Active	
Zeta Delta	April 27, 1974 – 1988	University of Tennessee at Martin	Martin, Tennessee	Inactive	
Zeta Epsilon	February 8, 1976 – 2000	California State University, Northridge	Los Angeles, California	Inactive	
**Zeta Zeta**	May 9, 1976	Babson College	Babson Park, Massachusetts	Active	
Zeta Eta	March 26, 1977 – 1981	California State University, Stanislaus	Turlock, California	Inactive	
Zeta Lambda	May 22, 1977 – 1988	Dartmouth College	Hanover, New Hampshire	Withdrew	(Note: Separated from the national organization to become the local sorority Sigma Delta)
**Zeta Kappa**	November 12, 1977	Angelo State University	San Angelo, Texas	Active	
**Zeta Iota**	November 19, 1977	Elmhurst College	Elmhurst, Illinois	Active	
Zeta Theta	December 3, 1977 – 1982	Tri-State University	Angola, Indiana	Inactive	
**Zeta Mu**	June 3, 1978	University of California, San Diego	San Diego, California	Active	
Zeta Nu	July 3, 1978 – May 25, 2017	The University of Texas at San Antonio	San Antonio, Texas	Inactive	
Zeta Xi	December 10, 1978 – 1983	Long Island University C.W. Post Campus	Brookville, New York	Inactive	
**Zeta Omicron**	May 14, 1978	University of Arizona	Tucson, Arizona	Active	
**Zeta Pi**	April 22, 1979	Colorado School of Mines	Golden, Colorado	Active	
Zeta Rho	May 3, 1980 – 1989	Lafayette College	Easton, Pennsylvania	Inactive	
**Zeta Sigma**	June 29, 1980 – 1984; November 15, 2015	University of Alabama-Birmingham	Birmingham, Alabama	Active	
Zeta Tau	June 29, 1980 – 1983	Colorado State University-Pueblo	Pueblo, Colorado	Inactive	
**Zeta Upsilon**	November 14, 1981	California State Polytechnic University, Pomona	Pomona, California	Active	
**Zeta Phi**	September 12, 1982 – May 3, 2021	Rutgers University	New Brunswick, New Jersey	Active	
Zeta Chi	November 13, 1982 – 1997	Florida Institute of Technology	Melbourne, Florida	Inactive	
Zeta Psi	July 30, 1983 – 1993	Cleveland State University	Cleveland, Ohio	Inactive	
Zeta Omega	February 4, 1984 – 1993	Louisiana State University	Baton Rouge, Louisiana	Inactive	
**Theta Alpha**	January 26, 1985	Appalachian State University	Boone, North Carolina	Active	
**Theta Beta**	February 22, 1986	University of La Verne	La Verne, California	Active	
Theta Gamma	March 15, 1986 – 2003	University of Louisiana at Monroe	Monroe, Louisiana	Inactive	(Note: Chapter formed at Northeast Louisiana University, now the University of Louisiana at Monroe)
**Theta Delta**	May 18, 1986	University of Delaware	Newark, Delaware	Active	
**Theta Epsilon**	June 1, 1986	University of California, Riverside	Riverside, California	Active	
**Theta Zeta**	April 26, 1987	University of Virginia	Charlottesville, Virginia	Active	
**Theta Eta**	May 3, 1987	University of Nevada, Las Vegas	Las Vegas, Nevada	Active	
**Theta Theta**	September 12, 1987	Albright College	Reading, Pennsylvania	Active	
**Theta Iota**	April 23, 1988	State University of New York at Fredonia	Fredonia, New York	Active	
Theta Kappa	January 28, 1989 – 1994	University of Southern California	Los Angeles, California	Inactive	
**Theta Lambda**	February 11, 1989	Massachusetts Institute of Technology	Cambridge, Massachusetts	Active	
Theta Mu	September 9, 1988 – April 30, 2023	University of North Carolina at Charlotte	Charlotte, North Carolina	Inactive	
Theta Nu	February 18, 1989 – 1994	Baylor University	Waco, Texas	Inactive	
**Theta Xi**	February 19, 1989	Auburn University	Auburn, Alabama	Active	
**Theta Omicron**	April 30, 1989 – xxxx ?; April 14, 2012	Arizona State University	Tempe, Arizona	Active	
**Theta Pi**	May 6, 1989	State University of New York College at Geneseo	Geneseo, New York	Active	
Theta Rho	February 10, 1990 – 2010	University of Kentucky	Lexington, Kentucky	Inactive	
Theta Sigma	April 28, 1990 – 2017	University of Hartford	Hartford, Connecticut	Inactive	
**Theta Tau**	January 26, 1991	Kansas State University	Manhattan, Kansas	Active	
**Theta Upsilon**	January 26, 1991 – May 8, 2025	Bowling Green State University	Bowling Green, Ohio	Active	
**Theta Phi**	February 10, 1991	University of Tennessee at Chattanooga	Chattanooga, Tennessee	Active	
**Theta Chi**	April 21, 1991	West Virginia University	Morgantown, West Virginia	Active	
**Theta Psi**	January 25, 1992	Pennsylvania State University	State College, Pennsylvania	Active	
Theta Omega	April 11, 1992 – 1998	Loyola University Chicago	Chicago, Illinois	Inactive	
**Kappa Alpha**	January 28, 1995	Northwest Missouri State University	Maryville, Missouri	Active	
**Kappa Beta**	January 27, 1996	Grand Valley State University	Allendale, Michigan	Active	
**Kappa Gamma**	February 4, 1996 – 2004; Spring 2017	University of Dayton	Dayton, Ohio	Active	
Kappa Delta				Unassigned	
Kappa Epsilon	March 23, 1997 – 2000	Pepperdine University	Malibu, California	Inactive	
**Kappa Zeta**	February 1, 1998	Elon University	Elon, North Carolina	Active	
**Kappa Eta**	April 19, 1998	Texas Christian University	Fort Worth, Texas	Active	
Kappa Theta	November 14, 1999 – December 8, 2012	Saint Louis University	St. Louis, Missouri	Inactive	
**Kappa Iota**	April 21, 2002	University of Pennsylvania	Philadelphia, Pennsylvania	Active	
Kappa Kappa				Unassigned	
**Kappa Lambda**	April 17, 2004	North Georgia College and State University	Dahlonega, Georgia	Active	
**Kappa Mu**	April 23, 2006	Duquesne University	Pittsburgh, Pennsylvania	Active	
**Kappa Nu**	May 3, 2006	Marquette University	Milwaukee, Wisconsin	Active	
**Kappa Xi**	December 2, 2006	University of Nevada, Reno	Reno, Nevada	Active	
**Kappa Omicron**	December 6, 2008	Florida International University	Miami, Florida	Active	
**Kappa Pi**	April 25, 2009	Clemson University	Clemson, South Carolina	Active	
Kappa Rho	May 9, 2009 – September 18, 2018	University of California, Irvine	Irvine, California	Inactive	
Kappa Sigma				Unassigned	
**Kappa Tau**	April 2, 2011	University of West Georgia	Carrollton, Georgia	Active	
**Kappa Upsilon**	April 16, 2011	The College of New Jersey	Ewing Township, New Jersey	Active	
**Kappa Phi**	December 3, 2011	Florida Atlantic University	Boca Raton, Florida	Active	
Kappa Chi				Unassigned	
**Kappa Psi**	December 11, 2011	Indiana University Indianapolis	Indianapolis, Indiana	Active	
**Kappa Omega**	April 13, 2013	Northeastern University	Boston, Massachusetts	Active	
**Lambda Alpha**	January 29, 2014	Spring Hill College	Mobile, Alabama	Active	
**Lambda Beta**	November 15, 2014	Coastal Carolina University	Conway, South Carolina	Active	
Lambda Gamma	December 6, 2014 – October 2024	Robert Morris University	Pittsburgh, Pennsylvania	Inactive	
Lambda Delta	December 6, 2014 – August 8, 2022	University of Houston	Houston, Texas	Inactive	
**Lambda Epsilon**	November 7, 2015	College of Charleston	Charleston, South Carolina	Active	
**Lambda Zeta**	November 21, 2015	University of South Florida	Tampa, Florida	Active	
**Lambda Eta**	April 3, 2016	American University	Washington, D.C.	Active	
**Lambda Theta**	November 12, 2016	University of Tampa	Tampa, Florida	Active	
**Lambda Iota**	June 14, 2017	Austin Peay State University	Clarksville, Tennessee	Active	
**Lambda Kappa**	July 8, 2019	Embry Riddle Aeronautical University	Daytona Beach, Florida	Active	

== Alumnae chapters ==
Following is a list of Sigma Kappa alumnae chapters, with active chapters indicated in bold and inactive chapters in italics.

Chapter	Charter date	Location	State	Status	Ref.
**Anderson / Muncie Alumnae**		Yorktown, Indiana	Indiana	Active	
Ann Arbor / Ypsilanti Alumnae		Ann Arbor, Michigan	Michigan	Inactive	
**Athens GA Alumnae**		Athens, Georgia	Georgia	Active	
**Athens TN Alumnae**		Athens, Tennessee	Tennessee	Active	
**Atlanta Alumnae**		Cumming, Georgia	Georgia	Active	
Austin Alumnae		Austin, Texas	Texas	Active	
**Baltimore Alumnae**		Baltimore, Maryland	Maryland	Active	
**Berks / Lancaster Alumnae**		Reading, Pennsylvania	Pennsylvania	Active	
**Boston Alumnae**	1904	Newton Center, Massachusetts	Massachusetts	Active	
**Birmingham Alumnae**		Gardendale, Alabama	Alabama	Active	
**Bloomington Alumnae**		Jefferson, Indiana	Indiana	Active	
**Buffalo Alumnae**		Buffalo, New York	New York	Active	
Central Arkansas Alumnae		Central Arkansas, Arkansas	Arkansas	Inactive	
**Central Florida Alumnae**		Orlando, Florida	Florida	Active	
**Central Iowa Alumnae**		Des Moines, Iowa	Iowa	Active	
**Central Ohio Alumnae**		Powell, Ohio	Ohio	Active	
**Charleston-Low Country Alumnae**		Mount Pleasant, South Carolina	South Carolina	Active	
**Charlotte Alumnae**		Kannapolis, North Carolina	North Carolina	Active	
**Charlottesville Alumnae**		Charlottesville, Virginia	Virginia	Active	
**Chattanooga Area Alumnae**		Chattanooga, Tennessee	Tennessee	Active	
**Chicago Alumnae**		Chicago, Illinois	Illinois	Active	
**Chicago Northwest Towns Alumnae**		Antioch, Illinois	Illinois	Active	
**Chicago South Suburban Alumnae**		Richton Park, Illinois	Illinois	Active	
**Chicago West Towns Alumnae**		Bloomingdale, Illinois	Illinois	Active	
**Cincinnati Alumnae**		Cincinnati, Ohio	Ohio	Active	
**Cleveland West Shore Alumnae**		Lakewood, Ohio	Ohio	Active	
Colorado Springs Alumnae		Colorado Springs, Colorado	Colorado	Inactive	
**Dallas Alumnae**		Lucas, Texas	Texas	Active	
**Dayton Alumnae**		Springboro, Ohio	Ohio	Active	
**Detroit Alumnae**		Waterford, Michigan	Michigan	Active	
**East Central Illinois Alumnae**		Champaign, Illinois	Illinois	Active	
**European Alumnae**		Washington, D.C.	District of Columbia	Active	
**Fort Worth Alumnae**		Fort Worth, Texas	Texas	Active	
**Gainesville Alumnae**		Gainesville, Florida	Florida	Active	
Grand Rapids Alumnae		Grand Rapids, Michigan	Michigan	Inactive	
**Greater Cleveland Alumnae**		Lyndhurst, Ohio	Ohio	Active	
**Greater Kansas City Alumnae**		Shawnee, Kansas	Kansas	Active	
**Greater Lansing Alumnae**		Greater Lansing, Michigan	Michigan	Active	
**Greater Louisville Alumnae**		Taylorsville, Kentucky	Kentucky	Active	
Greater Mid-South Tennessee Area Alumnae		Tennessee	Tennessee	Inactive	
**Greater New Orleans Alumnae**		Metairie, Louisiana	Louisiana	Active	
**Gulf Coast Alumnae**		Mobile, Alabama	Alabama	Active	
**Hawaii Alumnae**		Kapolei, Hawaii	Hawaii	Active	
**Houston Alumnae**		Katy, Texas	Texas	Active	
**Indianapolis Alumnae**		New Whiteland, Indiana	Indiana	Active	
**Jacksonville Alumnae**		St. Augustine, Florida	Florida	Active	
Jersey Shore Alumnae		Jersey Shore, New Jersey	New Jersey	Inactive	
**Knoxville Alumnae**		Maryville, Tennessee	Tennessee	Active	
La Jolla Alumnae		La Jolla, California	California	Inactive	
Lafayette Alumnae		Lafayette, Indiana	Indiana	Inactive	
**Las Vegas Area Alumnae**		Las Vegas, Nevada	Nevada	Active	
**Lehigh Valley Alumnae**		Easton, Pennsylvania	Pennsylvania	Active	
Lincoln Alumnae		Lincoln, Nebraska	Nebraska	Inactive	
**Long Beach Alumnae**		Long Beach, California	California	Active	
**Los Angeles Alumnae**		Redondo Beach, California	California	Active	
Manhattan Kansas Alumnae		Manhattan, Kansas	Kansas	Inactive	
**Miami Alumnae**		Miami, Florida	Florida	Active	
Military Alumnae		Worldwide		Inactive	
Mid-Missouri Alumnae		Mid-Missouri, Missouri	Missouri	Inactive	
Montana Alumnae		Montana	Montana	Inactive	
**Nashville Alumnae**		Nashville, Tennessee	Tennessee	Active	
**National Capital Region Alumnae**		Alexandria, Virginia	Virginia	Active	
New England Alumnae		New England	Massachusetts	Inactive	
**New Jersey Suburban Alumnae**		Maplewood, New Jersey	New Jersey	Active	
**New York City Alumnae**		New York City, New York	New York	Active	
**North Harris County Alumnae**		Spring, Texas	Texas	Active	
Northern Colorado Alumnae		Northern Colorado, Colorado	Colorado	Inactive	
Northern Delaware Alumnae		Wilmington, Delaware	Delaware	Inactive	
**Oklahoma City Alumnae**		Norman, Oklahoma	Oklahoma	Active	
**Omaha/Council Bluffs Alumnae**		Bellevue, Nebraska	Nebraska	Active	
**Orange County Alumnae**		Irvine, California	California	Active	
**Pasadena Area Alumnae**		Pasadena, California	California	Active	
**Peoria Alumnae**		Dunlap, Illinois	Illinois	Active	
**Philadelphia Alumnae**		Perkasie, Pennsylvania	Pennsylvania	Active	
**Phoenix Alumnae**		Phoenix, Arizona	Arizona	Active	
**Pittsburgh Alumnae**		Carnegie, Pennsylvania	Pennsylvania	Active	
**Pomona Valley Alumnae**		Upland, California	California	Active	
**Portland Alumnae**	1904	Hillsboro, Oregon	Oregon	Active	
**Richmond Alumnae**		Richmond, Virginia	Virginia	Active	
**Riverside County Alumnae**		Sun City, California	California	Active	
**Rochester Alumnae**		Rochester, New York	New York	Active	
**Rocky Mountain CO Alumnae**		Littleton, Colorado	Colorado	Active	
**Sacramento Alumnae**		Auburn, California	California	Active	
**St. Louis Alumnae**		St. Louis, Missouri	Missouri	Active	
**San Antonio Alumnae**		San Antonio, Texas	Texas	Active	
**San Diego Alumnae**		San Diego, California	California	Active	
**San Fernando Valley Alumnae**		Sherman Oaks, Los Angeles, California	California	Active	
**San Francisco/East Bay Alumnae**		San Francisco, California	California	Active	
San Jose/Bay Area Alumnae		San Jose, California	California	Inactive	
**Sarasota Area Alumnae**		Sarasota, Florida	Florida	Active	
**Scottsdale Alumnae**		Scottsdale, Arizona	Arizona	Active	
**Seattle Alumnae**		Sammamish, Washington	Washington	Active	
**Shreveport-Boosier City Alumnae**		Benton, Louisiana	Louisiana	Active	
**Sierra Nevada Alumnae**		Gardnerville, Nevada	Nevada	Active	
South Bay Alumnae		South Bay, California	California	Inactive	
South Coast Metro Alumnae		South Coast Metro, California	California	Inactive	
**South Oakland County Alumnae**		White Lake, Michigan	Michigan	Active	
Southern Kentucky Alumnae		Kentucky	Kentucky	Inactive	
**Southwest Florida Alumnae**		Lehigh Acres, Florida	Florida	Active	
**Southwest Missouri Alumnae**		Springfield, Missouri	Missouri	Active	
**Spokane Alumnae**		Spokane Valley, Washington	Washington	Active	
Tallahassee/Big Bend Area Alumnae		Tallahassee, Florida	Florida	Inactive	
**Tampa Alumnae**		Tampa, Florida	Florida	Active	
**Terre Haute Alumane**		Terre Haute, Indiana	Indiana	Active	
**Trenton-Delaware Valley Alumnae**		Franklin Park, New Jersey	New Jersey	Active	
**Tri-Cities Tennessee Alumnae**		Grey, Tennessee	Tennessee	Active	
Tri-Cities Washington Alumnae		Tri-Cities, Washington	Washington	Inactive	
**Tri-States Alumnae**		Camp Point, Illinois	Illinois	Active	
Triangle Area Alumnae		Raleigh, Durham, and Chapel Hill, North Carolina	North Carolina	Inactive	
**Toledo Alumnae**		Bowling Green, Ohio	Ohio	Active	
**Tuscaloosa Alumnae**		Tuscaloosa, Alabama	Alabama	Active	
**Virginia Beach Alumnae**		Virginia Beach, Virginia	Virginia	Active	
**Virtual Alumnae Group**		Carmel, Indiana	Indiana	Active	
Waterville Alumnae	1904	Waterville, Maine	Maine	Inactive	
**West Texas Alumnae**		Lubbock, Texas	Texas	Active	
**West Virginia Alumnae**		Huntington, Virginia	West Virginia	Active	
Western Lakeshore Alumnae		West Michigan, Michigan	Michigan	Inactive	
**Wichita Falls Alumnae**		Wichita Falls, Texas	Texas	Active	
**Williamsburg Alumnae**		Williamsburg, Virginia	Virginia	Active	
