= Calva Watson Wootton =

American educator and sorority founder

- Born: Calva Watson; 1886; Nottoway County, Virginia, U.S.
- Died: August 3, 1961 (aged 74–75); Petersburg, Virginia, U.S.
- Burial place: Blandford Cemetery
- Education: Farmville Normal School
- Occupation: Teacher
- Known for: Founder of Alpha Sigma Alpha
- Relatives: Walter Allen Watson (brother)

Calva Watson Wootton (1886 – August 3, 1961) is an American educator and one of the five founders of the national sorority Alpha Sigma Alpha.

== Early life ==
Calva Watson was born in on the Woodland plantation near Crewe in Nottoway County, Virginia. Her parents were Josephine and Meredith Watson, a lawyer, judge, and chairman of the Nottoway County Republican Party. Her father died in 1893 and her mother followed in 1913.

Wootton's family affectionately called her "Pig". Wootton loved sports and would often go hunting birds with the men. She had three sisters, Rebekah Watson Sutton, Hilary Watson Rolall, and Lois Waton Royal, and three brothers, H. Hunter Watson, M. Leon Watson, and congressman Walter Allen Watson.

She was educated by private tutors before attending Farmville State Female Normal School, now Longwood University. On November 15, 1901, Wootton was one of the five women who started Alpha Sigma Alpha sorority. She also served as the sorority's historian and secretary and participated in campus literary societies and language clubs. She graduated from college in June 1905.

== Career ==
After college, she became a teacher in a one-room school Sheppards, Virginia. She continued to teach in Petersburg after her marriage.

== Personal life ==
She married Percy Walton Wootton of Petersburg, Virginia on April 25, 1917, at her sister's home in Richmond, Virginia. Wootton was a farmer and a wholesale seed and fertilizer salesman. The couple lived in Petersburg at 2020 Matoax Avenue. They did not have children.

She was raised a Presbyterian but was a member of the First Baptist Church of Petersburg. In 1957, she was one of the founders of Alpha Sigma Alpha honored when a plaque was decidated at Longwood College.

Wootton died on August 3, 1961, in Petersburg at the age of 75. She was buried in Blandford Cemetery in Petersburg.
