= Alpha Sigma Tau =

American collegiate sorority

- ΑΣΤ
- Founded: November 4, 1899; 126 years ago Michigan State Normal College, (Ypsilanti, Michigan)
- Type: Social
- Affiliation: NPC
- Former affiliation: AES
- Status: Active
- Scope: National
- Motto: "Defining Excellence"
- Pillars: Intellect, Excellence, Graciousness, Respect, Connections
- Slogan: Defining Excellence
- Colors: Emerald Green and Gold
- Symbol: Anchor
- Flower: Yellow rose
- Jewel: Pearl
- Publication: The Anchor
- Philanthropy: Women's Wellness Initiative
- Chapters: 73 active
- Members: 72,000+ lifetime
- Headquarters: 3334 Founders Road; Indianapolis, Indiana 46268; United States
- Website: www.alphasigmatau.org

Alpha Sigma Tau (known as ΑΣΤ or Alpha Tau) is an American collegiate sorority founded 1899, at Eastern Michigan University (formerly Michigan State Normal College). A member of the National Panhellenic Conference, the sorority has 78 active collegiate chapters at colleges and universities around the U.S. and over 65,000+ lifetime members.

== History ==
On November 4, 1899, eight women founded Alpha Sigma Tau's first chapter at Michigan State Normal College (now Eastern Michigan University). The founders were Mabel Chase, Ruth Dutcher, May Gephart, Harriet Marx, Eva O’Keefe, Adriance Rice, Helene M. Rice, and Mayene Tracy.

The name "Alpha Sigma Tau" was chosen, and emerald green and gold were chosen for the colors. Alpha Sigma Tau was initially founded as an educational sorority. There were three other sororities at Michigan State Normal College at the time: Pi Kappa Sigma (merged into Sigma Kappa), Sigma Nu Phi (local), and Zeta Phi (local, inactive).

Effie E. Polyhamus Lyman was selected as patroness. During the first year of its existence, the sorority did not display marked activity. The charter was received the following year, as Edith Silk, Myrtle Oram, Zoe Waldron, Grace Townley, Marie Gedding, Louise Agrell, and Mable Pitts had joined the organization and were the charter members. By suggestion of Mrs. Effie E. Polyhamus Lyman, Ms. Abigail Pearce, and Ms. Ada A. Norton were asked to be patronesses.

The Beta chapter was founded in 1905 at Central Michigan University (formerly Central Michigan Normal College) in Mt. Pleasant, Michigan. Its fifth chapter, Sigma, was chartered at Buffalo State College in 1925. That same year. Alpha Sigma Tau held its first convention in Detroit, Michigan; and published the first issue of The Anchor magazine.

In 1926, Alpha Sigma Tau became an initiated member of the Association of Education Sororities (AES). In order to be recognized, the sorority needed to hold a national convention, have five active chapters, and publish a magazine St. Louis, Missouri was chosen to be the location of the first national headquarters, in 1949 by then national president Dorothy Robinson.

In December 1951, AES merged with the National Panhellenic Conference (NPC). This merger permitted Alpha Sigma Tau to begin establishing chapters at any accredited school and admit members regardless of major.

The sorority's national philanthropy is the Women's Wellness Initiative. National headquarters was relocated to Birmingham, Alabama, in 1994.

== Symbols ==
Alpha Sigma Tau's motto is "Defining Excellence". Its core value or pillars are Intellect, Excellence, Graciousness, Respect, and Connections.

Its colors are emerald green and gold. Its flower is the yellow rose. Its jewel is the pearl. Its symbol is the anchor which symbolizes hope and strength. Its publication is The Anchor.

The sorority's badge is a six-pointed shield with a black enamel center that features the Greek letters ΑΣΤ and a gold border set in pearls. Its new member pin is a gold monogram of the Greek letters ΑΣΤ.

== Chapters ==
In 2025, Alpha Sigma Tau has 73 collegiate chapters and 37 alumni groups in North America.

== Notable members ==
The sorority has initiated more than 72,000 members.

- Mildred Doran (Alpha) – aviator
- Gwen Frostic (Alpha) – nature artist and environmentalist; inducted into Michigan Women's Hall of Fame
- Terri Utley (Upsilon) – Miss Arkansas USA 1982; winner of Miss USA 1982
- Cassie Donegan (Delta Eta) – Miss New York 2025; winner of Miss America 2026

== See also ==
- List of social sororities and women's fraternities
