= Pi Delta Theta =

American collegiate sorority

- ΠΔΘ
- Founded: February 14, 1926; 100 years ago Miami University
- Type: Social
- Former affiliation: AES
- Status: Merged
- Merge date: 1941
- Successor: Delta Sigma Epsilon
- Scope: National
- Colors: White, Gold, and Myrtle green
- Flower: Marguerite Daisy
- Publication: Thalia and The Myrsine
- Chapters: 9
- Members: 1,000 active
- Headquarters: United States

Pi Delta Theta (ΠΔΘ) was a national collegiate sorority operating in the United States from February 14, 1926, until it was absorbed by Delta Sigma Epsilon in September 1941.

== History ==
Before its formation, the sorority had help in 1925 from Ida Shaw Martin of the Sorority Service Bureau, who had been fielding requests for information from recently formed local sororities seeking national affiliation. She invited representatives of three organizations to send their faculty advisors to a meeting in Boston, Massachusetts, in the summer of 1925. Two responded affirmatively, which constitute both the founders and founding chapters of Pi Delta Theta:

- Mrs. Robert E. Brown, Kappa Theta Alpha (local) of Miami University of Ohio
- Miss Beulah Houlton, Zeta Sigma Alpha (local) of Kansas State Teachers College, Emporia

The organization was thus formed, with the Miami chapter being named its Alpha chapter, and Mrs. Brown was named as the first National President. Expansion began in earnest, but early chapters were lost as the Great Depression dragged on. In 1941, with WWII looming, the four remaining chapters opted for merger.

Pi Delta Theta was a member of the Association of Education Sororities, an NPC predecessor. The merger of Pi Delta Theta and Delta Sigma Epsilon was the only merger to occur within AES organizations.

Fifteen years later, in 1956, Delta Sigma Epsilon would itself merge with Delta Zeta.

== Symbols ==
- The badge consisted of the Greek letters Π and Θ in gold with a Δ set with pearls overlaying the other two letters.
- Colors were white, gold with myrtle green.
- The flower of Pi Delta Theta was the marguerite.
- The Sorority publications were the Thalia, which was published twice a year, and the Myrsine, which was published by the ex-collegio (alumnae) chapters four times a year.

== Governance ==
Government was vested in three entities: The national convention, the National Council, and the Board of Advisers.

== Chapters ==
The chapters of Pi Delta Theta were as follows.

Chapter	Charter date and range	Instituiton	Location	Status	Ref.
Alpha	February 14, 1926 – 1939	Miami University	Oxford, Ohio	Inactive	(Note: Predecessor group was Kappa Theta Alpha (local), formed in 1922.)
Beta	1926–1937	Emporia State University	Emporia, Kansas	Inactive	(Note: Predecessor group was Zeta Sigma Alpha (local), formed in 1925.)
Gamma	1927–1934	Pittsburg State University	Pittsburg, Kansas	Inactive	(Note: Predecessor group was Pi Omicron Pi (local), formed in 1925.)
Delta	1927–1932	Ohio University	Athens, Ohio	Inactive	
Epsilon	1927–1937	Kent State University	Kent, Ohio	Inactive	(Note: Predecessor group was Psi Chi Nu (local), formed in 1926.)
Zeta	June 1928 – 1941	Buffalo State College	Buffalo, New York	Merged (ΔΣΕ)	(Note: Predecessor group was Phi Delta Beta (local), formed in 1927. Joined the existing Areutha Upsilon chapter of Delta Sigma Epsilon.)
Eta	1929–1941	Eastern Michigan University	Ypsilanti, Michigan	Merged (ΔΣΕ)	(Note: Predecessor group was Theta Chi Sorority (local), formed in 1926. Joined the existing Eta chapter of Delta Sigma Epsilon.)
Theta	May 28, 1932 – 1941	University of Northern Colorado	Greeley, Colorado	Merged (ΔΣΕ)	(Note: Predecessor group was Pi Delta (local), formed in 1928. Joined the existing Gamma chapter of Delta Sigma Epsilon.)
Iota	October 25, 1935 – 1941	Indiana University of Pennsylvania	Indiana, Pennsylvania	Merged (ΔΣΕ)	(Note: Formed as a colony in 1935. Joined the existing Beta chapter of Delta Sigma Epsilon.)
