= Delta Sigma Epsilon =

Delta Sigma Epsilon may refer to:

- Delta Sigma Epsilon (Greek army), Democratic Army of Greece during the 1946–1949 civil war
- Delta Sigma Epsilon (sorority), a defunct American collegiate sorority
