= List of Pi Kappa Sigma chapters =

Pi Kappa Sigma was an American national collegiate pedagogical sorority. It was established in 1894 at the Michigan State Normal School. On May 15, 1959, Pi Kappa Sigma was absorbed by Sigma Kappa. The sorority chartered 51 chapters, mostly at normal schools and teachers colleges. Following is a list of chapters of Pi Kappa Sigma, with inactive chapters and institutions are in italics.

Chapter	Charter date and range	Institution	Location	Status	Ref.
Alpha	November 17, 1894 – May 15, 1959	Eastern Michigan College	Ypsilanti, Michigan	Merged (ΣΚ)	(Note: Chapter formed at the Michigan State Normal School, later Eastern Michigan College and now Eastern Michigan University.) (Note: Became a new Sigma Kappa chapter with the national merger of the two sororities.)
Beta	May 2, 1900 – May 15, 1959	Northwestern State College	Alva, Oklahoma	Merged (ΣΚ)	(Note: Chapter formed from Jolly Six, established in 1899 at the Northwestern Territorial Normal School. The school was later called Northwestern State College and is now Northwestern Oklahoma State University.)
Gamma	1902–1918, October 19, 1940 – May 15, 1959	Central Michigan Normal School	Mount Pleasant, Michigan	Merged (ΣΚ)	(Note: Chapter formed at Central Michigan Normal School, now Central Michigan University. After going dormant, the chapter reformed from the Roman Round Table, established in 1923.)
Delta	1905–1918	State Normal School at Cheney	Cheney, Washington	Inactive	(Note: State Normal School at Cheney became Eastern Washington University in 1937.)
Epsilon	1907–1911	Wisconsin State Normal School	Milwaukee, Wisconsin	Inactive	
Zeta	1909–1918, February 1, 1930 – May 15, 1959	State Teachers College at Indiana	Indiana, Pennsylvania	Merged (ΣΚ)	(Note: Chapter formed at the Indiana Normal School which became the State Teachers College at Indiana in 1927 and is now Indiana University of Pennsylvania. After going dormant, the chapter reformed from the Rho Club, established in 1928.) (Note: Merged with an existing Sigma Kappa chapter with the national merger of the two sororities.)
Eta	May 11, 1915 – 1938	Miami University	Oxford, Ohio	Inactive	(Note: Chapter formed from Gamma Delta Phi, established in 1911.)
Theta	1917–1919	Cincinnati College	Cincinnati, Ohio	Inactive	(Note: Chapter formed at Cincinnati College, now the University of Cincinnati.)
Iota	February 22, 1918 – May 15, 1959	Kansas State Teachers College	Emporia, Kansas	Merged (ΣΚ)	(Note: Chapter formed from Sigma Gamma, established in 1913 at the Kansas State Normal School, which became the Kansas State Teachers College in 1923 and is now Emporia State University.)
Kappa	1919–1923, November 17, 1929 – May 15, 1959	Southeastern State College	Durant, Oklahoma	Merged (ΣΚ)	(Note: Chapter formed at Southeastern State Normal School, which became the Southeastern State College in 1939 and is now Southeastern Oklahoma State University. After going dormant, the chapter reformed from Alpha Lambda Delta, established in 1927.)
Lambda	May 22, 1920 – May 15, 1959	Central Missouri State College	Warrensburg, Missouri	Merged (ΣΚ)	(Note: Chapter formed at Central Missouri State Teachers College, which became Central Missouri State College in 1945 and is now the University of Central Missouri.)
Mu	June 13, 1920 – May 15, 1959	Colorado State College	Greeley, Colorado	Merged (ΑΦ)	(Note: Chapter formed at the State Normal School of Colorado which became Colorado State College in 1957 and is now the University of Northern Colorado.) (Note: Became a chapter of Alpha Phi.)
Nu	February 17, 1922 – 1956	East Central Oklahoma University	Ada, Oklahoma	Inactive	(Note: Chapter formed from Phi Beta, established in 1915.)
Xi	February 10, 1923–1933	Ohio University	Athens, Ohio	Inactive	(Note: Chapter formed from Zeta Theta Upsilon, established in 1922.)
Omicron	June 2, 1923 – May 15, 1959	Marshall College	Huntington, West Virginia	Merged (ΣΚ)	(Note: Chapter formed from Alpha Tau Pi, established in 1922 at the State Normal School of Marshall College which became Marshall College in 1938. The college is now Marshall University.)
Pi	July 26, 1924 – May 15, 1959	Northeast Missouri State Teachers College	Kirksville, Missouri	Merged (ΣΚ)	(Note: Chapter formed at Northeastern Missouri State Teachers College, now Truman State University.)
Rho	June 5, 1925–1954	State University College for Teachers at Buffalo	Buffalo, New York	Inactive	(Note: Chapter formed from Theta Kappa, established in 1920 at the State Normal and Training School, which became the State University College for Teachers at Buffalo in 1951 and is now Buffalo State University.)
Sigma	May 28, 1925 – 1932	Drake University	Des Moines, Iowa	Inactive	
Tau	November 15, 1925 – May 15, 1959	Chico State College	Chico, California	Merged (ΣΚ)	(Note: Chapter formed from Pi Phi Beta, established in 1898 at the Chico State Teachers College, which became Chico State College in 1935 and is now California State University, Chico.)
Upsilon	October 24, 1925 – 1930	Florida State College for Women	Tallahassee, Florida	Inactive	(Note: Chapter formed from Pi Kappa, established in 1925 at the Florida State College for Women, now Florida State University.)
Phi	February 20, 1926 – 1939	University of California at Los Angeles	Los Angeles, California	Inactive	(Note: Chapter formed at the Southern Branch of the University of California which became the University of California at Los Angeles in 1927 and is now University of California, Los Angeles.)
Chi	May 26, 1926 – 19xx; October 29, 1939 - May 15, 1959	Black Hills Teachers College	Spearfish, South Dakota	Merged (ΣΚ)	(Note: Chapter formed from Alpha Pi Phi, established in 1925 at the Dakota Territorial Normal School which became the Black Hills Teacher College in 1941 and is now Black Hills State University.)
Psi	December 11, 1926 – 1947	Kent State University	Kent, Ohio	Merged (ΑΓΔ)	(Note: Chapter formed from Beta Tau Alpha, established in 1925 at Kent State Normal College, now Kent State University. Later, the chapter absorbed Chi Delta.) (Note: Became a chapter of Alpha Gamma Delta.)
Omega	October 22, 1927–1940	University of Southern California	Los Angeles, California	Inactive	(Note: Chapter formed from Pi Sigma, established in 1926.)
Alpha Alpha	November 12, 1927 – 1937	Alabama Polytechnic Institute Auburn University	Auburn, Alabama	Inactive	(Note: Chapter formed from Sigma Rho, established in 1923 at the Alabama Polytechnic Institute, now Auburn University.)
Alpha Beta	May 11, 1928 – 1941	College of Pittsburg	Pittsburg, Kansas	Inactive	(Note: Chapter formed from Sigma Phi Gamma, established in 1926 at the College of Pittsburg, now Pittsburg State University.)
Alpha Gamma	June 15, 1928 – May 15, 1959	Wayne State University	Detroit, Michigan	Merged (ΣΚ)	(Note: Chapter formed from Theta Chi, established in 1925 at the College of the City of Detroit, now Wayne State University.)
Alpha Delta	May 25, 1928 – May 15, 1959	Northwestern State College of Louisiana	Natchitoches, Louisiana	Merged (ΣΚ)	(Note: Chapter formed from Kappa Chi, established in 1926 at the Louisiana State Normal School which became Northwestern State College of Louisiana in 1944 and is now Northwestern State University.)
Alpha Epsilon	November 17, 1928 – May 15, 1959	Longwood College	Farmville, Virginia	Merged (ΣΚ)	(Note: Chapter formed from Pi Alpha, established in 1914 at the State Normal School for Women which became Longwood College in 1949 and is now Longwood University.)
Alpha Zeta	May 3, 1929 – May 15, 1959	Western State College of Colorado	Gunnison, Colorado	Merged (ΣΚ)	(Note: Chapter formed at Western State College of Colorado, now Western Colorado University.)
Alpha Eta	1929–1937	James Millikin University	Decatur, Illinois	Inactive	(Note: Chapter formed from the Women's Education Society, established in 1928 at James Millikin University, now Millikin University.)
Alpha Theta	May 25, 1929 – 1940	John B. Stetson University	DeLand, Florida	Inactive	(Note: Chapter formed from Pi Sigma, established in 1928 at John B. Stetson University, now Stetson University.)
Alpha Iota	1929–1937	Butler University	Indianapolis, Indiana	Inactive	(Note: Chapter formed from Psi Omega Epsilon, established in 1924.)
Alpha Kappa	May 16, 1930 – 1938	Harris Teachers College	St. Louis, Missouri	Inactive	(Note: Harris Teachers College is now Harris–Stowe State University.)
Alpha Lambda	1930–1936	Wittenberg College	Springfield, Ohio	Inactive	(Note: Chapter formed from Pi Epsilon, established in 1930 at Wittenberg College, now Wittenberg University.)
Alpha Mu	October 25, 1930 – 1940, 1957 – May 15, 1959	Fort Hays State College	Hays, Kansas	Merged (ΣΚ)	(Note: Chapter formed from Xi Kappa Psi, established in 1927 at Kansas State Teachers College of Hays, which became Fort Hays State College in 1931 and is now Fort Hays State University. After going dormant, the chapter reformed from Alpha Mu Club, established in 1956.)
Alpha Nu	May 18, 1935 – May 15, 1959	State Teachers College in Lock Haven	Lock Haven, Pennsylvania	Merged (ΣΚ)	(Note: Chapter formed from Rho Omega Lambda, established in 1915 at the State Teachers College in Lock Haven, now Commonwealth University-Lock Haven.)
Alpha Xi	May 14, 1939 – May 15, 1959	Southern Illinois University Carbondale	Carbondale, Illinois	Merged (ΣΚ)	(Note: Chapter formed from Alpha Rho, established in 1939 at the Southern Illinois Normal University which became Southern Illinois University Carbondale in 1947.)
Alpha Omicron	November 18, 1939 – May 15, 1959	Madison College	Harrisonburg, Virginia	Merged (ΣΚ)	(Note: Madison College is now James Madison University.)
Alpha Pi	October 24, 1943 – May 15, 1959	Western Illinois University	Macomb, Illinois	Merged (ΣΚ)	(Note: Chapter formed from Diana Club, established in 1926 at Western Illinois State Teachers College, now Western Illinois University.)
Alpha Phi	May 14, 1944 – May 15, 1959	Arkansas State Teachers College	Conway, Arkansas	Merged (ΣΚ)	(Note: Chapter formed from Alpha Phi Epsilon, established in 1928 at Arkansas State Teachers College, now the University of Central Arkansas.)
Alpha Chi	1945 – May 15, 1959	Ball State Teachers College	Muncie, Indiana	Merged (ΣΚ)	(Note: Chapter formed from Sigma Beta Tau, established in 1924 at Ball State Teachers College, now Ball State University.)
Alpha Rho	1945 – May 15, 1959	Northern Illinois University	DeKalb, Illinois	Merged (ΣΚ)	(Note: Chapter formed at Northern Illinois State Teachers College, now Northern Illinois University.)
Alpha Sigma	1946–1952	Henderson State Teachers College	Arkadelphia, Arkansas	Inactive	(Note: Henderson State Teachers College is now Henderson State University.)
Alpha Tau	1946–1957	District of Columbia Teachers College	Washington, D.C.	Inactive	(Note: Chapter formed from Omega Tau, established in 1945 at Wilson Teachers College which became the District of Columbia Teachers College in 1955 and is now University of the District of Columbia.)
Theta Nu	1947 – May 15, 1959	Southwest Missouri State College	Springfield, Missouri	Merged (ΣΚ)	(Note: Chapter formed from Theta Nu Epsilon, established in 1929 at Southwest Missouri State College, now Missouri State University.)
Alpha Omega	1948 – May 15, 1959	Fairmont State College	Fairmont, West Virginia	Merged (ΣΚ)	(Note: Chapter formed from Sigma Theta Rho, established in 1929 at Fairmont State College, now Fairmont State University.)
Alpha Upsilon	1950 – May 15, 1959	Central State College	Edmond, Oklahoma	Merged (ΣΚ)	(Note: Central State College is now Central Oklahoma University.)
Gamma Theta	1951 – May 15, 1959	Women's Division of Virginia Polytechnic Institute	Radford, Virginia	Merged (ΣΚ)	(Note: Women's Division of Virginia Polytechnic Institute is now Radford University.)
Delta Psi	1954–1958	University of Illinois Urbana-Champaign	Champaign, Illinois	Inactive	
Beta Alpha	1956 – May 15, 1959	Waynesburg College	Waynesburg, Pennsylvania	Merged (ΣΚ)	(Note: Chapter formed from Alpha Gamma Theta, established in 1909 at Waynesburg College, now Waynesburg University.)
