= Ida Shaw Martin =

American sorority founder and author

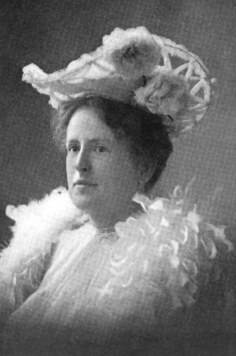
- Ida Shaw Martin, 1907
- Born: Sarah Ida Shaw; September 7, 1867; St. Louis, Missouri, US
- Died: May 11, 1940 (aged 72); Boston, Massachusetts, US
- Education: Boston University
- Known for: Founder of Delta Delta Delta, president of Alpha Sigma Alpha

Sarah Ida Shaw Martin (September 7, 1867 – May 11, 1940) was an American author, publisher, educator, and sorority founder. She founded the Delta Delta Delta sorority, Psi Psi Psi sorority, and was the author of The Sorority Handbook. She served as national president of two sororities -- Delta Delta Delta and Alpha Sigma Alpha. She also helped found and was chairman of the Association of Education Sororities.

== Early life ==
Shaw was born in St. Louis, Missouri on September 7, 1867. Her parents were Eliza and Edwin H. Shaw. When she was six years old, her family moved to Boston, Massachusetts. She attended public schools, completing her primary school education at Lowell Grammar School and Girls High School.

Sahe attended the Girls' Latin School in Boston, graduating as valedictorian in 1889. She then graduated from Boston Normal School. She attended Boston University. While there, she established Delta Delta Delta women's fraternity and was her class treasurer. She graduated with a A.B. in 1889, Phi Beta Kappa.

== Sorority involvement ==
=== Delta Delta Delta ===
Shaw established Delta Delta Delta women's fraternity in November 1888 with other Boston University students, Eleanor Dorcas Pond, Isabel Morgan, and Florence Isabelle Stewart. Shaw and Pond wrote the sorority's constitution, developed its rituals and symbols, and designed its emblem. She had extensive knowledge of Greek, Hindu, and Egyptian mythology, as well as astronomy, which aided her in the formation of the sorority's rituals.

After graduating from college, Shaw was the grand president of Delta Delta Delta from 1889 to 1893. She helped establish the Nu chapter at Ohio State University in 1896. From 1897 to 1900, she served on the fraternity's grand council as its first grand historian and was the grand officer in charge of the Grand Committee on Education. She composed "Hazing Song" that was included in the Songs of Delta Delta Delta, published in 1903.

In 1914, Shaw established Psi Psi Psi, a sorority for the mothers of Delta Delta Delta members. In 1938, she gave a radio address from her home in Boston for the Delta Delta Delta 50th Anniversary Convention attendees.

=== Alpha Sigma Alpha ===
Martin first connected with Alpha Sigma Alpha in 1904 while working on the first edition of The Sorority Handbook. She worked with the sorority to draft its first official constitution, create its ritual, and reorganize into a professional education sorority. She was also editor-in-chief of its publication, The Phoenix. Alpha Sigma Alpha awarded her honorary membership in May 1913. She was elected Alpha Sigma Alpha national president in 1914.

In 1920, she petitioned the National Panhellenic Conference (NPC) to accept Alpha Sigma Alpha as a member. However, her request was denied because women could not belong to two NPC organizations; Shaw Martin's dual membership in Delta Delta Delta and Alpha Sigma Alpha made the sorority ineligible for NPC membership.

At the sorority's 1930 national convention, Martin was removed from the office of president in a hostile takeover; she had served as the Alpha Sigma Alpha president for sixteen consecutive years.

=== Other organizations ===
In 1916, Martin helped found and was chairman of the Association of Pedagogical Sororities, later known as the Association of Education Sororities. She also created a Sorority Service Bureau, offering consultant services to sororities.

Martin served as the national treasurer of Pi Delta Theta sorority. In April 1932, her successor and other sorority representatives filed a case in Suffolk Superior Court, requesting that Martin turn over bank books and $12,717 ($300,090 in 2023 money) that was believed to be in the Pi Delta Theta bank accounts under Martin's control.

== Career ==
=== Education ===
After college, Shaw taught classical languages and German at the Medway High School in Massachusetts from 1889 to 1890 and the Meridan High School in Connecticut from 1890 to 1892. Next, she taught at the Clinton Liberal Institution in Fort Plains, New York from 1892 to 1893. This was followed by a position at the Lynn Classical High School in Massachusetts from 1894 to 1896. She left teaching when she married. However, in 1902, she was an unsuccessful candidate for the position of supervisor of the Boston Public Schools Board.

=== Publishing ===
Shaw wrote and published The Sorority Handbook, a directory for women's fraternities and sororities, and issued new editions every couple of years. She was also the sorority editor for Banta's Greek Exchange, a quarterly journal first published in December 1912.

== Personal life ==
Shaw married William Holmes Martin on December 24, 1896, at her family home on 5 Cobden Street in Boston. He was the principal/headmaster of Comins Grammar School in Boston. After getting married, she changed her name to Ida Shaw Martin. The couple lived in the Dorchester neighborhood of Boston.

She was a member of the Association of Collegiate Alumnae (now the American Association of University Women), The College Club of Boston, and the Southern Association of College Women. She was a member and director of the Massachusetts Society for the University Education of Women.

She updated her house at 5 Cobden Street to feature three triangles or the Greek letter Delton on top of its turret. She died in her home in Boston on May 11, 1940.

== Publications ==
- The Sorority Handbook. Boston, Massachusetts. 1907. (Full View Edition online
