= Theta Sigma Upsilon =

Defunct American collegiate sorority

- ΘΣΥ
- Founded: March 25, 1921; 105 years ago Emporia State University
- Type: Social
- Former affiliation: NPC; PPA
- Status: Merged
- Merge date: June 29, 1959
- Successor: Alpha Gamma Delta
- Scope: National
- Motto: "The Higher Good"
- Colors: Rose Silver
- Symbol: Helmet, Shield, Spear, Torch
- Flower: Pink Rose
- Tree: Pine and Dogwood
- Jewel: Pearls and Turquoise
- Patron Roman deity: Minerva
- Publication: The Torch
- Philanthropy: Association of Cleft Palate Rehabilitation.
- Chapters: 23
- Members: 4,912 (1957) active
- Headquarters: 65 Wandle Avenue; Bedford, Ohio; United States

Theta Sigma Upsilon (ΘΣΥ) was an American sorority founded on March 25, 1921, at Emporia State University. It chartered 23 chapters in the United States. The sorority merged with Alpha Gamma Delta on June 29, 1959.

== History ==
Theta Sigma Upsilon was founded on March 25, 1921, at Emporia State University. In 1925, the sorority became part of the Association of Education Sororities which it remained a member until the association dissolved when its members became part of the National Panhellenic Conference.

Alpha Gamma Delta absorbed Theta Sigma Upsilon at the 22nd international convention of Alpha Gamma Delta at French Lick, Indiana on June 29, 1959. Thirteen chapters were added to Alpha Gamma Delta from this merger, with these names as their new ΑΓΔ chapter designations:

- Alpha Rho-Temple University
- Alpha Tau-Edinboro University of Pennsylvania
- Alpha Sigma-Indiana University of Pennsylvania
- Alpha Upsilon-Central Michigan University
- Beta Theta-University of Wisconsin- Whitewater
- Gamma Kappa-Northwestern State University
- Gamma Lambda-Longwood University
- Gamma Mu-James Madison University
- Delta Iota-California State University, Chico
- Epsilon Kappa-Pittsburg State University
- Epsilon Iota-University of Northern Colorado
- Epsilon Lambda-University of Central Missouri
- Epsilon Mu-Fort Hays State University

== Symbols ==
Theta Sigma Upsilon's motto was "The Higher Good". Its colors were rose and silver. Its flower was the pink rose. Its trees were the dogwood and the pine. Its jewels were the pearl and turquoise. Its patron goddess was Minerva. Its publication was The Torch.

== Chapters ==
This is a list of Theta Sigma Upsilon chapters.

Chapter	Charter date and range	Institution	City and state	Status	Ref.
Alpha	March 25, 1921 – 1943; 1947–1951	Emporia State University	Emporia, Kansas	Inactive	(Note: Chapter formed the Sigma Society (local) in 1909, changing its name to Theta Sigma Upsilon in 1921.)
Beta	1923–1942	Eastern Michigan University	Ypsilanti, Michigan	Inactive	(Note: Chapter formed from the Treble Clef Club (local), established in 1908.)
Gamma	1924 – June 29, 1959	Temple University	Philadelphia, Pennsylvania	Merged (ΑΓΔ)	(Note: Chapter formed from the Alpha Epsilon Club (local), established before 1924. It became the Alpha Rho chapter of Alpha Gamma Delta.)
Delta	1924–1933	Miami University	Oxford, Ohio	Inactive	(Note: Chapter formed from Sigma Tau Delta (local), established in 1922.)
Epsilon	1924 – June 29, 1959	Pittsburg State University	Pittsburg, Kansas	Merged (ΑΓΔ)	(Note: Chapter formed from Theta Sigma (local), established in 1923. It became the Epsilon Kappa chapter of Alpha Gamma Delta.)
Zeta	1926–1931	Marshall University	Huntington, West Virginia	Inactive	(Note: Chapter withdrew to form Delta Xi Delta (local).)
Eta	1926–1947	Kent State University	Kent, Ohio	Inactive	(Note: Chapter formed from Beta Theta (local), established in 1924. It withdrew and became Theta Sigma Tau (local), which later became the Beta Zeta chapter of Gamma Phi t Beta.)
Theta	1927–1954	University at Buffalo (SUNY)	Buffalo, New York	Inactive	(Note: Chapter formed from Nu Lambda Sigma (local), established in 1924.)
Iota	1928 – June 29, 1959	University of Northern Colorado	Greeley, Colorado	Merged (ΑΓΔ)	(Note: This chapter can trace its origin to the Order of the Eastern Star Club, formed in 1922. That club formed a local sorority called Aleph Lamedh Tav in 1923. In 1927, it adopted became the local sorority named "Alpha Tau Lambda", which formed the Theta Sigma Upsilon chapter. It became the Epsilon Iota chapter of Alpha Gamma Delta with the national merger of the two sororities.)
Kappa	1928 – June 29, 1959	Northwestern State University	Natchitoches, Louisiana	Merged (ΑΓΔ)	(Note: Chapter formed from Beta Phi Zeta (local), established in 1927. It became the Gamma Kappa chapter of Alpha Gamma Delta.)
Lambda	1928–1931	Ohio University	Athens, Ohio	Inactive	(Note: Chapter formed from Sigma Upsilon (local), established in 1927. It withdrew in 1931 to become Delta Kappa (local), which merged with the small national Lambda Omega, which in turn merged with Theta Upsilon in September 1933. It was dormant between 1940–1946, re-established, and then went dormant again in 1952. Theta Upsilon would itself merge nationally with Delta Zeta in 1962.)
Mu	1928 – June 29, 1959	Fort Hays State University	Hays, Kansas	Merged (ΑΓΔ)	(Note: Chapter originated in 1921 as the Eastern Star Club (local) which became the Beta chapter of Epsilon Sigma in 1925. In 1927, it became a local named Zeta Sigma Phi, before joining Theta Sigma Upsilon. It became the Epsilon Mu chapter of Alpha Gamma Delta with the national merger of the two sororities.)
Nu	1928 – June 29, 1959	University of Central Missouri	Warrensburg, Missouri	Merged (ΑΓΔ)	(Note: Chapter originated as the Alpha chapter of Omega Epsilon Sigma in 1925. Before merging with ΘΣΥ it briefly became Omega Sigma (local). It became the Epsilon Lambda chapter of Alpha Gamma Delta with the national merger of the two fraternities.)
Xi	1929–1933	Western Colorado University	Gunnison, Colorado	Inactive	(Note: The chapter formed as a colony in 1928, closing five years later. Fraternities and sororities no longer exist on the Western Colorado campus.)
Omicron	1931 – June 29, 1959	California State University, Chico	Chico, California	Merged (ΑΓΔ)	(Note: Chapter formed from Delta Sigma local, established in 1924. It became the Delta Iota chapter of Alpha Gamma Delta.)
Pi	1935 – June 29, 1959	Indiana University of Pennsylvania	Indiana, Pennsylvania	Merged (ΑΓΔ)	(Note: Chapter formed from Theta Sigma (local), established in 1935. It became the Alpha Sigma chapter of Alpha Gamma Delta.)
Rho	1936 – June 29, 1959	University of Wisconsin–Whitewater	Whitewater, Wisconsin	Merged (ΑΓΔ)	(Note: Chapter formed from Theta Sigma (local), established in 1935. It became the Beta Theta chapter of Alpha Gamma Delta.)
Sigma	1937–1954	Harris–Stowe State University	St. Louis, Missouri	Inactive	(Note: Chapter formed from Phi Gamma Psi (local), established in 1928.)
Tau	1939 – June 29, 1959	Longwood University	Farmville, Virginia	Merged (ΑΓΔ)	(Note: Chapter formed from Delta Theta Alpha (local), established in 1936. It became the Gamma Lambda chapter of Alpha Gamma Delta.)
Upsilon	1941 – June 29, 1959	Central Michigan University	Mount Pleasant, Michigan	Merged (ΑΓΔ)	(Note: Chapter formed from Zet Chi Delta (local), established in 1941. It became the Alpha Upsilon chapter of Alpha Gamma Delta.)
Phi	1942 – June 29, 1959	James Madison University	Harrisonburg, Virginia	Merged (ΑΓΔ)	(Note: Became the Gamma Mu chapter of Alpha Gamma Delta.)
Chi	1944–1953	Drexel University	Philadelphia, Pennsylvania	Inactive	(Note: Chapter formed from Pi Sigma Gamma (local), established in 1934.)
Psi	1952 – June 29, 1959	PennWest Edinboro	Edinboro, Pennsylvania	Merged (ΑΓΔ)	(Note: Became the Alpha Tau chapter of Alpha Gamma Delta.)

== See also ==
- List of social sororities and women's fraternities
