= Sheppards, Virginia =

Unincorporated community in Virginia, United States

Coordinates: 37°23′27″N 78°29′7″W

Sheppards is an unincorporated community in Buckingham County, in the U.S. state of Virginia.
