= Association of Education Sororities =

Umbrella organization for teachers' organizations (1916–1947)

- Founded: 1916; 110 years ago Boston, Massachusetts, US
- Type: Umbrella
- Former affiliation: Professional Panhellenic Association
- Status: Merged
- Successor: National Panhellenic Conference
- Emphasis: Teacher's sororities
- Scope: National
- Members: 7 sororities active
- Headquarters: United States

The Association of Education Sororities (AES) was the former umbrella organization for teachers' sororities in the United States founded in 1916 until its merger with the National Panhellenic Conference in 1947. One of its members described it as an organization for "social sororities functioning in the field of education."

== History ==
On July 10, 1915, Sigma Sigma Sigma and Alpha Sigma Alpha held a preliminary conference in Cincinnati and then on September 4, 1915, in Boston formed a "panhellenic in education" between themselves, first called the Association of Pedagogical Sororities. These two sororities created the Association in order "to give the student in training for the teaching profession the same opportunities of sorority affiliation which the liberal arts students and those in other professions enjoyed," in response to a 1911 survey that found national sororities operated at almost all campuses except those of teaching schools.

Invitations were granted to Pi Kappa Sigma and Delta Sigma Epsilon in 1917. At the third national convention, the four sororities changed the name from Association of Pedagogical Sororities to Association of Education Sororities. Per the official meeting minutes, the name change was to "establish definitely professional standing in Hellas".

In 1920, Sarah Ida Shaw Martin, a founder and former national president of Delta Delta Delta and the current president of Alpha Sigma Alpha, petitioned the National Panhellenic Conference for membership on behalf of the AES. However, this request was rejected on the basis that women could not hold dual membership in two NPC organizations (as Shaw Martin would if the education sororities were accepted).

Three other sororities were admitted to AES membership through the next few decades: Theta Sigma Upsilon (1925), Alpha Sigma Tau (1926), and Pi Delta Theta (1931). In 1941, Pi Delta Theta merged with Delta Sigma Epsilon. By 1938, membership was restricted to groups on campuses that offered four-year education programs. The AES had local units on campus and in larger cities and held biennial conferences regularly from 1917 through 1947.

Shortly before its merger with the NPC, the AES was part of a larger multi-panhellenic association, the Council of Affiliated Panhellenics, with the NPC and the Professional Panhellenic Association.

=== Joining the National Panhellenic Conference ===
From 1915 through 1926, the National Panhellenic Conference (NPC) and AES sororities operated chapters in the same colleges and universities. In 1926, the NPC and AES made an agreement "defining fields of activities of each panhellenic". There was competition between NPC and AES sororities, and dual memberships were often held. By the 1940s, however, many teacher's colleges had begun to add liberal arts programs, and vice versa, which led to difficulties in functioning separately as they had had in the past.

On November 12, 1947, at a conference in Colorado Springs, Colorado, the NPC considered and granted associate membership "with reservations" to the six AES sororities. The AES was holding its biennial meeting when it was notified of the NPC decision and, at that meeting, "completed the necessary business and took formal action to dissolve the Association of Education Sororities".

The merger had various aftereffects, especially for alumnae. Dual memberships in NPC sororities were not allowed, so women who belonged to two sororities had to choose between their NPC or former AES sorority. After the merger, AES alumnae were also allowed to join City Panhellenic Associations, an action that went into effect on June 1, 1948. The chapters themselves also experienced changes. The NPC required former AES sororities to close chapters at colleges without regional accreditation. Former AES members continued previous functions in terms of finances and programs but were encouraged to have larger memberships for the next fall rush.

On June 1, 1948, the six former member organizations of AES were granted NPC associate membership and full membership in 1951. Since that time, three AES members have merged with other NPC groups, leaving Alpha Sigma Alpha, Alpha Sigma Tau, and Sigma Sigma Sigma as the remaining former AES members. Once functioning as sororities exclusively for teachers/educational colleges, the former AES members, as social sororities, now admit members without limits based on major.

== Programs ==
The Association implemented programs and financial structures keeping its members, young teaching students, in mind. The individual sororities developed a scale of fees concerning their own members' limited incomes, as well as participating in activities such as "student loan funds, establishment of hospital beds, local social service projects... [and] the endowment of a rural school library". By 1944, the Association had a Scholarship Award Committee which awarded fifty dollars each year to an undergraduate student at a teaching college.

The AES focused not only on educational (providing scholarships) and women-centric issues but also cooperated to support issues outside of the sorority world including defense projects during World War II. One of the projects started by the AES member groups resulted in what is today the world-renowned Leader Dogs for the Blind School in Rochester, Michigan.

Social Precedents and Sorority Ethics (1935) was a small guide written by three members of AES sororities. Lula McPherson (Pi Delta Theta), Zoe Davis Gose (Sigma Sigma Sigma), and Wilma Wilson Sharp (Alpha Sigma Alpha) guided readers in proper social etiquette and sorority behavior.

== Members ==
Its former members include current NPC members Sigma Sigma Sigma, Alpha Sigma Alpha, and Alpha Sigma Tau, as well as now-defunct sororities Delta Sigma Epsilon, Pi Kappa Sigma, Theta Sigma Upsilon, and Pi Delta Theta.
