= Delta Sigma Epsilon (sorority) =

Defunct American collegiate sorority

- ΔΣΕ
- Founded: September 28, 1914; 112 years ago Miami University
- Type: Social
- Former affiliation: NPC; AES
- Status: Merged
- Merge date: August 21, 1956
- Successor: Delta Zeta
- Scope: International
- Motto: Nihil sine labore
- Member badge
- Colors: Olive green and Cream
- Symbol: Cornucopia, Friendship Circle
- Flower: Cream tea rose
- Tree: Oak
- Publication: The Shield
- Chapters: 52
- Members: 13,001 lifetime
- Headquarters: United States

Delta Sigma Epsilon (ΔΣΕ) was a national collegiate social sorority founded at Miami University, operating in the United States from 1914 to 1956. It was originally a member of the Association of Education Sororities (AES) before the AES's merger with the National Panhellenic Conference, and most of its chapters were located at teaching colleges. The sorority was absorbed by Delta Zeta sorority in 1956.

== History ==
Delta Sigma Epsilon was organized at Miami University in Oxford, Ohio, on September 28, 1914. Dean Harvey C. Minnich, of the College of Education, selected several female students to form this organization. He selected them based on their academic records and character. These seven ladies were Marie Cropper, Ruth Gabler, Josephine McIntire, Charlotte Stark, Virginia Stark, Opal Warning, and Louise Wolfe. Throughout the next few decades, the sorority added chapters and joined an umbrella organization. In 1917, the fifth chapter, Epsilon, was installed. The sorority was admitted into the Association of Pedagogical Sororities. "From that date, Delta Sigma Epsilon played a leading role in determining and perfecting the policies of that national association, later renamed Association of Education Sororities."

Local chapters absorbed included the Zeta chapter of Arethusa/Sigma Gamma Phi at the State Normal and Training School (now SUNY Buffalo State College) in 1926. By 1930, Delta Sigma Epsilon had 28 active chapters, 17 alumnae associations, and 3,000 members. In 1941, Pi Delta Theta, a fellow associate sorority, merged with Delta Sigma Epsilon. This was the first and only merger within the Association of Education Sororities (AES).

In 1947, the National Panhellenic Conference (NPC) granted membership to the six remaining members of the AES, and the AES disbanded. Delta Sigma Epsilon was a part of the NPC. By 1949, the sorority had installed 46 chapters in the United States.

On August 21, 1956, at the conclave in New Orleans, the absorption of Delta Sigma Epsilon by Delta Zeta was announced. Several members of Delta Sigma Epsilon's former Grand Council held positions on their new sorority's grand council.

By the time of the merger, Delta Sigma Epsilon had 13,001 members, 44 active chapters, and eight inactive chapters. Deleting duplications, 34 chapters either became new Delta Zeta chapters or merged into existing chapters on their campuses, making this the largest merger in Panhellenic history. A few chapters were released to join other national groups: Tau chapter at Kent State University joined Alpha Chi Omega, Alpha Delta chapter at the Southern Illinois University joined Alpha Gamma Delta, and the Beta Gamma chapter at Marquette University joined Alpha Delta Pi.

== Symbols ==
Delta Sigma Epsilon's coat of arms featured an olive green and cream shield that featured a ring in the upper section and the Greek letters ωφ (Omega Phi) in the lower section. Between the two section was a band with seven stars, representing the fraternity's seven founders. There was a cornucopia above the shield, and a motto below bore the name Δελτα Σίγμα Εψιλον.

The fraternity's insignia or symbols are the cornucopia and the friendship circle. Its seal was a circle surrounded by another circle. The fraternity's motto was between the circles. The inner circle contained the fraternity's shield that bore the Greek letters "ΔΣΕ", a cornucopia, and a friendship circle.

Delta Sigma Epsilon's motto was Nihil sine labore. Its colors were olive green and cream. Its tree is the oak. The flower was the cream tea rose. Its magazine was The Shield, first published in 1917.

=== Pins ===
According to Florence Hood Miner's descriptions from her 1983 book, Delta Sigma Epsilon had the following pins and badges:

- Membership pin: "The official plain or pearl badge was a gold pin, shield shaped, having seven points, the edge being of pearls or gold. ΔΣΕ, the friendship circle, the cornucopia, and the secret motto in gold on a black background."
- Pledge pin: "...a small silver cornucopia bearing the letters ΔΣΕ"
- Patroness pin: " small gold friendship circle having the letters ΔΣΕ across the center"
- Mother's pin: "...black enamel and shaped like a shield. It was set with one ruby and bore the letters ΔΣΕ across the center"
- Recognition pin: "a small gold cornucopia bearing the letters ΔΣΕ"
- Grand Council badge: "a gold circle set with diamond circumscribing the official pin. The gold circle denoted eternal friendship and the diamonds denoted the number of terms of service on the Council, the maximum number limited to seven in honor of the founders."

=== Creed ===
Delta Sigma Epsilon's Creed follows:

I believe in Delta Sigma Epsilon and her power to develop character, scholarship, and leadership. I believe in the highest standards of womanhood which she maintains and the close friendship which she fosters. I believe in her power to give direction to the thoughts and lives of those women who are so fortunate as to be affiliated with her.

== Chapters ==
Delta Sigma Epsilon chapters were traditionally located on the campuses of normal schools or teachers' colleges. It chartered 54 chapters.

== See also ==
- Triad (American fraternities)
- List of social sororities and women's fraternities
