= Pi Kappa Sigma =

American pedagogical sorority

- ΠΚΣ
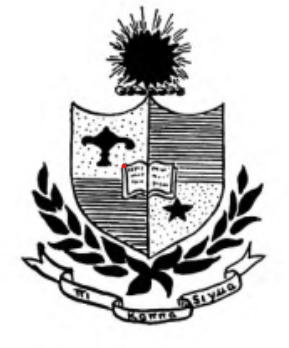
- Founded: November 17, 1894; 131 years ago Michigan State Normal School
- Type: Social
- Former affiliation: NPC; AES
- Status: Merged
- Merge date: May 15, 1959
- Successor: Sigma Kappa
- Emphasis: Pedagogy
- Scope: National (US)
- Member badge
- Colors: Turquoise and Gold
- Symbol: Lamp, Star, Phi, Open Book, Laurel Wreath, Scroll
- Flower: Forget-me-not and Jonquil
- Publication: The Laurel
- Chapters: 51
- Members: 11,000+ lifetime
- Headquarters: United States

Pi Kappa Sigma (ΠΚΣ or Pi Kap) was an American national collegiate sorority. Established in 1894 at the Michigan State Normal School, it was the first pedagogical sorority. The sorority was a member of the Association of Education Sororities and the National Panhellenic Conference. Pi Kappa Sigma was absorbed by Sigma Kappa in 1959.

== History ==
Student Georgia Fox and eight other students formed a secret club called J.P.N. at the Michigan State Normal School in Ypsilanti, Michigan on November 17, 1894. In a nod to the fashion of the day, the letters of this club stood for Jolly Petticoats Nine. Other J.P.N. members recall the secret meaning as Just Progressive Normalites. For three years, J.P.N. grew as a Latin-lettered club. In 1896, membership was thirteen.

In 1897, Alice Eddy Snowden assisted the J.P.N.s to transform into a Greek-lettered organization Pi Kappa Sigma. It was the first pedagogical sorority. Its second chapter was established at Northwestern State Teachers' College in 1900, followed by a chapter at Miami University in 1915.

In 1915, the sorority worked to become national and held its first national convention. There, the constitution was revised, a new membership pin was designed, goals were set for expansion, and a publication was authorized. National conventions were held every two years from 1915 up to 1931, then every three years. It was governed by a grand council that included five officers.

Pi Kappa Sigma's status as a "pedagogical sorority" prevented it from being admitted into the National Panhellenic Conference. In 1917, two members of the Association for Pedagogical Sororities (APS), Sigma Sigma Sigma and Alpha Sigma Alpha, invited Pi Kap to join their association. Pi Kap accepted. At the third APS national convention, the sororities changed APS to Association of Education Sororities (AES).

In 1923, Pi Kappa Sigma had seven chapters, five alumnae associations, 200 active members, and 1,500 total initiates. By 1930, the sorority had chartered 32 chapters and had initiated 3,000 members, although six chapters had closed. It also had alumnae chapters in Buffalo, New York; Cincinnati, Ohio; Cleveland, Ohio; Denver, Colorado; Detroit, Michigan; Huntington, West Virginia; Los Angeles, California; and Youngstown, Ohio.

In November 1947, the National Panhellenic Conference (NPC) invited Pi Kappa Sigma and the other AES members to join as "associate membership with reservations." With this invitation, the AES immediately dissolved. In June of the following year, the reservations cited by the NPC were removed. The former AES sororities became associate members of the NPC. Pi Kappa Sigma hoped to become a full member by 1951.

There were two problems for Pi Kappa Sigma and the move into the NPC. First, many Pi Kaps also held membership in NPC groups, having joined before 1947. These sisters were forced to choose between Pi Kappa Sigma and their NPC sorority, and Pi Kap suffered losses. The second problem was its inclusion of chapters at "unqualified institutions"; under the rules of the NPC, Pi Kap had to withdraw such chapters until those institutions could attain the proper accreditation. Again, Pi Kap lost members. After NPC affiliation, the sorority had 9,241 members, 32 active chapters, and 15 inactive chapters.

On May 15, 1959, Pi Kappa Sigma was absorbed by Sigma Kappa. Its total membership reported in the 1957 Baird's Manual was 11,013, two years before the merger with Sigma Kappa.

== Symbols and traditions ==
The coat-of-arms was authorized by the Grand Chapter in 1927 and is described as a "quartered shield [gold and blue] shaped like the pin. The upper dexter quarter is a Greek lamp; in the lower sinister quarter, a five-point star; at the point of interest, overlapping the quarters is an open book. The crest is an effulgent star of thirteen points resting upon a wreath. Beneath the shield are two crossed laurel branches; below them is a scroll with Pi Kappa Sigma in Greek letters."

The first badge was a shield design with "thirteen turquoise set in laurel leaves surrounding Pi Kappa Sigma" At the first convention, a new badge was designed because the newer members claimed that since other sororities had pins symbolizing secrets, so should the Pi Kappa Sigmas. The second badge was a modified triangular shield of black enamel with the Greek letters "ΠΚΣ", a Greek lamp in gold, and a small diamond surrounded by thirteen rays. The pledge pin was a modified triangle in turquoise-blue enamel with the Greek letters "ΠΚΣ" in gold.

Pi Kappa Sigma did not have a motto. The sorority's colors were turquoise and gold. Its symbols, from its insignia, were the lamp, star, Phi, open book, laurel wreath, and scroll. Its flowers were the Forget-me-not and Jonquilla. Its magazine was The Laurel, first published in 1918.

The first initiation ritual was that of J.P.N. In October 1902, a new initiation and pledge ritual was adopted. These rituals were "very similar" to what the sorority used in 1949. Minor changes in phrasing and a few additions were made in later years. Pledge ribbons were given to new members before the official pledging ceremony.

=== Founder's Day Prayer ===
Our heavenly Father, we thank thee for the joy of this day. We lift our voices in praise and thanksgiving for the blessings and comforts which come to us through our founders. We thank thee for all the tender mercies of the past and the great hopes that lead us into the future. We pray to fix in all our hearts the bright resolves to live nobly, truly, simply, and in the real spirit of Pi Kappa Sigma. May we, as loving children, remember that we are in the springtime of life. Help us to seize and improve every opportunity for the cultivation of our minds, the foundation of habits the preparation for future usefulness and gaining good. Lord, be near all on this day, and when we come together again, with thy help, O Lord, may we be better able to help each other and live that we may not forget the purpose for which we were founded and the all embracing love enclosed in the everlasting chain of friendship for Pi Kappa Sigma. We ask all these things in Jesus' Name. Amen.

—Written by Ruth S. Neidig, Grand President

=== An Ideal of Pi Kappa Sigma ===
Pledges herself to service of all on campus within the limits of her capacity.
In at home in the universe because in giving self she finds herself.
Keeps her sense of values, especially in emergencies.
Appreciates the contributions of townspeople, faculty, and students.
Promises to do only what she can see through to a finish.
Praises rather than blames the efforts of others.
Adjusts to situations where the good of her group surpasses her own personal opinion.
Stands by her ideals of Christian living.
Ignores gossip and fault finding.
Grows in poise and confidence.
Matures in her relationships with people.
Adds to life because of her humor, buoyancy, and wholesomeness.
—Virginia Wielandy, Faculty Advisor Alpha chapter

== Chapters ==
Pi Kappa Lambda chartered 51 chapters in the United States.

== See also ==
- List of social sororities and women's fraternities
