= Alpha Sigma Alpha =

American collegiate sorority

- ΑΣΑ
- Founded: November 15, 1901; 124 years ago The Virginia State Female Normal School (now Longwood University)
- Type: Social
- Affiliation: NPC
- Former affiliation: PPA; AES
- Status: Active
- Scope: National (US)
- Motto: "Aspire, Seek, Attain"
- Member badge

- Pledge pin
- Colors: Crimson and Pearl White, Palm Green and Gold
- Symbol: Phoenix, crown, palm tree, and star
- Flower: Narcissus, aster
- Jewel: Pearl and ruby
- Mascot: "DOT" Ladybug
- Publication: The Phoenix
- Philanthropy: Special Olympics, Girls On the Run International, The Alpha Sigma Alpha Foundation
- Chapters: 170 collegiate and alumnae
- Members: 120,000+ lifetime
- Headquarters: 9002 Vincennes Circle; Indianapolis, Indiana 46268; United States
- Website: www.alphasigmaalpha.org

Alpha Sigma Alpha (ΑΣΑ) is a United States National Panhellenic sorority founded on November 15, 1901, at the Virginia State Female Normal School (later known as Longwood College and now known as Longwood University) in Farmville, Virginia.

Once a sorority exclusively for teachers/educational colleges, Alpha Sigma Alpha became a full member of the National Panhellenic Conference in 1951, and, as a social sorority, now admits members without limits based on major. There are currently over 175 chapters of Alpha Sigma Alpha nationwide with more than 120,000 members. It is currently partnered with philanthropic organizations Special Olympics and Girls on the Run.

== History ==
=== Founding ===
In the fall of 1901, at Longwood University, five young women, all friends, decided to rush the local women's fraternities on campus. However, rather than accepting bids that would separate the group, they decided to form their own sorority. The founders were Virginia Lee Boyd-Noell (Virginia Boyd), Juliette Jefferson Hundley-Gilliam (Juliette Hundley), Calva Hamlet Watson-Wootton (Calva Watson), Louise Burks Cox-Carper (Louise Cox), and Mary Williamson-Hundley (Mary Williamson).

On November 15, 1901, Alpha Sigma Alpha was named and chartered. The charter stated "The purpose of the association shall be to cultivate friendship among its members, and in every way to create pure and elevating sentiments, to perform such deeds and to mold such opinions as will tend to elevate and ennoble womanhood in the world."

In the year after the charter was signed the founders announced the Sorority's first hymn, Blest Be the Tie that Binds, and first open motto, "to one another ever faithful". The first colors were crimson and silver, the flower was the white carnation, and the jewel was the emerald. The first membership badge of the Sorority was a shield topped with a jewel set crown, with the Greek letters "ΑΣΑ" inscribed in gold on a black background.

On February 13, 1903, Alpha Sigma Alpha was chartered in the circuit court of Prince Edward County, Virginia, by Judge George Jefferson Hundley, the father of one of the founding members. This chartering began the organization's legal existence, the first of many steps toward expanding the sorority and making Alpha Sigma Alpha a national sorority.

In 1907, Alpha Sigma Alpha had sixty active member and 200 total members from six chapters. It had also established an alumnae association.

=== Early challenges ===
Alpha Sigma Alpha expanded quickly, installing thirteen chapters in its first decade, and then began having issues due to the anti-sorority sentiment of the time, causing one of the chapters to be disbanded only months after its instatement. Despite the anti-sorority attitude, Alpha Sigma Alpha's first six chapters held its first National Convention at the Hotel Richmond in Richmond, Virginia, over the 1905 Thanksgiving weekend. During the convention, the first National Council was elected and the sorority created its magazine, to be published three times a year. This first publication was first printed in 1906. In 1908, the magazine's name was changed to the Aegis of Alpha Sigma Alpha. In 1911, Alpha Sigma Alpha became a professional sorority within the field of education.

Soon after, Alpha Sigma Alpha's chapters began to struggle with membership and function. Alpha Sigma Alpha first contacted Ida Shaw Martin – founder and former national president of Delta Delta Delta and author of the Sorority Handbook – for assistance in 1912. By that year, only four of the thirteen chapters established since the sorority's founding were left, and by the next, only one active chapter existed, the original Alpha chapter. Shaw Martin suggested that Alpha Sigma Alpha contact a local sorority at Miami, Ohio, which was then installed as a chapter. Shaw Martin's assistance led to her induction as an honorary member and the sorority's expansion at teacher's colleges. The sorority would absorb many more local chapters over the next few years.

As the sorority began to stabilize, it held a convention to reorganize itself over Thanksgiving in 1914. At this convention, the sorority adopted a constitution and modified its symbols, customs, and ritual. Here, Shaw Martin was elected national president, and the sorority renamed its magazine to its current name, The Phoenix, which became a weekly publication edited by Shaw Martin. It functioned "as the central medium linking the various parts of the Sorority... it consisted entirely of instructions and discussions of Sorority rulings and policy, chapter newsletters and excerpts from articles on morals and ethics for fraternal organizations."

In 1915, the sorority founded the Association of Education Sororities with Sigma Sigma Sigma to develop common standards for the formation and expansion of educational sororities. Although Shaw Martin petitioned the National Panhellenic Conference (NPC) in 1920, this request was rejected on the basis that women could not hold dual membership in two NPC organizations (as Shaw Martin would if the education sororities were accepted).

=== Modern day ===
In 1947, the six sororities of the AES voted to dissolve it and petitioned to join the National Panhellenic Conference. On November 27, 1951, Alpha Sigma Alpha was officially welcomed as a full member of the NPC. From that point on, Alpha Sigma Alpha could potentially establish a chapter at any university recognized by the NPC, no longer limited to those specific to the education profession.

Since then, Alpha Sigma Alpha has partnered with various nonprofits in the name of philanthropy. Its philanthropic efforts began in 1958 when it established scholarships for intellectually disabled students and those in special education. In 1976, the sorority's national headquarters announced a partnership with the Special Olympics. Since then, it has taken several other projects under its wing. The sorority added the S. June Smith Center, a day care center for intellectually disabled students, as a philanthropic partner in 1990.

In 1998, the sorority moved its national headquarters to Indianapolis, Indiana, and opened a new building a decade later in September 2008. It also adopted an official mascot that year, a ladybug named Dot.

Continuing its involvement with the Special Olympics, Alpha Sigma Alpha joined its campaign "Spread the Word to End the Word" in 2009. In 2012, the sorority added another national philanthropic partner, Girls on the Run. A national housing corporation was created in 2015.

== Symbols ==
The insignia of Alpha Sigma Alpha are the star, crown, palm tree, and phoenix. To the sorority, the star represents how its members should try to live up to the sorority's values, while the crown represents leadership and alumnae recognition. The palm tree represents strong development, and the phoenix, the coat of arms' central and largest symbol, openly represents the sorority's 1914 reorganization (or, a rebirth, linking it to the phoenix).

The first membership badge was a shield topped with a jewel set crown, with the Greek letters "ΑΣΑ" inscribed in gold on a black background. In 1903, the membership badge changed to the shape it has today. The sorority's badge is a concave square of black enamel with the Greek letters "ΑΣΑ" in gold, with a crown above and a star below. The badge is bordered in pearls and rubies. Its new member pin is a silver concave square with the Greek letters "ΑΣΑ" over the raised sun.

Alpha Sigma Alpha colors are crimson and pearl white. Its official flowers are the aster (the fall flower) and the narcissus (the spring flower). For jewels, the fraternity chose the pearl (for members before initiation) and the ruby (for initiated members), which are also linked to the sorority's primary colors. The original colors, flower, and jewel were respectively crimson and silver, the white carnation, and the emerald. Its symbols are the palm tree and the crown, which are linked to the secondary colors of palm green and gold. The sorority mascot is Dot the ladybug.

Alpha Sigma Alpha's publication is The Phoenix.

== Activities ==
In 2016, Alpha Sigma Alpha relaunched its membership education program, where members learn about the sorority's values. The program is broken down into four stages to correspond with four stages of membership, namely new members, initiates, senior members, and alumnae. The new member program includes online and in-person components, a handbook, a journal to reflect on the sorority's ritual, and a mentorship via an older collegiate member. Initiates also learn about the sorority's values online, have chapter programs, and may be certified to become a mentor to a new member if they wish. Graduating members have monthly meetings on how to transition from college and have a legacy project. Alumnae receive quarterly newspapers, blogs, and webinars.

The sorority currently runs a Sexual Assault Prevention Program, SPEAK UP, where members may watch videos online on topics including "healthy relationships, bystander intervention, self-care and consent, and alcohol and risk reduction." Collegiate chapters host one workshop per semester on such topics, facilitated by a trained regional staff member.

=== Service ===
Alpha Sigma Alpha has run a Service Immersion Experience for its members since 2013, which consists of a service trip where members travel to Oahu, Hawaii, and work with local organizations. In 2012, the sorority began a program called D.O.T. Days, or Donating Our Time Days, which take place during the first week of October every year. Sorority members "are encouraged to donate their time to the national philanthropic partners and local community."

=== Leadership ===
Various leadership programming exists for Alpha Sigma Alpha members, advisors, and volunteers. Advisors, volunteers, collegiate members, and alumnae may all attend the sorority's National Convention & Leadership Conference.

For its collegiate members, the sorority hosted its first leadership training school in 1966. In 1989, the sorority followed with its Emma Coleman Frost Leadership Development Institute. Collegiate members are also required to attend "The Academy", a program for leadership and networking. Graduating college seniors and alumnae have a Women's Advancement Series, which provides career feedback and help on connecting with local sisters.

Volunteers and advisors may attend a Region Volunteer Development Weekend or an Advisor Institute, respectively, which are each a weekend of leadership training and advice on chapter operations. The sorority began its leadership consultant program with their first traveling secretary in 1963, later called 'field representatives', before settling on its final name. Leadership consultants are the traveling staff of the national organization who educate college chapters on leadership and programming.

== Philanthropy ==
The sorority's various philanthropic partners include the Alpha Sigma Alpha Foundation, the S. June Smith Center, the Special Olympics, and Girls on the Run.

In 1986, Alpha Sigma Alpha combined the 1947 endowment fund and the development fund established in 1982 into the Alpha Sigma Alpha Foundation. Initially, it was a scholarship-granting body, but it has branched out to provide the sorority's members with grants and awards as well. The foundation also provides funds for chapter programming.

Two of the sorority's philanthropies focus on helping people with disabilities. The S. June Smith Center provides services to children with disabilities and their families, including various types of therapy and instruction. The center was named after an Alpha Sigma Alpha member, Dr. S. June Smith. The Special Olympics is an organization for children and adults with intellectual disabilities, providing year-round training and competitions worldwide.

The sorority's newest philanthropic partner is Girls on the Run, a non-profit which uses exercise to build healthy mental and physical habits in preteen girls.

== Awards ==
=== Collegiate awards ===
Collegiate members are recognized with awards for outstanding new members and sisters who exemplify service, academics, or athletics. Chapters also receive various awards.

Established in 1985, the Four-Star Chapter Award is given annually to collegiate chapters which excel in various areas. The areas covered include membership, academic excellence, finance, chapter education and operations, service and giving, national meetings and bylaws, organization image, policies and procedures, advisory board, and alumnae involvement. The chapter that achieves the highest percentage of requirements toward this award receives the Crown of Excellence Award, the top award that a collegiate chapter can receive.

Awards are also given to chapters which excel in single areas. Any collegiate chapter with the highest GPA on its campus for a school term receives the Scholastic Achievement Award. The Rose Marie Fellin Financial Excellence Award was established in 1992 in honor of its namesake's 27 years of service as the headquarters executive. The award is given to a chapter practicing sound financial management through record keeping, accurate financial reports, communication with national headquarters, as well as striving towards overall financial stability. The Recruitment Excellence Award was established in 2010 and is presented to a chapter that has met its recruitment targets for the year. This encompasses reaching campus quota and total, as well as innovation in planning and implementing a quality recruitment plan. Sidney Gremillion Allen Panhellenic Award, named after the sorority's NPC delegate, is given to the chapter that displays outstanding Panhellenic spirit and participation. The Service and Giving Award is given to a chapter that best exhibits generosity.

=== Alumnae awards ===
Alumnae chapters may receive several different awards: Palm, Star, or Crown Chapter; the Crown of Excellence; and Outstanding Membership Growth/Alumnae Panhellenic Engagement/Collegiate Chapter Relations/Programs/Community Involvement, Service and Giving.

Individual alumnae may receive their own awards. Alumnae whose professional or community achievements have attracted recognition outside of the sorority receive the Recognition of Eminence Award. First presented in 2012 at the sorority's national convention, the Alpha Sigma Alpha Foundation Heart of Giving Award is given to an alumna who has made a significant contribution of time or money to a charitable organizations. The Evelyn G. Bell Award, named after a past national president, is given to an alumna member who exhibits exceptional leadership, loyalty and commitment to the sorority by serving as a collegiate officer, alumnae officer, and national volunteer. Other awards presented to members for dedication and service to the sorority are the Helen Corey Award, the Wilma Wilson Sharp Award, the Agape Award, and the Outstanding Advisor Award.

== Chapters ==
There are currently over 175 chapters of Alpha Sigma Alpha in the United States.

== Farmville Four ==
Alpha Sigma Alpha is one of the "Farmville Four" sororities founded at the university, which includes Kappa Delta, Sigma Sigma Sigma, and Zeta Tau Alpha. A clock tower at the university campus with a clock face representing each sorority is dedicated to the four. Each sorority in the "Farmville Four" is also a member of the National Panhellenic Conference, which governs the 26 national social sororities.

== Notable members ==
Alpha Sigma Alpha has more than 120,000 members.

- Eden Wood (Beta Lambda) cast member of Toddlers & Tiaras
- Kennedy Holland (Beta Lambda) - 2025 Miss Arkansas Titleholder
- Hannah Blaylock (Beta Lambda) – former lead vocalist of Edens Edge
- Lauren Brie Harding (Beta Iota) – model who competed on the eleventh cycle of America's Next Top Model
- Xochitl Hinojosa – politician, communications director for the Democratic National Committee
- Dorcas Reilly – inventor of green bean casserole
- Freida J. Riley (Beta Pi) – teacher who influenced the Rocket Boys, subjects of the movie October Sky
- Denise Swanson (Gamma Lambda) – author

== See also ==
- List of social sororities and women's fraternities
