= National Panhellenic Conference =

Organization North American sororities

- NPC
- Founded: May 24, 1902; 124 years ago Chicago, Illinois
- Type: Umbrella
- Affiliation: Independent
- Status: Active
- Emphasis: Collegiate sororities
- Scope: North America
- Colors: Kelly green
- Members: 26 sororities active
- Former name: National Panhellenic Congress
- Headquarters: 12730 Meeting House Road, Suite 200; Carmel, Indiana 46032; United States
- Website: www.npcwomen.org

The National Panhellenic Conference (NPC) is an umbrella or trade association for 26 national and international women's sororities throughout the United States and Canada. Panhellenic (lit. 'all-Greek') refers to the group's members being autonomous social Greek-letter societies of college women and alumnae.

The National Panhellenic Conference provides guidelines and resources for its members and serves as a national voice on contemporary issues of sorority life. Founded in 1902, the NPC is one of the oldest and largest women's membership organizations, representing more than four million women at over 650 college and university campuses and 4,600 local alumnae chapters in the U.S. and Canada. Each year, NPC-affiliated collegians and alumnae donate more than $5 million to causes, provide $2.8 million in scholarships to women, and volunteer 500,000 hours in their communities.

The organization is a conference, not a congress, as it enacts no legislation and only regulates its own meetings. Other than basic agreements which its member groups must unanimously vote to follow, the NPC confines itself to recommendations and advice and acts as a court of final appeal in any college Panhellenic disputes. One of its services is providing advisors for sororities.

== History ==
Early histories of sororities contain accounts of rushing and pledging agreements or compacts among sororities on various campuses, and many stories of cooperation and mutual assistance. However, no actual Panhellenic organization existed and no uniform practices were observed. The NPC's origin can be traced to 1891, when Kappa Kappa Gamma invited all seven existing sororities to a Boston meeting, with the intention to meet again in 1893.

In 1902, Alpha Phi invited Pi Beta Phi, Kappa Alpha Theta, Kappa Kappa Gamma, Delta Gamma, Gamma Phi Beta, Delta Delta Delta, Alpha Chi Omega, and Chi Omega to a conference in Chicago on May 24 to set standards for collegiate sororities. Alpha Chi Omega and Chi Omega were unable to attend and joined the following year. The remaining seven groups met and the session resulted in the organization of the Inter-Sorority Conference, the first interfraternity association and the first intergroup organization on college campuses. The first few meetings resulted in several mutual agreements, especially regarding pledging. Up to this time, no guidelines had been set, and women could be pledged to groups before enrolling in college and belong to more than one group. It became the National Panhellenic Conference in 1908 and the National Panhellenic Congress in 1911.

Many sororities joined through the next decade, with Alpha Xi Delta in 1904, Alpha Omicron Pi and Sigma Kappa in 1905, Alpha Delta Pi and Alpha Gamma Delta and Zeta Tau Alpha in 1909, Delta Zeta in 1910, Phi Mu in 1911, and Kappa Delta in 1912. No new member organizations were admitted for the next few decades.

Throughout its early years, NPC members were often racially and religiously segregated and rarely admitted Jewish, Catholic, or ethnic minority members, which led to the formation of group-specific sororities which attempted to provide the same social and academic outlets to groups who were otherwise excluded from membership. These groups included the first Black Greek letter organizations.

In 1917, it changed back to the National Panhellenic Conference, only to return to the National Panhellenic Congress name in 1921. By 1922, the NPC had an executive committee consisting of a chairman, secretary, and treasurer; a publicity board; and a delegate board with at least one representative from each of its eighteen senior members. That year, the congress also began plans for a centralized headquarters to coordinate and streamline interactions with the separate sororities.

The Association of Education Sororities (AES) merged with NPC in 1947. Shortly before its merger with the NPC, the AES was part of a larger multi-panhellenic association, the Council of Affiliated Panhellenics. Created in 1941, it included the AES, NPC, and Professional Panhellenic Association as members. At the time of its merger with NPC, AES included six member organizations.

In 1945, NPC returned to its current name of the National Panhellenic Conference. From the 1940s to the 1960s, various smaller organizations merged into larger ones. On some campuses with two different chapters from merged sororities, a third sorority would organize on the campus to absorb the smaller sorority's former chapter. By the end of the 1960s and the civil rights movement, NPC sororities eliminated official policies that prevented minority members from joining, although diversity in Greek life remained an issue.

=== 21st century ===
As of the 2010s, sorority members and outside observers noticed a shift in sorority culture; though sororities began as feminist organizations, emphasis during the mid-1900s on social reputations and exclusionary recruitment policies (such as a refusal to recruit Jewish and African-American women) led to a reputation for following cultural hegemony and being made up of upper-class white women. Though such issues continue to persist in various ways, sorority and anti-sorority women alike observed sororities becoming more ethnically diverse and moving away from traditional power structures towards their feminist roots. In the 2010s, sorority members began attempts to change how sororities work from within.

In November 2015, eight NPC members (Alpha Phi, Alpha Chi Omega, Phi Mu, Alpha Gamma Delta, Sigma Delta Tau, Delta Phi Epsilon, Delta Gamma, and Gamma Phi Beta) broke ranks from the NPC to withdraw their support for the Safe Campus Act, a controversial bill that would have required campus sexual assault victims to report to police and submit to a law enforcement investigation before their school could begin its own investigation.

In 2016, collegiate members began discussing membership offers for transgender women, which was supported by some national organizations with changes to their national policies; however, some national organizations delayed membership offers for trans women due to fears about Title IX exemption status, which caused dissent in local chapters. Though the NPC created a gender identity study group to examine potential legal consequences, they concluded that the legal precedents were "incomplete, inconclusive, and inconsistent," and did not enact official policy or recommendations.

By 2021, most national organizations had released political statements on racial and social equity and inclusion, while also developing membership policies regarding gender identity. Delta Phi Epsilon developed a policy explicitly open to trans and non-binary individuals, and sororities open to anyone who identifies as a woman include: Alpha Chi Omega, Alpha Delta Pi, Alpha Epsilon Phi, Alpha Sigma Tau, Chi Omega, Delta Gamma, Gamma Phi Beta, Kappa Alpha Theta, Kappa Delta, Kappa Kappa Gamma, Phi Sigma Sigma, Sigma Sigma Sigma, and Theta Phi Alpha. Sororities open to anyone who identifies and lives as a woman include: Alpha Gamma Delta, Alpha Omicron Pi, Alpha Xi Delta, Delta Delta Delta, Pi Beta Phi, Sigma Delta Tau, and Sigma Kappa, while Zeta Tau Alpha specifies that the individual must consistently identify and live as a woman.

== Symbols ==
Panhellenic (lit. 'all-Greek') is the Greek word for "All Greek" and was selected to refer to the group's members being autonomous social Greek-letter societies of college women and alumnae.

The National Panhellenic Conference adopted its coat of arms in 1975. It features shield that symbolizes protection. On the shield is a laurel wreath that represents victory and the achievement of NPC ideals. The wreath is pierced by a sword that shows bravery, the "penalty of obligation", and a "willingness to fight for ideals". Above the shield is a lamp that symbolizes enlightenment, leadership, and scholarship. The shield is surrounded by a protective cloak, symbolizing education and the influence of NPC. Below and to the side of the shield is the mantle with the name National Panhellenic Conference. NPC's color is Kelly green.

== Affiliate organizations ==
=== Current members ===
Following are the current members of the National Panhellenic Conference.

Sorority	Greek letters	Founding date	Year joined NPC	References
Alpha Chi Omega	ΑΧΩ	October 15, 1885	1903	
Alpha Delta Pi	ΑΔΠ	May 15, 1851	1909	
Alpha Epsilon Phi	ΑΕΦ	October 24, 1909	1947 (associate), 1951 (full)	
Alpha Gamma Delta	ΑΓΔ	May 30, 1904	1909	
Alpha Omicron Pi	ΑΟΠ	January 2, 1897	1905	
Alpha Phi	ΑΦ	October 10, 1872	1902	
Alpha Sigma Alpha	ΑΣΑ	November 15, 1901	1947 (associate), 1951 (full)	
Alpha Sigma Tau	ΑΣΤ	November 4, 1899	1947 (associate), 1951 (full)	
Alpha Xi Delta	ΑΞΔ	April 17, 1893	1904	
Chi Omega	ΧΩ	April 5, 1895	1903	
Delta Delta Delta	ΔΔΔ	November 27, 1888	1902	
Delta Gamma	ΔΓ	December 25, 1873	1902	
Delta Phi Epsilon	ΔΦΕ	March 17, 1917	1947 (associate), 1951 (full)	
Delta Zeta	ΔΖ	October 24, 1902	1910	
Gamma Phi Beta	ΓΦΒ	November 11, 1874	1902	
Kappa Alpha Theta	ΚΑΘ	January 27, 1870	1902	
Kappa Delta	ΚΔ	October 23, 1897	1912	
Kappa Kappa Gamma	ΚΚΓ	October 13, 1870	1902	
Phi Mu	ΦΜ	March 4, 1852	1911	
Phi Sigma Sigma	ΦΣΣ	November 26, 1913	1947 (associate), 1951 (full)	
Pi Beta Phi	ΠΒΦ	April 28, 1867	1902	
Sigma Delta Tau	ΣΔΤ	March 25, 1917	1947 (associate), 1951 (full)	
Sigma Kappa	ΣΚ	November 9, 1874	1905	
Sigma Sigma Sigma	ΣΣΣ	April 20, 1898	1947 (associate), 1951 (full)	
Theta Phi Alpha	ΘΦΑ	August 30, 1912	1947 (associate), 1951 (full)	
Zeta Tau Alpha	ΖΤΑ	October 15, 1898	1909	

=== Former members ===
Following are former members of the National Panhellenic Conference.

Sorority	Greek letters	Founding date and range	Year joined NPC	Status	References
Alpha Delta Theta	ΑΔΘ	November 10, 1919 – August 30, 1939	1923 (associate), 1926 (full)	Merged (Phi Mu)	
Beta Phi Alpha	ΒΦΑ	May 8, 1909 – June 22, 1941	1923	Merged (Delta Zeta)	
Beta Sigma Omicron	ΒΣΟ	December 12, 1888 – August 7, 1964	1930 (associate), 1933 (full)	Merged (Zeta Tau Alpha and Alpha Phi)	
Delta Sigma Epsilon	ΔΣΕ	September 28, 1914 – August 21, 1956	1947 (associate), 1951 (full)	Merged (Delta Zeta)	
Iota Alpha Pi	ΙΑΠ	March 3, 1903 – July 1971	1953 (associate), 1957 (full)	Disbanded	
Lambda Omega	ΛΩ	October 31, 1915 – September 1933	1930 (associate)	Merged (Theta Upsilon)	
Phi Omega Pi	ΦΩΠ	March 15, 1910 – August 10, 1946	1930 (associate), 1933 (full)	Merged (Delta Zeta)	
Pi Kappa Sigma	ΠΚΣ	November 17, 1894 – May 15, 1959	1947 (associate), 1951 (full)	Merged (Sigma Kappa)	
Pi Sigma Gamma	ΠΣΓ	November 23, 1919 – 1932	1930 ?	Merged (Beta Sigma Omicron)	
Sigma Phi Beta	ΣΦΒ	November 1, 1920 – October 1, 1933	1928 (associate)	Merged (Phi Omega Pi)	
Theta Sigma Upsilon	ΘΣΥ	March 25, 1921 – June 29, 1959	1947 (associate), 1951 (full)	Merged (Alpha Gamma Delta)	
Theta Upsilon	ΘΥ	January 1, 1914 – May 6, 1962	1923 (associate), 1928 (full)	Merged (Delta Zeta)	

== Governance ==
Throughout its history the NPC Executive Board has been led by a chairman. In 2018 the NPC Board of Directors voted to change its governance model. As of 2021, members rotate onto the board in the order their organization joined the NPC, but the chairman is now elected.

A Panhellenic Council consists of executive board members at each university or college. Each institution holds different executive positions based on its size and the NPC's relationship with it. The basic positions at each institution are president, vice president of communications, vice president of finance, vice president of philanthropy and community service, vice president of programming, vice president of recruitment, vice president of scholarship, and vice president of judicial. The number of positions is based on the number of NPC sororities at each institution. Along with the delegates each being a representative from their sorority, the executive board includes a member from each sorority as well.

== See also ==
- List of social sororities and women's fraternities
