= List of Theta Phi Alpha members =

This is a list of Theta Phi Alpha alumnae and honorary alumnae.

== Entertainment ==
Name	Chapter	Notability	Ref.
Tisha Terrasini Banker	Alpha Beta	Actress known for Beware the Batman and Anatomy of Hope	
Terry Meeuwsen	Alpha Delta	Miss America 1973 winner; cohost of The 700 Club	

== Politics ==
Name	Chapter	Notability	Ref.
Patricia M. Clancy	Epsilon	Ohio Senate (2005–2007), Ohio House of Representatives (1997–2004)	
Kathryn E. Granahan	Honorary	Treasurer of the United States; United States House of Representatives	
Jane Margueretta Hoey	Honorary	Director of Public Assistance Bureau of the Social Security Board	
Mary Teresa Norton	Honorary	United States House of Representatives	
Andrea Seastrand	Alpha Gamma	United States House of Representatives	

== Sports ==
Name	Chapter	Notability	Ref.
Marge Schott	Epsilon	President and CEO of the Cincinnati Reds	
