= List of Theta Phi Alpha national conventions =

Theta Phi Alpha is a women's fraternity founded at the University of Michigan in 1912.This is a list of Theta Phi Alpha national conventions.

Convention number	Date	Location	Reference
1	September 1919	Detroit, Michigan	(Note: At this convention, it was agreed to propose a charter for national fraternity status.)
2	June 1920	Ann Arbor, Michigan	(Note: At this convention, the fraternity added the color blue, the pearl jewel, and the white rose as its national symbols. It also created the Grand Officer roles and determined the annual and charter dues.)
3	June 1921	Champaign, Illinois	(Note: At this convention, the fraternity approved three additional chapters, pledge pins, and the date of the Fraternity's Founder's Day. It also consolidated the Grand Council from ten to four positions.)
4	February 10, 1922 – February 11, 1922	Columbus, Ohio	(Note: At this convention, the fraternity developed its great seal to put on charter chapters and agreed to the installation of the Kappa chapter.)
5	August 1923	Athens, Ohio	
6	August 28, 1924	Cincinnati, Ohio	
7	June 29, 1925 – July 6, 1925	Lake Geneva, Wisconsin	
8	June 28, 1926 – July 2, 1926	St. Louis, Missouri	
9	August 28, 1928 – August 31, 1928	Estes Park, Colorado	
10	August 18, 1930 – August 21, 1930	Chicago, Illinois	
11	June 28, 1932 – July 2, 1932	Toronto, Ontario, Canada	
12	July 7, 1935 – July 11, 1935	Pittsburgh, Pennsylvania	
13	June 23, 1937 – July 3, 1937	Detroit, Michigan	
14	July 23, 1939 – July 27, 1939	Cincinnati, Ohio	
15	August 10, 1941 – August 14, 1941	State College, Pennsylvania	
16	September 3, 1946 – September 7, 1946	Swampscott, Massachusetts	
17	August 29, 1948 – September 1, 1948	Pittsburgh, Pennsylvania	
18	August 27, 1950 – August 31, 1950	Syracuse, New York	
19	June 29, 1952 – July 2, 1952	Chicago, Illinois	(Note: At this convention, the fraternity approved the merger with Pi Lambda Sigma)
20	June 27, 1954 – July 1, 1954	Cincinnati, Ohio	
21	June 22, 1956 – June 26, 1956	Burlington, Wisconsin	
22	June 13, 1958 – June 17, 1958	Port Huron, Michigan	
23	June 17, 1960 – June 21, 1960	Pittsburgh, Pennsylvania	
24	August 25, 1962 – August 30, 1962	Cleveland, Ohio	
25	June 17, 1964 – June 22, 1964	Detroit, Michigan	
26	June 30, 1966 – July 4, 1966	Chicago, Illinois	
27	June 27, 1968 – July 1, 1968	Cincinnati, Ohio	
28	June 1970	Lexington, Massachusetts	
29	June 1972	St. Louis, Missouri	
30	August 1974	Fort Mitchell, Kentucky	
31	August 1976	Akron, Ohio	
32	August 1978	Pittsburgh, Pennsylvania	
33	August 1980	Chicago, Illinois	
34	August 1982	New Orleans, Louisiana	
35	June 1984–July 1984	Fort Mitchell, Kentucky	
36	June 26, 1986 – June 29, 1986	Dearborn, Michigan	
37	June 1988	Chicago, Illinois	
38	June 1990	Orlando, Florida	
39	June 1992	Indianapolis, Indiana	
40	June 1994	Philadelphia, Pennsylvania	
41	June 1996	Buffalo, New York	
42	June 25, 1998 – June 28, 1998	Cleveland, Ohio	
43	June 22, 2000 – June 25, 2000	St. Louis, Missouri	
44	June 27, 2002 – June 30, 2002	Fort Lauderdale, Florida	
45	June 24, 2004 – June 27, 2004	Pittsburgh, Pennsylvania	
46	June 21, 2006 – June 25, 2006	Atlanta, Georgia	
47	July 9, 2008 – July 14, 2008	Lincolnshire, Illinois	
48	July 14, 2010 – July 17, 2010	Nashville, Tennessee	
49	July 10, 2012 – July 15, 2012	Ypsilanti, Michigan	(Note: This convention celebrated the fraternity's Centennial.)
50	July 8, 2014 – July 12, 2014	New Orleans, Louisiana	
51	July 13, 2016 – July 17, 2016	St. Louis, Missouri	
52	July 11, 2018 – July 15, 2018	Pittsburgh, Pennsylvania	
