= List of Theta Phi Alpha chapters =

Theta Phi Alpha is an American women's fraternity. It was established at the University of Michigan in 1912. The fraternity has collegiate and alumnae chapters.

== Collegiate chapters ==
Following are Theta Phi Alpha's collegiate chapters, with active chapters indicated in bold and inactive chapters in italics.

Chapter	Charter date and range	Institution	Location	Status	Ref.
Alpha	August 30, 1912 – 1936; 1941–1943, 1948	University of Michigan	Ann Arbor, Michigan	Inactive	(Note: Withdrawn by the University in 1936. Active again in 1941-1942 and 1942-1943, but Inactive again at the end of 1943 and lost its house. On rolls until 1948.)
Beta	May 17, 1919 – 1943; 1950–1952	University of Illinois	Urbana, Illinois	Inactive	(Note: Originated as the Catholic Girls Club, formed in 1918.)
Gamma	May 24, 1919 – 1940; 1953–1958	Ohio State University	Columbus, Ohio	Inactive	(Note: Originated within the Newman Club, formed 1917.)
Delta	June 7, 1919 – 1933; 1956–1971	Ohio University	Athens, Ohio	Inactive	(Note: Originated as the Girl's Newman Club. Reinstated in 1956 by absorption of Theta Gamma Phi (local), formed that same year.)
**Epsilon**	June 15, 1919	University of Cincinnati	Cincinnati, Ohio	Active	(Note: Originated within the Newman Club, formed 1917. Oldest continually active chapter. Absorbed Zeta chapter of Pi Lambda Sigma as part of the national merger.)
**Zeta**	May 29, 1920 – 1931; January 1949 – 1957; January 14, 2012	Indiana University	Bloomington, Indiana	Active	(Note: Originated from the co-ed Marquette Club.)
Eta	1921–1971	Boston University	Boston, Massachusetts	Inactive	(Note: Originated as Sigma Phi (local) in 1917, Absorbed Pi Lambda Sigma chapter in 1952 as part of the national merger.)
Theta	August 29, 1921 – 1927	University of Missouri	Columbia, Missouri	Inactive	(Note: Originated as Theta Mu (local) in 1920.)
Iota	August 12, 1921 – 1935; 1947–1955	University of Kansas	Lawrence, Kansas	Inactive	(Note: Formed from Delta Kappa (local), established 1920.)
**Kappa**	May 4, 1922	University of Pittsburgh	Pittsburgh, Pennsylvania	Active	(Note: Originated as Epsilon Pi Epsilon (local), formed in 1920.)
Lambda	December 2, 1923 – 1968	Syracuse University	Syracuse, New York	Inactive	(Note: Formed from Chi Sigma Theta (local), established in 1920.)
Mu	November 8, 1924 – 1939; September 23, 2011 –2017	University of Nebraska	Lincoln, Nebraska	Inactive	(Note: Originated in 1924 as Theta Phi (local) to petition Theta Phi Alpha for membership.)
Nu	February 13, 1926 – 1955	University of Wisconsin	Madison, Wisconsin	Inactive	(Note: Originated as Iota Chi Theta (local) before 1926.)
Xi	April 17, 1926 – 1939	University of Iowa	Iowa City, Iowa	Inactive	(Note: Organized as the Katho Club in October 1923.)
Omicron	November 14, 1926 – 1951	University of Denver	Denver, Colorado	Inactive	(Note: Organized as Beta Delta Sigma (local) in 1925.)
Pi	November 26, 1926 – 1954	University of California, Los Angeles	Los Angeles, California	Inactive	(Note: Formed from Rho Pi Mu (local), established in 1925.)
Rho	February 23, 1929 – 1969	Pennsylvania State University	University Park, Pennsylvania	Inactive	(Note: Formed from Omicron Eta (local), established in 1927.)
Sigma	February 14, 1931 – 1987	University of Akron	Akron, Ohio	Inactive	(Note: Formed from Chi Lambda Phi, established in 1928.)
Tau	December 6, 1941 – 1969	Marquette University	Milwaukee, Wisconsin	Inactive	(Note: While a probationary chapter, it used the name Phi Theta Alpha (local) as was the tradition of other probationary chapters at the time.)
Upsilon	March 7, 1943 – 1990	Loyola University	Chicago, Illinois	Inactive	(Note: Organized as Lambda Gamma Kappa (local) in 1938.)
Phi	February 11, 1951 – 1972	University of Detroit	Detroit, Michigan	Inactive	
**Chi**	September 13, 1952	Creighton University	Omaha, Nebraska	Active	(Note: Founded as Chi Mu Kappa (local) in 1928, became a chapter of Pi Lambda Sigma in 1946, and then Chi chapter with the national merger.)
Psi	May 19, 1954 – 1960	Quincy University	Quincy, Illinois	Inactive	(Note: Founded as a chapter of Pi Lambda Sigma in 1944, becoming Psi chapter with the national merger.)
Omega	April 17, 1955 – 1971	Saint Louis University	St. Louis, Missouri	Inactive	(Note: Formed from Omega Club, established on October 26, 1954)
Alpha Alpha	February 26, 1956 – 1970	The Catholic University of America	Washington, D.C.	Inactive	(Note: Organized as Triamond Club in 1949 or 1954.)
**Alpha Beta**	November 28, 1959	Loyola University	New Orleans, Louisiana	Active	(Note: Originated as Phi Theta Alpha (local), formed in 1958.)
Alpha Gamma	April 30, 1960 – 1994	DePaul University	Chicago, Illinois	Inactive	(Note: Originated as Theta Pi (local). Throughout most of the chapter's existence, rushees put in bids on the sorority rather than the normal opposite.)
**Alpha Delta**	May 1, 1960 – 1970; May 18, 2013	St. Norbert College	De Pere, Wisconsin	Active	(Note: Originated as Phi Theta Alpha (local) in 1959. The chapter reverted to local status in 1970. Reinstated as ΘΦΑ on May 18, 2013)
**Alpha Epsilon**	November 25, 1960	St. John's University	Jamaica, New York	Active	(Note: Founded as Omega Rho (local) in 1959, became the first national sorority on campus.)
Alpha Zeta	May 23, 1963 – 1973; 1980 – February 5, 2015	Franciscan University of Steubenville	Steubenville, Ohio	Inactive	(Note: Founded in 1957 as Kappa Psi Mu sister organization to Alpha Phi Delta on campus. Suspended February 5, 2015.)
Alpha Eta	June 26, 1968 – 1974; February 9, 2008 – August 23, 2017	Thomas More College	Crestview Hills, Kentucky	Inactive	(Note: Chapter was suspended August 23, 2017.)
Alpha Theta	October 26, 1968 – 1973	University of Wisconsin at Stevens Point	Stevens Point, Wisconsin	Inactive	(Note: Founded as Psi Delta Psi in 1959.)
Alpha Iota	April 26, 1970 – 2001	Purdue University Calumet	Hammond, Indiana	Inactive	(Note: Founded as Pi Delta Phi in 1968.)
Alpha Kappa colony	N/A	Saint Peter's University	Jersey City, New Jersey	Inactive	(Note: In 1968, Theta Mu (local), a group formed earlier that same year, petitioned for membership and became a probationary chapter in 1970, but reconsidered and was never installed. To clarify naming confusion, the Alpha Lambda chapter had already been installed by this time.)
Alpha Lambda	March 21, 1971 – 1971	Gannon University	Erie, Pennsylvania	Inactive	(Note: Founded as Chi Delphia (local) in 1969.)
**Alpha Mu**	August 15, 1974	Northern Kentucky University	Highland Heights, Kentucky	Active	
Alpha Nu	November 10, 1973 – 2002	Kettering University	Flint, Michigan	Inactive	(Note: Chapter consists of two sections, reflecting the split of the student body.)
**Alpha Xi**	January 6, 1979	Cleveland State University	Cleveland, Ohio	Active	
Alpha Omicron	October 15, 1983 – 1992	Xavier University	Cincinnati Ohio	Inactive	
**Alpha Pi**	February 2, 1985	Wayne State College	Wayne, Nebraska	Active	
Alpha Rho	February 9, 1985 – 1993	Robert Morris University	Moon Township, Pennsylvania	Inactive	(Note: Founded as Gamma Gamma Gamma (local) in 1964 chapter.)
Alpha Sigma	November 16, 1985 – 2004	California University of Pennsylvania	California, Pennsylvania	Inactive	(Note: This chapter had its origin in Gamma Psi (local), a group formed in 1983 from the closed Alpha Xi Delta chapter.)
**Alpha Tau**	January 11, 1986	Embry–Riddle Aeronautical University	Daytona Beach, Florida	Active	
**Alpha Upsilon**	March 1, 1986	Indiana University of Pennsylvania	Indiana, Pennsylvania	Active	
Alpha Phi	March 15, 1986 – 199x ?	Saint Mary's University	Winona, Minnesota	Inactive	
Alpha Chi	May 10, 1986 – 2009	Monmouth University	West Long Branch, New Jersey	Inactive	(Note: Founded as a little sister organization to Tau Kappa Epsilon chapter in 1977. Placed on probation by Theta Phi Alpha in 2007.)
**Alpha Psi**	January 17, 1987	University of Dayton	Dayton, Ohio	Active	
**Alpha Omega**	May 1, 1987 – 2006; February 15, 2014	University of Wisconsin-Platteville	Platteville, Wisconsin	Active	(Note: Founded from Delta Gamma Phi (local), established in 1966.)
**Beta Alpha**	September 13, 1987	Stony Brook University	Stony Brook, New York	Active	
**Beta Beta**	February 27, 1988	The College of New Jersey	Trenton, New Jersey	Active	
**Beta Gamma**	February 28, 1988	Fairleigh Dickinson University	Madison, New Jersey	Active	
**Beta Delta**	December 3, 1988	Muskingum University	New Concord, Ohio	Active	
**Beta Epsilon**	February 3, 1990	Southeastern Louisiana University	Hammond, Louisiana	Active	(Note: Founded as Sigma Theta Rho in 1986.)
Beta Zeta	March 31, 1990 – 200x ?	New York Institute of Technology	Central Islip, New York	Inactive	
Beta Eta	May 12, 1990 – 2001	Bryant University	Smithfield, Rhode Island	Inactive	(Note: Founded when Sigma Lambda Theta (local) was forced to go national by the university administration.)
**Beta Theta**	May 5, 1990 – 2004; April 2010	St. Francis University	Loretto, Pennsylvania	Active	(Note: Group founded by a combination of Psi Lambda Psi and the little sister group of Phi Kappa Theta. Closed for hazing in 2004. Reinstated April 2010.)
Beta Iota	August 4, 1990 – 2007	Fairleigh Dickinson University	Teaneck, New Jersey	Inactive	(Note: Founded as Alpha Tau Theta.)
Beta Kappa	November 17, 1990 – 201x ?	Clarion University of Pennsylvania	Clarion, Pennsylvania	Inactive	(Note: Founded as Lambda Zeta Tau in 1988.)
**Beta Lambda**	April 13, 1991 – 1999; May 1, 2009	University of Michigan–Flint	Flint, Michigan	Active	
Beta Mu	May 5, 1991 – 2008	Bridgewater State University	Bridgewater, Massachusetts	Inactive	(Note: Founded as Delta Psi Rho (local) in 1987.)
**Beta Nu**	November 23, 1991	Florida Atlantic University	Boca Raton, Florida	Active	(Note: Founded as Nu Gamma Phi.)
**Beta Xi**	April 11, 1992	William Paterson University	Wayne, New Jersey	Active	(Note: Originated from Sigma Sigma (local) and Nu Theta Chi.)
Beta Omicron	May 3, 1992 – 200x ?	SUNY Brockport	Brockport, New York	Inactive	
Beta Pi	December 1992 – 200x ?	SUNY Albany	Albany, New York	Inactive	
Beta Rho	February 1993 – c. 2008	Goldey–Beacom College	Wilmington, Delaware	Inactive	(Note: Delaware Alumnae association was formed in 2008 due in part to the closure of Beta Rho)
**Beta Sigma**	February 20, 1993	Ramapo College	Mahwah, New Jersey	Active	(Note: Founded as Kappa Gamma (local) in 1989.)
Beta Tau	March 27, 1993 – 200x ?	Johnson & Wales University	Providence, Rhode Island	Inactive	(Note: Founded as Kappa Sigma Tau (local) before 1993.)
**Beta Upsilon**	April 17, 1993 – 1995; April 9, 2005	Saint Leo University	St. Leo, Florida	Active	(Note: Founded as Psi Theta Epsilon (local) in 1975. The chapter disaffiliated by returning its charter to the national fraternity in 1995 and operated as a local group. Its charter was reinstated on April 9, 2005.)
Beta Phi	May 8, 1993 – 2003	Millersville University	Millersville, Pennsylvania	Inactive	(Note: Founded as Alpha Lambda Sigma (local) in 1990.)
**Beta Chi**	May 15, 1993	Missouri Valley College	Marshall, Missouri	Active	(Note: Founded as Chi Zeta (local) in 1990.)
**Beta Psi**	September 18, 1993	Merrimack College	Andover, Massachusetts	Active	(Note: Founded as Pi Theta Epsilon (local) in 1984.)
**Beta Omega**	April 23, 1994	Kean University	Union, New Jersey	Active	(Note: Delta Sigma Pi, Alpha Theta Pi, and Zeta Delta Pi came together to become Pi Pi Pi in 1992 which then colonized Theta Phi Alpha.)
**Gamma Alpha**	December 3, 1994	Penn State Erie, The Behrend College	Erie, Pennsylvania	Active	(Note: Founded as Behrend Sorority Interest Group.)
Gamma Beta	April 26, 1997 – July 5, 2018	Marian University	Fond du Lac, Wisconsin	Inactive	(Note: Founded as Sigma Omega Sigma.) (Note: Suspended on July 5, 2018.)
**Gamma Gamma**	May 2, 1998	Kutztown University	Kutztown, Pennsylvania	Active	(Note: Founded as Omicron Omicron Omicron in 1990–91)
**Gamma Delta**	December 14, 2002	Rowan University	Glassboro, New Jersey	Active	(Note: Founded as Alpha Delta Epsilon.)
**Gamma Epsilon**	May 11, 2003	Shawnee State University	Portsmouth, Ohio	Active	(Note: Founded as Beta chapter of Delta Sigma Tau in 1994. Centennial book says the chartered dated was May 17, 2003, rather than May 11 listed in other sources.)
**Gamma Zeta**	June 14, 2003	Texas A&M University–Kingsville	Kingsville, Texas	Active	(Note: Founded as Zeta Phi Omega c. 1991.)
Gamma Eta	November 15, 2003 – 2024	Pratt Institute	Brooklyn, New York	Inactive	
Gamma Theta	May 6, 2005 – March 26, 2012	Shippensburg University	Shippensburg, Pennsylvania	Inactive	
Gamma Iota	November 12, 2005 – October 26, 2011	Davis & Elkins College	Elkins, West Virginia	Inactive	
Gamma Kappa	January 20, 2006 – 2022	Wright State University	Dayton, Ohio	Inactive	(Note: Chapter closed when "challenges in achieving continued successful membership recruitment results have hindered the ability of the chapter to provide the enriching membership experience that our legacy dictates.")
**Gamma Lambda**	April 29, 2006	Suffolk University	Boston, Massachusetts	Active	(Note: Group originally formed as Suffolk Sorority.) (Note: Centennial says the date of the charter was April 26 instead of April 29, 2006.)
Gamma Mu	May 20, 2006 – December 19, 2025	Clarkson University	Potsdam, New York	Inactive	(Note: Originally Chi Delta Sigma.)
**Gamma Nu**	November 10, 2007	Rockhurst University	Kansas City, Missouri	Active	
Gamma Xi	March 29, 2008 – March 22, 2019	University of Virginia's College at Wise	Wise, Virginia	Inactive	(Note: Originally Alpha Delta Chi.)
**Gamma Omicron**	April 12, 2008	Utica College	Utica, New York	Active	
Gamma Pi	March 28, 2009 – 2024	St. John's University	Staten Island, New York	Inactive	(Note: Formed as Girls' Interest Group.)
Gamma Rho	April 4, 2009 – May 17, 2021	Sacred Heart University	Fairfield, Connecticut	Inactive	(Note: Originated as Zeta Iota Lambda (local) in 2003.) (Note: Indefinitely suspended May 17, 2021.)
Gamma Sigma	May 2, 2009 – March 20, 2015	York College of Pennsylvania	York, Pennsylvania	Inactive	(Note: Founded in 1989 as Omega Chi (local).) (Note: Suspended for hazing March 20, 2015.)
Gamma Tau	July 25, 2009 – January 27, 2013	Clayton State University	Marrow, Georgia	Inactive	(Note: Suspended January 27, 2013.)
Gamma Upsilon	January 15, 2011 – May 2013	Wesley College	Dover, Delaware	Inactive	(Note: Suspended May 2013.)
Gamma Phi	December 3, 2011 – November 19, 2021	Indiana University South Bend	South Bend, Indiana	Inactive	(Note: Suspended November 19, 2021.)
**Gamma Chi**	April 15, 2012	Stevens Institute of Technology	Hoboken, New Jersey	Active	(Note: Founded as Omicron Pi (local) in 1987.)
**Gamma Psi**	November 4, 2012	Philadelphia University	Philadelphia, Pennsylvania	Active	
**Gamma Omega**	December 15, 2012	Trine University	Angola, Indiana	Active	(Note: Founded as Zeta Theta Epsilon (local) in 1998.)
**Delta Alpha**	May 4, 2013	State University of New York at Plattsburgh	Plattsburgh, New York	Active	
**Delta Beta**	May 18, 2013	St. Joseph's College	Patchogue, New York	Active	(Note: Originated as Zeta Sigma Phi (local), formed in 2002.)
Delta Gamma	November 16, 2013 – 2024	Lynn University	Boca Raton, Florida	Inactive	
**Delta Delta**	January 18, 2014	Ashland University	Ashland, Ohio	Active	
**Delta Epsilon**	May 3, 2014	Rhode Island College	Providence, Rhode Island	Active	
Delta Zeta	June 14, 2014 – 2022	St. Cloud State University	St. Cloud, Minnesota	Inactive	
**Delta Eta**	February 13, 2016	Salem State University	Salem, Massachusetts	Active	
**Delta Theta**	September 10, 2016	Hartwick College	Oneonta, New York	Active	
Delta Iota	June 16, 2017 – August 26, 2019	New Jersey City University	Jersey City, New Jersey	Inactive	(Note: Indefinitely suspended August 26, 2019, after "challenges in achieving continued successful membership recruitment results.")
**Delta Kappa**	December 2, 2017	Hobart and William Smith Colleges	Geneva, New York	Active	
**Delta Lambda**	April 29, 2018	Montclair State University	Montclair, New Jersey	Active	
Delta Mu	December 2, 2018 – 2024	Marian University	Indianapolis, Indiana	Inactive	
Delta Nu	December 14, 2019 – 2024	Benedictine University	Lisle, Illinois	Inactive	
**Delta Xi**	November 15, 2020	Mount St. Joseph University	Cincinnati, Ohio	Active	
**Delta Omicron**	January 24, 2021	Southern New Hampshire University	Manchester, New Hampshire	Active	

== Alumnae chapters ==
The Alumnae Chapters of Theta Phi Alpha are listed below.

Chapter	State	Type	Status	Ref.
Akron Area	Ohio	Association	Active	
Appalachian	Virginia/Tennessee	Association	Inactive	
Atlanta Area	Georgia	Association	Inactive	
Boston Area	Massachusetts	Association	Active	
Central Florida Area	Florida	Association	Active	
Central Minnesota	Minnesota	Association	Active	
Central Ohio	Ohio	Association	Active	
Chicago Area	Illinois	Association	Active	
Colorado	Colorado	Club	Inactive	
Dallas/Fort Worth Area	Texas	Association	Active	
Delaware	Delaware	Association	Inactive	
Flint Area	Michigan	Association	Active	
Greater Cincinnati	Ohio	Association	Active	
Greater Cleveland	Ohio	Association	Active	
Greater Dayton	Ohio	Association	Active	
Greater Louisville	Kentucky	Club	Active	
Greater Omaha Area	Nebraska	Association	Active	
Greater St. Louis Area	Missouri	Club	Active	
Greater Tampa Area	Florida	Association	Active	
Houston Area	Texas	Association	Active	
Kansas City Area	Missouri	Association	Active	
Lincoln Area	Nebraska	Association	Active	
Long Island	New York	Association	Active	
Madison Area	Wisconsin	Association	Active	
Nation's Capital Area	Washington D.C	Association	Active	
New Orleans Area	Louisiana	Association	Active	
New York City	New York	Association	Active	
Northeast Florida	Florida	Club	Active	
Northeastern Nebraska	Nebraska	Association	Active	
Northern and Central New York	New York	Association	Active	
Northern Indiana/Illinois	Illinois/Indiana	Association	Active	
Northern Kentucky (via Instagram)	Kentucky	Association	Active	
Northern New Jersey	New Jersey	Association	Active	
Northshore Louisiana Area	Louisiana	Association	Active	
Ohio River Valley	Ohio	Association	Active	
Pennsylvania Laurel Highlands	Pennsylvania	Association	Inactive	
Philadelphia Area	Pennsylvania	Association	Active	
Pittsburgh	Pennsylvania	Association	Active	
South Bend Area	Indiana	Association	Active	
South Florida	Florida	Association	Active	
South Texas	Texas	Association	Active	
Southeastern Wisconsin	Wisconsin	Association	Active	
Southern California	California	Association	Active	
Southern Connecticut	Connecticut	Association	Active	
Valley of the Sun	Arizona	Club	Active	
Western Michigan	Michigan	Club	Active	
