= Kappa Delta =

North American collegiate sorority

- ΚΔ
- Founded: October 23, 1897; 129 years ago State Female Normal School (now Longwood University)
- Type: Social
- Affiliation: NPC
- Status: Active
- Scope: National
- Motto: Τὰ καλὰ διώκωμεν "Let us strive for that which is honorable, beautiful and highest"
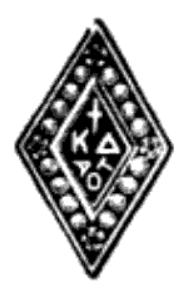
- Member badge
- Colors: Olive green Pearl white
- Symbol: Nautilus shell
- Flower: White rose
- Jewel: Diamond; Emerald; Pearl
- Mascot: Teddy bear Katydid
- Publication: The Angelos
- Philanthropy: Girl Scouts of the USA; Prevent Child Abuse of America (PCAA)
- Chapters: 167 active collegiate 150+ alumnae chapters
- Members: 309,000+ lifetime
- Headquarters: 3205 Players Lane; Memphis, Tennessee 38125; United States
- Website: www.kappadelta.org

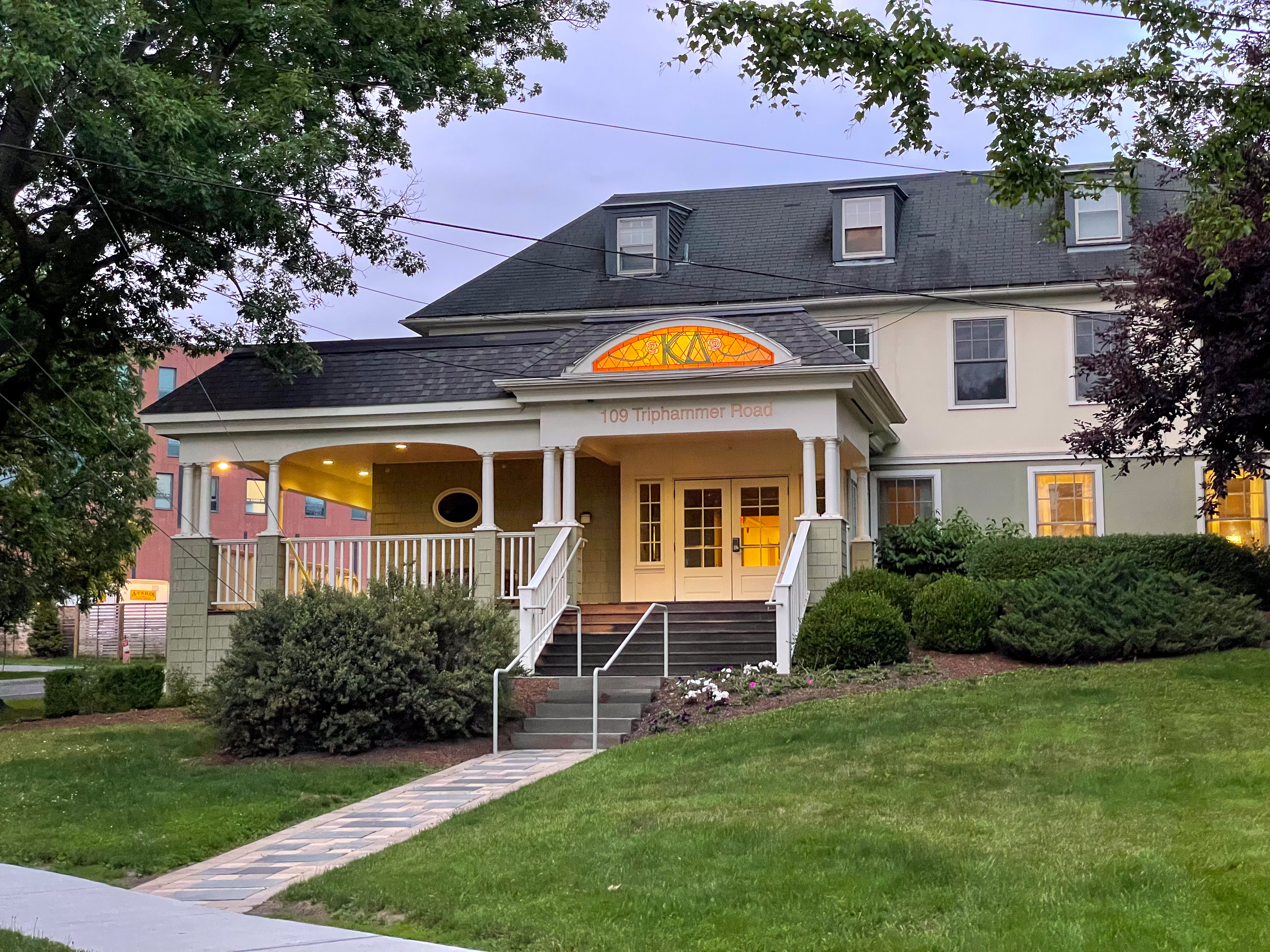
Kappa Delta house at Cornell University

Kappa Delta (ΚΔ, also known as KD or Kaydee) is an American collegiate social sorority. Established in 1897, it was the first sorority founded at the State Female Normal School (now Longwood University), in Farmville, Virginia. Kappa Delta is one of the "Farmville Four", four now national sororities that were established at the university. It is a member of the National Panhellenic Conference.

== History ==
Kappa Delta was founded on October 23, 1897, at the State Female Normal School (now Longwood University), in Farmville, Virginia. The founders were college students Lenora Ashmore Blackiston, Mary Sommerville Sparks Hendrick, Julia Gardiner Tyler Wilson, and Sara Turner White.

Blackiston first suggested forming a sorority. She went on to attend Randolph-Macon Woman's College. At 23 years of age Hendrick was the oldest founder and stayed at State Normal until 1902, longer than any of the other founders. Wilson was the chief illustrator of the school's yearbook and designed the Kappa Delta badge. White would frequently host Founders Day festivities at her home later in life.

The sorority expanded in 1902, chartering chapters at Chatham Episcopal Institute (now Chatham Hall), Hollins College, and Gunston Hall School. It joined the National Panhellenic Conference in 1912; however, three of its first four chapters were closed at the time because they were not at colleges.

By 1907, Kappa Delta had initiated 350 members at ten chapters. In 1917, the sorority established a Student Loan Fund to help members complete college. In 1921, the sorority selected the Crippled Children's Hospital in Richmond, Virginia as its philanthropy. It created an endowment in 1923.

By 1927, the sorority had chartered 68 chapters and had initiated 6,758 members. Sixteen chapters owned houses. It also had 48 alumnae associations.

As of 2024, Kappa Delta has initiated more than 309,000 members. It is headquartered in Memphis, Tennessee. Kappa Delta is one of the "Farmville Four", four now national sororities that were established at the university.

== Symbols ==
Kappa Delta's motto is Τὰ καλὰ διώκωμεν or "Let us strive for that which is honorable, beautiful and highest".

Kappa Delta's coat of arms (often called the crest) is a white Norman shield, surmounted by a lamp of ancient design, against a background of ornamental scroll. A ribbon underneath the shield bears the date of the sorority's founding. Kappa Delta's tagline is "Building Confidence. Inspiring Action." Its insignia is a skull, cross bones, skeleton, dagger, and snake.

The Kappa Delta badge is diamond-shaped with a dagger symbol and the Greek letters "ΚΔ" and "ΑΟΤ" in gold on a black enamel background. The sorority's new member pin is a white enamel Norman shield bearing a green enamel triangle that contains three stars.

The sorority's symbol is the nautilus shell which symbolizes growth, renewal, and expansion. Its mascots are the teddy bear and the katydid. Its colors are olive green and pearl white. Its flower is the white rose. It has three official jewels: the diamond, the emerald, and the pearl. Its flag is a pennant shaped, in white with the Greek letters "ΚΔ" in olive green.

Its publication is The Angelos was started in 1904.

== Philanthropies ==
Kappa Delta Sorority's official philanthropies are the Girl Scouts of the USA and Prevent Child Abuse America. Kappa Delta national continues to support is historical philanthropies are the Children's Hospital of Richmond at VCU and Orthopedic Research Awards. Sorority members also host Shamrock events every year to raise money for Prevent Child Abuse America and local child abuse prevention efforts. To date, Kappa Delta has donated more than $23 million to prevent child abuse in the United States.

== Chapters ==
Kappa Delta has 167 active collegiate chapters in North America. It also has more than 150 alumnae chapters around the world.

== Local chapter or member misconduct ==
In 2022, Betty Jane Cadle, former treasurer of the sorority chapter at Mississippi State University, was convicted of stealing $2.9 million from the sorority. As a result of Cadle's wrongdoing, the sorority chapter struggled financially. According to court documents, Cadle began to intentionally divert funds from the sorority's bank accounts in 2012. She used handwritten checks to transfer large sums of money into her personal bank account and the account of Belles and Beaus, a downtown Oxford children's clothing store owned by Cadle and her daughter, Cathy Lowe. Prosecutors say the fraud continued until late 2019. Cadle will serve four years in prison and was ordered to pay $2.9 million in restitution to the sorority chapter.

In 2013 and 2014, sorority women from multiple sorority chapters at the University of Alabama – including Kappa Delta, Alpha Gamma Delta, Alpha Omicron Pi, Phi Mu, Alpha Chi Omega, Pi Beta Phi, Delta Delta Delta, Kappa Kappa Gamma, and Chi Omega – alleged that either active members or some alumnae had prevented them from offering membership to black candidates because of their race. Students, including Kappa Delta members, held a campus march to integrate Greek life on campus, and following media and national outcry, the university held a second round of recruitment in hopes of offering membership to more women.

== Notable members ==
Following are some of the notable members of Kappa Delta.

| Name | Chapter | Notability | Industry | Ref. |
|---|---|---|---|---|
| Laine Alden Mansour Brooke Anderson | Alpha Mu Ole Miss Sigma Phi (University of Georgia) | 2018 Miss Mississippi USA Actress & Model Emmy and Peabody award-winning television host for Entertainment Tonight | Entertainment | |
| Amy Coney Barrett | Alpha Delta (Rhodes College) | Justice of the Supreme Court of the United States | Law | |
| Kathleen Babineaux Blanco | Gamma Kappa (University of Louisiana - Lafayette) | Governor of Louisiana | Politics | |
| Pearl S. Buck | Theta (Randolph College) | First American woman to win the Nobel Prize in literature and Pulitzer Prize winner | Literature | |
| Jean Carpenter Carnahan | Epsilon Alpha (Missouri University of Science and Technology) | United States Senate | Politics | |
| Addie Carver | Delta Omega (Mississippi State University) | Miss Teen USA 2024 | Entertainment | |
| Susie Castillo | Alpha Iota (University of California, Los Angeles) | Miss USA 2003 | Arts and Entertainment | |
| Liz Cochran | Alpha Upsilon (Birmingham Southern College) | Miss Alabama 2009 | Entertainment | |
| Ruth Johnson Colvin | Lambda (Northwestern University) | Founder of ProLiteracy Worldwide and recipient of the Presidential Medal of Freedom | Philanthropy and Service | |
| Emily Elizabeth Douglas | Gamma Nu (Miami University of Ohio) | Founder and executive director of Grandma's Gifts | Philanthropy and Service | |
| Ellen Albertini Dow | Omega Chi (Cornell) | Actress known for The Wedding Singer and Wedding Crashers | Entertainment | |
| Bonnie Dunbar | Sigma Iota (University of Washington) | NASA astronaut | Science | |
| Taylor DuPriest | Delta Lambda (Georgia Southern University) | Television personality known for Kid Nation | Arts and Entertainment | |
| Lauren Elaine | Sigma Epsilon (University of Texas) | Celebrity fashion designer, actress, and television personality | Entertainment | |
| Christine Blasey Ford | Beta Chi (University of North Carolina at Chapel Hill) | Psychology professor at Palo Alto University and a research psychologist at the Stanford University School of Medicine | Academia | |
| Christine O' Grady Gregoire | Sigma Iota (University of Washington) | Governor of Washington | Politics | |
| Claudia J. Kennedy | Alpha Delta (Rhodes College) | U.S. Army's first female three-star general | Military | |
| Suzanne Lambert | Sigma Phi (University of Georgia) | Comedian, political commentator, social media content creator | Entertainment, Politics | |
| Ali Landry | Gamma Kappa (University of Louisiana - Lafayette) | Actress and Miss USA 1996 | Entertainment | |
| Jennifer Lee | Alpha Sigma (University of New Hampshire) | Writer and director of the 2013 Disney animated feature Frozen | Entertainment | |
| Lane Lindell | Sigma Phi (University of Georgia) | Model and Miss United States World 2008 | Entertainment | |
| Sam Macuga | Eta Xi (Dartmouth College) | Ski jumper | Sports | |
| Patricia Polito Miller | Sigma Upsilon (Indiana University) | Co-owner and president of Vera Bradley | Business | |
| Megan Moroney | Sigma Phi (University of Georgia) | Singer/songwriter | Entertainment | |
| Cara Mund | Theta Gamma (Brown University) | Miss North Dakota 2017 and Miss America 2018 | Entertainment | |
| Wendi Nix | Epsilon Sigma (Wofford College) | ESPN commentator | Entertainment | |
| Joan Lowery Nixon | Theta Sigma (University of Southern California) | Author | Literature | |
| Georgia O'Keeffe | Beta (Chatham Episcopal) | Artist and Presidential Medal of Freedom recipient | Art | |
| Lisa Patton | Zeta (University of Alabama) | Author known for the book Rush | Literature | |
| Shelley Regner | Epsilon (Louisiana State University) | Actress known for the Pitch Perfect | Entertainment | |
| Hannah Roberts | Beta Sigma (University of Southern Mississippi) | Miss Mississippi 2015 | Entertainment | |
| Margaret Holland Sargent | Alpha Iota (University of California, Los Angeles) | Portrait artist who painted Tennessee Williams, Gerald Ford, Jimmy Carter, and Margaret Thatcher | Art | |
| Camille Schrier | Epsilon Pi (Virginia Polytechnic Institute and State University) | Miss America 2020 | Entertainment | |
| Jacki Sorensen | Phi (University of California, Berkeley) | Originator of aerobics dance-exercise regimen | Sports | |
| Suzy Spafford | Beta Rho (San Diego State University) | Cartoonist and creator of the Suzy's Zoo greeting cards | Business | |
| Lara Spencer | Beta Theta (Pennsylvania State University) | Co-anchor for Good Morning America and correspondent for Nightline and ABC News | Entertainment | |
| Musette Dunn Steck | Sigma Delta (Duke University) | Politician, activist, historian, and educator | Politics | |
| Donna J. Stone | Lambda (Northwestern University) | Founder of Prevent Child Abuse America | Philanthropy and Service | |
| Leigh Anne Tuohy | Alpha Mu (University of Mississippi) | Interior designer and legal guardian of Michael Oher, as featured in the 2009 film The Blind Side | Business | |
| Mari Wilensky | Beta Pi (University of Florida) | Miss Florida 2005 | Entertainment | |
| Debbie Maffett Wilson | Gamma Rho (Sam Houston State) | Miss America 1983 | Entertainment | |
| Caitlin Upton | Epsilon Epsilon (Appalachian State University) | Miss Teen South Carolina USA 2007 | Entertainment | a |
| Trischa Zorn | Pi (University of Nebraska) | Paralympian | Sports | |

== See also ==
- List of social sororities and women's fraternities
