= John O'Grady (priest) =

American priest and academic

John O'Grady (March 31, 1886 – January 2, 1966) was a sociologist, economist, social reformer. O’Grady served as executive secretary of the National Conference of Catholic Charities (now Catholic Charities USA) from 1920 to 1961.

== Life ==
John O'Grady, the son of Francis O'Grady and Margaret (Hayes) O'Grady, was born on March 31, 1886, in Annagh Feakle, County Clare, Ireland. He was educated in Ireland and attended seminary at the All Hallows College in Dublin, where he was ordained on June 24, 1909. After ordination, O'Grady was assigned to serve in the diocese of Omaha, Nebraska.

In 1912, O'Grady was sent to Catholic University of America to pursue a graduate degree. He completed a doctorate in sociology and economics in 1915, with a dissertation called "The Legal Minimum Wage." During his study, O'Grady also took summer courses at Johns Hopkins University and Chicago University. In Chicago, O'Grady became fascinated by Jane Addams and the settlement movement. He later wrote that “I came to regard Jane Adams [sic] as one of the great leaders of American life.”

== Work ==
=== Academics ===
O'Grady became a professor of economics at Catholic University of America in 1915 and taught at the school for several decades in the sociology and economics departments. He also taught sociology at Trinity College in Washington, D.C. (now called Trinity Washington University).

In 1934, O’Grady helped to found Catholic University’s School of Social Work and served as its dean from 1934 to 1938.

=== The National Conference of Catholic Charities ===
While at Catholic University, O'Grady was mentored by Monsignor William J. Kerby, who was a professor and a founder of the recently formed National Conference of Catholic Charities (NCCC), later called Catholic Charities USA. Kerby encouraged O'Grady to become involved in the work of the NCCC. In 1920, O'Grady was elected to be Kerby's successor as executive secretary of the NCCC, a position he would hold until 1961.

As secretary of the NCCC, O’Grady worked to professionalize Catholic social services and staff by developing and training diocesan organizations, improving communication across agencies, and training workers.

O’Grady also advocated for social justice measures and lobbied for “widespread social reform based on Catholic principles,” on a wide variety of issues, including: support of New Deal relief measures, the Social Security Act, housing legislation, measures for displaced persons following World War II, and immigration reform.

In addition, O’Grady served as managing-editor and eventually editor at The Catholic Charities Review. At the Review, O’Grady worked alongside John A. Ryan, who served as editor-in-chief and eventually contributing editor. The Review, itself the successor to the St. Vincent’s Quarterly, was the “clearinghouse of material and information related to the work of Catholic Charities.” The publication ceased production in 1975 and was succeeded by Catholic Charities USA’s publication Charities. As managing editor and editor, O’Grady authored editorials in the monthly publication that took positions on everything from unemployment relief efforts in the Great Depression to social work practices.

=== Advocacy ===
O’Grady served as an advocate for many social reform measures, working behind the scenes with congressmen and testifying before Congress on issues such as: unemployment relief, immigration, migrant labor, and public housing measures. Over the years, O’Grady developed strong relationships behind the scenes, becoming a resource for legislators such as Senator Robert F. Wagner (D-NY) and administrators such as Harry Hopkins and Aubrey Willis Williams.

In 1919, O'Grady was appointed as secretary of the Committee of Reconstruction and After War Activities of the National Catholic War Council (later the National Catholic Welfare Council). It was in this position that O'Grady persuaded John A. Ryan to write the Bishop's Program on Social Reconstruction.

In 1931, O’Grady helped create the first National Public Housing Conference. He served as chairman of the Housing Legislative Information Service, “a group which brings together representatives of all organizations in the United States interested in housing,” from 1945 to 1961.

O’Grady was vocally opposed to restrictive immigration reform laws that were proposed in the wake of World War II. In 1952, O’Grady was named as a member of the President’s Commission on Immigration and Naturalization by President Harry S. Truman. During that time, O’Grady was outspoken in his opposition to the McCaran-Walter Act. He was particularly critical of the bill’s inclusion of a literacy test and the continuation of the national quota system that favored immigrants from Western European nations, which O’Grady believed was prejudiced and would perpetuate “the doctrine of Nordic superiority.” O’Grady said that America “can't discriminate against two-thirds of the world and still presume to be the leader of the Western democracies.”

O’Grady befriended Saul Alinsky, the pioneer of community organizing, in the 1940s. In 1952, Alinsky contracted with a publisher to write a biography of O’Grady’s life. Though the manuscript was drafted, it was never published.

O’Grady helped to found Caritas Internationalis in 1951 and served as its first vice president from 1958 to 1961.

In 1959, O’Grady was cited in a letter by Pope John XXIII for his “wise and zealous” direction of Caritas in Ghana and for his work “to foster a spirit of neighborliness and to promote the real welfare of the people.”

== Works ==
A Legal Minimum Wage. Washington: National Capital Press, 1915.

Directory of Catholic Charities in the United States. (Editor). Washington: National Conference of Catholic Charities, Catholic University, 1922.

An Introduction to Social Work. The Century Co, 1928.

The Catholic Church and the Destitute. The Macmillan, 1929.

Catholic Charities in the United States: History and Problems. Literary Licensing LLC, 1931.

Levi Silliman Ives: Pioneer Leader in Catholic Charities. (1933)

== Death ==
O’Grady died from a kidney ailment on January 2, 1966, at Carroll Manor, a retirement home for clergy in Hyattsville, Maryland. Archbishop Patrick O’Boyle celebrated a pontifical mass in O’Grady’s honor on January 5, 1966, at St. Mathew’s Cathedral in Washington well, DC. Archbishop Boyle said in a tribute to O’Grady that “his influence on charitable work of the Church in this country and throughout the world for widespread social reform will long be remembered. He was truly a modern apostle of Christian charity.” O’Grady was buried at Mt. Olivet Cemetery.

There were several remembrances of O’Grady following his death, including a speech by then-Speaker of the United States House of Representatives, John William McCormack, who said: “We may well mourn that such a man has left us, but the occasion of his death is truly, in the long view, the occasion for rejoicing, both in the splendor of his Christian soul, and in the lasting benefits which his career has brought to our Nation [sic] and to the world. May his soul rest in peace and may his example inspire generations yet to come.”
