= Jane Margueretta Hoey =

American civil servant (1892–1968)

- Hoey in 1936
- Born: January 15, 1892; Greeley County, Nebraska
- Died: October 6, 1968 (aged 76); New York, New York
- Education: Trinity College (BA); Columbia University (AM)
- Occupation: Social worker
- Years active: 1916–1953
- Organization: Social Security Administration
- Relatives: James P. Hoey

Jane Margueretta Hoey (January 15, 1892 – October 6, 1968) was an American social worker and welfare administrator who served within the Social Security Administration of the U.S. federal government. Born in Nebraska and raised in New York, Hoey developed an inclination towards social work from her mother Catherine, and studied under a variety of Catholic social workers. She was sought out for a position within Social Security in 1936, where her first boss, Harry Hopkins, also worked, and she served as the director of the Bureau of Public Assistance for nearly 20 years. In 1953, the Eisenhower administration abruptly fired Hoey as an effort to replace career civil service appointments with political appointees. She continued to work and write on social work until her death in 1968.

== Early life and education ==
Hoey was born in Greeley County, Nebraska on January 15, 1892, the youngest of nine children born to Irish immigrants John and Catherine Noey. The Noeys had immigrated to New York City shortly after the American Civil War, but had settled in Nebraska so that John could begin life as a rancher. When this career path proved unsuccessful, Hoey and the family returned to New York in 1898. Hoey's older siblings found steady work, and used their economic earnings to fund their younger sister's education and travels. Hoey's mother, meanwhile, "had a deep concern for people, especially those in trouble", and introduced Hoey to the residents of Welfare Island.

After graduating from Wadleigh High School for Girls in 1910, Hoey attended Hunter College for two years before transferring to Trinity College in Washington, D.C. She received her B.A. from Trinity in 1914, and returned to New York to earn a master's degree from Columbia University, as well as a diploma from the New York School of Philosophy, in 1916. Hoey's instructors at Trinity included William J. Kerby, John A. Ryan, and she studied under Mary Richmond at the New York School of Social Work.

== Career ==
After graduating from Columbia, Hoey took a job as assistant to Harry Hopkins, who was serving as the head of the Board of Child Welfare of New York City. After the US entered World War I in 1918, Hoey joined the American Red Cross, and remained in that position until June 1921. Later that year, she and two faculty members of the New York School of Social Work undertook a survey of social services in twelve cities and two rural counties in the US. From 1923 to 1926, Hoey led the Bronx division of the New York Tuberculosis and Health Association. During this time, she helped organize the Welfare Council of New York City, and served as assistant director and secretary of the Health Division of the Welfare Council between 1926 and 1936.

By 1935, Hopkins was one of many of Hoey's associates who had taken positions within the Franklin D. Roosevelt administration, serving on the Committee on Economic Security. Through connections such as Hopkins and her older brother Jim, Hoey gained a position in 1936 as the director of the Bureau of Public Assistance within the Social Security Board, later known as the Social Security Administration. The bureau was in charge of three of the major assistance titles created by the Social Security Act of 1935: Title I (old age), Title IV (Aid to Families with Dependent Children), and Title X (blindness).

Hoey had been appointed to her position within the SSA by the first chairman of the board, John G. Winant. At the time, Social Security was run by a three-person, bipartisan Board, appointed by the president and confirmed by the Senate. In 1946, the board was dissolved and replaced by a single appointed commissioner. In 1953, the Dwight D. Eisenhower administration had become frustrated by the number of federal government positions run by career civil servants who had been in place since the Roosevelt administration. That year, Hoey was one of several high-level government workers ousted from their positions to make room for political appointees. Although she was offered a lower-level position, with the expectation that she would serve out one more year before claiming her retirement position, Hoey refused to step down, and was fired by the Secretary of the Department of Health, Education, and Welfare.

After her dismissal from the bureau, Hoey became the director of social research for the National Tuberculosis Foundation. She continued to write and lecture extensively on social work, and received honorary degrees from Trinity College, College of the Holy Cross, and the University of Nebraska. She received the Siena Medal from Theta Phi Alpha in 1940. In 1955, she became the first recipient of the Florina Lasker Social Work Award, and in 1966, she was given the René Sand Award for distinguished contributions to international social work. Also in 1966, Hoey received the James J. Hoey Award for interracial justice, given by the New York Catholic Interracial Council and named for her late brother.

== Personal life ==
Hoey was a lifelong devout Roman Catholic. She was close friends with fellow Catholic social workers Harry Hopkins, William J. Kerby, and Rose McHugh, the latter of whom Hoey appointed as chief of the Division of Administrative Surveys of the Social Security Board.

Hoey's older brother Jim was a political leader within the Tammany Hall organization.

== Death ==
Hoey died of a stroke on October 6, 1968, in New York. She was 76 years old, and had been living at the Regency Hotel. A Requiem Mass was held for Hoey on October 9 at St. Paul the Apostle Church in Manhattan.

== Legacy ==
In 1967, Columbia University established the Jane M. Hoey Chair in Social Policy within the School of Social Work.
