= Agnes Regan =

American Roman Catholic social reformer

Agnes Gertrude Regan (March 26, 1869 – September 30, 1943) was an American Roman Catholic social reformer.

Regan was a native of San Francisco. Her father, born James of Carmel O'Regan, was born in Valparaíso, Chile, to an Irish father and an English mother; he came to California in 1849, and mined gold prior to working for a decade as secretary to Joseph Alemany. Joseph was also associated during his career with the Hibernia Bank. Her mother, Mary Ann Morrison, belonged to a family of Irish immigrants. Agnes graduated from the San Francisco Normal School in 1887. Until 1919 she worked as an elementary educator and administrator in the public school system. In 1920 she was elected to the post of executive secretary of the National Council of Catholic Women, moving to Washington, D.C. in the same year. In 1921 she assisted in the foundation of the Catholic Service School for Women; this would go on to become the National Catholic School for Social Service, and served as its assistant director from 1925 until her death. In this role she established a presence for Catholics in the national movement for social welfare; furthermore, she was a member of the White House Conference on Children and Democracy in 1939 and 1940. In 1933 she received the Pro Ecclesia et Pontifice award from the Holy See. Regan Hall, a dormitory on the campus of the Catholic University of America, was named in Regan's honor.

== Awards ==
Agnes received the inaugural Siena Medal from Theta Phi Alpha in 1937.
