= Pi Lambda Sigma =

Defunct American Catholic collegiate sorority

- ΠΛΣ
- Founded: June 24, 1921; 105 years ago Boston University College of Liberal Arts
- Type: Social
- Affiliation: Independent
- Status: Merged
- Merge date: June 28, 1952
- Successor: Theta Phi Alpha
- Emphasis: Catholics
- Scope: National
- Motto: "One Fold, One Shepherd"
- Colors: White and gold
- Flower: Marguerite daisy
- Jewel: Pearl
- Patron saint: St. Margaret of the Dragon
- Publication: The Torch
- Chapters: 8
- Headquarters: United States

Pi Lambda Sigma (ΠΛΣ) was an American collegiate sorority for Catholic women. It merged with Theta Phi Alpha in 1952.

== History ==
Pi Lambda Sigma was founded on June 24, 1921 at Boston University College of Liberal Arts, in Boston, Massachusetts, by women who felt that their need for close relationships and social life could best be fulfilled by a sorority. As commuters, they felt that they had little or no chance to form lasting friendships that would draw them back to their university after graduation. Pi Lambda Sigma was originally going to be a non-sectarian sorority. The founders, after further consideration, decided that the needs of Catholic women students required a Catholic sorority.

The founders were Constance Bartholomew, Mary O'Shaughnessey Brennan, Lauretta Nally Cushing, Anne Donohue, Viola Mac-Eachern Horrigan, Mary Lyons Laffoley, Margaret McDermott, Teresa Talamini, and Helen Wilson.

In 1923-1924, the chapter joined the National Pan-Hellenic Society of Boston University.

On June 28, 1952, Theta Phi Alpha agreed to a merger, with the four active chapters of Pi Lambda Sigma becoming part of Theta Phi Alpha. Two of the chapters merged with the Theta Phi chapters on their respective campuses and two became new chapters of Theta Phi Alpha.

=== Merger with Theta Phi Alpha ===
According to Ruth Thompson, a Pi Lambda Sigma sister (at the time) who worked on the merger:

"Pi Lambda Sigma was faced with several alternatives: a.) merger; b.) dissolution with assets set up in scholarship funds; and c.) each collegiate chapter would make its own decision whether to merge, go local, etc. The final vote was for the merger. I visited the Dean of Women at the University of Cincinnati and asked for advice. The administration was in favor of the merger and was helpful. We checked all NPC groups and sent questionnaires to four sororities. We received two responses besides Theta Phi's. It took two years to finalize our merger with Theta Phi Alpha. The decision was made because the ideals of both sororities were similar and we hoped that together we would become strong."

At the Pi Lambda Sigma national convention in May 1952, the members of Pi Lambda Sigma voted to merge with Theta Phi Alpha. At Theta Phi Alpha's Nineteenth National Convention in Chicago, Illinois on June 28, 1952, this merger was ratified by representatives of the full membership. At the Theta Phi Alpha convention, the National President of Pi Lambda Sigma, Alison Hume Lotter, was initiated into Theta Phi Alpha and the merger was accomplished.

== Symbols ==
Pi Lambda Sigma's insignia's badge was a black enamel shield surrounded by pearls with the Greek letters ΠΛΣ inscribed in gold. Its pledge pin was a gold Greek cross and circle. Its insignia was a cross, circle, torch, and shepherdess' crook.

The colors of Pi Lambda Sigma were white and gold. The sorority's patron saint was St. Margaret of the Dragon. Its flower was the Marguerite daisy, named for its patron saint. Its jewel was the pearl. Its motto was "One Fold, One Shepherd". Its publication was The Torch.

== Chapters ==
Pi Lambda Sigma had eight chapters in its history.

Chapter	Charter date and range	Institution	Location	Status	Ref.
Alpha	June 24, 1921 – June 28, 1952	Boston University College of Liberal Arts	Boston, Massachusetts	Merged (ΘΦΑ)	(Note: Joined the existing Eta chapter of Theta Phi Alpha.)
Beta	March 4, 1927 – 193x ?	Boston University School of Education	Boston, Massachusetts	Inactive	
Gamma	April 4, 1927 – 1947	Temple University	Philadelphia, Pennsylvania	Inactive	(Note: Originated from the Alpha Epsilon Club (local), also called "Alpha Epsilon for Arts in Education".)
Delta	May 4, 1928 – 1932 ?	University of Illinois at Urbana–Champaign	Champaign-Urbana, Illinois	Inactive	(Note: Originated as Gamma Theta Phi (local), formed in 1925.)
Epsilon	February 23, 1929 – 1947	University of New Hampshire	Durham, New Hampshire	Inactive	(Note: Originated as Lambda Phi (local), previously formed on the New Hampshire campus.)
Zeta	May 4, 1933 – June 28, 1952	University of Cincinnati	Cincinnati, Ohio	Merged (ΘΦΑ)	(Note: Originated as Beta Pi Epsilon (local), formed in 1930. When the fraternities merged, it combined with the existing Epsilon chapter of Theta Phi Alpha.)
Eta	November 20, 1947 – June 28, 1952	Quincy College	Quincy, Illinois	Merged (ΘΦΑ)	(Note: With the national merger, the chapter became the Psi chapter of Theta Phi Alpha in 1954.) (Note: Quincy College (IL) was renamed Quincy University in 1993.)
Theta	July 22, 1948 – June 28, 1952	Creighton University	Omaha, Nebraska	Merged (ΘΦΑ)	(Note: Chapter originated as Chi Mu Kappa (local), formed in 1928. This was the first sorority at Creighton. With the national merger, it became the Chi chapter of Theta Phi Alpha in 1952.)

== Governance ==
Chapter student officers were President, Vice President, Recording Secretary, Corresponding Secretary, Treasurer, Registrar, and Ritualist. Chapters also had Patronesses and an Adviser.

== National Conventions ==
As of 1939, Pi Lambda Sigma held annual conventions. The convention in 1939 was in Virginia Beach, Virginia. The Convention in June 1946 was in Boston, Massachusetts. The July 1950 convention was in Cincinnati, Ohio. The Final convention was held in May 1952 in Boston.

== See also ==
- List of social sororities and women's fraternities
