= Thomas Bouquillon =

Belgian Catholic theologian, priest and professor

The Reverend Dr. Thomas Bouquillon
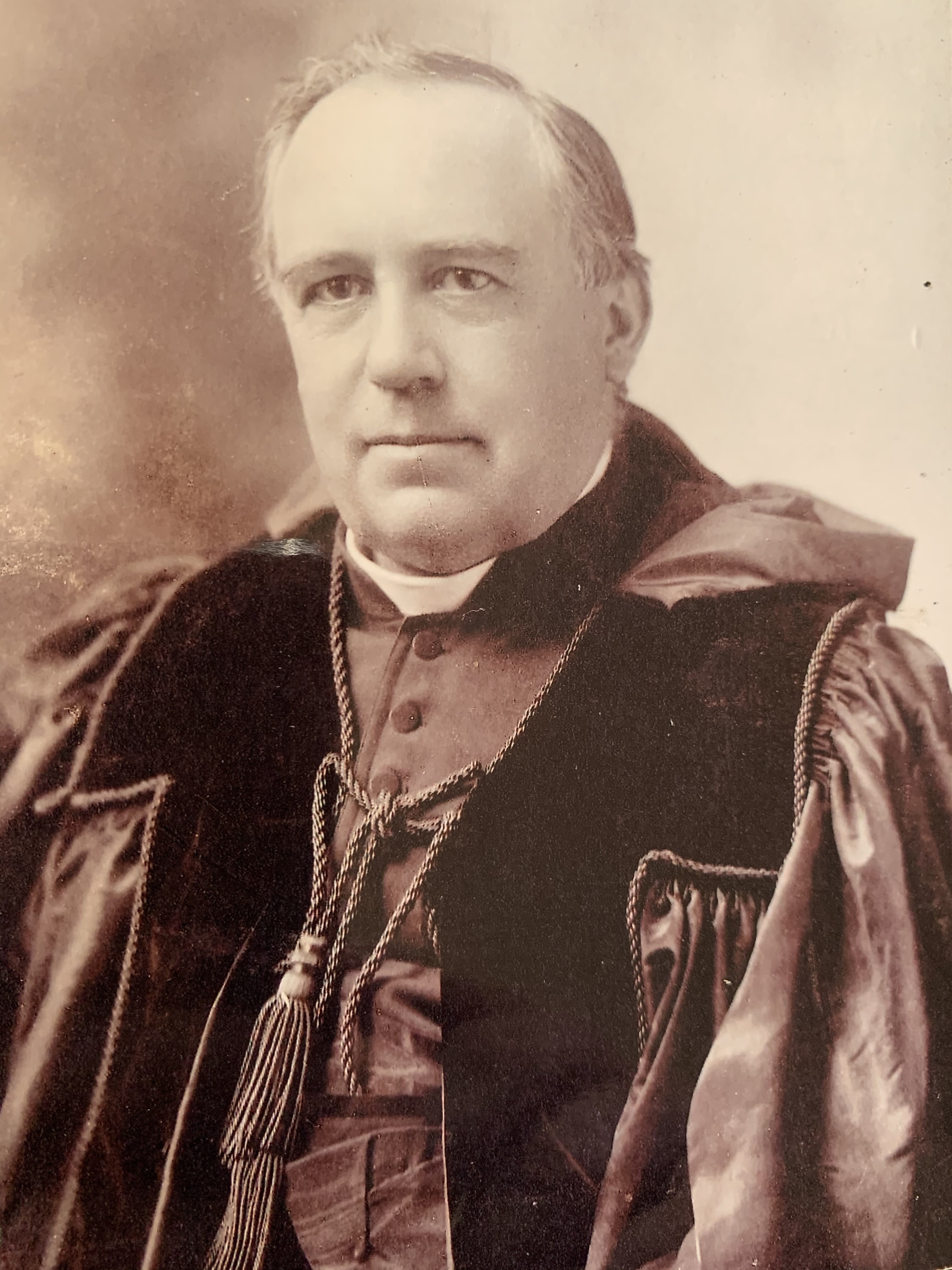
- Portrait of Bouquillon
- Born: Thomas-Joseph Bouquillon; 16 May 1840; Warneton, Belgium
- Died: 5 November 1902 (aged 62); Brussels, Belgium

Ecclesiastical career
- Religion: Christianity (Roman Catholic)
- Church: Latin Church
- Ordained: 1865 (priest)

Academic background
- Education: Gregorian University
- Influences: Thomas Aquinas; Alphonsus Liguori; Francisco Suárez

Academic work
- Discipline: Theology
- Sub-discipline: Moral theology
- School or tradition: Liberal Catholicism; neoscholasticism
- Institutions: Bruges Seminary; Institut catholique de Lille; Catholic University of America
- Influenced: William J. Kerby; John A. Ryan

Thomas-Joseph Bouquillon (French pronunciation: [tɔmɑ bukijɔ̃]; 16 May 1840 – 5 November 1902) was a Belgian Catholic theologian, priest and professor. Bouquillon was the first professor of moral theology at the Catholic University of America and introduced social sciences into its curriculum.

Regarded as a prominent Catholic theologian of his time, his contributions focus on theology, the history of theology, ecclesiastical history, canon law and bibliography. He supported the educational views of Edward McGlynn and Archbishop John Ireland Bouquillon was active and influential in the organization of the Catholic universities of Lille and Washington, D.C.

== Life ==
Thomas-Joseph Bouquillon was born on 16 May 1840 in Warneton, Belgium. He was the second son of five children in a family of small landholders long established at Warneton. He received his early education at local schools and at the College of St Louis at Menin. He studied philosophy at the Minor Seminary, Roeselare and theology at the seminary of Bruges.

Having entered the Georgian University in Rome in 1863, he was ordained as a priest in 1865 and became a doctor of theology in 1867. After ten years at the Bruges seminary and eight years at the Catholic University of Lille, France, as professor of moral theology, Bouquillon retired to the Benedictine monastery at Maredsous in 1885 and devoted his energies to the preparation of the second edition of his treatise on fundamental moral theology.

In 1892 he accepted the Chair of Moral Theology at the Catholic University of America in Washington DC, where he remained until his death on November 5, 1902, in Brussels, Belgium.

== Works ==
Though never in robust health, Bouquillon was a tireless student. When he entered the field of moral theology, he found the field had no prestige, as it had become a compilation of conclusions, rather than a study of the principles. Moral theology was out of touch, consequently, with advancing social sciences, and its methods of teaching were far from perfect. In his whole career as a professor and author Bouquillon aimed to revive moral theology from its poor academic condition and to restore proper method and dignity in the field. He emphasized the historical and sociological aspects of principles and problems in his field. Few theologians of his day were more widely consulted in Europe and America than Bouquillon.

He retained the intimate confidence of Pope Leo XIII and other eminent churchmen, and showed devotion to the ideals, teaching, and administration of the Roman Catholic Church throughout his life. He was known for an open-mindedness and a sympathy with real progress.

In 1891, he published a pamphlet on education setting out the abstract principles involved in contemporary moral theology. His views were met with considerable opposition and controversy since he had supported the state's claims in the field. In all of his published replies to critics, he maintained his original positions without any modification and ascribed the opposition to the misunderstanding of his statement of principles.

== Publications ==
=== Books ===
- "Theologia Moralis Fundamentalis" (3d ed., Bruges, 1903)
- "De Virtutibus Theologicis" (2d ed. Bruges, 1890)
- "De Virtute Religionis" (2 vols., Bruges, 1880);
- "Education" (Baltimore, 1892)
- "Education, a Rejoinder to Critics" (Baltimore, 1892)
- "Education, a Rejoinder to the 'Civilatà Cattolica'" (Baltimore, 1892); the last three of these were translated into French

=== Journal articles ===
He published many critical studies in the Revue des sciences ecclésiastiques, of which he was at one time editor, in the Nouvelle revue théologique, the Revue Bénédictine, The American Catholic Quarterly, and The Catholic University Bulletin. He edited, with notes and comments:

- Stapleton, "De Magnitudine Ecclesiæ Romanæ" (Bruges, 1881)
- 'Leonis XIII Allocutiones, Epistolæ aliaque acta" (2 vols., Bruges, 1887)
- Platelii, "Synopsis cursus Theologiæ" (Bruges)
- "Catechismus ex decreto Concilii Tridentini" (Tournai, 1890)
- "Dies Sacerdotalis" of Dirckinck (Tournai, 1888)
- Louis de Grenade, "L'Excellence de la très sainte Eucharistic" (Lille)
- Coret, "L'Année sainte" (1676) (Bruges, 1889)

== See also ==
- William J. Kerby
