= Grandma's Gifts =

Non-profit organization

Grandma's Gifts Incorporated
- Formation: 1993
- Type: Non-Profit Organization
- Purpose: To break the cycle of poverty in Appalachia
- Location: P.O. Box 2, Powell OH 43065
- Region served: Appalachia
- Website: GrandmasGifts.org

Grandma's Gifts is an incorporated, non-profit organization started by Emily Elizabeth Douglas in 1993 at age 11, in memory of her grandmother. The organization provides goods and services to impoverished children and their families while focusing on Appalachian areas of the United States. Since its inception, Grandma's Gifts has raised over USD 12 million worth of goods and services while never paying its volunteers.

== History ==
=== Norma Ackison ===
Norma Ackison's High School Photo

Norma Ackison, Emily Douglas's grandmother, was the last of twelve children to be born before her father died, leaving her mother to raise twelve children on her own during the Great Depression. Norma grew up in and around poverty until she married her husband Odell Ackison with whom she started a profitable business. Remembering the difficulties of being impoverished, she gave back to her community whenever she could while teaching her children and grandchildren the importance of giving.

In 1989, Norma was diagnosed with breast and lung cancer. After she died in 1991, a then 9-year-old Emily Douglas started driving in her grandmother's name. After two years, an organization formed and was named Grandma's Gifts in honor of Norma Ackison.

=== Development ===
Grandma's Gifts was started after a series of projects. In 1993, the group of projects prompted the start of a named organization which was when the name was chosen. In 2002, the organization began operating as a donor advise fund through The Columbus Foundation. In 2008, Grandma's Gifts became incorporation In 2010 the organization's non-profit status as a 501(c)(3) organization was finalized.

== Contributions ==
Since its inception, Grandma's Gifts has raised and distributed over 12.5 million dollars' worth of goods and services to children and their families. The goods and services are distributed by named projects organized by Grandma's Gifts or are donated directly to other non-profit organizations.

=== Projects ===
Grandma's Gifts has many projects. The projects include:

- Valentines for Veterans - A project where elementary, middle, and high school students create Valentine's Day cards for veterans. Grandma's Gifts distributes the cards to veterans in Chillicothe, Ohio and Huntington, West Virginia.
- Christmas Angel Program - Grandma's Gifts collects and distributes toys, books, and winter apparel to children and their families in their target region.
- Trick-or-Teeth - As Appalachia has the greatest oral health problems per capita in the US, Grandma's Gifts works with middle school, high school, and college students to collect and distribute dental hygiene products and educational material to children and their families through county and city health departments in Appalachia.
- Thanksgiving Turkey Sculpture - Grandma's Gifts collects and distributes frozen turkeys and non-perishable foods to families in need on Thanksgiving. Emily started this project by making a large turkey sculpture out of canned food donated at her elementary school.
- Book Drive - Grandma's Gifts collects and distributes books to children through schools, hospitals, battered family shelters, welfare agencies, and libraries. Since its inception, Grandma's Gifts has donated over 650,000 books to children in Appalachia.
- Rainbow Project - Grandma's Gifts collects and distributes school supplies to schools and children in Appalachian areas devastates by storms.

=== Monetary contributions ===
Using monetary donations, Grandma's Gifts supplies children with educational experiences and donates directly to other non-profit organizations. Examples include:

- Academy of Excellence Scholarship - The Ohio University Southern Campus hosts a two-week-long educational summer camp for children. Grandma's Gifts grants scholarships to children whose family is unable to afford the camp.
- COSI & Columbus Zoo - The organization uses monetary donations to connect students with the Columbus Center of Science and Industry, a science museum, and the Columbus Zoo and Aquarium by arranging field trips to Columbus, Ohio and on-site "COSI on Wheels" trips to Appalachian school districts.

=== Public speaking ===
Grandma's Gifts encourages students to do service for children their own age through public speaking. Emily Douglas speaks to students about her experiences with giving. She encourages the students to start their own projects by showing them easy way to do so and that she was only nine years old when she started her own projects.

== Awards and recognitions ==
Since its inception, several awards have been given to Grandma's Gifts and to Emily Douglas on behalf of Grandma's Gifts. Additionally, Grandma's Gifts has been recognized from its accomplishments by notable organizations. Some of the more notable awards and recognitions include:

- The Siena Medal from Theta Phi Alpha fraternity
- American City Business Journals's Forty Under 40 award
- Glamour Magazine's Sally Hanson Best of You finalist
- L'Oreal Paris Women of Worth Finalist
- Hannity's America as the Hero of the Week, Fox News
- Volvo For Life Awards, Semi-Finalist
- International SERTOMA, Service to Mankind Award
- American Profiles, Hometown Hero
- Miami University, Young Entrepreneur of the Year
- Temple Award for Creative Altruism from the Institute of Noetic Sciences
- Seventeen Magazine Community Service Grand Prize Winner
- Family Circle Magazine, Halo Award
- Selected as a Giraffe by the Giraffe Heroes Project, as a person who all sticks their neck out for the common good
- The American Institute for Public Service, Jefferson Award
- The Hitachi Foundation's, Yoshiyama Award for Exemplary Service to the Community
- Selected as a Paramount/UPN Network Millennium Mentor
- Recipient of the Steak Escape Curious Kid Grant
- National Child Labor Committee, Lewis Hine Award
- President's Service Award, The highest non-military award given to a US citizen for public service
- The Caring Institute, National Youth Caring Award
- Volunteer Ohio, Outstanding Youth Volunteer of the Year Award
- Freedoms Foundation, George Washington Honor Medal
- Appeared on The Oprah Winfrey Show as one of Oprah's Angels, in recognition of Grandma's Gifts
- Prudential Spirit of Community Award, National Award Winner
