= Emily Elizabeth Douglas =

American businesswoman

Emily Douglas
- Born: March 24, 1982 (age 43); Columbus, Ohio, U.S.
- Education: Miami University, Ohio State University
- Occupations: Co-Founder & CEO
- Organization: Experience Management Institute
- Known for: founder, Grandma's Gifts
- Website: GrandmasGifts.org

Emily Elizabeth Douglas (born March 24, 1982) is the founder and Executive Director of Grandma's Gifts a co-founder of Experience Management Institute.

== Education ==
Douglas attended Worthington Kilbourne High School in Worthington, Ohio and received a bachelor's degree in political science from Miami University in Oxford, Ohio in 2004. She was a member of the sorority Kappa Delta. Additionally, she holds a Master of Labor and Human Resources degree and a Master of Business Administration degree from the Ohio State University.

== Grandma's Gifts ==
In 1993, Emily Douglas founded Grandma's Gifts in memory of her grandmother, Norma Ackison, who died of breast and lung cancer in 1991 at the age of 60. Douglas' grandmother, who was one of 11 children, lost her father when she was an infant. As a child, Douglas accompanied her grandmother to purchase canned goods and clothes for veterans, and at the age of six, she believed they were for her. In the first year of Grandma's Gifts, Douglas wrote letters to her parents' friends who donated $300 to the cause, and she used the funds to purchase Christmas presents and clothes for four impoverished children in Lawrence County, Ohio.

Douglas has traveled and spoken to millions of adults and children throughout the United States about community service, youth activism, service learning, Appalachia, and literacy. She has also testified before the Ohio General Assembly and the United States Congress. Furthermore, she has made appearances on The Oprah Winfrey Show and has received multiple awards for her work as a youth activist and young adult social entrepreneur.

== Career ==
Emily is a co-founder of Experience Management Institute, which focuses on improving HR policies, practices, and structures to create more human workplaces in various organizations such as businesses, non-profits, and educational institutions. Additionally, she writes for Education Week's K–12 Talent Manager blog, where she covers topics such as strategic human resources, process improvement, leadership, and change management in education. In 2014, Anthony Salcito, Vice President of Microsoft Education, recognized Emily as a "Daily Hero in Education".
