= William J. Kerby =

19th and 20th-cneutry American sociologist and Catholic priest

Monsignor William J. Kerby
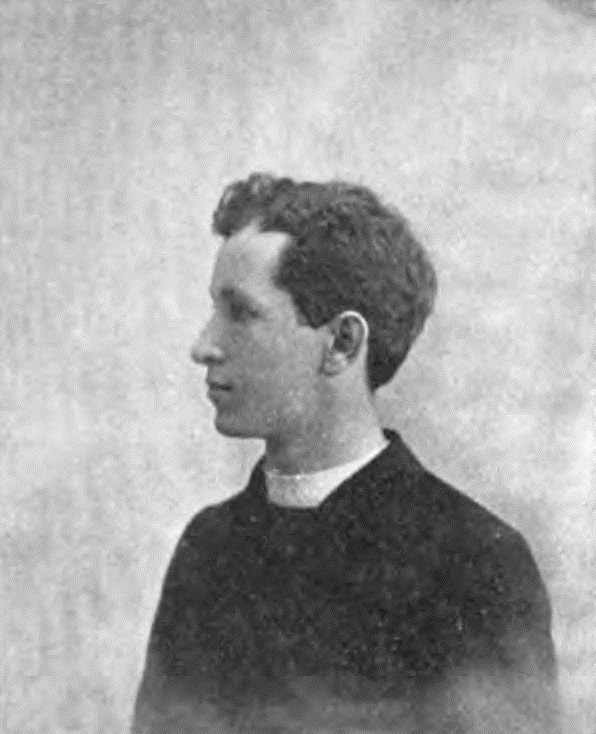

Orders
- Ordination: 1892

Personal details
- Born: William Joseph Kerby; 20 February 1870 Lawler, Iowa, United States
- Died: 27 July 1936 (aged 66) Washington, D.C., United States
- Occupation: Priest, moral theologian, and social justice advocate

William Joseph Kerby (February 20, 1870 – July 27, 1936) was an American Catholic priest, writer, sociologist and a social worker.

== Life ==
William Joseph Kerby, the son of Daniel Kerby and Ellen Rochford, was born in Lawler, Iowa, on February 20, 1870. He attended school in his hometown and graduated from St. Joseph's College, Dubuque, Iowa in 1889. He went to St. Francis Seminary in Milwaukee, Wisconsin, where he was ordained in 1892 at the age of 22. Kerby then furthered his studies at the Catholic University of America (CUA), receiving a Bachelor of Sacred Theology and a Licentiate in Theology.

Kerby's mentor was Belgian moral theologian, Fr. Thomas Bouquillon, a proponent of social science and analysis in moral living in addition to more established seminary curriculum. His interest became focused on sociology, and he studied abroad in order to help direct the developing field's new department at CUA. Kerby studied in Bonn and Berlin, Germany and Louvain, Belgium, where he receiving a Doctorate of Social and Political Science from the University of Louvain in 1897. His doctoral dissertation was an examination of American socialism.

In 1897 Kerby returned to CUA as its first professor of sociology. He often spoke of the need to get to the root causes of poverty rather than solely focusing on immediate relief for those in need. Kerby advocated using social remedies to alleviate poverty. He embraced the progressive reforms of the period calling for child labor laws, fair wages, and public health reforms. Kerby was a strong supporter of high education for women.

In 1910 Kerby was among the founders of the National Conference of Catholic Charities and was selected as the organization's first executive secretary. Kerby turned the title over to his protege John O'Grady in 1920. He died in Washington DC in 1936

== Honors ==
Kerby received an honorary doctorate of Laws from Notre Dame University in 1913.

== Works ==
- Le Socialisme aux États-Unis. Bruxelles: J. Goemaere, 1897.
- The Social Mission of Charity: A Study of Points of View in Catholic Charities. New York: The Macmillan Company, 1921.
- Prophets of the Better Hope. New York: Longmans, Green & Co., 1922.
- My Mass Book. New York: The Macmillan Company, 1929.
- The Considerate Priest. Washington, D.C.: Catholic University of America Press, 1950 [1st Pub. Philadelphia, Pa.: Dolphin Press, 1937].
- Democracy: Should it Survive? Milwaukee: The Bruce Publishing Company, 1943.

=== Articles ===
- “The Capitalist and his Point of View,” The American Catholic Quarterly Review 24, July 1899.
- “The Difficulties of the Labor Movement” The Catholic University Bulletin 5, 1899.
- “Labor Bureaus in the United States,” The Catholic University Bulletin 5 1899.
- "The Priesthood and the Social Movement," The Catholic University Bulletin 6, 1900.
- "The Academic Spirit," The Catholic University Bulletin 6, 1900.
- “The Laborer and His Point of View,“ The American Catholic Quarterly Review 26, January/October 1901.
- "The Socialism of the Socialist," The American Catholic Quarterly Review 26, January/October 1901.
- "The Public and the Labor World," The Catholic University Bulletin 8, 1902.
- “Reform and Reformers,” The American Catholic Quarterly Review 28, January/October 1903.
- "Social Reform," The American Catholic Quarterly Review 28, January/October 1903.
- "The Ethics of the Labor Union," The Catholic University Bulletin 9, 1903.
- “Socialism,” The Dolphin 4 (5), November 1903; Part II, The Dolphin 4 (6), December 1903; Part III, The Dolphin 5 (1), January 1904; Part IV, The Dolphin 5 (2), February 1904.
- "The Exhibit of Catholic Charities at St. Louis," The Catholic University Bulletin 10, 1904.
- "Principles in Social Reform," The Catholic World 80, Part II, Part III, 1904–1905.
- “Catholicity and Socialism,” The American Catholic Quarterly Review 30, January/October 1905.
- "Atheism and Socialism," The Catholic University Bulletin 11, 1905.
- “Life and Money,” The Catholic World 82, Part II, Part III, January/March, 1906; Part IV, Part V, The Catholic World 83, 1906.
- “Reinforcement of the Bond of Faith,” The Catholic World 84, Part II, October 1906/March 1907.
- “Human Nature and Property,” The Catholic World 85, No. 506, May 1907.
- “Human Nature and Social Questions,” The Catholic World 85, April/September 1907.
- “The Economic Motive,” The Catholic World 85, April/September 1907.
- "Aims in Socialism," The Catholic World 85, April/September 1907.
- "Attitudes Toward Socialism," The Catholic World 85, April/September 1907.
- "Social Work of the Catholic Church in America," Annals of the American Academy of Political and Social Science 30, November, 1907.
- "Sociological Aspects of Lying," The Catholic University Bulletin 14, 1908; Part III, The Catholic University Bulletin 15, 1909.
- "Fresh Aid for City Children," The Catholic World 87, 1908.
- “Who is my Neighbor?,” Part II, The Catholic World 87, 1908; Part III, Part IV, The Catholic World 88, 1909.
- "Problems in Charity," The Catholic World 91, September 1910.
- "The National Conference of Catholic Charities," The Catholic World 92, November 1910.
- "Private Property as it is," The Catholic World 92, February 1911.
- “The Indictment of Private Property,” The Catholic World 93, April/September 1911.
- "Radical and Conservative Fault-Finding,” Catholic World 93, April/September 1911.
- "The National Conference of Catholic Charities," The Catholic University Bulletin 18, 1912.
- “The Literature of Relief,” The Catholic World 96, October 1912/March 1913.
- "The Poor," The Catholic World 96, October 1912/March 1913.
- “The Assent of Socialism,” The Catholic World 97, No. 578, May 1913.
- “The Catholic Charities of a City,” The Ecclesiastical Review 48, June 1913.
- “On Certain Phases of Socialism,” The Catholic World 98, No. 585, December 1913.
- "Some Limitations of Relief," The Catholic University Bulletin 20, January 1914.
- “The Fundamental Relations of Charity,” The Catholic World 99, April/September 1914.
- “Our Catholic Charities,” The Catholic World 100, No. 596, November 1914.
- “The Ethics of Recommendation,” The Ecclesiastical Review 52, March 1915.
- “Conditions and Tendencies of Relief Work,” The Catholic World 101, April/September 1915.
- “The Natural History of Reform Law,” The Catholic World 102, November 1915.
- “The Courtesies of Life,” The Ecclesiastical Review 53, December 1915.
- "The Faculty of Moral Indignation,” The Catholic World 102, April 1915/March 1916.
- “The Young Priest and His Elders,” The Ecclesiastical Review 54 (3), March 1916.
- “The Late Thomas Maurice Mulry,” The Catholic World 103, No. 616, July 1916.
- “The Personal Influence of the Priest,” The Ecclesiastical Review 55, No. 4, October 1916.
- “The Priestly Temperament,” The Ecclesiastical Review 55, October 1916.
- “Impressions of the National Conference of Catholic Charities,” The Catholic World 104, October 1916/March 1917.
- “A Theory of Limitations,” The Catholic World 105, No. 627, June 1917.
- "Theories of Compensation," The Catholic World 105, June 1917.
- "The Catholic School," The Catholic Educational Review 13, 1917.
- "John Baptiste de La Salle," The Catholic Educational Review 14, 1917.
- "Labor Legislation in War Times," The Catholic Charities Review 1, 1917.
- “Re-Education by War,” The Catholic World 106, October 1917/March 1918.
- “The Priest and the Exceptional Soul,” The Ecclesiastical Review 58, January/June 1918.
- “On Certain Aspects of Spiritual Literature,” The Ecclesiastical Review 58, January/June 1918.
- “Clerical Myths,” The Ecclesiastical Review 60, January/June 1919.
- “Clerical Shyness,” The Ecclesiastical Review 60, January/June 1919.
- "Undergraduate Teaching of Sociology," The Catholic Educational Review 17, 1919.
- “Occupational Hazards in Clerical Life,” The Ecclesiastical Review 62, January 1920.
- “The Conservative Mind,” The Catholic World 110, No. 659, February 1920.
- "Social Aspects of Rights and Obligations," The Catholic World 111, May 1920.
- "Processes in Radicalism," Publication of the American Sociological Society 15, 1920.
- “James Cardinal Gibbons – An Interpretation,” The Catholic World 113, No. 674, May 1921.
- “Clerical Docility,” The Ecclesiastical Review 66, January/June 1922.
- “Leisure in Clerical Life,” The Ecclesiastical Review 66 (4), January/June 1922.
- "The Moral Diagnosis," Annals of the American Academy of Political and Social Science 103, September, 1922.
- "Bishop Shahan: Scholar," The Catholic Educational Review 30, 1932.
- "Philosophy of Society," The New Scholasticism 9 (2), pp. 156–159, 1935.

== See also ==
- John A. Ryan
