= Theta Phi Alpha =

American collegiate women's fraternity

- ΘΦΑ
- Founded: August 30, 1912; 114 years ago University of Michigan
- Type: Social
- Affiliation: NPC
- Status: Active
- Scope: National
- Motto: "Nothing great is ever achieved without much enduring"
- Slogan: Ever Loyal, Ever Lasting
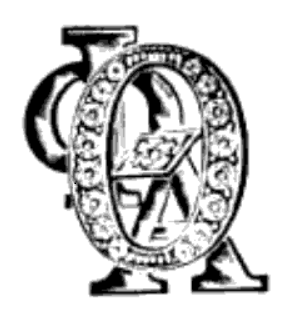
- Member badge
- Colors: Blue, Gold, and Silver
- Symbol: Compass
- Flower: White rose
- Jewel: Sapphire and Pearl
- Mascot: Penguin
- Patron saint: Catherine of Siena
- Publication: The Compass
- Philanthropy: Hunger and Homelessness
- Chapters: 54 active
- Headquarters: 27025 Knickerbocker Road; Bay Village, Ohio 44140; United States
- Website: www.thetaphialpha.org

Theta Phi Alpha (ΘΦΑ), commonly known as Theta Phi, is a women's fraternity founded at the University of Michigan – Ann Arbor on August 30, 1912. Theta Phi Alpha is one of 26 national sororities recognized in the National Panhellenic Conference. Today, Theta Phi Alpha has 54 active chapters across the United States. Theta Phi has alumnae clubs and associations in almost every major city. In 1993, Theta Phi Alpha adopted reducing homelessness as a philanthropic cause.

Although Theta Phi Alpha began as a sorority for Catholic women, the organization opened its doors to all women in 1968.

== History ==
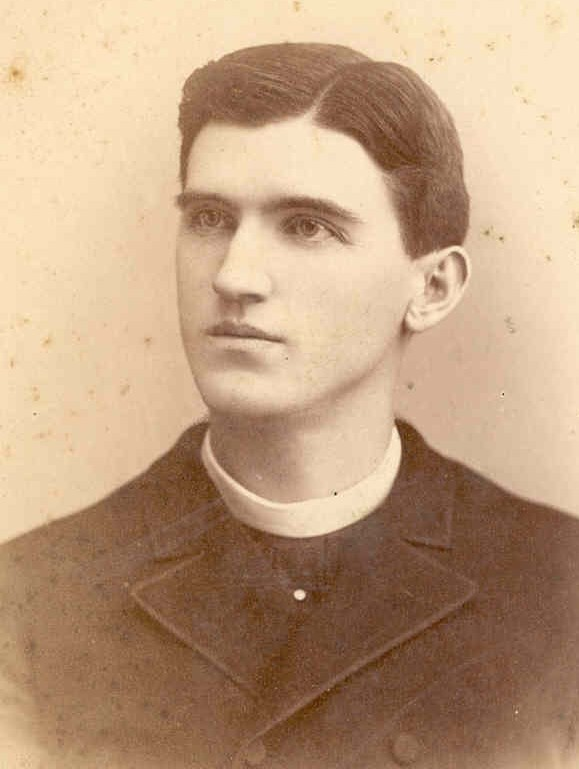
Father Edward Kelly

=== Founding ===
Father Edward D. Kelly (later bishop), a pastor of the student chapel at the University of Michigan saw a need for Catholic women to have a place to go for socialization and friendship. From this need, he started the women's fraternity Omega Upsilon in 1909 for Catholic women. Several women students were originally very interested in joining, partly because Catholics were not always welcome in the other Greek-letter sororities on campus. By founding this new Greek letter organization, Catholic women had fraternity life open to them.

By the spring of 1912, Omega Upsilon was failing financially and membership was low. Father Kelly requested the assistance of Amelia McSweeney, who graduated from the university in 1898. Amelia and other alumnae of Omega Upsilon began actively to redesign the failing organization. Throughout the summer of 1912, the ten founders prepared for the new organization. Plans for the coming school year were completed on August 30, 1912, and Theta Phi Alpha began operation on the campus of the University of Michigan.

During the first week, Theta Phi Alpha received its first new member, Kathlyn Holmes. The first initiation of Theta Phi Alpha was held on November 16, 1912, for the new sisters Kathlyn Holmes and Marie Sullivan.

The Creed of Theta Phi Alpha

“Justice to each fellow man,
Wisdom in each deed and plan,
Loyalty to every friend,
Faith that sorrow can transcend.
Truth to God and truth to self,
Honor valued over wealth,
This is the creed that in us lies,
This is the creed of loyal Theta Phis”
"The white rose for its purity,
The sapphire blue for loyalty,
The compass for its needle sure,
That holds our course firm and secure,
The silver for a precious faith,
That knows no end not even death,
This is the creed that in us lies,
The creed of loyal Theta Phis"

— ~ The Compass, 1921

=== 1950s ===
Theta Phi Alpha joined the NPC in 1951 along with ten other national sororities in the NPC's most recent expansion.

On June 28, 1952, Theta Phi Alpha absorbed Pi Lambda Sigma, the only other national Catholic women's fraternity. Pi Lambda Sigma at the time of the merger had four chapters that joined Theta Phi Alpha: their chapters at Boston University and University of Cincinnati merged with the Theta Phi Alpha chapters present there; the chapter at Creighton University became Chi chapter of Theta Phi Alpha; and the one at Quincy College became Psi chapter. The fraternity initiated the national president of Pi Lambda Sigma at the 1952 convention and welcomed all Pi Lambda Sigma sisters to become Theta Phi Alpha sisters.

=== 1970s–1980s ===
In 1969, Theta Phi Alpha hit a chapter count of 18 with the loss of Rho at Penn State. At the National Convention in 1972, Theta Phi Alpha began considering expansion to Junior and two-year colleges. Two years after this consideration, only ten chapters (Epsilon, Kappa, Sigma, Upsilon, Chi, Alpha Gamma, Alpha Epsilon, Alpha Iota, and newly installed Alpha Mu (Northern Kentucky University) and Alpha Nu (General Motors Institute)) were represented at the convention. This chapter count was well below the required number for membership in NPC. At the following convention in 1976, the Fraternity began discussing options of dissolution, merger, or commitment to growth.

The chapter count began to grow over the next four years with the reinstatement of three chapters (Alpha Beta, Alpha Xi, Alpha Zeta) until 1981 NPC notified Theta Phi Alpha they were placed in Associate Member Status due to low chapter count. The Fraternity had until 1987 to obtain 14 active chapters, the youngest had to be two years active. Due to its associate status and financial strain, Theta Phi Alpha gave up its spot as NPC treasurer in rotation for NPC Chairmanship. This also hindered the organization from acting as Vice Chairman for the following two years, and finally Chairman. Despite this setback, Theta Phi Alpha was committed to expansion. Over the subsequent six years, the fraternity gained eleven chapters and was granted full membership status in NPC in 1987.

=== 1990s ===
Looking into the new millennium, the conversation on a national level turned to the role of religion in ritual. In 1968, Theta Phi opened its doors to women of all faiths and replaced the crucifix used in rituals with a cross. In 1988, there was a discussion of removing the cross in ritual. The discussion was tabled during the convention but it was decided that the cross would have a less prominent role in ritual In 1990, Theta Phi Alpha surveyed the sisters about the Catholic influences in the ritual. The most positive response was to adjust the ritual to match the current views of the national fraternity, while the most negative response was to remove all references to God in the ritual. This dissonance between the sisters is still discussed today. However, Theta Phi Alpha has slowly removed religious aspects, in 1990 the Lord's Prayer was removed from the ritual. In 1992, the Theta Phi Alpha Prayer was removedand the following year a less religious ritual for deceased members and a nonreligious national philanthropy, The House that Theta Phi Alpha Built was introduced.

Other efforts were made to create a new national identity during this time. In 2003, the logo and tagline were developed. At this time, the fraternity was also looking to honor its history as a singing fraternity. In 2010, a national songbook was developed and a CD with the songs called Everlasting Melodies was given out as grab bag gifts at the National Convention.

During this time there was also an interest to strengthen existing chapters, now that the fraternity was in good standings with NPC. The fraternity began to develop programs to increase the leadership abilities of each chapter. These efforts included instating the leadership conference in 1991 as well as developing standards for sisters as well as new members. The standards for new members were focused on new member education through the development of a program called My Sister, My Friend. The fraternity also created Leadership Consultants to advise chapters throughout the country. The fraternity also began to look at risk management concerning hazing and alcohol abuse in 1987. In 1993, a national risk management and chapter operation manual was created.

In 1998, the majority of chapters fell below the minimum chapter size, were in violation of hazing or alcohol policies, or did not meet financial obligations. This sparked the establishment of many programs such as Compass Point and Reflections to help chapters grow and look at chapter life. The National Office also began to improve communication through the development of a national website. In 2003, a fine was instated for chapters with membership numbers under the campus total number of girls possible to recruit for its campus. This controversial fine was created to keep chapters active in recruitment. The following year a GPA minimum and value-based recruitment system were put in place as a way to strengthen chapter membership. Theta Phi Alpha approved the expansion of its Grand Council from five to seven members in 2006 to have more of a focus on chapter assistance.

== Founders ==
Theta Phi Alpha founders

The founders of Theta Phi Alpha are eight alumnae of the university and two undergraduates. These women collectively selected the fraternity's flower, jewels, and colors.

=== Dorothy Phalan ===
Dorothy Phalan (née Caughey) assisted in the founding of the sorority by providing the original meeting space to plan the reorganization of Omega Upsilon. Her daughter, Margaret, became the first legacy of Theta Phi Alpha to pledge.

=== Katrina Ward ===
After graduating from the University of Michigan in 1911 with a literary degree, Katrina Ward (née Caughey) assisted the new Theta Phi Alpha as an Omega Upsilon alumnae. Alongside her sister, Dorothy Phalan, she supported the original meetings of Theta Phi Alpha. She believed that experience through adversity strengthened fraternal bonds.

=== Mildred Connely ===
Mildred Connely focused on turning Theta Phi Alpha into a national sorority by visiting old Omega Upsilon members. She was the second president, the first chairman of the board of trustees, and the first recipient of the Guard of Honor. She was the primary writer of the creed and earned the distinction of the "Lifetime Keeper of the Ritual."

=== Selma Gilday ===
Selma Gilday was born on August 21, 1877, in Monroe, Michigan. She attended the University of Michigan and graduated with a degree in Latin and German in 1902. She was present at the first tea for Theta Phi Alpha and focused on securing alumnae support for the new organization. After founding Theta Phi Alpha, Gilday went on to teach German, Latin, and mathematics for 46 years in Toledo where she organized the Toledo-Monroe City Alumnae Association. She died on June 10, 1958.

=== Otilia O'Hara ===
Otilia O'Hara (née Leuchtweis) was an undergraduate founder and the first member to sign the record book. She became president of the Alpha chapter in 1912. She, along with Eva Bauer Everson, located and secured the home for the newest sisters of Theta Phi Alpha. She also managed the first recruitment effort which brought in ten members. After she graduated the following year, O'Hara remained involved in the fraternity, chairing the committee that selected the gift of silver flatware presented to Alpha at the 1941 national convention.

=== Amelia McSweeney ===
After graduating from the University of Michigan in 1898 as an alumna of Omega Upsilon, Amelia McSweeney became an important figure in education and civic life in Detroit. This experience in civic life and education was the reason Father Edward A. Kelly approached her to found this new Catholic sorority. She believed strongly in the early need for Panhellenic recognition on campus. On December 12, 1913, on one of her trips for the sorority, she contracted meningitis. She died from the illness on January 4, 1914.

=== Camilla Sutherland ===
Camilla Sutherland (née Ryan) was an alumna teacher of Omega Upsilon when she was approached by Bishop Edward Kelly to establish the sorority. She believed that for the organization to survive, participants could not separate undergraduate and graduate members. She utilized this belief when setting up the national structure, which is today almost entirely run by alumnae. Sutherland and her sister hosted a joint meeting of the grand council and the board of trustees in 1931 in their family home.

=== Helen Quinlan ===
Helen Quinlan (née Ryan) graduated from the University of Michigan in 1908 and started teaching mathematics in Detroit. She was a prominent Catholic woman in the Cleveland area where she formed the first National Council of Catholic Women. She contributed her Catholic influence and charitable work to the new Theta Phi Alpha fraternity.

=== May C. Ryan ===
As a founding member, May is credited with developing the name, motto, and original coat of arms for Theta Phi Alpha. She was also a member of the board of trustees until she died on May 18, 1935.

=== Eva Bauer Everson ===
Eva Regina Stroh, later known as Eva Bauer Everson, was a collegiate founder. She acquired the furnishings and housing for the original Theta Phi Alpha house in the summer of 1912 as a freshman, along with Otilia Leuchtweis. Before she entered the University, she found solace in the St. Catherine of Siena Catholic Church, whose namesake became the patroness of the Theta Phi Alpha fraternity. Showing her involvement in Theta Phi Alpha, she named the fraternity as a beneficiary in her will.

== Symbols ==
Theta Phi Alpha's colors are blue, gold, and silver. Blue represents the bond between sisters, while silver and gold represent endless faith. The fraternity's jewels are sapphire for loyalty and the pearl. The fraternity's symbol, a compass, represents direction. Its flower is a white rose. Its mascot is a penguin.

The coat of arms is an azure crest with a diagonal band between a cross with two beams on each arm and top, bearing a Tudor rose with black seeds and gold. The bottom beam is pointed and longer than the others, while a cloak-like blue and gold arch covers the top. Over the esquire's helmet, the crest has an open book with a silver and gold edge. This book is imprinted with two blue fleur-de-lis. The motto, Theta Phi Alpha in Greek lettering, is written in upper and lower case on the blue banner on the bottom of the crest.

The fraternity recognizes Saint Catherine of Siena as its patroness. Her motto, "Nothing great is ever achieved without much enduring," is the fraternity's official motto. The slogan is "Ever Loyal, Ever Lasting" The Siena Medal is the highest award given to a non-member of Theta Phi Alpha by the fraternity. Because of the respect and reverence for Saint Catherine, her feast day, April 30, is used to celebrate the fraternity's founding because the original date, August 30, frequently does not fall within the academic year at most universities.

=== Badges ===
The Theta Phi Alpha badge is a gold letter Θ set with pearls, superimposed upon plain gold letters Φ and Α.The new member pin is a square badge, with rounded corners, in black enamel with a gold compass in the center and a gold border.

The national president's badge, worn by the national president during her term in office, is similar to the official badge but with the Theta set with diamonds, mounted on a wreath of gold. The chapter president's badge is purchased by a chapter and worn by its president during her term. Similar to the national president's badge, but with the Theta set with sapphires. The grand council badge, worn by each member of the grand council (other than the national president), is set with alternating diamonds and sapphires and a diamond in the center, mounted on a wreath of gold, and is worn accompanied by a guard. Guards are worn by current and former members of the grand council and depict the fraternity's coat of arms set with a sapphire on each side.

== Philanthropy ==
=== Foundation ===
The Theta Phi Alpha Foundation oversees the organization's philanthropic causes. The foundation provides resources for Theta Phi Alpha for scholarships, philanthropy, community service, and education through charitable giving. The vision of the Theta Phi Alpha Foundation is stated as one of "ever loyal commitment, everlasting support." While the Theta Phi Alpha Foundation oversees national philanthropic causes, each chapter may also support additional philanthropic causes.

=== Hunger and Homelessness ===
Theta Phi Alpha adopted the philanthropic cause of providing shelter in an effort to reduce homelessness in 1993. Now over 30 years later, our philanthropic efforts continue to center around this cause. Rebranded to Hunger and Homelessness at our 2024 National Convention, our chapters strongly support this effort with their philanthropy and community service activities. The intention of the program is for our members in Theta Phi Alpha to work towards providing shelter and necessary care items for those who need it, as well as working to end food insecurity.

== Membership ==
=== Chapters ===
A chapter is a local Theta Phi Alpha organization at a single college or university. As of August 1, 2022, Theta Phi Alpha had 55 active collegiate chapters as well as 37 alumnae associations and clubs across the United States.

Chapters are named with Greek letters in order of their date of installation, with the first chapter being the Alpha chapter. If a chapter closes for any reason, no other Theta Phi Alpha chapter is allowed to utilize its Greek name designation until a chapter can be re-chartered or re-established at the same college or university.

To become a chapter, a group begins as an emerging chapter. An emerging chapter is a group of women working together to complete the requirements to become a chapter of Theta Phi Alpha. Once established, an emerging chapter is expected to fulfill nineteen requirements or "pearls." Once these requirements are fulfilled, the emerging chapter goes through installation where its members become fully initiated into the fraternity. As of August 1, 2022, there are no emerging chapters.

== Governance ==
=== National convention ===
The supreme governing body of Theta Phi Alpha is the national convention which happens once every other year. The national convention is held in even-numbered years while a complementary Leadership Conference is held in odd-numbered years.

=== National structure ===
The Grand Council is composed of seven officers who are elected at the National Convention. The Grand Council manages the affairs of the Fraternity between conventions by holding four meetings a year. The board of trustees is composed of five members who are elected at the Convention for a four-year term. The National President serves as an ex-officio member. Three of the trustees must have been previous national officers. The board of trustees advises on national policy, coordinates the awards and elections program, oversees the selection of the Siena Medal recipients, and appoints the other national officers.

== Awards ==
Guard of Honor pin

Theta Phi Alpha has several awards available for bestowal upon members and nonmembers of the women's fraternity. These awards are given out at national conventions.

Collegiate chapters may win the Circle of Excellence Award, an award established in 2008 to recognize outstanding collegiate chapters. Chapters must apply for this award based on campus involvement, community service, national organization contributions, and others. An outstanding alumnae association may win a Diamond Jubilee Award for excellence in membership, financial management, program planning, and other criteria. This award is a silver-loving cup crowned with the Lady of Victory.

Individuals may also win awards. The Guard of Honor is the highest award the fraternity can give to a member and recognizes lifelong contributions to the fraternity. Recipients receive a guard pin with a Tudor rose in gold and a sapphire center. As of 2014, only 78 sisters have received a Guard of Honor pin. A complete list of honorees can be found on the Theta Phi Alpha website. Another award, the Senior Service Award, is given on Founders' Day to a collegiate senior whose scholarship, leadership, character, and service to fraternity and school have been commendable.

=== Siena Medal ===
The Siena Medal is an award given by Theta Phi Alpha. The medal is the highest honor the organization bestows upon a non-member and is named after Saint Catherine of Siena. The past recipients of the Siena Medal are:

Year	Recipient	Accomplishment	Ref.
1937	Agnes Regan	First executive secretary to the National Council of Catholic Women and supporter of education for all regardless of race or sex	
1938	Mary Merrick	National Christ Child Society founder and lifetime director	
1939	Agnes Repplier	Essayist known for contemporary commentary	
1940	Jane M. Hoey	director of the Public Assistance Bureau of the Social Security Board	
1941	Anne O'Hare McCormick	first woman recipient of the Pulitzer Prize in Journalism	
1942	Anne Sarachon Hooley	National Council of Catholic Women president	
1943	Katharine Drexel	founder of the Sisters of the Blessed Sacrament for Indians & Colored People	
1944	Helen C. White	president for the American Association of University Women and the American Association of University Professors	
1945	Alleta Sullivan	mother of the Sullivan brothers who were lost in the sinking of the USS Juneau off Guadalcanal	
1946	Frances Parkinson Keyes	novelist and biographer	
1947	Mary Teresa Norton	United States Congresswoman from New Jersey 1925–1951; chairman of the House Committee on Labor	
1948	Madeleva Wolff	educator, poet, and author, president of St. Mary's College, and president of the Catholic Poetry Society of America	
1950	Loretta Young	actress known for The Loretta Young Show, The Stranger, and The Bishop's Wife	
1951	Anne Laughlin	administrator for National Youth Administration, United Nations Relief and Rehabilitation Administration, as well as UNICEF.	
1952	Elizabeth G. Salmon	first woman president of American Catholic Philosophical Association	
1954	Sister M. Ignatia	first to work with the founders of Alcoholics Anonymous in the hospitalization and assistance of alcoholics	
1956	Phyllis McGinley	1961 Pulitzer Prize recipient, elected to the National Institute of Arts and Letters	
1958	Mary Harden Looram	acted as the chairman of the motion picture department of the International Federation of Catholic Alumnae	
1960	Mary Ellen Kelly	founder of the League of Shut-In Sodalists as an immobilized arthritic	
1962	Maria Augusta Trapp	leader of the Trapp Family Singers	
1964	Irene M. Auberlin	World Medical Relief founder and president	
1966	Dorothy Julia Willman	co-founder of the Summer Schools for the Christian Apostolate and associate editor of Directions magazine	
1968	Rosemary Kilch	Women in Community Service president	
1976	Hattie Larlham	Hattie Larlham Foundation co-founder	
1986	Candy Lightner	Mothers Against Drunk Driving founder	
1988	Anne M. Burke	Special Olympics founder	
1990	Helen Thomas	first woman member and President of the White House Correspondents Association	
1992	Eileen Stevens	founder of the Committee to Halt Useless College Killings after the death of her son Chuck Stenzel	
1994	Linda Caldwell Fuller	Habitat for Humanity International co-founder	
1996	Nancy Goodman Brinker	Susan G. Komen Breast Cancer Foundation founder	
1998	Barbara McKillip	founder of the Libri Foundation, an organization that provided children's books to rural libraries	
2000	Kay Redfield Jamison	advocate in her field of manic depression illness	
2002	Pamela Martin	Homeward Bound executive director	
2004	Susan Davenny-Wyner	Soprano solo singer and conductor	
2006	Andrea Cooper	mother who shared the story of her daughter's rape and subsequent suicide with college students.	
2008	Diane Straub	U.S. Paralympic team gold medalist and world record holder for swimming.	
2010	Emily Elizabeth Douglas	founder, at the age of 11, of Grandma's Gifts in memory of her grandmother, Norma Ackison.	
2012	Elizabeth Smart	activist for sexual predator legislation and the Amber alert system	
2014	Rachel Simmons	author of Odd Girl Out: The Hidden Culture of Aggression in Girls, and The Curse of the Good Girl: Raising Authentic Girls with Courage and Confidence	
2016	Terry Grahl	Enchanted Makeovers founder and CEO	
2018	Ginny Carroll	Circle of Sisterhood founder and executive director	
2020	Nikole Collins-Puri	TechBridge Girls founder	
2022	Dolly Chugh	Award-winning professor at the New York University Stern School of Business and author	
2024	Kristin Smedley	Activist and educator about blindness (mother of two blind children). Has nonprofit thrivingblindacademy.org	

== See also ==
- List of social sororities and women's fraternities
