= John A. Ryan =

19th- and 20th-century American Catholic priest and theologian

Monsignor John A. Ryan
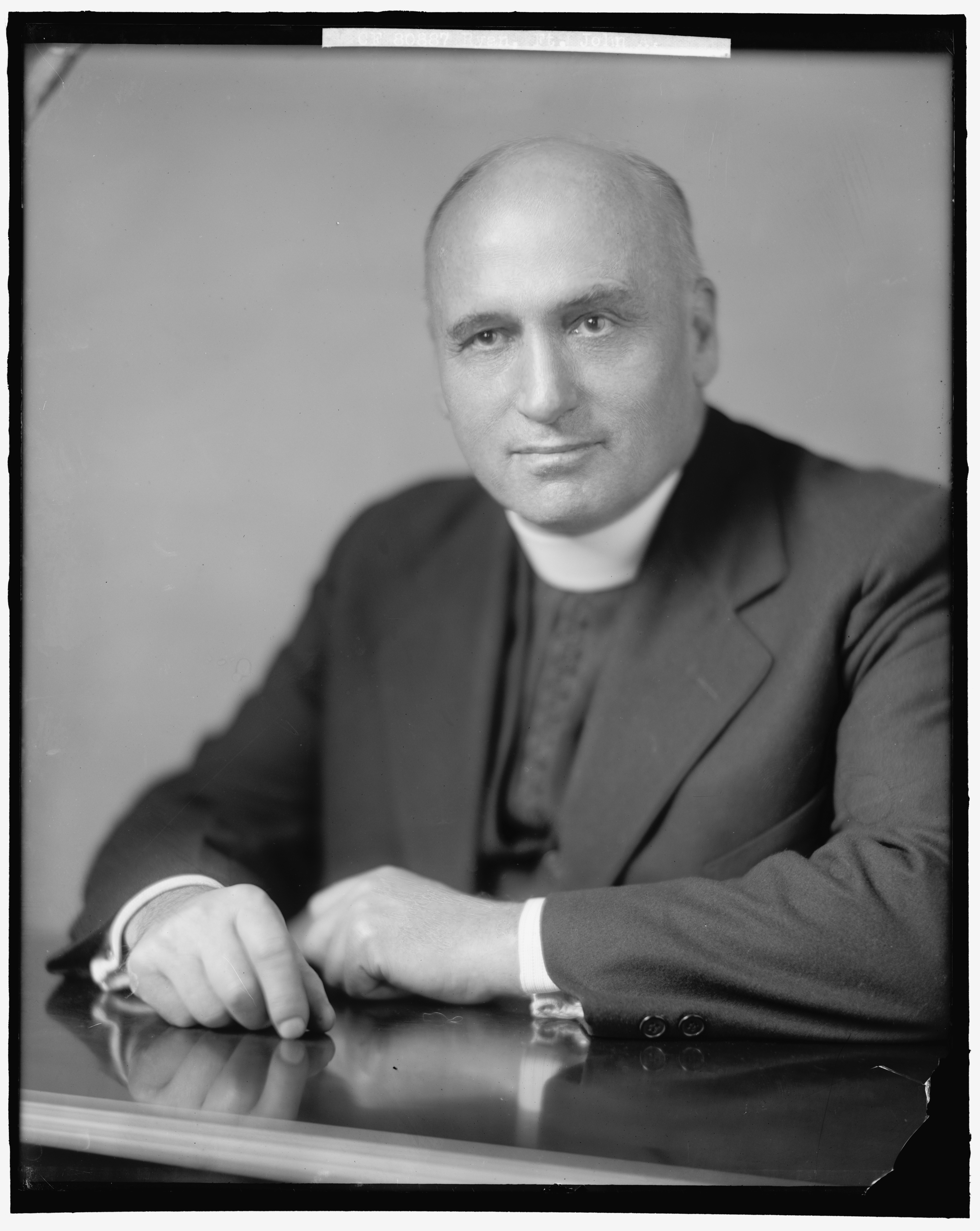
- Ryan, 1905–1945
- Born: John Augustine Ryan; May 25, 1869; Vermillion, Minnesota, US
- Died: September 16, 1945 (aged 76); Saint Paul, Minnesota, US

Ecclesiastical career
- Religion: Catholic Church
- Church: Latin Church
- Ordained: 1898

Academic background
- Education: St. Thomas Aquinas Seminary; Saint Paul Seminary; Catholic University of America
- Influences: Thomas Bouquillon; Ignatius L. Donnelly; Richard T. Ely; J. A. Hobson; John Ireland; William J. Kerby; Pope Leo XIII

Academic work
- Discipline: Theology
- Sub-discipline: Moral theology
- School or tradition: Thomism
- Institutions: Saint Paul Seminary; Catholic University of America
- Notable works: A Living Wage (1906)
- Influenced: Philip Murray

John Augustine Ryan (May 25, 1869 – September 16, 1945) was an American Catholic priest who was a noted moral theologian and advocate of social justice. Ryan lived during a decisive moment in the development of Catholic social teaching within the United States. The largest influx of immigrants in America's history, the emancipation of American slaves, and the Industrial Revolution had produced a new social climate in the early twentieth century, and the Catholic Church faced increasing pressure to take a stance on questions of social reform.

Ryan saw the social reform debate of the early twentieth century as essentially an argument between libertarian individualists and collectivists concerned with equality, and thus contended that an emphasis on human welfare framed in natural law theory provided the most promising means to combine conflicting concerns over individual and social welfare. Ryan's influential response was the development of a Catholic critique of the American capitalist system that emphasized the existence of absolute natural human rights.

While Ryan identified himself primarily as a moral theologian, he also made important contributions to American political life and economic thought. He supported a number of social reforms that were eventually incorporated into the New Deal, and have become elemental to the modern welfare state. Ryan's most well-known contribution to American economic thought was his argument for a minimum wage presented in A Living Wage, a reformulation of his doctoral dissertation.

Ryan recognized the importance of a "synergistic relation among scholarship, moral teaching, and political activism," which led to his vigorous application of moral thinking to the political arena.

== Early life ==
Ryan was born on May 25, 1869, in Vermillion, Minnesota, to William Ryan and Maria[h] Luby. Raised in the Populist tradition on a farm homesteaded by his Irish Catholic parents alongside his ten younger siblings, Ryan's childhood experience with the challenges faced by farmers informed his early investment in economic justice and the role of the Catholic Church in promoting social change.

Ryan's interest in moral reflection on contemporary economic issues and empathy for the poor was further cultivated in his early teenage years when Ryan read Henry George's Progress and Poverty. While Ryan later confessed to not fully understanding the book at the time, he cites his first reading of George's work as the beginning of a lifelong commitment to questions of social justice.

== Education and academic life ==
Ryan attended secondary school at the Christian Brothers School in 1887, and continued his studies at the St. Thomas Aquinas Seminary in Saint Paul, Minnesota, now named the University of St. Thomas. He graduated valedictorian of his class in 1892. Ryan was a member of the inaugural class at the Saint Paul Seminary in 1894. Graduating in 1898, Ryan received his holy orders from Archbishop John Ireland of the Archdiocese of Saint Paul and Minneapolis. With Ireland's permission, he then moved to Washington, DC, to pursue graduate studies at the Catholic University of America the same year. At the Catholic University of America, Ryan received his licentiate in literature in 1900 and his Doctorate of Sacred Theology in 1906.

Ryan saw his own vocation as the teaching of moral theology and economic justice to the American electorate, emphasizing in particular his influence on Catholic voters and politicians. While much of his instruction emerged from the numerous articles and pamphlets he wrote throughout his lifetime, Ryan also held official professorships. He taught moral theology at the St. Paul Seminary from 1902 to 1915, and then returned to Washington where he served as a professor at the Catholic University of America from 1915 until 1939, teaching graduate-level courses in moral theology, industrial ethics, and sociology. During his tenure at the Catholic University of America, Ryan also taught economics and social ethics at Trinity College in Washington, now known as Trinity Washington University.

== Economic thought ==
Ryan viewed the separation of economic thought from religious and ethical rules as the root of practical economic problems faced by Americans in the early half of the twentieth century. While at St. Paul Seminary in 1894, Ryan read Pope Leo XIII's encyclical Rerum novarum in which he found Leo's statement that all laborers had a right to adequate worldly goods in order to live in frugal comfort, and the state was obliged to guarantee that right.

In 1902, American Catholic Quarterly Review published Ryan's essay, "The Morality of the Aims and Methods of Labor Unions", a piece supportive of unions.

Ryan's licentiate dissertation, Some Ethical Aspects of Speculation, investigated the morality of speculation. His Doctor of Sacred Theology dissertation was an influential early economic and moral argument for minimum wage legislation. It was published as A Living Wage in 1906. Ryan insisted in the text that all men had a right to a living wage, adequate to support himself and his family. Always grounding his political thought in moral theology, Ryan argued that Rerum novarum converted the living wage "from an implicit to an explicit principle of Catholic ethics".

Published in 1916, Ryan's second major scholarly work was the book Distributive Justice: The Right and Wrong of Our Present Distribution of Wealth, in which he provided an examination of rent from land, interest on capital, profits from enterprise, and wages for labor in relation to moral principles. As with A Living Wage, Ryan drew on both ethical and economic reasoning; he claimed that all four agents of production – the worker, entrepreneur, capitalist, and landowner – had a claim to the finished product because each contributed an indispensable element to its production. Ryan further objected at a practical and moral level to both the Puritan industrial ethic and the "gospel of consumption" that encouraged increased consumption through the production of new forms of demand, such as luxury goods and services. Ryan again saw both these flawed economic views as the outcome of a historic separation between ethics and economic life. Ryan based his own vision of economic progress in America on equitable wealth distribution, decreased working hours, and a guaranteed minimum wage. Clear in Ryan's economic thought was a disciplined commitment to both ethical and practical analysis of his country's economic problems.

While A Living Wage has achieved a higher degree of recognition, Ryan stated in his autobiography, "Distributive Justice is unquestionably the most important book I have written."

In these early publications Ryan staked out an economic position that maintained the primacy of private property but spurned overly acquisitive and unregulated free-market capitalism as economically unhealthy and morally bankrupt. He would argue this economic philosophy for his entire life.

== Public life ==
Just as Ryan's economic thought was guided by a commitment to moral theology, his political action was inextricably connected to his religious beliefs. Though Ryan was primarily an intellectual and moral theologian, his deep conviction that the church had a proper role to play in public affairs led him to maintain a consistent engagement in American politics throughout his lifetime. Ryan avoided political labels such as liberal or conservative, but eventually settled on "papalist" to describe his public position, meaning "an orthodox commitment to the Holy See." Ryan viewed the proper role of the state as the active promotion of the common good only to the extent that it cannot be realized through the family or voluntary associations. Ryan was among the earliest advocates of minimum wage laws in the United States.

=== Program for social reconstruction ===
Aside from his influential texts A Living Wage and Distributive Justice, and a number of other political and economic pamphlets, Ryan authored the "Program for Social Reconstruction" in 1919, a text that was adopted by the Administrative Committee of the National Catholic War Council as a statement of their social and economic objectives and became the Bishops' Program of Social Reconstruction. A number of authors have cited the text as a blueprint for the New Deal legislation, though others have also stated that such connections have been exaggerated. However direct Ryan's influence was on the New Deal, the text offered liberal social reforms that emphasized an active role for the state in promoting social justice, many of which were enacted during President Franklin D. Roosevelt's administration. Yet, the text also involved a number of less successful reforms that defy popular interpretations of Ryan as a strictly liberal political thinker, such as a federal ban on the dissemination of information on birth control and rigid support for abortion laws. What is most evident in the "Program for Social Reconstruction" is Ryan's systematic application of Catholic ethics to social reconstruction.

=== Political activities ===
Beyond authoring political texts, Ryan also took a number of decisively political actions. While teaching at St. Paul Seminary, Ryan took an active interest in trade unions, promoting their cause to outside groups, addressing union gatherings, and helping to author and promote social legislation.

In 1923, Ryan initiated the Catholic Conference on Industrial Problems.

After teaching at the Catholic University of America, Ryan became head of the Social Action Department of the National Catholic Welfare Conference, a position that allowed him substantial opportunities to influence politicians in Washington. He was a noted supporter of the failed Child Labor Amendment to the US Constitution, despite opposition from the influential Archbishop of Boston, Cardinal William Henry O'Connell.

Ryan also worked actively with the National Consumers' League, which attempted to encourage consumers to push for decent working conditions. In 1927, Ryan founded the Catholic Association for International Peace.

Ryan was such a fervent supporter of the New Deal that he was nicknamed "Monsignor New Deal".

1n 1931, Ryan urged the federal government to develop a $5-billion public works campaign.

In 1933, the Roosevelt administration enlisted Ryan's assistance in mustering support among Catholic clerics for its NRA codes. In 1934, Ryan was elected to the three-person Industrial Appeals Board of the National Recovery Administration.

One of Ryan's most controversial ventures into American politics was his national radio endorsement of Democratic Party candidate Franklin D. Roosevelt when he ran for re-election as president in 1936. When the "Radio Priest", Charles Coughlin, turned vehemently against Roosevelt and the New Deal during the 1936 presidential campaign, and encouraged his listeners to vote instead for William Lemke of Coughlin's new Union Party, Ryan countered with an overtly partisan political speech ("Roosevelt Safeguards America") broadcast on national radio on October 8, 1936, urging Catholics to repudiate Coughlin and support the New Deal and Roosevelt. Wary of the potential controversy his speech could arouse, he began the endorsement by stating, "I am making tonight what is liable to be called a political speech. It is not that. It is mainly a discussion of certain political events in the light of moral law." Nevertheless, the endorsement led Ryan into open conflict with Coughlin, who gave Ryan the sarcastic sobriquet "The Right Reverend New Dealer". The speech also cost Ryan the confidence of Archbishop Michael J. Curley of Baltimore.

On January 20, 1945, he gave the benediction at the inauguration of President Franklin Roosevelt's fourth term.

== Reception ==
During his lifetime, Ryan met fierce criticism for his economic and political thought. He was at times labeled a socialist for his endorsement of policies such as public housing, social security, medical insurance, unemployment insurance, and women's rights in the work place as well as for his critique of unregulated free-market capitalism.

Refusing to prescribe to either a liberal or conservative political doctrine but instead choosing to support policies based on his theological beliefs, Ryan displeased both liberal and conservative politicians at times. Ryan's overtly political acts also earned him disapproval within the Catholic Church.

Yet Ryan was also a deeply respected moral theologian throughout his lifetime. With his position with the National Catholic Welfare Conference, he was authorized by the bishops as their principal Catholic spokesman for social reform within the United States, and became the first Catholic priest to deliver the benediction at a presidential inauguration in 1937.

== Death and legacy ==
After a short illness, Ryan died on September 16, 1945, in his home state of Minnesota. He was buried at Calvary Cemetery. He is remembered today as an early and essential advocate for social reform in the first half of the twentieth century. He maintains a unique role in the history of the American Catholic tradition as a pioneer in the application of Catholic theology to questions of social justice in industrial society.

The John A. Ryan Institute for Catholic Social Thought at University of St. Thomas explores the relationship between the Catholic social tradition and business theory and practice by fostering a deeper integration of faith and work.

== Published works ==
- A Living Wage: Its Ethical and Economic Aspects. New York: Macmillan Co. 1906. OCLC 1048795962.
- Francisco Ferrer, Criminal Conspirator. St. Louis, Missouri: B Herder Book Co. 1911.
- Alleged Socialism of the Church Fathers. St. Louis, Missouri: B Herder Book Co. 1913.
- A Living Wage: Its Ethical and Economic Aspects (rev. ed.). New York: Macmillan Co. 1914.
- Socialism: Promise or Menace? With Hillquit, Morris. New York: Macmillan Co. 1914. hdl:2027/uc2.ark:/13960/t9h41nb7d. OCLC 2619720.
- Distributive Justice: The Right and Wrong of Our Present Distribution of Wealth. New York: Macmillan Co. 1916.
- The Church and Socialism and Other Essays. Washington: The University Press. 1919.
- The Church and Labor. With Husslein, Joseph. New York: Macmillan Co. 1920.
- Social Reconstruction. New York: Macmillan Co. 1920.
- The State and the Church. With Millar, Moorhouse F. X. New York: Macmillan Co. 1922.
- Declining Liberty and Other Papers. New York: Macmillan Co. 1927.
- Distributive Justice: The Right and Wrong of Our Present Distribution of Wealth (rev. ed.). New York: Macmillan Co. 1927.
- The Catholic Church and the Citizen. New York: Macmillan Co. 1928.
- Questions of the Day. Boston: Stratford Co. 1931. OCLC 878520081.
- A Better Economic Order. New York: Harper and Brothers. 1935.
- Seven Troubled Years, 1930–1936: A Collection of Papers on the Depression and on the Problems of Recovery and Reform. Ann Arbor, Michigan: Edwards Brothers. 1937.
- Catholic Principles of Politics. With Boland, Francis J. New York: Macmillan Co. 1940. (Note: This is a revised edition of The State and the Church.)
- Social Doctrine in Action: A Personal History. New York: Harper and Brothers. 1941.
- Distributive Justice: The Right and Wrong of Our Present Distribution of Wealth (3rd ed.). New York: Macmillan Co. 1942.
- The Norm of Morality Defined and Applied to Particular Actions. Ann Arbor, Michigan: Edwards Brothers. 1944.
- The Church and Interest-Taking. St. Louis: B. Herder, 1910.
- A Minimum Wage By Legislation. St. Louis: Central Bureau of German Roman Central Verein, 1911.
- Social Reform on the Catholic Lines. Brooklyn: Volksverein, Greenpoint, 1912.
- The Living Wage. Catholic Social Guild Series. London: Catholic Truth Society, 1913.
- Social Reform on Catholic Lines. New York; Columbus Press, 1914. (revised edition)
- Minimum Wage Laws to Date. New York: Paulist Press, 1915.
- Family Limitation and the Church and Birth Control. New York: Paulist Press, 1916.
- Catholic Church vs. Socialism. New York: The Mail and Express Co., 1918.
- Problems of the Peace Conference. New York: American Press, 1918.
- Bishop's Program of Social Reconstruction. Washington: National Catholic Welfare Conference, 1919.
- Catholic Doctrine on the Right of Self Government. New York: Paulist Press, 1919.
- Social Reconstruction, a General Review of the Problems and Survey of Remedies. Washington: National Catholic War Council, 1919.
- Capital and Labor. Washington: National Catholic Welfare Council, 1920.
- The Denver Tramway Strike of 1920. Denver: Denver Commission of Religious Forces, 1921. (with Edward T. Devin and John A. Lapp)
- The Labor Problem: What It Is, How to Solve It. New York: Paulist Press, 1921. (With Raymond McGowan, also published under the title of A Catechism of the Social Question)
- The Christian Doctrine of Property. New York: Paulist Press, 1923.
- The Supreme Court and the Minimum Wage. New York: Paulist Press, 1923.
- Christian Charity and the Plight of Europe. New York: Paulist Press, 1924.
- The Equal Rights Amendment in Relation to Protective Legislation for Women. Washington: National Catholic Welfare Conference, 1929.
- The Proposed Child Labor Amendment. New York: National Child Labor Committee, 1924.
- A Question of Tactics for Catholic Citizens. 1924
- Industrial Democracy from a Catholic Viewpoint. Washington: Rossi-Bryn Co., 1925.
- Human Sterilization. Washington: National Catholic Welfare Conference, 1927.
- Should a Catholic be President? The Smith-Marshall Controversy. New York: Calvert Publishing Corporation, 1927.
- The Ethics of Public Utility Valuation. Washington: National Popular Government League, 1928.
- International Ethics. Washington: Catholic Association for International Peace, 1928. (with the Ethics Committee)
- Prohibition Today and Tomorrow. Washington: Catholic Charities Review, 1928.
- Supreme Court and the Minimum Wage. New York: Paulist Press, 1928.
- Prohibition and Civic Loyalty. Washington: (self-published), 1929.
- Unemployment. Washington. National Catholic Welfare Conference, 1929.
- The Vatican–Italian Accord. New York: Foreign Policy Association, 1929. (with Count Carlo Sforza and Charles C. Marshall)
- Moral Aspects of Sterilization. Washington: National Catholic Welfare Conference, 1930.
- Prohibition, Yes or No? New York: Paulist Press, 1930.
- Capital and Labor. New York: Paulist Press, 1931.
- Moral Factors in Economic Life. Washington: National Council of Catholic Men, 1931. (with Francis J. Haas)
- Catholic Principles and the Present Crises. Washington: Catholic Conference on Industrial Problems, 1932.
- Radical Pronouncements of Popes Leo XIII and Pius XI. Washington: National Catholic Welfare Conference, 1932.
- Some Timely Commentaries on a Great Encyclical. Washington: National Catholic Welfare Conference, 1932.
- Attitude of the Church Toward Public Ownership. New York: Public Ownership League, 1932.
- The Catholic Teaching on Our Industrial System. Washington: National Catholic Welfare Conference, 1934.
- International Economic Life. Washington: Catholic Association for International Peace, 1934. (with Parker T. Moom and Raymond A. McGowan)
- Organized Social Justice. New York: Paulist Press, 1934.
- Shall the NRA Be Scrapped? Washington: Catholic Conference on Industrial Problems, 1934.
- Social Justice in the 1935 Congress. Washington: National Catholic Welfare Conference, 1935.
- Human Sterilization. Washington: National Catholic Welfare Conference, 1936.
- Message of the Encyclicals for America Today. Washington: National Catholic Welfare Conference, 1936.
- Roosevelt Safeguards America. New York: Democratic National Committee, 1936.
- The Constitution and Catholic Industrial Teaching. New York: Paulist Press, 1937.
- The Church, the State and Unemployment. Washington: Government Printing Office, 1938.
- The Present Business Recession. Washington: Government Printing Office, 1938.
- Relation of Catholicism to Fascism, Communism, and Democracy. Washington: National Catholic Welfare Conference, 1938.
- Bishop's Program of Social Reconstruction, a General Review of the Problems and Survey for Social Reconstruction. Washington: Government Printing Office, 1939.
- Citizen, the Church, and the State. New York: Paulist Press, 1939.
- Testimonial Dinner. Washington: Catholic Conference on Industrial Problems, 1939.
- Can Unemployment Be Ended? Washington: American Association for Economic Freedom, 1940.
- Defense for America. New York: Macmillan, 1940.
- Obligation of Catholics to Promote Peace. Washington: Catholic Association of International Peace, 1940.
- Report of the Interfaith Conference on Unemployment. Washington: National Catholic Welfare Conference, 1940.
- The Right and Wrong of War. Washington: (privately published), 1940.
- American Democracy vs. Racism, Communism. New York Paulist Press, 1941.
- The Enemy Is Hitler. South Bend, Indiana: Fight For Freedom Committee, 1941.
- The World Society, a Joint Report. New York: Paulist Press, 1941.
- International Post War Reconstruction. Washington: National Catholic Welfare Conference, 1942.
- Original Sin and Human Misery. New York: Paulist Press, 1942.
- A Suggested Limitation of Capitalist Property. Dublin: Catholic Truth Society of Ireland, 1946.

== See also ==
- Catholic moral theology
