= Zeta Tau Alpha =

International women's collegiate fraternity

- ΖΤΑ
- Founded: October 15, 1898; 127 years ago State Female Normal School
- Type: Social
- Affiliation: NPC
- Status: Active
- Scope: International
- Motto: "Seek the Noblest"
- Pillars: Lifelong Learning, Leadership, Responsibility, Being Rather than Seeming, Service & Philanthropy, Seeking Understanding that We Might Gain True Wisdom, Humility, Loyalty & Commitment, and Love
- Member badge
- Colors: Turquoise blue and Steel gray
- Symbol: Five-pointed Crown (primary); Strawberry (secondary)
- Flower: White violet
- Patron Greek deity: Themis
- Publication: Themis
- Philanthropy: Breast cancer education and awareness
- Chapters: 174 active collegiate 233 alumnae
- Members: 300,000 lifetime
- Nickname: Zeta
- Headquarters: 1036 S. Rangeline Road; Carmel, Indiana 46032; United States
- Website: www.zetataualpha.org

Zeta Tau Alpha (ΖΤΑ), also known as Zeta, is an international women's fraternity. It was founded in 1898 at the State Female Normal School (now Longwood University) in Farmville, Virginia. Its international office is located in Carmel, Indiana. It is a member of the National Panhellenic Conference and currently has more than 312,000 initiated members.

== History ==
Zeta Tau Alpha's women's fraternity was founded by nine students on October 15, 1898, at the State Female Normal School (now Longwood University) in Farmville, Virginia. It was the third organization founded of the "Farmville Four". In order, these are: Kappa Delta (1897), Sigma Sigma Sigma (1898), Zeta Tau Alpha (1898), and Alpha Sigma Alpha (1901).

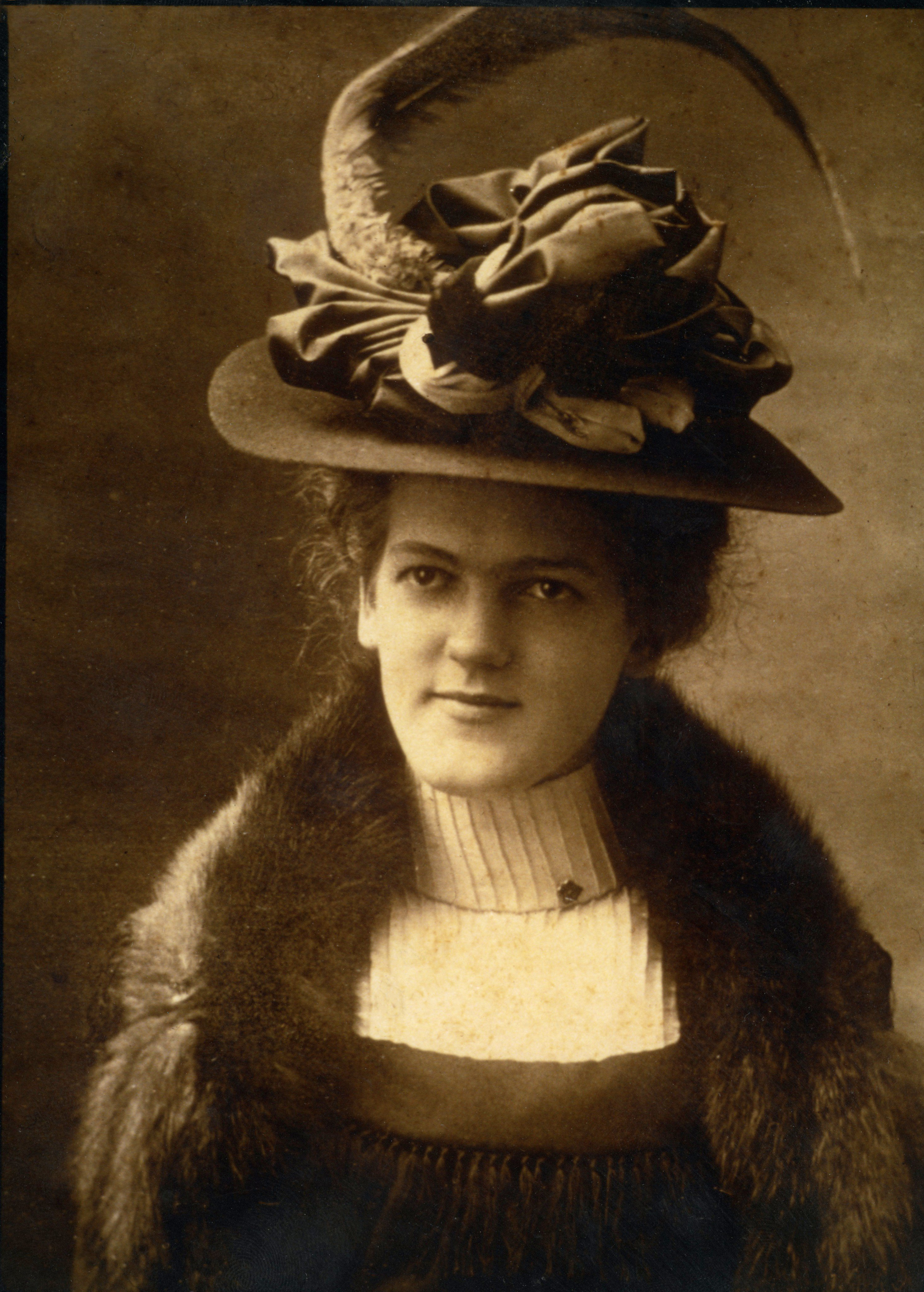
Maud Jones Horner, founding member and first president of Zeta Tau Alpha

Zeta Tau Alpha's nine founders were Maud Jones Horner, Della Lewis Hundley, Alice Bland Coleman, Mary Campbell Jones Batte, Alice Grey Welsh, Ethel Coleman Van Name, Helen May Crafford, Frances Yancey Smith, and Ruby Leigh Orgain.

In 1897, the founders began meeting to form an organization during their time at the college to cement the bonds of their friend group, which at the time, numbered at "a dozen". When Alice Bland Coleman was approached by another women's fraternity on campus to join, the founders pushed forward with starting the fraternity. Maud Jones Horner and Frances Yancey Smith then turned to their respective brothers, Plummer Jones (Kappa Alpha Order and Phi Beta Kappa) and Giles Mebane Smith (Phi Theta Psi and Phi Beta Kappa), as resources of information regarding the fraternity system. At this time, the fraternity went by its original moniker, "???" (pronounced "Who, Who, Who?") which was used during its first interactions with the two other women's fraternities at Longwood. In the spring of 1899, the Greek letter name "Zeta Tau Alpha" was selected.

In 1902, member Grace Elcan Garnett, attained a charter for Zeta Tau Alpha from the State of Virginia, cementing its official purpose: "The object of said association shall be to intensify friendship, promote happiness among its members, and in every way to create such sentiments; to perform such deeds, and to mould such opinions as will conduce to the building up of a nobler and purer womanhood in the world." Zeta Tau Alpha was the first women's fraternity to receive a charter by a special act of the Virginia legislature.

In 1903, the first national convention was held in Farmville and it was here that the name of the fraternity's official publication Themis was decided. It was also at this convention that Zeta Tau Alpha officially adopted the term "fraternity" instead of "sorority" to distinguish the organization from those directly affiliated with men's fraternities. In 1907, Zeta Tau Alpha had 176 active members and 300 total initiates from eight chapters. It also had an alumnae association. In 1909, the organization joined the National Panhellenic Conference (NPC), an umbrella organization consisting of women's fraternities and sororities, to expand. This resulted in the first closure of its Alpha chapter at Longwood University.

In 1954, Zeta Tau Alpha established the Zeta Tau Alpha Foundation. The foundation is a non-profit organization devoted to funding scholarships for sisters, providing educational programming, and supporting the fraternity's national philanthropy which is breast cancer education and awareness. Zeta Tau Alpha Housing Corporation was founded in 1974. The organization manages official chapter facilities.

== Symbols ==
=== Badge ===
The Zeta Tau Alpha's member badge is a small black shield superimposed on a gold or silver shield bearing the Greek letters "ΖΤΑ", a five-pointed crown, and the name Themis in Greek. Designed with the help of Mebane Smith, Maud Jones Horner, Frances Yancey Smith, and Mary Campbell Jones Batte chose the final design. It may be enhanced with jewels and pearls surrounding the shield to indicate office or years of service. The size was regulated at the 1912 convention to be modeled after that of Dr. May Agnes Hopkins, the fraternity's national president at the time. Members may wear a chapter guard and attach dangles to denote achievements and positions held as within the fraternity. The chapter guard is the only pin allowed to be attached to the badge and the badge may not be turned into jewelry or set with more than two stones. The fraternity has no official jewel or gemstone.

New members may wear a turquoise and silver carpenter square pin, which was adopted as the new member pin in the 1910 National Convention. The new member pin is returned upon initiation. Members may also wear a recognition pin in the shape of a small, gold five-pointed crown on their coat as the badge. "While not a rule," it was deemed that it was "a matter of good taste" that a member never wear the official badge on a coat.

In recognition of outstanding service to the fraternity, members can receive an honor ring that bears the coat of arms on a turquoise stone. Adopted at the 1915 national convention, the oblong-octagonal ring also bears an open book and a five-pointed crown in relief on the sides. It is considered Zeta Tau Alpha's highest individual honor for alumnae.

For major anniversaries, members receive additional pins and charms to commemorate 25, 50, and 75 years as a Zeta. After 25 years, members receive the 25-year pin. Fifty-year members receive the white violet pin, and 75-year members receive a white violet charm.

=== Insignia ===
Zeta Tau Alpha's coat of arms in use today was adopted in 1926 and follows heraldic rules. It is described as: "Quarterly argent and azure; in two and three a cinquefoil of the first; nine billets in bend sable. Crest: Above a crown (radiate) or, a chain of five links fess-wise argent. Motto: Zeta Tau Alpha in Greek upper and lower case." Only initiated members may use the crest in any manner, which must be dignified and in good taste. The secret, ritualistic meaning of the coat of arms is revealed to each member during her Initiation.

The fraternity's banner was introduced at the 1910 national convention and was designed by Bertha Cruse Gardner as a commission from the national president. The turquoise and gray satin banner bears the Greek letter "A", the name "Themis", and a burning torch. The banner's meaning is secret, but it may be hung in a visible place in chapter housing.

=== Colors ===
Zeta Tau Alpha's colors are turquoise blue and steel gray. Upon receiving a bid to the fraternity, members receive a set of turquoise and blue ribbons adorned on a pin to wear before receiving the new member pin. Members also wear the colors in honor of significant events such as the installation of a new chapter, Founder's Day celebrations, or the death of a member. The significance of these colors is explained to new members during the initiation service.

=== Symbols ===
Zeta Tau Alpha's flower is the white violet, chosen by Ruby Leigh Orgain for its connection to the ancient Greeks as well as the prevalence of such flowers in Virginia. While the specific varietal of violet is not named, depictions of the flower show that it is based on the Viola canadensis which is native to Virginia.

The five-pointed crown is the primary official symbol of the fraternity. The meaning of the crown is revealed to members during the initiation service and members may use either the official logo crown or the crown used on the coat of arms. The strawberry is also used as a secondary symbol. The strawberry's significance originated from a gift of a basket of strawberries to member Mary Campbell Jones Batte. Through that gift, the founders resolved to host their first social gathering and become recognized on campus.

In addition, the founders chose Themis as their patron goddess to represent the fraternity. In Greek tradition, Themis represents "divine justice" and was seated beside Zeus to give counsel and gather assemblies. She also served as an Oracle of Delphi. In addition to being a wife of Zeus, she was the daughter of Uranus and Gaea and the mother of the Horae and the Moirai. In some depictions, she is the mother of Prometheus. She is often depicted holding a sword of justice and the scales of law.

=== Publication ===
Themis is the name of the fraternity's publication, first published in 1903.

=== Creed and pillars ===
Written by Shirley Kreasan Strout and adopted at the 1928 national convention, the creed of Zeta Tau Alpha is the embodiment of the organization's values. Per tradition, every chapter meeting of Zeta Tau Alpha opens with members reciting the creed together.

To realize that within our grasp, in Zeta Tau Alpha, lies the opportunity to learn those things which will ever enrich and ennoble our lives; to be true to ourselves and to those within and without our circle;

To think in terms of all mankind and our service in the world;

To be steadfast, strong, and clean of heart and mind, remembering that since the thought is father to the deed, only that which we would have manifested in our experience should be entertained in thought;

To find satisfaction in being, rather than seeming, thus strengthening in us the higher qualities of the spirit;

To prepare for service and learn the nobility of serving, thereby earning the right to be served; to seek understanding that we might gain true wisdom; to look for the good in everyone;

To see beauty, with its enriching influence; to be humble in success, and without bitterness in defeat;

To have the welfare and harmony of the Fraternity at heart, striving ever to make our lives a symphony of high ideals, devotion to the Right, the Good, and the True, without a discordant note; remembering always that the foundation precept of Zeta Tau Alpha was Love, "the greatest of all things". - Shirley Kreasan Strout

The creed was the basis for establishing "The Nine Key Values" or pillars of Zeta Tau Alpha, which are Lifelong Learning, Leadership, Responsibility, Being Rather than Seeming, Service & Philanthropy, Seeking Understanding that We Might Gain True Wisdom, Humility, Loyalty & Commitment, and Love.

== Chapters ==
Zeta Tau Alpha has 174 active collegiate chapters and 233 active alumnae chapters. There are alumnae chapters across the United States, Canada, and a virtual alumnae chapter, ZTAlways. ZTAlways is a virtual alumnae chapter for members who do not have the opportunity to interact with sisters among a land-based chapter. As an alumna, a woman is still considered a member of the fraternity.

== Philanthropy ==
In 1928, Zeta Tau Alpha started its first national philanthropic effort in the creation of a health center servicing the community of Currin Valley, located in Appalachian Virginia. When the health center closed in 1946, Zeta Tau Alpha partnered with the Easterseals until 1970 and the ARC until 1992. During the partnership with the Easterseals, the Zeta Tau Alpha Foundation (known as the ΖΤΑ Foundation) was established in 1954.

In 1992, the fraternity adopted breast cancer education and awareness as its national philanthropy and partnered with the Susan G. Komen Breast Cancer Foundation until 2015. Zeta Tau Alpha trademarked the phrase "Think Pink" with the United States Patent and Trademark Office, and uses this term as the umbrella for all of their breast cancer education and awareness projects.

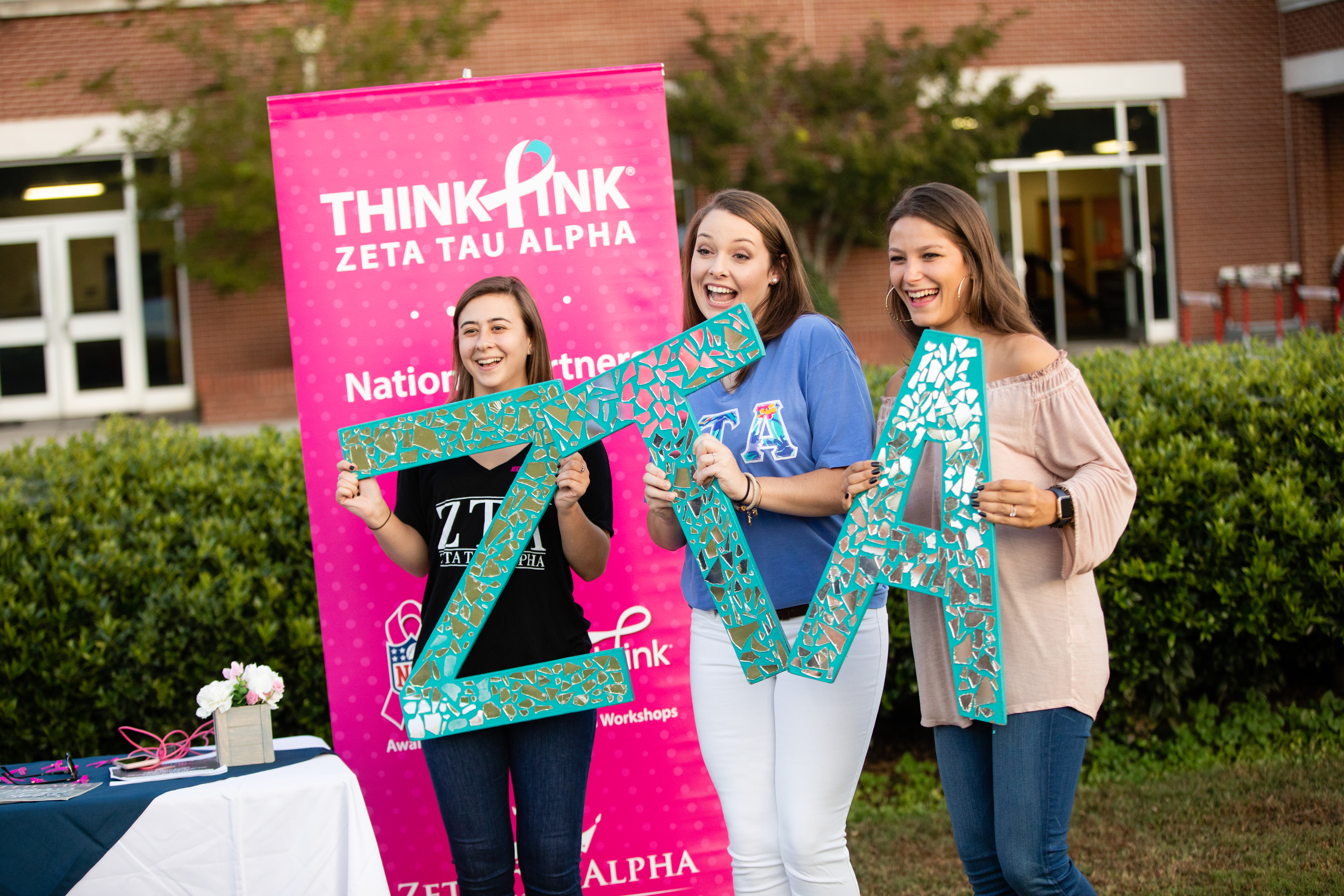
Zeta Tau Alpha sisters involved in a "Think Pink" campaign

The Zeta Tau Alpha Foundation currently has partnerships with the American Cancer Society, in which the foundation is the National Survivor Ambassador of Making Strides Against Breast Cancer; the National Football League (partnership established in 1999), for which the foundation distributes pink ribbons as part of the NFL's "A Crucial Catch" campaign; and Bright Pink, in which the Brighten Up Educational Workshop is brought to each collegiate chapter's campus to provide to tools for assessing breast cancer risk.

=== Programming ===
The Zeta Tau Alpha Foundation also develops programming geared toward college students covering topics such as mental health, substance abuse, and leadership development. Such programs are referred to "My Sister, My Responsibility" and contain content emphasizing social responsibility, duty of care, and engaging conversations about risk.

Zeta Tau Alpha is a member of the Harm Reduction Alliance, a group that collaborates on providing programming to college students. In response to the COVID-19 pandemic, the foundation provided Grace Grants to Zeta Tau Alpha members of experiencing hardship. "Grace" refers both to the act of grace given to each other as members and to Grace Estelle Elcan, one of the fraternity's first new members.

Chapter officers for both collegiate and alumnae groups are also given leadership training by the fraternity. Chapter officers can attend either the Emerging Leaders Academy and the Officers' Leadership Academy which allow members to learn more about their specific officer roles.

The fraternity's national convention occurs every two years and brings together chapter members and alumni from around the country. In 2024, the fraternity celebrated the 125 years at their national convention in Indianapolis, Indiana.

== Membership ==
In 2021, as a result of ongoing efforts to improve diversity, equity, and inclusion in the fraternity, the national council officially eliminated the legacy policy as a factor in membership selection. Previously, a legacy was given preferential consideration during recruitment. As part of its official announcement, the fraternity said, "Removing the Legacy Policy is an important step toward providing a more equitable recruitment experience for all potential new members. It allows collegiate chapters and PNMs to focus on the mutual selection process, gives chapters full accountability for the members they select, and will ensure that non-legacy PNMs have the same access and opportunity to join."

== Governance ==
Zeta Tau Alpha is structured into three separate organizations that facilitate fraternity operations: Zeta Tau Alpha Fraternity, Zeta Tau Alpha Housing Corporation, and Zeta Tau Alpha Foundation. These organizations are each supported by volunteers working at the local and national level as well as staff based at the International Office, based in Carmel, Indiana. The foundation also provides leadership consultants to help provide direct national support for chapters during major events and for leadership development.

== Notable members ==
Zeta Tau Alpha has more than 312,000 initiated members.

== See also ==
- List of social sororities and women's fraternities
