= List of Theta Kappa Nu chapters =

Theta Kappa Nu fraternity was a collegiate fraternity founded on June 9, 1924, by the merger of eleven local fraternities. It went defunct in 1939 when it merged with Lambda Chi Alpha. In the following list of chapters, active chapters are indicated in bold and inactive chapters and institutions are in italics.

| Number | Chapter | Charter date and range | Institution | Location | Status | Ref. |
|---|---|---|---|---|---|---|
| | Alabama Alpha | October 11, 1924 – 1939 | Howard College | Birmingham, Alabama | Merged (**ΛΧΑ**) | (Note: This chapter originated as Phi Kappa Nu, a local fraternity formed on November 19, 1919.) |
| | Florida Alpha | October 11, 1924 – 1939 | Rollins College | Winter Park, Florida | Merged (**ΛΧΑ**) | (Note: This chapter formed from Tau Lambda Delta, a local fraternity established on October 21, 1921.) (Note: Became the Theta-Gamma chapter of Lambda Chi Alpha.) |
| | Florida Beta | October 11, 1924 – 1937 | University of Florida | Gainesville, Florida | Inactive | (Note: This chapter originated as the second chapter of Tau Lambda Delta, established on March 20, 1923.) |
| | Indiana Alpha | October 11, 1924 – 1939 | Hanover College | Hanover, Indiana | Merged (**ΛΧΑ**) | (Note: This chapter originated as Kappa Kappa Kappa, a local fraternity formed in October 1919. Kappa Kappa Kappa formed from the Barbaric Union, established in 1916 from the Help Yourself Club that was established in 1912.) (Note: Became the Theta-Zeta chapter of Lambda Chi Alpha.) |
| | Iowa Alpha | October 11, 1924 – 1939 | Iowa Wesleyan College | Mount Pleasant, Iowa | Merged (**ΛΧΑ**) | (Note: This chapter formed from Kappa Delta Psi, a local fraternity established on April 24, 1917.) (Note: Became the Theta-Iota chapter of Lambda Chi Alpha.) |
| | Iowa Beta | October 11, 1924 – 1939 | Simpson College | Indianola, Iowa | Merged (**ΛΧΑ**) | (Note: The chapter formed from Sigma Delta Chi, a local fraternity established on March 19, 1920.) (Note: Became the Theta-Lambda chapter of Lambda Chi Alpha.) |
| | Kansas Alpha | October 11, 1924 – 1932 | Baker University | Baldwin City, Kansas | Inactive | (Note: This chapter originated as Phi Beta Omega, a local fraternity formed on December 6, 1921. Phi Beta Omega was formed from the Celts Club, established in May 1920.) |
| | Missouri Alpha | October 11, 1924 – 1939 | Drury College | Springfield, Missouri | Merged (**ΛΧΑ**) | (Note: This chapter originated as Phi Alpha Sigma, a local fraternity formed on November 4, 1910.) (Note: Became the Theta-Sigma chapter of Lambda Chi Alpha.) |
| | North Carolina Alpha | October 11, 1924 – 1939 | North Carolina State College | Raleigh, North Carolina | Merged (**ΛΧΑ**) | (Note: This chapter originated as the third chapter of Tau Lambda Delta, established in April 1924 from The Bat which was formed in 1923.) (Note: Merged with the Gamma-Upsilon chapter of Lambda Chi Alpha.) |
| | Oklahoma Alpha | October 11, 1924 – 1939 | Oklahoma City College | Oklahoma City, Oklahoma | Merged (**ΛΧΑ**) | (Note: This chapter originated as Kappa Phi, a local fraternity formed on October 15, 1907.) (Note: Became the Theta-Delta chapter of Lambda Chi Alpha.) |
| | Pennsylvania Alpha | October 11, 1924 – 1939 | Gettysburg College | Gettysburg, Pennsylvania | Merged (**ΛΧΑ**) | (Note: This chapter originated as Phi Sigma, a local fraternity formed on May 30, 1916.) (Note: Became the Theta-Pi chapter of Lambda Chi Alpha.) |
| 12 | Missouri Beta | October 6, 1924 – 1931 | Westminster College | Fulton, Missouri | Inactive | (Note: Chapter formed from Lambda Chi, established April 24, 1924.) (Note: This chapter originated as Lambda Chi, a local fraternity formed in 1923. Name similarity appears coincidental.) |
| 13 | Alabama Beta | December 16, 1924 – 1939 | Birmingham-Southern College | Birmingham, Alabama | Merged (**ΛΧΑ**) | (Note: Formed from Phi Delta Sigma, established March 26, 1923.) (Note: Became the Theta-Mu chapter of Lambda Chi Alpha.) |
| 14 | North Carolina Beta | December 16, 1924 – 1939 | Wake Forest College | Wake Forest, North Carolina | Merged (**ΛΧΑ**) | (Note: Chapter formed from Theta Pi, established in April 1923.) (Note: Became the Theta-Tau chapter of Lambda Chi Alpha.) |
| 15 | Mississippi Alpha | December 20, 1924 – 1939 | Millsaps College | Jackson, Mississippi | Merged (**ΛΧΑ**) | (Note: Chapter formed from Alpha Theta Chi, established on January 21, 1920.) (Note: Became the Theta-Eta chapter of Lambda Chi Alpha.) |
| 16 | Massachusetts Alpha | January 23, 1925 – 1939 | Clark University | Worcester, Massachusetts | Merged (**ΛΧΑ**) | (Note: Chapter formed from Locridion, established in 1909. Later, the chapter absorbed Alpha Sigma Alpha.) (Note: Became the Theta-Eta chapter of Lambda Chi Alpha.) |
| 17 | New York Alpha | January 24, 1925 – 1939 | Polytechnic Institute of Brooklyn | Brooklyn, New York | Merged (**ΛΧΑ**) | (Note: Chapter formed from Theta Lambda, established on May 6, 1920.) (Note: Became the Theta-Upsilon chapter of Lambda Chi Alpha.) |
| 18 | Pennsylvania Beta | March 7, 1925 – 1939 | Thiel College | Greenville, Pennsylvania | Merged (**ΛΧΑ**) | (Note: This chapter originated as Alpha Delta Mu, a local fraternity formed in 1908.) (Note: Became the Theta-Xi chapter of Lambda Chi Alpha.) |
| 19 | Illinois Alpha | March 12, 1925 – 1939 | Eureka College | Eureka, Illinois | Merged (**ΛΧΑ**) | (Note: Chapter formed from Kappa Sigma Phi, established on December 10, 1914.) (Note: Became the Theta-Chi chapter of Lambda Chi Alpha.) |
| 20 | Indiana Beta | March 12, 1925 – 1935 | DePauw University | Greencastle, Indiana | Inactive | (Note: Chapter formed from Alpha Nu Delta, established on February 22, 1924.) |
| 21 | Indiana Gamma | March 28, 1925 – 1939 | Rose Polytechnic Institute | Terre Haute, Indiana | Merged (**ΛΧΑ**) | (Note: This chapter formed from the P.I.E.S. Club, a local fraternity formed on October 30, 1900.) (Note: Became the Theta-Kappa chapter of Lambda Chi Alpha.) |
| 22 | Louisiana Alpha | March 30, 1925 – 1939 | Louisiana State University | Baton Rouge, Louisiana | Merged (**ΛΧΑ**) | (Note: Chapter formed from Gamma Phi, established on April 5, 1924.) (Note: Merged with the Upsilon chapter of Lambda Chi Alpha.) |
| 23 | Louisiana Beta | March 31, 1925 – 1939 | Centenary College | Shreveport, Louisiana | Merged (**ΛΧΑ**) | (Note: Chapter formed from Omicron Lambda, established on February 20, 1923.) (Note: Became the Theta-Rho chapter of Lambda Chi Alpha.) |
| 24 | Louisiana Gamma | April 1, 1925 – 1939 | Louisiana Polytechnic Institute | Ruston | Merged (**ΛΧΑ**) | (Note: This chapter originated as Zeta Alpha Kappa, a local fraternity formed in 1902.) (Note: Became the Theta-Psi chapter of Lambda Chi Alpha.) |
| 25 | Ohio Alpha | March 26, 1925 – 1939 | Marietta College | Marietta, Ohio | Merged (**ΛΧΑ**) | (Note: Chapter formed from Tau Sigma Tau, established on December 6, 1920.) (Note: Became the Kappa-Alpha chapter of Lambda Chi Alpha.) |
| 26 | Indiana Delta | April 25, 1925 – 1932 | Franklin College | Franklin, Indiana | Inactive | (Note: Chapter formed from Delta Chi Omicron, established in October 1922.) (Note: Became the Theta-Eta chapter of Lambda Chi Alpha.) |
| 27 | North Carolina Gamma | May 7, 1925 – 1939 | University of North Carolina | Chapel Hill, North Carolina | Merged (**ΛΧΑ**) | (Note: Chapter formed from Delta Pi, established on February 1, 1924.) (Note: Merged with the Gamma-Nu chapter of Lambda Chi Alpha.) |
| 28 | Pennsylvania Gamma | 1925–1931 | Washington & Jefferson College | Washington, Pennsylvania | Inactive | (Note: Chapter formed from Sigma Omega Pi, established on January 9, 1924.) |
| 29 | Minnesota Alpha | June 13, 1925 – 1933 | University of Minnesota | Minneapolis, Minnesota | Inactive | (Note: Chapter formed from Mu Delta Phi, established on February 16, 1925. Mu Delta Phi was formed from the Mandarin Club, established in 1923.) |
| 30 | Michigan Alpha | September 25, 1925 – 1939 | University of Michigan | Ann Arbor, Michigan | Merged (**ΛΧΑ**) | (Note: Chapter formed from Kappa Epsilon Pi, established in the fall of 1924. Kappa Epsilon Pi was originally called The Wayfarers, established on September 21, 1920.) (Note: Merged with the Sigma chapter of Lambda Chi Alpha.) |
| 31 | Georgia Alpha | October 5, 1925 – 1934 | Oglethorpe University | Atlanta, Georgia | Inactive | (Note: Chapter formed from Delta Chi Epsilon, established on December 1, 1923.) |
| 32 | New York Beta | November 7, 1925 – 1939 | Alfred University | Alfred, New York | Merged (**ΛΧΑ**) | (Note: Chapter formed from Eta Phi Gamma, established in 1911 from The White Owls which formed in 1910.) (Note: Became the Kappa-Sigma chapter of Lambda Chi Alpha.) |
| 33 | Ohio Beta | February 19, 1926 – 1939 | Baldwin-Wallace College | Berea, Ohio | Merged (**ΛΧΑ**) | (Note: Chapter formed from Sigma Phi, established in 1919 from Schiller Society which formed in 1868.) (Note: Became the Kappa-Phi chapter of Lambda Chi Alpha.) |
| 34 | Illinois Beta | March 13, 1926 – 1939 | University of Illinois | Champaign, Illinois | Merged (**ΛΧΑ**) | (Note: Chapter was formed Beta Lambda, established on May 5, 1921, which formed from Beaver Lodge, established in the spring of 1920.) (Note: Merged with the Chi chapter of Lambda Chi Alpha.) |
| 35 | Alabama Gamma | April 24, 1926 – 1939 | Auburn University | Auburn, Alabama | Merged (**ΛΧΑ**) | (Note: Chapter formed from Sigma Kappa Nu, established on April 23, 1924.) (Note: Merged with the Omega chapter of Lambda Chi Alpha.) |
| 36 | South Carolina Alpha | 1926–1939 | Wofford College | Spartanburg, South Carolina | Merged (**ΛΧΑ**) | (Note: Chapter formed from Alpha Phi (local), established on October 1, 1923.) (Note: Became the Kappa-Omicron chapter of Lambda Chi Alpha.) |
| 37 | Missouri Gamma | May 22, 1926 – 1939 | Culver-Stockton College | Canton, Missouri | Merged (**ΛΧΑ**) | (Note: This originated as Alpha Delta Theta, a local fraternity formed in 1915 from the Hawkins Literary Institute that was established in 1867.) (Note: Became the Kappa-Mu chapter of Lambda Chi Alpha.) |
| 38 | Virginia Alpha | 1926–1939 | Randolph-Macon College | Ashland, Virginia | Merged (**ΛΧΑ**) | (Note: Chapter formed from Alpha Phi Epsilon, established on April 21, 1923, from Sigma Phi Mu (established December 14, 1922).) (Note: Became the Kappa-Tau chapter of Lambda Chi Alpha.) |
| 39 | Virginia Beta | 1926–1939 | Hampden–Sydney College | Hampden Sydney, Virginia | Merged (**ΛΧΑ**) | (Note: Chapter formed from Epsilon Alpha (local), established on November 30, 1921.) (Note: Became the Kappa-Eta chapter of Lambda Chi Alpha.) |
| 40 | Arkansas Alpha | June 11, 1926 – 1939 | University of Arkansas | Fayetteville, Arkansas | Merged (**ΛΧΑ**) | (Note: Chapter formed from Tau Alpha Pi, established on November 15, 1923.) (Note: Merged with the Gamma-Chi chapter of Lambda Chi Alpha.) |
| 41 | Illinois Gamma | May 28, 1927 – 1939 | Bradley Polytechnic Institute | Peoria, Illinois | Merged (**ΛΧΑ**) | (Note: Chapter formed from The Sophist Clus, established on September 28, 1916.) (Note: Became the Kappa-Upsilon chapter of Lambda Chi Alpha.) |
| 42 | Pennsylvania Delta | 1927–1931 | University of Pittsburgh | Pittsburgh, Pennsylvania | Inactive | (Note: Chapter formed from Delta Xi Omega, established in the fall of 1923.) |
| 43 | California Alpha | March 31, 1928 – 1939 | University of California | Berkeley, California | Merged (**ΛΧΑ**) | (Note: Chapter formed as Achaen Club, established on August 12, 1912.) (Note: Merged with the Mu chapter of Lambda Chi Alpha.) |
| 44 | Kentucky Alpha | May 19, 1928 – 1939 | Georgetown College | Georgetown, Kentucky | Merged (**ΛΧΑ**) | (Note: Chapter formed from Gamma Tau Alpha, established November 28, 1924. Gamma Tau Alpha formed from Q. T. Club, established on October 8, 1924.) (Note: Became the Kappa-Omega chapter of Lambda Chi Alpha.) |
| 45 | Maine Alpha | 1929–1939 | Colby College | Waterville, Maine | Merged (**ΛΧΑ**) | (Note: Chapter formed from the Lancers Club, established on October 31, 1923.) (Note: Merged with the Alpha-Rho chapter of Lambda Chi Alpha.) |
| 46 | Oregon Alpha | May 17, 1930 – 1933; 1934–1939 | Oregon State University | Corvallis, Oregon | Merged (**ΛΧΑ**) | (Note: Chapter formed from Psi Chi, established on November 17, 1922, from Ares which formed in January 1921.) (Note: Merged with the Alpha-Lambda chapter of Lambda Chi Alpha.) |
| 47 | Michigan Beta | May 24, 1930 – 1938 | Michigan State College | East Lansing, Michigan | Inactive | (Note: Chapter formed from Ulyssian Literary Society, established on October 12, 1922.) |
| 48 | Idaho Alpha | 1930–1937 | College of Idaho | Caldwell, Idaho | Withdrew | (Note: This chapter formed from Beta Chi, a local formed in 1921. It reverted to local status at the time of the merger.) |
| 49 | Wisconsin Alpha | 1931–1934 | University of Wisconsin | Madison, Wisconsin | Inactive | |
| 50 | New York Gamma | 1931–1939 | Cornell University | Ithaca, New York | Merged (**ΛΧΑ**) | (Note: Merged with the Omicron chapter of Lambda Chi Alpha.) |
| 51 | Pennsylvania Epsilon | 1931–1938 | Muhlenberg College | Allentown, Pennsylvania | Inactive | |
| 52 | Ohio Gamma | 1932–1939 | Wittenberg University | Springfield, Ohio | Merged (**ΛΧΑ**) | (Note: Became the Nu-Zeta chapter of Lambda Chi Alpha.) |
| 53 | Texas Alpha | 1932–1939 | Southern Methodist University | Dallas, Texas | Merged (**ΛΧΑ**) | (Note: Merged with the Gamma-Sigma chapter of Lambda Chi Alpha.) |
| 54 | Maryland Alpha | 1935 | Washington College | Chestertown, Maryland | Withdrew | (Note: This chapter originated as a local called Phi Sigma Phi, formed in 1928. The college administration did not allow it to merge with the local Lambda Chi Alpha chapter. Instead, it briefly reverted to local status and chartered as the Beta-Eta chapter of the Theta Chi fraternity in 1940.) |
| 55 | Mississippi Beta | 1939–1939 | Mississippi State College | Starkville, Mississippi | Merged (**ΛΧΑ**) | (Note: Merged with the Epsilon-Chi chapter of Lambda Chi Alpha.) |
