= Delta Psi Delta =

Delta Psi Delta may refer to:

- Delta Psi Delta (sorority), a Canadian sorority
- Delta Psi Delta (Linfield University), a local fraternity at Linfield University
- Delta Psi Delta (Dartmouth), a defunct coed fraternity at Dartmouth College
