= Phi Kappa Nu =

Social fraternity at Samford University, Alabama, US (1919–1924)

- ΦΚΝ
- Founded: 1919; 107 years ago Howard College
- Type: Social
- Affiliation: Independent
- Status: Merged
- Merge date: 1924
- Successor: Theta Kappa Nu
- Scope: Local
- Colors: Gold and Black
- Symbol: Three Φs
- Flower: Pink Rose
- Chapters: 1
- Headquarters: Birmingham, Alabama; United States

Phi Kappa Nu (ΦΚΝ) was a local fraternity on the campus of Howard College (now Samford University) in Birmingham, Alabama, United States. Through mergers, it helped establish Theta Kappa Nu, which later joined Lambda Chi Alpha.

== History ==
=== Founding ===
Phi Kappa Nu was created in 1919 when six men with similar ideas and morals came together at Howard and formed a local fraternity. The Founders were:

- George A. Neely
- James J. Bell
- Bolivar B. O'Rear
- Walter G. Pledger
- Dewey H. McMeans
- J. Ford Robinson

Neely was credited with writing the ritual, and Robinson was credited with designing the badge.

=== Theta Kappa Nu ===
In 1924, five years after its founding, Phi Kappa Nu joined with ten other local fraternities across the country to form the new national fraternity Theta Kappa Nu. This merger would take place in Springfield, Missouri at Drury College, the site of Missouri Alpha’s chapter house. This was an odd location because it was not centralized in respect to the other 10 chapters. Howard's Phi Kappa Nu was designated the Alabama Alpha chapter of Theta Kappa Nu. Neely's ritual was adopted by the new national fraternity. The Phi Kappa Nu badge was slightly modified to reflect new letters, but its design was adopted as the Theta Kappa Nu badge.

The new national fraternity with roots at Howard then embarked on a period where it was called the nation's fastest growing fraternity, chartering more than 40 chapters within its first two years.

=== Lambda Chi Alpha merger ===
Theta Kappa Nu merged with Lambda Chi Alpha in 1939 in what was known then as the largest fraternity merger in history. The Howard chapter again played a significant role, as the signing of the official merger document was hosted at Howard college’s Alabama Alpha chapter in East Lake, Alabama, a neighborhood of Birmingham. Chapters of ΘΚΝ were given new chapter designations: the Howard chapter then became the Theta Alpha Zeta chapter of Lambda Chi Alpha. This chapter designation, first among the new chapters, signified the Howard chapter's significant role in Theta Kappa Nu, and in shepherding Theta Kappa Nu chapters toward merger. Again, the badge that originated at Howard as Phi Kappa Nu’s badge became the basis of the revised Lambda Chi Associate Pin, and Neely's ritual became the basis of the Lambda Chi associate member ceremony.

== Symbols ==
Phi Kappa Nu's colors were gold and black. Its flower was the pink rose. Its symbols was three Φs

== See also ==
- Theta Kappa Nu
- Lambda Chi Alpha
