= List of Zeta Psi chapters =

Zeta Psi is an international collegiate fraternity. It was founded in 1847 at New York University in New York City, New York.

Each Zeta Psi chapter has a unique name composed of one or two Greek letters. A colony petitioning Zeta Psi to become a chapter chooses a name for its chapter upon receiving its charter. From this point on, the name is fixed. Even if the chapter goes inactive, the name will be reused by any group that re-establishes a chapter at the university campus. A chapter name can only be reassigned to another institution if the chapter possessing the name is pronounced "deceased"; this has not happened since 1892.

The chapter's name can be based on many different factors. For instance, it is common for new chapters to take on an element from an existing chapter that has helped them form. Theta Xi chapter in Toronto adopted the Xi from their neighbor chapter in Michigan. In turn, every chapter in Ontario has a "Theta" as part of their name from their relationship to the Toronto chapter. Other times, a name is related to other factors like the Roman Catholic Villanova University chapter being named Alpha Omega chapter due to the Christian significance.

In the following list, active chapters are indicated in bold and inactive chapters and institutions are in italics.

Chapter	Charter date and range	Institution	Location	Status	Ref.
**Phi**	June 1, 1847 – 1971; 1975	New York University	New York City, New York	Active	
Zeta	May 23, 1848 – July 22, 1852; November 21, 1881 – 1972	Williams College	Williamstown, Massachusetts	Inactive	
**Delta**	November 24, 1848 – 2009; 2011–2014; 2019	Rutgers University–New Brunswick	New Brunswick, New Jersey	Active	
Omicron Prime (See **Omicron Epsilon**)	June 3, 1850 – January 4, 1882	Princeton University	Princeton, New Jersey	Deceased	(Note: Renamed Omicron Epsilon chapter on the same campus after the long dormancy.)
**Sigma**	September 4, 1850	University of Pennsylvania	Philadelphia, Pennsylvania	Active	
Chi	November 19, 1850 – 1988	Colby College	Waterville, Maine	Inactive	(Note: This chapter originated as Alpha Omega (local) in 1849.) (Note: Greek letter organizations are banned at Colby.)
Epsilon	April 21, 1852 – 1861; 1864–1987	Brown University	Providence, Rhode Island	Inactive	(Note: The former Epsilon chapter of Zeta Psi went co-ed, renaming itself Zeta Delta Xi on January 24, 1987.)
Rho Prime	July 12, 1852 – 1857; May 25, 1865 – 1867; February 17, 1882 – December 1892; 1985–1998	Harvard University	Cambridge, Massachusetts	Deceased	
Alpha Prime	March 5, 1852 – 1856	Dickinson College	Carlisle, Pennsylvania	Deceased	
Psi Prime (See **Psi Epsilon**)	November 19, 1853 – 1864	Dartmouth College	Hanover, New Hampshire	Deceased	
**Kappa**	October 22, 1855	Tufts University	Medford, Massachusetts	Active	
Theta Prime	March 4, 1856 – 1871	Union College	Schenectady, New York	Deceased	(Note: Chapter closed due to the loss of its members in the Civil War.)
**Tau**	October 2, 1857 – 2014; 2020	Lafayette College	Easton, Pennsylvania	Active	
Beta Prime (See Xi)	1858–c. 1861	University of Michigan	Ann Arbor, Michigan	Deceased	(Note: At the beginning of the Civil War, all but two of Michigan's Beta chapter active members left campus to enlist in the Union or Confederate armies. The brotherhood in Ann Arbor was subsequently reorganized under a new name with the chartering of the Xi chapter in 1861 and morally supported by the efforts of Elders Lewis Pilcher and James F. Spalding. However, this new Xi chapter's founding is officially recorded in Fraternity history as occurring in 1858. It was founded through the efforts of Liberty Emery Holden, a transfer from Chi chapter at Colby College. The later use of the name Beta chapter at Virginia was unrelated to the Michigan group, whose use of that name only lasted a few years.)
Pi Prime	1858–1859	Amherst College	Amherst, Massachusetts	Deceased	(Note: Greek letter organizations are banned at Amherst.) (Note: Charter "moved" to Rensselaer after Civil War.)
**Upsilon**	January 16, 1858 – 1871; December 11, 1885	University of North Carolina at Chapel Hill	Chapel Hill, North Carolina	Active	(Note: In its 1885 revival, this chapter absorbed Rho Sigma Tau (local), formed earlier that year.)
Xi (See Beta Prime)	May 20, 1858 – 1971; 1976–2002; 200x ?–2019	University of Michigan	Ann Arbor, Michigan	Inactive	(Note: Xi chapter operations suspended through end of 2021.)
Gamma Prime	1861–1865	Georgia Military Institute	Marietta, Georgia	Deceased	(Note: This school was closed after the school was destroyed during the Civil War, on November 15, 1864.) (Note: This chapter died with the Institute's demise following the Civil War.)
Eta Prime	August 13, 1861 – June 1872	Pennsylvania College	Gettysburg, Pennsylvania	Deceased	(Note: This chapter ended because of unfavorable conditions following the Battle of Gettysburg.)
Omega Prime (See **Omega Alpha**)	November 5, 1864 – December 30, 1868; 1878–1887	University of Chicago	Chicago, Illinois	Deceased	(Note: This chapter originated as the Cuardrumas Club (local), before 1864.) (Note: This chapter died along with the Old University of Chicago in 1887.)
**Pi**	January 13, 1865 – December 21, 1893; 1951	Rensselaer Polytechnic Institute	Troy, New York	Active	(Note: The charter for this chapter was moved from Amherst College after the Civil War.)
Lambda	December 27, 1867 – 1994	Bowdoin College	Brunswick, Maine	Inactive	
**Beta**	June 28, 1868 – 1881; 1893–2011; 201x ?	University of Virginia	Charlottesville, Virginia	Active	(Note: The use of the name Beta chapter at Virginia is wholly separate from that name's earlier short-term usage at Michigan.)
**Psi**	December 31, 1868	Cornell University	Ithaca, New York	Active	
**Iota**	June 10, 1870	University of California, Berkeley	Berkeley, California	Active	
**Psi Epsilon** (See Psi Prime)	May 6, 1871 – June 1873; 1920–2007; 2012	Dartmouth College	Hanover, New Hampshire	Active	(Note: In its 1919 reorganization, this chapter absorbed Delta Gamma Psi (local), formed earlier that same year.)
Gamma Second	1874–1875	United States Naval Academy	Annapolis, Maryland	Deceased	(Note: Fraternities were banned at the US Naval Academy in the late 1800's. The school only briefly had three: ΒΘΠ, ΖΨ and ΚΣ. All three were closed within a year or two of chartering, none surviving past 1887.) (Note: Closed due to "government restrictions against fraternities".)
**Gamma**	June 11, 1875 – 1887; 1905–1972; 1974–1993; 1998–2008; 2020	Syracuse University	Syracuse, New York	Active	(Note: This chapter originated on the Syracuse campus as Theta Chi (local) in 1874. No relation to the national fraternity of that same name, which only had one chapter at the time.)
Alpha (Originally Mu)	December 12, 1879 – 1936; 1981–2009	Columbia University	New York City, New York	Inactive	(Note: The chapter letter name Mu was originally given to the chapter but changed to Alpha a few years later with permission of the Grand Chapter in January 1882) (Note: The Columbia chapter was evicted from campus housing in 2007.)
**Theta Xi**	March 29, 1879	University of Toronto	Toronto, Ontario, Canada	Active	(Note: First Greek letter fraternity in Canada.)
**Alpha Psi**	January 3, 1883 – 1970; 1979	McGill University	Montreal, Quebec, Canada	Active	
**Nu**	October 27, 1884 – 2020	Case Western Reserve University	Cleveland, Ohio	Inactive	
**Eta**	May 11, 1889 – 1974; 1976	Yale University	New Haven, Connecticut	Active	
Mu	January 8, 1892 – 1963; 1975–1987; 1992–1998	Stanford University	Stanford, California	Inactive	
**Alpha Beta**	August 26, 1899 – 1982; 1987–2001; 2016	University of Minnesota	Minneapolis, Minnesota	Active	(Note: This chapter originated as the Varsity Club in 1893)
**Alpha Epsilon**	1909–1979, 1992	University of Illinois Urbana-Champaign	Urbana, Illinois	Active	
Lambda Psi	1910–1932, 1997–2008	University of Wisconsin–Madison	Madison, Wisconsin	Inactive	(Note: This chapter originated as the Algoma Club (local) in 1908. It had also absorbed Delta Sigma Pi (local), formed in 1923.)
**Phi Lambda**	1920	University of Washington	Seattle, Washington	Active	(Note: This chapter originated as Alpha Theta Epsilon (local) in 1913.)
Pi Epsilon	1921–2012	University of Manitoba	Winnipeg, Manitoba, Canada	Inactive	(Note: This chapter originated as the Hexagon Club (local) in 1919.)
Sigma Zeta	1924–1995, 2000–2009	University of California, Los Angeles	Los Angeles, California	Inactive	(Note: This chapter originated as Sigma Zeta (local) in 1919. It retained this name as a chapter designation when it merged into ΖΨ.)
**Sigma Epsilon**	1926–1971, 1978–1994, 2013	University of British Columbia	Vancouver, British Columbia, Canada	Active	(Note: This chapter originated as Phi Lambda Rho (local) before 1926.)
**Mu Theta**	1930–1994, 200x ?	University of Alberta	Edmonton, Alberta, Canada	Active	(Note: This chapter originated as the Athenian Club (local) in 1926.)
**Alpha Mu**	1938–1988, 1997–2007, 20xx ?	Dalhousie University	Halifax, Nova Scotia, Canada	Active	
Omega	1947–1971; 1977–1993	Northwestern University	Evanston, Illinois	Inactive	
**Theta Phi**	1947–1977, 19xx ?–2008, 20xx ?	University of Western Ontario	London, Ontario, Canada	Active	(Note: This chapter originated as Alpha Kappa Psi (local) in 1931.)
Rho	1956–1991	Middlebury College	Middlebury, Vermont	Inactive	(Note: This chapter originated as Phi Sigma (local) in 1955.)
**Omicron**	1958–1973, 1987	Nebraska Wesleyan University	Lincoln, Nebraska	Active	(Note: This chapter originated as the Crescent Club (local) earlier in 1958.)
Theta	1960–2012	University of Connecticut	Storrs, Connecticut	Inactive	(Note: This chapter originated as Delta Chi Delta (local) in 1952.)
**Pi Sigma**	1960–1994, 199x ?–2018, 2023	Pennsylvania State University	State College, Pennsylvania	Active	(Note: This chapter originated as Pi Sigma Upsilon (local) in 1955, and was granted its ΖΨ chapter designation in honor of the former local name.) (Note: Penn State University suspended the fraternity through June 2022.)
Omicron Sigma	1962–1970	Oregon State University	Corvallis, Oregon	Inactive	
**Chi Gamma**	1967–1975,1977–1979, 1983–2006, 2013	University of Calgary	Calgary, Alberta, Canada	Active	
**Tau Gamma**	1968	Purdue University	West Lafayette, Indiana	Active	
**Delta Chi**	1969–1971, 2010	American University	Washington, D.C.	Active	
**Pi Kappa**	1969–1998, 2008	Bloomsburg University of Pennsylvania	Bloomsburg, Pennsylvania	Active	(Note: This chapter originated as Pi Kappa Epsilon (local) in 1966, and was granted its ΖΨ chapter designation in honor of the former local name.)
Sigma Phi	1970–2016	University of Illinois at Chicago	Chicago, Illinois	Inactive	(Note: This chapter originated as Sigma Phi Omega (local) in 1967, and was granted its ΖΨ chapter designation in honor of the former local name.)
Tau Delta	1973–2002	Lehigh University	Bethlehem, Pennsylvania	Inactive	(Note: This chapter originated as Tau Delta Phi (local) in 1927, and was granted its ΖΨ chapter designation in honor of the former local name.)
**Alpha Pi**	1975	Virginia Tech	Blacksburg, Virginia	Active	(Note: This chapter originated as Alpha Pi Tau (local) in 1966, and was granted its ΖΨ chapter designation in honor of the former local name.)
Upsilon Mu	1975–2009	University of Massachusetts Amherst	Amherst, Massachusetts	Inactive	
**Phi Epsilon**	1976	University of Maryland, College Park	College Park, Maryland	Active	(Note: This chapter originated as Phi Epsilon Pi in 1960 which had gone local at the University of Maryland rather than merge with Zeta Beta Tau, and was granted its ΖΨ chapter designation in honor of the former local name.)
**Pi Tau**	1976	Worcester Polytechnic Institute	Worcester, Massachusetts	Active	
**Beta Tau**	1977	Tulane University	New Orleans, Louisiana	Active	
**Iota Alpha**	1979–2005, 2008	University of Texas at Austin	Austin, Texas	Active	
**Rho Alpha**	1979	Massachusetts Institute of Technology	Cambridge, Massachusetts	Active	
Psi Zeta	1979–1984	Ohio State University	Columbus, Ohio	Inactive	(Note: Temporarily Active in 2017, 2019. OSU suspended all its IFC chapters' activities including Psi Zeta's in November 2017.)
**Iota Delta**	1981–1998, 2014	University of California, Davis	Davis, California	Active	
Alpha Omega	1984–1999	Villanova University	Radnor Township, Pennsylvania	Inactive	
**Omicron Epsilon** (See Omicron Prime)	1983	Princeton University	Princeton, New Jersey	Active	(Note: The Princeton chapter was re-established under this new name after a long vacancy.)
**Kappa Phi**	1984	Cooper Union	New York City, New York	Active	
Delta Alpha	1990–1995	University of Colorado Boulder	Boulder, Colorado	Inactive	
Alpha Nu	1991–2007	Claremont Colleges	Claremont, California	Inactive	
Tau Alpha	1992–1998	Texas A&M University	College Station, Texas	Inactive	
Theta Tau	1995–2002	University of Vermont	Burlington, Vermont	Inactive	
Psi Kappa	1996–1998	University of Southern California	Los Angeles, California	Inactive	
Mu Alpha	1999–2003	Texas Tech University	Lubbock, Texas	Inactive	
Delta Kappa	2000–2004	University of New Brunswick	Fredericton, New Brunswick, Canada	Inactive	
**Nu Delta**	2000–2007, 2011	Marist College	Poughkeepsie, New York	Active	
**Alpha Theta**	2001–2010, 2015	University of Waterloo	Waterloo, Ontario, Canada	Active	
**Alpha Theta**	2001–2010, 2015	Wilfrid Laurier University	Waterloo, Ontario, Canada	Active	
Nu Sigma	2003–2016, 2025	Seton Hall University	South Orange, New Jersey	Active	(Note: Suspended by the University for five years in 2016.)
**Tau Theta**	2005	Ontario Tech University	Oshawa, Ontario, Canada	Active	
Beta Sigma	2007–2008	University of Georgia	Athens, Georgia	Inactive	
Mu Pi	2007–2010s	Binghamton University	Binghamton, New York	Inactive	
Sigma Gamma	2007–20xx ?	North Carolina State University	Raleigh, North Carolina	Inactive	(Note: Not recognized by its university.)
**Iota Omicron**	2008	University of Oxford	Oxford, England	Active	
**Gamma Epsilon**	2009	Georgetown University	Washington, D.C.	Active	
**Theta Eta**	2009	Brock University	St. Catharines, Ontario, Canada	Active	
**Theta Psi**	2010	Queen's University at Kingston	Kingston, Ontario, Canada	Active	
Sigma Omicron	2011–2014	University of St Andrews	St. Andrews, Fife, Scotland	Inactive	
**Theta Omicron**	2012	Trinity College Dublin	Dublin, Ireland	Active	
**Iota Nu**	2013	University of Nevada, Reno	Reno, Nevada	Active	
**Omega Alpha** (See Omega Prime)	2013	University of Chicago	Chicago, Illinois	Active	(Note: Viewed as a separate chapter from Omega at the Old University of Chicago active 1864–1868, 1879–1887)
**Beta Delta**	2015	University of Arizona	Tucson, Arizona	Active	
**Sigma Beta**	2015	University of California, Santa Barbara	Santa Barbara, California	Active	
**Zeta Tau**	2015	Michigan State University	East Lansing, Michigan	Active	
**Gamma Psi**	2016	University of Guelph	Guelph, Ontario, Canada	Active	(Note: This chapter in Ontario is missing the customary "Theta" letter referred to in the Toronto chapter.)
**Psi Omicron**	2019	University of Paris	Paris, France	Active	
**Kappa Delta**	2020	George Mason University	Fairfax, Virginia	Active	
**Kappa Alpha**	May 20, 2023	American College of Greece	Athens, Greece	Active	(Note: First American-style men's fraternity in Greece.)
**Rho Tau**	November 8, 2024	University of Alabama	Tuscaloosa, Alabama	Active	
**Zeta Epsilon**	December 2024	Grand Valley State University	Allendale, Michigan	Active	
**Kappa Beta**	March 31, 2025	Al Akhawayn University	Ifrane, Morocco	Active	(Note: First American-style men's fraternity in Morocco.)
**Chi Tau**	August 23, 2025	Clemson University	Clemson, South Carolina	Active	
**Tau Omicron**	September 20, 2025	IE University	Madrid, Spain	Active	
**Iota Pi**	November 7, 2025	University of Tennessee	Knoxville, Tennessee	Active	
