= Sigma Alpha =

Sigma Alpha may refer to

- Sigma Alpha (fraternity), a social fraternity
- Sigma Alpha (professional sorority), an agricultural professional sorority
