= Zeta Phi Rho =

American collegiate Asian-interest fraternity

- ΖΦΡ
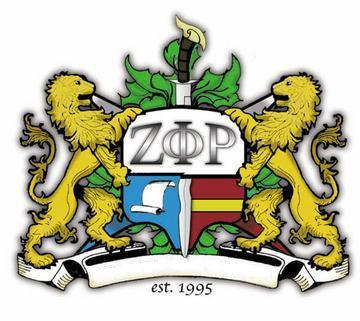
- Founded: August 10, 1995; 31 years ago California State University, Long Beach
- Type: Social
- Affiliation: Independent
- Status: Defunct
- Emphasis: Multicultural - Asian Interest
- Scope: Regional (CA)
- Motto: "For Without Struggle, There is No Progress"
- Colors: Navy Blue and White
- Chapters: 10 (1 Active)
- Nickname: Zetas/Socal Zetas
- Headquarters: 1250 N Bellflower Blvd; Long Beach, California 90804; United States
- Website: lbzetaphirho.wixsite.com/alpha

Zeta Phi Rho (ΖΦΡ) is an American multicultural/Asian interest fraternity based in Southern California. Founded in 1995 at California State University, Long Beach, the fraternity has five active chapters in the Southern California region. Zeta Phi Rho is independent and is managed by its regional board composed of executive board members across various chapters.

== History ==
Zeta Phi Rho was established at California State University, Long Beach in 1995. Its fourteen founding fathers were:

- Christopher Arnaldo
- Francis Baylen
- Carlo Boiser
- Joseph Braza
- Butch Callanta
- Ian Carbonell
- Archie Cardenas
- Vincent Delupio
- Johnnie Garcia
- Ronald Hipol
- Alfred Perdito
- Jan-Michael Roy
- Carlos Sanchez
- Greg San Luis

Zeta Phi Rho focuses on developing a diverse group of brothers committed to Brotherhood, Academics, Philanthropy, and Social. The fraternity is described as having a "strong brotherhood, familial atmosphere, and constantly striv[ing] to maintain its place as a brotherhood of distinguished gentlemen".

== Philanthropy ==
Fraternity chapters hold various philanthropies in their respective communities including SmokeOut at the Beach (Alpha chapter, 2007) an effort to raise awareness of the dangers of smoking, Boot Camp"(Zeta chapter, 2010) to support children diagnosed with HIV, and Zeta Phi "Skid" Rho (Gamma chapter, 2001–Present) providing food for the homeless in the Skid Row area of Los Angeles. On March 28, 2014, Zeta Phi Rho made 17,341 sandwiches under one hour, breaking a Guinness World Record at the same time.

Zeta Phi Rho focuses on raising cultural awareness with the Philip Vera Cruz/Cesar Chavez March (Alpha chapter, 2008) and the Raise the Roof Benefit Concert (Alpha chapter, 2008) for Gawad Kalinga, a philanthropic organization aimed at ending worldwide poverty. A more recent example of philanthropic efforts includes the Blu Carpet Affair, a film festival that donates proceeds to the Children of Uganda through Invisible Children (Eta chapter, 2008).

By 2000, Zeta Phi Rho had adopted Habitat for Humanity (HfH) as its all-chapter benefit charity.

Zeta Phi Rho annually attends the LA AIDS WALK in West Hollywood, CA to continue to raise awareness and show support for minority groups.

== Chapters ==
Zeta Phi Rho has established ten chapters in California, one remains active. Active chapters are inidicated in bold. Inactive chapters are in italics.

Chapter	Charter date and range	Institution	Location	Status	Ref.
Alpha	August 10, 1995	California State University, Long Beach	Long Beach, California	Inactive	
**Beta**	March 16, 1996	University of California, Santa Barbara	Santa Barbara, California	Active	
Gamma	March 23, 1996	University of Southern California	Los Angeles, California	Inactive	
Delta	November 24, 1996	Loyola Marymount University	Los Angeles, California	Inactive	
Epsilon	September 17, 2000	California State Polytechnic University, Pomona	Pomona, California	Inactive	
Zeta	January 11, 2002	University of California, Irvine	Irvine, California	Inactive	
Eta	February 22, 2004	University of California, Los Angeles	Los Angeles, California	Inactive	
Theta	December 5, 2004	University of California, Riverside	Riverside, California	Inactive	
Iota	October 11, 2008	California State University, Fullerton	Fullerton, California	Inactive	
Kappa	June 20, 2014	California State University, Northridge	Northridge, California	Inactive	

== Notable alumni ==
- Big Matthew - Korean-American rapper, songwriter, and member of the Korean pop group Kard

== See also ==
- List of social fraternities
- Cultural interest fraternities and sororities
- Asian Americans in California
