= Delta Rho Upsilon =

Social fraternity at Carroll University in Wisconsin, U.S.

- ΔΡΥ
- Founded: November 12, 1929; 96 years ago Carroll University
- Type: Social
- Affiliation: Independent
- Status: Active
- Scope: Local
- Mascot: Pink Panther
- Publication: The Scoop
- Chapters: 1 active
- Members: 50 active
- Nickname: D.R.s, Delta Rhos
- Headquarters: 427 E Broadway; Waukesha, Wisconsin 53186; United States
- Website: www.deltarhoupsilon.org

Delta Rho Upsilon (ΔΡΥ) is a local fraternity at Carroll University in Waukesha, Wisconsin. It was established as the Pioneer Club in 1929.

== History ==
Delta Rho Upsilon was originally called the Pioneer Club at its founding on November 12, 1929. Harold Hamilton was the first president of the fraternity. It existed under this name for over twenty years until its Greek letters were adopted in the 1950s to avoid confusion between the University's mascot and other similarly-named student organizations. The fraternity was also known as the Pioneer Fraternity in the 1940s. Delta Rho Upsilon has always been a social, or general fraternity.

While Delta Rho Upsilon has been a local organization on the Carroll campus for over ninety years, briefly in the 1960s a second, Beta chapter was placed at the Milwaukee Institute of Technology; it was closed when that college transferred ownership to a two-year technical college called the Milwaukee Area Technology College.

Delta Rho Upsilon elects a Rose Queen each year in addition to holding a semi-formal and formal dance.

== Symbols ==
The current mascot is the Pink Panther. Fraternity members and alumni are called "D.R.s" or "Delta Rhos". When the Little Sister organization existed its female auxiliary members were called "Little Sis's".

== Chapters ==
In the folfowing list, active chapters are indicated in bold and inactive chapters and institutions are in italics.

Chapter	Charter date and range	Institution	Location	Status	Ref.
**Alpha**	November 12, 1929	Carroll University	Waukesha, Wisconsin	Active	(Note: Chapter was originally called the Pioneer Club and, later, the Pioneer Fraternity.)
Beta	196x ?–c. 1968	Milwaukee Institute of Technology	Milwaukee, Wisconsin	Inactive	(Note: In 1968, the institute merged with the Milwaukee Area Technical College to become Milwaukee Area Technical College.)

== Chapter house ==
The fraternity has resided in several houses on the Carroll University campus, some of which have been torn down due to the campus expansion; a former home at 124 McCall Street was long vacant while ownership was litigated beginning in 2001, and an eventual sale concluded in 2012.

Today, a clubhouse for the Active Chapter/Alumni Association is maintained by the fraternity at the corner of Hartwell Avenue and East Broadway Street, off campus.

=== Property litigation ===
Regarding the home at 124 McCall Street, Waukesha, it was designed and built on the site of two former properties by the fraternity's alumni association. The Fraternity first occupied the new building in the fall of 1974. In a 2002 lawsuit seeking title, the alumni asserted they have maintained the property, and had paid all costs for mortgage, maintenance, and upkeep. Additionally, they asserted expenditures of "between $40,000-$50,000 on upgrades and improvements." The College had been the Fraternity's lien holder, which the Fraternity explains was a "convenience", under an agreement that when the property was paid off, the College would transfer the title. With the mortgage paid, the DRU Alumni Association asserted their demand for a title, but this had not been provided; instead, the college offered a buyout for $138,000. A lawsuit was filed to adjudicate the matter, later resolved in the fraternity's favor.

With an eye on another building, in 2011 the alumni had determined to sell the 124 McCall property, which it now owned, but which had been cited by the City with complaints about deferred maintenance. These opened the door for unrelated claimants to attempt to seize the property, all of which were denied. A buyer was found, and the property was sold late in 2011.

== See also ==
- List of social fraternities
