= Gamma Phi Gamma =

American collegiate fraternity at Wilmington College

- ΓΦΓ
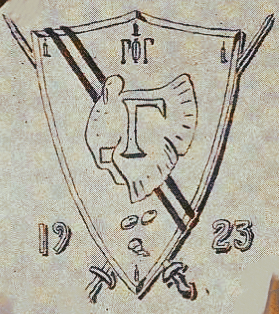
- Founded: 1907; 119 years ago Wilmington College
- Type: Social
- Affiliation: Independent
- Status: Active
- Scope: Local
- Colors: Blue and White
- Chapters: 1
- Members: 1,200+ lifetime
- Nickname: Gobblers
- Headquarters: 673 Fife Ave; Wilmington, Ohio 45177; United States

Gamma Phi Gamma (ΓΦΓ) is a local social fraternity at Wilmington College in Ohio. It was established in 1907.

== History ==
In 1907, college student Herbert Haynes had the idea of starting a secret society for the male students of Wilmington College in Wilmington, Ohio. Haynes shared his idea with John Carey, Henry J. Linton, and Charles Starbuck who were Wilmington, Ohio residents. Gamma Phi Gamma was established at Wilmington College in 1907. It was one of the first secret societies or fraternities acknowledged by Wilmington College.

The membership of Gamma Phi Gamma was originally limited to four people. When Haynes graduated in 1909, Charles Doan became the campus leader of the fraternity. Later members included Herbert Sanders and Edwin J. Bath. Bath was responsible for getting Wilmington College president Albert J. Brown to recognize the fraternity as a campus organization.

Gamma Phi Gamma had initiated more than forty members by 1917. During World War I, the fraternity helped raise money to support soldiers. After the war, the fraternity continued to grow. It went temporarily inactive during World War II, reactivating in the fall of 1944.

By 1945, it was the oldest and largest fraternity at Wilmington College. The fraternity moved to a house at 403 East Locust Street in 1945.

The fraternity established the Gamma Phi Gamma Foundation, run by fraternity alumni. Gamma Phi Gamma initiated its 1,000th member in 1992.

For its 85th anniversary in 1992, the fraternity published a book about its history. As part of its anniversary celebration, the fraternity installed a 23 feet (7.0 m) flag at its chapter house. The flag pole's foundation included a time capsule and the names of seven alumni. Its first flag flown was provided by Congressman Bob McEwan.

On April 26, 1999, the fraternity's house was significantly damaged by fire. It was reopened In March 2000.

The fraternity has initiated more that 1,200 members by 2013. Gamma Phi Gamma was banned from the Wilmington College campus in January 2014 until at least 2019 for a 2013 hazing incident. Gamma Phi Gamma was reinstated at the college in 2022. It claims to be America's oldest surviving local fraternity.

== Symbols and traditions ==
The nickname of Gamma Phi Gamma is The Gobblers. The fraternity's off-campus chapter house is called the "Gobbler House". The house includes a time capsule within its stone fireplace with a time capsule; engraved on the time capsule is "East West Home is Best". It is located at 673 Fife Avenue in Wilmington.

The fraternity's mission is "To pledge men who would promote their core values: brotherhood and sociability." The fraternity's colors are blue and white.

== Misconduct and scandals ==
- In May 1922, the fraternity's pledges walked the streets of Wilmington in costume as part of their "pledge term workouts". They were dressed as ditch diggers, waiters, and Russian Cossacks.
- In 2000, the college suspended the fraternity for a hazing incident.
- In 2013, Tyler Lawrence, a Gamma Phi Gamma pledge, was injured in a Halloween hazing incident, resulting in the loss of a testicle. Court testimony indicated that the pledges were "blindfolded, told to strip, had their mouths stuffed with limburger cheese and [were] hit with “towels and shirts that had the ends balled up in knots” or which had items tied inside to inflict pain". The naked pledges were also "covered in an Icy-Hot-like substance and told to make sexually explicit motions while being whipped with towels." Gamma Phi Gamma was banned from the Wilmington College campus in January 2014. In May 2014, fourteen members of the fraternity were arrested for their involvement in the hazing incident. However, Lawrence stated that this was a "freak accident", not hazing. Seven fraternity members pled guilty to the hazing charges.

== See also ==
- List of social fraternities
- Hazing in Greek letter organizations
