= Beggars (fraternity) =

American Jesuit collegiate fraternity

- ΒΕΓΓΑΡΣ
- Founded: December 20, 1923; 101 years ago Loyola University New Orleans
- Type: Social
- Affiliation: Independent
- Status: Active ?
- Scope: Local
- Colors: Gold, Navy Blue, and White
- Symbol: Triangle, circle, flash
- Flower: White carnation
- Chapters: 1
- Headquarters: New Orleans, Louisiana; United States
- Website: www.loyno.edu/~beggars/

Beggars (ΒΕΓΓΑΡΣ), established December 20, 1923, is the oldest Jesuit fraternity in the United States. The Beggars Fraternity of Loyola University New Orleans is the first social fraternity at a Jesuit university.

== History ==
On December 22, 1923, during the Christmas holidays, Gardere Moore invited several Loyola students to his home to begin a fraternal organization. The new organization took the name Beggars in order not to be classified as a Greek letter fraternity.

Beggars is "dedicated to promoting brotherhood among its members as well as their spiritual, academic, and social betterment, and also that of the entire Loyola community." After the ban on fraternities was lifted, this name was transliterated into Greek, Beta Epsilon Gamma Gamma Alpha Rho Sigma.

As of 6 June 2024, Beggars is no longer listed on the campus Fraternity and Sorority Life portal, nor is its website available.

== Symbols ==
The fraternity's Greek letter name, Beta Epsilon Gamma Gamma Alpha Rho Sigma, was selected to spell the word Beggars. The fraternity's colors are gold, navy blue, and white. Its flower is the white carnation. Its symbols are the triangle, circle, and flash.

== Activities ==
The Men of Beggars have been a part of the campus since its founding as the first fraternity in 1923. Both the school's newspaper and the Student Government Association were started by members of Beggars. The fraternity and its alumni association donated the flagpole in front of Biever Hall, the stained glass window in Marquette Hall, and the tile mosaic on the library to the university. Beggars host Loyola's oldest party, Beggars Blast, and the Halloween party, Dark Carnival.

== Membership ==
Membership of Beggars is by invitation, requiring unanimous approval by the entire fraternity, and therefore does not operate on quotas.

== Misconduct ==
The university suspended Beggars for the fall 2009 semester, through December 21, 2009, for having "dirty" pledge classes. "Dirty" pledges do not have the grade point average required by the university before joining a Greek letter organization.

== See also ==
- List of social fraternities
- Christian fraternities
