= Alpha Pi Lambda =

American fraternity at Drexel University

- ΑΠΛ
- Founded: March 3, 1935; 91 years ago Drexel Institute of Technology
- Type: Social
- Affiliation: Independent
- Status: Active
- Scope: Local
- Pillars: Friendship, Honor, and Loyalty
- Colors: Crimson and Grey
- Chapters: 1
- Nickname: Apple Pi
- Headquarters: 216 North 33rd Street; Philadelphia, Pennsylvania 19104; United States
- Website: www.applepi.org

Alpha Pi Lambda (ΑΠΛ) is a local collegiate fraternity at Drexel University in Philadelphia, Pennsylvania, United States. It was established in 1935.

== History ==
Alpha Pi Lambda fraternity was founded at the Drexel Institute of Technology in Philadelphia, Pennsylvania, on March 3, 1935. It was created as a local fraternity, with no intention of seeking national affiliation.

The fraternity's first president was John Linehan. Its faculty advisor was Samuel Leonard of the Civil Engineering Department. In the fall of 1935, the fraternity held a Gala Homecoming Dance with the Don Brill Orchestra.

The university suspended Alpha Pi Lambda for one year in January 2003 for violating the student code relating to "detrimental behavior". In February 2004, the newly reactivated fraternity lost its university recognition and its chapter house for violations of university policies, including "detrimental behavior, hazing and failure to comply with an appropriate directive or disciplinary decision". The fraternity was eligible to return to campus in the fall of 2005, if it made a successful petition to the university's Office of Campus Activities, Judicial Affairs, the dean of students, and the Inter-Fraternity Council.

Alpha Pi Lambda was re-established in April 2006. Its alumni undertook a capital campaign and renovated the chapter house, which was reoccupied in 2008. Alpha Pi Lambda's chapter house and headquarters are at 216 North 33rd Street in Philadelphia.

== Symbols ==
Alpha Pi Lambda was established on the principles or pillars of friendship, honor, and loyalty. Its colors are crimson and grey. The fraternity's nickname is Apple Pi.

== Chapter house ==
The fraternity secured its first chapter house on Baring Street in 1936. After moving to a house on the corner of 34th Street and Powelton Avenue, Alpha Pi Lambda purchased its current chapter house at 33rd Street and Powelton Avenue in the fall of 1939.

Called the "Castle on the Corner", the fraternity's house was the former home of brewer and real estate developer Frederick A. Poth and was designed by architect A. W. Dilks in 1887. This four-story, 11,900 square feet (1,110 m^{2}) mansion has sixteen bedrooms. It was badly damaged by smoke and water after a basement fire in 1968.

Located at 216 North 33rd Street in Philadelphia, the Castle on the Corner is the largest fraternity house on the Drexel campus. It is also one of the most historically significant buildings in West Philadelphia. It was added to the National Register of Historic Places in May 1985 as part of the Powelton Historic District.

== Activities ==
Alpha Pi Lambda's activities include social events and philanthropy. To raise money for charity, it converts its house into a haunted yearly. The event supports the Merciful Savior School for children with cerebral palsy.

== Member misconduct ==
On August 23, 1990, an Alpha Pi Lambda pledge fell to his death from the fourth-story roof of the chapter house. He had been drinking off-campus before the fatal accident. His body was discovered the next day in the alley behind the house.

== See also ==
- List of social fraternities
