= Phi Eta Kappa =

American local fraternity at the University of Maine

- ΦΗΚ
- Founded: 1906; 120 years ago University of Maine
- Type: Social
- Affiliation: Independent
- Status: Active
- Scope: Local
- Colors: Green and White
- Chapters: 1
- Members: 1,000 lifetime
- Nickname: Phi Eta
- Headquarters: 107 College Ave; Orono, Maine 04473; United States
- Website: www.phietakappa.com

Phi Eta Kappa (ΦΗΚ) is a fraternity at the University of Maine. Founded in 1906, Phi Eta Kappa has remained unaffiliated with any national organizations, choosing instead to preserve their local tradition. Since 1910 the "Green Wave," as it is known, have been located in a fraternity house on College Avenue in Orono, Maine. There are currently over 1,000 living alumni of Phi Eta Kappa.

== History ==
Phi Eta Kappa was founded as a for-profit organization owned by its members who bought stock in the fraternity. Sale of shares ceased circa 1942, and by 2001 the organization no longer knew who its shareholders were. Since the 1940s, funds for operations have come from rent charged to members, a mortgage on the fraternity house, and alumni donations. In the 1980s, the fraternity encountered financial difficulties that were attributed to members who had not paid their bills.

The fraternity house was closed temporarily in 1988 due to its deteriorating physical condition and concerns about poor behavior by its members. Later that year it was rented to house the Pi Beta Phi sorority. Subsequently, however, it was reopened for Phi Eta Kappa.

In 2001 the fraternity asked the Maine State Legislature to enact legislation to convert the fraternity to nonprofit status so it would no longer be required to pay the same taxes as a commercial business.

The fraternity reported on its website that it would again cease operations in August 2014; a group of alumni began organizing a revival just prior to the COVID pandemic of 2020. Meanwhile, the building remains occupied. In 2014 it was leased to Chi Omega sorority. Later, a new chapter of Sigma Pi fraternity formed on the campus. Phi Eta Kappa has since returned to their house and remains active on campus.

== Athletics ==
Phi Eta Kappa emphasizes athletics. The fraternity won the BC Kent Award multiple times. This award is given annually to the University of Maine fraternity which has the highest combined point total for all intramural events. Phi Eta Kappa won the award nine consecutive years, from 1994 to 2002. Phi Eta Kappa alumni in professional sports include Mike Buck, who played four seasons as a quarterback in the NFL and holds most passing records at Maine; and Greg Panora, professional powerlifter, who holds the world record for combined bench, squat and deadlift at 2,481 lb (1,125 kg) for the 242 lb (110 kg) weight class.

== Notable members ==
Notable alumni include former Maine governor John H. Reed, the late University of Maine president Winthrop Libby, successful businessmen and philanthropists Larry and Keith Mahaney, businessman Eldon Morrison, Maine Superior Court Justice E. Allen Hunter, Air Force test pilot Robert A. Rushworth, UMaine head football coach Jack Cosgrove, Clemson University head baseball coach Jack Leggett, and Dartmouth College head baseball coach Bob Whalen.
