= List of social fraternities =

Social, collegiate, or general fraternities in the North American fraternity system are those that do not promote a particular profession, as professional fraternities do, or discipline, such as service fraternities. Instead, their primary purposes are often stated as the development of character, literary or leadership ability, or to serve a simpler social purpose.

A fraternity is usually understood to mean a social organization composed only of men, while a sorority is composed of women. However, many women's organizations and co-ed organizations refer to themselves as women's fraternities.

This list of collegiate North American fraternities is not exhaustive. It consists only of social collegiate fraternities; other types of social fraternal organizations can be found under the list of general fraternities. Cultural interest groups can be found under cultural interest fraternities and sororities. Women's organizations are listed in List of social sororities and women's fraternities.

Some organizations in this list have a specific major listed as a traditional emphasis. These organizations are social organizations that cater to students in those majors. Other listed fraternities have a traditional emphasis on a specific religion or ethnic background but are primarily social in function.

== Fraternities ==
Active fraternities are indicated in bold. Inactive fraternities are indicated in italics.

Organization	Symbol	Charter date and range	Scope	Affiliation (Note: Includes college or university for local fraternities.)	Type	Crest motto (Note: Any text contained within the crests. This does not necessarily correspond to the motto. The orthography and punctuation are as depicted on the crest and are not necessarily grammatically correct.)	Status	Ref.
**Acacia**	ΑΚΑΚΙΑ	1904	International	NIC	Masonic	ΩΦΕΛΟΥΝΤΕΣ ΑΝΘΡΩΠΟΥΣ, 'Human Service'	Active	(Note: Masonic membership no longer required.)
**Adelphic Alpha Pi**	ΑΑΠ	1862	Local	University of Olivet	Traditional	Semper Fidelis	Active	
**Adelphikos**	ΑΔΕΛ	1913	Local	Grove City College	Christian	ΑΔΕΛΦΙΚΟΣ, 'Brotherly'	Active	
Alpha Chi	ΑΧ	1872–1884	Local	Yale University	Traditional, Freshmen		Inactive	
**Alpha Chi Alpha**	ΑΧΑ	1919	Local	Dartmouth College	Traditional	Fidelis et Suavis, 'Loyal and sweet'	Active	
**Alpha Chi Rho**	ΑΧΡ	1895	National	NIC	Traditional	ΑΝΔΡΙΖΕΣΘΕ, 'Be Men'	Active	
**Alpha Delta**	ΑΔ	1912	Local	Washburn University	Traditional		Active	
Alpha Delta Alpha	ΑΔΑ	1920–1934	National	Independent	Traditional		Inactive	(Note: Formerly a member of NIC.) (Note: Dispersed to multiple fraternities.)
**Alpha Delta Gamma**	ΑΔΓ	1924	National	NIC	Jesuit	Γνωσθέντες εφ φίλων, 'Known by friends'	Active	
**Alpha Delta Phi**	ΑΔΦ	1832	International	NIC	Traditional	Manus Multae Cor Unum, 'Many hands one heart'	Active	(Note: Founded as a secret literary society)
Alpha Digamma	ΑϜ	1859–1920	Regional	Independent	Traditional		Inactive	
**Alpha Epsilon Pi**	ΑΕΠ	1913	International	FFC	Jewish	ΕΣΠΟΝΔΑ	Active	
Alpha Gamma	ΑΓ	1867–1885	National	Independent	Traditional		Inactive	(Note: Merged with Alpha Tau Omega and dispersed to multiple fraternities)
**Alpha Gamma Omega**	ΑΓΩ	1927	National	Independent	Christian	ΑΛΦΑ ΓΑΜΜΑ ΩΜΕΓΑ	Active	
Alpha Gamma Upsilon	ΑΓΥ	1922–May 1965	National	Independent	Traditional		Inactive	(Note: Merged with Alpha Sigma Phi and dispersed to multiple fraternities.)
Alpha Kappa	ΑΚ	1878–1884	Local	Yale University	Traditional, Sophomore		Inactive	
**Alpha Kappa Lambda**	ΑΚΛ	1914	National	NIC	Traditional	Αληθεια και Λογος [sic], 'Truth and the Word'	Active	
Alpha Kappa Phi	ΑΚΦ	1858–1878	National	Independent	Traditional, literary		Inactive	
Alpha Kappa Pi	ΑΚΠ	1921–1946	National	NIC	Traditional		Inactive	(Note: Merged with Alpha Sigma Phi.)
**Alpha Lambda Mu**	ΑΛΜ	2013	National	Independent	Muslim		Active	
Alpha Lambda Tau	ΑΛΤ	1916–1946	National	NIC	Traditional		Inactive	(Note: Merged with Tau Kappa Epsilon and dispersed to multiple fraternities.)
**Alpha Phi Alpha**	ΑΦΑ	1906	International	NIC, NPHC	African-American	Αλφα Φι Αλφα	Active	
**Alpha Phi Delta**	ΑΦΔ	1914	National	NIC	Italian heritage	Faciamus, 'We Do'	Active	
**Alpha Pi Lambda**	ΑΠΛ	1935	Local	Drexel University	Traditional		Active	
**Alpha Psi Rho**	ΑΨΡ	2000	National	Independent	Asian–Pacific Islander		Active	
**Alpha Sigma Phi**	ΑΣΦ	1845	International	FFC	Traditional	Causa Latet vIs est Notissima, 'The cause is hidden, the results well-known'	Active	(Note: Formerly a member of NIC.)
**Alpha Tau Omega**	ΑΤΩ	1865	National	NIC, FFC	Traditional	πι εψιλον πι	Active	(Note: Founded on Christian principles)
Achania (Alpha Kappa Phi)	ΑΚΦ	1854–c. 2021	Local	University of the Pacific	Traditional		Inactive	(Note: The fraternity went inactive during the COVID pandemic. As of February 2024, its alumni association is working on reactivating the fraternity with its new national partner, Phi Kappa Psi.)
**Beta Chi Theta**	ΒΧΘ	1999	National	NIC, NAPA	South Asian	Βητα Χι Θητα	Active	
**Beta Epsilon Gamma Gamma Alpha Rho Sigma**	ΒΕΓΓΑΡΣ	1923	Local	Loyola University New Orleans	Jesuit	BEGGARS	Active	
Beta Kappa	ΒΚ	1901–1942	National	NIC	Traditional		Inactive	(Note: Merged with Theta Chi.)
**Beta Phi Omega**	ΒΦΩ	1967	Local	Wright State University	Traditional		Active	
**Beta Sigma Psi**	ΒΣΨ	1925	National	NIC	Lutheran	per aspera ad astra, 'Through adversity to the stars'	Active	
Beta Sigma Rho	ΒΣΡ	1910–1972	National	NIC	Traditional		Inactive	(Note: Merged with Pi Lambda Phi.)
**Beta Theta Pi**	ΒΘΠ	1839	International	NIC	Traditional	και	Active	
**Beta Upsilon Chi**	ΒΥΧ	1985	National	NIC	Christian	Brothers Under Christ	Active	
**Bones Gate**	BG	1901	Local	Dartmouth College	Traditional		Active	
Book and Bond (Phi Kappa Epsilon)	ΦΚΕ	1899–1935	Local	Yale University	Traditional		Inactive	
**Chi Gamma Epsilon**	ΧΓΕ	1905 (1987)	Local	Dartmouth College	Traditional		Active	
**Chi Heorot**	ΧH	1897	Local	Dartmouth College	Traditional		Active	
**Chi Phi**	ΧΦ	1854	National	NIC	Traditional	Chi Phi	Active	
**Chi Psi**	ΧΨ	1841	National	NIC	Traditional		Active	
**Chi Sigma Chi**	ΧΣΧ	1936	Local	University of Redlands	Traditional		Active	
**Delphic Fraternity**	ΓΣΤ	1871	National	Independent	Traditional	Δελφικοσ [sic], 'Delphics'	Active	(Note: Originally a literary society)
Delta Alpha Pi	ΔΑΠ	1919–1935	National	NIC	Traditional		Inactive	(Note: Merged with Phi Mu Delta.)
Delta Beta Xi	ΔΒΞ	1864–1875	Local	Yale University	Traditional		Inactive	
**Delta Chi**	ΔΧ	1890	International	NIC	Traditional	Leges, 'Laws'	Active	(Note: Originally a law fraternity.)
**Delta Epsilon Psi**	ΔΕΨ	1998	National	NAPA	South Asian		Active	(Note: Formerly a member of NIC.)
Delta Kappa	ΔΚ	1845–1880	Local	Yale University	Traditional, Freshmen		Inactive	
**Delta Kappa**	ΔΚ	1920	Local	Buffalo State College	Traditional		Active	(Note: Merged with Sigma Pi. However, local chapters still exist.)
**Delta Kappa Epsilon**	ΔΚΕ	1844	International	NIC	Traditional	Κηροθεν φιλοι α´ει [sic], 'Brothers From the Heart, Forever'	Active	(Note: Originally a secret society.)
**Delta Lambda Phi**	ΔΛΦ	1986	International	NIC	Gay, bisexual, transgender	Delta Lambda Phi	Active	
**Delta Phi**	ΔΦ	1827	National	NIC	Traditional		Active	(Note: Originally a secret society.)
**Delta Psi**	ΔΨ	1850	Local	University of Vermont	Traditional		Inactive	(Note: Originally a secret society.)
**Delta Psi (St. Anthony Hall)**	ΔΨ	1847	National	Independent	Literary		Active	(Note: This organization is listed as both fraternities and co-ed groups.)
**Delta Psi Delta**	ΔΨΔ	1904	Local	Linfield University	Traditional		Active	
**Delta Psi Delta**	ΔΨΔ	1929	Local	California State University, Chico	Traditional		Active	
**Delta Rho Upsilon**	ΔΡΥ	1929	Local	Carroll University	Traditional		Active	
Delta Sigma	ΔΣ	1897	Local	Northwestern Universtiy	Traditional		Inactive	
**Delta Sigma Chi**	ΔΣΧ	1963	Local	University of Pittsburgh at Johnstown	Traditional		Active	
Delta Sigma Lambda	ΔΣΛ	1921–1937	National	NIC	Traditional		Inactive	(Note: Merged with Theta Chi.)
**Delta Sigma Phi**	ΔΣΦ	1899	National	NIC	Traditional	Δελτα Σιγμα Φι	Active	
**Delta Tau Delta**	ΔΤΔ	1858	International	NIC	Traditional	Delta Tau Delta	Active	(Note: Originally a literary society.)
**Delta Upsilon**	ΔΥ	1834	International	NIC	Traditional	Δικαία Ὑποθήκη, 'Justice, our foundation'	Active	
Eta Phi	ΗΦ	1879–1902	Local	Yale University	Traditional, Sophomore		Inactive	
**FarmHouse**	FH	1905	International	NIC	Traditional	Farmhouse 1905	Active	(Note: Originally an agricultural fraternity.)
Gamma Nu	ΓΝ	1855–1889	Local	Yale University	Traditional, Freshmen		Inactive	
**Gamma Phi Gamma**	ΓΦΓ	1907	Local	Wilmington College	Traditional		Active	
**Gamma Zeta Alpha**	ΓΖΑ	1987	National	NALFO	Latino		Active	
Hé Boulé		1875–1902	Local	Yale University	Traditional, Sophomore		Inactive	
**Iota Nu Delta**	ΙΝΔ	1994	International	NIC, NAPA	South Asian	ΑΔΕΛΦΟΣΥΝΗ ΑΙΩΝΙΑ, 'Eternal Brotherhood'	Active	
**Iota Phi Theta**	ΙΦΘ	1963	International	NIC, NPHC	African-American		Active	
**Kappa Alpha Order**	ΚΑ	1865	National	FFC	Traditional	Dieu et Les Dames, 'God and the ladies'	Active	
**Kappa Alpha Psi**	ΚΑΨ	1911	International	NIC, NPHC	African-American	τελειωσις, δια φιλανθρωπιαν νοησιν πιστιν [sic], 'Perfection, for the true belief in philanthropy'	Active	
**Kappa Alpha Society**	ΚΑ	1825	International	NIC	Traditional		Active	(Note: Originally a literary society.)
**Kappa Delta Phi**	ΚΔΦ	1900	National	NIC	Traditional	Καππα Δελτα Φι, Kappa Delta Phi	Active	
**Kappa Delta Rho**	ΚΔΡ	1905	National	NIC	Traditional	Honor Super Omnia, 'Honor Above All Things'	Active	
Kappa Nu	ΚΝ	1911–1961	National	NIC	Jewish		Inactive	(Note: Merged with Phi Epsilon Pi.)
Kappa Phi Lambda	ΚΦΛ	1862–1874	National	Independent	Traditional		Inactive	(Note: Disbanded and dispersed to multiple fraternities.)
**Kappa Pi Kappa**	ΚΠΚ	1842	Local	Dartmouth College	Traditional		Active	
Kappa Psi	ΚΨ	1875–1902	Local	Yale University	Traditional, Sophomore		Inactive	
**Kappa Sigma**	ΚΣ	1869	International	Independent	Traditional	ΑΕΚΔΒ	Active	(Note: Formerly a member of NIC)
Kappa Sigma Alpha	ΚΣΑ	1922	Local	University of Olivet	Traditional		Active	
Kappa Sigma Epsilon	ΚΣΕ	1840–1880	Local	Yale University	Traditional, Freshmen		Inactive	
Kappa Sigma Theta	ΚΣΘ	1838–1857	Local	Yale University	Traditional, Sophomore		Inactive	
**Lambda Alpha Upsilon**	ΛΑΥ	1985	National	NALFO	Latino	Venceremos Porque Nacimos Para Triunfar, 'We will overcome because we are born to triumph'	Active	
**Lambda Chi Alpha**	ΛΧΑ	1909	International	Independent	Traditional	Per Cruscem Crescens, 'Crescent in the Cross'; Vir Quisque Vir, 'Every man a man'	Active	(Note: Formerly a member of NIC.)
Lambda Iota Society	ΛΙ	1836–2018	Local	University of Vermont	Traditional		Inactive	(Note: Originally a secret literary society)
Lambda Phi Delta	ΛΦΔ	c. 1968–c. 1975	Local	State University of New York at Cortland	Traditional		Inactive	
**Lambda Phi Epsilon**	ΛΦΕ	1981	International	NIC, NAPA	Asian-American	ΗΓΕΜΟΝΕΣ ΕΝ ΑΝΘΡΩΠΟΙΣ ΕΙΝΑΙ, 'Leaders Among Men'	Active	
Lambda Pi	ΛΠ	1944–2004	Local	Independent	Traditional		Inactive	
**Lambda Sigma Upsilon**	ΛΣΥ	1979	National	NALFO, NIC	Latinos	Latinos Siempre Unidos, 'Latinos Always United'	Active	
**Lambda Theta Phi**	ΛΘΦ	1975	National	NALFO, NIC	Latino		Active	
**Lambda Upsilon Lambda**	ΛΥΛ	1982	National	NALFO	Latino	La Unidad Para Siempre, 'The Unity Forever'	Active	
**Nu Alpha Kappa**	ΝΑΚ	1988	National	NIC	Latino		Active	
**Nu Sigma Beta**	ΝΣΒ	1937	International	CIPFI	Puerto Rican		Active	
Nu Sigma Gamma	ΝΣΓ	1875–1876	Local	Yale University	Traditional, Sophomore		Inactive	
**Omega Delta Phi**	ΩΔΦ	1987	National	NIC	Multicultural		Active	
**Omega Phi Gamma**	ΩΦΓ	1995	National	Independent	Asian	ΦΙΝΙΡΕ ΑΔ ΗΟΝΟΣ, 'Bound by Honor'; ΕΜΕΡΓΕΡΕ ΣΥΠΕΡΝΕ ΟΜΝΙΣ, 'Rise Above All'	Active	
**Omega Psi Phi**	ΩΨΦ	1911	International	NPHC	African-American		Active	
**Omega Rho**	ΩΡ	1957–19xx ?; 1989§	Local	Independent			Active	
Omicron Alpha Tau	ΟΑΤ	1912–1934	National	NIC	Jewish		Inactive	(Note: Merged with Tau Delta Phi.)
**Omicron Kappa Epsilon**	ΟΚΕ	1834	Local	Independent	Traditional		Active	
**Pan Sophic**	PANS	1911	Local	Grove City College	Traditional	Brotherhood, Love, & Loyalty	Active	
Phi Alpha	ΦΑ	1914–1959	National	NIC	Jewish		Inactive	(Note: Merged with Tau Delta Phi.)
Phi Alpha Chi	ΦΑΧ	1883–1895	Local	Independent	Traditional		Inactive	(Note: Had chapters at Randolph-Macon University, Richmond College, and the University of Virginia.)
**Phi Alpha Pi**	ΦΑΠ	1861	Local	Independent	Traditional		Active	
Phi Beta Delta	ΦΒΔ	1912–1941	National	NIC	Traditional		Inactive	(Note: Merged with Pi Lambda Phi.)
**Phi Beta Epsilon**	ΦΒΕ	1890	Local	Independent	Traditional		Active	
**Phi Beta Sigma**	ΦΒΣ	1914	International	NPHC	African-American		Active	
**Phi Delta Alpha**	ΦΔΑ	1884	Local	Dartmouth College	Traditional		Active	
Phi Gamma Delta (Vernon Hall)	ΦΓΔ	1875	Local	Yale University	Traditional		Inactive	
**Phi Delta Gamma**	ΦΔΓ	1942	National	CIPFI	Puerto Rican		Active	
**Phi Delta Psi**	ΦΔΨ	1977	National	Independent	African-American		Active	
**Phi Delta Theta**	ΦΔΘ	1848	International	Independent	Traditional	Εἷς ἀνὴρ οὐδείς ἀνήρ, 'One man is no man'	Active	(Note: Formerly a member of NIC.) (Note: Originally nonsectarian.)
**Phi Epsilon Chi**	ΦΕΧ	1943	International	Independent	Puerto Rican	Yo soy Phi Epsilon de corazón, 'I am Phi Epsilon from the heart'	Active	
Phi Epsilon Pi	ΦΕΠ	1904–1970	International	NIC	Traditional		Inactive	(Note: Merged with Zeta Beta Tau.)
**Phi Eta Kappa**	ΦΗΚ	1906	Local	University of Maine	Traditional		Active	
**Phi Eta Mu**	ΦΗΜ	1923	National	CIPFI	Puerto Rican		Active	
**Phi Gamma Delta**	FIJI	1848	International	NIC	Traditional	Φιλότης Γλυκυτάτη Δυναστεία, 'Friendship, the Sweetest Influence'	Active	
**Phi Iota Alpha**	ΦΙΑ	1931	National	NIC, NALFO	Latino	Semper Parati Semper Juncti, 'Always ready always joined'	Active	
Phi Kappa	ΦΚ	1889–1959	National	NIC	Catholic		Inactive	(Note: Merged to create Phi Kappa Theta.)
Phi Kappa Nu	ΦΚΝ	1919–1924	Local	Samford University	Traditional		Inactive	
**Phi Kappa Nu**	ΦΚΝ	1975	Local	Cornell College	Traditional		Active	
**Phi Kappa Pi**	ΦΚΠ	1913	National (Canada)	Independent	Traditional	Φιλαδελφια Καναδαιοι Παιδευομεθα, 'We are raised Canadians in philadelphy'	Active	
**Phi Kappa Psi**	ΦΚΨ	1852	National	NIC	Traditional		Active	(Note: Originally a service fraternity.)
**Phi Kappa Sigma**	ΦΚΣ	1850	International	NIC	Traditional	Stellis Aequus Durando, 'Equal to the Stars in Endurance'	Active	(Note: Originally a secret order)
**Phi Kappa Tau**	ΦΚΤ	1906	National	NIC	Traditional	ΑΞΙΟΣ ΕΣΤΙ Η ΤΗΝ ΝΙΚΗΝ, 'Is worthy of the victory'	Active	
**Phi Kappa Theta**	ΦΚΘ	1889	National	NIC	Traditional	Give, expecting nothing thereof	Active	(Note: Originally a Catholic organization.)
Phi Lambda Alpha	ΦΛΑ	1919–1931	National	Independent	Latino		Inactive	(Note: Merged with Phi Iota Alpha.)
**Phi Lambda Chi**	ΦΛΧ	1925	National	NIC	Traditional		Active	
Phi Lambda Theta	ΦΛΘ	1920–1939	National	NIC	Odd Fellows		Inactive	(Note: Dissolved and dispersed to multiple fraternities.)
**Phi Mu Alpha Sinfonia**	ΦΜΑ	1898	National	NIMC	Music		Active	
**Phi Mu Delta**	ΦΜΔ	1918	National	NIC	Traditional		Active	(Note: Originally the Commons Club.)
Phi Pi Phi	ΦΠΦ	1915–1939	National	NIC	Traditional		Inactive	(Note: Merged with Alpha Sigma Phi.)
**Phi Rho Eta**	ΦΡΗ	1994	National	Independent	Traditional		Active	
**Phi Sigma Alpha**	ΦΣΑ	1928	International	CIPFI	Puerto Rican	OMNE RARUM CARUM, 'All that is rare is wanted'	Active	
Phi Sigma Delta	ΦΣΔ	1909–1969	National	NIC	Traditional		Inactive	(Note: Merged with Zeta Beta Tau.)
Phi Sigma Epsilon	ΦΣΕ	1910–1985	National	NIC, Association of Teachers College Fraternities	Traditional		Inactive	(Note: Merged with Phi Sigma Kappa.)
**Phi Sigma Kappa**	ΦΣΚ	1873	International	NIC	Traditional		Active	
**Phi Sigma Nu**	ΦΣΝ	1996	National	Independent	Native American		Active	
**Phi Sigma Phi**	ΦΣΦ	1988	National	NIC	Traditional	Φι Σιγμα Φι	Active	
Phi Theta Psi (Yale)	ΦΘΨ	1864–1875	Local	Yale University	Traditional, Sophomore		Inactive	
Phi Theta Psi	ΦΘΨ	1885–1895	Regional	Independent	Traditional		Inactive	
Pi Alpha Phi	ΠΑΦ	1929	National	NAPA	Asian American	Πι Αλφα Φι	Inactive	
**Pi Delta Psi**	ΠΔΨ	1994	National	NAPA	Asian		Active	
**Pi Kappa Alpha**	ΠΚΑ	1868	International	NIC	Traditional	φφκα	Active	
**Pi Kappa Phi**	ΠΚΦ	1904	National	NIC	Traditional	ΟΥΔΕΝ ΔΙΑΣΠΑΣΕΙ ΗΜΑΣ, 'Nothing shall tear us asunder'	Active	
**Pi Lambda Phi**	ΠΛΦ	1895	International	NIC	Traditional	NOSTROS AMEMUS, 'Love our own'	Active	
**Psi Sigma Phi**	ΨΣΦ	1990	National	NMGC	Multicultural		Active	(Note: ΨΥ is listed both among the fraternities and the co-educational groups.)
**Psi Upsilon**	ΨΥ	1833	International	NIC	Traditional	ΥΜΙΝ ΣΥΝΕΠΕΣΕ ΣΦΟΔΡΑ ΦΙΛΙΑ, 'Unto us has befallen a mighty friendship'	Active	(Note: Originally a literary society.) (Note: ΨΥ is listed both among the fraternities and the co-educational groups.)
**Seal and Serpent**		1905	Local	Cornell University	Traditional		Active	
Sigma Alpha	ΣΑ	1859–1882	Local	Roanoke College	Traditional		Inactive	
**Sigma Alpha Epsilon**	ΣΑΕ	1856	National	NIC	Traditional	ΣΙΓΜΑ ΑΛΦΑ ΕΨΙΛΟΝ	Active	
Sigma Alpha Kappa	ΣΑΚ	1923–2016	Local	Loyola University New Orleans	Traditional		Inactive	
Sigma Alpha Kappa	ΣΑΚ	19xx ?–2016	Local	Ferrum College	Traditional		Inactive	
**Sigma Alpha Kappa**	ΣΑΚ	1970	Local	Emory and Henry College	Traditional		Active	
**Sigma Alpha Mu**	ΣΑΜ	1909	International	NIC	Traditional	ΣΙΓΜΑ ΑΛΦΑ ΜΥ	Active	(Note: Originally a Jewish organization.)
**Sigma Beta**	ΣΒ		Local	University of New Hampshire	Traditional		Active	
**Sigma Beta Rho**	ΣΒΡ	1996	National	NIC, NAPA	Multicultural		Active	
**Sigma Chi**	ΣΧ	1855	International	NIC	Traditional	In Hoc Signo Vinces, 'In This Sign You Shall Conquer'	Active	(Note: Originally a literary society.)
Sigma Delta	ΣΔ	1845–1880	Local	Yale University	Traditional, Freshmen		Inactive	
**Sigma Delta Alpha**	ΣΔΑ	1992	National	Independent	Latino	Excelencia y Lealtad Entre Hermanos, 'Excellence and Loyalty Amongst Brothers'	Active	
Sigma Delta Rho	ΣΔΡ	1921–1935	National	NIC	Traditional		Inactive	(Note: Merged with Alpha Kappa Pi and dispersed to multiple fraternities.)
Sigma Iota	ΣΙ	1904–1931	International	Independent	Latin American		Inactive	(Note: Merged with Phi Iota Alpha.)
**Sigma Lambda Beta**	ΣΛΒ	1986	National	Independent	Latino		Active	
Sigma Lambda Pi	ΣΛΠ	1915–1932	National	Independent	Jewish		Inactive	(Note: Merged with Phi Epsilon Pi.)
**Sigma Nu**	ΣΝ	1869	International	NIC	Traditional	ΣΝΕΤΤ	Active	
**Sigma Phi Epsilon**	ΣΦΕ	1901	National	Independent	Traditional	Σίγμα Φί Ἕψιλόν	Active	(Note: Formerly a member of NIC.)
Sigma Phi Sigma	ΣΦΣ	1908–1947	National	Independent	Traditional		Inactive	(Note: Merged with Phi Sigma and dispersed to multiple fraternities.)
**Sigma Phi Society**	ΣΦ	1827	National	NIC	Traditional		Active	(Note: Originally a secret society.)
**Sigma Pi**	ΣΠ	1897	National	NIC	Traditional	ΣΕΒΑΣΤΗ ΠΙΣΤΗΣ, 'Reverend Faith'	Active	(Note: Formerly a member of NIC.) (Note: Originally a literary society.)
**Sigma Tau Gamma**	ΣΤΓ	1920	National	NIC	Traditional		Active	(Note: Originally a literary society.)
Sigma Tau Phi	ΣΤΦ	1918–1947	National	NIC	Jewish		Inactive	(Note: Merged with Alpha Epsilon Pi.)
**Sigma Thêta Pi**	ΣΘΠ	2003	International	Independent	Traditional	Fraternitas, animi excelsitas ac dignitas, 'Fraternity, height and dignity of the soul'	Active	
**Tau Delta Phi**	ΤΔΦ	1910	National	NIC	Traditional	ΤΑΥ ΔΕΛΤΑ ΦΙ	Active	
**Tau Epsilon Phi**	ΤΕΦ	1910	International	NIC	Traditional	Ταύ Εψιλόν Φί	Active	
**Tau Kappa Epsilon**	ΤΚΕ	1899	International	Independent	Traditional	παωεα	Active	(Note: Formerly a member of NIC.)
**Tau Phi Sigma**	ΤΦΣ	1992	National	NIC	Multicultural, social, and service		Active	
**Theta Chi**	ΘΧ	1856	International	FFC	Traditional	ΘΗΡΟΠΟΣΑ ΧΕΙΡ, 'Assisting Hand'	Active	
Theta Chi (Franklin Hall)	ΘΧ	1865–1935	Local	Yale University	Traditional, Freshmen		Inactive	
**Theta Delta Chi**	ΘΔΧ	1847	International	NIC	Traditional	ὀμόφρονα θυμόν ἔχοντες, 'Our Hearts Are United'	Active	(Note: Originally a secret society.)
Theta Kappa Nu	ΘΚΝ	1924–1939	National	NIC	Traditional		Inactive	(Note: Merged with Lambda Chi Alpha.)
Theta Kappa Phi	ΘΚΦ	1919–1959	National	NIC	Catholic		Inactive	(Note: Merged to create Phi Kappa Theta.)
Theta Upsilon Omega	ΘΥΩ	1923–1938	National	NIC	Traditional		Inactive	(Note: Merged with Sigma Phi Epsilon.)
**Theta Xi**	ΘΞ	1864	National	NIC	Traditional	Juncti Juvant, 'United they Serve'	Active	(Note: Originally an engineering fraternity.)
**Triangle Fraternity**		1907	National	NIC	Traditional	Veritas Omnia Vincit, 'Truth Conquers All'	Active	
**Zeta Beta Tau**	ΖΒΤ	1898	International	NIC	Traditional		Active	(Note: Originally a Jewish organization)
**Zeta Chi**	ΖΧ	1905	Local	Baker University	Traditional		Active	
Zeta Phi	ΖΦ	1870	Regional	Independent	Traditional		Inactive	
**Zeta Phi Rho**	ΖΦΡ	1995	National	Independent	Multicultural		Active	
**Zeta Nu**	ΖΝ	1956	Local	Clarkson University	Traditional	ΙΛΑΙΦΣΒΤΣ	Active	
**Zeta Psi**	ΖΨ	1847	International	NIC	Traditional		Active	

== Coeducational fraternities ==
Coeducational fraternities permit both male and female members. Active chapters are indicated in bold and inactive chapters are indicated in italics.

Organization	Symbols	Charter date and range	Scope	Affiliation (Note: Includes college or university for local fraternities.)	Type	Crest motto (Note: Any text in Greek or Latin writing contained within the crests. This does not necessarily correspond to the motto. A few are in Spanish or French. The orthography and punctuation are as depicted in the crest's writing, and are not necessarily grammatically correct.)	Status	Ref.
Alpha Theta	ΑΘ	1920	Local	Dartmouth College	Traditional		Active	(Note: Became coed in 1972.)
Alpha Delta Phi Society	ΑΔΦ	1832	National	Independent	Literary and traditional		Active	(Note: A chapter first became coed in 1973. The coed chapters split from a fraternity in 1992.)
Alpha Lambda Epsilon	ΑΛΕ	1922	Local	University of Olivet	Traditional		Active	(Note: Established as a sorority and became coed in 1975.)
Alpha Psi Lambda	ΑΨΛ	1985	National	NALFO	Latino		Active	(Note: Became coed in 1985.)
Gamma Sigma, the Georgian Society	ΓΣ	1947	Local	Rutgers University–New Brunswick	Traditional		Active	(Note: Formed as a local fraternity, joining Tau Epsilon Phi on December 19, 1965. It went coed in 1971 and returned to local status in 1985 when its charter was revoked for not returning to all-male status.)
Lambda Lambda Lambda	ΛΛΛ	2006	National	Independent	Traditional	Insisto Duodecim, 'Follow the Twelve'	Active	(Note: Established as a coed organization.)
Nu Alpha Phi	ΝΑΦ	1922	Local	Pomona College	Traditional		Active	(Note: Formed as a traditional fraternity, it began admitting women in 1977.)
Nu Delta	ΝΔ	1922	Local	Massachusetts Institute of Technology	Traditional		Active	(Note: Was founded as the Nu Delta Chapter of Phi Mu Delta, split in 1977.)
Phi Sigma Pi	ΦΣΠ	1916	National		Honor	Improving Humanity with Honor	Active	
Phi Tau	ΦΤ	1905–2020	Local	Dartmouth College	Traditional		Inactive	(Note: Became coed in 1972.)
Psi Upsilon	ΨΥ	1833	International	NIC	Traditional	ἨΜΊΝ ΣΥΝΈΠΕΣΕ ΣΦΟΔΡΆ ΦΙΛΊΑ, 'Unto us has befallen a mighty friendship'	Active	(Note: Its first chapter became coed in 1971. Today, seven of 27 chapters are coed.)
St. Anthony Hall (Delta Psi)	ΔΨ	1847	National	Independent	Literary		Active	(Note: This organization is listed as both fraternities and co-ed groups.) (Note: First chapter became coed in 1971. Today, most chapters are coed, but a few remain male-only.)
Sigma Mu Sigma	ΣΜΣ	1921	Regional	Independent	Traditional		Active	(Note: Became coed in 1984. Two chapters remain.)
The Tabard (Sigma Epsilon Chi)	ΣΕΧ	1857	Local	Dartmouth College	Traditional		Active	(Note: Became coed in 1972.)
Theta Delta Sigma	ΘΔΣ	2001	National	Independent	Multicultural	Θετα Δελτα Σεγμα	Active	(Note: Established as a coed organization.)
Theta Pi Sigma	ΘΠΣ	2005	Local	University of California, Santa Cruz	LGBTQ		Active	(Note: Established as a coed organization.)
Zeta Delta Xi	ΖΔΞ	1852	Local	Brown University	Traditional		Active	(Note: The First chapter became coed in 1982. Officially split from its national fraternity in 1986.)

== See also ==
- College fraternities and sororities
- List of social sororities and women's fraternities
- Cultural interest fraternities and sororities
- Fraternities and sororities in Canada
- List of fraternities and sororities in France
- List of fraternities and sororities in the Philippines
- List of fraternities and sororities in Puerto Rico
- Professional fraternities and sororities
- Service fraternities and sororities
