= Lambda Pi =

American social fraternity (1944–2004)

- ΛΠ
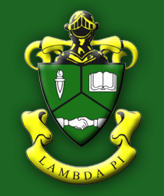
- Founded: 1944; 82 years ago California State University Chico
- Type: Social
- Affiliation: Independent
- Status: Defunct
- Scope: Local
- Motto: "Loyalty Prevails"
- Pillars: Brotherhood, Enlightenment, Loyalty, Scholarship
- Colors: Kelly Green and Skeeter White
- Philanthropy: Legacy Scholarships, CSUC Seufferlien Sales School
- Chapters: 1
- Members: 1,000 lifetime
- Nickname: The Pi's
- Headquarters: Chico, California; United States
- Website: https://lambda-pi.org/

Lambda Pi (ΛΠ) was a social fraternity at California State University, Chico in Chico, California. It was established in 1944. Lambda Pi was a local fraternity for over sixty years. The fraternity went inactive in 2004. However, the Lambda Pi Alumni Association remains active.

== History ==
In the fall of 1944, students Harry Estes, Wayne Gaskill, Don Greene, and Delbert Raby were pledging the only fraternity at Chico State University but withdrew because they objected to the required public initiation of pledges. They decided to create a new fraternity, Lambda Pi, and were joined by Vic Brownell, Ed Chew, Bill Fisk, Bob Herbert, Dick Hinton, Harry Humes, Jack Turner, and Marty Wood.

Its founders drafted a constitution for the new fraternity and submitted it to Aymer J. Hamilton, president of the college. Greene was elected the fraternity's first president. Dr. Hal Draper was the fraternity's first advisor.

While their former fraternity initiated its pledges during "Hell Week", the twelve Lambda Pi members attended campus events wearing a coat and tie with a Lambda Pi name badge. This gave the fraternity a positive image, leading to its growth and acceptance on campus. In future years, the fraternity replaced the hazing of Hell Week with "Help Week", where its pledges conducted a service project such as painting a local elementary school.

In the 1940s, fraternity members enjoyed social activities, including card games, skating parties, pledge dances, and ski trips. Members also participated in Pioneer Days in Chico, starting an annual fraternity tradition. In 1948, the fraternity started the annual Sweetheart of Chico College contest and dance.

The fraternity celebrated its first annual Founders Day on November 29, 1945. Lambda Pi formed its alumni chapter May 23, 1950, with Vic Brownell serving as its temporary president.

In 1999, the undergraduate chapter went inactive and stopped using the chapter house. The alumni association intervened, selling the chapter house. Lambda Pi received non-profit status in the fall of 1999 and began funding scholarships for Chico State students beginning in the fall of 2000. The alumni association purchased a new chapter house in 2000 and supported a revival of the undergraduate chapter with fourteen members.

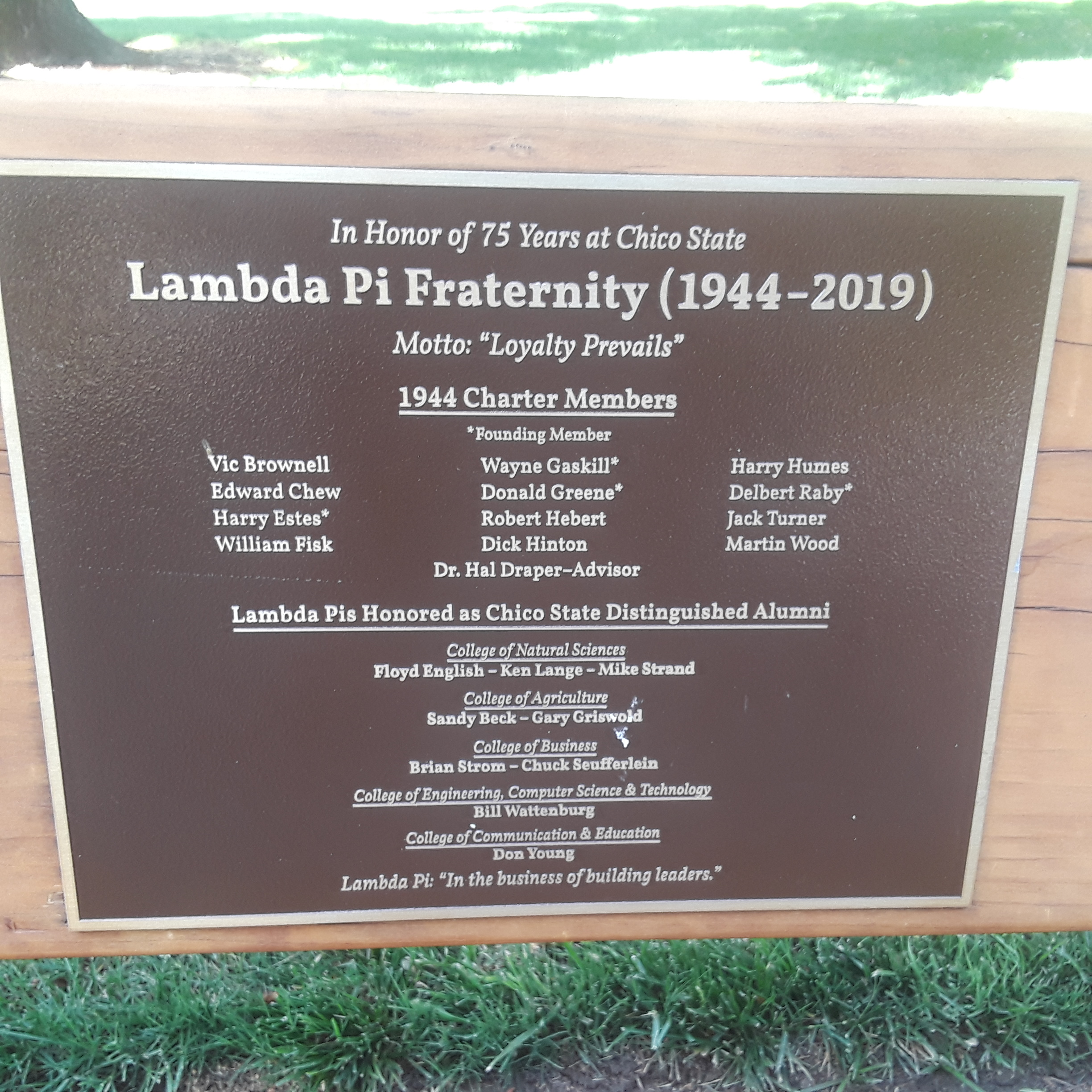
Plaque on the Lambda Pi bench

In the early 2000s, the Chico community's attitude had changed towards Greek life and Lambda Pi began having problems recruiting members. The undergraduate chapter notified the alumni association that it would no longer occupy the chapter house in 2004. At the May 2007 annual meeting of the alumni association voted to dissolve the college fraternity.

The Lambda Pi Alumni Association continues to be active. The Lambda Pi founders and distinguished alumni were honored with a bench on the California State University, Chico campus in 2019.

== Symbols ==
The motto of Lambda Pi was "Loyalty Prevails". The fraternity's core values or pillars were Brotherhood, Enlightenment, Loyalty, and Scholarship. Lambda Pi's colors were green and white. The fraternity debuted its green and white flag at its Founders Day banquet and dance on November 19, 1948.

The fraternity's pledges were presented with pledge pins. Members were initiated in a candlelight ceremony.

== Chapter houses ==
In its early years, Lambda Pi held social events at Bidwell Hall on campus. Later, the fraternity occupied four chapter houses.

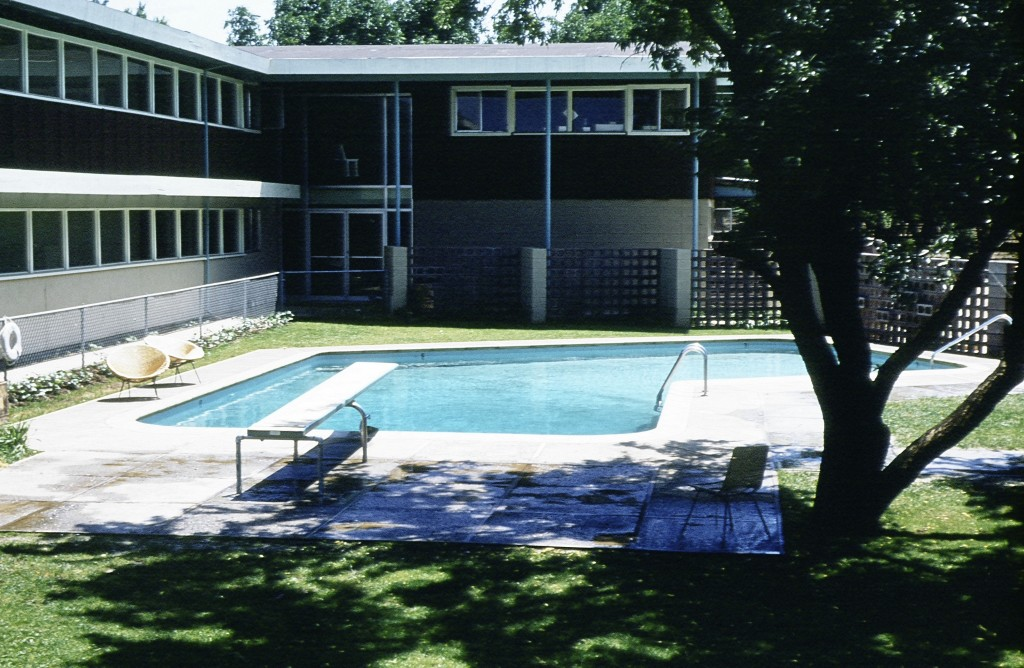
Oak Park Avenue chapter house

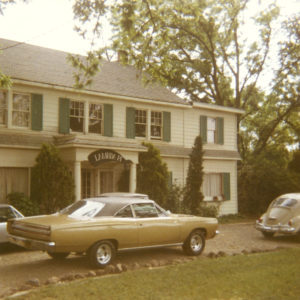
Chapter house at Sacramento Avenue

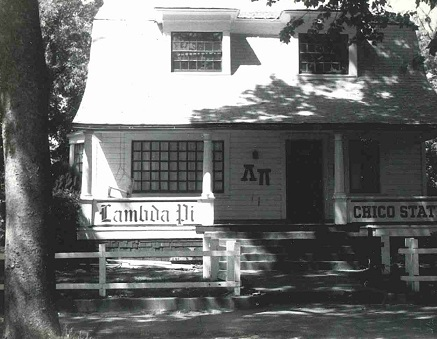
Third and Ivy Streets chapter house

=== Oak Park Avenue ===
The Oak Park Avenue house was the first official chapter house of Lambda Pi and the first fraternity house at the university. The fraternity's members built the house in starting in 1960 using funds the fraternity members raised and alumni donations. The project was supervised by Jim Moore, a contractor and fraternity alumni.

The outside framework of the house was designed after the letters Lambda and Pi. This 10,000 square feet (930 m^{2}) chapter house was situated on 2 acres (0.81 ha) and included an industrial kitchen, a recreation room, and a swimming pool shaped like the letter Lambda. It slept forty members in dormitory style. It was the most modern fraternity house in Northern California when it was finished. The chapter house was dedicated on April 10, 1961. The fraternity occupied the Oak Park Avenue house until 1967, leaving it because the active members disliked its dormitory style.

=== Sacramento Avenue ===
The fraternity's second chapter house was located at 1133 Sacramento Avenue. The fraternity's active members invested their dues on the stock market, earning enough for a down payment on the house in 1968. The American colonial style chapter house was situated on two acres and had seven bedrooms and a crud room upstairs. The house was destroyed by a fire caused by faulty wiring on May 5, 1975, resulting in $52,000 in damages. Several members survived the fire by jumping from the second story windows.

=== Third and Ivy ===
In 1975, Lambda Pi used the insurance money from the Sacramento Avenue house fire to purchase a house at Third and Ivy Streets for $48,000. The Dutch Colonial style house was built in 1902 by the White family and is part of a National Register Historic District. It had eights bedrooms and two bathrooms. When the active members abandoned the house, the alumni association sold the house for $130,000 in the fall of 1999.

=== Cedar Street House ===
In 2000, Lambda Pi alumni contributed $70,000 which was paired with the proceeds from the Third & Ivy house sale to purchase a new chapter house. Located near the corner of 5th and Cedar Streets, the house was painted green and white. The college chapter rented the house from the alumni association. This chapter house was occupied by Lambda Pi until 2004. The fraternity sold the former chapter house in 2023, after renting it to students.

== Philanthropy ==
Lambda Pi supports numerous charities. As early as January 1945, the fraternity contributed to the March of Dimes. In 2024, Lambda Pi gave $100,000 to the Seufferlein Sales Program of the Chico State's College of Business. The fraternity also helped numerous victims of the Camp Fire, Dixie Fire, Caldor Fire, and Park Fire.

The Lambda Pi Alumni Association established the B.E.L.S. Scholarship for the children and grandchildren of its alumni, now open to any member of the university-sanctioned Greek letter organization. B.E.L.S. stands for brotherhood/sisterhood, enlightenment, loyalty, and scholarship.

=== Notable members ===
- Danny Chauncy – member of the band 38 Special
- Mark Davis (honorary) – owner of the Las Vegas Raiders
- Dan Ostrander – presidential author
- Chuck Seufferlein – executive vice president and partner at Newmark Group
- The Tubes (honorary) – rock band
- Lani Waller – fishing guide and author
- Bill Wattenberg – inventor, engineer, author, and talk radio show host
- Don Young – United States House of Representatives for Alaska

=== CSUC distinguished alumni ===
The university has recognized nine members of Lambda Pi as distinguished alumni:

- Floyd English, Ken Lange, and Mike Strand – College of Natural Science
- Sandy Beck and Gary Griswold – College of Agriculture
- Brian Strom and Chuck Seufferlein – College of Business
- Bill Wattenberg – College of Computer Science & Technology
- Don Young – College of Communication and Education

== Controversies and member misconduct ==
In February 1961, a Black student at Chico State registered a formal complaint with the university after hearing a rumor that Black students would not be allowed to attend the annual Lamba Pi Sweetheart dance. The university convened a meeting when the fraternity and student reached an understanding that Black students were welcome to attend the dance. The fraternity gave the complaining student a free ticket to the dance. However, no Black students attended the dance, leading to new rumors that they had been denied admission. Investigations found that this was not the case; rather, Black students had been reluctant to attend the dance because it was held in Paradise, California, where Blacks had previously been "run out of town".

In May 1967, a party held at the Oak Park chapter house was attended by some 4,000 people. Attendees parked in a nearby orchard, leaving debris and damaging smudge pots. The fraternity assured the orchard's owners, who had contacted the police, that they would clean up the debris. Police also instructed the orchard owner to submit an invoice to the fraternity for damages.

On November 20, 1974, an eighteen year old female student claimed that she had been raped by at least four men at a party in the fraternity's chapter house. By January 1975, six men had been indicted for the crime in by a grand jury, including five fraternity members. In February, a superior court judge dismissed the charges of five of the men (four of the fraternity brothers) based on their attorney's arguments of insufficient evidence. However, a second indictment was issued for all six on March 12, 1975. All five fraternity brothers were acquitted in September 1975, successfully claiming that the woman was a willing participant. The university expelled two of the men from all University of California campuses, suspended another, an placed a fourth on probation. Chico State placed the fraternity on probation through the spring of 1976 for "failing to exercise adequate control over its social functions." This punishment prohibited the use of university facilities and not being able to participate campus and Pioneer Week activities; however, it was allowed to continue intramural and fundraising activities.

In March 1989, the university withdrew its recognition of Lambda Pi after an alumni and several student members were arrested for selling drugs in the fraternity's house.
