= Phi Theta Psi =

American college fraternity (1885–1895)

- ΦΘΨ
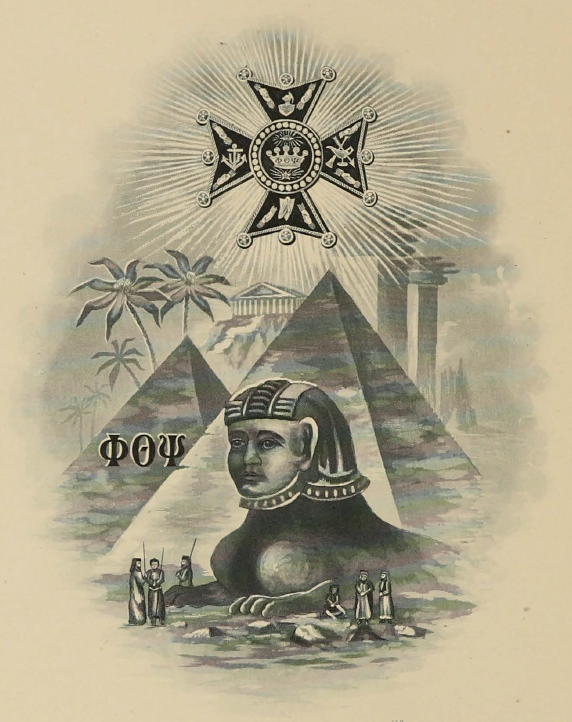
- Founded: 1886; 140 years ago Washington and Lee University
- Type: Social
- Affiliation: Independent
- Status: Defunct
- Defunct date: 1895
- Scope: National
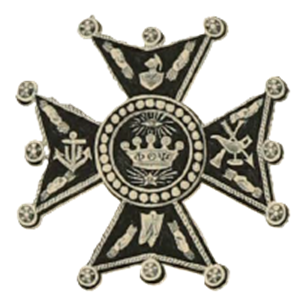
- Member badge
- Colors: Purple, Light blue and Gold
- Flower: Violet
- Publication: The Crown
- Chapters: 10+
- Headquarters: Lexington, Virginia; United States

Phi Theta Psi (ΦΘΨ) was an American collegiate fraternity. It was established in 1886 at Washington and Lee University in Lexington, Virginia. The fraternity established at least ten chapters, mostly in Virginia, before going inactive in 1895. Its Alpha chapter merged into Delta Tau Delta.

== History ==
Phi Theta Psi was a social fraternity established in 1886 at Washington and Lee University in Lexington, Virginia. One of its founders was George A. Wauchope, later a professor at the University of Missouri. A second chapter was established at the University of Virginia, followed by chapters at Richmond College and the College of William & Mary.

By 1890, the fraternity had initiated 170 members. It had established six chapters in Virginia by 1891. The fraternity became a national fraternity when it chartered Eta chapter at Kenyon College in Gambier, Ohio, and Theta chapter at Columbia College in New York City. In June 1892, the Iota chapter was established at Johns Hopkins University in Baltimore, Maryland. In October 1892, Iota had chapter rooms at 1035 North Eutaw Street.

The fraternity held a convention from December 28 to 30, 1892, in Richmond, Virginia. The fraternity's 1893 convention was held on December 28 and 29 in Richmond. Its first order of business was to send a telegram with greetings to Sigma Alpha Epsilon, its sister fraternity that was holding a convention in Pittsburgh, Pennsylvania. Other actions at the convention included securing contribution subscriptions for chapter houses, recalling charters for some charters, and granting charters for new chapters. The fraternity also decided to begin issuing its secret publication, The Crown, for general circulation. Its editor was alumnus Edward T. Boggs of Northport, New York.

Phi Theta Psi had seven active chapters in 1894, and also had an alumni association in Richmond. In May 1894, The Record of Sigma Alpha Epsilon noted that Phi Theta Psi was "in a flourishing condition".

In 1894, Phi Theta Psi explored merging into Sigma Alpha Epsilon, which had also chapters at the University of Virginia and Washington and Lee University. The merger plan included retaining the Phi Theta Psi chapter name at those two institutions because its chapters were larger. However, the two fraternities did not agree on minor details, and plans for the merger fell through.

In May 1895, Phi Theta Psi was disbanded by its general convention for unknown reasons. The active chapters at the time of dissolution were Alpha at Washington and Lee, Beta at the University of Virginia, Delta at William and Mary, and Zeta at Hampden–Sydney College.

The Alpha chapter withdrew and contacted Delta Tau Delta on December 6, 1895, about possibly becoming a chapter. At the time, Alpha had eight members, including one at the Virginia Military Institute. Six students at Washington and Lee sent a formal petition to Delta Tau Delta on January 11, 1896. Delta Tau Delta rejected Alpha's first application over concerns about the college; however, it accepted the second petition because of a strong desire to expand into the South. Alpha was installed as a chapter of Delta Tau Delta on August 17, 1896.

In early 1896, the former Delta chapter petitioned to become a chapter of Sigma Alpha Epsilon, but its request was denied. In September 1900, alumnus Rev. John G. Griffith unsuccessfully tried to motivate Phi Theta Psi alumni to place chapters at some Virginia colleges.

== Symbols ==
Phi Theta Psi's colors were purple, light blue, and gold. The fraternity's flower was the violet. Its publication was The Crown.

== Governance ==
Phi Theta Psi was governed by the executive board of its Crown Chapter or grand chapter, elected at its biennial conventions. Its grand president was called the G.W.D. It also had a grand vice-president, grand chaplain, secretary, assistant secretary, and sergeant-at-arms.

== Chapters ==
Following is an incomplete Phi Theta Psi chapter list, with inactive chapters indicated in italics.

| Chapter | Charter date and range | Institution | Location | Status | Ref. |
|---|---|---|---|---|---|
| Alpha | 1885 – May 1895 | Washington and Lee University | Lexington, Virginia | Withdrew (local, then ΔΤΔ) | (Note: Became a chapter of Delta Tau Delta.) |
| | Before 1890–189x ? | Roanoke College | Salem, Virginia | Inactive | |
| Beta | Before 1890 – May 1895 | University of Virginia | Charlottesville, Virginia | Inactive | |
| Gamma | February 17, 1890 – c. 1895 | Richmond College | Richmond, Virginia | Inactive | |
| Delta | March 1890 – May 1895 | College of William & Mary | Williamsburg, Virginia | Withdrew (local) | |
| Epsilon | Before September 1891 – c. 1895 | Randolph–Macon College | Ashland, Virginia | Inactive | |
| Zeta | 1890 – May 1895 | Hampden–Sydney College | Hampden Sydney, Virginia | Inactive | |
| Eta | Before 1893 – 189x ? | Kenyon College | Gambier, Ohio | Inactive | |
| Theta | Before 1893 – 189x ? | Columbia College | New York City, New York | Inactive | |
| Iota | June 1892 – c. 1894 | Johns Hopkins University | Baltimore, Maryland | Inactive | |
