= Delta Psi Delta (Linfield University) =

American college fraternity

- ΔΨΔ
- Founded: 1904; 122 years ago McMinnville College
- Type: Social
- Affiliation: Independent
- Status: Active
- Scope: Local
- Motto: "We are going through a course of training for the glory of the soul."
- Pillars: Fraternal Fellowship, Scholastic Attainment, Social Development, and Ethical Membership
- Colors: Dark Green and Old gold
- Mascot: rooster
- Publication: The Delta Scroll
- Chapters: 1
- Headquarters: 369 Southeast College Avenue; McMinnville, Oregon 97128; United States
- Website: deltapsidelta.org

Delta Psi Delta (ΔΨΔ) is a local fraternity established in 1904 at Linfield University in McMinnville, Oregon. It is the oldest local fraternity in the Pacific Northwest and was the first fraternity to be established at the university.

== History ==
Delta Psi Delta originated in 1904 at McMinnville College, now Linfield University, as the Dirty Dozen. The Dirty Dozen changed it name to Delta Psi Delta and adopted its current crest in 1913. It was the first fraternity to be established at the college and was a local organization, with no national affiliation.

The fraternity incorporated as Delta Psi Delta Corporation in 1952. In February 1954, around 100 alumni came to campus to celebrate the fraternity's fiftieth anniversary. It is the oldest local fraternity in the Pacific Northwest.

== Symbols ==
The Greek letters Delta Psi Delta were selected to stand for "undertaking a training for the glory of the soul". This related to the Delta Psi Delta's motto of "We are going through a course of training for the glory of the soul". Its values or pillars are fraternity fellowship, scholastic attainment, society development, and ethical membership.

Its colors are dark green and old gold. The fraternity's mascot, a rooster named Dlbwck, is featured on the fraternity's crest and serves as a symbol of unity and spirit. Its publication is The Delta Scroll.

== House ==
In 1953, Delta Psi Delta purchased its first house from Linfield University at 335 SE College Avenue. By 1960, the fraternity had outgrown its house. In 1963, the fraternity accepted bids to start construction on a new house designed by architect Prescott Coleman of Portland, Oregon, only to be stalled when all four bids came in at over their budget of $80,000.

In 1964, a groundbreaking ceremony was held for a new house next door at 369 Southeast College Avenue. Its actual construction started in the fall of 1965, with fraternity members and alumni volunteering their labor. This is the fraternity's current house cost $85,000 to build and was completed in 1966. By the time it was dedicated on May 15, 1966, the house had cost $100,000. The two-story house was built to accommodate thirty members and also has a 2,600 square foot basement with a chapter room and a recreational area. In the fall of 1966, the house had been expanded to house 46 members.

On October 31, 1970, a fire cause extensive damaged the second story of the fraternity's former house, which was still being used to house students. The original house remained next door until 1985, when it was demolished and part of its land was sold.

== Activities ==
Delta Psi Delta members engage in activities designed to encourage leadership, teamwork, and personal growth, including social events, study groups, community service projects, and intramural sports.

Its philanthropy is the See Ya Later Foundation. It also provides scholarships for its members.

== Member misconduct ==
In October 1954, a homemade flare exploded in the fraternity's backyard during a pre-rush party, resulting in one student being hospitalized and three others being injured. The flare was supposed to introduce the next segment of the event, and had been tested earlier that day. One of those injured was Luther Taylor, the fraternity's advisor and the head of the college's chemistry department.

== See also ==
- List of social fraternities
