= Zeta Delta Xi =

Local coed fraternity at Brown University

- ΖΔΞ
- Founded: January 24, 1987; 38 years ago Brown University
- Type: Social
- Affiliation: Independent
- Former affiliation: Zeta Psi
- Status: Active
- Emphasis: Co-educational
- Scope: Local
- Chapters: 1
- Nickname: Zetes
- Headquarters: 75 Waterman St, Box 1165; Providence, Rhode Island 02912; United States
- Website: www.zete.org

Zeta Delta Xi (ΖΔΞ or Zete) is a local, co-educational fraternity at Brown University in Providence, Rhode Island. It traces its origins to 1852 as the Epsilon chapter of the all-male national fraternity Zeta Psi. In 1982, the Epsilon chapter decided to admit women as brothers. This led to the chapter's disassociation from Zeta Psi in 1986, and the birth of Zeta Delta Xi on 24 January 1987. A shortened version of its name, "Zete", is commonly used to refer to the fraternity or a member.

== History ==
=== Origins as Zeta Psi ===
Zeta Delta Xi began life as the Epsilon chapter of the national, all-male fraternity Zeta Psi. "The Epsilon chapter was founded at Brown University on April 21, 1852, through the efforts of two Delta chapter Zetes, from the young chapter at Rutgers. In turn, shortly thereafter, on July 12, 1852, one of the charter members of Epsilon chapter founded Zeta Psi's Rho chapter at Harvard College." Epsilon was the eighth Zeta Psi chapter in the nation and the sixth fraternity to take root at Brown University. The chapter had varying success until it went inactive in 1876, but was reactivated ten years later on April 17, 1886.

For the next one hundred thirty years, the Epsilon chapter of Zeta Psi remained a fixture of life at Brown University. The activities of the Epsilon chapter during the late nineteenth and early twentieth centuries are rather poorly documented; however, it is known that three members were expelled from Brown University in 1876 for "voluptuous activities." In 1916 when "at Brown, the new quadrangle buildings arrangement threatened to abolish fraternities," Zeta Psi moved into a house at 48 College Street. This remained its quarters until the 1940s, when Zeta Psi IHQ sold their house to the university and expelled them from the organization, they then moved into on-campus housing around the newly constructed Wriston Quad. The old Zeta Psi house is now MacFarlane House and is home to the Classics Department at Brown University.

=== Going co-ed and the birth of Zeta Delta Xi ===
In 1982, the Epsilon chapter decided to expand its membership to include women. Although the Zeta Psi national organization acquiesced in the Epsilon chapter's decision to admit women as local members, it still refused to recognize women as members of the national organization because Zeta Psi's national constitution prohibited women from becoming brothers. Restricting women to local membership had two significant consequences: it barred women from participating in certain Zeta Psi ceremonies, and prohibited women from becoming officers within the local chapter.

The chapter's members nonetheless officially began considering women as full brothers (including electing women as officers) in defiance of Zeta Psi's national constitution. In 1986, they elected a female president and arranged to have her represent the chapter at the Zeta Psi national convention,"leaving no question about the full and legitimate membership of women". The national organization threatened to revoke the chapter's charter if it did not bring itself back into compliance with the national constitution. On December 10, 1986, the Epsilon chapter decided that it could not justify membership in a national fraternity that did not recognize all of its members, and voted unanimously to withdraw from Zeta Psi.

Within weeks after receiving the Epsilon chapter's letter of withdrawal, Zeta Psi declared the Epsilon chapter dead. Despite its long history, including the 1973 endowment of the Wright D. Heydon (Epsilon '11) Memorial Fund "for the benefit of the Epsilon chapter and such other educational purposes as the Foundation Trustees deemed appropriate," the national headquarters dispatched agents to collect nearly all property at the chapter house—ranging from couches and televisions to photographs of past members. "The total gift of $275,000 was to that time, and still remains to this day, the largest single gift ever received by Zeta Psi."

On 24 January 1987, all of the members of the Epsilon chapter formed a new organization known as Zeta Delta Xi: a local co-ed fraternity, independent of Zeta Psi. Its inclusive practices are reflected in the diversity of its pledge classes and membership rolls.

=== Zeta Delta Xi since 1987 ===
Since 1987, Zeta Delta Xi has thrived on campus, with a membership drawn from people of many diverse interests and backgrounds. In 1994, for instance, it was the first fraternity at Brown University to elect an openly gay man (Cristobal Modesto '95) as president.

Many Zetes continue their relationship with the house beyond their undergraduate years. Many of the alums make regular pilgrimages back to Zete in January, to celebrate the anniversary of their founding, and in May, to watch younger members graduate.

== Activities ==
- On Friday afternoon of Spring Weekend every year, Zete throws SpagFest - students spend several hours eating spaghetti and garlic bread and drinking beer, wine, and soda.
- Each year during commencement, current brothers and alumni gather on the steps of 48 College Street, the former fraternity house, to cheer the graduating seniors.
- Starting in 2005, Zete cooperated with Alpha Epsilon Pi, with whom they shared a building, to throw Oktoberfest, with hot dogs, kielbasa, and German beer.

== Notable members ==
- Kid Beyond (Andrew Chaikin), vocal artist and singer
- Brian Floca, children's book author and illustrator
- Aaron Schatz, founder of Football Outsiders
- Mike Zahalsky, contestant on Survivor Season 35, Survivor: Heroes vs. Healers vs. Hustlers
- Zanagee Artis, climate activist
