= Sigma Alpha (fraternity) =

American college fraternity (1850–1882)

- ΣΑ
- Coat of Arms of Sigma Alpha
- Founded: 1859; 167 years ago Roanoke College
- Type: Social
- Affiliation: Independent
- Status: Defunct
- Scope: National
- Motto: Εςτω Αφαήής
- Member badge
- Colors: Scarlet, Blue and Purple
- Symbol: Skull and crossbones, crossed swords
- Chapters: 16
- Members: 800+ lifetime
- Nickname: Black Badge
- Headquarters: Lynchburg, Virginia; United States

Sigma Alpha (ΣΑ) also known as the Black Badge, was an American collegiate fraternity. It was established in 1859 at Roanoke College in Salem, Virginia. The fraternity expanded to at least sixteen chapters before going inactive in 1882.

== History ==
Sigma Alpha was a social fraternity established in 1859 at Roanoke College in Salem, Virginia. Its founders were Thomas Carpenter, P. B. Gibson, C. R. Haden, J. K. Hardwicke, J. H. Irvine, R. H. Irvine, R. M. Jobe, B.C. Hartsook, R. M. Lawson, R. R. Lawson, J. R. Meek, G. A. Piper, B. S. Rice, and A. H. Turner. The fraternity went inactive during the American Civil War when Roanoke College closed.

Sigma Alpha was reestablished at Roanoke College in 1868. A second chapter was chartered at Hampden–Sydney College in 1869. It went on to form at least sixteen chapters, both collegiate and community-based chapters for alumni. According to William Raimond Baird, the community chapters "were found to be unsatisfactory", resulting in their charters being withdrawn in 1876, except for Omicron in Lynchburg, Virginia.

Omicron served as the fraternity's grand chapter. Its officers were called the D.G., S.D., G.S., A.G.S., and G.T. The fraternity held national conventions, with secret proceedings. On January 1, 1874, the convention was held in Lynchburg.

At Roanoke College, the fraternity sponsored an annual contest for the Orator's Gold Medal.

By 1879, the fraternity had initiated 800 members. Sigma Alpha collegiate chapters went inactive in 1882 for unknown reasons. However, its alumni chapter continued to operate into the 20th century.

== Symbols ==
Sigma Alpha was called Black Badge or Black Badge Fraternity because of the color of its badge. Its badge was a black enameled rectangle on top of a cross-shaped plate. On the vertical arms of the cross was the letter S and a skull and bones; on the horizonal arms were a pair of crossed swords. On top of the rectangle was a white diamond bearing the fraternity's motto Εςτω Αφαήής.

Its ritual was complicated and involved numerous degrees. The fraternity's colors were scarlet, blue, and purple.

== Chapters ==
Following are the known chapters of Sigma Alpha, with inactive chapters and institutions indicated in italics.

Chapter	Charter date and range	Institutions	Location	Status	Ref.
Alpha	1859–1864, 1868–1879	Roanoke College	Salem, Virginia	Inactive	
Beta	1869–1873	Hampden–Sydney College	Hampden Sydney, Virginia	Inactive	
Gamma	1871–1877	University of Virginia	Charlottesville, Virginia	Inactive	
Delta	1872–1876	(Community-based)	Bristol, Tennessee	Inactive	(Note: All community-based alumni chapters were closed in 1876, except Omicron which served as the fraternity's Grand Chapter.)
Epsilon	1873–1880	Virginia Agricultural and Mechanical College	Blacksburg, Virginia	Inactive	
Zeta	1873–1882	Salado College	Salado, Texas	Inactive	
Eta	1873–1882	Baltimore Medical College	Baltimore, Maryland	Inactive	
Theta	1873–1882	Washington and Lee University	Lexington, Virginia	Inactive	
Iota	1873–1882	King's College	Bristol, Tennessee	Inactive	
Kappa	1873–1876	(Community-based)	Lynchburg, Virginia	Inactive	
Lambda	1874–1876	(Community-based)	Galveston, Texas	Inactive	
Mu	1874–1876	(Community-based)	Wytheville, Virginia	Inactive	
Nu	1874–1876	(Community-based)	Marion, Virginia	Inactive	
Xi	1875–c. 1876	Somerville Institute	Noxubee County, Mississippi	Inactive	(Note: The institute closed in 1876.)
Omicron	1875–19xx ?	(Community-based)	Lynchburg, Virginia	Inactive	
Pi	1875–1876	(Community-based)	New Orleans, Louisiana	Inactive	

== See also ==
- List of social fraternities
