= Theta Kappa Nu =

American collegiate fraternity (1924–1939)

- ΘΚΝ
- Founded: June 9, 1924; 101 years ago Springfield, Missouri, US
- Type: Social
- Former affiliation: NIC
- Status: Merged
- Merge date: September 1, 1939
- Successor: Lambda Chi Alpha
- Scope: National
- Motto: Vir Quisque Vir Est "Every man is a man"
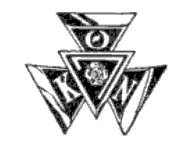
- Member badge
- Colors: Argent, Sable and Crimson
- Symbol: Syriac numeral eleven
- Flower: White Tudor Rose
- Publication: The Theta News
- Chapters: 55
- Members: ~7,000 lifetime
- Headquarters: Cleveland, Ohio; United States

Theta Kappa Nu (ΘΚΝ) fraternity was an American national collegiate fraternity founded in 1924 by delegates from eleven local fraternities. It merged with Lambda Chi Alpha in 1939.

== History ==
Winslow S. Anderson, a faculty member of Rollins College and founder of Tau Lambda local fraternity, had an idea for a new national fraternity to expand to large universities and small colleges in 1921.

In 1924, he found three like-minded men, Otho Robert McAtee of Springfield, Missouri, Jerry Homer Krenmyre, vice president of Iowa Wesleyan College, and Donald Fisher Lybarger, an attorney and founder of Phi Sigma. These men were members of three different local fraternities.

Theta Kappa Nu fraternity was founded when delegates from eleven local fraternities from nine different states united to form the new fraternity. The organizing meeting took place in Springfield, Missouri on June 9, 1924. The organizations included:

- Kappa Delta Psi at Iowa Wesleyan College
- Kappa Phi at Oklahoma City University
- Phi Alpha Sigma at Drury College
- Phi Beta Omega at Baker University
- Phi Kappa Nu at Howard College
- Phi Sigma at Gettysburg College
- Sigma Delta Chi at Simplson College
- Tau Lambda at Rollins College, the University of Florida, and North Carolina State University
- Tri Kappa at Hanover College

The representatives from the various organizations became the charter members of Theta Kappa Nu. The charter members were:

- Winslow S. Anderson, Tau Lambda
- Earl N. Arbaugh, Phi Alpha Sigma
- Paul Barnett, Phi Kappa Nu
- Paul R. Dick, Phi Beta Omega
- Raymond E. Doyle, Phi Sigma
- G. Lemuel Fenn, Kappa Phi
- William W. Frye, Kappa Delta Psi
- Leroy B. Hurd, Kappa Phi
- Charles A. Karnak, Phi Sigma
- J. H. Krenmyre, Kappa Delta Psi
- W. Harry Lennard, Phi Beta Omega
- Donald F. Lybarger, Phi Sigma
- Otho R. McAttee, Phi Alpha Sigma
- George Neely, Phi Kappa Nu
- W. H. Rockey, Sigma Delta Chi
- Henry Seaman, Tau Lambda
- Aaron F. Shreve, Tau Lambda
- J. Raymond Smith, Sigma Delta Chi
- Arthur A. Whitlatch, Tri Kappa
- Arthur H. Wilson, Tri Kappa

Anderson was selected as the fraternity's Grand Archon (chairman), McAttee was the Grand Scribe (secretary), Lybarder was the Grand Treasurer, and Krenmyre was the Grand Oracle. Anderson, Krenmyre, Lybarger, and McAtee drafted its constitution, ritual, and business system. On October 11, 1924, where the local chapters officially changed their names with an installation ceremony, along with a "badging out ceremony" held where members received their Theta Kappa Nu badge. In the meantime, the first charter was granted to Missouri Beta at Westminster College on October 6, 1924.

Theta Kappa Nu had, over its first decade, become the fastest-growing fraternity until that time, chartering forty chapters with almost 2,500 initiates by the close of 1926. Most of Theta Kappa Nu's chapters were established at small, private colleges as local fraternities.

The fraternity placed great emphasis on academics, offering graduate scholarships throughout its history, even during dire financial crises. Its quarterly magazine was The Theta News. Its headquarters were in Cleveland, Ohio.

The Great Depression significantly impacted the small colleges where most Theta Kappa Nu chapters were located. Expansion nearly ceased and chapters began closing in the early 1930s. The Grand Council reduced membership fees in 1933 and 1935 with hopes of maintaining its membership, covering the reduction in income from its "permanent fund". Over seven years, the fraternity's permanent fund was reduced from $28,500 to $12,200. By the end of the decade, fraternity leaders realized that a merger with another fraternity was necessary to continue solvency.

=== Merger with Lambda Chi Alpha ===
On September 1, 1939, Lambda Chi Alpha merged with the Theta Kappa Nu in what was regarded as the largest fraternity merger to date.

== Symbols ==
Theta Kappa Nu Pledge Pin

The fraternity's colors were argent, sable, and crimson. Its flower was the white Tudor rose. Its motto was Vir Quisque Vir Est or "Every man is a man". Its flag featured three horizontal stripes–white on top, crimson in the center, and black on the bottom–with gold letters "ΘΚΝ" on top, diagonally from upper left to bottom right.

The Theta Kappa Nu badge consisted of three equilateral triangles that were joined at their top, underneath a fourth triangle. The triangles are filled with black enamel and have one of the Greek letters "Θ", "Κ", or "Ν" in gold on the outer triangles. The inner triangle features a Tudor rose and a mystical symbol. The badge can be jeweled with pearls and diamonds. The fraternity's pledge pin was a silver circle with four raised black enameled triangles, separated by crossed silver bars. The fraternity also had a recognition pin for alumni and active members; it was a small coat of arms in either silver or gold.

The coat of arms featured a shield with eleven chevrons in argent and sable, with a red inescutcheon in the center. Above, is a red lion rampant holding a white rose. Benneath the shield, is a scroll with the motto Vir Quisque Vir Est. It was designed by Emily Helen Butterfield.

== Alumni clubs ==
Theta Kappa Nu had alumni clubs in Birmingham, Alabama; Chicago, Illinois; Cleveland, Ohio; Detroit, Michigan; DeMoines, Iowa; Indianapolis, Indiana; Kansas City, Missouri; Los Angeles, California; New York City, New York; Pittsburgh, Pennsylvania; Portland, Oregon; Richmond, Virginia; St. Louis, Missouri; Shreveport, Louisiana; Springfield, Missouri; and, Washington, D.C.

== Notable members ==
- Ernest R. Breech (Missouri Alpha), business executive with Ford Motor Company and Trans World Airlines
- Forrest C. Donnell, Governor of Missouri and United States Senator
- Jimmy Doolittle (California Alpha) United States Air Force general and Medal of Honor recipient
- Dabbs Greer, flm character actor
- Amos W. Jackson, judge on the Indiana Supreme Court
- Abe Mickal, football player
- James Tilghman Lloyd, United States House of Representatives
- Edwin Markham, poet
- George S. Sexton, president of Centenary College of Louisiana
- Joseph Truskowski, college athlete and head baseball coach at Iowa State and Wayne State
- Means Wilkinson, (Arkansas Alpha), Speaker of the Arkansas House of Representatives
- John H. Wood, president of Culver–Stockton College

== See also ==
- List of social fraternities
