= List of University of Illinois Urbana-Champaign fraternities and sororities =

The List of the University of Illinois Urbana-Champaign fraternities and sororities currently consists of more than 59 fraternities and 36 sororities on the campus of the University of Illinois Urbana-Champaign. Of the approximately 30,366 undergraduates, 3,463 are members of sororities and 3,674 are members of fraternities, which is 23.5%. The Greek system at the University of Illinois has a system of self-government. While there are staff advisors and directors in charge of managing certain aspects of the Greek community, most of the day-to-day operations of the Greek community are governed by the Interfraternity Council and Panhellenic Council. Many of the fraternity and sorority houses on campus are on the National Register of Historic Places.

== List of social fraternities and sororities ==
List of social fraternities and sororities at the University of Illinois Urbana-Champaign.

Active Fraternities

Active Women's Fraternities and Sororities

- Acacia – 1906
- Alpha Delta Phi – 1911
- Alpha Epsilon Pi – 1920
- Alpha Gamma Rho – 1906
- Alpha Gamma Sigma – 1981
- Alpha Iota Omicron – 2002
- Alpha Phi Alpha – 1917
- Alpha Psi Lambda – 1988
- Alpha Sigma Phi – 1908
- Alpha Tau Omega – 1895
- Beta Chi Theta – 2010
- Beta Sigma Psi – 1925
- Chi Psi – 1912
- Chi Sigma Tau – 2007
- Delta Chi – 1923
- Delta Kappa Epsilon – 1904
- Delta Sigma Phi – 1919
- Delta Tau Delta – 1872
- Delta Upsilon – 1905
- FarmHouse – 1914
- Kappa Alpha Psi – 1913
- Kappa Delta Rho – 1921
- Kappa Pi Beta – 2018
- Kappa Sigma – 1891
- Lambda Chi Alpha – 1915
- Lambda Phi Epsilon – 1997
- Lambda Theta Phi – 2004
- Lambda Upsilon Lambda – 2006
- Omega Delta – 1997
- Omega Delta Phi – 2005
- Tau Kappa Epsilon - 1912

- Omega Psi Phi – 1929
- Phi Delta Theta – 1893
- Phi Gamma Delta – 1897
- Phi Iota Alpha – 2014
- Phi Kappa Psi – 1904
- Phi Kappa Sigma – 1892
- Phi Kappa Tau – 1916
- Phi Kappa Theta – 1912
- Phi Mu Alpha Sinfonia - 1925
- Phi Rho Eta – 1997
- Phi Sigma Kappa – 1910
- Pi Kappa Alpha – 1917
- Pi Kappa Phi – 1921
- Pi Lambda Phi – 1934
- Psi Upsilon – 1910
- Sigma Alpha Epsilon – 1899
- Sigma Alpha Mu – 1918
- Sigma Beta Rho- 2008
- Sigma Chi – 1881
- Sigma Lambda Beta – 1991
- Sigma Nu – 1902
- Sigma Phi Delta – 1928
- Sigma Phi Epsilon – 1903
- Sigma Pi – 1908
- Sigma Tau Gamma – 1953
- Theta Chi – 1916
- Theta Xi – 1922
- Triangle Fraternity – 1907
- Zeta Beta Tau – 1912
- Zeta Psi – 1909

- 4-H House – 1934
- Alpha Chi Omega – 1899
- Alpha Delta Pi – 1912
- Alpha Epsilon Phi – 1909
- Alpha Gamma Delta – 1918
- Alpha Kappa Alpha – 1914
- alpha Kappa Delta Phi – 2000
- Alpha Omega Epsilon – 1999
- Alpha Omicron Pi – 1911
- Alpha Phi – 1922
- Alpha Pi Sigma – 2012
- Alpha Xi Delta – 1905
- Chi Omega – 1900
- Delta Delta Delta – 1920
- Delta Gamma – 1906
- Delta Kappa Delta – 2006
- Delta Phi Omega – 2014 (colonization)
- Delta Sigma Theta – 1932
- Delta Xi Phi – 1994

- Delta Zeta – 1921
- Gamma Phi Beta – 1913
- Gamma Phi Omega – 2004
- Kappa Alpha Theta – 1895
- Kappa Delta – 1921
- Kappa Delta Chi – 2012
- Kappa Kappa Gamma – 1899
- Kappa Phi Lambda – 2006
- Lambda Theta Alpha – 2001
- Lambda Pi Upsilon - 2004
- Phi Mu – 1921
- Phi Sigma Rho – 2013
- Phi Sigma Sigma – 1923
- Pi Beta Phi – 1895
- Sigma Alpha – 2000
- Sigma Delta Tau – 1926
- Sigma Gamma Rho – 1969
- Sigma Iota Alpha – 1997
- Sigma Psi Zeta – 2012
- Zeta Phi Beta – 1972
- Gamma Phi Delta – 2008
