= List of Texas State University fraternities and sororities =

Texas State University is a public university in San Marcos, Texas. In the following lists, its fraternities and sororities are organized by national umbrella organizations.

== National Association of Latino Fraternal Organizations ==
The following fraternities and sororities at Texas State are members of the National Association of Latino Fraternal Organizations. Active organizations are indicated in bold; inactive organizations are in italics.

| Organization | Chapter | Charter date and range | Type | Status | Ref. |
|---|---|---|---|---|---|
| Alpha Psi Lambda | Pi | 2003–20xx ? | Co-ed fraternity | Inactive | |
| **Chi Upsilon Sigma** | Alpha Upsilon Emerging | 2006 | Sorority | Active | |
| Lambda Upsilon Lambda | Alpha Theta | 2001–20xx ? | Fraternity | Inactive | |
| Phi Iota Alpha | Alpha Omicron | 2006–20xx ? | Fraternity | Inactive | |
| **Sigma Iota Alpha** | Alpha Upsilon | 2011 | Sorority | Active | |

== National Multicultural Greek Council ==
The following fraternities and sororities at Texas State are members of the National Multicultural Greek Council. Active organizations are indicated in bold; inactive organizations are in italics.

| Organization | Chapter | Charter date and range | Type | Status | Ref. |
|---|---|---|---|---|---|
| **Alpha Sigma Rho** | Mu Associate | 2020 | Sorority | Active | |
| Delta Xi Nu | Lambda | 2016 | Sorority | Inactive | |
| **Kappa Delta Chi** | Omicron | 1998 | Sorority | Active | |
| **Lambda Delta Psi** | Epsilon colony | 2021 | Sorority | Active | |
| **Omega Delta Phi** | Rho | 1997 | Fraternity | Active | |
| Phi Iota Alpha | Alpha Omicron | 1996–2022 ? | Sorority and fraternity | Inactive | |
| **Sigma Delta Lambda** | Alpha | 1996 – April 2016, 202x ? | Sorority | Active | (Note: Chapter suspended from April 2016 to fall 2021 for an unspecified reason.) |
| **Sigma Lambda Beta** | Sigma Beta | 2002 | Fraternity | Active | (Note: Chapter formed as a colony in 1998.) |
| **Sigma Lambda Gamma** | Xi Alpha | 1998 | Sorority | Active | |

== National Pan-Hellenic Council ==
The following historically African American fraterties and sororities at Texas State are members of the National Pan-Hellenic Council. Active organizations are indicated in bold; inactive organizations are in italics.

| Organization | Chapter | Charter date and range | Type | Status | Ref. |
|---|---|---|---|---|---|
| Alpha Kappa Alpha | Sigma Epsilon | 1973–xxxx ?, 2000 | Sorority | Active | |
| Alpha Phi Alpha | Mu Nu | 1976 | Fraternity | Active | |
| Delta Sigma Theta | Iota Omega | 1972 | Sorority | Active | |
| Kappa Alpha Psi | Lambda Theta | 1982 | Fraternity | Active | |
| Omega Psi Phi | Xi Delta | 1972 – April 2015; 2021 | Fraternity | Active | (Note: The chapter was suspended April 2015 to fall 2020 for an unspecified reason.) |
| Phi Beta Sigma | Pi Xi | 1983 | Fraternity | Active | |
| Sigma Gamma Rho | Mu Phi | 1992–xxxx ?, 2016 | Sorority | Active | |
| Zeta Phi Beta | Omicron Xi | 1991 | Sorority | Active | |
| Iota Phi Theta | Iota Theta | 2024 | Fraternity | Active | |

== National Panhellenic Conference ==
The following sororities and women's fraternities at Texas State are members of the National Panhellenic Conference. Active organizations are indicated in bold; inactive organizations are in italics.

| Organization | Chapter | Charter date and range | Status | Ref. |
|---|---|---|---|---|
| **Alpha Delta Pi** | Epsilon Zeta | 1966 | Active | (Note: Chapter formed from Delta Sigma Delta, a local sorority established in 1903.) |
| **Alpha Gamma Delta** | Kappa Epsilon | 2017 | Active | |
| Alpha Omicron Pi | Zeta Kappa | 1992–2002 | Inactive | (Note: Chapter formed as a colony in 1989.) |
| Alpha Phi | Zeta Kappa | 1979–1989 | Inactive | |
| **Alpha Xi Delta** | Delta Psi | 1965 | Active | (Note: Chapter formed from Phi Delta Gamma, a local sorority established in 1923.) |
| **Chi Omega** | Alpha Zeta | 1964 | Active | (Note: Chapter formed from Theta Psi Delta, a local sorority established in 1903.) |
| **Delta Gamma** | Zeta Eta | 1988 | Active | (Note: Chapter formed from Delta Kappa Pi, a local sorority established in 1985. Later, it also absorbed Omega Xi.) |
| **Delta Zeta** | Iota Alpha | 1964 | Active | (Note: Chapter formed from Alpha Delta Ch, a local sorority established in 1926.) |
| **Gamma Phi Beta** | Gamma Chi | 1968–1991, 2013 | Active | (Note: Chapter formed from Rho Phi Epsilon, a local sorority established in 1965.) |
| Sigma Kappa | Epsilon Omicron | 1969–1984 | Inactive | |
| **Zeta Tau Alpha** | Theta Psi | 1980 | Active | |

== North American Interfraternity Conference ==
The following fraternities at Texas State are members of the North American Interfraternity Conference. Active organizations are indicated in bold; inactive organizations are in italics.

| Organization | Chapter | Charter date and range | Status | Ref. |
|---|---|---|---|---|
| **Alpha Sigma Phi** | Theta Iota | 2017 | Active | |
| Alpha Tau Omega | Iota Alpha | 1986–January 2017 | Inactive | (Note: Chapter suspended from January 2017 to spring 2020 for hazing and non-hazing violations.) |
| **Beta Upsilon Chi** | Zeta | 1997 | Active | |
| Delta Chi | Texas State University–San Marcos | 1994–2010 | Inactive | |
| **Delta Sigma Phi** | Theta Eta | 1994–199x ?; 2017 | Active | |
| Delta Tau Delta | Zeta Delta | 1970–January 2017 | Inactive | (Note: Chapter formed from Sigma Chi Epsilon, a local fraternity established in 1967. It was suspended from January 2017 to spring 2022 for hazing and non-hazing violations.) |
| Delta Upsilon | SW Texas | 1972–1977 | Inactive | (Note: Chapter formed from Alpha Delta Upsilon, a local fraternity established in 1969.) |
| Kappa Alpha Order | Epsilon Iota | 1979–January 2017 | Active | (Note: Chapter suspended from January 2017 to spring 2021 for hazing and non-hazing violations.) |
| **Kappa Sigma** | Theta Lambda | 1966–1987, 1990–1999, 200x ? | Active | (Note: Chapter from Alpha Psi Lambda, a local fraternity established in 1957.) |
| Lambda Chi Alpha | Lambda Phi | 1966–2011 | Inactive | (Note: Chapter formed from Kappa Sigma Alpha, a local fraternity established in 1962.) |
| **Lambda Theta Phi** | Beta Rho | 2004 | Active | |
| **Phi Delta Theta** | Texas Mu | 1980–1997, 2002–2012, 2023 | Active | |
| **Phi Gamma Delta** | Sigma Upsilon | 1990–1996, 2020 | Active | (Note: Chapter reformed as a colony in 2016.) |
| **Pi Kappa Phi** | Eta Rho | 1996–2020, 2025 | Active | |
| Phi Kappa Psi | Texas Gamma | 1969–1993, 200x ?–2017 | Inactive | (Note: Chapter formed from Delta Phi Theta, a local fraternity established in 1966.) |
| **Phi Kappa Sigma** | Gamma Mu | 1988–1992; 2021 | Active | |
| Phi Kappa Tau,. | Gamma Psi | 1968–September 2016 | Inactive | (Note: Chapter suspended from September 2016 to fall 2017 for an unspecified reason.) |
| Phi Kappa Theta | Texas Beta Sigma | 1987–xxxx ? | Inactive | (Note: Chapter formed as a colony in 1984.) |
| Phi Sigma Kappa | Rho Septaton | 1999–2007 | Inactive | |
| **Pi Kappa Alpha** | Zeta Theta | 1965–2005, 2010–January 2017, 2021 | Active | (Note: Chapter formed from Pi Sigma Chi, established in 1904. It was suspended from January 2017 to spring 2019 for hazing and non-hazing violations.) |
| **Sigma Alpha Epsilon** | Texas Sigma | 1994–2003, 2012 | Active | |
| **Sigma Chi** | Theta Tau | 1986–1999; 2009 | Active | (Note: Chapter formed from Phi Sigma Chi, a local fraternity originally formed in 1984; It reformed from Phi Sigma Chi, established in 2007.) |
| **Sigma Nu** | Eta Tau | 1966 | Active | (Note: Chapter formed from Kappa Tau Delta, a local fraternity established in 1931.) |
| Sigma Phi Epsilon | Texas Tau | 1981 | Active | |
| Sigma Pi | Theta Upsilon | 2006–2010 | Inactive | |
| Sigma Tau Gamma | Delta Epsilon | 1983–2019 | Inactive | |
| Tau Kappa Epsilon | Xi Xi | 1972–2015 | Inactive | (Note: Chapter formed from Delta Sigma Lambda, a local fraternity established in 1968.) |
| **Theta Chi** | Iota Upsilon | 2014 | Active | |
| Theta Xi | Beta Tau | 1965–1992 | Inactive | (Note: Chapter formed from Theta Sigma Chi, a local fraternity established in 1963.) |

== Other organizations ==
The following are service or non-affiliated fraternities and sororities at Texas State. Active organizations are indicated in bold; inactive organizations are in italics.

| Organization | Chapter | Charter date and range | Type | Status | Ref. |
|---|---|---|---|---|---|
| **Mu Epsilon Theta** | Beta | 1997 | Sorority, service | Active | |
| Phi Beta Chi | Pi | 2002–201x ? | Sorority, Lutheran heritage | Inactive | |
