= List of Arizona State University fraternities and sororities =

This is a list of Arizona State University fraternities and sororities, organized by their national umbrella organizations. In 2026, the university recognized more than 65 Greek letter organizations. More than 6,200 undergraduate students belonged to a fraternity or sorority during the 2024–25 academic year. In the fall of 2022, 8% of the male undergraduate students belonged to a fraternity, and 10% of the undergraduate females belonged to a sorority.

== Interfraternity Council ==
The Interfraternity Council has the following fraternities on campus.

- Acacia Fraternity
- Alpha Epsilon Pi
- Alpha Kappa Lambda
- Alpha Sigma Phi
- Alpha Tau Omega
- Delta Tau Delta
- Kappa Alpha Order
- Kappa Delta Rho
- Lambda Chi Alpha
- Phi Delta Theta
- Phi Gamma Delta (FIJI)
- Phi Kappa Psi
- Phi Kappa Tau
- Phi Kappa Theta
- Pi Kappa Alpha
- Pi Kappa Phi
- Sigma Alpha Epsilon
- Sigma Alpha Mu
- Sigma Nu
- Sigma Pi
- Sigma Tau Gamma
- Theta Chi
- Theta Delta Chi
- Theta Xi
- Zeta Beta Tau

== Multicultural Greek Council ==
The Multicultural Greek Council has the following members on campus.

- Alpha Kappa Delta Phi (sorority)
- Alpha Phi Gamma (sorority)
- Alpha Pi Omega (sorority)
- Beta Chi Theta (fraternity)
- Delta Chi Lambda (sorority)
- Gamma Rho Lambda (sorority)
- Lambda Sigma Gamma (sorority)
- Omega Delta Phi (fraternity)
- Pi Lambda Chi (sorority)
- Sigma Lambda Beta (fraternity)
- Sigma Lambda Gamma (sorority)
- Tau Psi Omega (fraternity)

== National Association of Latino Fraternal Organizations ==
The National Association of Latino Fraternal Organizations has the following members on campus.

- Gamma Alpha Omega (Sorority)
- Kappa Delta Chi (Sorority)
- Lambda Sigma Upsilon (Fraternity)
- Lambda Theta Nu (Sorority)
- Mu Sigma Upsilon (Sorority)
- Phi Iota Alpha (fraternity)

== National Pan-Hellenic Council ==
The National Pan-Hellenic Council has the following members on campus.

- Alpha Kappa Alpha (sorority)
- Alpha Phi Alpha (fraternity)
- Delta Sigma Theta (sorority)
- Kappa Alpha Psi (fraternity)
- Omega Psi Phi (fraternity)
- Phi Beta Sigma (fraternity)
- Sigma Gamma Rho (sorority)
- Zeta Phi Beta (sorority)

== Panhellenic Council ==
The Panhellenic Council has the following sororities on campus.

- Alpha Chi Omega
- Alpha Epsilon Phi
- Alpha Omicron Pi
- Alpha Phi
- Chi Omega
- Delta Gamma
- Delta Sigma
- Delta Zeta
- Kappa Alpha Theta
- Kappa Delta
- Kappa Kappa Gamma
- Pi Beta Phi
- Phi Sigma Rho
- Sigma Kappa
