= List of Syracuse University fraternities and sororities =

Greek life at Syracuse University began in 1871 with the installation of the men's fraternity Delta Kappa Epsilon. The first sorority was the alpha chapter of Alpha Phi, which was launched on September 18, 1872. Today, the Syracuse University fraternity and sorority system offers organizations under the National Panhellenic Council, the North American Interfraternity Conference (IFC), the National Association of Latino Fraternal Organizations, the National Multicultural Greek Council, the National Pan-Hellenic Council, and the Professional Fraternity Association.

Following is a list of Syracuse University fraternities and sororities.

== National Association of Latino Fraternal Organizations ==
The National Association of Latino Fraternal Organizations at Syracuse includes the following fraternities and sororities.

- Lambda Alpha Upsilon, fraternity
- Lambda Pi Chi, sorority
- Lambda Sigma Upsilon, fraternity
- Lambda Theta Alpha, sorority
- Lambda Upsilon Lambda, fraternity
- Omega Phi Beta, sorority
- Phi Iota Alpha, fraternity
- Sigma Iota Alpha, sorority
- Sigma Lambda Upsilon, sorority

== National Multicultural Greek Council ==
The National Multicultural Greek Council at Syracuse includes the following fraternities and sororities.

- alpha Kappa Delta Phi (2019), Asian-interest sorority
- Kappa Phi Lambda (1997), Asian-interest society
- Lambda Phi Epsilon (2015), Asian American-interest fraternity
- Nu Alpha Phi (2007–2015); currently on suspension
- Sigma Beta Rho (2011), multicultural fraternity
- Sigma Psi Zeta (2018), multicultural sorority

== National Pan-Hellenic Council ==
The National Pan-Hellenic Council at Syracuse includes the following historically African American fraternities and sororities:

- Alpha Phi Alpha, fraternity
- Alpha Kappa Alpha, sorority
- Delta Sigma Theta, sorority
- Iota Phi Theta, fraternity
- Kappa Alpha Psi, fraternity
- Omega Psi Phi, fraternity
- Phi Beta Sigma, fraternity
- Sigma Gamma Rho, sorority
- Zeta Phi Beta, sorority

== National Panhellenic Council ==
The National Panhellenic Council at Syracuse includes the following social sororities:

- Alpha Chi Omega
- Alpha Epsilon Phi
- Alpha Gamma Delta (Alpha chapter)
- Alpha Phi (Alpha chapter)
- Alpha Xi Delta
- Delta Delta Delta
- Delta Gamma
- Delta Phi Epsilon
- Gamma Phi Beta (Alpha chapter)
- Kappa Alpha Theta
- Kappa Kappa Gamma
- Phi Sigma Sigma
- Sigma Delta Tau

== North American Interfraternity Conference ==
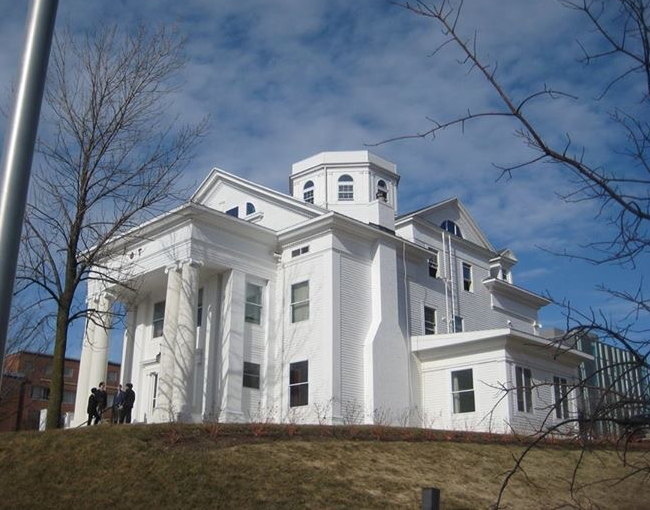
Psi Upsilon chapter house at Syracuse University

The IFC at Syracuse includes the following social fraternities:

- Alpha Epsilon Pi (1947, 2002, 2024)
- Delta Chi (1899–1967, 2001)
- Delta Kappa Epsilon (1871)
- Delta Tau Delta (1910, 2023)
- Delta Upsilon (1891, 2016)
- Lambda Chi Alpha (1918, 2014)
- Phi Kappa Psi (1884)
- Phi Kappa Theta (1925, 2001)
- Pi Kappa Alpha (1913, 2024)
- Pi Kappa Phi (2024)
- Psi Upsilon (1875)
- Sigma Alpha Epsilon (1910, 2024)
- Sigma Alpha Mu (1913, 2021)
- Sigma Chi (1904)
- Tau Kappa Epsilon (1963, 2023)
- Theta Chi (1928)
- Zeta Beta Tau (1911)

== Professional Fraternity Association ==
The Professional Fraternity Association at Syracuse includes the following fraternities and sororities:

- Alpha Chi Sigma, coeducational chemical sciences fraternity
- Alpha Kappa Psi, coeducational business fraternity
- Alpha Omega Epsilon, engineering and technical sciences sorority
- Alpha Phi Omega, coeducational service fraternity
- Delta Kappa Alpha, gender-inclusive professional cinematic society
- Delta Sigma Pi, coeducational professional business fraternity
- Kappa Kappa Psi, coeducational honor fraternity for school bands
- Phi Alpha Delta, coeducational professional law fraternity
- Phi Mu Alpha Sinfonia, social fraternity for men with a special interest in music (former PFA member)
- Phi Sigma Pi, gender-inclusive national honor fraternity
- Sigma Alpha Iota, women's music fraternity
- Tau Beta Sigma, coeducational honorary band society
- Theta Tau (1925–2018), coeducation professional engineering fraternity, permanently expelled
