= Lambdas =

Lambdas may refer to:

- Lambda Alpha Upsilon, an American Latino-interest fraternity
- Lambda Phi Epsilon, an American Asian-interest fraternity
- Lambda Theta Nu, an American Latina sorority
- Lambda Theta Phi, an American Latin-interest fraternity
- Lambda Upsilon Lambda, an American Latino-interest fraternity

== See also ==
- Lambda (disambiguation)
