= List of Vanderbilt University fraternities and sororities =

The following is a list of Vanderbilt University fraternities and sororities.

== Intercultural Greek Council ==
- Alpha Psi Lambda (coed fraternity)

== Interfraternity Council ==
The following fraternities at Vanderbilt are members of the North American Interfraternity Conference.

- Alpha Epsilon Pi
- Alpha Tau Omega
- Beta Theta Pi
- Beta Upsilon Chi
- Kappa Alpha Order
- Kappa Sigma
- Lambda Chi Alpha
- Phi Delta Theta
- Phi Gamma Delta (inactive)
- Phi Kappa Psi
- Pi Kappa Alpha
- Sigma Alpha Epsilon
- Sigma Chi (inactive)
- Sigma Nu
- Zeta Beta Tau

== National Pan-Hellenic Council ==
The following historically African American fraternities and sororities at Vanderbilt are members of the National Pan-Hellenic Council.

- Alpha Kappa Alpha (sorority)
- Alpha Phi Alpha (fraternity)
- Delta Sigma Theta (sorority)
- Kappa Alpha Psi (fraternity)
- Omega Psi Phi (fraternity)
- Phi Beta Sigma (fraternity)
- Sigma Gamma Rho (sorority)
- Zeta Phi Beta (sorority)

== Panhellenic Council ==
The following sororities and women's fraternities at Vanderbilt are members of the National Panhellenic Conference.

- Alpha Chi Omega (inactive)
- Alpha Delta Pi
- Chi Omega
- Delta Delta Delta
- Kappa Alpha Theta
- Kappa Delta
- Kappa Kappa Gamma
- Pi Beta Phi
- Zeta Tau Alpha

== Honor societies ==
The following honor societes have a chapter at Vanderbilt.

- Alpha Lambda Delta
- Athenians (local)
- Lotus Eaters (local)
- Mortar Board
- Omicron Delta Kappa
- Order of Omega
- Phi Eta Sigma
