= Kappa Sigma Fraternity House (Champaign, Illinois) =

- U.S. National Register of Historic Places
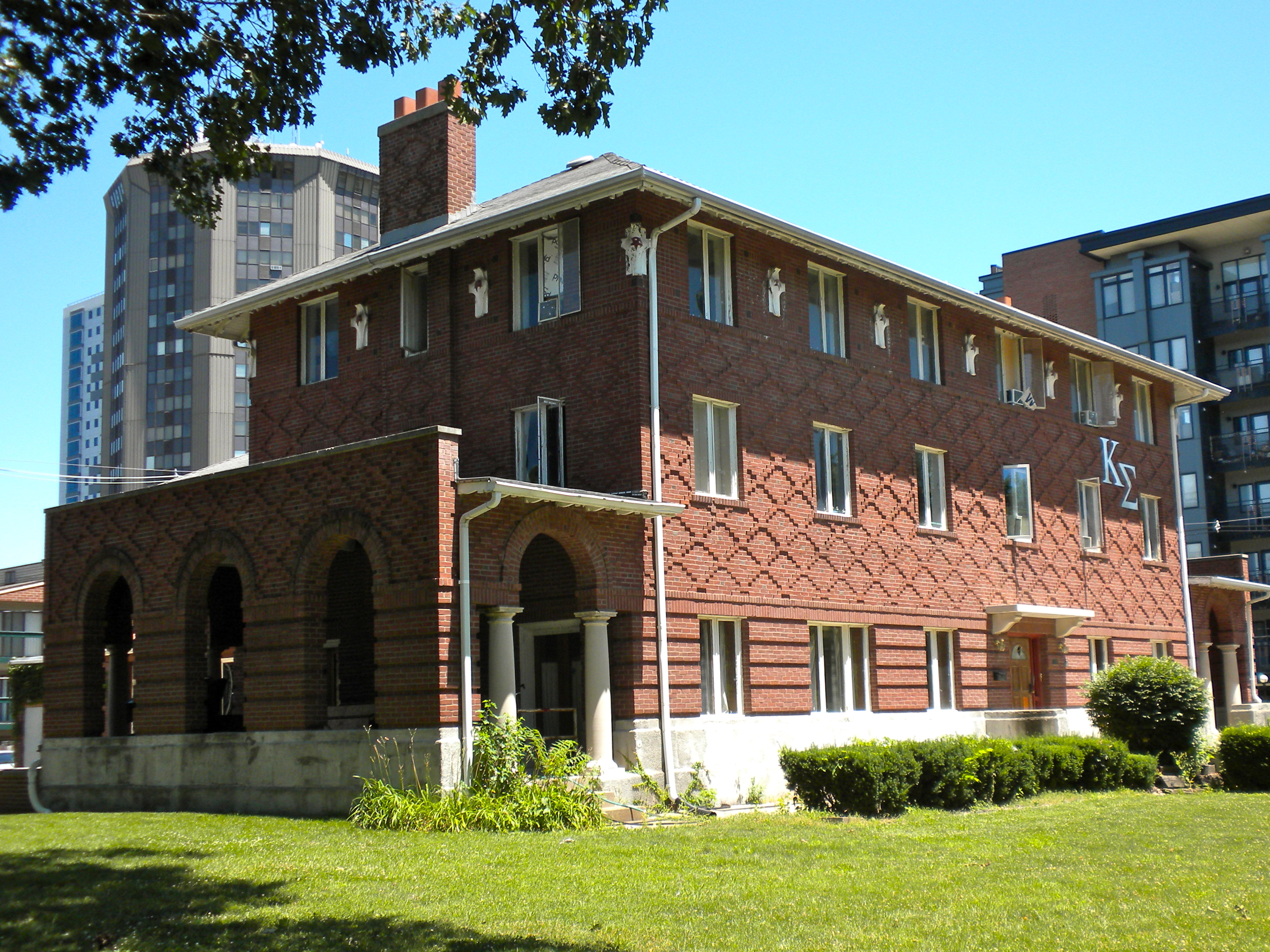

- Location within Illinois Location within the United States
- Location: 212 E. Daniel St., Champaign, Illinois
- Coordinates: 40°6′29″N 88°14′12″W
- Area: less than one acre
- Built: 1911
- Built by: Stoolman, Almon W.
- Architect: Hubbard, Archie H.
- Architectural style: Italian Renaissance
- MPS: Fraternity and Sorority Houses at the Urbana--Champaign Campus of the University of Illinois MPS
- NRHP reference No.: 89001109
- Added to NRHP: August 28, 1989

The Kappa Sigma Fraternity House is a historic fraternity house at the University of Illinois Urbana–Champaign in Champaign, Illinois. The house was built in 1911 for the Alpha Gamma chapter of Kappa Sigma fraternity. It was added to the National Register of Historic Places on August 28, 1989

== History ==
The Alpha Gamma chapter of Kappa Sigma fraternity was established at the University of Illinois Urbana–Champaignin on December 12, 1891. it was the first fraternity chartered at the university after it lifted its prohibition on fraternities. The university's first football coach, Robert Lackey, helped found the chapter, and during its early years many of the university's best athletes were members.

The fraternity built its chapter house at 212 East Daniel Street in Champaign in 1911. It was one of the university's first large fraternity houses. The building was added to the National Register of Historic Places on August 28, 1989.

== Architecture ==
Architect Archie H. Hubbard, a member of the fraternity, designed the house in the Italian Renaissance Revival style. It was built by A. W. Stoolman, a local contractor. The three-story brick building features a loggia or covered gallery on its two side facades and belt courses dividing the floors. The upper two stories of the building have distinctive diamond-patterned brickwork.

== See also ==
- North American fraternity and sorority housing
- List of social fraternities and sororities at UIUC
