= List of Chi Upsilon Sigma chapters =

Chi Upsilon Sigma is a Latin-based Greek letter intercollegiate sorority. Following is a list of Chi Upsilon Sigma chapters.

== Undergraduate chapters ==
The following list includes undergraduate chapters. Active chapters are indicated in bold. Inactive chapters are in italics.

Chapter	Charter date and range	Institution	Location	Status	Ref.
**Alpha**	April 29, 1980	Rutgers University–New Brunswick	New Brunswick, New Jersey	Active	
**Beta**	1983	Rutgers University–Newark	Newark, New Jersey	Active	
**Gamma**	1983	Seton Hall University	South Orange, New Jersey	Active	
**Delta**	1990	The College of New Jersey	Ewing Township, New Jersey	Active	
**Epsilon**	1991	Rutgers University–Camden	Camden, New Jersey	Active	
**Zeta**	1992	Saint Peter's University and New Jersey City University	Jersey City, New Jersey	Active	
**Eta**	1993	Temple University	Philadelphia, Pennsylvania	Active	
**Theta**	1993	Kutztown University of Pennsylvania and Albright College	Kutztown and Reading, Pennsylvania	Active	
Iota	1994 – xxxx ?	Bloomsburg University of Pennsylvania	Bloomsburg, Pennsylvania	Inactive	
**Kappa**	1995	Montclair State University	Montclair, New Jersey	Active	
**Lambda**	1995 ?	Rowan University	Glassboro, New Jersey	Active	
**Mu**	1996	Philadelphia Metropolitan	Philadelphia, Pennsylvania	Active	
**Nu**	1997	Kean University	Union County, New Jersey	Active	
**Xi**	1997	University of Delaware	Newark, Delaware	Active	
**Omicron**	1997	Drexel University	Philadelphia, Pennsylvania	Active	
**Pi**	1998	University of North Texas	Denton, Texas	Active	
**Rho**	1998	Fairleigh Dickinson University	Madison and Florham Park, New Jersey	Active	
**Sigma Emerging**	1998	LIU Post	Brookville, New York	Colony	
**Tau Emerging**	1999	Central Connecticut State University	New Britain, Connecticut	Colony	
**Upsilon**	1999	LeMoyne College and Syracuse University	Syracuse, New York	Active	
**Phi**	2000	Texas A&M University	College Station, Texas	Active	
**Chi**	2000	Pennsylvania State University	University Park, Pennsylvania	Active	
**Psi Emerging**	2001	University of South Carolina	Columbia, South Carolina	Colony	
**Omega**		reserved for honorary sisters		Active	
**Alpha Alpha**	2001	West Chester University	West Chester, Pennsylvania	Active	
**Alpha Beta**	2003	Rider University	Lawrence Township, New Jersey	Active	
**Alpha Gamma**	2003	Rollins College	Winter Park, Florida	Active	
**Alpha Delta Emerging**	2002 ?	Cornell University	Ithaca, New York	Colony	
**Alpha Epsilon Emerging**	2002	Penn State Abington	Abington Township, Pennsylvania	Colony	
**Alpha Zeta**	2003	Texas Christian University	Fort Worth, Texas	Active	
**Alpha Eta**	2003 ?	Texas Woman's University	Denton, Texas	Active	
**Alpha Theta Emerging**	2004 ?	Utica College	Utica, New York	Colony	
**Alpha Iota**	2004	University of Rhode Island	Kingston, Rhode Island	Active	
**Alpha Kappa Emerging**	2005 ?	Stevens Institute of Technology	Hoboken, New Jersey	Colony	
**Alpha Lambda**	2004	University of North Carolina at Charlotte	Charlotte, North Carolina	Active	
**Alpha Mu**	2004	University of South Florida	Tampa, Florida	Active	
**Alpha Nu Emerging**	2006 ?	New York City Metropolitan	New York, New York	Colony	
**Alpha Xi**	2006	University of Central Florida	Orlando, Florida	Active	
**Alpha Omicron Emerging**	2006 ?	Washington D.C./North Virginia Metropolitan	Washington, D.C., and Northern Virginia	Colony	
**Alpha Pi**	2006	State University of New York at New Paltz	New Paltz, New York	Active	
**Alpha Rho**	2006	University of Bridgeport	Bridgeport, Connecticut	Active	
**Alpha Sigma**	2005	Radford University	Radford, Virginia	Active	
**Alpha Tau Emerging**	2006	Texas State University	San Marcos, Texas	Colony	
**Alpha Upsilon Emerging**	2007 ?	New Mexico State University	Las Cruces, New Mexico	Colony	
**Alpha Phi Emerging**	2008 ?	Boston University	Boston, Massachusetts	Colony	
**Alpha Chi**	2008	University of Arizona	Tucson, Arizona	Active	
**Alpha Psi**	2008	State University of New York at Oneonta	Oneonta, New York	Active	
Alpha Omega		Reserved		Memorial	
**Beta Alpha**	2009	University of Texas at Austin	Austin, Texas	Active	
**Beta Beta**	2009	University of North Carolina at Greensboro	Greensboro, North Carolina	Active	
Beta Gamma	2010	Johnson & Wales University	North Miami, Florida	Inactive	
**Beta Delta**	2009	George Mason University	Fairfax, Virginia	Active	
**Beta Epsilon**	2009	University of Houston	Houston, Texas	Active	
**Beta Zeta**	2010	William Paterson University	Wayne, New Jersey	Active	
**Beta Eta**	2010	University of Michigan	Ann Arbor, Michigan	Active	
**Beta Theta**	2011	Shippensburg University and Elizabethtown College	Shippensburg and Elizabethtown, Pennsylvania	Active	
**Beta Iota**	2011	Binghamton University	Binghamton, New York	Active	
**Beta Kappa Emerging**	2011	Fairleigh Dickinson University	Teaneck, New Jersey	Colony	
**Beta Lambda Emerging**	2012	Bloomfield College	Bloomfield, New Jersey	Colony	
**Beta Mu**	2012	University of Maryland, College Park	College Park, Maryland	Active	
**Beta Nu**	2012	Millersville University of Pennsylvania	Millersville, Pennsylvania	Active	
**Beta Xi**	2012	State University of New York Albany	Albany, New York	Active	
**Beta Omicron Emerging**	2013	Pennsylvania State University	Harrisburg, Pennsylvania	Colony	
**Beta Pi Emerging**	2013	East Stroudsburg University of Pennsylvania	East Stroudsburg, Pennsylvania	Colony	
**Beta Rho**	2013	Quinnipiac University	Hamden, Connecticut	Active	
**Beta Sigma Emerging**	November 10, 2013	Rochester Institute of Technology	Rochester, New York	Colony	
**Beta Tau**	2014	Ramapo College of New Jersey	Mahwah, New Jersey	Active	
**Beta Upsilon Emerging**	2014	University of Wisconsin–Madison	Madison, Wisconsin	Colony	
**Beta Phi**	2014	Indiana University of Pennsylvania	Indiana, Pennsylvania	Active	
**Beta Chi**	2015	Appalachian State University	Boone, North Carolina	Active	
**Beta Psi**	2015	Elon University	Elon, North Carolina	Active	
**Beta Omega**	2015	Charlotte City-Wide	Charlotte, North Carolina	Active	
**Gamma Alpha**	2015	Stockton University	Galloway Township, New Jersey	Active	
**Gamma Beta**	2017	Monmouth University	West Long Branch, New Jersey	Active	
**Gamma Gamma**	2017	University of Massachusetts Dartmouth	Dartmouth, Massachusetts	Active	
**Gamma Delta**	2018	University of New Haven	West Haven, Connecticut	Active	
**Gamma Epsilon**	April 13, 2021	University of South Carolina Upstate	Spartanburg, South Carolina	Active	
**Gamma Zeta**	November 13, 2021	Metropolitan State University of Denver	Denver, Colorado	Active	
**Gamma Eta Emerging**	2021	York College of Pennsylvania	York, Pennsylvania	Colony	
**Gamma Theta Emerging**	2024	Gettysburg College	Gettysburg, Pennsylvania	Active	
**Gamma Iota**	2024	Wake Forest University	Winston-Salem, North Carolina	Active	
**Gamma Kappa**	2025	Texas A&M International University	Laredo, Texas	Active	

== Graduate chapters ==
The following list includes graduate chapters. Active chapters are indicated in bold. Inactive chapters are in italics.

Chapter	Service area	Location	Status	Ref.
Omega Alpha	Philadelphia Metropolitan Area	Philadelphia, Pennsylvania	Active	
Omega Beta	Dallas/Fort Worth Metropolitan Area	Dallas, Texas	Active	
Omega Gamma	North/Central New Jersey Area	New Jersey	Active	
Omega Delta	New York City Metropolitan Area	New York City, New York	Active	
Omega Epsilon	Greater Washington, D.C., Metropolitan Area	Maryland, District of Columbia, and Virginia	Active	
Omega Zeta	Houston Metropolitan Area	Houston, Texas	Active	
Omega Eta	Orlando Area	Orlando, Florida	Active	
Omega Theta	Lehigh Valley Area	Reading, Pennsylvania	Active	
Omega Iota	Charlotte Metropolitan Area	Charlotte, North Carolina	Active	
Omega Kappa	Southern New England	Connecticut, Rhode Island, and Massachusetts	Active	
Omega Lambda	Tampa Area- Florida	Tampa, Florida	Active	
Omega Mu	South New Jersey Area	New Jersey	Active	
Omega Nu	Northern and Southern California	California	Active	
Omega Xi	Central Pennsylvania	Pennsylvania	Active	
Omega Omicron	South Florida	Florida	Active	
Omega Pi	Greater Midwest Area		Active	
