= List of Alpha Psi Lambda chapters =

Alpha Psi Lambda is an American co-educational, Latino-oriented fraternity. The fraternity was established in 1985 at Ohio State University in Columbus, Ohio. It was the first co-ed fraternity for Latino college students in the United States.

In the following list of Alpha Psi Lambda chapters, active chapters and affiliate chapters (colonies) are indicated in bold and inactive chapters are indicated in italics.

Chapter	Charter date and range	Institution	Location	Status	Ref.
**Alpha**	February 11, 1985	Ohio State University	Columbus, Ohio	Active	
**Beta**	May 8, 1988	University of Illinois Urbana-Champaign	Champaign, Illinois	Active	
**Gamma**	1989	Northern Illinois University	DeKalb, Illinois	Active	
Delta	1991–20xx ?	Southern Methodist University	Dallas, Texas	Inactive	
**Epsilon**	1991	Purdue University Northwest	Hammond, Indiana	Active	
Zeta	1993–202x ?	University of Illinois Chicago	Chicago, Illinois	Inactive	
**Eta**	1996	Ohio University	Athens, Ohio	Active	
**Theta**	1996–20xx ?; 20xx ?	University of Cincinnati	Cincinnati, Ohio	Active	
**Iota**	September 8, 1996	DePaul University	Chicago, Illinois	Active	
Kappa	1997–20xx ?	Kent State University	Kent, Ohio	Inactive	
**Lambda**	1998	Illinois State University	Normal, Illinois	Active	
Mu	1999–2020	University of Houston	Houston, Texas	Inactive	
**Nu**	2001	University of Toledo	Toledo, Ohio	Active	
**Xi**	2001	Loyola University Chicago	Chicago, Illinois	Active	
**Omicron**	2003	Texas A&M International University	Laredo, Texas	Active	
Pi	2003–20xx ?	Texas State University	San Marcos, Texas	Inactive	
Rho	May 12, 2005 – 202x ?	Northeastern Illinois University	Chicago, Illinois	Inactive	
Sigma	2005–20xx ?	University of Texas at Austin	Austin, Texas	Inactive	
Tau	2006–20xx ?	Texas Tech University	Lubbock, Texas	Inactive	
Upsilon	2006–202x ?	Florida Atlantic University	Boca Raton, Florida	Inactive	
Phi	2009–20xx ?	Prairie View A&M University	Prairie View, Texas	Inactive	
**Chi**	2012	Lewis University	Romeoville, Illinois	Active	
**Psi**	2013	Northern Kentucky University	Highland Heights, Kentucky	Active	
**Omega**				Memorial	
Alpha Alpha	2013–20xx ?	Coastal Carolina University	Conway, South Carolina	Inactive	
Alpha Beta	2013–20xx ?	University of Texas Rio Grande Valley	Brownsville, Texas and Edinburg, Texas	Inactive	
**Alpha Gamma**	2014	California State University, Sacramento	Sacramento, California	Active	
**Alpha Delta**	2014	Southern Illinois University Edwardsville	Edwardsville, Illinois	Active	
**Alpha Epsilon**	2015	University of Michigan–Dearborn	Dearborn, Michigan	Active	
**Alpha Zeta**	November 15, 2015	Colorado State University Pueblo	Pueblo, Colorado	Active	
**Alpha Eta**	2016	Eastern Illinois University	Charleston, Illinois	Active	
**Alpha Theta**	2016	University of North Carolina Wilmington	Wilmington, North Carolina	Active	
**Alpha Iota**	2016	Western Illinois University	Macomb, Illinois	Inactive	
**Alpha Kappa**	2017	University of St. Francis	Joliet, Illinois	Active	
Alpha Lambda	2018–202x ?	Washington State University	Pullman, Washington	Inactive	
**Alpha Mu**	2018	Washington University in St. Louis	St. Louis, Missouri	Active	
**Alpha Nu**	2018	University of Dayton	Dayton, Ohio	Active	
**Alpha Xi**	2017	University of Lynchburg	Lynchburg, Virginia	Active	
Alpha Omicron	2018–202x ?	Lindenwood University	St. Charles, Missouri	Inactive	
**Alpha Pi**	2019	Bradley University	Peoria, Illinois	Active	
**Alpha Rho**	2020	California State University, Fullerton	Fullerton, California	Active	
**Alpha Sigma**	2021	Miami University	Oxford, Ohio	Active	
**Alpha Tau**	2021	Nicholls State University	Thibodaux, Louisiana	Active	
**Alpha Upsilon**	2022	Vanderbilt University	Nashville, Tennessee	Active	
**Alpha Phi**	2023	University of Wisconsin–Madison	Madison, Wisconsin	Active	
**Alpha Chi**	2023	Illinois Institute of Technology	Chicago, Illinois	Active	
**Alpha Psi**	2022	University of Houston–Downtown	Houston, Texas	Active	
**Alpha Omega**	2024	Northwestern University	Evanston, Illinois	Active	
**Beta Alpha**	2024	Georgia Southwestern State University	Americus, Georgia	Active	
**Beta Beta**	2024	University of Richmond	Richmond, Virginia	Active	
**Denison University Affiliate**		Denison University	Granville, Ohio	Active	(Note: Affiliate chapter was established in 2024.)
**Florida International Affiliate**		Florida International University	Westchester, Florida	Active	(Note: Affiliate chapter formed in the fall of 2025.)
**Governors State University Affiliate**		Governors State University	University Park, Illinois	Active	
**Jax State Affiliate**		Jacksonville State University	Jacksonville, Alabama	Active	
**Tennessee Tech Affiliate**		Tennessee Technological University	Cookeville, Tennessee	Active	(Note: Affiliate chapter formed in 2023.)
**Wingate University Affiliate**		Wingate University	Wingate, North Carolina	Active	

== Alumni clubs ==
Following are the alumni clubs are Alpha Psi Lambda, with active clubs indicated in bold and inactive clubs indicated in italics.

Club	Charter date	Chapter affiliation	Location	Status	Ref.
**Rho Alumni Club**	2015	Rho	Chicago, Illinois	Active	
**Iota Alumni Club**	2018	Iota	Chicago, Illinois	Active	
Alpha Epsilon Alumni Club		Alpha Epsilon	Dearborn, Michigan	Inactive	
Lambda Alumni Club	2020	Lambda	Normal, Illinois	Inactive	
Texas Alumni Club	2021	Delta, Mu, Omicron, Pi, Sigma, Tau, Phi, and Alpha Beta	Texas	Inactive	
Upsilon Alumni Club	2021	Upsilon	Boca Raton, Florida	Inactive	
Alpha Kappa Alumni Club	2022	Alpha Kappa	Joliet, Illinois	Inactive	
