= Delta Sigma =

Delta Sigma may refer to:

- Delta Sigma fraternity, a secondary school fraternity founded in 1897 at Lewis Institute in Chicago, Illinois
- Delta Sigma (sorority), a defunct collegiate sorority, absorbed by Alpha Omicron Pi
- Delta-sigma modulation, a pulse density modulation scheme used in analog-to-digital and digital-to-analog conversions
