= Alpha Pi Sigma =

American Latina-based sorority

- ΑΠΣ
- Founded: March 10, 1990; 36 years ago San Diego State University
- Type: Social
- Affiliation: NALFO
- Status: Active
- Emphasis: Multicultural - Latina
- Scope: National
- Motto: Amigas Para Siempre
- Colors: Baby Pink and Royal Purple
- Symbol: Infinity
- Flower: White Calla Lily
- Chapters: 18
- Nickname: Alphas,
- Headquarters: , California 91333; United States
- Website: www.alphapisigma.org

Alpha Pi Sigma Sorority Incorporated (ΑΠΣ) is a multicultural Latina-based sorority founded in 1990 at San Diego State University. It was created to bring together and support the Latina women but is open to non-Latinas. The sorority has nineteen chapters in six states.

== History ==
Thirteen Latina women established Alpha Pi Sigma on March 10, 1990, at San Diego State University. They saw the need to unite and support Latina women on university campuses.

The sorority's founders established six purposes that define the organization. The chapters carry out these purposes, including academic excellence, leadership development, cultural awareness, unity and friendship, empowerment, and community service. However, academic excellence is the sorority's primary value, along with community service.

The sorority is a member of the National Association of Latino Fraternal Organizations (NALFO) and holds a strict anti-hazing policy.

== Symbols ==
The sorority's motto is Amigas Para Siempre. Its colors are baby pink and royal purple. Its symbol is the infinity sign. Its flower is the white calla lily.

== Philanthropy ==
Both active sisters and alumnae are encouraged to raise funds to support the sorority's national philanthropy. Chapters also select their philanthropies and volunteer in the Latino community. Some examples of the Alpha Pi Sigma efforts are American Cancer Society, autism awareness, lunch distribution, heart disease awareness, a Tijuana-based orphanage, and Relay for Life.

== Chapters ==
There are seventeen active chapters of Alpha Pi Sigma in the United States, most in California. Active chapters are indicated in bold. Inactive chapters are indicated in italic.

| Chapter | Charter date and range | Institution | Location | Ref. |
|---|---|---|---|---|
| Alpha | March 10, 1990 | San Diego State University | San Diego, California | |
| Beta | March 1, 1996 | California State Polytechnic University, Pomona | Pomona, California | |
| Gamma | March 4, 2000–20xx | California Polytechnic University San Luis Obispo | San Luis Obispo, California | |
| Delta | March 5, 2000 | University of California, Riverside | Riverside, California | |
| Epsilon | August 5, 2001 | California State University San Marcos | San Marcos, California | |
| Zeta | August 26, 2006 | California State University, Fresno | Fresno, California | |
| Eta | March 29, 2008 | California State University, Northridge | Northridge, Los Angeles, California | |
| Theta | October 11, 2009 | San Francisco State University | San Francisco, California | |
| Iota | July 9, 2010 | University of California, Davis | Davis, California | |
| Kappa | August 7, 2010 | Santa Clara University | Santa Clara, California | |
| Lambda | August 20, 2010 | University of California, Santa Barbara | Santa Barbara, California | |
| Mu | April 30, 2011 | California State University, Stanislaus | Turlock, California | |
| Nu | April 30, 2011 | Boise State University | Boise, Idaho | |
| Xi | March 23, 2012 | University of Illinois Urbana-Champaign | Urbana, Illinois | |
| Omicron | April 11, 2013 | California State University, Sacramento | Sacramento, California | |
| Pi | April 20, 2013 | Eastern Washington University | Cheney, Washington | |
| Rho | December 18, 2014 | University of San Diego | San Diego, California | |
| Sigma | December 8, 2018 | University of Nevada, Reno | Reno, Nevada | |
| Tau | March 16, 2025 | Ball State University | Muncie, Indiana | |
