= Delta Sigma (sorority) =

American college women's fraternity

- ΔΣ
- Founded: May 1895; 130 years ago Tufts University
- Type: Social
- Affiliation: Independent
- Status: Merged
- Merge date: April 13, 1908
- Successor: Alpha Omicron Pi
- Emphasis: Literary
- Scope: Regional
- Colors: Pale green and White
- Flower: Violet
- Chapters: 3
- Members: 200 lifetime
- Headquarters: United States

Delta Sigma (ΔΣ) was a small collegiate women's fraternity operating in New England from 1895 to 1908.

== History ==
=== Predecessors ===
Delta Sigma was formed from three local women's fraternities or sororities.

The oldest was Alpha Delta Sigma. In May 1895, six female students at Tufts University drew up plans for a women's fraternity they named Alpha Delta Sigma. Its founders were Mary G. Fickett, Georgia L. Hodgdon, Frances G. Gefford, Martha L. Root, Carrie L. Worthen, and Kate E. Cousens. In October 1895, the fraternity's members drafted its constitution and bylaws. Its first initiations were held on November 14 and December 9, 1895. The Alpha Delta Sigma badge was a "square pin of blue enamel displaying the letters". Its colors were blue and gold.

Female students at Brown University, approximately 45 miles from Tufts, created the women's fraternity Delta Sigma (local) in 1896.

Phi Gamma was a women's society established at the University of Maine in February 1897 and was the first sorority on campus. Its original members were Agnes Burnham, Autense Cousens, Susie Davis, Rena Dunn, Maude Farnham, Lottie Farrar, Grace Fernandez, Carrie Green, Emily Hamlin, Rena Morrisette. Mildred Powell, and Pearl Swain. Phi Gamma's colors were yellow and white; its flower was the Jacqueminot rose.

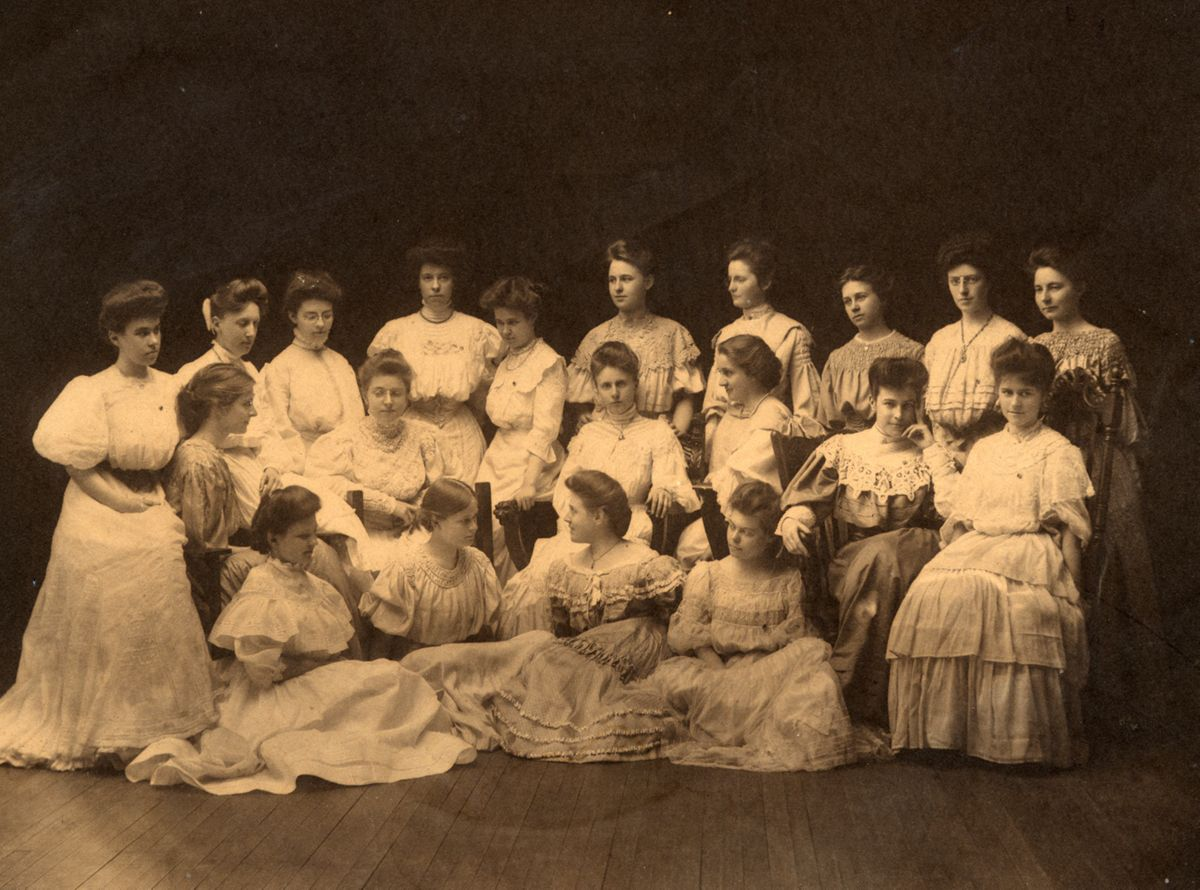
Beta chapter at Brown University, 1905

=== Delta Sigma ===
On November 2, 1901, Alpha Delta Sigma and Delta Sigma (local) merged into a regional literary fraternity called Delta Sigma. Alpha Delta Sigma from Tufts became the Alpha chapter and Delta Sigma (local) became the Beta chapter. The new fraternity used Alpha Delta Sigma for its establishment date and location. Phi Gamma joined Delta Sigma as its Gamma chapter in 1903. By 1907, Delta Sigma had 200 initiates and three college chapters and eight alumnae associations.

On April 13, 1908, Delta Sigma was absorbed by Alpha Omicron Pi. Alpha Omicron Pi was a young organization but was quickly growing, having formed eight chapters in the preceding decade. Alpha Omicron Pi was established at Barnard College in 1897, so the three incoming Delta Sigma chapters were all slightly older than the new sorority's chapters. With this merger, Delta Sigma ceased to exist as a regional fraternity. In its lifetime, it had around 200 members.

The Tufts chapter became the Alpha Omicron Pi Delta chapter which was active until 2017. The University of Maine chapter retained its Gamma name and is still active as of 2023. The Brown chapter also retained its name as the Beta chapter but withdrew from Alpha Omicron Pi within a year, again becoming a local fraternity.

=== Secret Order of Delta Sigma ===
The restored Delta Sigma (local) at Brown University was called The Secret Order of Delta Sigma. It used the original local fraternity's 1896 founding date and was incorporated in 1908. It was active until 1911 when Brown, including Pembroke, banned Greek letter organizations.

== Symbols ==
The regional sorority Delta Sigma adopted the colors and symbols of its predecessor Delta Sigma (local). Its colors were Nile or pale green and white. Its flower was the violet. Its badge was "a square of black enamel with concave sides outlined in gold, and displaying the letters "ΔΣ" in gold; this square is encircled by a jeweled golden circle".

== Chapters ==
Chapters	Charter date and range	Institution	Location	Status	Ref.
Alpha	May 1895–1908	Tufts University	Medford, Massachusetts	Merged (ΑΟΠ)	(Note: This chapter started as Alpha Delta Sigma (local). It merged with Delta Sigma (local) as Delta Sigma on November 2, 1901. The entire sorority merged into ΑΟΠ in 1908 and this became its Delta chapter)
Beta	1896–1908	Brown University	Providence, Rhode Island	Merged (ΑΟΠ)	(Note: This chapter started as Delta Sigma (local). It merged with Alpha Delta Sigma (local) to form the regional Delta Sigma on November 2, 1901. The entire sorority merged into ΑΟΠ in 1908 and this became its Beta chapter. That same year, the chapter incorporated as the Delta Sigma Secret Society, re-establishing itself as a local women's fraternity. It went dormant when Brown banned Greek letter organizations.)
Gamma	1903–1908	University of Maine	Orono, Maine	Merged (ΑΟΠ)	(Note: This chapter was formed as Phi Gamma (local), established in 1897. In 1908, it became the Gamma chapter of ΑΟΠ when the two fraternities merged.)
