= Gamma Phi Omega =

Latina American collegiate sorority

- ΓΦΏ
- Coat of Arms of Gamma Phi Omega
- Founded: April 17, 1991; 35 years ago Indiana University Bloomington
- Type: Social
- Affiliation: NALFO
- Status: Active
- Emphasis: Latina
- Scope: Regional
- Motto: "Unity and Sisterhood, Now and Forever, One and Inseparable"
- Pillars: Academic Excellence, Community Service, Cultural Awareness, Sisterhood
- Colors: Maroon and Navy
- Flower: Fire and Ice roses
- Jewel: Star sapphire
- Mascot: Swan
- Philanthropy: American Diabetes Association
- Chapters: 27
- Nickname: GPhiO
- Headquarters: 1945 South Halsted; Chicago, Illinois 60608; United States
- Website: gammaphiomega.org

Gamma Phi Omega (ΓΦΏ)is an American collegiate sorority for Latina students. It was established at Indiana University Bloomington in 1991. It is a member of the National Association of Latino Fraternal Organizations.

== History ==
Gamma Phi Omega was established at Indiana University Bloomington on April 17, 1991. It was created as a sorority where Latina women could connect through their shared experiences and cultural values. It was founded by Veronica Montemayor who recruit founding members Margaret Escabalzeta, Laura Garcia, Barbara Graves, Monica Guzman, and Cristina Rodela.

Its second chapter, Beta, was chartered at the University of Illinois Chicago in 1993. This was followed by Gamma at DePauw University and Delta at Ball State University in 1994. Other chapters followed, primarily in the Midwestern United States.

Gamma Phi Omega's headquarters is at 1945 South Halsted in Chicago, Illinois. It is a member of the National Association of Latino Fraternal Organizations.

== Symbols ==
Gamma Phi Omega's mottos is "Unity and Sisterhood, Now and Forever, One and Inseparable". Its goals or pillars are Academic Excellence, Community Service, Cultural Awareness, and Sisterhood.

Gamma Phi Omega's colors are maroon and navy. Its mascot is the swan. Its flowers are the Fire and Ice roses. Its jewel is the star sapphire. The sorority's nickname is GPhiO.

== Activities ==
The sorority participates in events that celebrate Latino heritage. Members also volunteer, mentor, and raise funds to help their community and the sororities national philanthropy. Its national philanthropy is the American Diabetes Association.

== Membership ==
Gamma Phi Omega accepts members of all ethnicities.

== Chapters ==
Following is a list of Gamma Phi Omega collegiate chapters, with active chapters indicated in bold and inactive chapters in italics.

Chapter	Charter date and range	Institution	Location	Status	Ref.
**Alpha**	April 17, 1991	Indiana University Bloomington	Bloomington, Indiana	Active	
**Beta**	April 24, 1993	University of Illinois Chicago	Chicago, Illinois	Active	
**Gamma**	July 29, 1994	DePauw University	Greencastle, Indiana	Active	
**Delta**	September 10, 1994	Ball State University	Muncie, Indiana	Active	
**Epsilon**	March 30, 1996	DePaul University	Chicago, Illinois	Active	
**Zeta**	June 30, 1996	Loyola University Chicago	Chicago, Illinois	Active	
**Eta**	March 27, 1999	Aurora University	Aurora, Illinois	Active	
**Theta**	June 3, 2000	Northern Illinois University	DeKalb, Illinois	Active	
**Iota**	August 23, 2003	Columbia College Chicago, Dominican University, Illinois Institute of Technology, Robert Morris University Illinois, Roosevelt University	Chicago, Illinois	Active	
**Kappa**	December 19, 2004	Lewis University	Romeoville, Illinois	Active	
**Lambda**	December 19, 2004	University of Illinois at Urbana-Champaign	Urbana, Illinois	Active	
**Mu**	June 17, 2006	Southern Illinois University Edwardsville	Edwardsville, Illinois	Active	
**Nu**	December 2, 2006	Northeastern Illinois University	Chicago, Illinois	Active	
**Xi**	April 11, 2008	Indiana University–Purdue University Indianapolis	Indianapolis, Indiana	Active	
**Omicron**	March 24, 2012	Purdue University Northwest	Hammond, Indiana	Active	
**Pi**	March 31, 2012	University of North Texas	Denton, Texas	Active	
**Rho**	April 28, 2012	Lake Forest College	Lake Forest, Illinois	Active	
**Sigma**	June 22, 2013	Illinois State University	Normal, Illinois	Active	
**Tau**	June 23, 2013	Southern Illinois University Carbondale	Carbondale, Illinois	Active	
**Upsilon**	April 26, 2014	Texas A&M University	College Station, Texas	Active	
**Phi**	March 21, 2015	Western Illinois University	Macomb, Illinois	Active	
**Chi**	December 6, 2015	University of Illinois Springfield	Springfield, Illinois	Active	
**Psi**	April 13, 2019	University of Southern Indiana	Evansville, Indiana	Active	
Omega				Unassigned	
Alpha Alpha	November 23, 2019	Washburn University	Topeka, Kansas	Inactive	
**Alpha Beta**	February 9, 2020	Central Michigan University	Mount Pleasant, Michigan	Active	
**Alpha Gamma**	March 1, 2020	Indiana State University	Terre Haute, Indiana	Active	
**Alpha Delta**	August 4, 2020	University of Dayton	Dayton, Ohio	Active	

== See also ==
- Cultural interest fraternities and sororities
- List of Latino fraternities and sororities
- List of social sororiies and women's fraternities
