= Omega Phi Beta =

American Latino collegiate sorority

- ΩΦΒ
- Founded: March 15, 1989; 37 years ago University at Albany, SUNY
- Type: Social
- Affiliation: NALFO
- Status: Active
- Emphasis: Latina
- Scope: National
- Motto: Sirviendo y Educando a Través de Nuestra Diversidad "Serving and Educating Through Our Diversity"
- Pillars: Sisterhood, Diversity, Leadership, Service, Academic Excellence
- Colors: Black, Forest Green, and Radiant Gold
- Flower: Sunflower
- Mascot: Hummingbird
- Philanthropy: Violence against women
- Chapters: 51 collegiate; 15 alumnae
- Colonies: 1 collegiate, 4 alumnae
- Nickname: OPB, Betas, Radiant Sisters
- Headquarters: Radio City Station; PO Box 2104; New York City, New York 10101-2104; United States
- Website: www.omegaphibeta.org

Omega Phi Beta (ΩΦΒ) is a Latina-oriented collegiate sorority founded in 1989 at the State University of New York in Albany, New York. It is a member organization of National Association of Latino Fraternal Organizations.

== History ==
Omega Phi Beta sorority was founded on March 15, 1989, at the State University of New York in Albany, New York Its founders were seventeen women of diverse cultural and ethnic backgrounds, including:

- Saida Abrego (Salvadoran)
- Ileana Adorno (Puerto Rican)
- Ana E. Almonte (Dominican)
- T. Lisa Auson (Chinese/Dominican)
- Bevene B. Bablington (Jamaican)
- Brunilda Y. Cruz (Puerto Rican)
- Sara Delgado (Ecuadorian and Puerto Rican)
- Nancy J. Diaz (Dominican)
- Frances Echevarria (Puerto Rican)
- Annette A. Ettrick (Panamanian)
- Lissette Jorge (Dominican)
- Samantha P. Lopez (Uruguayan)
- Renee Padilla (Puerto Rican)
- Grace Rivera (Puerto Rican)
- Sylvia Toledo (Ecuadorian)
- Michelle Vasquez (Puerto Rican)
- Jane M. Vega (Irish and Puerto Rican)

Its founders wanted to create an outlet for all women with an emphasis on sisterhood, diversity, leadership, service, and academic excellence. The sorority is Latina-oriented, not Latina-based.

The sorority initially expanded on the East Coast but has since formed chapters at colleges and universities in the Midwest, California, and Southeast. It was a founding member organization of the National Association of Latino Fraternal Organizations (NALFO).

== Symbols ==
Omega Phi Beta's ideals or pillars are sisterhood, diversity, leadership, service, and academic excellence. The sorority's motto is Spanish: Sirviendo y Educando a Través de Nuestra Diversidad, lit. 'Serving and Educating Through Our Diversity'.

Omega Phi Beta's colors are black, forest green, and radiant gold. Its flower is the sunflower. Its mascot is the hummingbird. The sorority's nicknames are Betas, Radiant Sisters, and OPB.

== Activities ==
Omega Phi Beta was the first Latina sorority to participate in and win Step Correct, a traditionally National Pan-Hellenic Council competition. In 2007, MTV's True Life featured the journey of the Soul Steppin' Divas National Step Team compete in the episode "I'm Stepping". In 2014, the Art of Stepping team was inducted to the Art of Step/Stroll Hall of Fame.

== Philanthropy ==
Omega Phi Beta's national philanthropy, Raising Awareness of Violence Against Women, includes all forms of violence affecting women, including domestic violence, sexual assault, sexual harassment, sexual mutilation, stalking and human trafficking. It has also helped to raise over ten thousand dollars towards AIDS research.

=== Omega Phi Beta Foundation ===
Omega Phi Beta Foundation is a national philanthropic organization committed to initiatives that build a safe and equitable world for women and girls through leadership and educational programs for communities nationwide. The foundation was created in response to the ongoing need for role models and leaders in the community.

== Chapter List ==
The sorority has chartered 51 undergraduate chapters. Additionally, it has established fifteen alumnae chapters and colonies.

== Notable members ==
- Caridad de la Luz (1992), actress and poet
- Eve Torres, actress, martial arts instructor, and retired professional wrestler

== See also ==
- List of social sororities and women's fraternities
