= Lambda Pi Upsilon =

American collegiate Latina sorority

- ΛΠΥ
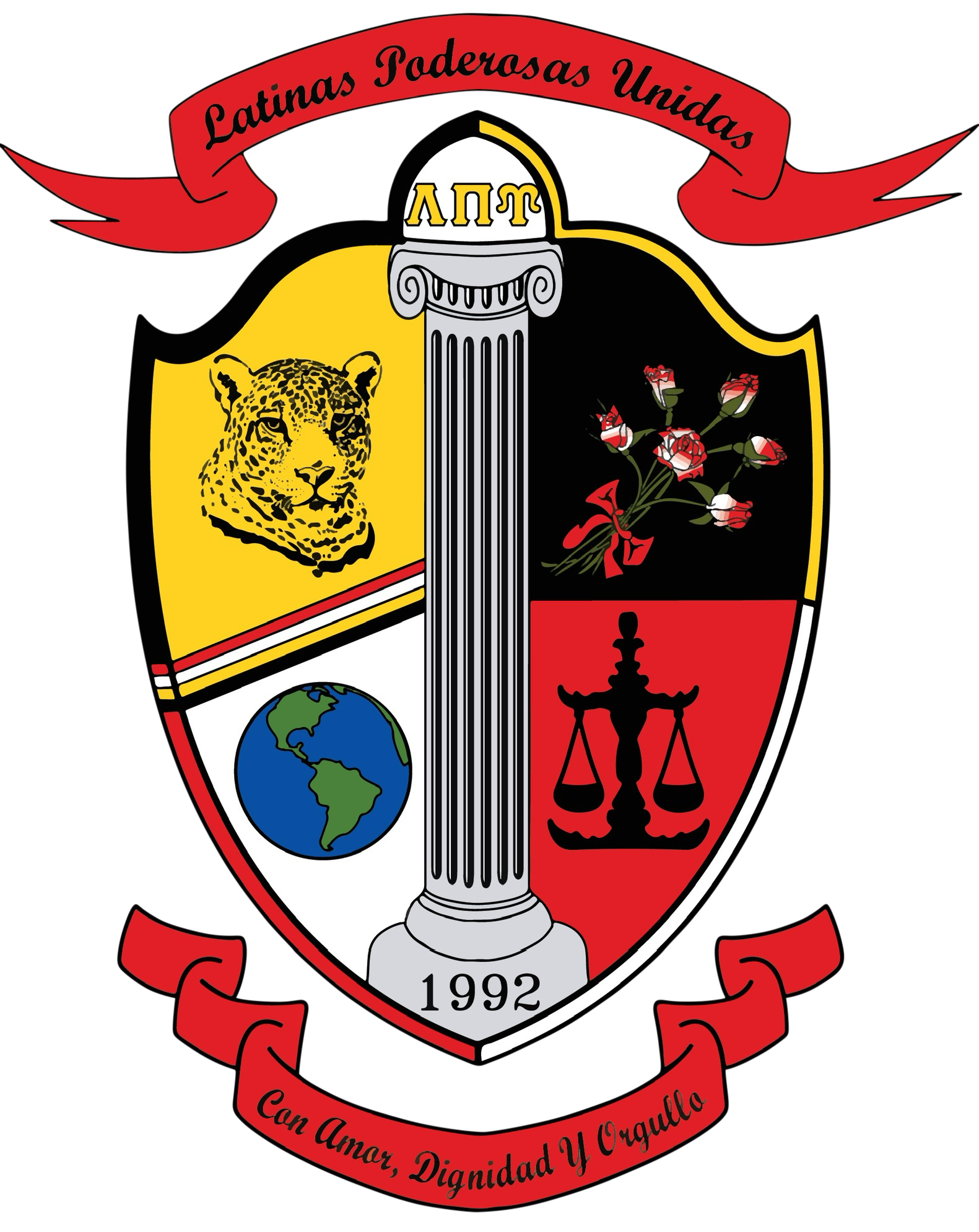
- Founded: November 6, 1992; 33 years ago SUNY Geneseo
- Type: Social
- Affiliation: NALFO
- Status: Active
- Emphasis: Latina
- Scope: National
- Motto: Con Amor, Dignidad, y Orgullo "With Love, Dignity, and Pride"
- Pillars: Family, Advancement, Education, Motivation, Learning, and Exposure
- Colors: Red, White, Gold, and Black
- Flower: Fire and Ice Rose
- Jewel: Emerald
- Mascot: Spotted Jaguar
- Philanthropy: Children and Asthma Awareness
- Chapters: 24 Collegiate, 8 Graduate
- Nickname: Poderosas, Lambda Divas, LPiU
- Headquarters: New York City, New York; United States
- Website: www.lambdapiupsilon.org

Lambda Pi Upsilon Sorority, Latinas Poderosas Unidas, Inc. (ΛΠΥ, LPiU), is a Latina based national sorority founded in 1992 at the State University of New York at Geneseo. Its founders believed that the problems of womanhood, particularly those of Latinas, needed to be addressed and resolved on campus by seeking unity and cultural identity.

Lambda Pi Upsilon Sorority, Inc. is a Latina-based sorority.

The sorority is a member of the National Association of Latino Fraternal Organizations (NALFO).

== History ==
Lambda Pi Upsilon began with six women at the State University of New York at Geneseo who sought to fight and address increasing social issues involving women in their community, particularly Latina women. Located on a predominantly caucasian campus, these six women were driven to find a sense of unity and commonality by approaching the ideas of cultural identity and growth of mind. They created Lambda Pi Upsilon Sorority Inc. on November 6, 1992. Referred to as the Six Pillars of Strength or the Founding Mothers, these women were:

- Sandra Mosquera-Valerio
- Lisette Pineda
- Maria Fritz-Rodriguez
- Glorivy Arce
- Ebony Robinson
- Nancy Martinez

Lambda Pi Upsilon seeks to "empower initiates to educate others about the fallacy of the negative stereotypes that surround Latinos, to act as a role model, to work for the advancement of women, and to emphasize the importance of higher education."

The sorority is a member of the National Association of Latino Fraternal Organizations (NALFO). It is overseen by a national board of directors based in New York City. Leaders meet at the Empowerment Conference which is a convention held each January.

== Symbols and traditions ==
The sorority's colors are red, white, gold, and black. Its mascot is the spotted jaguar and its gemstone is the emerald. Its flower is the "Fire and Ice" rose, a white rose with red tips. Members are referred to as Lambda Divas and experience a sisterhood or Hermandad.

The motto of Lambda Pi Upsilon is Con Amor, Dignidad, y Orgullo or "With Love, Dignity, and Pride". The sorority's six founding principles or pillars of strength are family, advancement, education, motivation, learning, and exposure or the acronym F.E.M.A.L.E.

== Membership ==
Lambda Pi Upsilon Sorority, Latinas Poderosas Unidas, Inc. welcomes women who are interested in a young and developing organization who also want to become leaders within their communities. Although the sorority is Latina-based, membership is not exclusive to Latina women.

== Activities ==
Members of Lambda Pi Upsilon host numerous annual events for members and other people to attend. The Sisterhood Retreat is a legacy that was started by the founding mothers to help members of the sorority to bond with each other over a weekend of workshops and storytelling each August. The first Sisterhood Retreat was held on August 4–6, 1995 in SUNY Geneseo.

The Emerald Gala is an event hosted in New York City every five years to celebrate the growth and accomplishments of the organization.

Chapters also help with campus celebrations of Hispanic Heritage Month.

The sorority also has a national performance team, Divalución.

== Philanthropy ==
As an organization, Lambda Pi Upsilon adopted children as its national philanthropy. However, with the death of one of their members from asthma, Lambda Pi Upsilon has also focused its attention on asthma awareness as part of their philanthropic work and also partner with the American Lung Association for various awareness activities.

At a local level, chapters and members of Lambda Pi Upsilon also participate in other events and support other charities, including the AIDS Walk, autism awareness, Breast Cancer Walk, and the March of Dimes.

== Chapters ==
=== Undergraduate Chapters ===
The undergraduate chapters of Lambda Pi Upsilon:

Chapter	Charter date and range	Institution	City	State or province	Status	Ref.
Almighty Alpha (Α)	November 6, 1992	State University of New York at Geneseo	Geneseo	New York	Active	
Beautiful Beta (Β)	November 19, 1994	Buffalo Region (University of Buffalo and Buffalo State College)	Buffalo	New York	Active	
Gorgeous Gamma (Γ)	April 30, 1995	Rochester Region	Rochester	New York	Active	
Divine Delta (Δ)	May 26, 1996	Columbia University	New York	New York	Active	
Elegant Epsilon (Ε)	April 26, 1997	St. John's University	Queens	New York	Active	
Glorious Graduate Zeta (Ζ)		Letter reserved for Graduate/Professional Chapter			N/A	
Exquisite Eta (Η)	December 27, 1999	Westchester Region	Westchester	New York	Active	
Thunderous Theta (Θ)	May 6, 2000	University of Connecticut	Storrs	Connecticut	Active	
Irresistible Iota (Ι)	April 27, 2003	New York University	New York	New York	Active	
Kataclysmic Kappa (Κ)	January 2, 2005	University of Illinois at Urbana-Champaign	Champaign	Illinois	Active	
Luscious Lambda (Λ)	April 17, 2005	Syracuse Region	Syracuse	New York	Active	
Mesmerizing Mu (Μ)	April 14, 2007	New York City Metropolitan Region	New York	New York	Active	
Neumatic Nu (Ν)	February 27, 2008	Boston Region (Newbury College, Boston College, Boston University and Northeastern University)	Boston	Massachusetts	Active	
Xhilarating Xi (Ξ)	April 4, 2009	Southern Connecticut State University	New Haven	Connecticut	Active	
Outrageous Omicron (Ο)	April 10, 2010	State University of New York at New Paltz	New Paltz	New York	Active	
Perpetual Pi (Π)					Memorial	
Relentless Rho (Ρ)	May 8, 2011	Fairleigh Dickinson University Metropolitan Campus	Teaneck	New Jersey	Active	
Sensational Sigma (Σ)	May 5, 2013	University of Bridgeport	Bridgeport	Connecticut	Active	
Tremendous Tau (Τ)	December 14, 2013	New Jersey City University	Jersey City	New Jersey	Active	
Unbreakable Upsilon (Υ)	October 31, 2015	University of New Haven	New Haven	Connecticut	Active	
Phenomenal Phi (Φ)	March 31, 2018	State University of New York at Plattsburgh	Plattsburgh	New York	Active	
Courageous Chi (Χ)	September 23, 2018	Wichita State University	Wichita	Kansas	Active	
Synergetic Psi (Ψ)	March 16, 2019	Binghamton University	Binghamton	New York	Active	
Omnipotent Omega (Ω)	November 3, 2019	Pittsburg State University	Pittsburgh	Kansas	Active	
Alluring & Ambitious Alpha Alpha (ΑΑ)	March 24, 2019	Trinity College	Hartford	Connecticut	Active	
Audacious & Boundless Alpha Beta (ΑΒ)	November 23, 2025	University of Massachusetts Amherst	Amherst	Massachusetts	Active	

=== Glorious Graduate Chapters ===
Zeta Regional Graduate Regions

Chapter	Charter date and range	Area	Status	Ref.
Zeta Alpha (ΖΑ)	December 27, 1999	New York City Region	Active	
Zeta Beta (ΖΒ)	December 7, 2002	New York Upstate Region	Active	
Zeta Gamma (ΖΓ)	October 15, 2008	Florida Region	Inactive	
Zeta Delta (ΖΔ)	October 18, 2009	Connecticut Region	Active	
Zeta Epsilon (ΖΕ)	October 18, 2009	Service Members Division	Inactive	
Zeta Zeta (ΖΖ)	November 19, 2010	Illinois Region	Inactive	
Zeta Eta (ΖΗ)	November 19, 2010	Massachusetts Region	Inactive	
Zeta Theta (ΖΘ)	November 19, 2010	New Jersey Region	Inactive	

== See also ==
- List of social sororities and women's fraternities
- Cultural interest fraternities and sororities
