= Lambda Pi Chi =

American Latina collegiate sorority

- ΛΠΧ
- Founded: April 16, 1988; 38 years ago Cornell University
- Type: Social
- Affiliation: NALFO
- Status: Active
- Emphasis: Cultural Interest - Latina, multicultural
- Scope: National
- Motto: La Hermandad Nunca Termina
- Pillars: La Cultura Latina, La Comunidad and La Hermandad
- Colors: Red, Gold, Black, and White
- Flower: Red carnation
- Jewel: Fire opal
- Mascot: Butterfly
- Chapters: 31 undergraduate, 14 professional/graduate
- Nickname: Pi Chis
- Headquarters: P.O. Box 1522; New York City, New York 10028; United States
- Website: Lambda Pi Chi website

Lambda Pi Chi Sorority, Incorporated (ΛΠΧ) (also known as Latinas Promoviendo Comunidad/Lambda Pi Chi Sorority, Inc.) is a Latina-based, but not Latina-exclusive Greek letter intercollegiate sorority founded on April 16, 1988, at Cornell University by five women.

The organization is a member of the National Association of Latino Fraternal Organizations (NALFO).

== History ==
Latinas Promoviendo Comunidad/Lambda Pi Chi Sorority, Inc. was established at Cornell University on April 16, 1988. Its founders were Patricia Rivera, Maria Caban, Eva Marie Sosa-Grandison, and Migdalia Franklin, who established the sorority with the assistance of Dr. Irma Almirall-Padamsee. Although originally designated as the first honorary member of the organization, Dr. Almirall-Padamsee later came to be regarded as the sorority's fifth founder.

The sorority was founded upon three principles: La Cultura Latina (the Latino Culture), La Comunidad (the Community), and La Hermandad (the Sisterhood). The founders of Lambda Pi Chi Sorority, Inc. envisioned an organization that would embrace Latina community leaders who wanted to make a positive impact at Cornell and the Latino community at large despite institutional struggles.

"The community of Latino students and staff at that time (1988) at Cornell was very small. Although there was a student association, which two of the other founders and I started (Las Associacion de Latinas Universitarias) [The Association of Latina University Women], it became clear that what many women really wanted and needed was a means by which to foster lifelong, deep friendships. Having a formal means by which women, who were especially interested in the richness of the Latino heritage, perceived themselves as leaders for their communities and were committed to making positive change for the latino community at the university and after graduation seemed to make sense. The curriculum was overwhelmingly Euro-centric and although of top caliber theoretically, left much to be desired by students who wanted to learn about the history, experience, and contributions of non-European communities. Our university had experienced various building takeovers, sit-ins, and eventually a hunger strike, which were directly triggered by Latino and black student dissatisfaction with the university's inability and seeming unwillingness to meaningfully address the financial, educational, and social needs of the students of color on campus."

— Irma Almirall-Padamsee, Nuestra Historia y Futuro (Our History and Future): Latino/a Fraternities and Sororities

Lambda Pi Chi Sorority, Inc. was incorporated on April 8, 1991; it was the first Latina sorority incorporated in New York state. The sorority received strong community support during its establishment on campus from the fraternities Lambda Upsilon Lambda and Alpha Phi Alpha (who were also founded at Cornell University) and the student organization La Asociacion Latina. During the organization's 2015 National Convention, members voted to become trans-inclusive, becoming the first National Association of Latino Fraternal Organizations (NALFO) sorority member to do so.

On March 25, 2017, Lambda Pi Chi established its first chapter at a historically black college and university (HBCU), North Carolina Central University. It is the first Latina-based, but not Latina exclusive sorority on the campus and the second NALFO sorority to establish a chapter at a HBCU.

== Symbols ==
The motto of Lambda Pi Chi is La Hermandad Nunca Termina. Its ideals or pillars are La Cultura Latina, La Comunidad, and La Hermandad.

The sorority's colors are red, gold, black, and white. Its flower is the red carnation. Its jewel is the fire opal, and its mascot is the butterfly in flight.

== Philanthropy ==
Lambda Pi Chi focuses on serving the Latino community with an emphasis on the Latina, communities of color, and members of other underserved communities. The sorority has two public service projects, L.E.A.A.P: Latinas Educating on AIDS Awareness and Prevention and Proyecto H.A.C.E.R (Hacer in Spanish means to make, to build, to do).

On July 14, 2016, Lambda Pi Chi Sorority two scholarship opportunities in honor of deceased members Fanny D. Carela and Gabby Oberti. The scholarships are intended to embody the spirit and passion of the Hermanas and also invest in the advancement and education of La Hermanadad (the Sisterhood) and La Comunidad (the Community).

== Chapters ==
=== Collegiate chapters ===
Following is a list of the collegiate chapters and provisional chapters (colonies) of Lambda Pi Chi. Active chapters are indicated in bold. Inactive chapters are in italics.

Chapter	Charter date	Institution	Location	Status	Ref.
**Alpha**	April 16, 1988	Cornell University	Ithaca, New York	Active	
**Alpha**	April 16, 1988	Ithaca College	Ithaca, New York	Active	
**Beta**	April 20, 1991	Columbia University	New York City, New York	Active	
**Beta**	April 20, 1991	City College of New York	New York City, New York	Active	
**Gamma**	February 28, 1993	University at Albany, SUNY	Albany, New York	Active	
**Delta**	May 13, 1995	New York University	New York City, New York	Active	
**Epsilon**	November 23, 1996	American University	Washington, D.C.	Active	
**Epsilon**	November 23, 1996	Georgetown University	Washington, D.C.	Active	
**Zeta**	April 5, 1997	Syracuse University	Syracuse, New York	Active	
**Eta**	April 27, 1997	Wesleyan University	Middletown, Connecticut	Active	
**Theta**	December 6, 1997	George Washington University	Washington, D.C.	Active	
**Iota**	April 4, 1998	University of Massachusetts Amherst	Amherst, Massachusetts	Active	
**Iota**	April 4, 1998	Smith College	Northampton, Massachusetts	Active	
**Kappa**	October 31, 1998	Duke University	Durham, North Carolina	Active	
**Lambda**	March 20, 1999	University of Rochester	Rochester, New York	Active	
**Lambda**	March 20, 1999	Rochester Institute of Technology	Henrietta, New York	Active	
**Mu**	November 6, 1999	George Mason University	Fairfax, Virginia	Active	
**Nu**	December 4, 1999	Harvard University	Cambridge, Massachusetts	Active	
**Nu**	December 4, 1999	Northeastern University	Boston, Massachusetts	Active	
**Nu**	December 4, 1999	Tufts University	Medford and Somerville, Massachusetts	Active	
**Xi**	December 3, 2000	St. John's University	New York City, New York	Active	
**Omicron**	November 26, 2001	University of Delaware	Newark, Delaware	Active	
Pi				Unassigned	(Note: The letter Pi is reserved for professional and graduate chapters.)
**Rho**	March 30, 2003	North Carolina State University	Raleigh, North Carolina	Active	
**Sigma**	April 12, 2004	Johns Hopkins University	Baltimore, Maryland	Active	
**Tau**	June 5, 2005	Union College	Schenectady, New York	Active	
**Upsilon**	April 24, 2010	LIU Post	Brookville, New York	Active	
**Phi**	April 24, 2010	University of North Carolina at Chapel Hill	Chapel Hill, North Carolina	Active	
**Chi**	June 6, 2011	University of Chicago	Chicago, Illinois	Active	
**Psi**	March 23, 2013	St. Thomas Aquinas College	Sparkill, New York	Active	
Omega				Memorial	(Note: This chapter name is reserved in memory of deceased Hermanas.)
**Alpha Alpha**	April 16, 2016	Saint Leo University	St. Leo, Florida	Active	
**Alpha Beta**	March 26, 2017	North Carolina Central University	Durham, North Carolina	Active	
**Alpha Gamma**	December 1, 2018	Davidson College	Davidson, North Carolina	Active	
**Alpha Delta**	November 10, 2018	Rutgers University–New Brunswick	New Brunswick, New Jersey	Active	
**Alpha Epsilon**	March 10, 2018	Campbell University	Buies Creek, North Carolina	Active	
**Alpha Zeta**	April 20, 2019	High Point University	High Point, North Carolina	Active	
**Alpha Eta**	February 23, 2020	Western Carolina University	Cullowhee, North Carolina	Active	
**Rhodes College Provisional Chapter**		Rhodes College	Memphis, Tennessee	Colony	
**Virginia Tech Provisional Chapter**		Virginia Tech	Blacksburg, Virginia	Colony	

=== Professional and graduate chapters ===
The sorority allows for graduate chapters for those seeking participation after college, or for alumnae initiates. Following is a list of its professional/graduate chapters. Active chapters are indicated in bold. Inactive chapters are in italics.

Chapter	Charter date	Location	Status	Ref.
**Pi Alpha**	August 9, 1997	New York City, New York	Active	
**Pi Beta**	July 10, 1998	Washington, D.C.	Active	
**Pi Gamma**	August 7, 1999	Miami, Florida	Active	
**Pi Delta**		Upstate New York	Active	
**Pi Epsilon**	July 25, 2005	Rochester, New York	Active	
**Pi Zeta**	March 30, 2010	Southern California	Active	
**Pi Eta**	March 19, 2011	New Jersey	Active	
**Pi Theta**	September 7, 2011	Boston, Massachusetts	Active	
**Pi Iota**	March 22, 2013	North Carolina	Active	
**Pi Kappa**	June 2, 2013	Long Island, New York	Active	
**Pi Lambda**	October 28, 2013	Houston, Texas	Active	
**Pi Mu**	July 27, 2019	Central Florida	Active	
**Pi Nu**	November 18, 2018	Maryland	Active	
**Pi Xi**	20xx ?	Delaware	Active	
Pi Omicron	Nov 16, 2024	Bronx, New York City	Active	
Pi Pi	Nov 16, 2024	West Chester Cty, NY	Active	

== See also ==
- List of social sororities and women's fraternities
