= Gamma Alpha Omega =

American collegiate Latina sorority

- ΓΑΩ
- Founded: January 25, 1993; 33 years ago Arizona State University
- Type: Social
- Affiliation: NALFO
- Status: Active
- Emphasis: Service
- Scope: National
- Motto: Nos Una Crescemus "United We Will Grow"
- Pillars: Honesty, Integrity, Leadership, Scholarship, and Unity
- Colors: Forest Green, Navy Blue, and White
- Flower: White thornless rose
- Jewel: Diamond, sapphire, and emerald
- Mascot: White Bengal tiger with blue eyes
- Publication: The ROSE Vine
- Philanthropy: Education (mentoring youth)
- Chapters: 28 collegiate 13 alumnae
- Members: 1,500 lifetime
- Nickname: Gammas, Tigresas
- Fruit: Classic red Apple
- Headquarters: P.O. Box 1916; Tempe, Arizona 85280; United States
- Website: www.gammaalphaomega.org

Gamma Alpha Omega (ΓΑΩ) is a Latina-founded Greek letter intercollegiate sorority, established in 1993 on the campus of Arizona State University in Tempe, Arizona. The sorority has installed 28 collegiate chapters and 13 alumnae chapters.

== History ==
Gamma Alpha Omega was founded at the Arizona State University on January 25, 1993 as a multicultural sorority for Latina women. It founders were eight Latina students: Amy Alvarez, Annette Escalante, Patsy Guardado, Clara Lopez, Valerie Mendoza, Roxana Quinones, Sandra Saenz, and Michelle Seañez.

Gamma Alpha Omega was formed to promote "achievement and quest of higher education amongst all women". Although established by Latinas it was open from the start to women of all backgrounds. Its mission is noted with four goals:

- Increase the number of women with college educations and advanced degrees.
- Provide mentors for youth, women and underrepresented communities,
- Support individual leaders in each member
- Provide lifelong support for sisters, rooted in the pillars of Honesty, Integrity, Leadership, Scholarship and Unity.

The sorority founded its second chapter at the University of Arizona on August 8, 1993. On January 24, 1997, Gamma Alpha Omega expanded beyond Arizona with the founding of Gamma chapter at the University of Washington. In 2000, the sorority became a founding member of the National Association of Latino Fraternal Organizations (NALFO) when it emerged as a national association of Latino fraternal groups.

Gamma Alpha Omega incorporated in the state of Arizona in April 2001. In January 2016, Gamma Alpha Omega withdrew from NALFO alongside several other founding fraternity and sorority members of the council. It would then rejoin the association in December 2025.

== Symbols ==
ΓΑΩ's official logo, the White Rose within a Blue Diamond.

Gamma Alpha Omega's motto is Nos Una Crescemus or "United We Will Grow". Its pillars are honesty, integrity, leadership, scholarship and unity.

At its founding the sorority chose the colors forest green, navy blue and white. Its mascot is a white Bengal tiger with blue eyes. Its flower is the white thornless rose. Its jewels are the emerald, sapphire and diamond. Its fruit is the red apple.

The sorority publishes a digital magazine twice annually called The ROSE Vine. Its nicknames are the Gammas and Tigresas.

== Activities ==
Gamma Alpha Omega's national philanthropies are Emeralds for Education and HIV Awareness. Emeralds of Education is a youth mentoring program established by the sorority in 2011.

== Governance ==
Governance of the sorority is vested in a National Executive Board, including a national president, vice president, vice president of collegiate affairs, vice president of communication, vice president of expansion, vice president of finance, vice president of programming, vice president of standards, and vice president of alumnae affairs. In addition, its national administration also contains regional and national directors that assist with the different regions, areas, and departments with the national office and headquarters. Its national headquarters are in Tempe, Arizona.

The sorority meets in a national convention every two years during odd-numbered years. Regional conferences are held in the off years between national conventions.

== Chapters ==
=== Collegiate chapters ===
In the following list of Gamma Alpha Omega collegiate chapters, active chapters noted in bold and inactive chapters or institutions noted in italics.

| Chapter | Charter date and range | Institution | Location | Status | Ref. |
|---|---|---|---|---|---|
| **Alpha** | January 25, 1993 | Arizona State University | Phoenix, Arizona | Active | |
| **Beta** | August 8, 1993 | University of Arizona | Tucson, Arizona | Active | |
| **Gamma** | January 24, 1997 | University of Washington | Seattle, Washington | Active | |
| **Delta** | 1998 | Washington State University | Pullman, Washington | Active | |
| Epsilon | 1998–20xx ? | University of Wisconsin–Parkside | Somers, Wisconsin | Inactive | |
| Zeta | 1998–200x ? | Loyola University Chicago | Chicago, Illinois | Inactive | |
| **Eta** | 1999 | University of Idaho | Moscow, Idaho | Active | |
| **Theta** | 1999–xxxx ?; 2022 | University of Wisconsin Oshkosh | Oshkosh, Wisconsin | Active | |
| **Iota** | October 29, 1999 | Texas Tech University | Lubbock, Texas | Active | |
| **Kappa** | 2000 | Oregon State University | Corvallis, Oregon | Active | |
| **Lambda** | 2000 | University of Houston | Houston, Texas | Active | |
| **Mu** | 2001 | University of Wisconsin–Milwaukee | Milwaukee, Wisconsin | Active | |
| **Nu** | April 12, 2002 | Baylor University | Waco, Texas | Active | |
| **Xi** | 2001 | University of Houston–Downtown | Houston, Texas | Active | |
| **Omicron** | 2002 | Northern Arizona University | Flagstaff, Arizona | Active | |
| Pi | 2002–20xx ? | California State Polytechnic University, Humboldt | Arcata, California | Inactive | |
| Rho | 2003–20xx ? | California State University, Northridge | Northridge, Los Angeles, California | Inactive | |
| **Sigma** | 2003 | University of the Pacific | Stockton, California | Active | |
| Tau | 2008–20xx ? | University of Illinois Urbana-Champaign | Champaign–Urbana, Illinois | Inactive | |
| **Upsilon** | 2009 | University of Oregon | Eugene, Oregon | Active | |
| Phi | 2010–20xx ? | University of Wisconsin–Whitewater | Whitewater, Wisconsin | Inactive | |
| **Chi** | September 30, 2011 | University of Wisconsin–Madison | Madison, Wisconsin | Active | |
| **Psi** | 2011 | Eastern Washington University | Cheney, Washington | Active | |
| Omega | | | | Memorial | |
| Alpha Alpha | 2012–20xx ? | University of New Mexico | Albuquerque, New Mexico | Inactive | |
| **Alpha Beta** | 2013 | California State University, Fresno | Fresno, California | Active | |
| Alpha Gamma | 2017–20xx ? | New Mexico Highlands University | Las Vegas, New Mexico | Inactive | |
| **Alpha Delta** | 2018 | Heritage University | Toppenish, Washington | Active | |
| **Alpha Epsilon** | September 4, 2019 | Texas A&M University | College Station, Texas | Active | |
| **Alpha Zeta** | 2020 | Carroll University | Waukesha, Wisconsin | Active | |
| **Alpha Eta** | February 17, 2024 | Xavier University | Cincinnati, Ohio | Active | |
| **Alpha Theta** | March 31, 2025 | University of North Texas at Dallas | Dallas, Texas | Active | |

=== Alumnae chapters ===
Following are the alumnae chapters of Gamma Alpha Omega.

| Chapter | Location | Status | Ref. |
|---|---|---|---|
| Greater Phoenix Alumnae Chapter | Phoenix, Arizona | Active | |
| Greater Seattle Alumnae Chapter | Seattle, Washington | Active | |
| Greater Milwaukee Alumnae Chapter | Milwaukee, Wisconsin | Active | |
| Greater Houston Alumnae Chapter | Houston, Texas | Active | |
| Chicago Alumnae Chapter | Chicago, Illinois | Active | |
| Greater Whitewater Alumnae Chapter | Whitewater, Wisconsin | Active | |
| Madison Alumnae Chapter | Madison, Wisconsin | Active | |
| Dallas/Ft.Worth Alumnae Chapter | Dallas and Fort Worth, Texas | Active | |
| Palouse Alumnae Chapter | Palouse, Washington and Idaho | Active | |
| Corvallis Alumnae Chapter | Corvallis, Oregon | Active | |
| Portland Alumnae Chapter | Portland, Oregon | Active | |
| Fresno Alumnae Chapter | Fresno, Texas | Active | |
| TriCities Alumnae Chapter | Tri-Cities, Washington | Active | |

== See also ==
- List of Latino fraternities and sororities
- List of social sororities and women's fraternities
