= Lambda Alpha Upsilon =

American Latino-interest college fraternity

- ΛΑΥ
- Founded: December 10th, 1985; 40 years ago State University of New York at Buffalo
- Type: Social
- Affiliation: NALFO; NIC
- Status: Active
- Emphasis: Latino
- Scope: National
- Motto: ¡Venceremos porque Nacimos para Triunfar!
- Colors: Red, Yellow, White and Black
- Mascot: Andean condor
- Chapters: 25 undergraduate, 7 alumni
- Colonies: 10
- Nickname: Lethal Lambdas
- Headquarters: 1162 St. Georges Avenue Suite #258; Avenel, New Jersey 07001; United States
- Website: www.lambdas.com

Latino America Unida, Lambda Alpha Upsilon Fraternity, Inc. (ΛΑΥ or LAU, also known as Condors) is a Latino oriented Greek letter intercollegiate fraternity founded in 1985, at the State University of New York at Buffalo. In 1998, it became the first East Coast based fraternity to join the majority West Coast and Mid-West based conference of the National Association of Latino Fraternal Organizations (NALFO) instead of the majority East Coast based ConcÌlio Nacional de Hermandades Latinas.

== History ==
Latino America Unida, Lambda Alpha Upsilon Fraternity, Inc. is a Latino oriented Greek letter intercollegiate fraternity founded on December 10, 1985, at the State University of New York at Buffalo. In the fall of 1985 at the University at Buffalo, sixteen young men of various ethnic backgrounds decided to form a support group that would provide a social and cultural outlet for students of Latin American descent. The university's Greek system lacked an organization dedicated to the needs of the Latino community. To meet those needs, the group chose to pursue recognition as the first Latino-oriented Greek-letter organization on campus.

The founding fathers are recognized by the fraternity as:

- Antonio Adorno
- José Betances
- Miguel Buitrago
- Manuel Cáceres
- José Chiu
- Ronald Ellín
- Daniel Figueroa III
- Victor Gutiérrez
- Justo León
- Julio Martínez Jr.
- José Núñez
- Antonio Rodríguez
- Daryl Salas
- Manny Sánchez
- José Soto
- Simón Vélez

After a brief period of time of being recognized as a colony of La Unidad Latina, Lambda Upsilon Lambda fraternity by their institution, the individuals who had joined the group would go on to secede from the rest of Lambda Upsilon Lambda in 1988. In the process of which, they founded the Alpha chapter of Latino America Unida, Lambda Alpha Upsilon Fraternity, Inc., with them choosing the establishment date of the former colony as the founding date for the fraternity as a whole.

In 1998, it became the first East Coast based fraternity to join the majority West Coast and Mid-West based conference of the National Association of Latino Fraternal Organizations (NALFO) instead of the majority East Coast based ConcÌlio Nacional de Hermandades Latinas.

== Symbols ==
The fraternity's motto is ¡Venceremos porque Nacimos para Triunfar!. Its colors are red, yellow, white, and black. Its mascot is the Andean condor. Its nickname is Lethal Lambdas.

== Chapters ==
=== Undergraduate chapters ===
Lambda Alpha Upsilon reserves the Lambda chapter designation for deceased Hermanos. In the chapter list below, active chapters are indicated in bold and inactive chapters are in italics.

Chapter	Charter date and range	Institution	Location	Status	Ref.
**Alpha**	1985	University at Buffalo	Buffalo, New York	Active	(Note: This chapter was initially established as a colony of Lambda Upsilon Lambda in 1985. It would go onto rebrand itself as the Alpha chapter of Lambda Alpha Upsilon in 1988.)
**Beta**	1993	Rochester Institute of Technology	Rochester, New York	Active	
**Gamma**	1994	St. John's University	New York City, New York	Active	
Delta	1996	State University of New York at Oswego	Oswego, New York	Inactive	
**Epsilon**	1996	New York Metro	New York City, New York	Active	
Zeta	1997	State University of New York at Delhi	Delhi, New York	Inactive	
Eta	1998	State University of New York at Old Westbury	Old Westbury, New York	Inactive	
**Theta**	1999	Southern Connecticut State University	New Haven, Connecticut	Active	
Iota	2001	University of Florida	Gainesville, Florida	Inactive	
Kappa	2004	University of New Haven	West Haven, Connecticut	Active	
**Lambda**				Memorial	
**Mu**	2005	University of Wisconsin–Whitewater	Whitewater, Wisconsin	Active	
Nu	2007	West Chester University	West Chester, Pennsylvania	Inactive	
**Xi**	2008	University of Connecticut	Storrs, Connecticut	Active	
**Omicron**	2009	Central Connecticut State University	New Britain, Connecticut	Active	
**Pi**	2014	Syracuse University	Syracuse, New York	Active	
**Rho**	2016	Binghamton University	Vestal, New York	Active	
**Sigma**	2016	University of Wisconsin–Milwaukee	Milwaukee, Wisconsin	Active	
Tau	2016	State University of New York at Oneonta	Oneonta, New York	Inactive	
**Upsilon**	2019	Nova Southeastern University	Fort Lauderdale and Davie, Florida	Active	
**Phi**	2019	Florida Atlantic University	Boca Raton, Florida	Active	
**Chi**	2021	State University of New York at New Paltz	New Paltz, New York	Active	
**Psi**	2019	Drexel University	Philadelphia, Pennsylvania	Active	
**Omega**	2022	Rutgers University–New Brunswick	New Brunswick, New Jersey	Active	
**Alpha Alpha**	2023	Colorado School of Mines	Golden, Colorado	Active	
**Alpha Beta**	2023	University of Denver	Denver, Colorado	Active	
**Alpha Gamma**	2024	Marquette University	Milwaukee, Wisconsin	Active	
**Alpha Delta**	2017	Florida International University	University Park, Florida	Active	
**Alpha Epsilon**	2026	Northeastern University	Boston, Massachusetts	Active	
**Trinity College Colony**	2016	Trinity College	Hartford, Connecticut	Active	
**UWP Colony**	2017	University of Wisconsin–Parkside	Kenosha, Wisconsin	Active	
**Syracuse Metro Colony**	2019	Le Moyne College	DeWitt, New York	Active	
**UM Colony**	2025	University of Miami	Miami, Florida	Active	
**VCU Colony**	2026	Virginia Commonwealth University	Richmond, Virginia	Active	

=== Alumni chapters ===
Iterations beginning with the letter Lambda are reserved for alumni chapters as described below. The alumni chapters of Lambda Alpha Upsilon consist of working professionals and graduate-level students who were inducted as undergraduate members and are established in the workforce or continuing their education while deciding to remain active within the fraternity. Lambda Alpha Upsilon also inducts interested men with at least a bachelor's degree into one of the alumni chapters through the Graduate Induction Process. Lambda Alpha Upsilon officially recognizes the following alumni chapters:

Chapter	Charter date	Region	Status	Ref.
Lambda Alpha	2005	Connecticut	Active	
Lambda Beta	2005	New York City Metro	Active	
Lambda Gamma	2010	Washington, D.C. Metro	Active	
Lambda Delta	2012	Rochester/Buffalo	Active	
Lambda Epsilon	2017	South Florida	Active	
Lambda Zeta	2015	Wisconsin	Active	
Lambda Eta	2017	Pennsylvania	Active	
Lambda Theta	2024	New Jersey	Active	
Lambda Iota	2024	Colorado	Active	

== Affiliations ==
The fraternity is a founding member of the National Association of Latino Fraternal Organizations.

== See also ==
- List of social fraternities and sororities
