= Chi Upsilon Sigma =

National collegiate Latina sorority

- ΧΥΣ
- Founded: April 29, 1980; 46 years ago Rutgers University–New Brunswick
- Type: Social
- Affiliation: NALFO
- Status: Active
- Emphasis: Cultural interest - Latinas
- Scope: National
- Motto: "Wisdom Through Education"
- Colors: Red, Black, and Beige
- Symbol: Almighty Owl
- Flower: Hibiscus
- Jewel: Emerald
- Philanthropy: Girls, Inc.
- Chapters: 76 collegiate, 13 graduate
- Nickname: Women of Wisdom, Cussies, CUS
- Headquarters: 280 Madison Avenue; Suit 912-255; New York City, New York 10016; United States
- Website: www.justbecus.org

Chi Upsilon Sigma (ΧΥΣ) ("Women of Wisdom")—official name is Corazones Unidos Siempre Chi Upsilon Sigma National Latin Sorority, Inc. (Hearts United Always)—is a Latin-based Greek letter intercollegiate sorority. Chi Upsilon Sigma was founded in 1980 at the New Brunswick Campus of Rutgers University in New Brunswick, New Jersey.

The sorority is a member of the National Association of Latino Fraternal Organizations (NALFO).

== History ==
Chi Upsilon Sigma was founded on April 29, 1980 by seven Latinas at the Rutgers University–New Brunswick. The seven founding mothers are Evelyn Burgos, Nancy Collazo, Mariela Freay, Catherine Miranda, Maricel Rivera, Sonia Rosa, and Maria E. Tejera.

Due to shifts in the cultural and political arenas, the late 1970s and early 1980s were a thriving time for the Latino community in the Northeastern United States. Activism on college campuses was common ground. Corazones Unidos Siempre/Chi Upsilon Sigma Sorority, Inc. was formed to challenge inequality, poor funding, and inferior quality of life for Latino students. Corazones Unidos Siempre was formed with three goals: to provide service, encourage communication, and develop community awareness.

The sorority joined the National Association of Latino Fraternal Organizations (NALFO) on October 14, 2000.

== Symbols ==
The sorority's colors are red, black, and beige. Its symbol is the Almighty Owl and its flower is the hibiscus. Its jewel is the emerald. Its motto is "Wisdom Through Education".

== Philanthropy ==
Chi Upsilon Sigma's national philanthropy is Girls, Inc..

== See also ==
- Cultural interest fraternities and sororities
- List of social sororities and women's fraternities
