= Lambda Theta Nu =

American Latina-based collegiate sorority

- ΛΘΝ
- Founded: March 11, 1986; 40 years ago California State University, Chico
- Type: Social
- Affiliation: NALFO
- Status: Active
- Emphasis: Academic - Latin culture
- Scope: National
- Pillars: Academic Excellence, Community Service, and Sisterhood
- Colors: Silver, Burgundy, and White
- Symbol: Rose
- Philanthropy: Tijeras
- Chapters: 45
- Nickname: Lambdas and Sexy Silver Roses
- Headquarters: 1220 Rosecrans #543; San Diego, California 92106; United States
- Website: www.lambdathetanu.org

Lambda Theta Nu (ΛΘΝ) is a Latina-based Greek letter intercollegiate sorority founded in 1986 at California State University, Chico.

== History ==
=== Formation ===
Eighteen Latina students at California State University, Chico banded together during what they termed "a time of social struggles for Latinos, particularly those seeking higher education", forming a new sorority on March 11, 1986 which they named Lambda Theta Nu.

The sorority explains that the Founders surpassed the status quo for Latinas of the day by attending college; by having strength in numbers they created a support system to be respected and recognized on their merits.

=== Founding Mothers ===
- Leticia Campos
- Mary Helen Coronado
- Pamela Daña
- Abigail Estrada
- Cecilia Fabian
- Guadalupe Favela
- Maria Gonzalez
- Josephine Hernandez
- Theresa Jauregui
- Patricia Lozano
- Luz Amelia Martinez
- Rosa Meza
- Imelda Michel
- Rosana Michel
- Teresa Reyes
- Camille Rugama
- Lisa Saldano
- Rosabelia Sanchez

Early advocacy for the advancement of Latino and other minority communities remains a central part of the motivation of the sorority.

=== Purpose ===
The purpose of Lambda Theta Nu Sorority, Inc. was set forth at its founding. "[Our purpose] shall be to open doors of opportunity to the Latinas in our community. The primary focus is academic excellence and meeting the needs of Latina women in higher education. Lambda Theta Nu Sorority, Inc. also promotes the advancement of Latinas through various campus activities and community services, and provides an environment for personal growth within a unit of sisterhood. Lambda Theta Nu Sorority Inc.'s priorities, however, will be placed on academic excellence and community service."

=== Ongoing growth ===
Lambda Theta Nu has established 44 chapters since it began. Members are chosen on the basis of academic achievement (a 2.6 GPA is required to remain a member in good standing, and academic workshops are required by each chapter.) Along with academics, philanthropy and service are woven into its programming.

Lambda Theta Nu members regularly perform step dances with machetes. "Strolling" or "Party Walking" is another widely enjoyed event, performed in unison to rhythmic beats; the sorority competes for the best step and stroll performances in competitions nationally. The sorority claims it was first introduced to step dancing by Delta Sigma Theta, an historically African-American sorority, in 1987.

The sorority maintains a national alumnae association, the National Association of Lambda Alumnae.

In 1998 the sorority was a founding member of the National Association of Latino Fraternal Organizations (NALFO).

== Symbols ==
The sorority's colors are silver, burgundy, and white. Its symbol is the rose.

== Philanthropy ==
The sorority's Tijeras National Community Service Program has been a focus of philanthropy since Lambda Theta Nu was formed. Tijeras addresses the Latino communities educational needs by focusing in the areas of Latino leadership and Latino literacy. The National community service program has two components, academic excellence and community service represented by Latina Youth Leadership Conference and Latino Literacy Fund.

== Lambda Scholarship ==
One of the main goals of Lambda Theta Nu Sorority, Inc. is to encourage and assist Latinas in the advancement of higher education, dedication to community service, and to provide an environment for personal growth within a unit of sisterhood. The organization does not only focus on its active members, but in the overall Latino community. In order to further their interest in helping out the Latino community, as a national organization Lambda Theta Nu Sorority Inc., has established a National Latina Scholarship Fund. The scholarship is designed with the goal of assisting young high school women pursue their own educational goals. Annually, every chapter awards a scholarship to applicants in their respective community.

In 2020 the sorority announced it was offering $40,000 in scholarship grants to support ten Latina applicants, regardless of membership status in the sorority.

== Chapters ==
Following is a list of Lambda Theta Nu chapters. Active chapters are indicated in bold. Inactive or dormant chapters are in italics.

Chapter	Charter date and range	Institution	Location	Status	Ref.
**Alpha**	March 11, 1986	California State University, Chico	Chico, California	Active	
**Beta**	October 27, 1990	Colorado State University	Fort Collins, Colorado	Active	
**Gamma**	December 9, 1990	California State University, Fresno	Fresno, California	Active	
**Delta**	April 6, 1991	University of California, Berkeley	Berkeley, California	Active	
**Epsilon**	December 5, 1992	University of California, Davis	Davis, California	Active	
**Zeta**	April 22, 1994	California State University, Sacramento	Sacramento, California	Active	
**Eta**	October 22, 1994	Metropolitan State University of Denver	Denver, Colorado	Active	
**Theta**	January 23, 1995	California State University, Northridge	Los Angeles, California,	Active	
**Iota**	September 22, 1996	University of California, Los Angeles	Los Angeles, California	Active	
**Kappa**	April 19, 1997	University of Northern Colorado	Greeley, Colorado	Active	
**Lambda**		Reserved		Memorial	
**Mu**	November 22, 1998	University of California, Riverside	Riverside, California	Active	
**Nu**	September 26, 1999	University of California, Santa Barbara	Santa Barbara, California	Active	
**Xi**	September 23, 2000	University of California, San Diego	San Diego, California	Active	
**Omicron**	November 18, 2000	University of Nebraska Omaha	Omaha, Nebraska	Active	
**Pi**	November 18, 2000	California State University, Los Angeles	Los Angeles, California	Active	
Rho	December 19, 2000	Our Lady of the Lake University	San Antonio, Texas	Dormant	
**Sigma**	April 1, 2001	University of California, Irvine	Irvine, California	Active	
**Tau**	November 10, 2001	University of Southern California	Los Angeles, California	Active	
**Upsilon**	November 3, 2002	Sonoma State University	Rohnert Park, California	Active	
**Phi**	March 22, 2003	University of Texas at El Paso	El Paso, Texas	Active	
**Chi**	October 12, 2003	Stanford University	Stanford, California	Active	
**Psi**	December 6, 2003	Creighton University	Omaha, Nebraska	Active	
**Omega**	October 30, 2005	California State University, Monterey Bay	Monterey County, California	Active	
**Alpha Beta**	October 15, 2005	University of Nebraska at Kearney	Kearney, Nebraska	Active	
**Alpha Gamma**	July 22, 2006	University of Nebraska–Lincoln	Lincoln, Nebraska	Active	
**Alpha Delta**	September 23, 2006	Loyola Marymount University	Los Angeles, California	Active	
**Alpha Epsilon**	April 14, 2007	Iowa State University	Ames, Iowa	Active	
**Alpha Zeta**	June 21, 2007	University of San Francisco	San Francisco, California	Active	
**Alpha Eta**	June 30, 2007	San Francisco State University	San Francisco, California	Active	
**Alpha Theta**	November 13, 2007	San Jose State University	San Jose, California	Active	
**Alpha Iota**	March 14, 2008	University of Nevada, Las Vegas	Paradise, Nevada	Active	
**Alpha Kappa**	November 2, 2008	California State University, San Bernardino	San Bernardino, California	Active	
**Alpha Lambda**	March 28, 2009	Arizona State University	Tempe, Arizona	Active	
**Alpha Mu**	July 11, 2009	Western Illinois University	Macomb, Illinois	Active	
**Alpha Nu**	July 11, 2009	St. John's University	Queens, New York City, New York	Active	
**Alpha Xi**	December 11, 2010	Kansas State University	Manhattan, Kansas	Active	
**Alpha Omicron**	September 11, 2011	Colorado State University Pueblo	Pueblo, Colorado	Active	
**Alpha Pi**	January 22, 2012	University of California, Merced	Merced, California	Active	
**Alpha Rho**	April 7, 2012	California State University, Dominguez Hills	Carson, California	Active	
**Alpha Sigma**	June 22, 2013	University of Colorado Boulder	Boulder, Colorado	Active	
**Alpha Tau**	July 29, 2014	California State University, East Bay	Hayward, California	Active	
**Alpha Upsilon**	November 23, 2014	University of Iowa	Iowa City, Iowa	Active	
**Alpha Phi**	December 13, 2014	California Polytechnic State University, San Luis Obispo	San Luis Obispo, California	Active	
**Alpha Chi**	January 11, 2015	Kent State University	Kent, Ohio	Active	
**Alpha Psi**	April 9, 2023	Pepperdine University	Malibu, California	Active	

== See also ==
- List of social sororities and women's fraternities
