= National Association of Latino Fraternal Organizations =

American umbrella organization for Latino organizations

- NALFO
- Founded: 1998; 28 years ago United States
- Type: Umbrella
- Affiliation: Independent
- Status: Active
- Emphasis: Latino fraternities and sororities
- Scope: National
- Members: 17 organizations active
- Headquarters: 462B Lime Rock Road; Lakeville, Connecticut; United States
- Website: nalfo.org

The National Association of Latino Fraternal Organizations (NALFO) is an umbrella council for seventeen American Latino fraternities and sororities. It was established in 1998. The purpose of NALFO is to promote and foster positive interfraternal relations, communication, and development of all Latino fraternal organizations through mutual respect, leadership, honesty, professionalism, and education.

In 2001, it merged with the ConcÌlio Nacional de Hermandades Latinas. It includes seventeen organizations. NALFO's headquarters is located in Lakeville, Connecticut.

== History ==
Established in 1998, the National Association of Latino Fraternal Organizations set out to become the uniting force for Latino-based fraternities and sororities. Latino organizations had developed in different parts of the United States in their early years, and this created difficulties for the organizations to find information on their peer groups to come together.

NALFO primarily consisted of fraternities and sororities that originated in the Midwest and on the West Coast of the United States. A second umbrella organization, the ConcÌlio Nacional de Hermandades Latinas was founded by Phi Iota Alpha and Omega Phi Beta and primarily consisted of Hispanic and Latina-based fraternities and sororities on the East Coast.

In the winter of 2001, the NALFO and ConcÌlio Nacional de Hermandades Latinas merged under the National Association of Latino Fraternal Organizations name, establishing one umbrella organization for all Latino-based fraternities and sororities in the United States.

The organization's headquarters is located at 462B Lime Rock Road in Lakeville, Connecticut.

== Affiliate organizations ==
Following is a list of the active affiliate member organizations of the National Association of Latino Fraternal Organizations.

Name	Date joined NALFO	Type	Active chapters	Alumni chapters	Reference
Alpha Pi Sigma	October 2001	Sorority	16		
Alpha Psi Lambda	1998	Co-ed Fraternity	50	7	(Note: Founding Member of NALFO)
Chi Upsilon Sigma	October 2000	Sorority	73	9	
Gamma Phi Omega	1998	Sorority	27	5	
Gamma Zeta Alpha	1998	Fraternity	22		
Kappa Delta Chi	January 2001	Sorority	74	25	
Lambda Alpha Upsilon	1998	Fraternity	20	6	
Lambda Pi Chi	April 2000	Sorority	29	11	
Lambda Pi Upsilon	April 2000	Sorority	19	8	
Lambda Sigma Upsilon	October 2003	Fraternity	80	6	(Note: Member of the North American Interfraternity Conference.)
Lambda Theta Nu	1998	Sorority	44		
Lambda Upsilon Lambda	September 1999	Fraternity	85	17	
Omega Phi Beta	1998	Sorority	54	14	
Phi Iota Alpha	October 2003	Fraternity	82		
Sigma Iota Alpha	January 2001	Sorority	44		
Sigma Lambda Upsilon	1998	Sorority	46	18	
Sigma Omega Nu	October 2021	Sorority	16		

== Former affiliates ==
The following fraternities and sororities were previously affiliate members of the National Association of Latino Fraternal Organizations.

Name	NALFO membership range	Type	Reason for leaving NALFO	Reference
Alpha Rho Lambda	1998–October 2006	Sorority	Removed due to non-participation and insurance requirements	
Beta Lambda Delta	September 1999–October 2004	Fraternity	Removed due to defunct status	(Note: Associate member of NALFO.)
Gamma Alpha Omega	October 2000–2016	Sorority	Reasons unknown	
Lambda Theta Alpha	January 2001–winter 2014	Sorority	Reasons unknown	
Lambda Theta Phi	October 2003–winter 2014	Fraternity	NALFO's increasing regulatory nature (i.e. Hazing, GPA requirement, and membership criteria)	
Nu Alpha Kappa	1998–December 2008	Fraternity	None given	
Omega Delta Phi	1998–June 2000, June 2001–December 2008	Fraternity	Withdrew to join the Latino Fraternal Council. When LFC went defunct, ODPhi rejoined NALFO. However, it ended its membership 7 years later.	
Sigma Delta Alpha	April 2005–May 2006	Fraternity	Removed due to non-participation and insurance requirement	
Sigma Lambda Alpha	December 2011–December 2015	Sorority	Reasons unknown	
Sigma Lambda Beta	October 2003–March 2010	Fraternity	Left due to NALFO's increasing regulatory nature due to SLB's increasing multicultural membership	
Sigma Lambda Gamma	January 2001–May 2010	Sorority	Left due to a desire for autonomy and due to SLG's increasing multicultural membership	
Sigma Lambda Sigma	September 1999–October 2004	Sorority	Removed due to defunct status	

== See also ==
- List of Latino Greek-letter organizations
- List of social fraternities and sororities
- Concilio Interfraternitario Puertorriqueño de la Florida
- National APIDA Panhellenic Association
- National Multicultural Greek Council
- National Pan-Hellenic Council
- National Panhellenic Conference
- North American Interfraternity Conference
- Racism in Greek life
