= Omega Delta Phi =

American multicultural collegiate fraternity

- ΩΔΦ
- Founded: November 25, 1987; 38 years ago Texas Tech University
- Type: Social
- Affiliation: NIC
- Former affiliation: NALFO
- Status: Active
- Emphasis: Multicultural
- Scope: National
- Motto: Crescit Eundo "It grows as it goes"
- Pillars: Unity, Honesty, Integrity, Leadership
- Slogan: One Culture, Any Race
- Colors: Scarlet, Silver, and Black
- Symbol: Silver Knight
- Flag
- Flower: Silver Rose
- Mascot: Knight
- Publication: Seven Visions Magazine
- Philanthropy: Wounded Warrior Project
- Chapters: 70
- Colonies: 4
- Nickname: ODPhi, Omegas
- Headquarters: 8111 Mainland, Suite 104-424; San Antonio, Texas 78240; United States
- Website: omegadeltaphi.com

Omega Delta Phi Fraternity, Inc. (ΩΔΦ), also known as ODPhi, is an American multicultural fraternity. It was established on November 25, 1987, at Texas Tech University in Lubbock, Texas and has chartered chapters at more than seventy campuses, predominantly centered in Texas and the Southwest. Although founded mainly by Latinos, the fraternity has traditionally been open to men of different backgrounds.

Omega Delta Phi is a member of the North American Interfraternity Conference and was a founding member of National Association of Latino Fraternal Organizations.

== History ==
=== Founding ===
Omega Delta Phi was the brainchild of Joe Cereceres, a student at Texas Tech University in Lubbock, Texas. Cereceres recruited six other students and held weekly organizational meetings. At the time, not everyone was on board with starting a fraternal organization because of the negative stigma surrounding fraternities. However, the group decided that they could change that stigma through positive actions, such as a focus on graduation and service.

Much of the organization's founding was assisted by other local fraternities and sororities, most importantly by Kappa Delta Chi sorority, which was founded earlier in 1987 and with whom Omega Delta Phi shares its pillars.

On November 25, 1987, the group was officially recognized as a fraternity and granted charter status from Texas Tech University. Its founders were Joe Cereceres, Arturo Barraza, Juan Barraza, Elliot Bazan, Eugene Dominguez, Dwight Christopher Forbes, and Tommy Hurtado. In 1988, Omega Delta Phi initiated its first pledge class with twelve members which would later be known as the Charter Class.

=== Early history ===
Omega Delta Phi's early years dealt with finding an identity, including adopting a crest, sacraments, and motifs. One issue that arose was whether or not the organization would identify itself as a social or service organization. In the end, the organization identified itself as a "service/social" organization. The fraternity also adopted a policy forbidding the consumption of alcohol while wearing Omega Delta Phi paraphernalia.

Jaime Mendez started the Beta chapter of Omega Delta Phi at the University of Texas at El Paso without the consent of the original Texas Tech chapter. After some minor controversy, the chapters reconciled their differences and set up an expansion strategy that spread across the country.

=== Expansion ===
By the early 1990s, Omega Delta Phi chapters were established in Texas A&M University System, University of Texas System, New Mexico, and Arizona systems. Later, the fraternity founded chapters in cities such as the Dallas/Fort Worth Metroplex area, Houston, and Seattle. It established a short-lived international colony in Mexico City, Mexico.

In 1998, Omega Delta Phi was a founding member of National Association of Latino Fraternal Organizations (NALFO). It withdrew its membership in June 2000 to join the Latino Fraternal Council (LFC). When LFC went defunct in June 2001, the fraternity rejoined NALFO. However, it withdrew its membership in December 2008. It is currently a member of the North American Interfraternity Conference.

In 2000, Omega Delta Phi founded an alumni association to provide a support group for its alumni base. The fraternity now has several alumni chapters throughout the United States.

=== Honors ===
The National Association of Latino Fraternal Organizations named Omega Delta Phi the Fraternity of the Year for 2003, 2004, and 2005. In the summer of 2002, Texas Tech University honored the fraternity by dedicating a conference room to Omega Delta Phi.

== Symbols ==
Omega Delta Phi's motto is Crescit Eundo or "It grows as it goes". The fraternity's slogan is "One Culture, Any Race". Its sacraments or pillars are Unity, Honesty, Integrity, and Leadership. The fraternity's nickname is ODPhi.

The fraternity's colors are scarlet, silver, and black. Its mascot is the Knight. Its flower is the silver rose. Its publication is Seven Visions Magazine.

== Activities ==
Each summer, Omega Delta Phi hosts an annual national conference. Brothers participate in meetings, workshops, networking sessions, as well as showcases where teams from entities compete in various competitions. The National Alumni Association and board of directors also host meetings. Each winter, Omega Delta Phi chapters hold a national undergraduate conference, known as NUC. The conference focuses on meetings and workshops to prepare for the upcoming spring semester.

== Philanthropy ==
=== Wounded Warrior Project ===
On December 6, 2022, Omega Delta Phi announced a new philanthropic partnership with the Wounded Warrior Project that is set to begin in January 2023. The philanthropy was chosen primarily due to the large number of veterans and servicemen within the fraternity.

=== Previous philanthropies ===
In 2009, Omega Delta Phi became the second Greek letter organization to officially partner with Court Appointed Special Advocates (CASA). Omega Delta Phi provide CASA with manpower at local CASA events and raised funds for CASA. Before CASA, Omega Delta Phi has also partnered with Boys and Girls Club and United Way.

== Hazing allegations and member misconduct ==
Omega Delta Phi Fraternity, Inc. has faced allegations of misconduct, particularly related to hazing and sexual misconduct. In 2015, the chapter at California State University, Stanislaus was investigated for hazing activities. A sophomore member reported that the initiation process involved blindfolding, verbal abuse, and personal property being taken and relocated without consent. These actions led the member to leave the fraternity and prompted a university investigation, which led to the chapter's suspension.

In 2020, Omega Delta Phi addressed allegations of sexual misconduct within the organization. The fraternity released a statement acknowledging the allegations brought forward by survivors and emphasized their commitment to addressing such issues. Additionally, the Washington State University chapter responded to the sexual assault allegations highlighted by the national body by expelling three members and suspending eight others.

== See also ==
- List of social fraternities and sororities
- Cultural interest fraternities and sororities
