= Alpha Psi Lambda =

American coed Latino college fraternity

- ΑΨΛ
- Founded: February 11, 1985; 41 years ago Ohio State University
- Type: Social
- Affiliation: NALFO
- Status: Active
- Emphasis: Latino
- Scope: National
- Motto: "Together We Shall Seek the Noblest"
- Pillars: Familia, Culture, Academics, Service, Leadership
- Colors: Gold and White
- Symbol: Palm tree
- Flower: Gold rose
- Mascot: Jaguar
- Chapters: 34 active
- Colonies: 6
- Members: 4,800 lifetime
- Nickname: A-Psi
- Headquarters: 8745 West Higgins Road, Suite 110; Chicago, Illinois 60631; United States
- Website: www.alphapsilambda.org

Alpha Psi Lambda National, Inc. (ΑΨΛ) is an American co-educational, Latino-oriented fraternity. The fraternity was established in 1985 at Ohio State University in Columbus, Ohio. It was the first co-ed fraternity for Latino college students in the United States. The fraternity has chartered fifty chapters and has more than 4,800 members. It is a member of the National Association of Latino Fraternal Organizations.

== History ==
At an Hispanic leadership retreat in May 1984, a group of undergraduate students from Ohio State University identified a need for Latino organizations on campus. The students worked with Josue Cruz, an assistant vice provost for the Office of Minority Affairs, to explore possible fraternities and sororities, ultimately deciding to create a new Latino fraternity.

Alpha Psi Lambda was founded February 11,1985 at Ohio State University in Columbus, Ohio as a coeducational Latino fraternity. It was the first co-ed fraternity for Latino college students in the United States. At its founding, the fraternity identified its mission as "to promote continued personal and collective growth of our membership, success, and unity through education, leadership, cultural awareness, and community service."

Three men and ten women became Alpha Psi Lambda first members on March 10, 1985: Diana Acevedo, Juan Casimiro, Carolyn Christian, James Cordero, Tammy Harris, Clara Isern, Marisol Lugo, Yolanda Natal, Saddy Rivera, Nancy Romo, Annette Saldivar, Annette Seda, and Juan Vera. Acevedo was its founding president.

In 1988, a second chapter of Alpha Psi Lambda was established at the University of Illinois Urbana-Champaign. This was followed by a chapter at Northern Illinois University in 1989. In 1991, it had emerged out of the Midwest region with the establishment of a chapter at Southern Methodist University in Dallas, Texas.

In 1998, the fraternity became a founding member of the National Association of Latino Fraternal Organizations (NALFO), a trade association of Latino fraternities and sororities, and remains a member today. The fraternity's growth continued, with fifty chapters being chartered as of 2025. It has initiated more than 4,800 members.

Alpha Psi Lambda's national headquarters is located in Chicago, Illinois.

== Symbols ==
The motto of Alpha Psi Lambda is "Together We Shall Seek the Noblest". Its values or pillars are Familia, Culture, Academics, Service, and Leadership.

Alpha Phi Lambda's colors are gold and white. Its symbol is the palm tree. Its flower is the gold rose. Its mascot is the jaguar. The fraternity's nickname is "A-Psi".

== Activities ==
Alpha Psi Lambda's national philanthropies are the Boys & Girls Club of America, Habitat for Humanity, and St. Jude Children's Research Hospital.

== Chapters ==
Alpha Psi Lambda has chartered fifty chapters as of 2025, with 34 being active. It also has six colonies, called affiliate chapters and two alumni clubs.

== Controversies and member misconduct ==
In November 1990, the Black Greek Council at the University of Illinois Urbana-Champaign denied full membership to the campus chapter of Alpha Psi Lambda. The BGC decline to meet with the fraternity to discuss its vote. The fraternity claimed discrimination was the cause, as it has been an associate member of the Black Greek Council since May 1988. The fraternity withdrew its associate membership from BGC following the vote.

In October 2014, a member of the Northern Illinois University chapter stabbed a man who was trying to enter a party at the house of several members of the fraternity, claiming that the victim has punched him and other fraternity members when turned away from the party.

== See also ==
- List of social fraternities
- Cultural interest fraternities and sororities
