= Lambda Upsilon Lambda =

American Latino interest collegiate fraternity

- ΛΥΛ - LUL
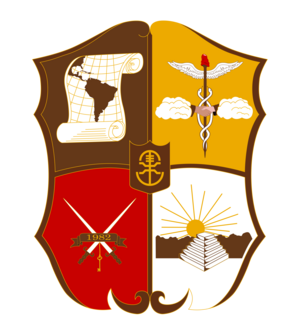
- Founded: February 19, 1982; 44 years ago Cornell University
- Type: Social
- Affiliation: NALFO
- Status: Active
- Emphasis: Cultural Interest - Latino
- Scope: National
- Motto: La Unidad Para Siempre
- Pillars: Academics, Brotherhood, Culture, and Service
- Colors: Brown, Gold, White, and Red
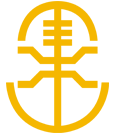
- Symbol
- Philanthropy: P.A.T.H.E. Initiative
- Chapters: 104
- Members: 3,000+ lifetime
- Nicknames: La Unidad Latina, LUL, Lambdas, Elite Lambdas
- Headquarters: 511 Sixth Avenue, PMB #39; New York City, New York 10011; United States
- Website: www.launidadlatina.org

La Unidad Latina, Lambda Upsilon Lambda Fraternity, Inc. (ΛΥΛ or LUL) is a Latino and multicultural interest collegiate fraternity. It was founded at Cornell University in Ithaca, New York on February 19, 1982, and has 85 active undergraduate chapters and nineteen graduate alumni professional chapters across 119 universities and various cities throughout the United States.

La Unidad Latina, Lambda Upsilon Lambda Fraternity, Incorporated is the only Latino and multicultural interest Greek-lettered organization to be chartered at all eight Ivy League universities and nine Colonial colleges. While founded on Latino principles, Lambda Upsilon Lambda has been open to men of all races since its inception. The fraternity is a member of the National Association of Latino Fraternal Organizations (NALFO) and is its third oldest fraternal member by founding date. It also has the second longest-running continuously active status at the collegiate level for the association and was the first active Latino interest fraternity at its time to become incorporated at the national level in 1988.

== History ==
=== Origins ===
The fraternity was founded alongside other members of the National Association of Latino Fraternal Organizations during the post-1975 wave of the Latino Greek Movement which followed the "principio" (principle) phase kickstarted by student activism on college campuses in 1898. In the 1980s, the "fuerza" (force) phase of Greek-lettered Latino organizations began as the result of Latino students feeling they had to urgently create systems where their voices could be heard and where they could help increase in the amount of Latinos enrolled in institutions nationwide. This being a primary focus of social justice activists within the community at the time as a result of the stagnant growth of Latino student enrollment during the 1980s and early 1990s.

=== Establishment ===
In the summer of 1981, Lambda Upsilon Lambda started as an idea of eleven Latino students at Cornell University, who felt the need for more brotherhood, unity, and cultural expression of their Latino heritage on campus. Founding father Hernando Londoño, who was the main pioneer among the founding line of the Latino Greek organization, argued to his peers that Latino students at Cornell only had the choice between traditionally white or historically black fraternities. Additionally, he believed that the other Latino groups on campus were not able to create a big enough sense of unity among the community there; he wanted to create an organization that would create Latino leaders who would make establishing a sense of unity among the Latino community their highest priority.

In the fall semester of 1981, after four meetings between Londoño and his fellow Latino students, it was decided to name their club "La Unidad Latina". It was then subsequently registered with the university on September 15, 1981. This club would set the foundation for discussions to create a Latino fraternity on campus. In January 1982, the fraternity was officially registered with the Cornell administration.

On February 19, 1982, an official initiation ceremony took place, with the eleven undergraduates and two additional faculty members inducting themselves as the Alpha line of the Alpha chapter of Lambda Upsilon Lambda, and referring to themselves as the Founding Fathers. The thirteen founders are: William Barba, Dennis De Jesus, Hernando Londoño, Jesse Luis, Samuel Ramos, Tomas Rincon, Edwin Rivera, Mario Rivera, Victor Rodriguez, Victor Silva, Jose Torres, Henry Villareal, and James Otto "Jim" Ziebell. The fraternity later added an additional honorary father, Angel Montañez.

Like other founding lines for Latino Greek-lettered organizations during the "fuerza" era, the founding fathers modeled their probate ceremony after the Greek-lettered organizations in the National Pan-Hellenic Council like Alpha Phi Alpha fraternity. The organization's establishment at Cornell University made it the first Latino-based fraternity to be chartered at an Ivy League institution and the third oldest to be active at the time at the collegiate level.

=== 20th century and NALFO ===
Throughout the rest of the 1980s, the fraternity expanded into eight different campuses located across the North-Eastern states of New York, Pennsylvania, and Rhode Island. The first institutions it sought to expand to were those of the State University of New York system such as University at Buffalo, Binghamton University, and the now defunct Kayne College in 1985.

In 1986, the fraternity briefly operated in a co-ed manner as the founding line of the Beta chapter at Binghamton University included two women, Carol Lasso and Vanina Gonzalez. After much debate, the fraternity's members decided to keep Lambda Upsilon Lambda from that moment on, exclusive, to those who would be comfortable being a part of a brotherhood composed predominantly of male identifying individuals. As a result, the Beta chapter and its female members decided to support the creation of a Latina sorority that would be able to unite the community's women on campus. In December 1987, Sigma Lambda Upsilon/Señoritas Latinas Unidas Sorority, became the first Latina sorority on campus.

In 1988, the Alpha chapters of both Lambda Upsilon Lambda and Alpha Phi Alpha, and the student organization La Asociacion Latina aided in the establishment of Latinas Promoviendo Comunidad/Lambda Pi Chi Sorority at their founding institution of Cornell University. This was the first Latina-focused sorority to be founded at an Ivy-league institution. That same year, a colony of the fraternity that was recognized by the University at Buffalo in 1985, for undisclosed reasons, had various of its members secede from the rest of the fraternity and establish Latino America Unida, Lambda Alpha Upsilon fraternity. Despite this, Lambda Upsilon Lambda would go on to become the first Latino interest fraternity to be incorporated at the national level later that year after the establishment of its Delta chapter in the state of Pennsylvania.

Throughout the 1990s, during the fragmentation phase of the Latino Greek Movement (which saw the creation and major expansion of many Latina Greek organizations), the fraternity was chartered at an additional 35 campuses across nine states and Washington, D.C. It also joined the National Association of Latino Fraternal Organizations in September 1999 and became the second East Coast fraternity, after Lambda Alpha Upsilon, to join the majority West Coast and Mid-West conference instead of the majority East Coast ConcÌlio Nacional de Hermandades Latinas.

In 1993, the Kappa chapter of Lambda Upsilon Lambda alongside other Latin based student organizations at Yale University supported the establishment of Alpha Rho Lambda/Alianza de Raíces Latina Sorority, Inc. This was the second Latina-focused sorority to be founded at an Ivy-league institution.

In 1999, Lambda Upsilon Lambda co-hosted a presentation by Ricardo Jiménez of the Fuerzas Armadas de Liberación Nacional Puertorriqueña at the University of Pennsylvania shortly after he and other members of the organization were given clemency by President Bill Clinton. His presentation primarily focused on the topic of Puerto Rican colonialism.

=== 21st century ===
Throughout the 2000s, 2010s, and 2020s, in the current adelante (moving forward) phase of Latino Greek organizations, the fraternity expanded to more than thirty campuses in eleven states. Lambda Upsilon Lambda has increased its presence across the southeastern United States, with it being the first Latino fraternity chartered on many campuses throughout the Mid-Atlantic region. It also established chapters in the southwest, with multiple chapters in Texas and California.

In 2006, the James Madison University chapter hosted speaker Jaime Escalante, the subject of the 1988 film Stand and Deliver which was based on his work in the Los Angeles educational system.

In May 2018, the fraternity closed its Epsilon chapter on the campuses of the University at Buffalo and Buffalo State College for undisclosed reasons, although this decision was later reversed in 2024.

On August 1, 2020, the seventh of the founding fathers of the fraternity, Edwin Rivera, died unexpectedly at the age of 59. On June 25, 2022, the 13th Founding Father of Lambda Upsilon Lambda, James Otto "Jim" Ziebell, died at the age of 67.

== Symbols ==
Lambda Upsilon Lambda's motto is La Unidad Para Siempre. The four pillars of Lambda Upsilon Lambda are to promote leadership are academics, brotherhood, culture, and service

Its colors are brown and gold, with secondary colors being white and red. These four colors are incorporated into the four quadrants of the fraternal crest. In the center of the Lambda Upsilon Lambda's crest, the mascot of the fraternity is featured on a shield. On the brown top-left quadrant, a scroll with an image of Latin America is shown. The gold top-right quadrant includes a red phrygian cap on top of caduceus with two hands shaking out of clouds in the center. In the white bottom-right quadrant, a sun with thirteen rays is shown above a mountain range in the backdrop of a Mesoamerican pyramid. The red bottom-left quadrant features two crossed swords behind a ribbon banner with the year 1982 on it and a hanging key pendant.

The fraternal crest has had six different versions since 1982. The first version was a crudely hand drawn black and white crest that was used in the 1980s. The second version had a different art style and color scheme compared to the contemporary crest, with additional elements such as thirteen sets of knight's armor on the top of the crest and an additional large ribbon banner containing the fraternity's name. The third and fourth versions of Lambda Upsilon Lambda's fraternal crest abandoned the previous art style of the second version to crests more resembling that of the contemporary version. The fifth version of the crest is almost identical to its current version, with the only difference in the latter being that the bottom-left quadrant's ribbon banner featured the fraternity's motto La Unidad Para Siempre on it instead of its founding year.

Lambda Upsilon Lambda's fraternal symbol is the "T-Man" which is featured throughout the iconography of the fraternity. The fraternity has two distinct versions of the fraternal symbol which are utilized throughout the organization, one being the more widely used "T-Man" that is used in official merchandise and a majority of their marketing, and another iteration that is used in paraphernalia by members of the organization and within marketing in a more limited form.

The fraternity's nickname is "Lambdas". Individuals who are initiated are called "Caballeros", a gentlemen or knight in Spanish.

=== Ceremonies ===
In July 2022, the fraternity introduced a new ceremonial ritual called La Despedida to induct deceased members into the honorary Pi Sigma chapter at funerals. The ceremony was created by three members of the organization (Hermano TJ Carrizales of the Alpha chapter, Hermano George Laws Garcia of the Alpha Zeta chapter, and Hermano John Villalobos of the Alpha Epsilon chapter) and features the usage of a red ceremonial armband with a white version of the "T-Man" fraternal symbol, which was created by Hermano Edison Lascano of the Beta chapter.

== Membership ==
Lambda Upsilon Lambda's membership is predominantly Latino and Hispanic American in composition. Members are predominately from the United States, the Caribbean, and Latin America. Members refer to each other as Hermanos (translated as brother in the Spanish language). Those undergoing the new membership education process are referred to as Caballeros (translated as gentlemen or knight in Spanish).

There are three ways to obtain membership within the fraternity: through an undergraduate chapter, through an alumni professional chapter, or receiving honorary status. Undergraduate and alumni professional chapters have separate academic requirements and prerequisites for membership. Honorary membership is decided annually by the organization's legislative group.

Members of the fraternity have access to a variety of different social and professional programs within the organization such LUL Out, which provides a supportive network to Hermanos who identify as members of the LGBTQ+ community, Lambdas Who Roll, which helps promote development opportunities for members to live a more active lifestyle through the martial art of Brazilian jiu-jitsu, and the Lambda Guilds, which are eight professional guilds within the organization that provide resources to Hermanos within different fields.

== Activities ==
The mission of La Unidad Latina, Lambda Upsilon Lambda Fraternity, Inc. is to seek a leadership role in meeting the needs of the Latino community through academic achievement, cultural awareness, community service, and promotion of the Latino culture and people. Specifically, the fraternity seeks to meet this mission through:

- Providing Latino students with the academic, cultural, and social support necessary to excel in institutions of higher learning
- Increasing opportunities for Latino children and adolescents to achieve in elementary and secondary schools
- Developing leaders that shall provide, develop and implement the tools for community empowerment
- Inspiring ethnic pride and cultural awareness in the Latino community
- Supporting the efforts to enhance the growth and well-being of the Latino community
- Collaborating with individuals, organizations, and institutions that will join our efforts to improve the conditions of the Latino community.

=== Philanthropy – P.A.T.H.E ===
The goal of Lambda Upsilon Lambda's philanthropy, The P.A.T.H.E. Initiative (Providing Access To Higher Education), is to support middle school and high school students in their quest to graduate from a four-year college and beyond. The program supports local schools and organizations by mentoring future scholars, facilitating college and university tours, providing P.A.T.H.E. initiative workshops, and advocating for the improvement of the educational system. Through the P.A.T.H.E. initiative, Lambda Upsilon Lambda provides future scholars with the social, educational, and emotional support needed to reach these goals. Nationwide, a portion of the organization's chapters allocate and provide for local scholarships to either current or prospective college students, with much of the fundraising being through fraternity-specific banquets like "Noche de Oro" or collaborative social events like "The Official Four Way: World Tour" with other fraternal Greek-lettered organizations like Alpha Phi Alpha, Iota Nu Delta, and Pi Delta Psi.

=== National performance team ===
The fraternity has two national performance teams called New Age Stroll - Team (NAS-T) and Rated L - National Step Team. They participates in various traditional step and stroll shows such as the annual NALFO showcase and other regional tournaments.

=== La Unidad Latina Foundation ===
The La Unidad Latina Foundation (LULF) was established in 1999 as a platform for a non-profit, charitable organization dedicated to academic excellence and leadership in the Latino community. LULF is a branch of the fraternity and is operated by active alumni members. LULF awards educational scholarships ranging from $200 to $1,000 to Latino/Hispanic undergraduate students that meet moderate requirements.

In May 2012, LULF made news headlines after raising over $125,000 in support of a member of the organization who saw the loss of seven immediate family members in a fatal car accident. The fraternity exceeded its goal of $100,000 and composed the fraternal song "The City of Gold" in honor of the respective Hermano and his family.

=== Dates of celebration ===
- February 19 – Founder's Day
- 2nd Sunday of June – Puerto Rican Day Parade
- September 15 – October 15 - National Hispanic Heritage Month

== Chapters ==
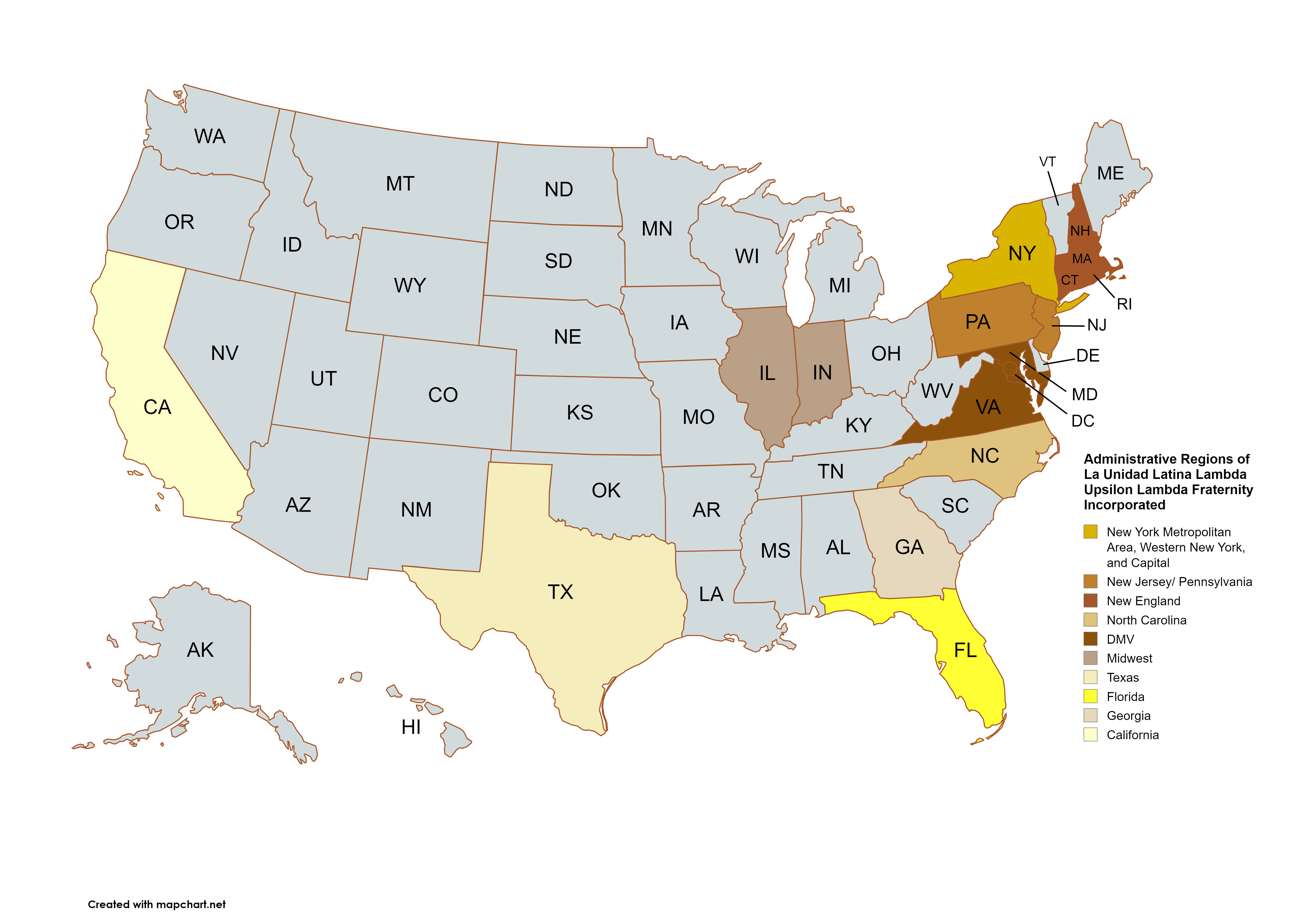
The twelve administrative regions of Lambda Upsilon Lambda Fraternity within the United States.

The fraternity has 85 undergraduate chapters and 19 graduate alumni professional chapters across 119 campuses and various metropolitan areas. Lambda Upsilon Lambda has the honorary Pi Sigma chapter reserved for deceased members of the fraternity.

The chapters are divided nationally into twelve administrative regions across the United States:

- California
- New York Capital District
- DMV
- Florida
- Georgia
- Midwest
- New England
- New Jersey/Pennsylvania
- New York City metropolitan area
- North Carolina
- Texas
- Western New York

== Governance ==
=== National Council and board ===
Lambda Upsilon Lambda has two national governing bodies that oversee different aspects of administration to help it continue to grow throughout the United States. The first is the board of directors which is tasked with alumni development, fund-raising, and strategic planning. It is made up of eleven members, including the National Council president, the chairman of the board, the vice chairman of the board, and eight additional directors.

The second governing body of Lambda Upsilon Lambda is the National Council, which is tasked with overseeing the day-to-day operations of the organization, such as chapter management and expansion. It is made up of sixteen members, including the National Council president, comptroller, three departmental officers, and eleven regional vice presidents.

Additional planning for the organization is also done during conferences held within the fraternity's annual national conventions.

== Notable members ==
=== Traditional ===
- José E. Feliciano - investor, partial owner of Chelsea Football Club, and owner of the San Diego Padres of Major League Baseball
- Fernando Ferrer – borough president of The Bronx from 1987 to 2001
- Eric Gonzalez – Brooklyn District Attorney
- Manuel Natal Albelo – former member of the 29th House of Representatives of Puerto Rico
- Xavier A. Gutierrez - first Latino team president and CEO in the history of the National Hockey League

=== Honorary ===
- Juan Figueroa – Connecticut General Assembly, president of the Puerto Rican Legal Defense and Education Fund
- Jaime Martínez Tolentino – author of various Latin American literary works
- Guillermo Linares – former Democratic member of the New York State Assembly
- Luis A. Miranda Jr. – special advisor for Hispanic Affairs to the New York City Mayor Ed Koch from 1987 to 1989
- Roberto Ramirez – former member of the New York State Assembly
- Piri Thomas – author of the memoir Down These Mean Streets
- Kaleil Isaza Tuzman – former digital media entrepreneur
- Eduardo Peñalver – president of Georgetown University, current president of Seattle University, and 16th dean of Cornell Law School

== See also ==
- List of Latino fraternities and sororities
- List of social fraternities
