= List of Latino fraternities and sororities =

Latino Greek-letter organizations, in the North American student fraternity and sorority system, refer to general or social organizations oriented to students having a special interest in Latino culture and identity. The first known Latino fraternal organization was Alpha Zeta fraternity, established in 1889 at Cornell University.

In 1898, a group of Latin American students at Rensselaer Polytechnic Institute organized the Union Hispano Americana (UHA) as a cultural and intellectual secret society based on the ideology of Pan-Americanism. The UHA eventually became Phi Iota Alpha.

The current rise in Latino Greek organizations began in 1975 and is known as the Latino Greek Movement. This movement called for the equality of Latino people in America, and many Greek letter organizations were developed to create solidarity and political empowerment for the Latino community.

In New Jersey on December 1, 1975, Lambda Theta Phi Latin Fraternity, Inc. was founded at Kean University in Union Township, New Jersey. With the fraternity's second chapter at Rutgers University–New Brunswick in the fall of 1978, Lambda Theta Phi was well on its way to growing the Latino Greek movement. Shortly afterward, a Latina sorority was established at Kean University; Lambda Theta Alpha Latin Sorority, Inc. became the first Latina Greek-lettered organization in the country. These two Greek-lettered organizations empowered the Latino Greek Movement's infancy days and gave the Latino community a voice on campus and in the United States.

On the campus of Rutgers University–Livingston campus, Latino Siempre Unidos or Lambda Sigma Upsilon Latino Fraternity, Inc. formed on April 5, 1979. Corazones Unidos Siempre or Chi Upsilon Sigma National Latin Sorority, Inc. formed at Rutgers University–New Brunswick on April 29, 1980. In 1982, Lambda Upsilon Lambda became the first Latino-based fraternity to be chartered at an Ivy League institution.

There are currently more than 45 Latin-oriented fraternities and sororities, seventeen of which are members of the National Association of Latino Fraternal Organizations (NALFO), an umbrella council of Latino Greek-letter organizations. Six Latino fraternities are affiliated with the North American Interfraternity Conference (NIC). Five Puerto Rican fraternities and two sororities compose the Concilio Interfraternitario de Puerto Rico (CIPR, Puerto Rican Interfraternity Council). The fraternities are also members of the Concilio Interfraternitario Puertorriqueño de la Florida (CIPFI, Puerto Rican Interfraternity Council in Florida).

== Sororities ==
Organization	Symbols	Founding date	Founding location	Affiliation	Status	References
Alpha Beta Sigma	ΑΒΣ	February 1998	State University of New York at Buffalo	Independent	Inactive	
Alpha Pi Sigma	ΑΠΣ	March 10, 1990	San Diego State University	NALFO	Active	
Alpha Sigma Omega	ΑΣΩ	April 26, 1997	Syracuse University	Independent	Active	
Chi Upsilon Sigma	ΧΥΣ	April 29, 1980	Rutgers University	NALFO	Active	
Delta Phi Mu	ΔΦΜ	August 28, 1991	Purdue University	Independent	Active	
Delta Tau Lambda	ΔΤΛ	April 2, 1994	University of Michigan, Ann Arbor	Independent	Active	
Eta Gamma Delta	ΗΓΔ	March 1928	University of Puerto Rico, Río Piedras Campus	CIPR	Active	
Gamma Alpha Omega	ΓΑΩ	January 25, 1993	Arizona State University	Independent	Active	
Gamma Phi Omega	ΓΦΩ	April 17, 1991	Indiana University	NALFO	Active	
Kappa Delta Chi	ΚΔΧ	April 6, 1987	Texas Tech University	NALFO	Active	
Lambda Phi Delta	ΛΦΔ	November 17, 1988	SUNY Buffalo	Independent	Inactive	
Lambda Pi Chi	ΛΠΧ	April 16, 1988	Cornell University	NALFO	Active	
Lambda Pi Upsilon	ΛΠΥ	November 6, 1992	SUNY Geneseo	NALFO	Active	
Lambda Theta Alpha	ΛΘΑ	December 1, 1975	Kean College	Independent	Active	
Lambda Theta Nu	ΛΘΝ	March 11, 1986	California State University, Chico	NALFO	Active	
Malika Kambe Umfazi	MKU	June 16, 1995	SUNY Buffalo	Independent	Active	(Note: This group defines itself as Afro-Latino.)
Mu Alpha Phi	ΜΑΦ	October 24, 1927	University of Puerto Rico, Río Piedras Campus	CIPR	Active	
Mu Iota Upsilon	ΜΙΥ	May 2, 1999	State University of New York at Delhi	Independent	Active	
Omega Phi Beta	ΩΦΒ	March 15, 1989	SUNY Albany	NALFO	Active	
Omega Pi Lambda	ΩΠΛ	March 14, 2023	University of Wisconsin–Whitewater	Independent	Active	
Phi Beta Mex		1933	College of Mines and Metallurgy of the University of Texas (now University of Texas at El Paso)	Independent	Inactive	
Phi Chi Delta	ΦΧΔ	January 27, 1913	Louisiana State University	Independent	Inactive	
Phi Delta Psi Eta	ΦΔΨΗ	July 23, 1992	Pennsylvania State University - University Park	Independent	Inactive	
Phi Lambda Rho	ΦΛΡ	November 13, 1993	California State University, Stanislaus	Independent	Active	
Pi Lambda Chi	ΠΛΧ	March 5, 1994	University of Colorado at Boulder	Independent	Active	
Quetzal	QZ		Sonoma State University	Independent	Inactive	
Sigma Alpha Chi	ΣΑΧ	April 15, 1997	Missouri State University	Independent	Inactive	
Sigma Delta	ΣΔ	April 12, 1996	Rensselaer Polytechnic Institute	Independent	Inactive	
Sigma Delta Lambda	ΣΔΛ	September 26, 1996	Texas State University–San Marcos	Independent	Active	
Sigma Iota Alpha	ΣΙΑ	September 29, 1990	SUNY Albany, SUNY Stony Brook, SUNY New Paltz and Rensselaer Polytechnic Institute	NALFO	Active	
Sigma Lambda Alpha	ΣΛΑ	October 5, 1992	Texas Woman's University	Independent	Active	
Sigma Lambda Upsilon	ΣΛΥ	December 1, 1987	Binghamton University	NALFO	Active	
Sigma Omega Nu	ΣΩΝ	November 6, 1996	California Polytechnic State University - San Luis Obispo	NALFO	Active	
Sigma Pi Alpha	ΣΠΑ	May 2, 1996	University of California, Berkeley	Independent	Active	

== Fraternities ==
Organization	Symbols	Founding date	Founding location	Affiliation	Status	References
Alpha Beta Chi	ΑΒΧ	1941	University of Puerto Rico, Río Piedras Campus	CIPR, CIPFI	Active	
Alpha Zeta	ΑΖ	January 1, 1890	Cornell University	Independent	Inactive	
Delta Pi Rho	ΔΠΡ	December 9, 2004	Purdue University	Independent	Active	
Gamma Iota Omicron	ΓΙΟ	February 7, 2006	Washington State University	Independent	Active	
Gamma Zeta Alpha	ΓΖΑ	December 3, 1987	California State University, Chico	NALFO	Active	
La Hermandad de o eMe Te	OMT	January 21, 1996	Washington State University	Independent	Active	(Note: The fraternity's name is in Aztec letters, rather than Greek.)
Lambda Alpha Upsilon	ΛΑΥ	December 10, 1985	SUNY Buffalo	NALFO	Active	
Lambda Kappa Kappa	ΛΚΚ	December 13, 1994	Texas Wesleyan University	Independent	Inactive	
Lambda Sigma Alpha	ΛΣΑ	1926	University of Arizona	Independent	Inactive	
Lambda Sigma Upsilon (Chapters)	ΛΣΥ	April 5, 1979	Rutgers University - New Brunswick	NALFO, NIC	Active	
Lambda Theta Phi (Chapters)	ΛΘΦ	December 1, 1975	Kean College	NIC	Active	
Lambda Upsilon Lambda (Chapters)	ΛΥΛ	February 19, 1982	Cornell University	NALFO	Active	
L.I.U.N. (Phi Chi Delta)		February 9, 1909	Louisiana State University	Independent	Inactive	
Nu Alpha Kappa	ΝΑΚ	February 26, 1988	California Polytechnic State University - San Luis Obispo	NIC	Active	
Nu Sigma Beta	ΝΣΒ	October 1937	University of Puerto Rico, Río Piedras Campus	CIPR, CIPFI	Active	
Omega Delta Phi (Chapters)	ΩΔΦ	November 25, 1987	Texas Tech University	NIC	Active	
Phi Delta Gamma	ΦΔΓ	April 25, 1942	University of Puerto Rico at Mayagüez	CIPR, CIPFI	Active	
Phi Eta Mu	ΦΗΜ	1923	University of Puerto Rico, Río Piedras Campus	CIPR, CIPFI	Active	
Phi Iota Alpha (Chapters)	ΦΙΑ	December 26, 1931	Rensselaer Polytechnic Institute	NALFO, NIC	Active	
Phi Lambda Alpha	ΦΛΑ	1919	University of California, Berkeley	Independent	Inactive	(Note: Merged in 1921 to form Phi Lambda Alpha.) (Note: Merged in 1931 to form Phi Iota Alpha.)
Phi Sigma Alpha	ΦΣΑ	October 22, 1928	University of Puerto Rico, Río Piedras Campus	CIPR, CIPFI	Active	
Pi Delta Phi	ΠΔΦ	1916	Massachusetts Institute of Technology	Independent	Inactive	
Psi Alpha Kappa	ΨΑΚ	October 1, 1900	Lehigh University	Independent	Inactive	
Sigma Delta Alpha	ΣΔΑ	May 5, 1992	San Jose State University	Independent	Active	
Sigma Delta Alpha (PR)	ΣΔΑ	October 22, 1928	University of Puerto Rico	Independent	Inactive	(Note: Merged in 1934 with the Alpha Boriquen Militant chapter of Phi Iota Alpha to become Phi Sigma Alpha.)
Sigma Iota	ΣΙ	March 12, 1912	Louisiana State University	Independent	Inactive	
Sigma Iota Alpha (fraternity)	ΣΙΑ	April 1939	Louisiana State University	Independent	Inactive	(Note: Founded by two disaffiliated members of Phi Iota Alpha and 18 others in April 1939. Merged with Phi Sigma Alpha on September 10, 1939, to become one of two administrative zones of the Sigma Fraternity. It then went on to rename itself as Phi Sigma Beta and then eventually renamed itself once more to just be Phi Sigma Alpha)
Sigma Lambda Beta (Chapters)	ΣΛΒ	April 4, 1986	University of Iowa	NIC	Active	
Sigma Phi Rho	ΣΦΡ	November 13, 1979	Wagner College	Independent	Active	(Note: This is an Afro-Latino fraternity.)
Xi Theta Psi	ΞΘΨ	March 5, 1995	Utica University	Independent	Active	

== Coed organizations ==
Organization	Symbols	Founding date	Founding location	Affiliation	Status	References
Alpha Psi Lambda	ΑΨΛ	February 11, 1985	Ohio State University	NALFO	Active	
Delta Sigma Chi	ΔΣΧ	August 31, 1987	California State University, Long Beach	Independent	Active	

== See also ==
- College fraternities and sororities
- Cultural interest fraternities and sororities
- List of fraternities and sororities in Puerto Rico
- List of social fraternities
- List of social sororities and women's fraternities
- Racism in Greek life
