= Sigma Omega Nu =

Americal Latina-interest collegiate sorority

- ΣΏΝ
- Coat of Arms of Sigma Omega Nu
- Founded: November 6, 1996; 29 years ago California Polytechnic State University, San Luis Obispo
- Type: Social
- Affiliation: NALFO
- Status: Active
- Emphasis: Latina-interest
- Scope: Regional
- Pillars: Academics, Cultura, and Sisterhood
- Colors: Black, Burgundy and Gold
- Symbol: Sun
- Flower: White and yellow roses
- Chapters: 16 active
- Members: 1,300 lifetime
- Nickname: Sunnies, SON
- Headquarters: , California; United States
- Website: www.officialsigmaomeganu.org

Sigma Omega Nu Latina Interest Sorority Inc. (ΣΏΝ) is an American collegiate sorority for Latina women. It was formed at California Polytechnic State University, San Luis Obispo in 1996. Other chapters have been established in California, Colorado, and Nevada. It is a member of the National Association of Latino Fraternal Organizations.

== History ==
Sigma Omega Nu was formed at California Polytechnic State University, San Luis Obispo on November 6, 1996. It is Latina-interest social sorority, created to give Latinas a voice on campus. Its eight founders were Zulema Gonzalez, Landi Hueramo, Yesenia Hueramo, Lina Medina, Nadia Quinoñez, Nancy Ruiz, Cristina de Sanchez, and Sarai Sequeria.

A second chapter was chartered at California State University, Sacramento in 2000. Other chapters were established in California, Colorado, and Nevada.

Sorority members participate in community service activities such as raising money for breast cancer awareness, a local women's shelter, and the Women & Children's Clinic at Saint John's Health Centerl. In 2018, the Alpha chapter at California Polytechnic State University, San Luis Obispo joined other student organizations in boycotting the university's open house in solidarity of minority students and in protest of a photograph of a campus fraternity's member wearing blackface.

As of 2024, Sigma Omega Nu has initiated 1,300 members. Although a Latina-interest sorority, it accepts members of all cultures, ethnicities, and sexual orientations. It is a member of the National Association of Latino Fraternal Organizations.

== Symbols ==
Sigma Omega Nu's objectives or pillars are Academics, Cultura, and Sisterhood. The sorority's colors are black, burgundy, and gold. Its symbol is the sun. Its flowers are white and yellow roses. Its nicknames are Sunnies and SON.

== Chapters ==
Following is a list of Sigma Omega Nu chapters, with active chapters indicated in bold and inactive chapters and institutions in italics.

Chapter	Charter date and range	Institution	Location	Status	Ref.
**Founding**	November 6, 1996	California Polytechnic State University, San Luis Obispo	San Luis Obispo, California	Active	
**Beta**	July 22, 2000	California State University, Sacramento	Sacramento, California	Active	
**Gamma**	March 22, 2002	University of California, Santa Barbara	Santa Barbara, California	Active	
**Delta**	October 5, 2002	Woodbury University	Burbank, California	Active	
**Epsilon**	May 7, 2005	California State University, Fresno	Fresno, California	Active	
**Zeta**	April 28, 2007	Santa Clara University	Santa Clara, California	Active	
**Eta**	October 13, 2007	California State University, Northridge	Los Angeles, California	Active	
**Theta**	May 17, 2008	California State University, Monterey Bay	Monterey County, California	Active	
**Iota**	May 30, 2010	University of Nevada, Reno	Reno, Nevada	Active	
**Kappa**	November 14, 2010	University of California, Davis	Davis, California	Active	
**Lambda**	July 23, 2011	University of Nevada, Las Vegas	Paradise, Nevada	Active	
**Mu**	April 22, 2012	Sonoma State University	Rohnert Park, California	Active	
Nu	May 8, 2013 – August 2015	National Hispanic University	San Jose, California	Inactive	(Note: The university closed on August 23, 2015.)
**Xi**	November 16, 2018	California State University, East Bay	Hayward, California	Active	
**Omicron**	November 18, 2018	San Francisco State University	San Francisco, California	Active	
**Pi**	March 29, 2019	California State University Channel Islands	Camarillo, California	Active	
Rho	May 4, 2020	Colorado State University	Fort Collins, Colorado	Inactive	(Note: Chapter lost its university recognition in spring 2023 due to its "egregious hazing behavior".)
**Omega**				Memorial	

== See also ==
- Cultural interest fraternities and sororities
- List of Latino fraternities and sororities
- List of social sororiies and women's fraternities
