= Sigma Pi Alpha =

American Latina collegiate sorority

- ΣΠΑ
- Founded: May 2, 1996; 30 years ago University of California, Berkeley
- Type: Social
- Affiliation: Independent
- Status: Active
- Emphasis: Latina
- Scope: Regional
- Motto: Mujeres Con Cultura, Fuerza y Hermandad
- Pillars: Community Service, Campus Involvement, Culture, Academics, Sisterhood
- Colors: Midnight Green, Pearl, Onyx, and Shimmering Gold
- Flower: Calla Lily
- Mascot: Golden Bear
- Philanthropy: Breast cancer awareness
- Chapters: 12 active
- Nickname: ELLAs, Sigmas
- Headquarters: , California; United States
- Website: www.sigmapialpha.org

Sigma Pi Alpha Sorority, Inc. (ΣΠΑ) is a Chicana and Latina-based, Greek letter, intercollegiate sorority founded in 1996 at the University of California, Berkeley. Although Sigma Pi Alpha is a Chicana Latina organization by tradition, membership is open to all college women. It has established thirteen chapters in California.

== History ==
Sigma Pi Alpha was established on May 2, 1996, at the University of California, Berkeley, and has expanded to other locations in California. It founders were nine Chicana and Latina female students who wanted to create a network for Latinas and make an impact in Chicana and Latina communities. The founders were Michelle Amezcua, Lisa Carlsen, Karina Jacobo, Karina Lleva, Yovanna Monia Ochoa, Erica Quintor, Leonor Maria de los Angeles Ocon Chavez Rodriguez Sierra, Elizabeth Naty Santana Lepe, and Teresa Torres.

In 2001, Beta chapter was established at the University of California, Riverside, followed by Gamma at the University of California, Santa Cruz in 2002. In 2003, chapters were chartered at the San Francisco State University, California State University, San Bernardino, University of California, Davis. By 2016, Sigma Pi Alpha had chartered thirteen chapters within the California state university system. Although Sigma Pi Alpha is a Chicana Latina organization by tradition, it considers itself to be multicultural and its membership is open to all college women.

== Symbols ==
The sorority's Greek letters ΣΠΑ were selected to symbolize their Chicana and Latina heritage by spelling ELLA, meaning "she" and "her" in the Spanish language.

The sorority's motto is Mujeres Con Cultura, Fuerza y Hermandad. Its pillars are "Community Service, Campus Involvement, Culture, Academics, and Sisterhood. Its colors are midnight green, pearl, onyx, and shimmering gold. Its flower is the calla lily and its mascot is the golden bear. The sorority's nicknames are ELLAs and Sigmas.

== Activities ==
Sigma Pi Alpha promotes cultural education with cultural events, lectures, and workshops. Its national philanthropy is breast cancer awareness, raising funds for the American Cancer Society and the Susan G. Komen Foundation. Members also participate in community service on Cesar Chavez Day.

The Sigma Pi Alpha Sorority, Inc. Alum Association provides a post-graduation social and professional networks. One of the Alum Association's activities is the Ella Puede mentorship program.

== Governance ==
The sorority is governed by a national council. Its officers include president, vice president, director of finance, director of administration relations, director of academic affairs, director of constitutional records, director of expansion relations, director of philanthropy, director of public relations, and director of sorority ethics.

The sorority is not part of the Greek Panhellenic System and does not affiliate with any national fraternity or sorority council. However, its chapters may participation the Multicultural Greek Council at the campus level.

== Chapters ==
Chapters are present at the following institutions, with active chapters indicated in bold and inactive chapters in italics.

Chapter	Charter date and range	Institution	Location	Status	Ref.
**Alpha**	May 2, 1996	University of California, Berkeley	Berkeley, California	Active	
**Beta**	June 2001	University of California, Riverside	Riverside, California	Active	
**Gamma**	2002	University of California, Santa Cruz	Santa Cruz, California	Active	
**Delta**	2003	San Francisco State University	San Francisco, California	Active	
**Epsilon**	2003	California State University, San Bernardino	San Bernardina, California	Active	
**Zeta**	2003	University of California, Davis	Davis, California	Active	
**Eta**	2004	California State University, Sacramento	Sacramento, California	Active	
**Theta**	2005	Sonoma State University	Rohnert Park, California	Active	
**Iota**	2007	University of California, San Diego	San Diego, California	Active	
**Kappa**	2008	California State University, Los Angeles	Los Angeles, California	Active	
**Lambda**	2010	San Jose State University	San Jose, California	Active	
Mu	2016–202x ?	California State Polytechnic University, Humboldt	Arcadia, California	Inactive	
**Nu**	2016	University of California, Irvine	Irvine, California	Active	
**Sigma**	2003	Eternal chapter		Memorial	

== See also ==
- Cultural interest fraternities and sororities
- List of social sororities and women's fraternities
