= Delta Tau Lambda =

American Latina sorority

- ΔΤΛ
- Founded: April 2, 1994; 32 years ago University of Michigan
- Type: Social
- Affiliation: Independent
- Status: Active
- Emphasis: Cultural interest - Latinas
- Scope: National
- Motto: Con Fuerza Construiremos, Con Honestidad Creceremos, Con Unidad Nunca Seremos Vencidas "Strength and Unity are the Key to Excellence"
- Pillars: Strength, Honesty, Excellence, Integrity, Unity, and Wisdom
- Colors: Brown, Gold, and Cream
- Symbol: African Lion
- Flower: Forget-Me-Not
- Jewel: Diamond
- Chapters: 14 collegiate, 10 graduate professional
- Nickname: DTL
- Headquarters: P.O. Box 7714; Ann Arbor, Michigan 48107-7714; United States
- Website: www.deltataulambda.org

Delta Tau Lambda Sorority, Inc. (ΔΤΛ) is a collegiate and graduate Latina-based, multicultural Greek-lettered sorority. It was founded on April 2, 1994, at the University of Michigan by Darilís García and Maria Victoria Ramos. The sorority has chartered fourteen collegiate and ten graduate professional chapters in the United States.

== History ==
Delta Tau Lambda Sorority, Inc. was founded by Darilís García and Maria Victoria Ramos at the University of Michigan on April 2, 1994. Its goals are to focus on community service, promote higher learning in Latino youth, convey in younger woman through their wisdom to reach for their dreams using education as their tool, promote unity in the Latino community by identifying common problems, supporting each other, and defining collective solutions, and expand their cultural horizon by working with other communities of color. In the fall of 1994, DTL hosted the first Salute to Latinas: Fuerza de la Mujer Latina, which has become their annual, signature event.

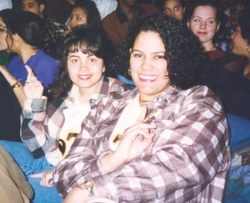
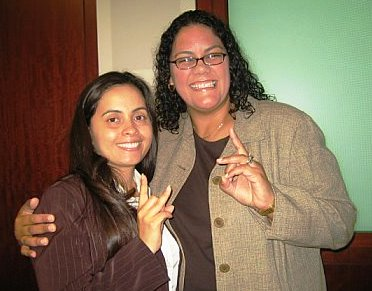
Founders: Maria Victoria Ramos and Darilis Garcia-McMillian

In 2003, the first graduate chapter, Alpha Lambda, was created in the Detroit Metropolitan area. The sorority has continued to add both collegiate and graduate chapters since its founding and now has a nationwide presence.

== Symbols ==
Delta Tau Lambda's motto is Con Fuerza Construiremos, Con Honestidad Creceremos, Con Unidad Nunca Seremos Vencidas or Strength and Unity are the Key to Excellence. Its principles or pillars are Strength, Honesty, Excellence, Integrity, Unity, Wisdom.

The sorority's colors are brown and gold, always accented in cream Its symbol is the African lion Its flower is the forget-me-not Its stone is the diamond

== Membership ==
Membership to Delta Tau Lambda Sorority, Inc. can be earned regardless of race, ethnicity, creed, sexual orientation, ability, or national origin.

== Philanthropy ==
Undergraduate, graduate and professional members engage in community service projects and fundraising for their charitable causes; Breast Cancer, Diabetes, HIV/AIDS, and Mental Health. Many projects focus on the Latina/Latino community, as each of these causes disproportionately affect people of color.

Delta Tau Lambda Sorority, Inc. established the Lydia Cruz & Sandra Maria Ramos Scholarship in March 1995. The scholarship is named after Darilís García's grandmother and Maria Victoria Ramos' sister. It is awarded annually to a Woman of Color who is either a graduating high school senior that will be attending a two or four-year higher learning institution or a first-year student at a two or four-year higher learning institution.

== Chapters ==
=== Collegiate ===
The following is a list of Delta Tau Lambda Sorority, Inc. collegiate chapters. Active chapters are indicated in bold and inactive chapters are in italics.

Chapter	Charter date and range	Institution	Location	Status	Ref.
**Alpha**	1994	University of Michigan	Ann Arbor, Michigan	Active	
Beta	1999	Roosevelt University	Chicago, Illinois	Inactive	
Gamma		Montgomery, Alabama	Montgomery, Alabama	Inactive	
Delta		University of Texas at El Paso	El Paso, Texas	Inactive	
**Epsilon**	2007	University of South Florida	Tampa, Florida	Active	
Zeta	2007–after fall 2021	Texas A&M University	College Station, Texas	Inactive	
**Eta**	2008	Michigan State University	East Lansing, Michigan	Active	
Theta	2008	Wayne State University	Detroit, Michigan	Inactive	
Iota	2009	University of Nevada, Las Vegas	Las Vegas, Nevada	Inactive	
**Kappa**	2010	Northeastern Illinois University	Chicago, Illinois	Active	
**Lambda**	2014	Grand Valley State University	Allendale, Michigan	Active	
Mu	2014–c. 2019	Marygrove College	Detroit, Michigan	Inactive	(Note: Marygrove College closed in December 2019.)
Nu	2014–c. 2015	University of Texas–Pan American	Edinburg, Texas	Inactive	(Note: UTPA ceased operations on August 31, 2015, and was replaced by the newly formed University of Texas Rio Grande Valley.)
**Xi**	2017	Western Michigan University	Kalamazoo, Michigan	Active	

=== Graduate professional ===
Following is a list of Delta Tau Lambda graduate professional chapters. Active chapters are indicated in bold and inactive chapters are in italics.

Chapter	Charter date and range	Location	City	Status	Ref.
**Alpha Lambda**	2003	Detroit Metropolitan	Detroit, Michigan	Active	
**Beta Lambda**		El Paso Metropolitan	El Paso, Texas	Active	
**Gamma Lambda**		Chicago Metropolitan	Chicago, Illinois	Active	
**Delta Lambda**		Portland Metropolitan	Portland, Oregon	Active	
**Epsilon Lambda**		Tampa Metropolitan	Tampa, Florida	Active	
**Zeta Lambda**		California Bay Area	San Francisco, California	Active	
**Eta Lambda**		Seattle/Tacoma Metropolitan	Tacoma, Washington	Active	
**Eta Lambda**		Seattle/Tacoma Metropolitan	Seattle, Washington	Active	
Theta Lambda		Rio Grande Valley	Texas	Inactive	
**Iota Lambda**		Greater Lansing	Lansing, Michigan	Active	
**Kappa Lambda**		South Miami	South Miami, Florida	Active	

== See also ==
- Cultural interest fraternities and sororities
