= Alpha Omicron Sigma =

Puerto Rican fraternity

- ΑŌΣ
- Founded: April 1, 1957; 69 years ago Pontifical Catholic University of Puerto Rico
- Type: Social
- Affiliation: Independent
- Status: Active
- Scope: National (PR)
- Motto: Igualdad, Justicia y Fraternidad
- Colors: Yellow, White, and Purple
- Chapters: 9
- Nickname: Omicrones
- Headquarters: Ponce; Puerto Rico
- Website: https://alphaomicronsigma.com/

Alpha Omicron Sigma (ΑŌΣ) is a Puerto Rican fraternity established in 1957.

== History ==
Alpha Omicron Sigma fraternity was established during August and September of the year 1956 and was initially called Alpha Phriggia Sigma, through the efforts of a group of young students from the Pontifical Catholic University of Puerto Rico in Ponce, who were aware of a fraternity where the principles of equality, justice and fraternity were practiced to capacity. It was on April 1, 1957, when it was officially incorporated as a non-profit corporation by being registered in the Registry of Corporations and Entities of Puerto Rico.

== Symbols ==
The fraternity's colors are yellow, white, and purple. Its motto is Igualdad, Justicia y Fraternidad. Its nickname is Omicrones.

== Philanthropy ==
The fraternity participates in charitable activities such as Rapados por una Causa II (Shaved for a cause II) for the Cabezitas Rapadas Foundation which assists economically and emotionally cancer patients in radio and chemotherapy. It has also collected of shoes for people with needs for the charity organization Soles4Souls Capítulo de Puerto Rico. After the 2010 Haiti earthquake, the fraternity collected essential items to be donated to those affected by the earthquake.

== Chapters ==
Following is a list of Apha Omicron Sigma chapters.

Chapter	Charter date	Institution	Location	Status	Ref.
Alpha	April 1, 1957	Pontifical Catholic University of Puerto Rico	Ponce, Puerto Rico		
Beta	November 1958	University of Puerto Rico, Río Piedras Campus	Río Piedras, Puerto Rico		
Gamma	March 1959	University of Puerto Rico, Mayagüez Campus	Mayagüez, Puerto Rico	Active	
Delta	1960	Inter American University of Puerto Rico, Arecibo Campus	Arecibo, Puerto Rico		
Epsilon	1961	Inter American University of Puerto Rico, San German Campus	San Germán, Puerto Rico		
Zeta	November 1990	Inter American University of Puerto Rico, Aguadilla Campus	Aguadilla, Puerto Rico		
Eta	1991	University of Puerto Rico at Humacao	Humacao, Puerto Rico		
Kappa	2009	University of Puerto Rico at Cayey	Cayey, Puerto Rico		
Omega	1980	University of Puerto Rico at Utuado	Utuado, Puerto Rico		

=== Passive Zones ===
Chapter	Location	Status	Ref.
Zona Pasiva Norte	Arecibo, Puerto Rico	Active	
Zona Pasiva Sur	Ponce, Puerto Rico		
Zona Pasiva Otoao	Utuado, Puerto Rico	Active	
Zona Pasiva Metro	San Juan, Puerto Rico	Active	
Zona Edgardo José Cartagena	Guayama, Puerto Rico		
Zona Pasiva Kappa	Cayey, Puerto Rico		

== See also ==
- Puerto Rican fraternities and sororities
