= Sigma Delta Alpha =

American collegiate Latino-based fraternity

- ΣΔΑ
- Founded: May 5, 1992; 34 years ago San Jose State University
- Type: Social
- Affiliation: Independent
- Former affiliation: NALFO
- Status: Active
- Emphasis: Latino Interest
- Scope: National
- Motto: Excelencia Y Lealtad Entre Hermanos "Excellence and Loyalty Amongst Brothers"
- Colors: Forest Green, White, and Maroon
- Chapters: 12 collegiate and 3 alumni
- Nickname: Sigmas
- Headquarters: San Jose, California; United States
- Website: sigmadeltaalpha.com

Sigma Delta Alpha (ΣΔΑ) is a Greek-lettered Latino-based fraternity established in spring 1992 at San José State University.

== History ==
The first interest group was formed in the Fall semester of 1991, at San Jose State University. Future Founding Father, Francisco Huerta, had the idea of creating a new organization on campus to serve the needs of Latinos. Francisco Huerta took the forefront in organizing the initial meetings that set the groundwork for the establishment of Sigma Delta Alpha.

The first introductory meeting held in November 1991. The fraternity's ideological Purposes were set and after several meetings and numerous successful events it was decided that it was time for these individuals to present themselves to the community as an established organization. On May 5, 1992, Sigma Delta Alpha was officially recognized with 18 Founding Fathers.

This was one of only two Latino fraternities founded in the United States during the so-called fragmentation period from 1990 to 2000, and the third to ever be founded in California.

It is also one of the few Latino fraternities that eschew stepping, an important distinction when considering the cultural history of the practice.

== Symbols ==
Sigma Delta Alpha's motto is Excelencia Y Lealtad Entre Hermanos or "Excellence and Loyalty Amongst Brothers". Its colors are forest green, white, and maroon. Its nickname is Sigmas.

== Chapters ==
Following are the chapters of Sigma Delta Alpha. Active chapters are indicated in bold. Inactive chapters are in italics.

Chapter	Charter date and range	Institution	City	State	Status	Ref.
Founding	May 5, 1992	San Jose State University	San Jose	California	Inactive	
**Alpha**	April 22, 1995	University of Southern California	Los Angeles	California	Active	
Beta	May 14, 1998	California State University, Fresno	Fresno	California	Inactive	
**Gamma**	September 16, 2001	University of Nevada, Las Vegas	Las Vegas	Nevada	Active	
**Delta**	April 6, 2002	California State University, Sacramento	Sacramento	California	Active	
Epsilon	September 21, 2002	University of California, Irvine	Irvine	California	Inactive	
**Zeta**	March 18, 2006	California State University, Fullerton	Fullerton	California	Active	
Eta	August 20, 2010	University of California, Riverside	Riverside	California	Inactive	
Theta	May 5, 2012	University of California, Merced	Merced	California	Inactive	
Iota	August 8, 2014	University of California, Davis	Davis	California	Inactive	
Kappa	April 30, 2016	University of California, Santa Barbara	Santa Barbara	California	Inactive	
**Lambda**	June 2, 2017	California State Polytechnic University, Pomona	Pomona	California	Active	

== Notable members ==
- Mark Cardenas, Arizona House of Representatives
- Oscar De Los Santos, Arizona House of Representatives

== See also ==
- Cultural interest fraternities and sororities
- List of social fraternities and sororities
