= Zeta Phi Beta (fraternity) =

Puerto Rican fraternity

- ΖΦΒ
- Founded: November 21, 1957; 68 years ago University of Puerto Rico at Mayagüez
- Type: Social
- Affiliation: Independent
- Status: Active
- Scope: International
- Motto: Honor et Fraternitas
- Colors: Green and Gold
- Chapters: 12
- Members: 3,000+ lifetime
- Nickname: Los Zetas
- Headquarters: Mayagüez, Puerto Rico; United States
- Website: abimaelpadilla0905.wixsite.com/zetaphibeta

Zeta Phi Beta Fraternity (ΖΦΒ) is a Puerto Rican college fraternity. It was established in 1957 at the University of Puerto Rico at Mayagüez. The fraternity has established twelve chapters in Puerto Rico and the Dominican Republic.

== History ==
Zeta Phi Beta was founded on November 21, 1957, at the University of Puerto Rico at Mayagüez by seven students from diverse backgrounds. Its founding members were Luís Antonio Oliveras Arroyo, Luís Manuel Carrillo Jr., Oscar Fermaint Giboyeaux, Juan Antonio Martínez, Pedro J. Narváez Negron, Orlando Clavell Pumarejo, and Eladio Rivera Rodríguez.

As of 2016, the fraternity has over 3,000 members and eleven chapters at the university level, including two chapters in the Dominican Republic. Its headquarters is in Mayagüez, Puerto Rico.

== Symbols ==
The motto of Zeta Phi Beta is Honor et Fraternitas. The fraternity's colors are green and gold. Its nickname is Los Zetas.

== Chapters ==
=== University chapters ===
In the following list, active chapters are indicated in bold and inactive chapters are in italics.

Chapter	Charter date and range	Institution	Location	Status	Ref.
**Alpha**	1957	University of Puerto Rico at Mayagüez	Mayagüez, Puerto Rico	Active	
Beta (First)	1958	University of Puerto Rico-Rio Piedras Campus	San Juan, Puerto Rico	Moved	
**Beta**		University of Puerto Rico at Bayamón	Bayamón, Puerto Rico	Active	
**Gamma**	1958	Interamerican University of Puerto Rico	San Germán, Puerto Rico	Active	
**Epsilon**	1960	Interamerican University of Puerto Rico	Arecibo, Puerto Rico	Active	
**Delta**	1963	Pontifical Catholic University of Puerto Rico	Ponce, Puerto Rico	Active	
**Eta**	1962	Interamerican University of Puerto Rico, Hato Rey Campus	Hato Rey, Puero Rico	Active	
**Lambda**	2008	Universidad Central del Este	San Pedro de Macorís, Dominican Republic	Active	
**Omicron**	1968	Pedro Henríquez Ureña National University	Santo Domingo, Dominican Republic	Active	
**Sigma**	1965	Interamerican University of Puerto Rico, Ponce Campus	Ponce, Puerto Rico	Active	
**Tau**	1997	University of Puerto Rico at Utuado	Utuado, Puerto Rico	Active	
**Omega**	1984	Polytechnic University of Puerto Rico, Hato Rey Campus	Hato Rey, Puerto Rico	Active	
**Chi**	2015		Yauco, Puerto Rico	Active	

=== Zones ===
Following are the Zeta Phi Beta zones or community-based chapters.

Zone	Charter date and range	Location	Status	Ref.
Arecibo Zone	1966	Arecibo, Puerto Rico	Active	
West Zone(Jose "Huchy" Soto)	1969	Puerto Rico	Active	
San Jan Area	1970	San Juan, Puerto Rico	Active	
Ponce Area	1971	Ponce, Puerto Rico	Active	
Rio Grande Area	1971	Rio Grand, Puerto Rico	Active	
Carolina Zone	1971	Carolina, Puerto Rico	Active	
Bayamon Area	1971	Bayamon, Puerto Rico	Active	
Santo Domngo Area	1982	Santo Domingo, Dominican Republic	Active	
Southwest Zone (Confesor Rivera)	2014		Active	
