= Lambda Sigma Upsilon =

American Latino collegiate fraternity

- ΛΣΥ
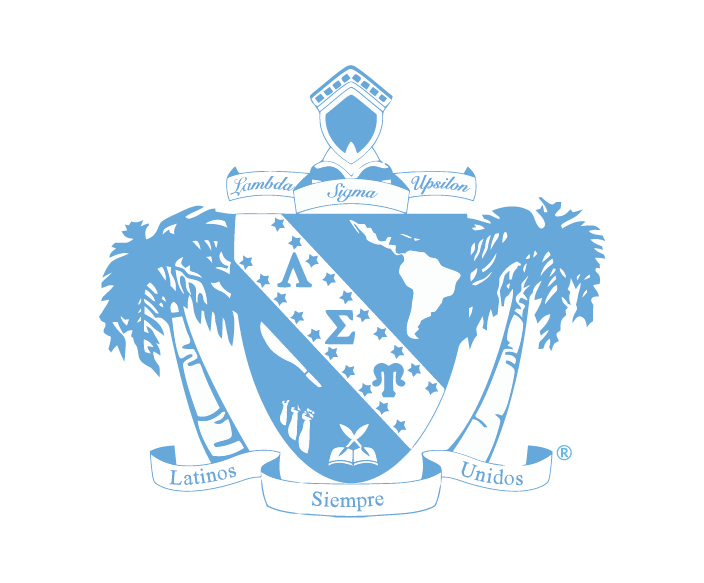
- Founded: April 5, 1979; 47 years ago Rutgers University–New Brunswick Livingston Campus
- Type: Social
- Affiliation: NALFO; NIC
- Status: Active
- Emphasis: Cultural - Latinos
- Scope: National
- Motto: Latinos Siempre Unidos "Latinos Always United"
- Colors: Baby Blue and White
- Symbol: Taino Indian
- Philanthropy: HIV/AIDS research and awareness
- Chapters: 55 active undergraduate 2 graduate/professional 5 alumni associations
- Nickname: LSU, Upsilons
- Headquarters: 344 Grove Street, Unit #1279; Jersey City, New Jersey 07302; United States
- Website: www.lsu79.org

Lambda Sigma Upsilon, Latino Fraternity, Inc. (ΛΣΥ) is an American intercollegiate Latino oriented Greek lettered fraternity. It was founded in 1979 at Rutgers University–New Brunswick Livingston Campus in Middlesex County, New Jersey. Lambda Sigma Upsilon has chartered 88 undergraduate chapters, two graduate/professional chapters, and five alumni associations. The fraternity is a member of the North American Interfraternity Conference (NIC) and a member of the National Association of Latino Fraternal Organizations (NALFO). It is the brother organization of Mu Sigma Upsilon, a multicultural-based sorority.

== History ==
In the mid to late 1970s, protests and acts of civil disobedience became commonplace at Rutgers University–New Brunswick as students asserted their disappointment with university, professors' tenure, national issues, and Latino student rights. In the spring of 1979, a group of students at the Livingston Campus in Middlesex County suggested the creation of a Latino social fellowship. After meeting regularly, they officially established the Latinos Siempre Unidos Latino Social Fellowship (LSU) on April 5, 1979.

The fellowship's twenty founders were men who believed that underrepresented groups, particularly ethnic minorities, at colleges and universities were not getting the attention or services needed to advance their academic successes. They created Latinos Siempre Unidos to act as a support group for these groups, as well as to provide a family away from home. The founders developed four goals of academic excellence, cultural awareness and diversity, being role models to the community, and brotherhood.

Initially, the fellowship expanded to other campuses in New Jersey. A second chapter was established at William Paterson University in 1982, followed by chapters at Stockton University in 1983 and Montclair State University in 1984. In the fall of 1987, the organization adopted the Greek letters of Lambda Sigma Upsilon and transitioned from a Latino social fellowship to a fraternity in order to gain recognition and access to rights, resources, and participation within the collegiate Greek system that were unavailable to fellowships on different campuses.

In 1995, the fraternity chartered its first chapter outside of New Jersey at Bloomsburg University of Pennsylvania.

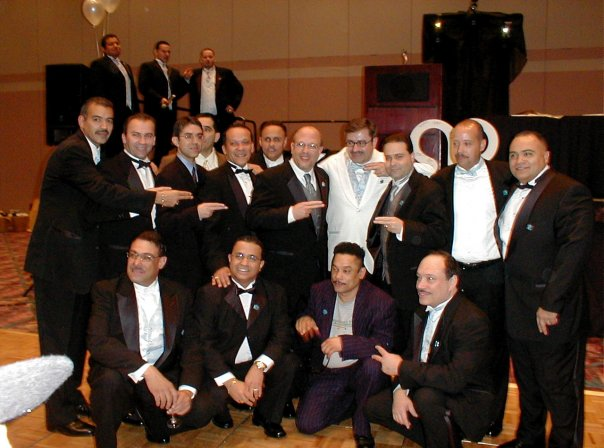
15 of the 20 founding fathers of Lambda Sigma Upsilon.

Lambda Sigma Upsilon has been touted as being a "catalyst for change, and a vehicle for pertinent conversation regarding relevant issues between student and the university administration". It is a Member of the National Greek council North American Interfraternity Conference (NIC) and the National Association of Latino Fraternal Organizations (NALFO). Its national headquarters are at 344 Grove Street in Jersey City, New Jersey.

== Symbols ==
The fraternity's Greek letters were selected from its motto of Latinos Siempre Unidos or "Latinos Always United". Its colors are baby blue and white, symbolizing unity, clarity, and purpose. Its symbol is a Taino Indian. Its nicknames are LSU and Upsilons.

== Chapters ==
Lambda Sigma Upsilon has chartered 89 undergraduate and two alumni chapters. In 2026, it has 55 active undergraduate chapters, two graduate/professional chapters, and five alumni associations.

== Activities ==
Lambda Sigma Upsilon participates in stepping and hosts cultural programs. After the passing of one of its founding fathers, Alberto Rivera, in June 1989 due to HIV/AIDS complications, Lambda Sigma Upsilon selected HIV/AIDS research and awareness as its primary philanthropy.

== Foundation ==
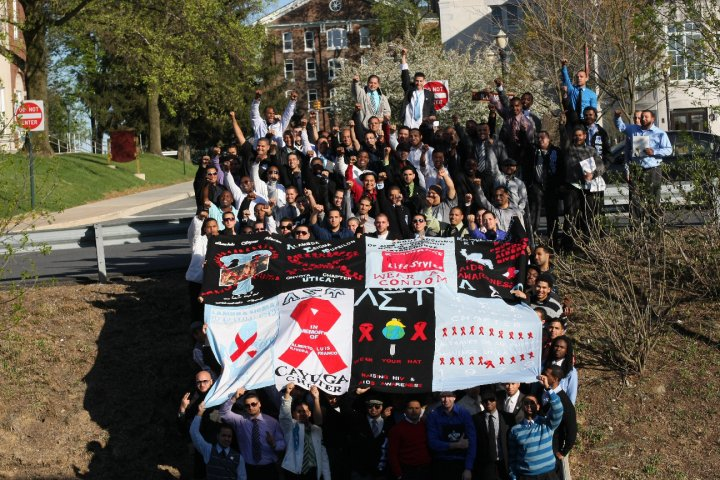
Lambda Sigma Upsilon, Latino Fraternity Philanthropy.

The Latinos Siempre Unidos Foundation is a 501(c)3 non-profit foundation founded on October 2, 2017. It operates separately and independently of the fraternity. The purpose of the foundation is to provide scholarships to Latinos, as well as other minorities, enrolled in high school or college who have shown a commitment to leadership and education. The Latinos Siempre Unidos Foundation also endows surrounding neighborhoods and communities with new prospects to further learning by supporting fiscally and physically organizations, groups, clubs, associations, and companies that show values in line with the organization.

== Chapter and member misconduct ==
In January 2020, the fraternity's chapter at the University of North Carolina at Charlotte was suspended through 2022 after allegations of underage drinking and hazing were reported to have occurred in October 2019.

== See also ==
- List of Latino Greek-letter organizations
- List of social fraternities
- National Association of Latino Fraternal Organizations
