= List of Lambda Theta Phi chapters =

Lambda Theta Phi is a Latino social fraternity in the United States. It was established in 1975, at Kean University. The fraternity has collegiate and alumni chapters.

== Collegiate chapters ==
In the following list of undergraduate chapters, active chapters are indicated in bold and inactive chapters and institutions are indicated in italics.

Chapter	Charter date	Institution	Location	Status	Ref.
**Alpha**	December 1, 1975	Kean University	Union Township, New Jersey	Active	
**Beta**	December 11, 1978	Rutgers University–New Brunswick	New Brunswick, New Jersey	Active	
**Gamma**	April 27, 1980	The College of New Jersey	Ewing Township, New Jersey	Active	
Delta	April 27, 1980– 2001	Upsala College	East Orange, New Jersey	Inactive	(Note: Chapter closed because the college ceased operations.)
**Epsilon**	March 25, 1984	Seton Hall University	South Orange, New Jersey	Active	
Zeta	March 30, 1986	Stevens Institute of Technology	Hoboken, New Jersey	Inactive	
**Eta**	February 28, 1987	New Jersey Institute of Technology	Newark, New Jersey	Active	
**Eta**	February 28, 1987	Rutgers University–Newark	Newark, New Jersey	Active	
**Theta**	November 20, 1980	Stockton University	Pomona, New Jersey	Active	
**Iota**	February 24, 1991	Rider University	Lawrence Township, New Jersey	Active	
Kappa	February 24, 1991– 20xx ?	Montclair State University	Montclair, New Jersey	Inactive	
**Lambda**	February 24, 1991	University of Connecticut	Storrs, Connecticut	Inactive	
**Mu**	March 8, 1992	Rutgers University–Camden	Camden, New Jersey	Active	
Nu	March 8, 1992	Saint Peter's University	Jersey City, New Jersey	Inactive	
**Xi**	March 8, 1992	William Paterson University	Wayne, New Jersey	Active	
**Omicron**	February 28, 1993– 20xx ?	Rowan University	Glassboro, New Jersey	Active	
**Pi**	February 28, 1993	Monmouth University	West Long Branch, New Jersey	Active	
Rho	February 28, 1993– 20xx ?	West Chester University	West Chester, Pennsylvania	Inactive	
**Sigma**	February 26, 1994	Fairleigh Dickinson University	Teaneck, New Jersey	Active	
Tau	November 6, 1994– 20xx ?	Central Connecticut State University	New Britain, Connecticut	Active	
**Upsilon**	March 5, 1995	University of Hartford	West Hartford, Connecticut	Active	
Phi	March 5, 1995– 20xx ?	University of Florida	Gainesville, Florida	Inactive	
Chi	October 19, 1995– 20xx ?	Cornell University	Ithaca, New York	Active	
Chi	October 19, 1995– 20xx ?	Ithaca College	Ithaca, New York	Active	
Psi	November 3, 1995– 20xx ?	Trinity College	Hartford, Connecticut	Inactive	
Omega	November 19, 1995– 20xx ?	University of Delaware	Newark, Delaware	Inactive	
**Alpha Alpha**	November 17, 1996	University of Central Florida	Orlando, Florida	Active	
Alpha Beta	November 17, 1996– 20xx ?	Syracuse University	Syracuse, New York	Inactive	
Alpha Gamma	November 17, 1996– 20xx ?	West Virginia Wesleyan College	Buckhannon, West Virginia	Inactive	
**Alpha Delta**	November 24, 1996	California State Polytechnic University, Pomona	Pomona, California	Active	
**Alpha Epsilon**	February 16, 1997	Bloomfield College	Bloomfield, New Jersey	Active	
Alpha Zeta	March 9, 1997– 20xx ?	University of California, Riverside	Riverside, California	Inactive	
Alpha Eta	July 27, 1997– 20xx ?	University of Texas at Austin	Austin, Texas	Inactive	
**Alpha Theta**	July 27, 1997	Texas A&M University	College Station, Texas	Active	
Alpha Iota	August 10, 1997– 20xx ?	California State University, Long Beach	Long Beach, California	Inactive	
Alpha Kappa	October 5, 1997– 20xx ?	Florida International University	Miami, Florida	Inactive	
Alpha Lambda	October 2, 1997– 2019	University of California, Los Angeles	Los Angeles, California	Inactive	
Alpha Mu	February 16, 1997– 20xx ?	Le Moyne College	DeWitt, New York	Inactive	
Alpha Nu	November 2, 1997– 20xx ?	Pennsylvania State University	University Park, Pennsylvania	Inactive	
Alpha Xi	November 2, 1997– 20xx ?	James Madison University	Harrisonburg, Virginia	Inactive	
**Alpha Omicron**	November 23, 1997	University of Michigan	Ann Arbor, Michigan	Active	
Alpha Pi	March 15, 1998– 20xx ?	New Jersey City University	Jersey City, New Jersey	Inactive	
**Alpha Rho**	March 15, 1998	Drexel University	Philadelphia, Pennsylvania	Active	
**Alpha Rho**	March 15, 1998	La Salle University	Philadelphia, Pennsylvania	Active	
**Alpha Rho**	March 15, 1998	Temple University	Philadelphia, Pennsylvania	Active	
Alpha Sigma	March 22, 1998– 20xx ?	Arizona State University	Tempe, Arizona	Inactive	
**Alpha Tau**	April 5, 1998	University of North Texas	Denton, Texas	Active	
Alpha Upsilon	July 26, 1998– 20xx ?	University of New Mexico	Albuquerque, New Mexico	Inactive	
Alpha Phi	October 18, 1998– 20xx ?	Eastern Illinois University	Charleston, Illinois	Inactive	
**Alpha Chi**	October 18, 1998	University of Illinois Chicago	Chicago, Illinois	Active	
**Alpha Psi**	November 1, 1998	University of South Florida	Tampa, Florida	Active	
**Alpha Omega**	November 15, 1998	California Polytechnic State University, San Luis Obispo	San Luis Obispo, California	Active	
**Beta Alpha**	March 21, 1999	California State University, Dominguez Hills	Carson, California	Active	
Beta Beta	April 14, 1999– 20xx ?	University of Texas at Arlington	Arlington, Texas	Inactive	
Beta Gamma	October 31, 1999– 20xx ?	Nova Southeastern University	Fort Lauderdale, Florida	Inactive	
Beta Delta	October 31, 1999– 20xx ?	Embry–Riddle Aeronautical University, Daytona Beach	Daytona Beach, Florida	Inactive	
**Beta Epsilon**	November 14, 1999	University of Detroit Mercy	Detroit, Michigan	Active	
**Beta Zeta**	March 26, 2000	San Jose State University	San Jose, California	Active	
Beta Eta	April 1, 2000– 20xx ?	Vanderbilt University	Nashville, Tennessee	Inactive	
Beta Theta	April 16, 2000– 20xx ?	University of Miami	Coral Gables, Florida	Inactive	
**Beta Iota**	October 29, 2000	Florida State University	Tallahassee, Florida	Active	
Beta Kappa	January 14, 2001– 20xx ?	California State University, San Bernardino	San Bernardino, California	Inactive	
**Beta Lambda**	March 6, 2000	University of Southern California	Los Angeles, California	Active	
Beta Mu	August 27, 2000– 20xx ?	University of Maryland, Baltimore County	Catonsville, Maryland	Inactive	
**Beta Nu**	May 11, 2001	Fairleigh Dickinson University	Madison, New Jersey	Active	
Beta Xi	April 1, 2001– 2018	Florida Atlantic University	Boca Raton, Florida	Inactive	
**Beta Omicron**	November 3, 2001	California State University, Fresno	Fresno, California	Active	
**Beta Pi**	November 18, 2001	Texas Christian University	Fort Worth, Texas	Active	
Beta Rho	November 18, 2001– 20xx ?	Texas State University	San Marcos, Texas	Inactive	
**Beta Sigma**	January 17, 2004	University of Illinois Urbana–Champaign	Champaign, Illinois	Active	
Beta Tau	May 20, 2001– 20xx ?	Texas Wesleyan University	Fort Worth, Texas	Inactive	
**Beta Upsilon**	December 3, 2005	University of California, Davis	Davis, California	Active	
Beta Phi	May 11, 2002– 20xx ?	Ramapo College	Mahwah, New Jersey	Inactive	
**Beta Chi**	May 9, 2004	University of California, Berkeley	Berkeley, California	Active	
**Beta Psi**	August 7, 2005	Western Illinois University	Macomb, Illinois	Active	
**Beta Omega**	December 7, 2003	California State Polytechnic University, Humboldt	Arcata, California	Active	
Gamma Alpha	July 29, 2005– 2016	University of Houston	Houston, Texas	Inactive	
**Gamma Beta**	February 27, 2005	University of Arizona	Tucson, Arizona	Active	
**Gamma Gamma**	March 24, 2002	University of Tennessee	Knoxville, Tennessee	Active	
Gamma Delta	March 7, 2004– 20xx ?	University of California, Santa Barbara	Santa Barbara, California	Inactive	
**Gamma Epsilon**	June 23, 2007	University of Georgia	Athens, Georgia	Active	
Gamma Zeta	November 3, 2001– 20xx ?	San Francisco State University; University of San Francisco	San Francisco, California	Inactive	
**Gamma Eta**	May 18, 2003	California State University, Fullerton	Fullerton, California	Active	
**Gamma Theta**	April 6, 2006	University of Wisconsin–Madison	Madison, Wisconsin	Active	
**Gamma Iota**	May 6, 2007	University of North Carolina at Charlotte	Charlotte, North Carolina	Active	
**Gamma Kappa**	November 16, 2002	Wayne State University	Detroit, Michigan	Active	
Gamma Lambda	March 13, 2008– 20xx ?	University of Idaho	Moscow, Idaho	Inactive	
**Gamma Mu**	March 2, 2008	George Mason University	Fairfax, Virginia	Active	
Gamma Nu	April 12, 2008– 20xx ?	University of Missouri–Kansas City	Kansas City, Missouri	Inactive	
**Gamma Xi**	October 16, 2005	Barry University	Miami Shores, Florida	Active	
**Gamma Omicron**	May 29, 2009	California State University, East Bay	Hayward, California	Active	
**Gamma Pi**	November 7, 2009	Georgia State University	Atlanta, Georgia	Active	
**Gamma Rho**	June 8, 2008	Kennesaw State University	Kennesaw, Georgia	Active	
**Gamma Sigma**	February 6, 2011	North Carolina State University	Raleigh, North Carolina	Active	
Gamma Tau	January 24, 2009– 20xx ?	California State University, Sacramento	Sacramento, California	Active	
Gamma Upsilon	April 17, 2011– 20xx ?	DePaul University	Chicago, Illinois	Inactive	
Gamma Phi	April 30, 2011– 20xx ?	Texas Tech University	Lubbock, Texas	Inactive	
**Gamma Chi**	November 5, 2011	Iowa State University	Ames, Iowa	Active	
Gamma Psi	March 3, 2011– 20xx ?	University of Wisconsin–Whitewater	Whitewater, Wisconsin	Inactive	
**Gamma Omega**	April 3, 2010	University at Albany, SUNY	Albany, New York	Active	
**Delta Alpha**	March 11, 2012	Sam Houston State University	Huntsville, Texas	Active	
**Delta Beta**	April 22, 2012– 2020	Michigan State University	East Lansing, Michigan	Active	
Delta Gamma	April 22, 2012	San Diego State University	San Diego, California	Inactive	
**Delta Delta**	April 22, 2012	University of Missouri	Columbia, Missouri	Active	
Delta Epsilon	April 4, 2010– 2016	Oregon State University	Corvallis, Oregon	Inactive	
**Delta Zeta**	July 8, 2012	University of West Georgia	Carrollton, Georgia	Active	
Delta Eta	March 13, 2011	University of Maryland, College Park	College Park, Maryland	Inactive	
**Delta Theta**	June 28, 2013	California State University, Chico	Chico, California	Active	
**Delta Iota**	April 20, 2014	Northern Illinois University	DeKalb, Illinois	Active	
**Delta Kappa**	October 18, 2016	California State University, Northridge	Los Angeles, California	Active	
Delta Lambda	October 18, 2014– 20xx ?	Armstrong State University	Savannah, Georgia	Inactive	
**Delta Mu**	April 19, 2014	University of Washington	Seattle, Washington	Active	
**Delta Nu**	October 18, 2015	Clemson University	Clemson, South Carolina	Active	
Delta Xi	November 22, 2015– 2020	East Carolina University	Greenville, North Carolina	Inactive	
**Delta Omicron**	November 1, 2015	University of North Carolina at Greensboro	Greensboro, North Carolina	Active	
Delta Pi	April 11, 2008– 20xx ?	University of North Carolina at Pembroke	Pembroke, North Carolina	Inactive	
**Delta Rho**	October 1, 2006	Towson University	Towson, Maryland	Active	
**Delta Sigma**	March 26, 2016	Boise State University	Boise, Idaho	Active	
Delta Tau	April 12, 2008– 2023	University of Northern Iowa	Cedar Falls, Iowa	Inactive	
**Delta Upsilon**	February 21, 2016	University of Nevada, Reno	Reno, Nevada	Active	
**Delta Phi**	April 23, 2016	Southern Illinois University Carbondale	Carbondale, Illinois	Active	
**Delta Chi**	March 24, 2018	University of Texas at Dallas	Richardson, Texas	Active	
**Delta Psi**	February 24, 2019	Illinois State University	Normal, Illinois	Active	
**Delta Omega**	March 15, 2019	Davidson College	Davidson, North Carolina	Active	
**Epsilon Alpha**	February 25, 2024	American University	Washington, D.C.	Active	
**Epsilon Beta**	February 25, 2024	University of Tennessee at Chattanooga	Chattanooga, Tennessee	Active	
**Epsilon Gamma**	October 5, 2024	Georgia Institute of Technology	Atlanta, Georgia	Active	
**Epsilon Delta**	May 1, 2026	University of California, San Diego	San Diego, California	Active	
**Epsilon Epsilon**	May 15, 2026	Idaho State University	Pocatello, Idaho	Active	
**Epsilon Zeta**	June 16, 2026	Ferris State University	Big Rapids, Michigan	Active	
**Epsilon Eta**	July 1, 2026	Western Michigan University	Kalamazoo, Michigan	Active	
**Epsilon Theta**	July 10, 2026	Stephen F. Austin State University	Nacogdoches, Texas	Active	

== Associate Chapters ==
Following are the undergraduate associate chapters, of Lambda Theta Phi.

Chapter	Date formed	Institution	Location	Status	Ref.
California Associate chapter 1	October 19, 1997	California State University, Los Angeles	Los Angeles, CA	Inactive	
California Associate chapter 2		University of California, Santa Cruz	Santa Cruz, CA	Inactive	
California Associate chapter 3	March 20, 2016	Notre Dame de Namur University	Belmont, CA	Inactive	
California Associate chapter 4	March 23, 2025	University of the Pacific	Stockton, CA	Active	
Colorado Associate Chapter 1		Metropolitan State University of Denver	Denver, CO	Active	
Connecticut Associate Chapter 1		University of New Haven	New Haven, CT	Inactive	
Connecticut Associate Chapter 2	November 21, 2017	Quinnipiac University	Hamden, CT	Active	
Florida Associate Chapter 1	October 16, 2005	Miami International University of Art & Design	Miami, FL	Inactive	(Note: Chapter closed because the college ceased operations.)
Georgia Associate Chapter 1	June 15, 2019	University of North Georgia	Gainesville, GA	Active	
Iowa Associate Chapter 1	April 21, 2018	University of Iowa	Iowa City, IA	Active	
Nevada Associate Chapter 1	February 7, 2016	Nevada State University	Henderson, NV	Inactive	
New Mexico Associate Chapter 1	August 4, 2004	Eastern New Mexico University	Portales, NM	Inactive	
New York Associate Chapter 1	May 11, 2002	Iona College	New Rochelle, NY	Inactive	
New York Associate Chapter 2	March 16, 2004	John Jay College	New York City, NY	Inactive	
New York Associate Chapter 3	April 1, 2006	State University of New York at Stony Brook	Stony Brook, NY	Inactive	
New York Associate Chapter 4		University at Buffalo	Buffalo, NY	Inactive	
New York Associate Chapter 5	March 24, 2011	Alfred State College	Alfred, NY	Inactive	
New York Associate Chapter 6	June 1, 2011	City College of New York	New York City, NY	Inactive	
New York Associate Chapter 7	February 5, 2012	Baruch College	New York City, NY	Inactive	
North Carolina Associate Chapter 1	April 5, 2014	Johnson C. Smith University	Charlotte, NC	Inactive	
North Carolina Associate Chapter 2	April 2026	Wake Forest University	Winston-Salem, NC	Active	
Ohio Associate Chapter 1	February 13, 2009	Ohio State University	Columbus, OH	Inactive	
Pennsylvania Associate Chapter 1	September 26, 2021	Kutztown University of Pennsylvania	Kutztown, PA	Active	
South Carolina Associate Chapter 1	October 15, 2017	College of Charleston	Charleston, SC	Inactive	
Tennessee Associate Chapter 1	February 23, 2008	Middle Tennessee State University	Murfreesboro, TN	Inactive	
Texas Associate Chapter 1	November 9, 2003	Tarleton State University	Stephenville, TX	Inactive	
Virginia Associate Chapter 1	April 7, 2012	Virginia Commonwealth University	Richmond, VA	Inactive	(Note: Associate chapter was not recognized by the university for several years and operated "underground" until sanctioned reactivation efforts commenced in 2024.)
Washington Associate chapter	March 26, 2016	Eastern Washington University	Cheney, WA	Inactive	
Wisconsin Associate chapter	April 18, 2015	University of Wisconsin–Milwaukee	Milwaukee, WI	Inactive	

== Alumni Chapters and Alumni Associate Chapters ==
Following is a list of Lambda Theta Phi alumni chapters and alumni associate chapters, with active chapters indicated in bold and inactive chapters in italics.

Chapter	Location	Status	Ref.
Lambda Alpha	New York City, New York	Active	
Lambda Beta	Tampa, Florida	Active	
Lambda Gamma	Paterson, New Jersey	Active	
Lambda Delta	Albuquerque, New Mexico	Active	
Lambda Epsilon	Houston, Texas	Active	
Lambda Zeta	Arizona	Active	
Lambda Eta	District of Columbia, Maryland, and Virginia	Active	
Lambda Theta	Los Angeles, California	Active	
Lambda Iota	South Florida	Active	
Lambda Kappa	Hartford, Connecticut	Active	
Lambda Lambda	Chicago, Illinois	Active	
Lambda Mu	Atlanta, Georgia	Active	
Lambda Nu	Trenton, New Jersey	Active	
Lambda Xi	Northern California	Active	
Lambda Omicron	Fresno, California	Active	
Lambda Pi	Charlotte, North Carolina	Active	
Lambda Rho	Orlando, Florida	Active	
Lambda Sigma	North Texas	Active	
Lambda Tau	Philadelphia, Pennsylvania	Active	
Lambda Upsilon	Atlantic City, New Jersey	Active	
Lambda Phi	Riverside, California	Active	
Lambda Chi	Seattle, Washington	Active	
Lambda Psi	Detroit, Michigan	Active	
Lambda Omega	San Antonio, Texas	Active	
Lambda Alpha Alpha	Denver, Colorado	Active	
Lambda Alpha Beta	Austin, Texas	Active	
Associate Alumni	Inland Empire, California	Active	
Associate Alumni	East Bay, California	Active	
Associate Alumni	San Diego, California	Active	
Associate Alumni	Boise, Idaho	Active	
Associate Alumni	Orange County, California	Active	
Associate Alumni	Nashville, Tennessee	Active	
Associate Alumni	Reading, Pennsylvania	Active	
