= Sigma Phi Rho =

African American college fraternity

- ΣΦΡ
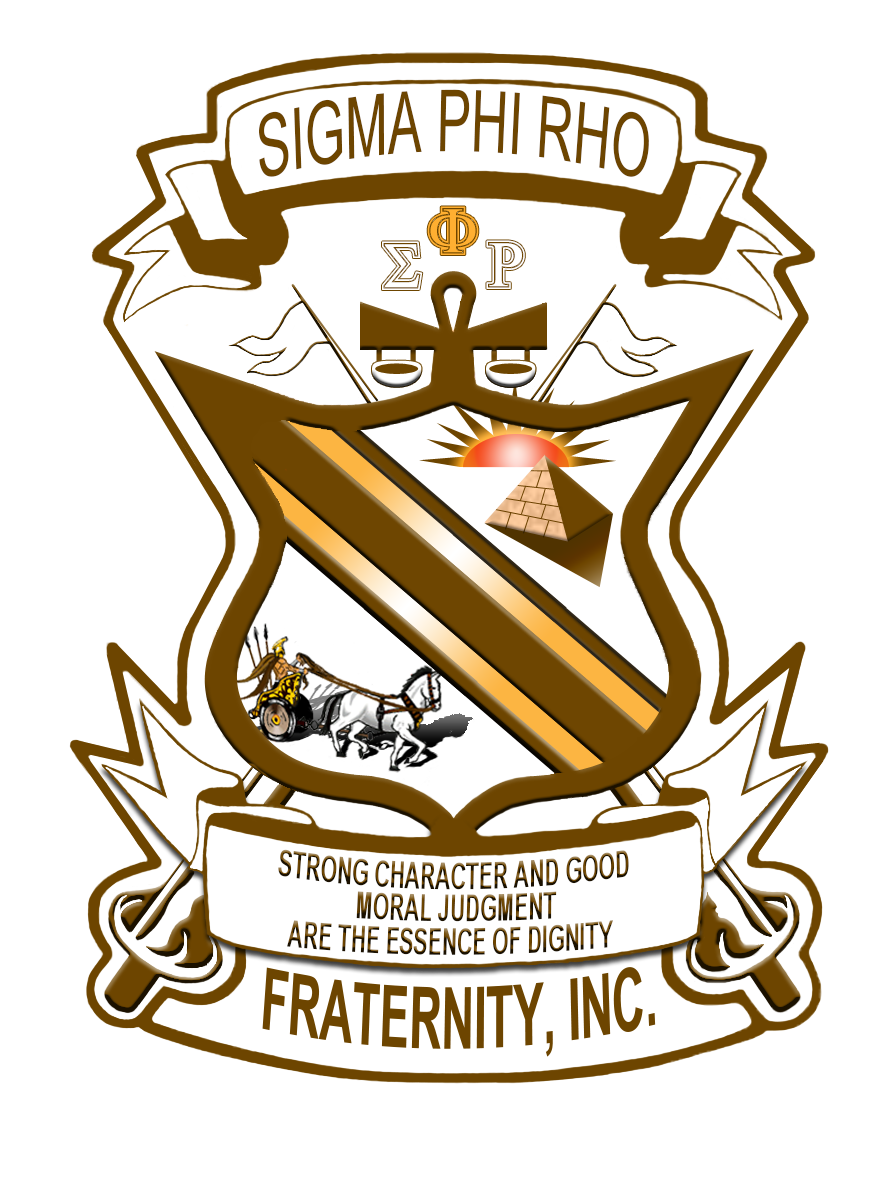
- Founded: April 26, 1979; 47 years ago Wagner College
- Type: Social
- Affiliation: Independent
- Status: Active
- Emphasis: African American
- Scope: National
- Motto: "Strong character and good moral judgment are the essence of dignity"
- Pillars: Scholarship, Brotherhood, Leadership, Service, Empowerment
- Colors: Brown, White, and Gold
- Symbol: Ram
- Flower: White and Gold Roses
- Publication: The Scales
- Chapters: 21 active
- Colonies: 12
- Nickname: The Rho, Rhoman, Death RHO
- Headquarters: 653-A Malcolm X Blvd. New York City, New York 10037; United States
- Website: www.sigmaphirho.org

Sigma Phi Rho Fraternity, Inc. (ΣΦΡ) is an African American collegiate fraternity. It was established at Wagner College in Staten Island, New York in 1978.

== History ==
Sigma Phi Rho Fraternity, Inc. was started in 1978 and chartered by thirteen men from Wagner College in 1979. The founding members of Sigma Phi Rho were:

- Ronald Adams
- Courtney A. Bennett
- Clarence R. Bishop
- Gregory F. J. Brown
- James Chambers
- Edmund Folkes
- Harvey Greenidge
- Alton James
- Anthony Locascio
- Francisco Pena
- Marvin Raye
- Leroy Reynolds
- John T. Sims
- Darren Lightburn, honorary grandfather

The Beta chapter was added at the State University of New York at Brockport in 1980, followed by the Gamma chapter at the University of North Carolina Charlotte in 1981.

The fraternity's national headquarters is located in New York City.

== Symbols ==
The motto of Sigma Phi Rho is "Strong character and good moral judgment are the essence of dignity". The fraternity's colors are brown, white, and gold. Its pillars are Scholarship, Brotherhood, Leadership, Service, and Empowerment.

== Membership ==
To become a member of Sigma Phi Rho Fraternity Inc. there is a fraternal educational training. Membership of Sigma Phi Rho is open to all sophomores attending an accredited four-year college or university. Academically, the candidates must have at least a 2.7 grade point average based on a 4.0 scale. All candidates must have a documented record of community service. All candidates must display strong character, good moral judgment, and leadership abilities.

There are four classes of membership of Sigma Phi Rho fraternity which are active, inactive, alumni, and honorary. An active member has the full privilege to participate in all fraternity activities. An inactive member has restricted participation in the chapter activities An alumni member has finished college and is possibly pursuing an advanced degree. An honorary member has the rights and privileges of full membership. To become an honorary member a person has to have done something remarkable, whether it's through community service, academically or some other achievement.

Sigma Phi Rho is a non-hazing organization. Sigma Phi Rho Fraternity, Incorporated does not consent to, condone, or authorize any act of hazing, both mentally and physically, or violence towards potential candidates as a term or condition of membership

== Chapters ==
Following is a partial list of Sigma Phi Rho chapters. Active chapters are in bold. Inactive chapters are in italics.

Chapter	Charter date and range	Institution	Location	Status	Ref.
**Alpha**	1978	Wagner College	Staten Island, New York City, New York	Active	
**Beta**	October 25, 1980	State University of New York at Brockport	Brockport, New York	Active	
Gamma (First)	1981–xxxx ?	University of North Carolina at Charlotte	Charlotte, North Carolina	Inactive	
Delta (First) (see Tau)	1981–c. 1982	Johnson C. Smith University	Charlotte, North Carolina	Inactive	
**Epsilon**	1981	New York Metro Chapter	New York City, New York	Active	
**Zeta**	1981	Montclair State University	Montclair, New Jersey	Active	
**Eta**	1981	State University of New York at New Paltz	New Paltz, New York	Active	
**Theta**	September 1, 1983	University of Rochester	Rochester, New York	Active	
**Delta (Second)**	November 12, 1983	State University of New York at Old Westbury	Old Westbury, New York	Active	
**Iota**	July 25, 1985	College of Staten Island	Staten Island, New York	Active	
**Kappa**	July 25, 1985	New York Institute of Technology	Long Island, New York	Active	
**Lambda**	1990	University of California, Santa Barbara	Santa Barbara, California	Active	
**Mu**	2002	University of Massachusetts Dartmouth	Dartmouth, Massachusetts	Active	
**Nu**	2009	Lehman College	Bronx, New York	Active	
**Xi**	April 24, 1989	State University of New York at Albany	Albany, New York	Active	
**Omicron**	1988	Ramapo College	Mahwah, New Jersey	Active	
**Pi**	December 16, 1989	State University of New York at Delhi	Delhi, New York	Active	
Rho				Inactive ?	
**Sigma**	1995	Caldwell University	Caldwell, New Jersey	Active	
**Tau** (see Delta First)		Johnson C. Smith University	Charlotte, North Carolina	Active	
**Upsilon**		Buffalo State University	Buffalo, New York	Active	
Phi				Inactive ?	
Chi				Inactive ?	
Psi				Inactive ?	
Omega				Inactive ?	
Alpha Alpha				Inactive ?	
Alpha Beta				Inactive ?	
**Alpha Gamma**	2005	San Jose State University	San Jose, California	Active	
**Alpha Delta**	20xx ?	California State University, Northridge	Los Angeles, California	Active	
**Gamma (Second)**		University of North Carolina at Greensboro	Greensboro, North Carolina	Active	
		American International University		Colony	
		Brooklyn College	New York City, New York	Colony	
		Long Island University		Colony	
		Marist College	Poughkeepsie, New York	Colony	
		Medgar Evers College	New York City, New York	Colony	
		Pace University		Colony	
		South Carolina State University	Orangeburg, South Carolina	Colony	
		Southern Connecticut State University	New Haven, Connecticut	Colony	
		St. John's University	New York City, New York	Colony	
		State University of New York at Morrisville	Morrisville, New York	Colony	
		State University of New York at Oneonta	Oneonta, New York	Colony	
		Stony Brook University	Stony Brook, New York	Colony	

== Auxiliary groups ==
=== Rho Rhoses ===
The Rho Rhoses is the women's auxiliary group for Sigma Phi Rho. The Rho Rhoses was also founded at Wagner College on December 4, 1980. To become a member of Rhoses, there are certain programs in place in order to become a fully blossomed, including the Bud program. The Bud program starts the young women who are interested, as Seeds or Rose Buds. The purpose of the Rose Buds is to aid and assist brothers in the training process, in addition to serving their school and aid in its development and growth.

=== Rhoman's Court ===
The Rhoman's Court is the official group for high school students interested Sigma Phi Rho.

=== Prophets ===
The Prophets are an interest group for college freshman. Since Sigma Phi Rho does not accept freshmen into the "Scales" Club, this group helps develop and mentor these young men. During the Prophet experience, Rho Brothers help freshman acclimate to college life and prepare for their possible fraternal journey—specifically focusing on developing scholarly habits, character, and good leadership qualities.

== See also ==
- List of African American Greek & Fraternal Organizations
- List of Latino Greek-letter organizations
