= List of fraternities and sororities in Puerto Rico =

Don Luis A. Ferré member of ΦΣΑ; some of the most prominent people in Puerto Rico belong to fraternities and sororities

This is a list of social fraternities and sororities in Puerto Rico. There are several service, professional, and honorary fraternities and sororities from the United States which have chapters in Puerto Rico. The following list is composed of Greek Letter social organizations founded in Puerto Rico, by Puerto Ricans. The large majority don't have chapters outside the island. An exception to this is those organizations that are members of the Concilio Interfraternitario Puertorriqueño de la Florida, the five fraternities that are members of the CIPFI are also members of the Concilio Interfraternitario de Puerto Rico (CIPR) or Inter-Fraternity Council of Puerto Rico, along with the two oldest Puerto Rican sororities, those five fraternities and two sororities are considered as being the strongest.

Traditionally Puerto Rican fraternity members would wear a ribbon or sash while in formal wear much like the band in German Fraternities. In April 2026 the government of Puerto Rico passed a law declaring every May 15 the Day of Fraternities and Sororities in Puerto Rico.

== Fraternities ==
Name	Nickname	Founded	Founding location	Type	Scope	Affiliation	Status	References
Alpha Beta Chi	ABX	1941	University of Puerto Rico, Río Piedras Campus	Collegiate	International	CIPR	Active	
Alpha Omicron Sigma	Omicron	1957	Pontifical Catholic University of Puerto Rico	Collegiate	National	Independent	Active	
Alpha Sigma Upsilon	Upsilon	1990		Collegiate	national	Independent		
Delta Phi Theta	Delta	1961		Collegiate	National	Independent		
Nu Sigma Beta	Nu Sigma	1937	University of Puerto Rico, Rio Piedras Campus.	Collegiate	Regional	CIPR	Active	
Phi Beta Gamma	Phi Beta	1954		Collegiate	National	Independent		
Phi Delta Gamma	Phi Delta	1942	College of Agriculture and Mechanic Arts	Collegiate	National	CIPR	Active	
Phi Delta Sigma		1953	Canovanas PR	Collegiate	National	Independent	Pause	
Phi Epsilon Chi	Phi Epsilon	1943	University of Puerto Rico at Mayagüez	Collegiate	National	Independent	Active	
Phi Eta Mu	Phi Eta	1923	University of Puerto Rico, Rio Piedras Campus.	Collegiate	International	CIPR	Active	
Phi Eta Sigma	Phi Eta Sigma	1959	Colegio Ponceño	High School	Local	Independent	Active	
Phi Sigma Alpha	Sigma	1928	University of Puerto Rico, Rio Piedras Campus.	Collegiate	International	CIPR	Active	
Phi Zeta Chi	Phi Zeta	1958	University of Puerto Rico at Mayagüez	Collegiate	National	Independent		
Zeta Mu Gamma	Zeta	1943	Mayagüez, Puerto Rico	High School	Local	Independent	Active	
Zeta Phi Beta		1957	University of Puerto Rico at Mayagüez	Collegiate	National	Independent	Active	

== Sororities ==
Name	Nickname	Founded	Founding location	Type	Scope	Affiliation	Status	References
Mu Alpha Phi	Mu	1927	University of Puerto Rico, Río Piedras Campus	Collegiate	International	CIPR	Active	
Eta Gamma Delta	Etas	1928	University of Puerto Rico, Río Piedras Campus	Collegiate	International	CIPR	Active	
Joy Seekers Sorority	Joys	1952	Mayagüez, Puerto Rico	High School	local	independent	Active	
Phi Delta Kappa	Kappa's	1958	Ponce, Puerto Rico	High School	National	independent	Active	
Eta Phi Zeta	Las Phi Zetas	1969	University of Puerto Rico at Utuado	Collegiate	National	Independent		
Delta Phi Eta	Deltas	1982	University of Puerto Rico, Mayagüez Campus	Collegiate	National	Independent	Active	
Nu Delta Sigma	Nu	1983	Interamerican University of Puerto Rico	Collegiate	National	Independent	Active	
Sigma Epsilon Chi	Epsilonas	2003		Collegiate	National	Independent		

== See also ==
- Cultural interest fraternities and sororities
- List of Latino fraternities and sororities
- List of social fraternities
- List of social sororities and women's fraternities
