= Lambda Theta Phi =

American collegiate Latino fraternity

- ΛΘΦ
- Founded: December 1, 1975; 50 years ago Kean College
- Type: Social
- Affiliation: NIC
- Former affiliation: NALFO
- Status: Active
- Emphasis: Latino
- Scope: National
- Motto: "Chivalry Above Self"
- Colors: Brotherhood Brown Pure White
- Symbol
- Flower: White carnation
- Philanthropy: Lambda Theta Phi Foundation
- Chapters: 119 collegiate, 29 associate, 33 alumni
- Nickname: Lambdas
- Headquarters: 181 New Road, Suite 304; Parsippany, New Jersey 07054; United States
- Website: thelambdas.org

Lambda Theta Phi Latin Fraternity, Inc. (ΛΘΦ) is a Latino non-profit social fraternity in the United States with 148 undergraduate chapters and 33 alumni associations.

It was founded on December 1, 1975, at Kean University (formerly known as Kean College) in Union, New Jersey. It was the first of several Latino fraternities to be established during the fuerza phase of the Latino collegiate Greek movement that defined much of the late 1970s and 1980s within the mainland United States. In 1992, Lambda Theta Phi was the first Latino Greek-lettered organization in the U.S. to join the North American Interfraternity Conference, which became the sole national umbrella conference of the fraternity after it rescinded its membership with the National Association of Latino Fraternal Organizations in 2014.

== History ==
=== Formation and early years ===
Lambda Theta Phi Latin Fraternity, Inc. was founded on December 1, 1975, at Kean College in Union, New Jersey, by a group of Latino men of Cuban, Puerto Rican, and Ecuadorian descent. The fraternity was established to provide a space for Latino students to develop leadership skills, promote education, and foster cultural awareness. Prior to its founding, no Latin fraternities were actively operating at the undergraduate level in the mainland United States with multiple active chapters. Existing Greek-letter organizations primarily served Anglo and African American students, while Latino-oriented organizations had largely become inactive. Founding Father Agustin García, who was the first Latino elected to Kean College’s student government, proposed the idea of establishing a fraternity as a means to promote unity among Latino students. Following discussions throughout the fall of 1975, the founders selected the name Lambda Theta Phi, with the Greek letters chosen to reflect the fraternity’s mission and identity. The initial executive board included Agustin García as President, Juan Hernández as Vice President, and other founding members: Wilfredo Ayes, Hiram Cardona, Rafael Crespo, David Díaz, Enrique García, José Ginarte, Rinaldo Lago, Luis Miranda I, Henry Muñoz, Walter Pardo-Villa, Raul Roger, and Raymond Rosa.

During the fraternity's formation, guidance was provided by two faculty members at Kean College, Cayetano J. Socarrás and José A. Quiles, who later became known within the fraternity as the Fraternal Fathers. Socarrás, who had expertise in heraldry, assisted in defining the fraternity's identity and helped design its original shield in 1976. Quiles, who had extensive knowledge of the Greek system, provided structural and administrative support to ensure the fraternity's sustainability. According to members, both individuals played a significant role in shaping the organization during its early years. Socarrás remained involved with the fraternity until his death on January 24, 1994, while Quiles continued to be recognized for his contributions.

The founders of Lambda Theta Phi also received support from members of existing Greek organizations at Kean College, particularly Sigma Theta Chi, the school's oldest local social fraternity, and Alpha Sigma Mu, a veterans' fraternity. Ralph Splendorio, Vice President of Sigma Theta Chi, and Ronald Colucci, President of Alpha Sigma Mu, assisted in the drafting of Lambda Theta Phi’s constitution by providing copies of their organizations' governing documents. The fraternity incorporated structural elements from these sources while maintaining a distinct focus on Latino identity and culture.

As discussions about the fraternity progressed, conversations also emerged regarding the creation of a Latina sorority. While some initially suggested that the women interested in forming an organization be integrated as a "Little Sisters" auxiliary of Lambda Theta Phi, fraternity members ultimately supported the establishment of an independent Latina sorority. This development later led to the formal founding of Lambda Theta Alpha, making Kean College the birthplace of both organizations.

The establishment of Lambda Theta Phi contributed to the growth of Latino Greek organizations in the United States. Its formation marked the beginning of the post-1975 expansion of Latino fraternities and sororities. This development followed earlier efforts in Latino student activism dating back to 1898 during the "principio" (starting) phase of such organizations, which had led to the creation of fraternities such as Phi Iota Alpha and Phi Chi Delta. The founding of Lambda Theta Phi played a role in increasing the representation of Latino students within the Greek system and expanding the presence of Latino-oriented fraternal organizations nationwide.

=== 1990s and 21st century ===
Lambda Theta Phi has achieved several milestones, including becoming the first Latin fraternity to join the National Interfraternity Conference (NIC) in 1992. Additionally, the fraternity published "The History of Lambda Theta Phi" in 1994, authored by Jesus A. Peña, Esq., which serves as an authoritative text on its history.

The Lambda Theta Phi Latin Fraternity Educational Foundation was established in 1998, aimed at awarding scholarships and grants for leadership and educational development. The fraternity also became a member of the National Association of Latino Fraternal Organizations (NALFO) in 2004, though it discontinued its membership in 2014.

== Chapters ==
The organization has 182 chapters made up of various undergraduate and alumni entities throughout the United States.

== Notable members ==
- Robert "Bob" Menendez – Former U.S. Senator from New Jersey (Honorary Brother)

== Hazing and misconduct controversies ==
In 2007, The fraternity was temporarily suspended from Cornell University following a hazing incident on February 23, where pledges were subjected to physical and psychological abuse. A pledge reported being violently removed from a group by fraternity members, resulting in damage to property and being placed in a dark room where he was slapped. Two individuals involved were charged with second-degree hazing and harassment; one pleaded guilty to harassment and was fined, while the other remains pending a court appearance. Pledges also reported being forced to maintain a vow of silence, endure strenuous physical exercises, and were denied adequate sleep. In response, Cornell University banned the involved individuals from campus and initiated a review by the Fraternity and Sorority Affairs office. The fraternity would once again be suspended at the college in 2018 for more incidents of alleged hazing.

In 2017, Lambda Theta Phi was suspended after allegations of underage drinking, hazing, and sexual assault surfaced at the University of Central Florida. Reports indicated that pledges were coerced into exhausting physical and mental exercises while being subjected to fraternity chants containing racial slurs and threats of violence. One member was accused of sexually assaulting an intoxicated individual at a fraternity after-party. The University of Central Florida conducted an investigation, leading to the fraternity's suspension from all campus activities. That same year the organization was also put on disciplinary probation in San José State University after violation of student involvement policy.

For events in Fall 2022 and Spring 2023, the Phi chapter at University of Florida was investigated for hazing violations. Allegations included subjecting new members to food and sleep deprivation, forced alcohol consumption, forced calisthenics, and confinement to a specific location. The new members were reportedly required to wear uniforms, were prohibited from leaving or eating outside the location, and had to pay additional costs for this forced living arrangement. Members were also allegedly assigned numbers based on their height and referred to by their numbers rather than their names. The chapter was accused of continuing operations despite an Interim Suspension. As a result, the fraternity was suspended for five years, from Fall 2023 to Spring 2029, and its charter was revoked by its national organization.

In 2024, The fraternity's chapter at the University of Connecticut was suspended following the arrest of the former chapter president on charges related to hazing activities. The individual was accused of physically assaulting a pledge who failed to complete push-up exercises, leading the victim to quit the fraternity. A second arrest was made on similar charges against the same individual. The university emphasized a zero-tolerance policy toward such behaviors and initiated an investigation into the incidents, with the chapter subsequently receiving indefinite suspension.

== See also ==
- Cultural interest fraternities and sororities
- List of Latino fraternities and sororities
- List of social fraternities
