= Concilio Interfraternitario Puertorriqueño de la Florida =

Florida chapters of five oldest Puerto Rican fraternities

- CIPFI
- Founded: January 12, 2002; 24 years ago Miami, Florida, US
- Type: Umbrella
- Affiliation: Independent
- Status: Defunct
- Emphasis: Puerto Rican fraternities
- Scope: Regional
- Members: 5 fraternities (former) active
- Headquarters: 7300 NW 19th Street, Suite 101; Miami, Florida 33126-1222; United States

The Concilio Interfraternitario Puertorriqueño de la Florida, Inc. (CIPFI) was an umbrella council for the Florida chapters of five oldest Puerto Rican fraternities established in 2002. It dissolved on September 27, 2013.

== History ==
At a meeting of the Orlando chapter of the Phi Eta Mu fraternity on September 1, 2001, chapter president, Dr. Carlos Albizu mentioned the lack of presence of members of the other four Puerto Rican fraternities at their annual picnic. Albizu asked Eduardo Emmanuelli to try and establish links with this fraternities in the Miami area.

Antonio Amadeo, president of the Nu Sigma Beta chapter in Miami, invited Emmanuelli to the chapter's meeting on December 5, 2001. The Nu Sigma Beta brothers showed such interest that members of the remaining three fraternities were invited to on organizational meeting.

On January 12, 2002 at El Viajante restaurant, the first meeting of Concilio Interfraternitario Puertorriqueño de la Florida (CIPFI) took place. The group was formed as an umbrella organization for Puerto Rican fraternities located in Florida, United States. Manuel E. Costas of Phi Sigma Alpha served as the first president. CIPFI was an alternative umbrella organization for fraternities that did not join National Association of Latino Fraternal Organizations or the North American Interfraternity Conference.

CIPFI was chartered as a nonprofit organization in the State of Florida in 2002. Its headquarters were at 7300 NW 19th Street, Suite 101 in Miami, Florida. It dissolved on September 27, 2013.

== Former members ==
Following is a list of the former members of Concilio Interfraternitario Puertorriqueño de la Florida.

Fraternity	Chapters in Florida	Institution	Location	References
Phi Eta Mu	Delta		Florida statewide	
Phi Eta Mu	Jorge Matos Postigo		Miami, Florida	(Note: This is a graduate chapter.)
Phi Eta Mu	Luis D. Miranda		Orlando, Florida	
Phi Sigma Alpha	Epsilon Columbia Activo		Miami, Florida	
Phi Sigma Alpha	Epsilon Columbia Boriquén		Miami, Florida	(Note: This is an alumni chapter.)
Phi Sigma Alpha	Omega Columbia Activo		Orlando, Florida	
Phi Sigma Alpha	Omega Columbia Boriquén		Orlando, Florida	
Nu Sigma Beta	Chi (Second)	Florida State University	Tallahassee, Florida	
Nu Sigma Beta	Omega Prime	University of Miami	Coral Gables, Florida	(Note: Chapter is inactive)
Nu Sigma Beta	Zona Miami		Miami, Florida	
Nu Sigma Beta	Zona Orlanda		Orlando, Florida	
Alpha Beta Chi	Zona Agueibaná		Tampa, Florida	
Alpha Beta Chi	Zona Taina		Miami, Florida	
Alpha Beta Chi	Zona Yaholo		Orlando, Florida	
Phi Delta Gamma	Beta Delta		Tampa, Florida	

== See also ==
- Puerto Rican fraternities and sororities
