= List of Phi Iota Alpha chapters =

Phi Iota Alpha is the oldest active intercollegiate Greek-letter fraternity established for men of Latino descent in the United States. The fraternity was founded on December 26, 1931, from the merger of Sigma Iota and Phi Lambda Alpha, two smaller Latino fraternities. It expanded into a national organization with nine chapters. The fraternity went defunct in 1973 when its last chapter closed.

Phi Iota Alpha was re-established at Rensselaer Polytechnic Institute in the spring semester 1984. The fraternity began expanding, chartering chapters at universities and colleges across the United States. Phi Iota Alpha has collegiate chapters, a graduate/professional chapter, and associate chapters. The fraternity's colonies are called satellites.

== Original chapters ==
=== National chapters ===
Following are the original nine chapters of Phi Iota Alpha within the mainland United States.

Chapter	Charter date and range	Institution	Location	Status	Ref.
Alpha	December 26, 1931 – 1975	Louisiana State University	Baton Rouge, Louisiana	Inactive	(Note: Chapter formed from Sigma Iota, established in 1904.)
Beta	December 26, 1931 – 19xx	University of Southern California	Los Angeles, California	Inactive	(Note: Chapter formed from Phi Lambda Alpha, established in 1919.)
Gamma	December 26, 1931 – 1973	Rensselaer Polytechnic Institute	Troy, New York	Inactive	(Note: Chapter formed from Phi Lambda Alpha, established in 1898.)
Delta	December 26, 1931 – 193x ?	Massachusetts Institute of Technology	Cambridge, Massachusetts	Inactive	(Note: Chapter formed from Phi Lambda Alpha, established in 1921.)
Epsilon	December 26, 1931 – 1955	Trine University	Angola, Indiana	Inactive	
Zeta	December 26, 1931 – 1944	Tulane University	New Orleans, Louisiana	Inactive	(Note: Chapter formed from Sigma Iota, established in 1924.)
Eta	December 26, 1931 –	Loyola University New Orleans	New Orleans, Louisiana	Inactive	(Note: Chapter formed from Sigma Iota, established in 1927.)
Theta	December 26, 1931 – 19xx ?	Columbia University	New York City, New York	Inactive	(Note: Chapter formed from Phi Lambda Alpha, established in 1928.)
Iota	December 26, 1931 – 19xx ?	Cornell University	Ithaca, New York	Inactive	(Note: Chapter formed from Phi Lambda Alpha, established in 1929.)
Kappa	April 1952–19xx ?	University of Miami	Coral Gables, Florida	Inactive	
Nu	1958–1963	Indiana Institute of Technology	Fort Wayne, Indiana	Inactive	

=== International chapters ===
Following are two of the original international chapters of Phi Iota Alpha, adjacent to the mainland United States.

Chapter	Charter date and range	Institution	Location	Status	Ref.
Juarez			Mexico	Inactive	(Note: International chapters of the fraternity did not have a Greek-lettered designation given to them as of 1955.)
Marti			Cuba	Inactive	(Note: International chapters of the fraternity did not have a Greek-lettered designation given to them as of 1955.)

== Current chapters ==
In the following list of Phi Iota Alpha chapters, active chapters are indicated in bold and inactive chapters and institutions are in italics.

Chapters	Charter date and range	Institution	Location	Status	Ref.
**Alpha**	1984	Rensselaer Polytechnic Institute	Troy, New York	Active	
Beta	1987–199x ?, 1997–20xx ?	Stony Brook University	Stony Brook, New York	Inactive	
Gamma	1987–20xx ?	State University of New York at New Paltz	New Paltz, New York	Inactive	
**Delta**	1987	State University of New York at Albany	Albany, New York	Active	
Epsilon	1987–xxxx ?	Binghamton University	Vestal, New York	Inactive	
Zeta	1990–2020	Hofstra University	Hempstead, New York	Inactive	
**Eta**	1991	Union College	Schenectady, New York	Active	
**Eta**	1991	Siena College	Loudonville, New York	Active	
Theta	1992	State University of New York at Old Westbury	Old Westbury, New York	Active	
Iota	1992–20xx ?	State University of New York at Oswego	Oswego, New York	Inactive	(Note: Chapter formed from F I A T, established in 1990.)
**Kappa**	1995	Syracuse University	Syracuse, New York	Active	(Note: Chapter formed from F I A T, established in 1994.)
Lambda	1995	State University College at Buffalo	Buffalo, New York	Inactive	
Lambda	1995	University at Buffalo	Buffalo, New York	Inactive	
**Mu**	1995	Columbia University	New York City, New York	Active	
**Nu**	1996	Boston College	Boston, Massachusetts	Active	
**Nu**	1996	Boston University	Boston, Massachusetts	Active	
**Nu**	1996	Northeastern University	Boston, Massachusetts	Active	
Xi	1996–20xx ?	Harvard University	Cambridge, Massachusetts	Inactive	
Omicron	1996–20xx ?	New York University	New York City, New York	Inactive	
Pi	1997–2022	Rochester Institute of Technology	Rochester, New York	Inactive	(Note: Chapter formed from F I A T Club, established in 1995.)
Pi	1997–2022	University of Rochester	Rochester, New York	Inactive	
Rho	1998–20xx ?	Marist College	Poughkeepsie, New York	Inactive	
Sigma	1998–20xx ?	City University of New York	New York City, New York	Inactive	
Tau	1999–20xx ?	Baylor University	Waco, Texas	Inactive	(Note: Chapter formed from Phi Lambda Alpha, established in 1997.)
Upsilon	1999–xxxx ?	University of Miami	Coral Gables, Florida	Inactive	
**Phi**	1999	Michigan State University	East Lansing, Michigan	Active	
Chi	1999–20xx ?	University of Dayton	Dayton, Ohio	Inactive	
Chi	1999–20xx ?	University of Illinois Chicago	Chicago, Illinois	Inactive	
Psi	1999	LIU Post	Brookville, New York	Active	
**Omega**				Memorial	
Alpha Alpha	2000–20xx ?	Louisiana State University	Baton Rouge, Louisiana	Inactive	
Alpha Beta	2000–20xx ?	University of Maryland, College Park	College Park, Maryland	Inactive	
Alpha Gamma	2000–20xx ?	St. John's University	New York City, New York	Inactive	
Alpha Delta	2000	State University of New York at Plattsburgh	Plattsburgh, New York	Inactive	
**Alpha Epsilon**	2000	California State University, Dominguez Hills	Carson, California	Active	
Alpha Zeta	2000–20xx ?	St. Thomas Aquinas College	Sparkill, New York	Inactive	
Alpha Eta	2002–20xx ?	University of Texas at San Antonio	San Antonio, Texas	Inactive	
Alpha Theta	2005–20xx ?	University of California, Santa Cruz	Santa Cruz, California	Inactive	
Alpha Iota	2006–20xx ?	University of Massachusetts Amherst	Amherst, Massachusetts	Inactive	
Alpha Kappa	200x ?	Villanova University	Villanova, Pennsylvania	Inactive	
**Alpha Lambda**	2007	University of Arkansas	Fayetteville, Arkansas	Active	
**Alpha Mu**	2008	Florida State University	Tallahassee, Florida	Active	
**Alpha Nu**	2011	University of North Texas	Denton, Texas	Active	(Note: Chapter formed as a colony in 2005.)
Alpha Xi	2011–20xx ?	University of Texas at Austin	Austin, Texas	Inactive	
Alpha Omicron	2011–20xx ?	Texas State University	San Marcos, Texas	Inactive	(Note: Chapter formed as a colony in 2006.)
Alpha Pi	2011–20xx ?	Armstrong State University	Savannah, Georgia	Inactive	
Alpha Rho	2011–20xx ?	Rutgers University–New Brunswick	New Brunswick, New Jersey	Inactive	
Alpha Sigma	2011–20xx ?	Georgia Southern University	Statesboro, Georgia	Inactive	
Alpha Tau	2011	University of California, Santa Barbara	Santa Barbara, California	Inactive	
Alpha Upsilon	2011–20xx ?	Lamar University	Beaumont, Texas	Inactive	
Alpha Phi	2011–20xx ?	Queens College, City University of New York	Flushing, Queens, New York	Inactive	
**Alpha Chi**	2011	Lewis University	Romeoville, Illinois	Active	(Note: Chapter formed as a colony in 2007.)
Alpha Psi	2011–20xx ?	Rutgers University–Newark	Newark, New Jersey	Inactive	
Alpha Psi	2011–20xx ?	New Jersey Institute of Technology	Newark, New Jersey	Inactive	
**Alpha Omega**	2011	Aurora University	Aurora, Illinois	Active	
**Beta Alpha**	2012	Utica University	Utica, New York	Active	
**Beta Beta**	2012	California State University, Long Beach	Long Beach, California	Active	
Beta Gamma	2013–20xx ?	Florida International University	University Park, Florida	Inactive	
**Beta Delta**	2011	East Texas A&M University	Commerce, Texas	Active	(Note: Texas A&M University at Commerce changed its name to East Texas A&M University on 7 November 2024.)
**Beta Epsilon**	201x ?	Texas A&M University	College Station, Texas	Active	
**Beta Zeta**	201x ?	Denison University	Granville, Ohio	Active	(Note: Chapter formed as a colony in 2009.)
Beta Eta	2014–2022	Grand Valley State University	Allendale, Michigan	Inactive	
**Beta Theta**	2014	University of California, San Diego	San Diego, California	Active	
**Beta Iota**	2014	University of South Carolina	Columbia, South Carolina	Active	
Beta Kappa	201x ?	Georgetown University	Washington, D.C.	Inactive	
**Beta Lambda**	201x ?	University of Texas–Pan American	Edinburg, Texas	Active	
Beta Mu	201x ?	Texas Tech University	Lubbock, Texas	Inactive	
**Beta Nu**	201x ?	Western Michigan University	Kalamazoo, Michigan	Active	
**Beta Xi**	2016	University of Kansas	Lawrence, Kansas	Active	
Beta Omicron	2016–2021	Southern Illinois University Carbondale	Carbondale, Illinois	Inactive	
Beta Pi	2017–20xx ?	San Francisco State University	San Francisco, California	Inactive	
**Beta Rho**	2017	University of New Mexico	Albuquerque, New Mexico	Active	
**Beta Sigma**	2017	Kennesaw State University	Cobb County, Georgia	Active	
**Beta Tau**	2019	University of Illinois Urbana-Champaign	Champaign, Illinois	Active	(Note: Chapter started as a colony in 2014.)
**Beta Upsilon**	2019	University of Michigan	Ann Arbor, Michigan	Active	
**Beta Phi**	2021	Northeastern Illinois University	Chicago, Illinois	Active	
**Beta Chi**	2021	George Mason University	Fairfax, Virginia	Active	(Note: Chapter started as a colony in 2013.)
**Beta Psi**	2022	University of Oklahoma	Norman, Oklahoma	Active	
**Beta Omega**	2023	Texas Woman's University	Denton, Texas	Active	
**Gamma Alpha**	2024	Texas A&M International University	Laredo, Texas	Active	
**Gamma Pi**		Graduate and Professional		Active	(Note: Chapter started as a colony in 2015.)
**Emporia State Satellite**		Emporia State University	Emporia, Kansas	Colony	(Note: Colony was established in 2013.)
**University of Central Arkansas Satellite**		University of Central Arkansas	Conway, Arkansas	Colony	(Note: Colony was formed in 2017.)
**Arizona State University Satellite**		Arizona State University	Tempe, Arizona	Colony	(Note: Colony established in 2025.)
**Indiana University Satellite**		Indiana University		Colony	

Phi Iota Alpha chapters are located in the states indicated in red.
