= List of Omega Delta Phi chapters =

Omega Delta Phi is a Latino social fraternity. Alumni organizations are established by alumni members at the city level. All undergraduate entities begin as colonies and later petition internally for chapter status.

== Collegiate chapters ==
Following is a list of the collegiate chapters of Omega Delta Phi. Active chapters are indicated in bold. Inactive chapters are in italics.

Chapter	Charter date and range	Institution	Location	Region	Status	Ref.
**Alpha**	November 25, 1987	Texas Tech University	Lubbock, Texas	Central Plains	Active	
**Beta**	April 5, 1989	University of Texas at El Paso	El Paso, Texas	Southwest	Active	
**Gamma**	September 28, 1990	University of Arizona	Tucson, Arizona	Southwest	Active	
**Delta**	November 23, 1991	Texas A&M University	College Station, Texas	East Texas	Active	
**Epsilon**	September 22, 1992	Arizona State University	Tempe, Arizona	Southwest	Active	
Zeta	April 23, 1995 – 20xx ?	Eastern New Mexico University	Portales, New Mexico	Southwest	Inactive	
**Eta**	September 22, 1992 – 1995; April 4, 1998 – January 24, 2006; December 12, 2008	Sam Houston State University	Huntsville, Texas	East Texas	Active	
**Theta**	April 3, 1993	West Texas A&M University	Canyon, Texas	Central Plains	Active	
**Iota**	November 19, 1994	Northern Arizona University	Flagstaff, Arizona	Southwest	Active	
Kappa	August 27, 1993 – 202x ?	New Mexico State University	Las Cruces, New Mexico	Southwest	Inactive	
**Lambda**	April 20, 1996	University of Washington	Seattle, Washington	Pacific Northwest	Active	
**Mu**	April 19, 1997	Midwestern State University	Wichita Falls, Texas	Central Plains	Active	
Nu	1998 – 20xx ?	Western New Mexico University	Silver City, New Mexico	Southwest	Inactive	
**Xi**	November 23, 1996	University of Oklahoma	Norman, Oklahoma	Central Plains	Active	
**Omicron**	April 19, 1997	University of Wisconsin–Parkside	Kenosha, Wisconsin	Midwest	Active	
**Pi**	November 19, 1997	University of Houston	Houston, Texas	East Texas	Active	
**Rho**	November 22, 1997	Texas State University	San Marcos, Texas	Central Texas	Active	
**Sigma**	April 28, 1997 – 20xx ?; 2023	Southern Methodist University	Dallas, Texas	North Texas	Active	
**Tau**	March 10, 1997	University of Texas at Arlington	Arlington, Texas	North Texas	Active	
**Upsilon**	November 22, 1997	Washington State University	Pullman, Washington	Pacific Northwest	Active	
Phi	1998 – 20xx ?	Instituto Tecnológico Autónomo de México	Mexico City, Mexico		Inactive	
**Chi**	June 26, 1998 – February 21, 2026	University of Texas at Austin	Austin, Texas	Central Texas	Active	
Psi	1998 – 202x ?	Rutgers University	New Brunswick, New Jersey	Northeast	Inactive	
Omega					Memorial	
**Alpha Alpha**	November 25, 1997	Northwestern University	Evanston, Illinois	Midwest	Active	
**Alpha Beta**	April 5, 1998	Michigan State University	Lansing, Michigan	Midwest	Active	
**Alpha Gamma**	February 6, 1999	University of Texas–Rio Grande Valley	Edinburg, Texas	Central Texas	Active	
**Alpha Delta**	February 26, 1999	University of Texas–San Antonio	San Antonio, Texas	Central Texas	Active	
**Alpha Epsilon**	1998 – 2026	Tarleton State University	Waco, Texas	North Texas	Active	
Alpha Zeta	November 21, 1998 – 202x ?	University of Wisconsin–Milwaukee	Milwaukee, Wisconsin	Midwest	Inactive	
**Alpha Eta**	February 22, 1999	University of New Mexico	Albuquerque, New Mexico	Southwest	Active	
**Alpha Theta**	November 6, 1999	Oregon State University	Corvallis, Oregon	Pacific Northwest	Active	
**Alpha Iota**	June 22, 1999	East Texas A&M University	Commerce, Texas	North Texas	Active	(Note: Texas A&M University at Commerce changed its name to East Texas A&M University on 7 November 2024.)
**Alpha Kappa**	May 17, 2003	California State University, Monterey Bay	Seaside, California	Pacific Northwest	Active	
**Alpha Lambda**	April 28, 2001	Stephen F. Austin State University	Nacogdoches, Texas	East Texas	Active	
**Alpha Mu**	July 3, 2002	Texas A&M University–Kingsville	Kingsville, Texas	Central Texas	Active	
**Alpha Nu**	January 26, 2003	University of the Pacific	Stockton, California	Pacific Northwest	Active	
**Alpha Xi**	November 22, 2003	Baylor University	Waco, Texas	Central Texas	Active	
**Alpha Omicron**	April 7, 2005	University of Texas at Dallas	Richardson, Texas	North Texas	Active	
Alpha Pi	February 12, 2005 – 2020	St. Mary's University	San Antonio, Texas	Central Texas	Inactive	
**Alpha Rho**	December 10, 2006	Texas Southern University	Houston, Texas	East Texas	Active	
**Alpha Sigma**	May 14, 2005	University of Illinois at Urbana–Champaign	Urbana, Illinois	Midwest	Active	
**Alpha Tau**	December 3, 2006	Texas A&M International University	Laredo, Texas	Central Texas	Active	
Alpha Upsilon	December 6, 2008 – 2020	University of Florida	Gainesville, Florida	East Texas	Inactive	
**Alpha Phi**	May 6, 2006	University of Nevada, Las Vegas	Paradise, Nevada	Southwest	Active	
**Alpha Chi**	November 15, 2008	University of North Texas	Denton, Texas	North Texas	Active	
**Alpha Psi**	October 30, 2009	University of California, Merced	Merced, California	Pacific Northwest	Active	
**Alpha Omega**	May 27, 2006	University of Wisconsin–Oshkosh	Oshkosh, Wisconsin	Midwest	Active	
**Beta Alpha**	April 16, 2010	Northeastern Illinois University	Chicago, Illinois	Midwest	Active	
**Beta Beta**	December 12, 2010	California State University, Dominguez Hills	Carson, California	Southwest	Active	
**Beta Gamma**	April 4, 2009	Eastern Washington University	Cheney, Washington	Pacific Northwest	Active	
**Beta Delta**	November 5, 2011	University of Nevada, Reno	Reno, Nevada	Pacific Northwest	Active	
**Beta Epsilon**	December 7, 2011	Texas Christian University	Fort Worth, Texas	North Texas	Active	
**Beta Zeta**	April 27, 2012	University of Utah	Salt Lake City, Utah	Southwest	Active	
**Beta Eta**	April 30, 2011	University of Central Oklahoma	Edmond, Oklahoma	Central Plains	Active	
**Beta Theta**	December 2, 2012	Texas A&M University–San Antonio	San Antonio, Texas	Central Texas	Active	
**Beta Iota**	April 14, 2011	University of Illinois at Chicago	Chicago, Illinois	Midwest	Active	
**Beta Kappa**	November 30, 2012	Western Oregon University	Monmouth, Oregon	Pacific Northwest	Active	
**Beta Lambda**	2012	University of Idaho	Moscow, Idaho	Pacific Northwest	Active	(Note: Chapter formed as a colony on December 2, 2006.)
Beta Mu	2016	Our Lady of the Lake University	San Antonio, Texas	Central Texas	Inactive	(Note: Chapter formed as a colony on December 2, 2012.)
**Beta Nu**	2016	Oklahoma State University	Stillwater, Oklahoma	Central Plains	Active	(Note: Chapter formed as a colony on March 29, 2014.)
Beta Xi	2016	Heritage University	Toppenish, Washington	Pacific Northwest	Inactive	(Note: Chapter formed as a colony on May 30, 2014.)
**Beta Omicron**	April 13, 2015	University of the Incarnate Word	San Antonio, Texas	Central Texas	Active	(Note: Chapter formed as a colony on April 13, 2015.)
Beta Pi	October 31, 2012 – 202x ?	Texas A&M University–Corpus Christi	Corpus Christi, Texas	Central Texas	Inactive	
**Beta Rho**	November 14, 2014	Western Michigan University	Kalamazoo, Michigan	Midwest	Active	
**Beta Sigma**	January 14, 2014	University of Houston–Downtown	Houston, Texas	East Texas	Active	
**Beta Tau**	June 6, 2013	Portland State University	Portland, Oregon	Pacific Northwest	Active	
**Beta Upsilon**	May 5, 2008	Southern Illinois University Carbondale	Carbondale, Illinois	Midwest	Active	
**Beta Phi**	December 13, 2015	California State University Fresno	Fresno, California	Southwest	Active	
**Beta Chi**	April 22, 2018	Kansas State University	Manhattan, Kansas	Central Plain	Active	
**Beta Psi**	July 16, 2022	Kennesaw State University	Kennesaw, Georgia	East Texas	Active	
**Beta Omega**	November 11, 2019	University of Nebraska–Lincoln	Lincoln, Nebraska	Central Plains	Active	
**Gamma Alpha**	April 20, 2024	Boise State University	Boise, Idaho	Pacific north west	Active	
		Colorado State University	Fort Collins, Colorado	Southwest	Colony	(Note: Colony formed on January 16, 2015.)
		Prairie View A&M University	Prairie View, Texas	East Texas	Colony	(Note: Colony formed on April 13, 2015.)
		California State University - Bakersfield	Bakersfield, California	Southwest	Colony	(Note: Colony formed on April 30, 2017.)
		Colorado State University–Pueblo	Pueblo, Colorado	Southwest	Colony	(Note: Colony formed on November 18, 2017.)
		Wichita State University	Wichita, Kansas	Central Plains	Colony	(Note: Colony formed on April 4, 2025.)
		Carroll University	Waukesha, Wisconsin	Midwest	Colony	

== Alumni chapters ==
Following is a list of alumni groups in alphabetical order by name. Active chapters are indicated in bold. Inactive chapters are in italics.

Chapter	Charter date	Location	Status	Ref.
**Austin Alumni Association**		Austin, Texas	Active	
**Alumni Association of Arizona**	September 2010	Arizona	Active	
**Beta Zeta Alumni Association**		Salt Lake City, Utah	Active	
**Beta Theta Alumni Association**		San Antonio, Texas	Active	
**Dallas/Fort Worth Alumni Association**	2000	Dallas-Fort Worth, Texas	Active	
**Greater Chicago Alumni Association**		Chicago, Illinois	Active	
**Greater El Paso Alumni Association**		El Paso, Texas	Active	
**Houston Alumni Association**		Houston, Texas	Active	
Northeast		Northeastern United States	Inactive ?	
Northern California Alumni Association	20xx ?–August 2013	Northern California	Inactive	(Note: The Northern California Alumni Association and the Southern California Alumni Association merged to form the Pacific Region Alumni Association in August 2013.)
**Oklahoma Alumni Association**		Oklahoma	Active	
**Pacific Region Alumni Association**	August 2013	California	Active	
**Phoenix AlumKnight Association**		Phoenix, Arizona	Active	
Pullman		Pullman, Washington	Inactive ?	
**Rho Alumni Association**		San Marcos, Texas	Inactive	
**Rio Grande Valley Alumni Association**		Rio Grande Valley, Texas	Active	
**San Antonio Alumni Association**		San Antonio, Texas	Active	
Southern California Alumni Association	20xx ?–August 2013	Southern California	Inactive	
**Wisconsin Alumni Association**		Wisconsin	Active	
