= Phi Eta Mu =

Puerto Rican fraternity

- ΦΗΜ
- Founded: December 17, 1923; 102 years ago University of Puerto Rico, Rio Piedras Campus
- Type: Social
- Affiliation: CIPR; CIPFI
- Status: Active
- Scope: North America
- Tree: Ficus elastica
- Publication: Anuario Phi Eta Mu
- Chapters: 6 active collegiate 14 active graduate
- Members: 5,800+ lifetime
- Headquarters: P.O. Box 1059; Sabana Grande, Puerto Rico 00637; United States
- Website: phietamu.com

Fraternity Phi Eta Mu (ΦΗΜ) is a fraternity founded in Puerto Rico in 1923 at the University of Puerto Rico now University of Puerto Rico, Rio Piedras Campus. All its founders were Puerto Ricans, born on the island of Puerto Rico.

== History ==
=== Political climate ===
During the 1920s, the most important administrative posts in Puerto Rico were filled by direct appointment of the President of the United States. When Charles St. John W. Dean was appointed to the University of Puerto Rico, his style caused discord between the administration and students. This resulted in the first significant student protests and, later, the first university strike at the University of Puerto Rico.

On November 1, 1923, seven students from the College of Law were expelled from the university after campus protests. Preparing for a possible strike, students create a commission to raise funds. This committee included, among others, Isaias M. Crespo and Antonio R. Barceló.

A few days later, students met with the dean of the university and proposed a resolution that required students to report any act of protest performed or planned to be performed in the future. Students refused to approve the resolution. On November 5, 1923, to avoid a strike, the dean restored all suspended or expelled students and ordered the resumption of classes at the university.

=== Phi Eta Mu ===
On December 17, 1923, the student strike leaders Pelayo Román Benítez, Felix Ochoteco, Isaiah M. Crespo, P. Wilson Colberg, Alfonso Paniagua, and Mario Polanco gathered under a gum tree on the grounds of the University of Puerto Rico and founded the fraternity Phi Eta Muto. The purpose of the fraternity was to grant protection and mutual loyalty in the face of repression from the university authorities. Its founders created a constitution, a comprehensive set of regulations, and traditions.

Phi Eta Mu was installed on December 17, 1923, with founding members Wilson P. Colberg, Isaias M. Crespo, Felix Ochoteco Jr., Alfonso Paniagua, Mario Polanco, and Pelayo Román Benítez. Dr. José Menéndez was initiated at a meeting on December 17, 1923, and became the first neophyte of the fraternity. Menéndez also was a member of the fraternity's first board of directors.

In November 1957, Phi Eta Mu joined Phi Sigma Alpha and Nu Sigma Beta to establish the Greek letter umbrella organization Concilio Interfraternitario de Puerto Rico. Eventually, the fraternity established a chapter at every university in Puerto Rico, along with alumni associations in Puerto Rico in the United States. As of today, March 2025, the fraternity has initiated 5,868 members.

== Symbols ==
The fraternity's tree is Ficus elastica. Its publication is Anuario Phi Eta Mu.

=== Other publications ===
- Aclaración y Crítica, 1941 by Antonio S. Pedreira; book
- Paliques, 1952 by Nemesio Canales; book
- Poemas de amor, poemas del paisaje, poemas de Dios, 1964 by Josefina Guevara Castañeira; audio
- Edmundo Disdier interpreta a Edmundo Disdier, 1973 by Edmundo Disdier; audio

== Chapters ==
=== Collegiate chapters ===
Following is a list of Phi Eta Mu collegiate chapters, with active chapters indicated in bold and inactive chapters are in italics.

Chapter	Charter date	Institution	Location	Status	Ref.
**Alpha**	December 17, 1923	University of Puerto Rico, Río Piedras Campus	San Juan, Puerto Rico	Active	
**Beta**	1925	University of Puerto Rico at Mayagüez	Mayagüez, Puerto Rico	Active	
Gamma	1930	Louisiana State University	Baton Rouge, Louisiana	Inactive	
**Delta**			Florida	Active	
**Epsilon**	1968		Arecibo, Puerto Rico	Active	
**Eta**	1957		Ponce, Puerto Rico	Active	
Kappa	1981		Dominican Republic	Inactive	
Lambda			Ponce, Puerto Rico	Inactive	
**Omicron**	1957		San Germán, Puerto Rico	Active	

=== Graduate chapters ===
Following is a list of Phi Eta Mu graduate chapters, with active chapters indicated in bold and inactive chapters in inactive.

Chapter	Charter date	Location	Status	Ref.
Adrian Hilera		Ponce, Puerto Rico	Active	
Guayama		Guayama, Puerto Rico	Active	
Isaiah M. Crespo		Arecibo, Puerto Rico	Active	
Jorge Matos Postigo		Miami, Florida	Active	
José “Pepín” Villares		Caguas, Puerto Rico	Active	
Luis D. Miranda	1993	Orlando, Florida	Active	
Pedro Pascual Vivoni		San Germán, Puerto Rico	Active	
Pelayo Roman Benitez		Guaynabo, Puerto Rico	Active	
Rafael “Pepín” Justiniano		Mayagüez, Puerto Rico	Active	
Rafael Pérez Balzac		San Juan, Puerto Rico	Active	
Santiago “Quelo” Vivaldi		Yauco, Puerto Rico	Active	
Sergio Bauza Rivera		Washington, D.C.	Active	
Wilson P. Colberg	1960	Cabo Rojo, Puerto Rico	Active	
Texas		Texas	Active	

== See also ==
- List of social fraternities
- List of fraternities and sororities in Puerto Rico
