= Phi Delta Gamma (social) =

Puerto Rican fraternity

- ΦΔΓ
- Founded: April 25, 1942; 84 years ago University of Puerto Rico at Mayagüez
- Type: Social
- Affiliation: CIPR; CIPFI
- Status: Active
- Scope: National
- Chapters: 13
- Nickname: la Phi Delta
- Headquarters: 867 Av. Luis Muñoz Rivera Suite D-104; San Juan, Puerto Rico 00925; United States
- Website: phideltagammapr.org

Phi Delta Gamma (ΦΔΓ) of Puerto Rico is the first Puerto Rican organization of Greek letters, which was founded in the western town of Mayagüez, on April 25, 1942.

== History ==
Phi Delta Gamma originated from a high school fraternity, Alpha Iota Omega, which was founded in 1939. When the brothers of Alpha Iota Omega enrolled in the College of Agriculture and Mechanic Arts (Colegio de Agricultura y Artes Mecánicas) of Mayagüez, some were offered the opportunity to pledge one of the original Puerto Rican fraternities. The others reunited in the house of the brothers Gilberto Oliver Padilla and Otis Oliver Padilla. They decided to found a new fraternity on April 25, 1942, and to use the Greek letters Phi, Delta and Gamma.

The founding brothers are Gilberto Oliver Padilla, Otis Oliver Padilla, Raúl Romaguera, Ramón Antonio Frontera, Ignacio Beauchamp, José Ramón Ponce de León, Hilton Quintana, Angel Inserni, Rafael Ferrer Monge “El Cubano” (who also developed the shield, the first rulebook, and the motto of the fraternity), Rubén D’Acosta, Edgardo Olivencia, César Arana and Hernán Rodríguez.

These brothers established the first chapter as Alpha in Mayagüez. They had plans to expand the fraternity to all of Puerto Rico. In 1944, the first Phi Delta Gamma clubhouse was established in the Méndez Vigo street of Mayagüez.

In 1945, brother Otis Oliver commended to students Juan Mari Brás and Manuel Portela Lomba to take the Phi Delta Gamma fraternity to San Juan. They began the task of establishing the Beta chapter in the University of Puerto Rico in Río Piedras. Some of the founding brothers of the Beta chapter are Oscar Colón, Juan Mari Brás, Jean García, Ramón Vargas, Manuel Portela Lomba and Angel Amézaga. Thanks to this effort, the first convention of the Phi Delta Gamma was celebrated in 1945, in the Condado Hotel.

The Phi Delta Gamma members are known as "the originals", because they changed the way a traditional fraternity ought to be; also, they were the first Greek letter fraternity, which originated in western Puerto Rico: town of Mayagüez. The Phi Deltas are renowned for their friendliness and honesty. Above all, the great brotherhood among its members is very characteristic of their family activities (which involve grandparents, parents, spouses, children, grandchildren, and even great-grandchildren).

By July 1964, it had joined the Concilio Interfraternitario de Puerto Rico.

== Chapters ==
=== Collegiate chapters ===
Following is a list of Phi Delta Gamma collegiate chapters. Active chapters are indicated in bold. Inactive chapters are in italics.

Chapter	Charter date	Institution	Location	Ref.
Alpha	April 25, 1942	College of Agriculture and Mechanic Arts	Mayagüez, Puerto Rico	
Beta	1945	University of Puerto Rico in Río Piedras	San Juan, Puerto Rico	
Gamma	1948		Bayamón, Puerto Rico	
Delta	1952	Pontifical Catholic University of Puerto Rico	Ponce, Puerto Rico	
Epsilon	1954		Mayaguez, Puerto Rico	
Omega	1957	Interamerican University, San Germán Campus	San Germán, Puerto Rico	
Sigma	1957		Ponce, Puerto Rico	
Phi	1959	University of Puerto Rico Medical Sciences Campus	San Juan, Puerto Rico	
Tau	1966		Caguas, Puerto Rico	
Omicron	1966		Arecibo, Puerto Rico	
Nu	1968		Guaynabo, Puerto Rico	
Upsilon				
Chi				
Psi	1985			
Rho		University of Puerto Rico at Aguadilla	Aguadilla, Puerto Rico	
Zeta	1972	University of Puerto Rico at Arecibo	Arecibo, Puerto Rico	
Tau Xi				
Theta Mu				

=== Alumni chapters ===
Following is a list of Phi Delta Gamma alumni chapters. Active chapters are indicated in bold. Inactive chapters are in italics.

Chapter	Charter date	Location	Ref.
**Beta Alpha**	1992	Miami, Florida	
**Beta Beta**	2000	Orlando, Florida	
**Beta Delta**	2019	Tampa, Florida	
**Delta Xi**	2021	Washington, D.C.	

== Notable members ==
Name	Chapter	Notability	Ref.
Juan Mari Brás	Beta	Political candidate for governor and founder of the Puerto Rican Socialist Party	
Tito Lara		Singer	
Jose F. Ortiz Vazquez		Chief executive officer of Puerto Rico Aqueduct and Sewer Authority	
Luisito Vigoreaux		Television actor and producer	

== See also ==
- List of social fraternities and sororities
