= Concilio Interfraternitario de Puerto Rico =

Umbrella organization for Puerto Rican fraternities

- CIPR
- Founded: November 1957; 68 years ago Cupey Alto, Rio Piedras, Puerto Rico
- Type: Umbrella
- Affiliation: Independent
- Status: Active
- Emphasis: Puerto Rican Collegiate fraternities
- Scope: Regional
- Chapters: 7; 5 fraternities, 2 sororities
- Headquarters: , Puerto Rico; United States

The Concilio Interfraternitario de Puerto Rico or "Interfraternity Council of Puerto Rico" is an umbrella council for the seven oldest Puerto Rican fraternities and sororities.

== History ==
In November 1957, representatives of the fraternities Phi Eta Mu, Phi Sigma Alpha, and Nu Sigma Beta met at the latter's clubhouse in Cupey Alto, Rio Piedras, Puerto Rico to found a Greek letter umbrella organization. That meeting created Concilio Interfraternitario de Puerto Rico.

By July 1964, Alpha Beta Chi and Phi Delta Gamma had joined Concilio Interfraternitario de Puerto Rico as well. As of 2024, the two oldest sororities in Puerto Rico, Mu Alpha Phi and Eta Gamma Delta, are also members.

== Ideals and Objectives ==
On August 29 and 30 of 1958, a congress was held with activities in the headquarters of all three original organizations in San Juan, Puerto Rico.

The congress established that the ideals of the CIPR were: “To recognize brotherhood amongst men with the aim of achieving mutual understanding, tolerance and respect; to put into practice the ideals of brotherhood and selfless friendship, thus eliminating the barriers of harm between men; to promote the development of moral values and the ideal of service in man”. The objectives for the organization were established in the congress to be: To foster cooperation, understanding and identification among the fraternities of university origin so that the ideal of fraternity is extended to a more encompassing field. To channel the activities of the fraternities that make up the council in a common effort aimed at carrying out civic, cultural, social and sports efforts that will benefit the community. To establish uniformity in the regulations of the fraternities that make up this council, in matters of pledges and initiation practices, as well as other aspects in which this would be of common benefit to all fraternities.

== See also ==
- Puerto Rican fraternities and sororities
