= Alpha Beta Chi =

Puerto Rican fraternity

- ΑΒΧ
- Founded: 1941; 85 years ago University of Puerto Rico, Rio Piedras Campus
- Type: Social
- Affiliation: CIPR; CIPFI
- Status: Active
- Scope: National
- Pillars: Love, Honor, and Loyalty
- Colors: Black & White
- Chapters: 3 active collegiate 9 active alumni
- Headquarters: 97 Calle Agua Azul - Urb. Costa Norte; Hatillo, Puerto Rico 00659-2761; United States
- Website: www.abxpr.com

Alpha Beta Chi (ΑΒΧ) is a fraternity founded in Puerto Rico in 1941. It has established at least seven student chapters since its establishment at the University of Puerto Rico, Rio Piedras Campus. It also has alumni chapters across Puerto Rico and in Florida.

== History ==
Alpha Beta Chi was established as ABC at the University of Puerto Rico, Rio Piedras Campus in 1941 by Ricardo Alegria who had been a member of Nu Sigma Beta. Its founding members were:

- Ricardo Alegria
- Jose A. "Chinche" Benitez
- George Bothwell
- Jose Luis Figueroa
- Jaime Garcia Blanco
- Johnny Gonzalez
- Jose "Pirulo" Hernandez
- Jose Ledesma
- Roberto Todd
- Jose A. Villanueva

ABC was established to "defend authentic culture, education, and help the people of Puerto Rico". Later, it changed to the Greek letter name Alpha Beta Chi.

The fraternity established Beta chapter at the College of Agriculture and Mechanical Arts in 1942. It was the first collegiate in Puerto Rico to attempt to establich a high school chapter at Central High School. Other chapters followed at various colleges in Puerto Rico. By July 1964, it had joined the Concilio Interfraternitario de Puerto Rico.

In 2014, the fraternity created the Ricardo Alegría Gallardo Award, presented to a high school graduate who is studying the fine arts. Later, it established the Carmen Ana Pons Castañer Award, named after Alegría's widow, for award for graduates of middle school with fine arts programs.

The fraternity's headquarters are located at 97 Calle Agua Azul - Urb. Costa Norte in Hatillo, Puerto Rico. The fraternity also has a clubhouse in Guaynabo.

== Symbols ==
The fraternity's principles or pillars are Love, Honor, and Loyalty. Instead of using a crest or coat of arms, it adopted a Taino emblem. The emblem was based on a drawing found in a cave in Lares.

== Chapters ==
| Chapter | Charter date | Institution | Location | Status | Ref. |
|---|---|---|---|---|---|
| Alpha (First) | 1941 | University of Puerto Rico, Rio Piedras Campus | San Juan, Puerto Rico | Moved | |
| Alpha | | Polytechnic University of Puerto Rico | San Juan, Puerto Rico | Active | |
| Alpha | | Interamerican University of Puerto Rico, San Juan campus | San Juan, Puerto Rico | Active | |
| Beta | 1942 | University of Puerto Rico at Mayagüez | Mayagüez, Puerto Rico | Active | (Note: The chapter was established at the College of Agriculture and Mechanical Arts, now called the University of Puerto Rico at Mayagüez.) |
| Gamma (First) | August 1942 | Central High School | Santurce, San Juan, Puerto Rico | Inactive, Reassigned | |
| Delta (First) | 1943–19xx ? | Polytechnic Institute of Puerto Rico | San Germán, Puerto Rico | Reestablished, Reassigned | (Note: The chapter was established at Polytechnic Institute of Puerto Rico, now called the Interamerican University of Puerto Rico. After going inactive, the Delta chapter was re-established as the Gamma chapter.) |
| Gamma | 1958 | Interamerican University of Puerto Rico | San Germán, Puerto Rico | Active | |
| Delta | 1958 | Pontifical Catholic University of Puerto Rico | Ponce, Puerto Rico | Active | (Note: The chapter formed at the Catholic University of Ponce, now the Pontifical Catholic University of Puerto Rico.) |
| Epsilon | 19xx ? | Alumni chapter | Puerto Rico | Moved | (Note: Chapter was converted in the fraternity's Alumni Zones) |
| Kappa | 19xx ? | Alumni chapter | New York City, New York | Inactive | |
| Eternal | | | | Memorial | |

== Alumni chapters ==
Originally, Alpha Beta Chi established Epsilon chapter for alumni. In 1961, the Epsilon chapter authorized the creation of local alumni chapters. The first local alumni chapter was created in Mayaguez in 1961. Eventually, alumni chapters were established in various locations throughout Puerto Rico. However, this system was replaced with the current Alumni Zonas or areas. In the following list, active chapters are indicateds in bold and inactive chapters are in italics.

| Zona | Charter date | Location | Status | Ref. |
|---|---|---|---|---|
| **Coayuco** | 1951 | Yauco, Puerto Rico | Active | (Note: Was the Yauco alumni chapter (Zona Yauco)) |
| **Yahueca** | 1961 | Mayaguez, Puerto Rico | Active | (Note: Was originally the Mayaguez alumni chapter (Zona Mayaguez)) |
| **Guainí** | 1961 | Ponce, Puerto, Rico | Active | (Note: Was originally the Ponce alumni chapter (Zona Ponce)) |
| Guaynabo | 1960s | Guaynabo, Puerto Rico | Inactive | |
| **Borinquen** | mid 1960s–19xx?; 1970s | Guaynabo, Puerto Rico | Active | (Note: Was originally the Río Piedras alumni chapter (Zona Río Piedras)) |
| **Majagua** | 1965–19xx ?; 2009 | Bayamón, Puerto Rico | Active | (Note: Was originally the Bayamón alumni chapter (Zona Bayamón)) |
| **Porta Coeli** | 1974 | San German, Puerto Rico | Active | (Note: Was the San Germán alumni chapter (Zona San Germán)) |
| Jumacao | 19xx ? | Humacao, Puerto Rico | Inactive | (Note: Was the Humacao alumni chapter (Zona Humacao)) |
| **Taina** | 1986 | Miami, Florida | Active | |
| **Yaholo** | 1991 | Orlando, Florida | Active | |
| **Agueybana** | 2008 | Tampa, Florida | Active | |

== Notable members ==
- Ricardo Alegria (Alpha, 1941), scholar, cultural anthropologist, and archaeologist known as the "father of modern Puerto Rican archaeology"

== See also ==
- List of social fraternities and sororities
- List of fraternities and sororities in Puerto Rico
