= List of Lambda Upsilon Lambda chapters =

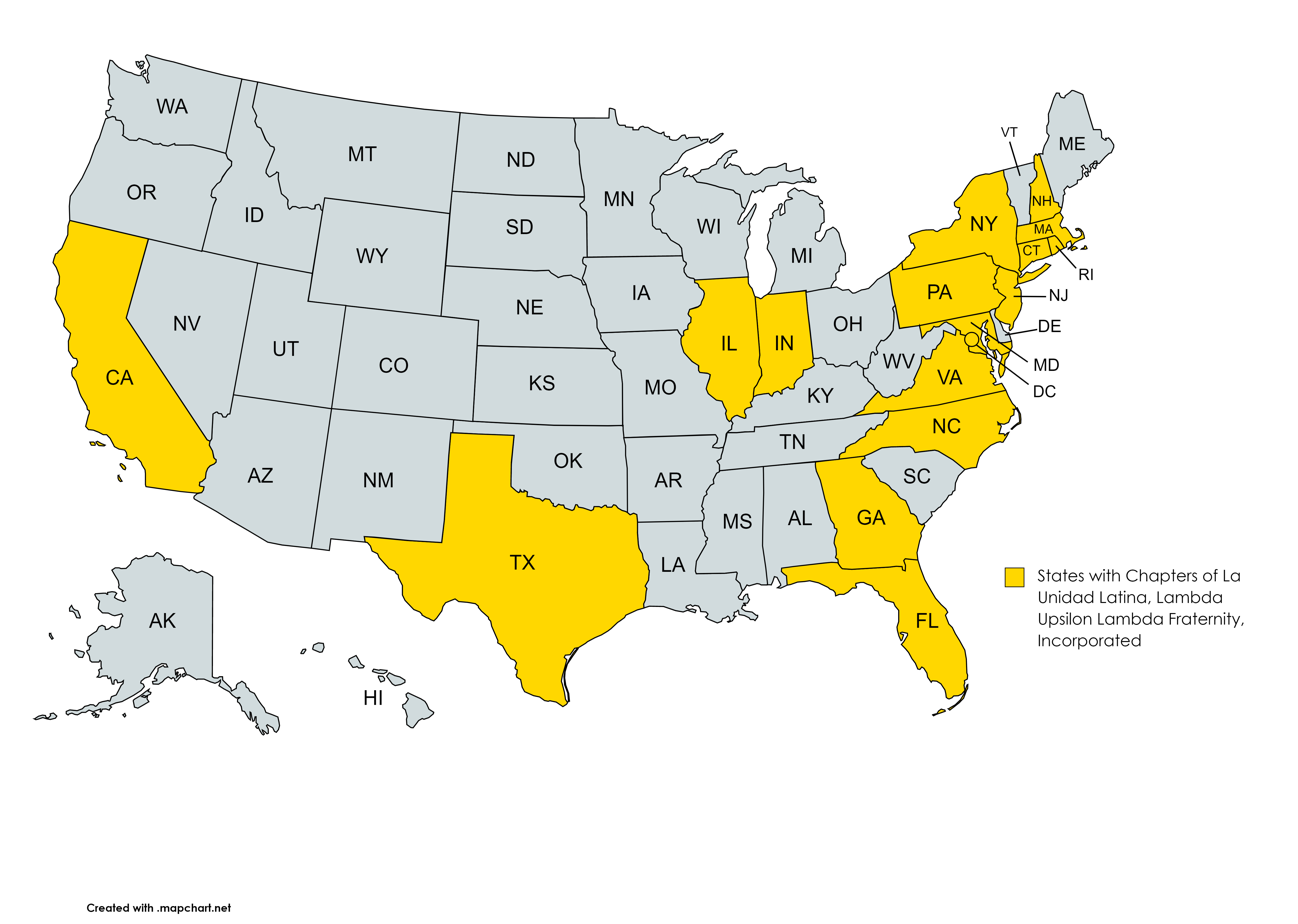
States with chartered chapters of Lambda Upsilon Lambda

Lambda Upsilon Lambda or La Unidad Latina has 85 undergraduate chapters and 19 graduate/professional chapters across 119 campuses and various metropolitan areas. The first undergraduate chapter was founded in Cornell University on February 19, 1982. Meanwhile, the first graduate/professional chapter was established in Rensselaer Polytechnic Institute on November 14, 1998. The honorary Pi Sigma chapter is reserved for deceased members of the fraternity.

== Naming convention ==
Greek-lettered chapters of Lambda Upsilon Lambda are given names consisting of either one or two Greek letters after successfully transitioning from provisional chapter status. The names are issued in order according to the dates on which the chapters are transitioned from their provisional phase. Alpha is the name given to the founding chapter at Cornell University, followed by Beta at Binghamton University for the second chapter, and so on in the Greek alphabet. Chapters beginning with the Greek letter Gamma are reserved for graduate alumni professional chapters, with the first being the Gamma Alpha chapter based in New York City.

Once the Greek alphabet had been exhausted by using single letters at the undergraduate level except Gamma, two-letter names began to be issued except the combination of Pi Sigma and any combination starting with Gamma, starting with Alpha Alpha, then Alpha Beta, then Alpha Gamma, etc. The honorary Pi Sigma chapter and its Greek letter combination, as a result, is reserved for deceased brothers of Lambda Upsilon Lambda due to it having the same starting letters with the latter two words of the fraternity's motto "La Unidad Para Siempre".

== Undergraduate chapters ==
In the following list, active chapters are indicated in bold and inactive chapters are in italics.

Chapter	Charter date and range	Institution	Location	Status	Ref.
**Alpha**	1982	Cornell University	Ithaca, New York	Active	
**Alpha**	1982	Ithaca College	Ithaca, New York	Active	(Note: This chapter is not recognized on campus due to the 1980 ban on Greek organizations.)
**Beta**	1985	Binghamton University	Binghamton, New York	Active	
**Delta**	1988	Drexel University	Philadelphia, Pennsylvania	Active	
**Delta**	1988	University of Pennsylvania	Philadelphia, Pennsylvania	Active	
**Delta**	1988	Temple University	Philadelphia, Pennsylvania	Active	
**Delta**	1988	Haverford College	Haverford, Pennsylvania	Active	
Epsilon	1988–2018	Buffalo State College	Buffalo, New York	Dormant	(Note: National revoked this chapter's charter in 2018. Decision was later reversed in 2024.)
Epsilon	1994–2018	SUNY Buffalo	Buffalo, New York	Dormant	(Note: National revoked this chapter's charter in 2018. Decision was later reversed in 2024.)
Epsilon	1994–2018	Canisius University	Buffalo, New York	Dormant	(Note: National revoked this chapter's charter in 2018. Decision was later reversed in 2024.)
Epsilon	1994–2018	Daemen University	Amherst, New York	Dormant	(Note: National revoked this chapter's charter in 2018. Decision was later reversed in 2024.)
Epsilon	1994–2018	D'Youville University	Buffalo, New York	Dormant	(Note: National revoked this chapter's charter in 2018. Decision was later reversed in 2024.)
**Zeta**	1989	Rhode Island College	Providence, Rhode Island	Active	
**Zeta**	1989	Brown University	Providence, Rhode Island	Dormant	
**Zeta**	1989	Bryant University	Smithfield, Rhode Island	Dormant	
**Zeta**	1989	Providence College	Providence, Rhode Island	Dormant	
**Eta**	1991	University at Albany, SUNY	Albany, New York	Active	
**Theta**	1991	Syracuse University	Syracuse, New York	Active	
**Iota**	1991	Rutgers University–New Brunswick	New Brunswick, New Jersey	Active	
**Kappa**	1992	Yale University	New Haven, Connecticut	Active	
Lambda	1992–20xx ?	Long Island University at C. W. Post	Brookville, New York	Dormant	
Mu	1992–20xx ?	University of Rhode Island	Kingston, Rhode Island	Dormant	
**Nu**	1994	Boston College	Chestnut Hill, Massachusetts	Active	
**Nu**	1994	Harvard College	Cambridge, Massachusetts	Active	
**Nu**	1994	Massachusetts Institute of Technology	Cambridge, Massachusetts	Active	
**Nu**	1994	Tufts University	Medford and Somerville, Massachusetts	Active	
**Nu**	1994	Northeastern University	Boston, Massachusetts	Active	
Xi	1994–20xx ?	Princeton University	Princeton, New Jersey	Dormant	
Xi	1994–20xx ?	Rider University	Lawrence Township, New Jeresey	Dormant	
**Omicron**	1994	New York University	New York City, New York	Active	
**Pi**	1995	State University of New York at New Paltz	New Paltz, New York	Active	
**Rho**	1995	Duke University	Durham, North Carolina	Active	
**Sigma**	1995	Wesleyan University	Middletown, Connecticut	Active	
**Tau**	1995–xxxx, 2013	New Jersey Institute of Technology	Newark, New Jersey	Active	(Note: Re-founded as the Beta Rho chapter in 2013.)
**Tau**	1995	Rutgers University–Newark	Newark, New Jersey	Active	
**Upsilon**	1995	Stony Brook University	Stony Brook, New York	Active	
**Phi**	1995	University of Maryland, College Park	College Park, Maryland	Active	
**Phi**	2004	Johns Hopkins University	Baltimore, Maryland	Active	
Chi	1997–20xx ?	Georgetown University	Washington, D.C.	Dormant	
Chi	1997–20xx ?	George Washington University	Washington, D.C.	Dormant	
Chi	1997–20xx ?	American University	Washington, D.C.	Dormant	
Psi	1997–20xx ?	Dartmouth College	Hanover, New Hampshire	Dormant	
**Omega**	1997	Nazareth University	Pittsford, New York	Active	
**Omega**	1997	Rochester Institute of Technology	Henrietta, New York	Active	
**Omega**	1997	St. John Fisher University	Pittsford, New York	Active	
**Omega**	1997	University of Rochester	Rochester, New York	Active	
**Alpha Alpha**	1997	Stevens Institute of Technology	Hoboken, New Jersey	Active	
Alpha Beta	1998–20xx ?	University of Massachusetts Amherst	Amherst, Massachusetts	Dormant	
Alpha Gamma	1999–20xx ?	Rensselaer Polytechnic Institute	Troy, New York	Dormant	
**Alpha Delta**	1999	George Mason University	Fairfax, Virginia	Active	
**Alpha Epsilon**	1999	University of Virginia	Charlottesville, Virginia	Active	(Note: Chapter originally had a dual charter at both the University of Virginia and Virginia Commonwealth University. The latter institution later received its own independent charter as colony in 2008 and then as a fully-fledged chapter in 2009.)
Alpha Zeta	2001–20xx ?	Columbia College Chicago	Chicago, Illinois	Dormant	
Alpha Zeta	2001–20xx ?	DePaul University	Chicago, Illinois	Dormant	
Alpha Zeta	2001–20xx ?	Loyola University Chicago	Chicago, Illinois	Dormant	
Alpha Zeta	2001–20xx ?	University of Chicago	Chicago, Illinois	Dormant	
**Alpha Eta**	2000	Columbia University	New York City, New York	Active	
**Alpha Eta**	2000	Fordham University	New York City, New York	Active	
**Alpha Eta**	2000	John Jay College of Criminal Justice	New York City, New York	Active	
Alpha Theta	2001–20xx ?	Our Lady of the Lake University	San Antonio, Texas	Dormant	
Alpha Theta	2001–20xx ?	Texas State University	San Marcos, Texas	Dormant	
**Alpha Iota**	2001	University of North Carolina at Chapel Hill	Chapel Hill, North Carolina	Active	
**Alpha Kappa**	2002	Montclair State University	Montclair, New Jersey	Active	
Alpha Lambda	2006–20xx ?	St. John's University (New York City)	Queens, New York City, New York	Dormant	
Alpha Mu	2002–20xx ?	State University of New York at Oswego	Oswego, New York	Dormant	
**Alpha Nu**	2003	Seton Hall University	South Orange, New Jersey	Active	
**Alpha Xi**	2003	Indiana University Bloomington	Bloomington, Indiana	Active	
**Alpha Omicron**	2003	James Madison University	Harrisonburg, Virginia	Active	
Alpha Pi	2004–20xx ?	Ramapo College	Mahwah, New Jersey	Dormant	
**Alpha Rho**	2004	Florida International University	Miami, Florida	Active	
**Alpha Sigma**	2004	Georgia Institute of Technology	Atlanta, Georgia	Active	
Alpha Tau	2004–20xx ?	Hamilton College	Clinton, New York	Dormant	
Alpha Upsilon	2006–20xx ?	Hofstra University	Nassau County, New York	Dormant	
**Alpha Phi**	2006	University of Southern California	Los Angeles, California	Active	
**Alpha Chi**	2006	University of Illinois Urbana-Champaign	Champaign, Illinois	Active	
Alpha Psi	2009–20xx ?	Virginia Commonwealth University	Richmond, Virginia	Dormant	(Note: Chapter members were originally part of a dual charter at both Virginia Commonwealth University and the University of Virginia that was granted in 1999. The former institution later received its own independent charter as colony in 2008 and then as a fully-fledged chapter in 2009.)
**Alpha Omega**	2007	William Paterson University	Wayne, New Jersey	Active	
**Beta Alpha**	2009	Old Dominion University	Norfolk, Virginia	Active	
Beta Beta	2009–20xx ?	Baruch College	New York City, New York	Dormant	
**Beta Gamma**	2009	Pace University	New York City, New York	Active	
**Beta Delta**	2009	University of South Florida	Tampa, Florida	Active	
**Beta Epsilon**	2010	Georgia State University	Atlanta, Georgia	Active	
Beta Zeta	2011–20xx ?	Johnson & Wales University	Providence, Rhode Island	Dormant	
**Beta Eta**	2011	University of California, Berkeley	Berkeley, California	Active	
**Beta Theta**	2007	State University of New York at Cortland	Cortland, New York	Active	
**Beta Iota**	2009	University of Connecticut	Storrs, Connecticut	Active	
Beta Kappa	2011–20xx ?	University of Illinois Chicago	Chicago, Illinois	Dormant	
**Beta Lambda**	2012	Adelphi University	Garden City, New York	Active	
**Beta Mu**	2010	Northern Illinois University	DeKalb, Illinois	Active	
**Beta Nu**	2012	Indiana University Indianapolis	Indianapolis, Indiana	Active	(Note: Chapter was formed at Indiana University–Purdue University Indianapolis which split into Indiana University Indianapolis and Purdue University in Indianapolis in 2024.)
Beta Xi	1992–20xx ?	State University of New York at Old Westbury	Long Island, New York	Dormant	
**Beta Omicron**	2013	Northwestern University	Evanston, Illinois	Active	
**Beta Pi**	2012	Villanova University	Philadelphia, Pennsylvania	Active	
**Beta Rho**	2013	New Jersey Institute of Technology	Newark, New Jersey	Active	(Note: Re-founded as the Beta Rho chapter in 2013 although originally a part of the Tau Chapter.)
Beta Sigma	2016–20xx ?	State University of New York at Plattsburgh	Plattsburgh, New York	Dormant	(Note: Founded as a colony/provisional chapter in April 2010.)
**Beta Tau**	2019	University of Georgia	Athens, Georgia	Active	
**Beta Upsilon**	2017	Florida Gulf Coast University	Fort Myers, Florida	Active	
**Beta Phi**	2017	University of North Carolina at Charlotte	Charlotte, North Carolina	Active	
**Beta Chi**	2019	Elon University	Elon, North Carolina	Active	
**Beta Psi**	2022	University of California, Los Angeles	Los Angeles, California	Active	
**Beta Omega**	2018	Rowan University	Glassboro, New Jersey	Active	
**Delta Alpha**	2019	The College of New Jersey	Ewing Township, New Jersey	Active	
**Delta Beta**	2019	Kennesaw State University	Cobb County, Georgia	Active	
**Delta Gamma**	2017	Kean University	Union and Hillside, New Jersey	Active	
**Delta Delta**	2016	Virginia Tech	Blacksburg, Virginia	Active	
**Delta Epsilon**	2024	University of California, Irvine	Irvine, California	Active	(Note: Colony formed in 2024.)
**Delta Zeta**	2025	University of San Diego	San Diego, California	Active	
**Delta Eta**	2025	Chapman University	Orange, California	Active	
**Delta Theta**	2025	Purdue University	West Lafayette, Indiana	Active	
**Pi Sigma**				Memorial	
Indiana State University Provisional	2017	Indiana State University	Terre Haute, IN	Dormant	
**University of Texas at Austin Provisional**	2023	University of Texas at Austin	Austin, Texas	Active	(Note: Founded as a colony in 2022 and became a provisional chapter in 2023.)
**College of William and Mary Provisional Chapter**	2026	College of William and Mary	Williamsburg, Virginia	Active	
**University of North Florida Provisional Chapter**	2026	University of North Florida	Jacksonville, Florida	Active	(Note: Colony formed in 2025.)
**Washington & Lee University Provisional Chapter**	2026	Washington & Lee University	Lexington, Virginia	Active	(Note: Colony formed in 2026.)
**Emory University Provisional Chapter**	2026	Emory University	Atlanta, GA	Active	(Note: Received approval for colonization at Emory University in October 2013 and was supposed to become a member chapter of the university's Multicultural Greek Council in fall 2015 but its invitation was rescinded. Decision was reversed in 2024.)
**Florida State University Colony**	2013	Florida State University	Tallahassee, FL	Active	(Note: Colony formed in 2013.)
**University of Central Florida Colony**	2020	University of Central Florida	Orlando, Florida	Active	(Note: Colony formed in 2020)
**High Point University Colony**	2023	High Point University	High Point, North Carolina	Active	(Note: Colony formed in 2023.)
**Towson University Colony**	2025	Towson University	Towson, Maryland	Active	(Note: Colony formed in 2025.)
**North Carolina State University Colony**	2025	North Carolina State University	Raleigh, North Carolina	Active	(Note: Colony formed in 2025.)

== Graduate alumni professional chapters ==
Following are the graduate alumni professional chapters of Lambda Upsilon Lambda. Active chapters are indicated in bold. Inactive chapters are indicated in italics.

Chapter	Charter date and range	Location	Status	Ref.
Gamma Alpha	1990	New York, New York	Active	
Gamma Beta	1993	Philadelphia, Pennsylvania	Active	
Gamma Gamma	1993	Buffalo, New York	Active	
Gamma Delta	1993	Providence, Rhode Island	Active	
Gamma Epsilon	1997	Washington, D.C.	Active	
Gamma Zeta	1999	Chicago, Illinois	Active	
Gamma Eta	1999	Jersey City, New Jersey	Active	
Gamma Theta	1999	Austin, Texas	Active	
Gamma Iota	2000	Los Angeles, California	Active	
Gamma Kappa	2000	Miami, Florida	Active	
Gamma Lambda	2001	Long Island, New York	Active	
Gamma Mu	2001	Atlanta, Georgia	Active	
Gamma Nu	2004	Orlando, Florida	Active	
Gamma Xi	2009	Albany, New York	Active	
Gamma Omicron	2020	Boston, Massachusetts	Active	
Gamma Pi	2024	Charlotte, North Carolina	Active	
Gamma Rho	2025	Hartford, Connecticut	Active	
Indianapolis Provisional	2026	Indianapolis, Indiana	Active	
Dallas–Fort Worth Provisional	2026	Dallas–Fort Worth, Texas	Active	
Alumni Association in Seattle, WA	2018	Seattle, Washington	Active	
