= List of Lambda Sigma Upsilon chapters =

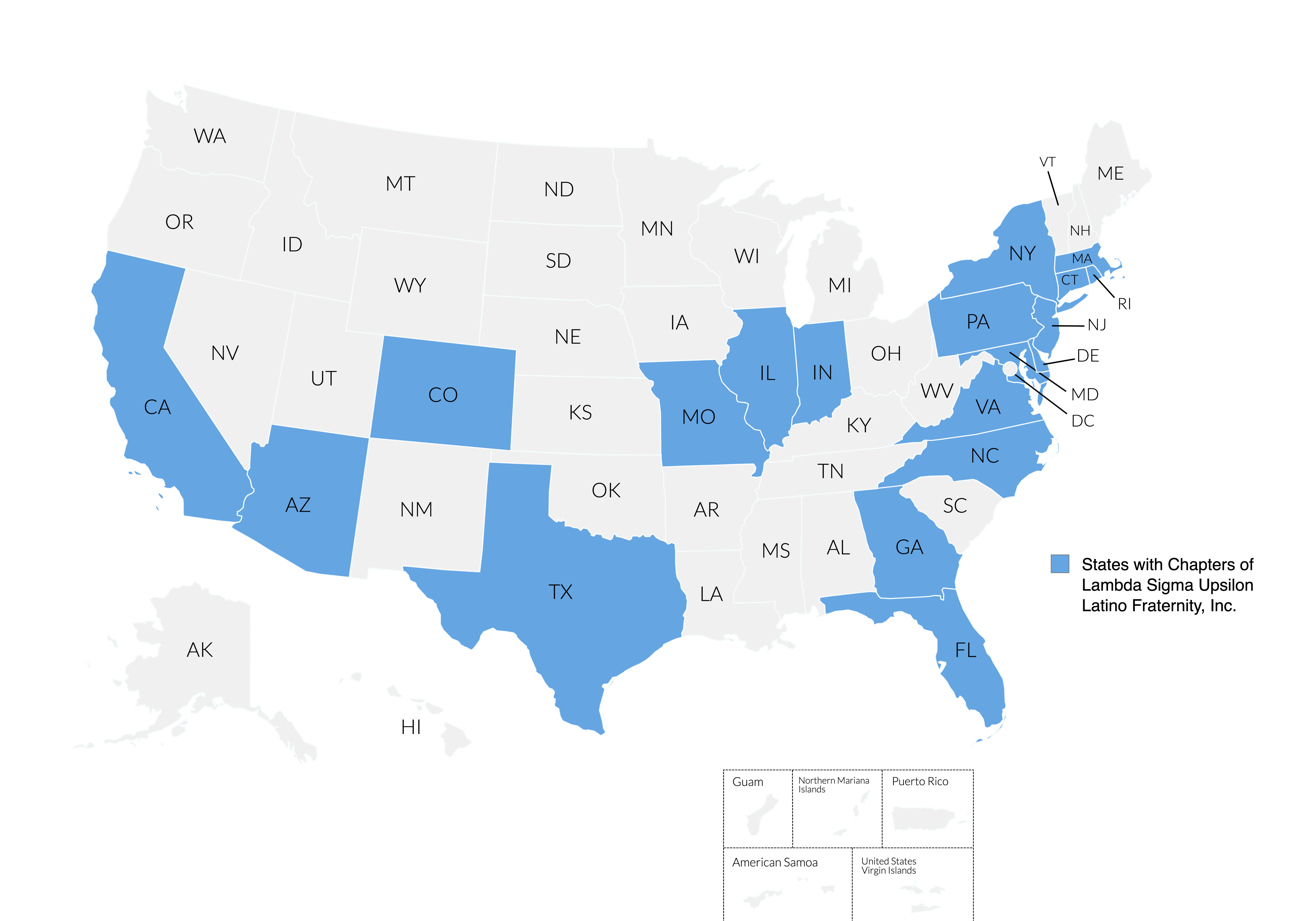
Blue indicates states with chapters

Lambda Sigma Upsilon is an American historically Latino national college fraternity. The fraternity established its first chapter, the Taino chapter, on April 5, 1979, at Rutgers University–New Brunswick Livingston Campus in Piscataway, New Jersey. In addition to its undergraduate chapters at colleges and universities across the United States, Lambda Sigma Upsilon also chapter alumni chapters and alumni assocaitions for graduate and professional members which are typically state-wide groups.

== Undergraduate chapters ==
In the following list of undergraduate chapters, active chapters are indicated in bold and inactive chapters are in italics.

Number	Chapter	Charter date and range	Institution	Location	Status	Ref.
1	**Taino**	April 5, 1979	Rutgers University–New Brunswick Livingston Campus	Piscataway, New Jersey	Active	
2	**Azteca**	April 3, 1982	William Paterson University	Wayne, New Jersey	Active	
3	**Zulu**	May 6, 1983	Stockton University	Galloway Township, New Jersey	Active	
4	**Monarca**	April 4, 1984	Montclair State University	Montclair, New Jersey	Active	
5	**Pioneros**	December 13, 1986	New Jersey Institute of Technology	Newark, New Jersey	Active	
5	**Pioneros**	December 13, 1986	Rutgers University–Newark	Newark, New Jersey	Active	
6	**Emperadores**	December 15, 1990	Kean University	Union, New Jersey	Active	
7	**Resistentes**	April 18, 1991	Ramapo College	Mahwah, New Jersey	Active	
8	**Almirantes**	April 18, 1991	Seton Hall University	South Orange, New Jersey	Active	
9	**Areyto**	November 28, 1993	Kean Jersey City (formerly New Jersey City University)	Jersey City, New Jersey	Active	
10	Tikal	April 2, 1995 – 2021	Bloomsburg University of Pennsylvania	Bloomsburg, Pennsylvania	Inactive	(Note: The banned all fraternities and sororities in 2021.)
11	**Intocables**	April 14, 1995	Bloomfield College of Montclair State University	Bloomfield, New Jersey	Active	
12	Diamante	December 11, 1997 – 20xx ?	The College of New Jersey	Ewing, New Jersey	Inactive	
13	Mexica	May 19, 1999 – 20xx ?	Princeton University	Princeton, New Jersey	Inactive	
14	**Ciguayo**	April 1, 2000	Fairleigh Dickinson University, Teaneck	Teaneck, New Jersey	Active	
15	Andes	July 21, 2000 – 20xx ?	Saint Peter's University	Jersey City, New Jersey	Inactive	
16	**Xaragua**	November 14, 2000	Rowan University	Glassboro, New Jersey	Active	
17	Kogi	December 2, 2000 – 20xx ?	University of Miami	Coral Gables, Florida	Inactive	
18	Aphrike	February 22, 2001 – 20xx ?	Monmouth University	West Long Branch, New Jersey	Inactive	
19	Cayuga	March 4, 2001 – 20xx ?	Le Moyne College	Syracuse, New York	Inactive	
20	**Czar**	March 4, 2001 – 2017	University of Central Florida	Orlando, Florida	Active	
21	**Jaguar**	March 16, 2002	Lock Haven University of Pennsylvania	Lock Haven, Pennsylvania	Active	
22	Biaraku'	March 24, 2002	LIU Post	Brookville, New York	Inactive	
23	Seneca	April 6, 2002	Virginia Tech	Blacksburg, Virginia	Inactive	
24	**Mohegan**	April 25, 2002	Sacred Heart University	Fairfield, Connecticut	Active	
25	Tekesta	October 26, 2002	Florida Memorial University	Miami Gardens, Florida	Inactive	
26	Kyodrowe	November 9, 2002	University at Buffalo	Buffalo, New York	Inactive	
26	Kyodrowe	November 9, 2002	Buffalo State University	Buffalo, New York	Inactive	
27	**Guarionex**	March 28, 2003	State University of New York at New Paltz	New Paltz, New York	Active	
28	Cemi	April 4, 2003	University of Missouri	Columbia, Missouri	Inactive	
29	Terra	April 7, 2003	Johnson & Wales University	Miami, Florida	Inactive	
30	**Coba**	October 31, 2003	Kutztown University of Pennsylvania	Kutztown, Pennsylvania	Active	
31	Abakua	November 20, 2003	University of Bridgeport	Bridgeport, Connecticut	Inactive	
32	**Archias**	April 18, 2004	Syracuse University	Syracuse, New York	Active	
33	**Trovadores**	April 18, 2004	State University of New York at Old Westbury	Old Westbury, New York	Active	
34	Aztlan	March 26, 2005	Stephen F. Austin State University	Nacogdoches, Texas	Inactive	
35	Dakhil	April 15, 2005	Binghamton University	Vestal, New York	Inactive	
36	Qasid	April 1, 2006	University of Georgia	Athens, Georgia	Inactive	
37	Niantic	April 8, 2006	University of Rhode Island	Kingston, Rhode Island	Inactive	
38	Orinoco	April 8, 2006	Rider University	Lawrenceville, New Jersey	Inactive	
39	**Zawadi**	April 8, 2006	University of Delaware	Newark, Delaware	Active	
40	**Kahnianke**	April 15, 2006	State University of New York at Oneonta	Oneonta, New York	Active	
41	Tenochtitlan	November 17, 2006	University of Colorado Boulder	Boulder, Colorado	Inactive	
42	**Aquila**	December 1, 2007	University at Albany, SUNY	Albany, New York	Active	
43	Yucatán	March 22, 2008	Colorado School of Mines	Golden, Colorado	Inactive	
44	**Copan**	April 11, 2008	Millersville University of Pennsylvania	Millersville, Pennsylvania	Active	
45	Yukayeke	April 26, 2008	Southern Connecticut State University	New Haven, Connecticut	Inactive	
46	**Badachu**	May 1, 2008	Baruch College	New York City, New York	Active	
47	Marabou	August 1, 2008	Lynn University	Boca Raton, Florida	Inactive	
48	Qing	November 25, 2008	Florida Atlantic University	Boca Raton, Florida	Inactive	
49	**Uman**	April 18, 2009	Lehigh University	Bethlehem, Pennsylvania	Active	
50	**Onyota**	April 18, 2009	Utica University	Utica, New York	Active	
51	Serikon	April 25, 2009	University of South Florida	Tampa, Florida	Inactive	
52	Kalinago	April 29, 2009	Barry University	Miami Shores, Florida	Inactive	
53	Elysium	April 16, 2010	Georgia College & State University	Milledgeville, Georgia	Inactive	
54	**Alkimia**	April 24, 2010	Rochester Institute of Technology	Rochester, New York	Active	
55	**Lipan**	April 24, 2010	Colorado State University	Fort Collins, Colorado	Active	
56	**Wahati**	May 14, 2010	Arizona State University	Tempe, Arizona	Active	
57	Najem	November 10, 2010	St. John's University	Queens, New York	Inactive	
58	Seiryuu	April 10, 2011	State University of New York at Oswego	Oswego, New York	Inactive	
59	**Zikhari**	April 22, 2011	Pennsylvania State University	University Park, Pennsylvania	Active	
60	Pantheon	October 27, 2012	Abraham Baldwin Agricultural College	Tifton, Georgia	Inactive	
61	**Elegua**	November 10, 2012	DePauw University	Greencastle, Indiana	Active	
62	**Arcani**	November 26, 2012	University of Northern Colorado	Greeley, Colorado	Active	
63	Bajamaku	December 7, 2012	Wheelock College	Boston, Massachusetts	Inactive	
64	**Maguana**	November 8, 2013	East Stroudsburg University of Pennsylvania	East Stroudsburg, Pennsylvania	Active	
65	**Quirigua**	April 6, 2014	Indiana University of Pennsylvania	Indiana, Pennsylvania	Active	
66	Equitatus	November 1, 2014	State University of New York at Potsdam	Potsdam, New York	Inactive	
67	**Korones**	November 3, 2014	State University of New York at Cortland	Cortland, New York	Active	
68	**Himalayas**	November 18, 2016	Emory University	Atlanta, Georgia	Active	
69	**Valhalla**	April 7, 2017	Indiana University Bloomington	Bloomington, Indiana	Active	
70	**Zumidas**	April 15, 2017	University of Massachusetts Dartmouth	North Dartmouth, Massachusetts	Active	
71	U'Wa	April 7, 2018	Lycoming College	Williamsport, Pennsylvania	Inactive	
72	Daelos	April 13, 2018	Iona College	New Rochelle, New York	Inactive	
73	**Fukujin**	April 21, 2018	University of North Carolina at Charlotte	Charlotte, North Carolina	Active	(Note: Chapter was suspended through 2022 after allegations of underage drinking and hazing.)
74	**Taburasa**	November 16, 2018	State University of New York at Brockport	Brockport, New York	Active	
75	**Sacbe**	April 7, 2019	Appalachian State University	Boone, North Carolina	Active	
76	**Pángǔ**	April 12, 2019	Villanova University	Villanova, Pennsylvania	Active	
77	**Somali**	April 13, 2019	Rutgers University–Camden	Camden, New Jersey	Active	
78	**Waya**	April 18, 2020	Radford University	Radford, Virginia	Active	
79	**Deiconsentes**	April 20, 2020	University of Rochester	Rochester, New York	Active	
80	**Ixcalli**	March 25, 2021	Centenary University	Hackettstown, New Jersey	Active	
81	**Viracocha**	October 26, 2022	Stevens Institute of Technology	Hoboken, New Jersey	Active	
82	**Jo’arau**	November 16, 2023	University of Arizona	Tucson, Arizona	Active	
83	**Ameyalli**	March 8, 2025	University of California, Santa Barbara	Santa Barbara, California	Active	
84	**Kavari**	April 5, 2025	University of Massachusetts Amherst	Amherst, Massachusetts	Active	
85	**Torogoz**	March 27, 2026	University of Virginia	Charlottesville, Virginia	Active	
86	**Tawantin**	April 18, 2026	Salisbury University	Salisbury, Maryland	Active	
87	**Tulan**	April 25, 2026	University of Illinois Urbana-Champaign	Champaign, Illinois	Active	
88	**Kamasa**	October 17, 2026	Johns Hopkins University	Baltimore, Maryland	Active	
89	**Muwaar**	October 30, 2026	University of California, Los Angeles	Los Angeles, California	Active	
	**Coaybay**				Memorial	

== Alumni chapters and alumni associations ==
Following is a list of Lambda Sigma Upsilon's alumni chapters and alumni associations, with active chapters indicated in bold and inactive chapters in italics.

Chapter	Location	Status	Ref.
**Florida Alumni Association**	Florida	Active	
DC Metro Alumni Association	Washington, D.C.	Inactive	
GA Alumni Association	Georgia	Inactive	
**Ouranios Graduate/Professional Chapter**	New York statewide	Active	
**New York Alumni Association**	New York statewide	Active	
**Anasazi Graduate/Professional Chapter**	New Jersey statewide	Active	
**New Jersey Alumni Association**	New Jersey statewide	Active	
**Pennsylvania Alumni Association**	Pennsylvania statewide	Active	
**Delaware Alumni Association**	Delaware statewide	Active	
