= Alfreda Harris =

Former basketball coach (born 1938)

Alfreda Ramsey Harris
- Born: 1938 (age 87–88)

Alfreda Ramsey Harris is a former women's college basketball coach.

Harris is the founder and former administrative coordinator of the Shelburne Recreation Center. Before her administrative career, Harris was the former women's basketball coach at the University of Massachusetts Boston, Roxbury Community College, and Emerson College. Harris was also the longest serving member on the Boston School Committee.

Harris was born in 1938 and raised in Roxbury as the youngest of five children. She graduated from high school in 1955.

Harris served as the deputy commissioner of Parks and Recreation in the Boston Parks Department. Harris founded the SAT preparation program in Boston public schools and the Reebok Educational Athletic Partnership that provides community programs for students.

Harris has been recognized with the Mayor's African American Life Time Award. She was inducted into the Naismith Basketball Hall of Fame in 2012. She was the recipient of Boston Municipal Research Bureau's Henry L. Shattuck Award for public service. In 2023, she was recognized as one of "Boston’s most admired, beloved, and successful Black Women leaders" by the Black Women Lead project.
