= Elaine Macmann Willoughby =

American educator and writer of children's books (1926–2012)

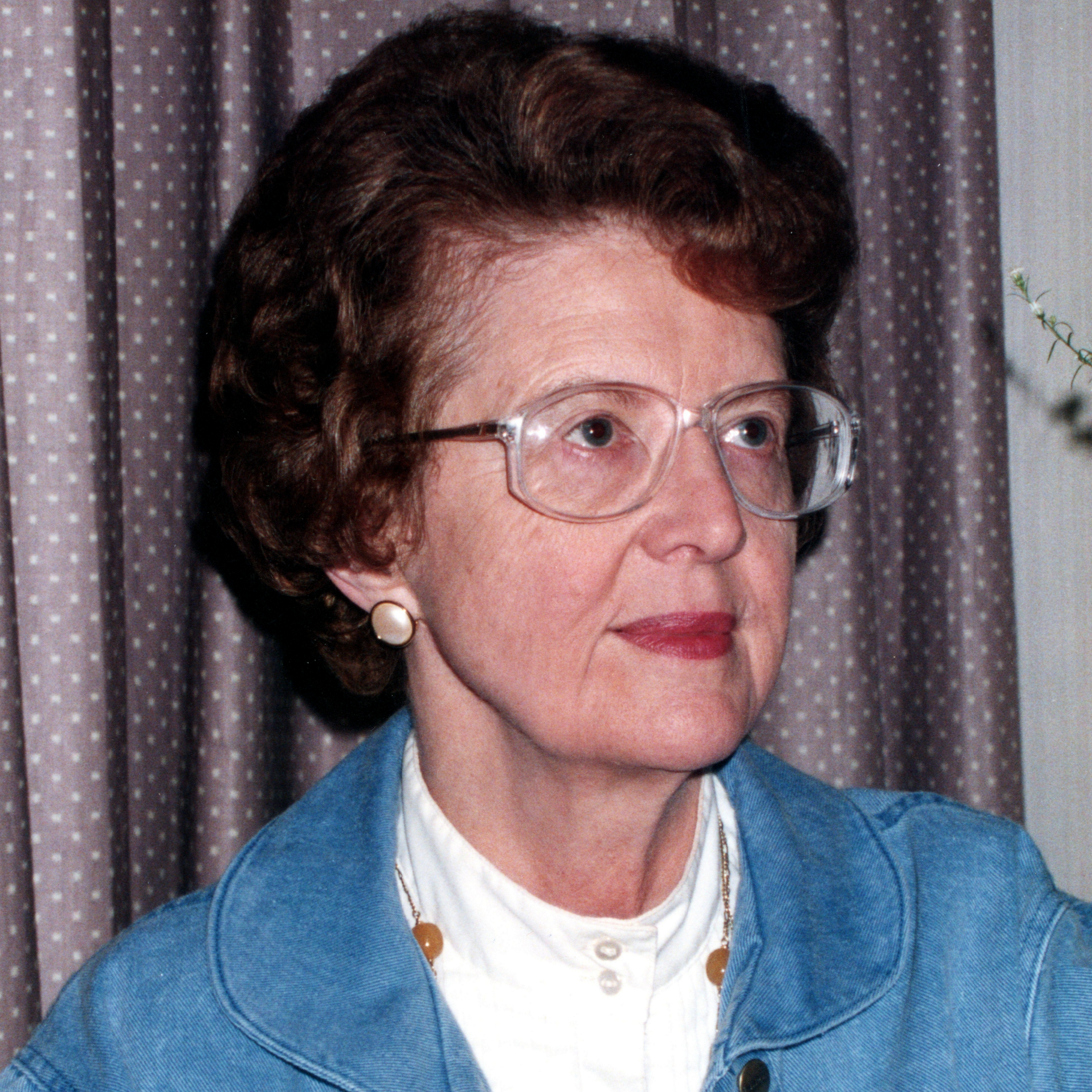
- Born: March 22, 1926; Lexington, Massachusetts, United States
- Died: November 12, 2012 (aged 86); Portsmouth, New Hampshire
- Resting place: New Castle, New Hampshire
- Education: University of Rhode Island; Breadloaf School of English; Teachers College, Columbia University
- Alma mater: Wheelock College; Columbia University
- Occupations: Teacher, writer
- Spouse: Robert Hugh Willoughby
- Writing career
- Genre: Children's books

Elaine Macmann "Mac" Willoughby (March 22, 1926 – November 12, 2012) was an American educator and writer of children's books.

== Life ==
Elaine Maybelle Macmann, known as "Mac", was born in Lexington, Massachusetts, and was the only child of Walter and Mabel Macmann. She received a B.S. of Education from Wheelock College, graduating in 1949 as vice-president of her class. In the summer of 1951 she also attended the University of Rhode Island, and in the summer of 1953 attended the Breadloaf School of English at Middlebury College. She received her MA and PhD in Education from the Teachers College, Columbia University, from 1954 to 1957.

Her teaching career began with primary school where she taught 1st grade in Norwood, Massachusetts, from 1949–1951, in Arlington, Virginia, from 1951–1952, and Wilmington, Delaware, from 1952–1953. She also taught at the Agnes Russel Center of the Teachers College while pursuing her MA and PhD. After graduating from Columbia she pursued teaching opportunities at the college level where she taught Language Arts, Children's Literature, and Child Development at Bowling Green State University, Kent State University, the University of New Hampshire, Oberlin College, and Baldwin-Wallace College.

She married the flutist Robert Hugh Willoughby in the summer of 1957, after having dated him off and on for several years. They moved to Oberlin, Ohio, where he was teaching at Oberlin College. In 1960 they spent a year in Cincinnati, where their son John was born. In 1987 they moved to New Castle, New Hampshire, which was the setting for several of her books.

She actively supported a variety of charities, from the schools she attended to local charities. To help raise funds and awareness for the Strawbery Banke Museum, she wrote "The Story of Strawbery Banke" in 1981 that sold at the museum gift shop with all profits going to the museum.

Elaine Willoughby died of a cerebral stroke on November 12, 2012, in Portsmouth, New Hampshire, and is buried in New Castle, New Hampshire.

== Writing career ==
Her children's books were widely reviewed and well received. For example, her 1980 title, Boris and the Monstors appeared in a 1980 article in USA Today about favorite books to read aloud at bedtime, and Risky Business appeared in a Chicago Tribune list of the best books of 1956. Two of her books, Mystery of the Island Fires and Mystery of the Lobster Thieves were selected and printed by Weekly Reader for their Children's Book Club editions.

== Selected works ==
- Macmann, Elaine (1956). Risky Business. Putnam and Sons.
- Macmann, Elaine (1957). Ozzie and the 19th of April. Putnam and Sons.
- Willoughby, Elaine (1972). That's How The Ball Bounces. Garrard. ISBN 978-0811669573.
- Willoughby, Elaine (1973). No, No, No, and Yes. Garrard. ISBN 978-0811667210.
- Willoughby, Elaine (1978). Mystery of the Lobster Thieves. Xerox Education Publications. ISBN 978-0883752173.
- Willoughby, Elaine (1980). Boris and the Monsters. Houghton Mifflin. ISBN 978-0395290675.
- Willoughby, Elaine (1991). Mystery of the Island Fires. Xerox Education Publications. ISBN 978-0837401188.
