= Robert Hugh Willoughby =

American classical flute player and teacher (1921–2018)

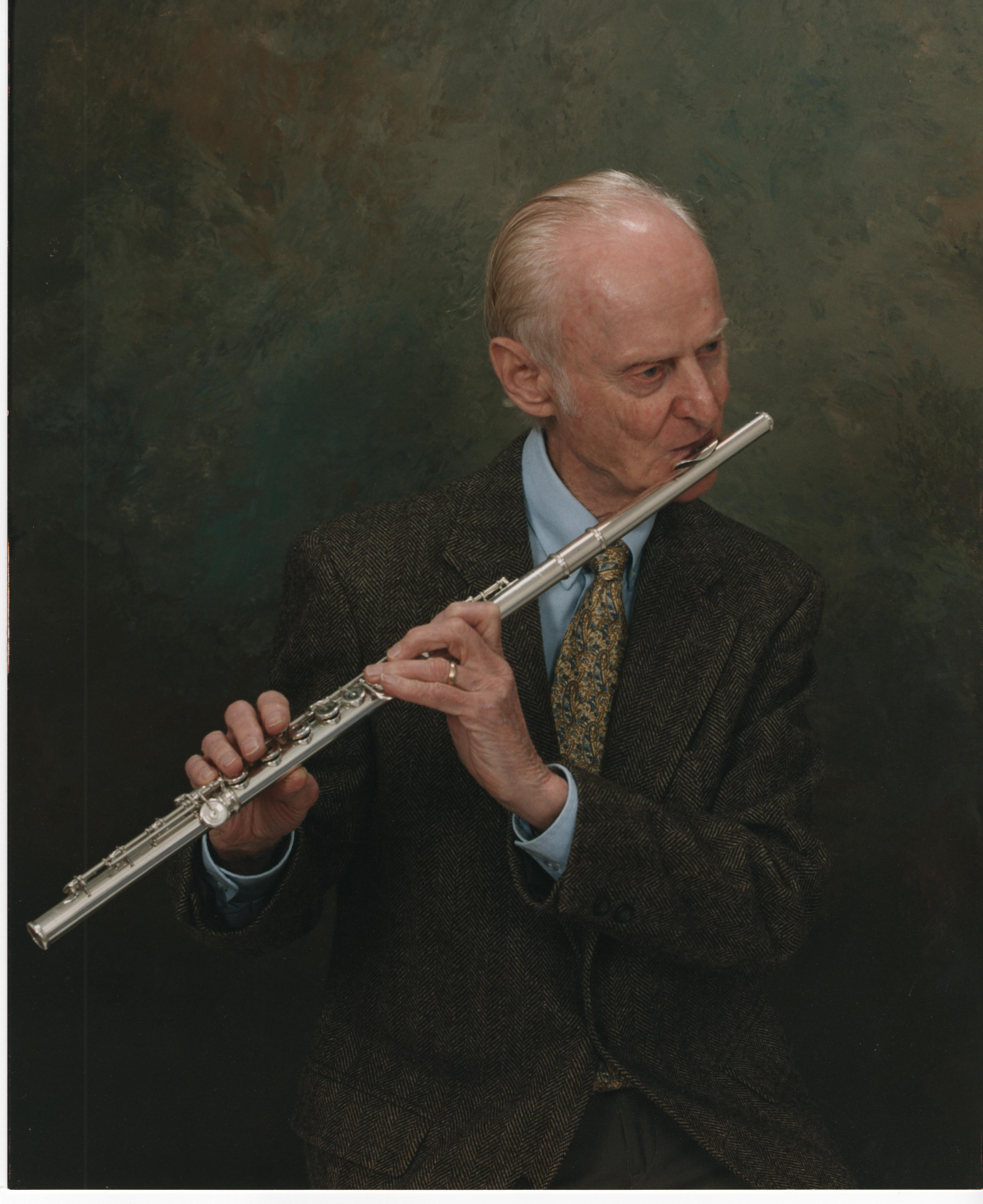

Background information
- Born: June 6, 1921; Grundy Center, Iowa, United States
- Died: March 27, 2018 (aged 96)
- Occupations: flute player and teacher
- Instruments: modern flute, Baroque flute

Robert Hugh Willoughby (June 6, 1921 – March 27, 2018) was an American classical flute player and flute teacher. He played both Baroque and modern flute. He has been described by Flute magazine as the "American grandmaster of the flute".

Willoughby taught for many years at Oberlin College, where he was the first Robert Wheeler Professor of Performance. He taught for ten years at the Peabody Institute, and later at the Longy School of Music of Bard College. He received the Alumni Achievement Award from Eastman School of Music and in 1996 he received a Lifetime Achievement Award from the National Flute Association.

== Students ==
Among his many students is the jazz flute player Paul Horn.

== Selected discography ==
- The Oberlin Woodwind Quintet:

Robert Willoughby, flute

James Caldwell, oboe

Lawrence McDonald, clarinet

Robert Fries, French horn

Kenneth Moore, bassoon

Saturday, January 14, 1984, 8:00 p.m. in Hamman Hall, Rice University Digital Scholarship Archive http://scholarship.rice.edu/handle/1911/76867

== Personal life ==
He married author Elaine Macmann Willoughby in 1957.

== Publications ==
- "The Flute Practice Techniques", Conn-Selmer Keynotes, 1974.

== Further reading and listening ==
- "Robert Willoughby – Seeking Variety" (interview with William Montgomery). Flute Talk (October 1984): 2–6.
- "Robert Willoughby: Combining the Best of Schools" (interview with Kerry Walker). Flute Talk (December 1994): 8–10.
- "From Mariano and Kincaid to Decades of Fine Teaching" (interview with Vanessa Mulvey and Vanessa Holroyd). Flute Talk (February 2001): 18–20
- Jictoria Jicha, "Robert Willoughby Combines the Wisdom of Three Masters". Flute Talk (November 2003): 4–11.
- Leonard L. Garrison, "Happy Birthday, Bob: A Tribute to Robert Willoughby" The Flutist Quarterly XXVI (2, Winter 2001): 57–61
- Leonard L. Garrison, "90th Birthday Celebration for Robert Willoughby". Flute Talk 31 (4, December 2011): 12–13
- "A Conversation with Robert Willoughby" (interview with Patricia George). Flute Talk 31 (4, December 2011): 14–17
- Aralee Dorough, "Robert Willoughby: The Next Decade". The Flutist Quarterly XXXVII (4, Summer 2012): 30–33.
- "Robert Willoughby, Noted Traverso Teacher, Feted at Oberlin". Early Music America 18 (3, Fall 2012): 39
- "Robert Willoughby", The Growing Bolder Radio Network (June 22, 2014)
- Leela Breithaupt, Katherine Borst Jones, "Robert Willoughby 95 Lessons". Flute Talk 36 (September 2016): 24-27
