= Boston Business School =

Boston Business School was established in 1914 to provide technical training education to the people of Boston, Massachusetts. It was located just outside Dudley Street in the Roxbury section of Boston and moved to Commonwealth Ave. in Boston. It was founded as Boston Clerical School and was established within Roxbury High School.

The school merged with Roxbury Community College in 1984. Records are available at Registrar's Office.

== Notable graduates ==
- Richard Scarry (studied but did not graduate), children's book author and illustrator
