= When Colleges Close =

When Colleges Close: Leading in a Time of Crisis is a 2021 book by Mary Churchill and David Chard, published by Johns Hopkins University Press. It documents the trajectory of Wheelock College, which merged into Boston University in 2018.

== Background ==
Both Churchill and Chard worked for Wheelock, the former as the vice president of academic affairs, and the latter as president of the university.

== Contents ==
The introduction documents the trend of higher education which imperil tertiary institutions with smaller sizes.

Chapter 1 documents why Wheelock College had to merge.

Chapter 2 documents the beginning of Chard's term as president and his discovery of the university's state.

Chapter 3 documents how the university planned its merger process and how it would find who it would merge into.

Chapter 4 documents the university's initial efforts to find a merger partner. The development of how the university selected who it would merge with is covered in Chapter 5 and in the subsequent chapter; Joseph M. Marron, who works for National University, wrote that these two chapters form "the heart of the book".

Chapter 6 covers the merger announcement with Boston University, and the subsequent two chapters cover the merger process.

== Reception ==
Mary Battenfeld, who previously worked for Boston University as a non-tenure track professor, argued that the authors painted the loss in positive terms and "gloss over real crises" as well as not considering how "ocean of privilege and inequity" affects the statuses of colleges.

Marron stated that the work is "a strong leadership text".

Tara P. Nicola stated that the work was "compelling" and that it "offers fascinating insight", though she argued that using the third person perspective made portions too impersonal.
