= Jackie Jenkins-Scott =

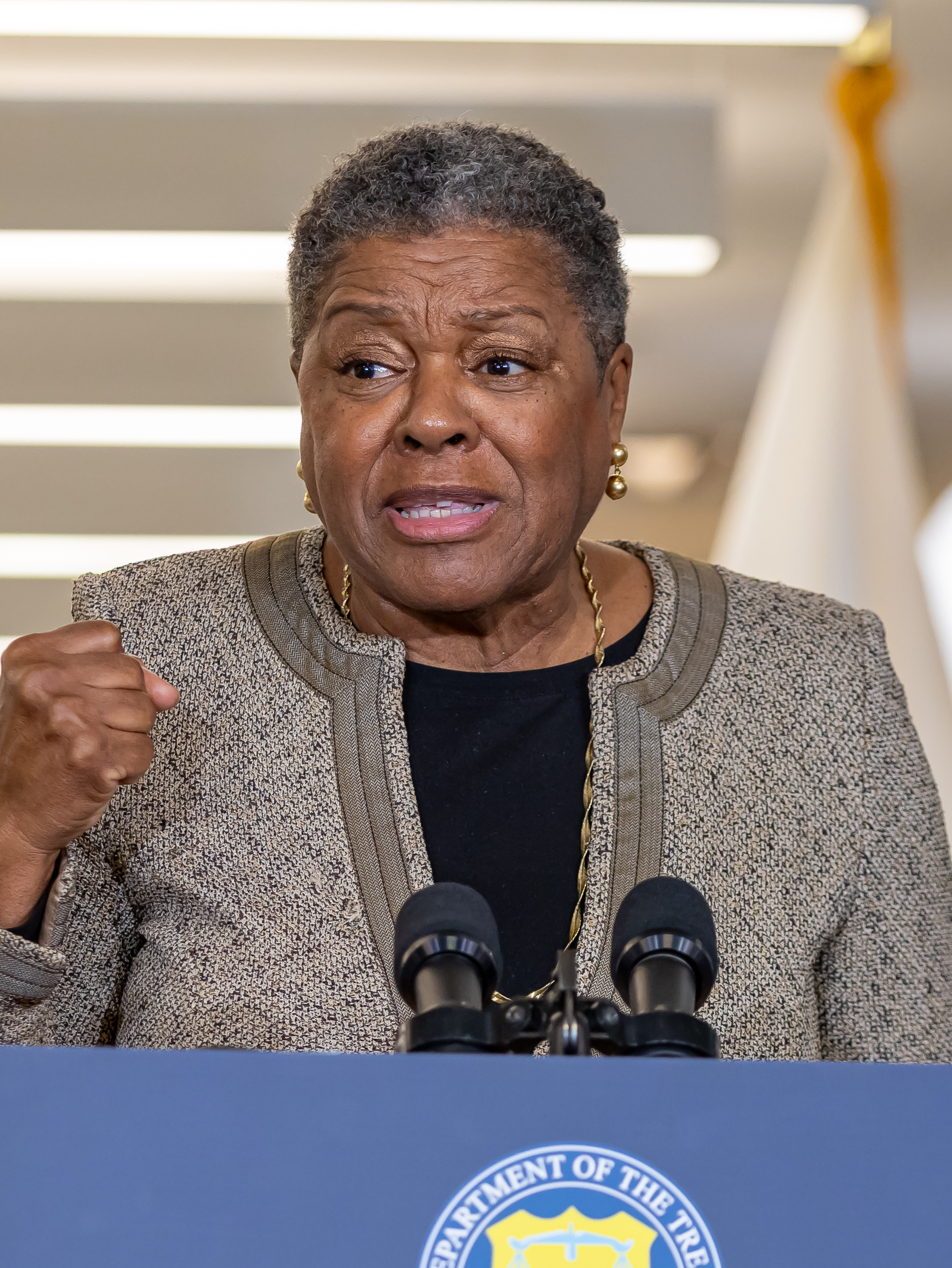
- Jenkins-Scott in 2024

Interim President of Roxbury Community College
- Incumbent
- Assumed office February 7, 2022

President of Wheelock College
- In office 2004–2016

Personal details
- Born: August 18, 1949

Jackie Jenkins-Scott (born August 18, 1949) was the current interim president of Roxbury Community College. She formerly served as the 13th president of Wheelock College from 2004–2016, and was its first African-American president. She is also the founder and president of JJS Advising, a consulting company that specializes in leadership development as well as organizational and corporate strategy.

== Education ==
Jenkins-Scott received a Bachelor of Science from Eastern Michigan University, a master's degree in social work from Boston University School of Social Work, and completed a postgraduate research fellowship at Radcliffe College. She is also a member of Delta Sigma Theta sorority.

In 2003, Jenkins-Scott received an honorary doctorate in education from Wheelock College and also holds honorary doctorates from Bentley College, Mount Ida College, Suffolk University, and Northeastern University. She also received an honorary doctor of law from the University of Massachusetts-Boston in 2012.

In 2018 she served as the Richard L. and Ronay A. Menschel Senior Leadership Fellow at the Harvard T.H. Chan School of Public Health.

== Career ==
=== CEO and President of Dimock Community Health Center (1983–2004) ===
From 1983 to 2004, Jenkins-Scott was the president and chief executive officer of the Dimock Community Health Center based in Roxbury, Massachusetts. Prior to joining Dimock, she had held a number of positions in the Massachusetts Departments of Public and Mental Health.

=== President of Wheelock College (2004–2016) ===
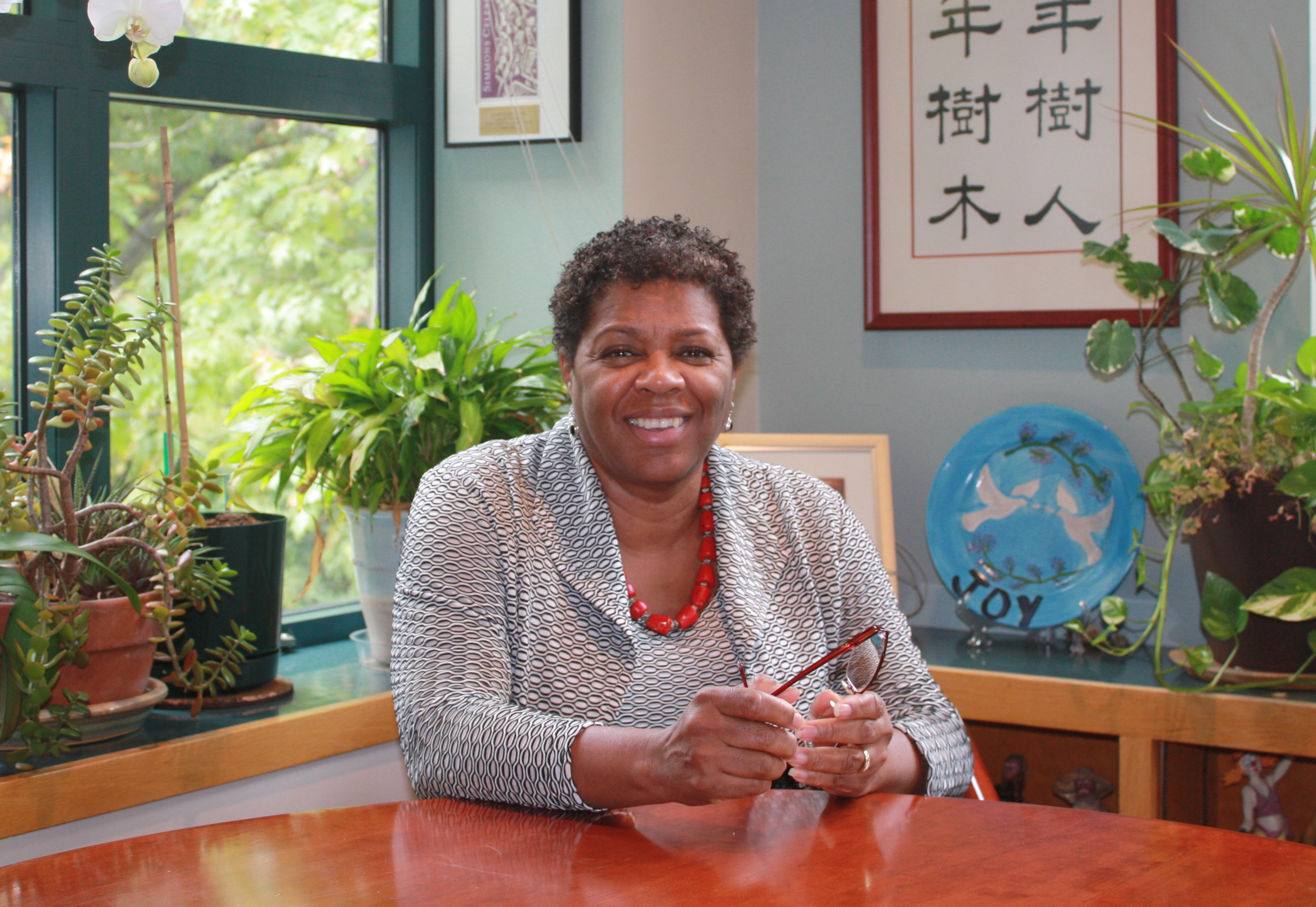
Jenkins-Scott in 2008

From 2004 to 2016, Jenkins-Scott served as the president of Wheelock College. While president, Jenkins-Scott helped to host Wheelock College's first international conference on children, youth, and families in July 2013, which drew attendees from more than 40 countries.

While Jenkins-Scott was president, Wheelock increased its enrollment and diversity, and, according to the school, the number of first-generation college students grew from 25 to 41 percent from 2005 to 2014. The college also opened a new campus center and dormitory in May 2013.

=== Interim President of Roxbury Community College (2022–2024) ===
Since February 27, 2022, Jekins-Scott has served as interim president of Roxbury Community College. She had been unanimously nominated to the college's board in December 2021, and was approved by Massachusetts Commissioner of Higher Education Carlos E. Santiago in late-January.

=== Nonprofit work ===
Jenkins-Scott has served on the board of directors of The Boston Foundation, the Kennedy Library Foundation and Museum, the Boston Plan for Excellence, WGBH, the National Board of Jumpstart, the Council on Social Work Education, Century Bank and Trust Company, and the Tufts Health Plan. In April 2007, Boston's mayor, Thomas M. Menino, selected her to co-chair his School Readiness Action Planning Team. Jenkins-Scott co-chaired Governor Deval L. Patrick's Readiness Project, the group responsible for developing a 10-year strategic plan to implement the vision for education in the Commonwealth of Massachusetts as outlined by Patrick in a June 2007 speech.

From 2005 to 2015 she served on the board of directors of The Boston Foundation.

From 2002 to 2017 she served on the board of directors for the John F. Kennedy Library.

From 2004 to 2017 she served on the board of directors for the Tufts health Plan.

In 2017 she was appointed by Governor Charlie baker to the Board of Directors for the Massachusetts Foundation for the Humanities and Public Policy.

As of 2019 she currently serves on the board of directors for: Century Bank, Schott Foundation for Public Education, The National Board of Jumpstart and The Center for Community Change. She serves as president of The Massachusetts Women's Forum. She also serves on the board of advisors for the John F. Kennedy Library.

=== Other work ===
In July 2012, Jenkins-Scott began a monthly blog on the Huffington Post.

== Awards ==
During her career, Jenkins-Scott has received a number of awards including, the 2010 Visiting Nurse Association of Boston Lifetime Achievement Award, and the 2010 Color Magazine Change Agent Award. She also has received the Associated Industries of Massachusetts Legacy of Leadership award as well as the Pinnacle Lifetime Achievement Award, both from the Greater Boston Chamber of Commerce. Jenkins-Scott received the Boston University Distinguished Alumni Award in 2004.
