= Judith Black =

American professional storyteller

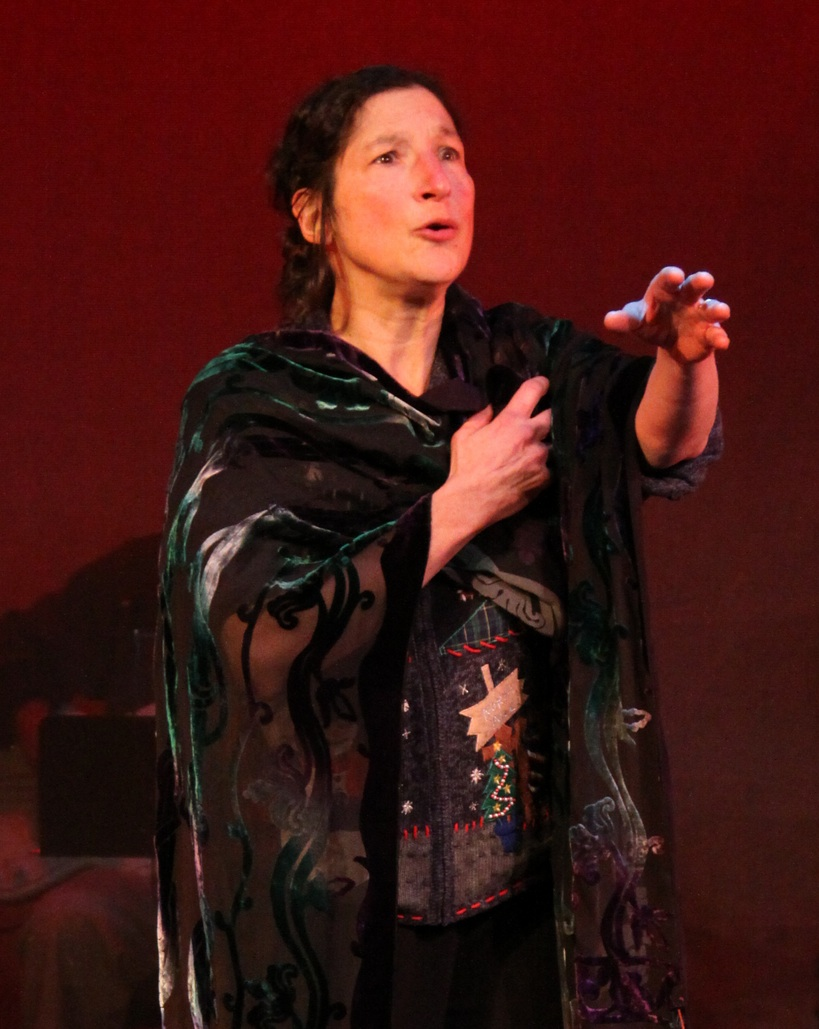
Judith Black

Judith Black is an American professional storyteller, who has toured internationally, telling stories to a wide ranging audience in the United States, Europe, and the Near East. She has produced thirteen CDs, and won a variety of awards, such as the coveted Oracle Award. Her work has been featured in venues such as the Smithsonian Institution and the Montreal Comedy Festival, and has been featured seven times at the National Storytelling Festival. In addition she has produced a variety of seminars and workshops for storytellers. She has been commissioned by the U.S. Department of the Interior, National Public Radio, religious institutions, and non-profit organisations to create original stories that strengthen their respective missions.

Black studied education at Wheelock College, and drama at the Royal Academy of Dramatic Art. She has also worked as an actress and founded the Three Apples Storytelling Festival. During her 24-year tenure as an adjunct professor with the Lesley University Graduate School, Black developed and implemented instruction in the use of storytelling to extend cognitive, curricular, social and emotional objectives in the educational setting. Black has also been instrumental in introducing story slams in Amsterdam, Finland, and Sweden, emphasising personal experience and authenticity in shaping stories for public telling.

== Reception ==
Black was inducted into the National Storytelling Network's Circle of Excellence "for exceptional commitment and exemplary contribution to the art of storytelling." This award is offered to "artists who are recognized nationally by their peers to be master storytellers who set the standards for excellence." Black's contribution to storytelling comes in several forms, including commissioned work for the Disney Institute and the Massachusetts Foundation for the Humanities, as well as presentations at the National Storytelling Festival, the National Trust for Historic Preservation, the Hillel International Leaders Assembly, and the National Museum of American History. She has won numerous awards and citations, such as the Oracle Award, the Gold Medal for Family Entertainer of the Year, and the National Youth Storytelling Pegasus Award. Black's publications can be found in Storytelling Magazine, The Yarnspinner, Journal of Reading, Chosen Tales: Stories Told by Jewish Storytellers, and Chicken Soup for the Single Soul. Notable reviews include a variety of media outlets, including:

- The Boston Globe: "For a wicked good time, see Judith Black's Banned in the Western Suburbs ... Black's lively presentation is more of a one woman show than a session of storytelling."
- The Boston Phoenix: "Her sympathetic persona is a cross between Lily Tomlin and Woody Allen, the hard edge of feminist certitude cushioned by self-deprecating humor that never slides into self hatred." (Banned in the Western Suburbs)
- The Boston Phoenix: "Storyteller, Judith Black's latest solo performance may be called Teetering on the Edge, but this actress/storyteller is one awesomely confident babe ... she'll have you giggling in the aisles."
- Christian Science Monitor: "There were tales and tellers that had moments of nobility and beauty. Black's strongly felt parable about a grove of rootless trees symbolizing the Jewish people evoked feelings of shared humanity."

== Repertoire ==
Black's various awards and recognitions indicate her work is not restricted to one or another genre, topic, or age group. She has produced children's stories that deal with authentic issues through laughter, as well as darker features of comedy and tragedy. In a performance review by Loren Niemi (2008), Black's spoken-word art is described as "strong material, full of stark imagery and powerful themes." Black delves into riskier sorts of dark humour, featured in for example That Fading Scent, but also touches on the tragic sentiments of war, as described in Homecoming, a compelling story of a mother's helplessness in the face of war.

=== Style ===
That Fading Scent, which employs cross cultural depictions facilitated through the Snow White motif, was well received by the 2006 Fringe audience, but breached the edges of the "mixed (i.e. family) audience" at the 2007 National Storytelling Network Conference, illustrating the subjective limits of what is, or is not, considered appropriate. As Niemi noted, Black's work broaches a philosophical aesthetic dilemma in the storytelling community:

How willing are we as a community of storytellers and story listeners to give permission for the performance of different styles and levels of challenge and maturity? How willing are we to entertain performances that subvert the expectations of safe and humorous yarns that have become the norm of the last 20 years of concert telling, to allow storytellings that burst those boundaries and perhaps fail to please an audience in the process? (Niemi 2008, 53)

In this sense, testing the subjective limits of normalcy serves up a rescue attempt on the field of storytelling by promoting its self-awareness as a discipline and profession. The uncomfortable perturbations of social breaching, as exemplified in Black's edgier work, contribute to the overall style and aesthetics of storytelling as a professional endeavour. As Mann (2009) noted, the development of storytelling's aesthetic forms is to some degree the result of a wide variety of approaches to how stories such as The Epic of Gilgamesh have been told. Black's "storytelling in character" is listed alongside Anna Deavere Smith and Cirque du Soleil as important in the history of story telling.

=== Themes ===
As previously noted, Black's work is multifaceted, embracing a wide array of topics, as well as cultural themes. Black often delves into issues surrounding the Jewish identity. Several of her works are listed in the Jewish Storytelling Coalition's annotated bibliography of important tales of Jewish culture. These stories carry on the traditions of "folktales, fairytales, legends, midrashim, and parables" found within the annals of Jewish cultural. Judaism boasts a strong tradition of interdependence between written text and spoken word; Black is listed in a selection of important works in this tradition.

Black has also confronted the topic of ageing and death in America, telling stories in the context of medical and elder care settings. For example, her story Retiring the Champ has been credited in the American Journal of Alzheimer's Disease & Other Dementias as providing a "poignant reminder of the humanity of the patient and the complexity of patient relationships to family and environment." Retiring the Champ was also noted in several medical publication sources as providing a valuable contribution to issues surrounding the medical community such as death, dying, suffering, and loss, while calling on the listener to evaluate ethical and moral implications of specific medical practices, such as doctor/patient/family relations and the hierarchy of medical institutions.

Finally, Black's work has also been tailored to provide practical applications to professionals in an educational setting. Black herself earned a bachelor's degree in education; she often employs the techniques of classroom teaching to convey her message. Massachusetts Cable Educational Television commissioned Black to develop three separate television series for children. She was also commissioned to create a first person reenactment of the life of Lucy Stone. In December 2011 she was awarded a grant from the US Department of Health and Human Services to create a three part educational series promoting healthier lifestyles for youth and adults. Finally, she has been commissioned to create works for historical associations, such as the U.S.S. Constitution Museum, which lists her as an important resource of historical stories concerning the War of 1812.
