= Wheelock College =

Private college in Boston, Massachusetts, US (1888–2018)

Coordinates: 42°20′30.1″N 71°6′22.9″W

- Former name: Miss Wheelock's Kindergarten Training School
- Type: Private college
- Active: 1888–2018
- Academic affiliations: Colleges of the Fenway; NAICU
- Endowment: $45.7 million
- Faculty: 163
- Undergraduates: 811
- Postgraduates: 358
- Location: Boston, Massachusetts, U.S.
- Campus: Urban, 1.5 acres (0.61 ha)
- Colors: Yellow & blue
- Nickname: Wildcats
- Sporting affiliations: NCAA Division III
- Mascot: Willy the Wildcat
- Website: wheelock.edu
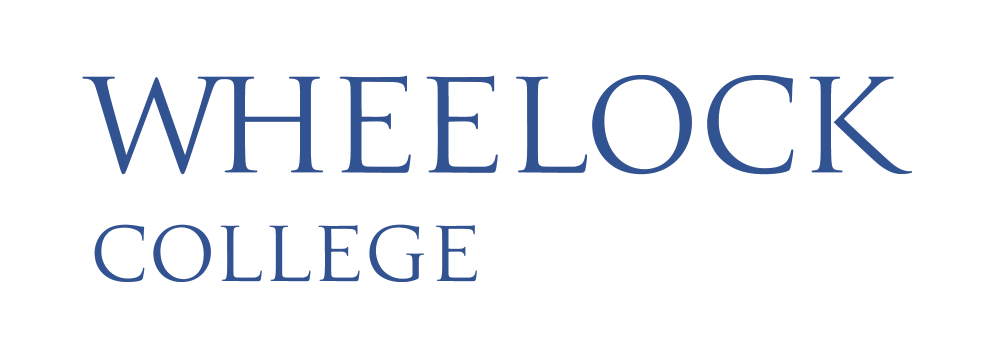

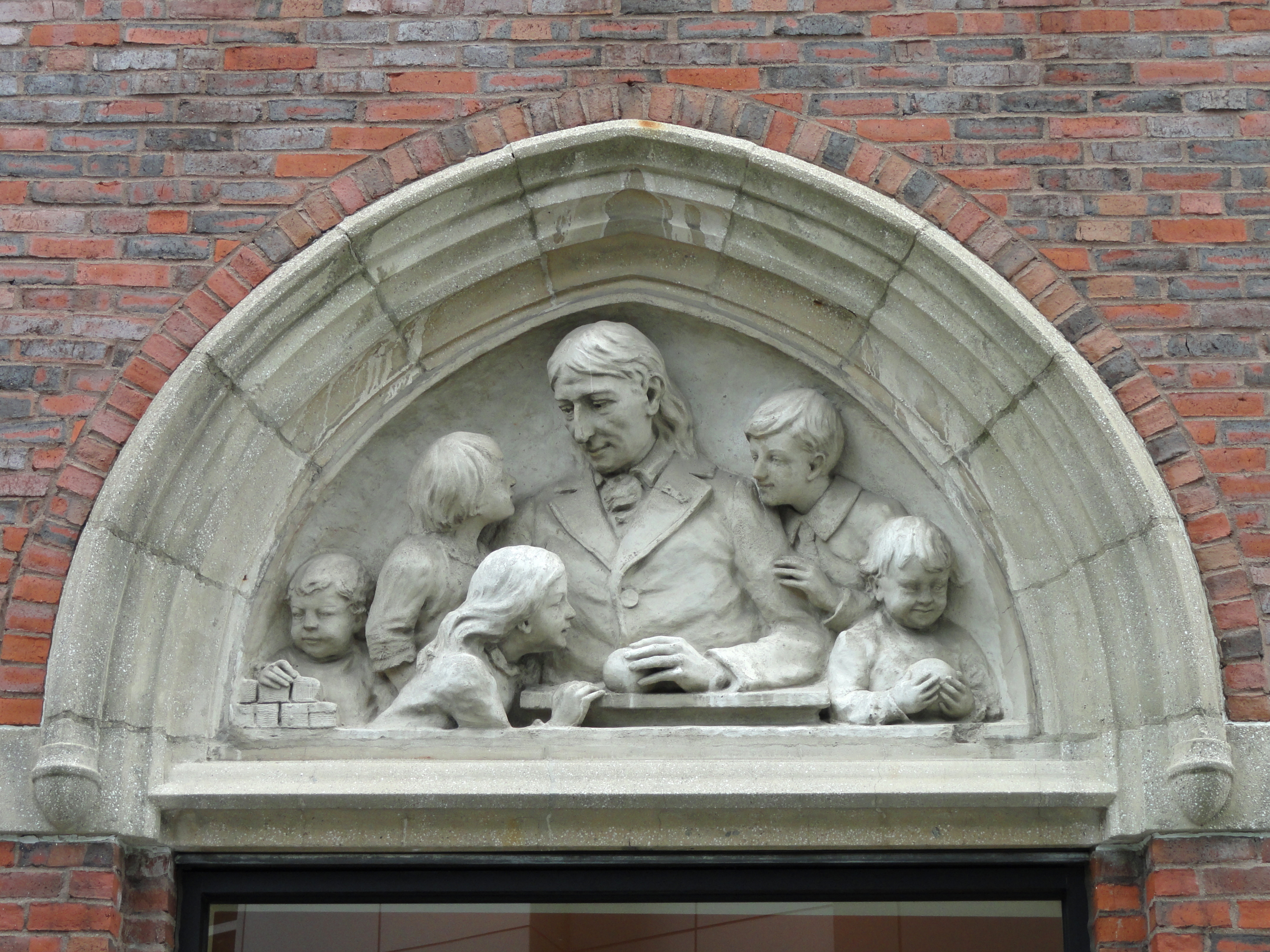
Bas-relief of Friedrich Fröbel, founder of the kindergarten movement, over the library doorway

Wheelock College was a private college in Boston, Massachusetts, United States. The college was founded in 1888 as the Miss Wheelock's Kindergarten Training School and was merged into Boston University as part of the university's Wheelock College of Education and Human Development in 2018.

Founded in 1888 by Lucy Wheelock as the Miss Wheelock's Kindergarten Training School, it offered undergraduate and graduate programs that focused on the Arts & Sciences, Education and Child Life, and Social Work and Family Studies to improve the lives of children and families. The college's academic programs merged with Boston University School of Education on June 1, 2018, and were incorporated as Boston University Wheelock College of Education & Human Development. The physical campus of Wheelock College is now named the Boston University Fenway Campus, which includes a dining hall, student housing, and the Wheelock Family Theatre.

Wheelock was a member of the Colleges of the Fenway and the Association of Independent Colleges and Universities in Massachusetts and accredited by:

- New England Association of Schools and Colleges
- National Council for Accreditation of Teacher Education
- Council on Social Work Education

The Wheelock Wildcats competed in the NCAA Division III in the New England Collegiate Conference. The college offered five varsity men's teams and six varsity women's teams, as well as intramural teams through the Colleges of the Fenway. In addition to athletics, Wheelock College offered many clubs and organizations that allow students to become involved on campus and in the community.

== History ==
Lucy Wheelock

In 1888, Lucy Wheelock began a kindergarten teacher training class at the former Chauncy-Hall School (now Chapel Hill – Chauncy Hall School). She started this school in part to train teachers for Boston's immigrant populations. In 1892, the Wheelock Alumnae Association was formed. The following year, the program was extended to two years.

In 1896, Wheelock established her own school, The Wheelock School. The school moved to 284 Dartmouth Street and had a dormitory system. In 1899, the program was expanded to begin training teachers of primary grades. In 1914, the school moved to the Riverway in Boston.

In 1939, Lucy Wheelock retired from the school after 50 years as director. That same year, the Wheelock School was incorporated as the nonprofit Wheelock College. The Lucy Wheelock Child Center also opened in Roxbury that year. In 1940, Dr. Winifred Bain became president of the college. In 1941, the college petitioned the state to be allowed to grant bachelor's degrees in education.

In 1952, Wheelock College got approval from the Board of Collegiate Authority of Massachusetts Department of Education award master's and Phd degrees. Dr. Winifred Bain retired in 1955 and was succeeded by Dr. Frances McClellan Mayfarth. By this time, Wheelock was accredited by the National Council for Accreditation of Teacher Education. In 1966, Dr. Margaret H. Merry was appointed president.

In 1971, Dr Merry left her post as president. Between 1971 and 1973, the school had three presidents, Dr. Donald R. Cruickshank, Dr. William L. Irvine, and Dr. Gordon L. Marshall.

The Wheelock Family Theatre opened in 1981 and held its first production, Alice's Adventures in Wonderland. In 1983, Gordon Marshall retired and Dr. Daniel S. Cheever, Jr. became President of the college. In 1984, the college awarded its first Bachelor of Social Work degree.

In 1991, Gerald Tirozzi replaced Daniel Cheever as president. In 1992, the Center for International Education, Leadership, and Innovation was opened. Tirozzi resigned as president in 1993 and Marjorie Bakken was named Acting President. She was formally inaugurated as president the following year. In 1994, Wheelock College joined the Colleges of the Fenway consortium.

In 2004, Jackie Jenkins-Scott became the 13th president of Wheelock College. In 2005, Wheelock College and Jumpstart began a partnership, providing students with a field experience opportunity to mentor children in Roxbury.

In 2012, Wheelock launched an online master's program. In 2015, the New England Association of Schools and Colleges released a report that found that Wheelock's administration lacked financial transparency and didn't have enough professors. The report stated that the college needed at least 15 additional instructors to handle the school's course load. Eighteen staff members left the college that year and some professors cited concerns that the college had become less academically selective. In 2016, Dr. David J. Chard began his term as president of Wheelock College.

In 2017, Wheelock College entered into discussions with Boston University with the goal of merging Wheelock with BU. The two schools merged on June 1, 2018.

== Academics ==
The principal undergraduate academic units of Wheelock College were the Professional majors and the Arts and Sciences majors.

=== Online graduate degree programs ===
Wheelock offered one master's degree program online:

- Teaching Elementary Math and Science (STEM)

=== International degree programs ===
Wheelock offered bachelor's and master's programs abroad.

- International Visiting Scholars

Wheelock hosted accomplished individuals from around the world. Through classes and seminars, scholars shared their expertise with Wheelock students, faculty, and the broader community.

- International Service Learning Trips

Students participated in trips abroad that combine service with learning. Recent trips include teaching English to elementary students in West Africa and working with an anti-sectarian program in Northern Ireland.

=== Honors program ===
Entering first-year students were automatically eligible for admission into the Honors Program if they had a high school GPA of 3.5 or higher and an SAT score (combined Critical Reading and Math Sections) of at least 1100. All accepted students who meet these requirements received an invitation to join the program. Honors students must maintain a cumulative GPA of 3.30 to remain in the Honors Program. Wheelock had a chapter of Pi Gamma Mu, the international honor society.

== Student life ==
- 65% of undergraduates lived on campus.
- 28 registered clubs and organizations, including a Student Government Association and individual class councils
- The Campus Center building was LEED-certified and contained a new student center, dining hall, and residence hall with suite-style accommodations for 108 students. It reportedly had "magnificent views of Boston."
- Student Policy Fellows Program helped students to develop their leadership, advocacy, and policy skills through a seminar and a field placement with a state legislator.

=== Resident housing ===
- Wheelock College offered six residence halls: Longwood House, Peabody Hall, Riverway House, Campus Center Student Residence, Pilgrim House and Colchester House. Longwood House, on Riverway, was a co-educational facility home to 70 students both first year and upper classman. Peabody Hall, also on Riverway, housed 260 undergraduates. Peabody had traditional style dorms as well as suite-style living. Riverway House, also on Riverway, was a co-educational dorm. The Campus Center Student Residence building was the newest dorm on campus, and is on Riverway. CCSR held 100 students. Pilgrim House, on Pilgrim Road, was home to 80 first year and upper-class women. Pilgrim had traditional dorms with community style living. Lastly Colchester House, on the Brookline campus, housed 25 graduate and undergraduate upperclassman students.

=== Community service ===
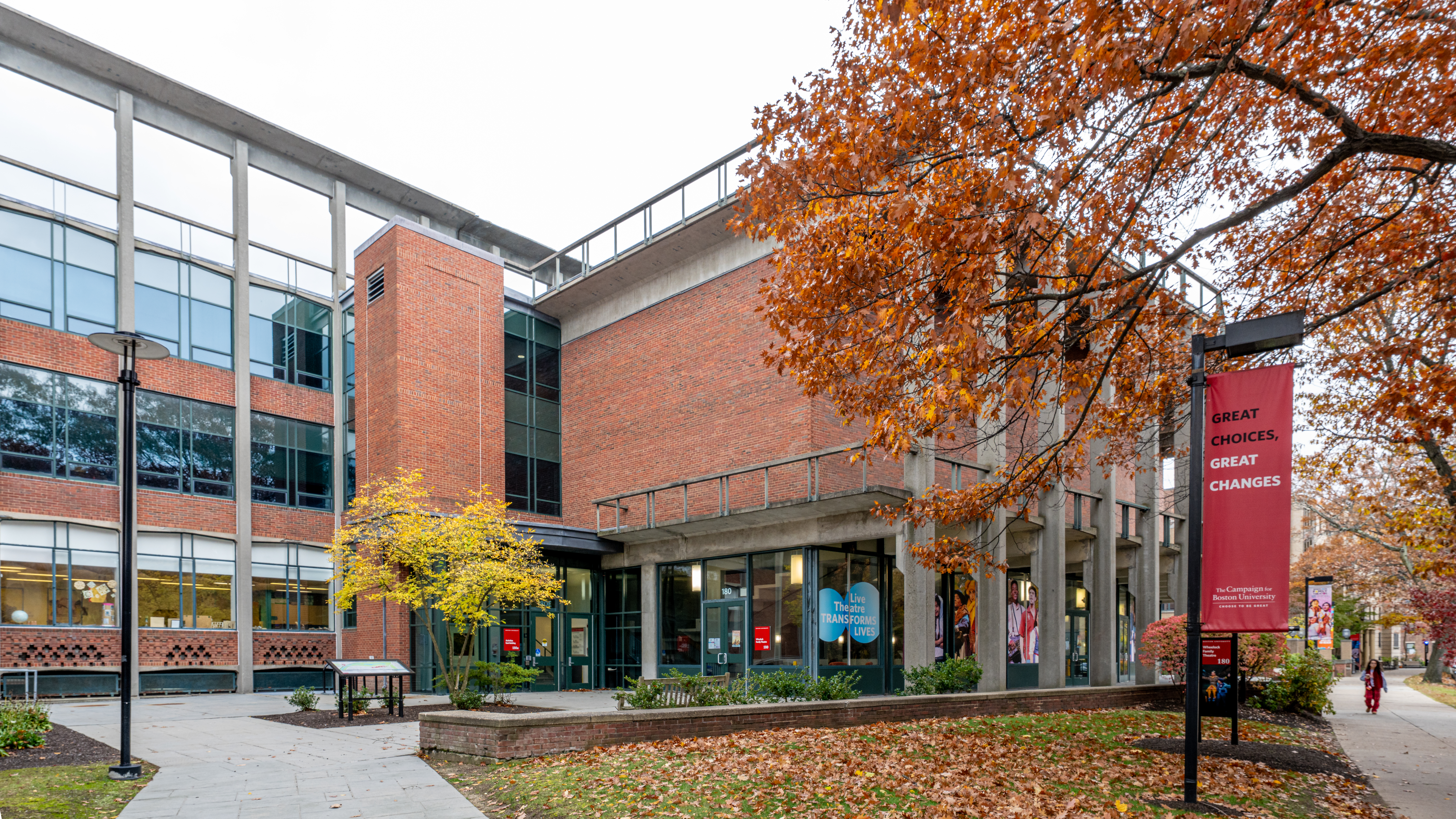
Wheelock Family Theatre

- Wheelock students provided an estimated 193,000 hours of service annually to the community through field experiences in more than 280 organizations.
- The Wheelock Mattahunt Community Partnership was a partnership between the City of Boston, the Mattapan community, and Wheelock College. Wheelock College was awarded the 2012 John Blackburn Award from The American Association of University Administrators for its work at the Mattahunt Community Center.
- 100% of all graduate social work students completed at least 1,200 hours in community settings during their academic program.
- 100% of the 26 clubs on campus participated in or initiate community service programs.
- In 2011, The Center of Excellence for Military Children and Families was established by Wheelock College in collaboration with the Massachusetts National Guard and the Military Child Education Coalition to draw attention to the many services available to aid military children and families, maximizing the visibility of military support systems and offering the resources of the Wheelock community to military families.
- Through its major productions, school and community partnerships, and educational programs, the professional Wheelock Family Theatre made theatre accessible and affordable to more than 35,000–40,000 people annually.

=== President's Higher Education Community Service Honor Roll ===
The President's Higher Education Community Service Honor Roll recognized institutions of higher education that supported exemplary community service programs and raise the visibility of effective practices in campus community partnerships. In 2014, Wheelock was recognized with distinction for their strides in the General Community Service category. The college chose to highlight three aspects of its curricula in the application: its partnership with the Mattahunt Community Center in Mattapan, MA; the Presidential International Service Learning Program; and the Ubuntu Arts Project, which was implemented annually by the Juvenile Justice and Youth Advocacy seniors. Launched in 2006, the Community Service Honor Roll highlighted the role colleges and universities have played in solving community challenges and as a result, in encouraging more students to pursue a lifelong path of civic engagement that achieves meaningful and measurable outcomes in the communities they serve. Honorees for the award were chosen based on a series of selection factors, including scope and innovation of service projects, percentage of student participation in service activities, incentives for service and the extent to which the school offers academic service-learning courses. This was the fourth consecutive year the Corporation for National and Community Service recognized Wheelock for achievements in community service with a place on the Honor Roll.

== Athletics ==
The Wheelock Wildcats participated in eleven NCAA Division III sports, competing in the New England Collegiate Conference.

Women's athletic teams:

- Basketball
- Cross-country
- Field hockey
- Lacrosse
- Soccer
- Softball
- Track & field

Men's athletic teams:

- Basketball
- Cross-country
- Lacrosse
- Tennis
- Soccer
- Track & field
- Volleyball

In addition to the varsity teams, there were intramural competitions between the Colleges of the Fenway.

== Notable people ==
- Judith Black, storyteller, studied education at Wheelock
- Philip R. Craig, author of the J.W. Jackson series; a professor at Wheelock College from 1965 until retiring to become a full-time writer in 1999
- Kayla Drescher, magician, won David Copperfield's "Search for the Next Great Magician"
- Margaret Hamilton, actress most famous for her role as the Wicked Witch in The Wizard of Oz
- Plum Johnson, Canadian writer and publisher; won the RBC Taylor Prize in 2015
- Kathryn Lasky, writer for children and adults
- Deborah A. Miranda, Native American writer and poet
- Eleanor Emlen Myers, archaeologist
- Gilda E. Nardone (M.S. educational administration), women's employment advocate and nonprofit director
- Mimi Stewart, politician; Democratic member of the New Mexico House of Representatives, representing District 21 since January 1995
- Elaine Macmann Willoughby, educator and writer of children's books; graduated in 1949 as vice-president of her class

== See also ==
- Bank Street College of Education
- Pacific Oaks College
- When Colleges Close, a book about Wheelock's merger
