= Roxbury Community College =

Public college in Boston, Massachusetts, US

Coordinates: 42°19′47.64″N 71°5′43.18″W

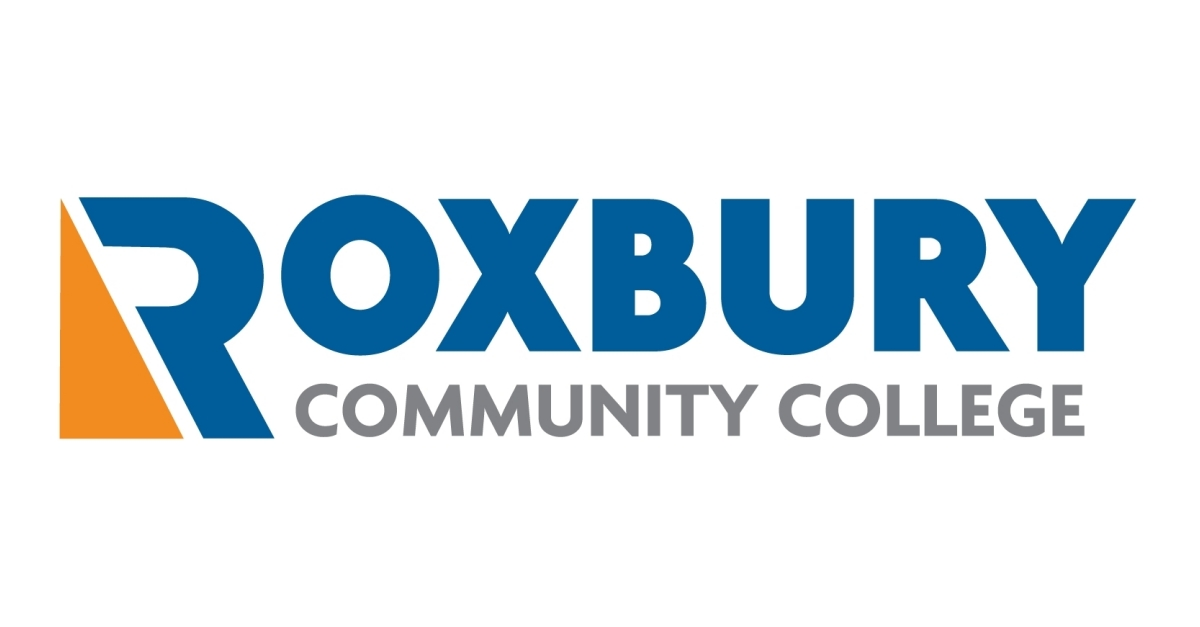
- Type: Public community college
- Established: 1973
- Accreditation: NECHE
- President: President Dr. Jonathan K. Jefferson
- Students: 2,382
- Location: Boston, Massachusetts, United States
- Campus: Urban
- Mascot: Tiger
- Website: www.rcc.mass.edu

Roxbury Community College (RCC) is a public community college in the Roxbury neighborhood of Boston, Massachusetts. RCC offers associate degrees in arts, and sciences, as well as certificates. RCC has transfer agreements with Curry College, Northeastern University, Emerson College, Lesley University, and other four-year schools. RCC credits transfer to all public colleges and universities in Massachusetts through the MassTransfer Program.

RCC's students are primarily Boston residents who identify as people of color: 80% of students identify as Black, Hispanic or two or more races, over 50% reside in Boston, and 83% receive Pell Grants.

== History ==
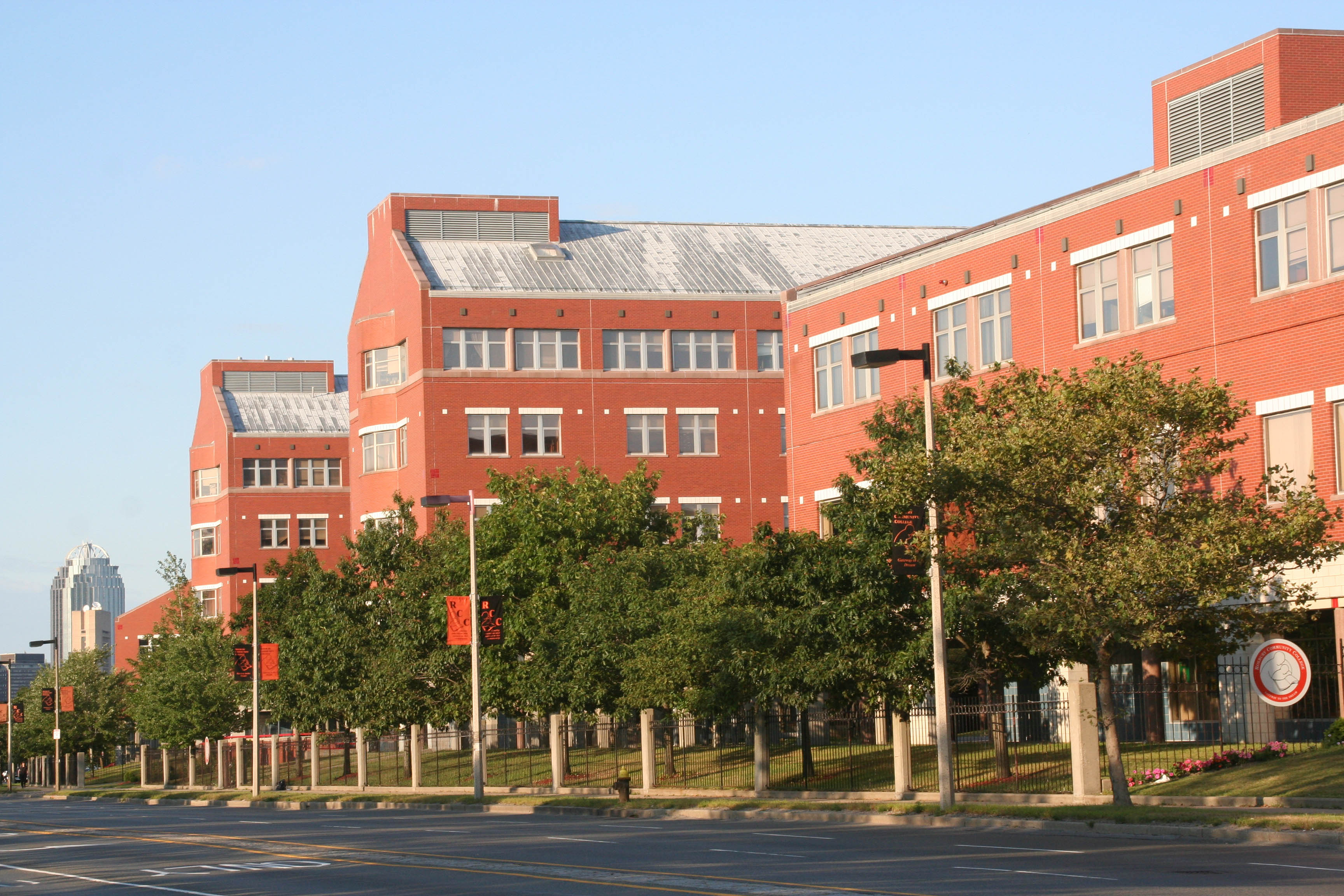

Founded in 1973, the 16-acre (6.5 ha), 6-building campus houses classrooms in addition to specialized science and computer laboratories. In 1984 the Boston Business School, founded in 1914, merged with the school. The campus also operates the Reggie Lewis Track & Athletic Center and the RCC Media Arts Center.

There was a long history of community education in Boston's Roxbury neighborhood, including the work of Boston Black United Front, which pooled resources to create educational programs for community members. After decades of activism and organizing within Boston's Black community, the Massachusetts legislature officially established a community college at Roxbury on July 1, 1968. After several years of planning, Roxbury Community College opened its doors on September 10, 1973, to 400 students. The first temporary home of RCC was located at 460 Blue Hill Avenue, in a building that used to be the home of a car dealership. The following year, it moved to 424 Dudley Street, which was a former nursing home. In 1982, it moved into the former Boston State College building on Huntington Avenue. In December 1982, Brunetta Wolfman was elected as RCC's first female president and was inaugurated on April 16, 1983. The college's current location, 1234 Columbus Avenue, opened on April 11, 1988. Campus construction began in 1985. Haitian president Jean Bertrand Aristide came to Roxbury on April 29, 1992. Aristide received an honorary degree during a ceremony held at RCC. In June 2012, Roxbury's president Terrence Gomes agreed to resign in the wake of an ongoing audit by the U.S. Department of Education, "questionable allocations in a review of financial aid records" conducted by the state auditor, and allegations of underreported crimes on campus. In June 2019, The Massachusetts Board of Registration in Nursing decided to withdraw the accreditation of the nursing program due to a series of leadership and financial issues at the college. In 2020, RCC developed a new nursing program. The program was provisionally approved by BORN in October 2020; a new student cohort is joining the program in Fall 2021. In 2021, RCC was named the second most influential community college in the nation.

President Valerie Roberson resigned in November 2021 under accusations of mismanagement, a steep drop in enrollment, and a slow mass resignation of staff. Accusations included failure to sign contracts with faculty, late payroll payments, overpayment and underpayment of employees, and failure to perform sex offender registry checks.

In 2021, the Department of Education classified Roxbury Community College as a Predominately Black Institution (PBI): "in 2021 the federal Department of Education classified [RCC] as a Predominately Black Institution, or PBI. That means they receive formula grants to specifically target Black students' educational success."

In February 2022, Jackie Jenkins-Scott became the interim president of RCC.

In May 2022, philanthropist Robert Hale and his wife, Karen, provided $1,000 to each graduate of Roxbury Community College during the college's 45th commencement exercises.

In 2023, as part of the college's 50th-anniversary celebration, RCC commemorated the community activism that played a pivotal role in the state's decision to dismiss the proposed 8-mile extension of Interstate 95 from Canton to the South End back in 1972. This commemoration was marked by a large banner displaying the following message: "If It Wasn't For Community Activism, You'd Be On A Highway Right Now".

Karilyn Crockett, a professor at the Massachusetts Institute of Technology and the author of People Before Highways, highlighted the significance of the anti-highway movement during an interview with The Boston Globe. She noted that this movement had a profound impact, giving rise to a generation of local civic leaders. Among them were Fred Salvucci, who later served as the Massachusetts transportation secretary, and Gloria Fox, who held the position of a state representative for approximately 30 years.

In June 2024, Dr. Jonathan K. Jefferson was named the 18th President of Roxbury Community College.

== Academics ==
Roxbury Community College is accredited by the New England Commission of Higher Education.

== Athletics ==
Sports offered at RCC include: Men's Basketball, Women's Basketball, Men's Soccer, Men's Indoor Track and Field, Women's Indoor Track and Field, Men's Outdoor Track and Field, Men's Baseball; and Women's Outdoor Track and Field.

== Notable alumni and faculty ==
- Marita Golden, African American novelist, professor
- Calvin Hicks, African American journalist, activist, music educator
- David Updike, professor, author, and son of John Updike

== Gallery ==
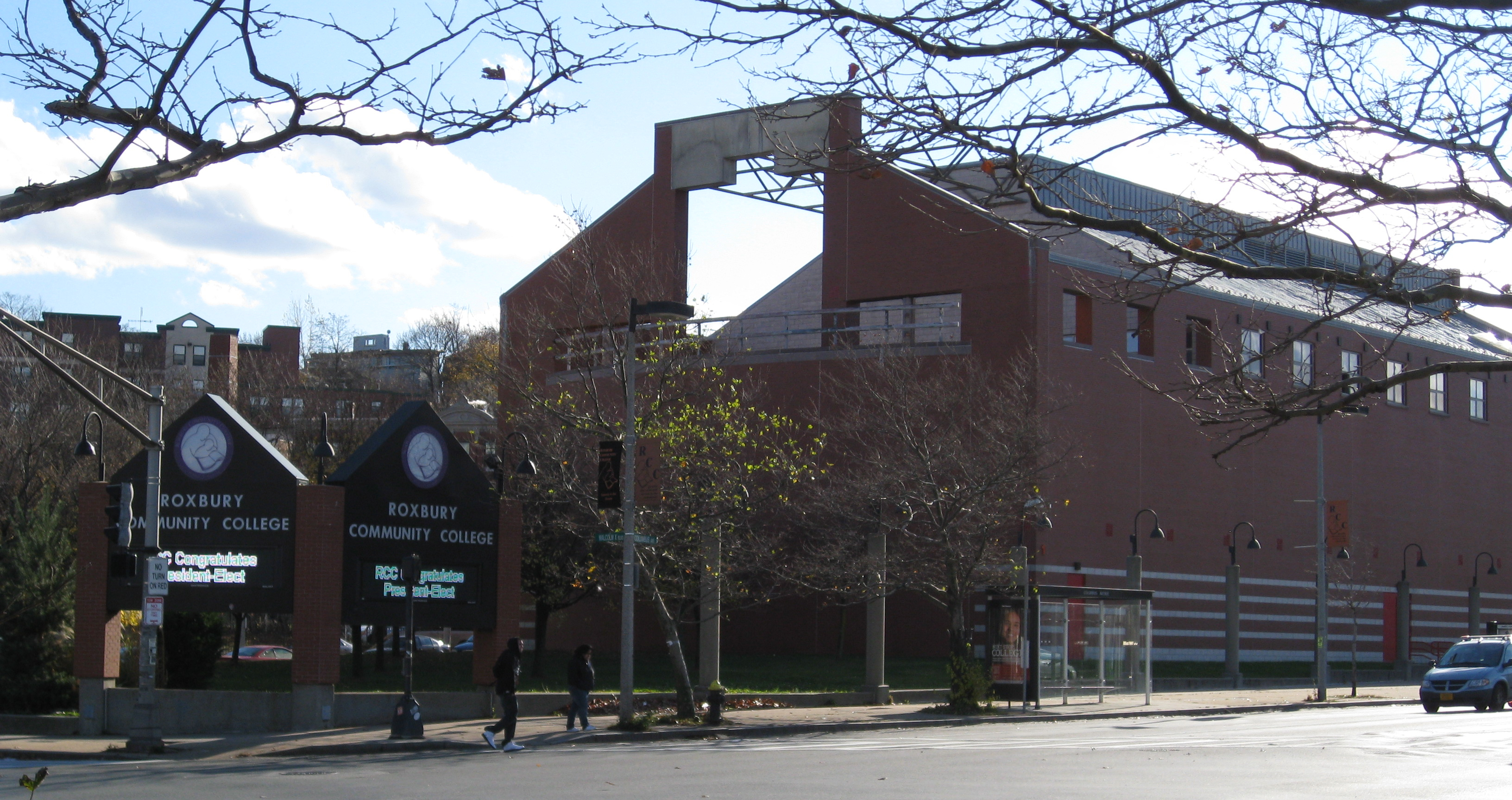

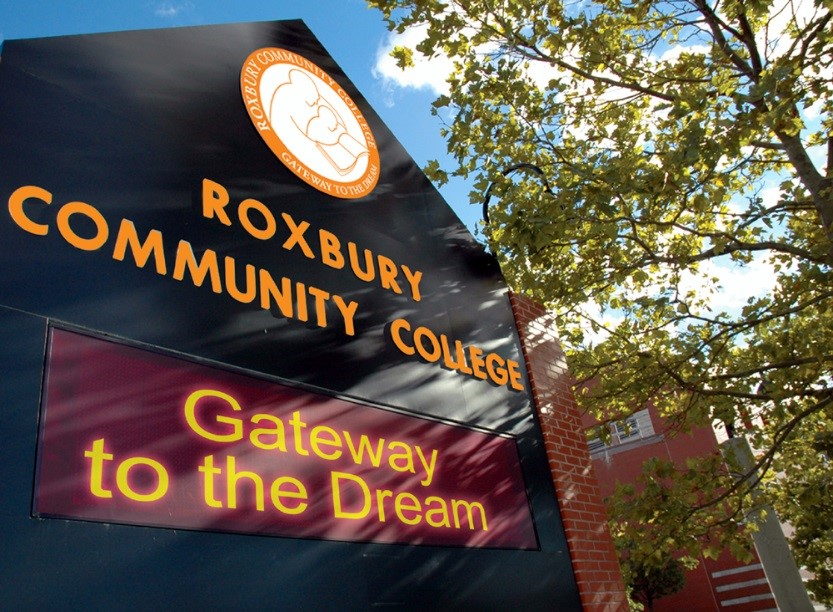

== See also ==
- List of colleges and universities in Massachusetts
