= Dartmouth College fraternities and sororities =

Dartmouth College is host to many fraternities and sororities, and a significant percentage of the undergraduate student body is active in Greek life. In the fall of 2022, 35 percent of male students belonged to a fraternity, and 36 percent of female students belonged to a sorority. Greek organizations at Dartmouth provide both social and residential opportunities for students and are the only single-sex residential option on campus. Greek organizations at Dartmouth do not provide dining options, as regular meal service has been banned in Greek houses since 1909.

Social fraternities at Dartmouth College grew out of a tradition of student literary societies that began in the late eighteenth and early nineteenth centuries. The first social fraternities were founded in 1842 and rapidly expanded to include the active participation of over half of the student body. Fraternities at Dartmouth built dedicated residence and meeting halls in the early 1900s and 1920s, and then struggled to survive the lean years of the 1930s. Dartmouth College was among the first higher education institutions to desegregate fraternity houses in the 1950s and was involved in the movement to create coeducational Greek houses in the 1970s. Sororities were introduced to campus in 1977.

As of 2025, Dartmouth College extends official recognition to fifteen all-male fraternities, eleven all-female sororities, and three gender-inclusive Greek houses. The Greek houses are largely governed through three independent councils, the Interfraternity Council, the Inter-Sorority Council, and the Gender-Inclusive Greek Council. Dartmouth College has three cultural interest fraternities and three cultural interest sororities, which are governed through two additional councils: the National Pan-Hellenic Council and the Multicultural Greek Council. A chapter of the Phi Beta Kappa honor society is active, but there are no active professional fraternity chapters at Dartmouth College.

== History ==
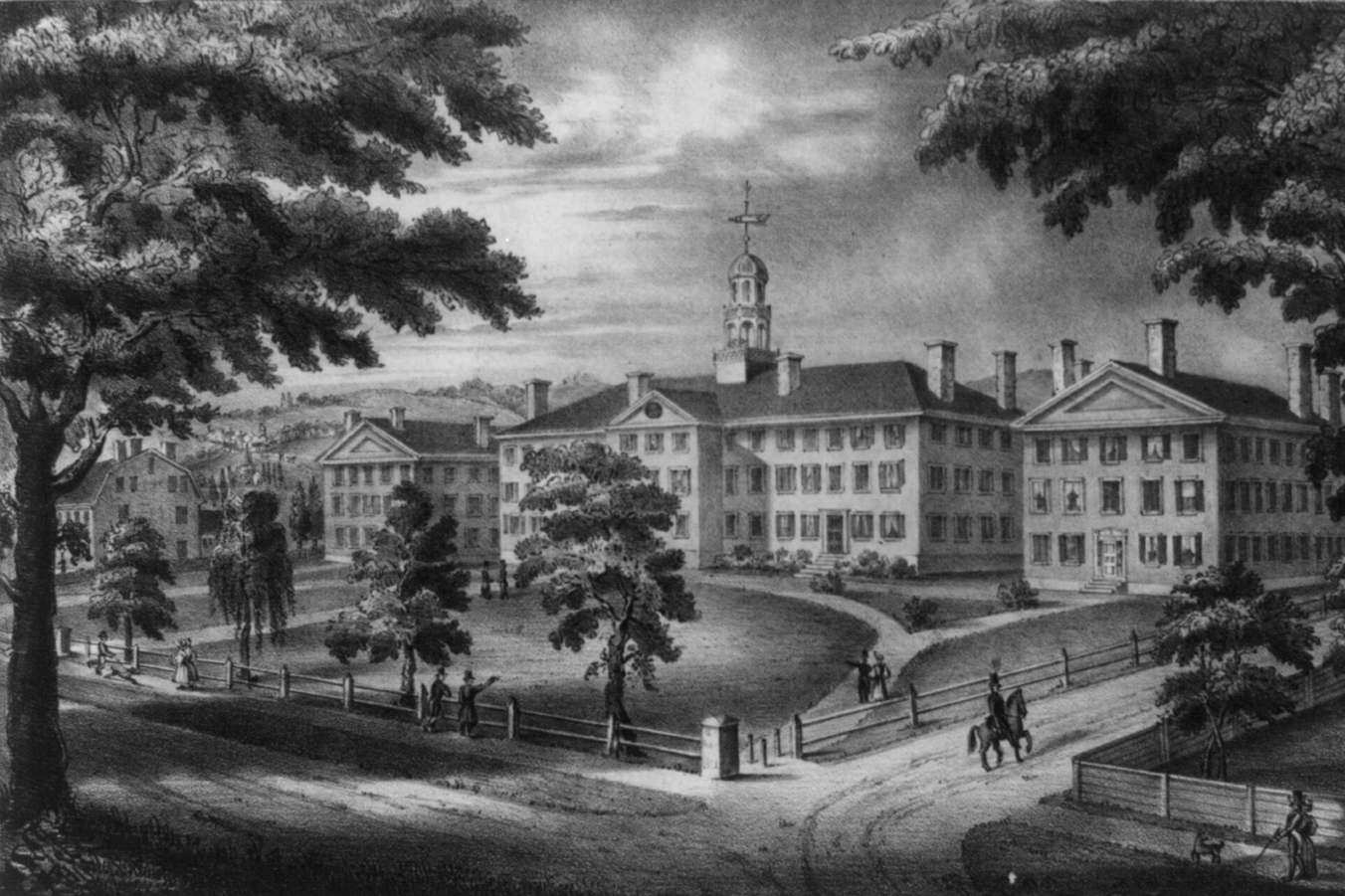
Dartmouth Hall, circa 1834

Social fraternities at Dartmouth College grew out of a tradition of student literary societies that began in the late eighteenth and early nineteenth centuries. The first such society at Dartmouth, the Social Friends, was formed in 1783. A rival organization, called the United Fraternity, was founded in 1786. A chapter of Phi Beta Kappa was established at Dartmouth in 1787, and counted among its members Daniel Webster, class of 1801. These organizations were, in large part, the only social life available to students at the college. The organizations hosted debates on a variety of topics not encountered in the curriculum of the day and amassed large libraries of titles not found in the official College library. Both Social Friends and the United Fraternity created libraries in Dartmouth Hall and met in a room called Society Hall inside Dartmouth Hall. In 1815, the college intervened in the hotly contested recruitment battle between the Social Friends and the United Fraternity by restricting each society to recruit only from separate halves of the new student class. In 1825, the college began simply assigning new students to one society or the other. Interest in the literary societies declined in the 1830s and 1840s. The college library and instructional curriculum had expanded to include much of what the literary societies had supported, and new Greek letter societies began to appear on campus.

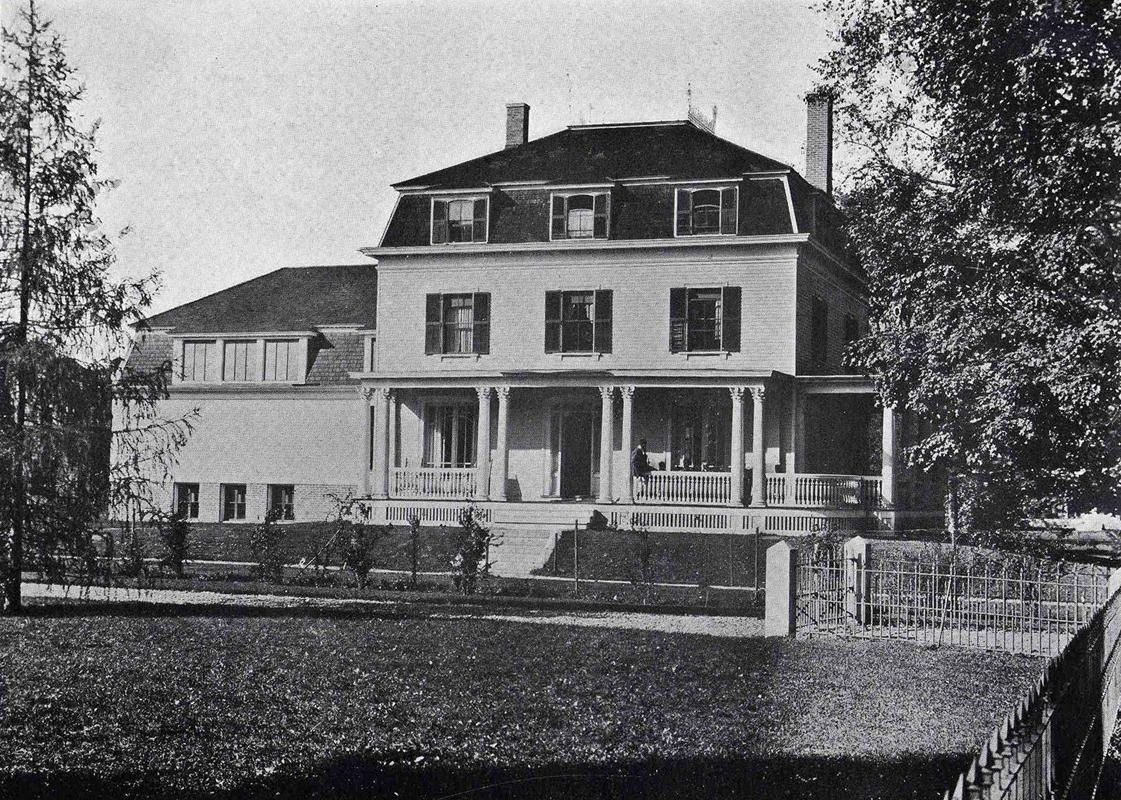
Kappa Kappa Kappa occupied its second chapter house at 22 North College Street from 1894 to 1924. The fraternity added the "goat room" (meeting room) at the rear.

In 1841, two factions of the United Fraternity split off from the literary society. One of the new societies called itself Omega Phi and on May 10, 1842, obtained a charter as the Zeta chapter of Psi Upsilon. The other faction to split from the United Fraternity organized itself on July 13, 1842, as Kappa Kappa Kappa, a local fraternity. More Greek organizations were founded, and by 1855, 64% of students, mostly upperclassmen, were members of the Greek letter societies on campus. Initially, the original Greek letter societies would not extend invitations to membership to first-year students. Two Greek letter organizations were created exclusively for freshmen: Kappa Sigma Epsilon and Delta Kappa. These societies would dissolve in 1883 when the fraternities of the upper classes began to pledge freshmen. A chapter of Phi Beta Kappa survived at Dartmouth, but by the 1830s had established its role as a strictly literary society by dropping requirements of secrecy for membership and activities. The new, social Greek organizations distinguished themselves from Phi Beta Kappa and the previous literary societies in several ways. The new fraternities were self-selective and exclusive. Each organization developed its own secret rituals and procedures. Most societies began to invest in creating their meeting halls, either upstairs rooms in buildings on Main Street or free-standing structures near campus. There were eleven active Greek organizations at Dartmouth College in 1900. (Note: The eleven fraternities active at Dartmouth College in 1900 were Alpha Alpha Omega, Alpha Delta Phi, Beta Theta Pi, Delta Kappa Epsilon, Zeta Psi, Theta Delta Chi, Kappa Kappa Kappa, Sigma Chi, Phi Delta Theta, Phi Kappa Psi, and Psi Upsilon.)

=== Expansion of the fraternity system ===
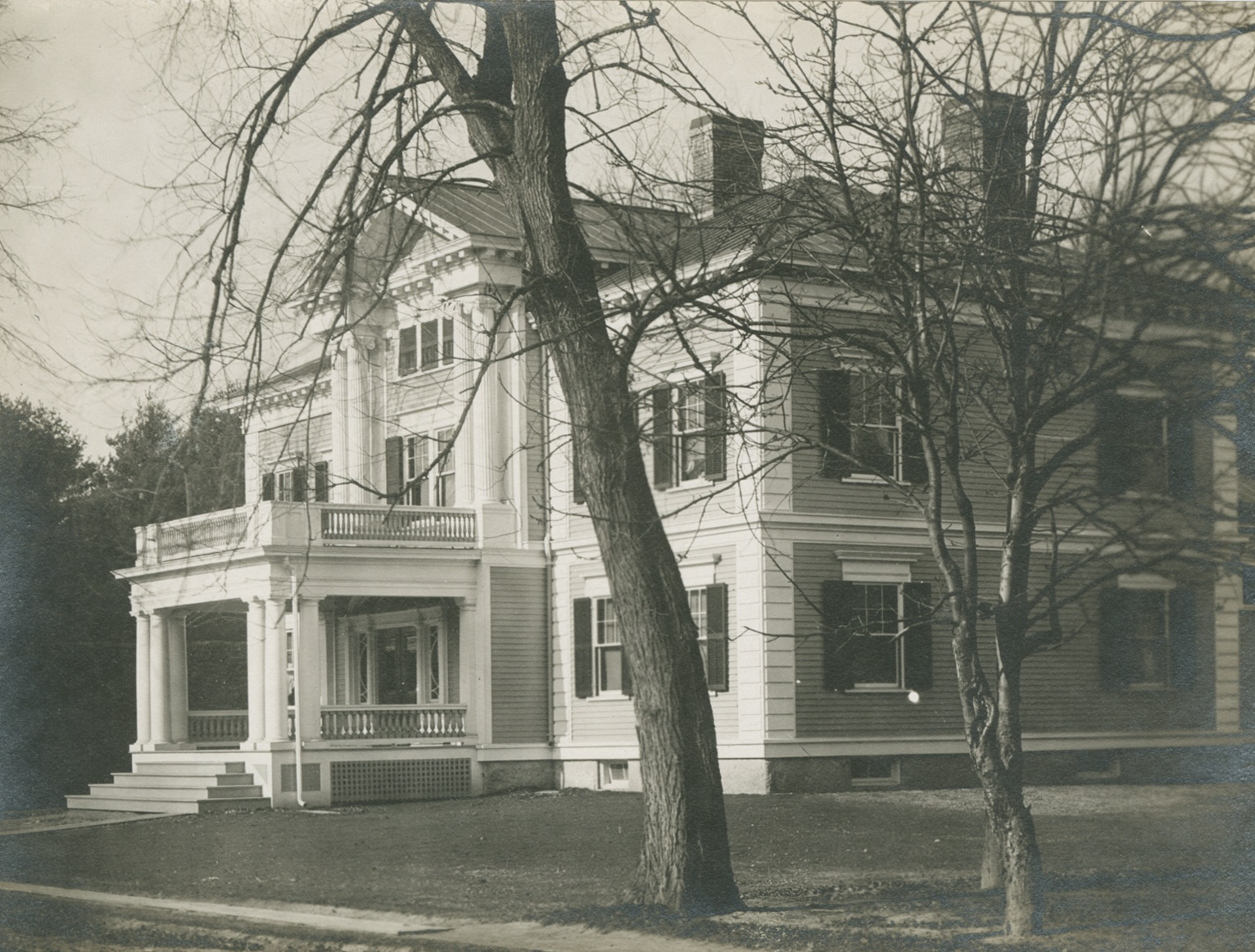
Dartmouth Beta chapter house, circa 1920, would later become home to the Tucker Foundation.

The fortunes of the fraternity system at Dartmouth followed a boom and bust pattern in the early twentieth century. Several organizations purchased frame houses or built their own between 1898 and 1907, including Beta Theta Pi, Kappa Kappa Kappa, Phi Delta Alpha, Psi Upsilon, and Delta Tau Delta. The economic expansion of the 1920s created a boom in the fortunes of the fraternities, allowing many to build new brick residences near campus, including Zeta Psi, Kappa Kappa Kappa, Phi Sigma Kappa, Sigma Nu, Sigma Alpha Epsilon, Chi Phi, Theta Delta Chi, Phi Gamma Delta, Sigma Chi, and Gamma Delta Chi. It was during this period that Webster Avenue developed as "fraternity row". The new residences were built without significant dining facilities, as the Trustees of the college had banned fraternities from serving regular meals in their chapter houses and had limited the number of resident brothers by the fall semester of 1909. College administrators also challenged the fraternities to become more engaged in College life and less focused on their fraternity life during this time. College President Ernest Martin Hopkins personally decided to abolish freshman rush in 1924.

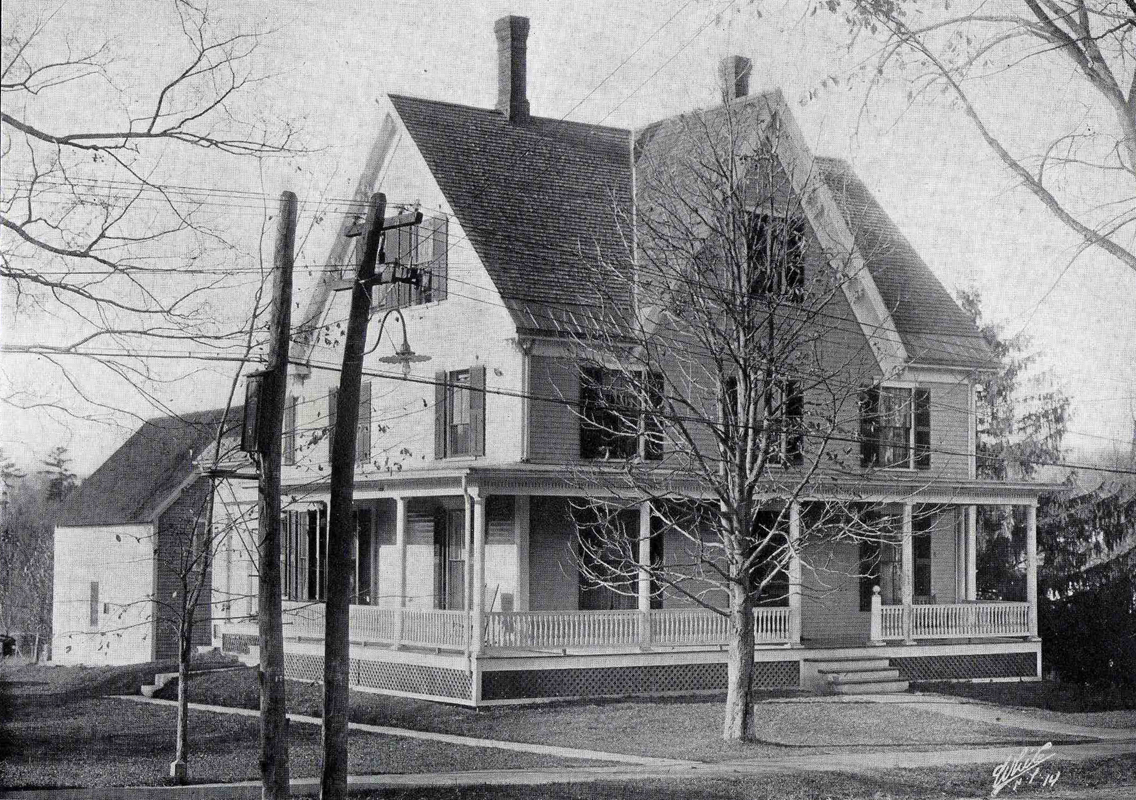
Delta Tau Delta chapter house, shown here circa 1915, would in 1960 become today's Bones Gate fraternity.

As did the nation, fraternities at Dartmouth went through difficult times during the Great Depression. The decade of the 1930s saw almost no building projects at all in the fraternity system, and many houses could no longer afford regular maintenance. One of the great tragedies at Dartmouth College occurred on a winter night in 1934 when nine members of Theta Chi died from carbon monoxide poisoning after a metal chimney on a dilapidated coal furnace in the basement of the chapter house broke in the night. In 1935, Dartmouth historian and professor Leon Burr Richardson asserted in a survey that, in light of the national suffering, the fraternity chapters should ask themselves if they had "any excuse for existence." Four fraternities dissolved during the Great Depression (Alpha Sigma Phi, Alpha Tau Omega, Lambda Chi Alpha, and Sigma Alpha Mu), and two (Phi Kappa Sigma and Alpha Chi Rho) merged to pool scarce resources to survive. All of the surviving fraternities closed for the duration of World War II, as the campus was largely (although not exclusively) used to educate, train, and house United States Navy sailors and United States Marine Corps in the V-12 Navy College Training Program.

The fraternities of Dartmouth College were directly involved in the Civil Rights Movement of the 1950s, expanding and popularizing an issue that had first appeared as a result of WWII, where the service branches became largely integrated. In the immediate post-war period, for the first time, poor, as well as minority students, sought higher education in significant numbers, aided by the GI Bill. Students in the Northeast, the Midwest, and the West were quicker to adopt this cause; southern schools followed. In 1952, Dartmouth's Alpha Theta chapter of Theta Chi, a group dating to 1921, was derecognized by its national organization over a dispute regarding minority membership. The Dartmouth chapter was reorganized as a local fraternity named Alpha Theta. A campus-wide referendum held in 1954 on the issue of desegregation of fraternities resulted in a majority in favor of requiring fraternities on campus to eliminate racially discriminatory membership policies by the year 1960, and to secede from national groups that retained such policies in their charters. This became a binding obligation imposed on the fraternities by the college administration, and several fraternities at Dartmouth dissociated from their national organizations, including the chapters of Phi Sigma Kappa (originally Tau chapter (1905)) which withdrew in 1956, Delta Tau Delta (originally Gamma Gamma chapter (1901)) which withdrew in 1960, Phi Delta Theta (originally New Hampshire Alpha chapter (1884)) which withdrew in 1960, Sigma Chi (originally Eta Eta chapter (1892)) which withdrew in 1960, and Sigma Nu (originally Delta Beta chapter (1907)) which withdrew in 1963 but has since been re-established. Ironically, these and other national fraternities moved fairly quickly to remove bias clauses, in comparison to other institutions of society; thus the Dartmouth chapters which were at the forefront of agitating for these changes won the battle, even as they left their former organizations.

Other national social changes affected Greek societies at Dartmouth in the 1960s and 1970s. Many began to question the value of belonging to a national fraternal organization, spurred perhaps by questions over the cost of national fees or services. The Dartmouth chapters of Alpha Chi Rho (originally Phi Nu chapter (1919)) which withdrew in 1963, Chi Phi (originally Chi chapter (1902)) which withdrew in 1968, Delta Upsilon (originally Dartmouth chapter (1926)) which withdrew in 1966, Phi Gamma Delta (originally Delta Nu chapter (1901)) which withdrew in 1965, Phi Kappa Psi (originally New Hampshire Alpha chapter (1896)) which withdrew in 1967, and Sigma Phi Epsilon (originally New Hampshire Alpha chapter (1909)) which withdrew in 1967, all disaffiliated from their national fraternities in the 1960s. Sigma Phi Epsilon's chapter would later re-affiliate with the fraternity in 1981. But during the turbulent late 1960s, fraternities were viewed by many as anachronistic, a theme that culminated in 1967 when the faculty voted 67 to 16 to adopt a proposal to abolish fraternities at Dartmouth. This proposal was rejected by the Board of Trustees.

=== Coeducation to the present ===
Coeducation would dramatically change all social life at Dartmouth College, including the fraternity system. The college began admitting women as full-time students in 1972. By the fall of 1973, five local fraternities (Alpha Theta, Foley House, The Tabard, Phi Tau, and Phi Sigma Psi) had all decided to adopt a coeducational membership policy and admit women as full members. The first sorority on campus, Sigma Kappa, was founded in 1977. Many alumni expressed strong concerns that the need for housing for new sororities would inevitably lead to financial pressure and the possible dissolution of existing fraternities at the college. In response, the Trustees imposed a moratorium limiting the campus to six recognized sororities. Converting from an all-male to a coeducational membership policy was not enough to save at least one Greek organization on campus. In 1981, the Harold Parmington Foundation reorganized itself as a new coeducational fraternity Delta Psi Delta. Still, the organization never attracted many new members and was finally forced to dissolve in the spring of 1991. In addition, Foley House disassociated from the Greek system in the fall of 1984, transitioning into an affinity house as part of the college's residential living programs. It moved off Webster Avenue to a new location on West Street (where it is still in operation as of the 2013–2014 academic year).

During the 1980s and 1990s, college administrators introduced new initiatives to hold the Greek organizations on campus more accountable for their actions and to offer more social alternatives to the predominantly single-sex Greek system. In 1982, the administration announced that Greek organizations would have to comply with "minimum standards", enforced through annual reviews, to remain in good standing with the college. These standards included health and safety regulations regarding the conditions of the Greek houses and requirements for Greek-sponsored activities deemed beneficial to the college community at large. The college introduced Undergraduate Societies to campus in 1993, as a residential and social alternative to Greek organizations. Similar to the Greek houses in many respects, Undergraduate Societies were required to have open, coeducational membership policies. Panarchy voted to change its status to an undergraduate society and was joined the following year by a newly formed society, called Amarna. In the fall of 1993, Student Assembly President Andrew Beebe, class of 1993, argued in favor of the coeducation of the entire Greek system in his remarks at fall Convocation. During that same academic term, College President James O. Freedman predicted that the Greek system at Dartmouth would be coeducational within 10 years.

In 1999, the college administration announced a "Residential and Social Life Initiative" to improve campus life. Speculation that all single-sex fraternities and sororities would be required to adopt coeducational membership policies led to intense campus debate. In a survey conducted by The Dartmouth newspaper, 49% of the student body responded, and 83% of those respondents were in favor of retaining a single-sex Greek system at Dartmouth. In 2005, the school stated that 1,785 students were members of a fraternity, sorority, or gender-inclusive Greek house, accounting for about 43 percent of all students, or about 60 percent of the eligible student body. In a December 2006 interview, College President Jim Wright admitted that it had been "a serious mistake" to announce the Student Life Initiative in the manner in which it was presented to the campus, but expressed that in his opinion, "the Greek system at Dartmouth now is stronger than it's ever been."

In the fall of 2022, 35 percent of male students belonged to a fraternity, and 36 percent of students belonged to a sorority.

== Fraternities ==
The single-sex male-only fraternities at Dartmouth College are largely organized and represented by the college through the Interfraternity Council (IFC). The Interfraternity Council is a student-led governance organization that assists its member Greek organizations with finances, public relations, programming, judicial administration, recruitment, and academic achievement. Alpha Phi Alpha is not a member of the IFC, but is a member of the National Pan-Hellenic Council. Lambda Upsilon Lambda is also not a member of the IFC, but is a member of the National Association of Latino Fraternal Organizations.

=== Alpha Phi Alpha ===
The Theta Zeta chapter of Alpha Phi Alpha (ΑΦΑ) was founded as the first historically African-American fraternity at Dartmouth College in 1972. The first members of the fraternity traveled to Boston, Massachusetts on the weekends of the 1971 spring academic term to attend pledge events at the Sigma chapter. The Dartmouth chapter was chartered as the 381st chapter of Alpha Phi Alpha on May 12, 1972. Early chapter meetings on campus were held in both the Choates dormitories and Cutter-Shabazz Hall. The fraternity secured its own house in 1982, a duplex structure that, since renovated, today houses the Delta Delta Delta sorority. Facing a smaller membership, the fraternity decided to relocate to a smaller house near the western end of Webster Avenue in the late 1980s, and in 1992, the fraternity again relocated to College-owned apartment housing. The Dartmouth chapter of Alpha Phi Alpha sponsors an annual step performance known as the Green Key StepShow. Notable alumni of the chapter include National Football League all-star Reggie Williams, class of 1976, and former executive vice president of baseball operations in Major League Baseball, Jimmie Lee Solomon, class of 1978.

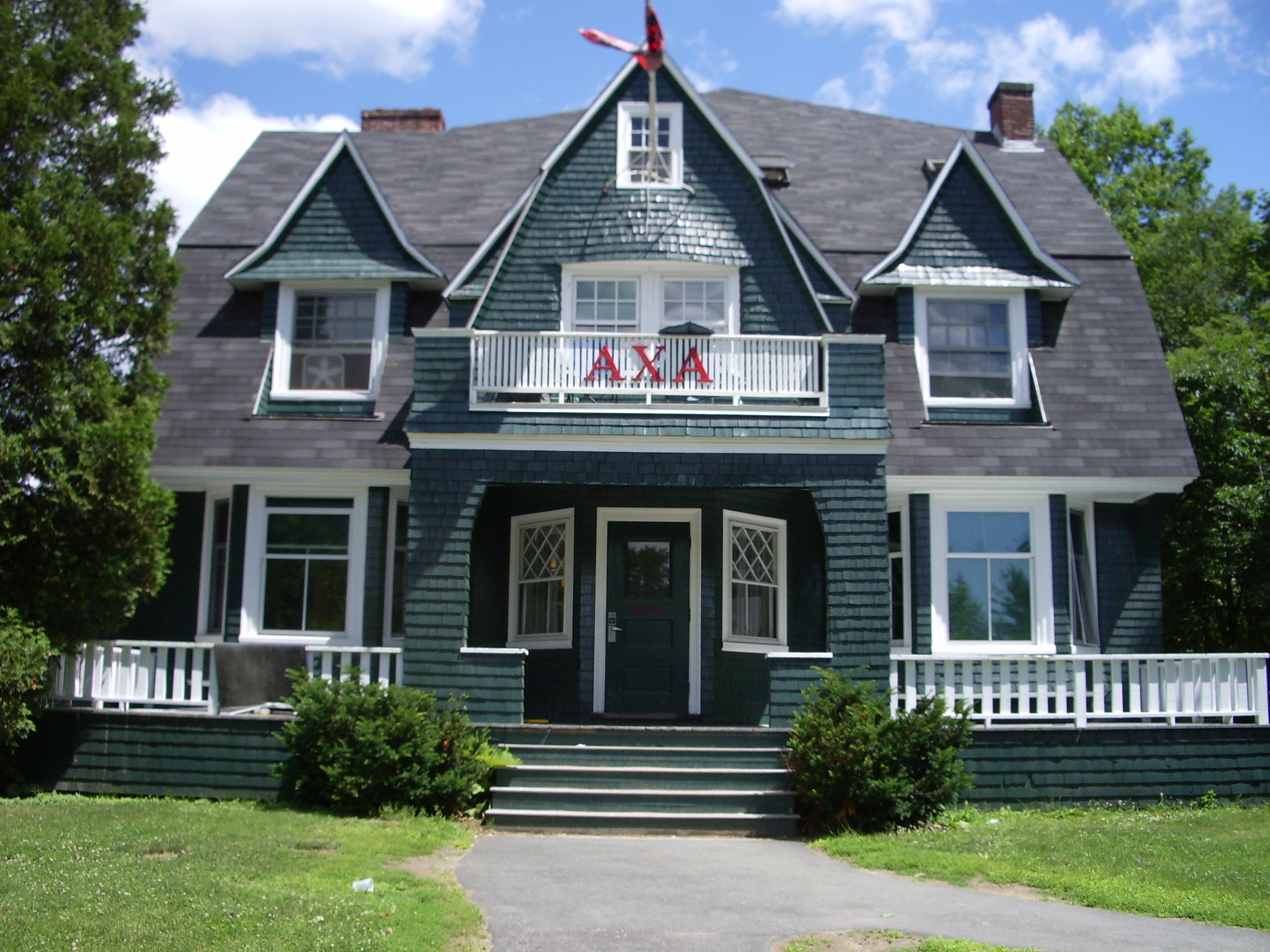
Alpha Chi Alpha chapter house, 2007

=== Alpha Chi Alpha ===
Alpha Chi Alpha (ΑΧΑ), commonly called Alpha Chi, was founded in 1956 as the Phi Nu chapter of Alpha Chi Rho, a national fraternal organization. A previous Phi Nu chapter of Alpha Chi Rho at Dartmouth had merged with the Kappa chapter of Phi Kappa Sigma in 1935 to become Gamma Delta Chi, a local fraternity still in existence at Dartmouth. The second Phi Nu chapter of Alpha Chi Rho is unrelated to the first chapter. The men of Alpha Chi Rho again broke away from the national group in 1963 and became a local fraternity named Alpha Chi Alpha. The Dartmouth chapter objected to a clause in the national fraternity organization's constitution that required all Alpha Chi Rho brothers to "accept Jesus as their lord and savior." The land and houses used by the Alpha Chi Alpha fraternity are owned by the college. Dartmouth invested $1.3 million in renovations completed in the fall of 2004, which included the razing of the "Barn" structure that was used as social space by the brothers of Alpha Chi Alpha to make way for a newly expanded basement and main floor area. Renovations on the Alpha Chi Alpha physical plant were completed in 2005.

=== Beta Alpha Omega ===
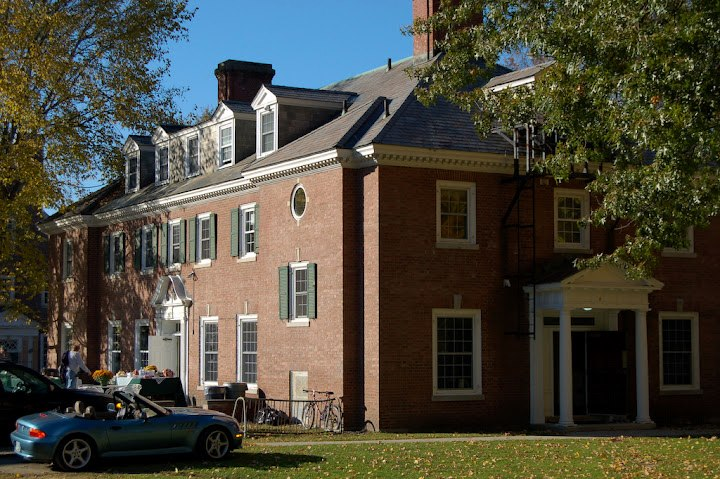
Beta Alpha Omega chapter house, 2009

Beta Alpha Omega (ΒΑΩ), commonly called Beta, is a local fraternity that was founded and recognized in the fall of 2008. Beta Alpha Omega is located at 6 Webster Avenue on Dartmouth College's campus. It is home to over 90 undergrads, known for their diverse interests in athletics, leadership, community, and campus life. Dartmouth Beta is not a national fraternity and no longer retains an affiliation with Beta Theta Pi.

In July 2024, a student and Beta Alpha Omega member Won Jang was found dead in the Connecticut River after having attended a social gathering between Beta and the Alpha Phi sorority. Dartmouth College has suspended Beta Alpha Omega and Alpha Phi. On April 17th, 2026, the student newspaper The Dartmouth announced that Beta Alpha Omega would be participating in the Interfraternity Council recruitment for first time since their suspension in the Fall of 2026. It will be returning with an alcohol suspension in Fall 2026 and Winter 2027 and probation in Spring 2027 "before returning to full active status in summer 2027."

=== Bones Gate ===
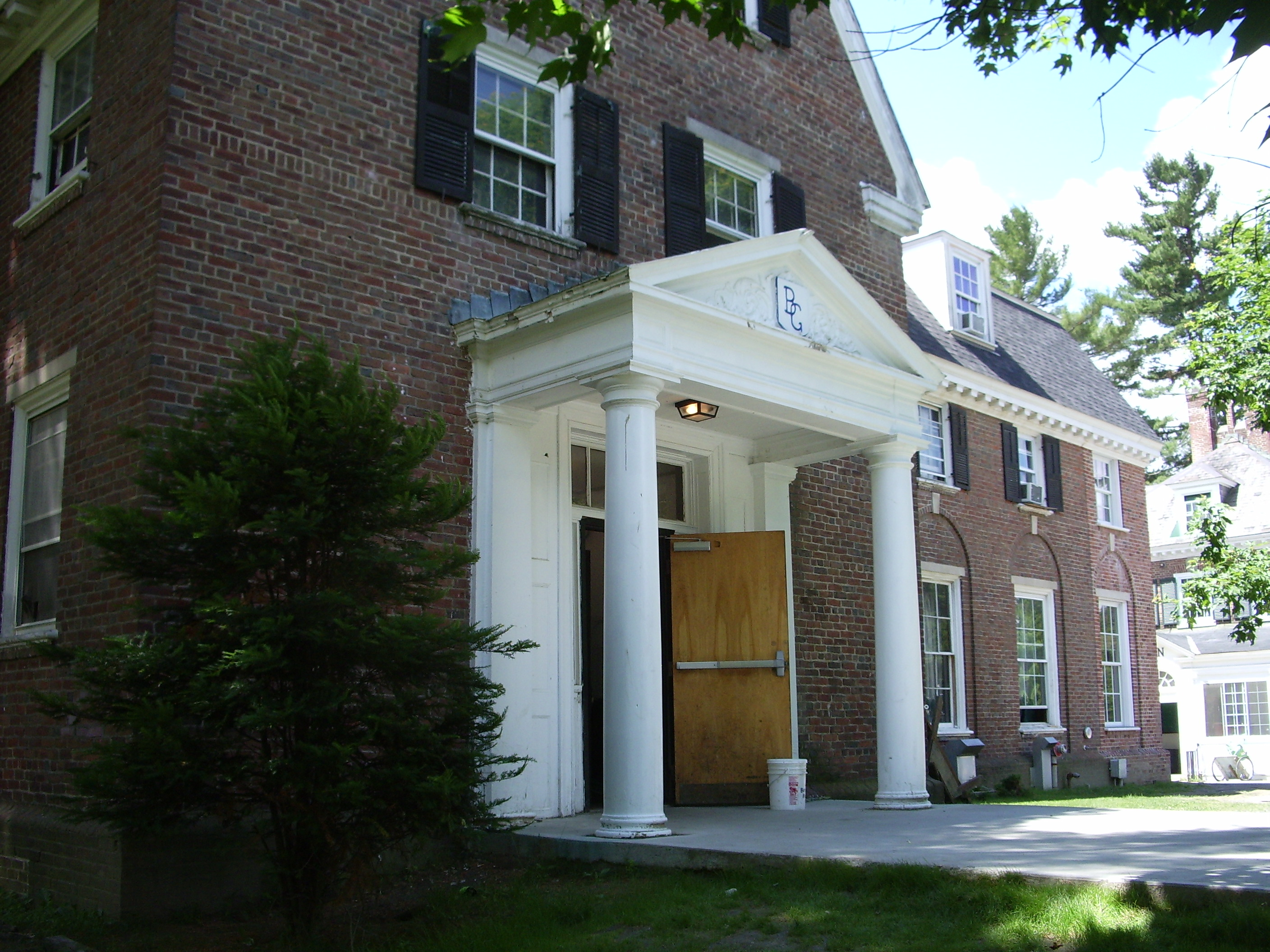
Bones Gate house, 2007

Bones Gate, known as BG, was founded in 1901 as the Gamma Gamma chapter of the Delta Tau Delta fraternity. In 1960 the Gamma Gamma chapter dissociated from Delta Tau Delta when the national organization sought to officially bar minorities from membership. The new local fraternity at Dartmouth went unnamed until 1962, when the brothers adopted the name Bones Gate after an English tavern well known to the members.

=== Gamma Delta Chi ===
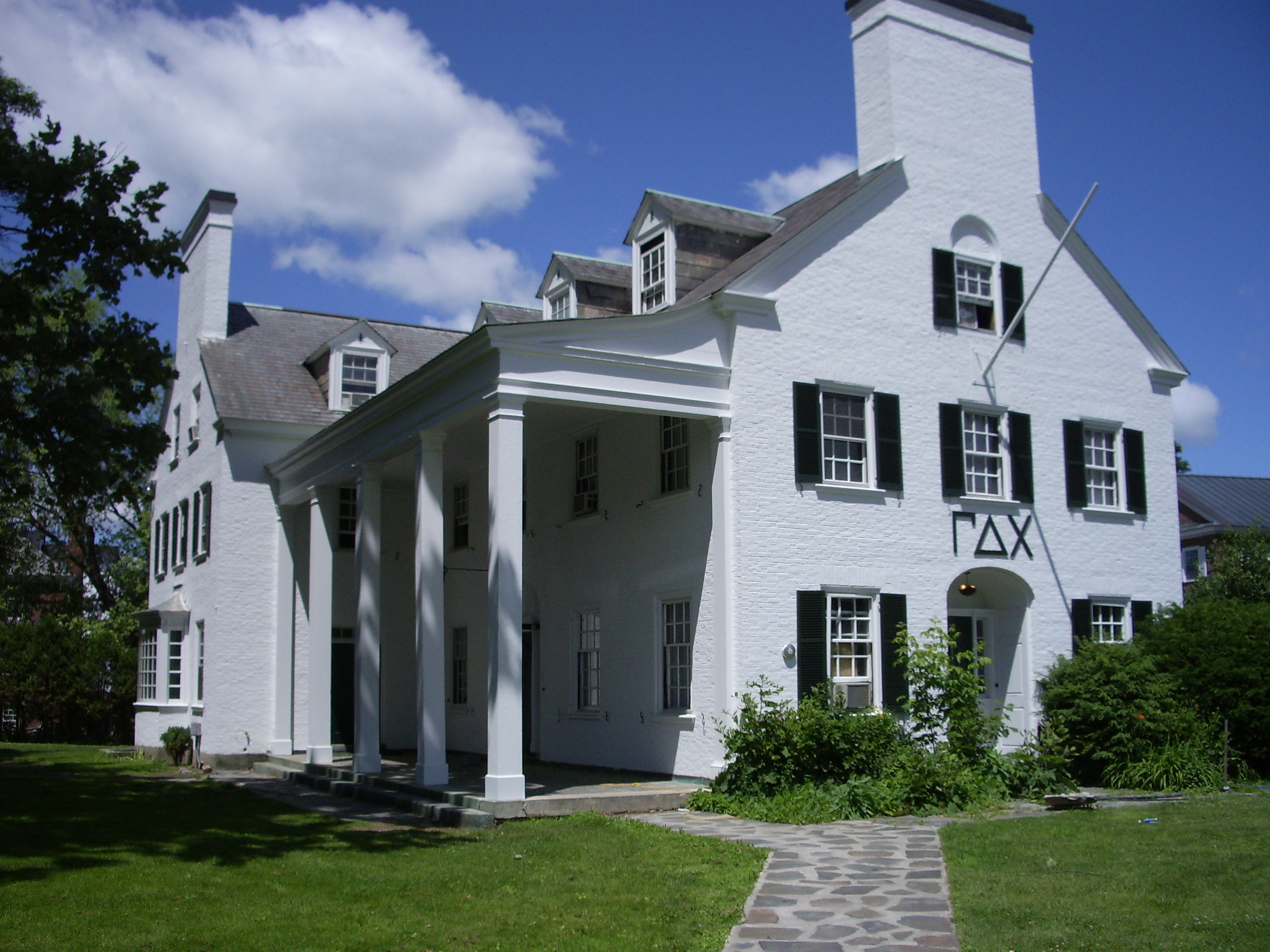
Gamma Delta Chi chapter house, 2007

Gamma Delta Chi (ΓΔΧ) can trace its history to two fraternities on the Dartmouth College campus, Phi Kappa Sigma and Alpha Chi Rho. Gamma Delta Epsilon, a local fraternity, was founded in 1908, disbanded in 1912, but was reformed in 1921. In 1928, the Gamma Delta Epsilon house sought to establish itself as a chapter of a national fraternity and obtained a charter from the Phi Kappa Sigma national fraternity, becoming its Kappa chapter. Epsilon Kappa Alpha was established as a local fraternity on the Dartmouth campus in 1915. As with Gamma Delta Epsilon, Epsilon Kappa Alpha sought to become a chapter of a national fraternity and was granted a charter as the Phi Nu chapter of Alpha Chi Rho in 1918. The Dartmouth chapters of Alpha Chi Rho and Phi Kappa Sigma found themselves in similar financial situations in 1934. Both chapters owned prime lots near campus that lacked adequate residential structures. The two fraternities decided to share their resources and, in 1935, merged to become a new local fraternity, Gamma Delta Chi. The lot formerly owned by Alpha Chi Rho was sold to the Church of Christ at Dartmouth, where a new church building was constructed, and the revenue from the land sale supported the construction of a new house at Gamma Delta Chi's current location. (The Alpha Chi Rho national fraternity would later re-establish a Phi Nu chapter at Dartmouth in 1956 as a separate fraternity from Gamma Delta Chi. This second Phi Nu chapter would dissociate from the Alpha Chi Rho national in 1963 to become a local fraternity named Alpha Chi Alpha.)

=== Zeta Psi ===
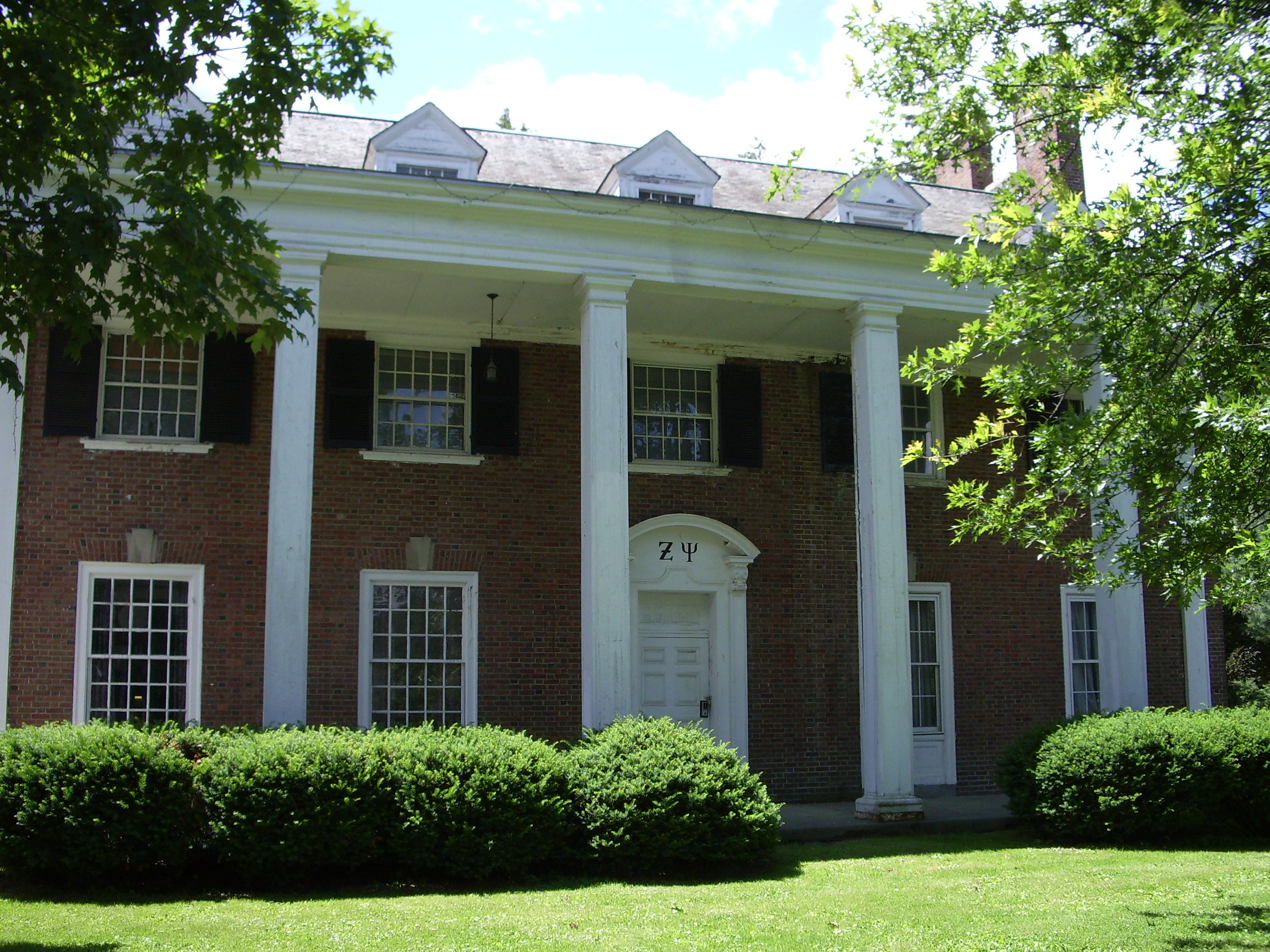
Zeta Psi chapter house, 2007

Zeta Psi (ΖΨ), commonly called Zete, at Dartmouth College was founded in 1853 as the Psi Epsilon chapter of the national fraternity. Zeta Psi was the fifth fraternity founded at Dartmouth and occupies a central location on the college's fraternity row at 8 Webster Avenue.

Zeta Psi's early years were marked by two periods of dormancy, the first coinciding with the Civil War between 1863 until a brief restoration in 1871. But this group failed again in 1873. The chapter was permanently restored in 1920. More recently it lost formal recognition on behavioral claims in 2001, continuing independently until 2006, and reached agreement with the college to once again be restored as a chapter in good standing in 2009. During a two-year closure 2007–2009, alumni raised millions of dollars and the physical plant was entirely gutted and renovated, with a three-story addition being constructed on the west side of the house. At this time, the basement was enlarged.

=== Theta Delta Chi ===
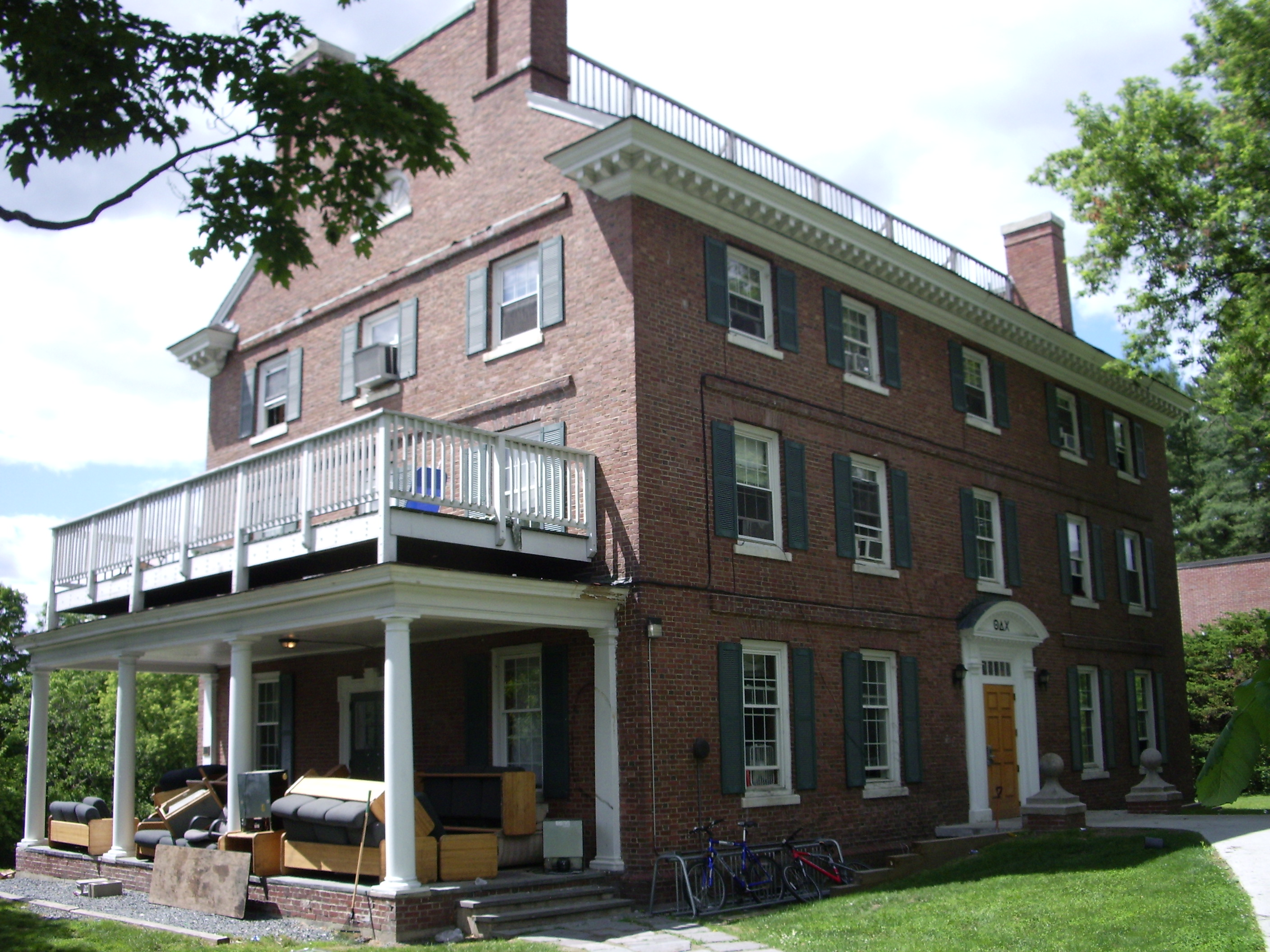
Theta Delta Chi chapter house, 2007

Theta Delta Chi (ΘΔΧ), commonly called Theta Delt and TDX, was founded at Dartmouth College in 1869 as the Omicron Deuteron charge (chapter) of the national fraternity and was the eighth fraternity founded at Dartmouth. Theta Delta Chi was the scene of a famous murder in June 1920. Henry Maroney, class of 1920, was shot to death in his room at Theta Delta Chi by Robert Meads, class of 1919. Meads was reportedly the central figure in a large-scale bootlegging operation at the college during the early years of Prohibition. An intoxicated Maroney reportedly stole a quart of Canadian whisky from Meads. Later that same night, Meads found Maroney in his room at the fraternity and shot him through the heart. Meads was convicted of a lesser charge of manslaughter and given a sentence of 15 to 20 years of hard labor. The sensational murder is reportedly the source of the nickname given to the Theta Delta Chi residence: the "Boom Boom Lodge". Theta Delta Chi has several distinguished alumni, including Robert Frost, who attended Dartmouth for a time in 1892.

=== Kappa Pi Kappa ===
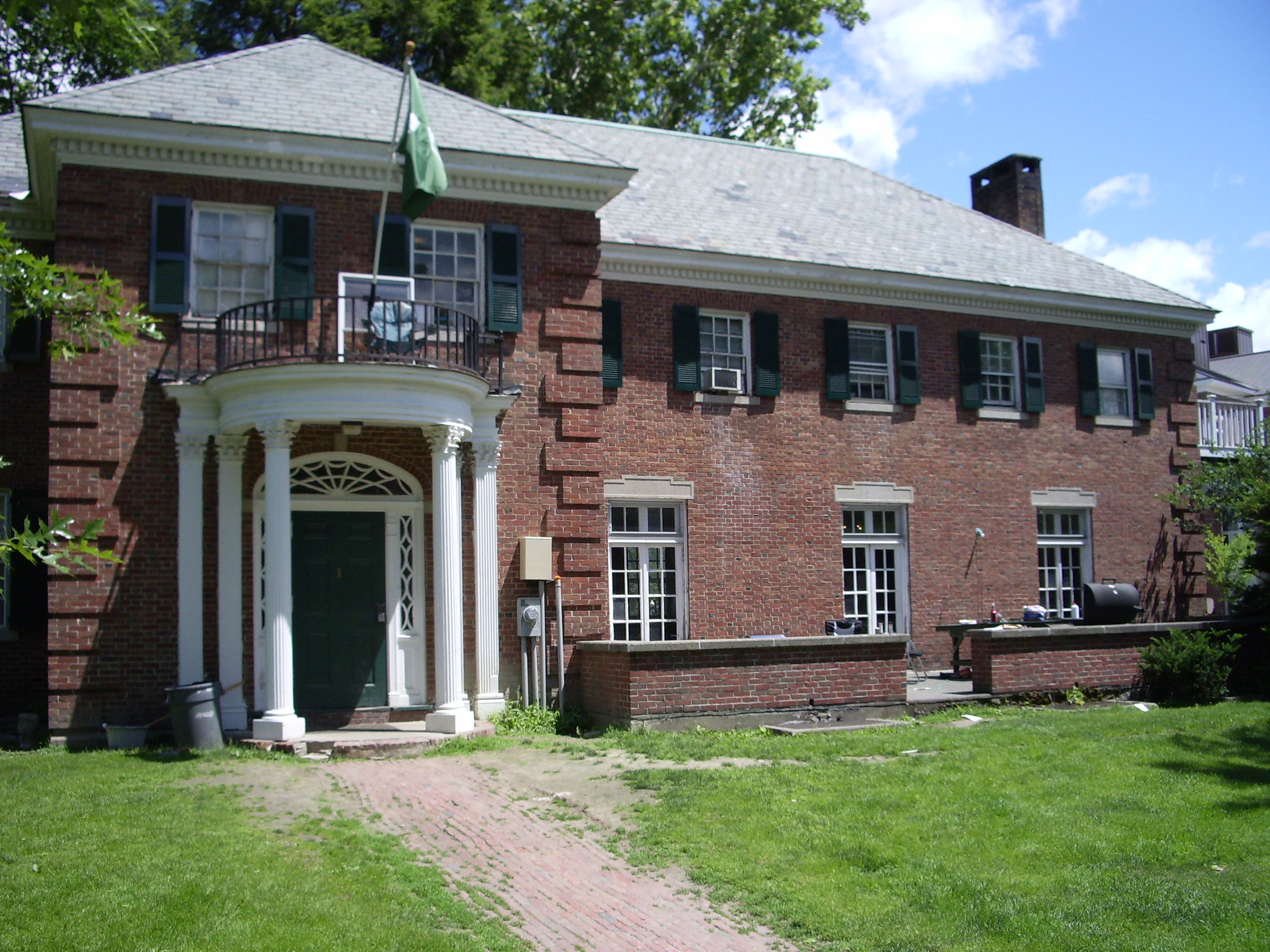
Kappa Pi Kappa chapter house, 2007

Kappa Pi Kappa (ΚΠΚ), commonly called Pi Kap, is a local fraternity founded on July 13, 1842. The organization was known as Kappa Kappa Kappa (ΚΚΚ, usually called Tri Kap) from its founding until 2022 (except for a short period from 1992 to 1995). The organization has no affiliation with the Ku Klux Klan, which was founded after Kappa Kappa Kappa was founded and unfortunately adopted the Latin initials ΚΚΚ, similar to the Greek alphabet letters Kappa Kappa Kappa. According to legend, Kappa Kappa Kappa sued the Ku Klux Klan for defamation of name but lost because the judge ruled that the similarity in the initials of the organizations was a sheer coincidence. Kappa Pi Kappa was the first society at Dartmouth to have a freestanding fraternity building in Hanover and one of the first in the country.

=== Sigma Alpha Epsilon ===
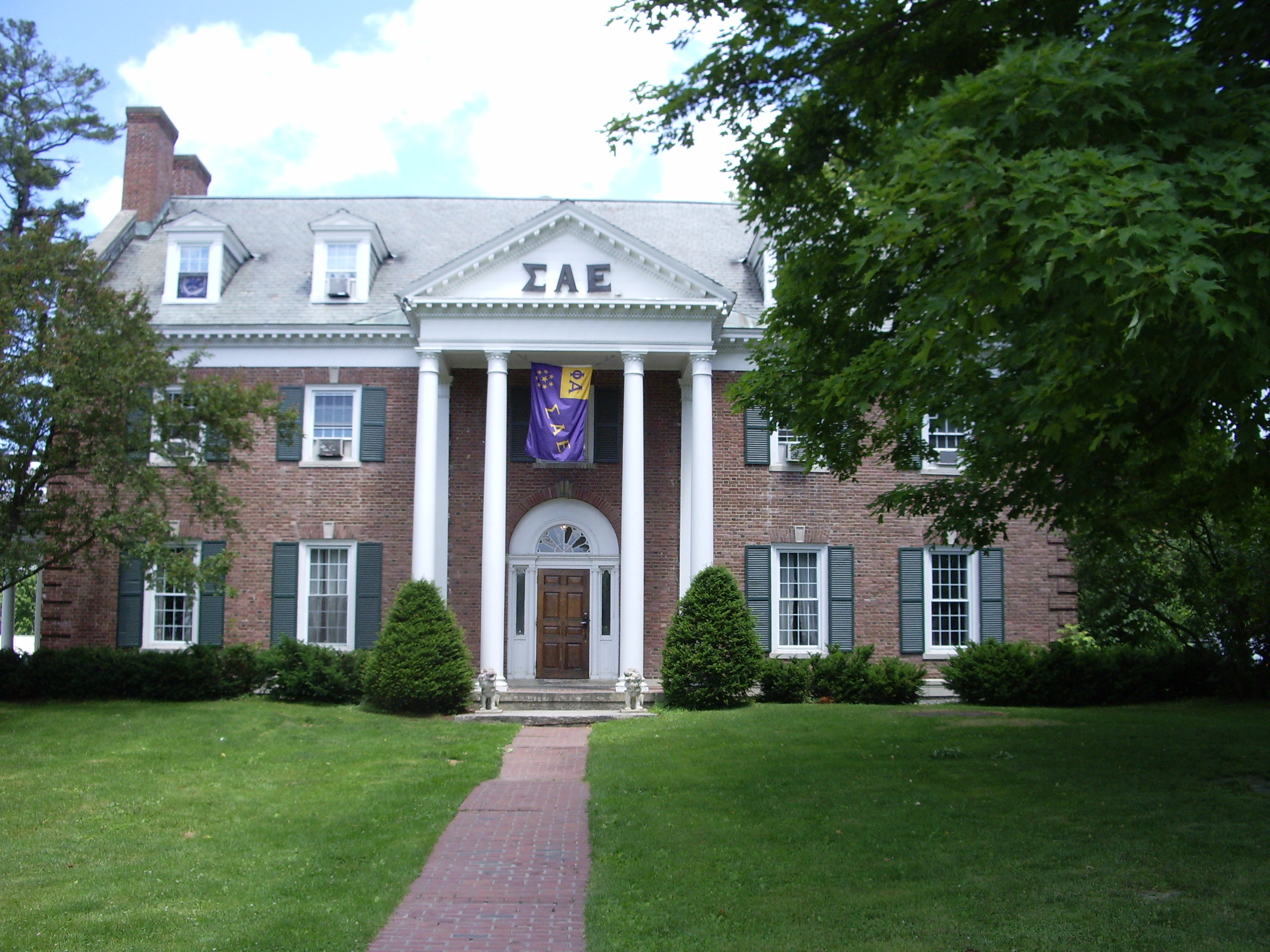
Sigma Alpha Epsilon chapter house, 2007

Sigma Alpha Epsilon (ΣΑΕ), commonly called SAE, at Dartmouth College was founded in 1903 as a local fraternity named Chi Tau Kappa. In 1908, the fraternity sought to associate itself with a national fraternity and was granted a charter from Sigma Alpha Epsilon to become the New Hampshire Alpha chapter. With funding support from the national organization, the fraternity acquired a house on School Street that had previously been the residence of a college professor. By 1916, the fraternity had moved to a wooden house on College Street north of the Green. The fraternity would replace the structure entirely with a new brick residence built between 1928 and 1931, one of the final fraternity building projects started on campus before the Great Depression. Sigma Alpha Epsilon members are encouraged by their national organization to emulate the tenets of "The True Gentleman", a statement written by John Walter Wayland. Notable alumni of the chapter include the United States Secretary of the Treasury and emeritus CEO of Goldman Sachs Henry Paulson (1968), benefactor to Dartmouth College, Barry MacLean (1960), and U.S. Senator Peter Fitzgerald (1982). Sigma Alpha Epsilon was de-recognized by Dartmouth College on February 4, 2016, but continued to operate independently, and was re-recognized by the College on July 1, 2026.

=== Sigma Lambda Beta ===
The Eta Zeta chapter of Sigma Lambda Beta International Fraternity, Inc (ΣΛΒ) was founded on May 17, 2025 and chartered on May 3, 2026. Sigma Lambda Beta is a Latino-based fraternity on campus and the only fraternity part of the Multicultural Greek Council. The interest group that would become Sigma Lambda Beta began organizing two years before its establishment by its eight founding members.

=== Sigma Nu ===
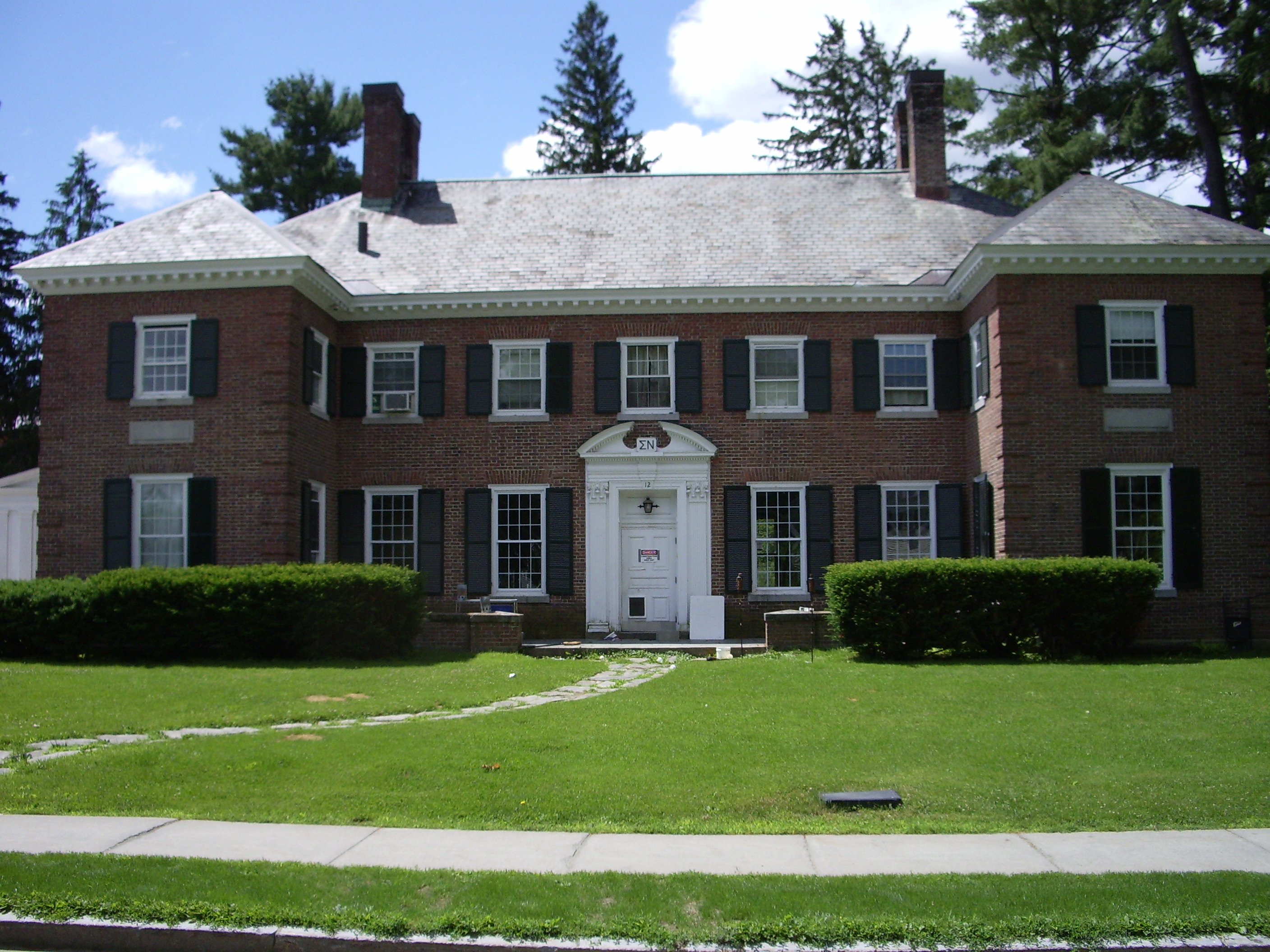
Sigma Nu chapter house, 2007

Sigma Nu (ΣΝ), commonly called Sig Nu, at Dartmouth College, was originally formed in 1903 as the Pukwana Club, an organization that was created as a reaction to the perceived elitism of Greek organizations at the time. The club's concept was based on the love for the traditions of Dartmouth, faithful friendship, and honorable dealings. In 1907, the Pukwana Club joined the national fraternity system after it received a charter to become the Delta Beta chapter of Sigma Nu. Sigma Nu's "Way of Honor" principle was similar to principles expressed in the Pukwana Club's original charter. The first residence for Sigma Nu at Dartmouth was purchased and refurbished in 1911. Known as the Green Castle, it served as chapter headquarters until the current house was built in 1925. In response to the national fraternity's segregationist membership policies, the fraternity went local in 1963, becoming Sigma Nu Delta. The national fraternity's bylaws were changed at the 1968 Grand Chapter, and in 1984 the fraternity reaffiliated with the national. In the summer of 2007, the Sigma Nu residence underwent significant structural renovations to bring the building up to the college's minimum standards and improve living facilities. Improvements included an enclosed fire escape running from the first floor to the third floor, a renovated kitchen and bathroom, new flooring, a new study room, and alterations to bedrooms. Prominent alumni include acting Solicitor General of the United States Neal Katyal '91, associate commissioner for the New York State Office for Temporary and Disability Assistance Jorge Montalvo, Actor David Birney, Television Sports Commentator Brett Haber, and Dungeons & Dragons designer and writer Mike Mearls.

=== Sigma Phi Epsilon ===
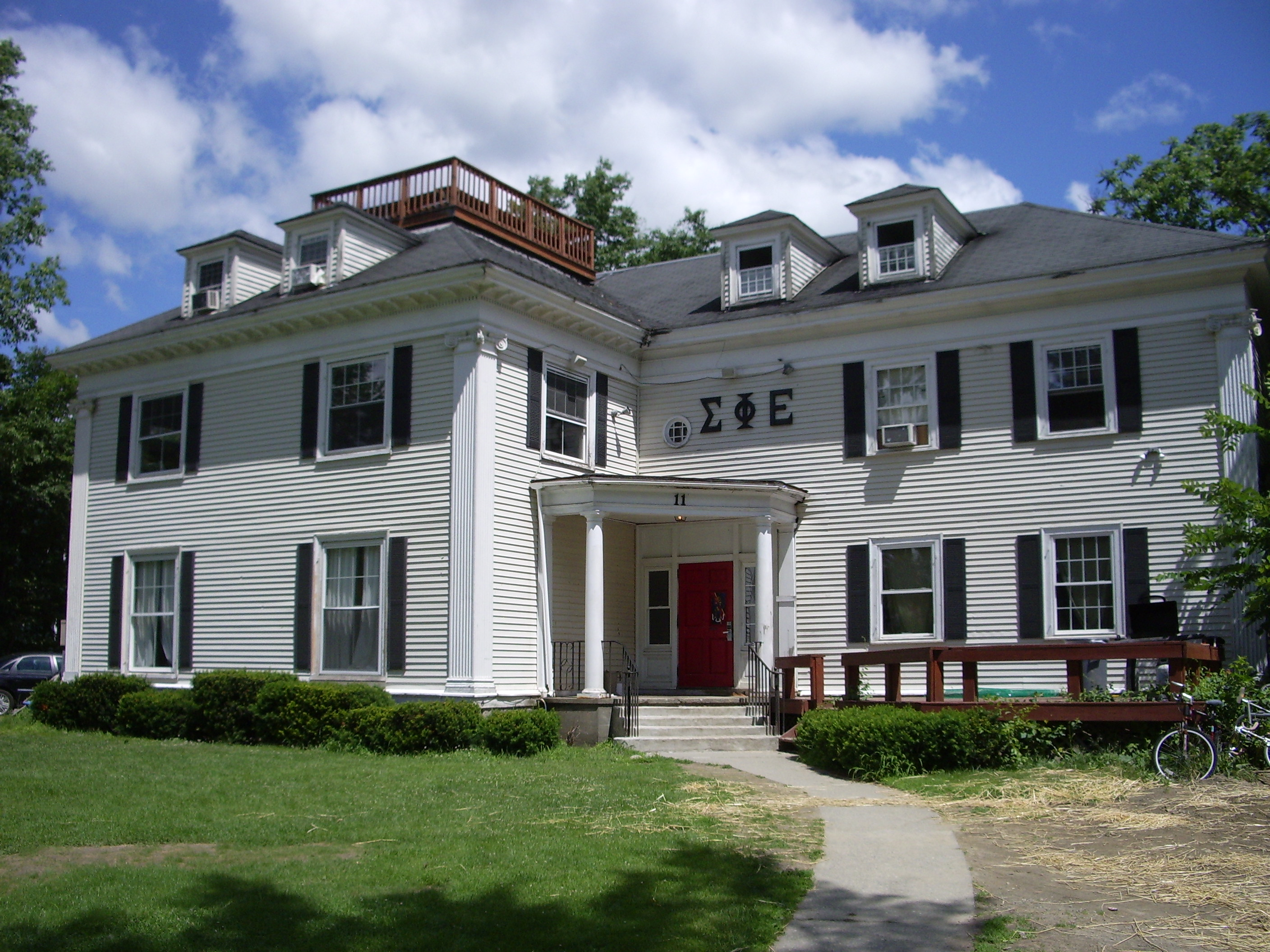
Sigma Phi Epsilon chapter house, 2007

Sigma Phi Epsilon (ΣΦΕ) at Dartmouth College was founded on April 22, 1908, as the local fraternity Omicron Pi Sigma. In 1909, the local fraternity became the New Hampshire Alpha chapter of Sigma Phi Epsilon. By the late 1960s, the house had become disenchanted with the national organization and felt that the Dartmouth membership would be better served as a local fraternity. The brothers voted to dissociate from the national organization on January 18, 1967. A vote of the alumni of the New Hampshire Alpha chapter on February 1, 1967, supported the decision. The new local fraternity adopted the name Sigma Theta Epsilon (which was also used by an unrelated national fraternity). The Sigma Phi Epsilon national continued to communicate with the local Sigma Theta Epsilon fraternity at Dartmouth, and by 1981, was willing to offer significant financial support for building renovations in exchange for reaffiliation. Convinced that the national organization had reformed its commitment to the individual chapters, the local fraternity voted to rejoin Sigma Phi Epsilon on February 18, 1981.

In 2010, Sig Ep decided to demolish its old house and build a brand new house at the same location, with its new house opening in 2011. After departure in 2018, Sig Ep returned to campus in 2022. Prominent alumni of the New Hampshire Alpha chapter include Theodor S. Geisel, Class of 1925, better known as "Dr. Seuss", James Forrestal, Class of 1915, who served as Secretary of War under President Franklin D. Roosevelt, former chairman of Dartmouth's board of trustees and CEO of Freddie Mac, Charles E. Haldeman, West Virginia Congressman Alex Mooney, singer Michael Odokara-Okigbo, and Stranger Things actor David Harbour.

=== Phi Delta Alpha ===
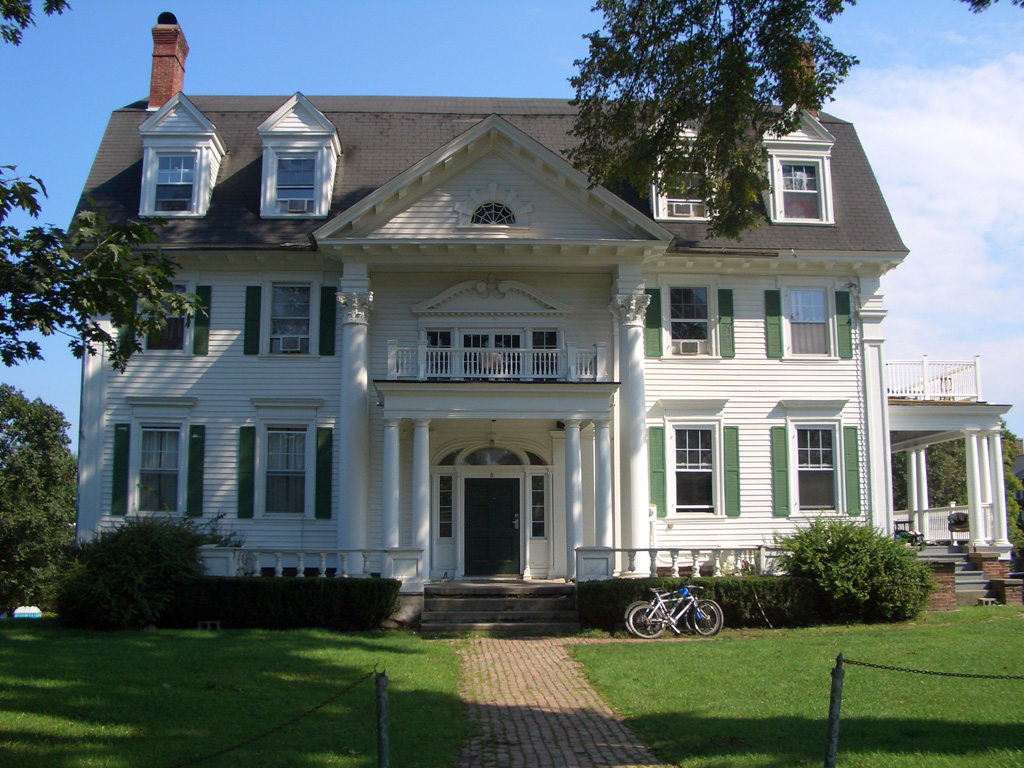
Phi Delta Alpha chapter house, 1986

Phi Delta Alpha (ΦΔΑ), commonly called Phi Delt or The Zig, was founded in 1884 as the New Hampshire Alpha chapter of Phi Delta Theta, a national fraternity. Early meetings of the fraternity were held in the Tontine Building on Main Street. The meeting location moved to the Currier Building in 1887 when the Tontine Building burned down. Phi Delta Theta began construction on a new house in 1898, and the building was completed in 1902, designed by Charles Alonzo Rich of Lamb & Rich, modeled after the Hancock Manor in Boston, Massachusetts. In January 1960, the Dartmouth chapter broke away from the national because the national would not allow minorities to pledge the house. The new, local fraternity replaced the last letter in its name with Alpha. In March 2000, the fraternity was derecognized by the college. One of the primary reasons for the punishment was that four members of Phi Delta Alpha started a fire in the Chi Gamma Epsilon basement next door. Under the leadership of Gig Faux, class of 1984, Phi Delta Alpha applied to the college for re-recognition in fall 2002. The first rush class was formed in the winter of 2003. Former General Electric Chief Executive Officer, Jeffrey Immelt (1978), is a former president of Phi Delta Alpha. Other influential alumni include longtime Dartmouth trustees R. Bradford Evans (1964) and William W. Helman IV (1980), former Dartmouth trustee Peter Fahey (1968), billionaire oilman Trevor Rees-Jones (1973), Game of Thrones television show writer and executive producer David Benioff (1991), Olympic gold medalist sprinter Gerry Ashworth, and Pulitzer winners Nigel Jaquiss (1984) and Joseph Rago (2005). In January 2010, a fire damaged the fraternity's physical plant. No one was harmed, but the house was closed for renovations until June 2010.

=== Chi Gamma Epsilon ===
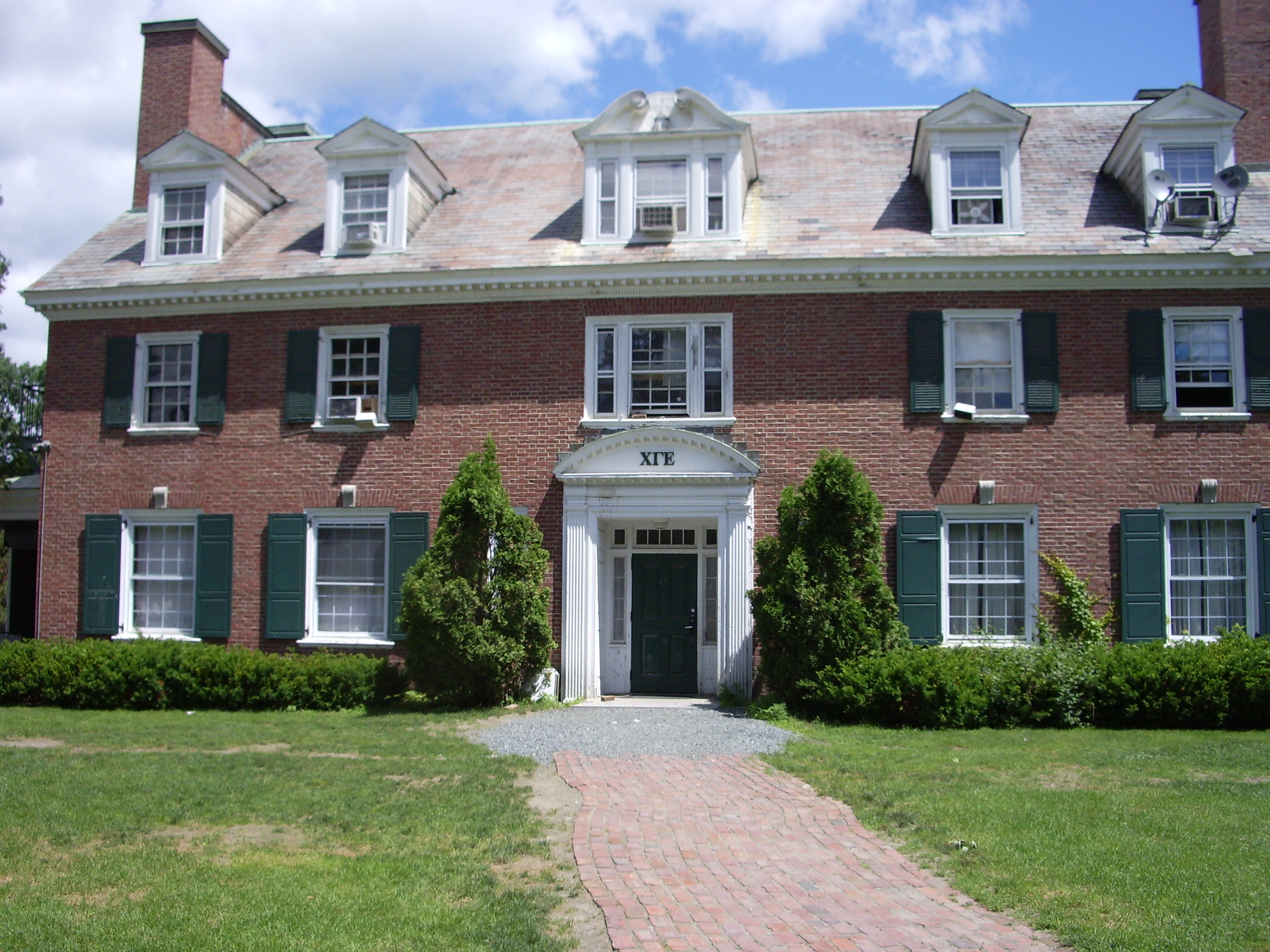
Chi Gamma Epsilon chapter house, 2007

Chi Gamma Epsilon (ΧΓΕ), commonly called by Chi Gam, was founded in 1905 as the Gamma Epsilon chapter of Kappa Sigma, a national fraternity. The Dartmouth chapter dissociated from the national fraternity in 1987. The disputes with the national organization were primarily over funding for repairs to the house. Initially, the new local fraternity adopted the name Kappa Sigma Gamma, but the national fraternity took offense to the similarities of the names. After a period simply being known by its address, 7 Webster, the fraternity came upon the name by which it is now known, and adopted the house motto "Come As You Are". Several Chi Gamma Epsilon/Kappa Sigma alumni brothers found fame in Major League Baseball careers, including all-star players Brad Ausmus (1991), and Mike Remlinger (1987), and former Baltimore Orioles General Manager Jim Beattie (1976). Other prominent brothers include Vivid Entertainment President William Asher (1984), and eBay Inc. CEO John Donahoe.

=== Chi Heorot ===
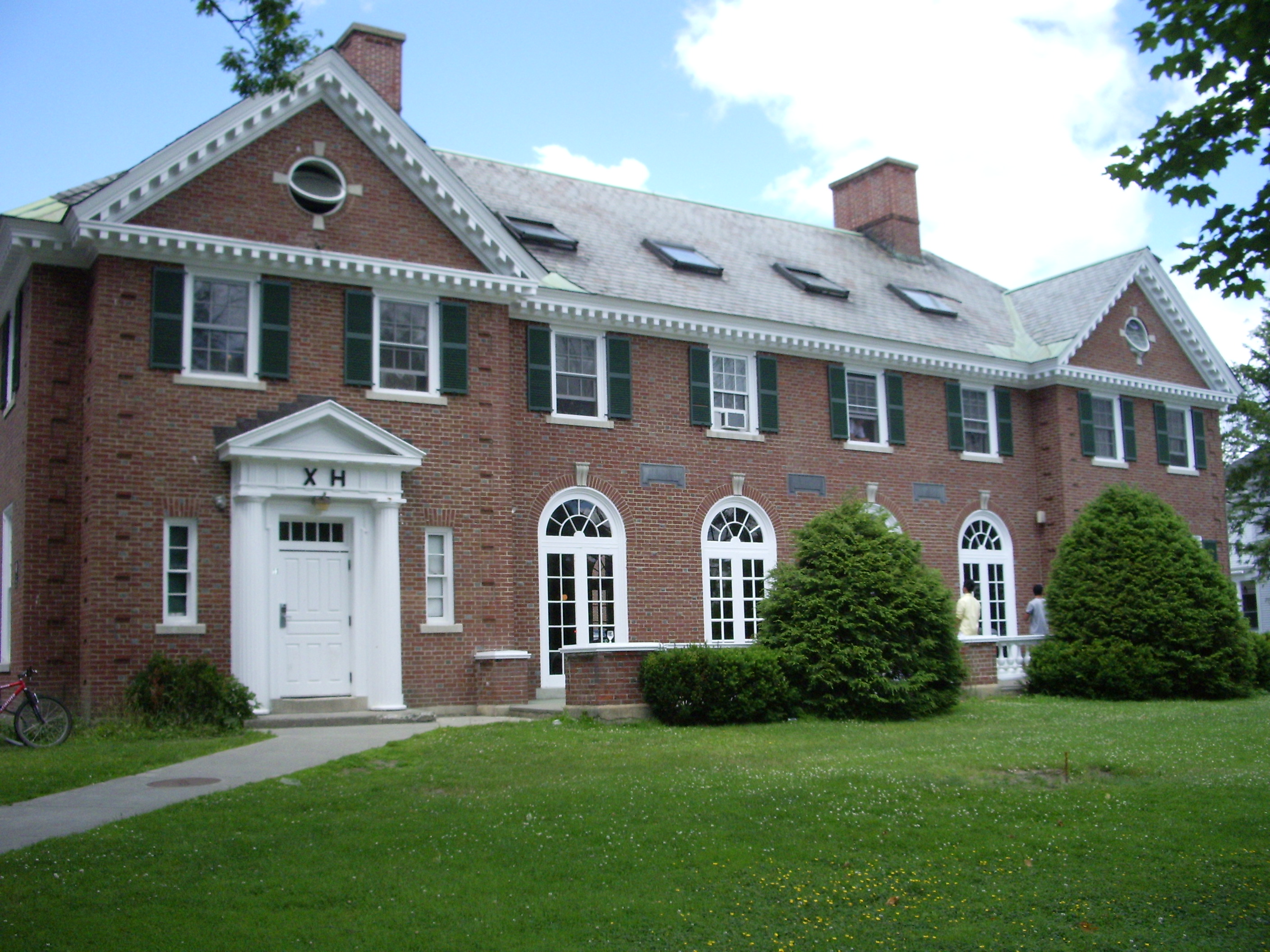
Chi Heorot chapter house, 2007

Chi Heorot (ΧH), commonly called Heorot or XH, was founded in 1897 as a local fraternity named Alpha Alpha Omega, and in 1902 was granted a charter as the Chi chapter of the Chi Phi fraternity. In 1903, the fraternity moved to its present location, and in 1927, it sold off its eighteenth-century house and built the house that stands today. In 1968, the house dissociated from the national fraternity, and adopted the name Chi Phi Heorot. The "Heorot" in Chi Phi Heorot comes from the medieval poem Beowulf, in which Heorot is the great hall where warriors converge to tell their stories. After several suspensions by the college in the early 1980s, it rejoined the Chi Phi national in 1981. This was short-lived; in 1987, because of damage done to the house that the college insisted upon having repaired for safety reasons, but the Chi Phi national refused to help finance, the Dartmouth brotherhood again opted to become a local fraternity. In exchange for financing renovations to the structure, the college assumed ownership of the property and house. In its second incarnation as a local fraternity, the brotherhood chose the name Chi Heorot. Notable alumni include Olympic medalists Gerry Geran (1918), Adam Nelson (1997), and Andrew Weibrecht (2009).

=== Psi Upsilon ===
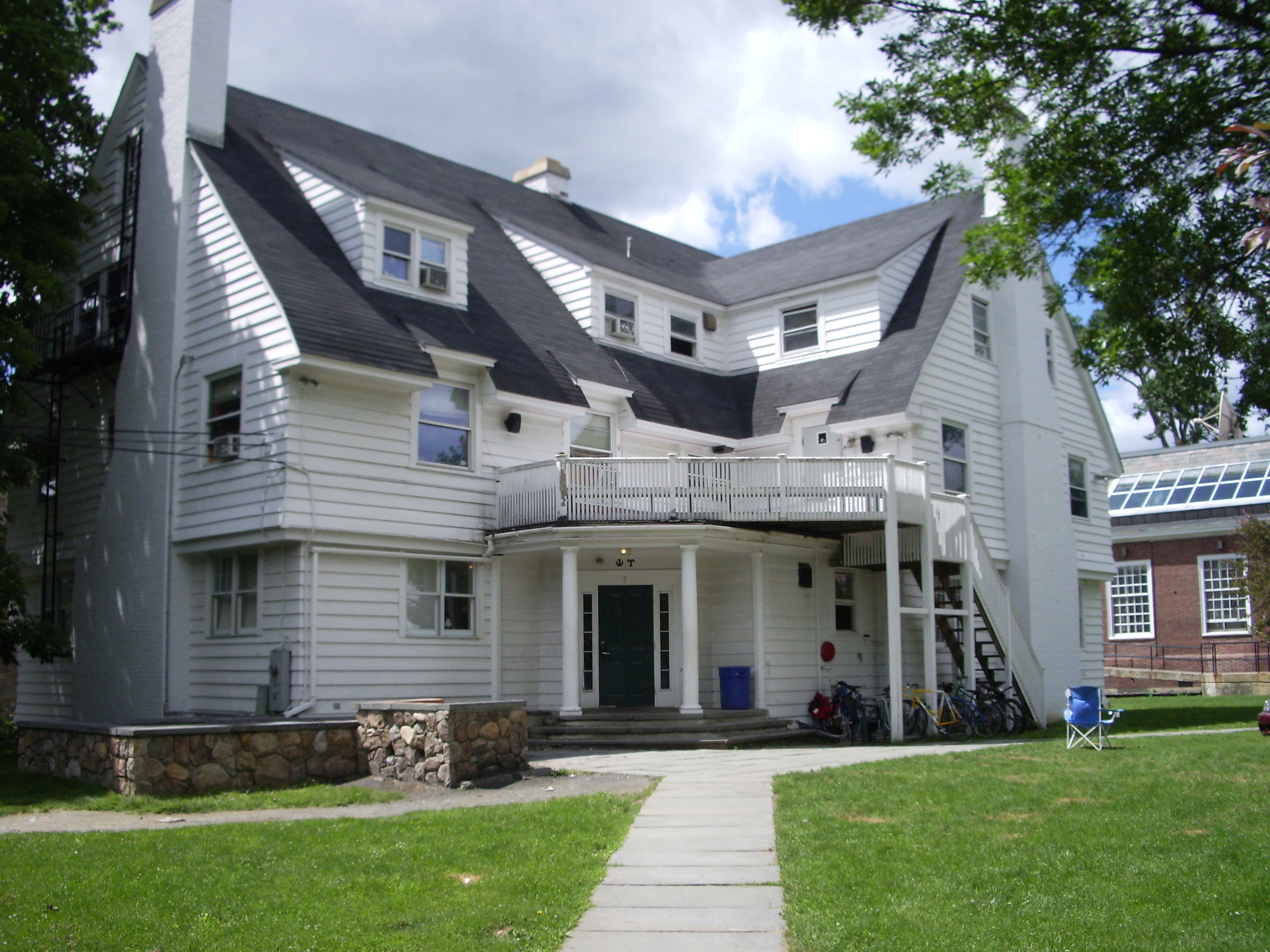
Psi Upsilon chapter house, 2007

The Zeta chapter of Psi Upsilon International Fraternity (ΨΥ), commonly called Psi U, was founded at Dartmouth in 1842, the first fraternity at Dartmouth College. In 1907, Psi Upsilon built the wood frame house it still occupies, designed by noted New Jersey theater architect and Dartmouth alumnus Fred Wesley Wentworth. Several additions during the latter half of the twentieth century greatly improved the structure, which houses around twenty brothers. The house most recently underwent substantial renovations during the spring of 2006. F. Scott Fitzgerald famously enjoyed the 1938 Winter Carnival in the Psi Upsilon chapter house. The Zeta chapter creates an ice pond in its yard every winter and is known as the "keg jumping fraternity" for its most popular Winter Carnival activity. Prominent alumni of the Zeta chapter of Psi Upsilon include banker, diplomat, and philanthropist Edward Tuck (1862), former United States Vice President Nelson Rockefeller (1930), and billionaire hedge fund manager of Lone Pine Capital, Steve Mandel (1978).

== Sororities ==
The single-sex female-only sororities at Dartmouth College are largely organized and represented by the college through the Inter-Sorority Council. The Inter-Sorority Council is a student-led governance organization that assists the member Greek organizations by promoting values, education, leadership, friendships, cooperation, and citizenship. Alpha Kappa Alpha and Delta Sigma Theta are not members of the Inter-Sorority Council but are members of the National Pan-Hellenic Council.

=== Alpha Kappa Alpha ===
Alpha Kappa Alpha (ΑΚΑ), commonly called AKA, at Dartmouth College was founded in 1983 as the Xi Lambda chapter of the national sorority. Alpha Kappa Alpha was the first historically African-American sorority at Dartmouth College. The college supported the sorority with dedicated apartment housing until it became defunct in the spring of 2003. The sorority had no members of the class of 2004 and was unable to recruit new members for subsequent classes because of a national moratorium on recruitment related to a hazing incident at another chapter. In February 2008, it was announced that Alpha Kappa Alpha would return to campus and resume activity in the spring or fall of 2008, and as of 2023, the chapter remains in operation.

=== Alpha Xi Delta ===
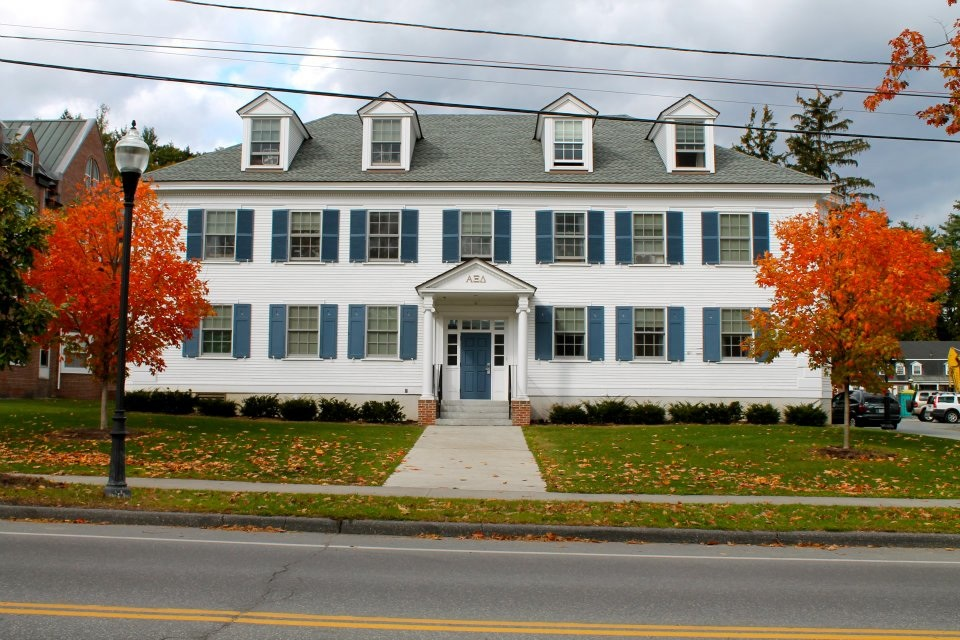
Alpha Xi Delta chapter house, 2011

The Theta Psi chapter of Alpha Xi Delta (ΑΞΔ), commonly called AXID, was founded as Delta Pi Omega in 1997. On January 6, 1997, the local sorority was officially recognized by the college, and on July 2, 1997, the sisters voted to affiliate with the Alpha Xi Delta national sorority. On February 21, 1998, the local organization's petition was approved by the national organization with a charter as the Theta Psi chapter. Alpha Xi Delta initially occupied the house currently home to Beta Theta Pi, until it was announced in 2008 that Beta was repossessing the house and that the sorority would have to relocate elsewhere. In the fall of 2009, they moved into a newly renovated house. Since the Theta Psi chapter's founding in 1997, Alpha Xi Delta has graduated multiple Rhodes Scholars. The Dartmouth chapter of Alpha Xi Delta sorority's national philanthropy is "Autism Speaks", although the chapter voted not to affiliate itself with the organization and is currently affiliated with COVID-19 relief efforts. They also volunteer for The Upper Valley Haven, a local group that provides shelter and education to families.

=== Alpha Phi ===
Alpha Phi (ΑΦ) was recognized on March 3, 2006, as the Dartmouth College colony of the international sorority. The colony officially became the Iota Kappa chapter of the sorority on April 28, 2007. Alpha Phi first participated in formal recruitment in September 2007. Dartmouth suspended the sorority in July 2024 after its members hosted an off-campus party that led to the death of Beta Alpha Omega member Won Jang. The sorority announced that they would be recruiting a new class in the fall of 2026, their first time back on campus since being suspended in 2024.

=== Delta Sigma Theta ===
Delta Sigma Theta (ΔΣΘ) is a historically African-American sorority at Dartmouth College that was founded in 1982 as the Che-Ase Interest Group. At the time, the college had imposed a moratorium on the founding of new sororities, but when the moratorium was lifted, the group was recognized by the college as a sorority in the fall of 1984. The women contacted the Delta Sigma Theta national sorority and were granted a charter as the Pi Theta chapter on April 28, 1985. Delta Sigma Theta provided an extensive array of public services through the Five-Point Thrust program. Until the chapter's dissolution, the sisters of Delta Sigma Theta had cosponsored the Step Show, an annual cultural dance performance, with the brothers of Alpha Phi Alpha. The sorority had occupied dedicated College-owned apartment housing until June 2004, when all but one member of the Dartmouth chapter graduated. An attempt was made to recruit new members in the summer, and it succeeded, as the chapter remains in operation as of 2022.

=== Kappa Delta ===
Kappa Delta (ΚΔ), commonly called KD, a national sorority, colonized its Eta Xi chapter on the Dartmouth campus in 2009. The Dartmouth Panhellenic Council approved the sorority on May 25, 2009. The Council considered the large pledge classes at other sororities on campus in deciding to authorize another sorority. The sorority recruited its first members in the summer of 2009, and Kappa Delta held its first formal rush during the fall 2009 academic term, offering membership bids to 37 women. Kappa Delta's new 23-bedroom house at 1 Occom Ridge was built over the 2013–2014 school year and was completed in the fall of 2014. It contains a formal room, a gourmet kitchen, a library, and two bedrooms on the first floor, along with 21 more single bedrooms on the second and third floors. The sisterhood of Kappa Delta is involved in numerous philanthropic endeavors, including working with the Girl Scouts of the USA, Prevent Child Abuse America, the New Hampshire Children's Trust, and the Confidence Coalition.

=== Kappa Delta Epsilon ===
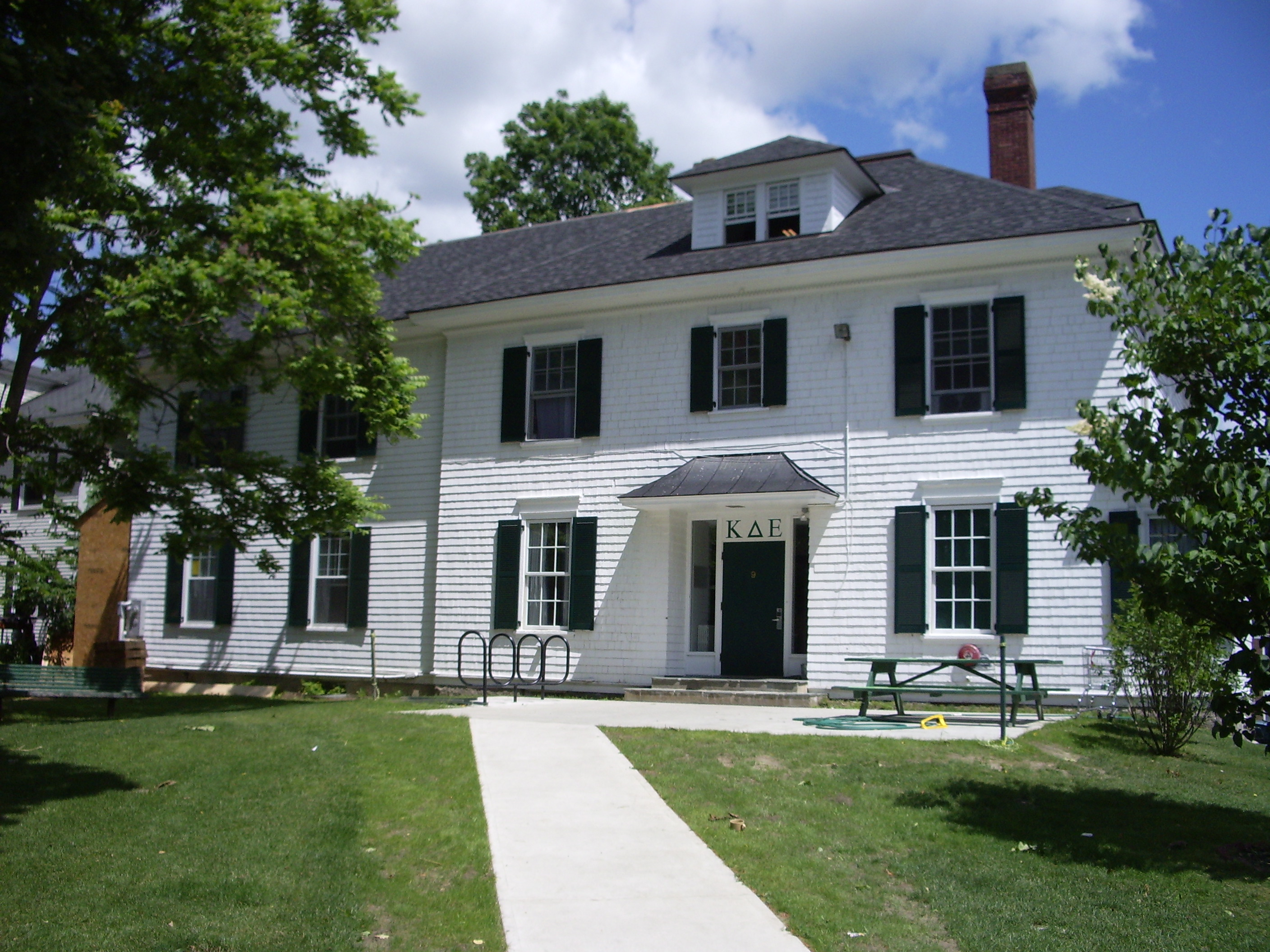
Kappa Delta Epsilon chapter house, 2007

Kappa Delta Epsilon (ΚΔΕ), commonly called KDE, is a local sorority founded in the fall of 1993 by the Panhellenic Council at Dartmouth. After the dissolution of the Xi Kappa Chi local sorority in the spring of 1993, the Panhellenic Council decided that there was a need for a new sorority to replace it. Fifty women joined the new sorority in the first rush in the fall of 1993. The Kappa Delta Epsilon physical plant was extensively remodeled by the college during the summer of 2003. The remodeled building contains a main meeting room, kitchen, two bedrooms, and a back porch on the first floor. The second and third floors contain all bedrooms that house about thirteen more resident sisters. The basement consists of the fireplace room, the pub room, and the sisters-only room.

=== Kappa Kappa Gamma ===
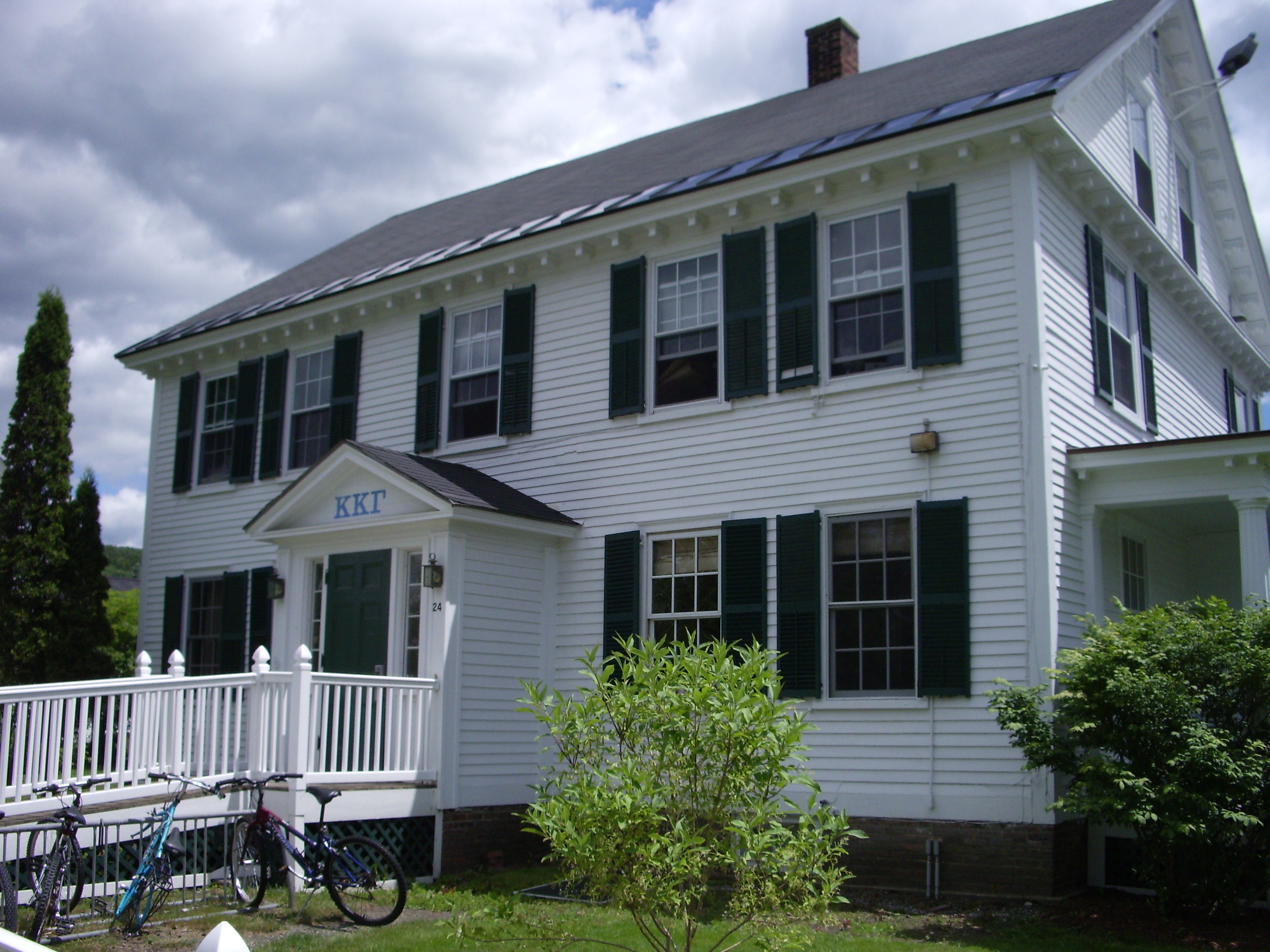
Kappa Kappa Gamma chapter house, 2007

The Epsilon Chi chapter of Kappa Kappa Gamma (ΚΚΓ), commonly called KKG and Kappa, was founded at Dartmouth on December 30, 1978, and was the second sorority founded at Dartmouth College. United States Senator Kirsten Gillibrand, a member of Dartmouth College's Class of 1988, was an officer of Kappa Kappa Gamma as an undergraduate.

=== Sigma Delta ===
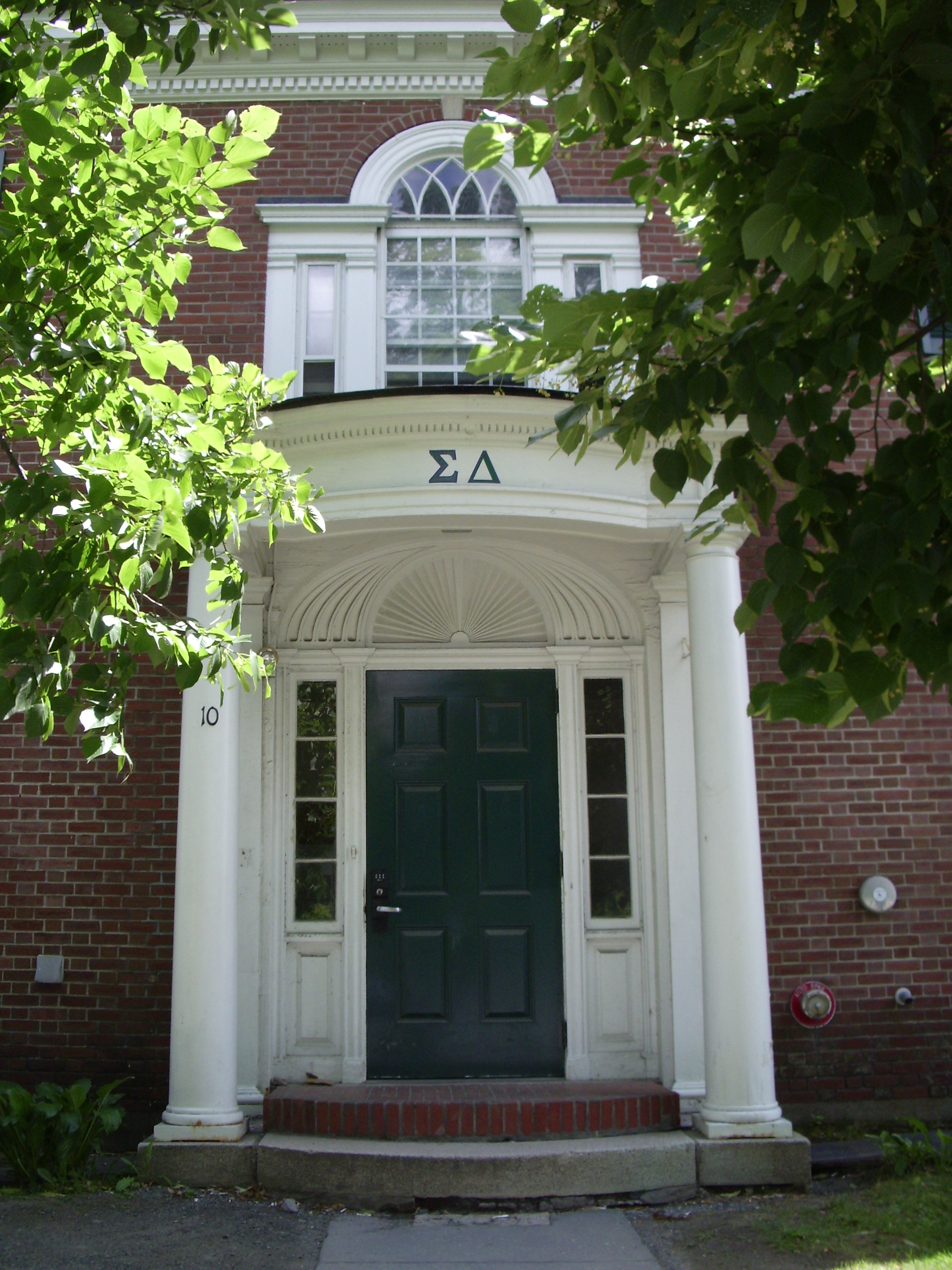
Sigma Delta chapter house, 2007

Sigma Delta (ΣΔ), commonly called Sigma Delta, was the first sorority at Dartmouth College, founded in May 1977 as the Zeta Lambda chapter of the national sorority Sigma Kappa. In April 1981, Sigma Kappa moved into a residence formerly inhabited by the Phi Gamma Delta fraternity. The local chapter at Dartmouth began to have differences with the national organization concerning religion in sorority rituals and an emphasis on men in national sorority songs. The Dartmouth chapter dissociated from the national organization in the fall of 1988, becoming Sigma Delta. The classes of 1989, 1990, and 1991 that formed the new local sorority dedicated the new organization to principles of "strength, friendship, and acceptance of difference". Since reorganizing as a local sorority, Sigma Delta has hosted at least one open party each term in addition to service events. Actress Connie Britton (1989) was a member of the first local class and served as Sisterhood Chair during her sophomore summer.

=== Sigma Lambda Gamma ===
Sigma Lambda Gamma (ΣΛΓ) was founded as an associate chapter at Dartmouth College on May 24, 2025. It is a multicultural sorority with predominately Latina members.

=== Chi Delta ===
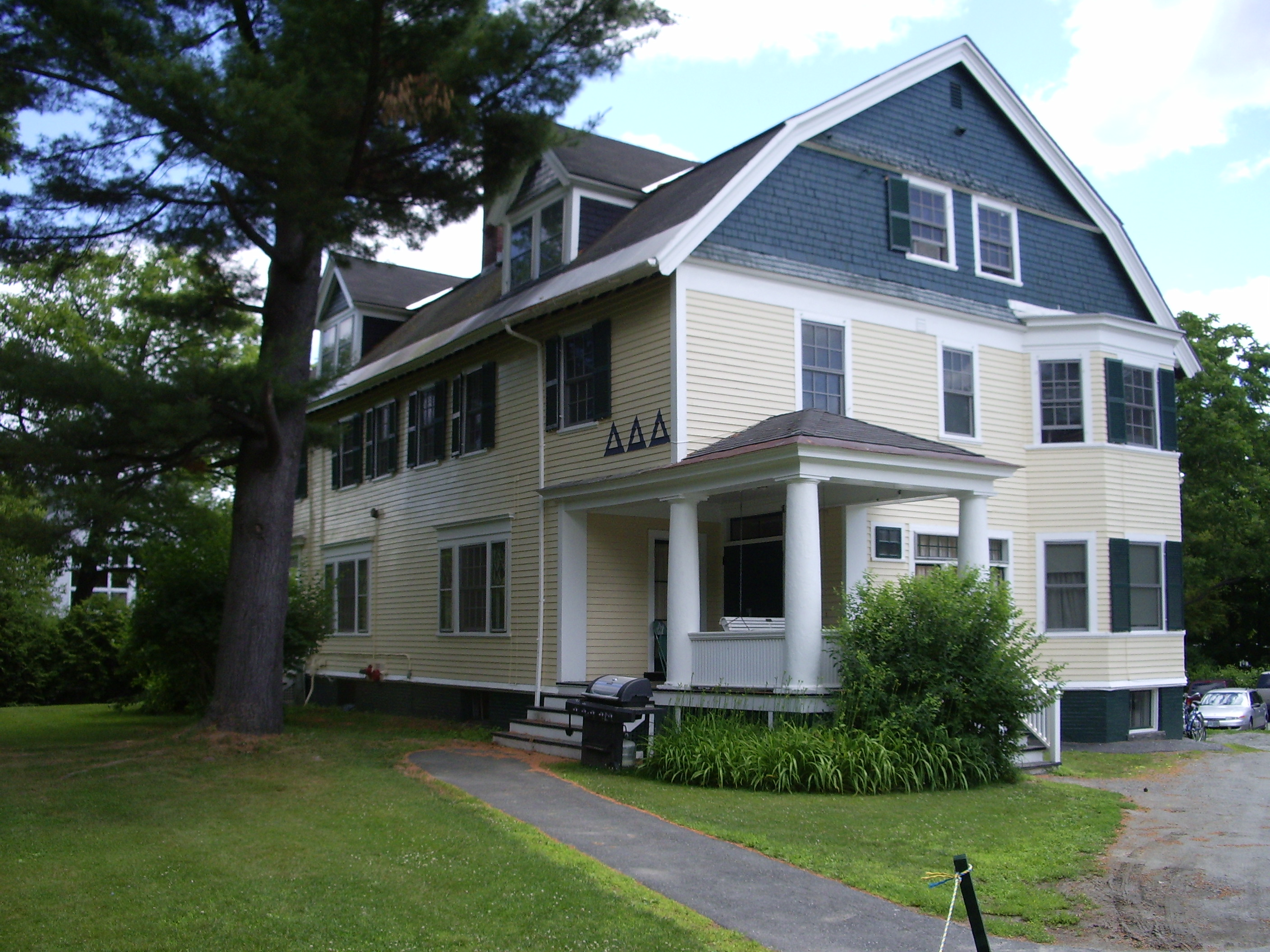
Chi Delta chapter house, 2007

Chi Delta (ΧΔ), commonly called Chi Delt, was founded at Dartmouth as the Gamma Gamma chapter of Delta Delta Delta sorority in 1984. The house was the first Greek organization to secede from the Co-ed Fraternity Sorority Council in the spring of 2000, a move that eventually precipitated the dissolution of that organizing body as other Greek organizations on campus followed suit. Chi Delta remains a member of the Panhellenic Council. On May 29, 2015, the Dartmouth chapter of Delta Delta Delta unanimously voted to disaffiliate from its national organization and become a local sorority.

== Gender-inclusive Greek houses ==
The four gender-inclusive Greek houses at Dartmouth College are organized and represented by the college through the Gender-Inclusive Greek Council. The Gender-Inclusive Greek Council is a student-led governance organization that oversees and supports its three chapters in their efforts to promote leadership, scholarship, and sibling-hood. All three gender-inclusive houses at Dartmouth own the land and residence buildings they occupy.

=== Alpha Theta ===
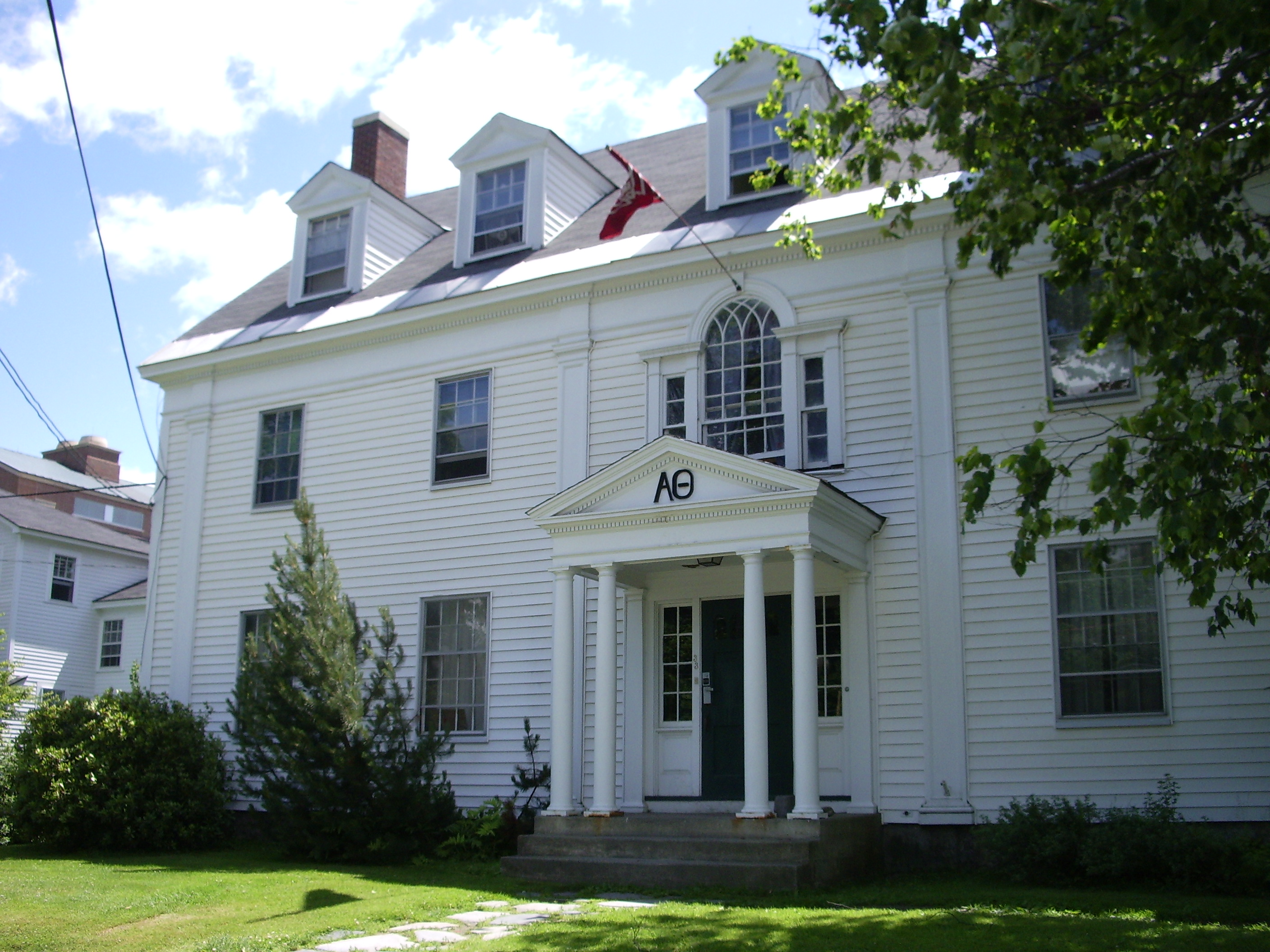
Alpha Theta chapter house, 2007

Alpha Theta (ΑΘ) was founded as a local fraternity named Iota Sigma Upsilon on March 3, 1920, by a group of seven students. In 1921, the fraternity received a charter as the Alpha Theta chapter of Theta Chi. John Sloan Dickey, later president of the college, joined the fraternity in 1928 and was elected house president two weeks later, while still a pledge. Nine brothers of Theta Chi died in a tragic accident on the morning of February 25, 1934, when the metal chimney of the building's old coal furnace blew out in the night and the residence filled with poisonous carbon monoxide gas.

Alpha Theta was one of the first collegiate fraternities in the United States to break from its national organization over civil rights issues. In 1951, while Dickey served as president of the college, the student body passed a resolution calling on all fraternities to eliminate racial discrimination from their constitutions. The Theta Chi national organization's constitution contained a clause limiting membership in the fraternity to "Caucasians" only. On April 24, 1952, the members of the Dartmouth chapter voted unanimously to stop recognizing the racial clause in Theta Chi's constitution. Upon learning that the Dartmouth delegation to Theta Chi's national convention later that year planned to raise questions about the clause, the Alpha Theta chapter was derecognized by the national organization on July 25, 1952.

The house was reincorporated as a local fraternity and adopted the name Alpha Theta. Alpha Theta was one of the first all-male fraternities to admit female members. In 1972, Dartmouth admitted the first class of female students and officially became a coeducational institution. Alpha Theta also voted to become coeducational. After a few years, most of the women in the fraternity had become inactive, and the house voted to become single-sex male-only again on November 10, 1976. The house returned to a gender-inclusive membership policy in 1980.

=== The Tabard ===
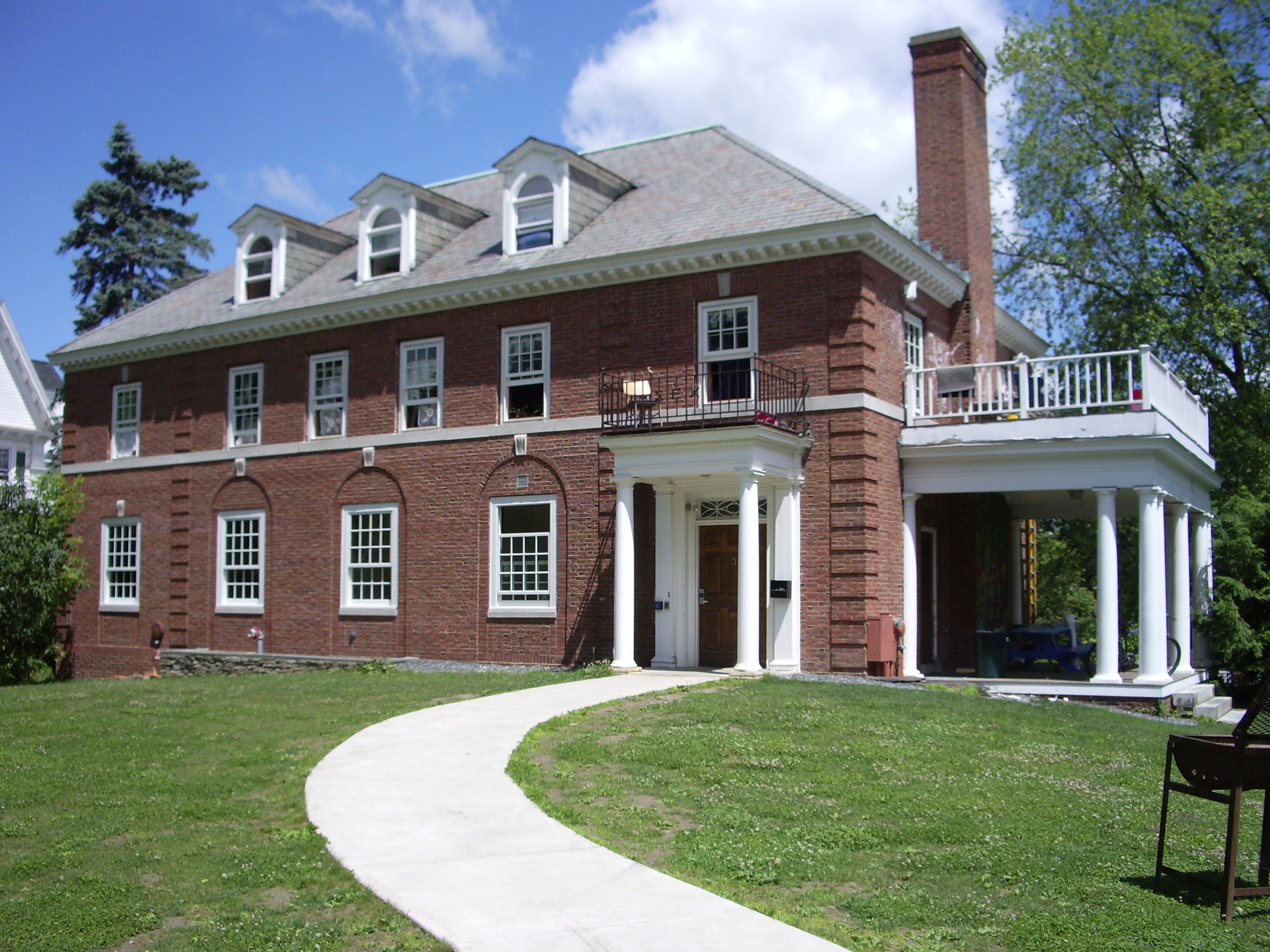
The Tabard chapter house, 2007

The Tabard (ΣΕΧ) at Dartmouth College was founded in 1857 as a local fraternity for students in the Chandler Scientific School named Phi Zeta Mu. As the Chandler School was absorbed by Dartmouth in 1893, the house decided to associate with a national fraternity and became the Eta Eta chapter of Sigma Chi national fraternity. In April 1960, the Dartmouth chapter of Sigma Chi became the third fraternity on campus to dissociate from its national organization, following the 1954 Undergraduate Council referendum requiring fraternities to amend their national charters to end discrimination against minorities or go "local".

The fraternity officially chose to use the name The Tabard, but also kept its Greek letters ΣΧ for its local corporation use to include all living and deceased members of both the chapter's national affiliation and the new local independent organization. The new name was inspired by The Tabard, a fictitious London inn described in the General Prologue of The Canterbury Tales by Geoffrey Chaucer. The Tabard was one of five Greek organizations at Dartmouth to become coeducational and admit women pledges when the college began admitting women students in 1972.

The organization unofficially uses the Greek letters Sigma Epsilon Chi (ΣΕΧ), having inserted an "E" between the Sigma and Chi on a wrought iron railing above the front door of their residence. Prominent alumni of the Tabard include: its first president Stephen W. Bosworth (1961) who was the U.S. Ambassador to South Korea, the Philippines, and Tunisia; Gordon Campbell (1970) who was the 34th Premier of British Columbia; and actress, comedian, and author Aisha Tyler (1992).

=== Phi Tau ===
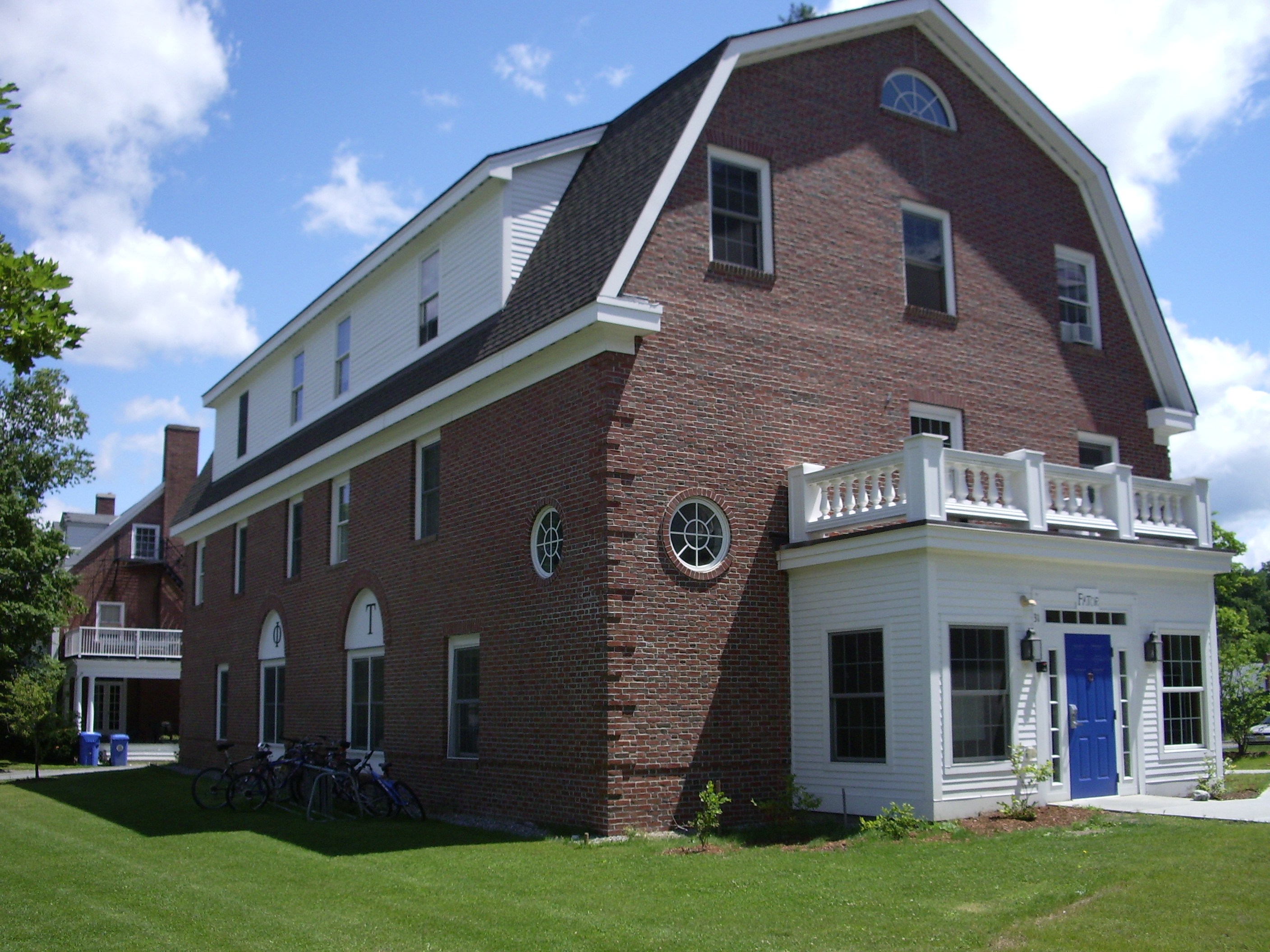
Phi Tau chapter house, 2007

Phi Tau (ΦΤ) was founded at Dartmouth College in 1905 as the Tau chapter of Phi Sigma Kappa. While the national fraternity proved to be an early leader among its peers by adopting non-discrimination policies in the mid-1950s Tau chapter leaders led the demand for such post-war era changes. The pace of change was contentious: Phi Sigma Kappa had previously had occasional foreign student members at many chapters. Unlike other fraternities, it also welcomed Catholics and Jews at a time when most fraternity members were Protestant. But aside from occasional foreign students, it did not admit Black members. In a reactionary response to a short-lived policy that limited the pledging of Black students between 1952 and 1956, and in a move that allowed it to avoid unpaid debts to the national fraternity, Tau broke with Phi Sigma Kappa and reformed itself as Phi Tau on March 7, 1956, naming the national fraternity as racist. Ironically, the Dartmouth chapter won the debate over the issue: the same discriminatory policy that caused Tau to withdraw was itself rescinded by the national fraternity at its Summer Convention just two months later, leaving Phi Sigma Kappa chapters free to pledge Black members. There has been no reconciliation, even though both groups remain progressive. Today, Phi Tau prides itself on its progressiveness; when the house constitution was rewritten in 1956, references to gender were deliberately excluded, making the house officially coeducational even before Dartmouth College accepted women as students. Phi Tau is the only coeducational Greek organization at Dartmouth that has always had female members since first admitting them, and was the first Greek house at Dartmouth to add sexual orientation to its non-discrimination clause. Members of Phi Tau refer to one another as "siblings" regardless of gender. The house is known for its quarterly "Milque and Cookies" party, featuring thousands of homemade cookies and milkshakes. Phi Tau completely replaced their residence hall in 2002, for $1.8 million, funded in part by the sale of 1,675 square metres (0.4 acres) of land to the college.

=== Epsilon Kappa Theta ===
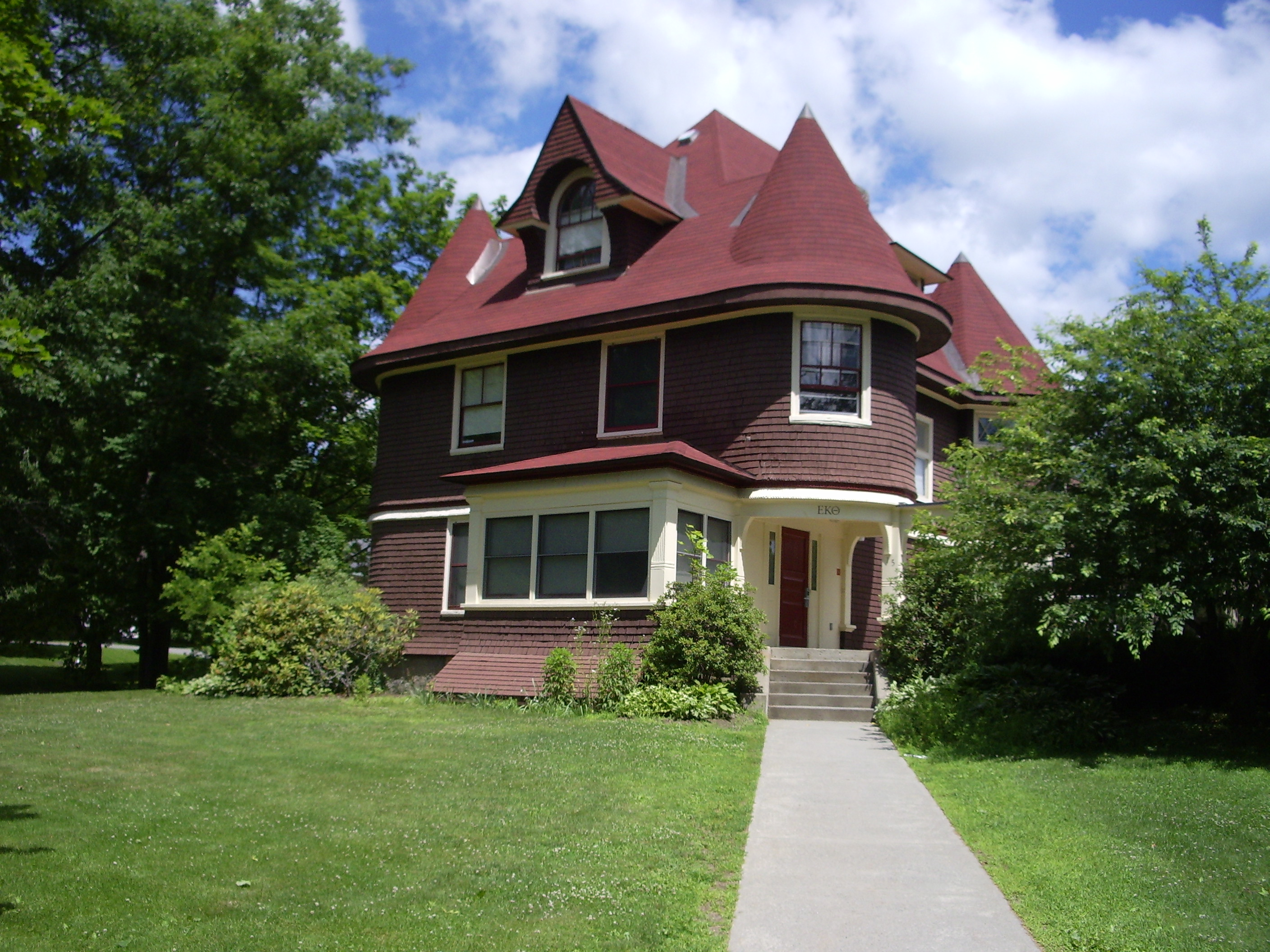
Epsilon Kappa Theta chapter house, 2007

Epsilon Kappa Theta (ΕΚΘ), commonly called EKT and Theta, at Dartmouth College was founded in January 1982 as the Epsilon Kappa colony of the Kappa Alpha Theta national sorority. Epsilon Kappa was the 100th colony of the sorority. The sorority initially met in various locations, including the basement of the college president's house. In 1984, the sorority moved into Brewster Hall, a college-owned house previously used as an International House and, later, as temporary housing for the Alpha Chi Omega sorority. In 1992, the sisters of the Epsilon Kappa chapter of Kappa Alpha Theta found the strict national rules and the primarily Christian religious readings and rituals of the organization to be antithetical to the spirit of feminism and inclusivity that the chapter desired. The national organization was unhappy that the colony disobeyed its rules and failed to follow the sorority's rituals. On May 4, 1992, the Epsilon Kappa notified the Kappa Alpha Theta national organization of its unanimous vote to disaffiliate and become a local sorority. The national organization revoked the charter of Epsilon Kappa. The Dartmouth women chose the new name Epsilon Kappa Theta. Its current residence is a Victorian house that was the Delta Psi Delta chapter house until 1991. Epsilon Kappa Theta calls itself "one of the most diverse and progressive" Greek houses on campus, and welcomes queer, non-binary, and gender non-conforming members. It voted to leave the Inter-Sorority Council in April 2024 to be more accommodating to its members of marginalized genders. It has since joined the Gender-Inclusive Greek Council as its fourth member organization.

== Defunct Greek organizations ==
Greek organizations at Dartmouth College that dissolved over the years have largely done so over financial difficulties or low membership and interest.

=== Acacia ===
The Zayin chapter of Acacia, a national fraternity, was founded at Dartmouth on March 31, 1906. The Acacia national organization never heard from the Dartmouth chapter again and lacks records of any student members or activities the chapter might have pursued. The national organization declared the chapter dissolved in 1908. Acacia was the first fraternity at Dartmouth to dissolve, and the Zayin chapter was the first Acacia chapter at any campus to close.

=== Alpha Delta ===
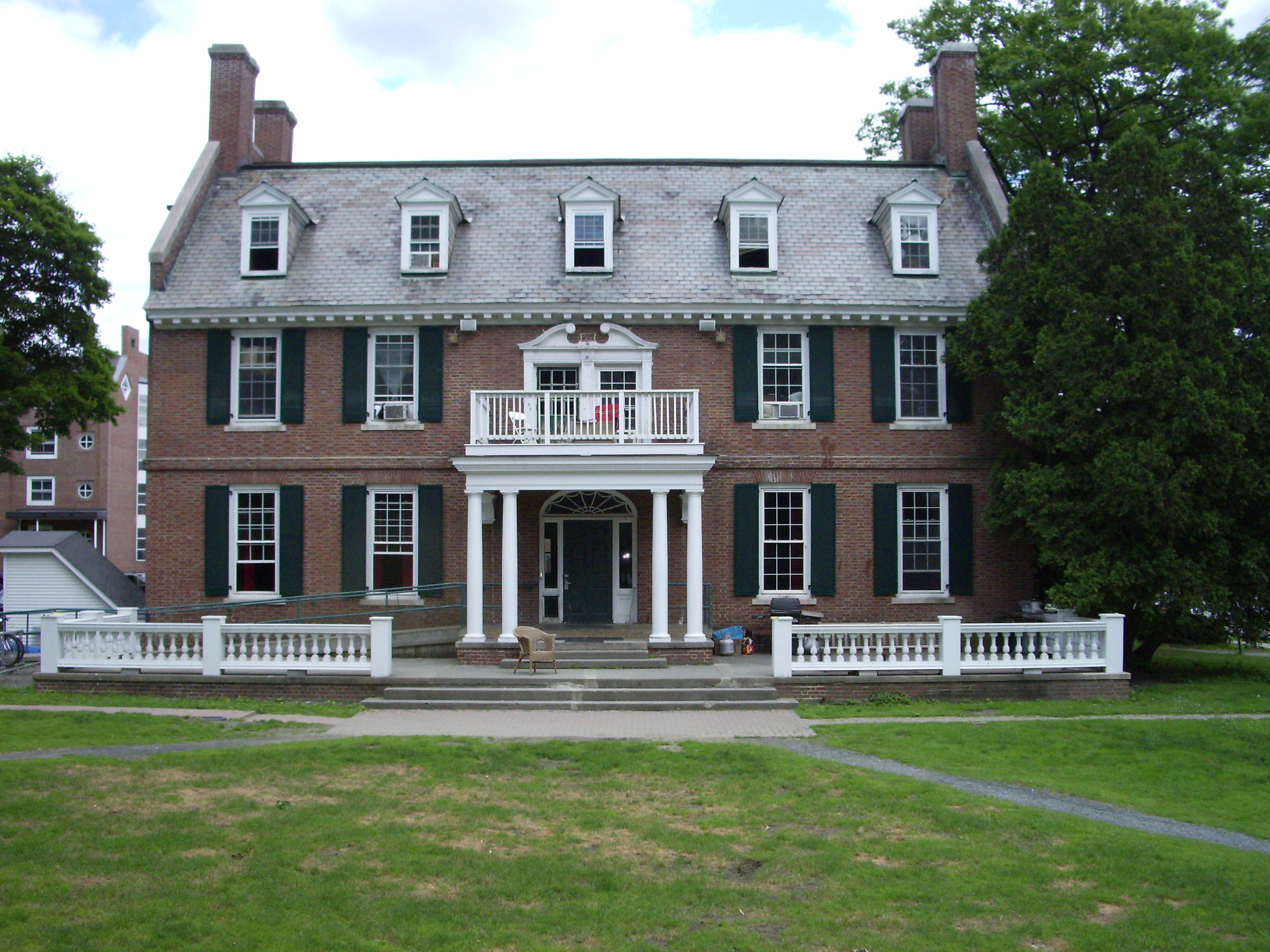
Alpha Delta chapter house, 2007

Alpha Delta (ΑΔ), commonly called AD, was initially founded by members of the Gamma Sigma Society. In 1847, the society became the Dartmouth chapter of Alpha Delta Phi, a national fraternity. The house dissociated from its parent corporation in 1969 and renamed itself The Alpha Delta Fraternity. Alpha Delta is well known for being part of the inspiration behind the movie National Lampoon's Animal House. The screenplay, co-written by Chris Miller, class of 1963, was inspired by a pair of short stories Miller wrote in National Lampoon in 1974 and 1975 ("The Night of the Seven Fires" and "Pinto's First Lay") about his experiences as a member of Alpha Delta. In November 2006, Miller published a memoir of his experiences in the fraternity under the title The Real Animal House: The Awesomely Depraved Saga of the Fraternity That Inspired the Movie. Alpha Delta was derecognized by Dartmouth College on April 13, 2015. In 2025, after a decade without students living in the building, the Alpha Delta Alumni Corporation appealed to the Hanover zoning board to once again convert the facility to student housing.

=== Alpha Pi Omega ===
Alpha Pi Omega (ΑΠΩ) was established by women at Dartmouth College in May 2001. The organization was chartered as the Epsilon chapter of the national historically Native American sorority in 2006 and was officially recognized by the college as a full chapter beginning with the fall 2006 academic term. The sorority had college-owned housing on campus. Alpha Pi Omega had a six-week-long pledge period known as the Honey Process. For college governance purposes, the Epsilon chapter associated locally with the local member societies of the National Association of Latino Fraternal Organizations, but as of 2022, the chapter was no longer operating.

=== Alpha Sigma Phi ===
Alpha Sigma Phi (ΑΣΦ) at Dartmouth College was founded in 1925, as a local fraternity named Sigma Alpha, The local fraternity became the Alpha Eta chapter of Alpha Sigma Phi, a national fraternity, in 1928. Faced with financial difficulties during the Great Depression, the Dartmouth chapter dissolved in 1936. C. Everett Koop (1937) who was Surgeon General of the United States from 1982 to 1989, was a member of one of the final Alpha Sigma Phi pledge classes at Dartmouth.

=== Alpha Tau Omega ===
Alpha Tau Omega (ΑΤΩ) was founded at Dartmouth College in 1915 as the local fraternity Sigma Tau Omega. In 1924, the local fraternity was granted a charter to become the Delta Sigma chapter of the national fraternity Alpha Tau Omega. The Dartmouth chapter dissolved in 1936, at the height of the Great Depression.

=== Beta Theta Pi ===
Beta Theta Pi (ΒΘΠ) established a chapter at Dartmouth, now dormant, which lasted for over 100 years. The group that had its origins in a fraternity at Dartmouth's Chandler Scientific School named Sigma Delta Pi, a small national fraternity formed in 1858. (Note: Not to be confused with the national Spanish language fraternity, formed at Berkeley in 1919.) This was the second Chandler fraternity and the seventh fraternity founded at the college. Sigma Delta Pi changed its name to Vitruvian (a tribute to the Roman architect Vitruvius) in 1871 and under that name established two short-lived chapters at other schools. In 1889, the Dartmouth chapter decided to join a national fraternity, and the organization soon became the Alpha Omega chapter of Beta Theta Pi. It built a house (now South Fairbanks Hall) designed by Beta graduate Charles A. Rich of Lamb & Rich in 1904, and it built its second house on Webster Avenue in 1933.

Notable Dartmouth alumni of Beta Theta Pi include but are not limited to: former US Representative from New Hampshire Frank G. Clarke, author Norman Maclean, former Governor of New Hampshire Walter R. Peterson (1947), businessman Alan Reich (1952), former Dartmouth President David T. McLaughlin (1954), owner of the Cincinnati Bengals Mike Brown (1957), founder of the Big East Conference Dave Gavitt (1959), former Athletic Director of Syracuse University Jake Crouthamel (1960), member of College Football Hall of Fame and Chief Executive Officer of the Hanover Company Murry Bowden (1971), professional poker player Chip Reese (1973), Politician Joel Hyatt (1972), US Congressman John Carney (1978), college football coach Buddy Teevens (1978), former NFL football coach Dave Shula (1981), former NFL quarterback Jeff Kemp (1981), Olympic skier Tiger Shaw (1985), former NFL quarterback Jay Fiedler (1994), and actor Brian J. White (1996).

Beta Theta Pi was suspended by the college three times in the 1990s. An incident of hazing in 1994 led to a year-long period of derecognition. In the summer of 1995, a member of Beta Theta Pi read a poem aloud during a house meeting that was deemed to be racist and sexist, and resulted in many calling for derecognition of the fraternity. In 1996, a Coed Fraternity Sorority Council judiciary committee found Beta Theta Pi guilty of six violations of college and fraternity policies. The college derecognized Beta Theta Pi permanently on December 6, 1996. The Hanover Police Department reported that the outgoing brothers of Beta Theta Pi did an estimated $15,000 in damage to the property soon after hearing of the permanent derecognition decision.

=== Delta Kappa Epsilon ===
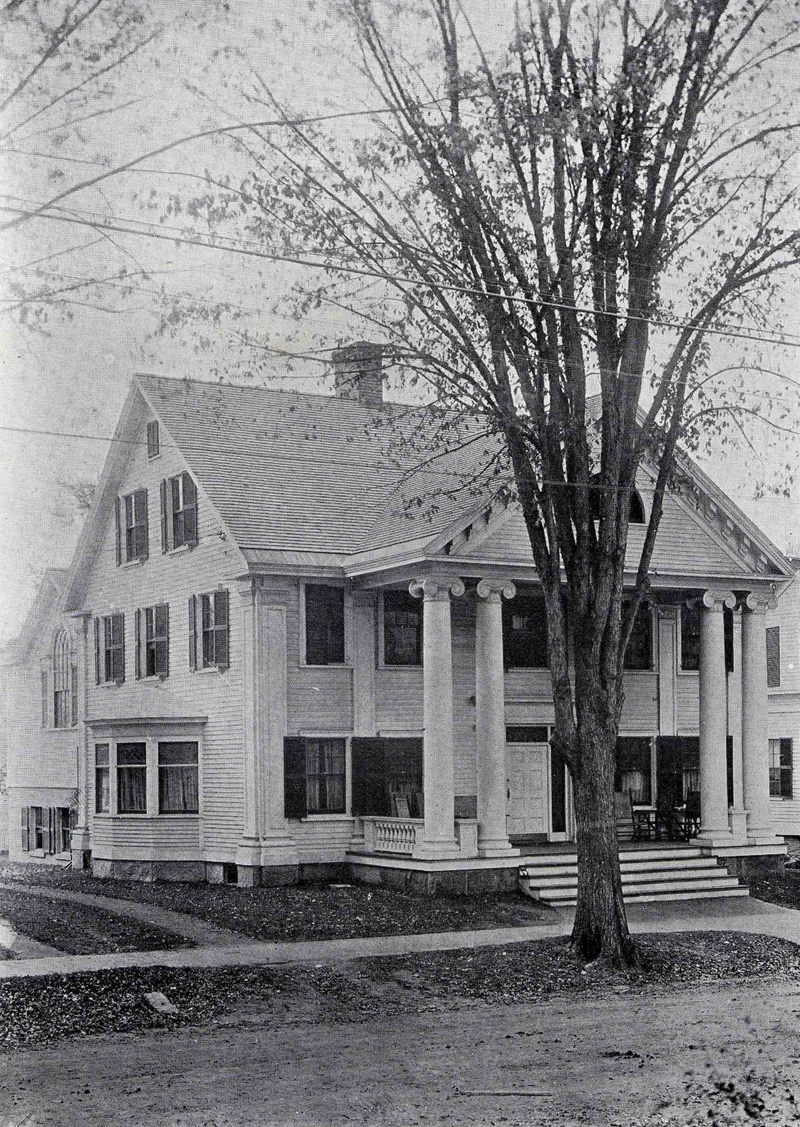
Delta Kappa Epsilon chapter house, circa 1915

The Pi chapter of Delta Kappa Epsilon (ΔΚΕ), commonly called Deke, was founded in 1853. It was the fourth social fraternity at Dartmouth College. Eight brothers of Delta Kappa Epsilon were famously involved then the 1949 murder of a fellow Dartmouth student. The men, after heavy drinking at three different fraternities, sought out a former member of the freshman football team. Finding him asleep in his dormitory room, but wearing a letter sweater that the eight men felt he did not deserve to be wearing, they beat him, and he soon thereafter died of the injuries. Two Delta Kappa Epsilon brothers were brought to trial, fined, and given suspended sentence for the crime. In response to the murder, College President John Sloan Dickey announced that he felt it was important to reduce the influence of the fraternity system on campus. The organization was renamed Storrs House in 1970 before dissolving entirely.

=== Delta Upsilon ===
Delta Upsilon (ΔΥ) at Dartmouth College was founded as Epsilon Kappa Phi, a local fraternity, at Dartmouth College in 1920. In 1926, the local fraternity became the Dartmouth chapter of Delta Upsilon, a national fraternity. The fraternity dissociated from the national organization in 1966 and adopted the name, Foley House. Foley House was one of the six local Greek organizations that became coeducational in 1972. In 1984, the organization decided to drop its association with the Greek system entirely and became one of the Affinity Housing programs offered by the college, available to any student interested in cooperative housing.

=== Delta Phi Epsilon ===
Delta Phi Epsilon (ΔΦΕ) was founded at Dartmouth College in 1984 as the Epsilon Alpha chapter of the national sorority. The sorority was derecognized by the college in June 1989, when it failed to maintain an active membership of at least 35 students. The Dartmouth chapter attempted to revive itself by separating from the national sorority in 1990 to become Pi Sigma Psi, a local sorority, but dissolved soon thereafter.

=== Delta Psi Delta ===
Delta Psi Delta (ΔΨΔ) was established at Dartmouth College in 1950 as the Epsilon Delta chapter of Tau Epsilon Phi, a national fraternity. The Dartmouth chapter dissociated from the national in 1969 and reformed itself as the Harold Parmington Foundation. Faced with falling membership in 1981, the fraternity reformed itself with a more traditional Greek letter name, Delta Psi Delta. In 1987, Delta Psi Delta opened its membership to women and men. Four years later, faced with critically low enrollment, Delta Psi Delta finally dissolved in 1991. The local, coeducational fraternity at Dartmouth was not associated with either the Canadian sorority or the local fraternities at California State University, Chico and Linfield College also named Delta Psi Delta.

=== Zeta Beta Chi ===
Zeta Beta Chi (ΖΒΧ) was founded in 1984 as a local sorority named Alpha Beta. In 1986, the sorority gained a charter as the Zeta Beta chapter of Delta Gamma, a national sorority. In 1997, the sorority voted to go local again and reformed as Zeta Beta Chi. Plagued with low membership, the sorority was already on a marginal financial footing in 1998 when a college inspection during the summer discovered mercury contamination in the sorority's basement, the former house of Arthur Sherburne Hardy. The college closed the building for the remainder of the year, negatively impacting the fall rush. The sorority announced its dissolution in December 1998.

=== Harold Parmington Foundation ===
The Harold Parmington Foundation, or HPF, was a local fraternity founded in 1970 after the Epsilon Delta chapter of Tau Epsilon Phi dissociated from its national organization. The new local fraternity continued to reside at 15 Webster Avenue, the house now occupied by the Epsilon Kappa Theta sorority. With only one member each from the classes of 1983 and 1984, the fraternity reorganized itself as a coeducational fraternity named Delta Psi Delta. A past president of the fraternity, Brian Dale (1980), was one of the passengers on American Airlines Flight 11 that was hijacked and flown into the North Tower of the World Trade Center in New York City during the September 11, 2001 attacks.

=== Kappa Alpha Psi ===
Kappa Alpha Psi (ΚΑΨ) at Dartmouth College was founded in 1987 as the Mu Chi chapter of the national fraternity. Kappa Alpha Psi was the second historically African-American fraternity at Dartmouth College. Its membership was active through at least the end of the 1990s. The Kappa Alpha Psi national currently lists the Mu Chi chapter as inactive.

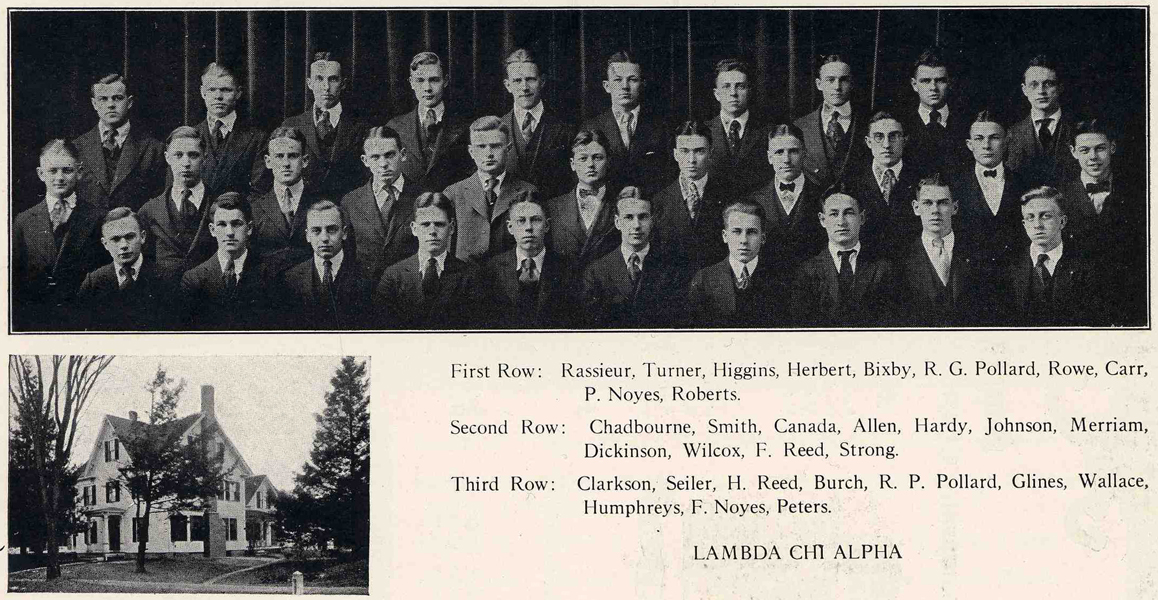
The brotherhood and chapter house of Lambda Chi Alpha in the 1922 Dartmouth College yearbook, The Aegis

=== Lambda Chi Alpha ===
Lambda Chi Alpha (ΛΧΑ) was founded at Dartmouth College in 1914 as the Theta Zeta chapter of the national fraternity. Faced with insurmountable financial stress during the Great Depression, the Dartmouth chapter dissolved in 1932.

=== Lambda Upsilon Lambda ===
Lambda Upsilon Lambda (ΛΥΛ), known more formally as La Unidad Latina, Lambda Upsilon Lambda Fraternity, Inc., was established at Dartmouth in 1997. The Psi chapter of Lambda Upsilon Lambda was the college's first historically Latino fraternity. The fraternity had no physical plant. Lambda Upsilon Lambda sponsored Noche Dorada, an annual semi-formal dinner that features a guest speaker invited to the campus to address issues of Latino culture. The fraternity also supported the Brazil Project, in conjunction with its Sigma chapter at Wesleyan University, which supported thirteen families in Brazil. As of 2022, the chapter is currently inactive at the undergraduate level.

=== Xi Kappa Chi ===
Xi Kappa Chi (ΞΚΧ) was originally established at Dartmouth in 1980 as the Zeta Mu chapter of Alpha Chi Omega, a national sorority. The sorority dissociated from the national organization in 1990 and became a local sorority named Xi Kappa Chi. Faced with low membership in 1993, the local sorority considered an affiliation with Phi Mu, a national sorority, as a possibility of attracting more new members hesitant to rush a small local sorority. The Phi Mu national organization sent representatives to Dartmouth in April 1993, but based on their report, the Phi Mu national council voted against a Dartmouth chapter. Xi Kappa Chi was dissolved by the Dartmouth Panhellenic Council in 1993.

=== Pi Lambda Phi ===
The Pi chapter of the national fraternity Pi Lambda Phi (ΠΛΦ) was established at Dartmouth College in 1924. The membership of the Dartmouth chapter was predominantly Jewish. About half of the college's fraternities at the time had national constitutions that explicitly forbade membership to Jews, and for many of the other chapters, it was an informal policy to exclude membership to Jewish students. The national constitution of Pi Lambda Phi expressly accepted members of all religions. Pi Lambda Phi was not initially accepted by the Dartmouth Greek community, and efforts in 1924 and 1925 to gain formal admission into the Interfraternity Council failed. The fraternity was finally recognized in the spring of 1927. The fraternity's first residence, purchased in 1924, was a building on South Street originally occupied by a Roman Catholic church. The fraternity would reside there until 1961, when it moved to a house north of Webster Avenue on Occom Ridge. The chapter dissolved in 1971.

=== Sigma Alpha Mu ===
Sigma Alpha Mu (ΣΑΜ) was established at Dartmouth College in 1930 as the Sigma Upsilon chapter of the national fraternity. At the time, the Sigma Alpha Mu national limited membership in the organization to Jewish men. Sigma Alpha Mu placed more emphasis on the observances of Judaism than did the other predominantly Jewish fraternity on campus, Pi Lambda Phi, and had difficulty attracting the interest of most mainstream Jewish students on campus. The Dartmouth chapter dissolved in 1935, during the Great Depression.

=== Sigma Lambda Upsilon ===
Sigma Lambda Upsilon (ΣΛΥ), more formally known as Sigma Lambda Upsilon/Señoritas Latinas Unidas Sorority, Inc., was established by four women at Dartmouth College in 2003, as the Alpha Beta chapter of the national, historically-Latina sorority. The sorority had no physical plant or designated College-owned housing. The Dartmouth chapter supported several activities, including philanthropic events, formal dinners, and a summer book club, but as of 2022, the chapter was no longer operating on campus.

=== Tau Epsilon Phi ===
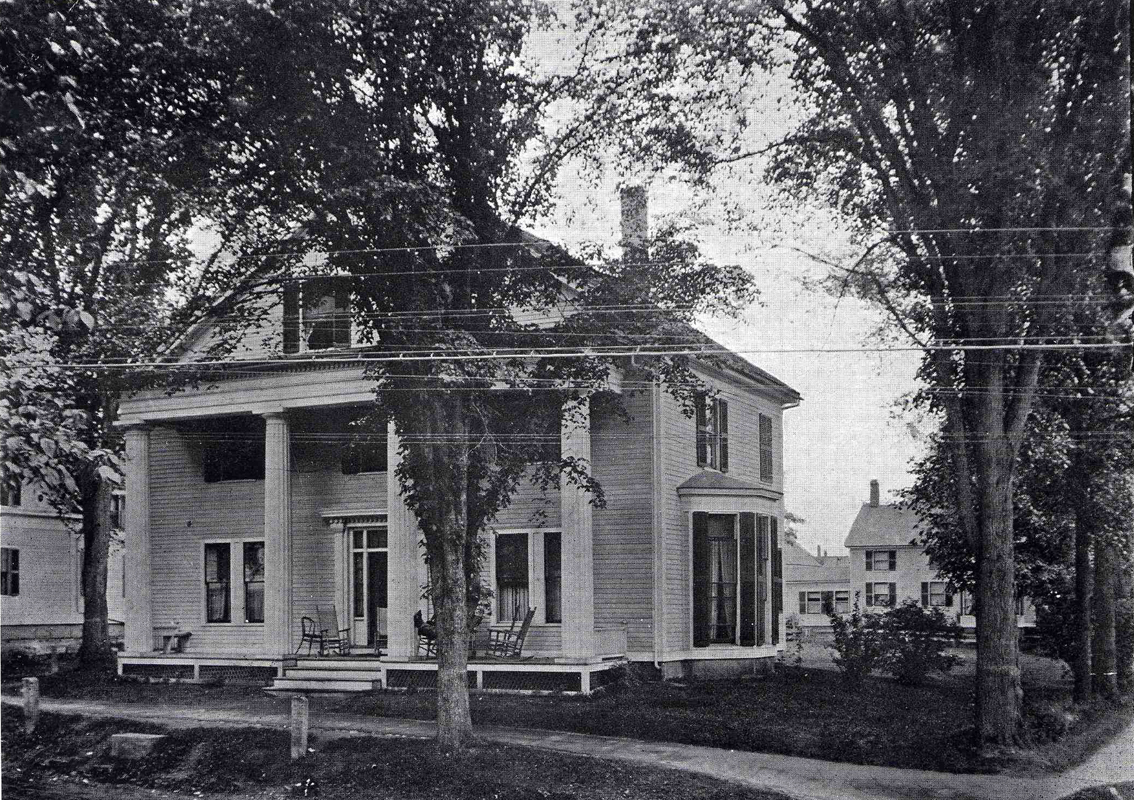
Phi Gamma Delta chapter house, circa 1915

Tau Epsilon Phi (ΤΕΦ) was established at Dartmouth College in 1950 as the Epsilon Delta chapter of the national fraternity. The Dartmouth chapter dissociated from the national in 1969 and voted to call itself the Harold Parmington Foundation.

=== Phi Gamma Delta ===
Phi Gamma Delta (ΦΓΔ), was founded at Dartmouth College as the Delta Nu chapter of the national fraternity in 1901. The Dartmouth chapter seceded from the national fraternity in 1965 and adopted the name Phoenix. The new local fraternity dissolved in 1971. The fraternity has no association with the Phoenix all-female senior society founded at Dartmouth in 1984.

=== Phi Kappa Psi ===
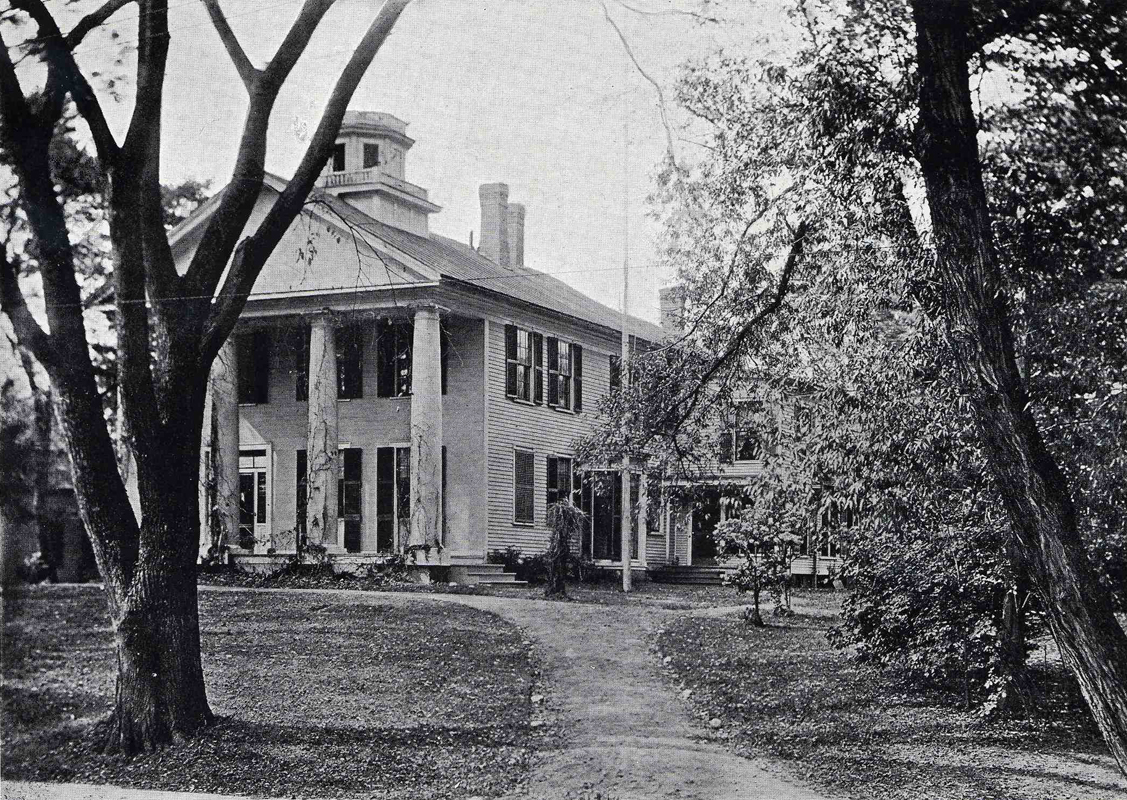
Phi Kappa Psi chapter house, circa 1915

Phi Kappa Psi (ΦΚΨ), commonly called Phi Psi, traces its heritage at Dartmouth College to the Beta Psi local fraternity, founded in 1895. Beta Psi became the New Hampshire Alpha chapter of Phi Kappa Psi in 1896. The Dartmouth chapter dissociated from the national in 1967 over the national's reaction to the chapter's pledging of a black student, and adopted the new name Phi Sigma Psi. Phi Sigma Psi was one of the six fraternities that adopted a formal coeducational membership policy in 1972. In the late 1980s, the membership began referring to the organization as Phi Psi/Panarchy. The fraternity changed its name to The Panarchy in 1991. In 1993, the college began a program for "undergraduate societies" as open-membership alternatives to the Greek system. In September 1993, the members of Panarchy voted to disaffiliate from the Greek system and became the first of two undergraduate societies.

== See also ==
- College fraternities and sororities
- Dartmouth College student groups
- List of social fraternities
- List of social sororities and women's fraternities
