= USS Chandler =

Two ships in the United States Navy have been named USS Chandler. The first was named for William E. Chandler and the second for Theodore E. Chandler.

- USS Chandler (DD-206), was a Clemson-class destroyer, commissioned in 1919, served in World War II and decommissioned in 1945.
- USS Chandler (DDG-996), was a Kidd-class destroyer, commissioned in 1982 and decommissioned in 1999. She was transferred to Taiwan.

== See also ==
- USS Theodore E. Chandler (DD-717), a Gearing-class destroyer
