= USS Buchanan =

Three ships of the United States Navy have been named Buchanan, in honor of Captain (USN), Admiral (CSN) Franklin Buchanan.

- USS Buchanan (DD-131), was a Wickes-class destroyer, transferred to the Royal Navy as HMS Campbeltown.
- USS Buchanan (DD-484), was a Gleaves-class destroyer, commissioned in 1942 and decommissioned in 1946. She was transferred to the Turkish Navy as Gelibolu.
- USS Buchanan (DDG-14), was a Charles F. Adams-class guided missile destroyer, commissioned in 1962 and decommissioned in 1991.
