= Navasota (disambiguation) =

Navasota is a city in Texas.

Navasota may also refer to:

- Navasota (moth), a genus of moth
- Navasota River, a river in Texas
- USS Navasota (AO-106), a fleet replenishment oiler in service from 1946 to 1975
- USNS Navasota (T-AO-106), a fleet replenishment oiler in non-commissioned service from 1975 to 1991
