= Lloyd H. Chandler =

United States Navy admiral (1867–1947)

- Born: Lloyd Horwitz Chandler; August 17, 1869; Washington, DC, US
- Died: January 17, 1947 (aged 77); Washington, DC, US
- Education: United States Naval Academy
- Children: Theodore E. Chandler
- Relatives: William E. Chandler (father); Lucy Lambert Hale (step-mother)
- Military career
- Allegiance: United States
- Branch: United States Navy
- Service years: 1890-1921
- Rank: Rear admiral
- Commands: USS Bailey; USS Decatur; USS Illinois; USS Salem; USS Nebraska; USS New Hampshire
- Conflicts: Spanish-American War; World War I
- Awards: Navy Cross

Lloyd Horwitz Chandler (17 August 1869 – 17 January 1947) was a rear admiral in the United States Navy, serving for over 30 years. He was awarded the Navy Cross for his actions in World War I. He was the son of William E. Chandler, who served as Secretary of the Navy, and the father of Rear Admiral Theodore E. Chandler.

== Biography ==
Lloyd Horwitz Chandler was born in Washington, DC, on August 17, 1869, son of William Eaton Chandler, one time Assistant Secretary of the Treasury, Secretary of the Navy under President Chester A. Arthur, and U.S. Senator from New Hampshire, and Anne Caroline (née Gilmore) Chandler, daughter of New Hampshire’s Governor Joseph A. Gilmore.

Chandler attended private schools and entered the United States Naval Academy on appointment as Naval Cadet from the Second District of New Hampshire on September 4, 1884, at the age of fifteen. He graduated in June 1888, and served the two years at sea, which was then required by law, and was commissioned Ensign from July 1, 1890.

After graduation from the Naval Academy in 1888, he served successively in the USS Boston, the USS Portsmouth, and the USS Concord. On June 1, 1893, he reported to the Secretary of the Treasury for duty on board the Coast Survey Schooner Eagre. He had duty at the Naval Academy from September 1894 until June 1896, during which time he participated in the summer cruise on board the USS Monongahela. He next had sea duty, assigned consecutively to the USS Marblehead, USS Minneapolis and USS San Francisco, participating in the Spanish-American War in the latter. He served from November 1898 to April as Inspector of Equipment for various ships including the USS Connecticut, and as Inspector of Ordnance at Bath Iron Works.

In May 1899 he joined the USS Makenzie, and from June 29 until August 21, 1899, commanded that vessel. He served briefly on board the USS Scorpion and after eight months’ duty in the Bureau of Ordnance, Navy Department, Washington, DC, reported in June 1900 to the USS Massachusetts. In October of that year, he returned to the Bureau of Ordnance, and in July of that year reported to the Torpedo Station, Newport, Rhode Island, thence to command of the USS Bailey. He assumed command of the USS Decatur at her commissioning on May 12, 1902, and on June 5 was given command of the first Flotilla consisting five destroyers, for a trip from Norfolk, Virginia, to Manila, Philippines, in 1903-1904.

In April 1904 he was ordered to Tokyo, Japan, as Assistant to the U.S. Naval Attaché, at the US Legation there, and later that month reported to the Commander China Station, for brief duty. On return of the Naval Attaché in August of that year, he was ordered to Washington, DC, for temporary duty in the Office of Naval Intelligence. He served in the Bureau of Ordnance from January 1905 until June 1906, with additional duty under instruction in the Compass Office, Bureau of Equipment. At her commissioning on September 29, 1906, he joined the USS Connecticut, and served as her Executive Officer briefly before being detached for duty as Aid on the Staff of the Commander in Chief, Atlantic Fleet. On May 15, 1908, he reported to the Bureau of Navigation, Navy Department, where he served until November 1911.

Assuming command of the USS Salem on November 7, 1911, he had additional temporary duty in command of the USS Illinois from May 20, 1912, until the departure of the Salem from Boston, and continued as Commanding Officer of the Illinois until November 2, that year. He then commanded the USS Nebraska for a month, returning to command the Illinois from December 16, 1912, until September 5, 1913. That month, he began a tour of duty at the Naval Academy as Head of the Department of Ordnance and Gunnery He next served as the Academy's Commandant of Midshipman from June 5 to October 20, 1915.

He served for a month as a Member of the General Board, Navy Department, and on December 4, 1915, assumed command of the USS New Hampshire. He commanded that battleship throughout most of World War I, being detached on October 14, 1918, to serve as Chief of Staff to Commander Battleship Force One, Atlantic Fleet.

He was awarded the Navy Cross, with the following citation:

For exceptionally meritorious service duty of great responsibility as Commanding Officer, USS New Hampshire and a Chief of Staff to the Commander of Battleship Force One, Atlantic Fleet.

Detached from the staff duty on April 15, 1919, he completed a course of instruction at the Naval War College. In the rank of Rear Admiral, he served as a Representative of the Navy Department on the U.S. Geographic Board from 1920 to 1921. He was also assigned to the Bureau of Navigation, Navy Department, as Hydrographer, from June 23, 1920 until July 28, 1921. He served as Commander Train, Atlantic Fleet, from July 30 to December 10, 1921.

He was advanced to the rank of Rear Admiral on November 23, 1919, and was commissioned Rear Admiral on the Retired List (by Act of June 21, 1930), having retired in the rank of Captain after 30 years’ service, on December 30, 1921.

In addition to the Navy Cross, Rear Admiral Chandler had been awarded a Special Letter of Commendation by the War Department, and had the Spanish Campaign Medal (USS Francisco), and the World War I Victory Medal, with Escort Clasp (USS New Hampshire).

Chandler died on January 17, 1947 in Washington, DC. He was survived by his wife Agatha Buford (née Edson) Chandler and his daughter Agatha M. Downing.
