= Lucy Lambert Hale =

American socialite (1841–1915)

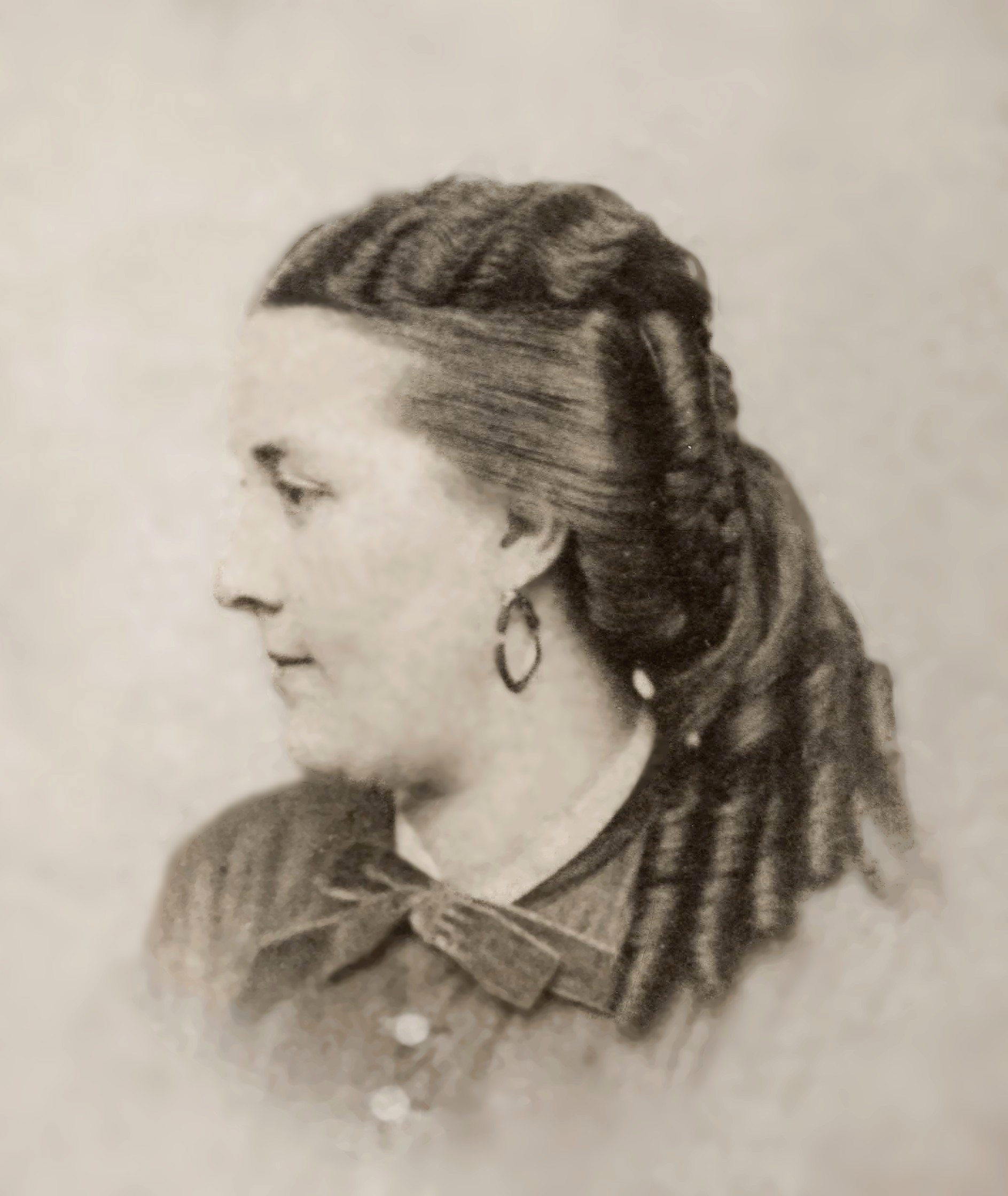
- Photograph of Hale found on John Wilkes Booth
- Born: January 1, 1841; Dover, New Hampshire
- Died: October 15, 1915 (aged 74)
- Burial place: Pine Hill Cemetery
- Occupation: Socialite
- Known for: Fiancée of presidential assassin John Wilkes Booth
- Political party: Democratic
- Spouse: William E. Chandler (m. 1874–1915)
- Children: John Parker Hale Chandler Sr
- Parent(s): John Parker Hale; Lucy Hill Lambert

Lucy Lambert Hale (January 1, 1841 – October 15, 1915) was an American socialite. Hale was a daughter of United States Senator John Parker Hale of New Hampshire, and was a noted Washington, D.C., society belle. She attracted many admirers including Oliver Wendell Holmes Jr., Robert Todd Lincoln; and stage actor and presidential assassin John Wilkes Booth, to whom she was secretly engaged. Lucy's photograph was found in Booth's pocket after Sergeant Boston Corbett mortally wounded Booth 12 days after he assassinated Abraham Lincoln.

Hale later married William E. Chandler, a future United States Senator and United States Secretary of the Navy.

== Early years ==
Lucy Hale was born on January 1, 1841, in Dover, New Hampshire, the second eldest daughter of U.S. Senator John Parker Hale and Lucy Hill Lambert, daughter of William Thomas Lambert and Abigail Ricker. She was described as "pretty, precocious, sweet and good". At the age of 12, she was receiving poems from a Harvard University student by the name of William Chandler, who she would later marry. He was the first of her many admirers, which also included Oliver Wendell Holmes Jr. whom she met on vacation in Maine and with whom she began a romantic correspondence in 1858 when she was 17 years old. At that time, she was described as having had "dark hair, blue eyes, a clear skin, and a stunning figure". Her manner toward men was a "subtle brew of flattery, teasing and cajoling; of rapt attention laced with a hints of indifference and occasionally a touch of cruelty". She was shortly afterwards enrolled at a boarding school in Boston.

Another of her admirers was Robert Todd Lincoln, eldest son of the future American president Abraham Lincoln. Her father had entertained the hope that Lucy would marry Robert; and although Senator Hale's wishes did not come to fruition, the couple would remain good friends for many years.

== Relationship with John Wilkes Booth ==
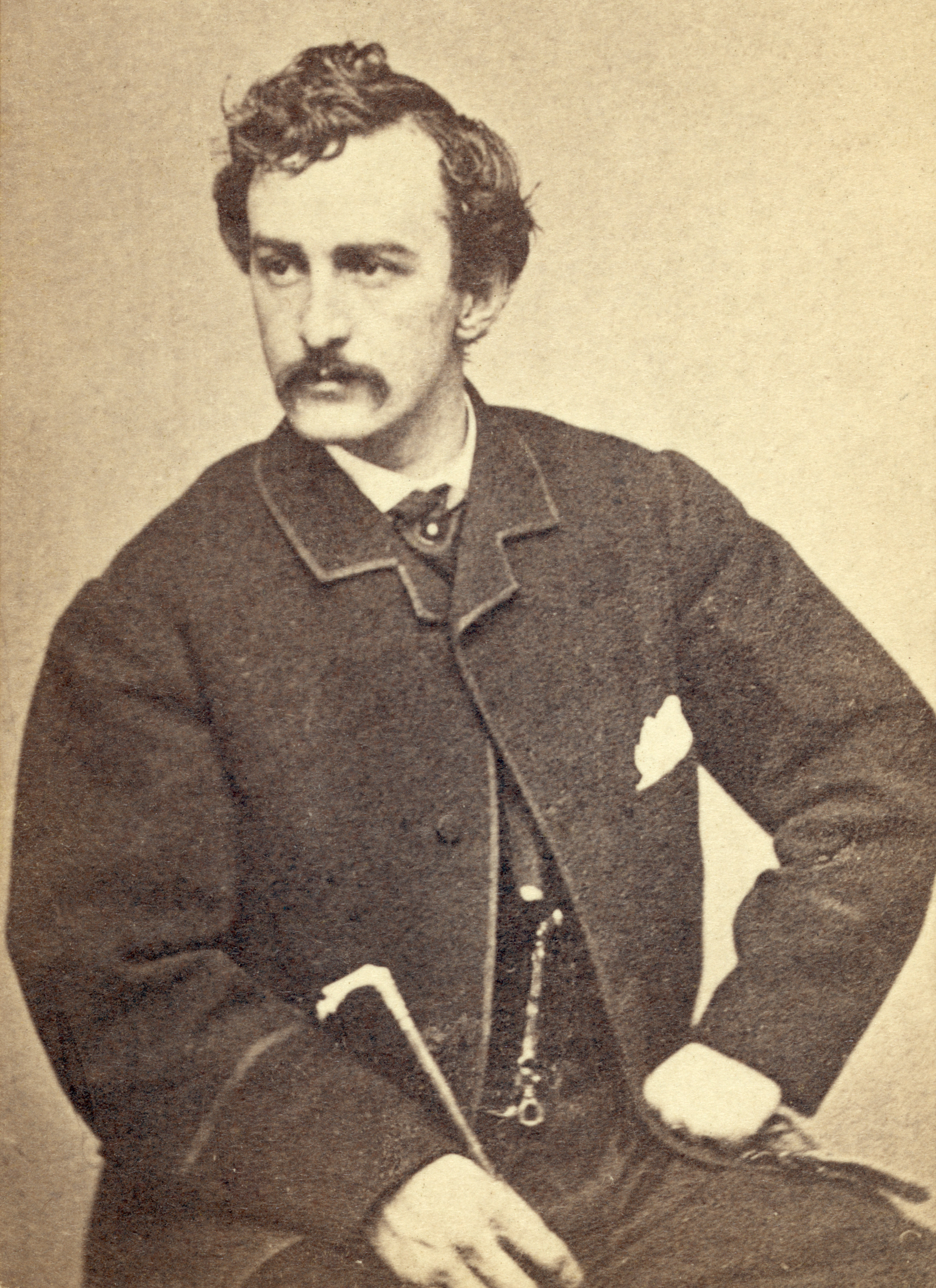
John Wilkes Booth, actor and assassin of President Abraham Lincoln, was Hale's secret fiancé

When the Civil War broke out in April 1861, she, her parents, and her sister Elizabeth went to live at the National Hotel in Washington, D.C., and she began working for the Sanitation Committee. She was seen at many parties, dances, and social functions and was one of the belles of Washington society. She and her mother also visited the soldiers at the front lines when there was a cessation of fighting.

On Valentine's Day, 1862 or 1865, she received an anonymous note from John Wilkes Booth, a wildly popular stage actor and notorious ladies man, in which he wrote:

My dear Miss Hale, were it not for the License with a time-honored observance of this day allows, I had not written you this poor note. ... You resemble in a most remarkable degree a lady, very dear to me, now dead and your close resemblance to her surprised me the first time I saw you. This must be my apology for any apparent rudeness noticeable. To see you has indeed afforded me a melancholy pleasure, if you can conceive of such, and should we never meet nor I see you again believe me, I shall always associate you in my memory, with her, who was very beautiful, and whose face, like your own I trust, was a faithful index of gentleness and amiability. With a Thousand kind wishes for your future happiness I am, to you,
A Stranger.

His courtship of Hale was conducted with much secrecy, but by early 1865, they were often seen together in public, and became clandestinely engaged. On March 4, 1865, Booth attended Lincoln's second presidential inauguration with a ticket that Lucy had procured through her father. On March 17, his mother, Mary Ann wrote Booth:

The secret you have told me is not exactly a secret as Edwin (Booth's brother) was told by someone, you were paying great attention to a young lady in Washington, and if the lady in question is all you desire- I see no cause why you should not try to secure her. ... Her father ... would he give his consent?

By this time, Booth was already heavily involved in his plan to kidnap President Lincoln, which miscarried and evolved into the assassination plot. There was no reason to suspect that Hale knew anything of the plot to kill the president, nor was she aware of the deep antipathy her fiancé felt towards Lincoln. Hale's father was an outspoken abolitionist. Hale and Booth had begun to quarrel during this time, according to Booth's sister Asia who later reported that Booth had become enraged when he saw Hale dancing with the President's son and her erstwhile admirer, Robert Todd Lincoln, one evening at the National Hotel.

=== Lincoln's assassination ===
Hale's photograph (second from left) was among the belongings found on the body of John Wilkes Booth on April 26, 1865.

On the afternoon of April 14, Hale allegedly spent the afternoon studying Spanish with Robert Lincoln, and another former admirer, John Hay, President Lincoln's assistant private secretary. Her father had just been appointed United States ambassador to Spain, and she and her mother were making preparations to accompany him to his new post. According to some witnesses, Booth and Hale had met that morning at the National Hotel and in the evening, Booth had dined with Hale and her mother. At 8 p.m. he allegedly looked at his watch, stood up, and after taking her hand in his, recited some lines from William Shakespeare's Hamlet: "Nymph, in thy orisons [prayers], be all my sins remembered".

When Booth shot and mortally wounded President Lincoln that night at Ford's Theatre, their romance came to an abrupt end. She was devastated by the news, and found it impossible to believe her fiancé had been the assassin. A few evenings before the assassination, Booth had taken her to a performance at Ford's. She wrote a letter to his brother, Edwin, expressing her shock and sorrow, while her father published notices in the press denying there had ever been an "intimate connection" between his daughter and Booth.

When Booth was later shot and killed on April 26, by Boston Corbett, five photographs of women were discovered in his pocket, and one of them was of Lucy. There were rumors that she had gone, heavily veiled, aboard the USS Montauk in the Washington Navy Yard to view the body of Booth which lay in one of the cabins, and upon seeing it, threw herself on him, sobbing. She was not called by the Secretary of War, Edwin Stanton, to testify at the trial of Booth's co-conspirators.

== Marriage and later life ==
In the wake of the assassination, Hale accompanied her parents to Spain, where her father took up his post as United States Ambassador to Spain. She remained in Europe for five years, during which time she received and refused many offers of marriage from titled aristocrats. France, Italy, and Switzerland, were among the countries she visited; in Paris she attended the theatre with her former beaux Oliver Wendell Holmes Jr., John Hay, and Frederick Anderson.

In 1870, she returned to America to care for her sick father, and renewed a correspondence with her first admirer, the successful corporation lawyer William E. Chandler, whose wife, Ann Gilmore had died. They were married in 1874 and in March 1875, her only son, John Parker Hale Chandler, was born. In 1882, Hale's husband became Secretary of the Navy, and in 1887, a United States senator. She immersed herself in politics at her husband's side and was a successful hostess at the many social functions Chandler held in Washington.

== Death ==
Hale died on October 15, 1915, and is buried at Pine Hill Cemetery in her hometown of Dover, New Hampshire.

Hale's step-grandson, Theodore E. Chandler, later became a highly decorated Navy Admiral during World War II. He was injured when kamikazes attacked his ship in the Pacific theatre on January 6, 1945. He died the following day.

== Media portrayals ==
Lucy Lambert Hale appeared as a character in the 1998 television film The Day Lincoln Was Shot. She was portrayed by American actress Jean Louisa Kelly, with Rob Morrow in the role of John Wilkes Booth.
