= USS Ozbourn =

Gearing-class destroyer

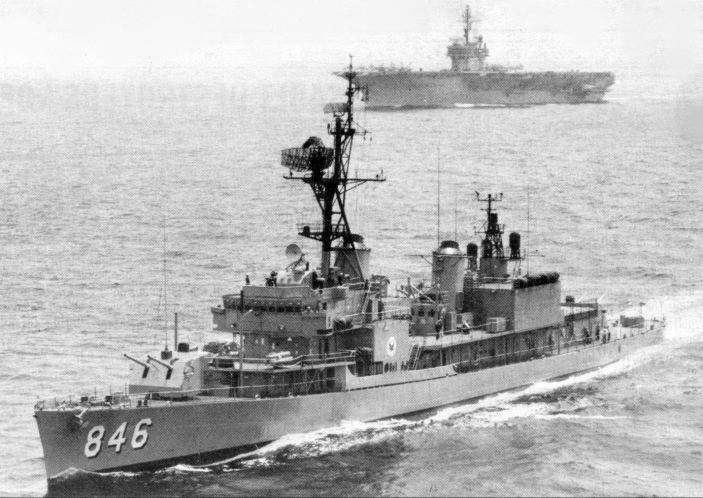
- USS Ozbourn with USS Kitty Hawk in 1963

History

United States
- Name: USS Ozbourn
- Namesake: Joseph W. Ozbourn
- Laid down: 16 June 1945
- Launched: 22 December 1945
- Commissioned: 5 March 1946
- Stricken: 1 June 1975
- Identification: Callsign: NBCC; Hull number: DD-846
- Fate: Sold for scrap, 1 December 1975

General characteristics
- Class & type: Gearing-class destroyer
- Displacement: 2,425 tons
- Length: 390 ft 6 in (119.02 m)
- Beam: 41 ft 1 in (12.52 m)
- Draft: 18 ft 6 in (5.64 m)
- Propulsion: 2 × geared turbines; 2 × propellers
- Speed: 35 kn (65 km/h; 40 mph)
- Range: 4,500 nmi (8,300 km; 5,200 mi) at 20 kn (37 km/h; 23 mph)
- Complement: 336 officers and enlisted
- Armament: 6 × 5 in (130 mm)/38 guns, 16 × 40 mm AA guns, 20 × 20 mm AA guns, 5 × 21 in (533 mm) torpedo tubes, 6 × depth charge projectors, 2 × depth charge tracks

USS Ozbourn (DD-846) was a Gearing-class destroyer in the United States Navy during the Korean War and the Vietnam War. She was named for Marine Private Joseph W. Ozbourn (1919–1944), who was awarded the Medal of Honor posthumously for his "great personal valor" during the Battle of Tinian.

Ozbourn was laid down by Bath Iron Works on 16 June 1945. The destroyer was launched on 22 December 1945, sponsored by Mrs. Joseph W. Ozbourn. The vessel was commissioned on 5 March 1946.

== Pacific duty ==
Following shakedown, Ozbourn reported for duty with the U.S. Pacific Fleet at San Diego, California in August 1946. She departed San Diego 6 January 1947 with Destroyer Division 171 (DesDiv 171) for the Far East; returned to San Diego in October; began her next deployment 1 October 1948, shortened by a collision with Theodore E. Chandler. Although two crew members were killed, damage control parties saved the ship, and she returned to Long Beach Naval Shipyard for repairs. During 1949 and early 1950, Ozbourn trained midshipmen, underwent overhaul and participated in various exercises, one of which was the first guided missile test at sea conducted with Norton Sound.

== Korean War ==
When hostilities began in Korea, Ozbourn joined Task Force 77 (TF 77). She participated in the Inchon landing, the Blockade of Wonsan and assisted with air operations off the Korean coast, twice receiving the Korean Presidential Citation for her efforts. In February 1951, despite having received two direct hits and several near misses from shore batteries the same day, Ozbourn sent her motor whale boat to rescue a downed pilot floating in a mine field. After returning to San Diego for repairs and overhaul and a brief assignment with TF 95 in the Wonsan area, Ozbourn returned to TF 77 in July 1952. In short order she rescued 18 men who had jumped from USS Boxer to avoid a menacing fire and picked up 3 downed airmen from USS Essex. During the next two years Ozbourn made regular tours with the 7th Fleet followed by training operations in the San Diego area.

== Training ship ==
From 1956 to 1964 Ozbourn underwent major overhaul, engaged in intensive training exercises, participated in festivals and celebrations in several west-coast cities and in Australia, and operated periodically with the 7th Fleet. Having undergone Fleet Rehabilitation and Modernization (FRAM) Mark I conversion earlier, she joined Task Group (TG 10) for a major Presidential Demonstration. From the flight deck of Kitty Hawk, President John F. Kennedy watched Ozbourn's ASROC launching 6 June 1963.

== Vietnam War ==
Ozbourn sailed independently for Pearl Harbor 8 July 1964 to join DesDiv 233 and ASW Group 1 for a six-month Western Pacific deployment. From Yokosuka, Japan, ASW Group I sailed for the South China Sea after North Vietnamese PT boats had engaged American destroyers in the Gulf of Tonkin. After providing antisubmarine warfare (ASW) protection for TF 77 and after participating in a naval weapons demonstration, Ozbourn returned to Long Beach. Several months of maintenance, repairs and intermittent local training operations followed; then came another deployment to the Western Pacific 20 August 1965. Attached to TG 77.6, Ozbourn provided gunfire support in the III and IV Corps areas of South Vietnam delivering tons of high explosives in covering fire. Eight crewmen were recommended for decorations during these actions.

In July 1966 Ozbourn began a two-year tour of duty with the 7th Fleet as a member of Destroyer Squadron 9. A great part of that time was spent on gunfire assignments supporting troops in South Vietnam and interdicting supply and communications routes in North Vietnam. She received direct hits on 25 March and 4 December 1967 but continued her mission each time. For "outstanding actions against the enemy and for excellent combat readiness", she received both the Meritorious Unit Commendation and the Battle Efficiency "E".

Ozbourn returned to Long Beach 6 September 1968 and remained there, with intermittent movements to Portland and San Diego, for the next year. In September 1969 she deployed again to WestPac, where she operated with the 7th Fleet into 1970.

On 13 November 1970 (Friday the 13th) Ozbourn left Long Beach for a six-month operational deployment in the western Pacific to Vietnam. Subic Bay, Philippines, was its deployed base. On 1 January 1971 Ozbourn joined up with the USS Hancock Task Group at Yankee Station in the South China Sea. 11 January Ozbourn transferred from the USS Hancock Task Group to the USS Ranger Task Group. Ozbourn also took on oil from USS Kawishiwi (AO-146). The third week of January, USS Ozbourn was in Hong Kong. The fourth week of January, they did repair work in Subic Bay, Philippines. From 1 to 21 February Ozbourn was on the gun-line at the Vietnam Demilitarized Zone (DMZ) to provide naval gunfire support. On 21 February it docked briefly to a pier in Da Nang Harbor. The following two days were spent USS Ranger at Yankee Station. From 24 February through 2 March the destroyer patrolled Northern Search & Rescue Station (SAR) with USS Halsey. On 3 March the vessel sailed to Subic Bay for 40-hour upkeep. On 5 March they celebrated Ozbourn's 25th anniversary. From 15 through 31 March Ozbourn was deployed at Yankee Station with USS Kitty Hawk (CV-63). From 1–11 April, first day Ozbourn tied up at a pier in Da Nang, then Ozbourn steamed to the 2nd and 3rd Mil. Region of the gunline in the south. On 11 April Ozbourn docked briefly to the piers in Da Nang Harbor. From 12 to 23 April Ozbourn was stationed on the gunline at Vietnam DMZ. The ship left on 23 April for Subic Bay. Two days later Ozbourn departed Subic Bay for Long Beach. On 13 May 1971, Ozbourn arrived at Long Beach Naval Station. On 15 June Destroyer Division 92 was decommissioned, and Ozbourn transferred to Destroyer Squadron 19. On 17 June Ozbourn left Long Beach on a midshipman cruise to San Francisco, Seattle and Tacoma, Washington, and Pearl Harbor. The destroyer returned to Long Beach on 4 August. From 20 September through 18 January 1972, Ozbourn left the Mole and entered Long Beach Naval Shipyard dry dock for a four-month shipyard overhaul.

On 10 April Ozbourn left for a WestPac deployment to Vietnam. On 9 May 1972, along with several other ships of the US 7th Fleet, she supported minelaying efforts in Haiphong Harbor. This resulted in her being bombarded by the shore batteries of North Vietnam, but there were no direct hits. Sailors on board for this action were subsequently authorized to wear the USN/USMC Combat Action Ribbon. Ozbourn eventually returned stateside on 10 November.

She was struck from the Naval Vessel Register on 1 June 1975 and sold for scrap.
