= USS Theodore E. Chandler =

United States Navy Gearing-class destroyer

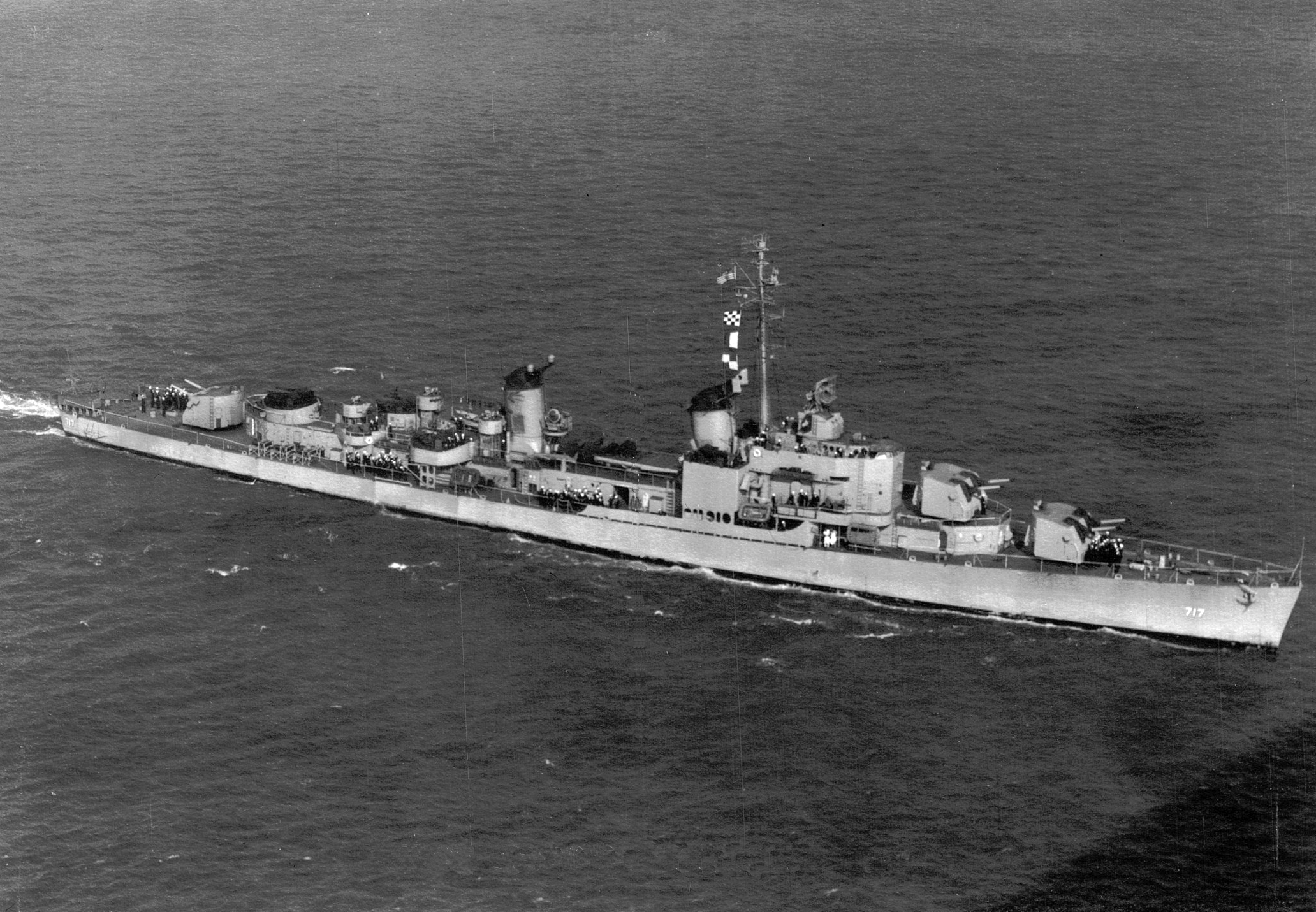
- USS Theodore E. Chandler (DD-717)

History

United States
- Name: USS Theodore E. Chandler
- Namesake: Theodore E. Chandler
- Builder: Federal Shipbuilding Company
- Laid down: 23 April 1945
- Launched: 20 October 1945
- Commissioned: 22 March 1946
- Modernized: 1961-1962 (FRAM IB)
- Decommissioned: 1 April 1975
- Stricken: 1 April 1975
- Identification: Callsign: NHUK; Hull number: DD-717
- Fate: Sold for scrap, 30 December 1975

General characteristics
- Class & type: Gearing-class destroyer
- Displacement: 2,425 long tons (2,464 t) (standard); 3,460 long tons (3,520 t) (full)
- Length: 390 ft 6 in (119.0 m) (overall)
- Beam: 40 ft 10 in (12.45 m)
- Draft: 14 ft 4 in (4.37 m)
- Propulsion: 2 × geared turbines; 2 × propellers
- Speed: 35 kn (65 km/h; 40 mph)
- Range: 4,500 nmi (8,300 km; 5,200 mi) at 20 kn (37 km/h; 23 mph)
- Complement: 336 officers and enlisted
- Armament: 6 × 5 in (127 mm)/38 caliber guns; 12 × 40 mm (1.6 in) Bofors AA guns; 11 × 20 mm (0.79 in) Oerlikon AA cannons; 10 × 21 in (533 mm) torpedo tubes; 6 × depth charge projectors; 2 × depth charge tracks

USS Theodore E. Chandler (DD-717) was a Gearing-class destroyer in the United States Navy during the Korean War and the Vietnam War. She was named for Theodore E. Chandler.

Theodore E. Chandler was laid down on 23 April 1945 at Kearny, New Jersey, by the Federal Shipbuilding Company; launched on 20 October 1945; sponsored by Mrs. Theodore E. Chandler; and commissioned on 22 March 1946.

== 1946–1949 ==
After shakedown near Guantanamo Bay, Cuba, she escorted Saipan and Leyte while the two aircraft carriers trained new pilots. Then, on 20 September, she stood out of New York bound for the west coast. The destroyer transited the Panama Canal on 26 September and joined Destroyer Squadron (DesRon) 17 at San Diego on 7 October. After amphibious and fleet exercises on the west coast, she departed San Diego on 6 January 1947 bound for Japan.

The warship reached Yokosuka on 25 January. Operating from Japan—where she called at such places as Fukuoka, Kagoshima, and Sasebo—she visited Tsingtao, Hong Kong, Shanghai, and Amoy to keep a wary eye on the events occurring in China until she returned to San Diego on 20 September.

After operating along the west coast for the next year, Theodore E. Chandler headed west on 1 October 1948 for her second tour of duty in the western Pacific. That assignment was abbreviated on 24 November when she collided with the destroyer Ozbourn during highspeed, darkened-ship, night maneuvers off Tsingtao. After stops at Tsingtao and at Yokosuka for temporary repairs, she headed back to the west coast on 14 January 1949. The destroyer reached Long Beach on 5 February and, after completing a five-month repair period, resumed operations along the Pacific coast which, save for a run to Pearl Harbor in the fall of 1949, occupied her until events in Korea summoned her back to the Orient.

== Korean War ==
When the North Korean People's Army invaded South Korea on 25 June 1950, Theodore E. Chandler was operating out of San Diego. She spent another nine days at sea; then joined the cruiser Helena and the rest of Destroyer Division (DesDiv) 111 to form the first unit dispatched from the west coast to the new Asian conflict. After brief stops at Pearl Harbor and Yokosuka, she arrived in Sasebo on 25 July.

A brief conference held there organized the various support and escort forces into Task Force (TF) 96. Theodore E. Chandler became a unit of Task Group (TG) 96.5, the Japan-Korea Support Group, made up of an escort element, a west Korean supporting element, and two east Korean support elements. DesDiv 111, with Helena as flagship, made up one of the rotating, east Korean support elements. On 26 July, the unit departed Sasebo and shaped a course for Korea to conduct shore bombardments in support of United Nations (UN) land forces. En route, however, the task element received orders changing its destination to the Taiwan Strait. Chandler and her sister warships completed their mission in the narrow waters separating Taiwan from communist-controlled mainland China and headed for Japan on 2 August. The ships reached Sasebo on 4 August and departed again three days later. Finally, on 7 August, they took up station off the Korean coast.

Initially, they delivered gunfire to relieve the pressure upon the northeastern end of the Pusan perimeter. During her first assignment, Theodore E. Chandler steamed to Yongdok to bombard supply lines running south along the coast, bypassing the ROK 3rd Division isolated at Chongha, and on toward Pohang where UN lines ended at the Sea of Japan. On 14 August, the destroyer joined Helena near Sinchang, when the two ships destroyed a North Korean supply train and damaged several bridges and tunnels. By the following day, North Korean pressure on the Chongha enclave had become so intense that Lt. Gen. Walton H. Walker evacuated the ROK 3rd Division by sea. While shipping for the evacuation assembled, the situation at Chongha continued to deteriorate, but the 3rd Division relied upon the gunfire delivered by Chandler and the other ships of the Helena task element to hold back North Korean forces. Even after the carrier planes arrived on the afternoon of 16 August and started close support, the destroyer and her sisters continued to help Helena support the ROK forces during the two more days it took to complete the evacuation.

On 18 August, Theodore E. Chandler retired from the Korean coast with the rest of the Helena group and set course for Japan. The task element reached Sasebo that same day but on the 23rd returned to Korean waters. The next day, Chandler and the other destroyers of DesDiv 111 aided Helena bombard the railroad cars and warehouses at Tanchon. On 26 August, the task element arrived off Pohang to relieve the Toledo unit in supporting the northeastern end of the UN line. The warships remained in that area with Helena until 29 August when they returned to Sasebo for an overnight stopover and, the next day, resumed station off Pohang. After three days off the east coast of Korea, the destroyer reentered Sasebo on 2 September. Ten days later, she headed for the western coast of Korea and the amphibious operation at Inchon.

For almost a month, Chandler cruised the waters of the Yellow Sea. The destroyer helped soften the positions until the landings on 15 September and, after that, covered the amphibious forces and conducted bombardments which aided the troops ashore in advancing. Early in October, she completed her mission in the Yellow Sea and returned to Sasebo on 5 October. During the next two months, she operated along Korea's eastern coast, interdicting communist supply lines with gunfire. Early in December, she made a brief stop at Sasebo before beginning a month of duty on station off Hungnam. During the evacuation of UN troops from that North Korean port, Theodore E. Chandler once again had the opportunity to aid land forces—hard-pressed since the intervention of communist China in late November—to hold a precarious perimeter during an evacuation operation. Theodore E. Chandler remained in the general neighborhood for an additional two weeks.

Between 8 and 19 January 1951, she returned to Sasebo and enjoyed her first extended period in port in over three months. When the destroyer put to sea again, she began screening the fast carriers of TF 77. For the two months of combat duty before she returned to the United States, the warship alternated between bombardment duty and assignments with the fast carriers. On 9 March, she cleared Korean waters to return home; and, after one-day stops at Yokosuka, Pearl Harbor, and San Francisco, the destroyer arrived back in San Diego on 25 March.

Theodore E. Chandler returned to Korea for a second tour of duty during the winter of 1951 and 1952. She served with both TF 77, screening the carriers, and with the UN Blockading and Escort Force (TF 95). The latter duty proved to be more variegated because it involved blockade duty, escort duty, and frequent coastal bombardment missions. Short tours of duty patrolling the Taiwan Strait, visits to Japan, and liberty calls at Hong Kong all served to break up her long stretches of service along the Korean coast.

Her third and final Korean War deployment lasted from January to mid-August 1953 and, with it, came more of the same type of duty she encountered during the preceding assignment. That tour also brought an end to the hostilities when both sides agreed to an armistice. The destroyer remained in the vicinity of Korea for three weeks after hostilities officially ended and then returned to the United States.

== Interwar years ==
Theodore E. Chandler deployed to the Far East seven times; and, for the most part, she busied herself in training exercises with 7th Fleet units and with Allied naval units such as those of the Taiwan Navy. She also served periodically with the Taiwan Strait patrol. When not deployed to the Orient, the destroyer trained with 1st Fleet units along the west coast. Most frequently, she conducted antisubmarine warfare (ASW) drills with hunter-killer groups built around aircraft carriers specially modified to stalk submarines. Finally, during that period, she entered the yard twice for rather extensive repairs and modifications. In mid-February 1961, the destroyer began a year-long Fleet Rehabilitation and Modernization (FRAM) overhaul during which the San Francisco Naval Shipyard refurbished her and brought her physical plant up to date. The second extended yard period came in December 1962, when, after her return from the western Pacific, she entered the yard for repairs to her generating plant which she completed in March 1963. At that time, she resumed training operations in the eastern Pacific where, save for a cruise to Hawaii with the aircraft carrier Bon Homme Richard late in November, she remained until the summer of 1964.

== Vietnam War ==
Theodore E. Chandler's next deployment coincided with the beginning of the United States's extensive buildup in Vietnam. On 19 June, she departed the west coast with ASW Group 1 bound for what appeared to be a normal peacetime deployment to the western Pacific. However, on 2 August, North Vietnamese torpedo boats allegedly made a torpedo attack upon the destroyer Maddox while she cruised international waters in the Gulf of Tonkin. Theodore E. Chandler received orders to join the ASW screen of carriers dispatched to deliver air strikes on North Vietnamese torpedo boat bases. After the strikes, the warship resumed her normal duties with ASW Group 1 and the 7th Fleet.

Theodore E. Chandler returned to Long Beach on 6 January 1965 for an overhaul at the Long Beach Naval Shipyard. After 10 weeks of refresher training and ASW exercises, she began preparations early in August for another deployment to the western Pacific. She departed Long Beach on 20 August and, following a nonstop voyage in company with DesDiv 92 and oilers Kennebec and Navasota, arrived in Yokosuka on 4 September. Four days later, the warship put to sea again bound for the Philippines. Upon her arrival at Subic Bay, she received orders to the Taiwan Strait, and she patrolled those vital waters from 16 to 20 September. When she returned to the Philippines, Theodore E. Chandler began shore bombardment training at the Tabones range.

That duty, however, was interrupted on 30 September by a special assignment off the coast of Indonesia. In response to local political turbulence, Theodore E. Chandler rendezvoused with the 7th Fleet Amphibious Ready Group, and prepared to evacuate United States citizens should the need arise. Fortunately, that eventuality never came to pass. Consequently, the special task organization was dissolved, and Theodore E. Chandler departed the area in company with the destroyer Hollister.

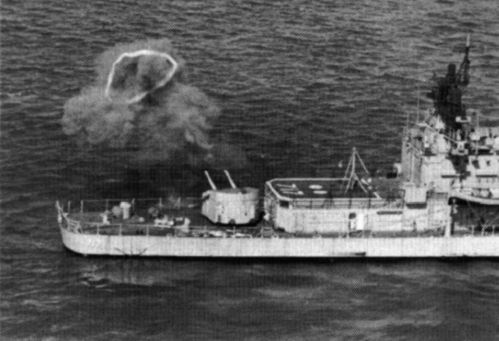
Theodore E. Chandler giving gunfire support in 1966.

During the second portion of the deployment, the warship began regular tours of duty with the naval forces operating off the Vietnamese coastline. On 9 October, she and Hollister joined the aircraft carrier Bon Homme Richard to form Task Group (TG) 77.4 which operated on "Dixie Station"—off the central coast of South Vietnam —until 18 October. The next day, she steamed north with the task group to "Yankee Station" whence planes from Bon Homme Richard struck targets in North Vietnam. After 10 days of air operations, Theodore E. Chandler departed the area with the rest of the task group for five days of rest and relaxation at Hong Kong.

The warships left Hong Kong on 11 November to take up station off the coast of North Vietnam again. On 18 November, the destroyer received orders detaching her from the Bon Homme Richard group for duty as an antiaircraft warfare (AAW) picket ship. After serving 22 days as an AAW picket, she rejoined the carrier group again on 10 December. The carrier launched air strikes during the following eight days; and then, on 18 December, the entire group shaped a course for Subic Bay and thence proceeded to Hong Kong for another five-day port call.

While in Hong Kong, Theodore E. Chandler was detached from TG 77.4 and ordered back to Subic Bay for shore bombardment training. In January 1966, the ship returned to the coast of South Vietnam and rendered naval gunfire support for the troops operating ashore. On one occasion, the destroyer brought her 5-inch guns to bear on Viet Cong forces staging a major attack on Allied troops and received credit for thwarting the guerrillas. In mid-January, she completed her assignment in the Far East and headed back to the United States.

Following four months of duty in and out of Long Beach, Theodore E. Chandler departed that port in June for an extended deployment to the western Pacific. Records of the ship's activities during the 1966 portion of the two years she spent in the Far East are incomplete.

=== Gemini 11 ===
Records do tell that she joined the destroyer Mansfield east of Okinawa during the fall of 1966 to patrol the secondary recovery zone for the Gemini 11 space project. When the capsule splashed down successfully in the primary zone located in the Atlantic Ocean, the two destroyers resumed their normal duties. In mid-October, while en route back to the combat zone, she received orders to join the aircraft carrier Franklin D. Roosevelt and screen that carrier during operations in the Gulf of Tonkin. When the carrier had to return to Yokosuka for repairs in October, Theodore E. Chandler went along as escort.

=== Second Vietnam Tour ===
By early November, the warship had returned to Vietnamese waters. On 13 November, the destroyer responded to a call for help from SS Rutgers Victory, on fire in Nha Trang harbor—about 200 miles (320 km) northeast of Saigon. Within two hours, the destroyer entered the harbor, the first Navy ship to answer the call. Shortly after her arrival, the minesweeper Prime joined the battle against the flames. Chandler's damage control party led the struggle. Two Army tugs concentrated on cooling the victory ship's hull while Chandler and Prime crewmen fought the fires themselves. The combined efforts of two Navy ships, two Army tugs, an Air Force firefighting team, and Rutgers Victory's own crew eventually conquered the blaze, and the warship cleared Nha Trang to resume a heavy schedule of shore bombardment missions.

The beginning of 1967 found her in Yokosuka and off Tokyo Bay for type training. On 16 January, she headed back to Vietnam to resume gunfire support duty. After bombardments in support of the 1st Air Cavalry's Operation "Thayer II" near Qui Nhon in late January and early February, she departed Vietnamese waters to visit Taiwan and to conduct an ASW exercise in the northern Ryukyus.

The destroyer returned to Japan in mid-February and remained there almost a month before taking up duty on "Yankee Station" in the Gulf of Tonkin with Bon Homme Richard on 17 March. Five days later, she shifted her plane-guard service to the carrier Kitty Hawk and remained so employed until 27 March when she joined Bainbridge, Duncan, and Henderson in a fruitless, two-day search for a plane lost at sea. On 29 March, she rejoined Kitty Hawk and headed for Subic Bay, whence she operated through 4 April conducting gunnery drills and ASW exercises.

On 7 April, the destroyer returned to Vietnamese waters. After two days of anti-PT-boat training at Danang, she began duty on the south SAR (Search and Rescue) station. Almost a month later, the destroyer Arnold J. Isbell relieved her; and Theodore E. Chandler returned to Yokosuka on 11 May. The warship remained in Japan until the end of the month; then steamed south to the Philippines. After two days at Subic Bay, she got underway on 5 June to return to the Gulf of Tonkin. On 7 June, she joined the aircraft carrier Constellation on "Yankee Station" and served as the carrier's escort and plane guard for five days.

Theodore E. Chandler parted company with the carrier on 12 June and joined the destroyer Allen M. Sumner for an 11-day assignment with Operation Sea Dragon. The two destroyers moved in close to shore and patrolled the Vietnamese coastline in an effort to interdict enemy waterborne logistics. Working in conjunction with Navy spotter aircraft, they ferreted out enemy cargo barges and sank them with gunfire. On two occasions during the assignment, Theodore E. Chandler came under fire from hostile shore batteries but managed to avoid any hits. The other half of Operation "Sea Dragon" consisted of shore bombardments to destroy depots and marshalling areas as well as to interdict coastal lines of communication. Theodore E. Chandler helped to destroy a number of buildings and to silence several North Vietnamese shore batteries that responded to the ships' barrage. On 23 June, her "Sea Dragon" relief arrived and, after two days of operations with the carrier Hancock, the warship arrived on 29 June in Yokosuka.

Her next line period came during the second week in July. Though it consisted of a mix of assignments similar to previous tours—working with carriers and conducting "Sea Dragon" operations—events occurred to give the duty a slightly different twist in each instance. On 25 July, while the destroyer conducted "Sea Dragon" missions along the coast, the 3d Marine Division called upon her guns to assist them in driving the Viet Cong 806th Battalion west toward waiting South Vietnamese forces. She delivered gunfire along the coast between Quang Tri and Hue and, although the Viet Cong managed to evade the marines, the combined effect of naval gunfire and 3d Division amphibious operations still resulted in a major collision between the evacuating enemy and Allied forces. The operation ended the next day, and Theodore E. Chandler resumed logistics interdiction duty.

Three days later, she was called upon to provide assistance of a different nature. She departed her assigned "Sea Dragon" operating area in company with the Australian destroyer HMAS Hobart to rendezvous with the carrier Forrestal. A fuel tank dropped off one of the carrier's A-4 Skyhawk aircraft during preparations for take-off causing a serious fire. Theodore E. Chandler joined the group of ships assisting the carrier in removing her wounded and dead and in readying her to travel to Subic Bay, the first leg of a voyage back to the United States and major repairs.

The destroyer parted company with the carrier shortly after midnight on 30 July in response to orders to return with HMAS Hobart to "Sea Dragon" duty off Vietnam. On 8 August, she reentered Yokosuka once more for a brief respite from combat duty. From there, she moved to Subic Bay with a task force built around the carrier Coral Sea and, after three days in the Philippines, headed back to Vietnamese waters. During that tour of duty, she provided escort and plane-guard services to Coral Sea and, later, to the carrier Intrepid. Before returning to Yokosuka on 17 October, the warship participated in a series of ASW exercises, visited Hong Kong, and conducted surveillance of Russian trawlers operating in the vicinity.

The destroyer underwent a restricted availability at Yokosuka between mid-October and mid-December. On 12 December, she departed Japan bound for Kaohsiung, Taiwan, where she joined a convoy heading to Vietnam. She departed Kaohsiung on 16 December and relieved the destroyer Hamner in the northern "Sea Dragon" area on 19 December 1967. That duty continued for almost a month until 16 January 1968, when she moved close to the shores of the First and Second Corps Zones of South Vietnam to provide naval gunfire support for the 5th Marines until early February. After another two-week in-port period at Yokosuka, Theodore E. Chandler resumed search and rescue duty on the north SAR station in the Gulf of Tonkin followed by five days of shore bombardment in the First Corps Zone once again from 11 to 16 March. After that assignment, she made a leisurely voyage; first to Subic Bay, thence to Taiwan, and finally to Yokosuka where she remained through the third week in April.

=== 6 May Battle Damage ===
On 23 April, the destroyer headed back to Vietnam where, upon arrival, she started logistics interdiction once more. On 6 May, while the destroyer was engaged in a mission to destroy enemy supply traffic, a shore battery opened up on her and scored two 85-millimeter (3.3 in) hits before she could silence it with counter battery fire. One shell penetrated her hull, caused extensive damage in the crew's shower aft, and wounded one man (took his arm off). The other hit bounced off the skin just outside the forward fire room between the forward electric generators and the electrical panel ("luckily" bouncing off where the two thin hull plates overlapped, resulting in a large dent) and exploded in the water close aboard. This extra quarter-inch of steel saving the ship and the crew of the forward fireroom from having a really bad day [specially the guy standing "forward checks" 9 feet away from the impact point; me]. Emergency repairs enabled the ship to return to duty in only three hours and complete her next scheduled mission. Two days later, Theodore E. Chandler came under enemy fire again, but she easily evaded the 40 rounds thrown at her and the cruiser St. Paul.

On 13 May, she headed back to Subic Bay where her battle damage was quickly repaired enabling the warship to be back in the Gulf of Tonkin by 20 May. PIRAZ duty with the cruiser Long Beach, a visit to Singapore, and the loss of a gunfire spotting drone to enemy antiaircraft fire near the mouth of the Song Giane River highlighted that combat cruise. The destroyer Ozbourn relieved Theodore E. Chandler on 28 June, and she shaped a course for Japan and preparations for the return voyage to the United States. After 11 days in Yokosuka, she and Hollister got underway on a voyage that took them to Brisbane, Australia; Wellington, New Zealand; Pago Pago, Samoa; and Pearl Harbor. The two ships pulled into Long Beach on 25 August, and Theodore E. Chandler ended a long and arduous deployment for which she later received the Navy Unit Commendation.

On 13 February 1969, Theodore E. Chandler completed a four-month overhaul at Long Beach and began 1st Fleet operations along the west coast. After seven months of exercises and training cruises, she departed the west coast on 24 September and headed back to the western Pacific. During that deployment, she spent most of her time at sea off the coast of Vietnam engaged in familiar duty as naval gunfire support ship, SAR picket, and as escort for aircraft carriers. In addition to stops at Sasebo, Yokosuka, and Kaohsiung, she made a port call at Bangkok, Thailand. On 17 March 1970, after six weeks in and out of Sasebo as escort to the carrier Hancock, the destroyer departed Japan to return to the United States. She reached Long Beach on 1 April and resumed operations with the 1st Fleet. That summer, she participated in an NROTC summer training cruise and then spent all of August and most of September in port at Long Beach. Late the following month, she began preparations to return to the western Pacific; and, on 13 November, the warship departed Long Beach.

== Post-Vietnam and decommissioning ==
During the remainder of her career, Theodore E. Chandler made two more deployments to the western Pacific. Though she spent a great deal of time off the coast of Vietnam during both, only the first can be considered a wartime deployment in any real sense. That tour of duty came in the winter of 1970 and 1971 and consisted of duty as plane guard, as SAR picket, and as naval gunfire support ship. The last deployment began in January 1973, after more than 20 months of normal 1st Fleet operations which included a four-month overhaul at the beginning of 1972. However, soon after she arrived in the Far East, the Vietnam ceasefire ended American involvement in the conflict. During the American withdrawal, she cruised the Gulf of Tonkin as plane guard for the aircraft carriers of TF 77 and then returned to the west coast in July. Upon returning to the United States, she resumed normal operations until the fall. On 1 October 1973, the destroyer was transferred to Naval Reserve training duty at Seattle, Washington. Theodore E. Chandler continued that duty until 1 April 1975. On that day, she was decommissioned at Seattle; and her name was struck from the Navy list. On 30 December 1975, she was sold to General Metals, Tacoma, Washington, for scrapping.

Theodore E. Chandler earned nine battle stars during the Korean War and eight battle stars and the Navy Unit Commendation for Vietnam service.

As of 2006, no other ship in the United States Navy has been named Theodore E. Chandler as USS Chandler, Kidd-class guided missile destroyer, was sold to Taiwan in 2004.
