= USS Buchanan (DD-131) =

US destroyer transferred to the UK in WWII and expended in the St. Nazaire Raid

Coordinates: 47°16′34″N 2°11′49″W

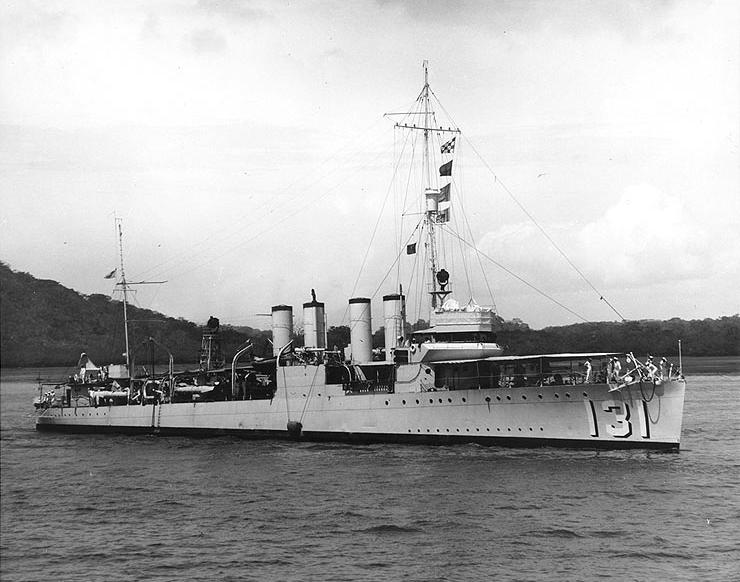
- USS Buchanan off Balboa, Panama, 18 May 1936

History

United States
- Name: USS Buchanan
- Namesake: Franklin Buchanan
- Builder: Bath Iron Works
- Laid down: 29 June 1918
- Launched: 2 January 1919
- Commissioned: 20 January 1919
- Decommissioned: 7 June 1922
- Recommissioned: 10 April 1930
- Decommissioned: 9 April 1937
- Recommissioned: 30 September 1939
- Decommissioned: 9 September 1940
- Stricken: 8 January 1941
- Identification: DD-131
- Fate: Transferred to United Kingdom 9 September 1940

United Kingdom
- Name: HMS Campbeltown
- Commissioned: 9 September 1940
- Identification: Pennant number I42
- Fate: Expended as demolition ship during St. Nazaire Raid. Destroyed 29 March 1942.

General characteristics
- Class & type: Wickes-class destroyer
- Displacement: 1,260 tons
- Length: 314 ft 4 in (95.8 m)
- Beam: 30 ft 6 in (9.3 m)
- Draft: 9 ft 0 in (2.7 m) (light); 12 ft 0 in (3.7 m) (full load)
- Propulsion: 4 × Normand return-flame boilers; Brown-Curtis single reduction geared turbines; 30,000 shp (22,371 kW), 2 shafts
- Speed: 35 knots (65 km/h)
- Complement: 158 officers and enlisted
- Armament: 4 × 4 in (102 mm) guns; 1 × 3 in (76 mm) guns; 2 × 3 21 in (533 mm) torpedo tubes (as built)

USS Buchanan (DD-131), named for Franklin Buchanan, was a Wickes-class destroyer in the United States Navy.

Buchanan was transferred to the United Kingdom under the Destroyers for Bases Agreement in 1940 and served as HMS Campbeltown (I42). She was destroyed during the St. Nazaire Raid: at 1:34 on 28 March 1942, loaded with four tons of amatol explosive, the ship rammed the gates of the Forme Ecluse Louis Joubert dry dock. The ship exploded the following morning, ending the use of the dock for the rest of the war.

== Service with the United States Navy ==
The first USS Buchanan (DD-131) was launched on 2 January 1919 by Bath Iron Works, Bath, Maine; sponsored by Mrs. Charles P. Wetherbee. The ship was commissioned on 20 January 1919. Buchanan reported to Commander, Destroyer Force, at Guantanamo, Cuba, and was temporarily attached to Destroyer Squadron 2 until ordered to the Pacific Fleet in July 1919 for duty with Destroyer Flotilla 4. From 7 June 1922 until 10 April 1930 Buchanan was out of commission at San Diego. She then joined Destroyer Division 10, Destroyer Squadrons, Battle Force, and operated on the West Coast in routine division, force, and fleet activities and problems. It was for this short period that she was commanded by Theodore E. Chandler, who would later become an admiral during World War II and be killed in action in the South Pacific in January 1945. In mid-1934, after making a cruise to Alaska with ROTC units aboard, she was placed in reduced commission attached to Rotating Reserve Destroyer Squadron 20 at San Diego.

Again placed in full commission in December 1934, she resumed operations with Division 5, Destroyers, Battle Force. Buchanan was again out of commission at San Diego from 9 April 1937 until 30 September 1939 at which time she was refitted for action with Division 65, Destroyer Squadron 32, Atlantic Squadron. From December 1939 until 22 February 1940, she operated with the Neutrality Patrol and Antilles Detachment. She was then assigned to patrol in the Gulf of Mexico, operating out of Galveston, Texas and later off Key West and around the Florida Straits. She arrived at Boston Navy Yard on 2 September and then proceeded to Halifax, where on 9 September 1940 she was decommissioned and transferred to the United Kingdom under the Destroyers for Bases Agreement.

== Service with the Royal Navy - HMS Campbeltown (I42) ==
Upon her arrival at HMNB Devonport, England, on 29 September 1940, HMS Campbeltown was allocated to the 7th Escort Group, Liverpool, in the Western Approaches Command. In January 1941 she was provisionally allocated to the Royal Netherlands Navy, but reverted to the Royal Navy in September 1941. Between September 1941 and March 1942 she served with Atlantic convoys and was attacked on several occasions by enemy U-boats and aircraft, but escaped without damage. On 15 September 1941 she picked up the survivors of the Norwegian motor tanker Vinga, damaged by an enemy air attack.

=== Saint-Nazaire Raid ===
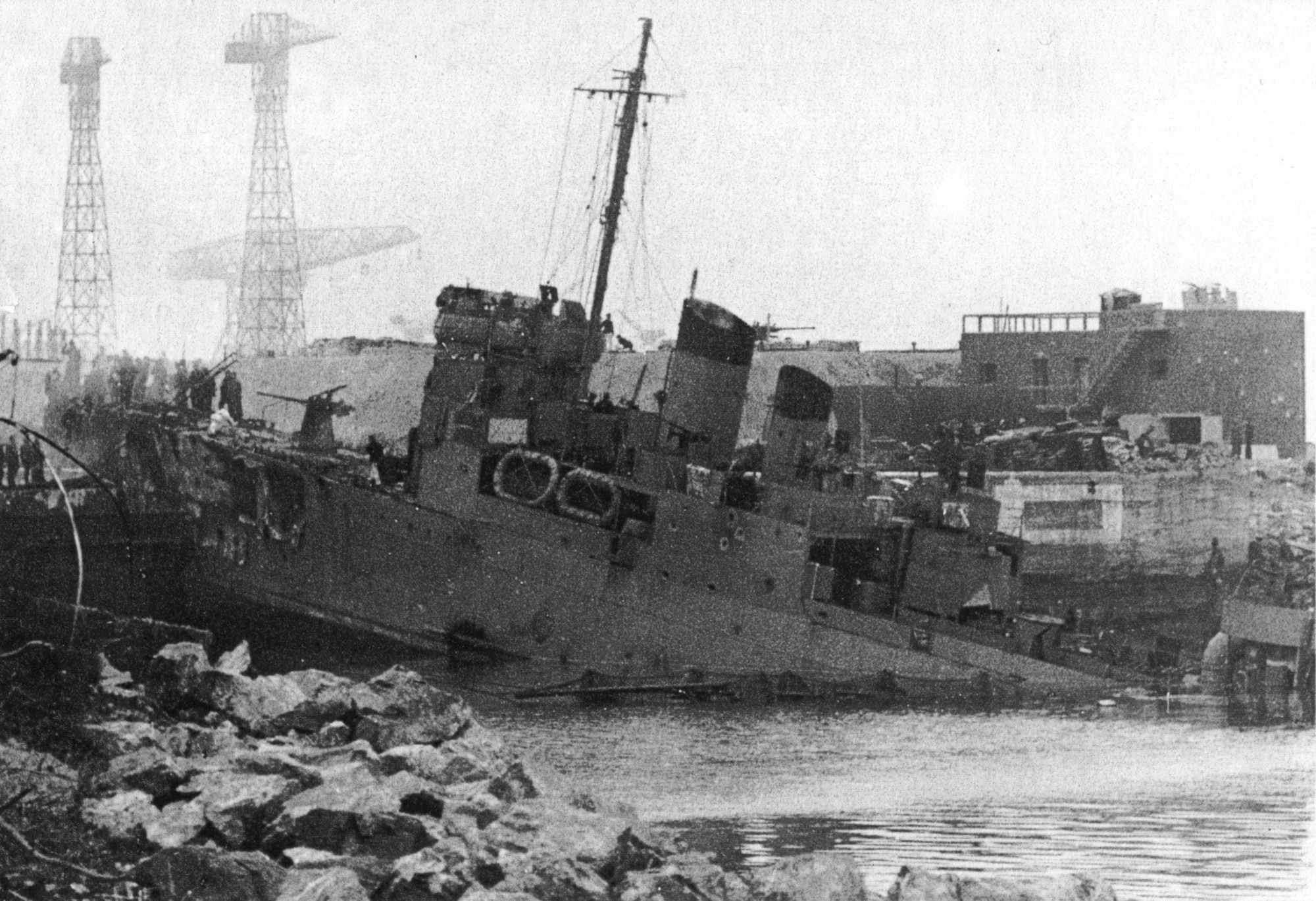
German personnel on-board Campbeltown on the morning after the raid, before the ship exploded

In 1942, the German battleship Tirpitz anchored at Trondheim in Norway was considered to present a grave threat to Atlantic convoys. However, should the ship enter the Atlantic then the dry dock originally built for the ocean liner SS Normandie in the German-occupied port of Saint-Nazaire, France, was the only one in German hands on the Atlantic seaboard large enough to hold her. It was considered that if this dock could be put out of action, then a sortie by Tirpitz into the Atlantic would be much more dangerous for her, and probably not worth the risk. The obsolete Campbeltown was selected for the task, and cosmetic modifications quickly done to make her look similar to a German Möwe-class torpedo boat.

Using genuine German recognition signals, the force approached to within less than a mile of the harbour before they were fired upon, Campbeltown as the largest target drawing most of the fire. At 01:34 on 28 March 1942, Campbeltown rammed the dock gate four minutes later than planned. Troops and crew came ashore under heavy German fire and set about demolishing the dock machinery. 169 of the raiders were killed (64 commandos and 105 sailors) out of the 611 men in the attacking force. Of the survivors, 215 were captured and 222 were evacuated by the surviving small craft. A further five evaded capture and travelled overland through France to Spain and then to Gibraltar.

The charges in Campbeltown exploded the next day, 28 March, an hour and a half after the latest time that the British had expected them to detonate. Although the ship had been searched by the Germans, the explosives had not been detected. The explosion killed around 250 German soldiers and French civilians and demolished both the front half of the ship and the 160-ton caisson, the inrush of water into the dock washing the remains of the ship into it. The dock was rendered unusable for the rest of the war, and was not repaired until 1948.

== Ship's bell ==
The bell was given to Campbelltown, Pennsylvania as a gesture of appreciation towards the United States for the Lend-Lease programme. It was lent by the town to the current HMS Campbeltown, a Type 22 frigate, when it was commissioned in 1989, and remained on the ship whilst it was in service with the Royal Navy. The bell was returned to the town on 21 June 2011 when HMS Campbeltown was decommissioned.

== Films ==
The 1952 film Gift Horse and the 1968 film Attack on the Iron Coast were both loosely based on the story of HMS Campbeltown.
