= Theodore E. Chandler =

United States Navy admiral (1894–1945)

Theodore Edson Chandler
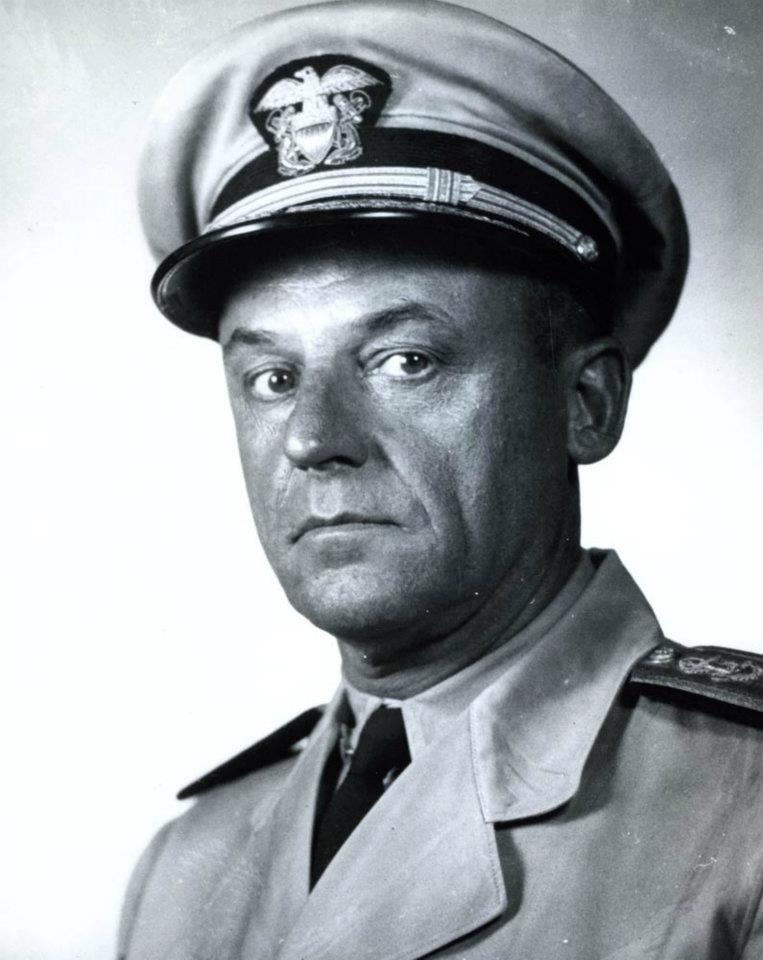
- Born: December 26, 1894; Annapolis, Maryland, US
- Died: January 7, 1945 (aged 50); KIA in the Pacific theatre
- Burial place: Buried at sea; Memorial cenotaph at Arlington National Cemetery, Arlington, Virginia, Section E, Site 201; Tablets of the Missing at Manila American Cemetery and Memorial, Manila, Philippines
- Alma mater: United States Naval Academy
- Spouse: Beatrice Bowen Fairfax Chandler
- Children: Theodora Edson Chandler
- Relatives: Lloyd H. Chandler (father); William E. Chandler (grandfather)
- Military career
- Allegiance: United States
- Branch: United States Navy
- Service years: 1915–1945
- Rank: Rear admiral
- Commands: Pope (DD-225); Buchanan (DD-131); Omaha (CL-4); Cruiser Division 2; Battleship Division 2; Cruiser Division 4
- Conflicts: World War I; World War II; Battle of the Atlantic; Operation Dragoon; Battle of the Philippine Sea; Battle of Leyte Gulf; Invasion of Lingayen Gulf †
- Awards: Army Distinguished Service Medal; Navy Cross (posthumous); Silver Star (posthumous); Legion of Merit (2); Purple Heart; Grand Officier in the Order of Orange-Nassau with swords (Netherlands) (9 March, 1944)

Theodore Edson Chandler (December 26, 1894 – January 7, 1945) was a rear admiral of the United States Navy during World War II, who commanded battleship and cruiser divisions in both the Atlantic and Pacific Fleets. He was killed in action when a Japanese kamikaze aircraft struck his flagship Louisville on January 6, 1945, in Lingayen Gulf, Philippine Islands. He died the next day, January 7, 1945, from severely scorched lungs. He was the last of five US Navy admirals killed in battle during WWII, including: Isaac C. Kidd (1941, Attack on Pearl Harbor); Norman Scott and Daniel J. Callaghan (same day, 1942, Naval Battle of Guadalcanal); and Henry M. Mullinnix (1943, Battle of Makin).

== Early life and education ==
Theodore Edson Chandler was born at Annapolis, Maryland, in 1894, on the day after Christmas, the son of Rear Admiral Lloyd Horwitz Chandler, USN, and Agatha Edson Chandler. His paternal grandfather was William E. Chandler (1835–1917), who served as Secretary of the Navy during the Chester A. Arthur administration and a U.S. Senator from New Hampshire.

Chandler attended Manlius School for Boys and Swavely's Army and Navy Preparatory School before his appointment to the United States Naval Academy for the Second District of New Hampshire in 1911. As a midshipman, he earned letters in basketball and lacrosse. He graduated and was commissioned an Ensign on 4 June 1915.

== Early naval career ==
Chandler's first duty station as a newly commissioned officer was the battleship Florida. He next served briefly on board the battleship New Hampshire before beginning training in the use of torpedoes at the end of April 1917, on board Montana. On August 2, he completed that assignment and four days later joined the precommissioning complement of the destroyer Conner, which was being fitted out at the Philadelphia Navy Yard.

== World War I and interwar years ==
In May 1918, Lieutenant junior grade Chandler sailed in Conner to Brest, France, his destroyer's base during the last six months of World War I. After the Armistice, his service in European waters included a brief term as the temporary commanding officer of Conner.

Chandler returned home in April 1919. On April 28, 1919, he married Beatrice Bowen Fairfax in Washington, D.C. In May, 1919, he reported to the shipyard of the William Cramp & Sons Shipbuilding Co. to help outfit the destroyer Chandler, named in honor of his late grandfather, former Secretary of the Navy William E. Chandler. After her commissioning in September, he served in that ship until December 1920, when he was detached to return to the United States.

On January 2, 1921, he reported for duty at the Naval Postgraduate School at Annapolis, Maryland, and began a 29-month series of ordnance-related studies. On December 26, 1922, Theodora Edson Chandler was born. She was the only child born to Theodore and Beatrice Chandler. On June 1, 1923, he completed training duty and, after a brief leave of absence, reported to Newport News, Virginia, on July 4 for duty in conjunction with the outfitting of the battleship West Virginia. The battleship went into commission on 1 December, and Chandler served in her until 16 January 1925 when he transferred to the battleship Colorado.

In June 1926, newly promoted Lieutenant Commander Chandler went ashore once more for a two-year assignment at the Naval Mine Depot, Yorktown, Virginia. A nine-month tour of duty as gunnery officer in the light cruiser Trenton followed. He reported on board the auxiliary vessel General Alava on April 24, 1929, but was detached only two days later to assume command of the destroyer Pope. In October 1930, he began another series of shore assignments, reporting initially to the Bureau of Ordnance and then to the Army Industrial College before rounding out duty ashore with a brief tour in the office of the Chief of Naval Operations.

On May 30, 1932, Chandler resumed sea duty as gunnery officer on the staff of the Commander Destroyers Battle Force. On February 2, 1934, he assumed command of the destroyer Buchanan. Between August 1935 and June 1938, he served three successive tours as assistant naval attaché: first at Paris, then at Madrid, and finally at Lisbon.

He arrived in Camden, New Jersey, in June 1938 to help fit out the light cruiser Nashville; and he served as her executive officer until July 1940. Next, he returned to Washington, D.C. for a 15-month assignment in the office of the Chief of Naval Operations. Near the end of that tour of duty, he was promoted to captain on July 18, 1941.

== World War II ==
=== Atlantic campaigns ===
Chandler relieved Captain P. P. Powell as commanding officer of the light cruiser Omaha on October 15. Shortly over three weeks later, an event occurred that highlighted Chandler's tour in command of the light cruiser.

On the morning of November 6, 1941, Omaha, in company with the destroyer Somers, came across a darkened ship that acted suspiciously when challenged. That ship—although bearing the name Willmoto and purportedly operating out of Philadelphia—proved to be the German blockade runner Odenwald, bound for Germany with 3,857 metric tons of raw rubber in her holds. Scuttled by her crew, the German ship began to sink, but Captain Chandler sent a party onto the German vessel that controlled the flooding and salvaged the ship. This was the last occasion on which American sailors received prize money.

For most of the next 18 months, Omaha cruised the waters of the South Atlantic in search of German blockade runners and submarines. That tour of duty ended in April 1943, when Chandler was selected to command United States naval forces in the Aruba-Curaçao area. On May 3, 1944, he was promoted to rear admiral. In July 1944, Rear Admiral Chandler took command of Cruiser Division 2 (CruDiv 2), Atlantic Fleet. In that capacity, he participated in Operation Dragoon, the invasion of southern France in mid-August, and commanded the "Sitka-Romeo" force which captured the Iles d'Hyeres just off the coast of Provence.

=== Pacific campaigns ===
Shortly thereafter, Chandler was given command of Battleship Division 2 (BatDiv 2) of the Pacific Fleet, comprising USS Tennessee, USS California, and USS Pennsylvania.

He reported for duty on October 2 in time to command his ships—part of Rear Admiral Jesse B. Oldendorf's bombardment group—during the Leyte invasion and helped to repulse the Japanese southern attack group—Vice Admirals Shoji Nishimura's Force "C" and Kiyohide Shima's 2d Striking Force—in the Surigao Strait phase of the Battle for Leyte Gulf.

On December 8, 1944, Rear Admiral Chandler was shifted to command of CruDiv 4 and flew his flag above USS Louisville. During the voyage from Leyte to Lingayen for the invasion of Luzon, Chandler's cruisers came under heavy Japanese air attacks—mostly by kamikazes.

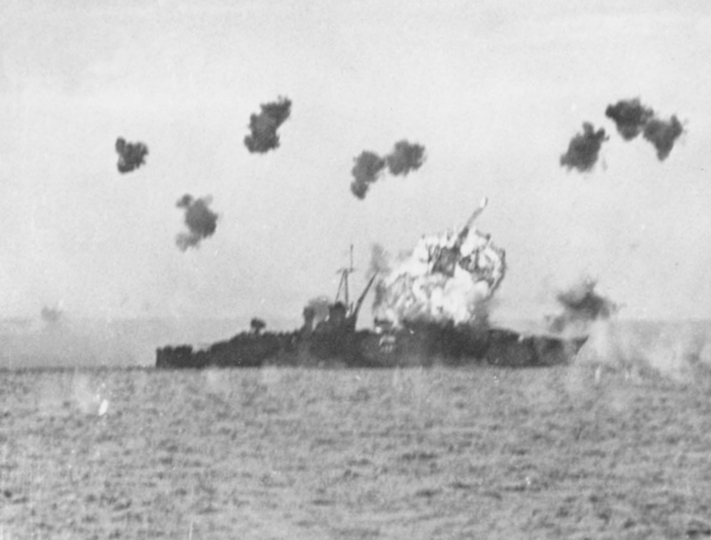
USS Louisville attacked 6 January 1945

Late in the afternoon of January 5, 1945, a group of sixteen kamikazes swooped in on the force, then about 100 miles (200 km) from Manila Bay. One of the four successful kamikazes crashed into Rear Admiral Chandler's flagship USS Louisville at her number No. 2 main battery 8-inch 55 caliber gun, putting it out of commission, but she continued her bombarding mission and downed several planes. On January 6, 1945, the cruiser suffered more severely during a second attack. At 17:30, another kamikaze plunged into the cruiser's starboard side at the signal bridge, where explosives wrought havoc. Rear Admiral Chandler jumped from the bridge to the signal bridge. Though horribly burned by gasoline flames, Chandler helped deploy fire hoses alongside enlisted men to stop the flames and then waited his turn for first aid with those same ratings. The admiral, his lungs scorched very severely, was beyond help. He died the next day, January 7, 1945, in spite of the efforts of the medical department.

Chandler was posthumously awarded a Navy Cross (for Lingayen Gulf), a Silver Star (for Surigao Strait) and an Army Distinguished Service Medal (from General Douglas MacArthur) Admiral Chandler was buried at sea, and is listed on the Tablets of the Missing at the Manila Philippines National Cemetery.

== Awards ==
Chandler's medals and awards include the Army Distinguished Service Medal, the Navy Cross (posthumous), Silver Star Medal (posthumous), Legion of Merit with Gold Star, the Commendation Ribbon, the Victory Medal, Destroyer Clasp; the Yangtze Service Medal; the American Defense Service Medal with bronze "A;" the American campaign Medal; the European-African-Middle Eastern Campaign Medal; the Asiatic-Pacific Campaign Medal; the World War II Victory Medal. He had also been awarded the Orden Nacional de Cruzeriro de Sul (grade of official) and diploma by the Government of Brazil, and the Legion of Honor (Officer) and diploma by the Government of France; and the Order of Orange-Nassau with Swords (rank of Grand Officer) had been conferred upon him by Queen Wilholnina of The Netherlands.

=== Navy Cross citation ===
Chandler was awarded the Navy Cross for his actions on January 6, 1945 in the Lingayen Gulf, Philippine Islands, which lead to his death the following day. His Navy Cross citation reads:

For extraordinary heroism as Commander, Cruiser Division FOUR, in action against enemy Japanese forces in Lingayen Gulf, Philippine Islands, on January 6, 1945. Skillfully coordinating the fire of his division with that of other heavy naval units during the initial bombardment of Luzon prior to scheduled landing operations at Lingayen, Rear Admiral Chandler ordered the smashing broadsides of his powerful guns with unrelenting aggressiveness despite a heavy overcast which reduced visibility and while under persistent attack by enemy aircraft. Observing the progress of operations from an exposed position on the flag bridge when a Japanese suicide bomber attacked and hit his cruiser, setting the flag bridge afire, he emerged from the raging inferno with his clothing ablaze, Determined to remain in action, he steadfastly continued to direct his units until compelled by his Chief of Staff to proceed to the dressing station for treatment of severe burns. Stout-hearted and indomitable in the face of almost certain death, Rear Admiral Chandler succumbed to his injuries the following day. By his inspiring devotion to duty and heroic spirit of self-sacrifice throughout, he enhanced and sustained the highest traditions of the United States Naval service. He gallantly gave his life in defense of his ship.

=== Silver Star citation ===
The Silver Star was awarded for to Chandler for his actions on October 25, 1944 in the Battle of Surigao Strait. His Silver Star citation reads:

For conspicuous gallantry and intrepidity as Commander of a Battleship Division in action against major units of the enemy Japanese fleet during the Battle of Surigao Strait in the early hours of October 25, 1944. When a formidable column of Japanese warships entered the narrow confines of the Strait and advanced under cover of darkness toward our waiting forces, Rear Admiral Chandler, with his division placed among other battleships in the strategic T-formation across the northern end of Surigao, hurled the full power of his heavy guns at the confused enemy force. Directing the shattering broadsides of his mighty vessels with unrelenting fury, he waged fierce battle against the enemy in a prolonged engagement which resulted in the destruction of two Japanese battleships and three destroyers before effective return fire could be brought to bear on our ships. Subsequently retiring his division unscathed from the action, Rear Admiral Chandler, by his brilliant leadership, outstanding professional skill and indomitable fighting spirit in the face of tremendous odds, contributed materially to the defeat of the enemy in this decisive action...

== Namesakes ==
Two ships in the U.S. Navy have been named after Chandler: the destroyer Theodore E. Chandler (DD-717) in October 1945, and the Kidd-class guided missile destroyer Chandler (DDG-996) in 1983.
