= William E. Chandler =

American politician (1835–1917)

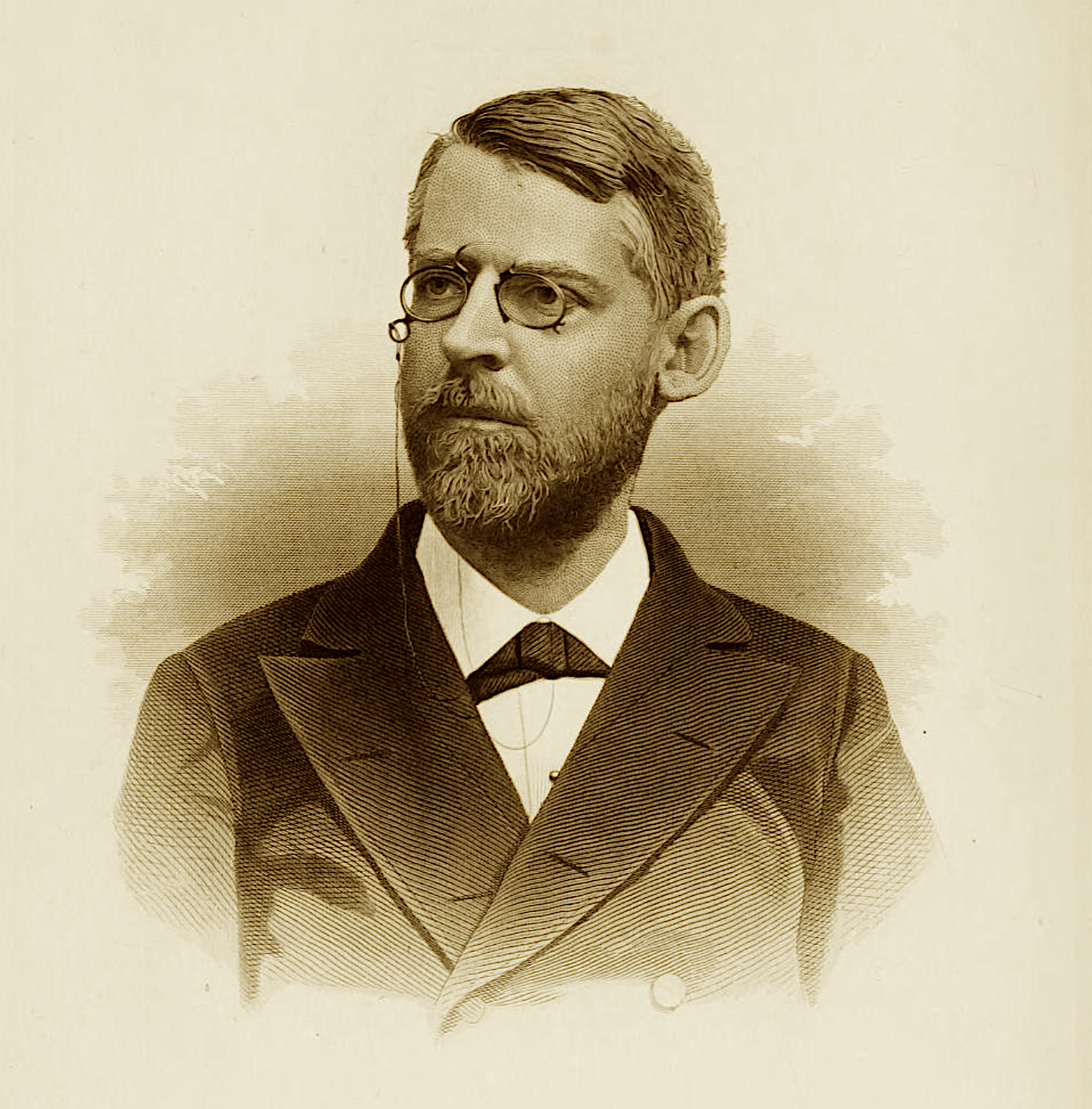
- Chandler c. 1891–1894

United States Senator from New Hampshire
- In office June 14, 1887 – March 3, 1889
- Preceded by: Person Cheney
- Succeeded by: Gilman Marston
- In office June 18, 1889 – March 3, 1901
- Preceded by: Gilman Marston
- Succeeded by: Henry E. Burnham

30th United States Secretary of the Navy
- In office April 16, 1882 – March 4, 1885
- President: Chester A. Arthur
- Preceded by: William H. Hunt
- Succeeded by: William Whitney

Speaker of the New Hampshire House of Representatives
- In office 1863–1865

Member of the New Hampshire House of Representatives
- In office 1862–1865

Personal details
- Born: William Eaton Chandler; December 28, 1835 Concord, New Hampshire, U.S.
- Died: November 30, 1917 (aged 81) Concord, New Hampshire, U.S.
- Party: Republican
- Spouse(s): Ann Gilmore (m. 1859; died 1871) Lucy Lambert Hale (m. 1874; died 1915)
- Children: Lloyd H. Chandler
- Education: Harvard University (LLB)

William Eaton Chandler (December 28, 1835 – November 30, 1917), also known as Bill Chandler, was a lawyer who served as United States Secretary of the Navy and as a U.S. Senator from New Hampshire. In the 1880s, he was a member of the Republican "Half-Breed" faction, the wing of the party which advocated civil service reform. His credentials were established as moderate in comparison to most of the Republican Party, particularly in his opposition towards sound money.

Chandler, who continued to advocate civil rights following the end of Reconstruction, criticized the policies of President Rutherford B. Hayes, whose actions pertaining to the South he viewed as too lenient. Chandler started the U.S. Naval resurgence and the precedent of the U.S. Navy being constructed with modern steel ships.

== Early life ==
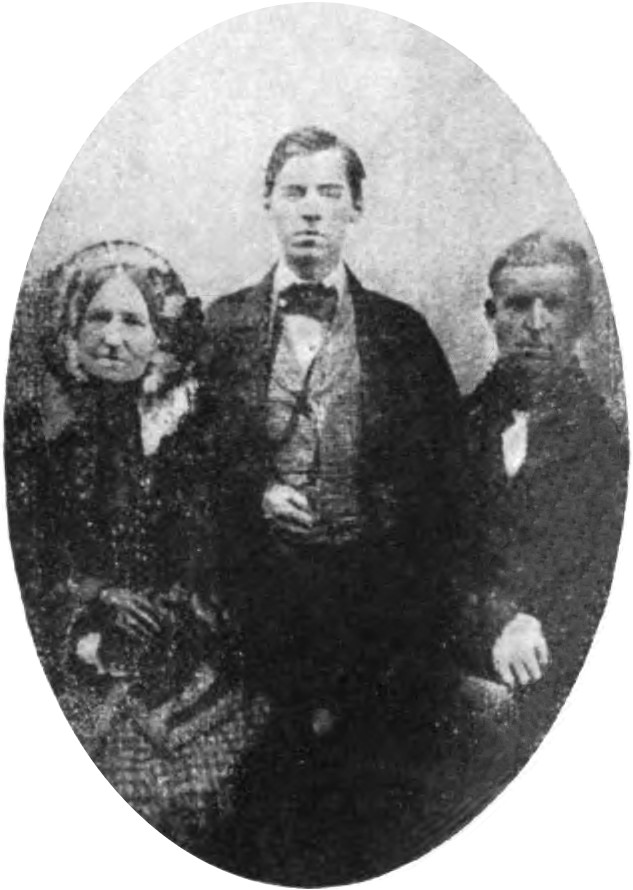
A young William E. Chandler with his parents, Nathan S. Chandler and Mary Chandler

William E. Chandler was born in Concord, New Hampshire, to Nathan S. Chandler and Mary Ann (Tucker) Chandler. William's elder brother, John Chandler, was a successful East India merchant, and his younger brother George Chandler, an attorney who served as a major during the Civil War.

William Chandler attended the common schools, Thetford Academy and Pembroke Academy before attending Harvard Law School, where he began a romantic correspondence with Lucy Lambert Hale, daughter of Senator John Parker Hale. He graduated in 1854, was admitted to the bar in 1855, and commenced practice in Concord.

In 1859, Chandler married Ann Gilmore, the daughter of New Hampshire Governor Joseph A. Gilmore. They had one son, Lloyd H. Chandler, who served in the U.S. Navy during World War I, and retired as a rear admiral. Ann died in 1871.

In 1874, Chandler resumed his romance with Lucy Hale, who had been secretly betrothed in 1865 to John Wilkes Booth, Abraham Lincoln's assassin. Chandler and Hale were married in 1874, and in March 1875, their only son, John Parker Hall Chandler, was born. Lucy died in 1915.

== Political career ==
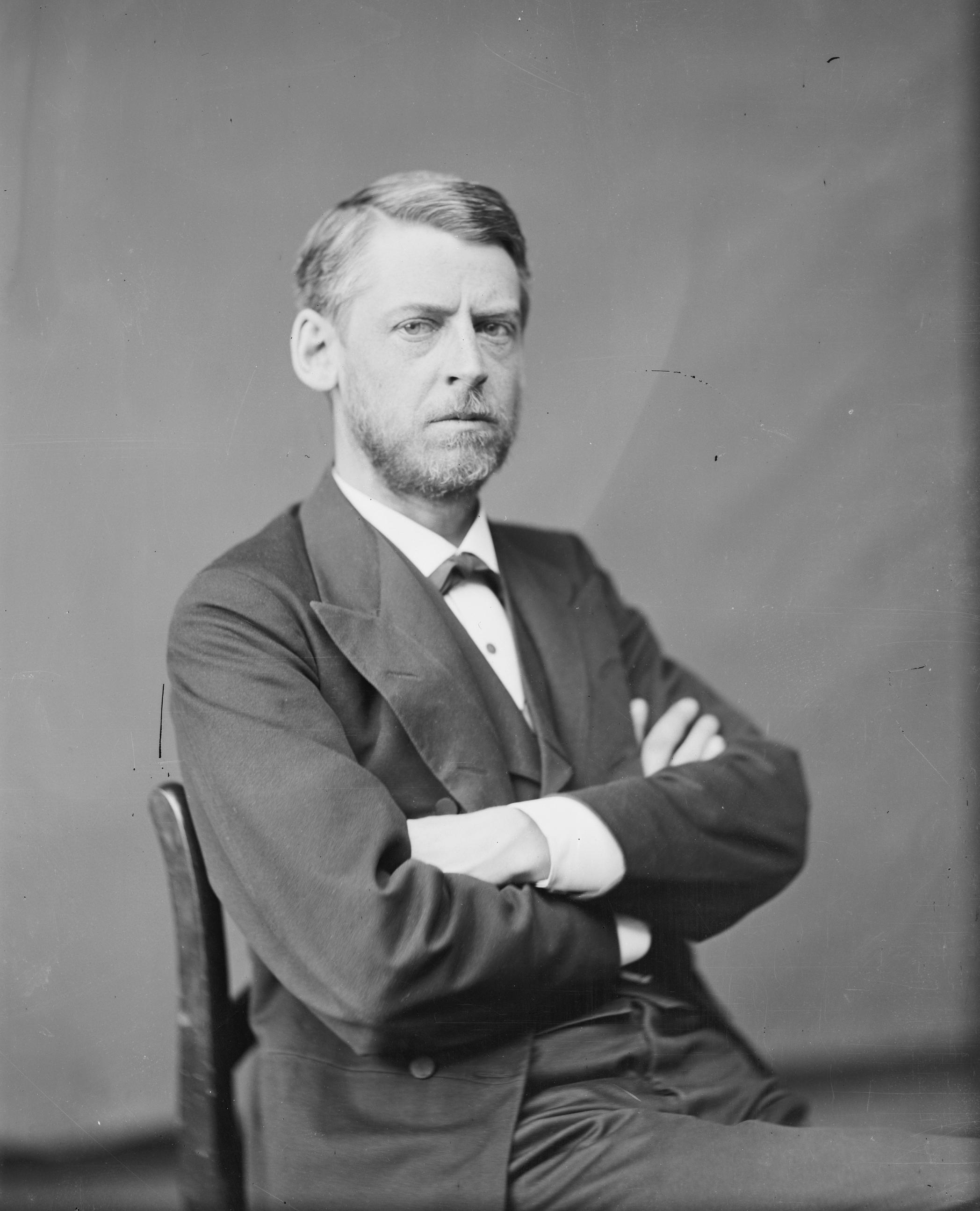
Photographic portrait of Chandler, taken circa 1865–1880 by the Brady-Handy studio

In 1859, Chandler was appointed reporter of the decisions of the Supreme Court of New Hampshire. He then served in the New Hampshire House of Representatives from 1862 to 1865 and was the Speaker during the last two years.

=== Civil War and Reconstruction ===
In 1865, Chandler was appointed by President Abraham Lincoln as the Navy Department's Solicitor General and Judge Advocate General. Subsequently, he was appointed First Assistant Secretary of the Treasury, until he resigned in 1867. During Chandler's tenure as First Assistant, referendums for black suffrage in most states failed, and he explained to a Radical Republican that President Andrew Johnson believed the Republicans:

...could not carry [black suffrage] as a national issue; and the result in Connecticut proves he is right.

Like most Republicans, Chandler advocated suffrage for blacks. However, he broke from the party's loyalists in his opposition to the perceived influence of trusts and railroad interests. Chandler also opposed the gold standard. Among intraparty disputes on civil rights between the Radical and "Conservative" factions, Chandler stated:

I notice, that everyone who goes South, whether Radical or Conservative, comes back confirmed in his previous opinion.

During Reconstruction, Chandler expressed pessimism about Republican efforts to safeguard Southern blacks from Democratic terrorism, viewing a demise of military protection as inevitable. As chairman of the Republican National Committee, he wrote:

This southern business must have its run. We are bound to be overwhelmed by the new rebel combinations in every southern state.

On April 2, 1868, Chandler testified in the impeachment trial of President Andrew Johnson, having been called as a witness by the prosecution.

Amidst controversies that ensued in the wake of the 1876 United States presidential election, Chandler aided Republican efforts to ensure an ultimate victory for Rutherford B. Hayes over Samuel J. Tilden. In the state of Florida, the Tallahassee canvassing board tossed out 1,500 Democratic votes under the urging of Chandler, who believed the results tainted by Democratic election fraud and voter suppression, to "manufacture a Hayes victory."

Chandler returned to New Hampshire and became a newspaper publisher and editor during the 1870s and 1880s. Continuing in politics, he was a member of the State constitutional convention in 1876 and a member of the State house of representatives in 1881.

=== Secretary of Navy ===
Chandler, a Half-Breed and ally of James G. Blaine, was appointed by President Chester A. Arthur as Secretary of the Navy in 1882. He took charge in 1883 in planning for the rescue of Lt. Adolphus Greely's Lady Franklin Bay Expedition. Chandler served until 1885. Chandler also began U.S. naval resurgence modernizing the navy with the production of steel ships.

==== U.S. Naval resurgence ====
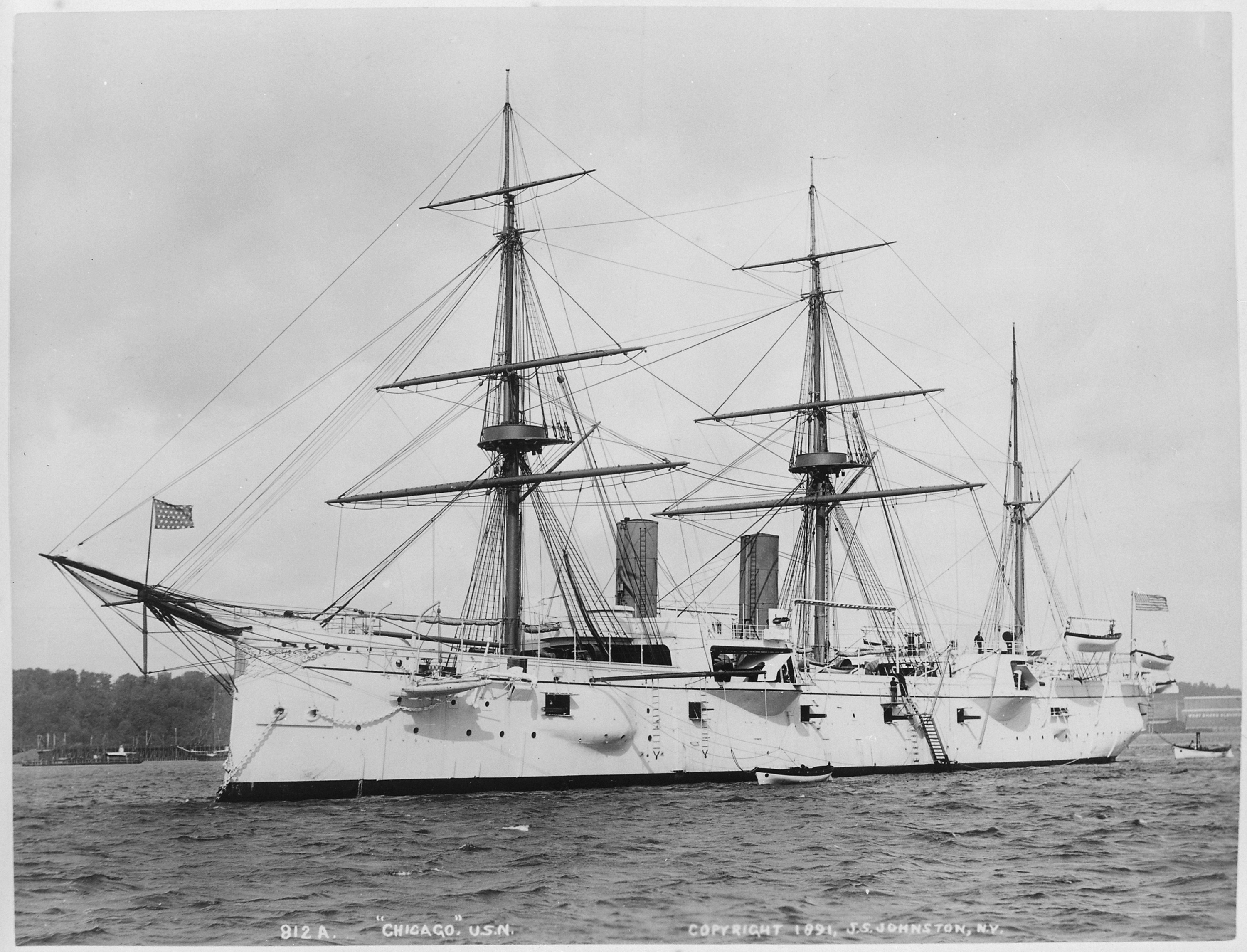
USS Chicago

Chandler took office during the momentous turning point of the U.S. Navy. Both President Arthur, in his 1881 annual address, and Chandler, in his 1882 annual report, believed that the U.S. Navy, as a premier fighting force, was extinct. In fact, the U.S. Navy's top warship was the USS Tennessee, a wooden vessel that weighed 4,840 tons. The U.S. had refrained from modernizing its navy, as other nations had done. By contrast, the British Navy had laid down the first all-steel warship, HMS Iris, in 1875.

On August 5, 1882, during Chandler's first year of office, Congress authorized the building of two modern steel cruizers. On March 3, 1883, Congress authorized the funding for these vessels and for two more steel vessels. Under Chandler's direction plans were drawn up and keels laid for the USS Chicago, USS Boston, USS Atlanta, and the despatch ship USS Dolphin, collectively known as the ABCDs. The warships were to be constructed by the John Roach Company. The new ships and their armament were to be built in the United States at a pace that American resources could supply, rather than be built by a foreign country. However, several years elapsed before shipyards and foundries would be ready to construct cruizers and battleships. One ship, the USS Chicago, was still built with antiquated boilers over brick furnaces and furnished with sailing equipment, in addition to steam power. Although Chandler was charged with favoritism in the construction of the USS Dolphin, he established the precedent for a modern navy made of steel ships.

==== Greely polar expedition rescue (1884) ====
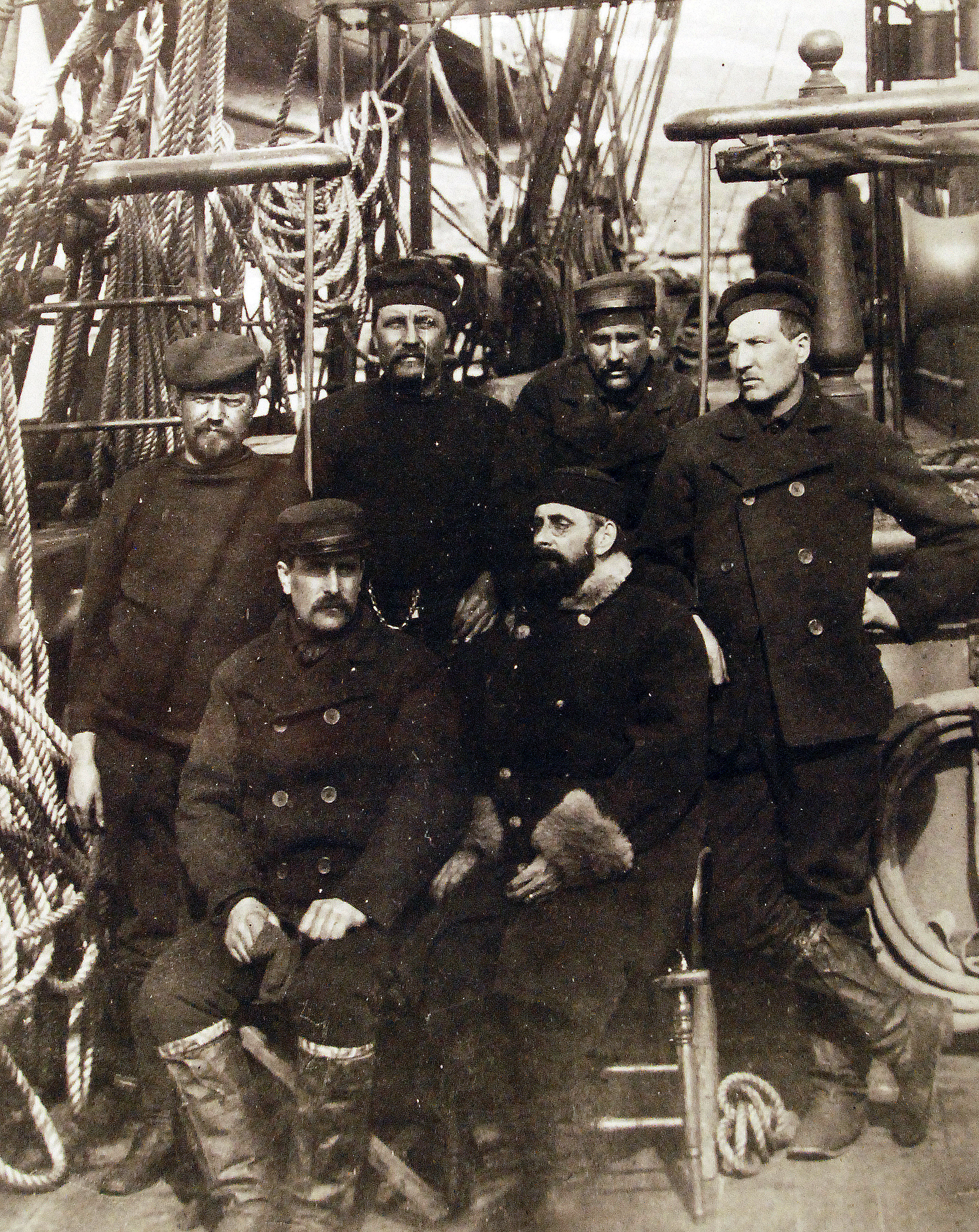
Six Greely polar expedition survivors. The honor of the U.S. Navy saved.

By 1883, the ill-fated crew of the U.S. Army 1881 Greely scientific polar expedition was stranded at Fort Conger on Lady Franklin Bay. On July 7, 1881, the Greely crew had left New Foundland, headed northward on the private whaling ship the Proteus. In August 1881, the crew arrived at Lady Franklin Bay without incident or blockage from ice flows. However, after the Proteus dropped off the men and ample provisions, the ship immediately departed and left the expedition to fend for themselves. The men built Fort Conger as a place of refuge and scientific study. Two U.S. supply efforts, in 1882 and 1883, to reach the Greely party, ended in dismal failure. The first, on July 8, 1882, led by William Beebe, on the private steamship Neptune, left St. John's, but was trapped by ice and forced to turn around. On June 29, 1883, the second left St. John's, with two ships, the Proteus, commanded by First Lieutenant Ernest Garlington, U.S. 7th Cavalry, and the steam gunboat USS Yantic. The Proteus was crushed by an ice pack, whose stranded crew was rescued by the USS Yantic. Afterward, Garlington abandoned the mission to save Greely and the crew at Fort Conger.

On September 1, 1883, with no relief in sight, Greely and his party left the safety of Fort Conger on small boats, over rough ice-capped waters, and made a permanent base, Camp Clay, at Cape Sabine, on Pim Island, off the eastern shores of the Johan Peninsula, Ellesmere Island, where rations had been placed by the British a few years earlier. However, an attempt by two of Greely's men failed to retrieve the vital food cache over a long distance. Without food or game, the men began to slowly starve to death. On December 17, 1883, President Arthur established a joint Army-Navy commission to make recommendations to Secretary of War Lincoln and Secretary of Navy Chandler on how to rescue the Greely party. Secretary Lincoln had no interest in participating in the Greely rescue. Chandler, however, was determined to accomplish a successful rescue of Greely and to restore the honor of the U.S. Navy. Chandler assigned Commander Winfield Schley to command the 1884 Greely Relief Mission. Chandler spared no expense in the rescue effort and had purchased one of the finest sealers afloat, the USS Bear, from Scottish owner Walter Grieve, for $100,000. This was done without authority, prior to the passage of the Greely relief bill.

Chandler vigorously demanded that all of his subordinates in the Naval Department be committed to the relief of the Greely expedition and he drew support from Navy officers. On July 17, 1884, after rescuing the Greely party, Schley arrived at Saint John's, New Foundland and telegraphed to Chandler that the rescue operation was successful. Of the seven rescued, Joseph Elison died on July 8 following multiple amputations. Evidence suggested that the men had survived through cannibalism, which they denied.

=== U.S. Senator (New Hampshire) ===
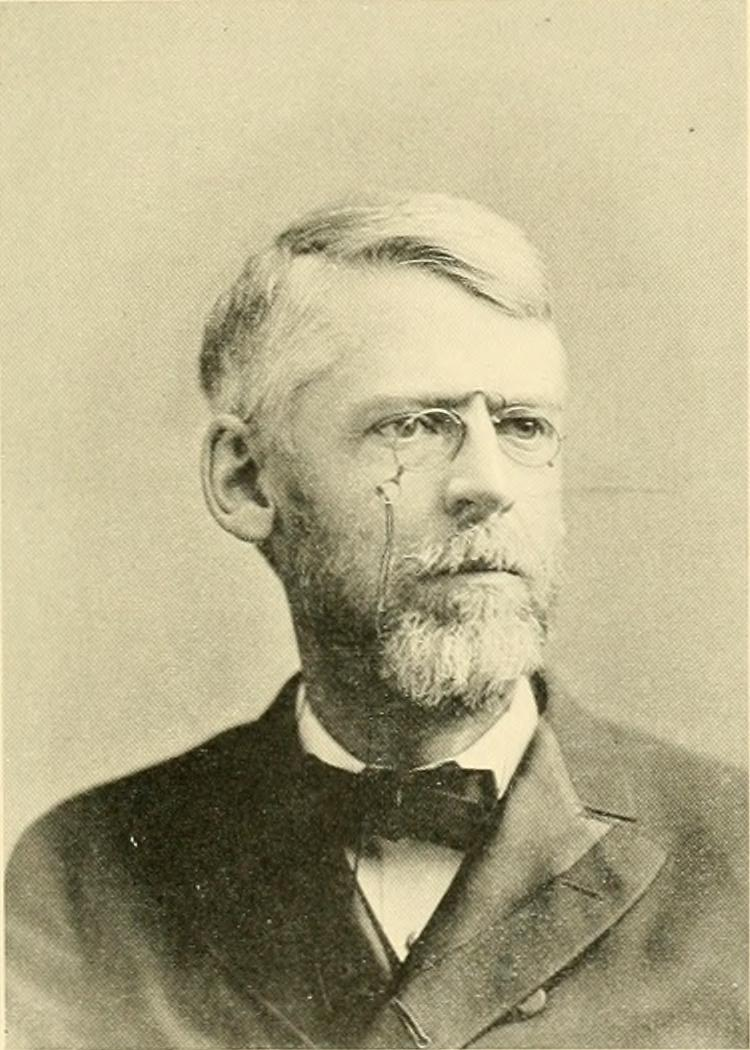
U.S. Senator William E. Chandler 1898

As a Republican, he was elected to the United States Senate to fill the vacancy caused by the death of Austin F. Pike and served from June 14, 1887, to March 3, 1889. Subsequently, elected for the term beginning March 4, 1889, he was reelected in 1895 and served from June 18, 1889, to March 3, 1901. He was an unsuccessful candidate for renomination. He served as chairman of the Committee on Immigration (Fifty-first and Fifty-second Congresses), Committee on Census (Fifty-fourth Congress), and Committee on Privileges and Elections (Fifty-fifth and Fifty-sixth Congresses).

In 1892, Chandler proposed a one-year ban on immigration, to keep out "undesirables," which included cholera carriers, Anarchists, nihilists, polygamists, Mafia members, illiterates, "blind or crippled" persons, "persons without means," etc. Among the solutions Chandler proposed for addressing the "evils which have been made apparent by the vast increase, within recent years, of degraded immigrants from Italy, Turkey, Hungary, Poland and Russia proper" were the addition of an educational requirement and property qualification for all persons or families seeking to emigrate to the United States. The strongest opponents of the bill were the steamship companies, who stood to lose a major portion of their business. A watered-down version of The Chandler Immigration and Contract Labor Bill became law on March 3, 1893. It simply required steamship companies to prepare lists of their passengers containing full information, and thus very likely served as a compromise to get the steamship companies to back down on Immigration Reform at this time.

In 1900, he was one of only two Republicans and the only Senator from the Northeast to vote against the Gold Standard Act, though he emphasized that he did not oppose the gold standard itself.

=== Later (20th Century) ===
Chandler was appointed by President William McKinley to the Spanish Treaty Claims Commission in 1901. He was the president of the Commission from its inception until 1907 when its work was nearly complete.

In 1907, Chandler served as the lead counsel during the Next Friends Suit, a legal challenge over the estate of Mary Baker Eddy, the leader of the Christian Science church. The trial was headline news across the country. He would lose the case.

Leaving public office, Chandler resumed the practice of law in Concord and Washington, D.C.

== Death and burial ==
He died at Concord in 1917 and was buried in Blossom Hill Cemetery in Concord.

== Legacy ==
USS Chandler (DD-206) was named for him.

Chandler's grandson Theodore E. Chandler joined the U.S. Navy in 1911 while his grandparents were both still alive, and later distinguished himself as a rear admiral in World War II. While aboard the cruiser USS Louisville, he was killed in action by a Japanese kamikaze aircraft during the Battle of Lingayen Gulf in January 1945.

== Sources ==
=== Book ===
- Foner, Eric (1988). Reconstruction: America's Unfinished Revolution, 1863–1877. New York: Harper & Row.
- Paxson, Frederic Logan (1943). Allen Johnson (ed.). Dictionary of American Biography Chandler, William Eaton. Vol. 3. New York: C. Scribner's Sons. pp. 616–618.

=== Magazine ===
- Jampoler, Andrew C.A. (August 2010). "Disaster at Lady Franklin Bay". Naval History Magazine. Vol. 24, no. 4. U.S. Naval Institute.
- Todd, A. L. (June 1960). "Ordeal In The Arctic". American Heritage. Vol. 11, no. 4.

Government offices
Preceded by William H. Hunt	United States Secretary of the Navy; 1882–1885	Succeeded by William C. Whitney
U.S. Senate
Preceded by Person C. Cheney	U.S. senator (Class 2) from New Hampshire; 1887–1889; Served alongside: Henry W. Blair	Succeeded by Gilman Marston
Preceded by Gilman Marston	U.S. senator (Class 2) from New Hampshire; 1889–1901; Served alongside: Henry W. Blair, Jacob H. Gallinger	Succeeded by Henry E. Burnham
Political offices
Preceded by Edward A. Rollins	Speaker of the New Hampshire House of Representatives; 1863–1864	Succeeded by Austin F. Pike
