= USS Navasota =

Oiler of the United States Navy

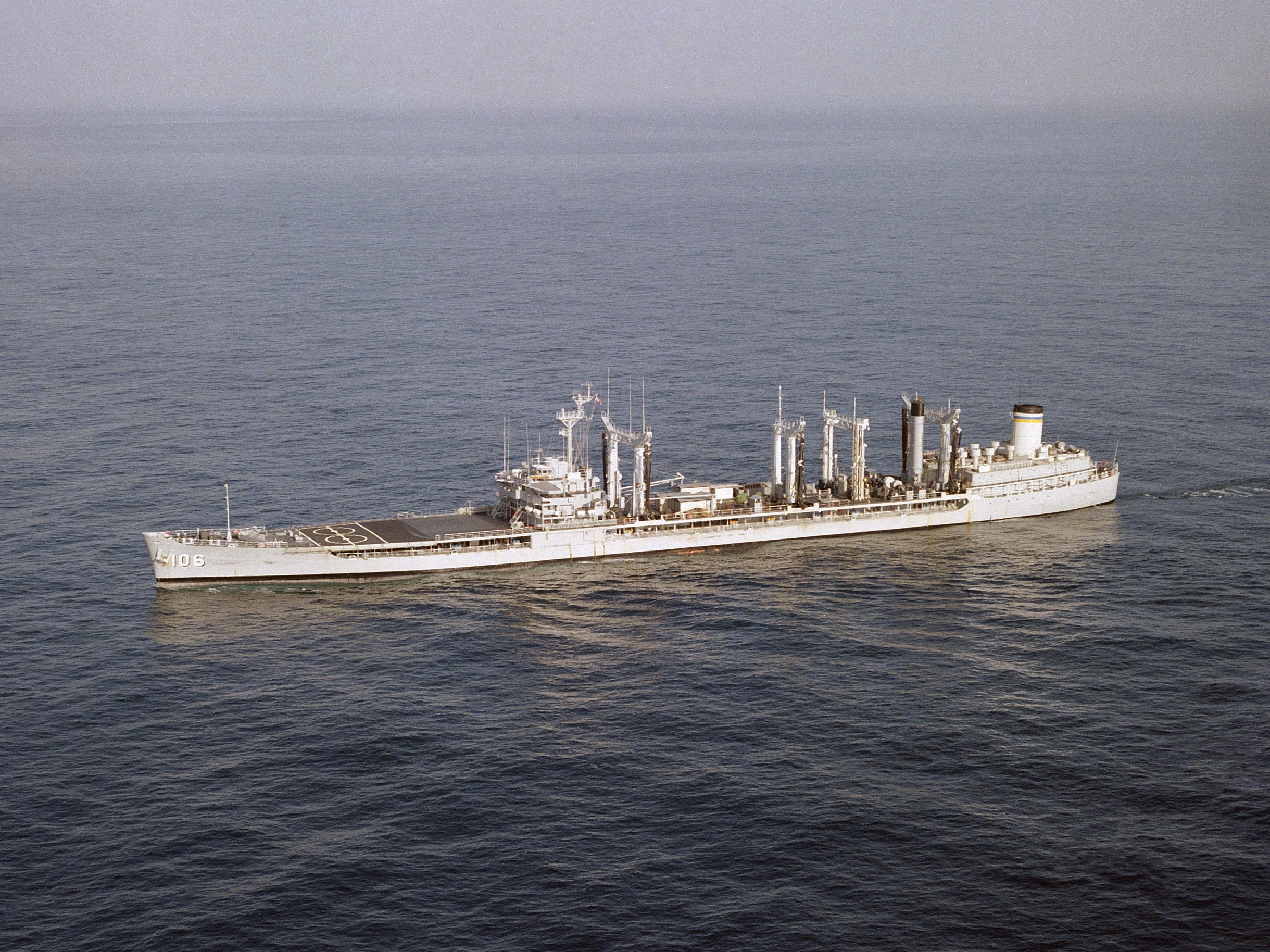
- USNS Navasota (T-AO-106) in 1986

History

United States
- Name: USS Navasota
- Namesake: The Navasota River in Texas
- Builder: Sun Shipbuilding and Drydock Company, Chester, Pennsylvania
- Laid down: 22 February 1945
- Launched: 30 August 1945
- Commissioned: 27 February 1946
- Decommissioned: 13 August 1975
- In service: 1975
- Out of service: 1991
- Reclassified: T-AO-107 after decommissioning
- Stricken: 2 January 1992
- Identification: IMO number: 7737133
- Honors and awards: Nine battle stars for Korean War service and 14 campaign stars for Vietnam War service
- Fate: Sold for scrapping 25 October 1995

General characteristics
- Class & type: Ashtabula- or Cimarron-class replenishment oiler
- Displacement: As built: 7,423 tons (light); 25,480 tons (full load); After "jumboization": 12,840 tons (light); 33,987 tons (full load)
- Length: As built: 553 ft (169 m); After "jumboization": 644 ft (196 m)
- Beam: 75 ft (23 m)
- Draft: As built: 32 ft (9.8 m); After "jumboization": 34 ft 9 in (10.59 m)
- Installed power: 30,400 hp (22.7 MW)
- Propulsion: geared turbines, four boilers, twin screws
- Speed: 16 knots (29.6 km/h)
- Capacity: 146,000 barrels (23,200 m^{3}) of fuel oil
- Complement: 304 (as USS Navasota)
- Crew: 108 civilians plus a detachment of U.S. Navy personnel (as USNS Navasota)
- Armament: As built: 1 × 5 in (130 mm) 38-caliber gun; 4 × 3 in (76 mm) 50-caliber guns; 8 × 40-mm antiaircraft guns (4 x 2); 8 × 20-mm antiaircraft guns (4 x 2); After May 1958: 4 × 3-inch (76.2-mm) 50-caliber guns
- Notes: "Jumboization" involved the lengthening of Navasota's hull and installation of additional cargo capacity in 1964-1965.

USS Navasota (AO-106) was an Ashtabula-class replenishment oiler that served in the U.S. Navy from 1946 to 1973, then transferred to the Military Sealift Command to continue service as United States Naval Ship USNS Navasota (T-AO-106) until taken out of service in 1992. Navasota was sold for scrapping in 1995. She was the only U.S. Navy ship to bear the name Navasota.

== Construction and commissioning ==
Navasota was laid down under Maritime Commission contract on 22 February 1945 as Maritime Commission hull 2702 by Sun Shipbuilding and Drydock Company, Chester, Pennsylvania. She was launched on 30 August 1945, sponsored by Mrs. A. Hahn, and commissioned on 27 February 1946.

== Operational history, 1946–63 ==
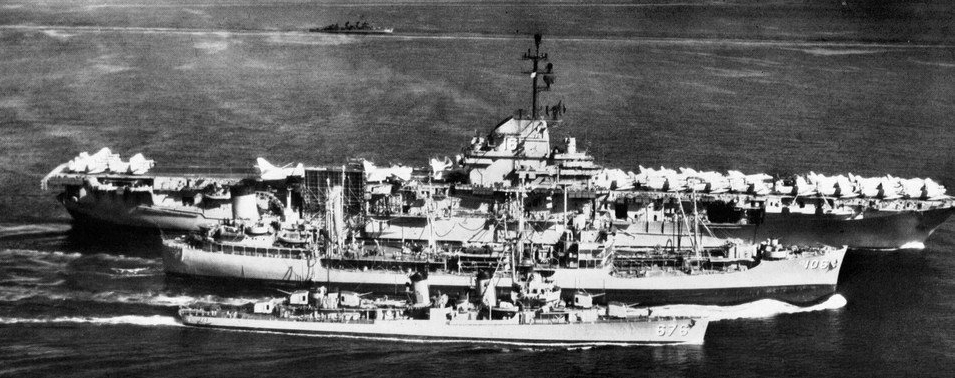
Navasota refueling the aircraft carrier Lexington and destroyer Marshall in the eastern Philippine Sea during the 1958 Taiwan Strait Crisis.

After three months of shakedown and training off the United States East Coast, Navasota steamed via the Panama Canal for Pearl Harbor, Hawaii, and the western Pacific Ocean. Assigned to Service Force, United States Pacific Fleet, she departed Pearl Harbor on 3 July 1946 to bring petroleum products from the Persian Gulf to the Pacific fleet. She stood out of Yokosuka, Japan, on 20 August 1946 for San Pedro, California, arriving on 2 September 1946. For the next four months, the oiler was in an operational training status, and on 30 January 1948, she again deployed to the Western Pacific. After serving as station ship at Qingdao, China, from April through June 1948, she returned to San Pedro, California, on 7 July 1948, thence to Pearl Harbor in August 1948.

Navasota departed Pearl Harbor on 13 October 1948, once again en route the Far East. She departed Yokosuka on 20 November 1948 for Qingdao and remained on station until 30 December 1948, when she sailed for California via Pearl Harbor. She arrived at Long Beach, California, on 19 January 1949, steamed to Kodiak, Alaska on 1 February 1949, returned to San Francisco on 25 February 1949, and continued to operate on the west coast of the United States for the next year.

Navasota again deployed to the Western Pacific on 1 May 1950. When the North Koreans crossed the 38th parallel north on 25 June 1950, beginning the Korean War, the oiler steamed for Korean waters to fuel Allied ships in the area. In late August 1950, she put in at Keelung, Formosa, but she was back in Korean waters to take part in the Inchon invasion on 15 September 1950.

She steamed for Pearl Harbor on 22 October 1950, and then for Japan via Kwajalein and Guam. Departing Japan on 16 December 1950, she arrived at Long Beach on 30 December 1950, only to return to the Far East on 31 March 1951 for further operations off Wonsan, Korea.

During her Korean operations Navasota fueled ships in Subic Bay on Luzon in the Philippine Islands, in Buckner Bay on Okinawa, in the Pescadores Islands, in Formosa, in Japan, and in Korea. She returned to Long Beach for overhaul from October 1951 until February 1952. The oiler operated off the U.S. West Coast until getting underway on 3 April 1952 for Sasebo, Japan, and resumption of her Korean fueling operations. She remained in the area of Wonsan and Songjin, Korea, for the next seven months and then returned to Long Beach, arriving there on 13 November 1952.

Navasota steamed from Long Beach on 2 February 1953 for Pearl Harbor to participate in Mercantile Convoy Exercise RES 53B, after which she called at Sasebo on 26 February 1953 to commence her fourth Pacific deployment. For the next seven months, she conducted fueling operations in Korean waters. She was also used as station ship at Kaohsiung, Formosa, where she fueled units of the Formosa Straits Patrol until she headed for Long Beach on 3 September 1953.

For the next ten years, Navasota continued to provide fueling services to the fleet through her annual Western Pacific deployments. In one overhaul at Long Beach Naval Shipyard from February to May 1958, all guns save her single 3-inch (76.2-mm) mounts were removed.

Highlights in this period included service as a fuel ship during the nuclear weapons tests at Bikini Atoll in the summer of 1956 and her Western Pacific deployment of 1958, when she refueled 174 ships from August through November while serving as station ship at Makung in the Pescadores.

== "Jumboization", 1963–64 ==
Upon completion of her 15th Western Pacific deployment on 14 October 1963, Navasota was scheduled for "jumboization", the first oiler so designated. She steamed on 14 November 1963 for Puget Sound Naval Shipyard at Bremerton, Washington, for preliminary preparations, then entered Puget Sound Bridge and Drydock Company, Plant No. 2, Harbor Island, Seattle, Washington for the conversion. Her new 394-ft (120.1 m) midsection was built in Kawasaki Dock Yard, Kobe, Japan, and towed to Seattle by the Japanese tug Daisho Maru No. 1.

The "jumboization" process consisted of five basic steps. First, the bow was removed and retained in the drydock while the rest of the ship was floated out. Next, the new section was floated in, raised, and joined to the bow. Third, the bridge structure was transferred to the new section by heavy lift crane on 9 January 1964. Then the stern section was severed and retained in drydock while the old midsection was floated out. In the last step, the new section with bow and bridge structure attached, was floated into the dock, raised, and joined to the stern.

Although replacement of the midsection was the single largest change in the $15,000,000 process, many other important improvements were made during the conversion. A major modification was made to the stern, including a new counterbalanced rudder, new stern casting and struts, and new shorter propeller shafts and stern tubes. The latest in fueling and replenishment at sea equipment was also added, including kingposts with outriggers, ram tensioned span wires and high lines, electric hydraulic winches, cargo elevators, helicopter pickup area, and sliding blocks and cargo drop reels at replenishment stations. New electric pumps, larger cargo piping, and double-hose fueling rigs were also added, as well as a 4,500-kilowatt auxiliary diesel generator plant, and more enclosed stowage space. Habitability was also improved.

Her "jumboization" complete, Navasota left the shipyard on 28 December 1964.

== 1965–75 ==
After upkeep and training, Navasota steamed 20 August 1965 on her 16th Western Pacific deployment, arriving at Subic Bay on 11 September 1965 and returning to Long Beach on 6 June 1966.

Navasota again steamed for the Western Pacific on 11 October 1966. Arriving at Subic Bay on 3 November 1966, she operated in the Gulf of Tonkin and in coastal waters off North and South Vietnam in support of United States Seventh Fleet warships conducting operations in the Vietnam War, with Subic Bay as her base of operations. The summer of 1967 brought the oiler back to Long Beach for upkeep and U.S. West Coast operations until she again deployed to the Western Pacific on 5 January 1968 to assume support duties for Seventh Fleet forces off Vietnam. Through at least 1970, she continued to deploy to the Western Pacific for six to eight months of each year, spending the remainder operating out of Long Beach as part of Service Force, Pacific Fleet, in support of United States First Fleet operations and Fleet Training Group, San Diego, California.

Navasota was decommissioned on 13 August 1975 and transferred to the Military Sealift Command, in which she served as USNS Navasota (T-AO-106) until 1991.

== Later career and disposition ==
Navasota began active service with the Military Sealift Command in 1975. She was taken out of service in 1991. Navasota was stricken from the Naval Vessel Register on 2 January 1992. She was sold for scrapping on 25 October 1995.

== Battle honors ==
USS Navasota received nine battle stars for her Korean War service and 14 campaign stars for her Vietnam War service.

== See also ==
- Wildenberg, Thomas (1996). Gray Steel and Black Oil: Fast Tankers and Replenishment at Sea in the U.S. Navy, 1912-1995. Annapolis, Maryland: Naval Institute Press.
