= USS Chandler (DD-206) =

Clemson-class destroyer

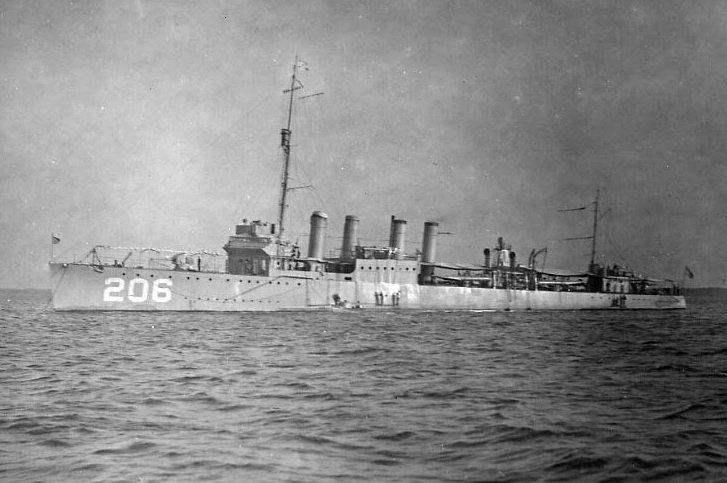
- USS Chandler (DD-206) in 1919

History

United States
- Name: Chandler
- Namesake: William Eaton Chandler
- Builder: William Cramp & Sons, Philadelphia
- Yard number: 472
- Laid down: 19 August 1918
- Launched: 19 March 1919
- Commissioned: 5 September 1919
- Decommissioned: 20 October 1922
- Recommissioned: 31 March 1930
- Reclassified: Destroyer minesweeper, DMS-9, 19 November 1940; Miscellaneous auxiliary, AG-108, 5 June 1945
- Decommissioned: 12 November 1945
- Stricken: 5 December 1945
- Fate: Sold 18 November 1946

General characteristics
- Class & type: Clemson-class destroyer
- Displacement: 1,215 tons (1,234 t)
- Length: 314 ft 4 in (95.8 m)
- Beam: 31 ft 9 in (9.7 m)
- Draft: 9 ft 10 in (3.0 m)
- Propulsion: 26,500 shp (19,800 kW); geared turbines, 2 screws
- Speed: 35 knots (65 km/h; 40 mph)
- Complement: 122 officers and enlisted
- Armament: Original 4 × 4 in (102 mm) guns Y-Gun depth charge projector; 12 × 21 in (533 mm) torpedo tubes (removed by 1941-2) Guns were upgraded to 2-3 x 3" 50 caliber, and likely twin powered Bosford AA gun or to add range, the Oerlikon 20 mm AA gun, for World War II

USS Chandler (DD-206/DMS-9/AG-108) was a Clemson-class destroyer in the United States Navy. She was the only ship named for William Eaton Chandler, who served as Secretary of the Navy from 1882 to 1886.

== Construction and commissioning ==
Chandler was launched on 19 March 1919 by William Cramp and Sons Ship and Engine Building Company; sponsored by Mrs. L. H. Chandler; and commissioned on 5 September 1919.

== Service history ==
=== 1920s ===
Assigned to Destroyer Squadron 3 of the United States Atlantic Fleet, Chandler departed Newport, Rhode Island, on 19 December 1919 for duty with U.S. Naval Forces, Turkey. After carrying a diplomatic mission to the Crimea and aiding the American Red Cross in its relief work with Russian refugees, Chandler joined the U.S. Naval Detachment, Adriatic. She served as station ship at Venice, Italy, and had relief duty throughout the Adriatic Sea until January 1921.

Passing through the Suez Canal, Chandler arrived at Cavite in the Philippines on 15 February 1921. She served with the Asiatic Fleet, protecting American interests in the Far East, until 25 August 1922. Clearing Chefoo, China, that day, she arrived at San Francisco, California, on 30 September 1922. She was decommissioned on 20 October 1922 and placed in reserve at Mare Island Navy Yard in California.

=== 1930s ===
Chandler was recommissioned on 31 March 1930 for operations off the United States West Coast, in Hawaii, off the Panama Canal Zone, and in the Caribbean. In 1934, she steamed to New York City for the Presidential Fleet Review of 31 May 1934. In 1936 she took part in radio sound tests, and in 1940 she served as plane guard during the flight of the United States Secretary of the Navy to Hawaii.

Arriving to the Mare Island Navy Yard in California in October 1940, Chandler was converted there into a destroyer minesweeper, and was reclassified DMS-9 on 19 November 1940. As part of her conversion, her number 4 boiler, her fourth funnel, and her torpedo tubes were removed, her depth charge racks were repositioned forward from the stern and angled outboard, and her stern was modified to support minesweeping gear, including davits, a winch, paravanes, and kites. Two 60-kilowatt turbo generators replaced the three original 25-kilowatt electric generators to improve her capability for sweeping magnetic and acoustic mines.

Chandler arrived at Pearl Harbor, Hawaii, on 12 February 1941 to begin operational training and patrol.

=== World War II ===
==== Pearl Harbor, 1941 ====
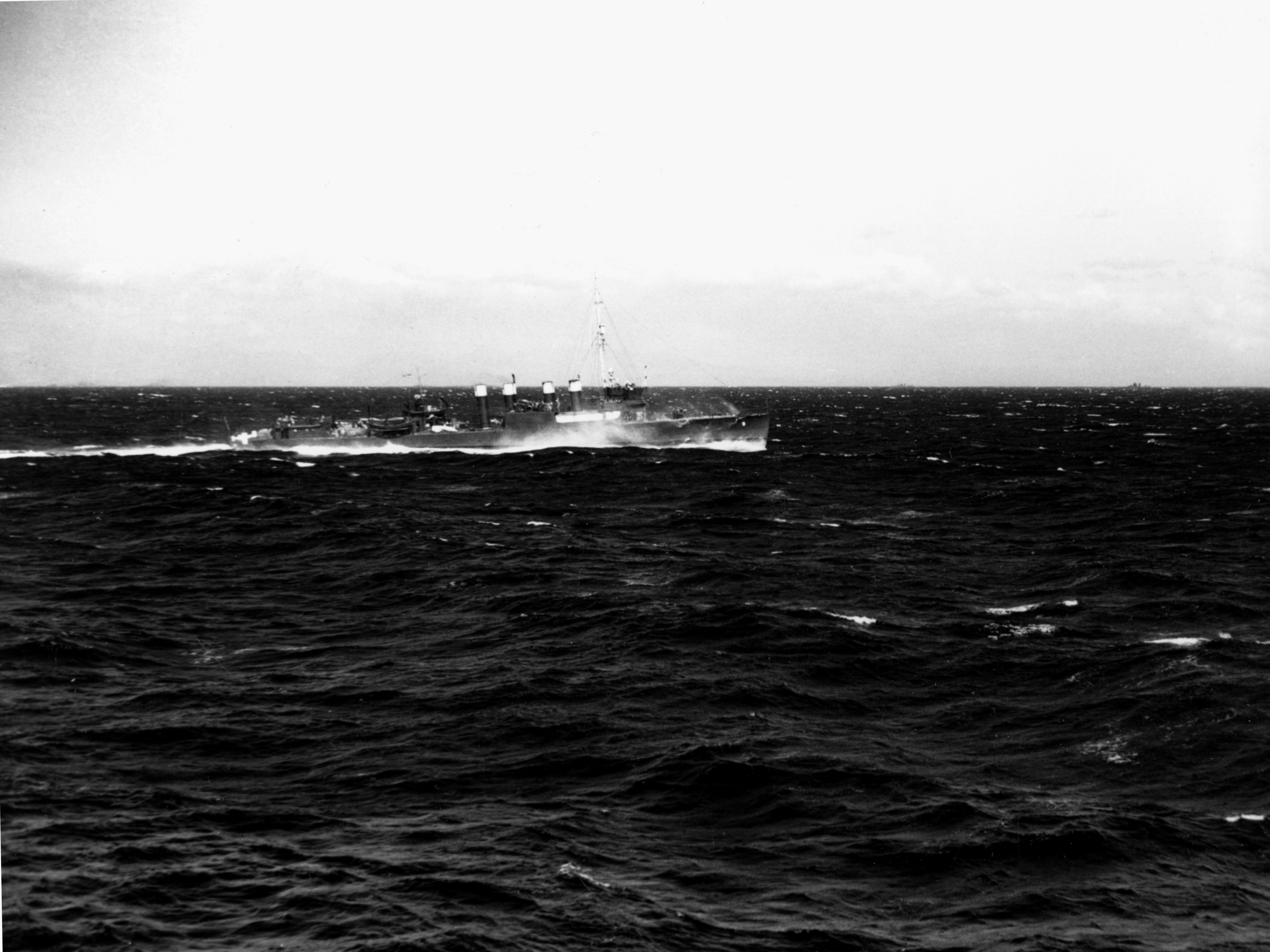
USS Chandler (DMS-9) at sea on 7 December 1941.

Chandler was at sea on 7 December 1941 when the Japanese attacked Pearl Harbor. She returned to her devastated base on 9 December 1941. Until 30 June 1942, she escorted convoys to San Francisco, Palmyra Atoll, Christmas Island, and Midway Atoll, and swept and patrolled in Hawaiian waters.

==== Aleutians, 1942-3 ====
While en route to operations in the Aleutian Islands on 27 July 1942, Chandler collided with the destroyer minesweeper USS Lamberton (DMS-2) in a heavy fog. She underwent repairs from 11 August to 27 September 1942 at Mare Island Navy Yard. On 5 October 1942, she arrived at Dutch Harbor in the Aleutians for patrol and convoy escort duty in the Aleutians. In May 1943, she covered the amphibious landings at Attu, and in August 1943 the landings at Kiska. Leaving the Aleutians in October 1943, Chandler was readied at San Francisco for duty farther south in the Pacific.

==== Marshalls and Marianas, 1944 ====
Chandler docked at Pearl Harbor on 1 January 1944. From there, in a succession of landings, at Majuro (31 January), Eniwetok (17 February–6 March), Saipan (13 June–20 July), and Tinian (21 July–24 July), she swept mines and screened assault shipping. At Eniwetok Atoll, she shared responsibilities with the minesweeper USS Zane in sweeping mines from two critical approaches into the atoll, Deep Entrance and Wide Passage, which was swept of mines between 700 and 900 on the morning of 17 February 1944. Patrolling each invasion area as the operation developed, Chandler joined with Newcomb in sinking the Japanese submarine I-185 on 22 June, at 15°55′N., 147°09′E.*

==== Leyte Gulf, 1944 ====
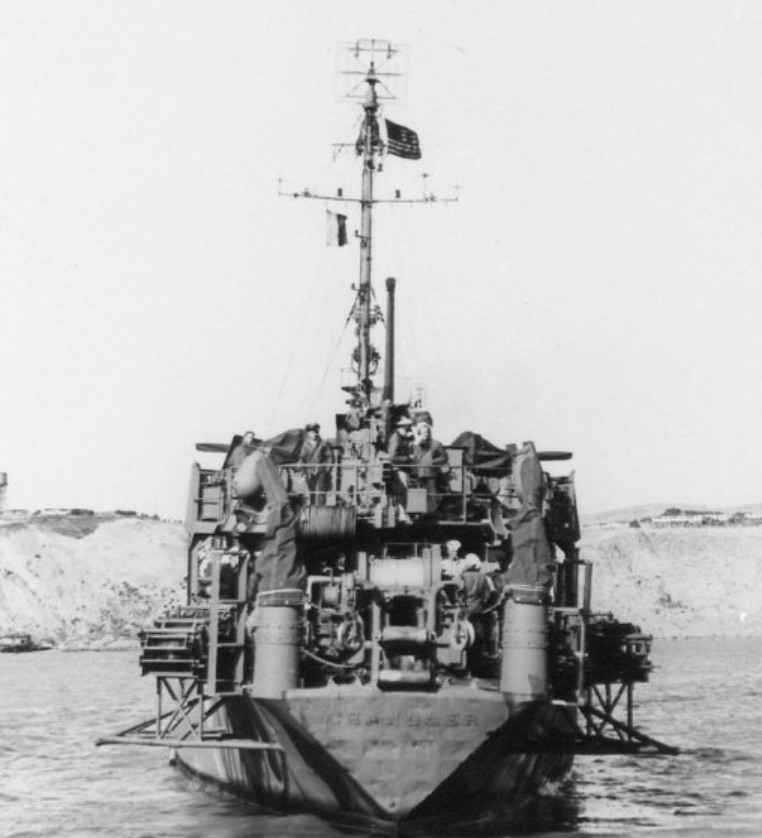
USS Chandler (DMS-9) stern with covered davits that hauled sweep gear on either side, and winch in center

On 17 October 1944, Chandler resumed mine-sweeping in landings, as she sailed into Leyte Gulf, Philippines, in advance of the major force for the assault to sweep a path for the attacking amphibious ships. At 637 on 18 October, Commander W. R. Loud, in charge of the minesweeping ships, gave word that only one fifth of the mines in the critical channel between Honophon and Dinagat Islands had been swept. The channel between the two islands was the path the 700 ship allied convoy would take to the North and South landing areas on Leyte Island, and had to be safe and secured. Though 26 moored mines had been swept, many more remained floating in the Gulf. Three Destroyer/Minesweepers including the Chandler, continued to sweep the mine fields in the channel between Honophon and Dinagat until it was fully cleared. Chandler was also likely tasked with sweeping the approaches to Dinagat Island where Allied ships would enter the Philippines, Looc Bay off Dinagat, and the approaches to the Northeastern coastal towns of Tacloban and Dulag on Leyte Island, which would become the two primary landing areas for Allied transports involved in the invasion of Leyte Gulf.

While near Dulag on Leyte Island, Chandler was visited by native Guerillas from the Philippine Island of Samar, immediately North of Leyte, who brought a message from their commander Lt. Colonel Juan Causing. In September, Causing had tried to unite two of the largest Philippine resistance groups on Samar, one commanded by Col. Pedro V. Merritt, P.A., who was established in the north, and the other by Manuel Valley, an escapee from Bataan, who led an organization in the South. An attempt to unite these two leaders was unsuccessful, and though much good work was done by the resistance fighters, little was completed to aid the plans of General MacArthur's headquarters until after the assault at Leyte Island was completed. Chandler remained on duty, sweeping, patrolling, and screening, through the start of the landings, retiring on 25 October for Manus, Papua, New Guinea, after the delay caused by the Battles for Leyte Gulf, which consisted of several battles East of the large Island of Leyte.

==== Lingayen Gulf, 1945 ====
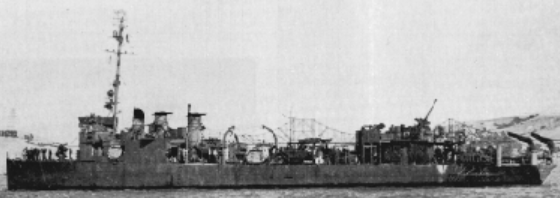
USS Chandler (DMS-9) fully converted to a minesweeper, May 1945. Note three funnels, and squared off stern holding sweep gear. Two davits or cranes used for hauling sweep gear are at her stern.

During the Philippine's Lingayen operation, mine sweeping commenced on 6 January 1945 around 700, with kamikaze attacks at their worst. Task force commander Admiral Jesse B. Oldendorf had anticipated word of heavy mine fields and significant obstacles on the beaches. Unexpectedly, exploratory sweeps during the morning of 6 January, revealed only two floating mines and no moored mines. When the sweepers completed their task on 8 January, a total of only four mines had been recovered. Information from Lt. Commander W. R. Loud indicated as many as ten mines may have been removed by the sweepers by end of day on 7 January, but though it was one of the most dangerous operations for converted Clemson Class destroyer minesweepers of the war, relatively few mines were found in Lingayen Gulf and only one additional mine on the beaches.

===== Rescue of the Hovey =====
In the early morning of 7 January 1945 at 430, Chandler detected low flying planes on her radar, and soon came under heavy fire from Japanese aircraft. Sighting accurately in the moonlit night, fire from Chandler and Hovey, shot down a Japanese aircraft which had been set aflame, that crashed off Hovey's starboard beam. A second low flying aircraft had launched a torpedo, which struck Hovey on her starboard side in the after engine room around 0455, at the instant the burning plane crashed. The resultant flooding broke the ship in half and sunk her within three minutes. The explosion took 22 of her own crew and 24 survivors of Long and Brooks which Hovey had rescued on 6 January. Chandler stood by, recovering 229 officers and men from the Hovey which included survivors of the two ships the Hovey had rescued. The rescue was particularly memorable as around half of the survivors recovered by the Chandler had been twice rescued from sinking or abandoned ships. Among Hovey's survivors was flag Commander Wayne Rowe Loud, in charge of the minesweeping task force, who would be awarded the Navy Cross for his rescues, and indomitable spirit inspiring the sweepers to complete their mission though under continuous enemy fire. Chandler remained on duty in Lingayen Gulf until 10 January, when she cleared for convoy escort operations through mid-February.

==== Iwo Jima, 1945 ====
At Iwo Jima from 16 to 28 February, she gave her experienced aid in sweeping, patrolling, and screening for the buildup and the subsequent assault. Though there was damage to many vessels and smaller sweepers from shore batteries, damage to destroyer minesweepers at Iwo did not occur, as screening battleships and destroyers stayed closer to the sweepers, and the beach areas swept were smaller than those in the Philippine Island chain. As Samuel Morison noted, "Bombardment ships were in position off Iwo by 7:00. Minesweeping began promptly". Though many American vessels were damaged at Iwo Jima, it was placed first before Okinawa and was expected to be a less costly battle. This proved to be the case, particularly for the Navy's Destroyer/Minesweepers.

== Fate ==
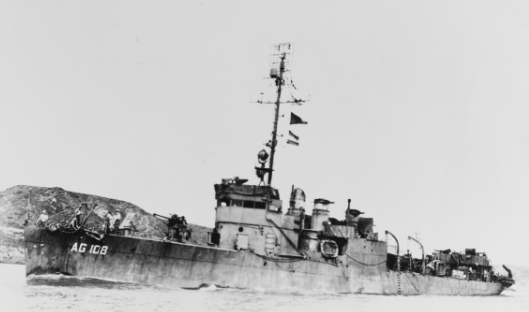
USS Chandler (AG-108) in San Diego, September 1945. Note three stacks, one davit visible portside at stern

Chandler returned to the west coast for overhaul in April. While there, she was reclassified AG-108, on 5 June 1945, and after training, she began a tour of towing targets in gunnery exercises for new ships engaged in shakedown training. While performing this important task, she based on both San Diego and Pearl Harbor. After the end of hostilities, Chandler proceeded to Norfolk, Virginia, arriving on 21 October 1945. There she was decommissioned on 21 November 1945, and sold on 18 November 1946.

== Awards ==
Chandler received eight battle stars for service in World War II.
