= Chandler (surname) =

- Language: English

Origin
- Meaning: candle maker
- Region of origin: Europe

Other names
- Variant forms: Chandelar, Candelar, Chandeler, Chandlar

Chandler, and its variant spellings, is a family name that originated as an occupational surname in medieval England. It applied to a person involved in making or selling candles and similar articles. The earliest records as a surname are attested in Anglo-Norman by Matthew le Candeler in London in 1274 and William le Chandeler in Essex in 1275. It corresponds to the Norman-Picard and (northern) French surnames Candelier, Chandelier and Lechandelier "candle maker".

As of 2010, Chandler ranked as the 404th most popular surname in the United States, with 79,186 citizens.

== People ==
=== A ===
- A. Bertram Chandler (1912–1984), Australian marine officer
- Abiel Chandler (1777–1851), American philanthropist
- Al Chandler (born 1950), American football player
- Albert Chandler (disambiguation), multiple people
- A. Lee Chandler (1922–2012), American judge
- Alexander J. Chandler (1859–1950), Arizona pioneer and founder of Chandler, Arizona
- Alfred Chandler (disambiguation), multiple people
- Allan Chandler (1907–1970), Australian rules footballer
- Allen Chandler (1849–1926), British cricketer
- Alvin Duke Chandler (1902–1987), American academic administrator
- Andrea Chandler, American farmer and sailor
- Andrew Chandler (disambiguation), multiple people
- Anna Chandler (1884–1957), American actress and singer
- Annie Chandler (swimmer) (born 1987), American swimmer
- Arthur Chandler (disambiguation), multiple people
- Ash Chandler, Indian actor

=== B ===
- Ben Chandler (born 1959), American politician
- Bert Chandler (disambiguation), multiple people
- Bill Chandler (1895–1953), American basketball coach
- Bill Chandler (ice hockey) (1930–1991), Canadian ice hockey player
- Bob Chandler (1949–1995), American football player
- Bob Chandler (footballer) (1894–1964), English footballer
- Brett Chandler (born 1975), Australian rules footballer
- Bruce Chandler (born 1952), American politician
- Brynne Chandler (born 1958), American screenwriter
- Bubba Chandler (born 2002), American baseball player
- Bud Chandler (1905–1996), American tennis player

=== C ===
- Caisja Chandler (born 2000), American sprinter
- Caroline Augusta Chandler (1906–1979), American doctor and author
- Carrol Chandler (born 1952), American general
- Catherine Chandler (born 1950), Canadian poet and translator
- Cecil Chandler (1902–1958), British rower
- Charles Chandler (disambiguation), multiple people
- Charlotte Chandler, American biographer and playwright
- Chas Chandler (1938–1996), English musician
- Chick Chandler (1905–1988), American actor
- Christine Chandler (born 1958), American politician
- Christopher Chandler (disambiguation), multiple people
- Claire Chandler (born 1990), Australian politician
- Colby Chandler (CEO) (1925/1926–2021), American businessman
- Collin Chandler (born 2003), American basketball player
- Craig Chandler (born 1970), Canadian businessman

=== D ===
- Dan Chandler (born 1978), American singer
- Dana Chandler (born 1941), American artist and activist
- Daniel Chandler (born 1952), British visual semiotician
- Daniel Chandler (wrestler) (born 1951), American wrestler
- Danny Chandler (1959–2010), American motocross racer
- David Chandler (disambiguation), multiple people
- Dean Chandler (born 1976), English footballer
- Dianne Chandler (born 1946), American model
- Dick Chandler (1910–1969), Australian rules footballer
- Dillard Chandler (1907–1992), American singer
- Don Chandler (1934–2011), American football player
- Donald S. Chandler, American entomologist
- Dorothy Buffum Chandler (1901–1997), American cultural leader
- Doug Chandler (born 1965), American motorcycle racer
- Douglas Chandler (1889–??), American broadcaster

=== E ===
- Ed Chandler (1917–2003), American baseball player
- Eddy Chandler (1894–1948), American actor
- Edgar Chandler (1946–1992), American football player
- Edgar Chandler (minister) (1904–1988), American minister
- Edmund Leavens Chandler (1829–1880), Canadian merchant and politician
- Edward Chandler (disambiguation), multiple people
- Eileen Chandler (1904–1993), British painter
- Elias Chandler (1856–1909), American colonel
- Elisabeth Gordon Chandler (1913–2006), American sculptor
- Elizabeth Margaret Chandler (1807–1834), American poet and writer
- Ella Chandler (born 2000), English cricketer
- Emilie Chandler (born 1983), French politician
- Ernest Chandler (1891–1936), British boxer
- Evan Chandler, plaintiff

=== F ===
- Francis Chandler (1849–1937), British trade unionist
- Fred Chandler (1912–2005), English footballer

=== G ===
- Gene Chandler (born 1937), American singer-songwriter
- Gene G. Chandler (born 1947), American politician
- George Chandler (disambiguation), multiple people
- Gilbert Chandler (1903–1974), Australian politician
- Glenn Chandler (born 1949), Scottish playwright and novelist
- Gordon Chandler (born 1953), American sculptor
- Gordon Chandler (cricketer) (1909–2003), English cricketer
- Grace Chandler (1879–1967), American photographer

=== H ===
- Happy Chandler (1898–1991), American politician
- Harriette L. Chandler (born 1937), American politician
- Harry Chandler (1864–1944), American publisher
- Harvey Chandler (born 1995), English snooker player
- Helen Chandler (1906–1965), American actress
- Henry Chandler (disambiguation), multiple people

=== I ===
- Ian Chandler (disambiguation), multiple people

=== J ===
- Jabarry Chandler (born 1994), Barbadian footballer
- J. A. C. Chandler (1872–1934), American historian and academic administrator
- Jamal Chandler (born 1989), Barbadian footballer
- James Chandler (disambiguation), multiple people
- Jamie Chandler (born 1989), English footballer
- Jamie P. Chandler (born 1977), American political scientist
- Janet Chandler (1911–1994), American model and actress
- Jason Chandler (singer) (born 1969), American vocalist
- Jeff Chandler (disambiguation), multiple people
- Jennifer Chandler (born 1959), American diver
- Jessie Chandler (born 1968), American author
- Jim Chandler (1941–2017), American poet
- Jo Chandler (born 1965), Australian journalist
- Joan Chandler (1923–1979), American actress
- Johanna Chandler (1820–1875), British philanthropist
- John Chandler (disambiguation), multiple people
- Jordan Chandler, litigant
- Joseph Chandler (disambiguation), multiple people
- Joyce Chandler (born 1939), American politician
- J. Wyeth Chandler (1930–2004), American politician

=== K ===
- Kade Chandler (born 2000), Australian rules footballer
- Karen Chandler (1923–2010), American singer
- Karl Chandler (American football) (born 1952), American football player
- Karl Chandler (comedian) (born 1941), Australian writer and comedian
- Katherine Agnes Chandler (1865–1930), American botanist and author
- Kathleen Chandler (born 1932), American politician
- Kennedy Chandler (born 2002), American basketball player
- Kerri Chandler (born 1969), American record producer
- Kevin M. Chandler (born 1960), American politician and lawyer
- Knox Chandler, American musician
- Kyle Chandler (born 1965), American actor

=== L ===
- Lane Chandler (1899–1972), American actor
- Lauryn Chandler, American author
- Lawrence Chandler, British-American composer
- Len Chandler (1935–2023), American musician
- Leonard B. Chandler (1851–1927), American businessman and politician
- Leslie Gordon Chandler (1888–1980), Australian ornithologist
- Lloyd Chandler (1896–1978), American musician
- Lorraine Chandler (1946–2020), American singer-songwriter
- Lucinda Banister Chandler (1828–1911), American social reformer

=== M ===
- Marc Chandler (born 1961), American foreign exchange market analyst
- Margaret Bailey Chandler (1929–1997), American community leader
- Marian Otis Chandler (1866–1952), American businesswoman
- Marjorie Elizabeth Jane Chandler (1897–1983), British paleobotanist
- Marquin Chandler (born 1982), American basketball player
- Martin Spencer Chandler (1828–1893), American farmer and politician
- Mary Chandler (1687–1745), English poet
- Mary Chandler (composer) (1911–1996), composer, pianist and oboist
- Matthew Chandler (disambiguation), multiple people
- Michael Chandler (disambiguation), multiple people
- Michelle Chandler (born 1974), Australian basketball player
- Mike Chandler (born 1958), American stock car racing driver
- Murray Chandler (born 1960), New Zealand chess grandmaster

=== N ===
- Nate Chandler (born 1989), American football player
- Nehemiah Chandler (born 2005), American football player
- Neil Chandler (1949–2022), Australian rules footballer
- Nev Chandler (1946–1994), American broadcaster
- Newton Chandler (1893–1997), Australian rules footballer
- Norman Chandler (1899–1973), American publisher

=== O ===
- Oba Chandler (1946–2011), American convicted murderer
- Oliver P. Chandler (1807–1895), American attorney and politician
- Otis Chandler (1927–2006), American published

=== P ===
- Paul-Gordon Chandler (born 1964), American author
- Peleg Chandler (1816–1889), American lawyer and politician
- Peter Chandler (disambiguation), multiple people
- Phil Chandler (born 1972), New Zealand cricketer
- Polly Chandler, American photographer

=== R ===
- Ralph Chandler (1829–1889), American admiral
- Ray Chandler (1944–2010), American softball coach
- Raymond Chandler (1888–1959), American author
- Raymond F. Chandler (born 1962), American army officer
- Rex Chandler (1937–2014), American politician
- Richard Chandler (disambiguation), multiple people
- Robert Chandler (disambiguation), multiple people
- Rod Chandler (born 1942), American politician
- Roger Chandler, American wrestling coach
- Roger Chandler (politician), English politician
- Ron Chandler, British motorcycle racer
- Roy F. Chandler (1925–2015), American author

=== S ===
- Samuel Chandler (1693–1766), British minister
- Samuel Chandler (politician) (1760–1851), American-Canadian merchant
- Scott Chandler (American football) (born 1985), American football player
- Sean Chandler (born 1996), American football player
- Seth Carlo Chandler (1846–1913), American astronomer
- Sid Chandler (1901–1961), English footballer
- Silas Chandler (1838–1919), American slave
- Simon Chandler (born 1953), British actor
- Spud Chandler (1907–1990), American baseball player
- Stephanie Chandler, American entrepreneur
- Stephen Chandler (disambiguation), multiple people
- Sue Chandler (1940–2023), British schoolteacher
- Sydney Chandler (born 1996), American actress

=== T ===
- Tanis Chandler (1924–2006), French-American actress
- Theophilus P. Chandler Jr. (1845–1928), American architect
- Tertius Chandler (1915–2000), American historian and author
- Theodore E. Chandler (1894–1945), American admiral
- Thomas Chandler (disambiguation), multiple people
- Thornton Chandler (born 1963), American football player
- Tim Chandler (1960–2018), American musician
- Timothy Chandler (born 1990), German-American soccer player
- Tina Chandler (born 1974), American bodybuilder
- Tyson Chandler (born 1982), American basketball player
- Ty Chandler (American football) (born 1998), American football player

=== V ===
- Vedra Chandler (born 1980), American singer and dancer
- Vicki Chandler, American plant geneticist
- Victor Chandler (born 1951), British businessman
- Vivienne Chandler (1947–2013), English-French actress and photographer

=== W ===
- Walter Chandler (disambiguation), multiple people
- Wes Chandler (born 1956), American football player
- Willard H. Chandler (1830–1901), American politician
- William Chandler (disambiguation), multiple people
- Wilson Chandler (born 1987), American basketball player
- Winthrop Chandler (1747–1790), American artist

=== Z ===
- Zachariah Chandler (1813–1879), American businessman and politician

== Fictional characters ==
- Adam Chandler, a character on the television series All My Children
- AJ Chandler, a character on the television series All My Children
- Colby Chandler (All My Children), a character on the television series All My Children
- JR Chandler, a character on the television series All My Children
- Krystal Carey Chandler, a character on the television series All My Children
- Liz Chandler, a character on the soap opera Days of Our Lives
- Marlo Chandler, a character in the comic book series Marvel Comics
- Scott Chandler (All My Children), a character on the television series All My Children
- Skye Chandler, a character on the television series' All My Children, One Life to Live, and General Hospital
- Stuart Chandler, a character on the television All My Children
- Tom Chandler, a character on the television series The Last Ship
- Trisana Chandler, a character in the Circle of Magic series by Tamora Pierce

== See also ==
- Chandler (given name)
- Chantler
- Admiral Chandler (disambiguation)
- Justice Chandler (disambiguation)
- Senator Chandler (disambiguation)
- Chandler (disambiguation)
