= Chandler =

Chandler or The Chandler may refer to:

== Occupations ==
- Chandler (occupation), originally head of the medieval household office responsible for candles, now a person who makes or sells candles
- Ship chandler, a dealer in supplies or equipment for ships

== Arts and entertainment ==
- Chandler (band), an American Christian band
- Chandler (film), a 1971 American neo-noir starring Warren Oates
- Chandler: Red Tide, a 1976 illustrated novel by Jim Steranko
- Chandler Award, for Australian science fiction

== Military ==
- USS Chandler (DD-206), a destroyer which served in World War II
- USS Chandler (DDG-996), a guided-missile destroyer transferred to Taiwan in 2004
- USS Theodore E. Chandler, a destroyer which served in the Korean and Vietnam Wars
- Chandler Air Force Station, a closed radar station in Chandler, Minnesota, U.S.

== People and fictional characters ==
- Chandler (surname), including a list of people and fictional characters
- Chandler (given name), including a list of people and fictional characters

== Places ==
=== Australia ===
- Chandler, Queensland, a suburb of Brisbane
- Chandler Ward, a Brisbane City Council ward
- Chandler, South Australia, a rail siding
- Chandler, Western Australia, a rural locality
- Chandler Highway, in the suburbs of Melbourne
- Chandler River (New South Wales), Australia

=== Canada ===
- Chandler, Quebec, a town
- Chandler, Saskatchewan

=== United States ===
- Chandler River (Alaska)
- Chandler, Arizona, a city
- Chandler, Indiana, in Warrick County
- Chandler, Kansas
- Chandler Bay, Maine
- Chandler River (Maine)
- Chandler Township, Charlevoix County, Michigan
- Chandler Township, Huron County, Michigan
- Chandler, Minnesota, a town
- Chandler, Missouri, an unincorporated community
- Chandler Township, Adams County, North Dakota
- Chandler, Ohio, an unincorporated community
- Chandler, Oklahoma, a city
- Chandler State Wayside, a state park in Oregon
- Chandler, Texas, a city

=== Elsewhere ===
- Chandler (crater), on the Moon
- Chandler Island, Antarctica

== Schools ==
- Chandler Scientific School, formerly part of Dartmouth College, U.S.
- Chandler High School (disambiguation), several schools
- Chandler School, Pasadena, California, U.S.

== Other uses ==
- Chandler Formation, a Mesozoic geologic formation in Canada
- The Chandler Building, Berkeley, California, U.S.
- Albert B. Chandler Hospital, Lexington, Kentucky, U.S.
- Chandler (horse), winner of the 1848 Grand National steeplechase
- Chandler (software), personal information management software
- Chandler Bats, an American baseball bat manufacturer
- Chandler Motor Car, a 1920s American automobile maker

== See also ==
- Chandelier, a branched ornamental light fixture
- Chantler
