= William Henry Chandler =

William Henry Chandler may refer to:

- William Henry Chandler (politician) (1815–1888)
- William Henry Chandler (chemist) (1841–1906)
- William Henry Chandler (painter) (1854–1928)
- William Henry Chandler (botanist) (1878–1970)

== See also ==
- William Chandler (disambiguation)
