= Chandler (given name) =

Chandler is a unisex given name, usually applied to males, and likely derived from surnames reflecting the occupational term chandlery.

== Notable people ==
- Chandler P. Anderson (1866–1936), American politician
- Chandler Beach (1839–1928), American entrepreneur
- Chandler Brayboy (born 2001), American football player
- Chandler Brewer (born 1997), American football player
- Chandler McCuskey Brooks (1905–1989), American physiologist
- Chandler Brossard (1922–1993), American novelist
- Chandler Burr (born 1963), American journalist and author
- Chandler Canterbury (born 1998), American child actor
- Chandler Champion, American beauty pageant contestant
- Chandler C. Cohagen (1889–1985), American architect
- Chandler Coventry (1924–1999), Australian art collector
- Chandler Cowles (1917–1997), American actor
- Chandler Cox (born 1996), American football player
- Chandler Cunningham-South (born 2003), English rugby union footballer
- Chandler Davidson (1936–2021), American political scientist
- Chandler Davis (1926–2022), American-Canadian mathematician
- Chandler Egan (1884–1936), American golfer
- Chandler Fenner (born 1990), American football player
- Chandler González (born 1973), Cuban footballer
- Chandler Hale (1873–1951), American diplomat
- Chandler Harper (1914–2004), American golfer
- Chandler C. Harvey (1866–1940), American publisher
- Chandler Hoffman (born 1990), American soccer player
- Chandler Huntington (1849–1921), American politician
- Chandler Hutchison (born 1996), American basketball player
- Chandler W. Johnson (1905–1945), American soldier
- Chandler Jones (born 1990), American football player
- Chandler Lawson (born 1990), American beauty pageant contestant
- Chandler Martin (born 2002), American football player
- Chandler Massey (born 1990), American actor
- Chandler McDaniel (born 1998), Filipino footballer
- Chandler Moore (born 1995), American singer-songwriter
- Chandler O'Dwyer (born 1999), English footballer
- Chandler Owen (1889–1967), American activist
- Chandler David Owens Sr. (1931–2011), American minister
- Chandler Park, American physician
- Chandler Parsons (born 1988), American basketball player
- Chandler Rathfon Post (1881–1959), American professor
- Chandler Quarles (born 1990), American musician
- Chandler Riggs (born 1999), American actor
- Chandler Rivers (born 2003), American football player
- Chandler Robbins (1810–1882), American minister
- Chandler Robbins (1918–2017), American ornithologist
- Chandler Rogers (born 2001), American football player
- Chandler Shepherd (born 1992), American baseball player
- Chandler Smith (born 2002), American stock car racing driver
- Chandler Sprague (died 1955), American screenwriter
- Chandler Stephenson (born 1994), Canadian ice hockey player
- Chandler Sterling (1911–1984), American bishop
- Chandler Swope (born 1942), American politician
- Chandler Thornton, American political operative
- Chandler Travis (born 1950), American musician
- Chandler Tuttle, American writer
- Chandler Vaudrin (born 1997), American basketball player
- Chandler Vaughn (born 2000), American soccer player
- Chandler J. Wells (1814–1887), American politician
- Chandler Whitmer (born 1991), American football player and coach
- Chandler Williams (1985–2013), American football player
- Chandler Woodcock, American politician
- Chandler Wooten (born 1999), American football player
- Chandler Worthy (born 1993), American football player
- Chandler Zavala (born 1999), American football player

== Fictional characters ==
- Chandler Bing, a character on the television series Friends
- Chandler Charming, Snow White's husband in Chris Colfer's The Land of Stories

== See also ==
- Chandler (surname)
- Chandler (disambiguation)
