= Christopher Chandler =

Christopher Chandler or Chris Chandler may refer to:

- Christopher Chandler (businessman), New Zealand businessman
- Christopher Chandler (politician), lawyer and politician
- Christopher N. Chandler, former journalist and political activist
- Chris Chandler (American football), former football player who played as a quarterback in the National Football League

== See also ==
- Chandler (disambiguation)
- Chris Chantler (disambiguation)
- Christine Chandler, member of the New Mexico House of Representatives
- Christine Chaundler, English author
