= Cindy Chandler =

Cindy Chandler may refer to:

- Cindy Chandler (Lost), fictional character of Lost
- Cindy Chandler née Parker, fictional character of All My Children

== See also ==
- Cynthia Chandler Preston Cortlandt, fictional character of All My Children portrayed by Jane Elliot
- Chandler (surname)
