= Delta Theta Psi =

Delta Theta Psi may refer to:

- Delta Theta Psi (Wooster), a local sorority at the College of Wooster
- Delta Theta Psi (sorority), a South Asian local sorority at the University of Michigan
