= The Color EP =

EP by Chandler Roberts
- Released: February 26, 2016
- Genre: Worship, Christian pop
- Length: 21:15
- Producer: Seth Penn

Chandler Roberts chronology
Art from the Ashes (2012)	The Color EP (2016)

The Color EP is the second extended play by Chandler Roberts. She released the EP on February 26, 2016. Chandler worked with Seth Penn, in the production of this EP.

== Critical reception ==
Professional ratings
Review scores
Source	Rating
365 Days of Inspiring Media	4.5/5 stars
New Release Today	3.5/5 stars

Awarding the EP three and a half stars from New Release Today, Kaitlyn Gosnell states, "The Color EP fuses heartfelt and vulnerable lyrics with unforgettable musical soundscapes to create a wonderful worship experience that showcases CCM at its finest." Jonathan Andre, giving the EP four and a half stars at 365 Days of Inspiring Media, writes, "Heartfelt and emotional, comforting and enjoyable; this is a must-have for anyone who loves pop/worship music, and anyone who loves anything different and unique as compared to songs overplayed on the radio recently."

== Track listing ==
No.	Title	Length
1.	"Lionheart"	4:22
2.	"Rising Setting"	4:03
3.	"Fight Your Fear"	4:17
4.	"Color"	4:43
5.	"Victory Song"	3:50
Total length:		21:15
