= Bert Chandler =

Bert Chandler may refer to:

- Bert Chandler (Australian footballer) (1913–1961), Australian rules footballer
- Bert Chandler (footballer, born 1897) (1897–1963), English football right back
- Bert D. Chandler (1869–1947), American jurist
