= Chandler High School =

Chandler High School may refer to:

- Chandler High School (Victoria) in Keysborough, Victoria, Australia
- Chandler High School (Arizona) in Chandler, Arizona, USA
- Chandler High School (Oklahoma) in Chandler, Oklahoma, USA, listed on the NRHP in Oklahoma

== See also ==
- Chandler School
