= Thomas Chandler =

Thomas or Tom Chandler may refer to:

== Politicians ==
- Thomas Alberter Chandler (1871–1953), U.S. Representative from Oklahoma
- Thomas R. Chandler (born 1954), candidate for Congress from Ohio in the 1990s
- Thomas Chandler (New Hampshire politician) (1772–1866), U.S. Representative for New Hampshire
- Thomas Chandler Jr. (1740–1798), Vermont colonial leader, founder of Chester, Vermont
- Thomas Bradbury Chandler (1726–1790), American priest of the Church of England and author

== Characters ==
- Superintendent Tom Chandler (The Bill), a character in the British television drama The Bill
- Thomas Chandler or Little Chandler, the central character of James Joyce's short story "A Little Cloud"

== See also ==
- Thomas Chandler Haliburton (1796–1865), Canadian author
- Thomas Chandler Thacher (1858–1945), U.S. politician
- Chandler School, founded by Thomas Chandler and Catherine Chandler
