= Robert Chandler =

Robert Chandler may refer to:

== Sports ==
- Bob Chandler (1949–1995), American football player
- Bob Chandler (footballer) (1894–1964), English footballer

== Politics ==
- Robert Chandler (MP for Devizes) (fl. 1421), English politician
- Robert Chandler (MP for Chippenham), fl.1382–1389, MP for Chippenham

== Business ==
- Robert Chandler (network executive) (1928–2008), American television executive
- Robert W. Chandler (1921–1996), American journalist, businessman, and philanthropist

== Other ==
- Robert F. Chandler (1907–1991), horticulturalist
- Robert Chandler (RAF officer) (1898–?), English World War I flying ace
- Robert Chandler (translator), British poet and translator
