= David Chandler =

David Chandler may refer to:

- David Chandler (chemist) (1944–2017), American physical chemist
- David G. Chandler (1934–2004), British historian specializing in Napoleonic history
- David P. Chandler (born 1933), American historian specializing in Cambodian history
- David A. Chandler (born c. 1947), justice of the Supreme Court of Mississippi
- David Leon Chandler (1937–1994), American journalist
- David Chandler (writer) (1912–1990), American screenwriter, novelist and playwright
