= Sigma Delta Pi (fraternity) =

American college fraternity (1858–1889)

- S.D.P.
- Founded: September 1858; 168 years ago Chandler Scientific School
- Type: Social
- Affiliation: Indepdendent
- Status: Merged
- Merge date: 1889
- Successor: Beta Theta Pi
- Scope: National
- Chapters: 3
- Patron: Vitruvius
- Other name: Vitruvian
- Headquarters: Hanover, New Hampshire; United States

Sigma Delta Pi (S.D.P.), also called Vitruvian, was an American college fraternity. It was established in 1858 at the Chandler Scientific School of Dartmouth College in Hanover, New Hampshire. It established three chapters before going inactive when the founding chapter joined Beta Theta Pi in 1889.

== History ==
Sigma Delta Pi was established at the Chandler Scientific School of Dartmouth College in Hanover, New Hampshire in September 1858. In its charter, the fraternity was also named Vitruvian, in tribute to the Roman architect Vitruvius.. Its founders were all members of the class of 1858 from the scientific school. Its founders were Henry L. Bartholomew, William H. Fessenden, Augustus Livingstone, W. U. Potter, John A. Staples, and Charles W. Thompson, with the assistance of professor I. S. Woodman.

The Dartmouth chapter initially met in the rooms of its members, but had secured a hall by 1879. All of its members all came from the Chandler Scientific School. Sigma Delta Pi remained a local fraternity until a second chapter was chartered at Cornell University in 1871. This was followed by a third chapter at the College of Wooster in 1873. However, both chapters were weak and went inactive after three years, returning the Dartmouth chapter to local status.

Sigma Delta Pi published a catalog in 1872 and 1882. In 1879, the fraternity had initiated 290 members. By 1882, it had grown to 323 members. In January 1887, Sigma Delta Pi was one of six fraternities that lost its hall in a fire at Dartmouth. The fraternity had insurance coverage of $500 and was able to obtain temporary quarters.

The Dartmouth chapter became the Alpha Omega chapter of Beta Theta Pi in 1889.

== Symbols ==
Sigma Delta Pi's badge was a gold shield, displaying the Greek letters "S.D.P.", a sextant, and the letters "S" and "D" on either side of a clinched hand. Above the shield was scroll with the date "1858". Below the shield was another scroll bearing the name "Dartmouth".

== Chapters ==
Following are the chapters of Sigma Delta Pi.

Chapter	Charter date and range	Institution	Location	Status	Ref.
Alpha	September 1858–1889	Chandler Scientific School	Hanover, New Hampshire	Merged (ΒΘΠ)	(Note: Chapter merged into Beta Theta Pi, forming its Alpha Omega chapter.)
Beta	1871–1874	Cornell University	Ithaca, New York	Inactive	
Gamma	1873–1877	College of Wooster	Wooster, Ohio	Inactive	

== See also ==
- Dartmouth College fraternities and sororities
- List of College of Wooster fraternities and sororities
- List of Cornell University fraternities and sororities
- List of social fraternities
