= Senator Chandler =

Senator Chandler may refer to:

== Members of the United States Senate ==
- Happy Chandler (1898–1991), U.S. Senator from Kentucky
- William E. Chandler (1835–1917), U.S. Senator from New Hampshire
- Zachariah Chandler (1813–1879), U.S. Senator from Michigan

== United States state senate members ==
- Harriette L. Chandler (born 1937), Massachusetts State Senate
- Henry Wilkins Chandler (1852–1938), Florida State Senate
- John Chandler (1762–1841), Maine State Senate
- John Alonzo Chandler (1831–1902), Wisconsin State Senate
- John E. Chandler (1915–1982), Kansas State Senate
- Leonard B. Chandler (1851–1927), Massachusetts State Senate
- Oliver P. Chandler (1807–1895), Vermont State Senate
- Rex Chandler (1937–2014), Oklahoma State Senate
- Thomas Chandler (New Hampshire politician) (1772–1866), New Hampshire State Senate
- Walter Chandler (1887–1967), Tennessee State Senate
- Willard H. Chandler (1830–1901), Wisconsin State Senate
- William Henry Chandler (politician) (1815–1888)

== See also ==
- Senator Candler (disambiguation)
