= Edward Chandler =

Edward Chandler may refer to:

- Edward Chandler (American football) (1925–1999), American football coach
- Edward Barron Chandler (1800–1880), lieutenant-governor of New Brunswick
- Edward Chandler (bishop) (c. 1660–1750), Anglican bishop
- Edward Marion Augustus Chandler (1887–1973), African-American chemist
- Edward Chandler (rower) (1902–?), British rower
- Ed Chandler (1917–2003), baseball pitcher
- Eddy Chandler (1894–1948), American actor
