= Senator Candler =

Senator Candler may refer to:

- Allen D. Candler (1834–1910), Georgia State Senate
- Milton A. Candler (1837–1909), Georgia State Senate

== See also ==
- Senator Chandler (disambiguation)
