= Charles Chandler =

Charles Chandler is the name of:

- Charles Chandler, actor, shot dead while making The Captive (1915 film)
- Charles Chandler (cricketer) (1870–1940), Jamaican cricketer
- Charles Chandler (rower) (1911–1982), American rower and Olympic gold medalist
- Charles F. Chandler (1836–1925), American chemist and public-health reformer
- Charles deForest Chandler (1878–1939), American military aviator
- Charles Rodney Chandler (1938–1968), American officer subject of Assassination of Charles Rodney Chandler
- Charles Walter Chandler, Australian journalist, associated with Reginald Louis Solomon
- Charles Chandler (comics), a Marvel Comics character
