= Ray Chandler =

American softball player and coach

- Born: Delbert Ray Chandler; 1944; Tobaccoville, North Carolina, United States
- Died: September 23, 2010 (aged 66); California, United States
- Occupations: Coach, teacher
- Years active: 1984–2010
- Website: Carolina Cardinals

Delbert Ray Chandler (1944 – September 23, 2010) was the founder of the Carolina Cardinals, a girls' softball program from North Carolina. Ray Chandler was known as the "Father of Fastpitch" and was instrumental in helping 100 of his former softball players sign college scholarships.

== Carolina Cardinals ==
Chandler, who lived in Tobaccoville, was inducted into the North Carolina Amateur Softball Association's Hall of Fame/Hall of Honor in 2003. He began coaching in 1984 and in 1989, he founded the Carolina Cardinals, the oldest continuous ASA girls' fastpitch softball organization in North Carolina.

== Death ==
Assistant Athletics Director Alexis McCoy confirmed Ray Chandler, 66, had been traveling with a softball team on the west coast when he became sick. He had been in the hospital since Aug. 12.

West said doctors thought he was getting better but his condition took a turn for the worse in mid September. Chandler has been on the Reagan softball staff for all of the program's first five seasons, including four as head coach.

For the last year, Coach Chandler has been coaching and teaching at Ronald W. Reagan High School. In an interview with two of his former softball players, they told that he was never cross with them at practice or games win or lose. The two girls told that because of his kind personality; that's what made him so likable with players, students, and the staff. Sadly four months later a student of Ray Chandler died in a car wreck.

== See also ==
- National Pro Fastpitch, the main professional women's softball league in the United States
- International Softball Federation, the governing body of Softball
- Softball Australia, the governing body of softball in Australia
- Comparison of baseball and softball
- Rounders - a similar game from which baseball and softball are thought to have evolved
- Tee Ball - A reformed version of baseball
- Dartball - A game of darts that uses rules similar to softball and is played on a large dartboard that resembles a softball field.
- Safe haven games
- Eddie Feigner
- Pekin Lettes, the oldest member-sanctioned ASA softball team in the United States
- Baseball
- Softball in Ireland
- European Softball Federation
- NCAA Division I Softball Championship
- Amateur Softball Association
