= Peter Chandler =

Peter Chandler may refer to:

- Peter Chandler (soccer) (born 1953), former American soccer player
- Peter Chandler (politician) (born 1965), Australian politician
- Peter Chandler (entomologist) (1944–2026), British entomologist, awarded H. H. Bloomer Award

== See also ==
- Peter (disambiguation)
- Chandler (surname)
