= Henry Chandler =

Henry Chandler may refer to:

- Henry F. Chandler (1835–1906), American soldier and Medal of Honor recipient
- Henry P. Chandler (1880–1975), first Director of the Administrative Office of the United States Courts
- Henry Wilkins Chandler (1852–1938), First African American graduate of Bates College, Florida Senator, and lawyer
- Henry William Chandler (1828–1889), English classical scholar
