= Chantler =

Chantler is a last name. Notable people with this last name include:

- Chris Chantler, several people
- Christopher Chantler, Australian physicist
- Cyril Chantler (born 1939), British paediatric nephrologist
- John Chantler McDougall (1842–1917), Canadian missionary, civil servant, and author
- Scott Chantler (born 1972), Canadian cartoonist and illustrator

== See also ==
- Chandler (disambiguation)
