= Richard Chandler =

Richard Chandler may refer to:

- Richard Chandler (antiquary) (1737–1810), English antiquary
- Richard Chandler-Cavendish (died 1769), took the name of Cavendish in 1751, MP for Wendover
- Richard Chandler (businessman) (born 1958/59), New Zealand born businessman
- Dick Chandler (1910–1969), Australian rules footballer
- Richard Chandler (wool-stapler) (died 1810), wool-stapler of Gloucester
