= Justice Chandler =

Justice Chandler may refer to:

- Bert D. Chandler (1869–1947), associate justice and chief justice of the Michigan Supreme Court
- David A. Chandler (born c. 1947), associate justice of the Supreme Court of Mississippi
- A. Lee Chandler (1922–2012), associate justice of the South Carolina Supreme Court
