= E. Joan Gibbons =

British archaeologist and museum curator

Elizabeth Joan Gibbons FLS
- Born: 1902; Essex, England
- Died: 2 December 1988
- Occupation: Botanist

Elizabeth Joan Gibbons FLS (1902 – 2 December 1988) was a British botanist. Her Flora of Lincolnshire, which was the first flora of that county, was the first county flora to be written by a woman. She was also the first woman elected as president for a second term by the Lincolnshire Naturalists’ Union.

== Biography ==
Gibbons was born in Essex, but her family moved to Holton le Moor (Lincolnshire) in 1907 when Gibbons was five. Through her father, Rev. Thomas Gibbons, she attended meetings of the Lincolnshire Naturalists' Union as a child and joined as a member when she was 18. She became the Botanical Secretary of the LNU in 1936, a position she held for more than 50 years, and served as the Union's President for the first time in 1939.

In 1946, she joined the Botanical Society of Britain and Ireland and became the vice-county recorder for the two Lincolnshire Vice-counties (VC 53 and 54). She was an avid field-worker and contributed a large number of records to the dataset for Lincolnshire; her contributions were consolidated in her 1975 publication The Flora of Lincolnshire. The Flora of Lincolnshire, which was the first flora of that county, was the first county flora to be written by a woman. She was also the first woman elected as president for a second term by the Lincolnshire Naturalists’ Union. In her fieldwork she also worked with John H. Chandler. Gibbons was also active in, and a founder of, the Lincolnshire Naturalists’ Trust, an affiliation of the Union, that focused on conservation work. Gibbons personally undertook the rescue of Iris spuria by transplanting specimens to Cambridge University Botanic Garden. Gibbons was also interested in the history of botanists, and recorded notes about botanists’ lives throughout her work, which she used to inform research about their collections.

Gibbons was elected as a Fellow of the Linnean Society in 1969. She was also a member of the Society for Lincolnshire History and Archaeology. For twenty eight years Gibbons was assistant county secretary of the Girl Guide Association, and was active in the handicapped guides at county level.

Gibbons moved with two sisters from Holton le Moor to Northlands House in Glentworth, after the death of her brother in 1972. She died there in 1988.

== Legacy ==
After her death in 1988, Gibbons’s collected herbarium was donated to the Natural History Museum, where in combination with the collection of Rev. E. A. Woodruffe-Peacock it forms the basis for the Lincolnshire Plants: Past and Future National Lotteries research project.

== Publications ==
- Collins, E.J. 1975. The Flora of Lincolnshire.
- Collins, E.J. and Weston, I. 1985. Supplement to The Flora of Lincolnshire. Lincolnshire Naturalists' Union.
