= Andrew Chandler =

Andrew Chandler is the name of:

- Andrew Chandler (actor), American voice actor
- Andrew Chandler (golfer) (born 1953), English golfer

== See also ==
- Chandler (surname)
