= John Chandler (disambiguation) =

John Chandler is an American politician and soldier from Maine.

John Chandler may also refer to:

- John Chandler (athlete) (1907–1969), South African athlete
- John Chandler (bishop) (died 1426), medieval Bishop of Salisbury
- John Chandler (clergyman) (1806–1876), compiler of The Hymns of the Primitive Church
- John Chandler (educator) (1923–2022), 12th president of Williams College
- John Chandler (sheriff) (1693–1762), judge of probate and sheriff of Worcester County, Massachusetts
- John Chandler (sport shooter) (1924–2016), British Olympic shooter
- John Alonzo Chandler (1831–1902), Wisconsin state senator
- John Beals Chandler (1887–1962), Lord Mayor of Brisbane (1940–1952) and member of Queensland parliament
- John Davis Chandler (1935–2010), American film character actor
- John E. Chandler (1915–1982), Kansas state senator
- John H. Chandler (1909–1987), English botanist
- John Westbrooke Chandler (1764–1804/5), British painter

== See also ==
- John Chandler Gurney (1896–1985), U.S. senator known as Chan Gurney
