= Ian Chandler =

Ian Chandler may refer to:

- Ian Chandler (footballer) (born 1968), English former footballer
- Ian Chandler (priest) (born 1965), Archdeacon of Plymouth
- Ian Chandler (cyclist) (born 1951), Australian cyclist
