= Chandler, South Australia =

Railway siding in South Australia

Chandler

General information
- Location: Anangu Pitjantjatjara Yankunytjatjara Lands
- Coordinates: 26°58′12″S 133°22′07″E
- Line: Tarcoola-Darwin
- Platforms: 1

History
- Opened: 1978
Location
- Location within South Australia

Chandler (or Chandler Siding), in the far north-west corner of the state of South Australia, is a rail siding on the Adelaide-Darwin rail corridor. It is about 56 kilometres (35 mi) north of the town of Marla near the junction of the Stuart Highway and the entry to the Anangu Pitjantjatjara Yankunytjatjara Aboriginal lands (APY Lands).

It was named in 1872 by the state government after an operator on the Overland Telegraph Line who lived nearby.

It was one of nine sidings to which names were assigned in 1978 in connection with the Tarcoola to Alice Springs railway, which was completed in 1980. Although the experiential tourism train, The Ghan, passes once a week on its journey between Adelaide and Darwin, the train is not accessible at Chandler.
