= The Chandler Building =

Historic building in Berkeley, California, United States

Coordinates: 37°51′54.9″N 122°15′31.37″W

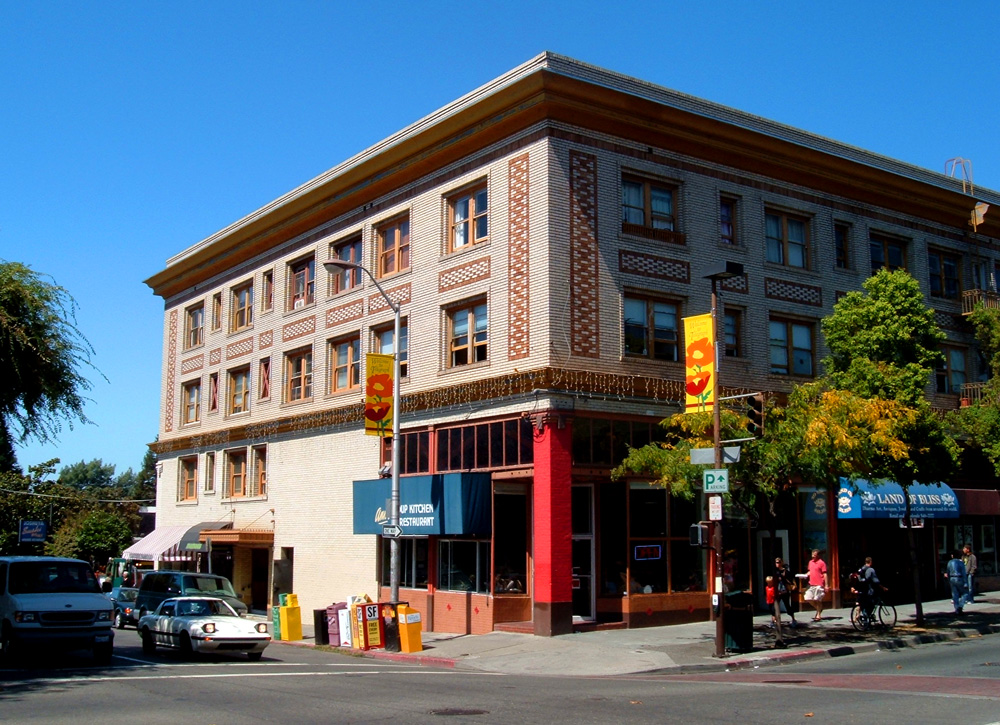
The Chandler Building

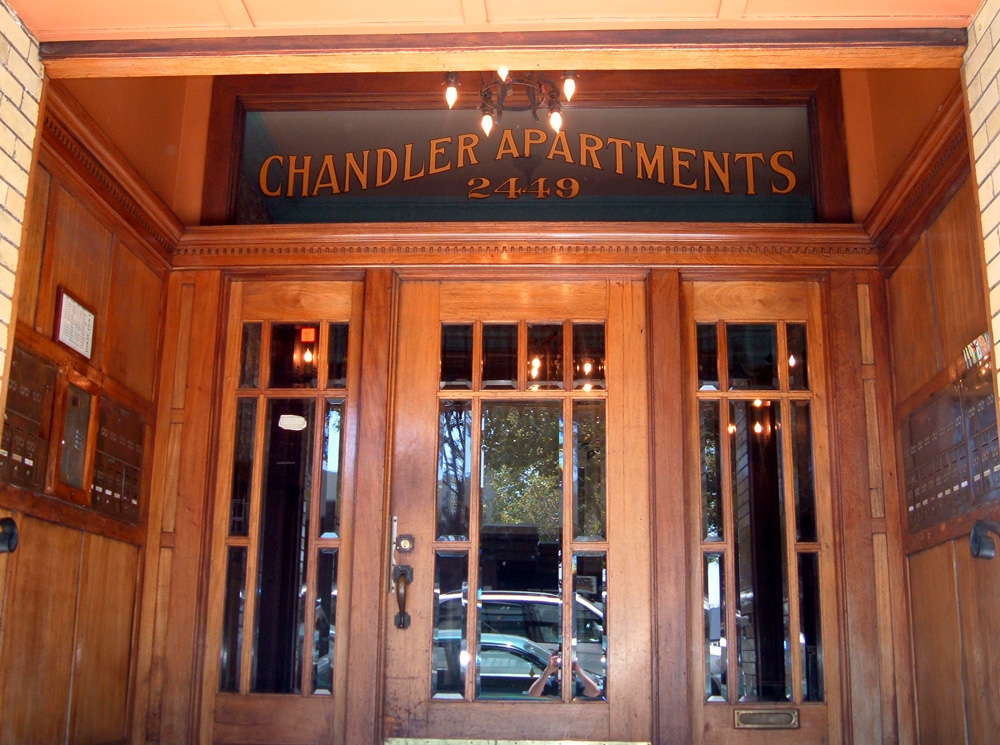
front door

The Chandler Building (sometimes called the Chandler Apartments) is a historic building at the corner of Dwight Way and Telegraph Avenue in Berkeley, California. It is 4 stories tall. It was built in the 1920s.

The building is the featured setting of a 2002 mystery novel The Chandler Apartments by Owen Hill, who wrote the book while living there. The building is currently unoccupied as a result of a fire on 22 November 2015.

It is the former residence of novelist Jonathan Lethem.
