= William Henry Chandler (painter) =

American painter

William Henry Chandler (1854 – February 26, 1928) was an American pastel artist. His works include landscapes, winter landscapes, marine and seascapes, still life fruit and fowl.

Chandler was born in New York City. He was raised by deeply religious parents of the Christian faith. This would influence him his entire life, as he was not only known for his art, but also as a great humanitarian.

Chandler's first job was in Chicago as a carver of cameos. While in Chicago, he married and he and his wife had three daughters. His wife and youngest daughter died early in his marriage. Upon their deaths, Chandler moved to New Jersey, so that his sister could help care for his two surviving daughters. After moving to New Jersey in 1887, Chandler and his brother started the William Henry Chandler Company in New York City. It was at this company that Chandler would produce his artworks that he is known for today. His brother was put in charge of the framing, packing and selling of the works. His art was sold through stores nationwide, including Marshall Fields and The May Company. He worked in pastels, that he imported from France. At his company, he employed 20 other artists, who also worked on pastel paintings. His work was exhibited at the International Exposition in Paris in 1900–1901. He was greatly influenced by the Hudson River School of Art. In turn, it is said that his work influenced other artists, such as Maxfield Parrish.

Chandler was a popular artist in his own time. His style was frequently copied by other artists of the era. His original works were mass-produced as prints and lithographs by such publishing houses as Taber-Prang, Hallen and Weiner (NY), Joseph Hoover (Philadelphia), and Mueller and Lucksinger Co. (NY).

Chandler died on February 26, 1928, and was buried at the Rosedale Cemetery in Orange, New Jersey.
