= Edgar Chandler (minister) =

American civil rights activist

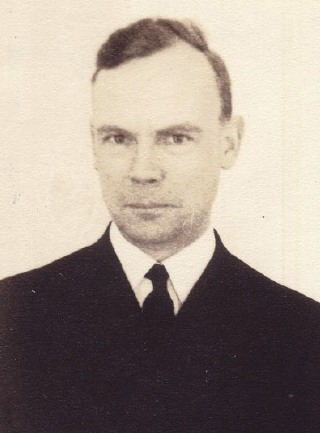
- Chandler, c. 1930
- Born: August 17, 1904; Providence, Rhode Island, U.S.
- Died: May 7, 1988 (aged 83); Concord, New Hampshire, U.S.
- Education: Boston University; Harvard University
- Organization: World Council of Churches
- Spouse: Ruth Doggett (m. 1928)
- Children: 5

Edgar Hugh Storer Chandler (August 17, 1904 – May 7, 1988) was an American congregational minister, navy chaplain, and active leader in the civil rights movement who worked with Martin Luther King Jr. and others.

== Early years ==
Edgar Chandler was born in Providence, Rhode Island, but grew up in Nahant, Massachusetts. His father, Henry J. Chandler, was an engineer at General Electric in Lynn, Massachusetts and later became a Congregational minister.

He graduated from Boston University, where he met his wife, Ruth Doggett. They married in 1928.

After earning his theology degree from Andover-Newton Theological Seminary, he became the minister of Central Congregational Church in the Jamaica Plain section of Boston.

At the onset of World War II, he enlisted in the Navy, where he became a chaplain and rose to the rank of Commander. He became the head chaplain of the Seventh Fleet in the European theater and was stationed in England for most of the war years.

His son was Hugh Storer Chandler, a philosopher at the University of Illinois.

== Work with refugees ==
Chandler directed the World Council of Churches' refugee service in Geneva from 1949 to 1960 and oversaw the relocation of many thousands of refugees from all over the world. In recognition of this work, he was given a knighthood from the Netherlands (knight-officer of the order of Orange-Nassau) and honors from West Germany and Greece, as well as appointment as an honorary member of The Order of the British Empire.

He wrote about his experiences during his years of working with refugees in a memoir, High Tower of Refuge (New York: Praeger, 1959).

== Chicago and civil rights ==
Chandler was executive director of the Church Federation of Greater Chicago during the 1960s and worked closely with Rev. Martin Luther King Jr. in the Chicago civil rights movement. He also participated in King's civil rights march from Selma to Montgomery, Alabama in 1965, and was co-organizer (with Edwin "Bill" Berry, head of the Chicago Urban League) of a civil rights rally in July, 1964, at Soldier Field in Chicago, at which King was the main speaker.

One of his earliest acts in the civil rights movement was a multi-racial "wade-in" at the segregated Rainbow Beach on Chicago's lakefront. Then, in 1967, he moved with his family to the West Side of Chicago, to a nearly all-black neighborhood, as part of the movement to promote equal housing in the city.

"There was no religious leader in Chicago who was more instrumental in bringing about an understanding of the civil rights movement to the people of Chicago than Ed Chandler," Msgr. John Egan, a Catholic pastor at Chicago's Presentation Church during the 1960s, remembered in an article on Chandler in the Valley News of Lebanon, N.H.

He was an adjunct teacher at Chicago Theological Seminary during the 1960s, where he conducted a seminar in which Jesse Jackson was a young divinity student. Chandler later hired Jackson at the Church Federation of Greater Chicago and they became friends.

Chandler "really helped to bring me into the civil rights movement", Jackson was quoted as saying in the Valley News article. "He helped to hire me when I had no money, and helped sustain my family."
