= George Chandler (disambiguation) =

George Chandler (1898–1985) was an American actor.

George Chandler may also refer to:

- George Clarke Chandler (1906–1964), Canadian broadcaster
- George Chandler (priest) (1779–1859), Dean of Chichester Cathedral, 1830–1859
- George Chandler (librarian), National Library of Australia director
- George Chandler, American vocalist with Olympic Runners and Londonbeat
- George Fletcher Chandler (1872–1964), first Superintendent of the New York State Police
