= Polly Chandler =

American photographer

Polly Chandler is an American photographer noted for her unique portrait style illuminating the personality of her subjects through selective backgrounds and the use of large format cameras.

== Photography career ==
Polly Chandler began her career in graphic design, but became focused on photography and returned to Southern Illinois University earning an M.F.A. degree in photography. After graduation, Chandler moved to Austin, Texas began exhibiting in galleries and museums and became the photographer for the Texas House of Representatives. Chandler's photography has appeared in photography magazines including the Photo District News, B&W Magazine, American Photo, Shots Magazine, and PhotoLife, and has been selected for exhibits by Jock Sturges and Keith Carter.
