= Sid Chandler =

English footballer (1901–1961)

Personal information
- Full name: Sidney Ellis Chandler
- Date of birth: 2 December 1895
- Place of birth: Paddington, England
- Date of death: 1961 (aged 59–60)
- Position: Wing-half

Senior career*
Years	Team	Apps	(Gls)
1924–1925	Southall		
1925–1926	Aston Villa		
1926–1928	Preston North End	65	(12)
1928–1931	Reading	84	(1)
1931	Canterbury Waverley		
Total		149	(13)
- * Club domestic league appearances and goals

Sidney Ellis Chandler (30 May 1901 – 1961) was an English footballer who played in the Football League for Preston North End and Reading.
