= Jamie P. Chandler =

American political scientist, television commentator, and writer

- Born: Jamie Patrick Chandler; Plymouth, Massachusetts, United States
- Education: Harvard College (BA)
- Occupations: Political scientist; Political commentator; Columnist
- Years active: 2004–present

Jamie P. Chandler (born 1977) is an American political scientist, television commentator, and writer. He is an expert on American elections, public opinion, Congress, and US foreign policy. He teaches at the Colin Powell School for Civic and Global Leadership at CUNY City College.

== Journalism and commentary ==
Chandler is a frequent on-air guest commentator for CBS News Up to the Minute, WCBS-TV, WABC-TV, NBC New York NY Nightly News with Chuck Scarborough, and WPIX Morning News. He also provides commentary on CNN Radio, NPR, and KID (AM) News Radio. During 2011, he hosted a political talk show "Center Forward with Jamie Chandler" on LA Talk Radio.

Chandler's political commentary has been published by the Associated Press, Atlanta Journal-Constitution, Bloomberg, Boston Globe, Chicago Tribune, CNN, Daily Mail, Daily News (New York), Financial Times, Houston Chronicle, Huffington Post, International Business Times, NBC News, Newsday, The New York Times, Reuters, San Francisco Chronicle, Talking Points Memo, The Daily Beast, The Palm Beach Post, The Washington Post, Washington Times, Washington Examiner, USA Today, and Yahoo News.

He has written columns for U.S. News & World Report, Politico, and International Business Times. During the 2012 Election season, he blogged for the Daily News (New York). In February 2013 he began writing for Thomas Jefferson Street, U.S. News & World Report's political opinion blog.

== Research ==
Chandler has published several papers on forecasting elections, political history, and survey research. Between 2007 and 2009 he was a visiting fellow at the Applied Statistics Center at Columbia University studying under Statistician Andrew Gelman.

== Works ==
- Kastellec, Jonathan P.; Gelman, Andrew; Chandler, Jamie P. (2008). "The Playing Field Shifts: Predicting the Seats-Votes Curve in the 2008 U.S. House Elections" (PDF). PS: Political Science & Politics. 41 (4): 729–732. doi:10.1017/S1049096508081201. ISSN 1049-0965.
- Kastellec, Jonathan P.; Gelman, Andrew; Chandler, Jamie P. (2008). "Predicting and Dissecting the Seats-Votes Curve in the 2006 U.S. House Election" (PDF). PS: Political Science & Politics. 41 (1): 139–145. doi:10.1017/S1049096508080207. ISSN 1049-0965.

== Education ==
After studying at Plymouth North High School he graduated with honors from Harvard College, and pursued doctoral studies in political science at Graduate Center of the City University of New York.

== Political views and influence ==
Chandler is a centrist, non partisan political analyst. He is a strong advocate for reasoned government and responsive politics, and gives much attention to income inequality, civil and minority rights. In 2013, he and journalist Palmer Gibbs published a column in the New York Times on the ethics of the major credit card companies doing business with hates groups. The piece went on to influence MasterCard to drop several anti-Semitic, Holocaust denial organizations from its payment processing network.

== Entertainment and documentaries ==
Chandler has made a number of factual television appearances and produced a short documentary in 2011 The Faces of Occupy Wall Street. In February 2012 he appeared in USA Networks "Characters Unite" campaign. He also appeared on mtvU's Professors Strike Back in September 2012 in the episode "Professor is 'Hot for his Age'."
