= Dartball =

Darts game variation

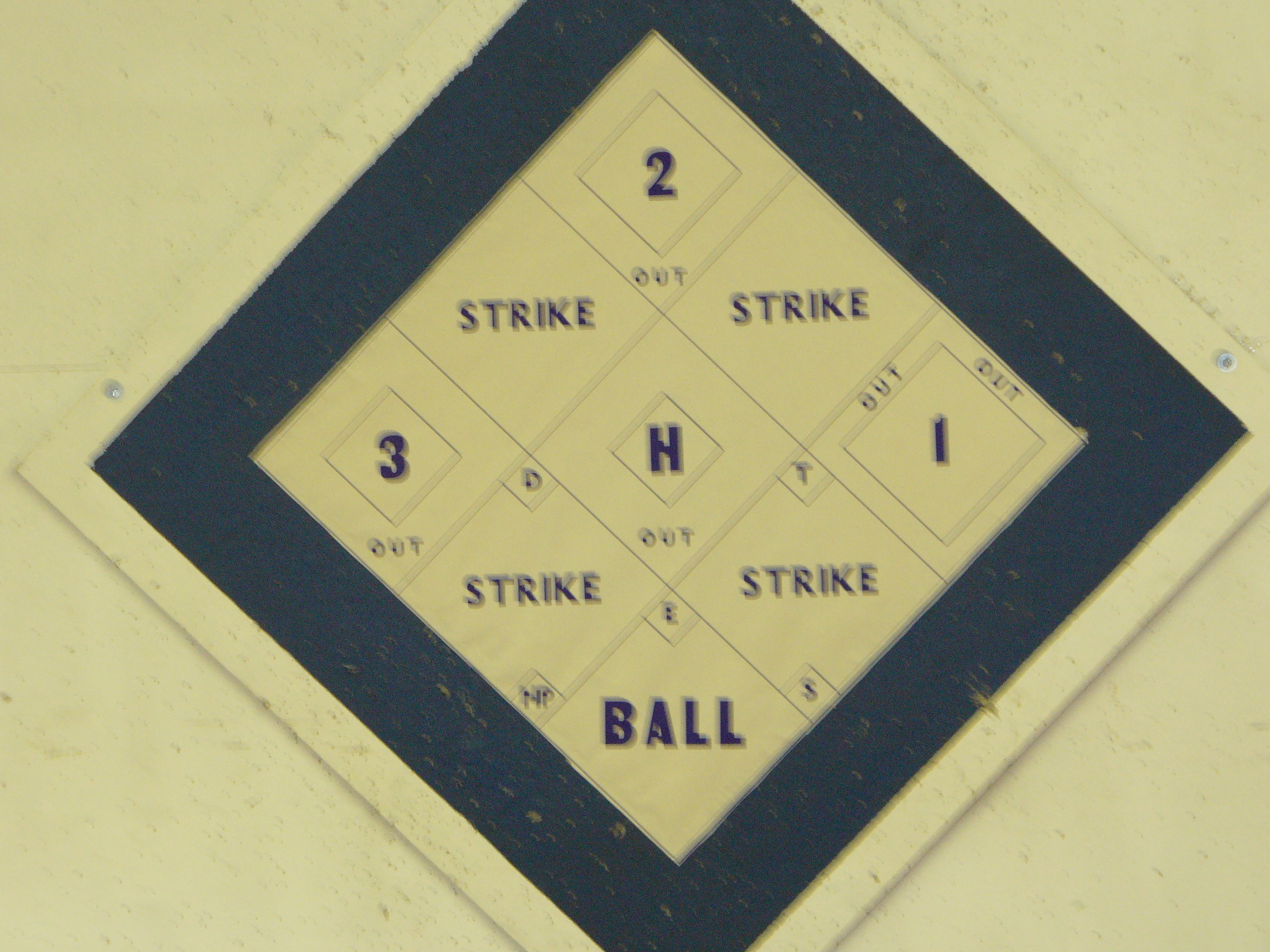
A typical dartball diamond used by church leagues in northwest Ohio.

Dartball is a game in which darts are thrown at a large wooden or Homasote board that resembles a baseball field with colored areas which denote bases. Dartball uses baseball-like rules and scoring.

Dartball rules and board configurations vary from league to league, but generally teams comprise either seven or nine players plus possible alternates. Dartball teams are usually formed by churches, often playing their games during fall and winter months in church basements or common areas. Most leagues end their seasons with championship tournaments held at local high school gymnasiums.

Dartball games can be very competitive; just as in baseball, the opposing team and its supporters may attempt to distract the "batter." In each match played there are three individual nine-inning games, with the exception of tie games in which extra inning games will be played. In some leagues, in order for a team to record a win, they must win at least two out of the three individual games. In other leagues, each win or loss in an evening's match is counted in the team's season standings.

== History ==
The first Dartball board was introduced by the Apex company in 1923. The game travelled quickly with Dartball Leagues established as early as 1928 (Mon Yough Church Dartball League). It is reported by the president of Apex that "the sport of Dartball was spread around the country by Johnny Appleseed types, such as Lutheran ministers who would bring their dartboards and their bibles as they moved from one congregation to the next." On March 31, 1941 Life magazine ran a story on Dartball citing Philadelphia, Kansas City and Milwaukee as strongholds of the sport.

== Darts and dartboards ==
A complex board diagram.

The darts used for dartball are different from the typical pub game darts, and are made of wood with real feathers and metal tips. Most church leagues use Apex #2 tournament darts.

Most boards consist of a four-base diamond: first, second, third, and home plate. Additional areas are marked as strike, out, ball, error, sacrifice, double play, triple play and hit-by-pitch. The home run tends to be in the very center of the board. The diamond is surrounded by a six-inch foul line border. The entire playing field is 42 inches squared including foul territory.

Some boards are more complex and consist of out, single, ball, strike, double play, triple play, stolen base, runner off first, runner off base, sacrifice, balk, home run, and walk space(s) around the four-base diamond: first, second, third, and home plate. The home run tends to be in the very center of the board and is a circular space with a diameter of around two and a half inches. The home run is surrounded by three singles (1), two outs, two strikes, and one ball (B) that form a square around the home run. This is where the player wants their dart to be hitting consistently, unless they have skill enough to throw for the 2 bagger or 3 bagger.

== Rules ==
The player throwing the darts is the "batter". Each dart thrown is the same as a pitch in baseball. Darts may be thrown overhanded, underhanded or both depending on league rules. Players throw darts towards the playing field from the pitcher's line at a distance of 25 feet. Where the dart lands on the board determines the outcome of each pitch. The batter continues to throw darts, or bat, until they are safe or out, just like in baseball.

A batter is considered safe if his or her dart lands on first, second, or third base or by any combination of plays that put him safely "on base."

A run is scored when a player advances safely around first, second and third base and returns safely to home plate. A player may score by hitting a home run or by any combination of plays, after he is "on base" (first, second, or third base) by subsequent batters getting either base hits or home runs that brings him home.

A player who advances around all of the bases to score is credited with a run (R). While runs scored are considered an important batting statistic, it is regarded as less important than runs batted in (RBIs).

Once the player has concluded his or her turn at bat, the next players on the team follow suit until the team makes three outs. Then the other team has its turn up to bat.

The game concludes at the end of nine innings with the team scoring the most runs winning the game.

== Variants ==
Another form of baseball, played on a regular dart board, is called baseball darts.

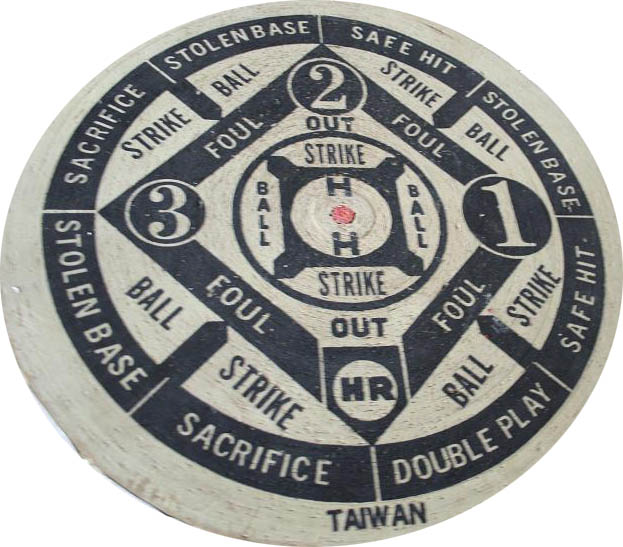
Baseball Darts.

"Baseball Darts" is also the name of a game played on a different type of specialized dartboard. Games are played with either two or four players. If it is between two players, they play head-to-head. If it is four, the teams of pairs play against each other. The baseball dart board is designed just like a baseball diamond. There are several sections: Strike, Ball, Hit, Foul, Out, Sacrifice, Stolen Base, Single, Double and Triple. The center red dot is an automatic three outs and the surrounding area is an automatic hit. Four balls means a walk and three strikes means an out. The count is reset any time the dart lands on another area such as Hit, Double or Home run. A player's turn is over if they make three outs. If a dart misses the board, it is considered a foul. Just like real baseball, fouls are considered strikes, but they cannot strike out a player. When playing with two players, each player gets to throw five darts or they get out, whichever comes first.
