= Matthew Chandler =

Matthew or Matt Chandler may refer to:

- Matt Chandler (pastor) (born 1974), Southern Baptist pastor
- Matt Chandler (writer) (born 1972), American author
- Matthew Chandler (soccer) (born 2000), Canadian soccer player
