= Chandler Scientific School =

Former school at Dartmouth College

Abiel Chandler School of Science and the Arts was established in 1852 by Abiel Chandler, a Boston commission merchant and New Hampshire native. The school was as a separate undergraduate college at Dartmouth College comparable to the earlier Lawrence Scientific School (1847) at Harvard University and the later Sheffield Scientific School (1854) at Yale University.

Chandler students established their own fraternities: Phi Zeta Mu (later Eta Eta chapter of Sigma Chi, now The Tabard) and Sigma Delta Pi (later Beta Theta Pi); sat in their own pews for morning services in the Old Chapel in Dartmouth Hall; and had their own sports teams. Classes took place in Chandler Hall, which stood between Parkhurst Hall and the Blunt Alumni Center. The building, built by Moor's Charity School in 1835 and designed by Ammi B. Young, was remodeled with a Mansard roof by Chandler mathematics professor Frank Asbury Sherman in 1871 and received a rear addition in 1898, designed by Charles Alonzo Rich, a Chandler graduate of 1876 and designing partner of the New York architects Lamb & Rich.

Dartmouth absorbed the Chandler Scientific School in 1893 and continued as the Departments of Zoology, Botany, and Geology. The Chandler Fund continues to be administered by appointed Visitors and was valued at about $1.3 million in 2000.
