= Michael Chandler (disambiguation) =

Michael Chandler (born 1986) is an American mixed martial artist.

Michael Chandler may also refer to:

- Michael Chandler (priest) (born 1945), British priest
- Michael A. Chandler, American film editor, writer and director
- Mike Chandler (born 1958), American racing driver
