= List of College of Wooster fraternities and sororities =

This article provides a list of College of Wooster fraternities and sororities. Greek letter organizations have had a long history at the College of Wooster, dating to 1871, five years after the founding of the school. These emerged as chapters of national fraternities until their ban in 1913, at which time they adjusted into local chapters, sometimes called "sections" or "clubs" which were Greek in all but name. At times they have included the majority of the student body, while at present, social chapters represent about fifteen percent of students, with many additional students being admitted to various honor societies.

Social, professional, and honor societies are listed below, after a short historical summary.

== Formation ==
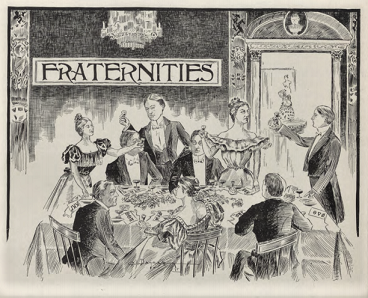
Wooster fraternities began as dining clubs

The pioneer chapters of the national fraternities were established at what was then called the University of Wooster, now the College of Wooster in 1871 and 1872, only five years after the establishment of the school. Formed originally as dining groups that shared the cost and responsibility of meals, beginning in 1870 they began to coalesce into a system of nearly a dozen fraternities and sororities by the turn of the century. As an example of the age of the Wooster Greek system, national fraternity Sigma Chi had placed its Beta chapter at the College of Wooster.

For purposes of this article the terms "Fraternity" and "Sorority" are used somewhat interchangeably, with men's and co-ed groups always using Fraternity, and women's groups using either Fraternity or Sorority. For convenience, the term "Greek Letter Society" is a generic substitute. The word, "Greek," in this case refers to the use of Greek Letters for each society's name, and not to Greek ethnicity.

Fraternal connections were not limited to just undergraduates: Early professors and administrators deemed their undergraduate fraternity membership(s) significant enough to list in their short biographies in the annual Wooster Index yearbooks. In the 1897 yearbook, fully half of the professors and instructors listed their affiliation, including Dr. Sylvester F. Scovel, third president of the college, and a member of Beta Theta Pi, College Vice President Dr. Samuel J Kirkwood, also a member of Beta Theta Pi, and Mrs. Minne Carrothers McDonald, a member of Kappa Kappa Gamma sorority. Of 21 faculty members with biographies, thirteen were listed with Greek affiliation. During this era, sponsorship by prominent local alumni or professors was a common spark to the establishment of new undergraduate chapters. Other yearbook pages, naming members of each chapter would list these separately, sometimes under Latin headings as either "Fraters in Facultate" (Faculty) or "Fraters in Urbe" (Town) for local alumni. In the 1897 yearbook Kappa Kappa Gamma alone listed fifteen alumnae in the local Wooster area. "Fraters in Universitate" (Undergraduates) were listed by class year.

Similar expansion of fraternal groups was sweeping through other Ohio institutions, as old-line Eastern fraternities gazed westward. But about the time Wooster was established a juncture had been reached where a burst of anti-secret society fervor had trimmed somewhat what until then had been full-throated support of such civic groups at both the adult and collegiate level. In this era, all fraternities were affected by increased scrutiny. Thus, this was the backdrop philosophical tussle when the college was established.

Following the trend at other institutions, and with administrative approval, several of the fraternities at Wooster had bought property and embarked on building their first houses within a decade of formation.

Fraternities were engaged in campus improvement. They aided in the construction of the school's tennis courts in 1888, and in 1890 "contributed in a small way to the construction of wings on Old Main." A crisis for the Wooster Greeks occurred in 1893, where a "large proportion" of the student body left the school, never to return, over a fractious conflict where the faculty wished to deemphasize athletics. This led to the closure of four fraternities due to low manpower. Three of these chapters were re-established within a few years. As early as 1899 faculty and administration began to object to fraternities as "excuses for smoking, drinking, and dancing." Some objection in those early days came on the complaint of non-aligned students, a majority of the campus, who felt they could not get elected to any campus office without belonging to a strong fraternity.

What became an upperclassman dorm, Kenarden Lodge, was built in 1911. Its gabled "Sections" would become, by 1918, the perennial homes of many of the school's Greek chapters.

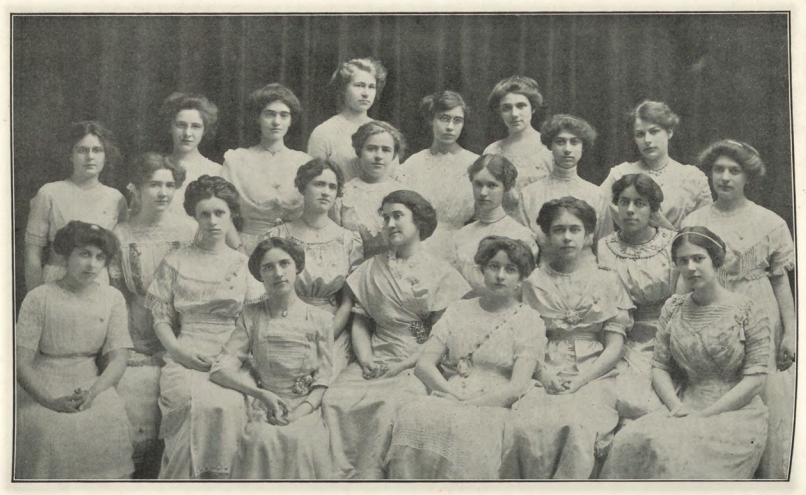
Tri-Delt's Delta Delta chapter in 1912, photographed approximately six months before learning their organization would be banned.

== 1913 ban ==
A larger, existential crisis for the Wooster Greeks ensued when, in the fall of 1912, the Trustees were lobbied to close its then 40-year old Greek system.

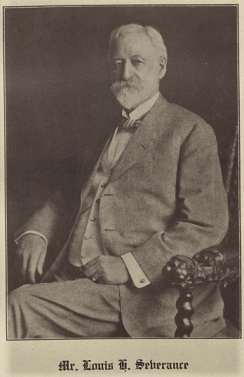
Louis H. Severance, President of the College of Wooster Board of Trustees, 1913

L. H. Severance, then-President of the Board of Trustees and namesake of academic building Severance Hall, was considered to be "an important donor" during his tenure. He was approached to support a building campaign, but rebuffed the attempt. Severance was virulently anti-Greek, and asserted he "would give no more to Wooster while fraternities remained because he was convinced that they [were] inimical to the best interests of the college." The Trustees at the time, on a narrow, contested vote, elected to disband the fraternities as of February 13, 1913; three of the trustees resigned to express their disapproval over the decision. News spread quickly among the chapters that no further initiations were to be allowed from that point. Two sororities organized an overnight ceremony prior to "officially" hearing the news the following morning. One fraternity, Alpha Tau Omega, noted a year later in an edition of The Palm, "[...But,] shortly after the passage of the resolution abolishing fraternities Mr. Severance died. He left no will and had not entered into any legal obligation binding upon his heirs or estate."—Thus in spite of the closure of all campus Greek chapters, no donation from Severance for Wooster's capital campaign was ever received. Some hoped that "the odious ruling" would be rescinded, but that did not occur. The discouraged national chapters devolved into local organizations or disbanded, with the last few national Greek members graduating in 1918.

=== Response to the ban ===
College yearbooks, called the Wooster Index, now available online, printed multiple pages for each Greek organization from the 1870s through 1914. In the 1915 yearbook these pages abruptly disappeared, with that same edition eulogizing Severance. By 1916 and '17 the only mention of Greeks in the yearbooks were graduating seniors who listed their affiliation. It would be decades before Greek affiliations were once again noted in these books, although many of the now-local chapters survived through this period, continuing to function as fraternities and sororities of sorts, only without letters. Upon moving into Kenarden Lodge in 1918, the groups began to call themselves by numbers, usually in Roman numeral fashion. Soon these groups took on new Greek letters as well. As each fraternity lived in a section of Kenarden, the groups adopted this terminology and began to call themselves Sections. The sororities opted to call themselves Clubs. Thus the transition into local chapters was not immediate, but there was legacy continuity:

National fraternities → Numbered groups → Numbered "Sections" at Kenarden → Adoption of Greek letters, as locals → Expansion beyond Kenarden

At the same time the General, or Social chapters were adjusting to their new names, a number of Honor societies began to appear on campus, the earliest of these tapping their first members in the 1920s.

By the 1940s, each of Kenarden's 7 men's sections had a perennial group of its own, and there were at least 9 sections on campus by the 1950s, as well as several clubs. To cope with this expansion, which according to the Wooster Voice included 99% of men on campus from 1953 to 1957, the college built three new dorms, Armington Hall, which housed sections I-III, Stevenson Hall, which housed sections IV-V, and Bissman Hall, which housed sections VI-VIII. The traditional Section names stuck with each group regardless of their residence. Yearbooks remain the best source to trace whether specific local chapters are the direct descendants of these original national chapters.

While the fraternal impetus continued into the modern era, student organizers experienced occasional waves of suppression bracketed by other times of a more liberal, hands-off approach. There was little anti-Greek pressure during the immediate post-WWII period, where the majority of men were participants. During other times Greek-related information was suppressed, but apparently the de facto Greek nature of the various Sections remained widely known.

Inventive students sought ways to identify Greek letters in the yearbook with their corresponding sections.

It is clear that five long-tenured fraternity chapters, at least, had their origin in earlier groups. The fraternity Beta Theta Pi's local Alpha Lambda chapter quickly evolved into a men's local called Beta Kappa Phi in the First (I) Section of Kenarden Lodge in 1914. It was also the first of the sections of Kenarden to wear and affiliate themselves with Greek letters, despite the college's objections. Recently disbanded fraternity, Phi Omega Sigma (1913-2017) drew its members from the original Delta Tau Delta chapter, and re-formed as a local, traditionally the Fourth (VI) Section. Recently disbanded fraternity Phi Delta Sigma (2013-2005) drew its members from the original Phi Delta Theta, also known as the Fifth (V) Section. Phi Sigma Alpha formed in 1916 as the Sixth (VI) Section, but it is unclear whether it had a previous affiliation. Dormant Kappa Chi fraternity (1965-2005) was renamed from an earlier local called Kappa Kappa Kappa, which itself originated in the Beta chapter of Sigma Chi national fraternity. It was known as the Seventh (VII) Section. Dormant Omega Alpha Tau (1976-1995) can also claim roots in Sigma Chi and the Seventh (VII) Section, having split from Kappa Chi.

Three of today's campus sororities can claim their provenance in the earlier chapter of Kappa Kappa Gamma. Local Pi Kappa is the first direct descendant of this group, at one point called Eighth (VIII) Section, but more commonly a Club. In 1943 the founders of Epsilon Kappa Omicron broke away from Pi Kappa to form their own sorority. Finally, six Pi Kappa pledges broke away in 1983 to form Alpha Gamma Phi sorority. The successors of the first national sorority on campus, Kappa Alpha Theta, formed local sorority the Imps (1913-1938), which in 1938 became Zeta Phi Gamma. The successors of Delta Delta Delta formed local sorority Delta Delta Rho, informally known as the Pyramids. The most common residence for sororities has been Bissman Hall.

== Continuation as local organizations ==
Thus during subsequent years, fraternities and sororities have remained popular with students. Some thrived in spite of occasional efforts by faculty to limit them or ban their existence. Others have failed, due to unchecked behavioral excesses. The "local model" by its nature inserted the faculty and Trustees as overseers of the chapters, sometimes with heightened levels of concern: While the requirement that chapters abandon national identities allowed exclusive administrative control (i.e.: by collegiate administrators), the benefits touted by national organizations become therefore inaccessible: leadership and peer training from outside the college, broader (nationalized) risk management training, reduced group insurance costs, centrally managed communication with chapter alumni, national career networking and additional layers of alumni and national oversight. Even so, the local model has continued since 1913.

The State of Ohio increased its scrutiny over hazing allegations at state institutions when hazing was first made a state crime in 1983. During the following decade "the school's longstanding policy of don't ask-don't tell evolved into a crackdown of hazing activities."

In 1991, two Wooster chapters were cited for hazing, in decisions that were later reversed by the Judicial Board due to lack of evidence, but heightened scrutiny remained, and some closures were forced. A 1991 Trustees statement reaffirmed the ban on national groups, but offered support for the clubs and sections, officially allowing them to refer to themselves with Greek letters. In early 2006, Dean of Students Kurt Holmes proposed bringing in national fraternities again to alleviate many perceived problems with the local model, but this proposal was never acted upon.

Through these challenges, the organizations have survived, with approximately 15% of the student body as members as of 2019, per the Inter-Greek Council.

== General, academic and social fraternities and sororities ==
There are presently twelve active social/academic Greek groups at the College of Wooster. These include six sororities (sometimes called clubs), five fraternities (sometimes called sections) and one co-educational group. The clubs and sections terminology resulted in the adjustment from national affiliation; these groups now use the terms 'fraternity' and 'sorority' interchangeably, as well as Greek letters. These groups remain unaffiliated with national Greek organizations. Approximately fifteen percent of the student body participates in these groups. Wooster's Greek chapters are self-governed under an Inter-Greek Council. Active chapters are listed in bold, inactive chapters are listed in italics. Noted by date of founding, chapters include:

(NIC) indicates members of the North American Interfraternity Conference.
(PFA) indicates members of the Professional Fraternity Association.
(FFC) indicates members of the Fraternity Forward Coalition.
(NPC) indicates members of the National Panhellenic Conference.

=== Men's Fraternities ===
**Active academic and social fraternities**

- **ΒΚΦ** - Beta Kappa Phi, 1914 (local), First (I) Section
- **ΦΣΑ** - Phi Sigma Alpha, 1916 (local), Sixth (VI) Section
- **MOH** - Men of Harambee, 1989 (local), New Eighth (VIII) Section
- **ΞΧΨ** - Xi Chi Psi, 1991 (local)
- **ΔΧΔ** - Delta Chi Delta, 2017 (local)

**Fraternities whose names changed**

ΒΘΠ - Beta Theta Pi, 1872-1895, 1896-1913 (NIC), became **ΒΚΦ**
ΦΔΘ - Phi Delta Theta, 1872-1899 (FFC), became ΦΔΣ
ΣΧ - Sigma Chi, 1872-1893, 1899-1913 (NIC), became ΚΚΚ (see ΚΧ, ΩΑΤ)
ΔΤΔ - Delta Tau Delta, 1880-1894, 1910-1913 (NIC), became ΦΩΣ
ΨΔΥ - Psi Delta Upsilon (local), 1908-1911, became ΔΤΔ
ΘΔΣ - Theta Delta Sigma (local), 1910-1912, became ΣΦΕ
ΚΚΚ - Kappa Kappa Kappa (local), Seventh (VII) Section, 1913-~1965, became ΚΧ
ΚΧ - Kappa Chi (local), Seventh (VII) Section, ~1965-2005, dormant; (later faction split to become ΩΑΤ)

**Dormant academic and social fraternities**

ΦΚΨ - Phi Kappa Psi, 1871-1892 (NIC), dormant
S.D.P. - Sigma Delta Pi, 1873–1877, dormant
ΦΓΔ - Phi Gamma Delta, 1882-1913 (NIC), dormant
ΣΔΠ - Sigma Delta Pi (Vitruvian), 1873-1877, dormant
ΑΤΩ - Alpha Tau Omega, 1888-1914 (NIC and FFC), dormant
ΘΝΕ - Theta Nu Epsilon, 1891-1923, dormant
ΣΦΕ - Sigma Phi Epsilon, 1912-1914 (formerly NIC), dormant
ΦΩΣ - Phi Omega Sigma (local), 1913-2017, Fourth (IV) Section, dormant
ΦΔΣ - Phi Delta Sigma (local), 1913-2005, Fifth (V) Section, dormant
Rabbis (local), ~1913-1970s?, Third (III) Section, dormant
ΙΧ - Iota Chi (local), ~1913-1950, Ninth (IX) Section, dormant
ΞΕΤ - Xi Epsilon Tau (local), pre-1937-19xx?, dormant
ΑΓΕ - Alpha Gamma Epsilon (local), Original Eighth (VIII) Section, 1937-19xx, dormant
Inky (local), Eleventh (XI) Section, 1940-19xx, dormant
ΩΑΤ - Omega Alpha Tau (local), 1976-1995?, Seventh (VII) Section, dormant

=== Co-ed general fraternities ===
- **ΗΠ** - Eta Pi, 2011 (local)

**Dormant co-ed general fraternities**

ΚΦΣ - Kappa Phi Sigma (local), 1922-2005, Second (II) Section, dormant

=== Women's Sororities ===
**Active academic and social sororities**

- **ΠΚ** - Pi Kappa (local), 1918, "Peanuts"
- **ΖΦΓ** - Zeta Phi Gamma (local), 1928-19xx, 1988, "Imps"
- **ΚΕΖ** - Kappa Epsilon Zeta (local), 1943-~1980, 2013, "Keys"
- **ΕΚΟ** - Epsilon Kappa Omicron (local), 1943, "Echo"
- **ΑΓΦ** - Alpha Gamma Phi (local), 1983, "Alpha Gamm"
- **ΔΘΨ** - Delta Theta Psi (local), 1992, "Theta"

**Sororities whose names changed**

ΚΑΘ - Kappa Alpha Theta, 1875-1913 (NPC), became Imps (see **ΖΦΓ**)
ΚΚΓ - Kappa Kappa Gamma, 1876-1914 (NPC), became **ΠΚ**, **ΕΚΟ**, and **ΑΓΦ**
ΑΔΨ - Alpha Delta Psi (local), 1908-1910, became ΠΒΦ
ΔΣΝ - Delta Sigma Nu (local), 1910-1912, became ΔΔΔ
ΔΔΔ - Delta Delta Delta, 1912-1913 (NPC), became ΔΔΡ
Imps (local), 1913-1928, became **ΖΦΓ**
Darts (local), 1943-1949, became Keys (see **ΚΕΖ**)
Arrows (local), 1943-1949, became Keys (see **ΚΕΖ**)

**Dormant academic and social sororities**

ΠΒΦ - Pi Beta Phi, 1910-1913 (NPC), dormant
ΔΔΓ - Delta Delta Gamma (local), (typo; see ΔΔΡ)
ΛΑΣ - Lambda Alpha Sigma, "Sphinx" (local), ~1914-1975?, dormant
ΔΔΡ - Delta Delta Rho, "Pyramids" (local), 1924-1975?, dormant
Natives (local), pre-1935-19xx, dormant
ΧΑΧ - Chi Alpha Chi, "Trumps" (local), 1940-1950+, dormant
ΦΕΑ - Phi Epsilon Alpha, "Dominoes" (local), 1940-19xx, dormant
Jacks (local), 1943-1944, dormant
Pipers (local), 1943-1944, dormant
ΣΦΔ - Sigma Phi Delta, "Spuds" (local), 1943-1950+, dormant
Jinx (local), 1944-1947, dormant
ΧΩΨ - Chi Omega Psi (local), 1976-1993+?, dormant
ΔΦΑ - Delta Phi Alpha (local), 1989-2006, 2008-2014+, dormant?

== Honor and professional fraternities ==
Graduates indicate honor society membership by multi-colored tassels, cords and stoles at commencement ceremonies.

The emergence and continuation of honor societies on the campus has proceeded without similar interruption nor controversy. Wooster's first honor societies were formed in the early 1920s when in quick succession a chapter of Delta Sigma Rho was placed at the school to recognize top students in debate, followed by the Spanish language and culture honorary, Sigma Delta Pi. These were soon joined by the oldest of the honor societies, venerable Phi Beta Kappa, which placed its Kappa of Ohio chapter at the campus in 1926. Most of these societies continue operation.

Unlike the general fraternities, an honor society requires a faculty sponsor; those that go dormant are easily re-established with the support of an engaged advisor. In the modern era, Honor societies are co-educational. Students who are elected to membership in an honor society may wear the society's colors with their graduation regalia.

Seizing a middle ground between honor societies and general fraternities, professional fraternities exist to promote scholarship and networking among students of a particular field. The sole professional fraternity on the campus is now dormant. On other campuses, these may be residential. Professional fraternities are generally co-educational, limiting their membership to specific fields, or a small inter-related group of fields, like STEM, or "medical fields" or all types of engineering. They are self-governing. Chapter information for honor and professional fraternities from Baird's Manual, the Wooster website's list of student organizations, or departmental websites.

Active chapters listed in bold, inactive chapters listed in italics.
(ACHS) indicates members of the Association of College Honor Societies.
(PFA) indicates members of the Professional Fraternity Association.

=== Honor societies ===
- **ΔΣΡ-ΤΚΑ** - Delta Sigma Rho-Tau Kappa Alpha, 1922 (ACHS), honors, debate
- **ΣΔΠ** - Sigma Delta Pi, 1924 (ACHS), honors, Spanish
- **ΦΒΚ** - Phi Beta Kappa, 1926 (formerly ACHS), honors, scholarship
- **ΦΑΘ** - Phi Alpha Theta, 1926 (ACHS), honors, history
- **ΦΣΙ** - Phi Sigma Iota, 1926 (ACHS), honors, foreign language, literature, classics
- **ΗΣΠ** - Eta Sigma Phi, 1934, honors, Greek and Latin classics
- **ΔΦΑ** - Delta Phi Alpha, 1939, honors, German
- **ΣΤΔ** - Sigma Tau Delta, 1940 (ACHS), honors, English
- **ΠΚΛ** - Pi Kappa Lambda, 1941 (ACHS), honors, music
- **ΦΣΙ** - Pi Sigma Alpha, 1947 (ACHS), honors, political science
- **National Collegiate Players**, 1948 (formerly ACHS), honors, theater
- **ΟΔΕ** - Omicron Delta Epsilon, 1982 (ACHS), honors, economics
- **ΦΣΙ** - Phi Sigma Tau, 1983 (ACHS), honors, philosophy
- **ΛΠΗ** - Lambda Pi Eta, <1992? (ACHS), honors, communications
- **ΒΒΒ** - Beta Beta Beta, 1998 (ACHS), honors, biology
- **ΑΨΩ** - Alpha Psi Omega, 2014, honors, collegiate performance and technical arts
- **ΚΔΠ** - Kappa Delta Pi, 2015 (formerly ACHS), honors, education
- **ΝΡΨ** - Nu Rho Psi, 2016, honors, neuroscience

**Dormant honor societies**

ΑΒΦ - Alpha Beta Phi (local), 1894-1896, men's honors, inter-fraternal, became ΒΔΒ
ΒΔΒ - Beta Delta Beta, 1896-1913+, men's honors, interfraternal, dormant
ΜΑΦ - Mu Alpha Phi (local), 1896-1902?, women's honors, inter-fraternal, dormant
ΑΔΧ - Alpha Delta Chi (local), 1901-1904?, men's honors, inter-fraternal, dormant
ΑΔΩ - Alpha Delta Omega (local), 1916-1928+, honors, collegiate honor and friendship
ΚΘΓ - Kappa Theta Gamma (local), 1929-1950+, honors, drama, dormant
ΘΧΔ - Theta Chi Delta, 1920-1950+, honors, chemistry, dormant
ΣΠΣ - Sigma Pi Sigma, 1930-1943 (ACHS), honors, physics, dormant
ΚΜΕ - Kappa Mu Epsilon, 1941-1954 (ACHS), honors, math, dormant

=== Professional fraternities (all dormant) ===
ΚΦΚ - Kappa Phi Kappa, 1930-1939 (PFA), men's teaching professions, became **ΣΤΔ**
ΕΡ - Epsilon Rho (local?), pre-1940-19xx, teaching professions, dormant

== See also ==
College of Wooster, Clubs & Organizations
