= Alfred Chandler =

Alfred Chandler may refer to:

- Alfred Thomas Chandler (1852–1941), Australian newspaper editor
- Alfred Chandler (politician) (1873–1935), Australian politician
- Alfred D. Chandler Jr. (1918–2007), American business historian
- Alfred W. Chandler (1890–1978), United States Navy admiral
