= Admiral Chandler =

Admiral Chandler may refer to:

- Alfred W. Chandler (1890–1978), U.S. Navy rear admiral
- Alvin Duke Chandler (1902–1987), U.S. Navy vice admiral
- Ralph Chandler (1829–1889), U.S. Navy rear admiral
- Theodore E. Chandler (1894–1945), U.S. Navy rear admiral
