= Chandler Huntington =

American politician

Member of the Washington House of Representatives
- In office 1889–1891

Personal details
- Born: February 24, 1849 Multnomah County, Oregon, United States
- Died: September 17, 1921 (aged 72) Cowlitz County, Washington, United States
- Party: Republican

Chandler Huntington (February 24, 1849 – September 17, 1921) was an American politician in the state of Washington. He served in the Washington House of Representatives from 1889 to 1891.
