= Chandler Quarles =

American Christian musician (born 1990)

- Also known as: Chandler Quarles
- Born: Chandler Elizabeth Quarles; July 24, 1990 (age 35); Conroe, Texas
- Origin: Houston, Texas
- Genres: Worship, Christian pop
- Occupations: Singer, songwriter
- Instrument: vocals
- Years active: 2012–present
- Website: chandlerroberts.com

Chandler Elizabeth Quarles (née, Roberts; born July 24, 1990) is an American Christian musician, who plays Christian pop style of contemporary worship music. She has released two independently-made extended plays, Art from the Ashes (2012) and The Color EP (2016).

== Early life and education ==
Chandler Elizabeth Roberts was born on July 24, 1990, in Conroe, Texas, the daughter of Robert Lee and Susan Elizabeth Roberts (née, Beams), while she was raised in nearby Houston, Texas, with her two younger sisters. She graduated from high school in her hometown in 2008, soon thereafter relocating to Nashville, Tennessee to attend Belmont University, where she graduated with her baccalaureate in commercial voice in 2012.

== Career ==
She started her music recording career in 2012, by releasing the extended play, Art from the Ashes, on February 14, 2012. Her subsequent extended play, The Color EP, was released on February 26, 2016.

== Personal life ==
Roberts works for Fair Trade Services, where she is their national promotions manager.

== Discography ==
=== Extended plays ===
- Art from the Ashes (2012)
- The Color EP (2016)
