= James Chandler =

James Chandler may refer to:

- James Chandler (academic) (born 1948), American professor
- James B. Chandler (1837–1899), American sailor
- James Gilbert Chandler (1856–1924), American architect
- James Watson Chandler (1801–1870), Canadian politician
