= Jeff Chandler (disambiguation) =

Jeff Chandler (1918–1961) was an American actor and singer.

Jeff Chandler may also refer to:

- Jeff Chandler (boxer) (born 1956), former American boxer
- Jeff Chandler (American football) (born 1979), former American football player
- Jeff Chandler (footballer, born 1959), English-born former Irish footballer
- Jeff Chandler (Australian footballer) (born 1966), Australian football player
