= Bert Chandler (footballer, born 1897) =

English footballer

Personal information
- Full name: Albert Chandler
- Date of birth: 15 January 1897
- Place of birth: Carlisle, England
- Date of death: 28 January 1963 (aged 66)
- Place of death: Carlisle, England
- Height: 5 ft 10 1/2 in (1.79 m)
- Position: Right back

Senior career*
Years	Team	Apps	(Gls)
- Dalston Beach Reds
- Carlisle United
1919–1925	Derby County	169	(0)
1925–1926	Newcastle United	33	(0)
1926–1928	Sheffield United	70	(0)
- Mansfield Town
- Northfleet
- Manchester Central
- Holme Head
1933–1934	Queen of the South	1	(0)
- * Club domestic league appearances and goals

Albert Chandler (15 January 1897 – 28 January 1963) was an English professional footballer who made over 160 appearances as a right back in the Football League for Derby County.

== Personal life ==
Chandler served in the Border Regiment and the Machine Gun Corps during the First World War.

== Career statistics ==
Appearances and goals by club, season and competition
Club	Season	League			National cup (Note: Includes FA Cup, Scottish Cup)		Total	
Club	Season	Division	Apps	Goals	Apps	Goals	Apps	Goals
Derby County	1919–20	First Division	11	0	2	0	13	0
Derby County	1920–21	First Division	10	0	0	0	10	0
Derby County	1921–22	Second Division	42	0	1	0	43	0
Derby County	1922–23	Second Division	37	0	5	0	42	0
Derby County	1923–24	Second Division	31	0	5	0	36	0
Derby County	1924–25	Second Division	38	0	1	0	39	0
Derby County	Total		169	0	14	0	183	0
Newcastle United	1925–26	First Division	29	0	3	0	32	0
Newcastle United	1926–27	First Division	4	0	0	0	4	0
Newcastle United	Total		33	0	3	0	36	0
Queen of the South	1933–34	Scottish First Division	1	0	0	0	1	0
Career total			203	0	17	0	220	0
