= Martin Spencer Chandler =

American businessman and politician (1824–1893)

Martin Spencer Chandler (February 14, 1824 – February 24, 1893) was an American businessman, farmer, and politician.

Chandler was born in Jamestown, Chautauqua County, New York. He went to Fredonia Academy and to Jamestown Academy for elementary school. Chandler moved to Minnesota with his wife and family in 1856 and settled in Red Wing, Goodhue County, Minnesota. He was a farmer and a tanner/currier. Chandler served was the United States Surveyor General for Minnesota. He served on the Goodhue County Commission and as the Goodhue County Sheriff. Chandler served in the Minnesota Senate in 1883 and 1884 and was a Republican.
