= Stephen Chandler =

Stephen Chandler may refer to:

- Stephen Sanders Chandler Jr. (1899–1989), American judge
- Stephen E. Chandler (1841–1919), American Civil War soldier and Medal of Honor recipient
