= Andrea Chandler =

American farmer, writer and sailor

- Allegiance: United States
- Branch: US Navy
- Service years: 1998-2008
- Conflicts: Operation Iraqi Freedom
- Awards: Navy Achievement Medal
- Other work: farmer
- Website: Manor of Mixed Blessings

Andrea Chandler is an American farmer, writer, and retired sailor. After enlisting in the United States Navy in 1998, Chandler worked as a guided missile specialist on various destroyers, serving in Operation Iraqi Freedom, for which they were awarded the Navy Achievement Medal. Retiring in 2008, they worked on missile systems at a defense contractor before switching to small-scale agriculture, their interest spurred by 4 chickens they had been given as a wedding gift.

As a farmer and science communicator, Chandler has worked with The Livestock Conservancy and been covered in The Independent and The Piedmont Virginian. As a Navy veteran and commentator on veterans' issues, they have been published and quoted in AlterNet, Quartz, and XoJane.
