= Walter Chandler (disambiguation) =

Walter Chandler was mayor of Memphis, Tennessee and a U.S. Representative from Tennessee.

Walter Chandler may also refer to:

- Walter M. Chandler (1867–1935), United States Representative from New York
- Walter Chandler (MP), Member of Parliament (MP) for Winchester
