= Edward Chandler (American football) =

American football coach

Biographical details
- Born: August 1, 1925
- Died: June 5, 1999 (aged 73); Norfolk, Virginia, U.S.
- Education: Davidson

Coaching career (HC unless noted)

Football
- 1952: Bridgewater

Head coaching record
- Overall: 2–4

Edward Traylor "Buddy" Chandler Sr. (August 1, 1925 – June 5, 1999) was an American football coach at Bridgewater College in Bridgewater, Virginia. Chandler led the Eagles to a record of 2–4 in 1952.

== Head coaching record ==
Year	Team	Overall	Conference	Standing	Bowl/playoffs
Bridgewater Eagles (Mason–Dixon Conference / Virginia Little Six Conference) (1952)
1952	Bridgewater	2–4	1–2 / 0–2	T–3rd / 4th	
Bridgewater:		2–4	1–2		
Total:		2–4			
