= Chandler (band) =

American Christian contemporary band

- Origin: Stockbridge, Georgia U.S.
- Genres: CCM; Rock; Pop
- Years active: 2006–2009
- Label: Red Ink Music
- Members: Jeff Chandler; Jon Chandler; Trey Roth
- Website: chandlertheband.com

Chandler is a Christian contemporary/praise and worship band. The band is made up of three brothers and their two childhood friends. They are from Stockbridge, Georgia, along with their counterpart Casting Crowns. In 2007, they had a national hit single on Christian Inspirational radio with their song "I Know You're There," which has since been covered by Casting Crowns on their album The Altar and the Door.

== History ==
Around 1997, two of the brothers used to lead worship for various youth groups around Stockbridge, with Andy Williams (one-time drummer for Casting Crowns) accompanying them. Jeff used to travel and sing solo for different churches and events using backup tracks. A few years later they decided it would be a good idea to join, along with Tim and Trey to form a concrete band of brothers and friends to spread the message of Jesus wherever God would lead them. They went from various band names such as HALO- and Halas before settling on their current name as Chandler.

== Ministry ==
Chandler uses the verses in Matthew 5 of the Christian Bible for the focus of their ministry. The band's lead singer, Jeff Chandler, describes, "Matthew 5 tells us that we are to be salt and light. A huge percentage of the believers lose sight of this purpose when it comes to our daily lives. Salt by its nature brings about healing and flavor where it is applied. We challenge ourselves and our audience to embrace this truth: Is wherever you are a better place because you are there?"

== Notable songs ==
- I Know You're There
- Purify
- Lightning
- Delirious
- One and Only
- Come Around
- Tears Over Jordan
