= William Henry Chandler (chemist) =

American chemist

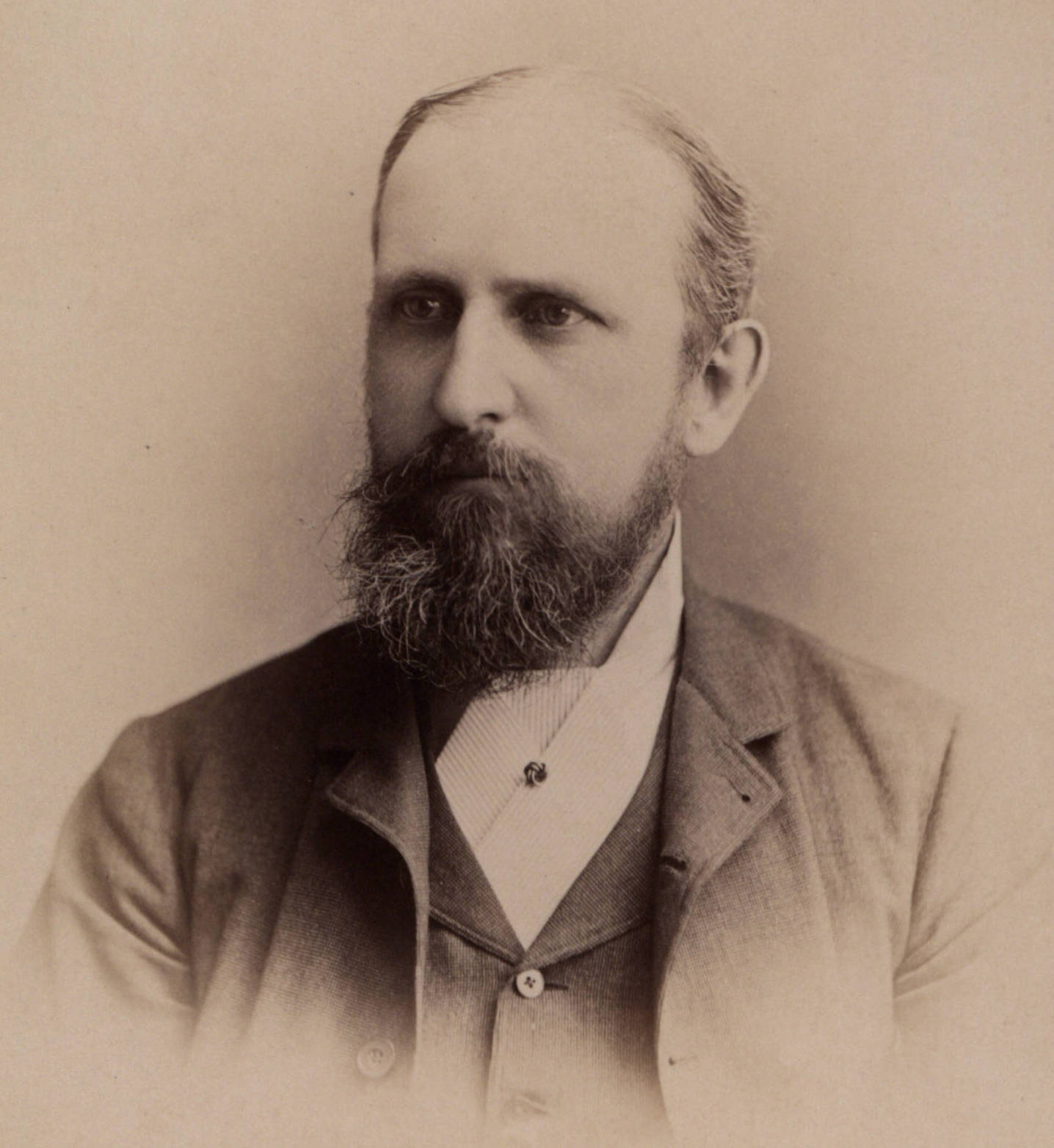
- Born: December 13, 1841; New Bedford, Massachusetts, US
- Died: November 23, 1906 (aged 64); Bethlehem, Pennsylvania, US
- Scientific career
- Fields: Chemistry

William Henry Chandler (December 13, 1841 – November 23, 1906) was an American chemist.

== Biography ==
William Henry Chandler was born in New Bedford, Massachusetts, on December 13, 1841, to Charles Chandler and Sarah Whitney. Chandler had two siblings, a brother named Charles, and a sister named Catherine. He was educated at Union College, and from 1862 to 1867 he was a chemist for various companies. From 1868 to 1871 Chandler was an instructor in chemistry at the Columbia School of Mines. He received a Ph.D. from Hamilton College in 1872. In 1871, he became a professor of chemistry at Lehigh University. Chandler was a fellow of the Chemical Society of London, and a member of the Chemical Societies of Paris and New York. In 1876 he was a juror at the Philadelphia Centennial Exhibition, and in 1878 at the Paris exhibition. His contributions to chemical literature appeared principally in American Chemist, which he and his brother, Charles F. Chandler, edited from 1870 until 1877.

Chandler's interests extended beyond chemistry. In 1878, he was made director of Lehigh University's Linderman Library, which he ran for many years. Chandler also compiled an encyclopedia, Chandler's Encyclopedia: An Epitome of Universal Knowledge, which was published in 1898 by P. F. Collier & Son.

Chandler married Mary Elizabeth Sayre on June 10, 1873. They had three children, Robert, Evelyn, and Sarah Whitney. He died on November 23, 1906, in Bethlehem, Pennsylvania.
