= Christopher N. Chandler =

American journalist (1938–2019)

Christopher Norris Chandler
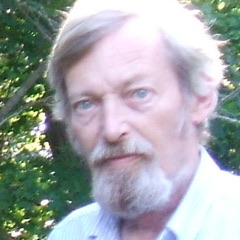
- Born: July 12, 1938; Cambridge, Massachusetts, U.S.
- Died: March 26, 2019 (aged 80); Chicago, Illinois, U.S.
- Education: Bowdoin College
- Employer: Chicago Sun-Times

Christopher Norris Chandler (July 12, 1938 - March 26, 2019) was a journalist, political speechwriter, and organizer. Chandler was a strategist, speechwriter and press secretary for Harold Washington, Chicago's first African-American mayor, and later press secretary for Chicago Congressman Bobby Rush. He was a journalist for the Chicago Sun-Times in the 1960s and for WBBM Channel 2 TV in Chicago in the 1970s, where he earned an Emmy for a documentary on the 1968 Democratic Convention. He founded, co-founded and edited several publications, including the Chicago Journalism Review, the Chicago Free Press, the Daily Planet, and the online North Avenue Magazine. He was the author of two books, Sex Objects in the Sky and Harold Washington and the Civil Rights Legacy.

== Journalist ==
Chandler was a reporter for the Chicago Sun-Times from 1964 to 1969, and covered education, housing, and the civil rights movement. His coverage of the 1968 Democratic National Convention in Chicago and the demonstrations and police riots that accompanied it won many accolades. Theodore White, in his account of that election, "The Making of a President, 1968," said Chandler's reporting "provided the best background of events at Chicago that I have read," on this widely covered event

He then was one of four co-founders of the Chicago Journalism Review, which offered journalists an opportunity to air stories that they felt were suppressed or insufficiently covered. He then co-founded and edited the Chicago Free Press, and later another weekly publication, the Daily Planet, which counted among its contributors the author Nelson Algren. In later years, he founded an online magazine called North Avenue Magazine.

He was a producer with WBBM-TV Channel 2 in Chicago from 1976 to 1980, working with Bill Kurtis' investigative team, the Focus unit. A documentary he produced there, on the tenth anniversary of the 1968 convention, was awarded an Emmy for best documentary.

In the 1990s, he worked for eight years as a science writer for Northwestern University's McCormick School of Engineering.

== Political strategist and speechwriter ==
Chandler worked on the 1968 presidential campaign of Robert F. Kennedy. In 1972, presidential candidate George McGovern asked him to be his press secretary, but later rescinded the offer. Years later, he became a political strategist and speechwriter for what was considered a long-shot campaign by Harold Washington to become the first African-American mayor of Chicago. After that successful campaign, he became assistant press secretary and speechwriter in the early years of the Washington administration. Later, he became press secretary for US Congressman Bobby Rush.

== Organizer ==
Chandler was involved in political organizing at various stages. In the 1960s, he organized a tenant's union in his apartment complex. Later, during a stint driving a cab in Chicago, he helped to organize a cab drivers' union, and then created, wrote and edited a newsletter for the union.

== Author ==
Chandler wrote two books. The first, Sex Objects in the Sky, co-written with Paula Kane, detailed the problems faced by airline stewardesses, including one of the first reports on issues of radiation exposure by airline crews. The second, Harold Washington and the Civil Rights Legacy, is a memoir of his time serving in the campaign and the early years of the administration of Harold Washington, the first African-American ever elected mayor of Chicago, where he served as a political strategist and speechwriter during the tumultuous come-from-behind candidacy, and then as assistant press secretary and speechwriter in the administration.
