= Caroline Augusta Chandler =

Caroline Augusta Chandler (1906–1979) was an American pediatrician and child mental health specialist. Her efforts to recruit more young women into the field of medicine included writing books for young girls about the profession.

== Education ==
Chandler was born in Ford City, Pennsylvania, in 1906. She attended Mount Aloysius Academy in Cresson, Pennsylvania, followed by Barnard College, then Yale Medical School where she won awards in medical research and pediatrics, graduating as MD cum laude at Yale in 1933. She continued research at Harvard Medical School on the influenza bacillus responsible for some cases of meningitis, and at Johns Hopkins School of Medicine, on childhood rheumatic fever and hypertension, and the use of sulfanilamide in preventing recurring attacks of rheumatic fever.

== Career ==
During World War II, Chandler left the laboratory to carry out a special project for the Children's Bureau in Washington, D.C. She was commissioned Surgeon in the United States Public Health Service, and certified as a specialist by the American Board of Pediatrics. After the war, she returned to Johns Hopkins as full-time Assistant Professor of Pediatrics. Her research included the use of antibiotics, including their effects in vitro.

However, as her interests in community groups and agencies grew, she had to limit her work to part-time. After serving three years as medical director of the Family and Children's Society, she accepted an assignment with the Maryland State Department of Health as a director of the Office of Mental Health and Child Health. She resigned from that position because her proposals were being completely blocked or indefinitely delayed. In 1961, Chandler joined the staff at the National Institute of Mental Health (NIMH) as chief of Demonstrations Section of the Communities Services Branch. She headed the Child Mental Health Section of the Community Research and Services Branch of the NIMH, and, in 1966, was a member of the US Department of Health, Education and Welfare Task Force on Early Childhood Development. During all of these assignments, she remained an assistant professor of pediatrics and preventive medicine, and instructor of mental hygiene, at Johns Hopkins.

After writing articles about pediatrics, Chandler was approached by the children's editor of a publishing house to write about a woman doctor, for a series of career books for teenage girls. Chandler wrote several books, both fictional and factual, in an effort to recruit more young women into the field of medicine. The characters in her fictional books mirrored Chandler's own life in many respects, although she never married.

== Personal life ==
Chandler lived in Bethesda, Maryland. She died at the Washington Hospital Center, Washington, D.C., on 18 December 1979.

== Books ==
- Susie Stuart, M.D., : a Story of a Young Doctor 1941
- Susie Stuart, Home Front Doctor 1943
- Dr. Kay Winthrop, Intern 1947
- Famous Men of Medicine 1950
- Famous Modern Men of Medicine 1965
- Nursing as a Career 1970
- Early Child Care: The New Perspectives 1968
