= Allan Chandler =

Australian rules footballer (1907–1970)

Personal information
- Full name: Allan Chandler
- Born: 3 June 1907; Boronia, Victoria
- Died: 14 March 1970 (aged 62); Prahran, Victoria
- Original team: Burwood
- Height: 188 cm (6 ft 2 in)
- Weight: 87 kg (192 lb)

Playing career^{1}
Years	Club	Games (Goals)
1928–1929, 1931–1932	Hawthorn	55 (9)
- ^{1} Playing statistics correct to the end of 1932.

Allan Chandler (3 June 1907 – 14 March 1970) was an Australian rules footballer who played for the Hawthorn Football Club in the Victorian Football League (VFL).

== Early life ==
The son of politician Alfred Elliott Chandler (1873–1935) and Marie Christiane Chandler (1881–1958), née Intemann, Allan Chandler was born at Boronia on 3 June 1907.

== Football ==
Allan Chandler moved to Hawthorn from Burwood, making his debut as a ruckman midway through the 1928 season against Fitzroy. In the final game of that season, his brother Gilbert also played for Hawthorn in his only senior VFL game. Allan Chandler went on to play 55 games over five seasons with Hawthorn.

== War service ==
Chandler enlisted in the Royal Australian Air Force during World War II, serving as a Leading Aircraftman for 20 months.

== Later life ==
After his football career, Chandler worked as a nurseryman and florist in the outer eastern suburbs of Melbourne.

Allan Chandler died suddenly in Prahran on 14 March 1970, at the age of 62, and was cremated at Springvale Botanical Cemetery.
