= Grace Chandler =

American photographer

Grace Chandler (1879 – February 12, 1967), also known as Grace Chandler Horn, was an American photographer based in Michigan, best known for her photographs of Native American subjects.

== Early life ==
Grace Maude Chandler was born in Barry County, Michigan, the daughter of David Martin Chandler and Jane Amanda Delphine Chandler. She had sisters Effie Mabel Chandler (Woodworth) and Ila Blanch Chandler (Jones), and a brother Charles Chandler.

== Career ==
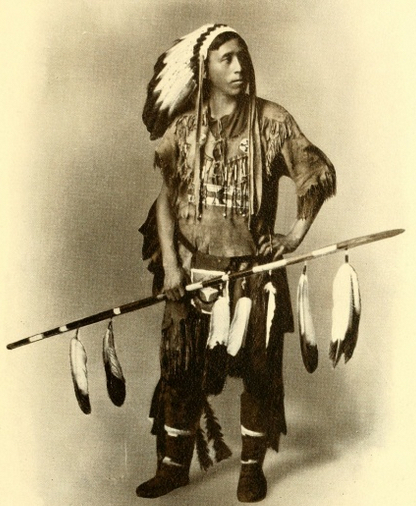
A portrait of an Ojibwe performer in Petoskey, by Grace Chandler Horn, from a 1912 publication.

Chandler started her work in photographer as an assistant to her brother, Charlie Chandler, at his photography studio. As Grace Chandler Horn, she operated the Horn Art Shop in Petoskey, Michigan with her husband from 1899 to 1913, and then on her own. Her shop was part of the tourist attractions built around the annual "Hiawatha Pageant" in Petoskey, so its best sellers were prints and postcards related to that event. Her photographs of the Ojibwe performers and scenes in the pageant were published in 1911 as illustrations in an edition of Longfellow's The Song of Hiawatha. A second volume featuring her work appeared the next year, as an illustrated libretto of the pageant, published by the railroad.

In 1917 her Native American and nature photographs were exhibited by the Arts Association of Grand Rapids, Michigan. In 1923 she moved to Los Angeles, California and opened the Grace Chandler Studio. Her photographs included California landscapes, animal studies, and portraits. She did her own hand-coloring on some images.

== Personal life ==
Grace Chandler married by 1899; that marriage ended in divorce in 1913. She married again in 1917, to James Homer Depeau, but Depeau (or DePew) proved to be legally married to another woman. In 1928, Grace Chandler Horn's sister was concerned about her mental health, based on letters about her interest in mysticism. Grace Chandler was committed as a patient to Norwalk State Hospital. She was institutionalized for nearly forty years. She died in 1967, aged 87 years.

== Legacy ==
Grace Chandler Horn left about four hundred photographs from her active years (1899 to 1928), many of them in private collections, but over 200 of them in the Peter Palmquist Collection of Women in Photography at Yale University Library. In 2003 a small show of landscapes by Grace Chandler was presented at the Kresge Art Museum at Michigan State University, with her Native American-themed works on display at the same time, at the Nokomis Learning Center in Okemos, Michigan.
