= Joseph Chandler =

Joseph Chandler may refer to:

- Joseph Ripley Chandler (1792–1880), member of the U.S. House of Representatives from Pennsylvania
- Joseph P. Chandler (1840–1910), member of the Wisconsin State Assembly
- Joseph Everett Chandler (1863–1946), Colonial Revival architecture
- Joseph Goodhue Chandler (1813–1884), American portrait painter
- Joseph Newton Chandler III (1926–2002), formerly unidentified identity thief
- Joe Chandler (born 1988), rugby league footballer
- Joe Chandler (footballer) (1877–1966), Australian rules footballer
