= Abiel Chandler =

Commission merchant in Boston, Massachusetts

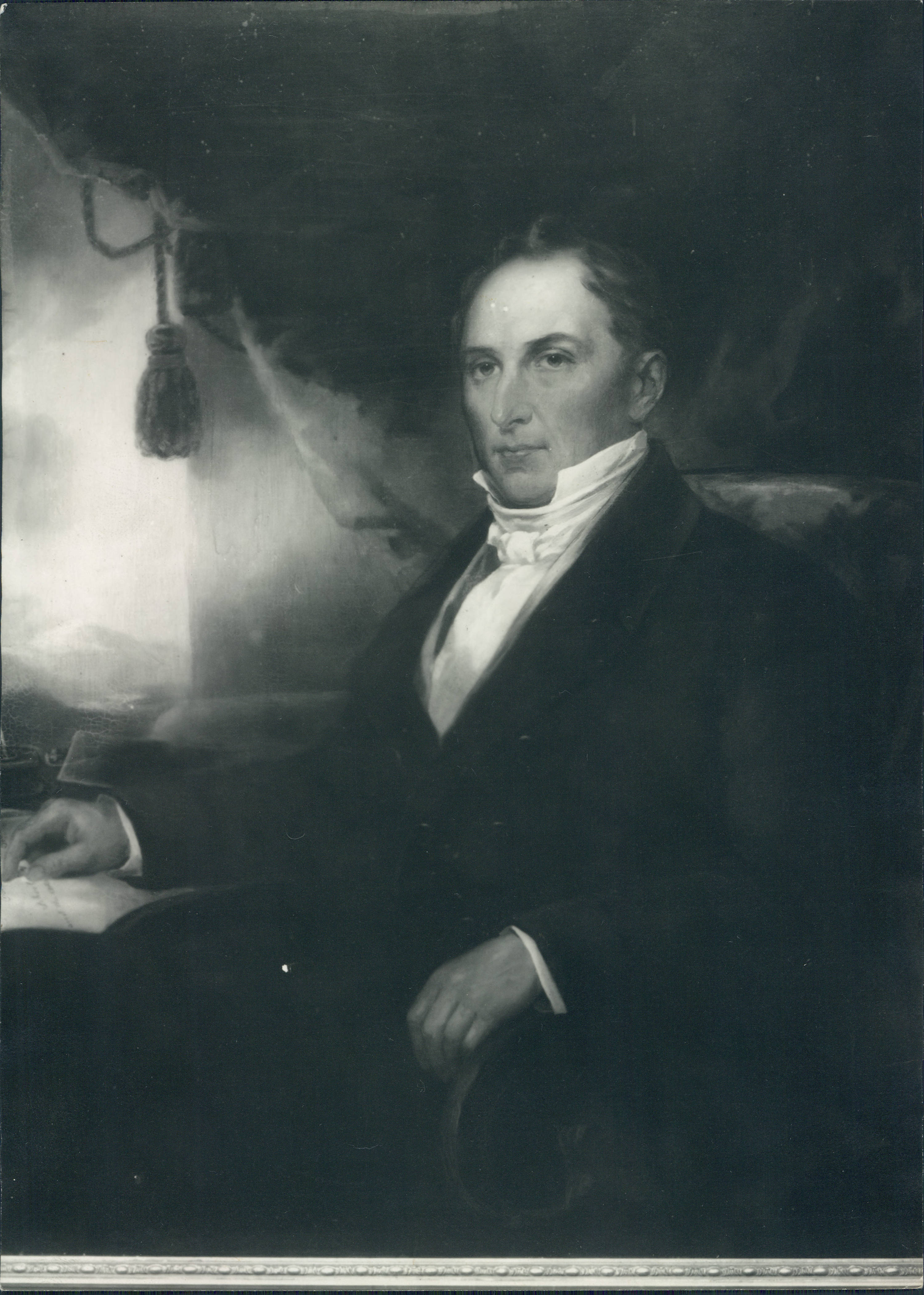
Abiel Chandler

Abiel Chandler (1777–1851) was a native of New Hampshire who prospered as a commission merchant in Boston, Massachusetts during the early nineteenth century. He was the seventh of eight children born to Daniel and Sarah Chandler in Concord, New Hampshire. He attended Fryeburg Academy and later Phillips Exeter Academy. After earning 40 acres (160,000 m^{2}) of land from a family friend, Chandler realized the value of a college education and sold his land to attend Harvard. He was a teacher until 1817 when he entered the commission merchant business and acquired the substantial fortune of almost $100,000. He bequeathed $50,000 to Dartmouth College to establish the Abiel Chandler School of Science and the Arts, founded a year after his death, in 1852.
