= Arthur Chandler =

Arthur Chandler may refer to:

- Arthur Chandler (footballer) (1895–1984), footballer for Leicester City, Queens Park Rangers and Notts County
- Arthur Chandler (bishop) (1860–1939), Bishop of Bloemfontein, 1902–1920
- A. Bertram Chandler (1912–1984), British-Australian science fiction author
