= William Chandler =

William Chandler may refer to:

- Bill Chandler, college basketball coach
- Bill Chandler (ice hockey) (1930–1991), Canadian ice hockey player
- Billy Chandler (1876–1924), American racing driver
- Billy Chandler (politician) (born 1937), American politician
- William Chandler (bookmaker) (died 1946), British bookmaker
- William Chandler (businessman), 19th-century abolitionist and railroad executive
- William Chandler (character) character in the soap opera Fashion House
- William B. Chandler III, American judge
- William E. Chandler (1835–1917), United States Secretary of the Navy and senator
- William Henry Chandler (disambiguation)
- William W. Chandler, engineer, see Post Office Research Station
