= Gordon Chandler (cricketer) =

English cricketer (1909–2003)

Personal information
- Born: 23 October 1909; Purley, Surrey
- Died: 27 October 2003 (aged 94); Chichester, Sussex
- Source: Cricinfo, 17 April 2017

Gordon Chandler (23 October 1909 – 27 October 2003) was an English cricketer. He played two first-class matches for Cambridge University Cricket Club in 1929.

== See also ==
- List of Cambridge University Cricket Club players
