= Henry F. Chandler =

- Born: September 26, 1835; Andover, Massachusetts
- Died: November 16, 1906 (aged 71); Andover, Massachusetts
- Military career
- Allegiance: United States of America
- Branch: United States Army
- Rank: Sergeant
- Unit: 59th Massachusetts Infantry Regiment - Company E
- Conflicts: Second Battle of Petersburg
- Awards: Medal of Honor

Sergeant Henry F. Chandler (September 26, 1835 – November 16, 1906) was an American soldier who fought in the American Civil War. Chandler received the country's highest award for bravery during combat, the Medal of Honor, for his action during the Second Battle of Petersburg in Virginia on 17 June 1864. He was honored with the award on 30 March 1898.

== Biography ==
Chandler was born in Andover, Massachusetts on 26 September 1835. He enlisted into the 59th Massachusetts Infantry. He died on 16 November 1906, and his remains are interred at the West Parish Garden Cemetery in Andover.

== Medal of Honor citation ==
Though seriously wounded in a bayonet charge and directed to go to the rear he declined to do so, but remained with his regiment and helped to carry the breastworks.

== See also ==
- List of American Civil War Medal of Honor recipients: A–F
