= Albert Chandler =

Albert Chandler may refer to:

- Ben Chandler (Albert Benjamin Chandler III, born 1959), American politician from Kentucky and grandson of Happy Chandler
- Happy Chandler (Albert Benjamin Chandler Sr., 1898–1991), member of the Baseball Hall of Fame and American politician
- Albert Brown Chandler (1840–1923), founder of the Postal Telegraph Company
