= Chris Chantler =

Chris Chantler may refer to:

- Chris Chantler (writer), British comedy writer and performer
- Chris Chantler (footballer) (born 1990), English footballer

== See also ==
- Christopher Chandler (disambiguation)
- Christopher Chantler, Australian physicist at the University of Melbourne
