= Ian Chandler (footballer) =

English footballer and manager

Personal information
- Date of birth: 20 March 1968 (age 58)
- Place of birth: Sunderland, England
- Position: Forward

Youth career
- Barnsley

Senior career*
Years	Team	Apps	(Gls)
1986–1988	Barnsley	12	(5)
1987	→ Stockport County (loan)	5	(0)
1988–1989	Aldershot F.C.	9	(2)
1989–1995	Whitley Bay		
- Durham City
- South Shields
- Durham City
????–2001	Blyth Spartans		
2001–2003	Whitley Bay		
2003	Bishop Auckland		
2003–2004	Jarrow Roofing		
2004–2014	Whitley Bay		

Managerial career
- 2004–2014: Whitley Bay
- 2014–2015: Durham City
- 2016: Whitley Bay
- 2018–2019: Bishop Auckland
- * Club domestic league appearances and goals as of 15 October 2006

Ian Chandler (born 20 March 1968) is an English former professional footballer.

== Football career ==
=== Playing career ===
==== In the Football League ====
Chandler, a forward, represented England as a schoolboy before joining Barnsley as an apprentice. He turned professional in August 1986 and made his league debut the following season. He made a bright start to his Barnsley career, scoring four times in 12 games that first season, but lost his place and failed to make any further appearances for Barnsley.

He joined Stockport County on loan in August 1987 and moved to Aldershot in August 1988.

==== Into Non-League football ====
After leaving Aldershot in 1989 he trained as an accountant and moved into non-league football with Whitley Bay. He spent six years with Bay, scoring 120 goals in 260 appearances, moving to Durham City in 1995. He subsequently played for South Shields, Durham City again, and Blyth Spartans before rejoining Whitley Bay in the 2001 close-season.

On 12 May 2002 Chandler scored against Tiptree United with a powerful header in extra-time at Villa Park to win the FA Vase for Whitley Bay for the first time in their history. He left Bay in July 2003, joining Bishop Auckland, but was released in September 2003 and, after a short spell with Jarrow Roofing, rejoined Whitley Bay as player-manager in January 2004.

=== Managerial career ===
On 10 May 2009, Chandler led Whitey Bay to their second FA Vase triumph beating Glossope North End, becoming the first man in the competition's history to win as both player and manager. The club retained the FA Vase the following season with a 6–1 win over Wroxham. They retained the trophy again in 2011, beating Coalville Town 3–2 in the final, becoming the first club to win the competition four times and the first to win it three years in succession. In this successful period Chandler became known for his 3-5-2 formation which went out of fashion in the early 90s.

Chandler resigned from the Whitley Bay job in 2014. Later in the year he was appointed manager of Durham City. However, he left the club in October 2015. He returned to Whitley Bay as caretaker manager in February 2016, managing the club until the end of the 2015–16 season.

In May 2018 he was appointed manager of Bishop Auckland.
