= John H. Chandler =

English botanist (1909–1987)

- Born: 1909
- Died: 1987 (aged 77–78)
- Scientific career
- Fields: Botany

John Harris Chandler (1909–1987) was an English botanist best known for his research in the Flora of Lincolnshire, Rutland, Northamptonshire and Cambridgeshire (particularly Rosa, Rubus, Salix and Ulmus). He worked with E. Joan Gibbons in fieldwork in Lincolnshire.

In his professional life, he was an officer for Customs and Excise.

The major part of Chandler's herbarium material is held by Spalding Gentlemen's Society.
