= Bob Chandler (footballer) =

English footballer

Personal information
- Full name: Robert Walter Chandler
- Date of birth: 15 November 1894
- Place of birth: Fort William, British India
- Date of death: 1964 (aged 69–70)
- Position: Goalkeeper

Youth career
- 1909–1910: Aston Town
- 1910–1911: Upper Thomas Street Boys

Senior career*
Years	Team	Apps	(Gls)
1911–1913	Glossop	0	(0)
1913–1914	Aston Villa	1	(0)
1914	Walsall		
- * Club domestic league appearances and goals

Robert Walter Chandler (15 November 1894 – 1964) was an English professional footballer who made one appearance in the Football League for Aston Villa as a goalkeeper.

== Personal life ==
Chandler attested as an Air Mechanic 2nd Class in the Royal Air Force during the latter months of the First World War and worked as a fitter.

== Career statistics ==
Appearances and goals by club, season and competition
Club	Season	League			FA Cup		Total	
Club	Season	Division	Apps	Goals	Apps	Goals	Apps	Goals
Aston Villa	1913–14	First Division	1	0	0	0	1	0
Career total			1	0	0	0	1	0
