= Dick Chandler =

Australian rules footballer, born 1910

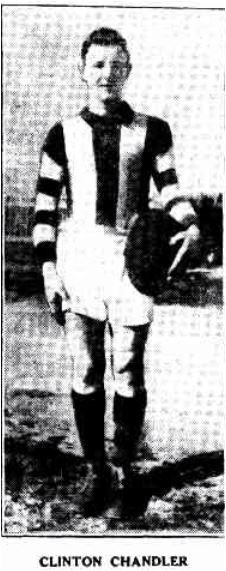
- Chandler in 1928

Personal information
- Full name: Clinton Dickson Chandler
- Nickname: Dick
- Born: 4 April 1910; Bright, Victoria
- Died: 6 June 1969 (aged 59); Glen Iris, Victoria
- Original team: State Savings Bank
- Height: 177 cm (5 ft 10 in)
- Weight: 75 kg (165 lb)

Playing career^{1}
| Years | Club | Games (Goals) |
| 1931 | Hawthorn | 2 (5) |
| 1940 | Carlton | 1 (1) |
| Total | | 3 (6) |
- ^{1} Playing statistics correct to the end of 1940.

Clinton Dickson Chandler (4 April 1910 – 6 June 1969) was an Australian rules footballer who played with Carlton and Hawthorn in the Victorian Football League (VFL).
