= David A. Chandler =

American judge

David A. Chandler (born c. 1947) is a former Associate Justice of the Supreme Court of Mississippi. He is a former justice of the Mississippi Court of Appeals, and a graduate of the University of Mississippi School of Law. He was elected to the state supreme court in 2008, and stepped down on December 7, 2015, to become the director of Mississippi's foster care system under the Division of Family and Children's Services.

Born in Kosciusko, Mississippi, his family moved to Weir, Mississippi, in his childhood.
