= William Henry Chandler (politician) =

American politician (1815–1888)

William Henry Chandler (April 14, 1815 – May 13, 1888) was an American politician.

Chandler, the only child of Randolph and Hannah (Tisdale) Chandler, of Providence, Rhode Island, was born in that city, on April 14, 1815.

He graduated from Yale College in 1839. Upon graduation he entered the Law School of Harvard University, but in May, 1840, a serious disease of the eyes compelled him to abandon all his plans. After a year of acute suffering, he made a trial of a country life in the village of Pomfret, Connecticut, his father's native place, with such encouraging results that in 1842 he purchased a few acres of land in the adjoining town of Thompson, and after his marriage (on March 24, 1842, to Martha Helen) settled there, and by active outdoor life on a farm recovered fully his health. He continued in Thompson until his death.

He was elected as Representative in the Connecticut House in 1847, and an election to the State Senate in 1867. He died in Thompson, May 13, 1888, in his 74th year His wife survived him with four daughters and one son; one daughter was the wife of Charles R. Forrest, Esq.
