= Chandler School =

Independent school in Pasadena, California, US

Coordinates: 34.159605°N 118.162751°W

- Pasadena, California; United States

Information
- Type: Independent, Co-Ed, K-8 Day School
- Established: 1950
- Founder: Thomas Chandler, Catherine Chandler
- Head of school: Emily Brown
- Employees: 56 faculty members (including 15 teaching assistants and 14 subject specialists)
- Grades: K-8
- Enrollment: 450
- Athletics: 11 team sports
- Website: chandlerschool.org

Chandler School is an independent, co-ed day school in Pasadena, California, United States, founded in 1950. It caters for students from kindergarten through grade eight, with a total enrollment of 450 students. The 4.5-acre (1.8 ha) campus overlooks the Pasadena Rose Bowl and the Arroyo Seco.

== History ==
In 1950, Thomas and Catherine Chandler founded the Chandler School in Altadena with an initial enrollment of 14 students in grades four through eight. After eight years, the school outgrew the original Altadena campus, and with the help of 40 parents, a down payment was raised to purchase the present Armada Drive property. Construction was completed one room at a time with donated materials and labor. A Board of Trustees was formed, and Chandler became a 501(c) 3 non-profit institution. The site at 1005 Armada Drive opened to students on September 20, 1958, with two buildings and an athletic field.

The school continued to expand, with the first kindergarten class enrolled in 1963. Construction on the original South Campus began in 1970 and was completed in 1972.

In 1976, when founder Thomas Chandler retired, Arthur L.P. Brown became Chandler School's second head teacher.

By 1979, the school had 366 students from kindergarten through eighth grade. That same year, Jefferson C. Stephens, Jr. became Chandler's third head.

The gymnasium-multipurpose building was added in 1981.

Thomas A. Chandler died in 1996, but his wife Catherine remains active in the school community. In 1998, the Pasadena Planning Commission approved Chandler's 10-year Master Plan and the Chandler 2000 Lower School Project. Construction on the new project began in 2000 and was completed in 2001. John Finch became Chandler's fourth head in the same year.

Chandler had an enrollment of 450 students, its largest ever, at its new South Campus in the fall of 2011, featuring a Middle School classroom building, a renovated gym, and an outdoor sports court.

In 2018, Chandler School welcomed its first female Head of School, Mrs. Emily Brown. In 2020, it opened a new innovation center dedicated to STEM projects in the South Campus.

In 2026, Chandler celebrated its 75th anniversary.

== Notable alumni ==
- Charles Webb, author of the novel The Graduate
- John Battelle, author, journalist, and co-founder of Wired magazine
- Mo Martin, professional golfer
