= List of Ohio University faculty =

The following people have been employed by or are otherwise currently employed on the faculty at Ohio University in Athens, Ohio.

== Distinguished faculty ==
The university recognizes faculty each year as endowed "Distinguished Professors".

Name	Department	Year
Brian C. Clark	physiologist	2026
Kevin Mattson	historian and critic	2025
Sarah Wyatt	plant molecular biologist	2024
Gerardine Botte	Russ Professor in the Department of Chemical and Biomolecular Engineering	2015
John Kopchick	Goll-Ohio Eminent Scholar and Professor of Molecular Biology in the Edison Biotechnology Institute	2012
Mark Halliday	Poetry	2011
David A. Drabold	Physics	2005
Alexander Arhangelskii	Mathematics	2003
Robert J. DeMott	English	1998
Alonzo L. Hamby	History	1996
Wayne Dodd	English	1993
Gladys Bailin	Dance	1986
Richard K. Vedder	Economics	1985
Peter R. Griffiths	Chemistry	1980
George R. Klare	Psychology	1979
Hollis Summers	English	1964
Paul Murray Kendall	English	1959

== Other notable faculty ==
- Jon Edward Ahlquist (1944–2020), molecular biologist and zoologist
- Jon Anderson (1940–2007), taught poetry
- Terry A. Anderson (1947–2024), journalist
- Eddie Ashworth, media arts and studies professor
- Gladys Bailin, choreographer and dancer
- Erin Belieu, poet
- Danny Bentley, pharmacist
- John Joseph Brady, journalist
- Frank Ching, taught drawing
- William E. Connolly, political theorist
- Antonio Cua, philosopher
- Stephen Custer, cellist
- Hamza El Din, composer
- Pam Durban, novelist
- Aethelred Eldridge, painter
- Patrick J. Fox, Dean of the Russ College of Engineering and Technology
- Walter S. Gamertsfelder, professor of philosophy, later dean and president of Ohio University
- David Macinnis Gill, novelist, taught English
- Lori Stewart Gonzalez, current president and language pathology professor
- Frank Pierrepont Graves, taught education
- Melvin Helitzer, taught journalism
- Jeffrey Herf, taught history
- Paul Hersey, entrepreneur
- Granville Hicks, educator and writer
- David Hostetler, sculptor
- Josh Hyde, filmmaker
- Colette Inez, composer
- William Wartenbee Johnson, former trustee
- Daniel Keyes, author
- Brian Kiteley, novelist
- Kathy Krendl, former provost, former president of Otterbein University
- Karl Kroeger, composer
- P. Lal, poet
- Raymond Luebbers, electrical engineer
- Nathaniel Massie, former trustee
- Hilary Masters, taught writing
- Kevin Mattson, historian and critic
- Zakes Mda, taught English
- Dinty W. Moore, teaches English
- M. Duane Nellis, president emeritus and geography professor
- Benjamin M. Ogles, dean at Brigham Young University, former dean of Arts and Sciences
- Charles L. Peterson, painter
- Cosmo Pieterse, playwright
- Ilmar Raag, film director
- J. Allyn Rosser, poet
- Steven Rubenstein (1962–2012), anthropologist
- Alfred Ryors, taught mathematics; former Ohio University president
- Sheila Schwartz (1952–2008), writer and creative writing professor
- Scott Sharp, politician
- Eve Shelnutt, poet
- Brian Smith, photographer
- Thomas S. Smith, former provost
- Pete Souza, photojournalist who later chronicled Barack Obama's presidency
- Darrell Spencer, taught creative writing
- David E. Sweet, taught political science
- Joe Tait, taught sportscasting
- Eli Todd Tappan, taught mathematics
- Mark Tatge, taught journalism
- Walter Tevis, taught creative writing
- William Thon, taught painting
- Shane Tilton, teaches electronic media
- Irma Voigt, first dean of women at Ohio University (1913–1949)
- James J. Whalen, former executive vice president
- Robert Whealey, professor emeritus
- Lawrence Witmer, paleontologist
- Mark Wunderlich, poet
- Sarah E. Wyatt, plant molecular biologist
