= Beverly Schmidt Blossom =

American dancer, choreographer and teacher

- Born: August 28, 1926; Chicago, Illinois, U.S.
- Died: November 1, 2014 (aged 88); Chicago, Illinois, U.S.
- Education: Roosevelt University
- Spouse: Roberts Blossom (m. 1966; div. 1970)
- Awards: New York Dance and Performance Award; Martha Hill Award

Beverly Carol Schmidt Blossom (August 28, 1926 – November 1, 2014) was an American modern dancer, choreographer, and teacher. She was an original member and soloist with the Alwin Nikolais Dance Theater, a modern dance choreographer for Illinois Dance Theatre, Blossom & Co. and others, and a professor at the University of Illinois Urbana-Champaign.

== Early life and training ==
Born in Chicago, Illinois on August 28, 1926, to Theodore and Florence Schmidt, Schmidt held a bachelor's degree in liberal arts from Roosevelt University and a master's degree in dance from Sarah Lawrence College where performance artist Meredith Monk was one of her dance composition students.

== New York career ==
Schmidt was a principal dancer of the Alwin Nikolais Dance Theatre from 1953–63, dancing alongside Murray Louis and Phyllis Lamhut. She produced concerts of her own choreography in New York in the 1960s, participating in the development of the Filmstage theatre of actor/poet Roberts Blossom, her husband from 1966-70.

== University of Illinois ==
Blossom was professor of dance at the University of Illinois at Urbana-Champaign from 1967–90 and was a professor emerita until her death in 2014. She choreographed and performed more than 100 works and received numerous grants from the National Endowment for the Arts, New York State Council for the Arts, Illinois Arts Council, and private foundations.

== Solo career ==
Blossom renewed her career as a performer, presenting her solo works at the 1988 Jacob's Pillow, Massachusetts "Splash" Festival, and at the Joyce Theatre 1989 showcase "Womanworks".

== New York Times reviews ==
Jennifer Dunning of The New York Times called Blossom "a rare performer", adding "a zany, hilarious goof of a clown, Miss Blossom is also a tragic figure of great dignity, bringing an audience to tears and laughter as her dances ravel and unravel, simultaneously, before one's eyes" (1985).

In 1994, Anna Kisselgoff described Blossom's tribute to her mentor Nikolais after his death: "Here, she is the tattered clown with a suitcase, gazing at a shattered Styrofoam mannekin. Reassembling the figure, she swept it into a soaring curve. but this was only a remembrance of poetic time past, a strong tribute to the death of an artist."

== Documentary of Roberts Blossom ==
Blossom appeared in a documentary about her former husband, actor Roberts Blossom in 2000, titled, Full Blossom: The Life and Times of Actor/Poet Roberts Blossom. The couple had one son, Michael.

== Retirement ==
After her retirement, Blossom choreographed for her own company (Blossom & Co. Inc.), in addition to guest performing and teaching. In December 2010, she appeared in the Nikolais Centennial Alumni Concerts at Hunter College, speaking and performing at both presentations.

Blossom was a mentor to Henning Rübsam, who first studied with her at the Nikolais studio and then performed her work starting in 1994. Other interpreters of Blossom's dances have included Betsy Fisher, Cynthia Pipkin-Doyle and Christine Reisner.

== Awards ==
- 1993: New York Dance and Performance Award (Bessie Award) for sustained achievement.
- 2009: Martha Hill Award for Lifetime Achievement, November 30, 2009 at The Cathedral in New York City. Fellow Nikolais dancer Murray Louis was Master of Ceremonies and Jennifer Dunning presented the award.

== Death ==
Blossom died in Chicago, Illinois on November 1, 2014, from cancer, at age 88. Her sole immediate survivor is her son, Michael Blossom.
