= List of Gamma Sigma Delta chapters =

Gamma Sigma Delta is a co-ed honor society for students of agriculture and the related sciences. Its first six chapters began as Delta Theta Sigma. Where several of these six had closed, at refounding, they have been installed subsequently as a Gamma Sigma Delta chapter with a later chartering date. The creation of chapters continued after the 2012 History was written, with the 2014 establishment of a chapter at Massachusetts according to the fraternity's website.

== Delta Theta Sigma chapters ==
In the following list, active chapters are indicated in bold and inactive chapters are in italics.

Chapter	Charter date and range	Institution	Location	Status	Ref.
Ohio State (see **Ohio State 2**)	Dec 1, 1905 – 19xx ?	Ohio State University	Columbus, Ohio	Withdrew (local)	(Note: Continued as the Alpha chapter of Delta Theta Sigma with no legal connection with Gamma Sigma Delta. Two decades later, a chapter of Gamma Sigma Delta was established on the Ohio State campus.)
**Iowa State**	Apr 9, 1907	Iowa State University	Ames, Iowa	Active	
Penn State 1 (see **Penn State 2**)	Mar 30, 1908 – 19xx ?	Pennsylvania State University	State College, Pennsylvania	Reestablished	(Note: Refounded in 1922 after the demise of this earlier chapter)
**Missouri**	Nov 23, 1908	University of Missouri	Columbia, Missouri	Active	
Utah State	Mar 30, 1909 – 19xx ?	Utah State University	Logan, Utah	Inactive	
Oregon State (see **Oregon State 2**)	Apr 13, 1909 – 19xx ?	Oregon State University	Corvallis, Oregon	Reestablished	(Note: Refounded in 1981.)

== Gamma Sigma Delta chapters ==
In the following list, active chapters are indicated in bold and inactive chapters are in italics.

Chapter	Charter date and range	Institution	Location	Status	Ref.
**Kansas State**	June 25, 1914	Kansas State University	Manhattan, Kansas	Active	
**Auburn**	April 1916	Auburn University	Auburn, Alabama	Active	
**Minnesota**	June 4, 1917	University of Minnesota	Minneapolis, MN	Active	
**Nebraska**	May 25, 1918	University of Nebraska–Lincoln	Lincoln, Nebraska	Active	
**Penn State 2** (see Penn State 1)	October 10, 1922	Pennsylvania State University	State College, Pennsylvania	Active	(Note: Refounded after demise of earlier chapter)
**Illinois**	November 17, 1923	University of Illinois Urbana-Champaign	Urbana, Illinois	Active	
Washington, DC alumni	November 11, 1924 – 192x ?		Washington, D.C.	Inactive	(Note: Establishment of this chapter was approved on Dec. 27, 1923, with 16 members present. There is no further reference to this chapter in minutes of any Biennial Conclave.)
**Ohio State 2** (see Ohio State 1)	November 12, 1928	Ohio State University	Columbus, Ohio	Active	(Note: This chapter was established on the same campus as the original founding chapter. That previous group, which had remained Delta Theta Sigma, had thus essentially reverted to local status.)
**Puerto Rico**	May 24, 1938	University of Puerto Rico at Mayagüez	Mayagüez, Puerto Rico	Active	
**Arkansas**	May 17, 1954	University of Arkansas at Monticello	Monticello, Arkansas	Active	
**Connecticut**	May 26, 1954	University of Connecticut	Storrs, Connecticut	Active	
**Kentucky**	January 14, 1955	University of Kentucky	Lexington, Kentucky	Active	
**No. Carolina St.**	April 28, 1955	North Carolina State University	Raleigh, North Carolina	Active	
**Florida**	April 29, 1955	University of Florida	Gainesville, Florida	Active	
**Clemson**	May 16, 1957	Clemson University	Clemson, South Carolina	Active	
**Philippines**	October 24, 1957	University of the Philippines Los Baños College of Agriculture and Food Science	Los Baños, Laguna, Philippines	Active	
**Arizona**	March 26, 1958	University of Arizona	Tucson, Arizona	Active	
**South Dakota**	May 27, 1958	University of South Dakota	Vermillion, South Dakota	Active	
**West Virginia**	May 8, 1959	West Virginia University	Morgantown, West Virginia	Active	
**Wyoming**	January 19, 1961	University of Wyoming	Laramie, Wyoming	Active	
**Louisiana State**	August 3, 1961	Louisiana State University	Baton Rouge, Louisiana	Active	
**Georgia**	December 1, 1961	University of Georgia	Athens, Georgia	Active	
**Colorado**	June 20, 1963	University of Colorado Boulder	Boulder, Colorado	Active	
**Mississippi State**	February 25, 1964	Mississippi State University	Starkville, Mississippi	Active	
**Tennessee**	June 4, 1964	University of Tennessee	Knoxville, Tennessee	Active	
**Texas A & M**	July 1, 1965	Texas A&M University	College Station, Texas	Active	
**Nevada**	March 25, 1966	University of Nevada, Reno	Reno, Nevada	Active	
**California - Pomona**	April 6, 1967	California State Polytechnic University, Pomona	Pomona, California	Active	
**Wisconsin**	May 9, 1967	University of Wisconsin–Madison	Madison, Wisconsin	Active	
**Hawaii**	October 25, 1968	University of Hawaiʻi at Mānoa	Honolulu, Hawaii	Active	
**VPI & SU**	March 9, 1970	Virginia Tech	Blacksburg, Virginia	Active	
**Purdue**	April 11, 1972	Purdue University	West Lafayette, Indiana	Active	
**Texas Tech**	June 15, 1972	Texas Tech University	Lubbock, Texas	Active	
**Idaho**	May 2, 1973	University of Idaho	Moscow, Idaho	Active	
**No. Carolina A&T**	October 22, 1974	North Carolina A&T State University	Greensboro, North Carolina	Active	
**New Mexico State**	October 12, 1979	New Mexico State University	Las Cruces, New Mexico	Active	
**Oregon State 2** (see Oregon State 1)	October 22, 1981	Oregon State University	Corvallis, Oregon	Active	
**California - Riverside**	March 15, 1982	University of California, Riverside	Riverside, California	Active	
**Maryland**	February 23, 1984	University of Maryland, College Park	College Park, Maryland	Active	
**Texas A&I**	May 11, 1984	Texas A&M University–Kingsville	Kingsville, Texas	Active	
**Oklahoma State**	May 15, 1984	Oklahoma State University	Stillwater, Oklahoma	Active	
**Tuskegee**	October 25, 1985	Tuskegee University	Tuskegee, Alabama	Active	
**Cornell**	May 20, 1986	Cornell University	Ithaca, New York	Active	
**Washington State**	June 16, 1987	Washington State University	Pullman, Washington	Active	
**Michigan State**	May 25, 1988	Michigan State University	East Lansing, Michigan	Active	
**Honduras**	October 28, 1989	Zamorano Pan-American Agricultural School	San Antonio de Oriente, Francisco Morazán, Honduras	Active	
**Florida A&M**	April 12, 1997	Florida A&M University	Tallahassee, Florida	Active	
**California - Davis**	November 16, 2000	University of California, Davis	Davis, California	Active	
**Langston University**	April 23, 2002	Langston University	Langston, Oklahoma	Active	
**Arkansas - Pine Bluff**	April 4, 2005	University of Arkansas at Pine Bluff	Pine Bluff, Arkansas	Active	
**Western Kentucky**	April 28, 2005	Western Kentucky University	Bowling Green, Kentucky	Active	
**North Dakota State**	November 1, 2005	North Dakota State University	Fargo, North Dakota	Active	
**Massachusetts**	March 25, 2014	University of Massachusetts Amherst	Amherst, Massachusetts	Active	
