= Rubsam =

Rübsam is a surname. Notable people with the surname include:

- Henning Rübsam, German-born US-based choreographer and dancer
- Wolfgang Rübsam (born 1946), German-American organist, pianist, composer, and pedagogue
