= Gundu =

Gundu may refer to:

- Gundu Island, Kochi, India
- Gundu, Nepal, Ward No. 7 of Suryabinayak Municipality, Nepal
- Gundu Kalyanam, an Indian actor
- Gundu Hanumantha Rao, an Indian actor in Telugu cinema
- Gundu Hirisave Rama Rao, an Indian scientist and entrepreneur
- Gundu Sudarshan, an Indian comedian in Telugu cinema
- Gundu Sudha Rani, an Indian politician
- R. Gundu Rao, an Indian politician, former Chief Minister of Karnataka
