= Henning Rübsam =

Choreographer and dancer

- Born: Marburg, Germany
- Education: Juilliard School (BFA), Hunter College (MA)
- Occupations: choreographer and dancer

Henning Rübsam is a choreographer and dancer based in New York City. He is the artistic director of SENSEDANCE, a faculty member of The Juilliard School and Fordham University, and a visiting guest professor at Texas Academy of Ballet (Carolyn Bognar, director). He is the dance curator for Arts at Work and a resident choreographer for Hartford City Ballet.

== Early life and work ==
Rübsam was born in Marburg, Germany, where he took his first ballet class at the age of five. He studied with André Doutreval in Kassel and at the Hamburg Opera Ballet School. For several summers he studied at the Internationale Sommerakademie des Tanzes in Köln.

After moving to New York as a teenager, Rübsam's early mentors included Martha Hill and Elizabeth Keen. While a student at the Juilliard School, he took Classical Spanish Dance, studied Indian dance with Indrani Rahman, took a summer intensive at the School of American Ballet, performed as the Faun in the Nijinsky/Debussy ballet, starred in a dance film at the Sundance Institute, where he worked with Diane Coburn-Bruning, Michael Kidd and Stanley Donen, and toured internationally with the Limón Dance Company. He received a B.F.A. degree in dance from Juilliard in 1991.

Upon graduation he founded his own ensemble SENSEDANCE and continued to dance with other choreographers, namely Duncan Macfarland, Murray Louis and most importantly Alwin Nikolais. Rübsam found his next mentor in Beverly Schmidt Blossom, whose work he performed after Nikolais' passing. His interest in early modern dance led to guest appearances with repertory companies in the works of Isadora Duncan, Doris Humphrey and Anna Sokolow. His early work Schubert: Lieder (1991) and his epic solo Sand to Chopin (1993) might owe influences to José Limón, but an independent signature was visible early on, since Rübsam was able to create melodic lines in movement that conversed with the music rather than mirrored it. Rübsam appeared as a guest dancer with a myriad of contemporary choreographers and used his own company as a laboratory for ideas that ranged from setting biblical stories to live accompaniment of a 27-member choir at St. Mark's Church in Carissimi's "Jephte" (and setting an attendance record for the venue) to visceral movement experimentation in an evolutionary safari named "Dolphins and Antelopes" (1996). For the latter as well as future works "Moonpaths" (1998), "Dinner is West" (2005) and "Tenancy" (2011) he commissioned music scores by fellow Juilliard graduate Beata Moon. In addition to Moon, he has collaborated with numerous composers and musicians, including Ricardo Llorca and Leslie Wildman as well as designers of different disciplines, e.g. Fabio Toblini.

An excerpt of Rübsam's Monarcas was performed in 2025 at Dancing for Our Wonderful World, a program from vildwerk., a nonprofit organization dedicated to inspiring conservation awareness through dance. Megan LeCrone and Renan Cerdeiro performed.

== Awards ==
Among the many awards Rübsam received are a Jerome L. Greene Fellowship, a Lincoln Center Fellowship, a Manhattan Spirit Award as "best male dancer" in 1997, a choreography award from Stephens College in 2000, an award for his advocacy from Dancers Responding to AIDS in 2004 and the Distinguished Artist Award from Bergen College in 2009, the first time this award was given to a dance artist.

== Stage, film, advocacy and journalism ==
Rübsam also works for theater and opera as both choreographer and director. He has been a guest choreographer and teacher for ballet, contemporary dance companies and universities throughout the Americas as well as in Australasia and Europe. Rübsam was the first speaker on dance for the Gel conference in 2007 and lead a workshop at Gel in 2011. He is a known advocate for his art form and has presented lectures for the Lincoln Center Young Patrons Program. In December 2010 he hosted fellow choreographers Robert Garland, Matthew Neenan and Luca Veggetti for a panel at Juilliard. His dance writing has appeared in The Hudson Review, The Dance Enthusiast, Dance Magazine and its annual Stern's Performing Arts Directory, Pointe Magazine, Ballet Review, The Juilliard Journal and he was the American correspondent for the European publication Dance-for-You. Rübsam appears in the documentary Behind the Curtain and is a long-time board member of the Martha Hill Dance Fund. On the occasion of his company's upcoming 20th anniversary season, Classic Talk conducted a two part interview with Rübsam in the fall of 2011.

== Choreographic development ==
Since working closely with the late Prima Ballerina Assoluta Eva Evdokimova starting in 2000, his choreographic work has incorporated ballet vocabulary. In 2002 he created a highly acclaimed solo work for Evdokimova and in 2004 began introducing point work to his eclectic repertoire, thus attracting dancers from American Ballet Theatre, Dance Theatre of Harlem and New York City Ballet. His company SENSEDANCE premiered his Impending Visit (music: Rafael Aponte-Ledée) in 2009 at the Fiesta Iberoamericana de las Artes in San Juan, Puerto Rico, and he represented the United States as a cultural ambassador at the Danza Nueva Festival in Lima and on a subsequent tour with his company through Peru in 2010. HALF-LIFE (2011) proved a milestone for it successfully tackled movement invention and social commentary in a post-apocalyptic setting inspired by Fukushima. A program featuring duets (2013) showcased Rübsam's ability to portray different kind of relationships by using a wide variety of original movement vocabulary both in ballet and modern/contemporary dance idioms. The lively Sarao with music by Ricardo Llorca paired Erin Ginn with Matt Van, who also appeared with Juan Rodriguez in the male duet Russian Lesson. Heidi Green and Oisin Monaghan floated through the movement poem An einsamer Quelle to Richard Strauss, while the reflective and sculptural Borders (to spoken word) featured Temple Kemezis with Rübsam. Brahms Dances, an ensemble work for the company of ten dancers highlighted the composer's vocal music. 2015 saw another collaboration with composer Moon: And There was Morning gave a hopeful outlook on life for the quartet of dancers exploring the stage space in always evolving forms.

== Teaching career ==
In Fall 2006, he joined the Juilliard faculty, where he implemented a dance history and appreciation program for the general public. Earlier that year he was named Resident Choreographer of the Hartford City Ballet. Since 2019 Rübsam teaches dance history at Fordham University's Lincoln Center campus.

== Dancers and students ==
Among his well-known disciples and guest dancers are Violetta Klimczewska, Ramon Thielen, Andrea Long, Carlos Molina, Dartanion Reed, Christine Reisner, as well as Samuel Lee Roberts and Akua Noni Parker, both with Alvin Ailey American Dance Theater.

== Producer ==
Rübsam produces select events ranging from a tribute to theater critic Eric Bentley at New York City's Town Hall with Tony Kushner, Karyn Levitt, Austin Pendleton, Michael Riedel, and Glen Roven to "RADICAL BODIES: Anna Halprin, Simone Forti, Yvonne Rainer" at Hunter College's Kaye Playhouse and the Beverly Blossom Festival at the 92Y in which he performed alongside Tandy Beal, Betsy Fisher, Debra Noble, and others.

== Quotes ==
"Mr. Rübsam has steadily followed his own drumbeat, though in the case of his cheerfully humanist choreography the sound might more appropriately be that of a flute." (Jennifer Dunning, NYTimes, Oct. 3, 2003)

"HALF-LIFE and Göttingen poignantly tackle the big questions and put Rübsam forth as the Anselm Kiefer of dance." (Lori Ortiz, readingdance.com, June 26, 2011)

== Works ==
His works include:

- Schubert: Lieder (1991)
- After Yet Another Fall (1992) – original music: Beata Moon
- Folk Tales (1992)
- Erect Secrets (1993) – original music: Christopher Buchenholz
- Sand (1993) - music: Chopin
- Kingdom (1993) - music: Bartok
- Lie (1994)
- Sunshine (1994)
- Jephte (1995)
- Ginger: My Story (1995)
- Dolphins and Antelopes (1996) – original music: Beata Moon
- Ode (1996)
- Brass Blues (1997)
- Art of Love (1997) – tribute to Laura Nyro
- Moonpaths (1998) – original music: Beata Moon
- Carousel (1999)
- Rhapsody (1999)
- Be Good (2000)
- Voices of Spring (2000)
- Addicted (2001)
- Brahms: "Double Concerto" (2001)
- Listeners borne as bone (2002) – original music: Kevin James
- The End of Innocence (2002) – music: Ricardo Llorca
- Litanei & Frühlingsglaube (2002) – for Prima Ballerina Eva Evdokimova
- On The Fritz (2002)
- Safari (2002) – music: Beata Moon
- Garden (2003)
- Petit Pas (2003)
- Chorale (2004) - music: Ricardo Llorca
- Django (2004)
- Quartet (2004) – music: Ricardo Llorca
- Herman Sherman' (2004)
- Dinner is West (2005) – original music: Beata Moon
- The Dance Bag (2005)
- Burque Bosque (2006) - music: Beata Moon
- Basie's Basement (2006)
- Merciless Beauty (2006) – music: Leslie Wildman
- Caves (2006) – music: Ricardo Llorca
- Göttingen (2006)
- Amaranthine Road (2007) – music: Beata Moon
- Innocence (2007) – music: Ron Mazurek
- The Secret (2007) – music: Beata Moon
- Inter-Mez-Zo (2008) – music: Beata Moon
- Guernica (2008) – music: Beata Moon
- Final Bell (2008) – music: Ron Mazurek
- Scherzo (2008) – Hartford City Ballet
- Cloudforest (2008) – SENSEDANCE at Alvin Ailey Citigroup Theater – NY, NY
- Impending Visit (2009) – at Festival Fiesta Iberoamericana de las Artes – San Juan, Puerto Rico
- José Antonio (2010) – Danza Nueva Festival – Lima, Peru
- Dvorák 8/3 (2010) – Texas Academy of Ballet
- HALF-LIFE (2011)
- Nonet (2011) - music: Ricardo Llorca
- Tenancy (2011) - original music: Beata Moon
- HALF-LIFE 102 (2012)
- obsession | calm (2012) - music: Ernest Bloch
- Brahms Dances (2012)
- Borders (2013)
- Sarao (2013) - music: Ricardo Llorca
- An einsamer Quelle (2013)
- Russian Lesson (2013)
- And There was Morning (2015) - original music: Beata Moon
- Grand Canyon (2015) - music: Matt Siffert
- Combat del Somni (2015) - music: Ricardo Llorca
- Papa's Porter (2015) - music: Cole Porter, Hildegard Knef
- Blackpatch (2016) - music: Laura Nyro
- Hungarian Dances (2016) - music: Bartok
- SHOALMATES (2018) - music: Mozart
