= Michael Blackwood (filmmaker) =

German–American documentary filmmaker

- Born: Michael Blackwood; July 15, 1934; Breslau, Gau Silesia, Germany
- Died: February 24, 2023 (aged 88)
- Occupation: Documentary filmmaker
- Years active: 1959–2023

Michael Blackwood (July 15, 1934 – February 24, 2023) was a German-born American independent documentary filmmaker who founded Blackwood Productions, now known as Michael Blackwood Productions, in 1966.

== Early years ==
Blackwood was born in Breslau, Germany, on July 15, 1934. In 1949, the family relocated to New York City.

== Career ==
Blackwood's first film experience came at the NBC Special Films Unit where he worked under the editor Isaac Kleinerman to make documentary films such as Broadway Express (1957–1959). Blackwood's fly on the wall approach in this early short film marked the starting point of the observational filmmaking style he would become known for. Later he worked as a freelance producer-director for German Television to make documentary films about cultural news subjects, which would result in ongoing collaborations with them during his independent film career.

With the help of his brother Christian, Michael created Blackwood Productions in 1966, a production company dedicated to making films about art, music, and the cultural landscape in New York City. Blackwood's main aim was to document the New York art scene unfolding around him in the 1960s and 1970s.

Starting with his documentation of Christo's Wrapped Coast project in Little Bay, Australia in 1969, Blackwood began a series of monographic films with artists such as David Hockney, Robert Motherwell, Philip Guston, Isamu Noguchi, Roy Lichtenstein, Andy Warhol, Claes Oldenburg, George Segal, Jim Dine, Jasper Johns, and Robert Rauschenberg. He also directed film surveys with dozens of participants, covering subjects such as the New York School of painting, abstract expressionism, pop art, American art in the 1960s and 70s, postmodern choreography, modern sculpture and postmodern architecture.

Blackwood's first film on the subject of New York City was his silent short film titled Broadway Express (1959), an intimate, action-filled portrait of the city's subway system, highlighting its diverse ridership. Staying true to his observational filmmaking style, Blackwood hit the streets and made Summer in the City (1969), a film documenting the culture of the Upper West Side of Manhattan. The film, conceived by Christian Blackwood and narrated by Uwe Johnson, followed a block party organized by the Peace and Freedom Party, protestors outside City Hall, old age home residents, two heroin addicts, drag pageant contestants, and many others, making it a diverse display of New York City life. In 1985, Michael completed his feature documentation of New York City, the monstrous Empire City (1985), a look at the political, economic, and social state of Manhattan with appearances from David Rockefeller, Norman Mailer, Ed Koch, Phillip Johnson, Keith Haring, Jane Jacobs, Joseph Papp, Donald Trump, Brooke Astor, and Herman Badillo, among others. The film took an honest look at the economic disparities between the rich and the poor, political struggles, and the ever-present art scene that defined New York City in the 1980s. The Blackwoods might be most well known for their two monographic cinema verité films Monk (1968) and Monk in Europe (1968), documenting legendary jazz pianist Thelonious Monk. Some of this footage was featured in the Charlotte Zwerin documentary Thelonious Monk: Straight, No Chaser (1988), which was executive produced by Clint Eastwood. The original footage of Monk, which followed him in New York, Atlanta, and on tour in Europe, is some of the only existing footage of the musician in action.

The two brothers worked side by side until 1982 when Christian decided to go his own way and produce his own films. Michael renamed Blackwood Productions to Michael Blackwood Productions in 1982, and occasionally collaborated with Christian on films even after Christian's departure. With his new production company also based in New York, Christian Blackwood made a dozen films during a ten-year period before his death in 1992. Michael Blackwood Productions expanded to encompass the subject of architecture with the film Beyond Utopia: Changing Attitudes in American Architecture (1983) and went on to document the works of many other architects including Frank Gehry, Zaha Hadid, Arata Isozaki, and Richard Meier.

Michael Blackwood directed and produced over 50 films between 1983 and 1999 under Michael Blackwood Productions, and since 2000, an even greater number, largely split between the subjects of art and architecture.

== Death ==
Blackwood died on February 24, 2023, at the age of 88.

== Legacy ==
Michael Blackwood created over 150 films covering art, architecture, dance, music, history, and culture with such figures as Thelonious Monk, Philip Guston, Zaha Hadid, Francis Bacon, Philip Glass, Laurie Anderson, and Andy Warhol. Blackwood helped define a cinema verité observational style of filmmaking that was practiced by such contemporaries as Albert Maysles and D.A. Pennebaker. His diverse array of films and subjects contain a common thread of didacticism and austerity, favoring pure reporting over the art of filmmaking. Blackwood's core belief is that in the cinema lies the power to enlighten the viewer, and thus reconcile the masses with the art of the postwar world.
