= Beata Moon =

Korean-American classical pianist and composer (born 1969)

- Born: 1969 (age 56–57)
- Origin: North Dakota and Indiana
- Occupations: composer, pianist, educator
- Years active: 1977-present
- Labels: BiBimBop; Naxos
- Website: http://www.beatamoon.com

Beata Moon (born 1969) is a Korean-American classical pianist and composer.

== Biography ==
Moon was born in North Dakota and raised in Indiana. She made her musical debut at age 8 with the Indianapolis Symphony Orchestra. Moon trained as a pianist at the Juilliard School with Adele Marcus earning both her bachelor's and master's degrees there. She is self-taught as a composer.

== Work ==
Moon's compositions are compared to post-minimalist, but defy a strict definition of genre.

She released Perigee & Apogee in 2001 on the Albany label and Earthshine on her own label, Bibimbop Records in 2004. In 2007, Naxos Records added a CD of her works for solo piano, performed by Moon herself, to their catalog of important 21st-century composers. Her work has been acclaimed by Kyle Gann, Gramophone, Allmusic, and others.

Moon has frequently collaborated with choreographer Henning Rübsam and his company SENSEDANCE. "After Yet Another Fall" (1992), "Dolphins and Antelopes" (1996), "Moonpaths" (1998), "Dinner is West" (2005) and "Tenancy" (2011) are among her commissions for the company. Rübsam choreographed to other works by Moon, including her "In Transit" from 1999 which was used for the choreographer's "Amaranthine Road" (2007).

She also has gained notability for performing a series of "Whodunit?" concerts at such venues as the Kennedy Center, in which the program notes are not provided until the end of the concert.

== The Beata Moon Ensemble ==
The Beata Moon Ensemble debuted on February 22, 2002, at Columbia University's Miller Theatre with Lara St. John as the featured soloist.

- Beata Moon, piano
- Tara Helen O'Connor, flute
- Jacqueline Leclair, oboe
- Marianne Gythfeldt, clarinet
- Ann Ellsworth, french horn
- Laura Koepke, bassoon (adjunct instructor of music at Western Connecticut State University)

== Discography ==
=== Perigee & Apogee (Jan 1, 2000) ===
- Safari (2000) - performed by Beata Moon/David Fedele/Tom Chiu/Makoto Nakura/Thomas Kolor
- Piano Fantasy (1998) - performed by Beata Moon
- Moonpaths (1998) - performed by Beata Moon/Alan R. Kay/Karen Marx
- Submerged (1999) - performed by Beata Moon
- Antelope Vamp (1996) - performed by Beata Moon/Tom Chiu/Makoto Nakura/Thomas Kolor
- Winter Sky (1996) - performed by Beata Moon/Chin Kim
- In Transit (1999) - performed by Beata Moon
- Mary (1996) - performed by Beata Moon/Joan La Barbara/Tom Chiu/Danny Mallon
- Prelude (1996) - performed by Beata Moon

=== Earthshine (Nov 20, 2004) ===
- Movement (2002)
- Illusions (2000)
- Nursery (1996)
- Guernica (2003)
- String Quartet: Homage to Béla (2000)
- 1,2,3 (2002)
- Vignettes (2003/04)
- 3 Songs for My Parents [ 1 Corinthians 13, John 3:16, Psalm 121](1996)
- Shall I Compare Thee to a Summer's Day (2000)
- Wind Quintet (2004)

=== Piano Works (Jun 26, 2007) ===
- Piano Sonata (2006)
- Submerged (1999)
- In Transit (1999)
- Guernica (2003)
- Inter-Mez-Zo (2006)
- Tocatta (2000)
- Ode (1998)
- Piano Fantasy (1998)
- Nursery (1996)
- The Secret (2005)
- Prelude (1996)

== Sources ==
- Kourlas, Gia (November 10, 2008). "Good Looks, Classical and Cloudy". The New York Times.
- Hsu, Andrea (December 30, 2021). “A Musician in New York”. “NPR”.
