= Gladys Bailin =

American choreographer

- Born: February 11, 1930; New York, New York, United States
- Known for: Dance and choreography
- Movement: Modern/contemporary dance
- Spouse: Murray P. Stern

Gladys Bailin (born 1930) is a choreographer, dancer, and instructor. She studied and worked at the Henry Street Playhouse in New York, joined the avant-garde, modern dance company of Alwin Nikolais and later taught at and became the first female Distinguished Professor at Ohio University.

== Early life and career ==
Gladys Bailin was born in New York City on February 11, 1930. As a child she took piano, dance, and voice classes. At age eight she began attending classes at the Henry Street Playhouse. She trained and worked at the Playhouse from the 1940s into the 1960s. At the Henry Street Playhouse Bailin met Alwin Nikolais in 1948. She graduated from Hunter College in 1952. She performed with the Nikolais company as well as the Murray Louis Dance Company. She toured with both companies throughout the United States and internationally.

== Teaching ==
From 1966 to 1972, Bailin taught at the New York University School of the Arts (now the Tisch School). During the 1960s she also performed with Don Redlich and company. She joined Ohio University in 1972 to develop the dance program. She was the Director of the School of Dance there from 1983 to 1995. Bailin influenced scores of students over the years. The duo Dancenoise, Anne Iobst and Lucy Sexton, studied with Bailin at Ohio University and became a staple of the East Village nightclub scene in the 1980s. They cited the Nikolais influenced dance instruction of Bailin leading to their interest in using props, visuals, and costumes in their performances.

== See also ==
- Women in dance
