= Roberts Blossom =

American actor and poet (1924–2011)

- Blossom in 2010
- Born: Roberts Scott Blossom; March 25, 1924; New Haven, Connecticut, U.S.
- Died: July 8, 2011 (aged 87); Santa Monica, California, U.S.
- Occupations: Actor; poet
- Years active: 1955–2000
- Spouses: Beverly Schmidt Blossom (m. 1966; div. 1970); Marilyn Orshan (m. 1970; died 1982)
- Children: 2

Roberts Scott Blossom (March 25, 1924 – July 8, 2011) was an American poet and character actor of theater, film, and television. He is best known for his roles as Old Man Marley in Home Alone (1990) and as Ezra Cobb in the horror film Deranged (1974). Blossom is also remembered for his supporting roles in films such as The Great Gatsby (1974), Close Encounters of the Third Kind (1977), Escape from Alcatraz (1979), Christine (1983), and The Last Temptation of Christ (1988).

== Early life ==
Roberts Scott Blossom was born on March 25, 1924, in New Haven, Connecticut, to John Blossom, an athletic director at Yale University. He was raised in Cleveland, but later moved to Shaker Heights, Ohio. Blossom attended Hawken School and graduated from Asheville School in 1941 and attended Harvard University for a year until he joined the United States Army and served in World War II in Europe. Blossom trained as a therapist and later decided to be an actor. He began directing and acting in productions at Karamu House and the Candlelight Theater in Cleveland. Blossom later moved to New York City, where he supported himself by bundling feathers for hats, and practicing Dianetics. Blossom also waited tables until he became a full-time actor.

== Career ==
Blossom began acting on stage during the 1950s. He won three Obie Awards for his performances in the off-Broadway plays Village Wooing (1955), which was his debut, Do Not Pass Go (1965) and The Ice Age (1976). During the 1960s, Blossom formed Filmstage, a multimedia avant garde theatrical troupe. His Broadway credits include Ballad of the Sad Cafe and Operation Sidewinder and in 1988 he appeared in Peter Brook's production of The Cherry Orchard.

Blossom began appearing on screen in 1958. His first appearance in a feature film was in 1971's The Hospital starring George C. Scott and written by Paddy Chayefsky. In the 1970s, Blossom had roles in films including Slaughterhouse-Five (1972), The Great Gatsby (1974) starring Robert Redford and Mia Farrow, Steven Spielberg's Close Encounters of the Third Kind (1977), and Escape from Alcatraz (1979) starring Clint Eastwood. Escape from Alcatraz is perhaps Blossom's best-known supporting role for the scene where he chopped off his fingers with an axe.

Blossom is remembered for his role as Ezra Cobb in the 1974 horror film Deranged based on American murderer Ed Gein. According to the 2014 book Mad as Hell: The Making of Network and the Fateful Vision of the Angriest Man in Movies by David Itzkoff, the cast of Chayefsky's multiple Oscar-winning film Network originally included Blossom as media mogul Arthur Jensen. However, he was replaced in pre-production by Ned Beatty.

Blossom is also known for starring in the 1983 horror film Christine, a film directed by John Carpenter which is an adaptation of the book by Stephen King. Blossom is best known for his role in the 1990 film Home Alone, where he played Old Man Marley alongside Macaulay Culkin. He appeared in his final film role in 1995 alongside Sharon Stone and Leonardo DiCaprio in The Quick and The Dead (1995). Blossom's other film credits include Resurrection (1980) starring Ellen Burstyn, Reuben, Reuben (1983), Flashpoint (1984), Vision Quest (1985) starring Matthew Modine and Linda Fiorentino, The Last Temptation of Christ (1988), Always (1989), and Doc Hollywood (1991) starring Michael J. Fox.

In 1958, Blossom made his first television appearance in the television series Naked City. From 1976 to 1978, Blossom starred on the television soap opera Another World, for which he won a Soapy Award for Best Villain. Blossom's other television credits include Moonlighting, with Cybill Shepherd and Bruce Willis, Tales from the Darkside, The Equalizer, the revived 1980s version of The Twilight Zone and Chicago Hope. His television films include Family Reunion, with Bette Davis, the 1985 version of Noon Wine, Murder in the Heartland and Disney's Balloon Farm, which was his final role as an actor.

In 2000, Blossom appeared in the biography documentary Full Blossom: The Life of Poet/Actor Roberts Blossom, in which he talked about his life as an actor and poet. The documentary also featured his children Debbie and Michael, his first wife Beverly, and Ed Asner, Peter Brook and Robert Frank.

== Personal life ==
Blossom was formerly married to Beverly Schmidt Blossom, with whom he had a son. She died on November 1, 2014 of cancer. Blossom was later married to Marylin Orshan Blossom until her death in 1982, with whom he had a daughter.

After Blossom retired from acting in the late 1990s, he moved to Berkeley, California, and spent his time writing poetry.

== Death ==
Blossom later moved to Santa Monica, where he died from cerebrovascular disease on July 8, 2011, at age 87. Blossom was residing in a nursing home at the time of his death.

== Filmography ==
=== Film ===
Title	Year	Role	Director
Echo of an Era (short)	1959	Unnamed/unknown	Henry Freeman
The Sins of Jesus (short)	1961	Unnamed/unknown	Robert Frank
The Hospital	1971	Guernsey	Arthur Hiller
The Witches of Salem: The Horror and the Hope (short)	1972	Gov. Phips	Dennis Azzarella
Slaughterhouse-Five	1972	Wild Bob Cody	George Roy Hill
Please Stand by	1972	Judge Nott	Jack Milton; Joanna Milton
Deranged	1974	Ezra Cobb	Alan Ormsby; Jeff Gillen
The Great Gatsby	1974	Mr. Gatz	Jack Clayton
Handle with Care	1977	Papa Thermodyne	Jonathan Demme
Close Encounters of the Third Kind	1977	Farmer	Steven Spielberg
Escape from Alcatraz	1979	Chester 'Doc' Dalton	Don Siegel
Resurrection	1980	John Harper	Daniel Petrie
Christine	1983	George LeBay	John Carpenter
Reuben, Reuben	1983	Frank Spofford	Robert Ellis Miller
Flashpoint	1984	Amarillo	William Tannen
Vision Quest	1985	Harry Swain	Harold Becker
Candy Mountain	1987	Archie	Robert Frank; Rudy Wurlitzer
The Last Temptation of Christ	1988	Aged Master	Martin Scorsese
Always	1989	Dave	Steven Spielberg
Home Alone	1990	Old Man Marley	Chris Columbus
Doc Hollywood	1991	Judge Evans	Michael Caton-Jones
Death Falls	1991	Hals Johnson	June Samson
The Quick and the Dead	1995	Doc Walter Wallace	Sam Raimi
Full Blossom: The Life of Poet/Actor Roberts Blossom	2000	Himself (documentary)	James Brih Abee

=== Television ===
Title	Year	Role	Notes
Studio One	1957	First Refugee	Season 10, episode 11
Naked City	1958	Brissen (uncredited)	Season 1, episode 5
Naked City	1958	Quint Butcher	Season 1, episode 13
The DuPont Show of the Month	1959–1961	Billy Budd	Season 2, episode 9
The DuPont Show of the Month	1959–1961	Gustav	Season 4, episode 5
The Art Carney Show	1959	Simon Stimson	Season 1, episode 2
Camera Three	1959	Himself	Season 4, episode 46
John Brown's Raid	1960	Stevens	Television film
The Robert Herridge Theater	1960	(unknown role)	Season 1, episode 26
The Eleventh Hour	1962	Schizophrenic	Season 1, episode 1
Brenner	1964	Reader	Season 2, episode 10
The Defenders	1964	Thomas Riggs	Season 4, episode 4
Great Performances	1972	Judge / Preacher	New York Playhouse (episode 2)
Beacon Hill	1975	D.W. Griffith	Season 1, episode 10
The Adams Chronicles	1976	Carver	Miniseries (episode 4)
Another World	1976–1978	Bert Ordway	
Another World	1976–1978	Sven Petersen	Soapy Award for Best Villain (1978)
Mourning Becomes Electra	1978	Seth	Part of Great Performances (Season 6)
ABC Weekend Special	1980	Mr. LeGrand	Season 3, episodes 9 & 10
Family Reunion	1981	Phil King	Television film
The Wall	1982	Kuchaski	Television film
Johnny Belinda	1982	John McAdam	Television film
Airwolf	1984	Old Nan with Dog (uncredited)	Season 2, episode 11
American Playhouse	1985	Mr. McClellan	Season 4, episode 6
Amazing Stories	1985	Opa Globe	Season 1, episode 1
The Twilight Zone	1985–1987	The Man	Season 1, episode 8 (segment b)
The Twilight Zone	1985–1987	Mordecai Hawkline	Season 2, episode 11 (segment a)
Moonlighting	1986	Lawrence Everette	Season 2, episode 15
Tales from the Darkside	1986	Inquisitor	Season 3, episode 7
The Equalizer	1986	Oscar Peabody	Season 2, episode 9 "Tip on a Sure Thing"
At Mother's Request	1987	Doug Steele	Miniseries (2 episodes)
Stingray	1987	Uncle Pat 'The Cat' Morel	Season 2, episode 4
In the Heat of the Night	1989	Dr. Harris Pendleton	Season 2, episode 10
Northern Exposure	1992	Ned Svenborg	Season 3, episode 23 "Cicely"
The Habitation of Dragons	1992	Mr. Charlie	Television film
Crossroads	1992	Oscar Poland	Season 1, episode 1
The American Clock	1993	Old Wayne Taylor	Television film
Murder in the Heartland	1993	Gus Meyer	Miniseries (2 episodes)
Chicago Hope	1997	William Kronk	Season 3, episode 26
Balloon Farm	1999	'Weasel' Mayfield	Television film

== Theater credits ==
- 1955: Village Wooing
- 1958: The Infernal Machine (Anubis)
- 1961: A Cook for Mr. General (Kroy)
- 1963: The Ballad of the Sad Cafe (Merlie Ryan)
- 1964: The Physicists
- 1965: Do Not Pass Go
- 1970: Operation Sidewinder
- 1973: Statis Quo Vadis (Mr. Elgin)
- 1988: The Cherry Orchard
- 1989: The Chairs (Old Man)

== Bibliography ==
- J O & Y Bookies (2001).
- Poetic Philosophy in the 21st Century (2002).
- River of Wine (2002).
- How It Is We (2002).
