= Gerald A. Miller =

American agronomist

Gerald Arey Miller (born 1943) is an American agronomist, professor, and associate dean emeritus at Iowa State University, former director of its Agriculture and Natural Resources Extension, and former Project Director for the Heartland Regional Water Coordination Initiative in Iowa. He held the rank of Major General in the United States Army.

== Academic and professional timeline (1969-present) ==
Miller received his Bachelor of Science degree in Agronomy at Virginia Polytechnic Institute in 1965, followed by a Master of Science in Soil Science at Iowa State University in 1971. He went on to receive his Ph.D. in Soil Science at Iowa State University in 1974 and served as a graduate research assistant (1969–1971) and research associate (1971–1974) while working on his M.S. (1971) and Ph.D. (1974). On December 1, 1974, he was appointed as an assistant professor and Iowa State University Extension Agronomist (1974–1977). He continued to be the Extension Agronomist until 1998. After receiving tenure, Miller became an associate professor in 1977, and was promoted to professor in 1983. In 1998, Miller became the Associate Dean of Extension Programs and Outreach at the College of Agriculture and Life Sciences until 2010. From 2004-2010, he maintained the position of Iowa State University Director of Agriculture and Natural Resources Extension. In June 2010, he was appointed interim Vice President for Extension and Outreach at Iowa State University until 2011. He continued research as a professor of agronomy until June 2011, and became both Professor and Associate Dean Emeritus at Iowa State University in July 2011, where he continues to work.

== Program and appointment duties ==
From 1974 to 2011 Miller represented Iowa State University Extension as a member of the Iowa Cooperative Soil Survey Program. Program activities included soil and land use interpretations, delivery of soil survey education, and supplying information to clients and leadership for the Iowa Soil Properties and Interpretation Database (ISPAID) and the Iowa Soil and Land Use website: http://www.extension.iastate.edu/soils/. Under the appointment in Iowa State University Extension, Miller focused on providing direction and guidance for extension-related projects concerning water quality using applied studies and implementation. Through Iowa State University's Extension Program, Miller coordinated extensions of work and outreach programs, as well as served as the College of Agriculture's liaison for natural resource programs with state and federal agencies. Miller's colleagues, affiliates, and associations in agri-business and economic development organizations also helped to coordinate extension programs. In addition to his appointment in Extension, Miller was also a highly honored Professor in Agronomy and Associate Dean at Iowa State University.

== Professional activities and interests ==
From his start in graduate school and throughout his career in academia and research, Miller has been affiliated with several professional organizations and societies. He cherished university teaching, public speaking, and grant writing on various topics about water quality laws, policy, environmental science, and sustainability of the environment. Honor organizations he belonged to are as follows: Gamma Sigma Delta, Sigma Xi, and Alpha Zeta. Other organizations he was a member of include: the American Society of Agronomy, Soil Science Society of America, International Society of Soil Science, Geological Society of America, American Quaternary Association, Soil and Water Conservation Society, Professional Soil Classifiers of Iowa, and the Iowa Academy of Science.

== Professional involvements and certifications ==
From 2002 to 2010, Miller served as the Project Director for the Heartland Regional Water Coordination Initiative in the state of Iowa through Iowa State University Extension. The Heartland Initiative consisted of mostly professionals (water quality coordinators, extension and research faculty) from multiple land grant universities such as Iowa State University, Kansas State University, the University of Missouri, and the University of Nebraska-Lincoln. A representative for the United States Environmental Protection Agency Region 7 Watershed Planning and Implementation Branch was also a part of this coalition. Professionals from all focuses of the environment were present in this organization (departments consisting of agronomy, forestry, agricultural engineering, economics, and sociology). The purpose of the Heartland Regional Water Coordination Initiative was to “build institutional partnerships and increase the capacity of citizens, landowners, agencies, and community leaders to better address water quality concerns.” Areas of interest include animal manure management, pesticide and nutrient management, and watershed management. As Project Director, Dr. Miller encouraged Extension faculty and staff to participate in issue teams and working groups for multiple responsibilities involving planning, managing and implementing Heartland-sponsored roundtables and workshops and being authors of regional publications and newsletters. He is a certified Professional Soil Scientist (CPSS) via the certification program of the Soil Science Society of America . Work of a soil scientist involves meeting with landowners and the general public and holding private consultation services for the classification, evaluation, and interpretation of soils and soil landscapes.

== Military service ==
He spent 33 years in uniform serving on active duty and in the Army National Guard. He was commissioned as a 2nd Lieutenant of the United States Army in the Reserve Officers' Training Corps (ROTC) after receiving his bachelor's degree in 1965 at Virginia Polytechnic Institute and State University. He served on active duty for 32 months from 1965 through 1968, commanded the Army National Guard units at company, battalion and brigade level during the 1970s and 1980s, served as Deputy Commanding General (Reserve Components) for the First United States Army from 1993 to 1995 and commanded the 34th Infantry Division from 1995 to 1998. He was promoted to the rank Major General, United States Army, in November 1993 and held this rank until his retirement in 1998. He was awarded the Army's Distinguished Service Medal in 1998.

== Academic achievements ==
A national water resource team award has been renamed the Gerald A. Miller Outreach Team Award. The award recognizes Miller's contributions to the protection and enhancement of water resources in the United States. Miller, who has been appointed Interim Head of Iowa State University Extension, was recognized at an awards ceremony during the 2010 National Water Conference in South Carolina. The award was renamed by the U.S. Department of Agriculture National Institute for Food and Agriculture and the Committee for Shared Leadership in Water Resources. Miller was Project Director of the Heartland Regional Water Coordination Initiative in the state of Iowa through Iowa State University Extension from 2002 through 2010.

He author or co-author of more than 130 publications and products including 10 refereed journal articles, 36 conference proceedings and technical reports, 81 extension publications, one textbook, two book chapters, four audiovisuals, numerous newsletter articles and provides leadership for the Iowa Soil and Land Use website: http://www.extension.iastate.edu/soils/ Recent publications include:

Burras, C.L., G.A. Miller, T.E. Fenton, and A.M. Sassman. 2015. Corn Suitability Rating 2 (CSR2) and Component Values. Iowa State University Extension and Outreach Soil and Land Use website April 2015. 4 pages.

Al-Kaisi, Mahdi M., Roger W. Elmore, Gerald A. Miller, and David Kwaw-Mensah. 2015. Extension Agriculture and Natural Resources in the U.S. Midwest: A Review and Analysis of Challenges and Future Opportunities. Natural Sciences Education 44:26-33. doi:10.4195/nse2014.10.0022 (Open Access).

Miller, Gerald. 2015. Corn Suitability Ratings: An Update. pp. 30–31. In Brent Pringnitz (ed.). Crop Advantage Series Proceedings. AEP 0200. Iowa State University Extension and Outreach, Ames, Iowa. 35 pages.

Miller, Gerald A. 2013. Soil Judging in Iowa. PM 1106. Iowa State University Extension and Outreach Ames, Iowa. 24 pages Soil judging consists of evaluating certain properties of a soil and translating these evaluations into recommendations for land use. This booklet is a guide for making these evaluations and interpretations. The manual is written for high school students and others interested in evaluating and interpreting the physical, chemical and biological properties of soil profiles.

Miller, Gerald (2013). What are Soils Made of and How Soils Develop. pp. 15–17, In Samuel Bernard (ed.) Getting Into Soil and Water. Iowa Water Center, Ames, Iowa. An overview article that discusses physical, chemical and biological components of soils, soil forming factors and the range of age of soils that occur on Iowa landscapes.

Morton, Lois Wright, and Gerald A. Miller. 2010. Heartland: Where Water Matters. Accomplishments of the Heartland Regional Water Coordination Initiative. Department of Sociology, Iowa State University. 19 pages. A summary report of the initiatives and accomplishments of the four state (IA, KS, MO, NE) Heartland Regional Water Coordination Initiative, a project funded by USDA, National Institute for Food and Agriculture, for the period 2002 through 2010.

Rodecap, John, Chad Ingels, Susan Brown, Lois Wright Morton, and Gerald A. Miller, 2008: Performance Incentives Enable Stewardship Ethic and Systems Approach to Environmental Protection. In Proceedings of 2008 USDA-CSREES National Water Quality Conference. “Research, Extension and Education for Water Quality and Quantity”. February 3–6, 2008. Sparks, NV. Abstract and presentation

Rodecap, John, Chad Ingels, Susan Brown and Gerald A. Miller, 2007: Watershed Resident Determination of Performance-based Environmental Management Incentives. In Proceedings of 2007 USDA-CSREES National Water Quality Conference. “Research, Extension and Education for Water Quality and Quantity”. January 28-February 1, 2007. Savannah, GA. Abstract and presentation

Morton, Lois Wright, John Rodecap, Susan Brown and Gerald A. Miller, 2006: Performance-based Environmental Management: The Hewitt Creek Model. Pm 2013. University Extension, Iowa State University, Ames, IA 4 pp.

Ingels, Chad, John Rodecap, and Gerald Miller, 2005: Manure, Phosphorus and Nitrogen Management Strategies for Iowa Crop and Livestock Farms. In Proceedings of 2005 Agriculture and the Environment Conference. University Extension, Iowa State University, Ames. Manuscript and PowerPoint presentation
