= Leslie Wildman =

American composer

Leslie Wildman is an American composer, who grew up in Lake Bluff, Illinois.

== Biography ==
Leslie Wildman grew up outside Chicago in Lake Bluff, Illinois She studied piano with Ellen Graff Mehegan. Her first composition teacher was William O. Smith at the University of Washington, Seattle, Washington. She moved to Berkeley, California where she studied with Andrew Imbrie. In 1986, she received a Masters in Music Composition from the University of California, Berkeley. After completing her education, Ms. Wildman worked briefly as an orchestrator for the film composer, Laurence Rosenthal. She has worked with the choreographer Henning Rübsam, whose dance company SENSEDANCE is based in New York. She presently divides her time between New York City and the San Francisco Bay Area. Major works include Overture to a Wink for large orchestra premiered in 1987 in Berkeley, California; Let Me Not Mar for soprano, oboe and piano, premiered in 1988 at the Aspen Music Festival; and Solo Flight, a theater work for soprano and electronics based on Amelia Earhart's flight across the Atlantic, premiered in 1995 in Vienna, Austria.

== Sources ==
- Collingridge, Caroline (June, 1995). "Vienna Congress Report Female Music Rush-Hour: The Ninth International Congress on Women in Music". IAWM Journal.
- La Rocco, Claudia (October 25, 2006). "A Choreographer’s Love-Hate Relationship With Ballet". New York Times.
