= CBS Workshop =

CBS Workshop, a.k.a. CBS Repertoire Workshop is an hour-long dramatic television anthology series that was produced by and aired on CBS mid-day on Sundays in the 1960s. There were a total of twenty-five episodes with guest stars that included Maureen Stapleton, Raul Davila, Ossie Davis, Larry Hagman, Fritz Weaver, and Andrew Prine. Collaborators from the realm of opera included the conductor Alfredo Antonini and the soprano Martina Arroyo.

Contributors from the world of modern American dance included Alwin Nikolais, Murray Louis and Ruth Page

Among its writers were Lewis John Carlino and Robert Herridge.
