= Evelyn J. Weber =

American biochemist, and agronomist

Evelyn Joyce Weber
- Born: November 9, 1928; Tower Hill, IL
- Died: October 19, 2008 (aged 79)
- Education: University of Illinois Urbana-Champaign (BS); Iowa State University (PhD)

Evelyn Joyce Weber (1928 - 2008) was an American biochemist, and agronomist. She was a Fellow of the American Institute of Chemists and the first woman to be a faculty member of the Agronomy Department at the University of Illinois Urbana-Champaign.

== Early life and education ==
Evelyn Joyce Weber was born on Nov. 9, 1928, in Tower Hill, IL. She was the daughter of John Weber and Emma Schoch Weber.

Weber graduated from Pana High School and then attended the University of Illinois Urbana-Champaign where she received her BS in Chemistry in 1952. She continued at Illinois as a research assistant in plant lipid research before going on to complete her Ph.D. in Biochemistry at Iowa State University. She then returned to Illinois as a research associate in biochemistry. In 1965, she became the University of Illinois' first woman in the Agronomy Department. Evelyn was a Professor of Plant Biochemistry from 1965 to 1987, and throughout most of her career she was the only woman in the faculty of that department. She retired in 1987 as a biochemist under a joint appointment from the U of I and the United States Department of Agriculture (USDA) as well as a professor emerita in the agronomy department and a freelance editor and biochemical consultant.

Some of her papers are held at the University of Illinois Archives, and others at the Iowa State University archives. She also has a paver in her honor in the Plaza of Heroines at Iowa State University (paver:22 and D:6 on the map).

== Research ==
Weber was a plant biochemist. During her research career she had a focus on plant metabolism, and on the development of high-oil corn.

== Honors ==
Fellowships:

- American Institute of Chemists

Memberships:

- American Chemical Society
- American Oil Chemists Society
- Farm Bureau in Christian County
- National Committee of Women Chemists
- Honorary Member:
  - Alpha Lambda Delta
  - Iota Sigma Pi
  - Sigma Delta Epsilon
  - Phi Kappa Phi
  - Sigma Xi
  - Gamma Sigma Delta

== Works ==
Carter, H. E.; Galanos, D. S.; Gigg, R. H.; Law, J. H.; Nakayama, T.; Smith, D. B., D. B.; Weber, E. J. (1957). "Sphingolipides". Federation Proceedings. 16 (3): 817–824. PMID 13480365.

Carter, H. E.; Celmer, W. D.; Galanos, D. S.; Gigg, R. H.; Lands, W. E. M.; Law, J. H.; Mueller, K. L.; Nakayama, T.; Tomizawa, H. H.; Weber, E. (1958). "Biochemistry of the sphingolipides. X. Phytoglycolipide, a complex phytosphingosine-containing lipide from plant seeds". Journal of the American Oil Chemists' Society. 35 (7): 335–343. doi:10.1007/BF02640547. hdl:2027.42/141721. S2CID 84489673.

Carter, H. E.; Gigg, R. H.; Law, J. H.; Nakayama, T.; Weber, E. J. (1958). "Biochemistry of the sphingolipides. XI. Structure of phytoglycolipide". The Journal of Biological Chemistry. 233 (6): 1309–1314. doi:10.1016/S0021-9258(18)49332-5. PMID 13610833.

Hearn, W. R.; Weber, E. J.; Randolph, P. W.; Barks, N. E. (1961). "Corticotropin Releasing Activity of Synthetic Lysine Vasopressin". Experimental Biology and Medicine. 107 (3). SAGE Publications: 515–517. doi:10.3181/00379727-107-26672. ISSN 1535-3702. PMID 13712598. S2CID 31921962.

Carter, H. E.; Johnson, P.; Weber, E. J. (1965). "Glycolipids". Annual Review of Biochemistry. 34: 109–142. doi:10.1146/annurev.bi.34.070165.000545. PMID 14321165.

Johnson, P.; Weber, E. J.; Carter, H. E.; Krober, M. S. (1965). "Detection of phospholipids on paper chromatograms by neutron activation". Journal of Lipid Research. 6 (3): 425–426. doi:10.1016/S0022-2275(20)39312-3. PMID 14336212.

Carter, H. E.; Weber, E. J. (1966). "Preparation and properties of various salt forms of plant phosphatidyl inositols". Lipids. 1 (1): 16–20. doi:10.1007/BF02668119. PMID 17805680. S2CID 4056288.

Weber, E. J. (1969). "Lipids of maturing grain of corn (Zea mays L.): I. Changes in lipid classes and fatty acid composition". Journal of the American Oil Chemists' Society. 46 (9): 485–488. doi:10.1007/BF02544374. PMID 5808507. S2CID 34905028.

Stoller, E. W.; Weber, E. J. (1970). "Lipid Constituents of Some Common Weed Seeds". Journal of Agricultural and Food Chemistry. 18 (3): 361–364. Bibcode:1970JAFC...18..361S. doi:10.1021/jf60169a005. PMID 5487086.

Weber, E. J. (1970). "Lipids of maturing grain of corn (Zea mays L.): - II. Changes in polar lipids". Journal of the American Oil Chemists' Society. 47 (9): 340–343. doi:10.1007/BF02638998. PMID 5506690. S2CID 31445299.

De La Roche, I. A.; Weber, E. J.; Alexander, D. E. (1971). "The selective utilization of diglyceride species into maize triglycerides". Lipids. 6 (8). John Wiley & Sons, Ltd: 537–540. doi:10.1007/BF02531132. ISSN 0024-4201. PMID 27519512. S2CID 4043278.

De La Roche, I. A.; Weber, E. J.; Alexander, D. E. (1971). "Effects of fatty acid concentration and positional specificity on maize triglyceride structure". Lipids. 6 (8): 531–536. doi:10.1007/BF02531131. PMID 27519511. S2CID 4017885.

De La Roche, I. A.; Weber, E. J.; Alexander, D. E. (1971). "The selective utilization of diglyceride species into maize triglycerides". Lipids. 6 (8): 537–540. doi:10.1007/BF02531132. PMID 27519512. S2CID 4043278.

Weber, E. J.; De La Roche, A.; Alexander, D. E. (1971). "Erratum". Lipids. 6 (9): 692. doi:10.1007/BF02531535. S2CID 263986890.

Weber, E. J.; De La Roche, A.; Alexander, D. E. (1971). "Stereospecific analysis of maize triglycerides". Lipids. 6 (8): 525–530. doi:10.1007/BF02531130. PMID 27519510. S2CID 4003755.

Stoller, E. W.; Weber, E. J.; Wax, L. M. (1973). "The effects of herbicides on soybean seed constituents". Journal of Environmental Quality. 2 (2): 241–244. Bibcode:1973JEnvQ...2..241S. doi:10.2134/jeq1973.00472425000200020015x.

Weber, E. J.; Alexander, D. E. (1975). "Breeding for lipid composition in corn". Journal of the American Oil Chemists' Society. 52 (9): 370–373. doi:10.1007/BF02639199. S2CID 55768256.

Weber, E. J. (1973). "Changes in structure of triglycerides from maturing kernels of corn". Lipids. 8 (5): 295–302. doi:10.1007/BF02531908. PMID 27519879. S2CID 4011721.

Seyfried, T. N.; Weber, E. J.; Daniel, W. L. (1976). "Absence of brain ganglioside abnormalities in shambling mutant mice". Journal of Neurochemistry. 27 (1): 295–296. doi:10.1111/j.1471-4159.1976.tb01580.x. PMID 956836. S2CID 7023434.

Seyfried, T. N.; Weber, E. J.; Yu, R. K. (1977). "Influence of trichloracetic acid-phosphotungstic acid on the thin layer chromatographic mobility of gangliosides". Lipids. 12 (11): 979–980. doi:10.1007/BF02533321. PMID 927050. S2CID 3996037.

Weber, E. J. (1979). "The lipids of corn germ and endosperm". Journal of the American Oil Chemists' Society. 56 (6): 637–641. doi:10.1007/BF02679340. S2CID 85047561.

Weber, E. J. (1980). "Corn Kernel Modification". In Swain, T.; Kleiman, R. (eds.). The Resource Potential in Phytochemistry. Springer US. pp. 97–137. doi:10.1007/978-1-4684-8309-3_5. ISBN 978-1-4684-8309-3.

Weber, E. J. (1981). "Compositions of commercial corn and soybean lecithins". Journal of the American Oil Chemists' Society. 58 (10): 898–901. doi:10.1007/BF02659654. S2CID 85079031.

Gronewald, J. W.; Abou-Khalil, W.; Weber, E. J.; Hanson, J. B. (1982). "Lipid composition of a plasma membrane enriched fraction of maize roots". Phytochemistry. 21 (4): 859–862. Bibcode:1982PChem..21..859G. doi:10.1016/0031-9422(82)80080-0.

Weber, E. J. (1983). "Variation in corn (Zea mays L.) for fatty acid compositions of triglycerides and phospholipids". Biochemical Genetics. 21 (1–2): 1–13. doi:10.1007/BF02395387. PMID 6838482. S2CID 264224078.

Weber, E. J. (1984). "High performance liquid chromatography of the tocols in corn grain". Journal of the American Oil Chemists' Society. 61 (7): 1231–1234. doi:10.1007/BF02636259. S2CID 96772173.

Weber, E. J. (1987). "Carotenoids and tocols of corn grain determined by HPLC". Journal of the American Oil Chemists' Society. 64 (8): 1129–1134. doi:10.1007/BF02612988. S2CID 96228500.
