= John Brown's Raid (TV play) =

1960 American television special

- Genre: TV play
- Written by: Robert Crean
- Directed by: Sidney Lumet
- Starring: James Mason
- Country of origin: United States
- Original language: English

Production
- Producer: Robert Alan Aurthur
- Production location: Harpers Ferry, West Virginia
- Camera setup: Mobile Tape Unit
- Running time: 60 mins

Original release
- Network: NBC
- Release: October 25, 1960

John Brown's Raid is a 1960 NBC television play directed by Sidney Lumet.

== Plot ==
The story of John Brown's raid on Harpers Ferry.

== Cast ==
- James Mason as John Brown
- Wesley Addy as Colonel Lewis Washington
- Roberts Blossom as Stevens
- James Broderick as Watson Brown
- Thomas Carlin as Leeman
- Ossie Davis as Dangerfield Newby
- Robert Duvall as Oliver Brown
- Timothy Everett as Dauphin Thompson
- Robert Gerringer as Wilf Thompson
- James Greene as Coppoc
- Earle Hyman as Emperor Green
- Virgina Kaye as Inn Mistress
- Mark Lennard as armory fuard

== Production ==
It was shot on location at Harper's Ferry. Producer Robert Alan Aurthur said the decision was based on NBC's success the prior season with recording The American on location in Arizona, and the fact that Harper's Ferry had been restored to its original condition, making it a "superb location" and "an extraordinarily beautiful site." The Los Angeles Times said it was rehearsed in one day and filmed in four days. James Mason wrote in his memoirs that there were ten days of rehearsal in New York. It was shot on video tape.

== Reception ==
Mason said when he saw the production "a lot of good material was missing and the dramatic urgency was never really established."

Variety later wrote:

[Lumet] tried to maneuver things into some semblance of that needed reality, but it was a lost cause from the start. Little enough drama emerged from the hour outing and one couldn't help wondering: why this continuing concentration on John Brown as a subject of presentation when the end result proved little more than the rantings of a religious fanatic”; for it was as though everybody concerned was briefed on the premise: ‘Forget about the drama, ir’s the tape job that counts.' At least that’s the way it played.

== Notes ==
- Mason, James (1989). Before I forget : autobiography and drawings. Sphere.
