= Christian Blackwood =

American film director and cinematographer

- Born: July 7, 1942; Berlin, Germany
- Died: July 22, 1992 (aged 50); New York City, New York, U.S.
- Occupations: Cinematographer, Director
- Spouse(s): Carolyn Marks Blackwood (married 1992)

Christian Blackwood (July 7, 1942 – July 22, 1992) was an American film director and cinematographer.

He was initially a child actor, then a cinematographer acclaimed for his work in Charlotte Zwerin's Thelonious Monk: Straight, No Chaser. But his major work was as the director or producer of over 95 films, mostly documentaries, over a 30-year career. His most famous films are Observations Under The Volcano and On the Set of Death of a Salesman, behind-the-scenes looks at the creation of movies by John Huston and Volker Schlöndorff from the famous novel and play. The latter film won him the grand prize at the Sundance Film Festival.

Christian Blackwood died in 1992 of lung cancer. He was married to film writer, producer and fine art photographer, Carolyn Marks Blackwood. His brother, Michael Blackwood, was an independent documentary filmmaker, who produced and directed more than 150 films during the course of his career.

== Partial filmography as actor ==
- Murderers Among Us (1946) - Otto Brueckner (uncredited).

== Partial filmography as director ==
- Summer in the City (1969) - street interviews of various characters on the Upper West Side in New York City.
- Juilliard (1971) - A visit in 1971 to the classrooms of the Juilliard School, the prominent music academy.
- Hollywood’s Musical Moods (1972) - a documentary about the composers who created the musical backgrounds for the movies of Hollywood’s “golden age”.
- Yesterday’s Witness: A Tribute to the American Newsreel (1974) - history of American newsreel.
- Roger Corman: Hollywood’s Wild Angel (1978) - a look at the career of film director Roger Corman.
- Tapdancin’ (1980) - overview of art of tap dance.
- Memoirs of a Movie Palace: The Kings of Flatbush (1980) - a reminiscence about the days of Kings Theatre before it was closed in 1977.
- Sam Fuller: Writings with a Camera (1981) - a visit with film director Sam Fuller on the set of his film White Dog.
- Edith Head (1981) - A light-hearted portrait of a Hollywood costume designer Edith Head.
- All by Myself: The Eartha Kitt Story (1982) - a personal account of the life and career of Eartha Kitt, an American singer, songwriter, and actress.
- Aznavour: Breaking America (1984) - documents French singer Charles Aznavour as he moves his family from France to Los Angeles.
- Nik and Murray: The Dances of Alwin Nikolais and Murray Louis (1986) - A portrait of choreographers Alwin Nikolais and Murray Louis.
- Signed: Lino Brocka (1987) - a documentary on Philippine film director Lino Brocka.
- Motel (1989) - stories of three motels untouched by corporatism and their owners.
