= Wayne Dodd =

American poet

Wayne D. Dodd is an American poet and teacher of poetry from Oklahoma. Dodd was born on September 23, 1930, in Clarita, Oklahoma to Homer Dewey and Maggie Matilda Dodd. He died on March 21, 2026, in Athens, Ohio. As both poet and teacher of poetry (he is a distinguished professor at Ohio University), he has worked, read his poems, and lectured at many colleges, universities, and art centers. He was educated at the University of Oklahoma, receiving his B.A., M.A., and Ph.D. there.

== Career ==
- Assistant professor University Colorado, Boulder from 1960 to 1968
- Assistant editor Abstracts of English Studies, 1961-1968
- Professor English Ohio University, Athens, 1968–1994
- Distinguished Professor, since 1994.
- Editor The Ohio Review, 1971–2001. Member advisory board Coordinating Council Literature Magazines, New York City, 1975-1977

== Publications ==
Dodd has published eleven books, including a novel entitled A Time of Hunting (1975), Toward the End of the Century: Essays Into Poetry (1992), and The Blue Salvages for which he was nominated for a National Book Award in 1998. He was nominated for a Pulitzer in 1994 for his poetry book, Of Desire and Disorder. His other poetry books include We Will Wear White Roses, Made in America, and Sometimes Music Rises.

== Critical acclaim ==
Mr. Dodd's work has been honored by nominations for the Pulitzer Prize and the National Book Critics Circle Award for Poetry and has been a finalist for the American Academy of Poets' Lenore Marshall Poetry Prize. Among the literary awards and recognitions he has received are grants from the National Endowment for the Arts and the Ohio Arts Council, and fellowships from the Rockefeller Foundation and the United States Park Service. He is the recipient of the Krout Memorial Award for Lifetime Achievement from the Ohioana Library Association, the Patterson Award in Poetry and the 2001 Governor's Award for the Arts/Individual Artist Award.
