= Josh Hyde =

American film director

Josh Hyde is an American writer, director and independent filmmaker. His films, including the award-winning short Chicle, have been shown at the Berlin International Film Festival and Tribeca Film Festival. Hyde's films are often character-driven narratives on the themes of cultural identity and global politics.

== Early life and education ==
Hyde was born to an American father and Filipino immigrant mother in St. Louis, Missouri. The second of three children, Hyde was raised in Carbondale, Illinois, and did well at foreign language and the arts in school.

After graduating from Southern Illinois University in 2003 with a Bachelor of Arts degree in Cinema and Photography, Hyde left the U.S. for Cusco, Peru, where he directed Despacho, a documentary on the cultural exchange between western medicine and indigenous Peruvian shamanistic techniques. Upon his return, Hyde moved to Chicago, Illinois where he interned with Kartemquin Films and was introduced to producer Steve James There he worked as a translator on The New Americans, and began writing the screenplay for Chicle Y Postales.

In 2003 Hyde entered the Master of Fine Arts program at Ohio University, working under Croatian director/producer Rajko Grlić.

== Career ==
In the summer of 2004 Hyde returned to Cusco to shoot the short film version of his feature-length script for Chicle. To date the short film has played in the Tribeca Film Festival, Hamptons International Film Festival, Berlin International Film Festival, Mill Valley Film Festival, Vladivostok Film Festival, Brisbane Film Festival, Black Maria Film Festival, Chicago International Film Festival, Zimbabwe International Film Festival, and Athens International Film Festival. This film landed in the Korean National Film Archive, where it is viewed as an example of excellence in film textbooks and curriculum.

After receiving his MFA, Hyde moved to New York City, where he continues to make films. Hyde currently resides in the New York borough of Brooklyn.

Hyde's unreleased film Last Man Standing is a documentary on the life of up and coming alt-folk musician Drew Landry.

In the fall of 2008, Hyde planned to return once again to Cusco, for the filming of his feature-length script Chicle Y Postales, and its subsequent release in spring 2008.

== Awards and honors ==
- Chicle
- Tribeca International
- Berlin International
- Hamptons International (Best Student Short)
- Chicago International (Best Short, Gold Hugo)
- Black Maria Film Festival (Director’s Choice Award)
- Vladviostock International
- Urban International
- Zimbabwe International
- Athens International

== Filmography ==
- Despacho (2004)
- Chicle (2005)
- Last Man Standing (2008)
- Chicle Y Postales (2008)
