= Patrick J. Fox =

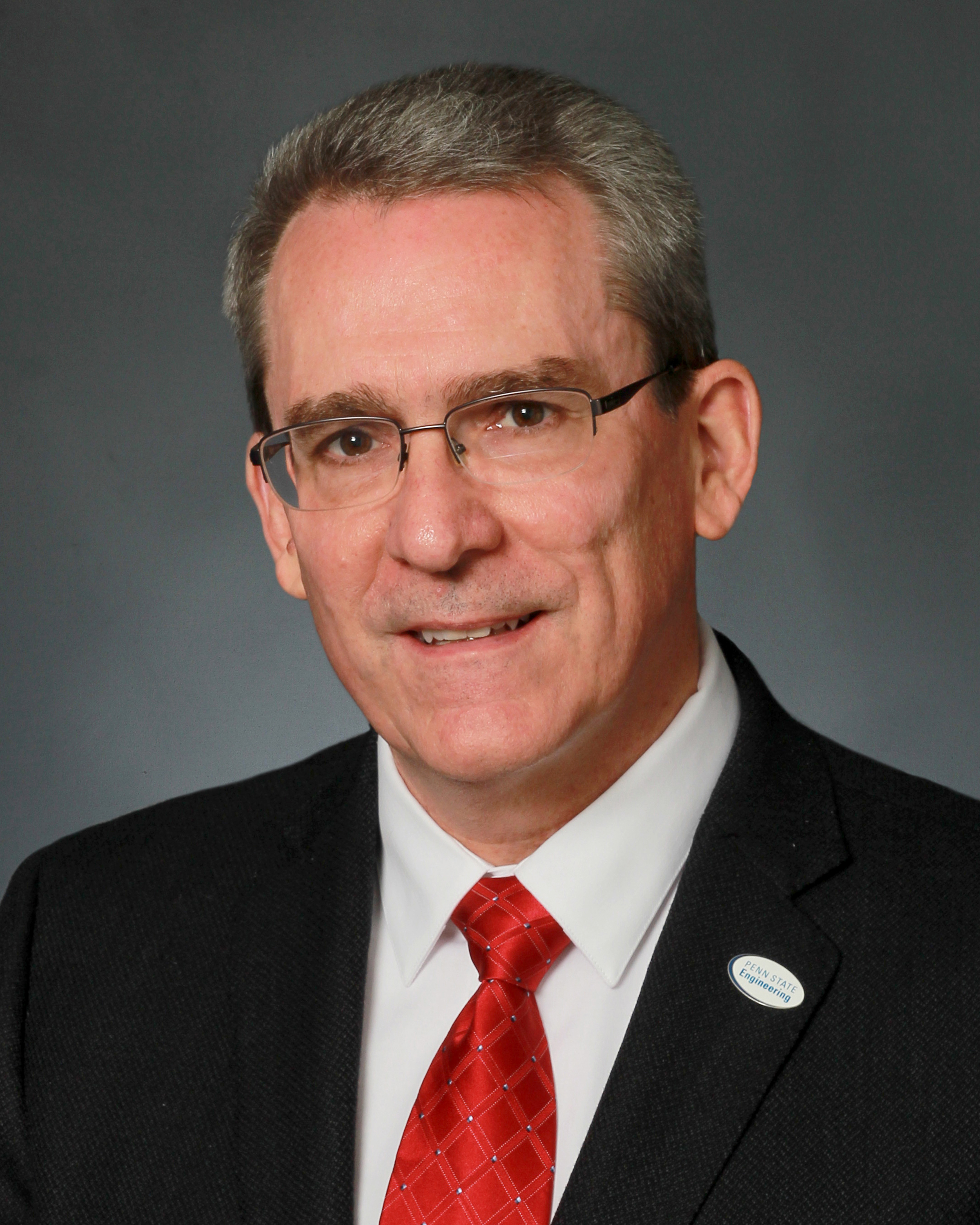
Patrick Fox in 2015

Patrick J Fox, Ph.D., P.E., BC.GE, F.ASCE (born 1962) is an American civil engineer and currently Professor of Civil Engineering at Ohio University. His field of expertise is geotechnical and geoenvironmental engineering, with specializations in slope stability, retaining walls, landfills, and settlement.

He graduated from the University of Cincinnati summa cum laude (1985). He obtained an M.S. (1987) and a Ph.D. (1992) in civil and environmental engineering from the University of Wisconsin–Madison.

Prior to his tenure at Ohio University, he taught at UC San Diego Jacobs School of Engineering, Purdue University, Ohio State University, and the University of California, Los Angeles.

Fox served on the Board of Governors for the Geo-Institute of the American Society of Civil Engineers (ASCE) from 2014 to 2021 and as president of the Geo-Institute in 2020. He served as Editor and then Editor-in-Chief of the ASCE Journal of Geotechnical and Geoenvironmental Engineering from 2007 to 2015, and is a past chair of the Technical Publications Committee of the ASCE Geo-Institute. He also has served on the editorial boards for Geotextiles and Geomembranes, Geosynthetics International, and the International Journal of Geomechanics. Starting in 2021, he has been Editor for Geosynthetics International.

He has received awards for teaching, research, and service. His research awards include the Arthur Casagrande Professional Development Award from ASCE, Thomas A. Middlebrooks Award (three times) from ASCE, IGS Award (twice) from the International Geosynthetics Society, Chandrakant S. Desai Medal and John Booker Medal from the International Association for Computer Methods and Advances in Geomechanics (IACMAG), and best paper awards from the Geotechnical Testing Journal, Geosynthetics International (twice), and the International Journal of Geomechanics (three times).

Fox is a licensed professional engineer, Board Certified Geotechnical Engineer from the Academy of Geo-Professionals (AGP), and Fellow of ASCE.
