= Delta Theta Sigma =

American professional agricultural fraternity

- ΔΘΣ
- Founded: 1906; 120 years ago Ohio State University
- Type: Professional
- Affiliation: Independent
- Status: Active
- Emphasis: Agriculture
- Scope: National
- Motto: "Knowledge and Brotherhood in a Bond of Union"
- Colors: Blue and Gold
- Flower: White carnation
- Publication: The Shield
- Chapters: 7
- Headquarters: 301 Jefferson Avenue, SW; Fertile, Minnesota 56540; United States
- Website: dtsfraternity.org

Delta Theta Sigma (ΔΘΣ) is a social professional agricultural fraternity. It was created in 1906 at Ohio State University. There are currently seven active chapters of Delta Theta Sigma.

== History ==
In the spring of 1906, several men gathered together in a rooming house at 175 West 9th Avenue in Columbus, Ohio. The idea, conceived primarily by three men, Maxwell Corotius, Samuel N. Kerr, and Stanley B. Stowe, was the beginning of Delta Theta Sigma Fraternity at Ohio State University.

The name, Delta Theta Sigma, and the fourfold purposes of the fraternity were drafted with the advice of Professor Smith of the Greek Language Department at Ohio State University. As stated in its constitution, the purpose of Delta Theta Sigma is "to promote agriculture, to secure a higher degree of scholarship, to foster the spirit of brotherhood in our vocation, and to ensure social and cultural unity, to promote our organization to the fulfillment of these ideals." The fraternity was incorporated under the laws of the State of Ohio on April 5, 1907 with 17 charter members.

The Delta Theta Sigma idea was contagious, not only at Ohio State University but also on many other agricultural college campuses throughout the Midwest. Within a few years, chapters had been organized on ten other campuses. At a national convention in 1912, all of the chapters except the original chapter at Ohio State University voted to make Delta Theta Sigma an agricultural honorary fraternity. The local chapter at Ohio State University retained the original name, Delta Theta Sigma. The other ten chapters, therefore, assumed the name, Gamma Sigma Delta.

On November 26, 1927, representatives from Delta Theta Sigma at Ohio State University, Alpha Gamma Phi, a local at Pennsylvania State University, and a former FarmHouse chapter at the University of Wisconsin–Madison met in Pittsburgh, Pennsylvania, in Room 211 of the William Penn Hotel. This meeting resulted in the formation of a new national agriculture fraternity, Delta Theta Sigma.

Within two years, from 1957 to 1958, all three chapters moved into new houses. The Gamma chapter at Wisconsin expanded from one house into two houses located at 320 North Lathrop Street. The Beta chapter at Pennsylvania was the victim of a costly fire during the winter of 1958. They were fortunate, however, and found an excellent house at 101 North Patterson Street, into which they moved during the spring of 1958. The Alpha chapter at Ohio State outgrew the old house and moved into a new chapter home located at 80 East 13th Avenue in March 1958.

This same year, 1958, found the fraternity growing nationally, also. A fourth chapter, Delta, at the University of Minnesota, was organized and approved for membership in Delta Theta Sigma in May 1958. During the 1960-61 school year, the Delta chapter rented its first and present chapter home located at 1485 North Cleveland Avenue in Saint Paul, Minnesota. Then, in the fall of 1966, growth required them to rent the downstairs of the house next door at 1495 North Cleveland Avenue, in Saint Paul.

In 1969, a fifth chapter, Epsilon, was chartered at the University of Wisconsin–River Falls. Albert Beaver, a Gamma chapter alumnus, was instrumental in organizing Epsilon, and in 1970, helped them to purchase the house in which they are presently located.

The fraternity's sixth chapter, Zeta, was organized and chartered at Purdue University in West Lafayette, Indiana, in the spring of 1982. With the help of four alumni, Neils Neilson, Gamma; George Van Soyoc and Jim Vorst, Alpha; and Herb Olm, Delta, the thirteen charter members and one new member were activated by National Delta Theta Sigma officers in May 1982. Zeta was able to rent a house their first year and is presently located at 321 Vine Street.

In January 1983, agricultural students at Wilmington College of Ohio had a desire to belong to a national fraternity. Through the leadership of senior J. Timothy McCarty, 36 students were recruited and expressed a desire to become the founding fathers of the Eta chapter. With the direction of national officer Rick Harr, the Eta chapter was organized and chartered in the spring of 1983. With the help of the national executive council, the purchase of a large house near campus was made, located at 780 Rombach Avenue in Wilmington, Ohio, and was occupied in January 1984.

In 1997, Delta Theta Sigma colonized the University of Minnesota Crookston chapter with help from the Delta chapter. The Theta chapter was officially recognized at the 1998 conclave hosted by the Delta chapter. At its beginning, Theta chapter rented a house located at 101 North Nelson in Crookston, Minnesota and is now in a house at 204 Gorgas Avenue in Crookston.

== Symbols ==
Delta Theta Sigma's motto is "Knowledge and Brotherhood in a Bond of Union". Its colors are blue and gold. Its flower is the white carnation. The fraternity's publication is The Shield.

== Chapters ==
Following are the chapters of Delta Theta Sigma, with active chapters indicated in bold and inactive chapters in italics.

Chapter	Charter date and range	Institution	Location	Status	Ref.
**Alpha**	1906	Ohio State University	Columbus, Ohio	Active	
Unnamed ISU chapter	1907–1912	Iowa State University	Ames, Iowa	Inactive	
Unnamed U of MO chapter	1908–1912	University of Missouri	Columbia, Missouri	Inactive	
**Beta**	1908–1912; 1927	Pennsylvania State University	State College, Pennsylvania	Active	(Note: This chapter's revival came in 1927 with the absorption of Alpha Gamma Phi (local), originally established in 1922.)
Unnamed Oregon State chapter	1908–1912	Oregon Agricultural College	Corvallis, Oregon	Inactive	
Unnamed Utah State chapter	1908–1912	Utah State University	Logan, Utah	Inactive	
Gamma	1927–2024	University of Wisconsin–Madison	Madison, Wisconsin	Inactive	(Note: This chapter had originally formed as a chapter of FarmHouse fraternity in 1921.)
**Delta**	1958	University of Minnesota	Saint Paul, Minnesota	Active	
**Epsilon**	1969	University of Wisconsin–River Falls	River Falls, Wisconsin	Active	
Zeta	1982–2011	Purdue University	West Lafayette, Indiana	Inactive	
**Eta**	1983	Wilmington College	Wilmington, Ohio	Active	
Theta	1998-????	University of Minnesota Crookston	Crookston, Minnesota	Inactive	

== Notable members ==
- Conrad Elvehjem (Gamma), president of the University of Wisconsin discoverer of niacin
- Harry Steel (Alpha), winner of a gold medal in Freestyle Wrestling in the 1924 Summer Olympics
- Russell Redding (Beta), Pennsylvania Secretary of Agriculture

== See also ==
- List of social fraternities and sororities
- Professional fraternities and sororities
