= Martha Hill =

American dance instructor (1900–1995)

- Born: December 1, 1900; East Palestine, Ohio, U.S.
- Died: November 19, 1995 (aged 94); Brooklyn, New York, U.S.
- Occupation: Dance instructor
- Spouse: Thurston Davies

Martha Hill (December 1, 1900 – November 19, 1995) was an American dance instructor with wide influence. She founded innovative programs at Bennington College and Connecticut College, and was the first Director of Dance at the Juilliard School, a position she held for almost 35 years.

After her death, the New York Times called her "of incalculable importance in the develolpment of modern dance in America."

== Early life ==
Hill was born in East Palestine, Ohio. She attended the Battle Creek Normal School of Physical Education in Battle Creek, Michigan, graduating in 1920. She took over the position of dance instructor, teaching ballet and Swedish gymnastics for the next three years. In 1923, she was hired as dance instructor at Kansas State Teachers College. Hill taught there for three years, then moved to[New York City in 1926.

== Career ==
After arriving in New York, she studied with various dance teachers; one of note was Martha Graham who would have a lasting impact on Hill. She was hired in 1927 as Assistant Professor of Dance at the University of Oregon where Bessie Schonberg was one of Hill's students.

By 1929, Hill had saved up enough money to move back to New York. She joined the Martha Graham Dance Company, completed a BS degree from Teachers College, Columbia University, and began teaching high school students at the Lincoln School of Teachers College. She was hired to teach at New York University in the Physical Education Department of the School of Education in 1930, soon becoming Director of Dance. Hill reluctantly left the Martha Graham Dance Company in 1931 because of an increasing teaching schedule. In 1932, Hill was hired by newly founded Bennington College in Bennington, VT, as Chairman of the Dance Department. She held the positions at NYU and Bennington College simultaneously until 1951.

In the summer of 1934, Hill initiated a summer dance festival on the Bennington College campus, named the "Bennington School of the Dance", which ran until 1942, with a brief interlude at Mills College in 1939. Doris Humphrey, Martha Graham, Charles Weidman, and Hanya Holm were key faculty members.

Hill received her master's degree from New York University in 1941. In 1948 she formed a School of the Dance at Connecticut College calling it the "Connecticut College School of the Dance". The new summer festival employed many of the same teachers/choreographers from the Bennington festival. Hill was a co-director of the festival until 1952. The festival was later renamed the American Dance Festival and is currently housed at Duke University in North Carolina.

In 1951, William Schuman, president of The Juilliard School, hired Hill to be the first Director of Dance. Schuman and Hill had the bold new concept of creating a training ground for dancers that would be equally split between ballet and modern dance.

Hill married Dr. Thurston Davies in 1952. Davies died in 1961.

Hill remained the director of dance at Juilliard until 1985, training generations of dancers to the highest level of technique and artistry. She continued to teach at Juilliard for several more years after stepping down as director. Her students included Paul Taylor, Paula Kelly, Muriel Topaz, Pina Bausch, Daniel Lewis, Lar Lubovitch, Ani Udovicki, Yasuko Tokunaga, Dennis Nahat, Linda Kent, Dudley Williams, Bruce Marks, Mercedes Ellington, H.T. Chen, Martha Clarke, Susan Marshall, Sylvia Waters, Lance Westergard, H. T. Chen, Jenny Coogan, Robert Garland, Mark Haim, Bebe Neuwirth, Paul Dennis, Liz Gerring, Henning Rübsam, Vernon Scott, Janet Eilber, Megan Williams, Elizabeth McPherson, Rebecca Stenn, Rebecca Lazier, and Stanley Love.

== Legacy ==
A documentary about her, Miss Hill: Making Dance Matter, directed by Greg Vander Veer and produced by the Martha Hill Dance Fund, premiered at the Dance on Camera Festival in New York City in 2014.
