= Broadway Express =

Broadway Express may refer to the following subway services in New York City:

- N (Broadway Express-Sea Beach Local)
- Q (Broadway Express-Brighton Local)

It may also refer to Broadway Express (album).
