= Gundu Hirisave Rama Rao =

Indian scientist and entrepreneur

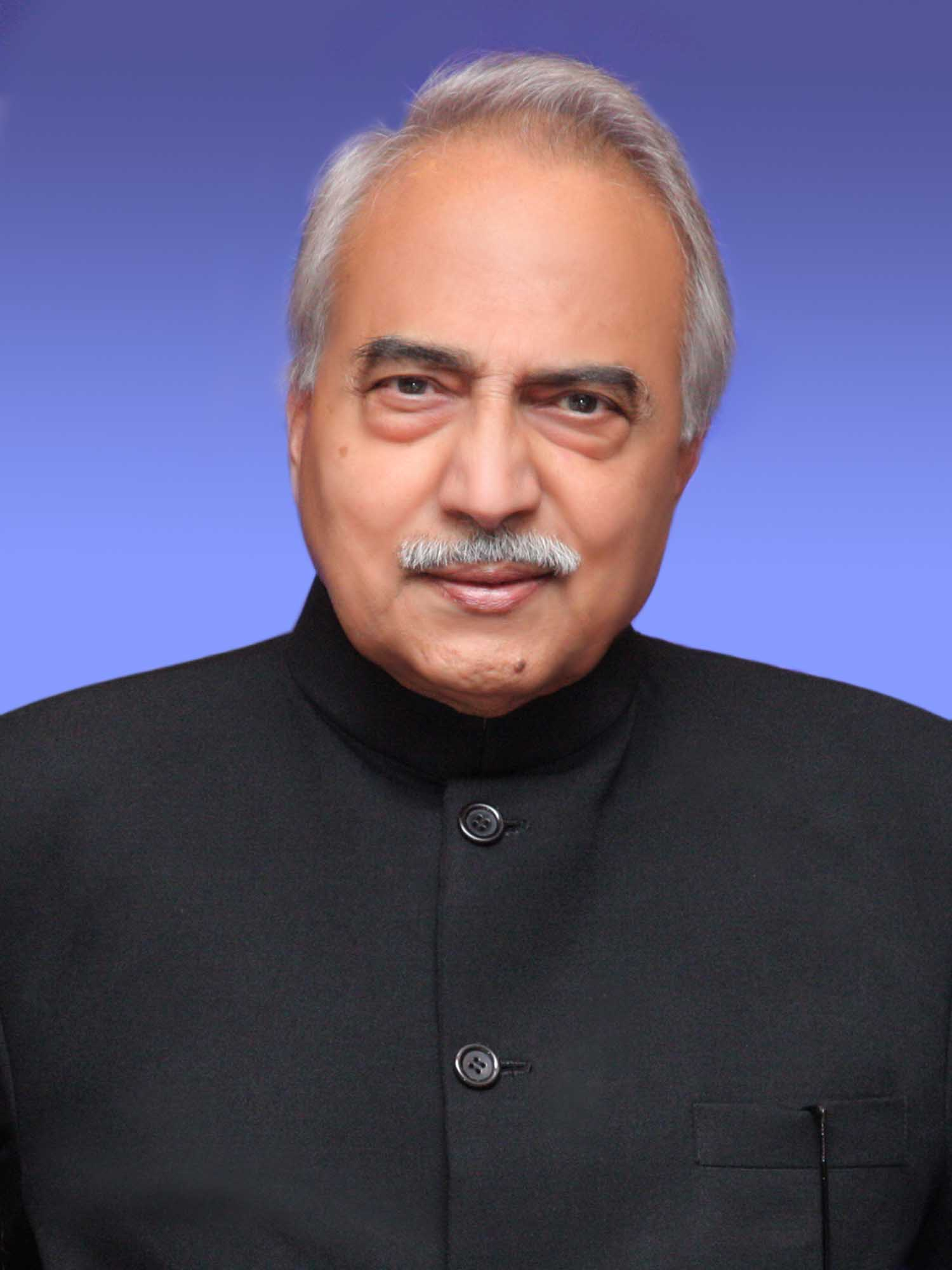
Rao in 2010

Gundu Hirisave Rama Rao is an Indian scientist, entrepreneur and emeritus professor at the University of Minnesota's Academic Health Center. He and fellow professor John Eaton visited India in 1981 National Science Foundation sponsorship to explore opportunities for collaborative research projects, visiting medical institutions from Kashmir in the north to Trivandrum in the south. Rao again visited India from 1990 to 1993 as a professor and senior consultant for the government of India under the TOKTEN (Transfer of Knowledge Through Expatriate Nationals) United Nations Development Program (UNDP), sponsored by the Council of Scientific and Industrial Research. He is a member of the Minneapolis University Rotary Club.

Rao is the founder of the South Asian Society on Atherosclerosis and Thrombosis and AayuSmart LLC, an IT-supported web-based health-management company. He has been involved in creating awareness and developing educational and preventive programs to prevent non-communicable diseases such as hypertension, obesity, metabolic diseases, type 2 diabetes, vascular diseases, and stroke. Rao, who lived in Minnesota for nearly 40 years, lives in Maryland with his wife, two children, and three grandchildren. He spends half of his time in India, developing collaborative projects related to improving health care.

== Early life and education ==
Rao was born in Tumkur, Karnataka, India, on August 23, 1937. His father's ancestors were from Hirisave in Hassan district; his mother's ancestors were from Thimmasandra, a small village 20 miles from Tumkur. Rao's primary education was in a Hindu gurukula; his middle-school education was at Government Western Middle School and Old Middle School, and he graduated from Government High School in 1953. He studied at the Government First Grade College and obtained a BSc degree in chemistry, botany, and zoology in 1957. Rao received a BSc (Hons) degree in zoology in 1958 and a MSc degree in entomology in 1959 from Pune University.

== Early career in India ==
Rao worked at the Commonwealth Institute of Biological Control in Bangalore for almost two years. During this time, he spent eight months in Dalhousie, Himachal Pradesh, collecting and breeding ladybird beetles for export to the US when the Dalai Lama arrived in India via Dalhousie. Rao spent several months in the hill station of Coonoor working on tea pests. After resigning from the institute, Rao worked in the Central Food Technological Research Institute in Mysore from 1960 to 1965 on pest control in food products. During this period, he received junior and senior research fellowships from the Council of Scientific and Industrial Research before leaving for the US to obtain a PhD.

== Early career in the US ==
Rao studied for a PhD in agriculture entomology at Kansas State University, specializing in grain science technology. He did a year of post-doctoral work in Texas A&M University's Department of Entomology in 1969. The following year, Rao joined the University of Minnesota's faculty in the Department of Entomology, Fisheries and Wildlife.

He began working with James G. White, who was researching the morphology and ultrastructure of blood platelets in the Department of Pediatrics, in 1972. He collaborated with White on platelet physiology and pharmacology, publishing over 200 articles on the subject in peer-reviewed journals. Rao shared NIH research grants for over three decades as a co-investigator.

Rao spent the summer of 1988 at King's College London in the Department of Surgery with Vijay Kakkar. The following summer, he visited the Royal College of Surgeons' Department of Biochemistry and worked with Neville Crawford. In the summer of 1989, Rao visited the Thrombosis Research Institute in London and worked again with Kakkar's group. He taught at the University of Padua's Institute of Human Physiology during the summer of 1992.

== University of Minnesota ==
Rao visited India in 1981 with John W. Eaton, professor of molecular anthropology at the University of Minnesota, to explore opportunities to establish collaborative programs. During this visit, he visited medical institutions in Mumbai (hematology and genetics), Delhi (AIIMS' Malaria Research Institute), Chandigarh (PGI), Srinagar (Medical College for high-altitude physiology), Hyderabad (genetics), Chennai (PGI, Taramani), Vellore (Christian Medical College) and Bangalore (Indian Institute of Science).

As an international adviser to the University of Minnesota Office of International Programs, Rao suggested a number of medical institutions in India and Nepal for student and faculty exchange programs and recommended several colleagues for an honorary professorship in international health at the university. He spends four months per year in Bangalore developing collaborative programs to improve drug and medical-device development and IT-supported health care.

== Current activities ==
Rao is a scientific adviser for the South Asian Society on Atherosclerosis and Thrombosis, the North American Thrombosis Forum and the International Union of Angiology. He is working on regulatory issues related to outsourcing generic drugs and issues related to the characterization and development of biopharmaceuticals and biosimilars. He is also working on establishing a platform in India to develop biomarker assays for the early detection of cancer and cardiovascular diseases and handheld medical devices for monitoring the assays. Another area of interest is the development of cost-effective self-diagnostic medical devices.

== Awards and fellowships ==
- Fellow, Royal Entomological Society, London.
- Fellow, International Academy of Clinical and Applied Thrombosis and Hemostasis, US.
- Fellow, Indian College of Cardiology.
- Distinguished Career Award, International Union of Angiology, France.
- Distinguished Career Award, World Clinical Cardiology Conference, 2009.
- Lifetime Achievement Award, 2nd International Conference on Contemporary Biologists, India.
- Paul Harris Fellow, US.

== Professional affiliations ==
- Life member, Society for Biomaterials and Artificial Organs (India)
- Rotary Club: Paul Harris Fellow
- Life Fellow, Commonwealth Association For Mental Handicap Developmental Disabilities (UK)
- Founder and CEO, South Asian Society on Atherosclerosis and Thrombosis (SASAT)
- Life member, Academy of Environmental Biology (India)
- Life member, Friends of Christian Medical College Vellore (India)
- Life member, Chronobiological Society of India
- Fellow, National Academy of Clinical Biochemists (US)
- Member, Sigma Xi and Gamma Sigma Delta (US)
- Founder, Academy of Pest Control Sciences (India)
- Life member, Food and Grain Technologists Research Association (India)
- Life member, Entomological Society of India
- Fellow, Royal Entomological Society (UK)
- Founder director, Karnataka Hybrid Micro Devices, Bangalore, India
- Honorary Professor, Sri Chitra Tiruanl Institute For Medical Sciences and Technology, Trivandrum
- Chief technology officer, Stellixir Biotech, Bangalore

== Bibliography (as editor) ==
- Handbook of Platelet Physiology and Pharmacology, Kluwer Academic Publishers, Boston, 1999. ISBN 0-7923-8538-1
- Coronary Artery Disease in South Asians: Epidemiology, Risk Factors, Prevention. Jaypee Medical Publishers, New Delhi, 2001. ISBN 81-7179-811-X
- Coronary Artery Disease: Risk Factors, Pathophysiology and Prevention. Jaypee Medical Publishers, New Delhi, 2005. ISBN 81-8061-450-6
- Handbook of Blood Banking and Transfusion Medicine. Jaypee Medical Publishers, New Delhi, 2006. ISBN 81-8061-718-1
- Diabetes Mellitus (Type-2): Epidemiology, Risk Management, and Prevention. Jaypee Medical Publishers, New Delhi, 2007. ISBN 81-8061-936-2
- Clinical Handbook of Management of Antithrombotic and Thrombolytic Therapy. Kontentworx, New Delhi, 2014. ISBN 978-9383988-01-3
