= Sarah Wyatt =

American molecular biologist

Sarah E. Wyatt
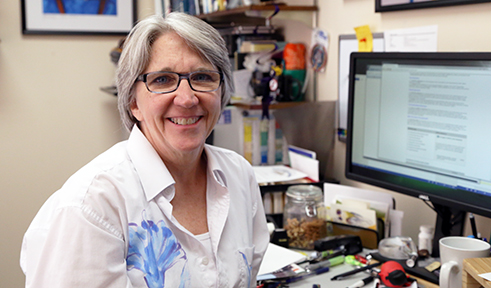
- Known for: Plant gravitropic signaling
- Scientific career
- Fields: Plant molecular biology
- Institutions: Ohio University

Sarah Wyatt is an American, plant molecular biologist. She is a professor in the Department of Environmental and Plant Biology at Ohio University, as well as director of the Ohio University Interdisciplinary Graduate Program in Molecular and Cellular Biology. Wyatt's research interests include molecular biology, genomics, and signaling events. She is considered one of the world's experts on gravitational signaling in plants, and some of her recent research includes an experiment on board the International Space Station (ISS).

== Education and career ==
Sarah Wyatt was born in 1958 and raised in Mayfield, Kentucky. She received her B.S. in Cognition and Development in 1980 and a B.S. in biology in 1984 from the University of Kentucky. In 1991, she received her M.S. in Plant Pathology, also from the University of Kentucky. She went on to attend Purdue University and in 1995 received her Ph.D. from the Interdisciplinary Plant Physiology Program.

From 1982 to 1988, Wyatt held a position as a Senior Scientist in Research and Development for Fungal and Parasitic Diseases American Scientific Products in Lexington, Kentucky, after which she was a research assistant in the Department of Plant Pathology at Kentucky University from 1988 to 1990. In 1994, Wyatt was a visiting scientist at both the University of Zurich in Zurich, Switzerland, and the Russian Academy of Sciences in Kazan, Russia.

In 2012, while holding a position as Associate Chair in the Department of Environmental and Plant Biology at Ohio University, Wyatt served as "Rotating" Program Director of Integrative and Organismal Systems for the National Science Foundation. She continued her service to the National Science Foundation as an Intermittent Program Director for Molecular and Cell Biology from 2014 to 2015. Currently, Wyatt is a professor in the Department of Environmental and Plant Biology and Director of the Interdisciplinary Molecular and Cell Biology Program at Ohio University, Athens, Ohio. Her research lab is staffed by both graduate and undergraduate students, who use molecular, genetic and genomic tools to study plant growth and development, with a focus on plant gravitropic signaling. Other projects in the Wyatt lab involve the shift between chasmogamous (open) and cleistogamous (closed) flowers in Viola pubescens and genetic fingerprints indicating gene expression and relationships during evolution of plant species.

== NASA experience and ISS experiment ==
Following her Ph.D., Wyatt became a Research Associate for the NASA Specialized Center of Research and Training in the Department of Botany at North Carolina State University. She held that position from 1996 to 2000, after which she began her teaching career at Ohio University in the Department of Environmental and Plant Biology. In early 2013, Wyatt submitted a research proposal to NASA's Research Opportunities in Space Biology (ROSBio), and in May of the same year her proposal along with eight others, was accepted for experimentation aboard the ISS. The objective of her space flight mission, entitled The Biological Research in Canisters-20 (BRIC-20), was to germinate Arabidopsis thaliana seedlings in space and study their transcriptomic and proteomic responses to microgravity. In January 2015, the SpaceX Falcon 9 was sent into orbit, placing a Dragon cargo capsule with the BRIC-20 experiment in path to the ISS Harmony module. The SpaceX Dragon cargo was released from the ISS after a month of spaceflight and returned to Earth for de-integration at the Kennedy Space Center. Once de-integrated, samples were shipped to the Wyatt lab at Ohio University for proteomic and transcriptomic analyses. Results of the space flight mission are in press and under review (see selected publications) and may provide invaluable insight into how plants cope in a microgravity environment, subsequently enhancing efforts to use plants for sources of food and oxygen during future spaceflight missions. Following the BRIC-20 mission, Wyatt received Faculty Fellowship Leave to work with GeneLab - Omics Open Science Initiative at the NASA Ames Research Center in Mountain View, California.

== Service and outreach ==
Through her academic career, Wyatt has presented numerous talks, demonstrations, and workshops reaching approximately 2,100 sixth-twelfth grade students, 1,000 elementary aged students, and 80 adults. Wyatt has been the Organizing Committee Chair and a presenter for AAUW's Tech Savvy program in Athens, Ohio since 2014. Tech Savvy is a daylong STEM career conference for middle school girls, aimed at introducing and attracting them to the STEM fields through hands-on activities. Wyatt has been a voluntary member of the Plant Science Definition Team through NASA since August 2016, and has sat on numerous grant panels including those through NASA, the National Science Foundation (NSF), the United States Department of Agriculture, European Space Agency, and the American Society of Plant Biologists (ASPB). She has served as a manuscript reviewer and on the editorial boards for over 15 scientific journals such as the American Journal of Botany, Plant Cell, and Plant Physiology. Wyatt is currently the Education Committee Chair for ASPB and holds this position through 2019.

== Awards and recognition ==
- Faculty Fellowship Leave, GeneLab - Omics Open Science Initiative NASA Ames Research Center, Mountain View, CA
- Excellence in Education Award, American Society of Plant Biologist, 2017
- Presidential Research Scholar, Ohio University, 2016
- Presidential Teaching Award, Ohio University, 2014-2017
- Outstanding Faculty Leadership and Service Award, Ohio University, College of Arts & Sciences 2013–14
- Ann Campbell Brown Service Award, Ohio University, 2011
- Presidential Teaching Award, Ohio University, 2007-2010
- Dean's Outstanding Teacher Award, College of Arts & Sciences, Ohio University, 2004

=== Honors ===
- Phi Beta Kappa
- Sigma Xi, Scientific Research Honor Society
- Gamma Sigma Delta, Honor Society of Agriculture

== Selected publications ==
- Basu P, Kruse CPS, Luesse DR, Wyatt SE (in review) Growth in the Biological Research in Canisters (BRIC) flight hardware results in alterations to the transcriptome and proteome. Advances in Space Research.
- Kruse, C.P.S.; Basu, P.; Luesse, D.R.; Wyatt, S.E. (2017). "Transcriptome and proteome responses in RNAlater preserved tissue of Arabidopsis thaliana". PLOS ONE. 12 (4) e0175943. Bibcode:2017PLoSO..1275943K. doi:10.1371/journal.pone.0175943. PMC 5397022. PMID 28423006.
- Basu, P.; Luesse, D.R.; Wyatt, S.E. (2015). "Proteomic Approaches and Their Application to Plant Gravitropism". Methods in Molecular Biology. Vol. 1309. Springer. pp. 119–132. doi:10.1007/978-1-4939-2697-8_10. ISBN 978-1-4939-2696-1. PMID 25981772.
- Cook CA, Tucker A, Shen K, Wyatt SE (2015) Microarray identifies transcription factors potentially involved in gravitropic signal transduction. Gravitational and Space Research 3:18-27.
- Rothwell, G.W.; Wyatt, S.E.; Tomescu, A.M.F. (2014). "Plant evolution at the interface of paleontology and developmental biology: An organism-centered paradigm". American Journal of Botany. 101 (6): 899–913. doi:10.3732/ajb.1300451. PMID 24879296.
- Tomescu, A.M.F; Wyatt, S.E.; Hasebe, M.; Rothwell, G.W. (2014). "Early evolution of the vascular plant body plan — the missing mechanisms". Current Opinion in Plant Biology. 17C: 126–136. Bibcode:2014COPB...17..126T. doi:10.1016/j.pbi.2013.11.016. PMID 24507504.
- Wyatt, S.E.; Kiss, J.Z. (2013). "Plant tropisms: From Darwin to the International Space Station". American Journal of Botany. 100 (1): 1–3. doi:10.3732/ajb.1200591. PMID 23281390.
- Schenck, C.A.; Nadella, V.; Clay, S.L.; Lindner, J.; Abrams, Z.; Wyatt, S.E. (2013). "A proteomics approach identifies novel proteins involved in gravitropic signal transduction". American Journal of Botany. 100 (1): 194–202. doi:10.3732/ajb.1200339. PMID 23281391.
- Withers, J.C.; Shipp, M.J.; Rupasinghe, S.G.; Sukumar, P.; Schuler, M.A.; Muday, G.K.; Wyatt, S.E. (2013). "Gravity Persistent Signal 1 (GPS1) reveals novel cytochrome P450s involved in gravitropism". American Journal of Botany. 100 (1): 183–193. doi:10.3732/ajb.1200436. PMID 23284057.
- Wang, Y.; Ballard, H.E.; McNally, R.; Wyatt, S.E. (2013). "Gibberellins are involved but not sufficient to trigger a shift between chasmogamous-cleistogamous flower types in Viola pubescens". Journal of the Torrey Botanical Society. 140 (1): 1–8. doi:10.3159/TORREY-D-12-00044.1. S2CID 83732211.
- Shen, K.; Wyatt, S.E.; Nadella, V. (2012). "ArrayOU: A Web Application for Microarray Data Analysis and Visualization". Journal of Biomolecular Techniques. 23 (2): 37–39. doi:10.7171/jbt.2012-2302-001. PMC 3378286. PMID 22754383.
- Sanders, H.; Rothwell, G.W.; Wyatt, S.E. (2011). "Parallel evolution of auxin regulation in rooting systems". Plant Syst. Evol. 291 (3–4): 221–225. Bibcode:2011PSyEv.291..221S. doi:10.1007/s00606-010-0383-1. S2CID 1772911.
- Luesse, DR; Schenck, CA; Berner, BK; Justus, B; Wyatt, SE (2010). "GPS4 is allelic to ARL2: Implications for gravitropic signal transduction". Gravitational and Space Biology. 23: 95–97.
- Nadella, V; Shipp, M.J.; Muday, G.K.; Wyatt, S.E. (2006). "Evidence for Altered Polar and Lateral Auxin Transport in the Gravity Persistent Signal (GPS) Mutants of Arabidopsis". Plant Cell Environ. 29 (4): 682–690. doi:10.1111/j.1365-3040.2005.01451.x. PMID 17080617.
- Wyatt, S.E.; Rashotte, A; Shipp, M.J.; Robertson, D.; Muday, G.K. (2002). "Mutations in the Gravity Persistence Signal Loci in Arabidopsis Disrupt the Perception and/or Signal Transduction of Gravitropic Stimuli". Plant Physiology. 130 (3): 1426–1435. doi:10.1104/pp.102.010579. PMC 166661. PMID 12428007.
