= Gamma Sigma Delta =

American honor society for agriculture

- ΓΣΔ
- Founded: January 13, 1913; 113 years ago Ohio State University
- Type: Honor
- Affiliation: Independent
- Status: Active
- Emphasis: Agriculture
- Scope: International
- Colors: Sand and Forest Green
- Chapters: 53
- Headquarters: Gamma Sigma Delta c/o Kelly Miller; 7189 State Route 104; Lockbourne, Ohio 43137; United States
- Website: www.gammasigmadelta.org

Gamma Sigma Delta (ΓΣΔ), or more fully, the Honor Society of Agriculture, Gamma Sigma Delta, is an international honor society for agriculture students and those in related fields. Founded in 1913, it is the oldest and largest such society for its academic discipline, which also includes Delta Tau Alpha, founded in 1960.

== Purpose ==
The Honor Society of Agriculture, Gamma Sigma Delta, aims ... :

To advance agriculture in all its phases, to maintain and improve relations of agriculture to other industries, and to recognize the responsibility of its members to their fellow men. It seeks to encourage high standards of scholarship, worthy attainment, and a high degree of excellence in the practice of agricultural pursuits.

While founded for the field of agriculture, in 1976 its constitution was expanded to include "... agriculture in its broadest interpretation, including forestry, wildlife conservation, veterinary medicine, and home economics."

== History ==
Gamma Sigma Delta was born out of two predecessor organizations.

Delta Theta Sigma formed in 1905, at Ohio State University. After development of several chapters dissension arose over the nature of that Fraternity, whether it would remain as an honorary society or become a residential, professional fraternity as it had become at the Alpha chapter at Ohio State. The resulting split was acrimonious at the time, where the Alpha chapter was severed from its five daughter chapters. These, in turn, re-organized as a purely honors society under the name Gamma Sigma Delta in 1913, quickly adding additional chapters in 1914 and 1916. Delta Theta Sigma went on to flourish as an agriculture professional fraternity, thus two surviving organizations came from the same Alpha chapter. Gamma Sigma Delta later created its own chapter on the Ohio State campus. Now, where both exist, members occasionally belong to both groups.

Meanwhile, in 1915 at the University of Minnesota, agriculture students there had formed "The Agricultural Honor Society of America," "[intended to] occupy in the College of Agriculture the position taken by Phi Beta Kappa in Colleges of Arts and Sciences," on that campus.

The two honors societies met at Minnesota in 1917, and amalgamated, under the name, The Honor Society of Agriculture, Gamma Sigma Delta.

Gamma Sigma Delta grew rapidly, adding approximately ten chapters each in the decades of the 1950s and 1960. Many remain active today. The Society achieved an international presence with the establishment of a chapter in the Philippines in 1956, followed by a chapter in Honduras in 1989.

== Symbols ==
The Society's emblem is a key, which bears the words "The Honor Society of Agriculture" with the Greek letters ΓΣΔ as its insignia. These three letters stand for the Greek words, Gaea, Syndesmos and Demeter, which in turn were chosen for their symbolism, which is further explained as, "The binding together of earth, the mother of all, and the practice of agriculture, and the arts relating thereto for the welfare of mankind."

Colors of the Society are Sand and Forest Green. The Society makes available an honor cord in its official colors.

== Membership ==
Students of Agriculture and related programs who rank in the upper two-fifths of the junior and senior class. The Society also welcomes graduate school members. A provision was adopted at the founding of the society to allow honorary membership for faculty and experimental station staff who exhibit the characteristic of "an active spirit of investigation in agriculture."

== Governance ==
Governance is vested in an Executive Committee that meets yearly. Conclaves are held biennially, hosted by a rotating series of chapters on even-numbered years.

== Activities ==
The Society recognizes annually a single Outstanding Chapter, with runners-up recognized as either Gold, Silver and Bronze chapters. At the Executive Committee's discretion, up to five chapters may now be awarded at each of these recognition levels. Awardees are given plaques. The Committee also awards the Most Improved Chapter, and seeks to recognize individuals within or without the Fraternity who have contributed to the field of agriculture with the International Distinguished Service To Agriculture Award.

== Chapters ==
The Society has established 56 chapters since 1905. Of these, 53 are active.

== Notable members ==
- Charles W. Albertson (North Carolina State, 2000), North Carolina Senate
- Julian Banzon, biochemist and a National Scientist of the Philippines
- Arthur B. Chapman, animal genetic researcher at the University of Wisconsin–Madison
- Hiralal Chaudhuri, fisheries scientist known as the "father of induced breeding" of carp
- Michael P. Doyle, emeritus Regents Professor of Food Microbiology at the University of Georgia's College of Agricultural and Environmental Sciences
- Richard P. Korf (Cornell, 1992), professor emeritus of mycology at Cornell University
- Carolyn Lawrence-Dill (2013), plant biologist and academic administrator
- Gerald A. Miller, agronomist, professor, and associate dean emeritus at Iowa State University
- José Antonio Molina Rosito (Zamorano, 2006), botanist and Professor emeritus at the Zamorano Pan-American School of Agriculture
- Gundu Hirisave Rama Rao, Emeritus Professor at the Academic Health Center, University of Minnesota
- Henry P. Rusk, dean of the Department of Agriculture, University of Illinois
- Manuel Sánchez (1979), economist and Deputy Governor and member of the Board of Governors at Banco de México
- Leslie Swindale, soil scientist and chairman of the Department Agronomy and Soil Science of the University of Hawaii
- Pete Turnham, Alabama House of Representatives
- Alfreda Johnson Webb, first Black woman licensed to practice veterinary medicine in the United States
- Evelyn J. Weber (honorary), biochemist and professor in the Agronomy Department at the University of Illinois Urbana-Champaign
- Sarah Wyatt, professor in the Department of Environmental and Plant Biology at Ohio University
