= Alwin Nikolais =

American choreographer and composer (1910–1993)

- Alwin Nikolais, photographed by Ralph E. Sandler
- Born: November 25, 1910; Southington, Connecticut, U.S.
- Died: May 8, 1993 (aged 82); New York City, New York, U.S.
- Occupations: choreographer; composer; dancer; musician; educator
- Partner: Murray Louis

Alwin Nikolais (November 25, 1910 – May 8, 1993) was an American choreographer, dancer, composer, musician, and teacher. He created the Nikolais Dance Theatre, and was known for his self-designed innovative costume, lighting, and production design. Nikolais gave the world a new vision of dance and was named the "father of multi-media theater."

== Early life ==
Nikolais was born on November 25, 1910, in Southington, Connecticut. He studied piano at an early age and began his performing career as an organist accompanying silent films. As a young artist, he gained skills in scenic design, acting, puppetry, and music composition. It was after attending a performance by the German dancer Mary Wigman that he was inspired to study dance.

He received his early dance training at Bennington College from the great figures of the modern dance world: Hanya Holm, Martha Graham, Doris Humphrey, Charles Weidman, Louis Horst, and others.

== Career ==
In 1939, in collaboration with Truda Kaschmann, his first modern dance teacher, Nikolais received a commission to create Eight Column Line, his first ballet.

After teaching two years at his own dance studio and touring the United States with Hanya Holm's company, Nikolais did active duty in the United States Army during World War II. Nikolais relocated to New York City following the war and resumed studying with Hanya Holm. Eventually, he became Holm's assistant, teaching at her New York school and at Colorado College during the summers.

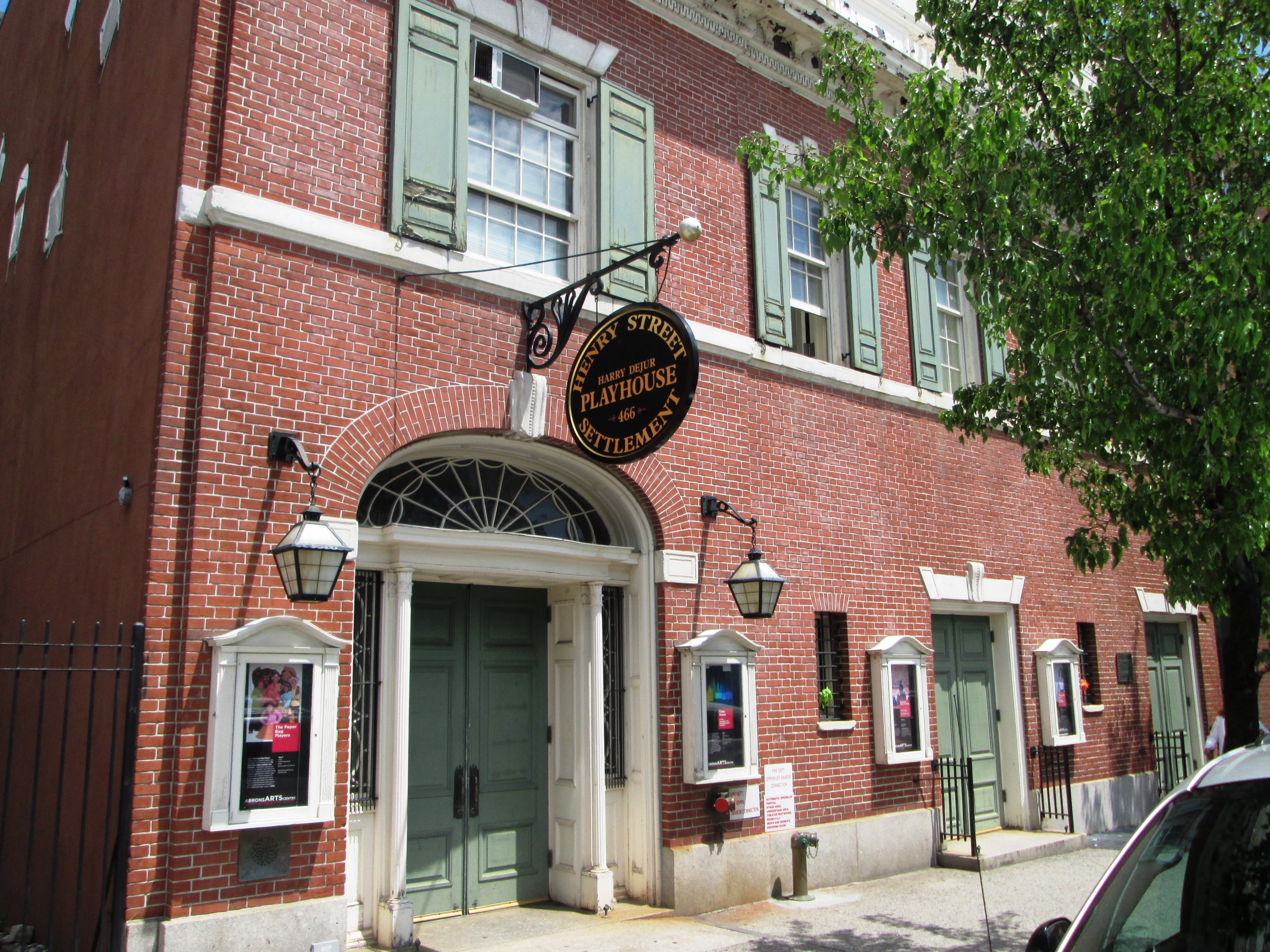
The Neighborhood Playhouse (Henry Street Playhouse) at 466 Grand Street at the corner of Pitt Street on the Lower East Side built in 1913-15 and designed by Ingalls & Hoffman.

In 1949, Nikolais was appointed co-director of the Henry Street Settlement Playhouse, alongside Betty Young. He formed the Playhouse Dance Company, which was later renamed the Nikolais Dance Theatre. It was at Henry Street that Nikolais began to develop his own world of abstract dance theatre, portraying man as part of a total environment. Nikolais redefined dance as "the art of motion which, left on its own merits, becomes the message as well as the medium". He stated "the Province of art is to explore the inner mechanisms and extra dimensional areas of life and, out of the exploration, to produce its findings translated into the form of the artist's media." It was also at Henry Street Playhouse that Nikolais was joined by Murray Louis, who was to become a driving force in the Playhouse Company, Nikolais' leading dancer and longtime collaborator.

In 1956, the Nikolais Dance Theater was invited to its first of many appearances at the American Dance Festival. With this, and a number of appearances on television’s The Steve Allen Show, his total dance theatre began to take shape, and the company established itself at the forefront of American contemporary dance. In the 1960s his choreographic artistry was showcased on live network television for the CBS Repertoire Workshop.

Following the Audio Engineering Society convention, in October 1964, Nikolais saw and immediately placed an order for the first Moog analog synthesizer system.

With the company's 1968 Paris season at the Théâtre des Champs-Élysées, Nikolais' impact on dance grew internationally and the company began performing around the world. In 1971, his company began an artistic relationship with the Théâtre de la Ville which continues to the present day.

In 1978, the French National Ministry of Culture invited him to form the Centre Nationale de la Danse Contemporaine in Angers, France. In December 1980, he created his 99th choreographic work, Schéma, for the Paris Opera. At the same time, his choreography for an opera by Gian Carlo Menotti was being staged at the Vienna Staatsoper.

Nikolais was granted five honorary doctorate degrees, was twice designated a Guggenheim Fellow, and was the recipient of a three-year creativity grant from the Andrew W. Mellon Foundation. Nikolais and his work have been featured in numerous films and television programs in the US and abroad. In July 1987, Nik and Murray, a feature-length documentary film about Nikolais and Murray Louis, directed by Christian Blackwood, aired on the PBS series American Masters. His work Tensile Involvement is featured in the opening of Robert Altman’s film The Company.

Nikolais was renowned as a teacher, and his pedagogy is taught in schools and universities throughout the world. He died of cancer May 8, 1993, in New York and is buried in Père Lachaise Cemetery in Paris.

== His style ==
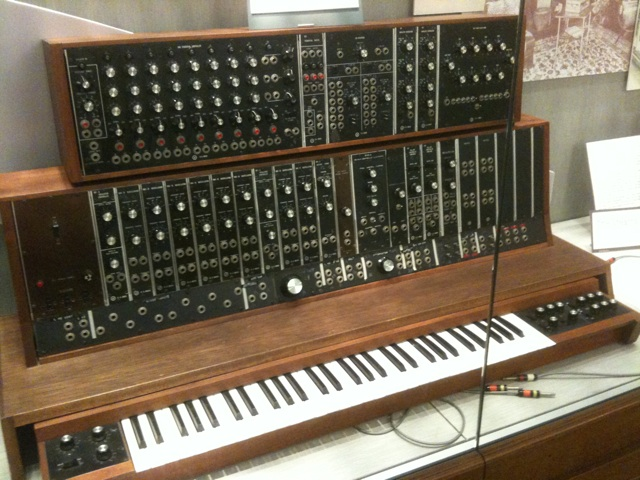
Nikolais was the first customer for the newly developed Moog synthesizer in 1964.

Nikolais employed lights, slides, electronic music, and stage props to create environments through which dancers moved and, more importantly, into which they blended (Dance Magazine, 1968). He would commonly use props with aesthetic as well as functional purposes; for instance, a traveler moving across the stage would hide a crossing and simultaneously create a volume of motion. His 1953 production Masks, Props, and Mobiles is credited with creating and popularizing modern multimedia theater (Mazo, Joseph). Some critics refused to categorize Nikolais’ work as dance, for example when he transformed the bodies of dancers by covering them in plastic bags that would stretch and change shapes in “Noumenon,” a section from Masks, Props, and Mobiles. He avoided overused themes like psychosexuality, good against evil, or heroes and heroines. Instead, he chose to move away from the life of the individual and focus on group action. He preferred also to develop his own style of movement, and not to replicate the moves of previous periods or other choreographers. He expanded the use of music in dance from being mainly a way of marking time or adding emotional value to a way to create new sounds to add to his new theatrical environments. He was among the first customers for the newly developed Moog synthesizer in 1964.

Nikolais' artistic mandate was for meaning to be conveyed strictly through movement. He characterized his stage presentations as "decentralizing" the dancer, so that humans were only one of the theatrical elements on stage. Nikolais despised modern dance's obsession with self.

Nikolais used a barefoot dance technique. He preferred it for practical reasons, viewing the muscular and tactile functions of bare feet as essential to the total body. He worked to incorporate this into the body design of the dancers' costumes, sometimes making the device a primary part of the design concept. For example, in "Discs," dancers wore colored aluminum discs on one of their feet. In addition to extending a dancer's base and range of balance, they also added vertical extension. Shape, color, and material provided both visual and auditory elements. In "Stratus and Nimbus" and "Scenario," dancers wore sound-producing fiberboard circles on their feet, altering the dancer's movement to create aural effects.

Nikolais placed great emphasis on sensory experience through which a dancer's dynamic action is conveyed to the audience. He emphasized that perception of one area can be emphasized by deliberately blocking out consciousness in other unwanted areas. In the 1950s Nikolais used blackface, whiteface, and colored makeup both to create and prevent sensory blocking, manipulating perceptions of race in dances such as Prism and Imago. In using makeup in this way, he was concerned with design, rather than creating character.

Nikolais used lighting extensively, directing light from multiple directions and levels and using it to create shape, space, and silhouettes. He returned to his early work as a musical composer to design his own score for choreography using electronic tape. At the Henry Street Playhouse (now Abrons Arts Center), a seven speaker system was used to play the score from throughout the room, giving it dimensions of time and space. Combining cast, lighting, and music with modern dance techniques gained him a world-wide reputation for theatrical arts. Nikolais received high honors from New York State Council on the Arts, Hofstra University, Rutgers University, Duke University, Hunter College, and Brigham Young University.

Nikolais was known amongst colleagues and peers as shy and reserved. He allowed his partner Murray Louis to deal with public affairs, preferring to focus on his school and theatre. Nikolais was renowned as a teacher, and his pedagogy is taught in schools and universities throughout the world. Nikolais, referring to his students, said: "Each student is encouraged toward the highest aesthetic values, and upon creative fluency and achievement, as well as technical skill. The job of the teacher is to pursue, institute and constantly anticipate the best possible activities coinciding with this idealistic thesis."

== Awards ==
In 1987, Nikolais was awarded the National Medal of Arts, bestowed by President Ronald Reagan, and the Kennedy Center Honors, conferred during a three-day round of official Washington events, which culminated in a CBS telecast featuring the Nikolais Dance Theater.

He received the City of Paris' highest honor, the Grande Medaille de Vermeille de la Ville de Paris, as well as medals from Seville, Spain, Athens, Greece, and 30 other cities both foreign and national as well as a special citation from New York City's Mayor, which he shared with Murray Louis. Often referred to as the American Patriarch of French modern dance, Nikolais is a knight of France's Legion of Honor and a commander of the Order of Arts and Letters. In 2000, he was inducted into the National Museum of Dance and Hall of Fame.

His accolades from the world of arts and letters included the Samuel H. Scripps American Dance Festival Award; the Capezio Award; Circulo Criticos Award, Chile; Emmy Citation Award; Dance Magazine Award (1968); the Tiffany Award; and the American Dance Guild Award.

== Choreographies ==
Nikolais’ first production, after the creation of the Henry Street Settlement Playhouse (now Abrons Arts Center), was called Kaleidoscope (1953), and premiered at the American Dance Festival. A few of his over one hundred choreographic pieces are listed here.

- 1953, Kaleidoscope
- 1953, Masks, Props, and Mobiles
- 1953, Tensile Involvement
- 1953, Noumenon Mobilus
- 1955, Noumenon
- 1960, Totem
- 1963, Imago suite
- 1963, Arcade
- 1963, Artisan
- 1964, Sanctum
- 1964, Water Studies
- 1978, Gallery
- 1979, Count Down
- 1980, Mechanical Organ
- 1982, Dime in the Slot (part of Mechanical Organ)
- 1982, Pond
- 1982, Two not yet together
- 1985, Crucible
- 1987, BLANK on BLANK
- Girls Trio
- Mantis

== Archives ==
The Ohio University Libraries in Athens, Ohio is home to the Alwin Nikolais and Murray Louis Dance Collection. An archival collection containing films, photographs, posters, awards, programs, reviews, and musical recordings. Ohio University also holds the Gladys Bailin papers - a student of Nikolais, dancer in the Nikolais Dance Company, and Distinguished Professor of dance at Ohio University.
