= Murray Louis =

American choreographer

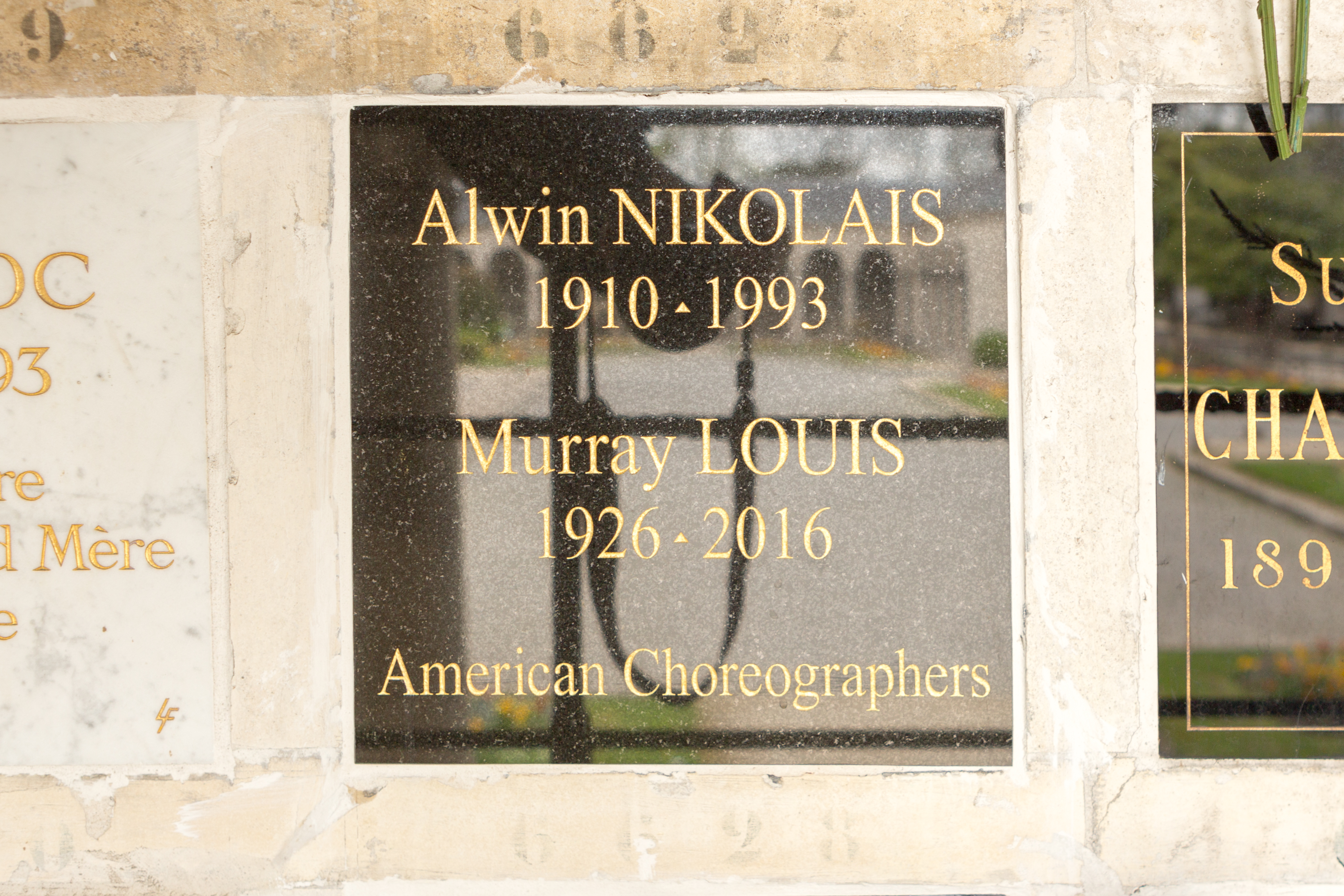
- Tomb of Alwin Nikolais and Murray Louis
- Born: November 4, 1926; Brooklyn, New York
- Died: February 1, 2016 (aged 89); New York City
- Occupations: choreographer; dancer
- Partner: Alwin Nikolais

Murray Louis (November 4, 1926 – February 1, 2016) was an American modern dancer and choreographer.

== Life ==
Louis was known as one of the most influential American modern dancers and choreographers. Born in Brooklyn, New York, he grew up in Manhattan near Henry Street where he would later attend class at the Henry Street Playhouse and also start his company. He was one out of five children and his mother died when he was eight years old. He was then sent to an orphanage until he was twelve. At this time his sister Ethel, who was studying dance at the time, took him to many modern dance concerts. He graduated from Samuel J. Tilden High School in 1944.

Louis was discharged from the U.S. Navy in 1946 and began to live in San Francisco, California. He then enrolled at Colorado College for a summer session conducted by Hanya Holm in 1949. It was there during one of their workshops where he met Alwin Nikolais, who would later become his mentor and lifelong partner. That year he moved back to New York to pursue a Dramatic Arts degree at New York University and attend class with Nikolais at Henry Street Playhouse. Louis made his debut as the lead soloist in Nikolais' newly formed Playhouse Dance Company (which would later be renamed the Nikolais Dance Theater). He died in New York City on February 1, 2016, at the age of 89.

== Career ==
Louis was chosen as Associate Director to Nikolais and together they created the Nikolais/Louis dance technique, which would go on to become a major influence on modern dance and is still taught by his students. Louis founded his own company in 1968 known as the Murray Louis Dance Company. His company was then chosen to represent the U.S. State Department on a two-month tour of India in 1968. In 1972 he piloted the "Artist in School" program. He also created two works for Rudolph Nureyev which premiered on Broadway in 1978. Louis additionally worked in television in the United States and Europe. For example, in the 1960s his artistry as both a dancer and choreographer were showcased on live network television for the CBS Repertoire Workshop. In 1984 the Murray Louis Dance Company collaborated with the Dave Brubeck Quartet and had four very successful seasons, which were broadcast in the United States, Europe and Japan. Some of his choreographed works produced for television station outside of the United States include; Pulcinello for the Batsheva Dance Company on Israeli television and The Tales of Cri-Cri for Mexico City television. In July 1987 PBS televised Nik and Murray, an award-winning documentary film by Christian Blackwood, in their American Masters series. The Princeton Book Publishing Company released a video called Murray Louis in Concert, a collection of solos in 1989.

Louis also had his collection of essays, Inside Dance, published by St. Martin's Press and released a five-part film series, Dance as an Art Form, which is now used as an introduction series for Educational Arts programs in the United States. A Cappella Books published his second book of essays, On Dance. Louis's and Nikolais' dance companies merged in 1989. On May 8, 1993, Louis's most influential mentor and partner, Alwin Nikolais, died. Louis did not dance for 2 years after Nikolais' death. In 1995 his company performed at Carnegie Hall for 10,000 children during their "LINK" program and in 1996 he completed a five-part video series titled, The World of Alwin Nikolais.

== Work and accomplishments ==
Louis had many accomplishments and received copious numbers of awards, recognitions, and honorary degrees. He received the Dance Magazine award in 1977, which was presented to him by his former dance instructor Hanya Holm. He also received a Thank You letter from President Harry Truman, the Colorado Contemporary Dance Award, two John Simon Guggenheim Fellowships and the Scripps/American Dance Festival award (June 18, 2006). In 1998, he was selected as a Phi Beta Kappa Visiting Scholar for a "distinguished lecture" tour of twelve universities and colleges in the United States. Louis received his first Honorary Degree from Indiana University in 1970, his Honorary Doctorate of Performing Arts from Ohio University in 1999, his second Honorary Degree from Rutgers University in 2000, and his third Honorary Degree from the Boston Conservatory in 2004. In 1998 Louis started assembling his archives and they are now available at the Ohio University's Vernon R. Alden Library in Athens, Ohio. He created more than one hundred works (including 70 ballets), performed in 20 nations and every state of the United States, and toured five continents. He is one of the few choreographers to have danced in his own creations and a variety of composers produced music for him and his performances. He also choreographed to the music of Bach, Brahms, Schubert, Stravinsky, Tchaikovsky and many others composers. Some of the companies he choreographed dances for include; the Royal Danish Ballet, the Jose Limon Company, the Hamburg Opera Ballet, the Scottish Ballet, the Berlin Opera Ballet, and the Cleveland Ballet.

Louis speaking of his choreography once said, "I don't have a style. I come out of dance itself. I operate the principles of dance the way I talk. I get a point of view. Each piece has its own identity. It's what choreography is all about."

Murray Louis lived and worked in New York City, New York.
