= List of FarmHouse members =

The following list of FarmHouse members includes notable initiated brothers of FarmHouse fraternity.

== Agriculture ==
Name	Original chapter	Notability	Ref.
Henry Beachell	University of Nebraska–Lincoln	Plant breeder whose research led to the development of hybrid rice cultivars that saved millions of people from starvation	
D. Howard Doane	University of Missouri	Founder of Doane Agricultural Services, served on an agriculture task force to reorganize the U.S. Department of Agriculture under President Herbert Hoover, co-founder of FarmHouse fraternity	
Orville Vogel	University of Nebraska–Lincoln	Scientist and wheat breeder whose research led to the "Green Revolution" in world food production	
Travis Park	Purdue University	Professor at North Carolina State University; National FFA advisor and chair of the National FFA Board of Directors.	

== Athletics and entertainment ==
Name	Original chapter	Notability	Ref.
Don Faurot	University of Missouri	Head football coach for various schools including the University of Missouri (1926–1956), invented the Split-T formation, inducted into the College Football Hall of Fame as a coach in 1961	
Pat Green	Texas Tech University	Texas country music artist best known for "Wave on Wave" (2003)	
Michael Martin Murphey	Honorary member	Western music artist who has recorded six gold albums including Cowboy Songs (1990)	
Leroy Van Dyke	University of Missouri	Country music artist best known for "The Auctioneer" (1956) and "Walk On By" (1961)	

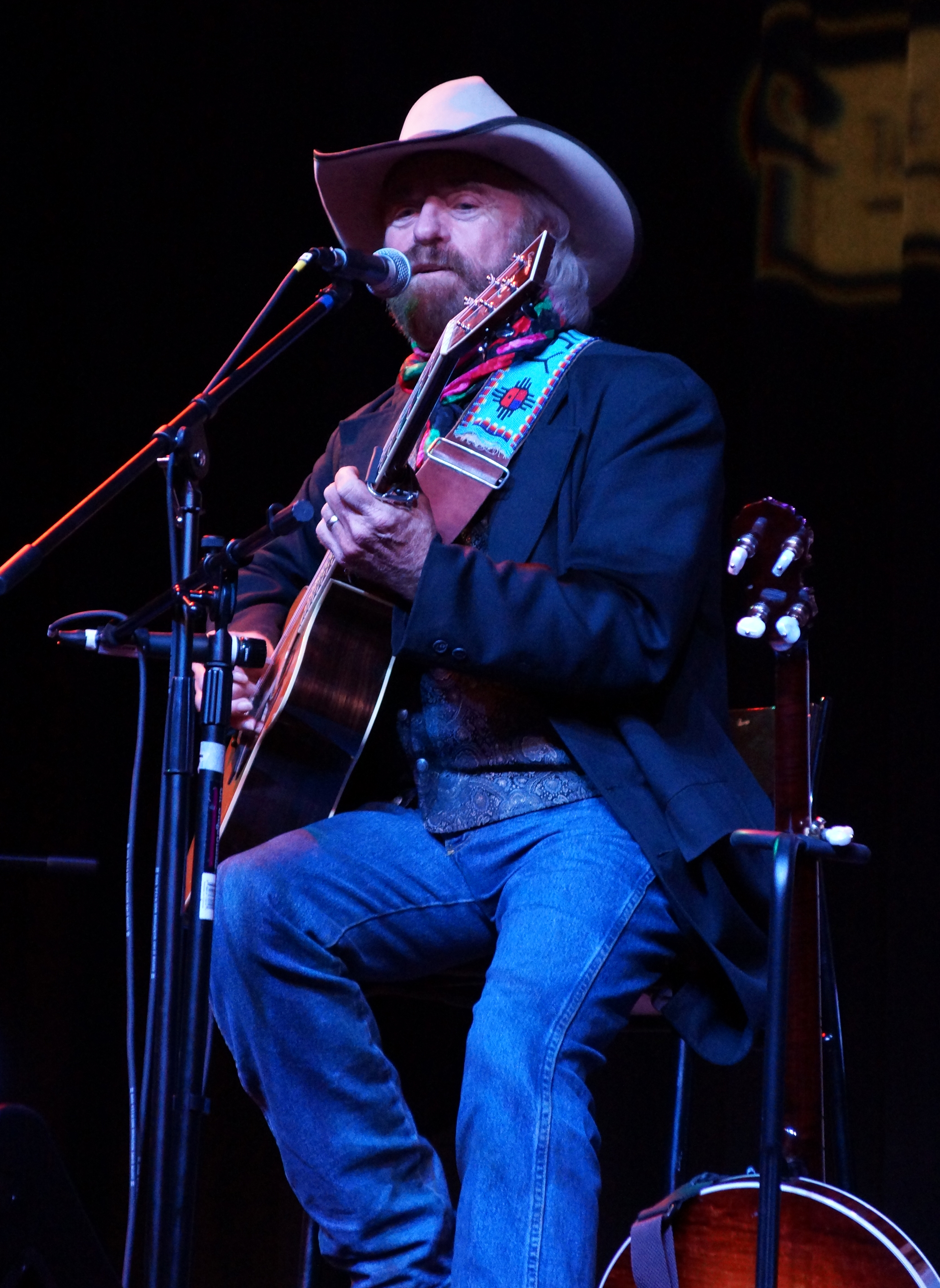
Michael Martin Murphey

== Business ==
Name	Original chapter	Notability	Ref.
Jim Fitterling	University of Missouri	Chairman and CEO of Dow Inc. (2018–present)	
Roy Reiman	Iowa State University	Founder of Reiman Publications	
Evan Williams	University of Nebraska–Lincoln	Co-founder and CEO of Twitter (2008–2010)	

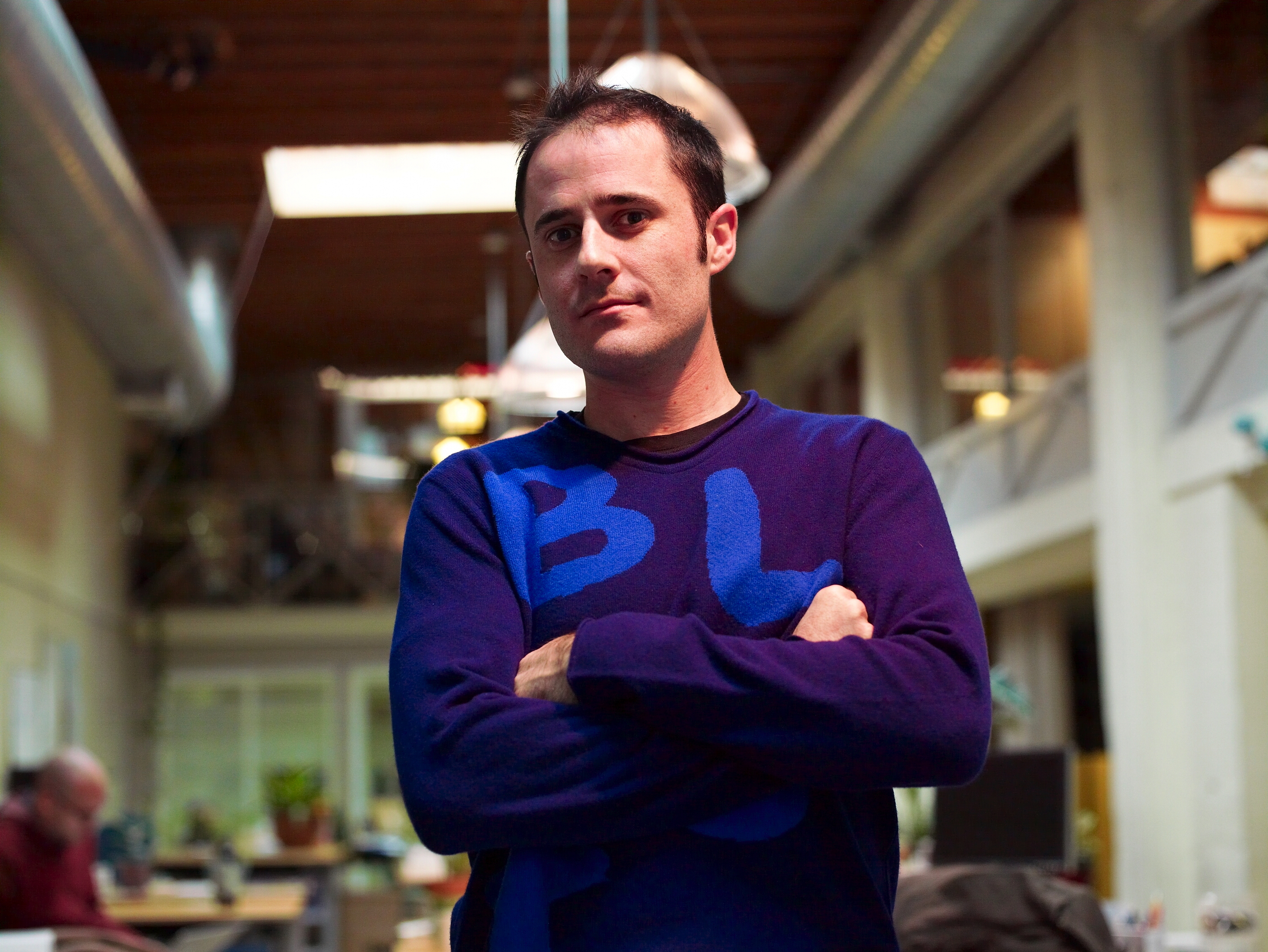
Evan Williams

== Education ==
Name	Original chapter	Notability	Ref.
George Beadle	University of Nebraska–Lincoln	President of the University of Chicago (1961–1968), known for the one gene–one enzyme hypothesis, awarded the 1958 Nobel Prize in Physiology or Medicine	
Steven C. Beering	Purdue University	President of Purdue University (1983–2000)	
Hilton Briggs	Iowa State University	President of South Dakota State University (1958–1975), dean of Agriculture and director of Agricultural Experiment Station at the University of Wyoming (1950–1958)	
John R. Campbell	University of Missouri	President of Oklahoma State University (1988–1993)	
William L. Giles	Honorary member	President of Mississippi State University (1966–1976)	
Robert F. Howard	University of Missouri	Chairman of the Department of Horticulture at the University of Nebraska–Lincoln (1914–1924), co-founder of FarmHouse fraternity	
Henry H. Krusekopf	University of Missouri	Professor and researcher in the College of Agriculture at the University of Missouri for 48 years, co-founder of FarmHouse fraternity	
M. Peter McPherson	Michigan State University	President of Michigan State University (1993–2004), Administrator of the United States Agency for International Development (1981–1987)	
C. Brice Ratchford	Honorary member	President of the University of Missouri System (1970–1976)	
Henry P. Rusk	University of Missouri	Chair of the Department of Animal Husbandry at the University of Illinois at Urbana–Champaign (1922–1939), chair of the Commission on Agriculture under President Herbert Hoover (1948–1954), co-founder of FarmHouse fraternity	
Melvin E. Sherwin	University of Missouri	Chair of the Soils Department at North Carolina State University (1910–1924), co-founder of FarmHouse fraternity	

George Beadle

== Government ==
Name	Original chapter	Notability	Ref.
Rick Berg	North Dakota State University	U.S. representative from North Dakota (2011–2013), majority leader of the North Dakota House of Representatives (2003–2009), member of the North Dakota House of Representatives (1985–2011)	
John W. Carlin	Kansas State University	Archivist of the United States (1995–2005), 40th Governor of Kansas (1979–1987), chair of the National Governors Association (1984–1985)	
Reid W. Crawford	Iowa State University	Member of the Iowa House of Representatives (1973–1981)	
Cory Gardner	Colorado State University	U.S. senator from Colorado (2015–2021), chair of the National Republican Senatorial Committee (2017–2019), U.S. representative from Colorado (2011–2015), member of the Colorado House of Representatives (2005–2011)	
L. Steven Grasz	University of Nebraska–Lincoln	U.S. circuit judge of the United States Court of Appeals for the Eighth Circuit (2018–present)	
Clifford R. Hope	Honorary member	U.S. representative from Kansas (1927–1957)	
Kenny Hulshof	University of Missouri	U.S. representative from Missouri (1997–2009)	
Claude B. Hutchison	University of Missouri	Mayor of Berkeley, California (1955–1963), dean of Agriculture at the University of Nevada, Reno (1952–1954), co-founder of FarmHouse fraternity	
Bill Northey	Iowa State University	4th United States Under Secretary of Agriculture for Farm Production and Conservation at USDA (2018–Present), Iowa Secretary of Agriculture (2007–2018)	
Steve Pearce	New Mexico State University	U.S. representative from New Mexico (2003–2009, 2011–2019), chair of the Republican Party of New Mexico (2018–present)	
Mike Revis	University of Missouri	Member of the Missouri House of Representatives (2018–2019)	
Don Stenberg	University of Nebraska–Lincoln	Treasurer of Nebraska (2011–2019), 30th Nebraska attorney general (1991–2003)	
Dale E. Wolf	University of Nebraska–Lincoln	70th governor of Delaware (1992–1993), 22nd lieutenant governor of Delaware (1989–1992)	
Clayton Yeutter	University of Nebraska–Lincoln	Counselor to the President (1992–1993), chair of the Republican National Committee (1991–1992), United States Secretary of Agriculture (1989–1991), U.S. Trade Representative (1985–1989)	

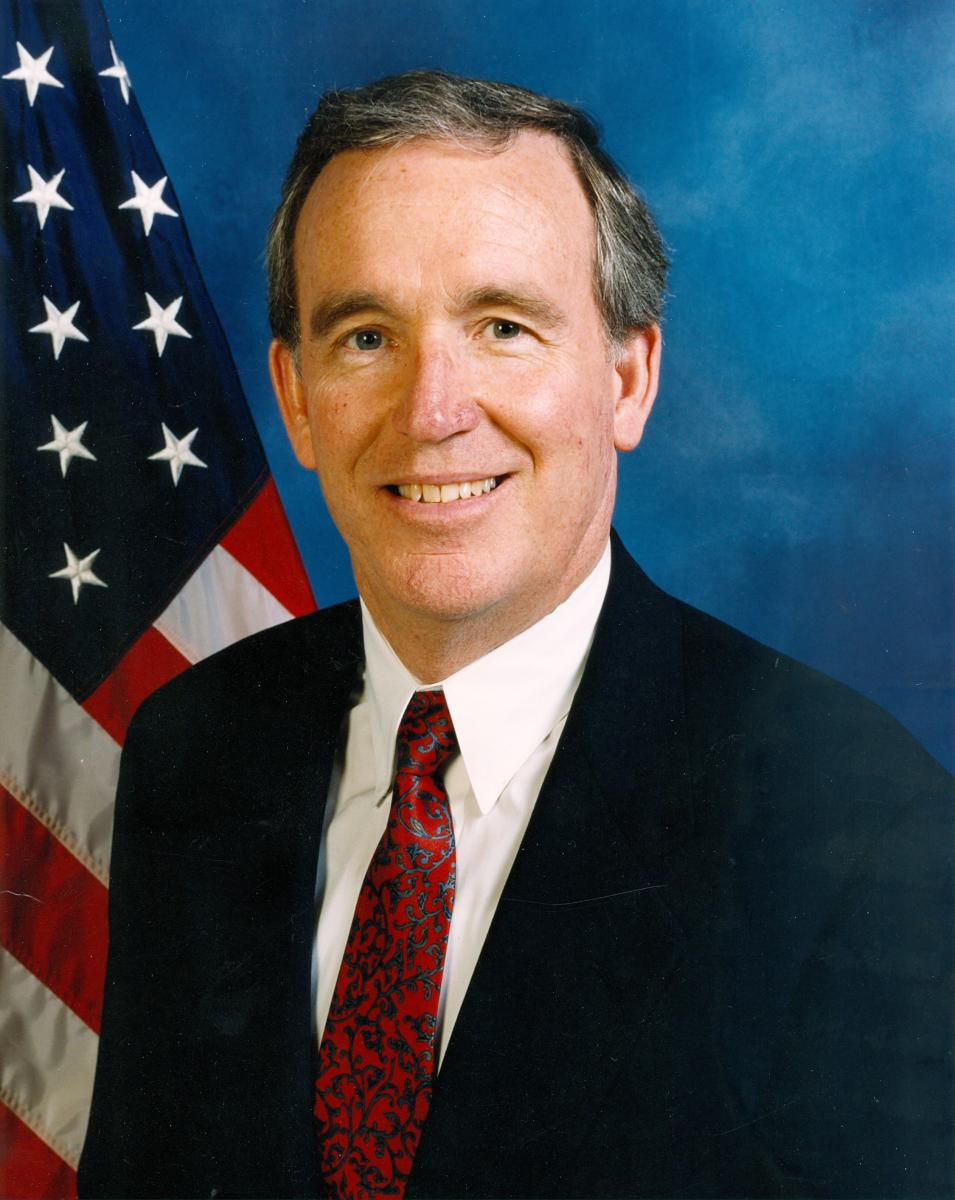
John W. Carlin

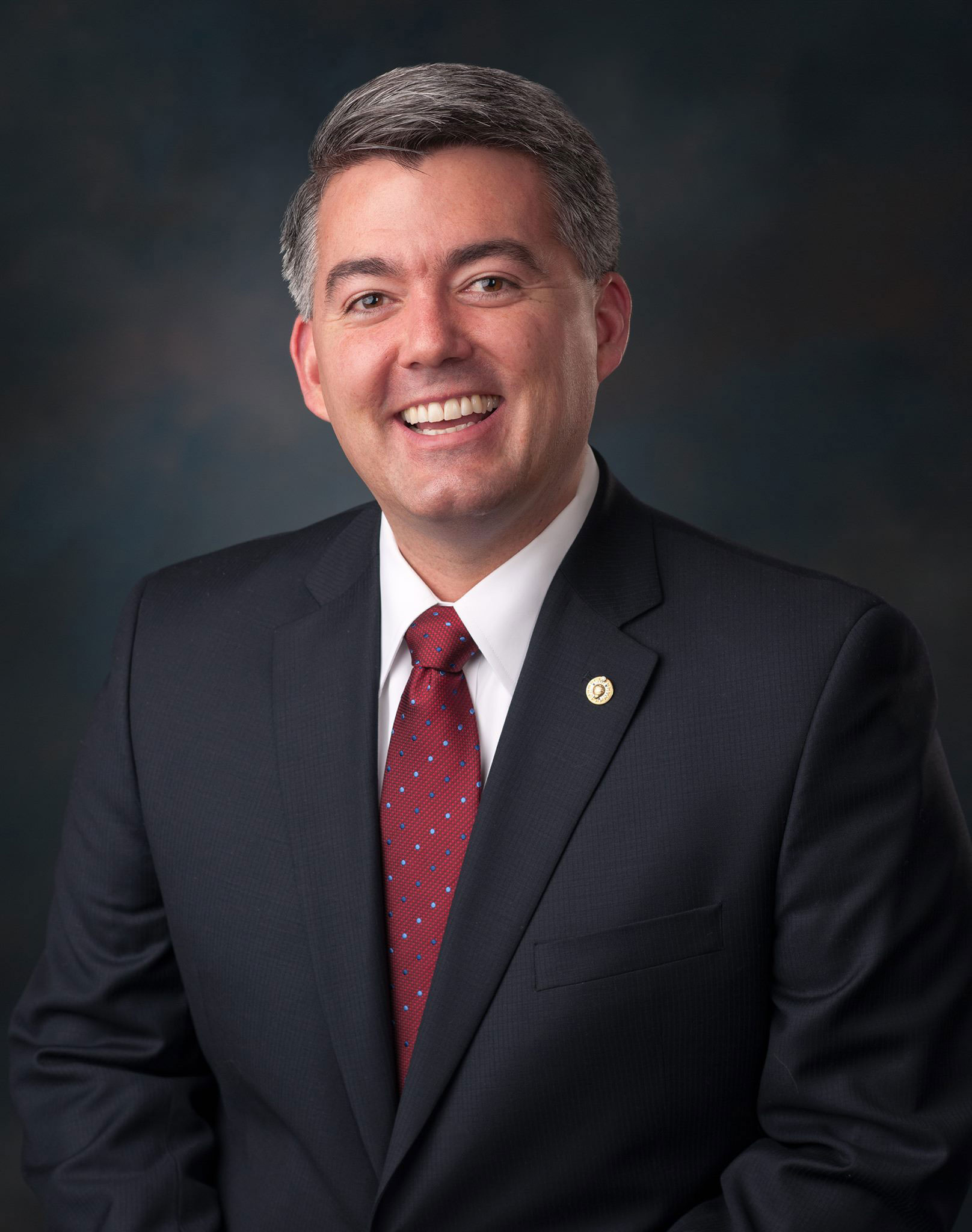
Cory Gardner

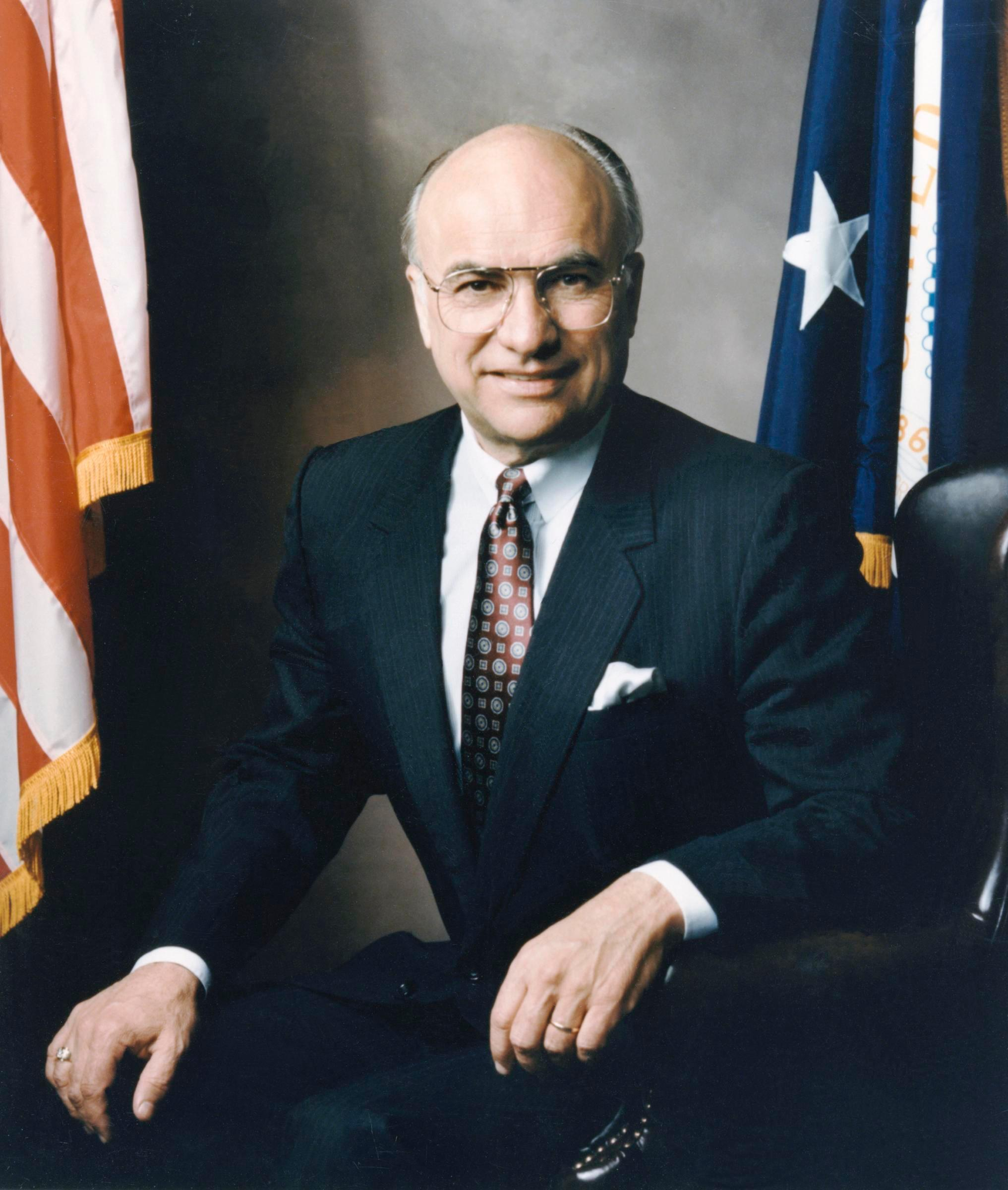
Clayton Yeutter
