= Fraternities and sororities in Canada =

The expansion of Greek letter organizations into Canada was an important stage of the North American fraternity movement, beginning in 1879 with the establishment of a chapter of Zeta Psi at the University of Toronto. In 1883, the same fraternity established a chapter at McGill University. Other early foundations were Kappa Alpha Society at Toronto in 1892 and at McGill in 1899, and Alpha Delta Phi at Toronto in 1893 and at McGill in 1897. The first sorority, Kappa Alpha Theta, was established in Toronto in 1887. In 1902, the first international chapter of Phi Delta Theta was established at McGill University as the Quebec Alpha.

The development of the fraternity system in Canada has made great progress in these two universities. In 1927 Baird's Manual of American College Fraternities reported the existence of 42 chapters at the University of Toronto and 23 chapters at McGill University. A few chapters were also reported from the University of British Columbia, University of Calgary, Carleton University, Dalhousie University, University of Manitoba, Queen's University, University of Western Ontario, McMaster University, Wilfrid Laurier University, University of Waterloo, Brock University and University of Alberta.

== Canadian fraternities ==
Following is a list of Canadian fraternities. Chapter counts included Canadian chapters only for international fraternities. Organizations that are inactive in Canada are indicated in italic.

Organization	Symbols	Charter date and range	Founding location	Type	Scope	Affiliation	Active Canadian chapters	Status in Canada	Ref.
Acacia	Ακακία	May 12, 1904	University of Michigan at Ann Arbor	Social	International	NIC	1	Active	
Alpha Delta Phi	ΑΔΦ	October 29, 1832	Hamilton College	Social and literary	International	NIC	3	Active	
Alpha Epsilon Pi	ΑΕΠ	November 7, 1913	New York University	Jewish	International	FFC	10	Active	
Alpha Kai Omega	ΑΚΩ	1929	W. D. Lowe High School	Sports	Local	Independent	1	Active	
Alpha Kappa Psi	ΑΚΨ	October 5, 1904	New York University	Professional (business)	International	PFA	2	Active	
Alpha Omega	ΑΩ	1907	Baltimore, Maryland	Professional (dentistry) and Jewish	International	PFA	3	Active	(Note: Neither Baird's (20th edition) nor the national website specifies a founding date.)
Alpha Phi Alpha	ΑΦΑ	December 4, 1906	Cornell University	Social, African-American	International	NIC, NPHC	1	Active	
Alpha Phi Omega	ΑΦΩ	December 16, 1925	Lafayette College	Service	International	PFA	1	Active	
Alpha Sigma Phi	ΑΣΦ	December 6, 1845	Yale University	Social	International	FFC	3	Active	
Alpha Tau Omega	ΑΤΩ	September 11, 1865 – xxxx ?	Virginia Military Institute	Social	International	NIC	0	Inactive	
Beta Theta Pi	ΒΘΠ	August 8, 1839	Miami University	Social	International	NIC	3	Active	
Brotherhood of Omicron	Ο	January 1965	Concordia University	Secret society	Local	Independent	1	Active	
Delta Chi	ΔΧ	October 13, 1890	Cornell University	Social	International	NIC	1	Active	
Delta Kappa Epsilon	ΔΚΕ	June 22, 1844	Yale University	Social	International	NIC	7	Active	
Delta Lambda Phi	ΔΛΦ	October 15, 1986	Washington, D.C.	Social, Gay/Bisexual	International	NIC	0	Inactive	
Delta Sigma Phi	ΔΣΦ	December 10, 1899 – xxxx ?	City College of New York	Social	International	NIC	0	Inactive	
Delta Tau Delta	ΔΤΔ	October 1858–xxxx ?	Bethany College	Social	International	NIC	0	Inactive	(Note: Records of Delta Tau Delta's founding are scant. Baird's (20th edition) says spring of 1858, but other records indicate formation in the fall of that year tied to a response to electioneering of a predecessor campus organization. October is therefore conjectural.)
Delta Upsilon	ΔΥ	November 4, 1834	Williams College	Social	International	NIC	4	Active	
Episkopon	Επισκοπῶν	1858	University of Toronto	Secret society	Local	Independent			
FarmHouse	FH	April 15, 1905	University of Missouri	Social	International	NIC	1	Active	
Gamma Beta Lambda	ΓΒΛ	October 2, 1963 – xxxx ?	Vancouver, British Columbia	Social	Local	Independent	0	Inactive	
Kappa Alpha Society	ΚΑ	November 26, 1825	Union College	Literary and social	International	NIC	2	Active	
Kappa Sigma	ΚΣ	December 10, 1869	University of Virginia	Social	International	Independent	9	Active	
Lambda Chi Alpha	ΛΧΑ	November 2, 1909	Boston University	Social	International	Independent	3	Active	
Lambda Phi Epsilon	ΛΦΕ	February 25, 1981	University of California, Los Angeles	Asian-interest	International	NIC	2	Active	
Omega Psi Phi	ΩΨΦ	November 17, 1911	Howard University	Social, African-American	International	NPHC	1	Active	
Omega Theta Alpha	ΩΘΑ	September 5, 2002	University of Ottawa	Social	Local	Independent	1	Active	
Omega Xi	ΩΞ	2011–20xx ?	University of Saskatchewan	Social	Local	Independent	0	Inactive	
Phi Beta Sigma	ΦΒΣ	January 9, 1914	Howard University	Social, African-American	International	NPHC	1	Active	
Phi Delta Theta	ΦΔΘ	December 26, 1848	Miami University	Social	International	Independent	11	Active	
Phi Gamma Delta	ΦΓΔ	May 1, 1848	Jefferson College	Social	International	NIC	5	Active	
Phi Kappa Pi	ΦΚΠ	March 22, 1913	McGill University and University of Toronto	Social	National	Independent	4	Active	
Phi Kappa Sigma	ΦΚΣ	August 16, 1850	University of Pennsylvania	Social	International	NIC	1	Active	
Phi Sigma Kappa	ΦΣΚ	March 15, 1873 – xxxx ?	University of Massachusetts Amherst	Social	International	NIC	0	Inactive	
Pi Kappa Alpha	ΠΚΑ	March 1, 1868	University of Virginia	Social	International	NIC	4	Active	
Pi Lambda Phi	ΠΛΦ	March 21, 1895 – xxxx ?	Yale University	Social	International	NIC	0	Inactive	
Psi Lambda Phi	ΨΛΦ	March 27, 2014	St. Thomas University / University of New Brunswick, Fredericton	Social and service	Local	Independent	0	Inactive	
Psi Upsilon	ΨΥ	November 24, 1833	Union College	Social	International	NIC	1	Active	
Sigma Alpha Epsilon	ΣΑΕ	March 9, 1856	University of Alabama	Social	International	NIC	1	Active	
Sigma Alpha Mu	ΣΑΜ	November 26, 1909	College of the City of New York	Social	International	NIC	1	Active	
Sigma Chi	ΣΧ	June 28, 1855	Miami University	Social	International	NIC	10	Active	
Sigma Nu	ΣΝ	January 1, 1869 – xxxx ?	Virginia Military Institute	Social	International	NIC	0	Inactive	
Sigma Phi Delta	ΣΦΔ	April 11, 1924	University of Southern California	Professional (engineering)	International	PFA	2	Active	
Sigma Pi	ΣΠ	February 26, 1897	Vincennes University	Social	International	NIC	0	Inactive	
Sigma Thêta Pi	ΣΘΠ	September 21, 2003	Université Joseph Fourier and Université Pierre Mendès-France	Social	International	Independent	2	Active	
Tau Kappa Epsilon	ΤΚΕ	January 10, 1899	Illinois Wesleyan University	Social	International	Independent	3	Active	
Theta Chi	ΘΧ	April 10, 1856	Norwich University	Social	International	NIC	1	Active	
Theta Delta Chi	ΘΔΧ	October 31, 1847	Union College	Social	International	NIC	1	Active	
Theta Gamma	ΘΓ	January 1912 – xxxx ?	St. Lawrence University	Social	International		0	Inactive	(Note: Founding date is conjectural; the Fraternity notes early meetings over Christmas break of 1911 to form a fraternity. The national website does not specify the date.)
Theta Sigma	ΘΣ	1974–xxxx ?	Concordia University	Social	Local	Independent	0	Inactive	
Theta Tau Nu	ΘΤΝ	2013–20xx ?	University of New Brunswick, Fredericton	Social	Local	Independent	0	Inactive	
Xi Alpha Pi	ΞΑΠ	September 28, 2008	University of Toronto Scarborough	Multicultural-interest	Local	Independent	1	Active	
Zeta Beta Tau	ΖΒΤ	December 29, 1898	City College of New York	Jewish	International	NIC	1	Active	
Zeta Psi	ΖΨ	June 1, 1847	New York University	Social	International	NIC	13	Active	

== Canadian sororities ==
Following is a list of Canadian sororities. Chapter counts included Canadian chapters only for international fraternities. Organizations that are Inactive in Canada indicated in italic.

Organization	Symbols	Charter date and range	Founding location	Type	Scope	Affiliation	Active Canadian chapters	Status in Canada	Ref.
Alpha Chi Theta	ΑΧθ	April 20, 2013	University of Victoria	Social	Local	Independent	1	Active	
Alpha Epsilon Phi	ΑΕΦ	October 24, 1909	Barnard College	Jewish	International	NPC	1	Active	
Alpha Delta Pi	ΑΔΠ	May 15, 1851	Wesleyan College	Social	International	NPC	2	Active	
Alpha Gamma Delta	ΑΓΔ	May 30, 1904	Syracuse University	Social	International	NPC	8	Active	
Alpha Gamma Phi	ΑΓΦ	July 27, 2015	Nipissing University	Social	Local	Independent	1	Active	
Alpha Kappa Alpha	ΑΚΑ	January 15, 1908	Howard University	African-American	International	NPHC	1	Active	
alpha Kappa Delta Phi	αΚΔΦ	February 7, 1990	University of California, Berkeley	Asian-interest	International	NAPA	1	Active	
Alpha Omega	ΑΩ	October 27, 1993	Wilfrid Laurier University	Social	Local	Independent	1	Active	
Alpha Omega Epsilon	ΑΩΕ	November 13, 1983	Marquette University	Professional (engineering)	International	PFA	2	Active	
Alpha Omicron Pi	ΑΟΠ	January 2, 1897	Barnard College	Social	International	NPC	7	Active	
Alpha Phi	ΑΦ	October 10, 1872	Syracuse University	Social	International	NPC	8	Active	
Alpha Pi Beta	ΑΠΒ	1994	University of Northern British Columbia	Social	Local	Independent	1	Active	
Alpha Pi Phi	ΑΠΦ	February 26, 2009	Carleton University	Social	International	Independent	10	Active	
Alpha Psi	ΑΨ	June 24, 2004	University of Alberta	Social	Local	Independent	1	Active	
Alpha Sigma Chi	ΑΣΧ	December 9, 2008 – 20xx ?	University of Ontario Institute of Technology	Social	Local	Independent	0	Inactive	
Beta Delta Pi	ΒΔΠ		Bucknell Female Institute	Social	International		0	Inactive	
Ceres	Ceres	October 12, 1985	Colorado State University	Social and agriculture	International		1	Active	
Chi Sigma Xi	ΧΣΞ	April 1, 2010	University of Toronto Scarborough	Multicultural	Local	Independent	1	Active	
Delta Alpha Theta	ΔΑΘ	October 5, 2005	University of Windsor	Social	National		3	Active	
Delta Delta Delta	ΔΔΔ	November 27, 1888	Boston University	Social	International	NPC	2	Active	
Delta Eta Iota	ΔΗΙ	January 10, 2008	University of Lethbridge	Social	Local	Independent	1	Active	
Delta Gamma	ΔΓ	December 25, 1873	Lewis School for Girls	Social	International	NPC	2	Active	
Delta Phi Epsilon	ΔΦΕ	March 17, 1917	New York University Law School	Social	International	NPC	3	Active	
Delta Phi Nu	ΔΦΝ	May 14, 2008	Fleming College	Social	Regional	Independent	4	Active	
Delta Pi	ΔΠ	November 2, 1989	York University	Jewish and social	Regional		3	Active	
Delta Psi Delta	ΔΨΔ	September 15, 1991	Carleton University	Social	Regional		4	Active	
Delta Sigma Theta	ΔΣΘ	January 13, 1913	Howard University	Predominantly Black, Service	International	NPHC	1	Active	
Delta Zeta	ΔΖ	October 24, 1902	Miami University	Social	International	NPC	1	Active	
Gamma Delta Nu	ΓΔΝ	April 10, 2016	York University	Social	Local	Independent	1	Active	
Gamma Phi Beta	ΓΦΒ	November 11, 1874	Syracuse University	Social	International	NPC	3	Active	
Iota Beta Chi	ΙΒΧ	January 6, 1997	Dalhousie University	Social	National	Independent	2	Active	
Kappa Alpha Theta	ΚΑΘ	January 27, 1870	DePauw University	Social	International	NPC	4	Active	
Kappa Beta Gamma	ΚΒГ	January 22, 1917	Marquette University	Social	International	Independent	13	Active	
Kappa Kappa Gamma	ΚΚΓ	October 13, 1870	Monmouth College	Social	International	NPC	4	Active	
Kappa Phi Xi	ΚΦΞ	September 4, 2018	York University	Social	Local	Independent	1	Active	
Kappa Sigma Psi	ΚΣΨ	January 30, 2016	University of Ontario, Institute of Technology	Social	Regional		2	Active	
Nu Delta Mu	ΝΔΜ	April 27, 2011	Université de Montréal	Social	International	Independent	1	Active	
Nu Omega Zeta	ΝΩΖ	September 7, 2011	McMaster University	Black-focused and social	Local	Independent	0	Inactive	
Nu Sigma Pi	ΝΣΠ	September 14, 1997	University of Ottawa	Social	Local	Independent	1	Active	
Omega Phi Sigma	ΩΦΣ	November 18, 2010	University of Ottawa	Social	Local	Independent	0	Inactive	
Omega Pi	ΩΠ	April 20, 1985	Dalhousie University, Saint Mary's University, Mount Saint Vincent University, Nova Scotia Community College, University Sainte-Anne, Nova Scotia College of Art and Design, University of King's College	Social	Regional	Independent	1	Active	
Omega Sigma Chi	ΩΣΧ	April 12, 2010	Brock University	Social	Local	Independent	1	Active	
Phi Sigma Sigma	ΦΣΣ	November 26, 1913	Hunter College	Social	International	NPC	0	Inactive	
Pi Alpha Gamma	ΠΑΓ	October 18, 2011	St Thomas University	Social	Local	Independent	0	Inactive	
Pi Beta Phi	ΠΒΦ	April 28, 1867	Monmouth College	Social	International	NPC	4	Active	
Pi Nu Epsilon	ΠΝΕ	November 1914	State University of New York at Canton	Social	International	Independent	0	Inactive	
Sigma Beta Phi	ΣΒΦ	February 29, 2008	University of Ottawa	Black and Social	Local	Independent	1	Active	
Sigma Gamma Rho	ΣΓΡ	November 12, 1922	Butler University	African-American	International	NPHC	1	Active	
Sigma Lambda Gamma	ΣΛΓ	March 15, 2004	University of Waterloo	Social	Local	Independent	1	Active	
Sigma Psi Alpha	ΣΨΑ	September 11, 2009	University of Ottawa	Social	Local	Independent	0	Inactive	
Tau Lambda Xi	ΤΛΞ	November 13, 2017	Dalhousie University, Saint Mary's University, Mount Saint Vincent University, Nova Scotia Community College, and Nova Scotia College of Art and Design	Social	Local	Independent	1	Active	
Tau Sigma Phi	ΤΣΦ	September 9, 2007	Carleton University	Social	National	Independent	5	Active	
Theta Sigma Psi	ΘΣΨ	November 6, 2011	University of Ottawa	Social	Local	Independent	1	Active	
Xi Delta Theta	ΞΔΘ	January 22, 1993	Carleton University	Social	Local	Independent	1	Active	
Zeta Beta Omega	ΖΒΩ	December 3, 2018	University of Toronto	Jewish	Local	Independent	1	Active	
Zeta Beta Psi	ΖΒΨ	April 15, 2009	Thompson Rivers University	Social	Local	Independent	0	Inactive	
Zeta Lambda Zeta	ΖΛΖ	February 17, 2010	Université de Montréal	Social	International	Independent	2	Active	
Zeta Tau Omega	ΖΤΩ	November 28, 1967	Concordia University	Social	Local	Independent	1	Active	
Zeta Theta Xi	ΖΘΞ	September 14, 2010	University of Ottawa	Social	Local	Independent	1	Active	

== See also ==
- Fraternities and sororities
- List of social fraternities
- List of social sororities and women's fraternities
- Service fraternities and sororities
- Fraternities and sororities at Dalhousie University
- Fraternities in France
- Fraternities and sororities at York University
- Greek life at University of Toronto
- University of Alberta fraternities and sororities
