= University of Alberta fraternities and sororities =

The University of Alberta is a public institution that was formed in 1908 in Edmonton, Alberta, Canada. At the university, fraternities are governed by a local Interfraternity Council and the sororities are governed by the National Panhellenic Council. All existing chapters formed after 1929 when a twenty-year ban of fraternities and sororities was lifted.

In 1909, Henry Marshall Tory, the first president of the university, ordered all secret societies to disband, including the local secret societies Upsilon Upsilon and Pi Sigma Phi. The push to remove the ban began in 1927, when students formed a committee called the Athenian Club to lobby for fraternities. That same year, several men had formed the Rocky Mountain Goat Club, which was only sanctioned due to its lack of any secret rituals or a written constitution.

The University of Alberta's ban on fraternities and sororities ended in 1929, following the departure of President Tory. Members of the Rocky Mountain Goat Club formed one of the university's newest fraternities, Delta Nu (later merged into Phi Kappa Pi).

Phi Delta Theta was the first chapter of a national or international fraternity on campus, officially recognized and chartered on September 12, 1930. Also, in 1930, the Athenian Club became a chapter of Zeta Psi. The first national sorority chapter was Delta Gamma, established in May 9, 1931 from the local sorority Phi Gamma. All fraternities and sororities at the university occupy houses.

Delta Kappa Epsilon was the third international fraternity on campus, officially recognized and chartered on December 30, 1932 as the Delta Phi Chapter, with members originating from a local fraternity called Phi Alpha formed in 1929.

As of 2025, the University of Alberta made the decision to end its rental agreement with on campus organizations. Organizations were given notice of this decision in April 2025, and for most organizations, their final lease will end on August 31, 2026. Organizations with on campus housing that were impacted by this decision include Alpha Gamma Delta Sorority, Alpha Psi Sorority, Delta Chi Fraternity, KORE Women’s Fraternity, Pi Beta Phi Women’s Fraternity, Pi Kappa Alpha Fraternity, and Zeta Psi Fraternity. The University of Alberta stated that "maintaining these older homes to a standard that meets the modern needs of today's students is not sustainable, given increasing costs and inflationary pressures."

== Fraternities ==
Following are the fraternity chapters at the University of Alberta.

Organization	Symbols	Chapter name	Charter date and range	Organization's scope	Status	Ref.
Delta Chi	ΔΧ	Alberta	April 5, 1997	North America	Active	
Delta Kappa Epsilon	ΔΚΕ	Delta Phi	December 30, 1932	North America	Active	(Note: Chapter formed from Phi Alpha (local), established in 1929.) (Note: In January 2011, the university suspended the Delta Kappa Epsilon chapter for five years for a hazing incident that took place in October 2010. The university reinstated the chapter in August 2013.)
Delta Sigma Phi	ΔΣΦ	Epsilon Alpha	1965–1971	North America	Inactive	(Note: Chapter formed from Sigma Alpha Tau (local), established in 1961.)
Delta Upsilon	ΔΥ	Alberta	January 19, 1935	North America	Active	(Note: Chapter formed from Pi Epsilon (local), established in 1923.)
Farmhouse	FH	Alberta	April 20, 1974	North America	Active	(Note: Chapter formed from the Agricultural Club (local), established in 1969.)
Kappa Alpha Society	ΚΑ	Alberta Alpha	November 5, 1988–2011	North America	Inactive	
Kappa Sigma	ΚΣ	Epsilon-Alpha	May 1, 1939 – 2024	North America	Inactive	
Lambda Chi Alpha	ΛΧΑ	Epsilon-Rho	1945	North America	Active	(Note: Chapter formed from Alpha Chi (local), established in 1940.)
Phi Delta Theta	ΦΔΘ	Alberta Alpha	September 12, 1930	North America	Active	(Note: Chapter formed from Alpha Rho Tau (local), established in 1929.)
Phi Gamma Delta	ΦΓΔ and FIJI	Epsilon Alpha	October 24, 1970	North America	Active	
Pi Kappa Alpha	ΠΚΑ	Lambda Epsilon	November 11, 2001	North America	Active	
Phi Kappa Pi	ΦΚΠ	Delta Mu	1930–1975, 19xx ?– 1995	National	Inactive	(Note: Chapter formed from Delta Mu, established in 1929 by members of the Rocky Mountain Goat Club.)
Sigma Alpha Mu	ΣΑΜ	Mu Beta	March 30, 1941 – 1972	North America	Inactive	(Note: Chapter formed from Zeta Alpha Upsilon (local), established in 1935.)
Theta Chi	ΘΧ	Zeta Gamma	February 20, 1965	North America	Active	
Zeta Psi	ΖΨ	Mu Theta	1930	International	Inactive	(Note: This chapter formed from the Athenian Club (local), established in 1926.)

== Sororities and women's fraternities ==
Following are the sorority chapters at the University of Alberta.

Organization	Symbols	Chapter name	Charter date and range	Organization's scope	Status	Ref.
Alpha Gamma Delta	ΑΓΔ	Delta Kappa	February 29, 1964 – 1977; 1996	North America	Active	
Alpha Psi	ΑΨ		2004	Local	Active	(Note: This sorority is gender and sexuality inclusive, according to its social media pages.)
Ceres		Beta	February 15, 1986 – 19xx ?; March 2007 – 2023	North America	Inactive	(Note: Chapter formed from FarmHouse Little Sisters. The chapter formed Kore when the national sorority went defunct.)
Delta Delta Delta	ΔΔΔ	Canada Gamma	February 6, 1932 – January 1, 1959	North America	Inactive	(Note: Chapter formed from Nu Lambda (local), established in 1929.)
Delta Gamma	ΔΓ	Beta Beta	May 9, 1931	North America	Active	(Note: Chapter formed from Phi Gamma (local), established in 1929.)
Kappa Alpha Theta	ΚΑΘ	Beta Chi	September 26, 1931	North America	Active	(Note: Chapter formed from Psi Omega (local), established in 1929.)
Kore			2023	Local	Active	(Note: Formed from the Beta chapter of Ceres, a women's agricultural fraternity that went defunct in 2024. It maintains its agricultural purpose and is still a women's fraternity.)
Pi Beta Phi	ΠΒΦ	Alberta Alpha	September 22, 1931	North America	Active	(Note: This chapter formed from Alpha Upsilon (local), established in 1928.)

== See also ==
- Fraternities and sororities in Canada
