= Sigma Gamma Epsilon =

American earth sciences honor society

- ΣΓΕ
- Founded: March 30, 1915; 111 years ago University of Kansas
- Type: Honor
- Affiliation: Geological Society of America
- Status: Active
- Emphasis: Earth and Geosciences
- Scope: National
- Motto: Synodoí sti Geologikí Érevna "Companions in geological research"
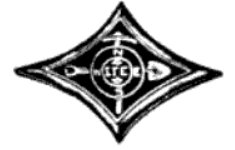
- Member badge
- Colors: Gold, Blue, and Silver
- Symbol: Rock Hammer, Shovel, and Compass
- Publication: The Compass
- Chapters: 215
- Headquarters: P.O. Box 324; Cedar Falls, Iowa 50613; United States
- Website: www.sgeearth.org

The Society of Sigma Gamma Epsilon (ΣΓΕ) is a national honor society to recognize scholarship in the earth sciences founded in 1915 at the University of Kansas. It has chartered more than 200 chapters at colleges and universities across the United States.

== History ==
Sigma Gamma Epsilon was founded on March 30, 1915, at the University of Kansas. The society was established as an honor society to recognize scholarship and professionalism in the earth sciences. It has for its objectives the scholastic, scientific, and professional advancement of its members and the extension of relations of friendship and assistance among colleges and universities which are devoted to the advancement of the earth sciences.

Sigma Gamma Epsilon is associated with the Geological Society of America. Its headquarters are located in Cedar Falls, Iowa.

== Symbols ==
The colors of Sigma Gamma Epsilon are gold, blue, and silver. Its symbols are the rock hammer, shovel, and compass. Its motto is Synodoí sti Geologikí Érevna or "Companions in geological research". Its publication is The Compass.

== Governance ==
Government of the Society is by student members and the ultimate legislative authority is vested in a National Convention held every two years. It is composed of one student delegate from each chapter and the seven national officers who are faculty members.

== Chapters ==
Nearly 200 chapters throughout the United States have been installed since 1915.

== Notable members ==
- Warren L. Carpenter, flight surgeon and physician
- Larry L. Hench, emeritus professor at the University of Florida and chair of the Ceramic Materials Department at Imperial College London; inventor of Bioglass 45S5
- Henry H. Krusekopf, soil scientist and academic
- Helen Niña Tappan Loeblich, micropaleontologist who was a professor of geology at the University of California, Los Angeles
- Hugh Miser, geologist who had a long and distinguished career with the United States Geological Survey
- Sally Kuhn Sennert, volcanologist with the United States Geological Survey
- William H. Shideler, founder and longtime chair of the Department of geology at Miami University.
