= Warren L. Carpenter =

Flight surgeon and physician

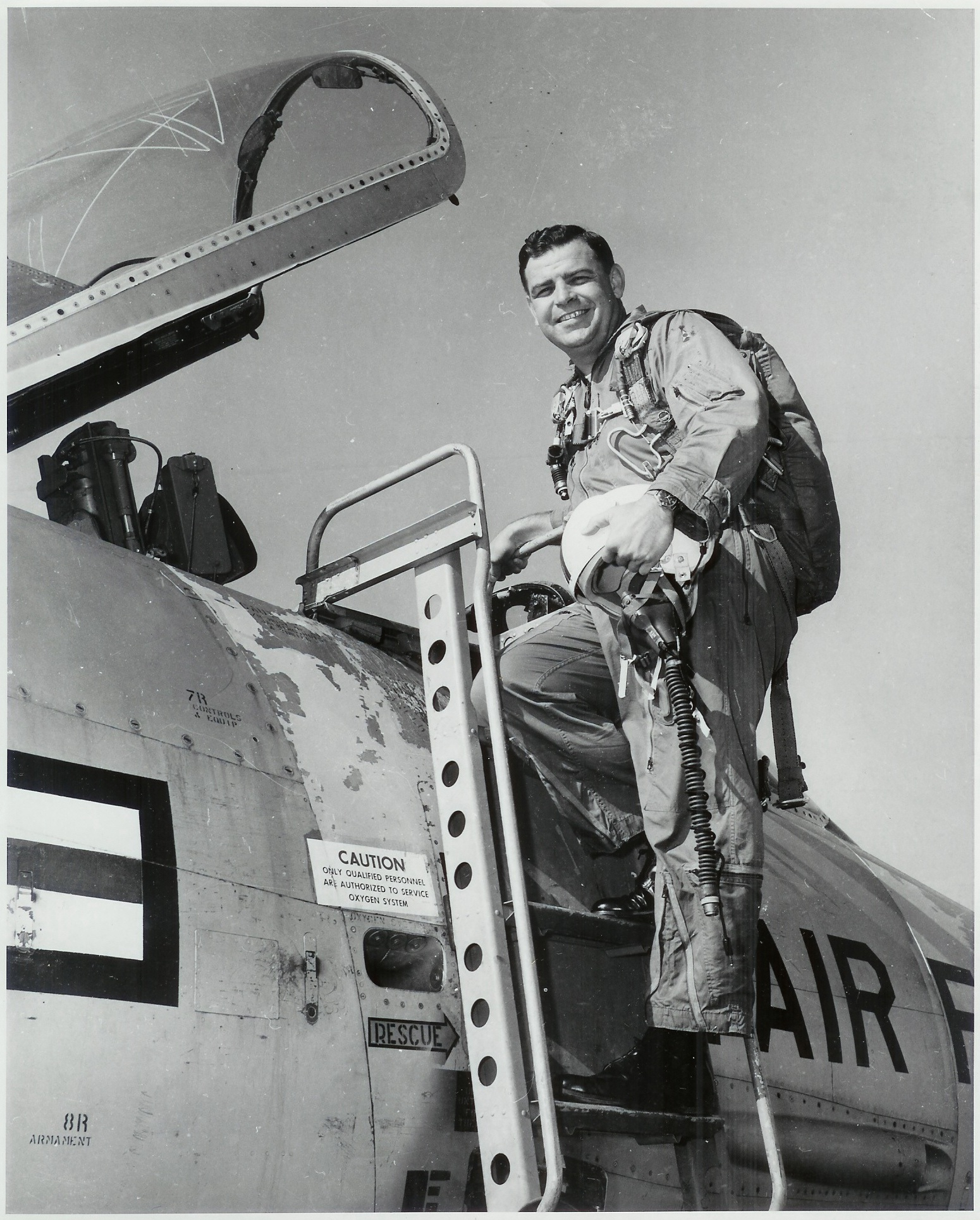
- Warren L. Carpenter, Flight Surgeon, ca. 1967
- Born: August 31, 1931; Little Rock, Arkansas, U.S.
- Died: July 7, 2003 (aged 71); Colorado Springs, Colorado, U.S.
- Military career
- Allegiance: United States
- Branch: United States Marine Corps, 1949-1952; United States Air Force, 1966-1997
- Rank: Colonel (United States)
- Nickname: "Doc"
- Commands: Command Surgeon, Alaskan Air Command; Commander, USAF Hospital, Elmendorf AFB; Vice-Commander of the USAF School of Aerospace Medicine; Command Surgeon of United States Space Command; Command Surgeon of Air Force Space Command; Command Surgeon of North American Aerospace Defense Command

Warren L. Carpenter (August 12, 1931 in Little Rock, Arkansas – July 7, 2003 in Colorado Springs, Colorado) was a veteran of the United States Marine Corps and the Air Force, including serving as the Department of Defense's Chief Medical Officer for military space shuttle missions, flying 297 combat hours, serving as one of six Residents in Aerospace Medicine selected to fly on medical evacuation aircraft to bring home the U.S. prisoners-of-war from North Viet Nam on the final repatriation leg of Operation Homecoming, and earning six Service awards for marksmanship.

== Personal ==
"Doc" Carpenter, son of Harry and Abby, married Margaret Ann Gray, and was the father of three daughters. He was a descendant of William Carpenter (born c1730-1750 - died c1803) of Brunswick County, Virginia.

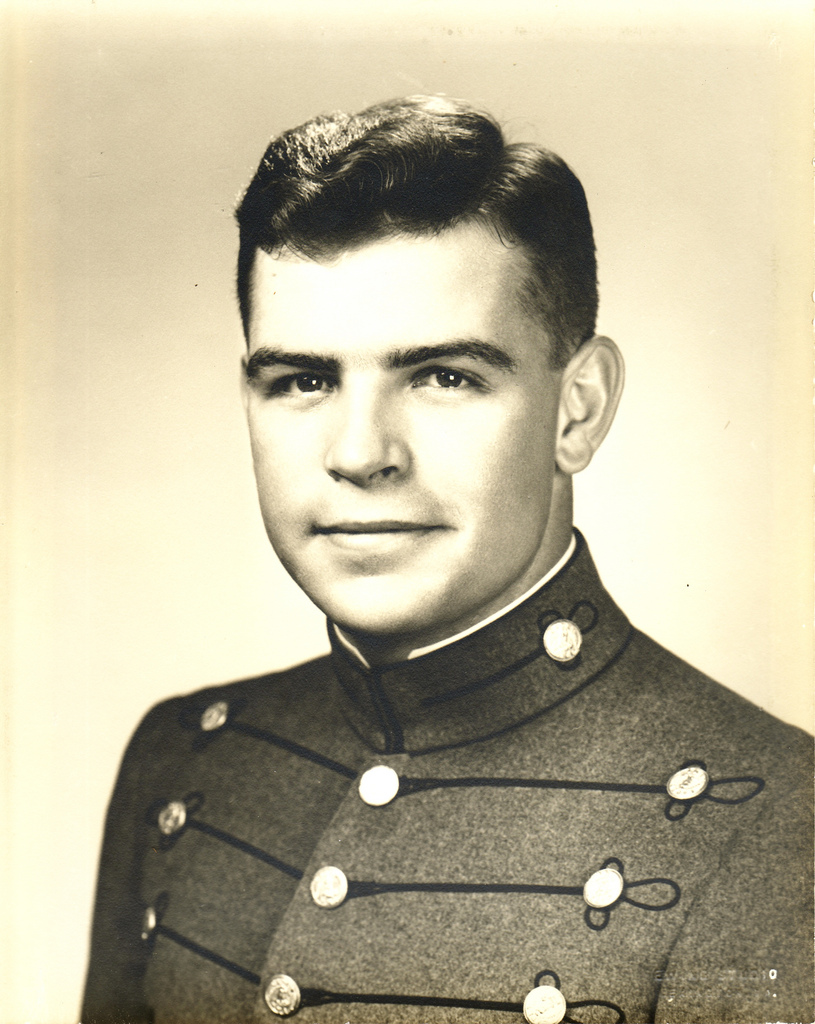
Cadet Warren L. Carpenter, Virginia Military Institute, ca. 1951

== Education ==
Carpenter attended Virginia Military Institute from 1950–1952 and briefly in 1953, with an interruption in his education to serve an active duty tour in the U.S. Marine Corps during the Korean War. In January 1953, he transferred to the University of Arkansas to earn a Bachelor of Science degree in Geology. While a student, he was Arkansas State Skeet and Trap Champion and shot on the Arkansas Rifle Team, and he earned a private pilot's license. After graduation, he worked as a geologist with a major oil company from 1956 to 1960, then returned to school to study medicine at the University of Arkansas for Medical Sciences. In 1965, he received his Doctor of Medicine degree at the University of Arkansas for Medical Sciences and interned at St. Vincent's Infirmary, then entered private practice in Little Rock. He completed a Masters in Public Health from Tulane University School of Public Health and Tropical Medicine in 1972 in conjunction with his residency in Aerospace Medicine at the USAF School of Aerospace Medicine at Brooks Air Force Base, Texas. His military training also included Air War College (Class of 1977), Industrial College of the Armed Forces, Interagency Institute for Federal Health Care Executives, and Advanced Training in Health Care Administration.

== Military service ==
Carpenter began his military career by enlisting in the Marine Corps Reserves in 1949. He was called to active duty in October 1950 and attained the rank of sergeant before completing his enlistment in April 1952.

In 1966, he joined the Arkansas Air National Guard, and was commissioned a first lieutenant in June. In 1967, he entered active duty as a captain in the Air Force. During the Vietnam War, Dr. Carpenter served as Chief of Aeromedical Services at the 11th USAF Hospital, U-Tapao Royal Thai Air Force Base in Thailand from August 1968-August 1969. In 1973, he was one of five Residents in Aerospace Medicine selected to fly on medical evacuation aircraft to bring home the U.S. prisoners-of-war from North Viet Nam on the final repatriation leg of Operation Homecoming. Upon completion of the Resident in Aerospace Medicine program, Dr. Carpenter was assigned to Elmendorf Air Force Base, Alaska, where he served as Command Surgeon, Alaskan Air Command and Commander, USAF Hospital Elmendorf. In 1983, he was appointed Vice-Commander of the USAF School of Aerospace Medicine.

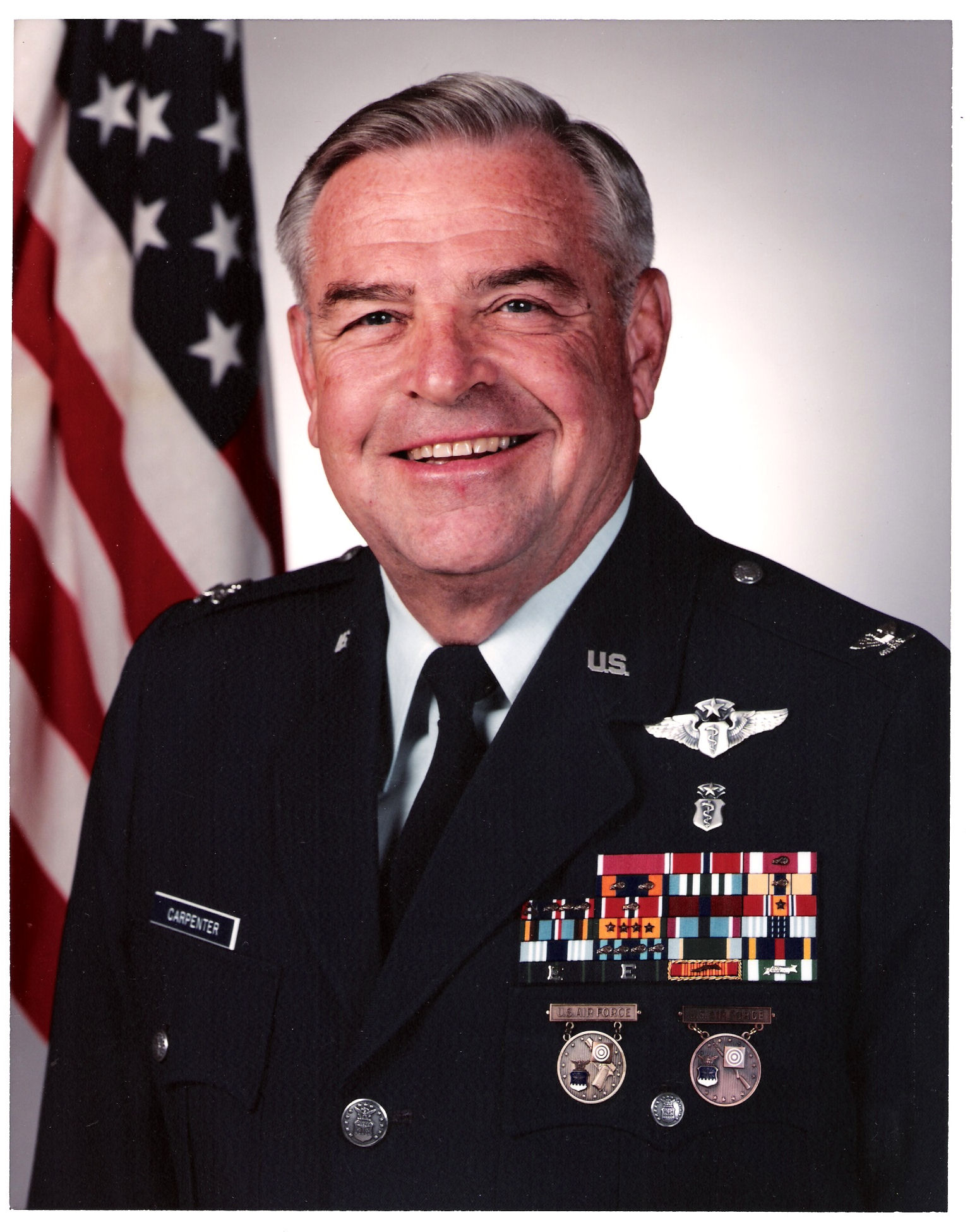
Col. Warren L. Carpenter official photo, Space Command, 1991

Dr. Carpenter was promoted to Command Surgeon of United States Space Command, Air Force Space Command, and North American Aerospace Defense Command In 1985. As senior medical member of the Air Force astronaut selection board, he was responsible for the early designs of the modern space suit and the F-16 cockpit. Carpenter's last assignment was as Director of the Department of Defense Medical Examination Review Board, at the USAF Academy. He retired on June 17, 1997 in the rank of colonel as a Chief Flight Surgeon with 31 years of service and more than 3,200 flying hours.

== Honors ==
Colonel (Dr.) Carpenter's military decorations include two Defense Superior Service Medals, the Legion of Merit, the Bronze Star, Defense Meritorious Service Medal, two Meritorious Service Medals, three Air Medals, the Joint Service Commendation Medal, two Air Force Commendation Medals, two U.S. Navy Marksmanship Medals, two U.S. Air Force Small Arms Expert Marksmanship Ribbons, and two U.S. Air Force Marksmanship Badges. Dr. Carpenter was a Life Member of the Air War College, a Patron Member of the National Rifle Association of America, a Distinguished Alumnus of the University of Arkansas School of Medical Sciences, a Life Member of Disabled American Veterans, a Past National Chairman of the Medical Explorer Scouts of the Boy Scouts of America, and a member of the American Medical Association, Arkansas State Medical Board, Association of Military Surgeons of the United States, Society of USAF Flight Surgeons, Aerospace Medical Association, Sigma Alpha Epsilon fraternity, University of Arkansas Alumni Association, Sigma Gamma Epsilon Geological Honor Society, Alpha Omega Alpha Medical Honor Society, and the Colorado State Shooting Association.

=== Medals received ===
- Defense Superior Service Medal w/ 1 OLC
- Legion of Merit Medal
- Bronze Star Medal
- Defense Meritorious Service Medal
- Meritorious Service Medal w/1 OLC
- Air Medal w/2 OLCs
- Joint Service Commendation Medal
- Air Force Commendation Medal w/1 OLC
- Joint Meritorious Unit Award
- Air Force Outstanding Unit Award w/3 OLCs, 1 V Device
- Air Force Organizational Excellence Award w/4 OLCs
- USMC Good Conduct Medal
- National Defense Service Medal w/2 Service Stars
- Armed Forces Expeditionary Medal
- Vietnam Service Medal w/4 Campaign Devices
- Southwest Asia Service Medal w/1 Campaign Device
- Humanitarian Service Medal
- Air Force Overseas Short Tour Service Ribbon
- Air Force Overseas Long Tour Service Ribbon
- Air Force Longevity Service Ribbon w/6 OLCs
- Air Force Small Arms Expert Marksmanship Ribbon w/1 Device
- Air Force Training Ribbon
- Navy Expert Rifleman Medal
- Navy Expert Pistol Shot Medal
- Vietnam Gallantry Cross w/Palm
- Vietnam Campaign Medal
