= Sally Kuhn Sennert =

American volcanologist

Sally Susan Kuhn Sennert
- Education: University of Pittsburgh
- Scientific career
- Fields: Volcanology
- Workplaces: GeoEye, Inc.; Smithsonian's Global Volcanism Project; National Museum of Natural History; US Geological Survey's Volcano Hazard Program
- Academic advisors: Mike Ramsey

Sally Kuhn Sennert is a volcanologist at the U.S. Geological Survey's Volcano Hazard Program and Smithsonian's Global Volcanism Program at the Department of Mineral Sciences in the National Museum of Natural History. She is a main writer the Weekly Volcanic Activity Report which is a report of notices of volcanic activity around the world, and she is an assistant editor and writer for the monthly Bulletin of the Global Volcanism Network.

== Life and career ==
Sennert graduated from the University of Pittsburgh in 1997 with a BA in Anthropology and in 2003 with an M.Sc in Geology and Planetary Science her advisor was Mike Ramsey. She worked as a research assistant (1993–1996, 1999–2001) and laboratory manager (1997–1998) at the University of Pittsburgh Medical Center/ Oregon Regional Primate Research Center and then at the Department of Geology and Planetary Science as a graduate research and instructor from 2001 to 2004. She became a geospatial analyst for GeoEye from 2004 to 2006. She was then appointed as a Science Writer, Editor, and Volcanologist at the Smithsonian's National Museum of Natural History in the Department of Mineral Sciences and the US Geological Survey's Global Volcanism Program. She writes the US Geological Survey's Weekly Volcanic Activity Report and helps write and edit the Bulletin of the Global Volcanism Network. The weekly volcanic activity report notes the non-routine activity of Earth's volcanoes.

Sennert has been a member of the Sigma Gamma Epsilon honor society (2000–2003) for the Earth Sciences, the Geological Society of America since 2002, the American Geophysical Union (2002–2004), the Pittsburgh Geological Society (2004), and the Geological Association of Canada (2004).

== Awards and honors ==
Among other things, Sennert is an invited speaker and recipient of an award from the Allegheny-Ohio Section of the American Association of Engineering Geologists, the Geotechnical Group of the Pittsburgh Section of the American Society of Civil Engineers, and the Pittsburgh Geological Society in April 2004. She was also invited to speak to a Girl Scout troop and group of homeschoolers in January 2006.

== Select publications ==
- Kuhn Sennert, S.S., Venzke, E., Siebert, L., Kimberly, P., New Advances in the Collaborative USGS/Smithsonian Weekly Volcanic Activity Reports: Documenting Current Activity for Scientists and Non-scientists, 6th Biennial Workshop on Japan-Kamchatka-Alaska Subduction Processes (JKASP-2009), Sci. Abst. & Progs., p. 295, 2009.
- Kuhn, S. S., Ramsey, M. S., Growth of the Soufrière Hills Dome: Fusion of Thermal Infrared Spaceborne Data with a Multi-parameter Database. Cities on Volcanoes III Conference, July 2003, Hilo, Hawai’i.
- Kuhn, S. S., Ramsey, M. S., Monitoring the Surface Changes and Growth of the Soufrière Hills Lava Dome: Thermal Infrared Analyses of Field and Spaceborne Data. EOS Trans. AGU, 83(47), Fall Meet. Suppl., Abstract V12-1407, 2002.
