= Russell McConnell =

Canadian athlete and soldier

Russ McConnell
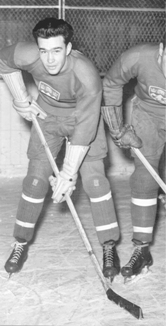
- Born: January 7, 1918; Montreal, Quebec, Canada
- Died: September 7, 1942 (aged 24); HMCS Raccoon, Gulf of St. Lawrence
- Position: Right wing
- Shot: Left
- Played for: Montreal Royals, McGill Redmen
- Playing career: 1935–1942

Russell Henry McConnell (January 7, 1918 – September 7, 1942) was a Canadian athlete and soldier. He was a record-setting and champion athlete in ice hockey and Canadian football. McConnell is one of the most accomplished hockey players in McGill University history, being a member of four championship teams including one in which he was captain. After graduation, McConnell served in the Royal Canadian Navy and died during patrols in the Gulf of St. Lawrence.

== Biography ==
Russell McConnell was born in Montreal, Quebec. He studied commerce at McGill University from 1935 to 1939. He was part of the Phi Kappa Pi fraternity, and to this day is one of their most celebrated Brothers. McConnell was a member of three McGill Queen's Cup and Alex Thompson Trophy (International Intercollegiate Hockey League title) championships in hockey and played two seasons of senior football. McConnell won two scoring titles in the International Intercollegiate Hockey League and was the Ken Stewart Cup most valuable player in the Quebec Senior Hockey League during the 1938-1939 season. That season, he was appointed captain of the hockey team. During his years with the McGill Redmen he established career records for goals, assists, and points, which lasted fifty years - 116 goals with 95 assists for 211 points in 94 games. His most impressive achievement occurred in February 1939 when he set a record for most points (10) in a game, accomplishing this feat twice during a five-day period against Harvard University and the University of Montreal.

After graduation, McConnell turned down an offer of a professional hockey career with the New York Rangers. Instead, he enrolled in the Royal Canadian Navy Volunteer Reserve. McConnell continued to play ice hockey with the Montreal Royals, which made the Allan Cup finals in 1941. On September 7, 1942, McConnell was a member of the crew of HMCS Raccoon when the armed yacht attempted to chase down the German submarine U-165 in the Gulf of St. Lawrence and contact with Raccoon was lost. On October 9, 1942, McConnell's remains, identified by a school ring, washed up on Anticosti Island. His remains were committed to the sea with full naval honours. McConnell's name is located on panel 8 of the Halifax Memorial.

== Awards ==
McConnell was an inaugural inductee to the McGill Sports Hall of Fame in 1996. McConnell was awarded the Ken Stewart Cup as most valuable player in the Quebec Senior Hockey League.

== Bibliography ==
- "Canadian War Dead from the Sporting World" (PDF). Commonwealth War Graves Commission Canadian Agency.
- "View Inductees: Russ McConnell". McGill University.
- Ferguson, Bob (2005). Who's Who In Canadian Sport. Fitzhenry and Whiteside. ISBN 1-55041-855-6.
