= List of Dalhousie University fraternities and sororities =

The fraternities and sororities of Dalhousie University are well established and active in the Halifax community. Dalhousie previously had a policy against recognizing organizations that used gender identity as part of their membership criteria. However, this policy has since been changed, and Greek Organizations can now be recognized in an official capacity. To date, one organization has completed the ratification process and is officially recognized as a student society at Dalhousie. This organization is Tau Lambda Xi sorority.

Many of the international organizations have considered completing the ratification process but have not done so due to the agreement that once ratified, the DSU constitution will supersede their own.

Before this policy change, many fraternities and sororities collectively formed the Greek Council, and as a result of its multi-gendered standing, was able to become a ratified society under the Dalhousie Student Union. The Greek Council became obsolete due to the policy change. The following is a list of Dalhousie University fraternities and sororities:

Organization (chapter)	Chapter founding	Type	Scope	Ratified society	Status	Dal	SMU	MSVU	NSCC	Notes
Tau Lambda Xi (Alpha)	2017	Sorority	Local	Yes	Active	Yes	Yes	Yes	Yes	
Iota Beta Chi (Alpha)	1997	Sorority	Local	No	Inactive	Yes	Yes	Yes	Yes	
Phi Delta Theta (Nova Scotia Alpha)	1930	Fraternity	International	No	Active	Yes	No	No	No	
Sigma Chi (Gamma Rho)	1933	Fraternity	International	No	Active	Yes	Yes	No	No	
Alpha Gamma Delta (Alpha Eta)	1932	Women's fraternity	International	No	Active	Yes	Yes	Yes	No	
Omega Pi (Alpha)	1985	Sorority	Local	No	Active	Yes	Yes	Yes	Yes	
Phi Kappa Pi (Zeta Gamma)	1923	Fraternity	National	No	Active	Yes	Yes	Yes	No	
Alpha Epsilon Pi (Alpha Gamma)	2013	Fraternity	International	No	Active	Yes	Yes	Yes	No	
Zeta Psi (Alpha Mu)	1938	Fraternity	International	No	Active	Yes	Yes	No	No	
Mu Omicron Zeta (Beta)	2015	Fraternity	National	No	Active	Yes	Yes	Yes	Yes	
Kappa Alpha Society (Nova Scotia Alpha)	2009	Literary society	International	No	Inactive	Yes	No	No	No	
Phi Chi (Nu Sigma)	1928	Medical fraternity	International	No	Inactive	Yes	No	No	No	

== See also ==
- Dalhousie University
- Dalhousie Student Union
- Fraternities and sororities
