= Episkopon =

Secret society at Trinity College, Canada

- ΕΠΙΣΚΟΠΩΝ
- Founded: 1858; 168 years ago Trinity College
- Type: Secret
- Affiliation: Independent
- Status: Defunct
- Defunct date: 2020
- Scope: Local
- Motto: Notandi Sunt Tibi Mores "The manners of men are to be carefully observed"
- Chapters: 1
- Headquarters: Toronto, Ontario; Canada

Episkopon (Greek: ΕΠΙΣΚΟΠΩΝ, "bishop") was a secret society at Trinity College in the University of Toronto. Its male branch formed in 1858, followed by the female branch in 1899. It was the oldest collegiate secret society in Canada.

In 1992, Episkopon was censured and disassociated from the Trinity College Council following allegations of racism and homophobia. The female branch announced its closure in June 2020. The male branch is presumed to also be defunct.

== History ==
Episkopon was founded in 1858 at what was then University of Trinity College (later Trinity College in the federated University of Toronto) as a satirical student newspaper. The group secret society selected a leader or Scribe who would read the newspaper out loud. This became an end-of-year campus tradition and any student was allowed to submit items to be read.

This evolved into three formal "Readings" each year, held in September, on Halloween, and in the spring. The Readings were performed in Latin and English, that included the recitation of satirical songs, poems, and jokes, along with reading from its newspaper. Readings poked fun or chastised other students. The National Archives of Canada owns poster by artist Roloff Beny advertising a 1945 Reading.

One attempted student suicide was allegedly linked to a 1985 Reading, although the circumstances of the connection were not reported, and were later refuted by a CBC radio investigation. In October 1991, following accusations of racism, sexism, and homophobia in Episkopon, a task force was formed to investigate it, and Trinity College at large. For instance, a female Trinity student of Sri Lankan descent was dressed in rags and led about the college on her knees with a sign around her neck reading "Token ethnic." In approximately 1989, Episkopon initiation ceremonies required candidates to fantasize out loud about how they would rape new "women of college" if the opportunity presented itself, and were then pressured to simulate fellatio on a dildo while others jeered at them for being "fags."

When the male Scribe of the 1992-1993 academic year refused to draft a constitution that was consistent with the task force's recommendations, the Trinity College Council voted unanimously to sever all ties with the organization.

Investigative journalist Declan Hill, a Trinity alumnus, in a 1993 documentary broadcast on the CBC Radio program Ideas, claimed that Episkopon's Readings tended to ridicule certain groups and actions as a form of social control. The article cited student objections to the singling out of individuals for public shaming. In 2008, a prospective male member of Episkopon sustained head injuries when he tripped and fell down a hill during an initiation ritual.

Despite policies prohibiting Episkopon from engaging in any activities on college property, the society continued to play an important role in undergraduate life at Trinity as of 1999. In 2010, Trinity College started requiring students to sign its Episkopon Policy, agreeing to not organize, participate, or publicize Episkopon events in association with the college. In 2020, Black students called attention to Episkopon's history of anti-Black racism. Other students and the campus newspaper criticized the society for its racism, sexism, and discrimination practices.

On June 3, 2020, the female branch of Episkopon announced its dissolution, following renewed controversy on social media about its problematic past. Although the male branch is rumoured to have dissolved as well, there has been no public acknowledgment of this.

The Episkopon archives include materials dating to 1879.

== Symbols ==
The name Episkopon is Greek for "Bishop". The society's mythological premise was to deliver "gentle chastisement" on behalf of the Venerable Father (or Mother) Episkopon, a spirit who supposedly resided at Trinity and was represented at readings by a human skull. The motto of the organization is from Horace: Notandi Sunt Tibi Mores (Latin: "The manners of men are to be carefully observed").

Its leaders were called Scribes or Pons. There are two Pons: a Fem-Pon for the female group and a Man-Pon for the male group. When elected, the Pon had to run naked through the campus quad. Described in the media as a "self-perpetuating board of directors", the clandestine group of former Scribes and their assisting editors style themselves as the Order of the Golden Key.

Members wore a key around their neck, with the Scribe wearing a bigger key. At the readings, members wore Trinity robes; in addition, the men wore tuxedos, and the women dressed in black clothing with red lipstick.

== Activities ==
The male and female branches both present three annual Readings during which they publicly satirize the goings-on about the college through a wide range of jokes, songs, and poems delivered by the branch's leader, the Scribe.

== Membership ==
Membership consisted of fifteen women and fifteen men who were students at Trinity College.

== Notable members ==
Prominent alumni of the Episkopon include:

- Adrienne Clarkson, former Canadian Governor General
- Atom Egoyan, filmmaker
- Bill Graham, former Canadian Minister of Foreign Affairs

== See also ==
- Collegiate secret societies in North America
- Fraternities and sororities in Canada
- Secret society
