= Sigma Thêta Pi =

Student fraternity in Canada and France

- ΣΘΠ
- Founded: September 21, 2003; 23 years ago Joseph Fourier University, Grenoble, France
- Type: Social
- Affiliation: Inter Fraternity Council of France
- Status: Active
- Scope: International
- Motto: Fraternitas, Animi Excelsitas ac Dignitas
- Colors: black, red, and white
- Symbol: Radiant Star
- Flower: Fleur-de-lis
- Publication: Sigmagazine
- Chapters: 8
- Nickname: "Sigmas", "STPi" or "EON"
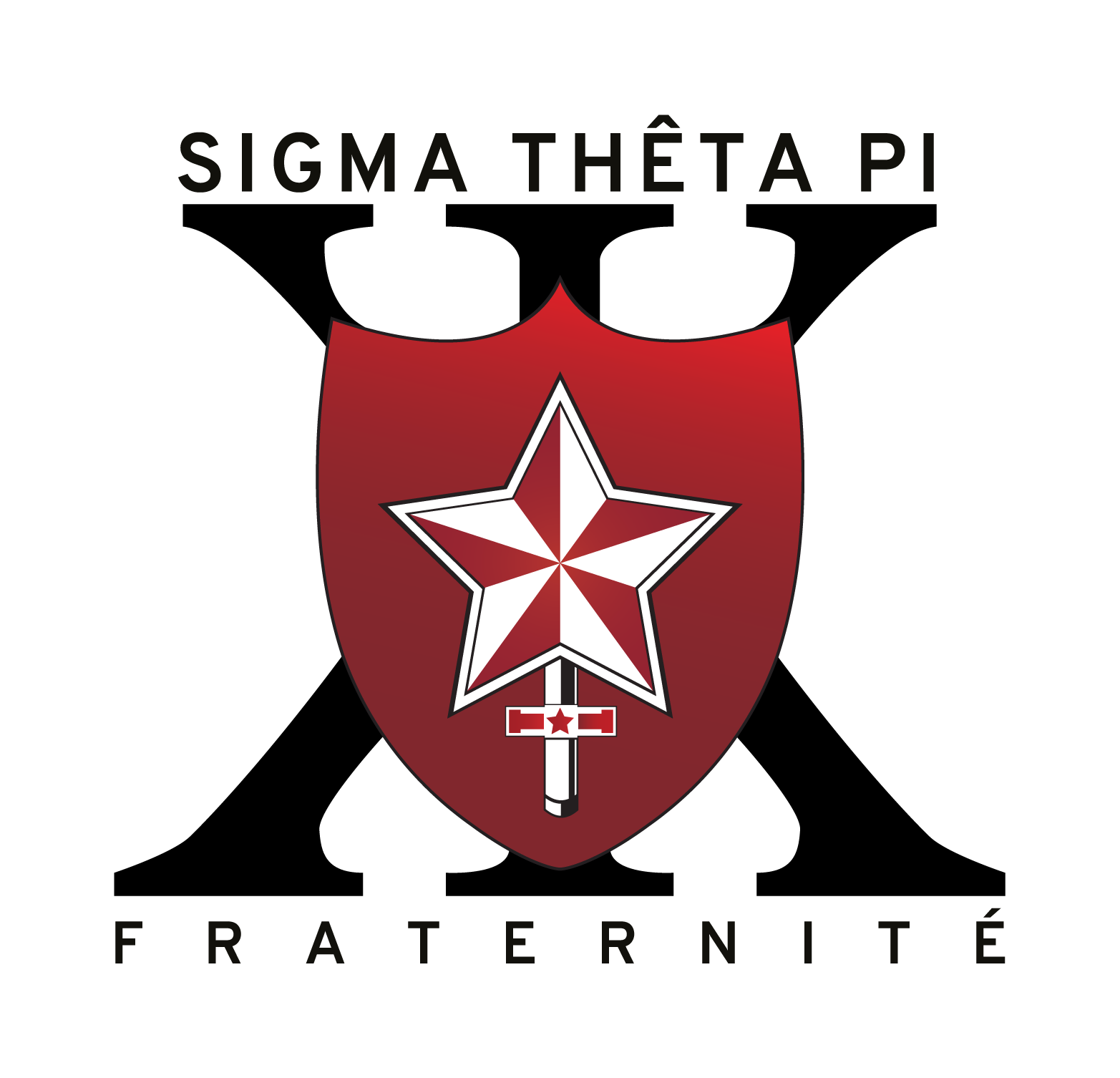
- Logo
- Headquarters: Montreal, Quebec; Canada
- Website: sigmathetapi.org

Sigma Thêta Pi (ΣΘΠ, STPi), is an international francophone student fraternity based in Canada and France. It was established in 2003 at Grenoble Alpes University in Grenoble, France. It is the only French-language-based general collegiate fraternity.

== History ==
Sigma Thêta Pi was founded by four students at Grenoble Alpes University, in Grenoble, France, on September 21, 2003. It is the only French-language-based general collegiate fraternity.

In 2008, the Sigma Thêta Pi established Beta chapter in Montreal, Quebec Canada at the University of Montreal when one of the four founders exported Sigma Thêta Pi to that school. This was followed by Gamma chapter at the University of Lyon in 2008 and the Delta chapter at the University of Picardy Jules Verne in 2009. By 2021, the fraternity had chartered fifteen chapters in Canada and France.

Sigma Thêta Pi includes students from different scholastic curricula, different origins, and nationalities, which can be associated with its international focus. The Beta chapter and the Kappa chapter at the Université Laval are the only Greek letter fraternities to be officially recognized by a French-speaking university in Canada.

Sigma Thêta Pi is a member of the Inter Fraternity Council of France. Its international headquarters is in Montreal.

== Symbols ==
Sigma Thêta Pi's motto is, Fraternitas, Animi Excelsitas ac Dignitas which means "Brotherhood, Pride, Dignity". The fraternity's colors are black, red, and white. Its symbol is the radiant star Its flower is the fleur-de-lis.

The fraternity's publication is Sigmagzine. Its nicknames are Sigmas, STPi, and EON.

== Chapters ==
Chapter list of Sigma Thêta Pi. Active chapters noted in bold, inactive chapters noted in italics.

Greek letter chapter name	Ancient city chapter name	Charter date and range	Institution	Location	Status	Ref.
Alpha	Cularo	September 21, 2003	Grenoble Alpes University	Grenoble, Auvergne-Rhône-Alpes, France	Inactive	(Note: The fraternity's founding schools were the Université Joseph Fourier and Université Pierre Mendès-France, closely related institutions that (re)merged in 2016 into Grenoble Alpes University.)
**Beta**	Hochelaga	2008	Concordia University	Montréal, Quebec, Canada	Active	
**Beta**	Hochelaga	2008	École de technologie supérieure	Montréal, Quebec, Canada	Active	
**Beta**	Hochelaga	2008	HEC Montréal	Montréal, Quebec, Canada	Active	
**Beta**	Hochelaga	2008	McGill University	Montréal, Quebec, Canada	Active	
**Beta**	Hochelaga	2008	Polytechnique Montréal	Montréal, Quebec, Canada	Active	
**Gamma**	Lugdunum	2008–20xx ?, 2018	University of Lyon	Lyon, Auvergne-Rhône-Alpes, France	Active	
**Delta**	Samarobriva	2009	University of Picardy Jules Verne	Amiens, Somme, France	Active	
Epsilon	Burdigala	20xx ?	University of Bordeaux	Bordeaux, Nouvelle-Aquitaine, France	Inactive	
Zêta	Nanciacum	20xx ?	University of Lorraine	Nancy, Grand Est, France	Inactive	
Êta	Divio	2010	University of Burgundy	Dijon, Bourgogne-Franche-Comté, France	Inactive	
Thêta	Avalon	20xx ?	Memorial University of Newfoundland	St. John's, Newfoundland and Labrador, Canada	Inactive	
Iota	Hyatt's Mill	20xx ?	Bishop's University	Sherbrooke, Quebec, Canada	Inactive	
Iota	Hyatt's Mill	20xx ?	Université de Sherbrooke	Sherbrooke, Quebec, Canada	Inactive	
**Kappa**	Stadaconé	2012	Université Laval	Quebec City, Quebec, Canada	Active	
**Lambda**	Lutetia	October 2012	American University of Paris	Paris, Île-de-France, France	Active	
**Lambda**	Lutetia	October 2012	Cergy-Pontoise University	Paris, Île-de-France, France	Active	
**Lambda**	Lutetia	October 2012	Paris-East Créteil University	Paris, Île-de-France, France	Active	
**Lambda**	Lutetia	October 2012	Paris Lumières University Group	Paris, Île-de-France, France	Active	
**Lambda**	Lutetia	October 2012	Paris-Saclay University	Paris, Île-de-France, France	Active	
**Lambda**	Lutetia	October 2012	Paris Sciences et Lettres University	Paris, Île-de-France, France	Active	
**Lambda**	Lutetia	October 2012	Sorbonne Paris Cité Alliance	Paris, Île-de-France, France	Active	
**Lambda**	Lutetia	October 2012	Sorbonne University	Paris, Île-de-France, France	Active	
**Lambda**	Lutetia	October 2012	University of London Institute in Paris	Paris, Île-de-France, France	Active	
Mu	Hochelaga	2015	Concordia University	Montréal, Quebec, Canada	Inactive	
**Nu**	Treola	2018	University of Lille	Lille, Hauts-de-France, France	Active	
**Xi**	Rupella	2020	La Rochelle University	La Rochelle, Nouvelle-Aquitaine, France	Active	
**Omicron**	Ruscino	2021	University of Perpignan Via Domitia	Perpignan, Occitania, France	Active	

== See also ==
- Fraternities and sororities in Canada
- List of fraternities and sororities in France
- List of social fraternities
