= Robert F. Howard =

American academic and farmer (1883–1963)

- Born: February 16, 1883; Griffin, Missouri, U.S.
- Died: February 10, 1963; Wharton County, Texas, U.S.
- Occupation(s): College professor and farmer
- Known for: Founder of FarmHouse fraternity

Academic background
- Education: University of Missouri; University of Nebraska

Robert F. Howard (February 16, 1883 – February 10, 1963) was an educator, cattle rancher, and pecan farmer. He was a founder of the FarmHouse college fraternity.

== Early life ==
Howard was born on February 16, 1883, in Griffin, Missouri. He attended the University of Missouri, where he was one of seven founding members of FarmHouse fraternity in 1905. He received a B.S. in agriculture in 1908.

Howard earned a M.S. in Agriculture in 1912, teaching at the University of Nebraska from 1909 to 1912.

== Career ==
Howard was a professor of horticulture at the University of Wisconsin–Madison from 1912 to 1914. He was a professor and chairman of the Department of Horticulture at the University of Nebraska from 1914 to 1924.

== Personal life ==
He moved to Wharton, Texas, in 1924, where he ran a 2,000-acre (8 km^{2}) ranch with cattle and thousands of pecan trees. He was involved in many local and statewide civic organizations and initiatives.

He died on February 10, 1963, in Wharton County, Texas. He was buried in Evergreen Memorial Park in Wharton.
