= Hugh Miser =

American geologist

Hugh Dinsmore Miser
- Born: December 18, 1884; Pea Ridge, Arkansas, U.S.
- Died: August 1, 1969 (aged 84); Washington, D.C., U.S.
- Education: University of Arkansas
- Scientific career
- Fields: Geology

Hugh Dinsmore Miser (December 18, 1884 – August 1, 1969) was an American geologist who had a long and distinguished career with the United States Geological Survey (USGS). He is best known for his extensive work in mapping geological formations across various states, particularly in Arkansas and Oklahoma, and for his significant contributions to mineral deposit investigations critical to the United States during World War II.

== Early life and education ==
Hugh Dinsmore Miser was born in Pea Ridge, Arkansas, a village noted for the Battle of Pea Ridge during the American Civil War. He was the third child of Jordan Stanford Miser, a farmer, and Eliza Caroline Webb. His siblings included Dr. Wilson Lee Miser, a mathematician, and Cora Dot Miser, who married Dr. William Boyd Stelzner, a professor of electrical engineering.

Miser's early education took place in Pea Ridge, where he developed an interest in geology, partly due to the influence of a high school science teacher. He later attended the University of Arkansas in Fayetteville, where he was mentored by Professor Albert Homer Purdue, who recognized Miser's potential and guided him into the field of geology. Miser earned his bachelor's degree in geology in 1908 and his master's degree in 1912, both from the University of Arkansas. The university later honored him with an honorary Doctor of Laws in 1949.

== Career with the USGS ==
Miser began his career with the USGS in 1907 as a geologic aide and was quickly promoted through the ranks, becoming a junior geologist in 1910, then an associate geologist in 1912, and a full geologist in 1919. His work initially focused on Arkansas, Tennessee, and Virginia, where he became an authority on manganese deposits and diamonds in Arkansas. He temporarily left the USGS in 1919 to take the role as Acting State Geologist of Arkansas and to become a geology professor at the University of Arkansas while the college's only geology professor, Noah Fields Drake, was on leave.

Miser's most notable early work included mapping the geology of the Ouachita Mountains in Arkansas and Oklahoma. His expertise extended to the San Juan River in southeastern Utah, where he participated in a grueling expedition to map the river's course from July to October 1921. Between 1923 and 1926, Miser compiled the first geological map of Oklahoma, a significant achievement that was made possible through the cooperation of oil companies and geologists.

In 1928, Miser was appointed Chief of the Fuels Branch at the USGS, where he oversaw investigations into strategic and critical minerals during World War II. His work during this period led to the establishment of the Oil and Gas Preliminary Maps and Charts publication series, which provided vital geological information to the petroleum industry.

== Later career and legacy ==
Miser stepped down as Chief of the Fuels Branch in 1947 but continued to contribute to geology as a staff geologist with the Oklahoma Geological Survey from 1948 to 1954. During this time, he worked on revising the state geological map of Oklahoma, which was published in 1954, and he contributed to the geological map of Arkansas. After reaching the mandatory retirement age in 1954, Miser continued to serve as a scientific staff assistant in the Office of the Director at the USGS until his death from a heart attack on August 1, 1969.

Miser was a prolific author, with over 85 professional publications to his name. His work covered a wide range of topics, including diamond-bearing peridotites, the structure of the Ouachita Mountains, manganese deposits, mineralogy, and petroleum geology.

Miser was an active member of several geological societies, including the Geological Society of America, the American Association of Petroleum Geologists, and the Geological Society of Washington, where he served as president in 1938. He was also a Fellow of the American Association for the Advancement of Science and held honorary memberships in several other geological organizations, including Sigma Gamma Epsilon.

His contributions to geology were recognized with numerous honors, including the mineral miserite being named after him in 1950 and the Distinguished Service Award by the United States Department of the Interior in 1955. He has also been honored as the namesake for species of fossilized organisms, including an ostracod, Amphissites miseri, a cephalopod, Cymoceras miseri, and a graptolite, Dendrograptus miseri.
