= List of fraternities and sororities in France =

These are Greek letter social organizations founded in France, listed by chapter. Most are affiliates of the Inter Fraternity Council of France.

Fraternity or sorority	Symbol	Chapter	Institution	City	References
Nu Delta Mu	ΝΔΜ	Epsilon	University of Amiens	Amiens	
Nu Delta Mu	ΝΔΜ	Zêta		Paris	
Sigma Phi Delta	ΣΦΔ				
Sigma Thêta Pi	ΣΘΠ	Alpha	Université Joseph Fourier	Grenoble	
Sigma Thêta Pi	ΣΘΠ	Alpha	Pierre Mendès-France University	Grenoble	
Sigma Thêta Pi	ΣΘΠ	Delta	University of Picardie Jules Verne	Amiens	
Sigma Thêta Pi	ΣΘΠ	Epsilon	University of Bordeaux	Bordeaux	
Sigma Thêta Pi	ΣΘΠ	Eta	University of Dijon	Dijon	
Sigma Thêta Pi	ΣΘΠ	Gamma	Lumière University Lyon 2	Lyon	
Sigma Thêta Pi	ΣΘΠ	Gamma	Université Jean Moulin	Lyon	
Sigma Thêta Pi	ΣΘΠ	Zeta	University of Nancy	Nancy	
Zeta Lambda Zeta	ΖΛΖ	Alpha	University of Bordeaux	Bordeaux	
Zeta Lambda Zeta	ΖΛΖ	Gamma	University of Amiens	Amiens	
Zeta Lambda Zeta	ΖΛΖ	Delta	University of Nantes	Nantes	
Zeta Lambda Zeta	ΖΛΖ	Dzêta	Citywide	Paris	
Zeta Lambda Zeta	ΖΛΖ	Theta	Citywide	Lyon	
Zeta Lambda Zeta	ΖΛΖ	Iota		Lille	
Zeta Lambda Zeta	ΖΛΖ	Kappa		Marseille	

== See also ==
- List of social fraternities
- List of social sororities and women's fraternities
