= D. Howard Doane =

American agricultural pioneer

- Born: Duane Howard Doane; July 30, 1883; Mexico, New York, U.S.
- Died: February 19, 1984 (aged 100); Branson, Missouri, U.S.
- Education: University of Missouri
- Occupations: Businessperson, writer
- Employer: Doane Agricultural Services
- Known for: Founder of FarmHouse fraternity

Duane Howard Doane (July 30, 1883 – February 19, 1984) was an American agricultural pioneer with the U.S. Department of Agriculture, the state of Missouri, and in the private sector. He founded and was the chairman of the board of Doane Agricultural Services, which is the oldest farm management, appraisal, and agricultural research organization in the United States. In 2015, Doane became a subsidiary of Farm Journal. He also started the nation's first school of farm management at the University of Missouri.

== Early life ==
Doane was born on a farm near Mexico, New York in 1883. He went to high school in Joplin, Missouri.

He received a B.S. in agriculture in 1908 and M.S. in farm management in 1909 at the University of Missouri. While there, he founded FarmHouse fraternity.

== Career ==
At the University of Missouri in 1910, Doane worked under William Jasper Spillman and the U.S. Department of Agriculture to complete a study of farm management; he was the administrative head of the university's department of farm management until 1916. He also performed surveying work in North and South Dakota for Spillman. In 1912, he organized the first county agent program in Missouri. He also organized the state's 4-H and first State Farm Bureau.

He then worked as an appraiser for the Mississippi Valley Trust Company. He also managed farms, including a 13,000-acre cotton plantation.

In 1919, Doane started Doane Agricultural Services in Poplar Bluff, Missouri with his brother Earl who was a mining engineer. It was a farm management, appraisal, and agricultural research business. One of its services was managing farms for absentee owners. In 1943, he incorporated the company, which had moved to St. Louis, and gradually transferred its ownership to its employees. He served as chairman of the board of this multi-million dollar corporation until 1969 but remained on the board until 1973. At one time, it was the largest business of its kind in the United States.

In 1943, he worked with John W. Oakley to develop the Bobshaw strain of cotton which revitalized the cotton industry. Also in 1943, he was the first chair of the Missouri State Commission on Resources and Development (now the Division of Commerce and Industrial Development). In 1948, President Herbert Hoover appointed Doane served on the agriculture subcommittee of the Hoover Commission, charged with reorganizing the United States Department of Agriculture.

Doane was chairman of the National Joint Committee on Rural Credits. He was the first president of the American Society of Farm Managers and Rural Appraisers. a board member of the National Farm Chemurgic Council, and a founding trustee of the St. Louis Agricultural Institute.

Doane wrote four books and numerous articles for the leading agricultural journals and magazines.

== Personal life ==
Doane's first wife was named Eureth Grant and his second wife was Nancy Waithall of Point Lookout, Missouri. Doane and his first wife adopted a daughter named Helen Doane Brown. In 1966, they moved to a house on the campus of the School of the Ozarks. He received an honorary Doctor of Laws from the University of Missouri in 1963.

Doane and his wife were generous donors to Doane College, the Missouri 4-H Club Foundation, the Presbyterian church, the School of the Ozarks, and the University of Missouri. They also gave to the FarmHouse Foundation; Doane served on its first board of directors in 1965. Doane was president of the national FarmHouse fraternity. He was a charter member of the Missouri chapter of Alpha Zeta. He founded the Kiwanis in Poplar Bluff, Missouri in 1921 and served as its first president.

In 1984, Doane died in Skaggs Community Hospital in Branson, Missouri.

== Publications ==
- Sheep Feeding and Farm Management (Ginn and Company, 1912)
- County Farm Adviser Plan (1913)
- Vertical Farm Diversification (University of Oklahoma Press, 1950)
- Obituary February 19th, 1984 (Local Newspaper 1984)

ISBN 978-0-8061-0218-4
