= Griffin, Missouri =

Unincorporated community in Missouri, U.S.

Coordinates: 37°04′50″N 93°22′42″W

Griffin is an unincorporated community in Christian County, in the U.S. state of Missouri.

== History ==
A post office called Griffin was established in 1886, and remained in operation until 1907. The community was named after the proprietor of a nearby mill.
