= Melvin E. Sherwin =

American agronomist (1881–1924)

- Born: Melvin Ernest Sherwin; July 17, 1881 – January 5, 1924; South Dakota, U.S.
- Died: January 5, 1924 (aged 42); Raleigh, North Carolina, U.S.
- Burial place: Historic Oakwood Cemetery (Raleigh, North Carolina)
- Occupation: Adacemic
- Known for: Founding FarmHouse fraternity

Academic background
- Education: University of Missouri, B.S. Agriculture, 1908; University of California, Berkeley, M.A. Agriculture, 1909

Academic work
- Discipline: Agriculture
- Sub-discipline: Soil Science
- Institutions: University of Maine; North Carolina State University

Melvin Ernest Sherwin (July 17, 1881 – January 5, 1924) was an American soil scientist, agronomist, academic, and founding member of FarmHouse fraternity. He was a professor and department head in soil sciences at what is now North Carolina State University.

== Early life ==
Serwin was born in South Dakota on July 17, 1881. He enrolled in the University of Missouri in 1903 and graduated with a B.S. in agriculture in 1908. While there, he became one of the seven founders of the FarmHouse fraternity on April 15, 1905.

He received an M.A. in agriculture from the University of California, Berkeley in 1909.

== Career ==
While he was a graduate student, Shewin was an instructor of agronomy at the University of California. In the fall of 1909, he became an assistant professor of agronomy at the University of Maine. In 1910, he joined the faculty the North Carolina State College of Agriculture & Mechanical Arts (now North Carolina State University) as a professor of soils and the head of its soils department. This was the first professional position in soils at the university.

Sherwin was noted for his investigative work with drainage lines. In November 1936, he was elected president of the North Carolina Drainage Association. He wrote a laboratory guide on soils that was used as a textbook in North Carolina's agricultural high schools. He also helped train county agricultural agents, spoke at the North Carolina Drainage Convention, and presented a paper at the conference of the North Carolina Academy of Science. He also spoke at the Association of Southern Agricultural Workers in February 1921.

== Personal life ==
Sherwin was married Edith Dodson of Centrilia, Missouri. The couple had five children, including Sidney T Sherwin and Edith Evelyn Sherwin. He lived on Avent Ferry Road in Raleigh, North Carolina and owned a farm in Hyde County, near Lake Mattamuskeet.

On January 3, 1924, he became ill and fell unconscious from uremic acidosis. After contracting spinal meningitis two days later and never regaining consciousness, he died on January 5, 1924, in Rex Hospital in Raleigh at the age of 42. His funeral was held at the Edenton Street United Methodist Church in Raleigh. He was buried in the Historic Oakwood Cemetery in Raleigh.

After his death, his widow married his brother, Herbert A. Sherwin, and lived in Greensboro, North Carolina.

== Select publications ==
- Observations on the status of corn growing in California. (College of Agriculture Agricultural Experiment Station Circular 70) Berkeley: University of California, August 1911
- The production of the lima bean: the need and possibility of its improvement. with George Wright Shaw. (College of Agriculture Agricultural Experiment Station Bulletin 224) Berkeley: University of California Publications, November 1911.
