= Henry P. Rusk =

American academic and agronomist (1884–1954)

- Born: Henry Perly Rusk; July 18, 1884; Champaign County, Illinois, US
- Died: January 9, 1954 (aged 69); Urbana, Illinois, US
- Burial place: Mount Hope Cemetery, Champaign, Illinois
- Known for: Founder of FarmHouse fraternity
- Title: Dean, Chairman, Professor

Academic background
- Education: Valparaiso University, BS, 1904 University of Minnesota, BS, 1908 and MS, 1911

Academic work
- Discipline: Agriculture
- Sub-discipline: Cattle husbandry
- Institutions: University of Illinois, 1910-1952

Henry Perly Rusk (July 18, 1884 – January 9, 1954) was an American academic, administrator, and agronomist. He was the dean of the College of Agriculture at the University of Illinois. He was a founder of FarmHouse fraternity and served as its national president.

== Early life ==
Rusk was born on July 18, 1884, on a farm in Champaign County, Illinois in 1884. His family moved to Valparaiso, Indiana when he was a child.

Rusk attended Valparaiso University, graduating with a B.S. in agriculture in 1904. He then attended the University of Missouri, where he received a B.S. in agriculture in 1908 and an M.S. in agriculture in 1911. While an undergraduate at Missouri, he was a founding member of FarmHouse fraternity in 1905.

== Career ==
Rusk taught and supervised cattle feeding research at the University of Missouri in 1908. In 1910, he joined the faculty of University of Illinois, working in beef cattle research. One of his duties was organizing the annual Illinois Cattle Feeders Day. He became professor with the University of Illinois in the Department of Animal Husbandry in 1914. He was head of the Department of Animal Sciences from 1922 to 1939 and also served as dean of the College of Agriculture for thirteen years, starting in 1939 until his retirement. After being a faculty member at Illinois for 43 years, he became a dean emeritus on September 1, 1952.

Rusk was the chairman of the agricultural task force of the Hoover Commission in 1948. This led to his working on the reorganization of federal lending policies. He was an advocate for government control of agriculture and was a frequent public speaker on this subject.

Rusk was president of the American Society of Animal Science from 1925 to 1926. He was a member of the Association of Land Grant Colleges and Universities. He was the secretary of the Illinois Cattle Feeders' Association. He was also a cattle judge, known for officiating the American Royal and North American International Livestock Expo. He also had leadership roles with the Farm Foundation, the Illinois State Fair, and the National Research Council.

== Awards and honors ==
Rusk was a member of several professional fraternities and honor societies, including Alpha Zeta, Gamma Sigma Delta, and Sigma Xi. In 1946, the Saddle and Sirloin Club commissioned a portrait of Rusk by Othmar J. Hoffler to be displayed in its Chicago clubhouse; this portrait collection is for inductees in The Livestock Industry Hall of Fame. The American Farm Bureau Federation gave Rusk its gold medal in 1947 for distinguished service.

Rusk received an honorary doctorate from the University of Missouri in June 1950. He also received honorary degrees from the Illinois Wesleyan University and Purdue University. The University of Illinois chapter of Sigma Delta Chi gave Rusk its annual Brown Derby Award for outstanding service to the university in 1952. In February 1954, the Champaign Rotary made a presentation honoring Rusk.

== Personal life ==
Rusk married Edith E. Hartley in 1914. They had two daughters, Elizabeth and Martha.

He served as the national president of FarmHouse. He was also a member of Alpha Gamma Rho collegiate agricultural fraternity. He was a member of the Rotary International in Nebraska and the Methodist Church.

On January 9, 1954, Rusk died in the Carle Memorial Hospital in Urbana, Illinois at the age of 69. He had been in poor health for several years. His funeral was held in Smith Music Hall at the University of Illinois, with nearly 1,000 people in attendance. He was buried in Mount Hope Cemetery in Champaign, Illinois, adjacent to the University of Illinois campus.
