= Pi Nu Epsilon =

American musical performing arts honor society

- ΠΝΕ
- The Pi Nu Epsilon watchkey
- Founded: January 1927; 99 years ago Armour Institute of Technology
- Type: Honor
- Affiliation: Independent
- Status: Active
- Emphasis: Music, for non-Music majors
- Scope: National
- Symbol: Pentagon
- Publication: Pi Nuz
- Chapters: 2 active
- Headquarters: 2159 White Street; Suite 3, #104; York, Pennsylvania 17404; United States
- Website: pinuepsilon.com

Pi Nu Epsilon (ΠΝΕ) is an American gender inclusive honor fraternity for students involved with music but who are non-music majors. It was established in 1927 at the Armour Institute of Technology in Chicago, Illinois.

== History ==
Pi Nu Epsilon was founded at Armour Institute of Technology in January 1927 as a music fraternity for non-music majors. Pi Nu Epsilon was founded by four members of the class of 1927, four members of the class of 1928, and Professor Emeritus Charles Wilbur Leigh. The undergraduate founders were Thornton J. Clark, David G. Greenfield, W. McDowell Horn, Nicholas Markoff, Kent H. Parker, George Rezac, William E. Vevurka, and Willard Wilson.

From the beginning, the fraternity focused on non-music majors and operated as a recognition society and service organization. It membership was limited to juniors or seniors who had been a members of music clubs, with distinguished service. It had a strong service component, "in the furtherance of good music". The purpose of Pi Nu Epsilon is:

- To honor those outstanding men and women who have devoted their time and efforts to the musical organizations at the institutions of the respective chapters.
- To stimulate interest in and to further the aims of the musical organizations at the institutions of the respective chapters.
- To foster and develop a broader interest in music and musical affairs.

Pi Nu Epsilon aided the musical organizations at the Alpha chapter by sponsoring and promoting the musical activities on campus. It thrived for many years under the guidance of Dr. O. Gordon Erickson, who served as music director at Armour Institute of Technology from 1932 until his death in August 1953. In 1940, Armour Institute of Technology and Lewis Institute merged to form the Illinois Institute of Technology.

Pi Nu Epsilon was formally incorporated as a nonprofit organization in the state of Illinois on May 16, 1947. Later that month, on May 28, 1947, the Beta chapter was founded at Drexel Institute of Technology. Gamma chapter (later renamed Epsilon) was founded on April 30, 1955 at Ursinus College. Delta chapter was founded on May 12, 1956, at Shippensburg University. Finally, Zeta chapter was founded on April 15, 1989, at Millersville University in Millersville, Pennsylvania. Slow expansion has continued, with the installation of Eta chapter at Thiel College on December 11, 2011.

Its national headquarters is in York, Pennsylvania.

== Symbols ==
Pi Nu Epsilon's symbol is the pentagon, symbolizing the five music societies that had formed at the Armour Institute of Technology before the fraternity's was established. The name Pi Nu Epsilon was selected because the letters ΠΝΕ are the first three letters of the word "Pentagon” in Greek. The society's key is shaped like a pentagon. Its publication is Pi Nuz.

== Activities ==
Pi Nu Epsilon offers social activities for its members and promotes campus music organizations. The society provides ushering at university performances, caroling at nursing homes, volunteer at local parades, fundraise for non-profit student radio stations and several chapters sponsor a "Battle of the Bands" competition.

The society holds an national convention each year, when national officers are elected. It also presents musical and vocal music awards annually. In addition, the Beta chapter held an annual music competition for Philadelphia high school students.

== Membership ==
Pi Nu Epsilon draws a majority of members from campus bands, choirs and ensembles. Potential members must be an undergraduate who have been a member in a musical or performing arts organization for at least one semester. Examples of eligible student organizations include A Cappella choirs, chamber choirs, concert bands, concert choirs, dance ensembles, jazz band, jazz choirs, marching bands, pep bands, string ensembles, and theater groups. The fraternity is gender inclusive.

== Governance ==
Pi Nu Epsilon is governed by a national council consisting of a president, vice president of internal affairs, vice president of external affairs, treasurer, secretary, historian, and chapter representatives.

== Chapters ==
Following are the chapters of Pi Nu Epsilon, with active chapters indicated in bold and inactive chapters in italics.

Chapter	Charter date and range	Institution	Location	Status	Ref.
Alpha	January 1927–1980	Illinois Institute of Technology	Chicago, Illinois	Inactive	(Note: Chapter formed at the Armor Institute, which later merged to form the Illinois Institute of Technology.)
**Beta**	May 28, 1947	Drexel University	Philadelphia, Pennsylvania	Active	
Gamma (see Epsilon)	April 30, 1955 – 19xx ?	Ursinus College	Collegeville, Pennsylvania	Inactive	
Delta	May 12, 1956 – 2016	Shippensburg University	Shippensburg, Pennsylvania	Inactive	
Epsilon (see Gamma)	xxxx ? – 2004	Ursinus College	Collegeville, Pennsylvania	Inactive	
Zeta	April 15, 1989 – 2007	Millersville University	Millersville, Pennsylvania	Inactive	
**Eta**	December 11, 2011	Thiel College	Chicago, Illinois	Active	
