= Iota Beta Chi =

Canadian collegiate sorority

- ΙΒΧ
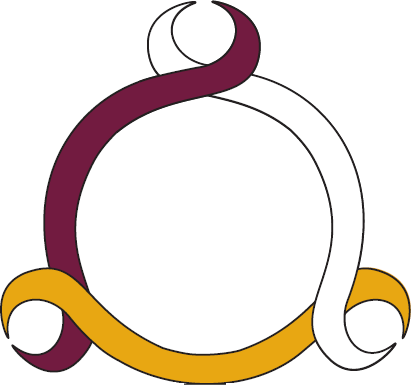
- Founded: 6 January 1997; 29 years ago Dalhousie University
- Type: Social
- Affiliation: Independent
- Status: Active
- Scope: National
- Motto: Ducta per gratia
- Colors: Burgundy, White, and Old Gold
- Flower: Yellow Rose
- Jewel: Garnet
- Mascot: Wolf
- Publication: IBX Times
- Chapters: 2
- Members: 300+ lifetime
- Nickname: IBChi's
- Headquarters: Halifax, Nova Scotia; Canada
- Website: www.iotabetachi.com

Iota Beta Chi (ΙΒΧ) is a Canadian social sorority. Its two chapters are in Halifax, Nova Scotia, and Fredericton, New Brunswick. Between these two chapters their membership totals over 300 members.

There are three different divisions of Iota Beta Chi: the active chapters which recruit and are run by undergraduate members; the alumnae chapters which are made of Iota Beta Chi alumnae; and the headquarters, which is composed of volunteering members of Iota Beta Chi's alumnae.

== History ==
=== Founding (Alpha chapter) ===
Iota Beta Chi Sorority came to be after its founding mother Gwen (Butler) Butcher originally planned to join another sorority during her first semester at Dalhousie University. She decided that it was not the right fit for her and shortly afterward she had a conversation with a friend of hers, which ended with her deciding to start a sorority of her own.

With the help of brothers from local fraternities (one from the local Sigma Chi chapter and another from the local Phi Kappa Pi chapter), as well as multiple female friends including Lorraine Wasson, Jessica Maddison and Kristy Childs, she created Iota Beta Chi.

The official founding date of Iota Beta Chi Sorority is January 6, 1997. On this date, the founding sisters: Gwen, Lorraine, Jessica and Kristy; presented themselves to the Dalhousie University campus in hopes to recruit new members. While the winter of 1997 was not successful, these founding members did not give up and tried again in the fall of 1997, this time with seven new members. This chapter of Iota Beta Chi is known as the Alpha chapter.

=== Beta chapter ===
Sarah Simons started her first year at University of New Brunswick in Fredericton, NB. She noticed a lack of Greek letter organizations for women and wanted to bring that experience there. Sarah reached out to the local Zeta Psi fraternity chapter to find out where to start and eventually started researching different sororities. She happened to come across Iota Beta Chi and she saw the ideals and felt that they matched what she wanted in a sisterhood.

Sarah approached the Alpha chapter with her interest in opening a Beta chapter and after talking with Lorraine, a founding member, she learned all about the sorority she wanted to be a part of. With Lorraine's help and the help of the Zeta Psis, she organized and executed her first recruitment period in the winter semester of 2001. Sarah was successful with 6 initial members becoming founding sisters of the Beta chapter: Sarah Simons, Marge Atkinson, Amy Lister, Erin Sheridan, Lindsey Thompson and Brandy White.

== Symbols ==
The crest of the Sorority consists of three ribbons overlapping to create a circle. The three ribbons are burgundy, white and old gold respectively. The edges of the ribbons overlap the following way: the burgundy overlaps the white, the other end of the white ribbon overlaps one end of the old gold ribbon, and the other end of the old gold ribbon overlaps the lower end of the burgundy ribbon. When depicted, the old gold ribbon is always on the bottom, with the burgundy ribbon on the left side of the crest and the white ribbon on the right side (when viewing the crest). The outer edges of each of the ribbons curl back in to form much smaller circular shape.

The sorority's animal is the wolf. Its jewel is the garnet. Its colors are burgundy, white, and old gold. Its motto is Ducta per gratia. The sorority's publication is IBX Times.

== Philanthropy ==
In the past the Alpha chapter has worked closely with local food banks, women shelters, children's hospital, Relay for Life and Ronald McDonald House. The Beta chapter also works with women shelters, yearly Run for the Cure races and other events for women's empowerment.
