= Ceres (women's fraternity) =

North American agricultural fraternity

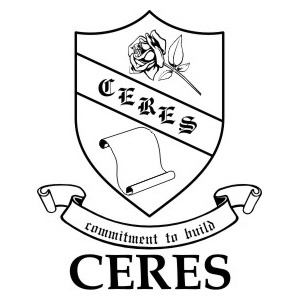
- Founded: October 12, 1985; 40 years ago Colorado State University
- Type: Social
- Affiliation: Independent
- Status: Defunct
- Defunct date: September 2024
- Emphasis: Agriculture
- Scope: North America
- Motto: "Commitment to Build"
- Pillars: Commitment, Agricultural Orientation, Leadership, Scholarship, Fellowship
- Colors: Violet and Gold
- Flower: Sterling silver rose
- Jewel: Amethyst and Pearl
- Patron Roman deity: Ceres
- Publication: The Rose and Scroll
- Chapters: 1 active, 13 inactive
- Headquarters: 690 Prisk Street; Belleville, Wisconsin 53508; United States
- Website: ceresfraternity.com

Ceres was an international women's fraternity focused on agriculture. It was created as a women's version of FarmHouse fraternity. Its first chapter was chartered at Colorado State University in 1984. The fraternity ceased operations in the fall of 2024. However, a chapter at the University of Wisconsin–Platteville continues to operate as a local fraternity.

== History ==
In 1978, the international board of FarmHouse fraternity proposed creating chapters for women. At its 1980 international conclave, FarmHouse passed a proposal to establish women's 4-H clubs on select college campuses, including Colorado State University, University of Alberta and California State Polytechnic University, Pomoma. FarmHouse also surveyed 4-H chapters and associations, finding that 65 percent were in support of the creation of a women's agricultural fraternity.

A proposal for the “establishment of an agricultural-related women's sorority formed in the image of FarmHouse” was unanimously approved by conclave delegates on August 17, 1984. A committee of 4-H men and women selected the name Ceres Fraternity for the separate women's fraternity.

On October 12, 1985, Ceres chartered its first chapter at Colorado State University, initiating nineteen members. This was followed by chapters at the University of Alberta and California State Polytechnic University, Pomona in 1986. The fraternity held its first biennial conclave in August 1986 at the University of Alberta in Edmonton, Canada. Joan Blackwelder became the first president of the fraternity's international board.

The international office for FarmHouse provided staffing and programming support until 1994, when Ceres had grown to the point that it could hire a part-time executive director. Its international office was at 690 Prisk Street in Belleville, Wisconsin.

By 2000, Ceres had chartered fourteen chapters in the United States and Canada. In September 2024, the national Ceres fraternity ceased its operations due to declining membership. At this time, all chapters disbanded but had the option of continuing as local fraternities. A chapter at the University of Wisconsin–Platteville continues to operate as a local women's fraternity.

== Symbols ==
The organization was named Ceres after the Roman goddess of agriculture. Ceres' motto was "Commitment to Build". Its five attributes or pillars were commitment, agricultural orientation, leadership, scholarship, and fellowship.

The fraternity's colors were violet and gold. Its flower was the sterling silver rose. Its jewels were the amethyst and pearl. Its publication was The Rose and Scroll.

== Chapters ==
In the following list, active chapters are in bold and inactive chapters in italics.

Chapter	Charter date and range	Institution	Location	Status	Ref.
Alpha	October 12, 1985 – before 2010	Colorado State University	Fort Collins, Colorado	Inactive	(Note: Predecessor group was the FarmHouse Women's Club, formed in 1978; the women's fraternity (sorority) began operations in 1985 with the Alpha chapter at CSU.)
Beta	February 15, 1986 – 19xx ?; March 2007 – 2023	University of Alberta	Edmonton, Alberta, Canada	Inactive	(Note: Predecessor group was the FarmHouse Little Sisters. It withdrew and became the local group KORE.)
Gamma	March 1, 1986 – before 2010	California State Polytechnic University, Pomona	Pomona, California	Inactive	(Note: Predecessor group was the FarmHouse Little Sisters.)
Delta	November 14, 1987 – before 2010	California State University, Fresno	Fresno, California	Inactive	
**Epsilon**	April 15, 1989	University of Wisconsin–Platteville	Platteville, Wisconsin	Active	
Zeta	April 22, 1989 – before 2010	Montana State University	Bozeman, Montana	Inactive	
Eta	November 23, 1991 – September 15, 2024	South Dakota State University	Brookings, South Dakota	Inactive	
Theta	March 19, 1994 – before 2017	North Dakota State University	Fargo, North Dakota	Inactive	
Iota	April 30, 1994 – before 2017	Illinois State University	Normal, Illinois	Inactive	
Kappa	April 27, 1996 – before 2010	New Mexico State University	Las Cruces, New Mexico	Inactive	
Lambda	November 23, 1996 – before 2010	Western Kentucky University	Bowling Green, Kentucky	Inactive	
Mu	April 19, 1997 – before 2017	North Carolina State University	Raleigh, North Carolina	Inactive	
Nu	April 26, 1997 – before 2017	University of Kentucky	Lexington, Kentucky	Inactive	
Xi	September 16, 2000 – before 2017	Washington State University	Pullman, Washington	Inactive	

== See also ==
- List of social sororities and women's fraternities
- Professional fraternities and sororities
