= Phi Kappa Pi =

Canadian collegiate fraternity

- ΦΚΠ
- Founded: March 22, 1913; 113 years ago: McGill University; University of Toronto
- Type: Social
- Affiliation: Independent
- Status: Active
- Scope: National
- Motto: "Canada's Only National Fraternity"
- Colors: Royal Blue and Gold
- Chapters: 4 active, 6 inactive
- Nickname: Phi Kap
- Headquarters: 3444 Rue Hutchison; Montreal, Québec H2X 2G4; Canada
- Website: pkpabg.com

Phi Kappa Pi (ΦΚΠ) is a Canadian national fraternity. Founded on March 22, 1913, as Canada's only national fraternity, Phi Kappa Pi has active chapters in Burnaby, Halifax, and Toronto, as well as seven inactive chapters. There are alumni chapters associated with most undergraduate locations, as well as a National Council. The fraternity operates as a social one on all of the campuses upon which it resides.

== History ==
Phi Kappa Pi Fraternity was founded in 1913, by two previously existing and separate organizations. Sigma Pi (local), founded in Toronto in 1901 and Alpha Beta Gamma (local), founded in Montreal in 1905, joined forces to create Canada's first and only national fraternity. The individual organizations' names became their chapter names.

In 1923, alumni from the Alpha Beta Gamma chapter approached the Phi Kappa Pi National Council about the possibility of expanding to Dalhousie University in Halifax, Nova Scotia. The expansion request was approved, and a chapter was founded. The chapter was the first fraternity to be located on Dalhousie's campus, and was named the Dalhousie chapter until 1959 when it received its Greek name, Zeta Gamma. The following year, 1924, Alpha Iota chapter was established at the University of British Columbia, followed by Delta Mu chapter in 1930 at the University of Alberta, Tau Sigma Rho chapter in 1935 at the University of Manitoba, and Alpha Epsilon chapter in 1967 at the University of Waterloo.

The 1970s proved to be a tough decade for Phi Kappa Pi, with 4 chapters being lost. Alpha Iota and Alpha Epsilon both closed down in 1974, followed by Tau Sigma Rho in 1975, and one of the founding chapters, Alpha Beta Gamma in 1976. Alpha Beta Gamma, however, would be reopened in 1990 with the help of alumni from Phi Kappa Pi's then remaining two chapters. Soon after, in 2000, Theta Kappa Omicron chapter opened at the University of Ottawa, and Omega Iota opened in 2006 at the University of Ontario Institute of Technology.

In September 2008, Simon Fraser University's student body voted 57% in favour of overturning the university's ban on Greek life on campus. The Omega Epsilon chapter opened on the university's campus in 2012. Phi Kappa Pi was the first Greek life organization to open on the Simon Fraser campus. Despite its establishment, the Omega Epsilon chapter has yet to be officially recognized by the university. Lack of institutional recognition is common across the Canadian fraternity system. Nevertheless, the Simon Fraser chapter continues to operate on and off campus as it tries to help convey a social life within the university's community.

== Symbols ==
Phi Kappa Pi's motto is "Canada's Only National Fraternity". Its colors are royal blue and gold. Its nickname is Phi Kap.

== Chapters ==
Until at least 1976, the chapter names were the name of the local from which it was formed, except in the case of Dalhousie. Following is a list of chapters. Active chapters are indicated in bold. Inactive chapters are in italics.

Name	Charter date and range	Institution	Location	Status	Ref.
**Sigma Pi**	1901	Ryerson University	Toronto	Active	
**Sigma Pi**	1901	University of Toronto	Toronto	Active	
**Sigma Pi**	1901	York University	Toronto	Active	
**Alpha Beta Gamma**	1905–1976; 1990–2025 ?	Concordia University	Montreal	Inactive	
**Alpha Beta Gamma**	1905–1976; 1990–2025 ?	McGill University	Montreal	Inactive	
**Zeta Gamma**	1923	Dalhousie University	Halifax, Nova Scotia	Active	
**Zeta Gamma**	1923	Mount Saint Vincent University	Halifax, Nova Scotia	Active	
**Zeta Gamma**	1923	Saint Mary's University	Halifax, Nova Scotia	Active	
Alpha Iota	1924–1974	University of British Columbia	Vancouver	Inactive	
Delta Mu	1930–197x ?; 19xx ?–1995	University of Alberta	Edmonton	Inactive	(Note: Chapter formed by members of the Rocky Mountain Goat Club.)
Tau Sigma Rho	October 2, 1935 – 1975	University of Manitoba	Winnipeg	Inactive	
Alpha Epsilon	1967–1975	University of Waterloo	Waterloo, Ontario	Inactive	
Theta Kappa Omicron	2000–20xx ?	University of Ottawa ?	Ottawa	Inactive	
Omega Iota	2006–202x ?	University of Ontario Institute of Technology	Oshawa	Inactive	
**Omega Epsilon**	2012	Simon Fraser University	Burnaby	Active	

== Notable members ==
Name	Chapter	University	Notability	Ref.
Nels Crutchfield	Alpha Beta Gamma	McGill University	NHL player	
Joe Ghiz	Zeta Gamma	Dalhousie University	Former Premier of Prince Edward Island	
John Gomery	Alpha Beta Gamma	McGill University	Canadian Justice; after retirement led Gomery Commission	
Dr. Philip Lapp	Alpha Beta Gamma	McGill University	Canadarm lead engineer; Order of Canada (1985)	
Dr. Sidney Smith	Zeta Gamma	Dalhousie University	Former Canadian Secretary of State, and 7th President of University of Toronto	
Ernest MacMillan	Sigma Pi	University of Toronto	Orchestral conductor and composer	
Russell MacLellan	Zeta Gamma	Dalhousie University	Former Premier of Nova Scotia	
Russell McConnell	Alpha Beta Gamma	McGill University	NHL prospect	
Jack McGill	Alpha Beta Gamma	McGill University	NHL player	
Charles Catto	Sigma Pi	University of Toronto	Founder of Frontiers Foundation	
Derek Hart	Alpha Beta Gamma	McGill University	Statistics Professor at McGill University	
Thomas Stanfield	Zeta Gamma	Dalhousie University	Former President and CEO of Stanfield's	

== See also ==
- List of fraternities and sororities at Dalhousie University
- Fraternities and sororities in Canada
