= Henry H. Krusekopf =

American soil scientist and academic (1886–1979)

- Born: Henry Herman Krusekopf; January 7, 1885; Casco, Michigan, US
- Died: July 26, 1979 (aged 94); Columbia, Missouri, US
- Known for: Founding FarmHouse fraternity

Academic background
- Education: Normal Academy, 1904; University of Missouri, B.S. 1908 University of Missouri, M.S. 1916 University of Illinois
- Thesis: The Soils of Missouri (1916)

Academic work
- Discipline: Agriculture
- Sub-discipline: Soil Science
- Institutions: University of Missouri

Henry Herman Krusekopf (January 7, 1885 – July 26, 1979) was an American academic and soil scientist. He spent 48 years as a professor and researcher in the College of Agriculture at the University of Missouri. He was also a founding member of FarmHouse fraternity.

== Early life and education ==
Krusekopf was born in Casco, Michigan on January 7, 1885. His father was Henry Krusekopf, a minister. When he was a child, his family moved to Weldon Springs, Missouri, followed by Chamois, Missouri. He attended Chamois High School, graduating in 1903. He graduated from the Normal Academy in 1904.

He received his B.S. in agriculture from the University of Missouri in Columbia, Missouri in 1908. While at the University of Missouri, he was a member of the Y.M.C.A. Bible Study Group and was a founding member of FarmHouse fraternity on April 15, 1905. He earned his master's degree from the University of Missouri in 1916. His thesis was The Soils of Missouri. In 1932, he did post-graduate work at the University of Illinois.

== Career ==
After receiving his undergraduate degree, Krusekopf worked as a soil survey assistant in the University of Missouri's soils department. In 1916, he became a professor of soils at the College of Agriculture of the University of Missouri for 48 years. He became a professor emeritus after his retirement in June 1956.

He was a consultant to several federal, state, and international agencies. He prepared reports about the Missouri River Basin for the United States Army Corps of Engineers. He worked for the United States Bureau of Soils in Conway, South Carolina; the United States Reclamation Service in the Columbia River Basin in Oregon and Washington; and the National Resource Board that covered Illinois, Indiana, Iowa, Missouri, and Ohio. After he retired, he wrote a report on Missouri's forest soils for the United States Forest Service and was a consultant for the United States Department of Justice regarding American Indian land claims in Missouri. He wrote numerous articles on soil development.

He was a member of the Soil Science Society of America. In April 1923, he became a charter member of the Society of Sigma Xi, an honor society for scientists and engineers. He was a charter member of the Alpha Zeta agricultural fraternity and the Gamma Sigma Delta honor society for agriculture, serving as the vice president of the latter. He was also a member of the American Association of University Professors.

== Personal life ==
Krusekopf married Nancy Form Smith of Joplin, Missouri on September 20, 1913. They had six children, including Caroline, Charlotte, Emily, Fred, Henry H. Jr., and Paul. They had a farm in southeast Missouri.

In 1923, he formed the Evangelical Student Group which became the Columbia United Church of Christ. He was a president of the University Faculty Club.

Krusekopf died at his home on July 26, 1978 at the age of 94. He was buried in Memorial Park Cemetery in Columbia, Missouri. FarmHouse and Alpha Zeta established the Henry H. Krusekopf Scholarship Fund in his honor.

== Publications ==
=== Monographs ===
- The Missouri Soil Survey. Columbia: University of Missouri, Agricultural Experiment Station, Circular. 104, March 1921.
- Soil Fertility Investigations: Rolling Prairie Land of Southwestern Missouri (Eldorado Springs Experiment Field). Columbia: University of Missouri, Agricultural Experiment Station, Bulletin 398, June 1938.
- Major Soil Areas of Missouri: Their General Characteristics and Agricultural Use. Columbia: University of Missouri, Agricultural Experiment Station, Circular 304, August 1945.

=== Journals ===
- "Salt domes of east Texas basin". Oil & Gas Journal, vol. 57 (May 4, 1959) p. 143.

=== Editor ===
- Life and Work of C. F. Marbut: Soil Scientist, Professor of Geology, 1895–1910, University of Missouri, Soil Scientist, 1910–1935, U.S.D.A. Bureau of Chemistry and Soils: A Memorial Volumnet. Soil Science Society of America. Memorial Committee, 1942.
