= FarmHouse =

North American collegiate fraternity

- FH
- Founded: April 15, 1905; 120 years ago University of Missouri
- Type: Social
- Affiliation: NIC
- Status: Active
- Scope: International
- Motto: "Builder of Men"
- Colors: Green; White; Gold
- Symbol: Sickle and sheaf
- Flag
- Flower: Red and white rose
- Chapters: 34 active
- Headquarters: 1021 Jefferson Street; Kansas City, Missouri 64105; United States
- Website: www.farmhouse.org

FarmHouse (FH) is a men's social fraternity founded at the University of Missouri on April 15, 1905. It became a national organization in 1921. Today FarmHouse has 34 active chapters in the United States and Canada.

== History ==
FarmHouse was founded as a professional agriculture fraternity on April 15, 1905, by seven men at the University of Missouri, who met at a YMCA bible study and decided they wanted to form a club. The seven founders were D. Howard Doane, Robert F. Howard, Claude B. Hutchison, Henry H. Krusekopf, Earl W. Rusk, Henry P. Rusk, and Melvin E. Sherwin. Doane conceived the basic ideas which led to FarmHouse and is considered the father of the fraternity.

The name "FarmHouse" was chosen for the following reasons:

Given their agricultural background and rural upbringing, the house in which they resided began to be referred to as the farmer's house, by other students in a derogatory or demeaning way. The men living in the house however felt the name was appropriate as they knew the farm home to be a welcoming place for people to gather, to enjoy each other’s fellowship, to share a meal together, after a hard day’s work. This same welcoming environment of a farm home could be offered on a college campus, for studious men majoring in agriculture who possessed a strong work ethic. And so the group proudly took on the name FARMHOUSE.

A second chapter was founded at the University of Nebraska in 1911, organized by founder Robert F. Howard. After communication between the two groups, a third chapter was founded at the University of Illinois in 1914. FarmHouse became a national organization in 1921 by approval of each of the active chapters. On April 20, 1974, the FarmHouse Club at the University of Alberta in Edmonton, Alberta, Canada, was the first chapter established outside the United States. With the establishment of the Alberta chapter, FarmHouse became an international fraternity.

FarmHouse joined the North American Interfraternity Conference in 1944. Because of its size at the time, eight chapters, it was not considered eligible for full membership. With twelve chapters and three colonies, FarmHouse became a full-fledged member on March 25, 1953. FarmHouse dropped out of the NIC from 1971 to 1981, as did many other national and international fraternities.

In 1974, the fraternity re-affirmed its alcohol-free housing stance by passing the stance in the bylaws at the Conclave of that year. In 1998, the NIC awarded FarmHouse the NIC Laurel Wreath for leading the path in alcohol-free housing.

At the 1984 conclave, the fraternity unanimously passed a "Proposal for the Establishment of an Agricultural Sorority". Three of the women's groups which had been affiliated with FarmHouse for at least the previous two years (Colorado State University, University of Alberta, and California State Polytechnic University, Pomona) indicated that they wanted to be a part of forming the proposed ag-related women's fraternity or sorority. In 1985, the first chapter of Ceres was chartered.

== Mission and ritual ==
The mission of FarmHouse Fraternity is primarily prescribed within what is known as "The Object" of the fraternity:

“The object of our Fraternity is to promote good fellowship, to encourage studiousness, and to inspire its members in seeking the best in their chosen lines of study, as well as in life. Progress shall mark our every step, the spirit of congeniality shall reign at all times, and every member shall be honest with himself, as with his brothers. Men elected to our membership are considered to be of good moral character, to be high in scholarship, to have the capacity for meeting and making friends, and to give promise of service to their fellow men and to the world. To be and become such may at times require a sacrifice of time, pleasures and comforts.”

The object is recited by members at all chapter rituals and regular chapter meetings.

The motto of FarmHouse is "Builders of Men". The name FarmHouse is an acronym standing for Faith, Ambition, Reverence, Morality, Honesty, Obedience, Unity, Service and Excellence. FarmHouse does not have greek letters and contrary to some rumors, does not have "secret" greek letters.

The ritual of FarmHouse is open and non-secretive. Families of members are often encouraged to attend initiations.

== Membership ==
To become a member of FarmHouse Fraternity, an undergraduate must be extended a bid, or offer of membership, by a chapter of the fraternity at their university. Chapters regularly host recruitment, or rush, events to get to know potential new members, in addition to inviting them over to dinner or a tour of the chapter facility. Every chapter has an officer in charge of recruitment in addition to the responsibility for all chapter members to identify and recruit new members who live by FarmHouse values.

=== New membership ===
New members are men who have accepted a bid extended to them by a chapter of the fraternity. New membership is officially conferred during the course of the Star Ceremony. During the Star Ceremony new members are officially recognized by the chapter as brothers and are given their new member pin. The Star Ceremony is also considered to be the beginning of new member education. New member education is the period before initiation as a chapter member where new members learn about the history and values of the fraternity. New member education is led by an elected officer of the chapter known as the director of New Member Education and lasts a maximum of twelve weeks. Once a new member completes new member education, he is considered for initiation as a chapter member.

=== Chapter membership ===
Chapter members are men who have been initiated as a member of a chapter of the fraternity. Members are elected to membership by a vote of the chapter, commonly referred to as the initiation vote. This vote reflects the new member's completion of new member education and that they are "considered to be of good moral character, to be high in scholarship, to have the capacity for meeting and making friends, and to give promise of service to their fellow men and to the world," as stated in the object. Membership is officially conferred during the Pearl Ceremony, where members are given the standard badge of the fraternity, pledge to uphold the principles and standards of the fraternity, and sign their name in the official chapter membership record, known as the Herd Book.

=== Alumni membership ===
Alumni members are men who have graduated from college or who have requested to leave the chapter prior to graduation but wish to maintain their membership in the fraternity. If a man wishes to obtain early alumni status prior to graduation, he may be granted it upon approval of the chapter, by two-thirds vote, and by the international executive director. Alumni membership is officially conferred in the Ruby Ceremony and is considered to be the end of a member's chapter membership. Upon becoming an alumni member, the man automatically becomes a member of the alumni association affiliated with his previous chapter, and if he moves to another state, will have dual affiliation with the alumni association within that state.

=== Associate membership ===
Associate members are men who having demonstrated the qualities of a FarmHouse man, shown interest in the fraternity, and having not joined a social fraternity while in college or afterwards, are granted membership in the fraternity. Associate membership is granted by a local chapter, which the man automatically becomes an alumni member of. In cases where no chapter exists, an association may grant alumni membership with the approval of the international executive director. Associate members, just like chapter members, officially receive their membership through observing the Pearl Ceremony.

=== Honorary membership ===
Honorary membership is conferred to men of high character and great professional achievement who embody the ideals of a FarmHouse man. It is usually conferred during a Pearl Ceremony at a biennial conclave chaired by the international president. Honorary members may be nominated by unanimous vote of a chapter, association board, or a special committee on honorary membership appointed by the international president. Upon nomination, the candidate must be unanimously elected by the International Executive Board to receive honorary membership. Honorary members have the full rights of any alumni member of the fraternity.

== Awards ==
FarmHouse recognizes the outstanding contributions of both members and non-members of the fraternity.

The Master Builder of Men award is the highest honor that the international fraternity can bestow upon an alumni member. The award was created by the National Executive board in 1950. The award is given biennially at each regular conclave of the fraternity. Notable recipients included Cory Gardner (Colorado State '95) in 2018.

The Barnes Award for Outstanding Interfraternalism is given to individuals who have made a significant impact to the large fraternal movement. The award was created by the FarmHouse International Executive Board in 2012. It is not necessarily given to a member of FarmHouse but rather to those who have contributed to the larger sorority and fraternity community.

== Controversies ==
In 2014, the FarmHouse chapter at the University of Nebraska–Lincoln was suspended after the alcohol related death of an 18-year-old freshman. Four FarmHouse members, including the chapter vice president, were brought up on felony procurement charges. The chapter is now reinstated. The death prompted State Senator Adam Morfeld to introduce a Good Samaritan law providing limited immunity to underage students who call for help in alcohol-related emergencies.

In October 2021, the FarmHouse chapter at the University of Kentucky contacted campus police "regarding reports of an unresponsive student." The student, later identified as Thomas "Lofton" Hazelwood, was taken to UK Albert B. Chandler Hospital in Lexington, Kentucky, where he was pronounced dead. A statement from the Fayette County Coroner said the 18-year-old's cause of death was "presumed alcohol toxicity." On December 22, 2021, the fraternity suspended the charter of the University of Kentucky chapter and issued a no-contact order prohibiting current members of the chapter from any contact with FarmHouse for a period of seven years.

== See also ==
- List of social fraternities
