= St. Anthony Hall =

American coed collegiate fraternity

- ΔΨ
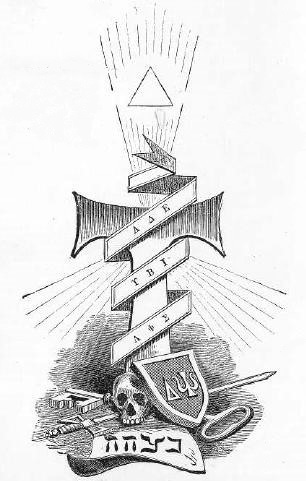
- From University of Pennsylvania Record, 1873
- Founded: January 17, 1847; 179 years ago Columbia University
- Type: Literary
- Affiliation: Independent
- Former affiliation: NIC
- Status: Active
- Scope: National (United States)
- Member badge
- Colors: Azure blue Old gold
- Patron saint: Anthony the Great
- Publication: The Review
- Philanthropy: St. Anthony Educational Foundation, Inc.
- Chapters: 10 active, 19 lifetime
- Members: 530+ active 30,000+ lifetime
- Nickname: 48; The Hall; The Number Six Club; The Order of St. Anthony; St. Anthony Club; St. A's
- Headquarters: 1417 Shelby Street; Indianapolis, Indiana 46203; United States
- Website: www.stanthonyhall.org

St. Anthony Hall or the Fraternity of Delta Psi is an American fraternity and literary society. Its first chapter was founded at Columbia University on January 17, 1847, the feast day of Saint Anthony the Great. The fraternity is a non–religious, nonsectarian organization. In 1879, William Raimond Baird's American College Fraternities characterized the fraternity as having "the reputation of being the most secret of all the college societies." A 2015 writer for Vanity Fair says the fraternity is "a cross between Skull and Bones and a Princeton eating club, with a large heaping of Society and more than a dash of Animal House." Nearly all chapters of St. Anthony Hall are coed.

References to St. Anthony Hall have appeared in the works of F. Scott Fitzgerald, John O'Hara, and Tom Wolfe.

== History ==
According to Baird's Manual, the Alpha chapter of the Fraternity of Delta Psi was founded at Columbia University on January 17, 1847 by John Hone Anthon, Sam. F. Barger, Charles Arms Budd, and William Myn Van Wagener. In The Review magazine, the fraternity says Anthon was a founder and the first leader of the fraternity. (He would later serve as grand master, i.e. president, of Freemasons in New York, for the term 1870-71.) Another source says Delta Psi was started by the fifteen-year-old Edward Forbes Travis who came to Columbia University from England "with an odd fascination for St. Anthony the Great, the gnarled fourth-century mystic." In this scenario, Travis shared "certain rituals" with a Charles Arms Budd on the saint's feast day, creating "a sacred bond that was soon extended to others."

According to its national website, Delta Psi was founded on the feast day of Saint Anthony the Great as a "fraternity dedicated to the love of education and the well-being of its members." It is a non–religious, nonsectarian organization. The fraternity developed "a literary flavor: members would spend hours reading essays to one another for general critique or amusement." By 1853, it was holding an Annual Literary Festival and Dinner. It also held evenings featuring orators and poets, often publishing the poems or speeches.

A Beta chapter was formed at New York University on January 17, 1847. However Beta was short-lived; the Columbia College's Record lists the New York University founders alongside its students. In 1879, Baird's listed seventeen chapters opening throughout the Northeast and South during the mid-19th-century.

During the Civil War, formal contact ended between the Northern and Southern chapters, and all of the Southern chapters closed. In fact, 25% of the fraternity's membership died in the Civil War, with 90 of the 109 deaths coming from the Southern chapters. In December 1865, the fraternity held its annual convention in New York City. The New York Times reported, "Attendance from all the Northern chapters was large, and measures were taken to give the most cordial assistance in response to applications for the rehabilitation of the Southern chapters in such of their colleges are again in operation."

Three of the Southern chapters resumed operations: the University of Virginia, the University of Mississippi, and Washington and Lee. In April 1867, eleven members of the Williams College chapter commissioned a life-sized portrait of a fallen brother; the portrait was displayed at the Schwabe Gallery of Fallen Heroes in Boston, along with the portraits of four other Delta Psi brothers. Members from many Southern chapters attended a commemorative dinner in New York City in December 1871.

In 1894, Yale's Sigma chapter built a dormitory and named it St. Anthony Hall, apparently the first use of that name. The Fraternity of Delta Psi also became known as the Order of St. Anthony and St. Anthony Hall.

Following the respective traditions of each chapter, St. Anthony Hall is now self-described and referred to on its various campuses as a fraternity or coed fraternity, a secret society or literary society, or a private club. A former Yale chapter president said, "Chapters have a range of degrees of secrecy." In 2006, a Yale member said, "Our secret aspects are truly secret, and our non-secret aspects are truly non–secret."

== Symbols ==
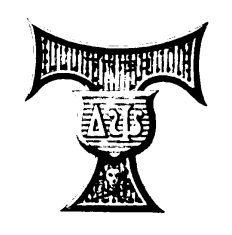
Fraternity of Delta Psi badge, from Baird's Manual, 1883 edition

The 1879 edition of Baird's Manual describes the fraternity's badge as a "Saint Anthony's cross, with curved sides. The cross bears a shield in blue enamel displaying the letters "ΔΨ". On the bar of the cross are engraved four Hebrew letters, and beneath the shield the skull and bones." The badge was designed by fraternity member Henry Steel Olcott in 1850.

The 1873 University of Pennsylvania yearbook illustration (see infobox above) shows a tau cross or Saint Anthony's cross, a flat-topped shield with the letters "ΔΨ", a skull, a sword, a key, a floating triangle, and four Hebrew letters. The sword and the key are crossed, with the skull on top.

In 1860 when the Civil War seemed inevitable, fraternal medallions were made for the brothers to attach to their uniforms so they would be recognized as a member of Delta Psi on the battlefield. A photograph of a medallion in the fraternity's archives shows a round, gold coin with a skull as its central figure. Beneath the skull are a crossed sword and key. Encircling the outer edge of the medallion are a list of each chapter's Greek letter and the foundation date.

== Chapters ==
Following are the chapters of St. Anthony Hall, with active chapters indicated in bold and inactive chapters in italics.

| Name | Charter date and range | Institution | Location | Gender | Housing | Status | Ref. |
|---|---|---|---|---|---|---|---|
| **Alpha** | January 17, 1847 | Columbia University | New York, New York | Coed | Residential, off-campus | Active | |
| Beta (Prime) | January 17, 1847 – April 19, 1853 | New York University | New York, New York | Male | | Moved, Reissued | (Note: Members all transferred to Columbia University and joined the chapter there.) |
| Gamma | 1848–1850 | Rutgers College | New Brunswick, New Jersey | Male | | Inactive | |
| Delta (Prime) | November 28, 1849 – December 27, 1854 | Burlington College | Burlington, New Jersey | Male | | Moved | (Note: Burlington College of New Jersey operated from 1846 to 1881. The Delta chapter of ΔΨ appears to have been the only fraternity established on the Burlington campus. That chapter moved to UPenn in 1854.) |
| Epsilon | October 17, 1850 – July 23, 2023 | Trinity College | Hartford, Connecticut | Coed | Residential, on campus | Inactive | (Note: Chapter was suspended for hazing through June 30, 2026.) |
| Eta | 1850–1861 | South Carolina College | Columbia, South Carolina | Male | | Inactive | |
| **Theta** | 1851–1852, 1986 | Princeton University | Princeton, New Jersey | Coed | | Active | |
| **Iota** | October 24, 1851 – December 29, 1895; 2010 | University of Rochester | Rochester, New York | Coed | Nonresidential, off-campus | Active | |
| **Kappa** | 1852 – April 19, 1853; 1983 | Brown University | Providence, Rhode Island | Coed | Residential, on campus | Active | |
| Lambda | March 15, 1853 – 1970 | Williams College | Williamstown, Massachusetts | Male | | Inactive | (Note: Chapter was formed from the Zeta chapter of Zeta Psi in 1848.) (Note: The Lambda chapter closed in 1970 when Williams College banned Greek organizations. For years following its closure, there were reports of the chapter either operating underground or having reformed as a different off-campus group. These reports have never been confirmed by St. Anthony Hall or the Lambda alumni association.) |
| Sigma (Prime) | October 22, 1853 – 1861 | Randolph-Macon College | Boydton, Virginia | Male | | Inactive, Reissued | |
| **Delta** | December 27, 1854 | University of Pennsylvania | Philadelphia, Pennsylvania | Male | Residential, on campus | Active | |
| **Xi** | November 20, 1854 – 1863; November 2, 1926 | University of North Carolina at Chapel Hill | Chapel Hill, North Carolina | Coed | Residential, off-campus | Active | |
| **Phi** | June 2, 1855–1861; 1865 – February 21, 1912; May 17, 1926 | University of Mississippi | Oxford, Mississippi | Male | Residential, on campus | Active | (Note: Active operations were suspended 1861-1865, reorganized in 1865. Legislative act February 21, 1912 extinguished all fraternities at U of M) |
| Psi | 1858–1861 | Cumberland University | Lebanon, Tennessee | Male | | Inactive | |
| **Upsilon** | April 20, 1860 – 1861; 1866 | University of Virginia | Charlottesville, Virginia | Male | Residential, on campus | Active | (Note: Active operations suspended from 1861-1866, reorganized in 1866) |
| **Sigma** | December 19, 1868 | Yale University | New Haven, Connecticut | Coed | Nonresidential, on campus | Active | (Note: The Yale chapter began at Sheffield Scientific School, part of Yale College.) |
| Beta | November 27, 1869 – December 29, 1888 | Washington and Lee University | Lexington, Virginia | Male | | Inactive | |
| **Tau** | April 6, 1889 | Massachusetts Institute of Technology | Cambridge, Massachusetts | Coed | Residential, off-campus. | Active | (Note: The Tau chapter is known as Number 6 Club on the MIT campus.) |

There have been rumors that the Lambda chapter operates underground; Williams College banned all fraternities in the 1960s, phasing them out by 1970. In 2003, The Williams Record reported that the fraternity began operating as the coed Vermont Literary Society as early as 1973. At that time, the Vermont Literary Society was meeting outside of Williamstown at a place in Vermont referred to as "The Barn". The college offered amnesty to any students who came forward; however, none took advantage of the offer. Again in 2020, there were reports that the Vermont Literary Society was still active as the underground Lambda chapter. The Williams Record's investigation noted that Williams College graduates from 2016 were serving on the board of the Lambda chapter's alumni association. However, the paper later reported that the group disbanded in August 2020.

That the now-inactive Delta Psi local fraternity at the University of Vermont (1850–2004) was never affiliated.

== Membership ==
Members of St. Anthony Hall call each other "brother", "sister", or "sibling" according to individual preference. In 1961, the Yale chapter was the first fraternity on campus to admit a person of color. The University of North Carolina chapter was the first fraternity at its campus to admit African-American members in 1967, followed by the University of Mississippi chapter. In recent times, the fraternity's membership has become more multicultural.

In 1969, the Yale chapter was the first to go coed, also becoming the first Yale society to accept women. Additional chapters subsequently turned coed, including Columbia University, MIT in 1969, the University of North Carolina in 1971, and Trinity College in 1985. Other chapters were reestablished as coed including, Brown University in 1983, Princeton University in 1986, and the University of Rochester in 2010. The University of Pennsylvania, the University of Mississippi, and the University of Virginia chapters remain all-male.

In 2016, Town & Country included the Columbia University chapter of St. Anthony Hall in its list of the "six most exclusive clubs of the Ivy League".

== Activities ==
St. Anthony Hall members pursue their literary mandate through different programs at the various chapters. The Brown chapter publishes a literary and visual arts magazine called The Sketchbook and hosts bi-weekly literary readings. The UNC chapter hosts open mic nights, poetry readings, and art shows. The Delta chapter at the University of Pennsylvania hosts an annual lecture series with nationally significant speakers and also organizes a book drive and reading program for a local public school. The MIT chapter hosts a scholarly lecture series, coffee hours, and participates in charitable activities. The Yale chapter sponsors a public series of Sigma Seminars every two to three weeks on literature, poetry, art, and current affairs; a recent speaker was Pap Souleye Fall, a Senegalese–American interdisciplinary and comic artist. The Trinity chapter hosts its annual Clement Lectures. The Columbia chapter hosts writers to discuss their works at least once a semester and also engages in charitable fundraising.

The Trinity chapter endows a St. Anthony Professorship in Art History, several annual prizes for Trinity students, and the annual Martin W. Clement lecture. In 1970 when it went coed, the Yale chapter endowed a scholarship at Yale for women. The Yale chapter also offers the St. Anthony Hall Chase Coggins Fellowship.

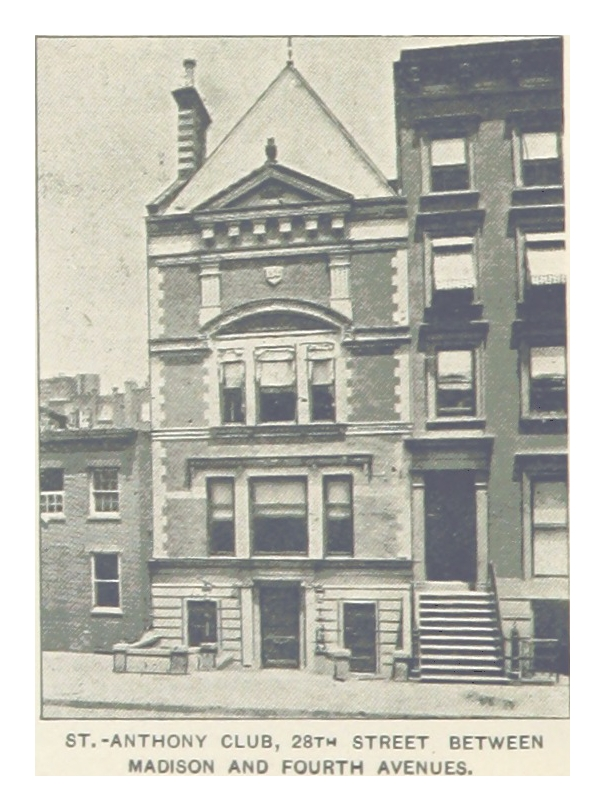
1879 Alpha chapter house and St. Anthony Club of New York

== Chapter houses and buildings ==
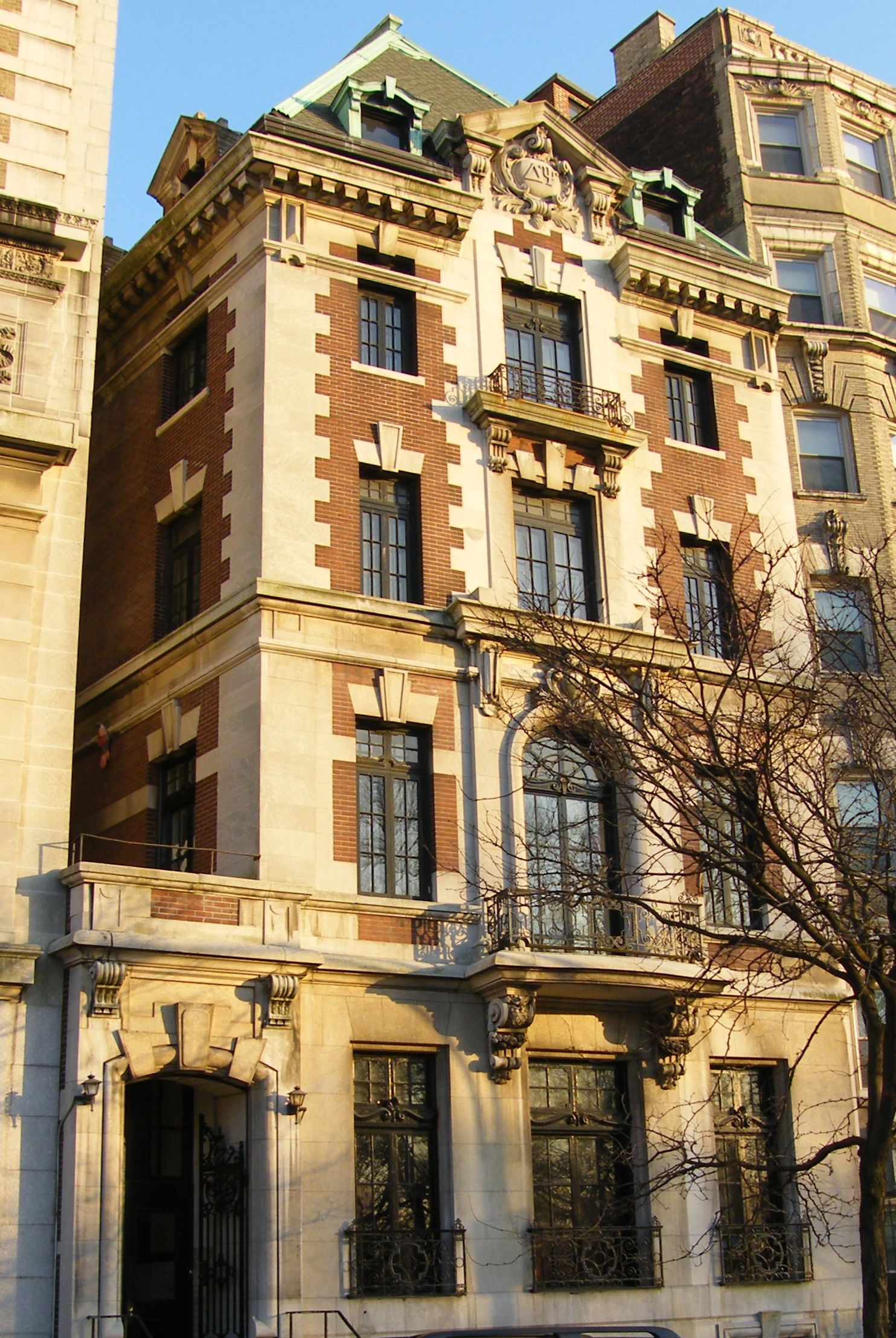
Current Alpha chapter house

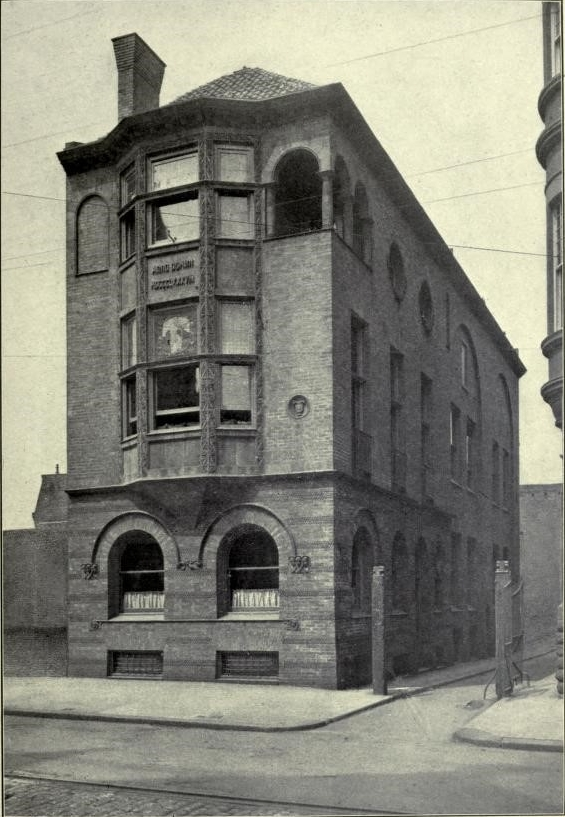
1889 Delta chapter house and St Anthony Club of Philadelphia

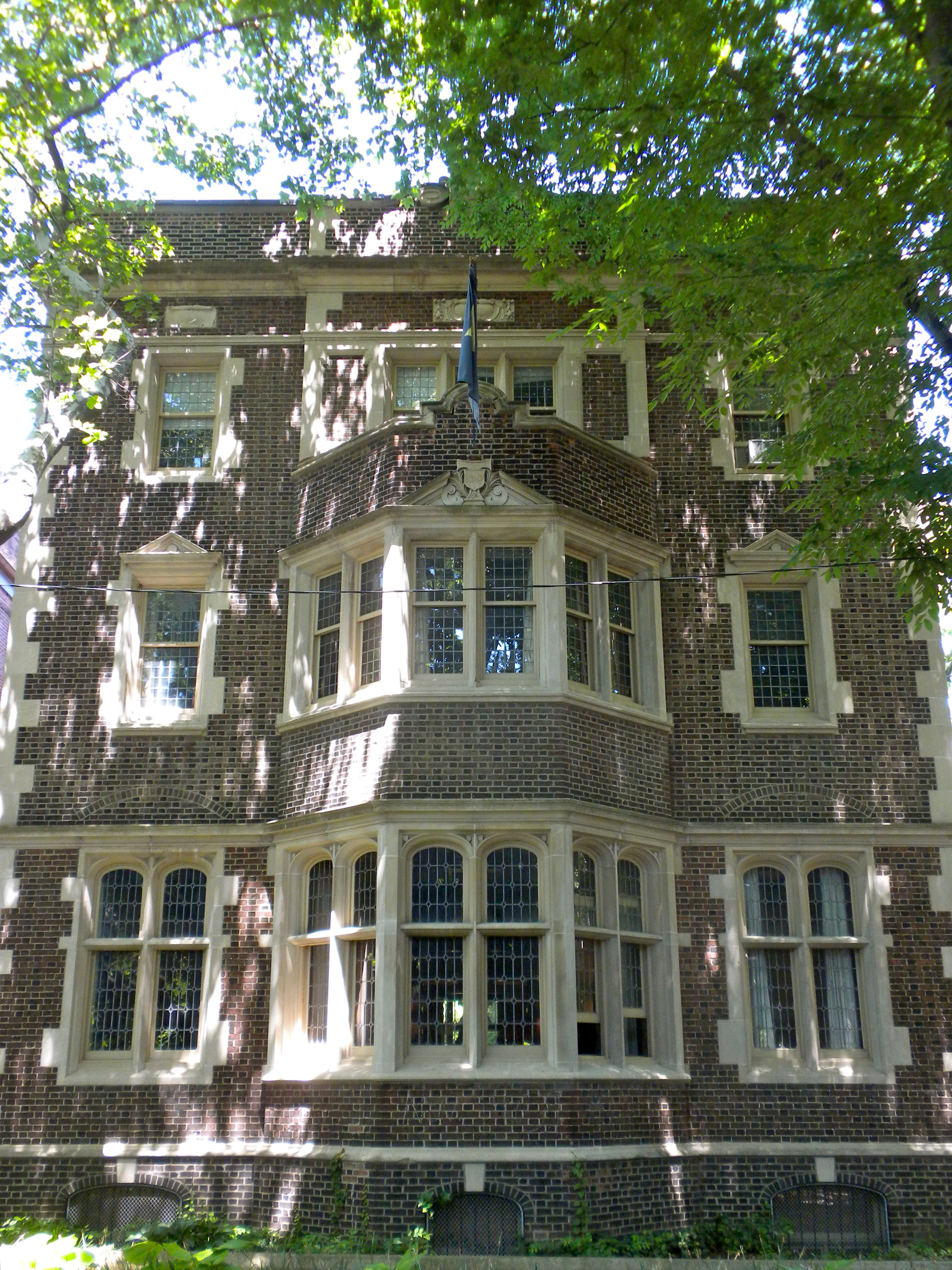
Current Delta chapter house

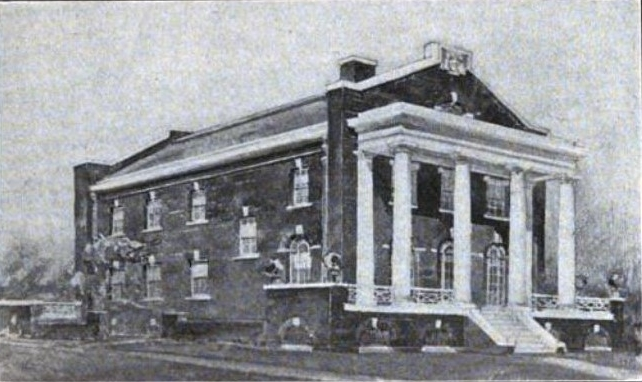
Upsilon chapter house in 1903

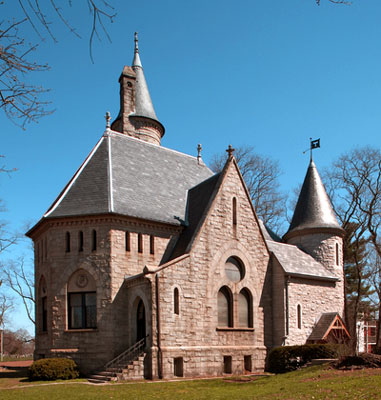
Epsilon chapter house

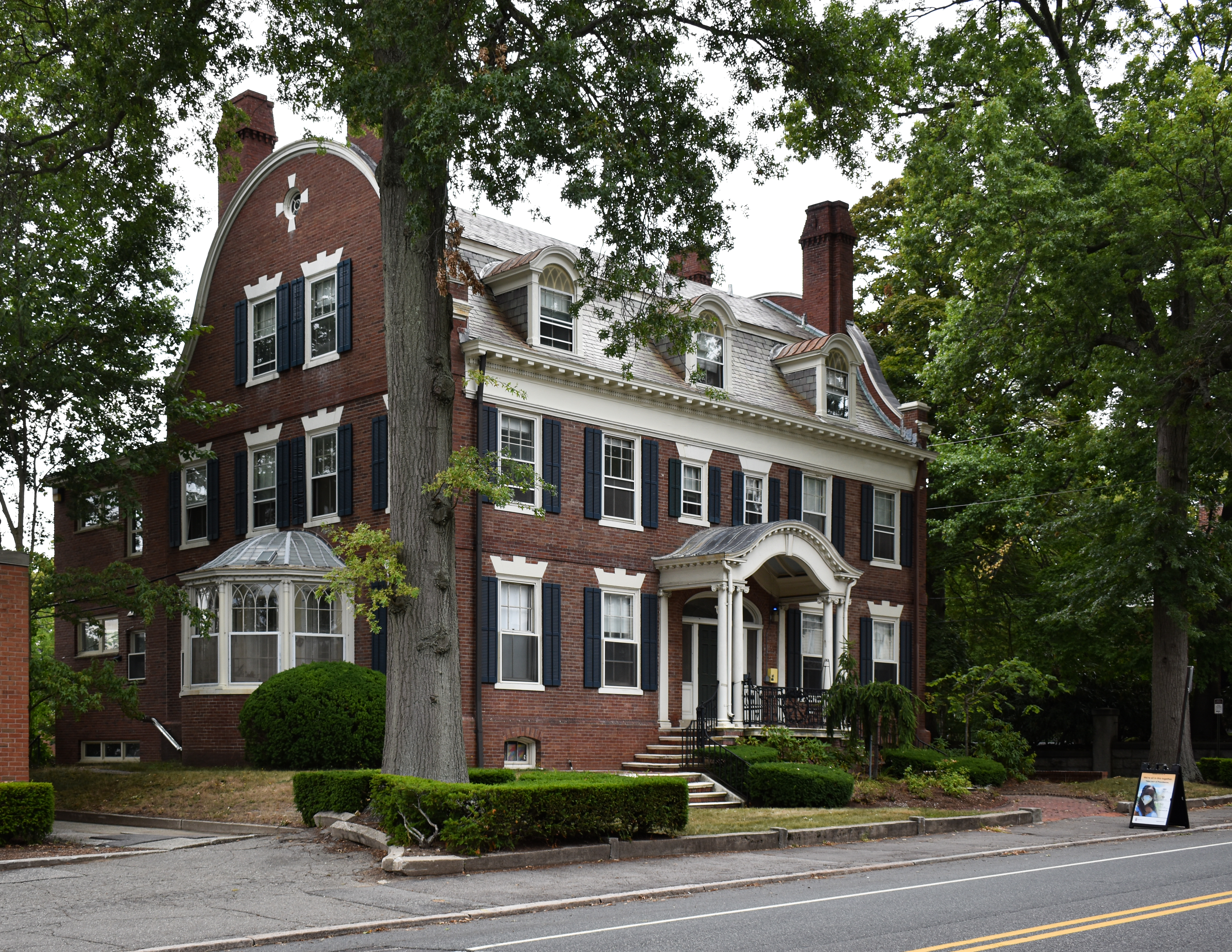
Kappa chapter house

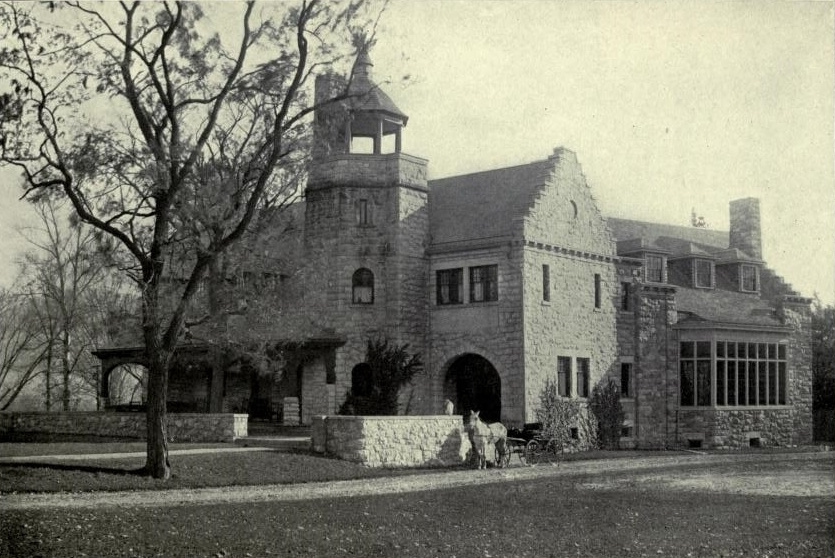
Former Lambda chapter house

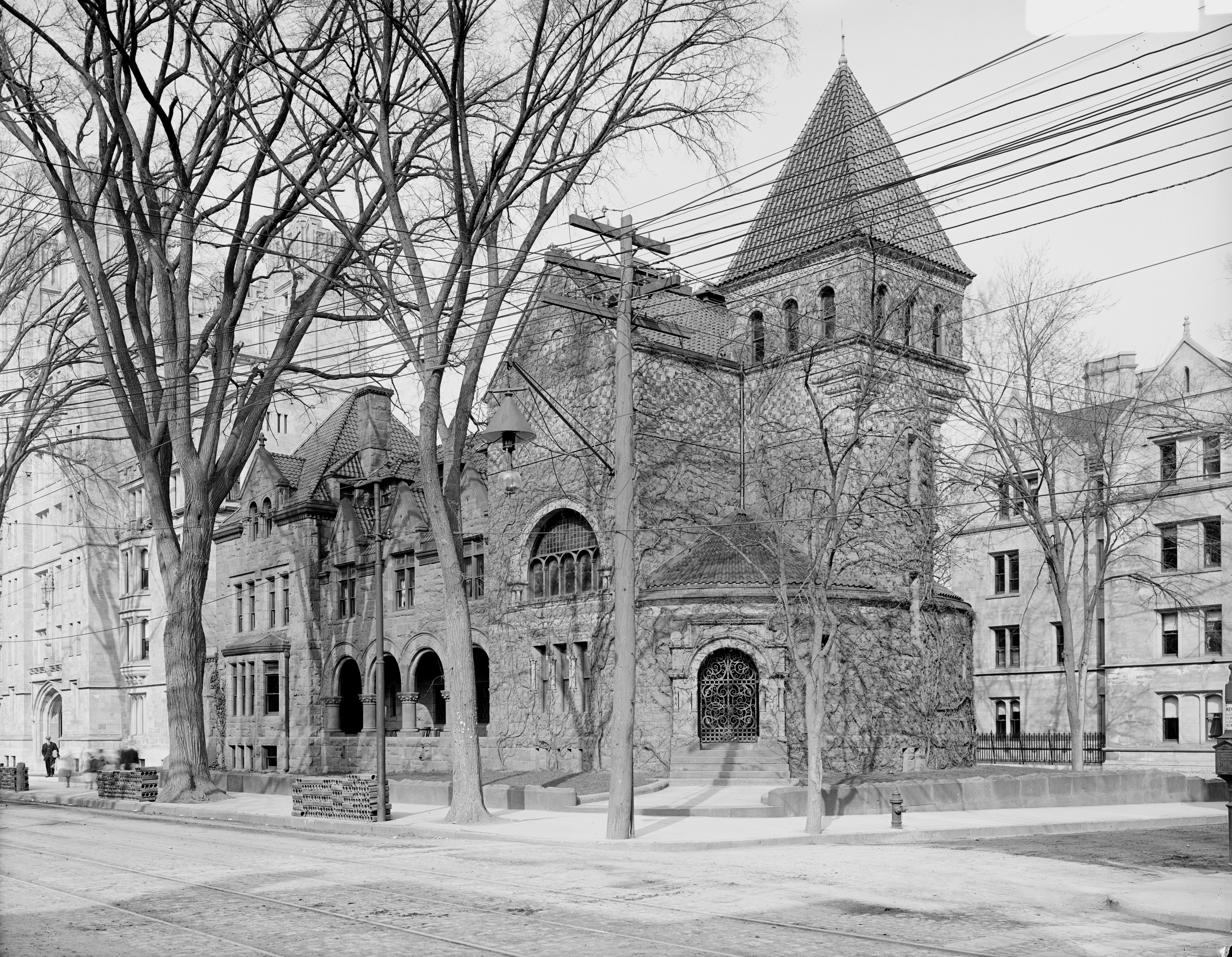
1894 Sigma chapter house and dormitory

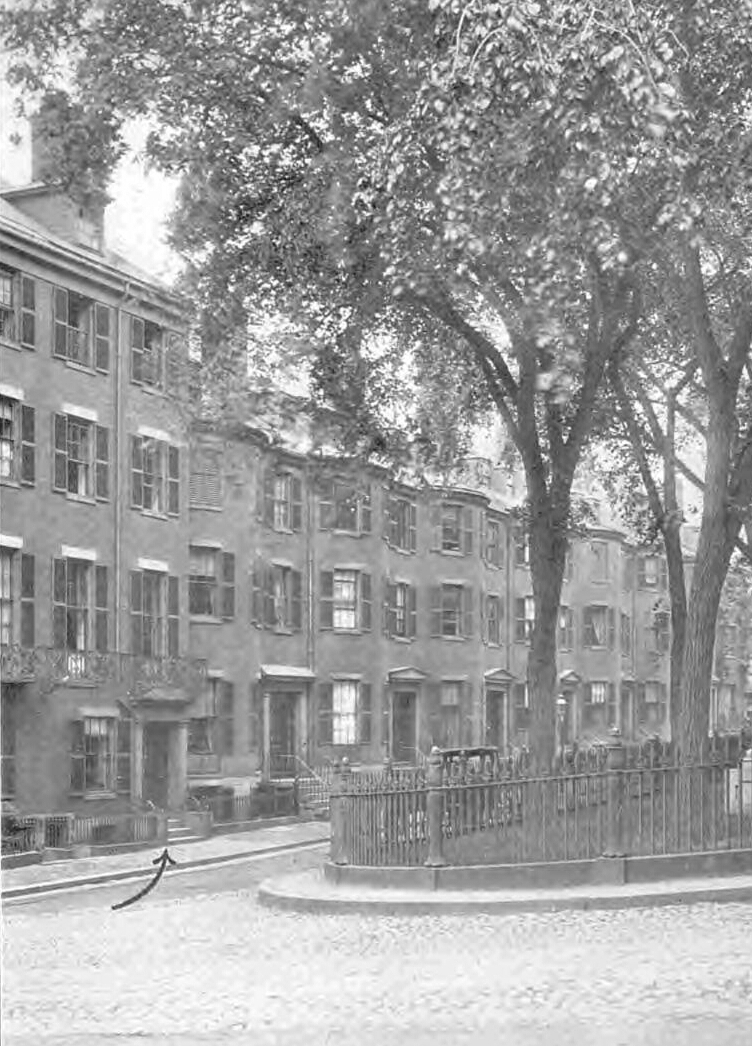
Tau chapter house and St. Anthony Club of Boston, 1912

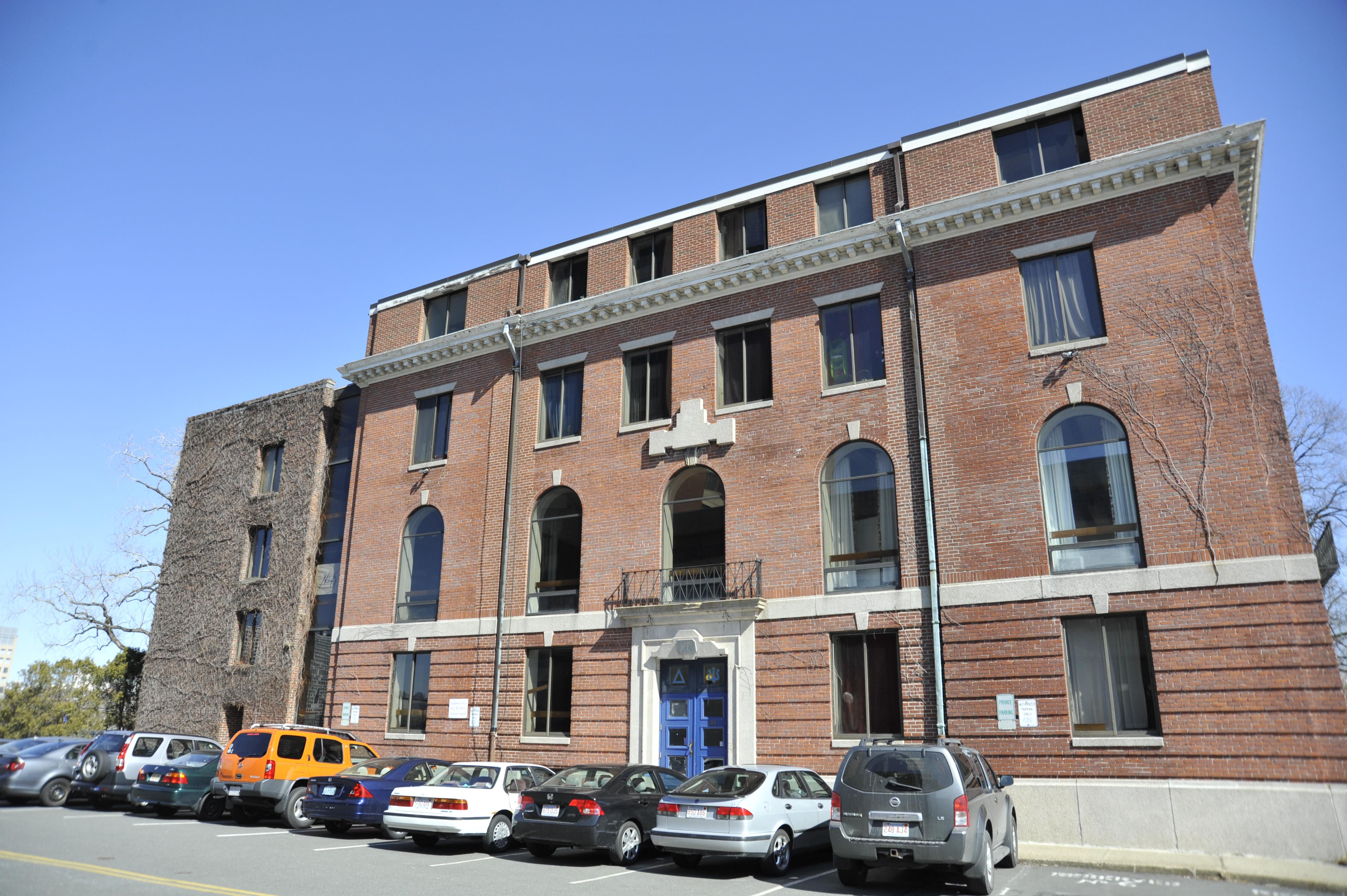
Current Tau chapter house

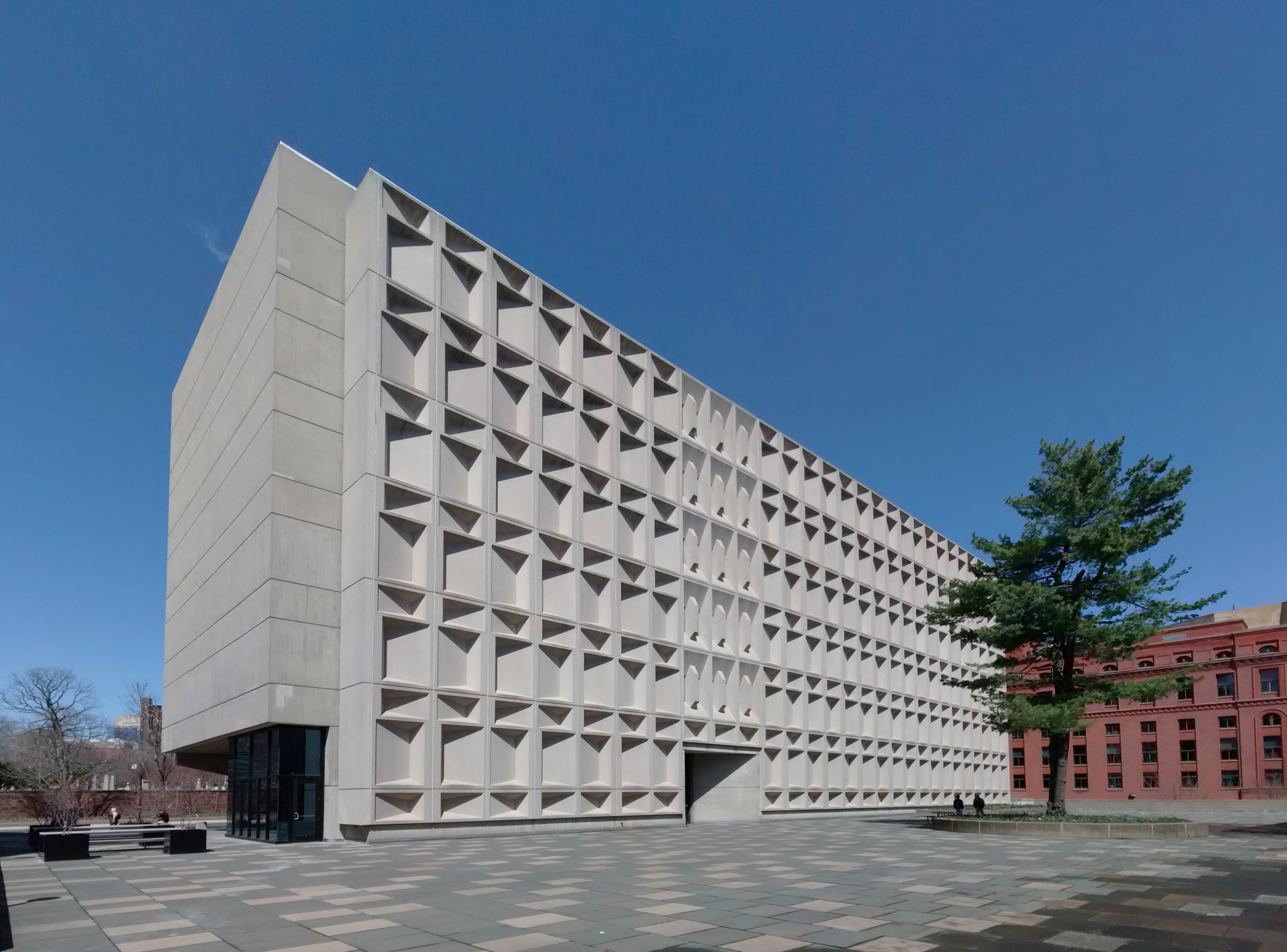
Becton Center

Former St. Anthony Club of New York

Many of the St. Anthony Hall chapter houses were designed by well-known 19th and early 20th-century architects such as Henry Forbes Bigelow, J. Cleveland Cady, Cope and Stewardson, Wilson Eyre, Heins & LaFarge, Charles C. Haight, Henry Hornbostel, J. Harleston Parker, William Hamilton Russell, and Stanford White.

An 1891 newspaper feature article on American college societies illustrated fifteen chapter houses, including three from Delta Psi—Trinity, Williams, and Yale.

=== Alpha: Columbia University ===
The Alpha chapter originally met at the Simon DeWitt Bloodgood house. In 1879, a new building was constructed at 29 East 28th Street for the Alpha chapter and its alumni group, the St. Anthony Club of New York. According to the New-York Tribune, it was "the first of the Greek letter societies to establish in New York a club which presents many of the features of the other social clubs in the city." The Alpha chapter's Renaissance-inspired lodge in red and yellow brick was designed by William Hamilton Russell, a member of St. Anthony Hall and an architect with the firm of James Renwick, Jr. The Hartford Courant wrote, "The decorations of the interior are most elaborate, and altogether it is said to be one of the most beautiful college secret society buildings in the country."

In 1885, a small addition was added to the back of the building. The St. Louis Globe–Democrat wrote, "The lodge room on the Delta Psi fraternity in New York is magnificently furnished in Egyptian designs especially imported from Thebes for this purpose, at the cost of thousands of dollars..." In 1990, the New York Times wrote, "Old photographs show...the figure of an owl on the peaked [pyramid] roof and a plaque with the Greek letters Delta Psi over the windowless chapter room." Later alterations were made by J.A. Moore in 1899 and 1918, including adding 1.5 stories that replaced the original pyramid roof; the stone shield remains between the fourth-floor windows.

In 1895, Columbia University moved its campus north of the city to Morningside Heights. To be closer to the new campus, the Alpha chapter purchased land on 434 Riverside Drive on March 23, 1897. To design a new chapter house, they hired Henry Hornbostel and George Carnegie Palmer (a member of St. Anthony Hall) of the firm of Wood, Palmer and Hornbostel. The architects' plans were filed with the city on August 26, 1898, and the building was completed in 1898. The resulting five-story plus basement structure is a combination of Beaux Arts and French Renaissance revival styles. It is constructed of red brick, is trimmed liberally in limestone, and has dormers covered in copper. At the top of the building is carved relief of the Greek letters ΔΨ. The interior included reception rooms, a billiard room, a dining room, a library, and bedrooms for twenty members. In 1996, it was added to the National Register of Historic Places as Delta Psi, Alpha chapter. The chapter house is also a contributing building to the Broadway-Riverside Drive National Register Historic District.

=== Delta: University of Pennsylvania ===
Regarded as the first purpose-built fraternity house on the University of Pennsylvania campus, the original Delta Psi house was a Florentine or Renaissance Revival style design by Wilson Eyre. It is located at 32 South 22nd Street, across the Schuykill from Penn's West Philadelphia campus. It opened in January 1889 and also housed the St. Anthony Club of Philadelphia. It served the fraternity from 1889 to 1908.

In 1907, Cope and Stewardson designed the chapter's next house in the Academic Gothic style. Saint Anthony is depicted in a stained glass window in the stairway landing of the first floor; as seen in the photo to the right, a stone tau cross is also above the second-story windows on the exterior. This brick and limestone three-story house was added to National Register of Historic Places in 2005 as St. Anthony Hall House. This chapter house is described and pictured in George E. Nitzsche's University of Pennsylvania: Its History, Traditions, Buildings, and Memorials: Also a Brief Guide to Philadelphia.

=== Upsilon: University of Virginia ===
The University of Virginia's brick chapter house with two-story tall columns and a spacious portico was the third fraternity house constructed on Grounds—although it was the first with residential use in mind. Built in 1902, this Colonial Revival or Jeffersonian style house is "beautifully situated on 'Page Hill'" and blends well with the campus architecture designed by Thomas Jefferson. The Upsilon chapter house was designed by J. Harleston Parker, founder of the Harleston Parker Medal. It cost $20,000 (equivalent to $744,231 in 2023) to build. The interior was "furnished with taste throughout", and included ten bedrooms, a library, a billiard room, and a 20 by 30 feet (6.1 by 9.1 m) reception room that was paneled in oak. There was also electric lighting, running hot and cold water, and steam heat. The house is included The Architecture of Jefferson Country: Charlottesville and Albemarle County, Virginia" by K. Edward Lay.

=== Epsilon: Trinity College ===
A gift of fraternity member and recent graduate Robert Habersham Coleman, the granite lodge of the Trinity College chapter was designed in the High Victorian Gothic-style by J. Cleaveland Cady in 1878. Cady was a member of Trinity's Epsilon chapter. This was one of the most expensive fraternity houses in America at the time and was also a "radical departure from the customary tomb-like structures of the secret societies of other campuses". Added in 1985 to the National Register of Historic Places, as Saint Anthony Hall, the Epsilon chapter home is the oldest St. Anthony Hall building still in use by the fraternity. It is also the oldest fraternity house at Trinity and one of the oldest buildings on campus.

=== Kappa: Brown University ===
The Brown University chapter house at 154 Hope Street in Providence, Rhode Island, was designed by Stone, Carpenter & Wilson in the Colonial Revival style in 1895. The house features ogee gables and a conservatory, as well as an addition added in 1961. Originally a private residence for Alice and Robert W. Taft, the brick building was later owned by Bryant University which called it Taft Hall and used it as its administration building from 1947 through 1969. When Brown acquired the building in 1969, it was renamed King House in 1974 in honor of Lida Shaw King, former dean of Pembroke College. Brown provides King House to the Kappa chapter as a residential student program house.

=== Lambda: Williams College ===
The former Williams College chapter house dates from 1886 and was designed by Stanford White of McKim, Mead and White. White had just designed a New York City townhouse for fraternity member Frederick Ferris Thompson, who provided White to create the Lamba chapter house. The chapter house was constructed in of blue freestone and combines early Norman and Old English styles. It has been described as "a witty paraphrase of a Dutch Colonial house, compact in silhouette and terminating in proud stepped gables. But no such Dutch house ever had such an audacious tower, tapered in the fashion of an Egyptian pylon." The interior has "an elaborate interplay of crossbeams on the ceiling combined with heroically oversized fireplaces..."

In 1905, an addition was added to the southwest end that had electricity and included nine bedrooms, a library, four studies, and three bathrooms. However, the addition was destroyed by a fire in May 1926, probably the result of faulty electrical wiring. Architect Roger Bullard and local contractors restored the wing. However, on January 21, 1927, another fire destroyed the new southwest wing, and the dining room ceiling collapsed, blowing out the windows on the first floor. Another addition was added to the south, but does not impact the main view of the house.

Because fraternities were banned at Williams in the 1960s, Lambda chapter sold its building to the college in 1970. The still-named Saint Anthony Hall now houses the college's Center for Developmental Economics. The 17,540 square feet (1,630 m^{2}) building was renovated and refurbished in 1996. It still includes a bronze relief memorial to fraternity member Frederick Ferris Thompson, designed in 1906 by Augustus Saint-Gaudens.

=== Sigma: Yale University ===
The original Sigma chapter house was built in 1879 and no longer exists. This five-story building was said to be "the finest thing of the kind in any university in the country". In 1885, the chapter built a new house, also no longer in existence, that was designed by Harrison W. Lindsley who was a member of the Yale chapter. It was a Richardsonian Romanesque style structure built of red sandstone. In 1894, the chapter started construction of a dormitory building designed by George Lewis Heins and Christopher Grant LaFarge of the firm Heins & LaFarge. Located at 133 College Street, the dormitory housed 26 men and was named St. Anthony Hall—perhaps the first use of that name. It was built of East Haven sandstone to match the nearby chapter house and featured large parlors, a 20 by 30 feet (6.1 by 9.1 m) library filled with books, a porch with carved stone decorations, and servants quarters.

Around 1903, fraternity member Frederick William Vanderbilt commissioned a gift of two limestone residential halls adjacent to the chapter house. These were constructed between 1903 and 1906. Next, Vanderbilt hired Charles C. Haight to create a matching Neo-Gothic style chapter house which was completed in 1913 at 483 College Street. The ornamental iron gates from the second chapter house were re-used at the corner entrance of the new octagonal tower. It is believed that Rafael Guastavino Jr. built the domed ceiling in a basement room called The Crypt; Guastavino previously worked on Biltmore Estate for Vanderbilt's younger brother. The Crypt "has a wonderful sound parabola, where someone standing in one corner can whisper and be heard across the room by someone standing in the opposite corner". The New York Times called it "the most expensive and elaborate secret society building in the United States".

The flanking residential halls are now part of Silliman College; St. Anthony Hall donated them to the university when Yale started a campus residential system in the 1930s.

=== Tau: Massachusetts Institute of Technology ===
The first Tau chapter house was designed by J. P. Fuller and built circa 1834–37 in the Greek Revival style. It was located at 6 Louisburg Square in Boston's Beacon Hill neighborhood. The building also housed the St. Anthony Club of Boston. This address is the origin of the nickname for the Tau chapter—the Number Six Club. The chapter's current multi-stored structure at 428 Memorial Drive was first occupied in 1916. It was designed by Boston architect Henry Forbes Bigelow, an alumnus of the Tau chapter.

=== Related campus buildings ===
Yale chapter member and benefactor Henry Becton donated the Becton Center to Yale. Designed by Marcel Breuer, the Becton Center opened in 1970. Located at 15 Prospect Street in New Haven, the building's most distinctive feature is an arcade of monumental tau cross-shaped concrete columns.

=== St. Anthony Club of New York ===
Designed by architect S. E. Gage, the former St. Anthony Club of New York was located at 16 East 64th Street in New York City. Originally built between 1878 and 1879, Gage redesigned the building between 1902 and 1904 in the Neo-Federal style. The five-story brownstone includes limestone columns, a detailed, wrought-iron front door and gate, a limestone and marble entry foyer, and a bronze and wrought-iron main staircase. In addition, the townhouse boasted ornate moldings, high ceilings, skylights, oak Versailles parquet floors, and six wood-burning fireplaces. The building is on a historically distinguished residential street and is included in the walking tour of 64th Street.

Beginning in 1951, St. Anthony Hall used this building as an alumni city club and as headquarters for its national offices; the fraternity (Delta Psi, Inc.) purchased the building in 1952. In the early 1970s, the Barnard College Club leased space in the St. Anthony Club building. The fraternity closed its club and sold the building in 1990; the former club is now a private residence.

== Alumni groups ==
=== Foundations ===
The St. Anthony Educational Foundation Inc. is a charitable entity that supports the educational and cultural programs and activities of the fraternity through grants and scholarships to its chapters.

=== Graduate organizations ===
St. Anthony Hall has several incorporated graduate chapter associations that exist to support its chapters and/or buildings. The first such group was the Anthony Trust Association, which was chartered in Connecticut in 1874 and operates as a national nonprofit organization. Known graduate chapters include:

| Chapter | Associated collegiate chapter | Ref. |
|---|---|---|
| 1853 Foundation, aka the Lambda Foundation | Lambda | |
| Anthony Trust Association | National | |
| Anthony Trust Association of New Haven | Sigma | |
| Delta Alumni Association, aka Delta Psi Fraternity Delta Chapter | Delta | |
| St. Anthony 1907 Foundation | Delta | |
| St. Anthony Association of Boston | Tau | |
| St. Anthony Association of North Carolina Inc., also known as St. Anthony Association | Xi | |
| St. Anthony Association of Virginia | Upsilon | |
| St. Anthony Club of Mississippi | Phi | |
| St. Anthony Hall of New York, Inc. | Alpha | |
| St. Anthony Trust of Hartford Inc. | Epsilon | |
| St. Anthony Trust of Rhode Island | Kappa | |

=== Clubs and area organizations ===
Historically, there were several alumni social clubs associated with the fraternity—the 1890 edition of Baird's Manual credits the Delta Psi with being "a pioneer in the development of this form of social life". These clubs usually adopted the name St. Anthony Club because the fraternity's badge was a St. Anthony's cross.

==== St. Anthony Club of New York ====
Founded in 1879, the St. Anthony Club of New York was the first and longest-running of these establishments. It was also the first fraternity-related club in New York City. In 1883, it was housed at 29 East 28th Street in a building it shared with the undergraduates of the Columbia chapter.

In 1885, the club added an addition to the rear of the building, and The New York Times gave its readers a rare peek inside the club:

The front room is a parlor with tables for cards. In cases on the mantlepiece are "Goodwood Cups," trophies of which the club is justly proud. The furniture and fittings here are cherry, with harmonious upholstery and walls. Several fine prints are to be seen, including views of buildings of the Delta Psi at Yale, Trinity, and other colleges. A passageway, richly decorated in the baronial style of the twelfth century, leads from the office past the buffet, in a crypt under the stairs, to a large room, which, with a noble open fireplace, offers, in cosy [sic] leather cushions, in stalls in the corners and more spacious chairs, a quiet retreat. The fantastic and unique latticework of the windows attracts attention, with the bold and artistic studding of the ceiling, and ornate chandeliers especially manufactured emit their jets of gas from imitation candles...This is the smoking and lounging room.

The club also included a billiard room with high oak wainscotting and walls of a blueish-green with hints of gold, an entire floor dedicated to its library, and a national fraternity office decorated with illustrations of the temptations of St. Anthony. It was also noted that the membership and dues were low, "so as to prevent no one who is eligible from joining". Membership was limited to alumni of the Delta Psi fraternity, and no others could gain entry. In 1893, St. Anthony Hall was referred to by the New-York Tribune as "the most exclusive organization of the kind in the United States".

On July 4, 1912, the St. Anthony Club purchased the house of Edith S. Logan, widow of John A. Logan, located at 17 West 56th Street in New York City. The club used its 1879 Alpha chapter house as a partial payment to Logan. In 1929, the club purchased the Junior League's five-story clubhouse at 133–35 61st Street, selling 17 West 56th Street in 1931. In 1936, the club and the fraternity's office were jointly housed in a penthouse of the Berkshire Hotel at 21 East 52nd Street. The club relocated to an apartment at 270 Park Avenue in 1944. However, by the early 1980s, the club was located in a brownstone at 16 East 64th Street and was no longer financially sustainable. With the city's property boom, by 1988 the brownstone was worth $3.5 million versus $1 million in 1984. The fraternity decided to close the club and liquidate the asset to free funds for other projects. In 1989, the fraternity borrowed money to fix structural problems and other issues with the building. The St Anthony Club of New York building sold in 1990 for $3,250,000 (equivalent to $8,009,106 in 2023), although the net to the organization was significantly less because of debts, stockholder payouts, and taxes.

==== Other historic clubs ====
Known as the St. Andrews Club, the alumni group in Detroit, Michigan, started meeting annually in 1883. The St. Anthony Club in Philadelphia was established sometime before 1888 when moved into a new building with the undergraduate chapter. There was also a St. Anthony Club in Rochester, New York before 1890. The St. Anthony Club in Boston was established before 1898 and shared a building in Beacon Hill with the undergraduate chapter at MIT. The St. Anthony Club of the Northwest was organized in 1890 after having semi-annual dinner gatherings. In 1904, the St. Anthony Club of Bar Harbor, Maine gathered for its annual dinner. There was also a St. Anthony Club of Bermuda.

==== Modern clubs ====
Known modern alumni social groups include the Paris St. Anthony Hall Association, the St. Anthony Association of New Jersey, the St. Anthony Association of Nova Scotia, the St. Anthony Association of Rhode Island, the St. Anthony Association of Southern Arizona, the St. Anthony Association of Washington, D.C., and the St. Anthony Club of Philadelphia.

== Notable members ==
As 2025, St. Anthony Hall has 530 undergraduate members and more than 9,800 living members in nearly 100 countries. Some notable members include Nobel Prize in Physics recipient Andrea M. Ghez; Jonathan Yardley, Pulitzer Prize winning book critic with the Washington Post; Charles Kuralt, journalist who received winner of twelve Emmy Awards and two Peabody Awards; Charles Edison; Governor of New Jersey and U.S. Secretary of the Navy; Alex Gibney, Oscar and Emmy winning film director and producer; Jeff MacNelly, three-time Pulitzer Prize–winning editorial cartoonist and creator of the comic strip Shoe; George Herbert Walker IV, managing director of Lehman Brothers; and John Cromwell Bell Jr., chief justice of the Supreme Court of Pennsylvania and Governor of Pennsylvania.

== In popular culture ==
- The exclusive Hamilton House secret society from the television show Gossip Girl was based on St. Anthony Hall's Columbia chapter. However, when the character Van der Woodsen is denied admission to Hamilton House, she says, "It’s fine, I joined St. A’s instead."
- The "St. Ray's" fraternity in Tom Wolfe's I Am Charlotte Simmons is modeled after the University of Pennsylvania chapter where Wolfe attended a cocktail party in 2001 while conducting research for the book.
- The cover art of rock band Vampire Weekend's first album is of the Columbia chapter's ballroom chandelier, taken at one of the band's early shows.
- In June 1971, Vogue magazine featured the newly coed University of North Carolina chapter in an article called "Vogue's Eye View on Girl Power".
- The society tabloid Gawker said "In the constellation of collegiate societies—fraternities, sororities, eating clubs, final clubs, and the like—few are more exclusive, and WASPy, as St. Anthony Hall, or St. A's as it is commonly known..."
- The Official Preppy Handbook says, "St. A's appeals to the 'cool element' of Preppies at Yale; this means Preppies who don't iron their shirts. It isn't rowdy: parties there conform to the intellectual self-image Yalies hold dear."
- The University of Mississippi chapter house is said to be haunted by a brother, Jim Bridges, who died in a car wreck on the way back from a LSU football game in 1964.
- During a fellowship on campus in December 1967, California Governor Ronald Reagan was filmed by public television informally debating Yale students at St. Anthony Hall. Nancy Reagan was also present, as the Yalies quiz the governor on Vietnam and various social justice issues.
- Mama Dip (Mildred Cotton Council), an icon of Southern cooking who was a guest at the White House, once was the cook at the University of North Carolina chapter.
- During the Klondike Gold Rush in 1897, Jack London befriend two mining engineers who were members of the Yale chapter—Marshall Latham Bond and Louis Whitford Bond. They designated their cabin a chapter house, and let London camp by it for six weeks. Buck, the canine protagonist of London's Call of the Wild, was inspired by the Bond brothers' dog. The Bond's father, Judge Hiram Bond from California, is lightly fictionalized in Call of the Wild as Judge Miller.
- John O'Hara, in his 1960 novel Ourselves to Know, uses St. Anthony Hall membership in the characterizations of the protagonists:
  - "'Did you join a fraternity at Penn?' I said. 'Yes I did. St Anthony–Delta Psi. But I think they were sorry that they invited me.' ...I happened to know, because I had seen it, that he had a Delta Psi Tea Company gold charm on his watch chain, but the reason he did not show it was one of delicacy; in 1908 they had not accepted his resignation but he kept the insigne hidden..."
  - "He and Robert quickly looked at each other's watch-chain and the Delta Psi charm and smiled."
- F. Scott Fitzgerald refers to the Pump and Slipper, an annual party at the Yale chapter since 1911, in several of his short stories:
  - "May Day" in Tales of the Jazz Age: "'My name's Dean, Philip Dean,' he said cheerfully. 'You don't remember me, I know, but you used to come up to New Haven with a fellow I roomed with senior year, Gordon Sterrett.' Edith looked up quickly. 'Yes, I went up with him twice—to the Pump and Slipper and the Junior prom.'"
  - "Bernice Bobs Her Hair": "Warren was nineteen and rather pitying with those of his friends who hadn't gone East to college. But, like most boys, he bragged tremendously about the girls of his city when he was away from it. There was Genevieve Ormonde, who regularly made the rounds of dances, house-parties, and football games at Princeton, Yale, Williams, and Cornell; there was black-eyed Roberta Dillon, who was quite as famous to her generation as Hiram Johnson or Ty Cobb; and, of course, there was Marjorie Harvey, who besides having a fairylike face and a dazzling, bewildering tongue was already justly celebrated for having turned five cart-wheels in succession during the last pump-and-slipper dance at New Haven."
  - "A Short Trip Home", Saturday Evening Post, January 17, 1927: "There was talk of the Pump and Slipper dance at New Haven and the Princeton Prom, and then, in various moods, we four left and separated quickly outside."

== Scandals and member misconduct ==
- In 1889, a death was reported in a hazing incident at the Yale chapter. According to the news report, a pledge was placed in a coffin and lowered outside a window with a rope. When the coffin was pulled up, the pledge, who was of a "nervous temperament", was found dead.
- In 1896, the fraternity revoked the charter of the University of Rochester Iota chapter without warning. At the time, Iota had existed for 44 years, had 56 members in good academic standing, owned a chapter house with a mortgage balance of just $3,000 (equivalent to $116,100 in 2023), and had an active alumni club. The Rochester Democrat and Chronicle concluded that the issue was with the college itself, rather than Iota chapter, writing, "The fraternity is comparably small and very exclusive and desires to remain so...Rochester is not sufficiently aristocratic". The Iota chapter did not reopen until 2010.
- In 1901, there was a kidnapping attempt of member R. H. Rogers of the Williams chapter. He was rescued from the kidnapper's carriage by another student who had a revolver.
- On July 11, 1915, Daniel Leroy Dresser committed suicide at the Columbia chapter house over financial problems. Dresser was the brother-in-law of George Washington Vanderbilt II of Biltmore Estate.
- In October 1961, members of the University of Virginia chapter chartered an airplane to Connecticut to try and stop the Yale chapter from admitting the fraternity's first black member, Wendell Mottley. However, Yale University warned that a fraternity showing discrimination "would not be welcome on the Yale campus". Mottley became a member of St. Anthony Hall.
- In 1990, a member from the University of Pennsylvania chapter was kidnapped by members of Psi Upsilon (Castle). As a result, Castle was banned from the university.
- On January 11, 2003, the fraternity held a private black-tie dinner-dance at the Metropolitan Club of Washington, D.C. According to The Washington Post. the $38,000 (equivalent to $66,507 in 2022 money) event "turned into a bacchanal" with same-sex dancing, the theft of decorative items, under-aged drinking, and sexual encounters in the locker rooms. The Metropolitan Club suspended Charlie Ingersoll and Jack Shaw, the St. A. members who sponsored the event, for one month. The letter sent to Shaw and Ingersoll by the Metropolitan Club president said, "The behavior was grossly inappropriate and offensive to many of the staff who worked during the event and violated the standards of our Club."
- In September 2005, the University of North Carolina chapter was charged with running "a speakeasy of sorts". The fraternity's president and the bartender were charged with selling alcohol without a state permit. However, the president was cleared of charges because the law enforcement officer failed to read her the Miranda rights.
- In 2011, St. Anthony Hall alumnus Walter Perry was convicted of embezzling $650,000 (equivalent to $930,288 in 2022) from the Columbia undergraduate chapter. He served two years in prison and was ordered to pay restitution. Perry was also expelled from the fraternity.

== See also ==
- Collegiate secret societies in North America
- History of North American fraternities and sororities
- List of social fraternities
- North American fraternity and sorority housing
