= Banta's Greek Exchange =

American magazine (1912–1973)

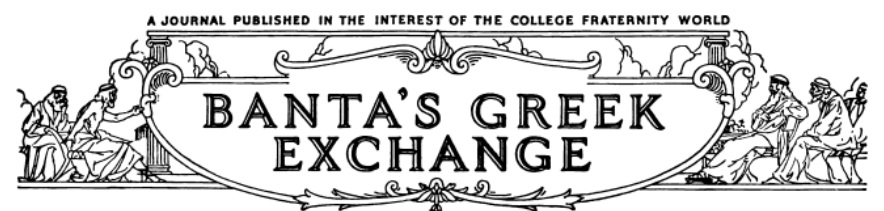
- Banner from October 1930
- Editor-in-Chief: George Banta
- Fraternity editor: Walter B. Palmer
- Sorority editor: Ida Shaw Martin
- Exchange editor: Eleanor Banta
- Business manager: George Banta Jr.
- Categories: Higher Education, Organizations
- Frequency: Monthly
- Founder: George Banta
- First issue: December 1912
- Final issue: July 1973
- Company: George Banta Publishing Company
- Country: United States
- Based in: Menasha, Wisconsin, US
- Language: English

Banta's Greek Exchange was an American magazine for and about college fraternities and sororities. It was published from 1912 to 1973. Its first editor-in-chief was George Banta, followed by his son George Banta Jr. in 1935. Other editors and writers of the magazine included Emily Butterfield, Thomas Arkle Clark, and Ida Shaw Martin.

== History ==
Banta's Greek Exchange was a national magazine for and about college fraternities and sororities in the United States. It was first published in December 1912 as a quarterly. Later, it became a monthly publication. The magazine was published by The Collegiate Press, a division of the George Banta Publishing Company of Menasha, Wisconsin.

Banta's Greek Exchange covered general news concerning the fraternity community. Its articles suggested improvements in fraternity management and discussed problems confronting fraternities. It also included fraternity and sorority directories and a calendar of national conventions. Robert Schwartz notes, "Banta's Greek Exchange was a powerful medium for correspondence and communication among university administrators, including college and university professors, fraternity and sorority national officers, alumni, and undergraduate chapters." He also states that the magazine was "closely read".

Banta's Greek Exchange ceased publication after its July 1973 issue.

== Staff ==
Banta's Greek Exchange was founded by its editor-in-chief and publisher, George Banta, who was a member of Phi Delta Theta fraternity. Other members of the magazine's editorial staff were also affiliated with college fraternities and sororities, including fraternity editor Walter B. Palmer who was also a member of Phi Delta Theta; sorority editor Ida Shaw Martin who was a member of Delta Delta Delta sorority; and exchange editor George Banta Jr. who was a member of Phi Delta Theta. John A. Ayres, a member of Sigma Alpha Epsilon, was the magazine's first business manager. Starting with the second volume in December 1913, Banta's daughter Eleanor Banta, a member of Delta Gamma sorority, was the exchange editor, and his son was the business manager.

Francis W. Shepardson, national president of Beta Theta Pi fraternity, was an associate editor in 1930. Leland F. Leland, member of Tau Kappa Epsilon, was the magazine's publicity manager and typography expert at that time. J. H. Wilterding became the magazine's managing manager in 1933, serving in this capacity until 1955.

Margaret Killen Banta, George Banta Jr.'s wife and the national president of Kappa Alpha Theta sorority, became the magazine's sorority and exchange editor around 1924 and continued as an associate editor for 40 years. George Banta Jr. became the magazine's editor-in-chief and publisher in 1935, taking over from his deceased father with the October 1935 issue. Hayward Biggers, a member of Phi Delta Theta, also became an associate editor in October 1935.

In June 1943, Pearl Drews, a member of Delta Omicron music sorority, became the national editor of the magazine. Later, Mark Banta was the editor of Banta's Greek Exchange. In 1953, Fred H. Turner, dean of students at the University of Illinois and a former national president of Sigma Alpha Epsilon, joined Biggers as an associate editor. John W. Robson became the magazine's managing editor in March 1957.

== Notable contributors ==
- George Banta
- Emily Butterfield
- Thomas Arkle Clark
- F. E. Compton
- Clifton Daniel
- Ida Shaw Martin
- James Morrill
- Jessica Nelson North
- Francis W. Shepardson
- G. Herbert Smith
- Edwin Erle Sparks
- Hartzell Spence
- Benjamin Ide Wheeler
- Andrew Dickson White
- Means Wilkinson
- Henry Wriston

== See also ==
- Baird's Manual of American College Fraternities
