= Sigma Delta Rho (local) =

Fraternity at Amherst College, Massachusetts, US (1909–1932)

- ΣΔΡ
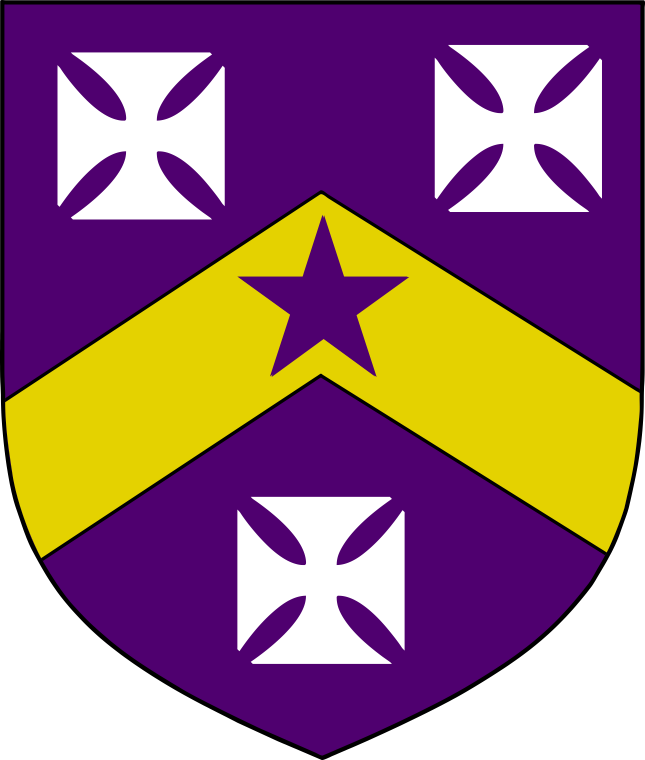
- Founded: 1909; 117 years ago Amherst College
- Type: Social
- Affiliation: Independent
- Status: Defunct
- Defunct date: Early 1980s
- Scope: Local
- Chapters: 1
- Headquarters: Amherst, Massachusetts; United States

Sigma Delta Rho (ΣΔΡ) was a fraternity formerly active at Amherst College that eventually affiliated with Theta Xi before reverting to local status as Alpha Theta Xi, thereafter becoming defunct as a chapter but continuing as a co-ed cooperative.

== History ==
=== Founding and early years ===
The fraternity was founded in 1909 as the result of a membership split in the Hitchcock Club, a local campus literary society. Their first house was a rented property on Tyler Place. In 1913 the fraternity purchased and moved into a property which it continued to occupy until 1924 before acquiring a new house at 62 Snell Street.

The Sigma Delta Rho house pictured in 1919

Sigma Delta Rho became briefly inactive with the onset of World War I. In 1922 alumni helped re-establish the chapter, initiating 22 undergraduates.

=== Merger with Theta Xi ===
In 1932 Sigma Delta Rho affiliated with Theta Xi, becoming that fraternity's Alpha Mu chapter. Their house was significantly rebuilt in 1940 to expand and modernize it, taking the official name "Humphries House" and later becoming informally known as "the Zoo" (a moniker the building continued to hold until as recently as 2002, and later, "the Zu").

=== Return to independent status, demise ===
The Amherst Theta Xi chapter became a local fraternity known as Alpha Theta Xi after its charter was pulled for "insubordination" in 1957. (Another source said "the suspension was made because the fraternity environment at Amherst was not condu[c]ive to strong chapters, and the Amherst Theta Xi chapter had not been living up to fraternity ritual."—reporters observed this was most likely related to the initiation of an African-American). By the 1970s, according to one account, the group had started to attract "nonconformists" and "seemed to morph into a sort of counterculture theme house, merely going through the motions of being a fraternity." By the early 1980s, the fraternity was gone. The building continues as a student-run cooperative called Humphries House.

== Symbols ==
The fraternity's coat of arms was designed by commission of Emily Butterfield and accepted by the fraternity in 1925, replacing a design that had been previously employed.
