= Thomas Arkle Clark =

American academic (1862–1932)

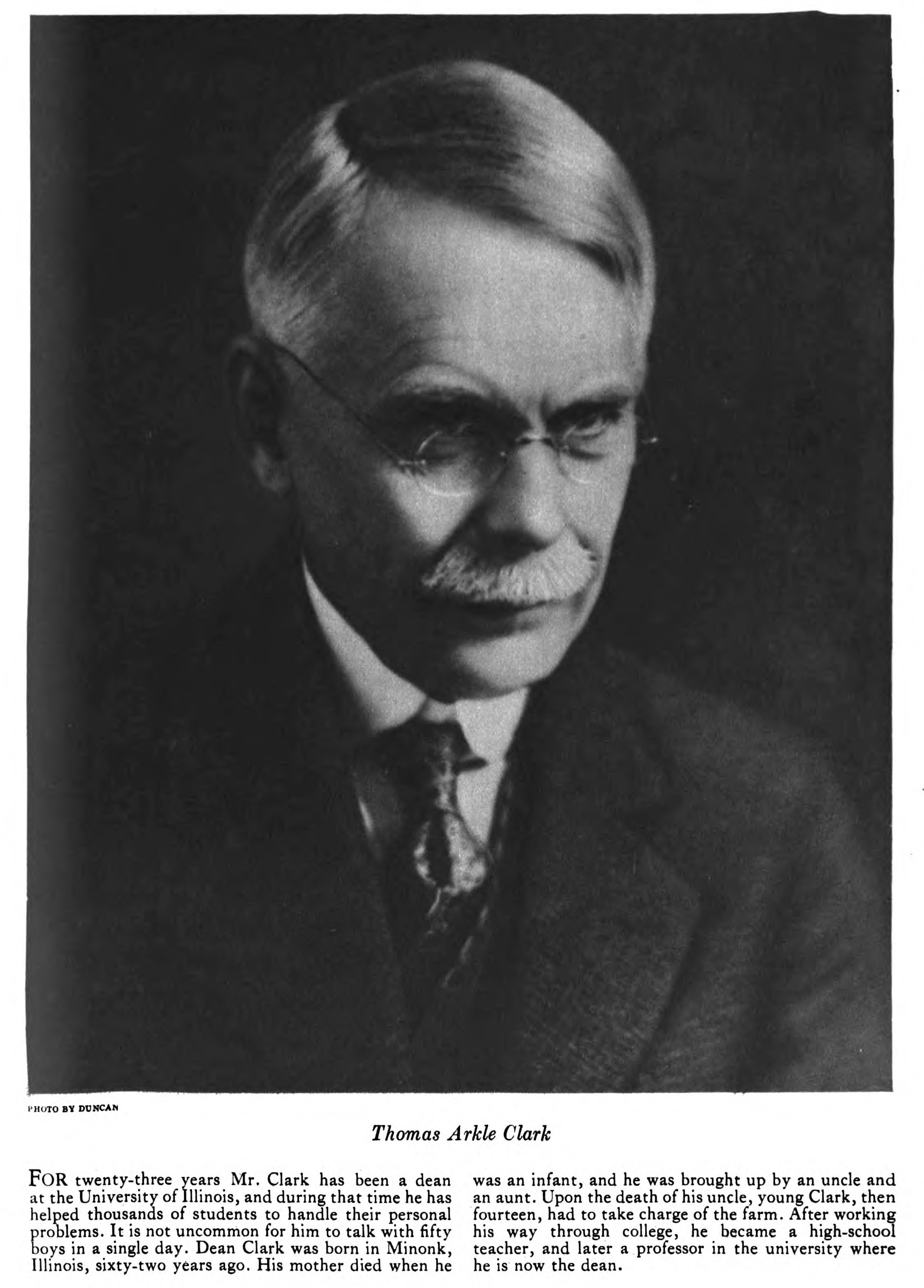
Photo c. 1925

Thomas Arkle Clark (May 11, 1862 in Minonk, Illinois– July 18, 1932), born Thomas Arkle Metcalf and known as Tommy Arkle, was an American academic who was first to hold the position of dean of men at an American university.

Born and raised in rural Illinois, Clark was orphaned at a young age and was adopted by an aunt. He graduated from the University of Illinois in 1890, then supervised a local school. Named an assistant professor at the university in 1893, Clark rose to full professor status in 1900. A favorite of university president Andrew S. Draper, Clark was named dean of the College of Literature in 1900, then dean of undergraduates in 1901. This office was later renamed Dean of Men, making Clark the first to hold the title. Clark was known for his ruthless vigilance over students and was particularly opposed to alcohol and automobiles. However, Clark was a friend to the Greek community in the university, rising to lead the national chapter of Alpha Tau Omega and often supporting the system in the press. He also founded Phi Eta Sigma in 1923.

== Biography ==
Thomas Arkle Metcalf was born on 1862, in Marshall County, Illinois. Shortly after his birth, his mother Mary died. His father William then moved the family near Rantoul, Illinois to be closer to other family. However, Thomas' father struggled to make ends meet as a farmer there, as he was only skilled as a coal miner. When William died in 1872, Thomas was adopted by his aunt, Mary Metcalf Clark, taking her adoptive name.

Clark worked on the family farm until 1886, when he was able to persuade his adoptive mother to sell the farm and move to nearby Champaign. Clark attended the University of Illinois Academy, a preparatory school for the University of Illinois. He was then admitted to the university and graduated with a bachelor's degree in 1890. During his studies, he worked at The News Gazette. Clark intended to go into politics, but quickly realized that he enjoyed managing campaigns more.

Clark's first job was teaching at the Eastside School, where he quickly rose to become principal. In 1893, Clark was offered a position as an assistant professor of rhetoric at the University of Illinois. Two years later he was named an associate professor. In 1895, he was initiated in the Gamma Zeta chapter of Alpha Tau Omega. Clark took classes over two summers at the University of Chicago, then attended Harvard University for a year. With these new credentials, Clark was promoted to full professor and head of the rhetoric department in 1899.

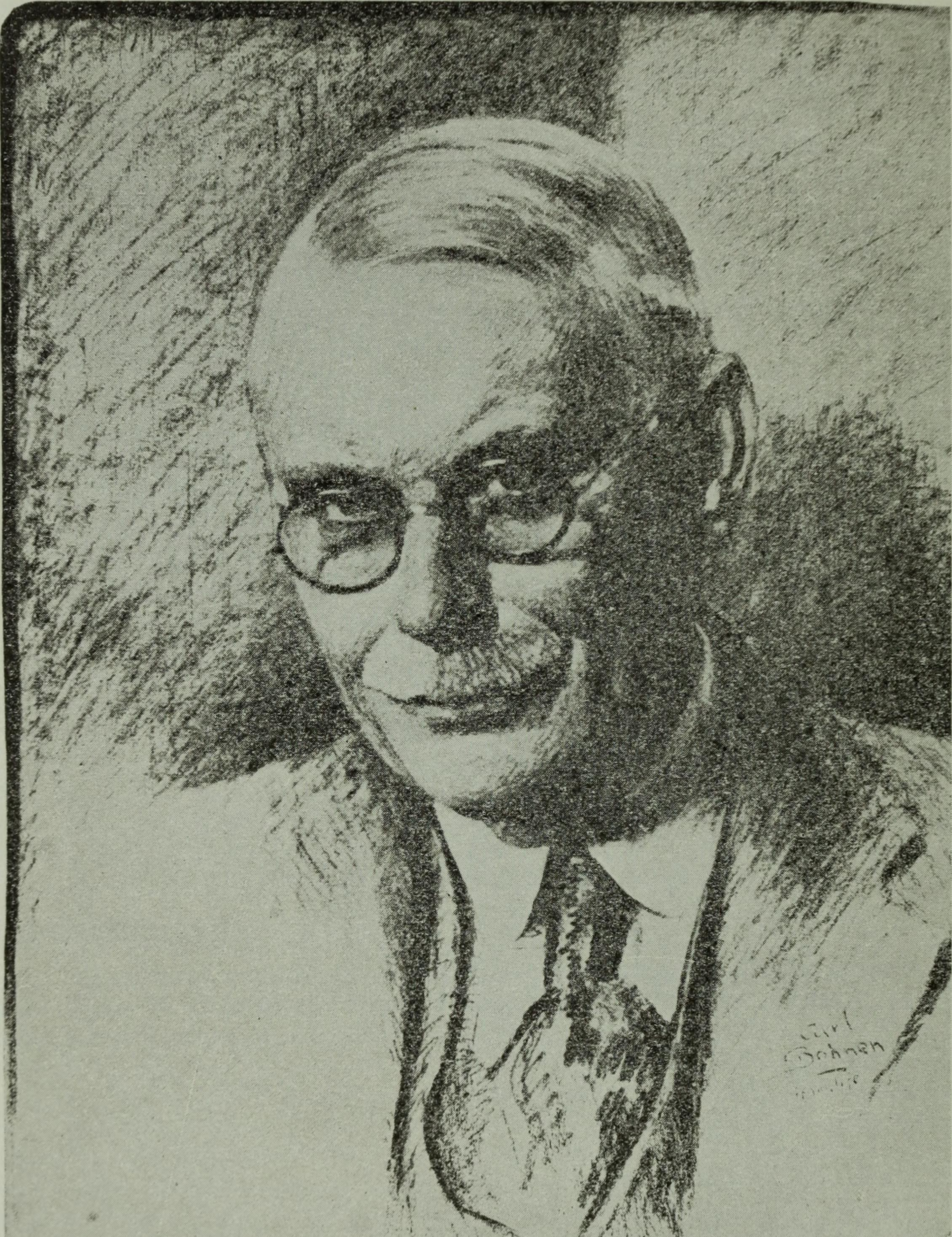
Drawing c. 1932

Clark became a favorite of university president Andrew S. Draper, and Draper named him Acting Dean of the College of Literature in 1900. The next year, Clark was named Dean of Undergraduates and Assistant to the President, making Clark a member of the school's Council of Administration. Edmund J. James, Draper's successor, kept Clark on as Dean of Undergraduates though the title later changed to Dean of Men. Clark the first to ever hold this title. Clark served as Dean of Men until 1931 despite Stanford University offering him a position as Dean of Men. In exchange for Clark's loyalty, President James expanded Clark's role in the administration.

Clark would use his expanded authority to shape the role of fraternities and sororities at the University of Illinois. His first steps were to minimize the influence of the local Theta Nu Epsilon chapter, a secret fraternity. Clark was also heavily involved with official fraternities and worked closely with the L.G. Balfour Company to provide them with hardware. Clark was also a friend of George Banta and was often published in his Greek Exchange magazine. Under Clark's direction, Illinois grew to have one of the largest fraternity and sorority systems in the nation. He also established a Student Publications Board to oversee campus publications. Clark dismissed students caught hazing and established a program personally welcoming freshmen.

In 1911, he began a program issuing a handbook to freshmen concerning rules, regulations, and advice. He maintained a vigilant watch on his students through contact with local police, coaches, townspeople, and Pinkerton. By the time of his retirement in August 1931, Clark had greatly expanded the role of Dean of Men, overseeing the Dean of Foreign Students, Assistant Dean of Men, Dean for Freshmen, and Adviser to Student Activities. Clark co-founded the National Association of Student Personnel Administrators in 1919. In 1923, he founded the Phi Eta Sigma honors society.

During prohibition, Clark used his fraternity contacts to uncover illegal distribution of alcohol. He would relay some of this information to the Bureau of Prohibition. In 1927, Clark worked with Eliot Ness to combat bootlegging in Champaign-Urbana. Clark also despised automobiles and would expel students caught driving one unless they had an off-campus job. Students believed that Clark operated a spy ring on campus and that he once slid down a fraternity chimney to break up an illegal party.

Clark married Alice Broddus, a fellow graduate of Illinois, on August 24, 1896. They had no children. Thomas Clark was Worthy Grand Chief of Alpha Tau Omega from 1918 to 1923, then again from 1929 to 1931. In November 1931, Clark had a tumor removed from his abdomen. The cancer returned the next January. That July, Clark slipped into a coma. He died three days later on July 18, 1932. The national chapter of Alpha Tau Omega presents the Thomas Arkle Clark Award to its most promising seniors.

== Publications ==
- The Sunday Eight O'clock: Brief Sermons for the Undergraduates (1916)
- The Fraternity and the Undergraduate (1917)
- Discipline and Derelict: Being a Series of Essays on Those Who Tread the Green Carpet (1921)
- When You Write a Letter: Some Suggestions as to Why, When, and How It Should Be Done (1921)
