= Francis W. Shepardson =

American educator and fraternity executive

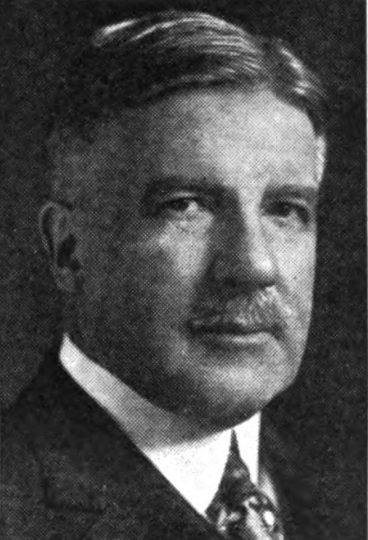
- Francis W. Shepardson, c. 1919
- Born: Francis Wayland Shepardson; October 15, 1862; Cheviot, Ohio, US
- Died: August 9, 1937 (aged 74); Ohio, US
- Burial place: Mapel Shade Cemetery, Granville, Ohio
- Education: Denison University, B.A. 1882, M.A. 1886 Brown University, B.A. 1883 Yale University, Ph.D. 1892
- Occupations: Professor and educator
- Employer(s): University of Chicago; Julius Rosenwald Fund
- Title: Director Illinois Department of Registration and Education
- Term: 1917-1921

Francis Wayland Shepardson (October 15, 1862 – August 9, 1937) was an American academic, historian, politician, author, editor, and Greek letter society executive. He taught at the University of Chicago for 25 years and was the first director of the Illinois Department of Registration and Education. He was also the secretary and acting director of the Julius Rosenwald Fund.

Shepardson was a founder and chairman of the National Interfraternity Conference. He was editor of Baird's Manual of American College Fraternities and Banta's Greek Exchange. He was the first president of the Association of College Honor Societies, the national president of Beta Theta Pi for twenty years, president of Acacia Fraternity, and the national vice president of Phi Beta Kappa. Upon his death, The New York Times noted, "There was no man better known to the college fraternities with their 500,000 members than Francis W. Shepardson..."

== Early life ==
Shepardson was born on October 15, 1862 in Cheviot, Ohio. His parents were Eliza (née Smart) and Daniel Shepardson, an educator and Doctor of Divinity. The family lived in Piqua, Ohio, while Shepardson was an infant and moved to Granville, Ohio in 1868. There, Daniel Shepardson taught at the Young Ladies' Institute and founded Shepardson College for Women, later the women's division of Denison University.

Shepardson attended Denison University in Granville, graduating with a Bachelor of Arts degree in 1882. While there, he joined Beta Theta Pi fraternity in 1882. He then attended Brown University, graduating with a Bachelor of Arts degree in 1883, with Phi Beta Kappa honors. He joined Brown's Beta Theta Pi chapter in 1883.

Shepardson returned to Denison University, earning a Master of Arts degree in 1886. In 1890, he enrolled in Yale University, studying political economy and graduating with a Doctor of Philosophy in June 1892.

== Career ==
Shepardson taught at the Young Ladies' Institute in Granville, Ohio, from 1883 to 1887. From 1887 to 1890, he was editor of the Granville Times and also worked for Kussmaul & Shepardson printers, book-sellers and stationers.

In 1892, Shepardson became one of the original faculty members of the University of Chicago. He was a docent and the university extension secretary of library and publications from 1892 to 1893, a university extension assistant in history from 1893 to 1895, and an instructor in American history and secretary of the lecture-study Department of the University Extension Division from 1895 to 1897. Shepardson was an assistant professor of American history from 1897 to 1901 and also served as the secretary to the university's president from 1897 to 1904. He became an associate professor of American history in 1901 and dean of the senior colleges (graduate schools) from 1904 to 1907.

In 1904, Shepardson was a delegate for Frank O. Lowden, representing Chicago's seventh ward in the Illinois Republican Convention. While a university professor, he was an editorial writer and book reviewer for the Chicago Tribune from 1906 to 1910. Taking a three year leave of absence from the university around 1914, he was a lecturer and consultant for the American Teacher's Assembly in Baguio, Philippines. He continued to teach at the University of Chicago through July 1917.

In April 1917, Illinois Governor Frank O. Lowden appointed Shepardson as the first director of the Illinois Department of Registration and Education. Shepardson continued in this position through the end of Lowden's term in 1921. Shepardson was also director of the state's Normal School Board and the Immigrants Commission during this period.

In 1921, Shepardson became the secretary and acting director of the Julius Rosenwald Fund, working directly with Julius Rosenwald to educate African American children and adults in the Southern United States. He served in this capacity through 1926.

Shepardson was a member of the American Asiatic Society, the American Geographical Society, the American Historical Association, and the Illinois State Historical Society. He was also president of the History and Political Science Club at the University of Chicago.

== Greek letter organizations ==
Shepardson was widely known as an authority on Greek letter organizations and was "foremost protagonist of the college fraternity system" of his era. He was the first president of the Association of College Honor Societies and a founder of the National Interfraternity Conference, serving as its first secretary and, later, as its chairman. He was an editor of Baird's Manual of American College Fraternities and Banta's Greek Exchange.

Shepardson was a member of Beta Theta Pi college fraternity, serving as the fraternity's general secretary from 1907 to 1917 and its president from 1918 to his death in 1937. He was also the editor of The Beta Theta Pi from 1917 to 1930, and wrote five books about the fraternity, including the The Beta Book: The Story and Manual of Beta Theta Pi. His dedication to the fraternity earned him the nickname "Mr. Beta Theta Pi".

Shepardson was a member of the Center Star Lodge of Acacia Fraternity in Granville, Ohio. He served three terms as Acacia's national grand president, from 1910 to 1914. He was the fraternity's national historian and also served as its grand editor from 1918 to 1919. He published a history of the fraternity in 1913.

He was also active with the Phi Beta Kappa honor society. He became the secretary of the Beta of Illinois chapter in 1900 and compiled chapter catalogs in 1909 and 1915. In 1911, he helped organize the Theta of Ohio chapter at Denison University. In 1915, he wrote a history of the Beta of Illinois chapter. He was a delegate to the Phi Beta Kappa council in 1910 and each succeeding council. He became one of its senators in 1913 and its national vice president, starting in 1919.

Upon his death, The New York Times noted, "There was no man better known to the college fraternities with their 500,000 members than Francis W. Shepardson..."

== Honors ==
Denison University awarded Shepardson an honorary LL.D. in 1906. The 29th National Interfraternity Conference opened with a memorial in tribute to Shepardson.

In May 2001, Beta Theta Pi established the Francis W. Shepardson Award for members "who embody the spirit and dedication of Brother Shepardson and epitomize the concept of lifelong service to the General Fraternity". It is the fraternity's highest service award.

== Personal life ==
Shepardson married Cora Lenore Whitcomb on September 3, 1894, in Clinton, Indiana. They had one son, John Whitcomb Shepardson.

Shepardson was president of the Illinois Society of the Sons of the American Revolution from 1908 to 1913 and 1915 to 1918. He was the secretary of the Denison University Association of the Alumni. He was a charter member and chancellor of the Altamaha Lodge No. 296 of the Knights of Pythias in Granville, Ohio. He belonged to the Chicago chapter no. 127 of the Royal Arch Masons, the Chevalier Bayard Commandery no. 52 of Knights Templar of Chicago, and the Center Star Lodge no. 11 of the Free and Accepted Masons of Granville, Ohio. He was a Baptist.

Shepardson died from a heart attack on August 9, 1937, while traveling by bus from Newark to Columbus, Ohio. His funeral service was held in Swasey Chapel at Denison University on August 13, 1937. His ashes were interred in Maple Grove Cemetery in Granville.

== Selected publications ==
=== As author ===
- The American People; A Complete History of the United States. with Arthur Gilman. Springfield, Ohio: Mast, Crowell & Kirkpatrick, 1895.
- Alpha Eta Chapter of the Beta Theta Pi: An Account of its Foundation and Growth, its Membership and College Records, with a List of its Prizes Won, Chapter Songs, and Various Other Materials of Interest. Granville, Ohio: Times Book and Job Print, 1885.
- The United States in the Nineteenth Century. Chicago: The University of Chicago Press, 1902.
- "The Army in the War of 1812". in The Making of America, vol. 9, editorial edition. Robert Marion La Follette, editor. Chicago: John D. Morris & Company/The Making of America, 1906.
- The Shepardson Family, a Record of the Early Generations in America (issues 1–9). with John Eaton Shepardson and Albert R. Shepardson. s.l., 1907.
- Scripture and Song in Worship: A Service Book for the Sunday School. with Lester Bartlett Jones. Chicago: The University of Chicago Press, 1911.
- Acacia, 1904-1913; Historical Sketch of the Fraternity. Chicago: Acacia Grand Council, 1913.
- Shall Physicians Have Annual Registration? Springfield, Illinois: Schnett & Barnes, State Printers, 1919.
- A Report on the Administration of the Medical Practice Act from July 1, 1917, to December 31, 1918. Springfield, Illinois: Schnett & Barnes, State Printers, 1919.
- "Fifteen Hundred New Country Schoolhouses," The Christian Science Monitor. August 18, 1922
- The Beta Book: The Story and Manual of Beta Theta Pi. Menasha, Wisconsin: The Collegiate Press/George Banta Publishing Company, 1927.
- The Beta Book: The Story of Beta Theta Pi. Revised edition. Menasha, Wisconsin: The Collegiate Press/George Banta Publishing Company, 1930.
- Denison University, 1831-1931: A Centennial History. Granville, Ohio: Denison University/The Granville Times and Publishing Co., 1931.
- Alpha Eta: The Story of Beta Theta Pi at Denision. Granville, Ohio: The Chapter/The Granville Times and Publishing Co., 1937.

=== As editor ===
- Third General Catalogue of the Officers and Alumni of Denison University...1831-1885. Granville, Ohio: Times Book and Job Print, June 1885.
- Fourth General Catalogue of the Officers and Alumni of Denison University...1831-1888. Granville, Ohio: The Association of the Alumni, June 1888.
- Fifth General Catalogue of the Officers and Alumni of Denison University...1831-1893. Granville, Ohio: The Association of the Alumni, June 1893.
- Phi Beta Kappa: The Beta of Illinois Chapter Historical Sketch and List of Members. Chicago: The University of Chicago, February 15, 1915.
- Baird's Manual of American College Fraternities, 11th edition. Menasha, Wisconsin: The Collegiate Press/George Banta Publishing Company, 1927.
- Baird's Manual of American College Fraternities, 12th edition. Menasha, Wisconsin: The Collegiate Press/George Banta Publishing Company, 1930.
- Songs of [Beta Theta Pi]: Music Published by the Fraternity in its Ninety-Fourth Year, 18th edition. with James L. Gavin and Harold J. Baily. Beta Theta Pi, 1932.
- Beta Theta Pi: A Catalogue of the Fraternity in its Ninety-Fifth Year, 10th edition. with Norman Pomeroy Hall. Menasha, Wisconsin: The Collegiate Press/ George Banta Publishing Company, 1933.
- Baird's Manual of American College Fraternities, 13th edition. Menasha, Wisconsin: The Collegiate Press/George Banta Publishing Company, 1935.
- Beta Bards in Sentiment and Song from Beta Hearts, 1839-1936. Menasha, Wisconsin: George Banta Publishing Company, 1836.
