= George Sr. and Ellen Banta House =

Historic house in Wisconsin, United States

- U.S. National Register of Historic Places
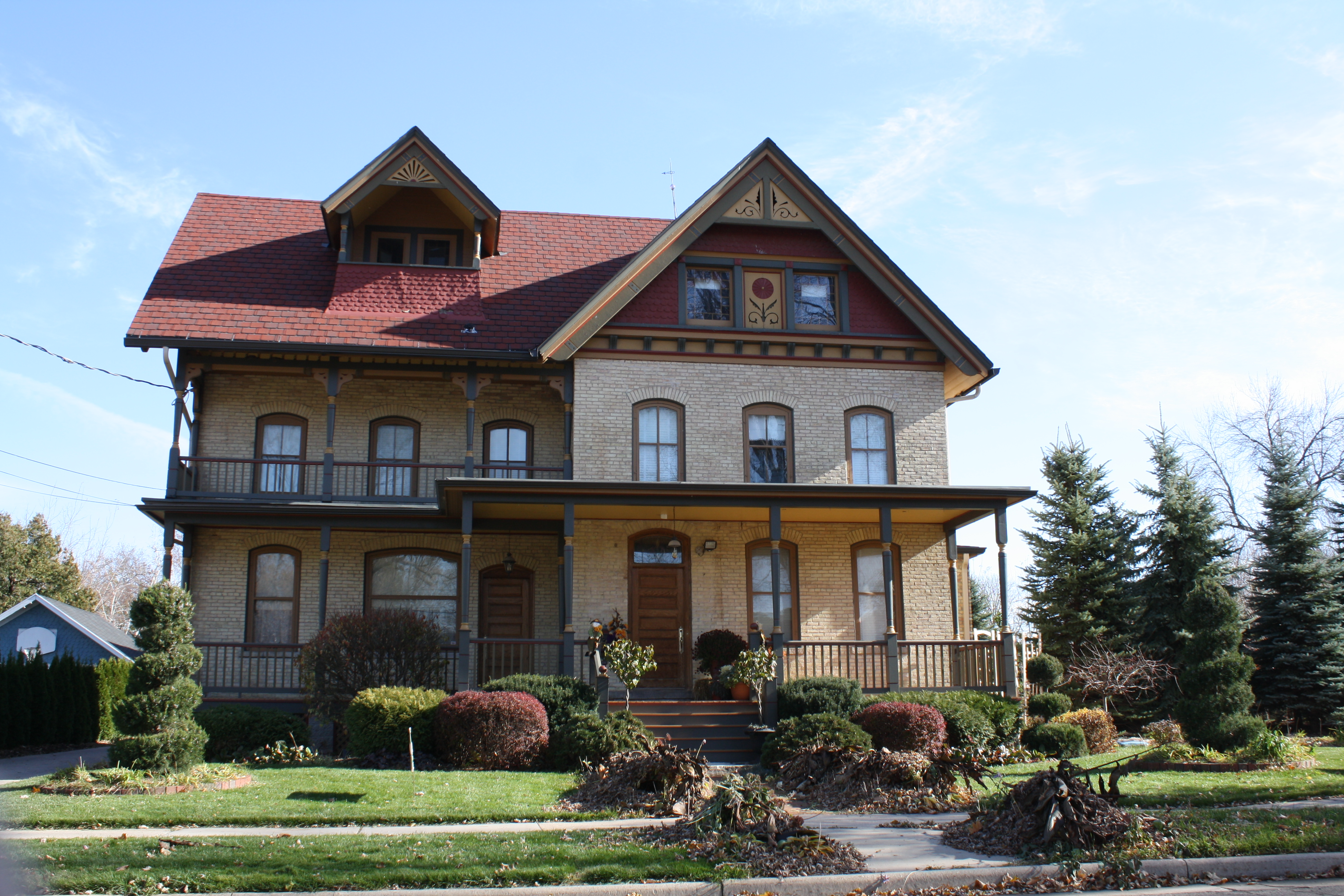
- View from west in 2010

- Location within Wisconsin Location within the United States
- Location: 348 Naymut Street; Menasha, Wisconsin, U.S.
- Coordinates: 44°11′48.3″N 88°26′39.1″W
- Area: less than one acre
- Built: 1878, 1888
- Architect: William Waters
- Architectural style: Queen Anne
- NRHP reference No.: 97000366
- Added to NRHP: May 5, 1997; 29 years ago

The George Sr. and Ellen Banta House is located at 348 Naymut Street in Menasha, Wisconsin.

== History ==
Originally built in 1878, the house on Doty Island underwent significant renovations in 1888.

The house was originally occupied by George Banta (1857–1935) and his second wife Ellen (1866–1951). Banta, who also became a prominent local politician, began producing prints on a small press in the dining room of the house, an endeavor which eventually turned into the Banta Corporation. Its plant and headquarters (from 1911 to 1988) were a few blocks away, at Ahnaip and Racine streets.

In 1997, the house was added to both the state and the National Register of Historic Places.
