= Alice Manicur =

American educator (1924–2017)

- Alice Manicur, from a 1954 newspaper
- Born: September 13, 1924; McDowell County, West Virginia
- Died: January 2, 2017 (aged 92)
- Occupation(s): Educator, college administrator

Alice Roberta Manicur (September 13, 1924 – January 2, 2017) was an American educator and college administrator. She was dean of students and vice president of Frostburg State University, and president of the National Association for Student Personnel Administrators. She was inducted into the Maryland Women's Hall of Fame in 2012.

== Early life and education ==
Manicur was born in McDowell County, West Virginia, the daughter of Salvatore (Sam) Manicure and Jeanette Roberts Manicure. Her father, a coal miner, was born in Italy. She graduated Berea College in 1954, earned a master's degree at Indiana University Bloomington in 1955, and completed doctoral studies in student personnel administration at Indiana University Bloomington in 1960. Her dissertation was titled "Problem Areas and Acceptability of Student Behavior as Indicated by Residence Hall and Sorority Women at Indiana University."

== Career ==
During and after World War II, Manicur worked a variety of jobs to support her siblings. After she earned her master's degree, she was a counselor at MacMurray College. In 1960, she became the first dean of students at Frostburg State College; in 1972, her position was upgraded to vice president of student affairs. She retired from Frostburg in 2007.

Manicur was active in the National Association for Student Personnel Administrators (NASPA), and was the first woman to be president of NASPA when she was elected in 1976. She also served on the Board of Trustees of Berea College.

Manicur was inducted into the Maryland Women's Hall of Fame in 2012. A meeting space on the Frostburg State University campus is named the Alice R. Manicur Assembly Hall in her honor.

== Publications ==
- "Status of Professional Women in Higher Education" (1969)
- "Toward a Student Oriented Health Service" (1976, with Janice N. Harris and Lloyd E. Greene)

== Personal life ==
Manicur was an avid traveler, and visited all seven continents. She died in 2017, aged 92 years. There is a collection of her papers at Bowling Green State University Libraries. NASPA holds a bi-annual Alice Manicur Women's Symposium.
