= Donald D. Belcher =

Donald David Belcher (November 29, 1938 – July 6, 2018) was chairman and CEO of Banta Corporation from 1994 until his retirement in 2004.

Belcher joined Banta in 1994 as president and chief operating officer. Prior to Banta, Belcher was with Avery Dennison Corporation for more than 20 years culminating in senior group vice president, worldwide office products.

Belcher held a B.A. from Dartmouth College and an M.B.A. from the Stanford University Graduate School of Business.

== Background ==
Belcher served as a member of the Arena Pharmaceuticals board of directors since December 2003 and served as National Commissioner of the Boy Scouts of America from 2004 to 2008. Belcher was a member of the National Executive Board of the Boy Scouts of America, the organization's governing body.

Prior to joining Banta, Belcher was senior group vice president of Avery Dennison Corporation, Pasadena, California. He joined Avery in 1972 and became general manager, Resale Division, in 1974, and vice president and general manager of Avery's Industrial Division in 1975. In 1977 Belcher began a five-year executive assignment with Avery's European operations, serving first in Marlow, England, as vice president and general manager overseeing Avery's European converting companies. He was promoted to group vice president, Material Group, based in Leiden, Holland, with responsibility for all international operations including Europe, South America, South Africa and Australia. Belcher returned to California in 1982 as group vice president of Avery's office products group. He was promoted to senior group vice president in 1990.

Belcher died July 6, 2018, at the age of 79.
