= National Association of Student Personnel Administrators =

U.S.-based student affairs organization

- Abbreviation: NASPA
- Formation: January 1919; 107 years ago
- Founders: Robert Rienow, Thomas Arkle Clark
- Founded at: Madison, Wisconsin, U.S.
- Type: 501(c)(3)
- Tax ID no.: 52-1542164
- Legal status: Nonprofit organization
- Purpose: To provide professional development and advocacy for student affairs educators and administrators who share the responsibility for a campus-wide focus on the student experience.
- Headquarters: 1 Dupont Circle NW, Suite 300, Washington, D.C., U.S.
- Coordinates: 38°54′33″N 77°2′40″W
- Fields: Student affairs
- Members: 13,000 members (2015)
- President: Amelia Parnell
- Chair, Board of Directors: Michael Christakis
- Revenue: $14,893,664 (2020)
- Expenses: $17,255,113 (2020)
- Employees: 77 (2019)
- Volunteers: 2,400 (2019)
- Website: naspa.org
- Formerly called: Conference of Deans and Advisers of Men (CDAM) (1919–1929); National Association of Deans and Advisers of Men (NADAM) (1929–1951)

The NASPA, Student Affairs Administrators in Higher Education is a U.S.-based student affairs organization with over 13,000 members at 1,400 campuses in 25 countries. Founded in 1919 at the University of Wisconsin, NASPA focuses on professionals working within the field of student affairs.

Every year, NASPA offers awards to "higher education and student affairs leaders, programs, and initiatives" in a variety of categories.

== History ==
In December 1918, Robert Rienow, the dean at the University of Iowa, wrote a letter to Thomas Arkle Clark, dean of men at the University of Illinois, about wanting to establish a conference that would bring together various deans in the Midwest. They facilitated the founding meeting held at the University of Wisconsin–Madison in January 1919. The first meeting was quite small—three deans of men and three professors having campus basic interests were in attendance.

Professor Louis A. Strauss of the University of Michigan referred to the first meeting as the "Conference of Deans and Advisers of Men". This label was used in prevalence until 1929, when it was changed to the National Association of Deans and Advisers of Men (NADAM). The new name was more fitting because many American universities did not have the "Dean of Men" title. Thomas Arkle Clark was the first person to claim the title in 1909, although he assumed the responsibilities in 1901. Scott Goodnight, dean of men at the University of Wisconsin–Madison, served as host for this historic first meeting. Retroactively, he is referred to as the first president of NADAM.

In 1925, the first piece of "research" – presented by John Bennett of Teachers College, Columbia University – was offered at a NADAM meeting. It dealt with the prevalence of the office of dean of men in American colleges and universities. The last meeting of the '20s was the first to be conducted away from the college campus; there were 76 participants, each paying dues of $10.

In the 1930s, there were continued requests for publications to be submitted to the conferences. The NASPA Journal, as a result, was first introduced in 1963. Before that time, newsletters were the primary way of communicating regarding published material.

One of the Association's major preoccupations in the 1940s was World War II and its aftermath. The adaptation of campuses to the war effort are reflected in the conference minutes, and the problems relating to veterans once the war was over took the rest of the decade. The decade was noted by the presence of Armour Blackburn of Howard University, the first African-American administrator to participate and serve on an executive committee.

As student affairs offices began to change and administrators no longer used "Dean of Men" and "Advisor of Men" as their titles, the organization followed suit. Mary Ethel Ball, acting dean of students at the University of Colorado, became the first female "institutional representative," although women had participated in meetings since the 20s. Dean Wesley P. Lloyd at Brigham Young University recommended a name change in 1951 to the National Association of Student Personnel Administrators (NASPA). This gave a new breadth to the organization, which stated its purpose: "to discuss and study the most effective methods of aiding students in their intellectual, social, moral, and personal development".

Five commissions were established at the 1951 conference to deal with substantive, ongoing issues (e.g., professional relationships, ethics, professional preparation). A secondary benefit of the commissions was in making more members able to participate in the association's activities.

The 1960s marked many changes in NASPA. For the first time, outside funding was secured for a NASPA activity, making the association an early leader in educating members concerning drug abuse. NASPA was an active participant in the development of the Joint Statement on Rights and Freedoms of Students. From 1966 until the end of the decade and beyond, crisis was the most prominent campus issue and the most prominent association concern. Some deans were enormously successful in protecting both their campuses and the rights of students, but disruption of campuses became more prevalent.

During the 1970s, increased regionalization heightened opportunities for involvement across the whole spectrum of NASPA's membership. Alice Manicur of Frostburg State College became the first female president, and community colleges began to make their presence felt. George Young at Broward Community College was the first community college person to serve as president of NASPA.

It was during this decade that NASPA first established a national office under the leadership of Channing Briggs at Portland State University. Upon Briggs' retirement in 1981, Richard F. Stevens became the second executive director, and the national office was moved to Ohio State University. In 1985, the association voted to move its headquarters to Washington, D.C., and in 1987, Elizabeth M. Nuss of Indiana University, succeeded Stevens. In 1995, Gwendolyn Dungy succeeded Nuss. In 2000 the National Association for Women in Education was merged into NASPA.

Laurence Smith, Vice President for Student Affairs and Enrollment Management at Eastern Michigan University, initiated the concept of the Centers for Innovation in February 2000, proposing centers for leadership, public policy, research, and technology to guide professional development for the association.

== Presidents ==
- Theresa A. Powell - first African American female president
