= Phi Eta Sigma =

American collegiate honor society

- ΦΗΣ
- Founded: March 22, 1923; 103 years ago University of Illinois
- Type: Honor
- Affiliation: ACHS
- Status: Active
- Emphasis: Freshman scholarship
- Scope: National
- Motto: Φρόνις ἐστί δύναμις' "Knowledge is Power"
- Colors: Gold and Black
- Publication: The Forum
- Chapters: 400
- Members: 1,400,000 lifetime
- Headquarters: Box 870261; Tuscaloosa, Alabama 35487-0328; United States
- Website: www.phietasigma.org

Phi Eta Sigma (ΦΗΣ) is an American freshman honor society. Founded at the University of Illinois in 1923, it is the oldest and largest freshman honor society. It is a member of the Association of College Honor Societies.

== History ==
Phi Eta Sigma was founded by Thomas Arkle Clark at the University of Illinois on March 22, 1923. Clark was a professor and dean of the university. Phi Eta Sigma was established as an honor society for male freshmen.

It became a national society with the addition of chapters at the University of Missouri and the University of Michigan in 1926. This was followed by chapters at the University of Oklahoma and the University of Wisconsin in 1927 and the Miami University and Ohio State University in 1928. Phi Eta Sigma held its first national convention on November 23, 1928, at Urbana, Illinois. Clark was elected national president.

By 1930, Phi Eta Sigma had eleven chapters. It joined the Association of College Honor Societies (ACHS) on February 27, 1937. By 1962, the society had 117 active chapters and 76,447 initiates.

By 2011, Phi Eta Sigma had grown to 366 active chapters and had initiated 997,438 members. It left the ACHS in 2011 but was rejoined in 2018. In 2025, it had 400 chapters and 1,400,000 total members. It is the oldest and largest freshman honor society.

== Symbols ==
The name Phi Eta Sigma was chosen to stand for the Greek words for "Lovers of Wisdom". The society's motto is Φρόνις ἐστί δύναμις, translated as "Knowledge is Power".

The Phi Eta Sigma crest features a shield with the Greek letters ΦΗΣ, a pyramid which symbolizes strength, and a lamp for scholarship. Above the shield are three links of chain and a gold star, symbolizing noble character. Below the shield is the society's motto.

The society's emblem is a gold key in the shape of a scroll, with the Greek letters ΦΗΣ in black enamel. Its colors are gold and black. The society's magazine is The Forum, established in 1930.

== Membership ==
Any first-year student with a GPA of at least 3.5 or rank in the top twenty percent in his or her class at the end of a full curricular period (i.e., quarter, semester, or year) is eligible for membership. Once inducted, membership is conferred for life.

== Activities ==
Annually, Phi Eta Sigma provides $400,000 total in scholarships to members. There are $1,000 awards and $5,000 scholarships for undergraduate study, as well as $7,000 scholarships for the first year of graduate study.

== Governance ==
Phi Eta Sigma's executive officers are elected at the biennial conventions. Its headquarters are in Tuscaloosa, Alabama.

== Chapters ==
In 2025, Phi Eta Sigma had 400 chapters.

== Notable members ==
Phi Eta Sigma has inducted more than 1,400,000 members since its founding.

== See also ==
- Honor cords
