= Doty Island =

River island in Wisconsin, United States

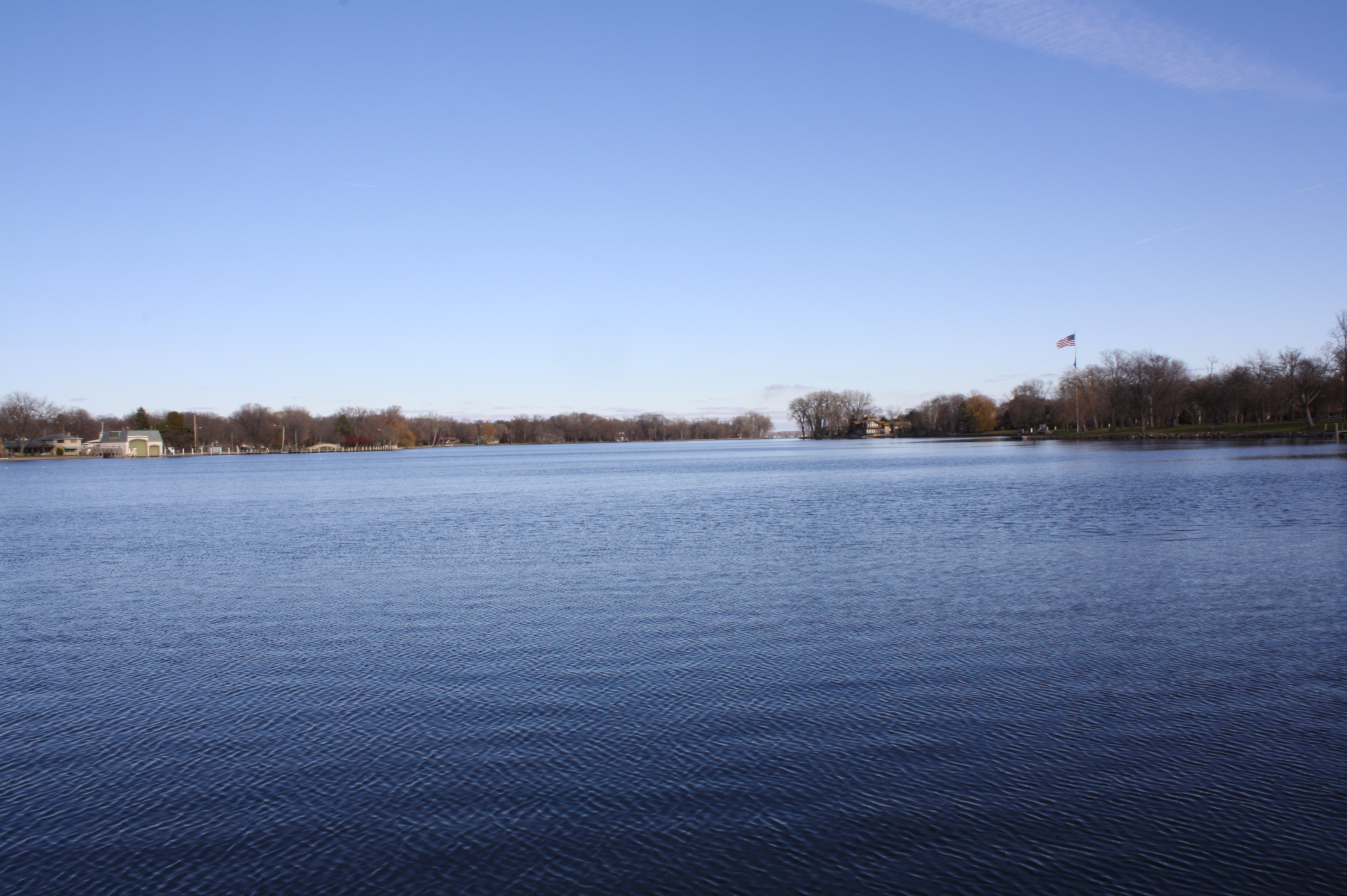
- Looking north at Doty Island over the Fox River

- Location within Wisconsin Location within the United States

Geography
- Location: Lake Winnebago
- Coordinates: 44°11′37″N 88°26′51″W
- Highest elevation: 755 ft (230.1 m)

Administration
- United States
- State: Wisconsin
- County: Winnebago
- Cities: Menasha and Neenah

Doty Island is an island in Winnebago County, Wisconsin. Its northern part is in the city of Menasha and its southern part is in the city of Neenah, divided by Nicolet Boulevard. Doty Island is surrounded by two branches of the Fox River on the north and south, flowing from Lake Winnebago to the east, and Little Lake Butte des Morts to the west. The island's elevation is approximately 755 feet (230 m) above sea level.

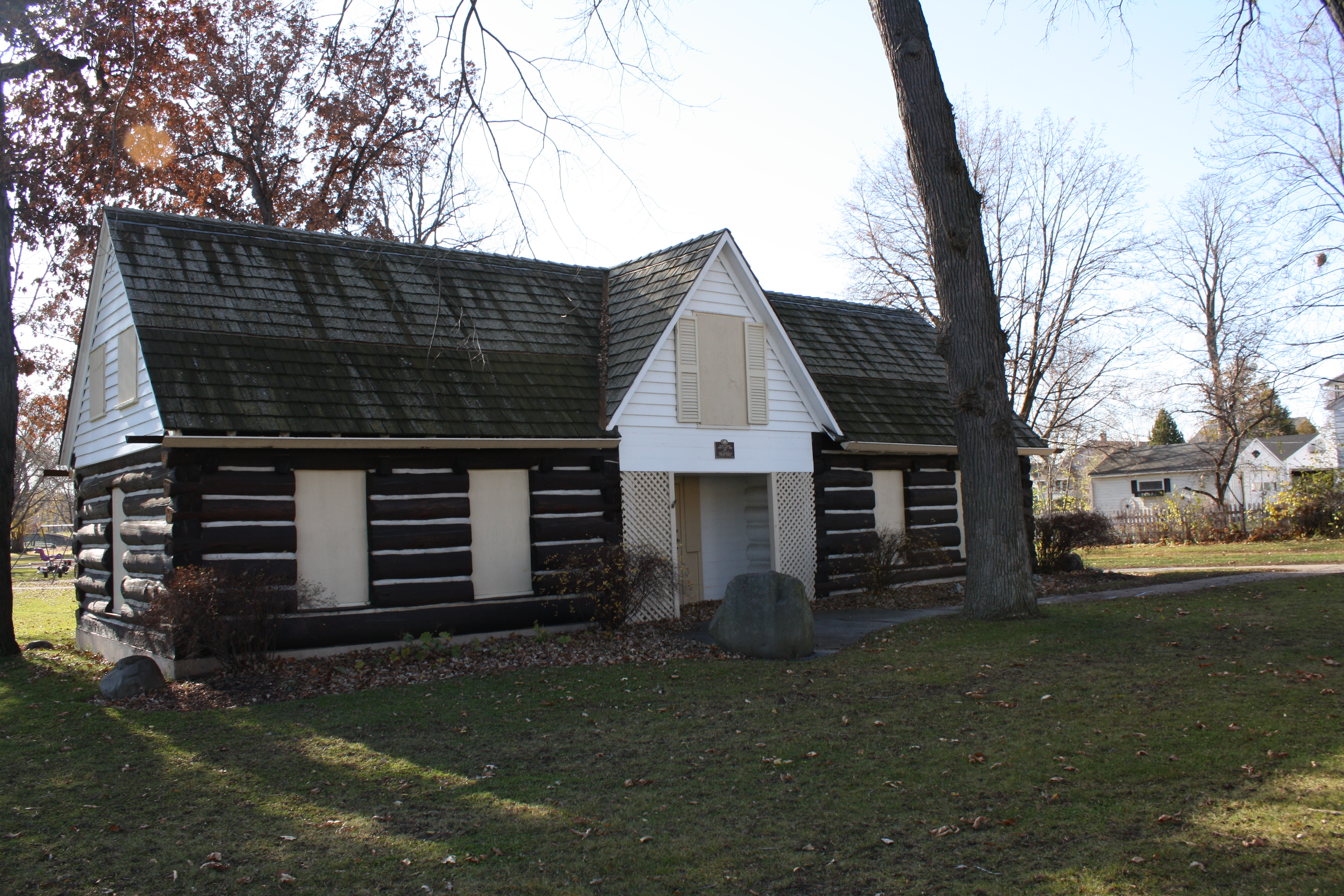
James Duane Doty's house, the "Grand Loggery"

== History ==
The Ho-Chunk chief Glory of the Morning lived in a village on Doty Island in the 18th and 19th centuries.

It was given the name Doty Island after James Duane Doty (1799–1865), Governor of the Wisconsin Territory (1841–1844), and a two-term member of Congress (1849–1853). Following his service in the nation's capital, Doty retired to his "Grand Loggery" home on the island near its southern shore, in present-day Doty Park in Neenah.

The Menasha plant (1911) of Banta Corporation (1901–2006) was located on Doty Island along Ahnaip Street; its headquarters were located there until 1988. The company was founded nearby at the Banta House at 348 Naymut Street, which is on the National Register of Historic Places.
