= Mildred Cotton Council =

American restaurateur and cookbook author

Mildred Cotton Council (April 1929 – May 20, 2018) aka Mama Dip, was an American restaurateur and cookbook author. She was the founder of Mama Dip's restaurant in North Carolina. Her book Mama Dip's Kitchen was rated one of the 100 best cookbooks of all time by Southern Living magazine.

Her signature dishes included pecan pie and fried chicken.

== Biography ==
The youngest daughter of seven children, she earned the nickname Dip as a child because her arms were long enough to reach the bottom of the family's water barrel. As an adult, her full height was 6’1”. Her children began calling her Mama Dip.

She was a native of Chatham County, North Carolina and the granddaughter of an enslaved person; her parents were Ed and Effie Edwards Cotton.

She married Joe Council in 1948 and went to work in the Council family restaurant Bill's Barbecue Restaurant. They had eight children, and in the 1970s, they divorced.

A popular story about the founding of Mama Dip's restaurant in November 1976 was that she used $64 from the money she earned as a cook and maid in Chapel Hill, North Carolina.,

The then US President George W. Bush invited her to the White House, and she later exchanged letters with President Barack Obama and his wife Michelle.

She died due to complications from a stroke a month after her 89th birthday.

Her granddaughter, Tonya, opened Tonya's Cookie Company across from Mama Dip's in Chapel Hill. Another granddaughter, baker and cookbook author Erika Council, owns and operates Bomb Biscuits in Atlanta.

== Writing ==
The New York Times restaurant critic Craig Claiborne encouraged her to write a cookbook, but since she never wrote down her recipes, Mama Dip’s Kitchen took ten years of work before being issued in 1999 and sold 250,000 copies. She wrote another cookbook called Mama Dip’s Family Cookbook and sold a line of food products, including cornbread, poppy seed salad dressing and barbecue sauce.
