= Banta Corporation =

American printing and publishing company

Coordinates: 44.201°N 88.447°W

- Type: Public
- Traded as: NYSE: BN (1998–2006); Nasdaq: BNTA (1971–98)
- Industry: Commercial printing
- Founded: 1901; 125 years ago
- Founder: George Banta (1857–1935)
- Defunct: 2006; 20 years ago
- Fate: acquired by RR Donnelley
- Headquarters: 225 Main Street (1992–2006); Menasha, Wisconsin, U.S.
- Key people: Stephanie Streeter, CEO
- Products: Books, catalogs, financial documents, magazines, direct mail, labels, retail inserts
- Revenue: $1.5 billion (2005)
- Number of employees: 8,000

Location in the United States
Location in Wisconsin

Banta Corporation was a major printing, imaging, and supply chain management company of the United States, based in Menasha, Wisconsin, for all of its 105 years. Founded in 1901, it was acquired by Chicago-based RR Donnelley in late 2006.

== History ==
George Banta (1857–1935) began printing forms while working as an insurance agent. In 1901, he opened a storefront and formed the George Banta Printing Company, two years later it was renamed the George Banta Publishing Company. Banta's Menasha home, where he started the company, is listed on the National Register of Historic Places.

Much of the company's early growth came from educational contracts. George Banta, a member of Phi Delta Theta fraternity at Indiana University in Bloomington, secured a contract to print its national magazine, The Scroll. Other national fraternities and sororities followed; the company would also publish Banta's Greek Exchange, a monthly review of fraternity and sorority news, and several editions of Baird's Manual of American College Fraternities. George's late father, David Demaree Banta (1833–1896), was dean of the Indiana University School of Law, and through this connection the company also won orders for university catalogs and yearbooks, textbooks, and magazines. The elder Banta had helped found the Phi Delta Theta fraternity. In 1910, the company moved to a new building in Menasha at 460 Ahnaip Street on Doty Island, where its headquarters remained until the late 1980s.

Russell Sharp, brother-in-law of George Banta, Jr., created an elementary school workbook in the 1920s and turned to Banta Publishing to print it. Its expertise in publishing them helped make it a leader in the production of other softcover books, and Banta had a long-term relationship with Scott Foresman. A second plant opened in 1946, located about two miles (3 km) north at 800 Midway Road. In 1954, the company adopted the name George Banta Company, Inc. and in 1971 it went public, traded on NASDAQ as BNTA. In 1989, Banta broke into the Fortune 500 and officially changed its name to Banta Corporation. After 27 years on NASDAQ, it moved to the New York Stock Exchange (NYSE) on December 18, 1998, where it traded under the symbol BN for the next eight years.

Starting in 1969, Banta began a program of acquisitions of imaging and printing-related companies as well as manufacturers of packaging, paper products, and display equipment. It also diversified within its print business, printing catalogs, trade books, and the Selchow and Righter board game Trivial Pursuit.

As the printing industry declined in the early 21st century, Banta spun off several units to focus on its core businesses. In August 2006, Connecticut-based envelope printer Cenveo made an unsolicited offer to buy the company, but Banta's management considered it hostile. (Banta's stock price had recently fallen after the disastrous August 2006 earning call when Streeter announced Banta was going to refocus on print instead of supply chain and when questioned about the shift she replied "we didn't see it coming" - from the low $40s in late July; it closed at a penny under $34 on August 8, but the news shot the price up to $46 the following day.) Instead, it accepted a $1.3 billion offer from major competitor RR Donnelley of Chicago in October, at $52.50 cash per share ($36.50 plus a $16 special dividend).

== Family company ==
Founder Banta remained president until his death in 1935 at age 78. His wife Nellie (1866–1951), who ran day-to-day operations from 1904 to 1911, assumed the presidency afterwards until her death. Their son, George Banta, Jr. (1893–1977), joined the company in 1911 and served as president from 1951 to 1961. In 1965, George Banta Jr.'s son George "Bud" Banta III (1923–2005) took over, stepping aside to become chairman in 1971, where he remained until 1983.

Banta's final chairman & CEO in 2006 was Stephanie Streeter; two years earlier, she had succeeded Donald Belcher (1938–2018), who led the company for a decade (1994–2004).

== Menasha facilities today ==
The venerable Menasha plant on Doty Island, along the west side of Ahnaip Street, continued under RR Donnelley until 2011; operations were then consolidated and moved a few miles north to the Midway plant. After several years unoccupied, the Ahnaip property was acquired by the city in 2018 for mixed-use redevelopment. Most of the structures were demolished in 2020, but the newer portion at the southern end was retained and remodeled into apartments (Banta Village).

After 78 years of service, the Midway plant closed in 2024, was sold, and became a general warehouse facility. Banta's final headquarters (1992–2006) at 225 Main Street was remodeled into luxury apartments (Discovery Point). The previous headquarters (1988–1992) at 130 Main Street (then Harbour Place) was also remodeled into apartments (Harbor Lofts).
