= George Banta =

American publisher and politician (1857–1935)

- Born: George Riddle Banta; July 16, 1857; Covington, Kentucky, US
- Died: September 23, 1935 (aged 78); Menasha, Wisconsin, US
- Education: Franklin College
- Occupation: Publisher
- Years active: 1901–1935
- Employer: George Banta Printing Company

George Riddle Banta Sr. (July 16, 1857 – September 23, 1935) was an American publisher and local politician. He was the founder of the George Banta Company (later the Banta Corporation) and was an influential figure in the development of the collegiate Phi Delta Theta fraternity and Delta Gamma women's fraternity.

== Early life ==
George Riddle Banta was born in Covington, Kentucky on July 16, 1857. His father, David Demaree Banta (1833–1896), was a trustee of Indiana University in Bloomington and was the first dean of its School of Law.

Banta attended Franklin College in Franklin, Indiana, where he became an active member of Phi Delta Theta. He graduated in 1876.

== Career ==
Banta was admitted to the Indiana bar in 1878. He moved to Menasha, Wisconsin around 1885, where in 1901 he established the George Banta Printing Company. He remained active in the management of the company until his death on September 23, 1935.

Much of the company's early growth came from educational contracts. George Banta secured a contract to print the national magazine for Phi Delta Theta. Other national fraternities and sororities followed; the company would also publish Banta's Greek Exchange, a monthly review of fraternity and sorority news, and several editions of Baird's Manual of American College Fraternities. Through his father's academic connections, the company also won orders for university catalogs and yearbooks, textbooks, and magazines.

Banta served as alderman (1890–1891) and mayor (1892, 1895, 1902–1903) of Menasha, and served on the boards of several local companies.

== Greek system involvement ==
Banta was elected, by unanimous consent, as the first president of the general council of Phi Delta Theta at the 1880 convention at the Grand Hotel in Indianapolis. Banta, at the young age of 23 when elected, went on to serve as president through 1882. He also served as national historian of Phi Delta Theta and was highly instrumental in developing the fraternity's ritual, governing structure, General Council, provinces, province presidents, expansion to new campuses for countless chapters, and The Scroll magazine. For his contributions, he is recognized as one of two "Second Founders" of Phi Delt, along with Walter B. Palmer.

Banta was instrumental in establishing the first Delta Gamma chapter outside the Southern United States, at his alma mater. The chapter was designated the "Phi" in honor of Phi Delta Theta, and Banta was made an honorary member—the only man ever initiated into the women's fraternity. Delta Gamma paid special tribute to Banta when the Delta Gamma Foundation established the George Banta Memorial Fellowship for 1957–58.

Banta supported the Greek system throughout his life, attending early meetings of the National Panhellenic Conference and the National Interfraternity Conference. Banta also encouraged the formation of new Greek letter organizations. Emily Butterfield, a co-founder of Alpha Gamma Delta contracted as a designer for the company, is credited as designer or co-designer of the coats of arms of Alpha Gamma Delta, Lambda Omega, Phi Beta, Sigma Delta Rho, Sigma Tau Gamma, Tau Kappa Epsilon, Theta Kappa Nu, Theta Phi Alpha, Theta Upsilon Omega, and Zeta Tau Alpha. He also encouraged her to publish articles she had compiled concerning fraternity and sorority heraldry, released in 1931 as College Fraternity Heraldry. Furthermore, he was elected an honorary member of the Alpha chapter of Phi Mu Alpha Sinfonia fraternity, the national fraternity for men in music, at the New England Conservatory on December 20, 1917.

== Personal life ==
Banta was married to Lillian Vawter in 1882, who died in 1885, leaving a young son, Mark. After her death, Banta moved to Menasha, Wisconsin, where he later married Ellen Lee Plesants (1866–1951). They had two more children, George Jr. (1893–1977), and Eleanor Banta. Both sons became members of Phi Delta Theta. George Jr. followed in his father's footsteps and served as president of the Phi Delta Theta Grand Council from 1932 until 1934. Eleanor became a member of Delta Gamma.

He died at age 78 in 1935 in Menasha, and was buried at Oak Hill Cemetery in neighboring Neenah. His former home at 348 Naymut Street, known as the George, Sr., and Ellen Banta House, is listed on the National Register of Historic Places.
