= Mama Dip's =

American traditional Southern country cooking restaurant

Coordinates: 35.9115°N 79.0633°W

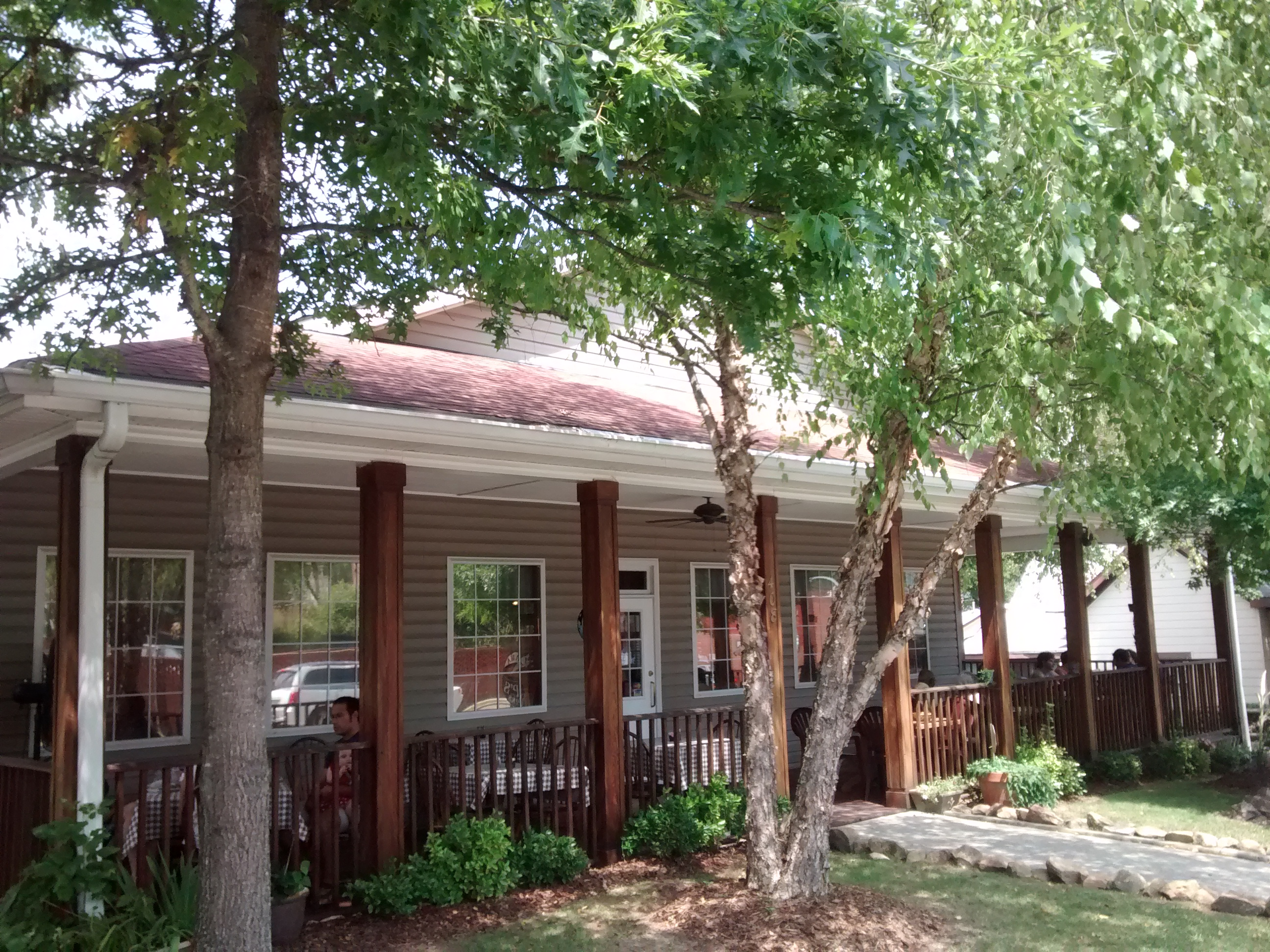
Mama Dip's

Mama Dip's is a traditional Southern country cooking restaurant located in Chapel Hill, North Carolina in the United States. It was founded by Mildred Cotton Council in 1976. The restaurant serves breakfast, lunch, and dinner, and offers a take-home menu. They sell items such as barbecue sauce, poppy seed dressing, pecan pie, souvenirs and apparel at the restaurant’s general store. "Mama Dip" (Mildred Council) also distributes her barbecue sauce and dressings to local specialty foods shops.

== History ==
Mildred Cotton Council, better known as "Mama Dip," founded and owned the restaurant. She earned the name "Dip" as a child from her siblings because of her ability to use her height and long arms to "dip" into the bottom of a rain barrel.

Mama Dip learned to cook by watching her family members. She is known for her "dump" cooking style.

== Other work ==
Council has written two books: Mama Dip's Kitchen and Mama Dip's Family Cookbook. Her books share recipes as well as stories about her life in food. She has been featured on Good Morning America and on the Food Network's Cooking Live. She said, referring to Mama Dip's Kitchen, that if it were not for the restaurant, then she would have not put her books together.

Council died on May 20, 2018, after a period of ill health.
