= Baird's Manual of American College Fraternities =

North American compendium of fraternities and sororities

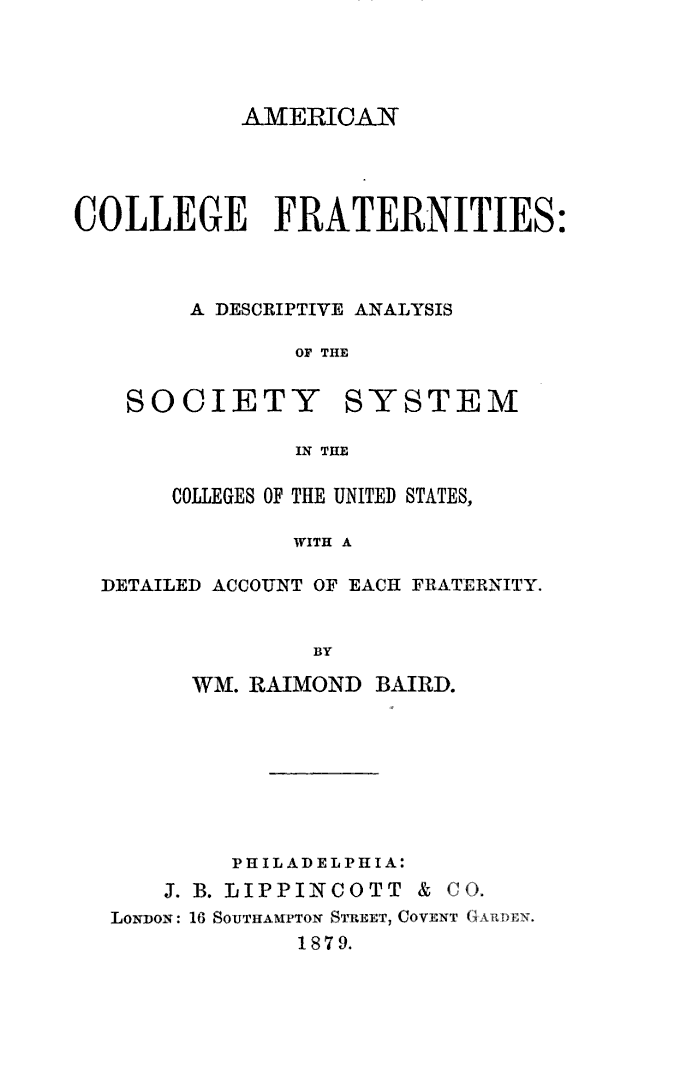
- Edited by: William Raimond Baird, James T. Brown, Francis Wayland Shepardson, John Robson, and others
- Original title: American College Fraternities
- Country: United States
- Language: English
- Genre: Reference
- Published: 1879 - 1991
- Media type: Print
- No. of books: 20
- Followed by: Almanac of Fraternities and Sororities

Baird's Manual of American College Fraternities was a compendium of fraternities and sororities in the United States and Canada, published between 1879 and 1991. One modern writer notes, "Baird's Manual of American College Fraternities, was, in essence, the Bible of the Greek letter system."

== History ==
While seeking a Greek organization as a merger partner for his small national fraternity of Alpha Sigma Chi (which later joined Beta Theta Pi) at Stevens Institute of Technology, William Raimond Baird conducted extensive research on fraternal organizations. He compiled and published his research as American College Fraternities: A Descriptive Analysis of the Society System in the Colleges of the United States, with a Detailed Account of Each Fraternity in 1879.

Baird's publication coincided with a period of immense growth for fraternities in the United States. His book was in demand for libraries and fraternity chapters, the latter contacting Baird with updates to their entry. Baird published eight editions of the reference through 1915. With the sixth edition in 1905, the serial was renamed Baird's Manual of American College Fraternities.

After Baird died in 1917, the National Interfraternity Conference held the rights to his manual which continued publishing with an erratic schedule and various editors and publishers. James T. Browne served as editor and publisher of the 9th edition in 1920 and the 10th edition in 1923.

In the 1920s, the National Interfraternity Conference sold the serial to George Banta, publisher and editor-in-chief of Banta's Greek Exchange. Banta was a former president and secondary–founder of Phi Delta Theta. His George Banta Publishing Company (later George Banta Company, Inc.) of Menasha, Wisconsin released eight editions of Baird's Manual between 1927 and 1968. Banta hired Francis Wayland Shepardson, president of Beta Theta Pi, to edit three editions, the 11th edition in 1927, the 12th edition in 1930, and the 13th edition in 1935. Banta died in March 1936, and his company's leadership fell to his widow and son.

During the 1940s, Banta Publishing made the publication slimmer with fewer entries. Alvan E Duerr was the first editor of this new format with the 14th edition in 1940. Harold J. Bailey edited the 15th edition that was released in 1949. George Starr Lasher edited the 16th edition in 1957. John Robson edited Baird's Manual for its last two editions with George Banta Company, the 17th edition in 1963 and the 18th edition in 1968.

In the 1970s, Banta transferred rights to the serial to the Baird's Manual Foundation. The foundation published the 19th edition in 1977 with Robson continuing as editor. Jack Anson of Phi Kappa Tau and Robert F. Marchesani Jr. of Phi Kappa Psi edited the 20th edition for the foundation. Released in 1991, it was the last edition.

== Description ==
Baird's Manual covered national and international collegiate social, professional, and honor fraternities, including active and defunct organizations. A typical entry included an overview of a society's history, traditions, symbols, chapters their founding dates, and membership information. Organizations contacted Baird with updates to their entry. However, there was such a boom in the growth of Greek organizations, both local and national, that Baird struggled to update the entries and add new content for each edition. In essence, each volume was outdated before it was published.

The first ten editions included high school fraternities, literary fraternities, and local societies that had developed permanence by owning property or merging into another fraternity. With the 7th edition, Baird stopped including secondary school organizations.

In 1940, a slimmer version was published, omitting local chapters and secret societies. In future editions in the 1940s, editors cut literary societies and classes from the publication. By the 1963 edition, only national social (general), professional, and honorary organizations were listed, along with short profiles for defunct national groups. Baird's Manual also listed postsecondary schools with their active and inactive chapters. This remained the format through the final print editions.

== Subsequent publication ==
When Baird's Manual ceased publication in 1991, Carrol Lurding of Delta Upsilon created a new resource, Almanac of Fraternities and Sororities. The Student Life & Culture Archives at the University of Illinois Library published it digitally c. 2020. This free resource is inspired by Baird's Manual but does not duplicate the content found in the original serial. The Almanac resulted from decades of research with resources including fraternity and sorority publications, yearbooks, the New York Public Library, the Baird Collection, the University of Illinois Library's Student Life & Culture Archives, and Indiana University's Lurding Collection of Fraternity Material at the Lilly Library. Thus, it is more comprehensive than Baird's Manual. In addition, the Almanac of Fraternities and Sororities is updated monthly and accepts corrections and additions through its website.

== Editions ==
- Baird, William Raimond, ed. American College Fraternities, 1st edition. Philadelphia: J. B. Lippincott & Co.,1879.
- Baird, William Raimond, ed. American College Fraternities, 2nd edition, 1880.
- Baird, William Raimond, ed. American College Fraternities, 2nd revised edition(known as the 3rd edition). New York: Frank Williams, 1883. (also available at hdl:2027/njp.32101066999960 )
- Baird, William Raimond, ed. American College Fraternities, 4th edition. New York: James P. Downs, 1890.
- Baird, William Raimond, ed. American College Fraternities, 5th edition. New York: Wm. Raimond Baird, 1898.
- Baird, William Raimond, ed. Baird's Manual of American College Fraternities, 6th edition. New York: The Alcolm Company, 1905.
- Baird, William Raimond, ed. Baird's Manual of American College Fraternities, 7th edition. New York: The College Fraternity Publishing Co., 1912.
- Baird, William Raimond, ed. Baird's Manual of American College Fraternities, 8th edition. New York: The College Fraternity Publishing Co., 1915.
- Brown, James T., ed. Baird's Manual of American College Fraternities, 9th edition. New York: James T. Brown Publisher, 1920.
- Brown, James T., ed. Baird's Manual of American College Fraternities, 10th edition. New York: James T. Brown Publisher, 1923.
- Shepardson, Francis Wayland, ed. Baird's Manual of American College Fraternities, 11th edition. Menasha, Wisconsin: The Collegiate Press/George Banta Publishing Company, 1927.
- Shepardson, Francis Wayland, ed. Baird's Manual of American College Fraternities, 12th edition. Menasha, Wisconsin: The Collegiate Press/George Banta Publishing Company, 1930.
- Shepardson, Francis Wayland, ed. Baird's Manual of American College Fraternities, 13th edition. Menasha, Wisconsin: The Collegiate Press/George Banta Publishing Company, 1935.
- Duerr, Alvan E., ed. Baird's Manual of American College Fraternities, 14th edition. Menasha, Wisconsin: The Collegiate Press/George Banta Publishing Company, 1940.
- Baily, Harold J, ed. Baird's Manual of American College Fraternities, 15th edition. Menasha, Wisconsin: George Banta Publishing Company, 1949.
- Lasher, George Starr, ed. Baird's Manual of American College Fraternities, 16th edition. Menasha, Wisconsin: George Banta Co., 1957.
- Robson, John, ed. Baird's Manual of American College Fraternities, 17th edition. Menasha, Wisconsin: George Banta Co., 1963.
- Robson, John, ed. Baird's Manual of American College Fraternities, 18th edition. Menasha, Wisconsin: George Banta Co., 1968.
- Robson, John, ed. Baird's Manual of American College Fraternities, 19th edition. Menasha, Wisconsin: Baird's Manual Foundation, 1977.
- Anson, Jack L. and Marchesani Jr. Robert F., eds. Baird's Manual of American College Fraternities, 20th edition Indianapolis: Baird's Manual Foundation, 1991 ISBN 0-9637159-0-9

== See also ==
- Banta's Greek Exchange
- The Sorority Handbook
