= Emily Helen Butterfield =

American architect

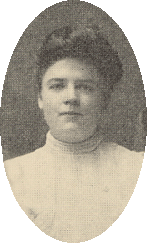
- Emily Butterfield as ΑΓΔ sister at SU,
- Born: August 4, 1884; Algonac, Michigan, US
- Died: March 22, 1958; Michigan, US
- Education: Syracuse University
- Occupation: Architect

Emily Helen Butterfield (August 4, 1884, Algonac, Michigan – March 22, 1958, Neebish Island) was a pioneer in the Michigan women's movement.

She was Michigan's first licensed female architect, one of the founders of the Alpha Gamma Delta sorority, active in Greek life, and a founding member of the Detroit Business Women's Club, the first professional women's club in the nation.

== Early life ==
Butterfield was born in Algonac, Michigan, in St. Clair County. She attended Detroit Public Schools. Butterfield and her father shared a great love of art. In her teenage years she and her father went on sketch trips to the western United States and Europe.

== Career ==
=== Architecture ===
In 1903, Butterfield was accepted into the architecture program at Syracuse University in New York. After graduation, in 1907 she became the first licensed woman architect in the state of Michigan. With her father, in 1917 she established the firm of Butterfield and Butterfield. The firm specialized in church architecture. It led the transformation of churches, especially Methodist, from Sunday meeting halls to centers of daily community and social activities. She practiced architecture in Detroit and Pontiac, designing 26 churches throughout the state. Her other projects included factories, summer camps, stores, schools, and homes.

=== Detroit Business Women's Club and the BPW ===
Butterfield was among the three co-founders, along with publisher Emma Spoor, and manufacturer's agent Grace Wright, of the Detroit Business Women's Club in 1912. It was the first professional women's club in the nation and Butterfield served as founding president.

"I think it never occurred to us that we were doing something absolutely unique, I know I never would have had the idea if it had not been that all of my business acquaintances were men, and I was actually lonesome for speaking acquaintances with business women as I pattered up and down the avenue at the noon hour looking for a place where a lone woman might eat." --Emily Butterfield

In a series of mergers, the Club became part of what is now known as BPW/Michigan. This chapter is a part of Business and Professional Women (BPW), the oldest and largest organization for working women in the world. The national BPW organization is made up of federations from each of the 50 states, the District of Columbia, Puerto Rico, and the Virgin Islands.

=== Greek activities ===
Arms of the ΑΓΔ fraternity, designed by Butterfield

Butterfield was active in the college Greek movement, which flourished with new chapters established in the early 20th century with the expansion of college education. As an associate of the George Banta publishing company, Butterfield combined her design abilities and her knowledge of heraldry to design the coats of arms of several sororities and fraternities, among them her own sorority, Alpha Gamma Delta (ΑΓΔ), coat of arms in the spring of 1906. She also designed the coats of arms for Lambda Omega (later merged with Delta Zeta), Theta Phi Alpha, and Phi Beta sororities. She co-designed the Zeta Tau Alpha sorority coat of arms and the crest of Tau Kappa Epsilon.

Butterfield designed the coats of arms for the following fraternities: Alpha Kappa Psi, Sigma Delta Rho, Sigma Tau Gamma, Theta Upsilon Omega (later merged with Sigma Phi Epsilon), and Theta Kappa Nu (later merged with Lambda Chi Alpha). With George Banta, she created the coat-of-arms (adopted in 1910) of Phi Mu Alpha Sinfonia fraternity, the national fraternity for men in music.

She designed the chapter houses of Alpha Gamma Delta at Syracuse and Michigan State universities. When the fraternity established a summer camp (the "Alpha Gamma Delta Summer Camp Lodges") for underprivileged children in Jackson, Michigan in 1920, Butterfield was the architect of the camp. She also served as camp manager until 1924. She served as editor of the Alpha Gamma Delta Quarterly, the fraternity publication, for 7 years.

Butterfield had a strong influence on her sorority and Greek life, as noted in the 2004 Alpha Gamma Delta Centennial Keynote Address:

"In the United States in 1900, three-quarters of the states forbade married women to own property in their name. In 1909, the members of Alpha Gamma Delta overlooked the statistic and planned ahead by starting a house fund in hopes of purchasing their own home. In 1928, they challenged the societal constraints once again by not only purchasing but building the first house — and we all know the name of the architect — Emily Helen Butterfield."

=== Publications ===
Butterfield and her father shared a love for, and studied the art of, heraldry. Following creating many heraldry designs for fraternal organizations, she also wrote College Fraternity Heraldry, published in 1931.

To further education in architecture, she published a children's book, Young People's History of Architecture (1933). She also contributed its illustrations, which she had drawn from her many travels.

=== Art ===
Butterfield was an accomplished illustrator, working in pen and ink and watercolor, illustrating mainly nature, Michigan, and architectural scenes. She exhibited at the J. L. Hudson Gallery and at the Toledo Artists Club. Her artwork was used in her publications.

== Retirement and death ==
Butterfield retired to Neebish Island, where she served as postmaster during World War II. She died on March 22, 1958 and was inducted into the Michigan Women's Hall of Fame for her work in the field of architecture in 1990.
