= Bibliography of college fraternities and sororities =

This is a bibliography of literature dealing with the college fraternities and sororities. If there is a template for using the book as a citation in Wikipedia, it is linked with (τ) afterwards.

== Books ==
- Addicks, Trisha. ThΣ Rush BiblΣ: Secrets to Crush Sorority Recruitment and Find Your Forever Greek Home. New York: Simon & Schuster, 2026. ISBN 9781668217085.
- The Administration of Fraternal Organizations on North American Campuses: A Pattern for the New Millennium. Dennis E. Gregory, editor. Asheville: College Administration Publications, 2003. ISBN 978-0912557274.
- Affirming Identity, Advancing Belonging, and Amplifying Voice in Sororities and Fraternities. Pietro A. Sasso, Mónica Lee Miranda, and J. Patrick Biddix, editors. Leeds: Emerald Publishing Limited, 2024. ISBN 9781806600861.
- African American Fraternities and Sororities: The Legacy and the Vision (1st ed.). Tamara L. Brown, Gregory S. Parks, Clarenda M. Phillips, editors. Lexington: University Press of Kentucky. 2005. ISBN 978-0-8131-2344-8. (τ)
- African American Fraternities and Sororities: The Legacy and the Vision. (2nd ed.) Tamara L. Brown, Gregory S. Parks, and Clarenda M. Phillips, editors. Lexington: University Press of Kentucky, 2010. ISBN 978-0813129655. (τ)
- Black Greek-letter Organizations in the Twenty-First Century: Our Fight Has Just Begun. Gregory S. Parks, editor. Lexington: University of Kentucky Press, 2008. ISBN 978-0813124919. (τ)
- Black Greek-letter Organizations 2.0: New Directions in the Study of African American Fraternities and Sororities. Matthew W. Hughey and Gregory S. Parks, editors. Jackson: University Press of Mississippi, 2011. ISBN 9781604739213.
- Bradley, Anthony B. Heroic Fraternities: How College Men Can Save Universities and America. Eugene: Wipf & Stock Publishers, 2023. ISBN 9781666715538.
- Blanchard, Charles A. Modern Secret Societies, 7th edition. Chicago: National Christian Association, 1915.
- Brothers and Sisters: Diversity in College Fraternities and Sororities. Craig L. Torbenson and Gregory S. Parks, editors. Madison: Fairleigh Dickinson University Press, 2009. ISBN 978-1611474022. (τ)
- Butterfield, Emily H. College Fraternity Heraldry. Menasha, Wisconsin: The Collegiate Press/George Banta Publishing Company, 1931. LCCN 31-21294. (τ)
- DeSantis, Alan D. Inside Greek U: Fraternities, Sororities, and the Pursuit of Pleasure, Power, and Prestige. Louisville: University Press of Kentucky, 2007. ISBN 9780813138596.
- Freeman, Margaret L. Women of Discriminating Taste: White Sororities and the Making of American Ladyhood. Athens: University of Georgia Press, 2000. ISBN 978-0820358161.
- Foundations, Research, and Assessment of Fraternities and Sororities: Retrospective and Future Considerations. Pietro A. Sasso, J. Patrick Biddix, and Mónica Lee Miranda, editors. Gorham: Myers Education Press, 2019. ISBN 9781975502652.
- Giddings, Paula. In Search of Sisterhood: Delta Sigma Theta and the Challenge of the Black Sorority Movement. New York: William Morrow & Co., 1988. ISBN 978-0688057756.
- Graebner, Theodore. A Handbook of Organizations: Their Relation to the Church. Saint Louis: Concordia Publishing House, 1948. LCCN 49-14011.
- Hechinger, John. True Gentlemen: The Broken Pledge of America’s Fraternities. New York: PublicAffairs, 2017. ISBN 978-1610396820.
- Jacobs, Albert P. Greek-Letter Societies. Detroit: Gulley Printing House, 1879. LCCN 12-4369.
- Johnson, Fred Sanford. Fraternities in Our Colleges. New York: National Interfraternity Foundation, 1972. LCCN 72-85676.
- Jones, Ricky L. Black Haze: Violence, Sacrifice, and Manhood in Black Greek-letter Fraternities. Albany: State University of New York Press, 2015. ISBN 9781438456720.
- Kimbrough, Walter, M. Black Greek 101: The Culture, Customs, and Challenges of Black Fraternities and Sororities. Madison: Fairleigh Dickinson University Press, 2003. ISBN 978-1611472813.
- The Law of Fraternities and Sororities. Gregory S. Parks, editor. Durham, North Carolina: Carolina Academic Press, 2024. ISBN 978-1-5310-2625-7.
- Laybourn, Wendy and Goss, Devon. Diversity in Black Greek Letter Organizations: Breaking the Line. New York: Routledge Taylor & Francis Group, 2018. ISBN 9781138629622.
- Mathews, Jana. The Benefits of Friends: Inside the Complicated World of Today's Sororities and Fraternities. Chapel Hill: University of North Carolina Press, 2022. ISBN 978-1469672106.
- Miller, Chris. The Real Animal House: The Awesomely Depraved Saga of the Fraternity That Inspired the Movie. New York: Little, Brown and Company, 2006. ISBN 978-0316057011.
- Moving Culturally-Based Sororities and Fraternities Forward. Crystal Garcia and Antonio Duran, editors. New York: Peter Lang, 2021. ISBN 9781433188244.
- New Challenges for Greek Letter Organizations: Transforming Fraternities and Sororities into Learning Communities. Edward P. Whipple, editor. San Francisco: Jossey-Bass Publishers, 1998.
- Nuwer, Hank. Wrongs of Passage: Fraternities, Sororities, Hazing, and Binge Drinking. Bloomington: Indiana University Press, 2001. ISBN 9780253214980.
- Out on Fraternity Row: Personal Accounts of Being Gay in a College Fraternity. Shane L. Windmeyer and Pamela W. Freeman. New York: Alyson Books, 1998. ISBN 9781555834098.
- Parks, Gregory S. and Hughey, Matthew W. A Pledge with Purpose: Black Sororities and Fraternities and the Fight for Equality. New York: New York University Press, 2020. ISBN 9781479859634.
- Robbins, Alexandra. Pledged: The Secret Life of Sororities. New York: Hyperion, 2004. ISBN 9781401300463.
- Robbins, Alexandra. Fraternity: An Inside Look at a Year of College Boys Becoming Men. New York: E. P. Dutton, 2015. ISBN 978-1101986721.
- Robson, Barbara Reid. House Management Problems of Fraternities and Sororities. New York: Teachers College, Columbia University, 1933.
- Ross, Lawrence. Blackballed: The Black and White Politics of Race on America's Campuses. New York: St. Martin's Press, 2016. ISBN 978-1250079114.
- Ross Jr., Lawrence C. The Divine Nine: The History of African American Fraternities and Sororities. New York: Kensington Publishing Corp., 2000. ISBN 978-1575664910.
- Sanua, Marianne Rachel. Going Greek: Jewish College Fraternities in the United States, 1895-1945. Detroit: Wayne State University Press, 2003. ISBN 978-0814328576. (τ)
- Scott, William A. and Scott, Ruth. Values and Organizations: A Study of Fraternities and Sororities. Chicago: Rand McNally & Company, 1965.
- Secret Sisters: Stories of Being Lesbian and Bisexual in a College Sorority. Shane L. Windmeyer and Pamela W. Freeman, editors. Los Angeles: Alyson Books, 2001. ISBN 9781555835880.
- Sheldon, Henry D. Student Life and Traditions. New York: D. Appleton & Company, 1901.
- Supporting Fraternities and Sororities in the Contemporary Era. Pietro A. Sasso, J. Patrick Biddix, and Mónica Lee Miranda, editors. Gorham: Myers Education Press, 2019. ISBN 9781975502690.
- A Survey of the National Policies of Professional Fraternities. H. G. Wright, editor. The Professional Interfraternity Conference, April 1934.
- Syrett, Nicholas L. The Company He Keeps: A History of White College Fraternities. Chapel Hill: University of North Carolina Press, 2011. ISBN 978-0807859315.
- Turk, Diana B. Bound By a Mighty Vow: Sisterhood and Women's Fraternities, 1870-1920. New York: New York University Press, 2004. ISBN 978-0814782750.
- Wilkie, Laurie A. The Lost Boys of Zeta Psi: A Historical Archaeology of Masculinity at a University Fraternity. Berkeley: University of California Press, 2010. ISBN 978-0520260597.
- Wright, Esther. Torn Togas: The Dark Side of Campus Greek Life. Minneapolis: Fairview Press, 1996. ISBN 9780925190949.

== Directories and encyclopedias ==
The materials included here are general, not related to one specific fraternity or sorority.

- Anderson, Ellen. Guide to Women's Organizations; a Handbook about National and International Groups. Washington, D.C.: Public Affairs Press, 1949. LCCN 49-11385.
- Heckethorn, Charles William. The Secret Societies of All Ages and Countries, vol. 1 and vol. 2, London: James Hogg, 1875. LCCN 09-9723.
- Heckethorn, Charles William. The Secret Societies of All Ages and Countries: A Comprehensive Account of Upwards of One Hundred and Sixty Secret Organizations, Religious, Political, and Social, from the Most Remote Ages Down to the Present Time. New edition. vol. 1 and vol. 2. London: George Redway, 1897. LCCN 04-33957.
- Leading Greeks: An Encyclopedia of the Workers in the American Fraternities and Sororities. Levere, William C. Levere, editor. Evanston: William C. Levere, 1915. LCCN 15-25981.
- Maxwell, Will J. Fraternity Men of Chicago. Chicago: The Umbenstock Publishing Co., 1898.
- Maxwell, Will J. Greek Letter Men of Central New York South. New York: The College Book Company, 1901.
- Maxwell, Will J. Greek Letter Men of Michigan. New York: The College Book Company, 1901.
- Maxwell, Will J.. Greek Letter Men of New York. New York: The Umbenstock Publishing Co., 1899.
- Maxwell, Will J. Greek Letter Men of New York, South. New York: The College Book Company, 1901.
- Maxwell, Will J. Greek Letter Men of Pittsburgh. New York: The College Book Company, 1901.
- Maxwell, Will J. Greek Letter Men of the Pacific Coast and Rocky Mountain States. New York: The College Book Company, 1903.
- Maxwell, Will J. Greek Letter Men of Washington. New York: The Umbenstock Publishing Co.,1900. LCCN 25-2585.
- Miller, William Van Rensselaer. Select Organizations in the United States. New York: The Knickerbocker Publishing Company, 1896. LCCN 43-33004.
- Musgrove, Wayne M. College Fraternities. New York: The Interfraternity Conference, 1923.
- The National Jewish Blue Book: An Elite Directory Containing Statistical Data, Names and Addresses of Officers and Directors of Local and National Jewish Organizations, and of Members of Greek letter Fraternities and Country Clubs; General Information; Arranged Geographically and Alphabetically. Philadelphia: The Blue Book Publishing Company, 1927. LCCN 27-14924.
- Noble, Franklin. Thoughts for the Occasion, Fraternal and Benevolent; a Reference Manual of Historical Data and Facts. New York: E. B. Treat & Company, 1905. LCCN 05-1180.
- Preuss, Arthur. A Dictionary of Secret and Other Societies St. Louis: B. Herder Book Co., 1924. LCCN 24-9579/
- Professional Fraternities. United States: Professional Interfraternity Conference, 1950.
- Seeley, Isaac Casper. Manual of College Literary Societies, with Statistical Table. Kalamazoo: Chaplin & Ihling Bro's Book and Job Printers, 1871.
- Stevens, Albert C. The Cyclopædia of Fraternities: A Compilation of Existing Authentic Information and the Results of Original Investigation as to more than Six Hundred Secret Societies in the United States. New York: Hamilton Printing and Publishing Company, 1899. LCCN 99-1908. (τ)
- Stevens, Albert C. The Cyclopaedia of Fraternities: A Compilation of Existing Authentic Information and the Results of Original Investigation as to more than Six Hundred Secret Societies in the United States. 2nd edition. New York: E. B. Treat and Company, 1907. LCCN 66-20332. (τ)

== Mongraphs ==
The materials included here are general, not related to one specific fraternity or sorority.

- Biddix, J. Patrick; Matney, Malinda M.; Norman, Eric M.; and Martin, Georgianna L. The Influence of Fraternity and Sorority Involvement: A Critical Analysis of Research (1996 - 2013). ASHE Higher Education Report, vol. 39, no. 6 (2014), pp. 1–156. doi:10.1002/aehe.20012. ISBN 9781118866993.

== Periodicals ==
The materials included here are general, not related to one specific fraternity or sorority.

- Banta's Greek Exchange. Menasha, Wisconsin: George Banta Company, Inc., ISSN 0005-5654.
  - vol. 1, no. 1–4 (December 1912 – September 1913)
  - vol. 2, no. 1–4 (December 1913 – September 1914)
  - vol. 3, no. 1–4 (December 1914 – September 1915)
  - vol. 4, no. 1–2 (December 1915 – March 1916)
  - vol. 4, no. no. 3–4 (July 1916 – September 1916)
  - vol. 5, no. 1–2 (December 1916 – March 1917)
  - vol. 5, no. 3–4 (July 1917 – September 1917)
  - vol.6, no. 1–2 (December 1917 – March 1918)
  - vol.6, no. 3–4 (July 1918 – September 1918)
  - vol. 7, no. 1–4 (December 1918 – September 1919)
  - vol. 8, no. 1–4 (December 1919 – September 1920)
  - vol. 9, no. 3 (July 1921)
  - vol. 10, no. 1 (December 1921), no. 2 (March 1922), no. 3 (July 1922), no. 4 (September 1922)
  - vol. 11, no. 1 (January 1923), no. 3 (July 1923), no. 4 (October 1923)
  - vol. 12, no. 1–4 (January 2024 – October 1924)
  - vol. 13, no. 1–4 (January 1925 – October 1925)
  - vol. 14, no. 1 (January 1926), no. 2 (April 1926), no. 3 (Jully 1926), no. 4 (October 1926)
  - vol. 15, no. 1 (January 1927), no. 3 (July 1927), no. 4 (October 1927)
  - vol. 16, no. 1 (January 1928), no. 2 (April 1928), no. 3 (July 1928), no. 4 (October 1928)
  - vol 17, no. 1 (January 1929), no. 3 (July 1929), no. 4 (October 1929)
  - vo. 18, no. 2 (April 1930), no. 4 (October 1930)
- "Colleges with the Most Students in Fraternities". U.S. News & World Report. ISSN 0041-5537
- Cimino, Aldo. 2018. “Fraternity Hazing and the Process of Planned Failure.” Journal of American Studies vol. 52, no. 1 (February 2018), pp. 214–236. doi:10.1017/S0021875816001924. JSTOR 26803546
- The Fraternity Month. Leland Publishers, Inc. 1933–1971.
  - vol. 1, no. 1–vol. 2, no. 4 (October 1933 – May 1935).
- Patton, Tracey Owens. "Jim Crow on Fraternity Row: A Study of the Phenomenon of Blackface in the White Southern Fraternal Order". Visual Communication Quarterly, vol. 15, no. 3 (July–September 2008), pp. 150–168. doi:10.1080/15551390802235503.
- Piper, P. F. "College Fraternities". The Cosmopolitan, vol. 22, no. 6 (April 1897), pp. 641–648.

== Serials ==
The materials included here are general, not related to one specific fraternity or sorority.

- American College Fraternities. LCCN 49-4194. (see also Baird's Manual of American College Fraternities)
  - American College Fraternities, 1st edition. William Raimond Baird, editor. Philadelphia: J. B. Lippincott & Co.,1879. (τ)
  - American College Fraternities, 2nd revised edition (known as the 3rd edition). William Raimond Baird, editor. New York: Frank Williams, 1883. (τ)
  - American College Fraternities, 4th edition. William Raimond Baird, editor. New York: James P. Downs, 1890. (τ)
  - American College Fraternities, 5th edition. William Raimond Baird, editor. New York: Wm. Raimond Baird, 1898. (τ)
- Baird's Manual of American College Fraternities. LCCN 49-4194. (see also American College Fraternities)
  - Baird's Manual of American College Fraternities, 6th edition. William Raimond Baird, editor. New York: The Alcolm Company, 1905. (τ)
  - Baird's Manual of American College Fraternities, 7th edition. William Raimond Baird, editor. New York: The College Fraternity Publishing Co., 1912. (τ)
  - Baird's Manual of American College Fraternities, 8th edition. William Raimond Baird, editor. New York: The College Fraternity Publishing Co., 1915. (τ)8th edition supplement, 1916
  - Baird's Manual of American College Fraternities, 9th edition. James T. Brown, editor. New York: James T. Brown Publisher, 1920. (τ)
  - Baird's Manual of American College Fraternities, 10th edition. James T. Brown, editor. New York: James T. Brown Publisher, 1923. (τ)
  - Baird's Manual of American College Fraternities, 11th edition. Menasha, Wisconsin: The Collegiate Press/George Banta Publishing Company, 1927. (τ)
  - Baird's Manual of American College Fraternities, 12th edition. Francis Wayland Shepardson, editor. Menasha, Wisconsin: The Collegiate Press/George Banta Publishing Company, 1930. (τ)
  - Baird's Manual of American College Fraternities, 13th edition. Francis Wayland Shepardson, editor. Menasha, Wisconsin: The Collegiate Press/George Banta Publishing Company, 1935. (τ)
  - Baird's Manual of American College Fraternities, 14th edition. Alvan E. Duerr, editor. Menasha, Wisconsin: The Collegiate Press/George Banta Publishing Company, 1940. (τ)
  - Baird's Manual of American College Fraternities, 15th edition. Harold J. Baily, editor. Menasha, Wisconsin: George Banta Publishing Company, 1949. (τ)
  - Baird's Manual of American College Fraternities, 16th edition. George Starr Lasher, editor. Menasha, Wisconsin: George Banta Co., 1957. (τ)
  - Baird's Manual of American College Fraternities, 17th edition. John Robson, editor. Menasha, Wisconsin: George Banta Co., 1963. (τ)
  - Baird's Manual of American College Fraternities, 18th edition. John Robson, editor. Menasha, Wisconsin: George Banta Co., 1968. (τ)
  - Baird's Manual of American College Fraternities, 19th edition. John Robson, editor.Menasha, Wisconsin: Baird's Manual Foundation, 1977. (τ)
  - Baird's Manual of American College Fraternities, 20th edition. Jack L. Anson. and Robert F. Marchesani Jr., editors. Indianapolis: Baird's Manual Foundation, 1991 ISBN 0-9637159-0-9. (τ)
- Balfour Blue Book. L.G. Balfour Company.
  - 1928
- Leland's Annual Fraternity-Sorority Directory. Leland Publishers. LCCN 57-1334.
- Martin, Ida Shaw. The Sorority Handbook. Boston, Ida Shaw Martin, Publisher. LCCN 21-7645,
  - 1st edition, 1907 (τ)
  - 2nd edition, 1907 (τ)
  - 3rd edition, 1909 (τ)
  - 4th edition, 1911 (τ)
  - 5th edition (1913/1914) (τ)
  - 6th edition, 1918 (τ)
  - 6th Revised, 1919 (τ)
  - 7th edition, 1921 (τ)
  - 8th edition, 1923 (τ)
  - 11th edition, 1931 (τ)

== Websites ==
The resources included here are general, not related to one specific fraternity or sorority.

- Academic Organizations. Korp! Fraternitas Estica -
- Almanac of Fraternities and Sororities. University Library. Student Life and Culture Archives. University of Illinois Urbana-Champaign. (τ)
- Association of College Honor Socieities
- Association of College Honor Societies Archive
- National APIDA Panhellenic Association
- National Multicultural Greek Council
- National Panhellenic Conference
- National Pan-Hellenic Council
- North American Interfraternity Conference
- Professional Fraternity Association
- Society for the Preservation of Greek Housing
- "What's My Sorority's Flowers". Flowers for Fundraising.
