= College fraternities and sororities =

Social organizations at colleges and universities

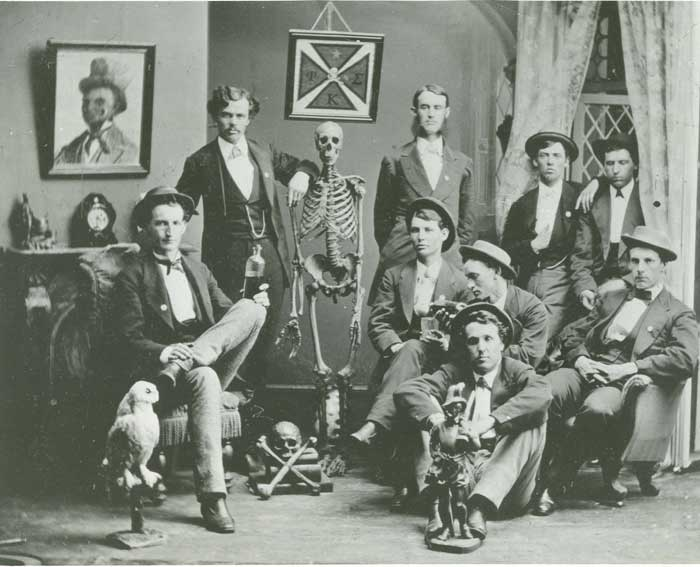
Members of Phi Kappa Sigma at Washington & Jefferson College in Washington, Pennsylvania in 1872

In North America, fraternities and sororities (Latin: fraternitas and sororitas, 'brotherhood' and 'sisterhood') are social clubs at colleges and universities. They are sometimes collectively referred to as Greek life or Greek-letter organizations, as well as collegiate fraternities or collegiate sororities to differentiate them from general, non-university-based fraternal organizations and fraternal orders, friendly societies, or benefit societies.

Generally, membership in a fraternity or sorority is obtained as an undergraduate student but continues thereafter for life by gaining alumni status. Some accept graduate students as well; some also provide honorary membership in certain circumstances. Individual fraternities and sororities vary in organization and purpose, but most – especially the dominant form known as social fraternities and sororities – share five common elements:

1. Secrecy
2. Single-sex membership
3. Selection of new members based on a two-part vetting and probationary process known as rushing and pledging (or orientation)
4. Ownership and occupancy of a residential property where undergraduate members live
5. A set of complex identification symbols that may include Greek letters, armorial achievements, ciphers, badges, grips, hand signs, passwords, flowers, and colors

Fraternities and sororities engage in philanthropic activities; host social events; provide "finishing" training for new members, such as instruction on etiquette, dress, and manners; and create networking opportunities for their newly graduated members. Fraternities and sororities can be tax-exempt 501(c)(7) organizations in the United States.

== History ==
=== Establishment and early history ===
The term "fraternity" is derived from the Latin word frater, which means "brother". Similarly the term "sorority", is derived from the Latin word soror, meaning "sister". However, use of the word sorority began only in 1874, spreading slowly, well after the establishment of the first "women's fraternities", a moniker some groups still use today. As a result, a fraternity can consist of men, women, or a mixture of the two. Members of fraternities and sororities address members of the same organization as "brother" in the case of fraternities or "sister" in the case of sororities.

The first fraternity in North America to incorporate most of the elements of modern fraternities was Phi Beta Kappa, founded at the College of William and Mary in 1776. The founding of Phi Beta Kappa followed the earlier establishment of two other secret student societies on that campus dating back to 1750. In 1779, Phi Beta Kappa expanded to include chapters at Harvard and Yale. By the early 19th century, the organization transformed itself into a scholastic honor society and abandoned secrecy.

==== Social fraternities ====
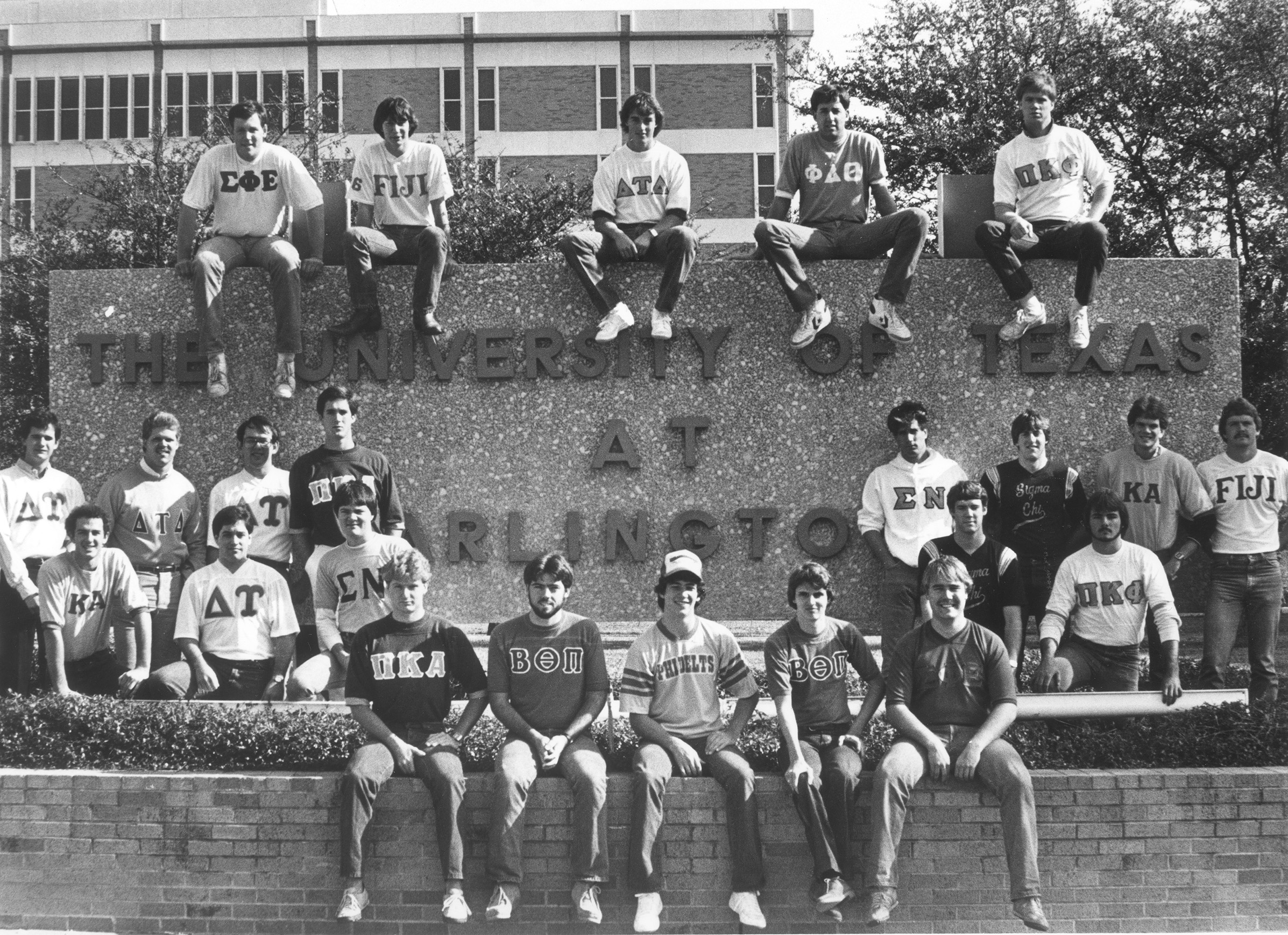
Representatives from different fraternities at the University of Texas at Arlington, c. 1981

In 1825, Kappa Alpha Society, the first fraternity to retain its social characteristic, was established at Union College in Schenectady, New York. In 1827, Sigma Phi and Delta Phi were also founded at the same institution, creating the Union Triad. The further establishment of Psi Upsilon (1833), Omicron Kappa Epsilon (1834), Chi Psi (1841), and Theta Delta Chi (1847) collectively established Union College as the Mother of Fraternities. The social fraternity Chi Phi, officially formed in 1854, traces its roots to a short-lived organization founded at Princeton University in Princeton, New Jersey, in 1824, bearing the same name.

In the 19th century, college fraternities represented the intersection between dining clubs, literary societies, and secret initiatory orders such as Freemasonry. Their early growth was widely opposed by university administrators, though the increasing influence of fraternity alumni, as well as several high-profile court cases, succeeded in largely muting opposition by the 1880s. The first fraternity meeting hall or lodge seems to have been that of the Alpha Epsilon chapter of Chi Psi at the University of Michigan in Ann Arbor, Michigan, in 1845, leading to a tradition in that fraternity to name its buildings "lodges". As fraternity membership was punishable by expulsion at many colleges at this time, the house was located deep in the woods.

==== Social sororities ====
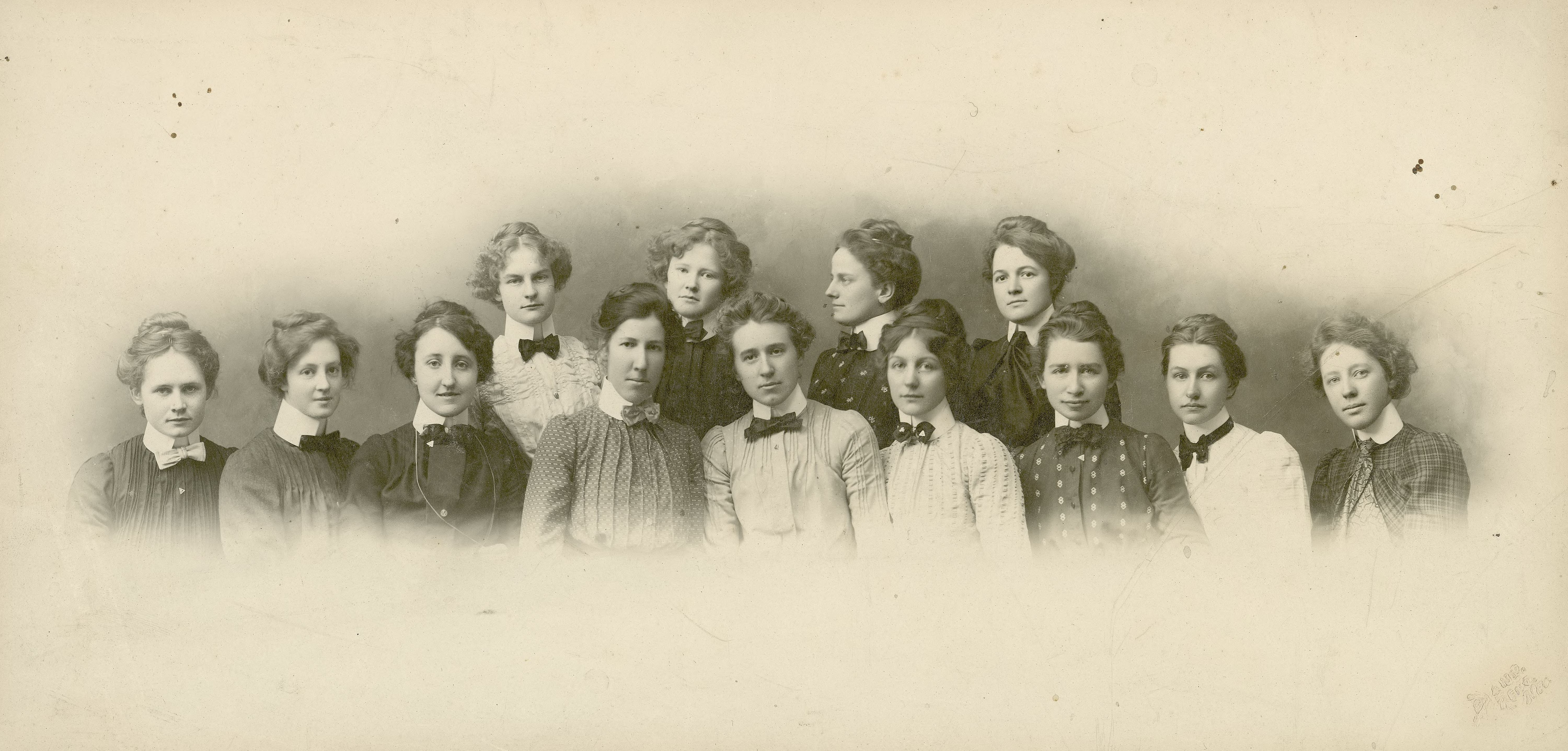
Delta Rho sorority at Nevada State University, 1901

Sororities, originally called women's fraternities, began to develop in 1851 with the formation of the Adelphean Society Alpha Delta Pi. However, fraternity-like organizations for women did not take their current form until the establishment of Pi Beta Phi in 1867 and Kappa Alpha Theta and Kappa Kappa Gamma in 1870. The term sorority was used by a professor of Latin at Syracuse University, Frank Smalley, who felt the word "fraternity" was inappropriate for a group of ladies. The word comes from Latin soror, meaning "sister," "cousin, daughter of a father's brother", or "female friend". The first organization to use the term "sorority" was Gamma Phi Beta, established in 1874.

The development of women's fraternities during this time was a major accomplishment in women's rights and equality. By their mere existence, these organizations defied the odds; the founding women advanced their organizations despite many factors working against them. The first women's fraternities not only had to overcome "restrictive social customs, unequal status under the law and the underlying presumption that they were less able than men", but at the same time had to deal with the same challenges as fraternities with college administrations.

Today, both social and multicultural sororities are present on more than 650 college campuses across the United States and Canada. The National Panhellenic Conference (NPC) serves as the umbrella organization for 26 international sororities. Founded in 1902, NPC is one of the oldest and largest women's membership organizations, representing more than four million women at 655 college and university campuses and 4,500 local alumni chapters in the U.S. and Canada.

=== Internationalization ===
==== United Kingdom ====
Student literary societies were established in the late 18th and early 19th century in the UK but, unlike in the US, did not evolve into fraternities but into university debating unions. Three of these – the Cambridge Union (1815, from the union of three earlier societies), the Oxford Union (1823, as the United Debating Society) and the Durham Union (1835, as the Durham University Debating Society with university support; 1842, as the independent Durham University Union) – continue to exist as independent societies with their own club houses, while others, such as the University of St Andrews Union Debating Society (1794, as the Literary Society) and the UCL Debating Society (1829, as the Literary and Philosophical Society), were absorbed by the students' unions at their universities. The last society formed along these lines was Durham, with later debating societies being purely focused on debating rather than also being social clubs.

In 1867, the Chi Phi fraternity established its Theta chapter at the University of Edinburgh in Scotland, marking the first foray of the American social fraternity outside the borders of the United States. At the time, many students from the American South were moving to Europe to study because of the disrepair southern universities fell into during the American Civil War. One such group of Americans organized Chi Phi at Edinburgh; however, during the Theta chapter's existence, it initiated no non-American members. With declining American enrollment at European universities, Chi Phi at Edinburgh closed in 1870.

In 2001, Alpha Kappa Psi established a chapter at the University of Manchester in England. This was followed by Zeta Psi at the University of Oxford in 2008 and at the University of St Andrews in 2011 (inactive from 2014). Zeta Beta Tau established city-based chapters in Nottingham and Birmingham in 2011; as of 2026, neither is listed on the Zeta Beta Tau chapter locator. Alpha Epsilon Pi also established a chapter at the University of St. Andrews in Scotland and city chapters in Birmingham and Leeds, England; as of 2026, these and six other Alpha Epsilon Pi chapters established at various times in the UK are all listed as inactive on their chapter roll. Alpha Kappa Psi added a second UK chapter, at Queen Mary, University of London, in 2017. In 2026, Theta Tau established a chapter at the University of Manchester.

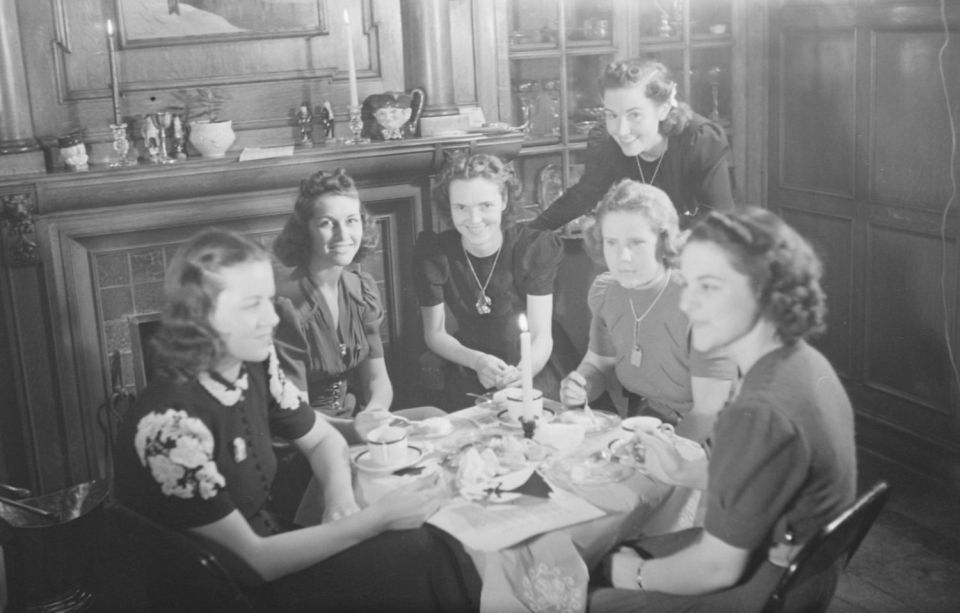
Rush party at Gamma Phi Beta sorority at McGill University in Montreal, 1939

==== Canada ====
In 1879, Zeta Psi established a chapter at the University of Toronto. Zeta Psi's success in Toronto prompted it to open a second Canadian chapter at McGill University, which it chartered in 1883. Other early foundations were Kappa Alpha Society at Toronto in 1892 and at McGill in 1899, and Alpha Delta Phi at Toronto in 1893 and at McGill in 1897.

The first sorority outside the United States, Kappa Alpha Theta, was established in Toronto in 1887. By 1927, there were 42 fraternity and sorority chapters at the University of Toronto and 23 at McGill University. A few chapters were also reported at the University of British Columbia, Carleton University, Dalhousie University, University of Manitoba, Queen's University, University of Western Ontario, Wilfrid Laurier University, University of Waterloo and Brock University.

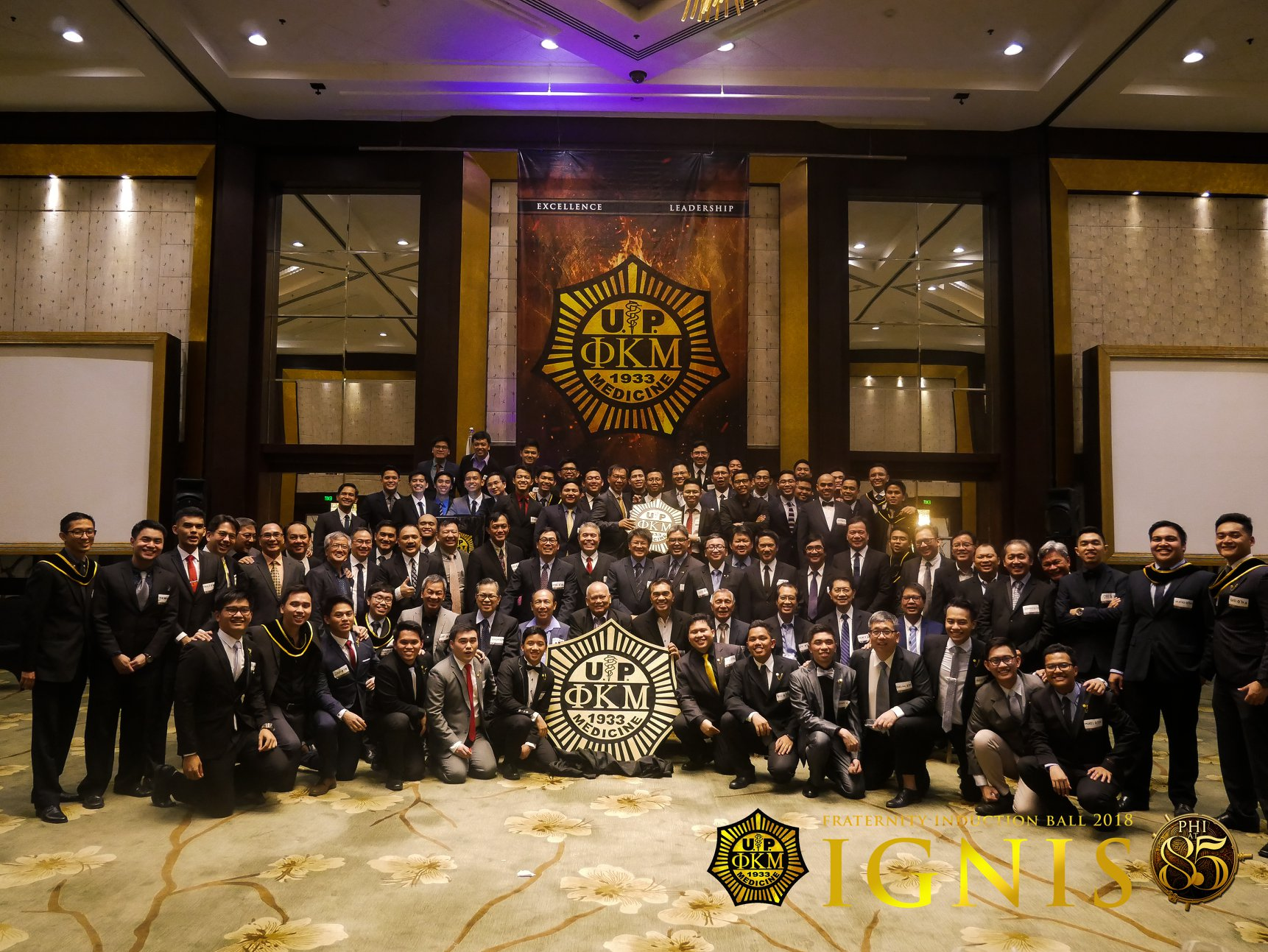
Phi Kappa Mu celebrates its 85th anniversary at the University of the Philippines

==== Philippines ====
The arrival of the fraternity system in Asia accompanied the introduction of the American educational system in the Philippines. The first fraternities were established in the University of the Philippines. The now-defunct Patriotic and Progressive Rizal Center Academic Brotherhood (Rizal Center Fraternity), a brotherhood of Jose Rizal followers, was founded in 1913. This was followed by the Rizal Center Sorority. The first Greek-letter organization and fraternity in Asia, the Upsilon Sigma Phi, was founded in 1918. The first Greek-letter sorority, UP Sigma Beta Sorority, was recognized in 1932. As of 2026, Tau Gamma Phi, Alpha Kappa Rho and Alpha Phi Omega have a combined 200+ chapters in the Philippines.

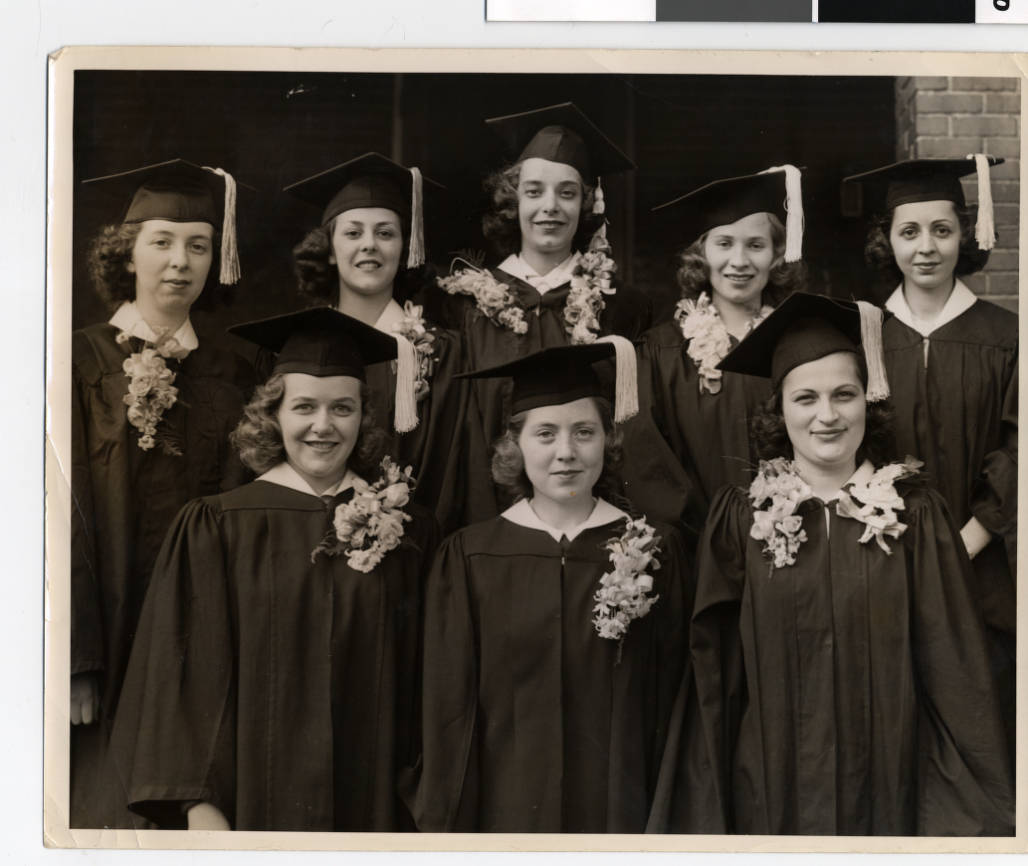
Sisters of the Sigma Delta Tau at the University of Minnesota, 1940. The sorority was founded by seven women at Cornell University who were denied membership in other sororities because they were Jewish.

=== Religion ===
Many early fraternities referred to Christian principles or to a Supreme Being in general, as is characteristic of fraternal orders. Some, such as Alpha Chi Rho (1895) and Alpha Kappa Lambda (1907), only admitted Christians, while others, such as Beta Sigma Psi (1925) and Phi Kappa Theta (1959), catered to students belonging with certain denominations of Christianity, such as Lutheranism and Catholicism.

Due to their exclusion from Christian fraternities in the United States, Jewish students began to establish their own fraternities in 1895 and 1920, with the first one being Zeta Beta Tau, founded in 1898.

Although many of the religion-specific requirements for many fraternities and sororities have been relaxed or removed, there are some today that continue to rally around their faith as a focal point, such as Beta Upsilon Chi (1985) and Sigma Alpha Omega (1998).

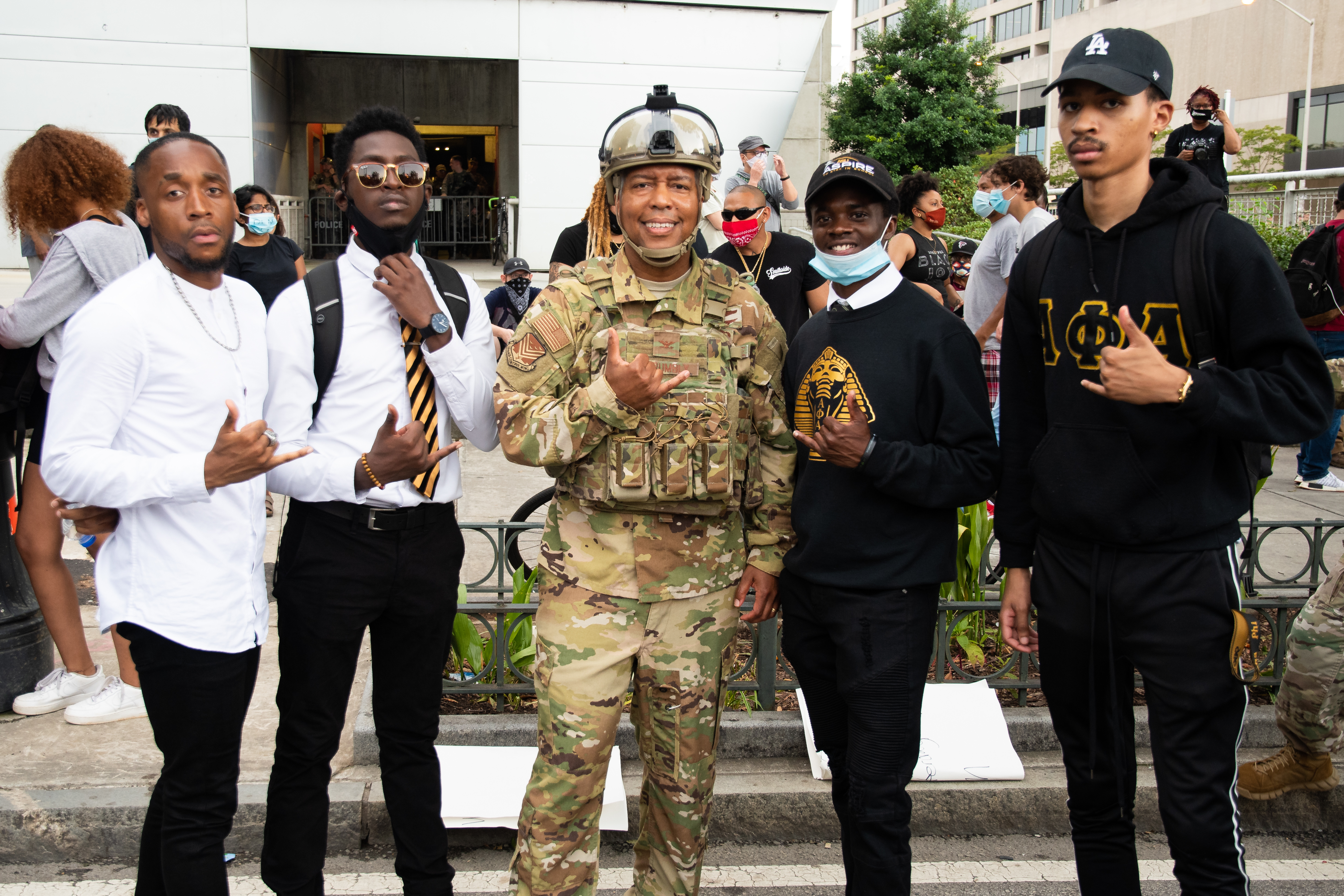
Alpha Phi Alpha fraternity members assist the Georgia Air National Guard during a George Floyd protest in Atlanta in June 2020

=== Multiculturalism ===
Numerous Greek organizations in the past have enacted formal and informal prohibitions on pledging individuals of different races and cultural backgrounds. This began with historically White fraternities and sororities excluding African Americans. Historically Black fraternities and sororities were spearheaded thereafter in response.

Racist policies have since been abolished by the North American Interfraternity Conference, and students of various ethnicities have come together to form a council of multicultural Greek organizations. The National Multicultural Greek Council, officially formed in 1998, is a coordinating body of 19 Greek organizations, including nine fraternities and ten sororities with cultural affiliations.

The first multicultural sorority, Mu Sigma Upsilon, was established in November 1981 at Rutgers University in New Brunswick, New Jersey. The formation of this Greek organization allowed for the emergence of a multicultural fraternity and sorority movement, giving birth to a multicultural movement.

=== Professional fraternities and sororities ===
The main purpose of professional fraternities and sororities is to promote the interests of a particular profession, and their membership is generally restricted to students and alumni in particular academic disciplines or industries.

=== Service fraternities and sororities ===
The term service fraternities and sororities is used to describe Greek life organizations whose primary purpose is to facilitate and accomplish acts of community service; this is in contrast to certain social fraternities and sororities or religious fraternities and sororities that participate in philanthropy and community service as a non-primary (secondary or tertiary) mission.

== Structure and organization ==
=== Gender exclusivity ===
Fraternities and sororities traditionally have been single-sex organizations, with fraternities consisting exclusively of men and sororities consisting exclusively of women. In the United States, fraternities and sororities have a statutory exemption from Title IX legislation prohibiting this type of gender exclusion within student groups, and organizations such as the Fraternity and Sorority Political Action Committee lobby to maintain it.

Since the mid-20th century, a small number of fraternities, such as Alpha Theta and Lambda Lambda Lambda, have opted to become co-educational and admit female members; however, these generally represent a minority of Greek-letter organizations and no such fraternity is currently a member of the North American Interfraternity Conference, the largest international association of fraternities. The first coed fraternity was Pi Alpha Tau (1963–1991) at the University of Illinois at Chicago.

Much more commonly, coed fraternities exist in the form of service fraternities, such as Alpha Phi Omega and Epsilon Sigma Alpha and others. These organizations are similar to social fraternities and sororities, except they are coed and non-residential. Similarly, in the United States, professional fraternities, such as Alpha Kappa Psi, Delta Sigma Pi, and Phi Gamma Nu, are required to be co-ed under the Title IX amendments, as are any fraternities that are not social.

In 2014, Sigma Phi Epsilon became the first fraternity in the North American Interfraternity Conference to accept transgender members, or those identifying as male, to join the social fraternity. Several sororities have adjusted their policies to confirm that transgender prospective members are allowed.

Importantly, all these variants have stemmed from a process of self-determination, without challenge by other fraternities and sororities. In a bellwether case in 2016, Harvard University changed its student conduct code to bar members of single-sex groups from leading campus groups, serving as captains of sports teams, or participating in valuable academic fellowships. After several affected fraternities and sororities challenged the rule in court, Harvard rescinded the rule in 2020.

=== Governance ===
Individual chapters of fraternities and sororities are largely self-governed by their active (student) members; however, alumni members may retain legal ownership of the fraternity or sorority's property through an alumni chapter or alumni corporation. All of a single fraternity or sorority's chapters are generally grouped in a national or international organization that sets standards, regulates insignia and ritual, publishes a journal or magazine for all of the chapters of the organization, and has the power to grant and revoke charters to chapters. These federal structures are largely governed by alumni members of the fraternity, though with some input from the active (student) members.

=== Leadership ===
The leadership structure of a typical college fraternity chapter is designed as a hierarchical "executive board" that mirrors corporate or civic governance to ensure the chapter's operational stability. At the top is the president, who serves as the primary liaison between the chapter, the university administration, and the national headquarters. Supporting the president are several key officers: the vice president, who often oversees internal committee operations; the Treasurer, responsible for managing the chapter's budget and dues collection; and the secretary, who handles records and communications. Specialized roles such as the recruitment chair (responsible for growth), the risk manager (ensuring safety and policy compliance), the serjeant-at-arms (counting votes and ensuring attendance), and the scholarship chair (monitoring academic performance) are also standard. These positions are usually elected annually by the general membership.

=== Rushing and pledging ===
Before 1900, the expansion of fraternal housing and competition among fraternities led to increasingly aggressive recruitment among the social fraternities, which had hitherto followed the methodical process of tapping and individualized invitations that are still present among honorary and professional fraternities. In an introductory article about the nature and history of fraternal life, Baird's Manual of American College Fraternities indicates that the term "Rushing" and later, "Rush week" hearken to the effort to rush to meet incoming trains filled with new classmates and delegations of freshmen students, where bids were offered and lapel pins then "spiked" the new fellow to mark him as a new member of the fraternity which he opted to join. Baird's Manual further indicates that the tradition was adopted from English boarding schools, similarly jostling to recruit incoming prospects, which the aggressive fraternities found to be "handy to imitate". Variations of Rush Week continued to evolve, some offering immediate recruitment and some deferred until the second half of freshman year, or even into the second year. Formal recruitment on all, or virtually all, campuses continues as a defined Rush week, while many campuses and most chapters offer ongoing "informal rush" to welcome potential members, amounting to hundreds of thousands of new members every year.

Today, most fraternities and sororities select potential members through a two-part process of vetting and probation, called rushing and pledging, respectively. During rush (recruitment), students attend designated social events, and sometimes formal interviews, hosted by the chapters of fraternities and sororities in which they have particular interests. Usually, after a potential new member has attended several such events, officers or current members meet privately to vote on whether or not to extend an invitation, known as a "bid", to the prospective applicant.

Those applicants who receive a bid and choose to accept it are considered to have "pledged" the fraternity or sorority, thus beginning the pledge period (new member period). Students participating in rush are known as "rushees", Potential New Members "PNMs", while students who have accepted a bid to a specific fraternity or sorority are known as "new members" or in some cases "pledges".

A new member period may last anywhere from one weekend to several months. During this time, new members might participate in almost all aspects of the life of the fraternity or sorority, but most likely not be permitted to hold office in the organization. After the new member period, a second vote of members may sometimes be taken, often, but not always, using a blackball system. New members who pass this second vote are invited to a formal and secret ritual of initiation into the organization, advancing them to full membership.

Many Greek-letter organizations give preferential consideration for pledging to candidates whose parent or sibling was a member of the same fraternity or sorority. Such prospective candidates are known as "legacies".

Membership in more than one fraternity or sorority is acceptable, but only under specific Greek councils. Recently, some Greek-letter organizations have replaced the term "pledge" with that of "associate member" or "new member". Sigma Alpha Epsilon, in 2014, abolished pledging altogether. Potential members are now immediately initiated into the fraternity upon accepting a bid.

=== Bonds ===
Greek letter organizations rely heavily on the relationships among their members, both active and alumni. Through practices that bring the chapter together as a whole, fraternities and sororities emphasize the bond that is created through their shared Greek affiliation. These bonds are created through educational, social, and ritualistic bonds that build the relationships. Educational practices of these bonding practices can consist of the academic demands of membership in Greek Letter organizations. With pressure from higher education in itself and academic standards, such as a minimal grade point average requirement, members have the support of their fellow members, who are also under similar pressures of success to bond and create relationships with. Members also can create mutual relationships over their coursework or availability to study aids within the chapter.

=== Residency ===
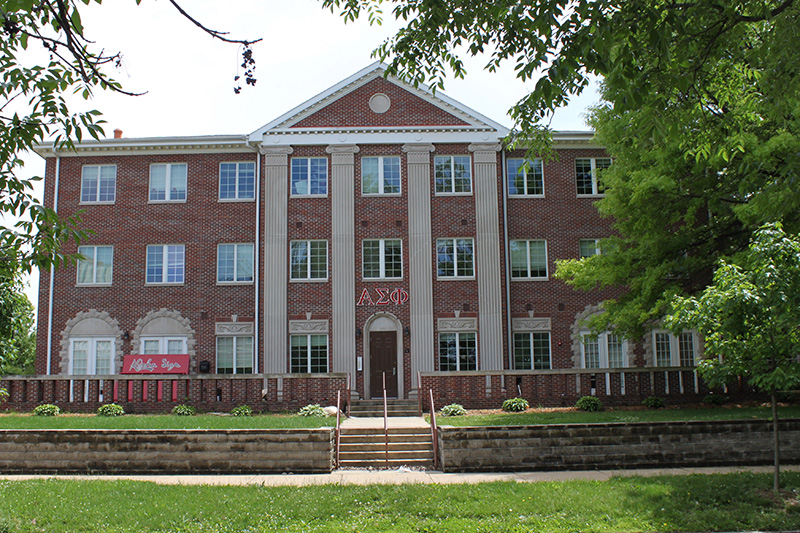
Alpha Sigma Phi chapter house at the University of Illinois Urbana-Champaign

Unique among most campus organizations, members of social fraternities and sororities usually congregate and sometimes live together in large houses, generally privately owned by the organization or by the organization's alumni association. Often, fraternities and sorority houses, called lodges or chapter houses, are located on the same street or in close quarters within the same neighborhood, which may be colloquially known as "Greek row", "frat row", or "sorority row". Often, chapter houses are uniquely designed, highly elaborate, and very expensive to operate and maintain.

Chapter houses became more common in the late 19th century, when organizations began to grow in size, and wealthy alumni were able to help purchase or build houses. The first purpose-built residential chapter house is believed to have been Alpha Delta Phi's chapter at Cornell University, with groundbreaking dated to 1878. Alpha Tau Omega became the first fraternity to own a residential house in the South when, in 1880, its chapter at the University of the South acquired one. Chapters of many fraternities followed suit, purchasing and, less often, building them with the support of alumni. Phi Sigma Kappa's chapter home at Cornell, completed in 1902, is the oldest such house still occupied by its fraternal builders.

Usually, the more expensive the house, the higher the annual organization dues. The features and size of chapter houses play a major role in chapters remaining competitive in recruiting and retaining members on many campuses. At some, often small colleges, fraternities and sororities occupy a specific section of university-owned housing provided to them. Some fraternities and sororities are unhoused, with members providing their own accommodations. In many of these cases, the fraternity or sorority owns or rents a non-residential clubhouse on or off campus to use for meetings and other activities.

=== Secrecy and ritual ===
Most fraternities and sororities are secret societies. While the identity of members or officers is rarely concealed, fraternities and sororities initiate members following the pledge period through sometimes elaborate private rituals, frequently drawn or adopted from Masonic ritual practice or that of the Greek mysteries.

After an initiation ritual, the organization's secret motto, secret purpose, and secret identification signs, such as handshakes and passwords, are usually revealed to its new members. Some fraternities also teach initiates an identity search device used to confirm fellow fraternity members.

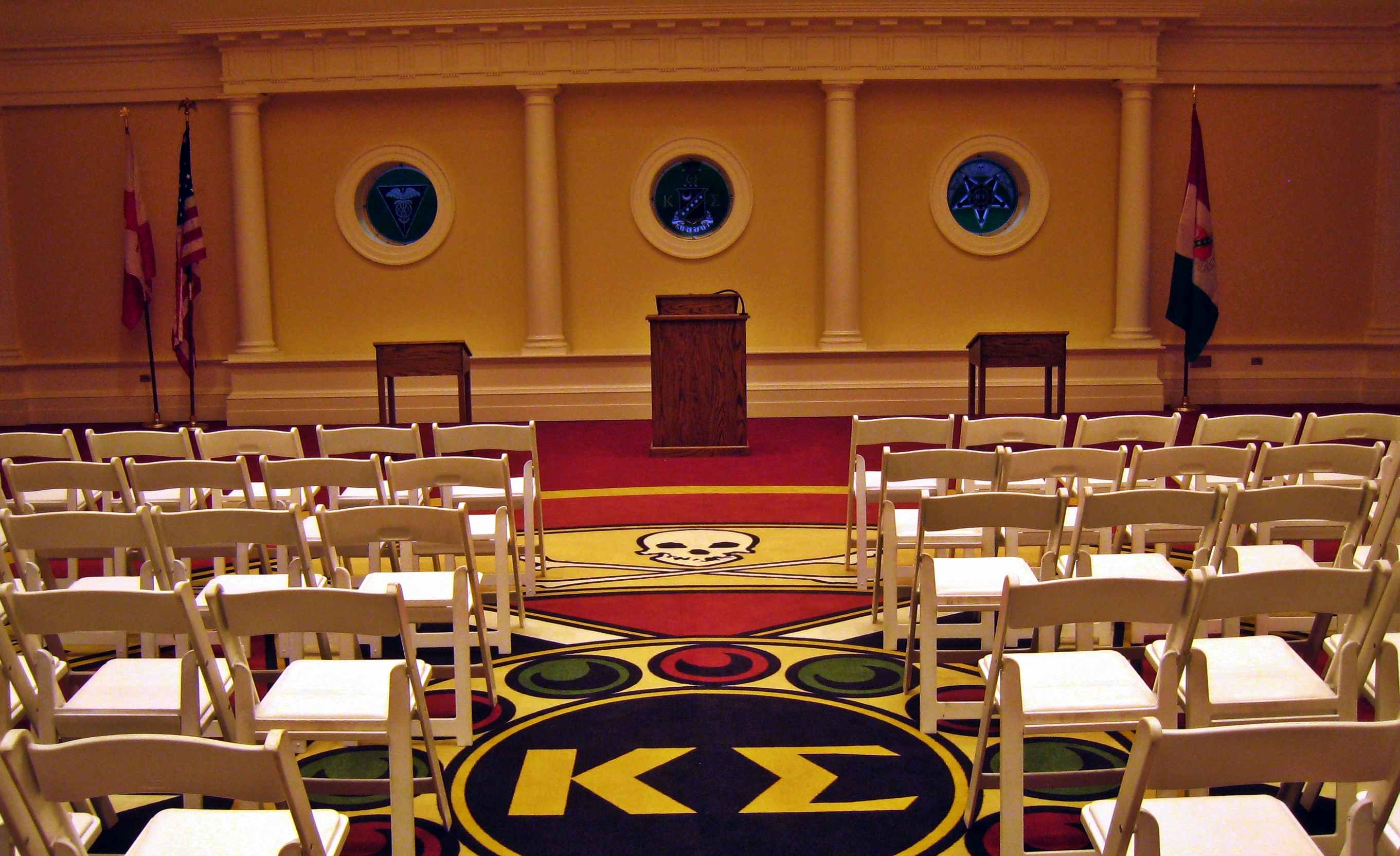
A model chapter room of Kappa Sigma

Julian Hawthorne, the son of Nathaniel Hawthorne, wrote in his posthumously published Memoirs of his initiation into Delta Kappa Epsilon:

I was initiated into a college secret society—a couple of hours of grotesque and good-humored rodomontade and horseplay, in which I cooperated as in a kind of pleasant nightmare, confident, even when branded with a red-hot iron or doused head-over-heels in boiling oil, that it would come out all right. The neophyte is effectively blindfolded during the proceedings, and at last, still sightless, I was led down flights of steps into a silent crypt and helped into a coffin, where I was to stay until the Resurrection ... Thus it was that just as my father passed from this earth, I was lying in a coffin during my initiation into Delta Kappa Epsilon.

Meetings and rituals are sometimes conducted in what is known as a chapter room located inside the fraternity's house. Entry into chapter rooms is often prohibited to all but the initiated. In one extreme case, the response of firefighters to a blaze signaled by an automated alarm at the Sigma Phi chapter house at the University of Wisconsin in 2003 was hampered in part because fraternity members refused to disclose to emergency responders the location of the hidden chapter room, where the conflagration had erupted.

=== Symbols and naming conventions ===
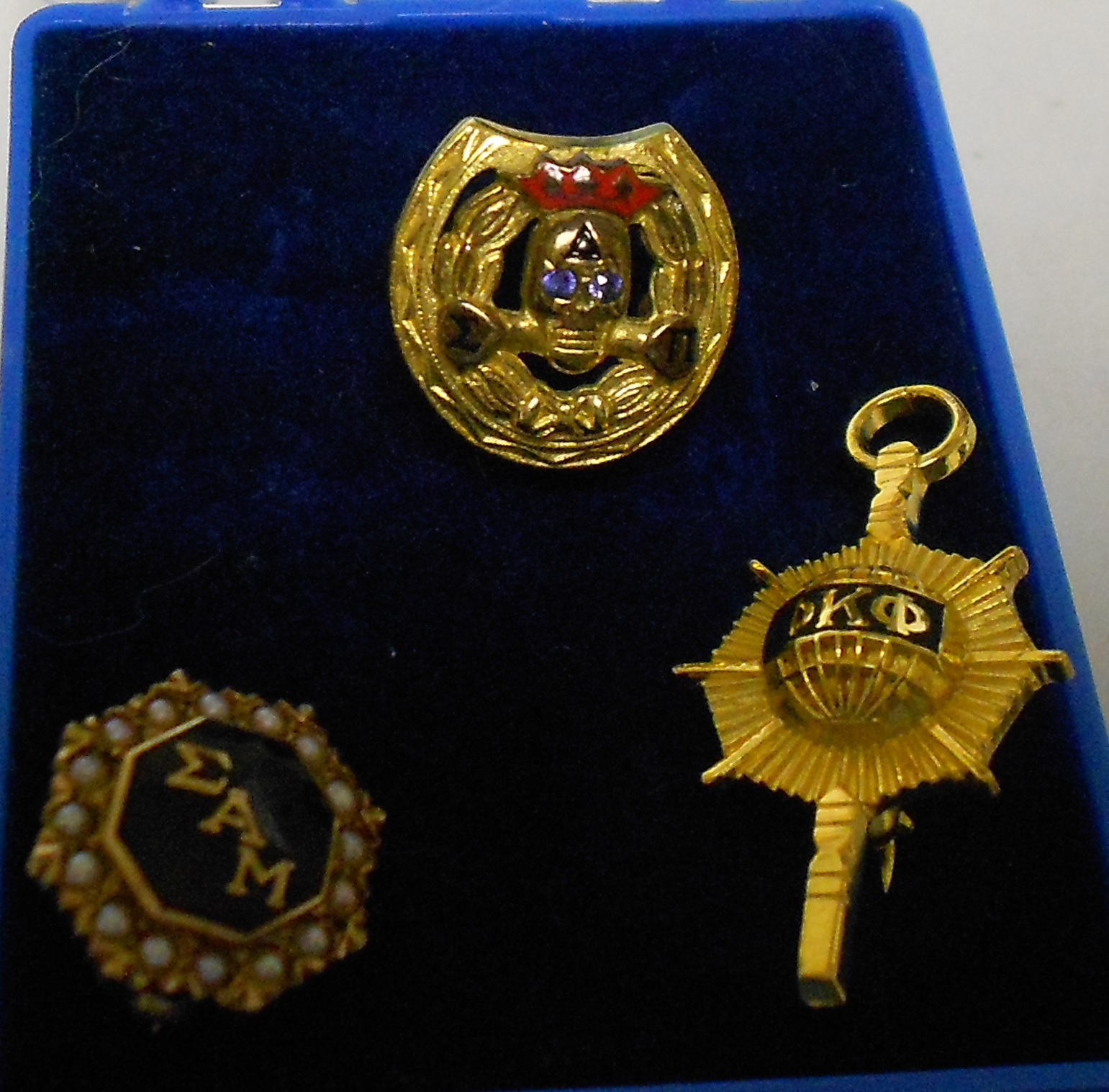
Badges of Sigma Alpha Mu (left), Delta Sigma Pi (center), and Phi Kappa Phi (right)

Dating back to their origins in the 19th century, fraternities and sororities adopted symbolism from the ancient Greeks and Romans, chivalric traditions, and Jewish and Christian scripture learned in their classes, along with some influences of Freemasonry. The names of almost all fraternities and sororities consist of a sequence of two or three Greek letters, for instance, Delta Delta Delta, Sigma Chi, Chi Omega, or Psi Upsilon. There are a few exceptions to this general rule, as in the case of the fraternities Triangle and Acacia. In many cases, the Greek letters that are selected stand for Greek words or the organization's motto.

Most fraternities and sororities adopted the chivalric tradition of heraldry, including a crest, coat of arms, colors, and motto. They may also have official flags, symbols, flowers, jewels, mascots, patron saints, or a Greek divinity. Many European fraternities also have zirkels, an identifying monogram.

The fraternity or sorority badge is an enduring symbol of membership in a Greek letter organization, and often incorporates the organization's Greek letters and various symbols.

== Membership profile ==
=== Demographics ===
As of 2011, there were approximately nine million student and alumni members of fraternities and sororities in North America, or about three percent of the total population. Roughly 750,000 undergraduate students belong to 12,000 fraternity and sorority chapters on 800 campuses in Canada and the United States.

A 2007 survey conducted by Princeton University found that White and higher-income Princeton students are much more likely than other Princeton students to be in fraternities and sororities. Senior surveys from the classes of 2009 and 2010 showed that 77 percent of sorority members and 73 percent of fraternity members were White.

=== Notable fraternity and sorority members ===
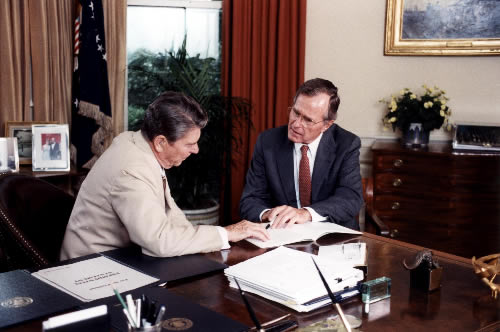
Ronald Reagan was initiated into Tau Kappa Epsilon at Eureka College in Eureka, Illinois and his successor, George H. W. Bush, was a member of Delta Kappa Epsilon at Yale University.

Since 1900, 63 percent of members of the United States cabinet have been members of fraternities and sororities, and the current chief executive officers of five of the ten largest Fortune 500 companies are members of fraternities and sororities. In addition, 85 percent of all justices of the U.S. Supreme Court since 1910 have been members of fraternities. U.S. presidents since World War II who have been initiated into fraternities are George W. Bush, George H. W. Bush, Bill Clinton, Ronald Reagan, Harry S. Truman, Gerald Ford, and Franklin Roosevelt. Three Prime Ministers of Canada have been members of fraternities.

In 2013, about 25 percent of members of the U.S. House of Representatives and 40 percent of members of the U.S. Senate were members of fraternities or sororities.

=== Academic performance ===
Studies have found that university graduation rates are 20 percent higher among members of Greek-letter organizations than among non-members, and students who are members of fraternities and sororities typically have higher-than-average grade point averages. One reason for this may be that many chapters and colleges require members to maintain a certain academic standard.

Each organization requires its members to maintain a minimum GPA to continue their membership. Fraternity and sorority members who maintain high GPAs may be invited to join notable Greek honor societies, such as Gamma Sigma Alpha and Order of Omega. Gamma Sigma Alpha acknowledges fraternity and sorority members who hold a 3.5 GPA in upper-division classes. Order of Omega recognizes the top three percent of fraternity and sorority members who exemplify leadership qualities. Greek honor societies provide lifetime membership with opportunities such as scholarships and networking.

=== Professional advancement ===
Many fraternities and sororities provide "finishing" training for new members, such as instruction on etiquette, dress, and manners, and create networking opportunities for their newly graduated members. There is a high representation of former fraternity and sorority members among certain elites in the United States. Fraternity and sorority members "are more likely to be thriving in their well-being and engaged at work than college graduates who did not go Greek," according to a study done by Gallup and Purdue University. Not only that, but researchers at Union College studied the effects of fraternity and sorority membership on the incomes of those who participated when attending university versus those who did not, finding that those that had participated had incomes higher than their non-Greek peers by as much as 36%.

=== Monetary commitments ===
Greek organizations require a monetary commitment for membership, with the requirement to pay dues. While varying across locales, they generally include chapter fees, national dues, and sometimes social or facility charges. Outside of the member payments, other costs exist. Social events, including appropriate clothes, nightlife, Greek "family" gifts, and letter apparel, are optional, but are additional costs. While they are not mandatory, they are seen as part of the Greek culture, and can then cause pressure for members who can not afford all of the extra expenses. These financial burdens can deter lower-income college students from joining a chapter. However, membership does not require a certain income or social class to join, allowing its lower-income members to still be involved despite monetary obligations. One study found that 82% of the working-class students worked part-time jobs while 36% were still involved in Greek life.

=== Personal fulfillment ===
Fraternities and sororities engage in philanthropic activities and host social events. A 2014 Gallup survey of 30,000 university alumni found that persons who said they had been members of Greek-letter organizations while undergraduates reported having a greater sense of purpose, as well as better social and physical well-being, than those who had not.

== Criticism ==
Fraternities and sororities have been criticized for practicing elitism and favoritism, discriminating against non-White students and other marginalized groups, conducting dangerous hazing rituals, and facilitating alcohol abuse and campus sexual assault including rape culture. Many colleges and universities have sought to reform or eliminate them due to these concerns, but these efforts have typically been met with intense controversy.

=== Homogeneous membership and elitism ===
Fraternities and sororities have often been characterized as elitist or exclusionary associations, organized for the benefit of a largely White, upper-class membership base. Members of fraternities and sororities disproportionately come from certain socio-economic demographics. Fraternities specifically have been criticized for what is perceived as their promotion of an excessively alcohol-fueled, party-focused lifestyle.

New York Times columnist Frank Bruni questioned the existence of exclusive clubs on campuses that are meant to facilitate independence, writing, "Colleges should be cultivating the kind of sensibility that makes you a better citizen of a diverse and distressingly fractious society. How is that served by retreating into an exclusionary clique of people just like you?"

Some colleges and universities have banned Greek letter organizations. The oldest ban was at Princeton University, though Princeton has now had fraternities since the 1980s. Oberlin College banned "secret societies" (fraternities and sororities) in 1847, and the prohibition continues to the present. Quaker universities, such as Guilford College and Earlham College, often ban fraternities and sororities because they are seen as a violation of the Quaker principle of equality. Brandeis University has never permitted fraternities or sororities as it maintains a policy that all student organizations have membership open to all. Hamilton College did not prohibit fraternities, but to improve campus social conditions, in 1995 mandated that all students would be required to live and eat on campus; the college also bought the fraternity houses.

=== Alcohol use ===
One Harvard University study found that :"4 out of 5 fraternity and sorority members are binge drinkers. In comparison, other research suggests 2 out of 5 college students overall are regular binge drinkers." There is also a higher rate of alcohol-related deaths and injuries among fraternities, which has resulted in many lawsuits and suspensions.

=== Drug use ===
Studies have shown that fraternity and sorority members are more likely than the average college student to use or abuse drugs. Since the 1990s, fraternity members have experienced an increase of over 400 percent in the recreational use of prescription benzodiazepines like Xanax and Valium. Amphetamine use, including drugs like Ritalin and Adderall, is more common among fraternity members than other college students. Fraternity members also abuse amphetamines at double the rate of their non-college peers. Marijuana use is also more prevalent among fraternity and sorority members compared to college men and women not in fraternities or sororities.

=== Hazing ===
An illustration depicting fraternity hazing from the early 20th century

Fraternities, and to a lesser extent, sororities, have been criticized for hazing, sometimes committed by active undergraduate members against their chapter's pledges. Common hazing practices include sleep deprivation, sensory deprivation, paddling, use of stress positions, forced runs, busy work, forced smoking, forced drinking, forced drug use, forced consumption of spoiled food, public humiliation, and mind games. Rarer incidents have involved branding, enemas, urination and feces on pledges, puking, and public masturbation. Historically, hazing of pledges culminated in an event known as "Hell Week," in which a week-long series of physical and mental torments is inflicted on pledges. In its worst form, hazing has led to the injury or death of fraternity and sorority pledges or members.

In the 21st century, most fraternities and sororities prohibit hazing, as do colleges and universities. In addition, there are anti-hazing laws in most states, criminalizing hazing in the United States. As a result, reports of hazing have led to the permanent expulsion of particular chapters of fraternities and sororities by both universities and the national fraternity or sorority and, in some cases, criminal charges. At some colleges, Hell Week has evolved into Help Week, a time for community service. Despite this, hazing deaths continue to be reported.

In 2007, the National Anti-Hazing Hotline was set up to report incidents of hazing on college and university campuses. Currently, 47 national fraternity and sorority organizations support the toll-free number and reporting service of the National Anti-Hazing Hotline. Annually, the last week of September is considered to be National Hazing Prevention Week.

=== Nepotism and networking ===
Critics of Greek-letter organizations assert that they create a culture of nepotism in later life, while supporters have applauded them for creating networking opportunities for members after graduation. A 2013 report by Bloomberg found that fraternity connections are influential in obtaining lucrative employment positions at top Wall Street brokerages. According to the report, recent graduates have been known to exchange the secret handshakes of their fraternities with executives whom they know are also members to obtain access to competitive appointments.

=== Sexism and sexual violence ===
Studies show that fraternity men are three times more likely to commit rape than other men on college campuses. Fraternity pledges are at a higher likelihood to commit rape or sexual assault because of the pressure to meet the hyper-masculine standards that fraternities expect of their members. Overall, fraternity men are shown to have more rape-supportive attitudes than non-fraternity men.

Fraternities have often been accused of fostering rape-supportive attitudes by promoting male dominance and brotherhood, and fraternity affiliation is a significant predictor of sexually predatory behavior in retrospective research.

Attitudes towards women learned in fraternity life can perpetuate fraternity men's lifelong attitudes, leading to the potential to commit sexual assault and rape after college. Studies show that women in sororities are almost twice as likely to experience rape than other college women. A 2017 research article studied campus demographics and reported rapes, and found that campuses that report more rapes have more fraternity men, athletes and liquor violations.

Researchers have found that in predominantly male environments, such as fraternities, athletics, and military groups, men feel pressure to meet the group's standard of masculinity, which may contribute to men being more accepting of sexual violence. Nicholas Syrett, a professor of history at the University of Northern Colorado, has been a vocal critic of the evolution of fraternities in the 20th century. In 2011, Syrett stated that "fraternal masculinity has, for at least 80 years, valorized athletics, alcohol abuse, and sex with women."

Time magazine columnist Jessica Bennett has denounced fraternities as breeding "sexism and misogyny that lasts long after college". In her column, Bennett recounts that, while she was an undergraduate student at the University of Southern California, doormen at fraternity parties "often ranked women on a scale of 1 to 10, with only 'sixes' and up granted entry to a party".

Fraternity and sorority members face a higher risk of STDs compared to their non-Greek college peers, largely due to their higher rates of socializing, substance abuse (impaired judgement), sexual violence, and more casual sex partners.

To protect their fraternity's brotherhood, fraternity men and athletes may not confront or report sexual assault when it happens. Perpetrators often receive little to no consequences for their actions.

=== Test and homework banks ===
Some claim that the higher-than-average test scores of fraternity and sorority members are partially due to test and homework banks filled over the years by members of their organization. This practice has been condemned as academic dishonesty.

=== Alleged racism and minority discrimination ===
Researchers, such as Matthew W. Hughey, claim to have linked racism in Greek life to people experiencing microaggressions, fewer opportunities to use the networking system built into Greek life, and the use of stereotypes. In response to allegedly experiencing racism and exclusion from solely or predominantly White sororities, Black and multicultural organizations were founded. Additionally, homophobia, transphobia, antisemitism, and xenophobia are alleged issues with many college Greek systems across the US.

== Fraternity and sorority vocabulary ==
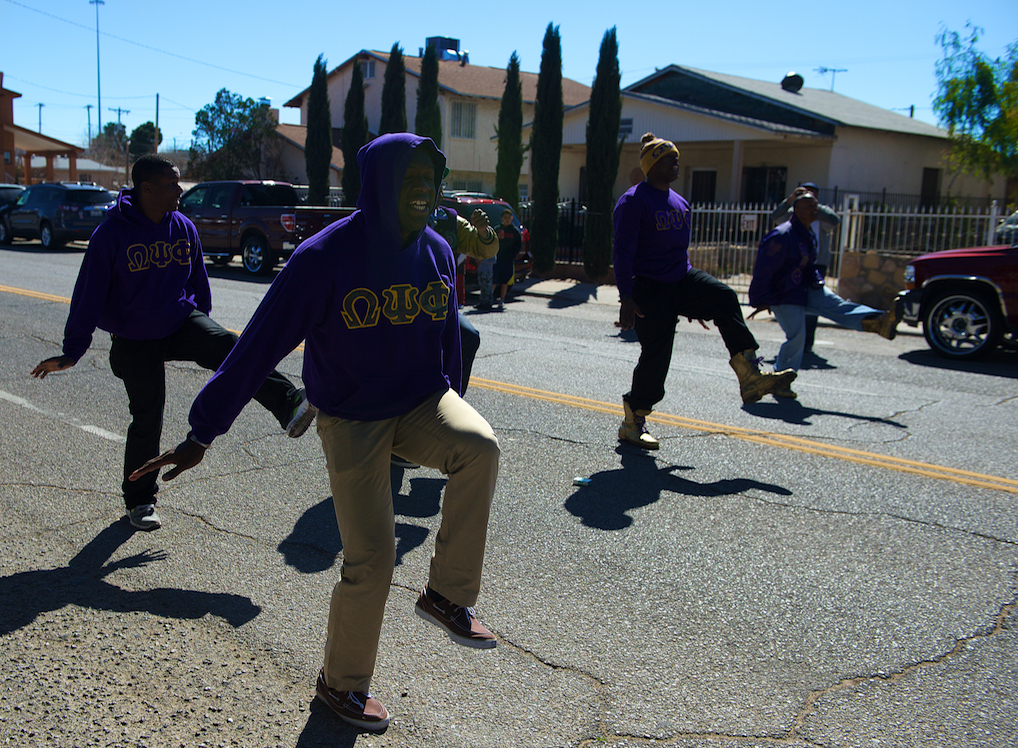
Omega Psi Phi members perform a step routine during the 2015 Black History Month Parade in El Paso, Texas.

- Active – an initiated, undergraduate student member of a fraternity or sorority
- Alumni, alumna, alumnus – a member of a sorority or fraternity who has graduated or is no longer an undergraduate student. They are often organized as an alumni association that owns and manages the fraternity's or sorority's chapter house.
- Auxiliary group (also "sweetheart" or "little brother/sister" group) – an unofficial, unsanctioned partner organization to a fraternity or sorority, usually for members of the opposite sex. The two largest Greek umbrella organizations for social fraternities and sororities, the North American Interfraternity Conference and the National Panhellenic Conference, ban the formation of or discourage membership in auxiliary groups. Some fraternities and sororities outside of these conferences also ban auxiliaries, including Phi Mu Alpha Sinfonia and Sigma Alpha Iota. Part of the rationale behind banning auxiliary groups is that such groups could jeopardize the host organizations' Title IX exemptions, citing the United States Supreme Court's ruling in Roberts v. United States Jaycees.
- Badge – a pin worn by an initiated member of a fraternity or sorority. In the 19th and early 20th century, badges were also worn as a watch fob. See also pledge pin.
- Bid – a formal offer to become a pledge (see below) of a fraternity or sorority.
- Blacklist – an official or unofficial list of people not allowed inside the house or to any events of the fraternity or sorority.
- Blackballed – in this context,a used as a definition of expelling from a community or group. This means that a person may not be accepted by any fraternity or sorority because of the negative reputation they gained at a particular group. This is usually an informal discussion made by the presidents or rush chairs of the fraternities or sororities.
- Brother – term used by members of fraternities when referring to each other or an active member of a fraternity
- Call – a vocal expression used by members of a fraternity or sorority
- Chapter – a local branch or unit of a fraternity or sorority
- Chapter room – a room inside a fraternity house, often secret or hidden, where meetings occur and where rituals are performed.
- Charter – an official document establishing the creation of a chapter of a fraternity or sorority
- Class – term used for members of a fraternity or sorority who join in the same semester or initiation period; see also Line
- Coat of arms, crest – insignia used by fraternities and sororities, often including secret meanings
- Colony – a newly established chapter of a national/international fraternity or sorority in the process of organization.
- Crossover – an initiation ceremony for some fraternities and sororities
- Fracket – a disposable coat worn to a fraternity party, coined from the words "fraternity" and "jacket".
- Frat boy – a member of a fraternity characterized by a way of dressing and a homogeneous behavior as other members of that fraternity.
- Geed, GDI ("God Damn Independent") – someone who is not a member of a fraternity or sorority.
- Greek – a fraternity or sorority member
- Initiation – ritual or ceremony where a pledge transitions to a full member of a fraternity or sorority
- International – a fraternity or sorority with two or more chapters, located in different nations
- Legacy – a rushee who is related to a member of the fraternity or sorority they are rushing. Traditionally, a legacy has a parent or sibling that is a member, but some organizations have expanded on their definition of a legacy's relation to members.
- Line – term used by National Pan-Hellenic Council for members who join in the same semester; similar to class
- Local – a fraternity or sorority with only one chapter.
- National – a fraternity or sorority with two or more chapters, both of which are in different states within the same nation
- Pledge – a person who has accepted a bid from a fraternity or sorority but has not yet been initiated, sometimes also called an associate member
- Pledge class – pledges who were recruited in the same semester or cycle
- Pledge pin – a pin worn by pledges for the duration of the pledging period. It is usually given to a pledge following a ceremony when they are first offered membership in the organization and can be worn until their initiation. With some organizations, especially those that no longer have a pledge process, it may be called a new member pin. See also badge.
- Potential new member (PNM) – one who is in the process of seeking a bid.
- Rush – the process of recruitment to a fraternity or sorority.
- Rushee – one who is in the process of seeking a bid.
- Sign – a unique hand signal used between members of a fraternity or sorority
- Sister – term used by sorority members when referring to each other or an active member of a sorority
- Soror – term used by sorority members when referring to each other, mostly within National Pan-Hellenic Council sororities
- Step dance – form of traditional African American dance popularized by National Pan-Hellenic Council members as synchronized group routines. Now also performed by some multi-cultural Greek letter organizations.
- Stepping – when members of a fraternity or sorority perform synchronized movements without music, such as clapping, chanting, jumping, or stomping their feet. Usually associated with National Pan-Hellenic Council members or multi-cultural Greek letter organizations.
- Strolling – when members of a fraternity or sorority move together or dance in a line, without music. Usually associated with National Pan-Hellenic Council members.

== See also ==
- Bibliography of college fraternities and sororities
- Collegiate secret societies in North America
- Defunct North American collegiate sororities
- High school fraternities and sororities
- Honor society
- Old boy network
- Secret society
