= Trudie Kibbe Reed =

5th President of Bethune–Cookman University
- In office August 2004 – 2012
- Preceded by: Oswald Perry Bronson
- Succeeded by: Edison O. Jackson

11th President of Philander Smith College
- In office 1998–2004
- Preceded by: Myer L. Titus
- Succeeded by: Walter Kimbrough

Personal details
- Born: 1947 (age 78–79)
- Education: University of Texas at Austin; Columbia University

Trudie Kibbe Reed (born 1947) is an American academic administrator who served as the fifth president of Bethune–Cookman University from 2004 to 2012. She was previously the eleventh president of Philander Smith College from 1998 to 2004. She was its first female president.

== Life ==
Reed was born in 1947. In 1966, she was among the first Black women to enroll at the University of Texas at Austin where she completed a bachelor's degree and master's degree in social work. She was an administrator at the United Methodist Church for 18 years including as the associate general secretary for the general council on ministries. In this role, she was active in the prison ministry, deaf ministry, and the ministry for the elderly. In 1977, Reed became the first African American member of the secretariat on the general commission on the status and role of women with the United Methodist Church. She earned a master's and Ed.D. from Teachers College, Columbia University. Her 1989 dissertation was titled, Understanding Adult Learning for Social Action in a Volunteer Setting. Elizabeth Kasl was her doctoral advisor.

Reed served as dean of the leadership institute and director of the graduate program at the graduate program at Columbia College. She founded A Leadership Journal: Women in Leadership - Sharing the Vision. She developed the first minor in Black family studies in the United States. Reed became the eleventh president and first female president of Philander Smith College in 1998, succeeding Myer L. Titus. She was succeeded by Walter M. Kimbrough. In August 2004, she became the fifth president of Bethune–Cookman University, succeeding Oswald Perry Bronson. She retired in 2012. She was succeeded by Edison O. Jackson.
