= Marching Orders =

Marching Orders may refer to:

- Marching Orders, New Zealand band on Flying Nun Records
- "Marching Orders", song by Kosheen from Damage
- "Marching Orders", song by Editors from In Dream
- Marching Orders (TV series), a 2018 Netflix documentary series
