= Bethune–Cookman University =

Historically black university in Daytona Beach, Florida, US

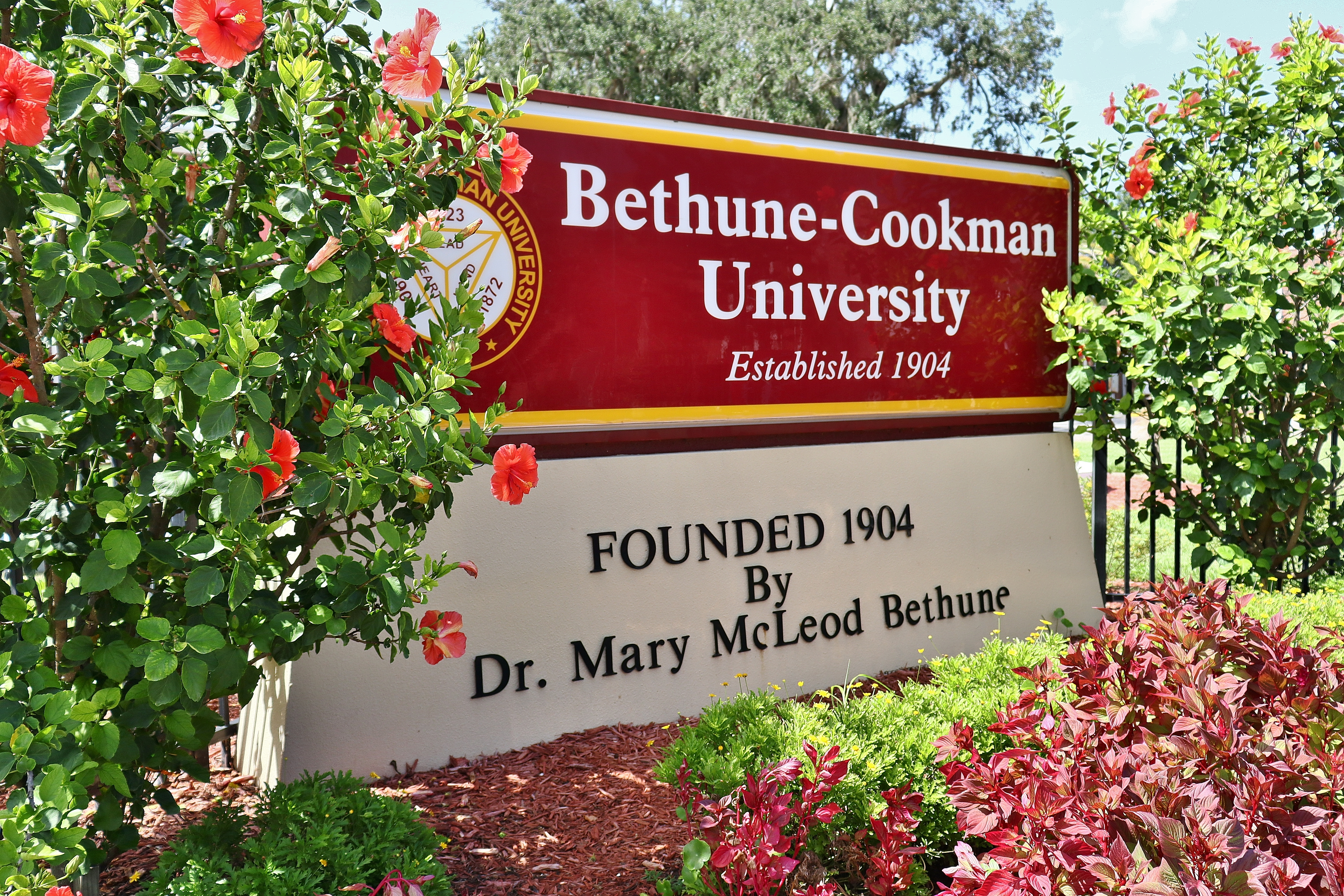
- Former names: Daytona Normal and Industrial Institute for Girls (1904–1927); Cookman Institute for Boys (1872–1927); Daytona Cookman Collegiate Institute (1927–1941); Bethune–Cookman College (1941–2007)
- Motto: On seal: "Heart, Head, Hand" "Enter to Learn, Depart to Serve"
- Type: Private historically-black university
- Established: October 3, 1904; 122 years ago
- Accreditation: SACS
- Religious affiliation: United Methodist Church
- Academic affiliations: Space-grant
- Endowment: $60 million (2025)
- President: Albert D. Mosley
- Students: 2,932 (fall 2025)
- Location: Daytona Beach, Florida, United States; 29°12′37″N 81°01′50″W
- Campus: 85.5 acres (34.6 ha); Small City
- Newspaper: Voice of the Wildcats
- Colors: Maroon and gold
- Nickname: Wildcats
- Sporting affiliations: NCAA Division I FCS - SWAC
- Mascot: Wil D Cat
- Website: www.cookman.edu

Bethune–Cookman University (B–CU or Bethune–Cookman) is a private historically black university in Daytona Beach, Florida, United States. It is affiliated with the United Methodist Church. The primary administration building, White Hall, and the Mary McLeod Bethune Home are historic venues.

== History ==
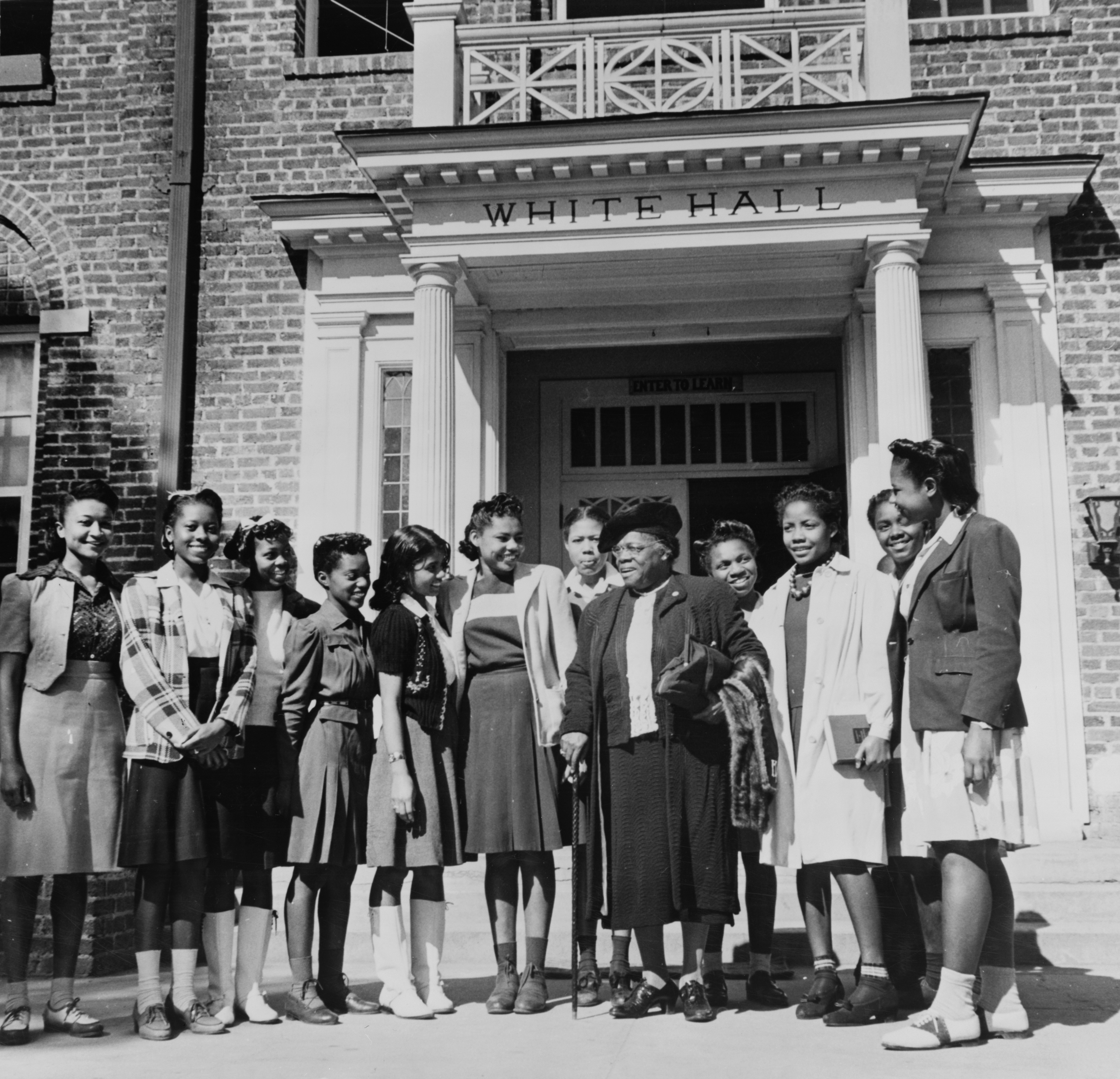
Mary McLeod Bethune with a group of students in 1943

Mary McLeod Bethune founded the Daytona Educational and Industrial Training School for Negro Girls in 1904. The first students met in the home of John Henry and Alice Smith Williams. The school underwent growth and development through the years. In 1923, it merged with the Cookman Institute of Jacksonville, Florida, founded in 1872, and became a co-ed high school. Bethune-Cookman College is a result of the merger in 1923 of the Daytona Normal and Industrial Institute for Girls, founded in 1904 by Mary McLeod Bethune, and Cookman Institute for Boys, founded in Jacksonville in 1872 by D. S. Darnell. The new institution, called the Daytona Cookman Collegiate Institute, became affiliated with the Board of Education of the Methodist Church. By 1931 the school had become a junior college.

In 1941, a four-year degree program was developed in liberal arts and teacher training. The school became a four-year college in 1941 when the Florida Department of Education approved a four-year baccalaureate program in Liberal Arts and Teacher Education. The name was changed to Bethune–Cookman College. In 1943, two years later, the first group of graduates received a Bachelor of Science Degree in Elementary Education. In 1947, the college received an "A" rating from the Southern Association of Colleges and Schools and the Florida State Department of Education.

The college was accredited in 1970 by the Southern Association of Colleges and Schools. In 1988, Bethune-Cookman College was admitted to candidacy status by the Southern Association of Colleges and Schools to offer a master's degree in science education. During this period, it joined the United Negro College Fund.

Since 2000, campus improvements have included the construction of the Center for Civic Engagement, the L. Gale Lemerand School of Nursing, the creation of the Alexis Pugh and Eugene Zimmerman Scholarship houses, and the provision of a university-owned house as an alumni center.

On February 14, 2007, the board of trustees approved a name change to Bethune–Cookman University.

In May 2017, Bethune–Cookman University faced criticism when it invited Betsy DeVos to speak at the commencement. Students protested and questioned the school's decision. The incident led to security measures at commencement, including a bag search. During her address, a majority of the crowd booed DeVos, with students standing up and turning their backs to her.

In January 2018, the university sued former university president Edison Jackson and others involved in a $306 million construction deal alleging fraud, corruption, and bribery.

The university was placed on probation by its accreditor, the Southern Association of Colleges and Schools, in the summer of 2018. The accreditor cited failings in multiple areas, including integrity, governing board characteristics, financial resources, financial responsibility, and control of finances. The accreditation action followed significant financial losses by the university - $28 million over the previous two years - and multiple lawsuits, including the one filed by the university against a former president Jackson. The nursing program had been placed on probation by its accreditor a few months earlier, related to academic issues. In September 2020, the university was taken off probation and maintained its accreditation.

=== Presidents ===
1. Mary McLeod Bethune (1904–1942, 1946 - interim)
2. James A. Colston (1942–1946)
3. Richard V. Moore, Sr. (1947–1975)
4. Oswald Perry Bronson, Sr. (1975–2004)
5. Trudie Kibbe Reed (2004–2012)
6. Edison O. Jackson (2012–2017)
7. Hubert L. Grimes (2017–2019; interim)
8. E. LaBrent Chrite (2019–2021)
9. Hiram Powell (2021–2022; interim)
10. Lawrence Drake (2022–2023; interim)
11. William Berry (2023–2025; acting)
12. Albert D. Mosley (2025-present)

== Academics ==
Bethune–Cookman University offers 39 bachelor's degree and 6 master's degree programs through one of the following schools and colleges:

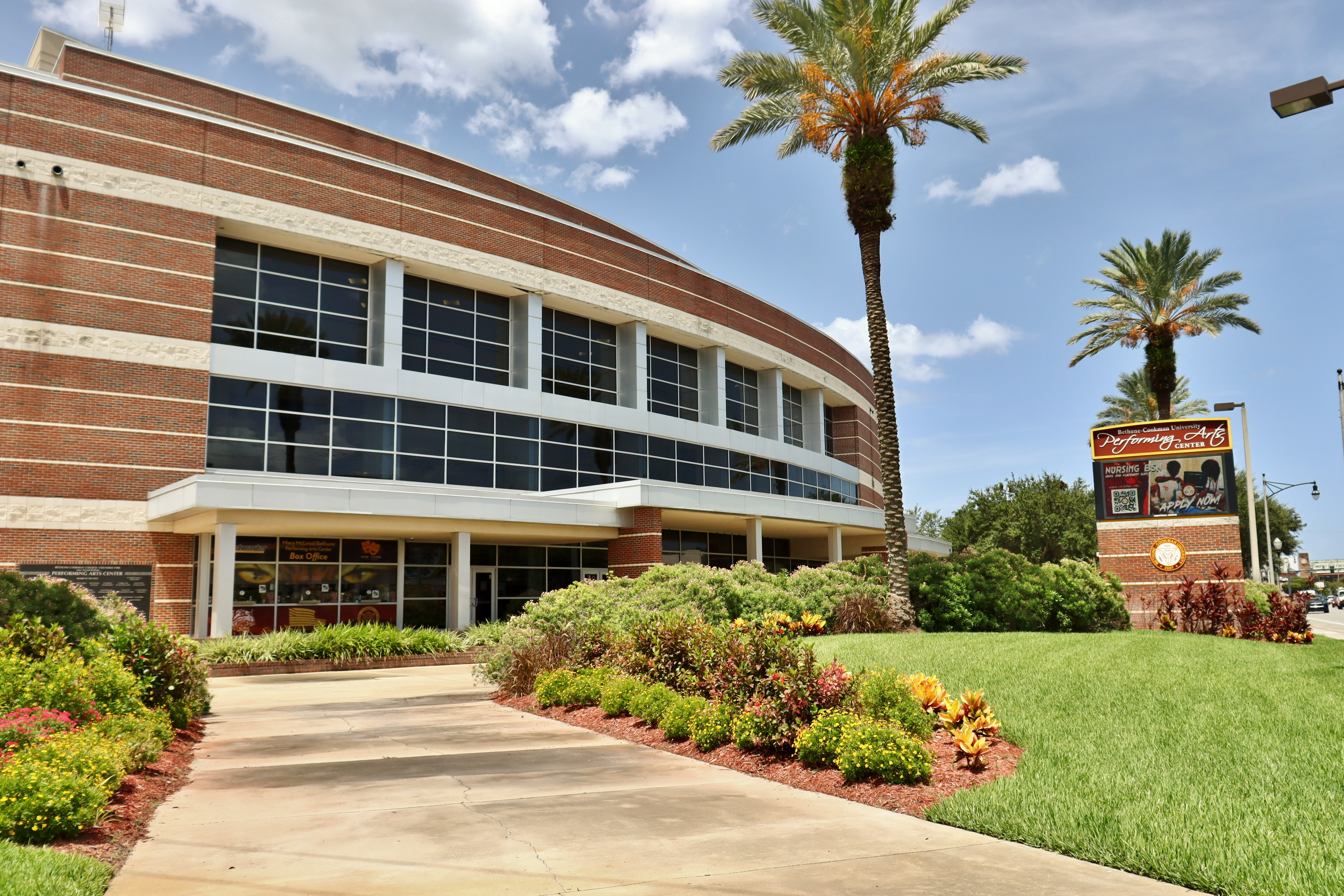
Bethune-Cookman's Performing Arts Center

- Nursing
- Business & Entrepreneurship
- Education
- Graduate Studies
- Health Sciences
- Hospitality Management
- Liberal Arts
- Online & Professional Studies
- Performing Arts & Communication
- Science, Engineering, Mathematics
- Undergraduate Studies
- Religion

=== Admissions ===
As of 2023, Bethune–Cookman admitted 100% of applicants, B–CU requiring neither ACT nor SAT test scores for admission, but with the average enrolled student who submitted scores having an SAT score of 905 or an ACT score of 16.5.

=== Rankings ===
As of 2023, U.S. News & World Report ranked B–CU #156-201 out of 201 National Liberal Arts Colleges, tied for #49 out of 79 Historically Black Colleges and Universities, and tied for #18 out of 196 Top Performers on Social Mobility. For 2024, U.S. News & World Report listed B-CU as the 6th least expensive private college in the United States. In 2024, Washington Monthly ranked B--CU 51st among 194 liberal arts colleges in the U.S. based on its contribution to the public good, as measured by social mobility, research, and promoting public service.

=== Library ===
The Harrison Rhodes Memorial Library was the original library of Bethune–Cookman College which was a tribute to author Harrison Rhodes of the wealthy Rhodes family. Harrison, along with his sister Margaret, championed the then Daytona Normal and Industrial School for Negro Girls. Upon Margaret's death, the balance of the Rhodes estate, some $560,000, was given to Bethune–Cookman College. The Harrison Rhodes Memorial building still exists as a campus hall after having been replaced by the Carl S. Swisher Library in 1941, which was mainly financed by the wealthy tobacco industrialist and philanthropist Carl S. Swisher.

== Athletics ==
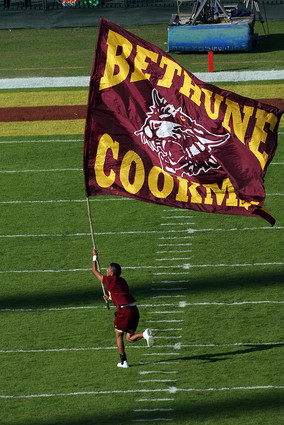
BCU athletics flag

Bethune-Cookman is a member of the Southwestern Athletic Conference (SWAC) and participates in NCAA Division I FCS. Bethune-Cookman sponsors 15 athletic programs.

== Student organizations ==
Student body composition as of May 2, 2022
Race and ethnicity	Total
Black	81%
Other (Note: Other consists of Multiracial Americans & those who prefer to not say.)	10%
Hispanic	5%
Foreign national	2%
White	1%
Economic diversity
Low-income (Note: The percentage of students who received an income-based federal Pell grant intended for low-income students.)	81%
Affluent (Note: The percentage of students who are a part of the American middle class at the bare minimum.)	19%

Bethune-Cookman has more than 80 student organizations on campus. This includes academic and honor societies, Greek fraternities and sororities, Greek-letter professional and service organizations, community service groups, leadership organizations, performance groups, and international and religious-based organizations.

=== The Marching Wildcats ===
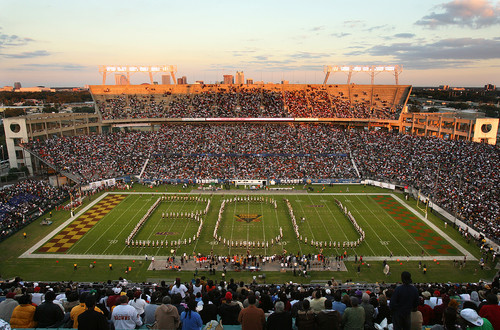
The Marching Wildcats (The Pride) of Bethune–Cookman create the "BCU" formation while playing before a packed Citrus Bowl Stadium at the Florida Classic.

Bethune-Cookman's marching band is known as "The Marching Wildcats." The marching band is the largest student organization on campus with over 300 members and starred in the Netflix series Marching Orders.

The marching band organization began in 1930 with only 30 instrumentalists.

== See also ==
- List of Bethune–Cookman University alumni
- Independent Colleges and Universities of Florida
