= Gregory J. Vincent =

American college president

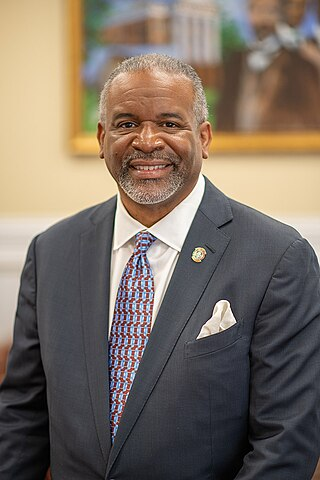

21st President of Talladega College
- In office July 2022 – June 2024
- Preceded by: Billy C. Hawkins
- Succeeded by: Walter Kimbrough (interim)

27th President of Hobart College and 16th President of William Smith College
- In office August 2017 – April 15, 2018
- Preceded by: Mark Gearan
- Succeeded by: Patrick A. McGuire (interim)

Personal details
- Born: New York City, U.S.
- Education: Hobart College (BA); Ohio State University (JD); University of Pennsylvania (EdD)
- Occupation: Professor, Lawyer, Academic administration

Gregory J. Vincent served as the 21st President of Talladega College located in Talladega, Alabama from July 2022 to June 2024. He is a national expert on civil rights, social justice, and campus culture. Vincent recently served as Professor of Educational Policy and Law, Inaugural Executive Director of the Education and Civil Rights Initiative, and Program Chair of the Ph.D. Senior Diversity Officer Specialization at the University of Kentucky. He previously served as the twenty-seventh President of the Hobart College and the sixteenth of William Smith College.

== Education ==
A native of New York City, Vincent attended public school and graduated from the Bronx High School of Science in 1979.

He received his bachelor's degree in history and economics from Hobart and William Smith Colleges in 1983. At the Colleges, he was on the Hobart basketball, cross-country and track & field teams. He also served as a resident assistant. When he graduated, he was presented with the Dr. Martin Luther King Jr. Leadership Award.

Vincent then received his J.D. degree from the Ohio State University Moritz College of Law in 1987 and his Ed.D. degree in education from the University of Pennsylvania in 2004. He is a Life Member of Alpha Phi Alpha fraternity. Vincent served as the forty-eighth Grand Sire Archon of Sigma Pi Phi fraternity.

== Career ==
Vincent worked at the University of Texas at Austin as vice president for Diversity and Community Engagement, W.K. Kellogg Professor of Community College Leadership and Professor of Law. During his appointment from 2005 to 2017, the Division of Diversity and Community Engagement grew to encompass a $50 million budget and more than 400 employees, 50 units, and 300 community partners and is now recognized as a national model. While at the University of Texas, Vincent was a spokesperson for the Fisher v. University of Texas case that was argued twice before the Supreme Court [see Fisher v. University of Texas (2013) and Fisher v. University of Texas (2016)].

From 2003 to 2005, Vincent was vice provost for institutional equity and diversity and law professor at the University of Oregon. From 1999 to 2003, Vincent was vice provost for academic affairs and campus diversity and law professor at the Louisiana State University. From 1995 to 1999, he was assistant vice chancellor for academic affairs at the University of Wisconsin-Madison.

Before entering academia, Vincent was the assistant attorney general in the Office of the Ohio Attorney General where he successfully argued several major civil rights cases before the Supreme Court of Ohio. These included Little Forest Medical Center of Akron v. Ohio Civil Rights Commission and The State, Ex Rel. Natalina Food Company, Appellant, v. Ohio Civil Rights.

Vincent currently is the owner and lead attorney at Gregory J. Vincent Law in Ohio. Since 2018 the firm has helped clients stay ahead of legal challenges in today’s evolving civil rights law, education law, and employment law.

== Awards and service ==
In 2016, he was named the Educator of the Year by the University of Pennsylvania. He received the Ohio State University Moritz College of Law Distinguished Service Award in 2012.

== Controversy ==
In 2018, Vincent was accused of plagiarizing several passages in the literature review section of his dissertation by an anonymous source claiming to be a Hobart and William Smith Colleges faculty member. Several media outlets confirmed that passages from his literature review were not cited correctly.

However, based on a review conducted by Penn's Graduate School of Education faculty members, Vincent was given the opportunity to make revisions to the literature review portion of his dissertation, under Penn Graduate School of Education faculty supervision, which were completed to their satisfaction and meant his degree now stands.
