= Sorority recruitment =

Processes for joining a sorority

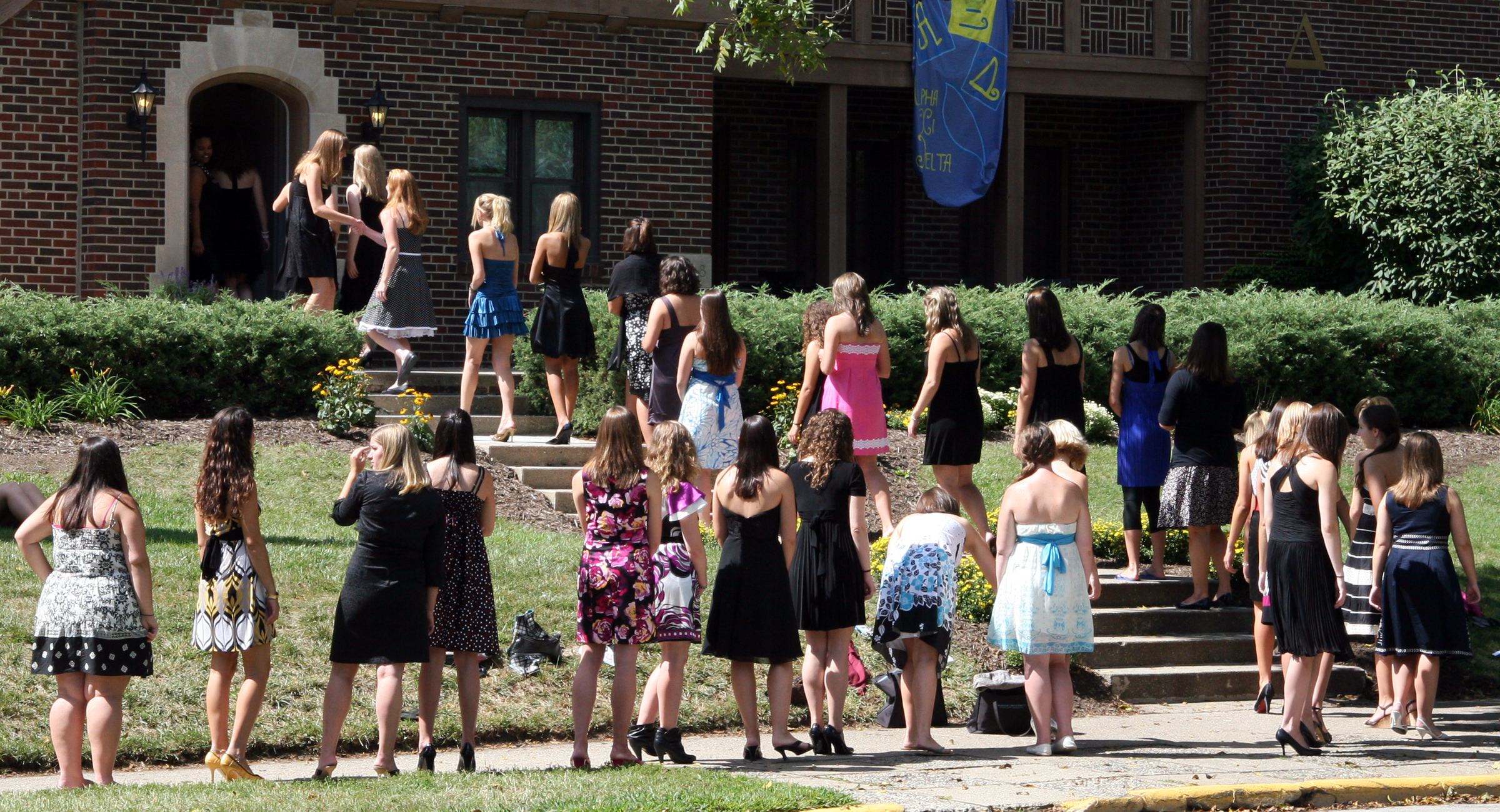
University students line up to rush a sorority.

Sorority recruitment or rush is a process in which university undergraduate women in certain institutions, primarily in the United States of America, but occasionally in Australia, Canada, and other countries, join a sorority. It is a procedure that includes a number of themed rounds in which different events are included. The rounds are followed by preference night and finally bid day in which a college student receives an invitation to join a certain sorority. The recruitment process is different at all universities and different universities have different sororities, meaning not all schools have the same chapters. Students are continually joining sororities more on college campuses as membership has gone up nationwide, growing more than 15 percent from 2008 to 2011, to 285,543 undergraduates, according to the National Panhellenic Conference, which represents 26 nationally recognized sororities. The National Panhellenic Conference also has the task of regulating sorority recruitment. The sorority houses follow specific rules to avoid infractions; the week before and during recruitment, girls are not allowed to wear their Sororities Greek letters out of their sorority houses to avoid influencing a potential new member (PNM).

== History ==
The recruitment process has been around since the beginning of the formation of sororities, the first, Alpha Delta Pi being founded in 1851 at Wesleyan Female College. The recruitment into Greek life on college campuses has experienced failures that ultimately led to the adoption of a centralized matching procedure whereby a matching is determined by preference lists submitted by the potential new members. In the beginning of the formation of Greek organizations, seniors were the only ones who were eligible to join; however, more students from other grade levels desired to be a part of Greek life and it was opened to juniors, then sophomores, and finally freshmen. The process of "lifting", in which a Greek member would leave one chapter and join another, was not uncommon in the late 1800s and early 1900s during the start of fraternities and sororities; however, it was frowned upon. To solve this issue and others, the first intersorority conference was called to discuss interfraternity cooperation. Although resolutions were passed, they had little effect until 1928 when the National Panhellenic Council was ready to focus on a centralized system of matching and the first mention of the preferential bidding system began. This preferential bidding system has since been incorporated into the current recruitment activities of sororities.

== Terms ==
There are different terms used in the recruitment process, they may vary from university to university, but some of the general terms include:

- Active: A sorority woman who has been formally initiated by her chapter.
- Bid: A formal invitation to join a sorority.
- Chapter: The local group of a larger national organization, designated by a special Greek letter name.
- Legacy: A woman whose grandmother, mother or sister is an alumna or an active member of a sorority.
- House director: An adult who lives in a sorority house and cares for all chapter members like a mother-figure away from home.
- Recruitment guide: Often referred to as “Rho Gammas” or “Pi Chis”, lead girls through the week of recruitment, making sure they attend the correct houses, answer questions, and offer support. They are a part of a certain sorority but not allowed to reveal which one until the end of the week.
- Initiation: The formal ceremony when a woman takes an oath and becomes a full member of her sorority.
- New member: The preferred term for a pledge, a member of a sorority or fraternity who has not been initiated as an active member.
- Panhellenic: A term meaning "all Greek." Refers to the local Panhellenic Council on campus.
- Pin: The sorority or fraternity membership badge.
- Potential New Member: Often referred to as PNM's, potential new member is the new term for rushee.

== Preparation ==
Some potential new members begin preparing in the summer before the school year begins. They create a resume emphasizing community service, leadership, academics and teamwork; letters of recommendation from alumnae of each chapter, preferably on the campus in question; and learning of letters before beginning the rush process. Some schools have no prerequisites, and girls can decide to go through the rush process weeks before. A potential new member will usually need to register for recruitment. Registration will vary by school and there may be a deadline and a fee for registration.

== Recruitment guides ==
PNMs will be assigned a recruitment guide to lead them through the week’s activities and assist the women by answering questions and giving moral support. The program of recruitment guides was developed by the National Panhellenic Council to provide support for the potential new members before, during, and after the recruitment process. These guides are called "Rho Gammas," "Pi Chis," "Gamma Chis" or something similar, but all have the same task no matter the title.

== Recruitment rounds ==
The process includes a number of rounds that usually last around 5 days, with one round per day. Rush occurs at different times of years depending on the university. It usually happens in early fall, mid January, and/or spring. There are different themes for each round, including philanthropy and skits. The first rounds are the shortest, getting longer each day. The beginning rounds include small conversations with sisters in the sorority, then comes philanthropy and skit rounds. Once the new member completes a round at a house she will go back to her recruitment counselor and make note of how she liked the chapter. The number of houses a new member visits narrows each day to preference night which is usually the longest and most serious round, in which a potential new member will visit only 1-3 chapter houses at a typical campus. Bid day is the final day of recruitment and can have several different outcomes: the PNM could receive a bid from her top choice, receive a bid from one of the other chapters she visited on preference night, not receive a bid, or receive a phone call offering a snap bid. Girls can either accept or deny the bids they are given, and the chapters have big celebrations welcoming the now new members into the sorority.

== Cost ==
Sororities often cost a considerable amount of money in order to join, with the price varying based on factors determined by national headquarters or university requirements.

== Criticism ==
Several sororities were criticized for their methods of recruitment. One notable incident was a recruitment video of Alpha Phi from the University of Alabama. The video was compared to Girls Gone Wild and was criticized by several for its lack of diversity and for its apparent sexism. The video was later removed from their YouTube channel. Another notable incident was a viral recruitment video of Alpha Delta Pi from the University of Texas where many individuals stack on top of each other behind their sorority house door. Many individuals on Twitter were horrified by the videos, some even comparing the recruitment method to the Gates of Hell. The sorority was also criticized for their lack of diversity.

== See also ==
- Fraternities and sororities#Rushing and pledging (recruitment and new member periods)
