= Fracket =

Disposable outerwear worn to college parties

A fracket is a disposable outerwear item that can be discarded at a party. The term was coined by American college students to describe an inexpensive jacket or sweatshirt worn solely to keep warm at fraternity parties, with the understanding that it may get lost.

== History ==
The term 'fracket' may have originated at Pennsylvania State University. In their study of university campus parties, sociologists Ashley Mears and Heather Mooney observed that the need for frackets arose from the lack of coat rooms at fraternity and final club houses. The challenge of keeping track of one’s jacket at a fraternity party, along with the need to stay warm while traveling to and from the event, led to the concept of frackets. The term 'fracket' is a portmanteau of 'frat jacket,' with 'fraternity' and 'jacket' as the root words.

What sets a fracket apart from a jacket is the owner's voluntary suspension of the expectation that the jacket will remain in their custody. This practice essentially allows for the situational social acceptance of theft under the pretense that the original owner expected the property to be stolen. As a result, wearers do not store anything valuable in the pockets of their fracket when they take it off.

Two key characteristics of the fracket are that it is inexpensive and distinctive. Mears and Mooney noted the care taken in the selection of frackets, as well as the evaluation of potential organizational members based on this selection. In 2023, CNET included a fracket on its list of ten wardrobe essentials to pack for college.

== Frackit ==
In 2014, University of Pennsylvania students Caroline Calle and Melissa Greenblatt created FRACKIT, a company that manufactured and sold waterproof hooded jackets. The company's name was derived from 'fracket.' Calle and Greenblatt were members of the Delta Delta Delta sorority at the University of Pennsylvania.

== Literary references ==
Author Anna Caritj mentions a fracket in her 2022 novel, Leda and the Swan.
