= Edison O. Jackson =

American academic administrator

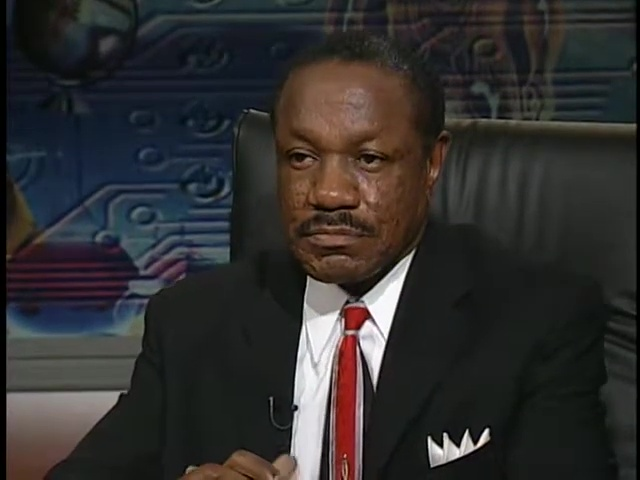
- Jackson on CUNY TV, 1999
- Born: October 1, 1942; Heathsville, Virginia, US
- Occupation: College administrator
- Title: President, vice president, dean, counselor

Academic background
- Education: Howard University, BS 1965 and MA 1968 Rutgers University, EdD 1983 New York Theological Seminary, MDiv 2005

Academic work
- Discipline: Counseling and Zoology
- Institutions: Bethune–Cookman University Medgar Evers College; Compton Community College; Essex County College Federal City College

Edison O. Jackson (born October 1, 1942) is an African American academic administrator. He was the president of Bethune-Cookman University, Medgar Evers College, and Compton Community College.

== Early life ==
Jackson was born in Heathsville, Virginia on October 1, 1942. He was one of twelve children and grew up on a farm.

He attended Howard University, graduating with a Bachelor of Science in zoology in 1965, and a Master of Arts in counseling in 1968. While at Howard, he joined the Alpha chapter of Phi Beta Sigma fraternity.

He earned a Doctor of Education from Rutgers University in 1983 with academic emphasis on the philosophy, function, role, and administration of urban educational institutions. While pursuing his Ed.D, Jackson taugh at Upsala College and Rutgers University.

He earned a Master of Divinity from New York Theological Seminary in 2005.

== Career ==
In 1968, Jackson became a senior counselor and instructor at the Federal City College in Washington, D.C. He became the supervisor of counselors at the Shaw Residence Half-Way Home in Washington, D.C. He was also a senior counselor at the United Planning Organization and deputy director of the Offender Rehabilitation Program of the Legal Aid Agency in Washington, D.C.

Jackson moved to Essex County College in Essex County, New Jersey in December 1969 and served as association dean of student affairs. He became interim dean of student affairs, securing the permanent position of dean of student affairs on March 1, 1970. He was promoted to vice-president for student affairs in May 1974, being the college's executive vice president in a July 1980 restructuring. He left to become the president of Compton Community College in Compton, California, starting on July 1, 1985.

Jackson became the president of Medgar Evers College in New York City on September 1, 1989. He oversaw a capital campaign that raised $400 million. He retired as president emeritus in 2009. After retiring, Jackson wrote the book The Journey of a President.

On May 14, 2012, Jackson returned from retirement and became interim president of Bethune–Cookman University in Daytona Beach, Florida. He was installed as the university's president in December 2013. He retired on August 31, 2017, which was a year before his contract ended. There had been a grassroots effort to fire Jackson over a financial transparency and $300 million dormitory construction project; the students also protested his selection of Betsy DeVos as the 2017 commencement speaker. An investitagion showed that the university had an increase in enrollment and student retention, and was working toward a balanced budget under Jackson's leadership; furthermore, Jackson's signature had been forged on the original construction contract.

In 2018, Bethune–Cookman University sued Jackson, along with the developer and two other college administrators, claiming that there was corruption and fraud surrounding the construction the dorm. The university also claimed that Jackson overstated student enrollment by almost 1,000 and charnged personal travel expenses to his university credit card.

== Honors ==
Jackson was selected as the Man of the Year by the Martin Luther King Jr. Democratic Club of Compton in 1986. In 1995, Jackson received the Dr. Martin Luther King Jr. Humanitarian Award from the Shirley Chisholm Cultural Institute for Children. New York Governor George Pataki presented Jackson with the African-American Leaders Award for Excellence in State Service in 2002.

== Personal life ==
Jackson and his wife, Florence, have two children: Eulaynea and Terrence. She was a high school teacher and was also from Heathsville, Virginia, where they met in primary school.

Jackson was co-chair of the Crown Heights Coalition. In 2002, he was appointed as the Brooklyn member of the New York City Board of Education.

After he retired from Medgar Evers College, they moved back to Heathsville.
