= William Raimond Baird =

American publisher and editor

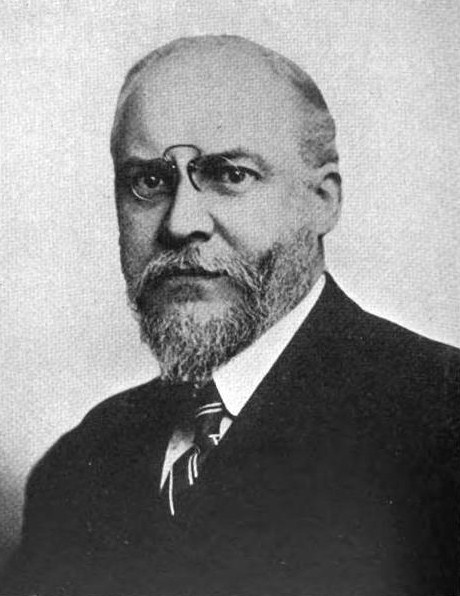
- Born: April 24, 1848
- Died: 1917 (aged 68–69)
- Education: Stevens Institute of Technology Columbia Law School
- Writing career
- Notable work: Baird's Manual of American College Fraternities

William Raimond Baird (April 24, 1848–1917) was an American author and publisher who was the namesake of Baird's Manual of American College Fraternities.

== Biography ==
He was born in 1848 and in 1878 he graduated from Stevens Institute of Technology in Hoboken, New Jersey with a degree in mechanical engineering. He exhaustively researched other organizations seeking a suitable partner to merge with his own 5-chapter regional fraternity Alpha Sigma Chi. He selected Beta Theta Pi, which absorbed ΑΣΧ in 1879. As no authoritative resource on the subject existed, Baird published his research for the benefit of the public as American College Fraternities. He continued to refine the work, publishing a total of eight editions under his name as author.

In addition to his membership in Alpha Sigma Chi, which the year after his graduation became the Sigma chapter of Beta Theta Pi, Baird was a member of Phi Delta Phi (international legal honor society) and Tau Beta Pi (engineering honor society).

After graduating from Stevens, Baird attended Columbia University Law School and graduated in 1882. While at Columbia, he founded the Alpha Alpha chapter of Beta Theta Pi fraternity. Baird also served as the Editor of the Beta Theta Pi Magazine in the years 1880-1883, 1885, and 1892-1915. He also wrote several books on the history and members of Beta Theta Pi fraternity.

Baird died on March 20, 1917 of heart disease.
