= Visual Communication Quarterly =

- Discipline: Visual communication
- Language: English
- Edited by: Lawrence Mullen

Publication details
- History: 1994-present
- Publisher: Routledge
- Frequency: Quarterly

Standard abbreviations
- ISO 4: Vis. Commun. Q.

Indexing
- ISSN: 1555-1393 (print); 1555-1407 (web)
- LCCN: 2005212197
- OCLC no.: 890565004

Links
- Journal homepage; Online access; Online archive; Journal page at publisher's website

Visual Communication Quarterly (VCQ) is a quarterly peer-reviewed academic journal covering all areas of visual communication. It is an official journal of the Association for Education in Journalism and Mass Communication's Visual Communication Division and was established in 1994. It is published by Routledge and the current (since 2025) editor-in-chief is Russell Chun.

During its first 11 years, the journal was affiliated with the National Press Photographers Association and was mailed to professionals along with News Photographer magazine.

Over its first 25 years, more than two-thirds of the research published in VCQ focused on the United States and more than half of it focused on photography. Other visual matter the journal has explored include, in descending order, television, film, graphs and graphics, advertisements, editorial cartoons, newspaper design, illustrations, logos and symbols, and websites and blogs.

== Abstracting and indexing ==
The journal is abstracted and indexed in:

- EBSCO databases
- Emerging Sources Citation Index
- ProQuest databases
- Scopus
