= Walter Kimbrough =

American academic administrator

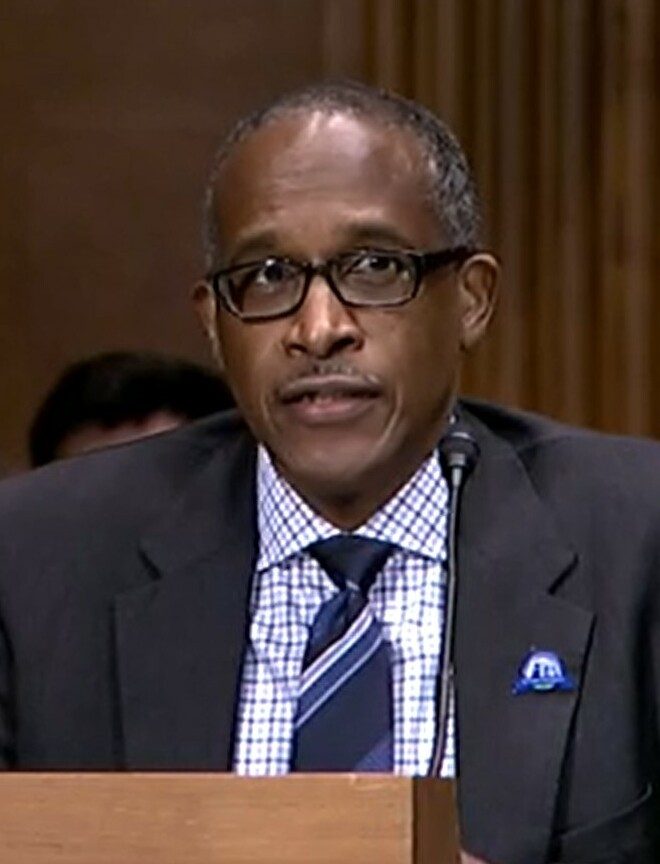
- Kimbrough in 2022

Interim President of Talladega College
- Incumbent
- Assumed office June 2024
- Preceded by: Gregory J. Vincent

7th President of Dillard University
- In office 2012 – June 2024
- Preceded by: James E. Lyons, Sr.

12th President of Philander Smith College
- In office 2004–2012
- Preceded by: Trudie Kibbe Reed
- Succeeded by: Johnny M. Moore

Personal details
- Born: c. 1967 (age 58–59) Atlanta, Georgia, U.S.
- Spouse: Adria Nobles
- Children: 2
- Education: University of Georgia (BA); Miami University (MA); Georgia State University (PhD)

Walter Kimbrough (born c. 1967) is an American academic administrator who served as the 7th president of Dillard University from 2012 to 2022. Kimbrough was previously the president of Philander Smith College from 2004 to 2012.

== Early life and education ==
Kimbrough was born in Atlanta, Georgia. He is the son of Rev. Walter Kimbrough, Sr. and Marjorie Kimbrough. He attended local public schools and graduated as salutatorian from Benjamin Elijah Mays High School in 1985.

He graduated from the University of Georgia, where he became a member of Alpha Phi Alpha, an African-American fraternity. He earned a master's degree from Miami University and a PhD in higher education from Georgia State University.

== Career ==
He is known for his work on historically black colleges and universities and on the college experience of African-American men.

Kimbrough describes membership in Alpha Phi Alpha as a key to helping him "survive" his years as a black student at the University of Georgia, which has a white-majority student body. He has written about the role of black fraternities and sororities, and became a specialist in student affairs. The Chronicle of Higher Education describes Kimbrough's book Black Greek 101: The Culture, Customs and Challenges of Black Fraternities and Sororities, as "the go-to book on the culture of black fraternities and sororities."

He has worked in student affairs at Emory University, Georgia State University, Old Dominion University, and was appointed at the age of 32 as Vice President of Student Affairs at Albany State University in 2000. In 2004 he was selected as President of Philander Smith College, serving into 2012. That year, he started as President of Dillard University, where he served until 2022.

== Personal life ==
Kimbrough married attorney Adria Nobles and they have two children together.

== Honors and awards ==
- Named as 1994 New Professional of the Year by the Association of Fraternity Advisors
- Selected in 2001 as a Nissan-ETS HBCU Fellow.
- In 2009, he was named by Diverse Issues in Higher Education as one of '25 To Watch'.
- In 2010, Ebony Magazine included him on its 'Power 100 list' of the "doers and influencers in the African-American community"
- In February 2013, he was named to NBC News/TheGrio.com's "100 African Americans making history today"
