= Matthew Hughey =

American sociologist

- Born: August 1, 1976 (age 49)
- Education: University of North Carolina at Greensboro (B.A., 1999); Ohio University (M.Ed., 2002); University of Virginia (Ph.D., 2009)
- Known for: Sociology of race
- Awards: 2014 Distinguished Early Career Award from the American Sociological Association’s Section on Racial and Ethnic Minorities
- Scientific career
- Fields: Sociology
- Institutions: University of Connecticut
- Thesis: White guise: the common trajectory of the white antiracist & racist movement (2009)
- Doctoral advisor: Milton Vickerman

Matthew Windust Hughey is an American sociologist known for his work on race and racism. He is Professor of Sociology at the University of Connecticut, where he is also an adjunct faculty member in the Africana Studies Institute; American Studies Program; Institute for Collaboration on Health, Intervention, & Policy; Sustainable Global Cities Initiative, and; graduate certificate program in Indigeneity, Race, Ethnicity, & Politics. His work has included studying whiteness, race and media, race and politics, racism and racial assumptions within genetic and genomic science, and racism and racial identity in white and black American fraternities and sororities.

He first came to national attention for his book White Bound: Nationalists, Antiracists, and the Shared Meanings of Race, originally published in 2012.

== Early life ==
Hughey was born in Los Angeles, California. He was raised in Asheville, North Carolina. He received his elementary and middle education through The Calvert School curriculum of Baltimore, Maryland before attending Asheville High School. After briefly living in Kingston, Jamaica, Hughey went on to pursue an undergrad degree at the University of North Carolina at Greensboro. While in college he became a member of the historically black Greek-letter organization, Phi Beta Sigma fraternity. He graduated in 1999 as a sociology major and as class president. Hughey proceeded to earn a Master of Education degree in cultural studies from Ohio University in 2002. He completed his doctorate in sociology at the University of Virginia in 2009. While earning his PhD, Hughey was a research fellow for the Center for the Study of Local Knowledge in the Carter G. Woodson Institute for African-American and African Studies and later worked as an instructor in the Department of Sociology, Program of Media Studies, and Program of African American Studies.

== Career honors ==
Hughey is recognized as a sociologist of race and racism drawing from several intellectual traditions, notably cultural and critical theory. He has held invited, honorary, and competitive scholarly positions at several institutions globally: School of Law at the University of Kent (Canterbury, England), Department of Sociology at Trinity College-Dublin (Dublin, Ireland), the Institute of Advanced Study at the University of Warwick (Coventry, United Kingdom), the Center for the Study of Ethnicity and Race at Columbia University (New York City, USA), and the postgraduate school at University of the Free State (Bloemfontein, South Africa). He is currently affiliate faculty in Critical Studies in Higher Education Transformation at Nelson Mandela University (Port Elizabeth, South Africa), the Knowledge, Power, and Politics Research Cluster at University of Cambridge (Cambridge, England), and the Research Group on Gender, Identity, and Diversity at University of Barcelona (Barcelona, Spain). Hughey's research, university teaching, and mentoring has also received numerous commendations:

- 2009. Distinguished Faculty Award, Z Society, University of Virginia
- 2011. Prevention for A Safer Society Award (for 12 Angry Men), National Council on Crime and Delinquency
- 2013. Finalist, C. Wright Mills Book Award (for White Bound), Society for the Study of Social Problems
- 2013. Honorable Mention, Book Award (for White Bound), Association for Humanist Sociology
- 2014. Distinguished Early Career Award, Section on Racial and Ethnic Minorities, American Sociological Association
- 2014. Eduardo Bonilla-Silva Outstanding Book Award (for White Bound), Society for the Study of Social Problems (co-winner)
- 2016. Helena Znaniecki Lopata Mentoring Award, Society for the Study of Symbolic Interaction
- 2016. Outstanding Publication Award (for The White Savior Film), Southwestern Sociological Association
- 2017. Excellence in Research Award—Social Sciences, University of Connecticut, College of Liberal Arts & Sciences

== Selected bibliography ==
=== Books ===
- 2010. with Gregory S. Parks. 12 Angry Men: True Stories of Being a Black Man in America Today. The New Press (foreword by Lani Guinier).
- 2011. with Gregory S. Parks. Black Greek-Letter Organizations, 2.0: New Directions in the Study of African American Fraternities and Sororities. University Press of Mississippi (foreword by Theda Skocpol).
- 2011. with Gregory S. Parks. The Obamas and a (Post) Racial America? Oxford University Press (foreword by Charles J. Ogletree).
- 2012. White Bound: Nationalists, Antiracists, and the Shared Meanings of Race. Stanford University Press.
- 2013. Race and Ethnicity in Secret and Exclusive Social Orders: Blood and Shadow. Taylor and Francis.
- 2014. The White Savior Film: Content, Critics, and Consumption. Temple University Press
- 2014. with Gregory S. Parks. The Wrongs of the Right: Language, Race, and the Republican Party in the Age of Obama. New York University Press.
- 2020. with Gregory S. Parks. "A Pledge with Purpose: Black Sororities and Fraternities and the Fight for Equality." New York University Press.
- 2020. with Emma Gonzalez-Lesser. "Racialized Media: The Design, Delivery, and Decoding of Race and Ethnicity." New York University Press.

=== Special Journal Issues ===
- 2012. with Gregory S. Parks. “Black Fraternal Organizations.” Journal of African American Studies 16(4):565-729.
- 2013. “Blood and Shadow: Race and Ethnicity in Secret and Exclusive Associations.” Ethnic and Racial Studies 36(2):237-383.
- 2015. with David G. Embrick and Ashley Woody Doane. “The Mechanisms of Color-Blind Racism and the Racialized Social System.” American Behavioral Scientist 59(11):1347-1525.
- 2015. with W. Carson Byrd. “Race, Racial Inequality, and Biological Determinism in the Genetic and Genomic Era.” The Annals of the American Academy of Political and Social Science 661(1):8-258.

=== Articles ===
- 2008. “Virtual (Br)others and (Re)sisters: Authentic Black Fraternity and Sorority Identity on the Internet.” Journal of Contemporary Ethnography 37(5):528-560.
- 2008. “Brotherhood or Brothers in the ‘Hood? Debunking the ‘Educated Gang’ Thesis as Black Fraternity and Sorority Slander.” Race, Ethnicity, and Education 11(4):443-463.
- 2009. “Cinethetic Racism: White Redemption and Black Stereotypes in ‘Magical Negro’ Films.” Social Problems 56(3):543-577.
- 2010. “The White Savior Film and Reviewers’ Reception.” Symbolic Interaction 33(3):475-496.
- 2010. “A Paradox of Participation: Nonwhites in White Sororities and Fraternities.” Social Problems 57(4):653-679
- 2010. “The (Dis)similarities of White Racial Identities: The Conceptual Framework of ‘Hegemonic Whiteness.’” Ethnic and Racial Studies 33(8):1289-1309.
- 2011. “Backstage Discourse and the Reproduction of White Masculinities.” The Sociological Quarterly 52(1):132-153.
- 2011. “Re-membering Black Greeks: Racial Memory and Identity in Stomp the Yard.” Critical Sociology 37(1):103-123.
- 2012. “Stigma Allure and White Antiracist Identity Management.” Social Psychology Quarterly 75(3):219-241.
- 2012. “Color Capital, White Debt, and the Paradox of Strong White Racial Identities.” Du Bois Review: Social Science Research on Race 9(1):169-200.
- 2012. “Show Me Your Papers! Obama’s Birth and the Whiteness of Belonging.” Qualitative Sociology 35(2):163-181.
- 2012. “Black Guys and White Guise: The Discursive Construction of White Masculinity.” Journal of Contemporary Ethnography 41(1):96-125.
- 2013. with W. Carson Byrd. “The Souls of White Folk Beyond Formation and Structure: Bound to Identity.” Ethnic and Racial Studies 36(6):974-981.
- 2013. with Jessie Daniels. “Racist Comments at Online News Sites: A Methodological Dilemma for Discourse Analysis.” Media, Culture, and Society 35(3):332-347.
- 2013. with Joanna Hunter. “‘It’s Not Written On Their Skin Like It Is Ours.’ Greek-Letter Organizations in the Age of the Multicultural Imperative.” Ethnicities 13(5):519-543.
- 2013. with Gregory S. Parks and Shayne Jones. “Victimology, Personality, and Hazing: A Study of Black Greek-Letter Organizations.” North Carolina Central Law Review 36(1):16-40.
- 2013. with Gregory S. Parks and Shayne Jones. “Belief, Truth, and Pro-Social Organizational Deviance.” Howard Law Journal 56(2):399-445.
- 2014. with Gregory S. Parks, Rashawn Ray, and Shayne Jones. “Complicit in their Own Demise?” Law & Social Inquiry 39(4):938–972.
- 2014. with Gregory S. Parks. “Opposing Affirmative Action: The Social-Psychology of Political Ideology and Racial Attitudes.” Howard Law Journal 57(2):513-543.
- 2014. “Identity Isomorphism: Role Schemas and White Masculinity Formation.” Sociological Inquiry 84(2):264-293.
- 2014. “White Backlash in the ‘Post-Racial’ United States.” Ethnic and Racial Studies Review 37(5):721-730.
- 2014. “Survival of the Fastest? The Media Spectacle of Black Athleticism and Biological Determinism.” Contexts 13(1):56-8.
- 2015. “The Five I’s of Five-O: Racial Ideologies, Institutions, Interests, Identities, and Interactions of Police Violence.” Critical Sociology 41(6):857-871.
- 2015. with Gregory S. Parks and Shayne Jones. “Hazing as Crime: An Empirical Analysis of Criminological Antecedents." Law and Psychology Review 39.
- 2015. with Gregory S. Parks, Shayne Jones, and Jonathan Michael Cox. “White Boys Drink, Black Girls Yell?: A Racialized and Gendered Analysis of Violent Hazing and the Law.” The Journal of Gender, Race & Justice 18(1):93-158.
- 2015. with Adam Love. “Out of Bounds? Racial Discourse on College Basketball Message Boards.” Ethnic and Racial Studies 38(6):877-893.
- 2015. “We’ve Been Framed! A Focus on Identity and Interaction for a Better Vision of Racialized Social Movements.” Sociology of Race and Ethnicity 1(1):137-152.
- 2016. with Gregory S. Parks. “A Choice of Weapons: The X-Men and the Metaphor for Approaches to Racial Equality.” Indiana Law Journal 92(1):1-26.
- 2016. with Michael Rosino. “Who’s Invited to the (Political) Party: Race and Party Politics in the United States.” Ethnic and Racial Studies Review 39(3):325-332.
- 2017. with Wendy M. Laybourn and Devon R. Goss. “‘You're either one of us or you're not’: Racial Hierarchy and Non-Black Members of Black Greek-Letter Organizations.” Sociology of Race and Ethnicity 3(4):552-565.
- 2017. with Adam Love and Bianca Gonzalez-Sobrino. “Excessive Celebration? The Racialization of Recruiting Commitments on College Football Internet Message Boards.” Sociology of Sport Journal 34(3):235-247.
- 2017. with Devon Goss and W. Carson Byrd. "Racial Authenticity and Familial Acceptance Among Transracial Adoptees: A Bothersome Bargain of Belonging." Symbolic Interaction 40(2):147-168.
- 2017. with Michael Rosino. “Speaking through Silence: Racial Discourse and Identity Construction in Mass Mediated Debates on the ‘War on Drugs’.” Social Currents 4(3):246-264.
- 2017. with Carol Ann Jackson. “The Dimensions of Racialization and the Inner City School.” The Annals of the American Academy of Political and Social Science 673(1):312-329.
