= Omicron Kappa Epsilon =

North American collegiate fraternity

- ΟΚΕ
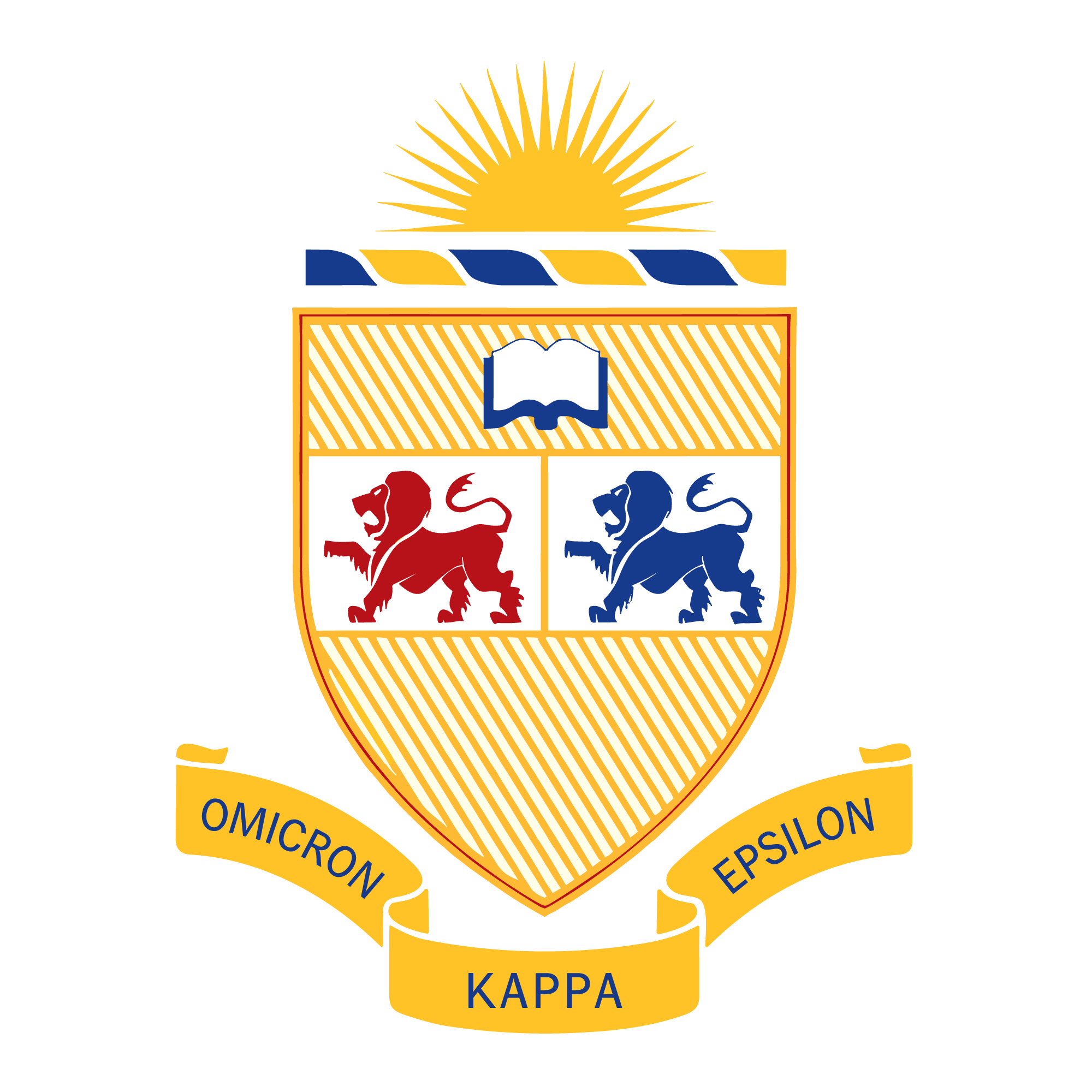
- Founded: January 1834; 192 years ago Union College
- Type: Social
- Affiliation: Independent
- Status: Active
- Scope: Local
- Motto: "The pursuit of friendship, love, and truth."
- Colors: Blue and Gold
- Publication: Frater Footsteps
- Chapters: 1
- Nickname: Fraters, O.K.E., Fraternal
- Headquarters: 337 College Avenue; Holland, Michigan 49423; United States
- Website: www.thefraternalsociety.org

Omicron Kappa Epsilon (ΟΚΕ), commonly known as The Fraternal Society, is a North American fraternity founded at Union College in 1834. It is the sixth oldest social fraternity still in existence in the United States. The society's only active chapter is at Hope College, where it is the oldest fraternity on campus.

== History ==
Omicron Kappa Epsilon was founded at Union College in Schenectady, New York. Before fraternities gained popularity, literary societies with Greek names were present at many colleges and universities. At Union College, Kappa Alpha Society, Delta Phi, and Sigma Phi evolved and organized as "secret" societies, now considered the first collegiate fraternities in the United States.

By the end of 1833, these fraternities presented their constitutions to Union's president, Dr. Eliphalet Nott. Nott authorized the fraternities for membership by juniors and seniors, despite opposition from some students and faculty members. After Nott's speech outlining the conditions and benefits of such organizations, students John Dales, Hiram Gibbons, and Robert Hume discussed the new opportunity, wondering if their friendship could lead to a small society for "mutual good". This led to the formation of Omicron Kappa Epsilon, an abbreviation of the Greek motto Oligoi Kai Eklektoi, meaning "Few and Chosen."

In January 1834, Dales, Gibbons, and Hume met with James Beattie, Robert Beattie, Henry Northrup, Frederick Pollard, Adam Smith, and Charles Stillman to formally establish Omicron Kappa Epsilon to promote peace, friendship, and virtue. They appointed a committee to draft a constitution which was later adopted and signed by all nine men, along with James Nichols. Thus, the ten founders of Omicron Kappa Epsilon are:

- James Beattie
- Robert Beattie
- John Dales
- Hiram Gibbons
- Robert Hume
- James Nichols
- Henry Northrup
- Frederick Pollard
- Adam Smith
- Charles Stillman

In May 1834, Pollard suggested the name Fraternal Society or Societatis Fratrum in Latin; the group unanimously accepted the name. Each member also contributed to the design of the fraternity's badge, the decorative paddle.

In 1858, the Fraternal Society decided to affiliate with a national fraternity and searched for a like-minded group not already located at Union College. In early 1859, sixteen members of the society and a tutor signed a petition to establish a chapter of Alpha Delta Phi at Union. Richard Salter Storrs, president of Alpha Delta Phi, issued a charter for Union chapter on June 14, 1859. After Union chapter's installation, Omicron Kappa Epsilon ceased to exist. The new chapter of Alpha Delta Phi held its first meeting on July 15, 1859, and decided not to admit the many alumni of Omicron Kappa Epsilon, only accepting five men: George Adlington Brandreth 1847, William Root Adams 1851, Lewis Collins 1853, John A. De Remer 1857, and Alexander McAllister Thorburn 1857.

In 1863, Rev. Phillip Phelps Jr., an Omicron Kappa Epsilon alumnus from Union College, re-activated the Fraternal Society at Holland Academy in Holland, Michigan. Two years later, Holland Academy became Hope College, with Phelps as its first president. Since then, the society has continued to operate as a local social fraternity at Hope College. In January 1928, the society announced its plans to build a $40,000 centenary memorial fraternity house, becoming the first fraternity at Hope College to have a chapter house.

== Symbols ==
Omicron Kappa Epsilon's colors are blue and gold. The society's Greek letters, ΟΚΕ, stand for Oligoi Kai Eklektoi in Greek, meaning “Few and Chosen.” Its motto is "the pursuit of friendship, love and truth".

Its crest is a shield topped by a yellow and blue "rope that binds the men of Fraternal" and a gold "sun that never sets on Fraternal." On the gold shield are a blue and white book of knowledge, a red lion representing strength, and a blue lion that represents courage.

== Activities ==
Omicron Kappa Epsilon's activities include social events, charitable and service projects, sports, and scholarly lectures.

== Chapters ==
Following is a list of Omicron Kappa Epsilon chapters. Active chapters are indicated in bold. Inactive chapters are in italic.

Chapter	Chartered/Range	Institution	Location	Status	References
Fraternal Society (Alpha)	January 1834 – 1859	Union College	Schenectady, New York	Withdrew (**ΑΔΦ**)	(Note: Chapter merged with Alpha Delta Phi, becoming its Union chapter on June 14, 1859.)
**Fraternal Society**	1863	Hope College	Holland, Michigan	Active	(Note: Chapter formed as the Fraternal Society at Holland Academy, which became Hope College in 1865.)
**Fraternal Society Alumni Association**			Holland, Michigan	Active	

== Notable members ==
- Tim Brown (Hope) - former president of Western Theological Seminary
- Gerrit J. Diekema (Hope) - former United States congressman
- Edward D. Dimnent (Hope) – former president of Hope College
- James E. Bultman (Hope) – former president of Hope College and former president of Northwestern College
- Dave Engbers (Hope) - co-founder, Founders Brewing Company
- John Milton Gregory (Union) – first president of the University of Illinois, second president of Kalamazoo College
- Mayo A. Hadden Jr. (Hope) – World War II Ace and U.S. Navy Rear Admiral
- Henry Halleck (Union) - Civil War general
- Gerrit J. Kollen (Hope) – former president of Hope College
- Arend Lubbers (Hope) – former president of Grand Valley State University and former president of Central College
- A. J. Muste (Hope) – clergy, author, and noted activist with the labor, antiwar, and civil rights movements
- Rev. Philip Phelps Jr. (Union) – first president of Hope College
- James L. Poppen (Hope) – pioneering neurosurgeon
- Jason Spaulding (Hope) - co-founder, New Holland Brewing Company
- Rev. Nathaniel G. Spaulding (Union) – president of Fort Plain Seminary and Collegiate Institute and president of the Amenia Seminary
- Mike Stevens (Hope) - co-founder, Founders Brewing Company
- Brett VanderKamp (Hope) - co-founder, New Holland Brewing Company
- Calvin A. Vander Werf (Hope) – former president of Hope College
- Ame Vennema (Hope) – former president of Hope College

== See also ==
- Alpha Delta Phi
- List of social fraternities and sororities
- Mother of Fraternities
