= Mother of Fraternities =

Nickname for Union College

The Mother of Fraternities usually refers to Union College in Schenectady, New York, U.S., or Miami University in Oxford, Ohio, U.S., both of which founded many early collegiate fraternities.

== Origin ==
In the 19th century, multi-chapter collegiate fraternities often referred to their founding chapter as the "mother" or "parent" chapter. These mother chapters were said to "birth" new chapters at other institutions. Thus, the name "Mother of Fraternities" originated from the language commonly in use by fraternities at the time. For example, in March 1887, one writer speculated that Virginia, which was already known as the "Mother of Presidents", might soon have a claim to the name "Mother of Fraternities" after Pi Alpha Epsilon was established at Washington and Lee University.

== History ==
=== Union College ===
An April 2012 article in The New York Times said, "Union College, a small, private liberal arts school in Schenectady, N.Y., has had its share of historic achievements, from being the first college chartered in New York to holding the title of the Mother of Fraternities." Union College was the founding campus for the first three social fraternities in the United States: Kappa Alpha Society in 1825, Sigma Phi Society in 1827, and Delta Phi in 1827. These three fraternities are known collectively as the Union Triad. Other early fraternities established at Union, include Psi Upsilon in 1833, Omicron Kappa Epsilon in 1834, Chi Psi in 1841, and Theta Delta Chi in 1847.

In June 1895, The New York Times reported that Union College was called "The Mother of Fraternities. In April 1897, The Cosmopolitan also called Union the "mother of fraternities". In 1899, The Cyclopædia of Fraternities reported that the college was known as the "mother of fraternities". The 1909–1910 edition of The American College calls Union College the "mother of fraternities".

In his 2009 history of fraternities, Nicholas L. Syrett notes that "Union College was the 'Mother of Fraternities' because so many mother chapters (including the very first) were founded there." Similarly, African American Fraternities and Sororities identifies Union as the "Mother of Fraternities" in 2012.

=== Miami University ===
The 1893 Miami University yearbook,The Recensio, said, "Miami is the mother of fraternities. Three of the four now existing here were founded in this college...These fraternities now are national, and to those of us who belong to the Alpha's of our respective brotherhoods, there is a quick sense of our positions and a pride in our relationship to our 'frat'." President of Miami University, Guy Potter Benton, noted that the college had "a peculiar distinction as the 'Mother of Fraternities'" in his annual report in 1905. In June 1914, Benton, then president of the University of Vermont wrote, "'The Union Triad' of ΚΑ, ΣΦ, and ΔΦ and the 'Miami Triad' of ΒΘΠ, ΦΔΘ, and ΣΧ, have given to Union College and Miami University, each, their proud and rightful title, 'mother of fraternities'." Benton was a member of Phi Delta Theta. By 1925, Banta's Greek Exchange referred to Union College and Miami University as "mother of fraternities", having both established a triad of national fraternities.

Miami's claim to the Mother of Fraternities label is based on the rise of the Miami Triad: Beta Theta Pi formed in 1839, Phi Delta Theta in 1848, and Sigma Chi in 1855; these fraternities were founded during the school's historical period known as "Old Miami". Others Greek letter organizations founded at Miami include Delta Zeta women's fraternity in 1902 and Phi Kappa Tau in 1906. More than forty Greek letter organizations were founded at Miami University; some were short-lived but many eventually affiliated with national fraternal organizations. The June 1926 issue of The Arrow of Pi Beta Phi, identifies Miami as the Mother of Fraternities because it "has the distinction of being the mother of more academic fraternities than any other college".

In December 1989, The New York Times reported that "Miami [is] known as the Mother of Fraternities..." In June 2009, the U.S. House of Representatives and U.S. Senate passed a resolution honoring Miami University for its 200th anniversary; the resolution included, "Miami University is known as the 'Mother of Fraternities', as it is the Alpha chapter of 5 national Greek organizations, Beta Theta Pi, Sigma Chi, Phi Delta Theta, Phi Kappa Tau, and the Delta Zeta sorority." In 2015, Time noted that Miami is "nicknamed the mother of fraternities...."

== Other contenders ==
Phi Beta Kappa honor society was formed in 1776 at the College of William & Mary in Virginia. In 1905, The Eleusis of Chi Omega calls Phi Beta Kappa the "mother of fraternities" because it was the first American society with a Greek name. Similarly, the 1907 edition of The Sorority Handbook refers to Phi Beta Kappa as "the mother of fraternities".

Longwood University has been called the "Mother of Sororities" because it is the founding place of more national sororities than any other college. When it was the State Female Normal School, Longwood was the birthplace of the Farmville Four, including Kappa Delta in 1897, Sigma Sigma Sigma in 1898, Zeta Tau Alpha in 1898 and Alpha Sigma Alpha in 1901.

== See also ==
- Triad (American fraternities)

== External sources ==
- Shearer, Augustus A. "Beginnings of College Fraternities". Βήτα Θήτα Πί, vol. 11, no. 2 (November 1912) p. 128.
- Mother of Fraternities Ohio historic marker
