= Triad (American fraternities) =

Grouping of college organizations

The term Triad is used to designate a grouping of three national college fraternities or sororities that were founded at the same place. The most famous and oldest triad is the Union Triad at Union College in Schenectady, New York which includes some of the oldest national fraternities still in existence. The second triad that formed is the Miami Triad at Miami University in Oxford, Ohio. There is also the Syracuse Triad at Syracuse University in Syracuse, New York and the Lexington Triad in Lexington, Virginia.

There are also groupings of two fraternities that were established at the same place that are called Duos, including the Monmouth Duo at Monmouth College in Monmouth, Illinois and the Jefferson Duo at Jefferson College in Canonsburg, Pennsylvania.

== Lexington Triad ==
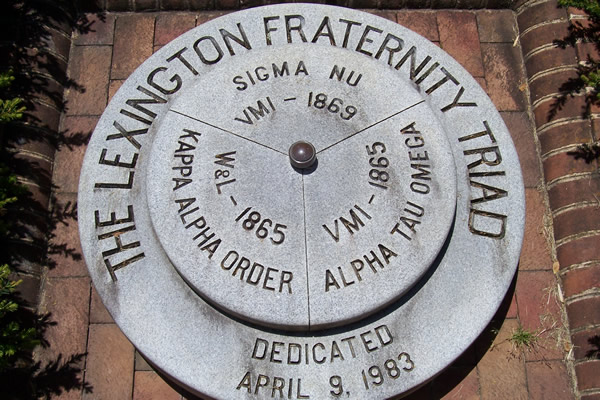
Monument for The Lexington Fraternity Triad in Lexington, Virginia

The Lexington Triad is a group of three fraternities founded immediately after the Civil War by students from two colleges in Lexington, Virginia: Alpha Tau Omega, Kappa Alpha Order and Sigma Nu.

Alpha Tau Omega was founded in Richmond, Virginia in 1865 by students from Virginia Military Institute. Kappa Alpha Order was founded in 1865 at Washington and Lee University. Sigma Nu was founded in 1869 at Virginia Military Institute. The national headquarters of the Kappa Alpha Order and Sigma Nu are still in Lexington.

=== Virginia Circle ===
The members of the Lexington Triad are sometimes grouped as part of the Virginia Circle, which includes several other fraternities founded in Virginia roughly during period of the Lexington Triad: Kappa Sigma and Pi Kappa Alpha at the University of Virginia and Sigma Phi Epsilon at Richmond College.

== Miami Triad ==
The Miami Triad refers to three fraternities founded at Miami University in Oxford, Ohio, in the 19th century: Beta Theta Pi in 1839, Phi Delta Theta in 1848, and Sigma Chi in 1855. Some fraternal historians compare the significance of the Miami Triad to that of the earlier Union Triad.

Delta Zeta sorority was founded at Miami University in 1902, and Phi Kappa Tau fraternity in 1906. Delta Sigma Epsilon sorority began there in 1914, merging in 1956 with Delta Zeta. The establishment of these numerous Greek organizations at Miami University resulted in it being known as the Mother of Fraternities.

It has been a tradition at some campuses that have chapters of each of the Miami Triad, such as the University of Kansas, and the University of Mississippi, to hold an annual party, formal, or ball, often referred to as "Miami Triad" or simply "Triad", to commemorate their tie to each other and the Miami Triad's place in Greek history. This tradition has waned in recent years and some schools have transformed the celebration into new events, such as the University of Kansas' Miami Triad Concert.

== Jefferson Triad ==
The Jefferson Triad consists of Phi Kappa Sigma, founded at the University of Pennsylvania in 1850, and Phi Gamma Delta and Phi Kappa Psi, founded in 1848 and 1852, respectively, at Jefferson College in Canonsburg, Pennsylvania. A third, Kappa Phi Lambda, was also founded there but dissolved in 1874. In 1865, Jefferson College combined with Washington College to become Washington & Jefferson College.

== Syracuse Triad ==
The Syracuse Triad is the name given to the three women's sororities founded at Syracuse University: Alpha Phi, Gamma Phi Beta, and Alpha Gamma Delta. Alpha Phi was founded in 1872 by 10 of the first 20 women admitted into the university. Gamma Phi Beta was founded in 1874 and with it came the term "sorority", which was coined for it at the time of its founding. Before that, women's Greek-letter organizations used the term "women's fraternity", since no more appropriate term existed. Alpha Gamma Delta completed the triad when it was established in 1904.

The three sororities maintain social bonds, coordinating special events and ceremonies for the three sororities on the Syracuse campus.

== Union Triad ==
The Union Triad is a group of the three Greek-letter social fraternities in North America that were founded at Union College in Schenectady, New York, including the Kappa Alpha Society that was established in 1825; the Sigma Phi Society established in 1827; and the Delta Phi established in 1827. These three fraternities are also some of the oldest surviving national fraternities that provided the template for the modern social fraternity.

Other fraternities which owe their birth to Union College include Psi Upsilon (1833), Omicron Kappa Epsilon (1834), Chi Psi (1841) and Theta Delta Chi (1847). Collectively, these many fraternities have given Union College the title Mother of Fraternities.

== Farmville Four ==
Four sororities were formed at Longwood University, which are billed as the Farmville Four. These include Kappa Delta (1897), Sigma Sigma Sigma (1898), Zeta Tau Alpha (1898), and Alpha Sigma Alpha (1901). The four faces of the campus bell tower commemorate these four organizations.

== See also ==
- Mother of Fraternities
