= John Hart Hunter =

Founder of Kappa Alpha Society(1807–1872)

- Rev. John Hart Hunter
- Born: May 3, 1807; New York City, USA
- Died: February 12, 1872 (aged 64); Galveston, Texas, USA
- Education: Union College; Princeton Theological Seminary
- Occupation: Pastor
- Known for: Founder of the Kappa Alpha Society and father of the modern American college fraternity.
- Spouse: Julia Maria Judson

John Hart Hunter (May 3, 1807 – February 12, 1872) is recognized as the father of the American college fraternity system. He founded the Kappa Alpha Society (KA) in 1825 at Union College.

== Early life and education ==
His father, John Hunter, emigrated from Dublin, Ireland to Philadelphia in 1805 and then moved to New York where he worked as a bookkeeper. Hunter, a superb mathematician, soon gave up business for teaching. The elder John Hunter married Sarah Hart of White Plains.

John Hart Hunter was born on May 3, 1807 in New York City. From his father, he gained a love of scholarship. The younger Hunter developed his early education through extensive reading at the Apprentices' Public Library in New York and particularly enjoyed reading the Waverly novels of Sir Walter Scott.

=== Union College ===
John Hart Hunter entered college directly into the Junior Class at Union in 1824. He quickly became one of the leading academic scholars of the school at age 17. When Arthur Burtis Jr. entered Union in 1825, also as a Junior following two years at Columbia, college president Eliphalet Nott personally insisted Hunter take him under his wing as a roommate. Thus Hunter's plans for a single room were disrupted, and indirectly President Nott set the stage for the foundation of Kappa Alpha.

On November 26, 1825, John Hart Hunter founded the Kappa Alpha Society, the world's first Greek letter social fraternity, along with eight other students: six of them seniors in the class of 1826, and two juniors of the class of 1827. The first meeting was held in Hunter's dorm room and included discussions of the zodiac.

Upon graduating near the top of his class at Union in 1826, Hunter was admitted to Princeton Theological Seminary where he studied until 1828.

Some records list him as having received a Doctor of Divinity degree, but as early as 1932 it was unclear what institution had awarded the degree.

== Career ==
=== Pastor ===
Hunter was ordained on December 17, 1828 at the Congregational Church of Fairfield, Connecticut and served as pastor there until January 1834.

Hunter went on to serve as pastor of the First Congregational Church in West Springfield, Massachusetts. At his installation as pastor on August 25, 1835, a sermon was delivered by William B. Sprague on the topic of religious ultraism. He was dismissed from the post in February 1837. He also briefly served as pastor of a congregation in Shrewsbury, New Jersey in 1837.

He served as a pastor in Bridgeport, Connecticut from 1839 to 1845. During this period, Hunter was described as "brilliant" but also "eccentric" and "impulsive". He was described as "a man of genius, but of that type of genius which is often erratic ... [and] sometimes approaches the borderland to insanity." After serving as pastor in Bridgeport, he retired from the pulpit as he was often frustrated by the "dogmatic and ecclesiastical systems with which I found myself connected."

=== Teacher and land speculator ===
He then became a teacher. From 1847 to 1851, he lived in New Utrecht, Brooklyn, in what is now Bay Ridge.

In 1857, Hunter moved west to Missouri with his son James, age 19, in hopes of improving the financial situation of his growing family. They had hoped to profit from land that Hunter had bought several years earlier. Hunter put the land to work for industrial purposes rather than simple farming. While in Missouri, he engaged in teaching and real estate.

He later traded the land in Missouri for deeds to land in Texas and moved to the area in 1859. There he "spent the remainder of his days in a somewhat wandering life in the west and southwest, preaching, teaching, trading in land - miscellaneously employeed." The American Civil War left him nearly penniless.

John Hart Hunter died of congestion of the lungs, today known as pulmonary edema, on February 11th or 22nd 1872, at City Hospital in Galveston, Texas. He was buried the next day, February 13, 1872, likely in Galveston's Old potter's field which is now known today as Oleander Cemetery in the Broadway Cemetery Historic District. Records of his burial and his grave were allegedly lost in the 1900 Gavelston Hurricane.

== Personal life ==
Hunter was said to enjoy the outdoors and enjoyed walking and fishing.

John Hunter married Julia Maria Judson (January 11, 1811 – October 14, 1905) in 1830. Julia was a well-educated member of a prominent Stratford, Connecticut, family. She was born in Stratford to Daniel and Sarah Judson. Julia graduated from Troy Female Seminary in 1827 and had been instrumental in campaigning for her late friend Emma Willard's induction into the Hall of Fame for Great Americans. Julia died at the age of 95 at her home at 62 West 93rd Street in New York City.

John and Julia Hunter had nine children, including Daniel Judson Hunter, Julia E. Hunter, Kate P. Hunter, James Hunter, Mary H. Hunter and four others. John and Julia's son Daniel Judson Hunter died at the age of 62 on February 2, 1907, at his home in New York.
