= Llenroc =

Villa in Ithaca, New York

- U.S. National Register of Historic Places
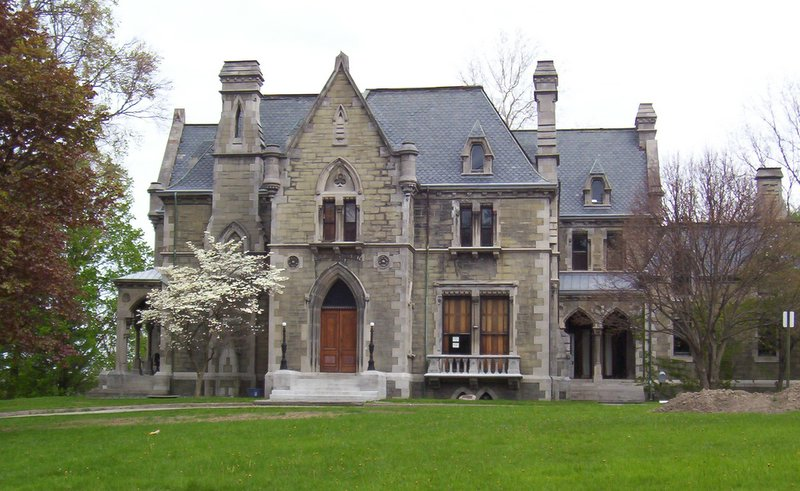
- Llenroc, the Delta Phi fraternity house at Cornell University and former residence of the university's founder

- Location within New York Location within the United States
- Location: 100 Cornell Avenue, Ithaca, New York, U.S.
- Coordinates: 42°26′48.13″N 76°29′32.05″W
- Built: 1865
- Architect: Nichols & Brown
- Architectural style: Gothic Revival
- Website: llenroc.org
- NRHP reference No.: 80002781
- Added to NRHP: April 16, 1980

Llenroc is a Gothic Revival villa built for Ezra Cornell, the founder of Cornell University. It is located at 100 Cornell Avenue in Ithaca, New York, just below the Cornell University campus. Since 1911, it has been the home of the Pi chapter of the Delta Phi fraternity. The house was added to the National Register of Historic Places in 1980.

== History ==
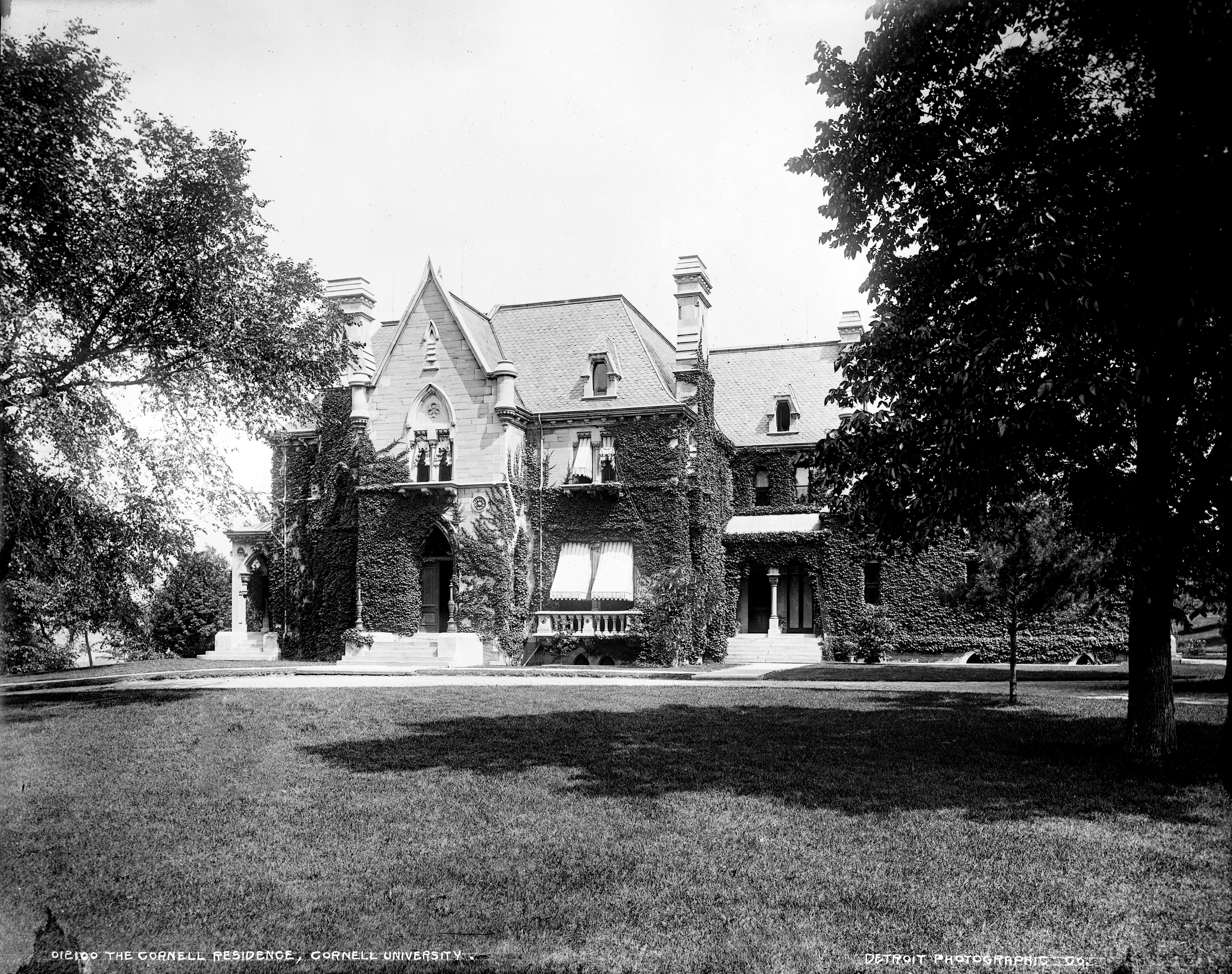
Llenroc, c. 1900

Llenroc ("Cornell" spelled backward) was designed in 1865 by the Albany firm Nichols & Brown, which had earlier designed Cascadilla Hall at Cornell University. Construction began in 1869 and was completed in 1876. It is a well-preserved example of masonry Gothic Revival architecture.

In January 1949, The Cornell Daily Sun reported, "With McGraw and Morrill Halls, this home represents Cornell as its founder first knew it."

The house is constructed of local "Llenroc" bluestone and limestone. Ezra Cornell employed numerous European artisans in its construction, including English woodcarvers and German stonemasons. Nine fireplaces were also imported from Europe and placed throughout the house. Robert Richardson, one of many craftsmen who came from England, was one of Llenroc’s primary stone carvers. He went on to work on the A.D. White House, Sage College, Sage Chapel, and Barnes Hall on the Cornell University campus. A.D. White, the first president of Cornell University, so admired the quality of Richardson’s work that he dubbed him Magister de vivis lapidibus, Latin for “teacher of living stone.”

Ezra Cornell died in 1874, as Llenroc neared completion. His wife and children lived there for 32 years, but vacated it in the early 20th century as it was too extravagant for their needs.

=== Construction ===
According to Cornell University Professor Kermit Parsons, Ezra Cornell's tastes were plain in most respects. and Llenroc was “his only architectural extravagance." Ezra’s son Alonzo Cornell, the Governor of New York from 1880 to 1882, wrote in his 1884 biography of Ezra Cornell that, "with his exceptional prosperity came the ambition to build a dwelling which should be an ornament to the locality.: In October 1906, Cornell University Professor Burt Wilder recalled, "Perhaps the best exemplification of the duality of his nature was offered by his indifference to the impression made by his rather shabby vehicle, horse, and even that, as contrasted with his genuine and superior artistic pleasure in the execution of carvings for his projected residence."

At A.D. White’s suggestion, "True and Firm: was carved on the stone riband above the house’s front door which Alonzo Cornell said represents the principal entrance and is characteristic of the building in all its detail.

=== Architecture ===
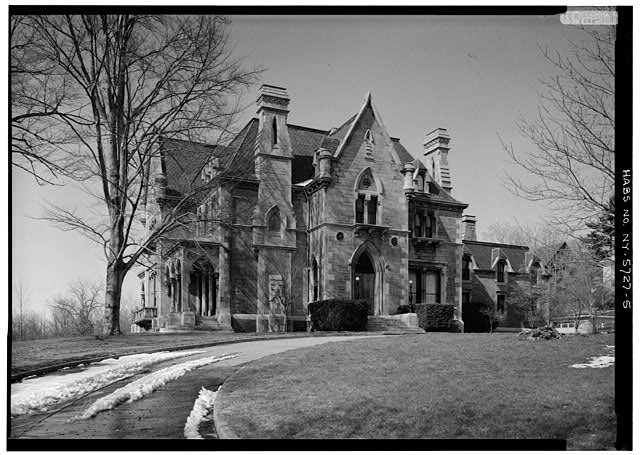
Llenroc

There are several notable aspects to the house and property. The house's stone exteriors feature three-foot thick masonry walls and a variety of carved capitals, arches, and turrets. Its interiors are decorated in Georgia Pine and black walnut, and include large leaded glass mirrors, fireplaces, molded plaster ceilings, and a pine balustrade main staircase carved in a Gothic style. Rare, hand-made twin chandeliers hang in the living and music rooms. The house contains nine elaborate fireplaces.

In 1925, the Smiley Baldwin Memorial Stairway was donated to the Delta Phi fraternity by Arthur Baldwin, Cornell Class of 1892. The outdoor Stairway, built in honor of Arthur's son Morgan Smiley Baldwin, Cornell Class of 1915, who was killed in World War I, connects Cornell Avenue and University Avenue and is located at the southwest corner of the property. Arthur Baldwin and Morgan Smiley Baldwin were both brothers of the chapter.

== Delta Phi and Llenroc ==
The Pi chapter of the Delta Phi fraternity was founded at Cornell University in 1891. After spending its first 10 years in rental houses, the chapter purchased 515 Stewart Avenue in 1901.

In 1911, the chapter purchased Llenroc from Ezra’s daughters Mary Emily Cornell and Emma Cornell Blair. White wrote the chapter a letter of congratulations, in which he stated, “The music of the University chimes comes down from the library tower upon the whole place morning, noon, and evening, as a benediction. I am glad to see a house so dear to me in the possession of so distinguished a fraternity as yours, and trust that the occupation of the place hallowed by so many cherished memories will bring a blessing on all who enter it.”

The house was added to the National Register of Historic Places in 1980. Llenroc is featured in many books about the University, Ezra Cornell, and Central New York State. It is the subject of a 1994 master’s thesis written by a graduate student in the Architecture College. It is lectured about in the Cornell University course Cornell: The First American University. Architect and chapter brother M. Arthur Gensler, Cornell Class of ‘58 and the founder of Gensler, the world’s largest architectural firm, called Llenroc “one of the great buildings in America.”

== See also ==
- North American fraternity and sorority housing
