= Sigma Phi =

American collegiate fraternity

- ΣΦ
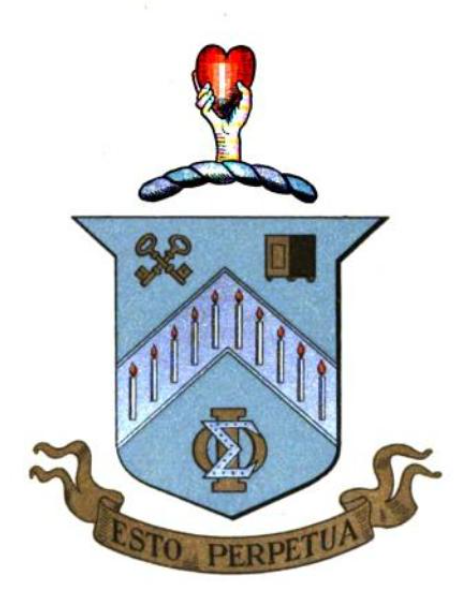
- Founded: March 4, 1827; 199 years ago Union College
- Type: Secret
- Affiliation: NIC
- Former affiliation: NIC
- Status: Active
- Scope: National
- Motto: Esto Perpetua "Let it be perpetual"
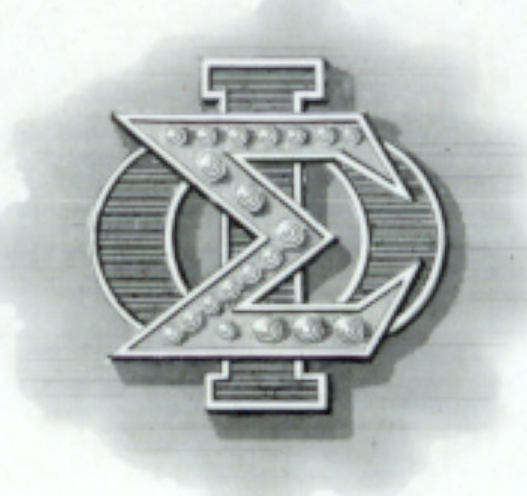
- Member badge
- Colors: Azure and Argent
- Publication: The Flame
- Chapters: 6
- Headquarters: P.O. Box 57417; Tucson, Arizona 85732-7417; United States
- Website: sigmaphi.org

Sigma Phi Society (ΣΦ) is an American college fraternity. Established in 1827 at Union College in Schenectady, New York, it was the second Greek letter fraternal organization founded in the United States. Sigma Phi was the first collegiate social fraternity to establish a chapter at another college, making it the first national fraternity. It was also a founding member of the National Interfraternity Conference, now the North American Interfraternity Conference. It is part of the Union Triad along with the Kappa Alpha society and Delta Phi.

== History ==
Sigma Phi Society was formed as a secret society on March 4, 1827, on the campus of Union College in Schenectady, New York. Its founders were Charles Thorn Cromwell, John Thomas Bowie, Thomas Fielder Bowie, and Thomas Sydenham Witherspoon. The Alpha chapter of Sigma Phi at Union College has been in continuous operation since its founding, making it the oldest continuously running fraternity chapter in the United States.

In 1831, Beta of New York was established at Hamilton College by John Cochrane, a student from Hamilton who had come to study at Union for one academic year and then returned to his home institution. In doing so, it made the Sigma Phi society the first Greek fraternal organization in the United States to establish a chapter at another college, thus becoming the first national Greek letter organization in the United States.

In 1834, Sigma Phi became the first fraternity to publish a catalogue of its membership. The fraternity was incorporated in the State of New York in 1885 and was reincorporated in 1920.

In 1901, Sigma Phi became a founding member of the National Interfraternity Conference, now the North American Interfraternity Conference.

Historically, the fraternity had been conservative in adding chapters. In 1963, the fraternity had eleven active chapters, two inactive chapters, and 3,910 living members.

Its headquarters is in Tucson, Arizona.

== Symbols ==
The practices and rituals of the Sigma Phi Society are relatively unknown due to its establishment, and continued consideration, as a secret society.

The Sigma Phi badge is a monogram with a jeweled Σ directly over a Φ that is either plain or chased. It was designed by Charles N. Rowley, founder of the Beta of New York chapter. In 1879, Baird's Manual of American College Fraternities stated that the badge was royal purple. Since 1879, the badge has been produced mainly in gold. Its pledge pin is a light blue and white button.

The society's colors are azure (light blue) and argent (white). Its motto is Esto Perpetua or "Let it be perpetual". Its publication is the Sigma Phi Flame, first published in 1920.

== Chapters ==
In the following list, active chapters are indicated in bold and inactive chapters are in italics.

Chapter	Letter	Charter date and range	Institution	Location	Status	Ref.
**Alpha of New York**	U	March 4, 1827	Union College	Schenectady, New York	Active	
Beta of New York	H	1831–2019	Hamilton College	Clinton, New York	Inactive	(Note: Attempted, with little success, to include women in the chapter's membership.)
Alpha of Massachusetts	W	1834–1968	Williams College	Williamstown, Massachusetts	Inactive	(Note: Chapter formed from Phi Alpha (local), established in 1833.)
Gamma of New York	N	March 4, 1836–March 4, 1848	New York University	New York City, New York	Inactive	(Note: According to the Baird's Manual (1963), the chapter closed "in a belief that a successful chapter could not be maintained in a city college where the students met only at recitations".)
**Delta of New York**	G	August 4, 1840	Hobart College	Geneva, New York	Active	
**Alpha of Vermont**	V	March 4, 1845	University of Vermont	Burlington, Vermont	Active	
Alpha of New Jersey	P	1853–1858	Princeton University	Princeton, New Jersey	Inactive	(Note: Charter returned to the Convention of 1860 after the college banned fraternities.)
Alpha of Michigan	M	1858–2022	University of Michigan	Ann Arbor, Michigan	Inactive	(Note: Charter revoked.)
Alpha of Pennsylvania	L	February 4, 1887 – 2002	Lehigh University	Bethlehem, Pennsylvania	Inactive	(Note: Chapter formed from Delta Tau Delta (local), established in 1870.)
**Epsilon of New York**	C	October 4, 1890	Cornell University	Ithaca, New York	Suspended	
**Alpha of Wisconsin**	F	October 31, 1908	University of Wisconsin–Madison	Madison, Wisconsin	Active	
**Alpha of California**	I	September 7, 1912	University of California, Berkeley	Berkeley, California	Active	(Note: Chapter formed from the La Junta Club (local), established in 1901.)
**Alpha of Virginia**	S	1953	University of Virginia	Charlottesville, Virginia	Active	(Note: Chapter formed from the Serpentine Club (local), established in 1890 and later called Delta Tau Delta. .)
Alpha of North Carolina	T	2008–2019	University of North Carolina at Chapel Hill	Chapel Hill, North Carolina	Inactive	

=== Notes ===
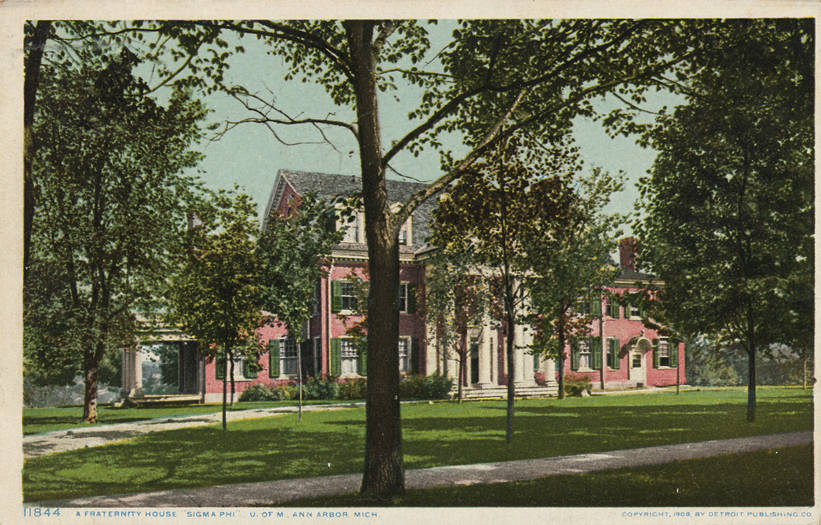
Sigma Phi house at the University of Michigan, circa 1900 (now an inactive chapter, house no longer occupied by Sigma Phi)

== Chapter houses ==
Alpha of Massachusetts at Williams College was the first chapter to build its own chapter house. Today, some chapters own buildings on the National Register of Historic Places, such as the Thorsen House, owned by the Alpha of California chapter in Berkeley and designed by Greene and Greene. The Alpha of Wisconsin chapter house is the Harold C. Bradley House, a National Historic Landmark designed in 1908 by Louis Sullivan.

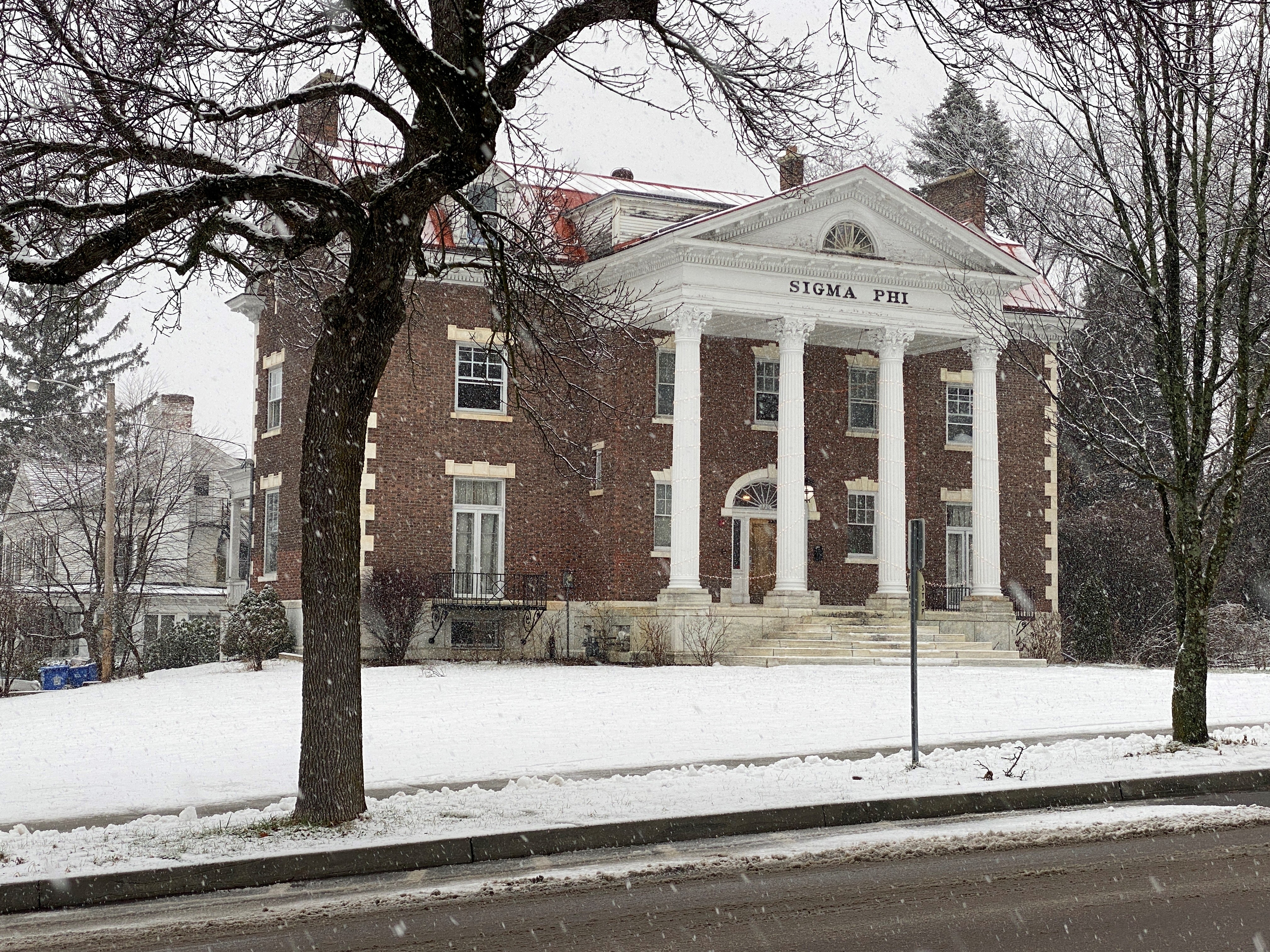
Sigma Phi Place, University of Vermont, 2022

=== Alpha of Vermont ===
The Alpha of Vermont chapter house, known as Sigma Phi Place, is a listed contributing building to the National Register of Historic Places' University Green Historic District. It was designed in 1903 by architect Marcus T. Reynolds of Albany, New York, who was a member of the Alpha of Massachusetts chapter. Located at 420 College Street, Sigma Phi Place was the first purpose-built fraternity house at the University of Vermont. It is a three-story, Colonial Revival style brick house. Its main entrance has a gable pedimented portico with four columns that have Corinthian capitals.

== Governance ==
Sigma Phi is governed by officers who are elected at an annual convention of chapter delegates. Until 1887, the annual conventions were held in Schnectady, New York, on March 4, the date of the first initiation ceremony.

Its national headquarters is in Tucson, Arizona.

== See also ==
- List of social fraternities and sororities
- Triad (fraternities)
