= New Holland Brewing Company =

American craft beer company

Coordinates: 42°48′15.39″N 86°7′36.3″W

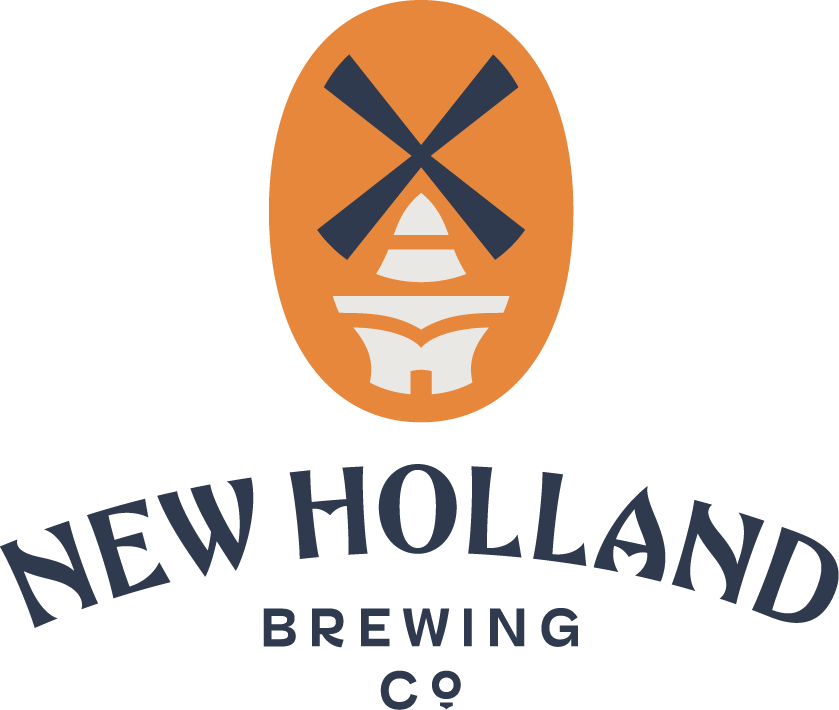
- Company logo
- Location: Holland, Michigan
- Opened: 1997
- Key people: Brett VanderKamp; David White
- Annual production volume: ca. 50,000 US beer barrels (59,000 hL) (2020)
- Other products: Beer, Spirits, Canned Cocktails, Alternate Beverages; Restaurants and Tasting Rooms
- Employees: 201-500
- Website: newhollandbrew.com dragonsmilk.com

Active beers
Name	Type
Dragon's Milk	Bourbon Barrel-Aged Stout
Dragon's Milk: Tales of Gold	Bourbon Barrel-Aged Golden Ale
Dragon's Milk: Crimson Keep	Bourbon Barrel-Aged Red Ale
Dragon's Milk Reserve	Bourbon Barrel-Aged Pastry Stout
Tangerine Space Machine	Hazy/Juicy India Pale Ale
Lightpoint	Functional White Ale
The Poet	Oatmeal Stout
Hazy River	New England–Style India Pale Ale

Seasonal beers
Name	Type
Dragons Milk: Triple Mash	Bourbon Barrel-Aged Stout
Full Circle	Kolsch
Ichabod	Pumpkin Ale
Cabin Fever	Brown Ale
Variety Packs	Summer/Winter

New Holland Brewing Company is an American independent craft brewing and distilling company headquartered in Holland, Michigan. It also owns and operates brewpub-style restaurants and spirits-tasting rooms located across West Michigan. The company's craft-style beer brands Dragon's Milk, Tangerine Space Machine, and spirits brands Dragon's Milk Origin, Beer Barrel Bourbon among others, are distributed throughout the United States and exported to Canada, Europe and Asia.

After the sale of Bell's to Kirin, New Holland Brewing Company became the largest craft brewery in the state of Michigan.

== History ==
Brett VanderKamp and Jason Spaulding, the founders of New Holland Brewing Company, grew up together in Midland, Michigan, and later attended Hope College. In college Spaulding and VanderKamp cultivated a love of homebrewing, which would bring them together again shortly after graduation. Their business plan took two years to formulate, but once complete, the pair quickly lined up investors, and in 1997 New Holland was founded in Holland, Michigan.

Originally, their goal was to produce beer that was characteristically unique to Western Michigan. Their beer was well received, and the company increased production to just over 5,000 US beer barrels (590,000 L) in 2006. In 2007, the company increased production to over 7,500 US bbl (880,000 L).

New Holland began distilling bourbon, whiskey, rum, gin and vodka in 2005, and selling it in 2008.

On August 23, 2018, New Holland Brewing Company announced that it will be re-branding its flagship Dragon's Milk Bourbon Barrel-Aged Stout. The company launched the re-branding Dragon's Milk packaging in 2023 alongside new Dragon's Milk items, Dragon's Milk Crimson Keep BA Imperial Red Ale and Dragon's Milk Tales of Gold BA Imperial Golden Ale.
