= Kappa Alpha Society =

North American collegiate fraternity

- ΚΑ
- Founded: November 26, 1825; 200 years ago Union College
- Type: Social
- Affiliation: NIC
- Status: Active
- Scope: North America
- Colors: Scarlet
- Symbol: Kappa Alpha Key
- Flower: Carnation
- Chapters: 15 (5 active)
- Headquarters: PO Box 876; Ithaca, New York; United States
- Website: ka.org

The Kappa Alpha Society (ΚΑ) is a North American social college fraternity. Founded in 1825, it was the progenitor of the modern fraternity system in North America. It is considered to be the oldest continuously active national, secret, Greek-letter social fraternity and was the first of the fraternities which would eventually become known as the Union Triad (along with Sigma Phi and Delta Phi) that pioneered the North American system of social fraternities.

While several fraternities claim to be the oldest, Baird's Manual states that ΚΑ has maintained a continuous existence since its foundation, making it the oldest undergraduate fraternity that exists today. As of 2026, there are five active chapters, three in the United States and two in Canada.

This organization is not to be confused with the Kappa Alpha Order, a completely separate national fraternity founded in 1865.

== History ==
In 1823, John Hart Hunter, Isaac Wilber Jackson, and Thomas Hun, who were students at Union College in Schenectady, New York, established an informal group called The Philosophers. That group became the Kappa Alpha Society on November 26, 1825. Besides those listed above, its founders were Joseph Anthony Constant, John McGeoch, Orlando Meads, and James Proudfit of the class of 1826, and Arthur Burtis and Joseph Law of the class of 1827.

The Kappa Alpha Society represents the middle link between secret societies, literary societies, and Greek-letter organizations like Phi Beta Kappa. In the words of founding member Arthur Burtis:

After we were domiciled in our upper chamber, in the fourth story of the south section---South College---northeast corner... we now and then beguiled the long winter evenings and entertained our friends with a few baked potatoes and salt and comforted them with apples. Jackson, Hun, Meads, Constant, and McGeoch were often the genial sharers of our simple meal, which was enlivened with mirth and wit and merry song... It was determined to raise Hunter to an elevated seat on the woodpile, which stood in the corner of the room. When he was exalted to his high eminence, with his pipe in his mouth, he became the leader of this little band. Whereupon I suggested it would be right for us to get our light from this central luminary and that I would carry it to the others... This band was now beginning to assume shape and form and comely order.

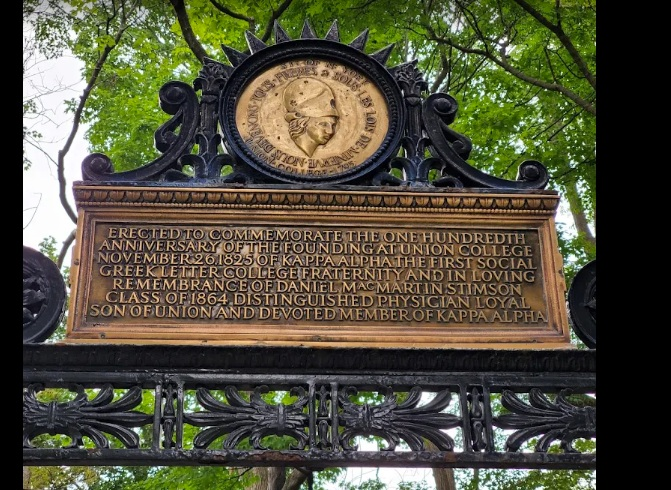
Plaque that hangs over a gate at Union College which commemorates the 100th Anniversary of the founding of the Kappa Alpha Society in November 1825.

On June 23, 1827, the society decided to adopted a membership emblem which takes the form of a medal.

Kappa Alpha unsuccessfully attempted to expand to Hamilton College in fall 1830. That same year, they published their first catalog. KA later successfully expanded to Williams College in 1833, led by Azariah S. Clark of the class of 1834. Clark and Alexander Hyde had traveled to Union College to obtain a charter for Phi Beta Kappa, and instead returned with one for Kappa Alpha.

In 1925, a gate was dedicated at Union College's Jackson Gardens, named after Kappa Alpha co-founder Isaac W. Jackson, Class of 1826, to commemorate the fraternity's 100th anniversary.

In 2000, the fraternity agreed to restore the Kappa Alpha gate at Union College.

In September 2025, the 200th anniversary of the fraternity was celebrated at Union College in New York.

== Chapters ==
Following is a list of the active and inactive chapters of the Kappa Alpha Society, with active chapters indicated in bold and inactive chapters in italics. Chapters are designated with an abbreviation of the institution's Latin name.

Chapter	Letters	Charter date and range	Institution	Location	Status	Ref.
**New York Alpha**	CC	November 26, 1825 – 2003; 2011	Union College	Schenectady, New York	Active	(Note: The Union chapter was co-ed from 1991 until 2003.)
Massachusetts Alpha	CG	October 29, 1833 – 1983	Williams College	Williamstown, Massachusetts	Inactive	(Note: In 1968, the Williams College Trustees, with the support of the faculty, voted to bar fraternity participation by students. Some chapters operated despite the ban for a time, with Kappa Alpha ceasing operations in 1983.)
**New York Beta**	CH	November 26, 1844 – 1854; 1879–2003; 2005	Hobart College	Geneva, New York	Active	(Note: New York Beta chapter originated with a local fraternity called Skin & Bones formed in 1842.)
New Jersey Alpha	CNC	October 21, 1852 – 1855; 1983–1998	Princeton University	Princeton, New Jersey	Inactive	
Virginia Alpha	VV	January 8, 1857 – 1861	University of Virginia	Charlottesville, Virginia	Inactive	
New York Gamma	VC	November 12, 1868 – 1990; 2007–2018	Cornell University	Ithaca, New York	Inactive	
**Ontario Alpha**	VT	February 19, 1892	University of Toronto	Toronto, Ontario	Active	
Pennsylvania Alpha	VL	January 2, 1894 – 2018	Lehigh University	Bethlehem, Pennsylvania	Inactive	
Quebec Alpha	VM	April 21, 1899 – 1971; 1987–2006; 2012–2022	McGill University	Montreal, Quebec	Inactive	
**Pennsylvania Beta**	VP	April 26, 1913	University of Pennsylvania	Philadelphia, Pennsylvania	Active	(Note: Pennsylvania Beta chapter originated with a local fraternity called the Terwood Society formed in 1909.)
**Ontario Beta**	VOO	February 14, 1948	University of Western Ontario	London, Ontario	Active	(Note: Ontario Beta chapter is unrecognized by its university, a common occurrence in Canada, where most chapters operate fully independently from their institutions.)
Connecticut Alpha	VW	March 18, 1967 – 1993; 1994–1997	Wesleyan University	Middletown, Connecticut	Inactive	(Note: Connecticut Alpha chapter originated with a local fraternity called Delta Sigma formed in 1952. This local group was co-educational. The chapter was also co-ed at various times.)
Alberta Alpha	VA	November 5, 1988 – 2011	University of Alberta	Edmonton, Alberta	Inactive	
Alberta Beta	VAC	November 23, 1991 – 1999	University of Calgary	Calgary, Alberta	Inactive	
Nova Scotia Alpha	VD	November 21, 2009 – 2022	Dalhousie University	Halifax, Nova Scotia	Inactive	

== Membership ==
The Kappa Alpha Society has produced a substantial number of notable members in widely varied fields throughout its 200-year history.

A catolog of members was published in 1892 and published under the name Kappa Alpha Record in 1925 and 1941.

The Union and Wesleyan chapters were co-educational, that is, having male and female members in the recent past. There are currently no co-educational chapters.

== See also ==
- List of social fraternities and sororities
- Triad (fraternities)
