= Delta Phi =

American collegiate fraternity

- ΔΦ
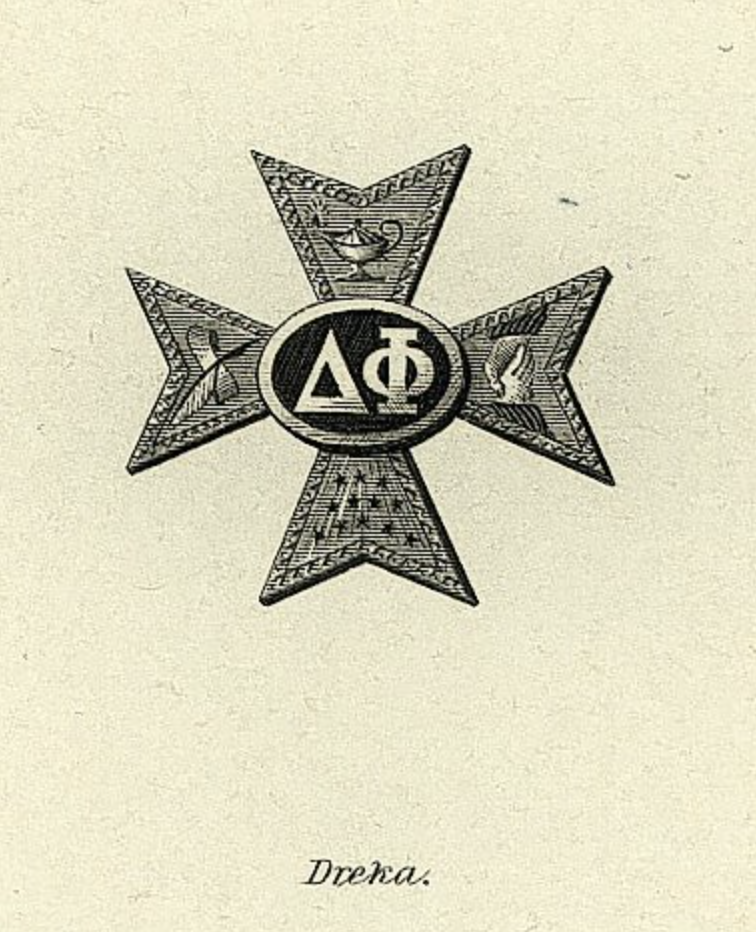
- Founded: November 17, 1827; 198 years ago Union College
- Type: Social
- Affiliation: NIC
- Status: Active
- Scope: National
- Motto: Semper Ubique "Always Everywhere"
- Colors: Columbia blue and White
- Symbol: Maltese Cross
- Patron saint: St. Elmo
- Chapters: 8 active
- Nickname: St. Elmo, St. Elmo Hall, Elmo
- Headquarters: 120 Providence Road, Suite 102; P.O. Box 4633; Chapel Hill, North Carolina 27514; United States
- Website: www.deltaphi.org

Delta Phi (ΔΦ) is a fraternal society established in Schenectady, New York, on November 17, 1827. Its first chapter was founded at Union College, and was the third and final member of the Union Triad. In 1879, William Raimond Baird's American College Fraternities characterized the fraternity's membership as being largely drawn from the old Knickerbocker families of New York and New Jersey.

As of 2024, the fraternity has ten active chapters on the East Coast of the United States. It also uses the names "St. Elmo," "St. Elmo Hall," and "Elmo" in reference to its relation to Erasmus of Formia, the patron saint of sailors, and the Knights of Malta.

== History ==
Delta Phi was founded on November 17, 1827, at Union College by nine upperclassmen. Its founders were:

- Benjamin Burroughs, Presbyterian minister from Savannah, Georgia
- William Hun Fondey, attorney from Albany, New York
- Samuel Lewis Lamberson, Presbyterian minister from Jamaica, New York
- Samuel C. Lawrison, United States Navy surgeon from Pensacola, Florida
- David Hervey Little, New York Supreme Court Justice from Rochester, New York
- John Mason, clergyman from Jamaica, New York
- Joseph Griffiths Masten, Mayor of Buffalo, New York
- Thomas Clark McLaury, clergyman from Lisbon, New York
- William Wilson, President of the College of Cincinnati from Ireland

Delta Phi and the other Union Triad fraternities were established during a time of strong Anti-Masonry sentiment in the United States and became targets of the Anti-Masonry movement. This led Phi Beta Kappa, the original fraternity, to abandon secrecy and become a strictly honor society.

In the early 1830s, Dr. Eliphalet Nott, president of Union College, called for the dissolution of all fraternities. Before this policy could be enacted, John Jay Hyde, a member of Delta Phi, argued the benefits of the fraternity system so convincingly that Dr. Nott relented and permitted the organizations to remain in existence. Hyde went on to design the badge still worn by members of Delta Phi today.

This connection to the Knights of Malta led Delta Phi to become known as "St. Elmo", a name first used by the Omicron chapter at Yale University, which since has transformed into a senior secret society known as St. Elmo Society that is no longer associated with Delta Phi. Beginning at some point shortly after the Omicron chapter's inception in 1889, the brothers there used the name of St. Elmo, the patron saint of mariners and the Knights of Malta. On some campuses, Delta Phi chapters are known almost exclusively as "St. Elmo," "St. Elmo Hall," or simply "Elmo." At Cornell University, the Delta Phi chapter is known as Llenroc, since that was the name of the mansion when it was the residence of Cornell University co-founder Ezra Cornell.

In 1838, the Beta chapter of Delta Phi was founded at Brown University and Delta Phi finally became a "national" fraternity. The Gamma chapter was established at New York University in 1841, followed by the Delta chapter at Columbia University in 1842, the Epsilon chapter at Rutgers University in New Brunswick, New Jersey in 1845, the Zeta chapter at Harvard University in 1845, which was reorganized in 1901 as the Delphic Club, one of Harvard's prestigious Final Clubs, and the Eta chapter at the University of Pennsylvania in Philadelphia in 1849.

In 1844, Delta Phi held its first convention, only the second fraternity to have such a meeting and was held under the auspices of the Alpha chapter in Troy, New York. In 1847, it held its second convention in New York City and, seeing the growth in the organization, authorized the fraternity to undertake its first printed publication, a complete catalogue of the membership up to 1847. Delta Phi left its base in the Northeast and expanded into what was then still the northwest of the young country, establishing the Iota chapter at University of Michigan in 1855 and the Kappa chapter at the University of North Carolina at Chapel Hill later the same year.

Delta Phi remains a small fraternity with twelve active chapters and few chapters with more than a couple dozen members. It has resisted expansion in order to create an "intimate, personal experience" for its members. The fraternity's current expansion policy is to reactivate dormant chapters. As a member of the Union Triad, Delta Phi is the third oldest fraternity in the United States.

A Delta Phi badge

== Symbols ==
Delta Phi's mott is Semper Ubique or "Always Everywhere". Its badge includes a Maltese Cross, a symbol used by the Knights of Malta.

The fraternity's colors are Columbia blue and white. Its nicknames are St. Elmo, St. Elmo Hall, and Elmo in reference to its relation to Erasmus of Formia, the patron saint of sailors, and the Knights of Malta.

== Chapters ==
These are the chapters of Delta Phi, with active chapters indicated in bold and inactive chapters in italics.

Chapter	Charter date and range	Institution	Location	Status	Ref.
Alpha	November 17, 1827 – 1999	Union College	Schenectady, New York	Inactive	
**Beta**	1838–1856, 1868–1877, 1881–1966, 1983–2011	Brown University	Providence, Rhode Island	Withdrew (local)	(Note: At its 1966 reorganization, the Beta chapter was created from Delta Phi Omega (local). This chapter disaffiliated from the national fraternity but remains active under the name of Delta Phi (local) and continues to use the fraternity's crest.)
Gamma	1841–2019	New York University	New York City, New York	Inactive	
Delta	1842–2001	Columbia University	New York City, New York	Inactive	
**Epsilon**	1845–1999, 2003	Rutgers University–New Brunswick	New Brunswick, New Jersey	Active	
Zeta	1845–1848, 1885–1901	Harvard University	Cambridge, Massachusetts	Withdrew (local)	(Note: This chapter withdrew and became the Delphic Club.)
**Eta**	1849–1871, 1882	University of Pennsylvania	Philadelphia, Pennsylvania	Active	(Note: Chapter was revived in 1882 by absorbing Delta Beta Phi (local), which had formed in 1878. It went coed in 1979.)
Theta	1854–1877	Princeton University	Princeton, New Jersey	Inactive	
Iota	1855–1874, 1923–1936	University of Michigan	Ann Arbor, Michigan	Inactive	(Note: Iota chapter was revived in 1923 by absorbing Kappa Beta Psi (local), established in 1912.)
Kappa	1856–1861	University of North Carolina	Chapel Hill, North Carolina	Inactive	
**Lambda**	1864	Rensselaer Polytechnic Institute	Troy, New York	Active	
Mu	1874–1876	Colgate University	Hamilton, New York	Inactive	
Nu	1884–2015	Lehigh University	Bethlehem, Pennsylvania	Inactive	(Note: Chapter formed from Alpha Gamma Phi (local).)
**Xi**	1885–1916, 1921	Johns Hopkins University	Baltimore, Maryland	Active	(Note: Chapter was revived in 1921 by absorbing Beta Beta (local).)
Omicron	1889–1925	Yale University	New Haven, Connecticut	Withdrew (local)	(Note: Omicron chapter dissociated with Delta Phi and is now known as the St. Elmo Society (local).)
**Pi**	1891–2018, 2022	Cornell University	Ithaca, New York	Active	
**Rho**	1908	University of Virginia	Charlottesville, Virginia	Active	
Sigma	1917–1965, 1982–2001	Trinity College	Hartford, Connecticut	Inactive	(Note: Chapter formed from Iota Kappa Lambda (local), established in 1829.)
Tau	1920–2009	University of Illinois Urbana-Champaign	Champaign, Illinois	Inactive	(Note: Chapter formed from the Iris Club (local), established in 1908.)
Upsilon	1926–1965	Williams College	Williamstown, Massachusetts	Inactive	(Note: Chapter formed from Alpha Tau Alpha (local), established in 1925. Williams College banned all fraternities in the 1960s, phasing them out by 1970.)
Phi	1940–2020	Kenyon College	Gambier, Ohio	Withdrew (local)	(Note: Chapter formed from Alpha Pi Tau (local), established in 1927. The chapter withdrew from the fraternity in 2020 to become a local fraternity.)
Chi	1950–2021	Hamilton College	Clinton, New York	Inactive	(Note: Chapter formed from Alpha Chi (local), established in 1947.)
**Psi**	1960–1974, 1986–2007, 2015	Pennsylvania State University	State College, Pennsylvania	Active	(Note: Chapter formed from the Beaver Society (local), established in 1935.)
**Omega**	1968–2020, 2026	University of Pittsburgh	Pittsburgh, Pennsylvania	Active	(Note: Chapter formed from Lambda Sigma Rho (local), established in 1965.)
Omega Alpha	1987–2024	College of William and Mary	Williamsburg, Virginia	Inactive	(Note: In March 2020, William & Mary suspended the chapter through the spring 2028 semester for violations of hazing and alcohol policies. However, the fraternity did not withdraw the chapter's charter, allowing the group to continue as an unofficial student organization.)
Omega Beta	1994–2001	Wabash College	Crawfordsville, Indiana	Inactive	

== Activities ==
Overall alumni participation among active chapters remains strong, with chapters hosting several social events throughout the year.

On or around November 17 of every year, the national organization sponsors the Founder's Day Dinner at the Saint Elmo Club where undergraduates and alumni celebrate the founding of the fraternity.

== Governance and organization ==
Owing mostly to its development in the early 19th century, Delta Phi organizes itself federally. Individual alumni chapters still exercise significant power over chapter governance. Those powers that are given in the national organization are vested in the Board of Governors. The board consists of one member appointed from each alumni chapter. Among the duties given to the board is hiring the executive director who oversees day-to-day management of the fraternity.

In addition to the national governing organization of the fraternity, Delta Phi alumni have also established the Saint Elmo Foundation which, among other things, sponsors the annual leadership weekend and provides scholarships to undergraduate members of Delta Phi.

== See also ==
- List of social fraternities
