= List of Alpha Gamma Delta members =

Alpha Gamma Delta is an international women's fraternity and social organization. It was founded on May 30, 1904, by eleven female students at Syracuse University in Syracuse, New York. Following are some of its notable members.

== Academia and education ==
- Maruta Gardner (Beta Zeta) – teacher, principal, and assistant superintendent of schools in San Diego County, California
- Kelly M. Miller (Zeta Kappa) – first female president of Texas A&M University–Corpus Christi

== Art and architecture ==
- Jeanne Gang – (Sigma) – architect
- Emily Helen Butterfield (Alpha) – Michigan's first licensed female architect, artist, Women's Movement pioneer
- Clyde Connell (Mu) – artist
- Lillian Sarafinchan – painter and art director

== Business ==
- Jani Macari Pallis (Gamma Phi) – founder of Cislunar Aerospace
- Beth Ford (Rho) – CEO of Land O'Lakes

== Entertainment ==
- Fran Allison (Pi) – radio and television personality (Kukla, Fran and Ollie)
- Andrea Canning (Zeta Chi) – TV anchor, journalist (Dateline, Weekend Today)
- Rita Coolidge (Gamma Beta) – Grammy Award-winning singer/songwriter
- Ashley Durham (Gamma Zeta) – model; Miss Tennessee USA 2011; Miss USA 1st runner-up 2011
- Wynn Everett (Gamma Delta) – actress, known as Whitney Frost on Agent Carter
- Donna Fargo (Gamma Eta) – Grammy Award-winning singer/songwriter
- Marcelle LeBlanc (Gamma Delta) – Miss America's Outstanding Teen 2022 and actress
- Gloria Loring (Delta Alpha) – singer/songwriter, author, actress, national spokesperson for the JDRF
- Amber Mariano (Alpha Epsilon) – television personality and winner of Survivor: All-Stars
- Karen McCullah (Gamma Mu) – screenwriter (10 Things I Hate About You, Legally Blonde, The House Bunny)
- Dorothy Provine (Iota) – actress (The Alaskans, Sugarfoot, The 30 Foot Bride of Candy Rock)
- Jeanne Robertson (Gamma Delta) – comedian, Miss North Carolina 1963
- Karen Staley (Alpha Omicron) – country music singer/songwriter
- Kate Steinberg (Beta Iota) – internet personality, television personality, and former NHL cheerleader
- Abbie Stockard (Gamma Delta) – Miss America, 2025
- Barbara Jo Walker (Gamma Zeta) – Miss America, 1947

== Literature ==
- Kathleen Barber (Sigma) – novelist
- Elizabeth Frances Corbett (Beta) – poet and writer
- Mignon G. Eberhart (Beta Alpha) – mystery writer proclaimed as “America’s Agatha Christie”
- Deborah Kolodji (Delta Alpha) – American haiku poet.
- Donna Lewis Friess (Delta Alpha) – author, college professor, activist
- Agnes Newton Keith (Omicron) – author, Japanese POW/civilian internment camp survivor
- Heather MacAllister (Epsilon Eta) – novelist
- Samara O'Shea (Alpha Omega) – author (Love of Letters: A 21st-Century Guide to the Art of Letter Writing, Note to Self: On Keeping a Journal and Other Dangerous Pursuits)
- Gail Saltz (Zeta Beta) – psychiatrist and author

== Military ==
- Alicia Tate-Nadeau (Epsilon Omicron) – director of the Illinois Emergency Management Agency

== Politics ==
- Carolyn Bennett (Tau) – member of Parliament of Canada
- Beth Chapman (Gamma Upsilon) – former Secretary of State of Alabama
- Kerry-Lynne Findlay (Delta Zeta) – former member of Canadian House of Commons and Minister of National Revenue
- Jennie M. Forehand (Gamma Epsilon) – former Maryland Senate
- Kay Ivey (Gamma Delta) – Governor of Alabama and former Alabama State Treasurer
- Mildred Jeffrey (Delta) – political activist and organizer
- Sharon Johnston – 55th viceregal consort of Canada
- Kelly Loeffler (Sigma) – former United States Senate (R-GA)
- Dee Long (Lambda) – former Speaker of the Minnesota House of Representatives
- Elaine Marshall (Alpha Xi) – North Carolina Secretary of State
- Marian Price (Beta Alpha) – former Nebraska Senate
- Judy Baar Topinka (Lambda) – former Illinois Comptroller and Illinois Treasurer

== Science ==
- Jane Hamilton Hall – physicist with the Manhattan Project and assistant director of the Los Alamos National Laboratory, secretary of the General Advisory Committee of the Atomic Energy Commission
- Madge Macklin – physician known for her work in the field of medical genetics

== Sports ==
- Cheyenne Knight (Psi) – professional golfer
- Maria Maunder (Zeta Chi) – 1996 Summer Olympics women's rower
- Teri McKeever (Delta Alpha) – 2012 Summer Olympics women's swim team coach
- Jo Ann Washam (Delta Beta) – professional golfer

== Other ==
- Edith MacConnel Hickok (Alpha) – Alpha Gamma Delta founder

== Fictional members ==
- Blanche Devereaux – fictional character from The Golden Girls television series

== See also ==
- List of Alpha Gamma Delta chapters
