= List of Alpha Gamma Delta chapters =

Alpha Gamma Delta is an international women's fraternity, founded on May 30, 1904, at Syracuse University. It has installed approximately 200 collegiate chapters and 250 alumnae chapters across the United States and Canada.

== Collegiate chapters ==
Alpha Gamma Delta's collegiate chapters are named by geographical region. Northeastern chapter designations begin with Alpha, Lambda, or Zeta. Midwest designations begin with Beta, and West Coast chapters begin with Delta. Mid-South chapters begin with Epsilon or Kappa, while most Southern chapters are designated as Gamma, Nu, or Theta.

Following is a list of Alpha Gamma Delta's collegiate chapters in charter order, with active chapters indicated in bold and inactive chapters and institutions in italics.

Chapter	Charter date and range	Institution	Location	Region	Status	Ref.
**Alpha**	May 30, 1904 – December 1, 2001; November 20, 2010	Syracuse University	Syracuse, New York	Northeastern	Active	
Beta	June 16, 1905 – July 1, 1987	University of Wisconsin–Madison	Madison, Wisconsin	Midwest	Inactive	
Gamma	January 12, 1906 – January 1, 1912	Wesleyan University	Middletown, Connecticut	Northeastern	Inactive	(Note: Chapter was created from Zeta Epsilon (local), established in 1894.)
**Delta**	February 14, 1908	University of Minnesota	Minneapolis, Minnesota	Midwest	Active	
**Epsilon**	May 14, 1908	University of Kentucky	Lexington, Kentucky	Mid-South	Active	
**Zeta**	June 2, 1908	Ohio University	Athens, Ohio	Northeastern	Active	(Note: Chapter was created from Alpha Alpha Alpha (local), established in 1904.)
Eta	June 8, 1908 – 1919; 1924 – April 9, 1993	DePauw University	Greencastle, Indiana	Midwest	Inactive	(Note: Chapter was re-established in 1924 by absorbing Phi Sigma Delta (local).)
Theta	October 10, 1908 – August 7, 1950	Goucher College	Towson, Maryland	Northeastern	Inactive	
**Iota**	March 12, 1909	University of Washington	Seattle, Washington	West Coast	Active	(Note: Chapter was created from Theta Phi (local), established in 1908.)
Kappa	February 24, 1912 – May 30, 1996	Allegheny College	Meadville, Pennsylvania	Northeastern	Inactive	(Note: Chapter was created from Theta Sigma (local), established in 1904.)
Lambda	February 22, 1913 – May 1, 1995	Northwestern University	Evanston, Illinois	Midwest	Inactive	(Note: Chapter was created from the Crescent Club (local), established in 1912.)
**Mu**	May 2, 1913	Brenau University	Gainesville, Georgia	Southern	Active	(Note: Chapter was created from Nu Sigma (local), established in 1910.)
Nu	September 20, 1913 – September 9, 1961	Boston University	Boston, Massachusetts	Northeastern	Inactive	(Note: Chapter was created from Lambda Kappa (local), established in 1902.)
**Xi**	August 13, 1914	Illinois Wesleyan University	Bloomington, Illinois	Midwest	Active	(Note: Chapter was created from Pi Delta Phi (local), established in 1912.)
Omicron	March 12, 1915 – 1970; 197x ? – November 5, 1999	University of California, Berkeley	Berkeley, California	West Coast	Inactive	(Note: Chapter was created from The Cranford Club (local), established in 1908.)
**Pi**	June 5, 1917 – June 30, 1964; May 3, 2015	Coe College	Cedar Rapids, Iowa	Midwest	Active	(Note: Chapter was created from Gamma Theta Pi (local), established in 1915.)
**Rho**	September 8, 1917	Iowa State University	Ames, Iowa	Midwest	Active	(Note: Chapter was created from The Latoka Club (local), established in 1912.)
**Sigma**	June 12, 1918	University of Illinois Urbana-Champaign	Champaign, Illinois	Midwest	Active	(Note: Chapter was created from Delta Epsilon Phi (local), established in February 1917 to be a colony of Alpha Gamma Delta.)
**Tau**	March 7, 1919	University of Toronto	Toronto, Ontario, Canada	Northeastern	Active	(Note: Chapter was organized in 1914 as the Lambda chapter of Beta Delta Pi, a regional sorority. Lambda moved to the national Alpha Gamma Delta in 1919.)
**Upsilon**	May 2, 1919 – 1936; 1946	University of Oklahoma	Norman, Oklahoma	Mid-South	Active	(Note: Chapter was created from Alpha Delta (local), established in 1918.)
**Phi**	May 21, 1921 – 1980; 1981	Oregon State University	Corvallis, Oregon	West Coast	Active	(Note: Chapter was created from Delta Nu (local), established in 1919.)
Chi	October 1, 1921 – December 1, 2001	Michigan State University	East Lansing, Michigan	Northeastern	Inactive	(Note: Chapter was created from Chi Lambda (local), established in 1921)
**Psi**	November 18, 1921	University of Alabama	Tuscaloosa, Alabama	Southern	Active	
**Omega**	March 24, 1922	University of Akron	Akron, Ohio	Northeastern	Active	
Epsilon Alpha	April 7, 1922 – 1975; 1981 – April 9, 1993	University of Missouri	Columbia, Missouri	Mid-South	Inactive	(Note: Chapter was created from the Tuesday Study Club (local), established in 1921.)
Epsilon Beta	June 1, 1922 – 1937; February 15, 1965 – August 21, 2017	University of Kansas	Lawrence, Kansas	Mid-South	Inactive	(Note: Chapter was created from Gamma Sigma (local), established in 1920.)
**Alpha Alpha**	August 4, 1922 – 1972; 1994	University at Buffalo	Buffalo, New York	Northeastern	Active	(Note: Chapter was created from Alpha Nu (local), established in 1921.)
**Alpha Beta**	December 1, 1922	University of Michigan	Ann Arbor, Michigan	Northeastern	Active	(Note: Chapter was created from Alpha Kappa (local), established in 1922.)
Delta Alpha	January 13, 1923 – November 1, 1986; January 26, 2014 – 2020}	University of Southern California	Los Angeles, California	West Coast	Inactive	
**Gamma Alpha**	May 29, 1923	University of Georgia	Athens, Georgia	Southern	Active	
**Delta Beta**	June 8, 1923	Washington State University	Pullman, Washington	West Coast	Active	(Note: Chapter was created from the Mitra Club (local), established in 1919.)
Alpha Gamma	September 14, 1923 – July 1, 1971	University of Cincinnati	Cincinnati, Ohio	Northeastern	Inactive	(Note: Chapter was created from Delta Sigma (local), established in 1919.)
Delta Gamma	March 14, 1924 – June 7, 2022	Montana State University	Bozeman, Montana	West Coast	Inactive	(Note: Chapter was created from Zeta Kappa (local), established in 1924.)
Alpha Delta	May 30, 1924 – April 1, 1984	Ohio Wesleyan University	Delaware, Ohio	Northeastern	Inactive	(Note: Chapter was created from Alpha Beta Phi (local), established in 1922.)
Delta Delta	November 24, 1924 – June 30, 1969	University of Oregon	Eugene, Oregon	West Coast	Inactive	(Note: Chapter was created from Delta Omega (local), established in 1923.)
Delta Epsilon	1925 – 1982; 2014–2023	University of California, Los Angeles	Los Angeles, California	West Coast	Inactive	(Note: Chapter was created from Epsilon Theta Kappa (local), established in 1924.)
**Gamma Beta**	May 22, 1925 – 1985; 1987	Florida State University	Tallahassee, Florida	Southern	Active	
**Alpha Epsilon**	October 23, 1925	Westminster College	New Wilmington, Pennsylvania	Northeastern	Active	(Note: Chapter was created from Delta Tau (local), established in 1913.)
Beta Alpha	October 14, 1927 – February 25, 2025	Nebraska Wesleyan University	Lincoln, Nebraska	Midwest	Inactive	(Note: Chapter was created from Alpha Kappa Delta (local), established in 1912.)
Epsilon Gamma	April 4, 1928 – June 18, 2008	University of Denver	Denver, Colorado	Mid-South	Inactive	(Note: Chapter was created from Alpha Gamma (local), established in 1924.)
Gamma Gamma	May 10, 1930 – May 17, 1977	Queens University of Charlotte	Charlotte, North Carolina	Southern	Inactive	(Note: Chapter was created from Phi Delta Chi (local), established in 1926.)
**Delta Zeta**	May 10, 1930	University of British Columbia	Vancouver, British Columbia, Canada	West Coast	Active	(Note: Chapter was created from Alpha Gamma (local), established in 1929.)
**Beta Beta**	May 16, 1930	North Dakota State University	Fargo, North Dakota	Midwest	Active	(Note: Chapter was created from Phi Kappa Lambda (local), established in 1924.)
**Beta Gamma**	May 19, 1930	University of Manitoba	Fort Garry, Winnipeg, Manitoba, Canada	Midwest	Active	(Note: Chapter was created from Omega Delta Pi (local), established in 1929.)
Alpha Zeta	June 13, 1930 – 1985	McGill University	Montreal, Quebec, Canada	Northeastern	Inactive	
**Alpha Eta**	February 12, 1932	Dalhousie University	Halifax, Nova Scotia, Canada	Northeastern	Active	(Note: Chapter was created from Kappa Kappa Sigma (local), established in 1929.)
Alpha Theta	February 6, 1937 – January 1, 1963	Hunter College	New York City, New York	Northeastern	Inactive	(Note: Chapter was created from Gamma Tau Kappa (local), established in 1898.)
**Gamma Delta**	April 22, 1939	Auburn University	Auburn, Alabama	Southern	Active	(Note: Chapter was created from Alpha Gamma (local), established in 1938.)
Epsilon Delta	May 11, 1940 – May 31, 1972; March 31, 1986 – May 30, 1996	University of Texas at Austin	Austin, Texas	Mid-South	Inactive	
**Alpha Iota**	November 2, 1940	Baldwin Wallace University	Berea, Ohio	Northeastern	Active	(Note: Chapter was originally the Alethian Literary Society, existing from 1855 to 1918. It became Alpha Kappa Sigma (local) in 1918, then accepted its charter from ΑΓΔ in 1940.)
Gamma Epsilon	June 1, 1945 – February 3, 1965	University of North Carolina at Chapel Hill	Chapel Hill, North Carolina	Southern	Inactive	
Alpha Kappa	November 17, 1945 – December 8, 2008	Bowling Green State University	Bowling Green, Ohio	Northeastern	Inactive	(Note: Chapter was created from the Phrata Club (local), established in 1933.)
**Alpha Lambda**	June 1, 1946 – 1971; 1980	Ohio State University	Columbus, Ohio	Northeastern	Active	(Note: Chapter was created from Gamma Phi Lambda (local), established in 1924.)
**Epsilon Epsilon**	October 26, 1946	William Jewell College	Liberty, Missouri	Mid-South	Active	
**Gamma Zeta**	April 12, 1947	University of Memphis	Memphis, Tennessee	Southern	Active	(Note: Chapter was created from Xi Beta Nu (local), established in 1929.)
Alpha Mu	May 24, 1947 – May 2, 2001	Pennsylvania State University	University Park, Pennsylvania	Northeastern	Inactive	(Note: Chapter was created from the Aldebaran Club (local), established in 1946.)
**Beta Delta**	October 11, 1947	Indiana University Bloomington	Bloomington, Indiana	Midwest	Active	
Alpha Nu	December 6, 1947 – May 5, 1978	Kent State University	Kent, Ohio	Northeastern	Inactive	(Note: Chapter was created from Beta Tau Alpha (local) or Beta Tau Zeta (local), established in 1925. That group became the Psi chapter of Pi Kappa Sigma in 1926. In 1938, it absorbed Chi Delta (local), established in 1935. It joined ΑΓΔ in 1947.)
Alpha Xi	December 13, 1947 – October 20, 1992	University of Maryland, College Park	College Park, Maryland	Northeastern	Inactive	
**Alpha Omicron**	March 20, 1948	West Virginia Wesleyan College	Buckhannon, West Virginia	Northeastern	Active	(Note: Chapter was created from Sigma Pi Delta (local), established in 1926.)
**Epsilon Zeta**	May 8, 1948	Arkansas State University	Jonesboro, Arkansas	Mid-South	Active	(Note: Chapter was created from Alpha Tau Zeta (local), established in 1937.)
**Delta Eta**	October 1, 1949 – December 1, 1991; February 1, 2014	San Diego State University	San Diego, California	West Coast	Active	(Note: Chapter was created from Gamma Phi Zeta (local), established in 1924.)
**Beta Epsilon**	May 17, 1952	Carroll University	Waukesha, Wisconsin	Midwest	Active	(Note: Chapter was created from Beta Chi Theta (local), established in 1910.)
Epsilon Eta	April 16, 1955 – May 31, 1977; 1995–1997}	Texas Christian University	Fort Worth, Texas	Mid-South	Inactive	
**Gamma Eta**	November 5, 1955	High Point University	High Point, North Carolina	Southern	Active	(Note: Chapter was created from Sigma Alpha Phi (local), established in 1928.)
Beta Zeta	May 25, 1957 – August 1, 1973	Parsons College	Fairfield, Iowa	Midwest	Inactive	(Note: Chapter was created from the Elzevir Club (local), established in 1883. It went dormant when the college closed in 1973.)
**Beta Eta**	September 21, 1957	Southern Illinois University Carbondale	Carbondale, Illinois	Midwest	Active	(Note: Chapter was originally Epsilon Beta (local), established in 1924. In 1928, it became the Alpha Delta chapter of the now-dormant national sorority Delta Sigma Epsilon. When that sorority merged with Delta Zeta, it briefly became Nu Delta Sigma (local) before petitioning to become a chapter of ΑΓΔ in 1956.)
Gamma Theta	April 26, 1958 – May 1, 1978	Florida Southern College	Lakeland, Florida	Southern	Inactive	
**Delta Theta**	August 26, 1958	University of Idaho	Moscow, Idaho	West Coast	Active	
Epsilon Theta	November 15, 1958 – May 2, 1988	University of Colorado Boulder	Boulder, Colorado	Mid-South	Inactive	
**Alpha Pi**	January 31, 1959	Wayne State University	Detroit, Michigan	Northeastern	Active	(Note: Chapter was created from Sigma Sigma (local), established in 1926.)
**Epsilon Mu**	September 12, 1959	Fort Hays State University	Hays, Kansas	Mid-South	Active	(Note: Chapter was gained in the national merger with Theta Sigma Upsilon. It was the ΘΣΥ Mu chapter, established in 1928.)
Gamma Kappa	September 26, 1959 – September 1, 1963	Northwestern State University	Natchitoches, Louisiana	Southern	Inactive	(Note: Chapter was gained through the national merger with Theta Sigma Upsilon. It was the ΘΣΥ Kappa chapter, established in 1928.)
Epsilon Iota	October 3, 1959 – October 2, 1980	University of Northern Colorado	Greeley, Colorado	Mid-South	Inactive	(Note: Chapter was gained in the national merger with Theta Sigma Upsilon. It was the ΘΣΥ Iota chapter, established in 1928.)
**Epsilon Kappa**	October 3, 1959	Pittsburg State University	Pittsburg, Kansas	Mid-South	Active	(Note: The chapter was gained in the national merger with Theta Sigma Upsilon. It was the ΘΣΥ Epsilon chapter, established in 1924.)
**Gamma Lambda**	October 10, 1959	Longwood University	Farmville, Virginia	Southern	Active	(Note: Chapter was gained through the national merger with Theta Sigma Upsilon. It was ΘΣΥ's Tau chapter, established in 1939.)
**Epsilon Lambda**	October 31, 1959	University of Central Missouri	Warrensburg, Missouri	Mid-South	Active	(Note: The chapter was gained in the national merger with Theta Sigma Upsilon. It was ΘΣΥ's Nu chapter, established in 1928. Before merging with ΘΣΥ, it briefly became Omega Sigma (local).)
**Beta Theta**	October 31, 1959 – May 16, 1980; December 2, 2017	University of Wisconsin–Whitewater	Whitewater, Wisconsin	Midwest	Active	(Note: The chapter was gained in the national merger with Theta Sigma Upsilon. It was the ΘΣΥ Rho chapter, established in 1936.)
**Delta Iota**	November 7, 1959	California State University, Chico	Chico, California	West Coast	Active	(Note: The chapter was gained in the national merger with Theta Sigma Upsilon. It was the ΘΣΥ Omicron chapter, established in 1931.)
Alpha Tau	November 14, 1959 – May 8, 2019	Edinboro University of Pennsylvania	Edinboro, Pennsylvania	Northeastern	Inactive	(Note: The chapter was gained in the national merger with Theta Sigma Upsilon. It was the ΘΣΥ Gamma chapter, established in 1924.)
Gamma Mu	November 21, 1959 – March 23, 1990	James Madison University	Harrisonburg, Virginia	Southern	Inactive	(Note: The chapter was gained in the national merger with Theta Sigma Upsilon. It was the ΘΣΥ Phi chapter, established in 1942.)
Alpha Rho	November 21, 1959 – April 6, 1979	Temple University	Philadelphia, Pennsylvania	Northeastern	Inactive	(Note: The chapter was gained in the national merger with Theta Sigma Upsilon. It was the ΘΣΥ Gamma chapter, established in 1924.)
**Alpha Upsilon**	November 21, 1959	Central Michigan University	Mount Pleasant, Michigan	Northeastern	Active	(Note: The chapter was gained in the national merger with Theta Sigma Upsilon. It was the ΘΣΥ Upsilon chapter, established in 1941.)
**Alpha Sigma**	December 5, 1959	Indiana University of Pennsylvania	Indiana, Pennsylvania	Northeastern	Active	(Note: Chapter was gained in the national merger with Theta Sigma Upsilon. It was the ΘΣΥ Pi chapter, established in 1935.)
**Gamma Iota**	February 27, 1960	Mercer University	Macon, Georgia	Southern	Active	
**Beta Iota**	September 24, 1960	Eastern Illinois University	Charleston, Illinois	Midwest	Active	(Note: Chapter started as Psi Omega (local), established October 15, 1959.)
**Epsilon Nu**	October 29, 1960	University of Central Oklahoma	Edmond, Oklahoma	Mid-South	Active	(Note: Chapter was created from the Shakespeare Club (local), established in 1909.)
Alpha Phi	October 1, 1961 – March 1, 1975	Marietta College	Marietta, Georgia	Northeastern	Inactive	
**Gamma Nu**	November 4, 1961 – May 8, 1966; 2024	University of Tennessee	Knoxville, Tennessee	Southern	Active	
Alpha Chi	November 4, 1961 – December 20, 1994	Thiel College	Greenville, Pennsylvania	Northeastern	Inactive	(Note: Chapter was created from Gamma Theta (local), established in 1959.)
Alpha Psi	May 11, 1963 – March 30, 1979	Ferris State University	Big Rapids, Michigan	Northeastern	Inactive	(Note: Chapter was created from Alpha Phi Beta (local), established in 1926.)
Beta Kappa	April 18, 1964 – December 13, 1995	University of Iowa	Iowa City, Iowa	Midwest	Inactive	
**Delta Kappa**	February 29, 1964	University of Alberta	Edmonton, Alberta, Canada	West Coast	Active	
Beta Lambda	May 14, 1966 – May 1, 1970	University of South Dakota	Vermillion, South Dakota	Midwest	Inactive	
Beta Mu	May 20, 1967 – May 1, 1973	Minnesota State University, Mankato	Mankato, Minnesota	Midwest	Inactive	(Note: Chapter was created from Tau Delta Rho (local), established in 1965.)
**Gamma Xi**	October 29, 1966	Murray State University	Murray, Kentucky	Southern	Active	
Beta Nu	March 16, 1968 – November 30, 1979	University of Northern Iowa	Cedar Falls, Iowa	Midwest	Inactive	(Note: Chapter was created from Pi Theta Pi (local), established in 1904.)
Epsilon Xi	April 20, 1968 – January 18, 2014	East Central University	Ada, Oklahoma	Mid-South	Inactive	
**Beta Xi**	April 27, 1968	Purdue University	West Lafayette, Indiana	Midwest	Active	
**Gamma Omicron**	October 26, 1968	Eastern Kentucky University	Richmond, Kentucky	Southern	Active	(Note: Chapter was created from Pi Alpha Theta (local), established in 1966.)
Gamma Pi	May 3, 1969 – March 31, 1985	Middle Tennessee State University	Murfreesboro, Tennessee	Southern	Inactive	(Note: Chapter was created from Alpha Gamma Phi (local), established in 1966.)
Gamma Rho	May 9, 1970 – June 18, 1996	Armstrong State University	Savannah, Georgia	Southern	Inactive	(Note: Chapter was created from Alpha Tau Beta (local), established in 1937.)
**Gamma Sigma**	February 6, 1971	Troy University	Troy, Alabama	Southern	Active	(Note: Chapter was created from Alpha Omega (local), established on May 30, 1969 with the intention of becoming a national sorority.)
**Gamma Tau**	April 3, 1971	University of West Georgia	Carrollton, Georgia	Southern	Active	(Note: Chapter was created from Sigma Chi Omega (local), established in 1968.)
**Alpha Omega**	April 17, 1971	Duquesne University	Pittsburgh, Pennsylvania	Northeastern	Active	(Note: Chapter was created from Beta Chi Beta (local), established in 1958.)
**Gamma Upsilon**	February 12, 1972	University of Montevallo	Montevallo, Alabama	Southern	Active	(Note: Chapter was created from Alpha Zeta Gamma (local), established in 1971.)
**Gamma Phi**	April 8, 1972	Georgia Tech	Atlanta, Georgia	Southern	Active	
**Beta Omicron**	March 10, 1973	Illinois State University	Normal, Illinois	Midwest	Active	
Epsilon Omicron	February 9, 1974 – April 23, 1990	Southwestern Oklahoma State University	Weatherford, Oklahoma	Mid-South	Inactive	
**Zeta Alpha**	February 23, 1974	Eastern Michigan University	Ypsilanti, Michigan	Northeastern	Active	
Gamma Chi	April 20, 1974 – November 18, 1983	Nicholls State University	Thibodaux, Louisiana	Southern	Inactive	
Epsilon Rho	May 10, 1975 – May 31, 1999	Texas A&M University	College Station, Texas	Mid-South	Inactive	
**Zeta Beta**	February 7, 1976	Lehigh University	Bethlehem, Pennsylvania	Northeastern	Active	
**Zeta Gamma**	September 18, 1976	Gannon University	Erie, Pennsylvania	Northeastern	Active	
Epsilon Sigma	February 6, 1977 – May 15, 1987	Cameron University	Lawton, Oklahoma	Mid-South	Inactive	
**Gamma Psi**	April 16, 1977	University of North Alabama	Florence, Alabama	Southern	Active	
Delta Lambda	May 15, 1977 – April 15, 1979; April 30, 1983 – December 15, 1985	Montana State University Billings	Billings, Montana	West Coast	Inactive	
Epsilon Tau	October 2, 1977 – October 30, 1982	Colorado School of Mines	Golden, Colorado	Mid-South	Inactive	
**Gamma Omega**	May 20, 1978	University of Alabama at Birmingham	Birmingham, Alabama	Southern	Active	
Theta Alpha	February 4, 1979 – November 16, 1985	Louisiana State University	Baton Rouge, Louisiana	Southern	Inactive	
**Zeta Delta**	March 31, 1979	Towson University	Towson, Maryland	Northeastern	Active	
**Theta Beta**	April 7, 1979	Auburn University at Montgomery	Montgomery, Alabama	Southern	Active	
**Zeta Epsilon**	May 4, 1979	Michigan Technological University	Houghton, Michigan	Northeastern	Active	(Note: Chapter was created from Phi Lambda Beta (local), established in 1958.)
Beta Pi	May 20, 1979 – April 11, 1985	University of St. Thomas	Saint Paul, Minnesota	Midwest	Inactive	
**Zeta Zeta**	February 16, 1980	Worcester Polytechnic Institute	Worcester, Massachusetts	Northeastern	Active	
**Zeta Eta**	May 10, 1980	Rensselaer Polytechnic Institute	Troy, New York	Northeastern	Active	(Note: Chapter was created from Delta Epsilon (local), established in 1979.)
Theta Gamma	September 13, 1980 – March 9, 1984	Georgia Southern University	Statesboro, Georgia	Southern	Inactive	
Delta Mu	January 24, 1981 – February 22, 1984	University of California, Santa Barbara	Santa Barbara, California	West Coast	Inactive	
**Zeta Theta**	December 5, 1981	Lafayette College	Easton, Pennsylvania	Northeastern	Active	(Note: Chapter was created from Phi Beta Epsilon (a local sorority, not to be confused with the men's local at MIT), established in 1980.)
Zeta Iota	February 20, 1982 – January 31, 2015	Miami University	Oxford, Ohio	Northeastern	Inactive	
Zeta Kappa	November 13, 1982 – August 30, 2015	University of Pittsburgh at Johnstown	Johnstown, Pennsylvania	Northeastern	Inactive	
**Theta Delta**	March 6, 1983	University of North Georgia	Dahlonega, Georgia	Southern	Active	(Note: Chapter was created from Alpha Gamma Chi (local), established in 1981.)
Zeta Lambda	April 30, 1983 – December 15, 1985	University of Findlay	Findlay, Ohio	Northeastern	Inactive	(Note: Chapter was created from Sigma Delta (local), established in 1977.)
**Delta Nu**	May 14, 1983	University of Calgary	Calgary, Alberta, Canada	West Coast	Active	(Note: Chapter was created from Delta Tau Kappa (local), established in 1981.)
**Theta Epsilon**	May 19, 1984	University of South Alabama	Mobile, Alabama	Southern	Active	
**Epsilon Upsilon**	January 19, 1985	Tarleton State University	Stephenville, Texas	Mid-South	Active	
Zeta Mu	January 26, 1985 – September 29, 2008	Stockton University	Galloway Township, New Jersey	Northeastern	Inactive	(Note: Chapter was created from Kappa Delta Kappa (local), established before 1985.)
**Epsilon Phi**	January 28, 1985	Texas Woman's University	Denton, Texas	Mid-South	Active	
**Zeta Nu**	March 31, 1985	Alma College	Alma, Michigan	Northeastern	Active	(Note: Chapter was created from Delta Phi Omega (local), established in 1983.)
Zeta Xi	April 20, 1985 – November 12, 1990	Cornell University	Ithaca, New York	Northeastern	Inactive	
Beta Rho	April 5, 1986	University of Southern Indiana	Evansville, Indiana	Midwest	Inactive	
Beta Sigma	May 3, 1986 – November 9, 1992	Creighton University	Omaha, Nebraska	Midwest	Inactive	(Note: Chapter was created from Alpha Sigma Gamma (local), established in 1971.)
**Zeta Omicron**	May 3, 1986	Kettering University	Flint, Michigan	Northeastern	Active	(Note: Chapter was created from Beta Sigma Phi (local), established in 1978.)
**Epsilon Chi**	September 25, 1986 – April 5, 1989; November 11, 2015	Kansas State University	Manhattan, Kansas	Mid-South	Active	
**Zeta Pi**	February 7, 1987	Saint Joseph's University	Philadelphia, Pennsylvania	Northeastern	Active	
Delta Xi	February 7, 1987 – May 31, 2005; May 1, 2010 – 2021	Arizona State University	Tempe, Arizona	West Coast	Inactive	
**Theta Zeta**	February 14, 1987	Randolph–Macon College	Ashland, Virginia	Southern	Active	
Zeta Rho	February 20, 1988 – February 20, 1992	Quinnipiac University	Hamden, Connecticut	Northeastern	Inactive	
**Zeta Sigma**	October 29, 1988	Northwood University	Midland, Michigan	Northeastern	Active	
**Beta Tau**	November 5, 1988	Ball State University	Muncie, Indiana	Midwest	Active	(Note: Chapter was created from Lambda Gamma Gamma (local), established in 1987.)
Theta Eta	March 4, 1989 – March 18, 2000	University of Tennessee at Martin	Martin, Tennessee	Southern	Inactive	
**Delta Omicron**	March 4, 1989	University of Nevada, Las Vegas	Paradise, Nevada	West Coast	Active	
Theta Theta	April 29, 1989 – February 22, 2002	Mississippi State University	Starkville, Mississippi	Southern	Inactive	
**Zeta Tau**	May 6, 1989	Seton Hall University	South Orange, New Jersey	Northeastern	Active	(Note: Chapter was created from Chi Delta Rho (local), established in 1967.)
**Zeta Upsilon**	November 11, 1989	Northern Michigan University	Marquette, Michigan	Northeastern	Active	
**Theta Iota**	January 27, 1990	Western Kentucky University	Bowling Green, Kentucky	Southern	Active	
Theta Kappa	February 20, 1990 – April 30, 1992	University of Virginia	Charlottesville, Virginia	Southern	Inactive	
**Theta Lambda**	April 7, 1990	University of West Florida	Pensacola, Florida	Southern	Active	
**Theta Mu**	February 9, 1991	University of North Carolina Wilmington	Wilmington, North Carolina	Southern	Active	
Zeta Phi	February 9, 1991 – 1997	McMaster University	Hamilton, Ontario, Canada	Northeastern	Inactive	(Note: Chapter formed from Kappa Delta Psi (local). McMaster University stopped recognizing Greek organizations in 1989.)
**Delta Pi**	March 2, 1991	San Francisco State University	San Francisco, California	West Coast	Active	
**Delta Rho**	May 11, 1991	Sonoma State University	Rohnert Park, California	West Coast	Active	(Note: Chapter was created from Delta Theta Chi (local), established before 1991.)
**Delta Sigma**	March 13, 1992	University of Hawaiʻi at Mānoa	Honolulu, Hawaii	West Coast	Active	
**Zeta Chi**	March 28, 1992	University of Western Ontario	London, Ontario, Canada	Northeastern	Active	
**Epsilon Psi**	April 3, 1992	University of Texas at Dallas	Richardson, Texas	Mid-South	Active	
Zeta Psi	January 23, 1993 – November 29, 2000	Western Michigan University	Kalamazoo, Michigan	Northeastern	Inactive	
**Epsilon Omega**	April 16, 1993	Truman State University	Kirksville, Missouri	Mid-South	Active	(Note: Chapter was created from Gamma Phi Sigma (local), established before 1993. Not to be confused with the Latino fraternity of the same name, at Temple.)
**Theta Nu**	October 30, 1993	Virginia Commonwealth University	Richmond, Virginia	Southern	Active	
Theta Xi	April 29, 1994 – February 29, 2000	Clemson University	Clemson, South Carolina	Southern	Inactive	
Kappa Alpha	November 11, 1995 – December 1, 1997	Avila University	Kansas City, Missouri	Mid-South	Inactive	
**Kappa Beta**	November 18, 1995	Missouri Western State University	St. Joseph, Missouri	Mid-South	Active	
**Theta Omicron**	February 24, 1996	Western Carolina University	Cullowhee, North Carolina	Southern	Active	
Theta Pi	February 22, 1997 – May 31, 2010	Lambuth University	Jackson, Tennessee	Southern	Inactive	
Theta Rho	March 28, 1998 – May 6, 2005	Barry University	Miami Shores, Florida	Southern	Inactive	
Theta Sigma	May 15, 1998 – May 4, 2007	Valdosta State University	Valdosta, Georgia	Southern	Inactive	
**Kappa Gamma**	February 27, 1999	Texas A&M University–Corpus Christi	Corpus Christi, Texas	Mid-South	Active	
**Theta Tau**	October 30, 1999	Belmont University	Nashville, Tennessee	Southern	Active	
**Theta Upsilon**	December 11, 1999	Georgetown College	Georgetown, Kentucky	Southern	Active	
Theta Phi	February 10, 2001 – June 1, 2009	University of Tampa	Tampa, Florida	Southern	Inactive	
**Delta Tau**	March 22, 2003	Chapman University	Orange, California	West Coast	Active	
Theta Chi	April 29, 2006 – May 10, 2011	Virginia Tech	Blacksburg, Virginia	Southern	Inactive	
**Beta Upsilon**	May 3, 2008	Roosevelt University	Chicago, Illinois	Midwest	Active	(Note: Chapter was created from Alpha Sigma (local), established before 2008.)
Zeta Omega	November 21, 2009 – 2023	Ontario Tech University	Oshawa, Ontario, Canada	Northeastern	Inactive	
**Kappa Delta**	December 5, 2009	Westminster College	Fulton, Missouri	Mid-South	Active	
**Delta Upsilon**	December 4, 2010	Boise State University	Boise, Idaho	West Coast	Active	
**Theta Psi**	December 4, 2011	Austin Peay State University	Clarksville, Tennessee	Southern	Active	
**Lambda Alpha**	May 12, 2012	St. Joseph's University	Long Island, New York	Northeastern	Active	
**Lambda Beta**	May 12, 2012	St. Joseph's University	Brooklyn, New York	Northeastern	Inactive ?	
**Theta Omega**	November 18, 2012	University of South Carolina	Columbia, South Carolina	Southern	Active	
**Lambda Gamma**	April 20, 2013	Villanova University	Villanova, Pennsylvania	Northeastern	Active	
**Nu Alpha**	December 6, 2014	Appalachian State University	Boone, North Carolina	Southern	Active	
Delta Phi	April 9, 2016 – January 30, 2019	California Polytechnic State University, San Luis Obispo	San Luis Obispo, California	West Coast	Inactive	
**Lambda Delta**	April 30, 2016	Rutgers University–New Brunswick	New Brunswick, New Jersey	Northeastern	Active	
**Nu Beta**	December 4, 2016	University of Tennessee at Chattanooga	Chattanooga, Tennessee	Southern	Active	
**Kappa Epsilon**	April 28, 2017	Texas State University	San Marcos, Texas	Mid-South	Active	
**Nu Gamma**	November 12, 2017	East Carolina University	Greenville, North Carolina	Southern	Active	
**Nu Delta**	April 21, 2018	Georgia College & State University	Milledgeville, Georgia	Southern	Active	
**Lambda Epsilon**	April 29, 2018	Case Western Reserve University	Cleveland, Ohio	Northeastern	Active	
**Beta Phi**	November 9, 2019	Valparaiso University	Valparaiso, Indiana	Midwest	Active	
**Nu Epsilon**	November 8, 2025	Shenandoah University	Winchester, Virginia	Southern	Active	(Note: Colony established in 2025.)
University of South Carolina Beaufort Colony		University of South Carolina Beaufort	Beaufort, South Carolina	Southern	Colony	(Note: Colony established in 2017.)

== Alumnae chapters ==
Following are the alumnae chapters, clubs, and junior circles of Alpha Gamma Delta, with active chapters indicated in bold and inactive chapters in italics. Junior circles are for members who are under forty years old.

Chapter	Founded	Location	Status	Ref.
**Alpha Alumnae Chapter**		Syracuse, New York	Active	
**Alpha Eta Alumnae Chapter**		Halifax, Nova Scotia, Canada	Active	
**Alpha Omicron Alumnae Chapter**		Buckhannon, West Virginia	Active	
**Atlanta Alumnae Chapter**		Atlanta, Georgia	Active	
**Auburn-Opelika Alumnae Chapter**		Auburn, Alabama	Active	
**Austin Area Alumnae Chapter**		Austin, Texas	Active	
**Beta Alpha Alumnae Chapter**		Lincoln, Nebraska	Active	
**Beta Beta Alumnae Chapter**		Fargo, North Dakota	Active	
**Beta Eta Alumnae Chapter**		Carbondale, Illinois	Active	
**Beta Iota Alumnae Chapter**		Charleston, Illinois	Active	
**Beta Kappa Alumnae Chapter**		Iowa City, Iowa	Active	
**Big Sky Alumnae Chapter**		Bozeman, Montana	Active	
**Birmingham Area Alumnae Chapter**		Birmingham, Alabama	Active	
**Bluegrass Alumnae Chapter**		Lexington, Kentucky	Active	
**Calgary Area Alumnae Chapter**		Calgary, Alberta, Canada	Active	
**Central Florida Alumnae Club**		Orlando, Florida	Active	
**Central Ohio Alumnae Chapter**		Columbus, Ohio	Active	
**Charlotte Alumnae Chapter**		Charlotte, North Carolina	Active	
**Chesapeake Alumnae Chapter**		Baltimore, Maryland	Active	
**Chicago Northwest Suburban Alumnae Club**		Arlington Heights, Illinois	Active	
**Chicago West Suburban Alumnae Club**		Chicago, Illinois	Active	
**Clarksville Area Alumnae Chapter**		Clarksville, Tennessee	Active	
Columbus, Phenix City Alumnae Club		Columbus, Georgia	Inactive	
**Dallas Alumnae Chapter**		Dallas, Texas	Active	
**Dallas Junior Circle**		Dallas, Texas	Active	
**Dayton Ohio Alumnae Club**		Dayton, Ohio	Active	
**Delta Eta Alumnae Chapter**		San Diego, California	Active	
**Delta Iota Alumnae Chapter**		Chico, California	Active	
**Delta Theta Alumnae Chapter**		Moscow, Idaho	Active	
**Denver Metro. Alumnae Chapter**		Denver, Colorado	Active	
Detroit North Suburban Alumnae Club		Detroit, Michigan	Inactive	
**DuPage Area Alumnae Club**	1954	Naperville, Illinois	Active	
**Durham Region Alumnae Chapter**		Oshawa, Ontario, Canada	Active	
**Edmonton Area Alumnae Chapter**		Edmonton, Alberta, Canada	Active	
Epsilon Epsilon Alumnae Chapter		Liberty, Missouri	Inactive	
**Epsilon Kappa Alumnae Chapter**		Pittsburg, Kansas	Active	
**Epsilon Lambda Alumnae Chapter**		Warrensburg, Missouri	Active	
**Epsilon Mu Alumnae Chapter**		Hays, Kansas	Active	
**Epsilon Nu Alumnae Chapter**		Edmond, Oklahoma	Active	
**Epsilon Upsilon Alumnae Chapter**		Stephenville, Texas	Active	
Epsilon Zeta Alumnae Chapter		Jonesboro, Arkansas	Inactive	
**Fort Worth Area Alumnae Chapter**		Fort Worth, Texas	Active	
**Fox Valley Alumnae Club**		Aurora, Illinois	Active	
**Gamma Alpha & Athens Alumnae Club**		Athens, Georgia	Active	
**Greater Boston Alumnae Chapter**		Boston, Massachusetts	Active	
**Greater Buffalo Alumnae Chapter**		Buffalo, New York	Active	
**Greater Cleveland Alumnae Chapter**		Cleveland, Ohio	Active	
**Greater Ft. Lauderdale Junior Circle**		Fort Lauderdale, Florida	Active	
**Greater Ft. Lauderdale Alumnae Club**		Fort Lauderdale, Florida	Active	
**Greater Kansas City Alumnae Club**		Kansas City, Missouri	Active	
**Greater Kansas City Alumnae Club**		Kansas City, Kansas	Active	
**Greater Portland Alumnae Club**		Portland, Oregon	Active	
**Greater Pittsburgh Alumnae Chapter**		Pittsburgh, Pennsylvania	Active	
**Greater Raleigh Alumnae Chapter**		Raleigh, North Carolina	Active	
**Greater Seattle Alumnae Chapter**		Seattle, Washington	Active	
**Greater Seattle Junior Circle**		Seattle, Washington	Active	
**Hampton Roads Junior Circle**		Virginia Beach, Virginia	Active	
**Hawaii Alumnae Chapter**		Honolulu, Hawaii	Active	
**Heart of Virginia Alumnae Chapter**		Richmond, Virginia	Active	
**Houston Alumnae Club**		Houston, Texas	Active	
Indianapolis Alumnae Club		Indianapolis, Indiana	Inactive	
**Las Vegas Area Alumnae Chapter**		Las Vegas, Nevada	Active	
**Las Vegas Junior Circle**		Las Vegas, Nevada	Active	
Long Beach Alumnae Club		Long Beach, California	Inactive	
**Los Angeles Area Alumnae Chapter**		Los Angeles, California	Active	
**Manitoba Junior Circle**		Winnipeg, Manitoba, Canada	Active	
**Memphis Area Alumnae Chapter**		Memphis, Tennessee	Active	
Mid-Michigan Alumnae Chapter		Midland, Texas	Inactive	
**Middle Georgia Junior Circle**		Macon, Georgia	Active	
**Mobile Area Alumnae Chapter**		Mobile, Alabama	Active	
**Montgomery Alumnae Chapter**		Montgomery, Alabama	Active	
**Nashville Alumnae Chapter**		Nashville, Tennessee	Active	
**Nashville Junior Circle**		Nashville, Tennessee	Active	
**National Capital Region of Canada Alumnae Club**		Ottawa, Ontario, Canada	Active	
**Norman Alumnae Chapter**		Norman, Oklahoma	Active	
**North Alabama Alumnae Chapter**		Florence, Alabama	Active	
**North Atlanta Alumnae Club**		Atlanta, Georgia	Active	
**North Texas Alumnae Chapter**		Texas	Active	
**Northern Nevada Alumnae Club**		Reno, Nevada	Active	
Northwest Florida Alumnae Chapter		Pensacola, Florida	Inactive	
**Old Dominion Alumnae Club**	1953	Fairfax, Virginia	Active	
**Oklahoma City Alumnae Club**		Oklahoma City, Oklahoma	Active	
**Omaha Area Alumnae Chapter**		Omaha, Nebraska	Active	
**Omega Alumnae Chapter**		Akron, Ohio	Active	
**Orange County Alumnae Chapter**		Orange County, California	Active	
**Palm Springs Area Alumnae Club**		Palm Springs, California	Active	
**Philadelphia Area Alumnae Chapter**		Philadelphia, Pennsylvania	Active	
**Phoenix Junior Circle**		Phoenix, Arizona	Active	
**Pi Alumnae Chapter**		Cedar Rapids, Iowa	Active	
**Pittsburgh Junior Circle**		Pittsburgh, Pennsylvania	Active	
**Pony Express Alumnae Chapter**		St. Joseph, Missouri	Active	
**Potomac Alumnae Chapter**		Potomac, Maryland	Active	
**Richmond Alumnae Chapter**		Richmond, Virginia	Active	
**St. Louis Alumnae Club**		St. Louis, Missouri	Active	
**San Antonio Junior Circle**		San Antonio, Texas	Active	
**San Francisco Bay Alumnae Chapter**		San Francisco, California	Active	
Santa Clara Valley Alumnae Club		Santa Clara, California	Inactive	
**Sarasota Area Alumnae Club**		Sarasota, Florida	Active	
**Sigma Alumnae Chapter**		Champaign, Illinois	Active	
South Georgia Alumnae Chapter		Georgia	Inactive	
**Southwest Florida Alumnae Club**		Fort Myers, Florida	Active	
**Southwest Michigan Alumnae Club**		Michigan	Active	
**Tallahassee Area Alumnae Chapter**		Tallahassee, Florida	Active	
**Tampa Bay Area Alumnae Chapter**		Tampa, Florida	Active	
**Tarrant County Alumnae Club**		Arlington, Texas	Active	
**Tau Alumnae Chapter**		Toronto, Ontario, Canada	Active	
**Theta Iota Alumnae Chapter**		Bowling Green, Kentucky	Active	
**Troy Area Alumnae Chapter**		Troy, Alabama	Active	
**Tucson-South Arizona Alumnae Club**		Tucson, Arizona	Active	
**Tulsa Alumnae Club**		Tulsa, Oklahoma	Active	
**Tuscaloosa Alumnae Chapter**		Tuscaloosa, Alabama	Active	
**Twin Cities Alumnae Chapter**		Minneapolis, Minnesota	Active	
**Valley of the Sun Alumnae Chapter**		Phoenix, Arizona	Active	
**Vancouver Alumnae Chapter**		Vancouver, British Columbia, Canada	Active	
**West Georgia Junior Circle**		Carrollton, Georgia	Active	
**Western Wayne County Alumnae Club**		Wayne County, Michigan	Active	(Note: Chapter is affiliated with Plymouth-Canton Community Schools.)
**Wichita Alumnae Club**		Wichita, Kansas	Active	
**Wisconsin Southeast Alumnae Chapter**		Waukesha, Wisconsin	Active	
Zeta Alumnae Chapter		Athens, Ohio	Inactive	
