= Jeffress =

Jeffress is an English surname. Notable people with the surname include:

- Arthur Jeffress (1905–1961), arts patron
- Gary Jeffress, American academic
- Gene Jeffress (born 1948), American politician
- Jeremy Jeffress (born 1987), American baseball pitcher
- Neville Jeffress (1920–2007), Australian advertising executive
- Robert Jeffress (born 1955), American pastor
- Steven Jeffress (born 1975), Australian golfer
