= Killebrew (surname) =

Killebrew is a surname. Notable people with the surname include:

- Emrys Killebrew, a fictional character that appears in comic books published by Marvel Comics as a supporting character of the Deadpool
- Flavius C. Killebrew (born 1949), President of Texas A&M University–Corpus Christi
- Gwendolyn Killebrew (1941–2021), American contralto
- Harmon Killebrew (1936–2011), American baseball player
- Joseph Buckner Killebrew (1831–1906), American farmer
- Miles Killebrew (born 1993), American football player
- Robert Killebrew (born 1984), American and Canadian football linebacker
