= International Institute for Higher Education in Morocco =

Higher education institution in Rabat, Morocco

- IIHEM
- Established: 1988
- Location: Rabat, Morocco
- Website: Official website

The International Institute for Higher Education is a private degree granting institution for higher education in the areas of management, science and technology. The Institute currently offers programs in management science, engineering, and computer information systems.

== Academics ==
IIHEM offers five-year programs in two Schools:

- School of Engineering:
  - Industrial Engineering
  - Software and Network Engineering
  - Civil Engineering
- School of Business Administration:
  - Management Science with majors in Finance, Marketing or Management Information Systems
  - Marketing and Communication

== Campus ==
The IIHEM campus is located in one of the prime residential areas of Rabat, and occupies a 12,000-m² area with over 7,000-m² of built space in three stories.

== Partnerships ==
IIHEM students and graduates wishing to pursue their undergraduate or graduate studies in the United States can benefit from the general IIHEM-TIEC partnership agreement.

== See also ==
- List of universities in Morocco
- Science and technology in Morocco
