= Cry the Darkness =

1993 autobiographical account

Cry the Darkness: One Woman's Triumph over the Tragedy of Incest
- Author: Donna Lewis Friess
- Language: English
- Genre: Non-fiction
- Publisher: Health Communications
- Publication date: 1993
- Followed by: Cherish the Light: One Woman's Journey from Darkness to Light

Cry the Darkness: One Woman's Triumph over the Tragedy of Incest is an autobiographical account by Donna L. Friess that details her father's sexual abuse of her and her niece, and how Friess has dealt with it. The book was published in 1993 by Health Communications.

== Summary ==
Friess was forced to confront and disclose the secret shame of being raped by her father during childhood. At the conclusion of the police investigation, the detective said to Friess,"In all my years as a police detective, I have never encountered a story such as this. This has got to be written." According to Friess, that remark prompted her to write the book.

Friess says that she had to surmount a lifetime of denial and realize that her father was not the upstanding citizen that he and the family portrayed him to be. Friess described the five months she spent writing her book as a "terrible" experience. For the first time, she had to examine her abuse, which she had "walled off," as well as examine generations of abuse within her family.

In a Los Angeles Times interview, she said, "The pain is like a tunnel. In order to heal, you have to go through it." However, Cry the Darkness is more than just a horrendous abuse, as Joyce Sweeney points out in her August 8, 1993, Sun-Sentinel book review. She states that Cry the Darkness is "A Family's Dark Secret, Told Warmly."

"Many books by incest survivors express the rage of the victim, or recount the "long journey" back to mental and sexual health, but do not really tell us what kind of phenomenon we are looking at, why it happens. How it feels.. .Told in a simple, first-person narrative, the book is almost warm and chatty, giving us an intimate knowledge of Friess, an eldest daughter, an overachiever, the typical "glue" that holds the dysfunctional family together. Her father is presented as a real person whom she loved and depended on. We see a childhood rendered all the more tragic because there are so many moments of warmth and good feeling between the father and the daughter that Friess pushes the horrifying side of the relationship out of her mind."

One review states that Friess has written an account that combines the brutal facts of her childhood with professional understanding and perspective.

The foreword to Cry the Darkness is written by Dr. Susan Forward, a therapist, lecturer and author of The New York Times bestseller, "Toxic Parents: Overcoming Their Hurtful Legacy and Reclaiming Your Life".

== Autobiographical elements ==
The book received media attention from the LA Times, Lear's Magazine article, "Incest: A Chilling Report" The Oprah Winfrey Show (September 8, 1991) and the Ronald Reagan Jr. show, (September 23, 1991).

Following a 15 month-long trial, Lewis was convicted of child molestation for abusing his granddaughter, Donna's niece. He refused to admit any guilt.

== Awards and honors ==
- Winner for Women's Issues. Indie Excellence Awards, 2014.
- Honorable Mention – Autobiography- Paris International Book Festival. 2014.
- Honorable Mention- Autobiography- New York Book Festival 2014.

== Related publications ==
- Cherish the Light: One Woman's Journey from Darkness to Light. Sequel to Cry the Darkness. HIH Publishing, CA, 2013.
- Women Leaders of the Movement to Stop Child Sexual Abuse. United States International University, San Diego Campus: Dissertation. 1993. (now Alliant University).
- Circle of Love: A Guide to Successful Relationships, 3rd Ed., HIH Publishing, CA. 2008
