= Jani Macari Pallis =

- Occupation: Mechanical Engineer
- Known for: Cislunar Aerospace, Biomedical Engineering Principles in Sports, the big book of air and space flight activities

Jani Macari Pallis is the founder and CEO of Cislunar Aerodynamics in San Francisco, California. She is also an associate professor of mechanical engineering at the University of Bridgeport in Bridgeport, Connecticut. Her areas of expertise are aerodynamics, biomedical engineering, and Sports science.

Pallis is believed to be the first mechanical engineer to examine the Wright Brothers artifacts at the Franklin Institute.

Pallis wrote a monthly column, "Tennis SET," at The Tennis Server. The column featured tennis science, engineering, and technology.

== Education ==
- Bachelor's and master's degrees from Georgia Institute of Technology, where she was a member of the women's fraternity Alpha Gamma Delta
- Master's degree in mechanical engineering from University of California, Berkeley
- PhD in mechanical and aeronautical engineering from University of California, Davis

== Publications ==
Hung and Pallis, Biomedical Engineering Principles in Sports

Pallis, the big book of air and space flight activities
