= Flavius C. Killebrew =

Dr. Flavius Charles Killebrew

10th President of Texas A&M University–Corpus Christi
- In office January 2005 – August 2017
- Preceded by: Robert R. Furgason
- Succeeded by: Kelly M. Miller

Personal details
- Born: April 2, 1949 (age 77)
- Citizenship: American
- Education: West Texas A&M University (Bachelor's, 1971; Master's, 1972); University of Arkansas at Fayetteville (Ph.D., 1976)

Dr. Flavius Charles Killebrew (born April 2, 1949) is a former American academic administrator. He was the 10th President of the Texas A&M University–Corpus Christi. He was appointed to the office in January 2005, in a unanimous vote by the Board of Regents of The Texas A&M University System. Prior to his appointment, Killebrew was Provost and Vice President for Academic Affairs at West Texas A&M University in Canyon, Texas.

== Prior Employment ==
- 1976 – Assistant Professor of Biology, West Texas A&M University
- 1988 – Professor of Biology, West Texas A&M University
- 1994-2004 – Provost and Vice President for Academic Affairs, West Texas A&M University

== Education ==
- 1971 – Bachelor's Degree, West Texas A&M University
- 1972 – Master's Degree, West Texas A&M University
- 1976 – Ph.D. in Zoology, University of Arkansas at Fayetteville

== Miscellaneous ==
- Member of American Association of State Colleges and Universities
- Member of Texas International Education Consortium

== Personal life ==
Killibrew is married to Kathy Bartley and has one daughter.
