= Samara O'Shea =

American author (born 1979)

Samara O'Shea (born September 22, 1979, in Philadelphia, Pennsylvania) is an American author, blogger, and professional letter writer.

She has written two books published by HarperCollins: For the Love of Letters: A 21st-Century Guide to the Art of Letter Writing and Note to Self: On Keeping a Journal and Other Dangerous Pursuits. She blogs for The Huffington Post, and has been a guest blogger for Powell's Books and TalkingMakeup.com. She also runs an online letter-writing service at LetterLover.net.

O'Shea spent her adolescent years in Mantua Township, New Jersey. She graduated from Clearview Regional High School in 1997 and from Duquesne University in 2001. In college, O'Shea wrote for the Duquesne Duke, was an intern at Pittsburgh Magazine, and presided as president of the Alpha Omega chapter of the national sorority Alpha Gamma Delta.

Following graduation, O'Shea moved to Manhattan to pursue a career in magazines before writing books, interning at O: The Oprah Magazine, Harper's Bazaar, and Esquire. Her writing has since appeared in Country Living, Woman's Day, and All You.

== Bibliography ==
- For the Love of Letters: A 21st-Century Guide to the Art of Letter Writing Publisher: Collins Living (April 24, 2007) ISBN 0-06-121530-9
- Note to Self: On Keeping a Journal and Other Dangerous Pursuits Publisher: Collins Living (July 22, 2008) ISBN 0-06-149415-1
- Loves Me...Not: How to Survive (and Thrive!) in the Face of Unrequited Love Publisher: February Books (January 28, 2014) ISBN 978-0984954384
