= Texas A&M University–Corpus Christi =

Public university in Corpus Christi, Texas, US

- Former names: University of Corpus Christi (1947–1971); Texas A&I University at Corpus Christi (1971–1977); Corpus Christi State University (1977–1993)
- Motto: The Island University
- Type: Public research university
- Established: 1947; 79 years ago
- Parent institution: Texas A&M University System
- Endowment: $61 million (FY2025)
- President: Kelly M. Miller
- Provost: Catherine Rudowsky
- Faculty: 712
- Students: 10,855 (fall 2023)
- Location: Corpus Christi, Texas, United States; 27.7121°N 97.3254°W
- Campus: Island, 396 acres (1602555.14 M²)
- Colors: Blue, Green, and Silver
- Nickname: Islanders
- Sporting affiliations: NCAA Division I – Southland
- Mascot: Izzy the Islander
- Website: tamucc.edu

Texas A&M University–Corpus Christi (Texas A&M–Corpus Christi, TAMU–CC, A&M–Corpus Christi, or A&M–CC) is a public research university on Ward Island in Corpus Christi, Texas, United States. It is part of the Texas A&M University System and classified among "R2: Doctoral Universities – High research activity".

== History ==
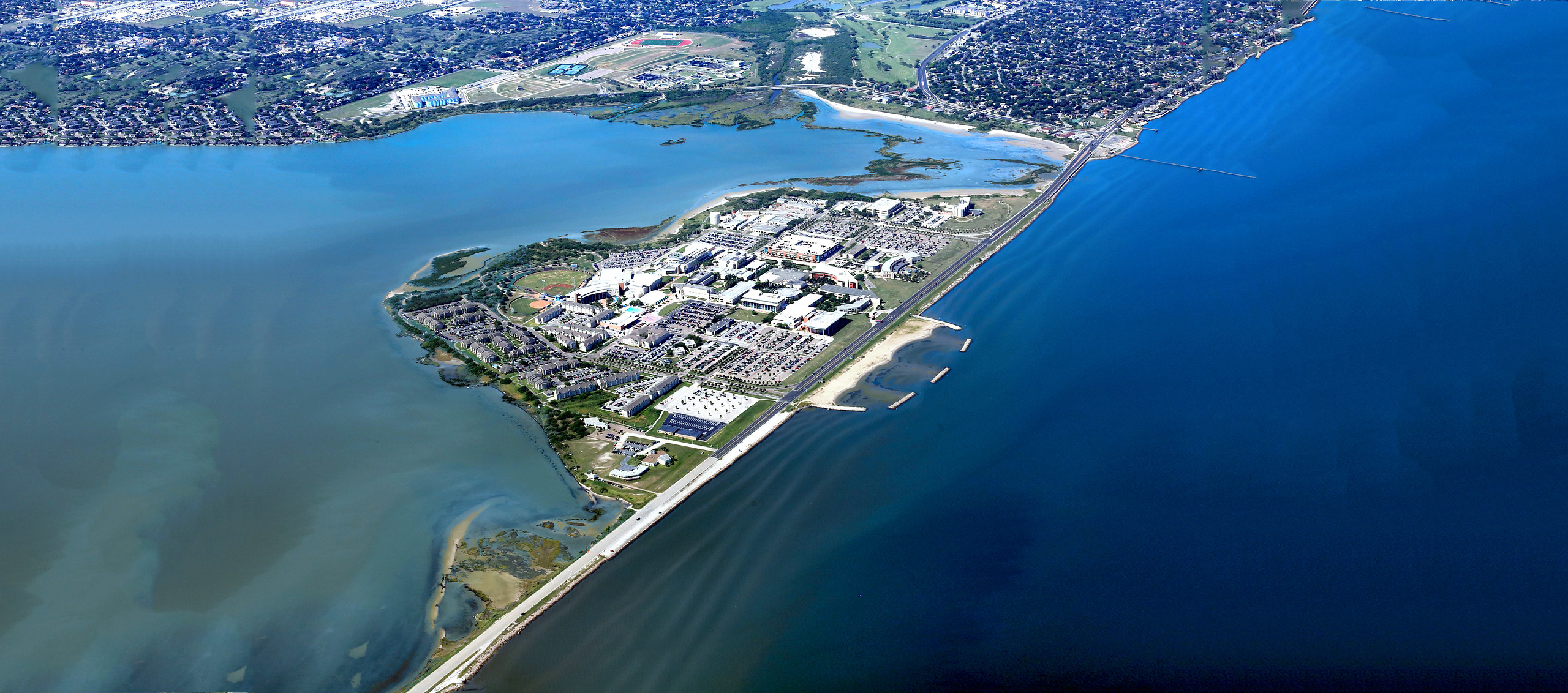
The university's island campus

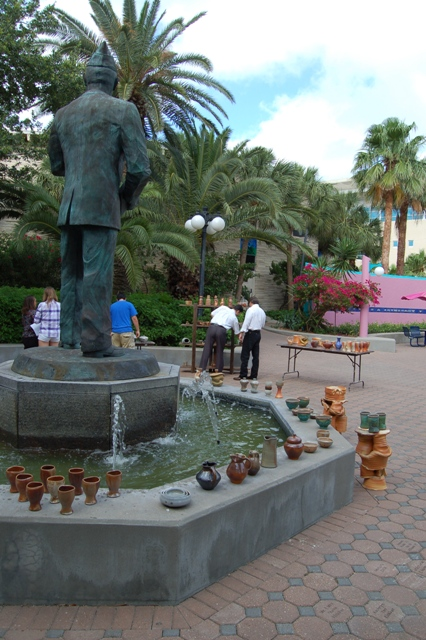
Pottery exhibit by art students in the Dr. Hector P. Garcia Plaza

TAMU-CC originally opened in 1947 as the University of Corpus Christi, a private university operated by the Baptist General Convention of Texas (BGCT).

After the campus on Ward Island (which is actually a peninsula separated from the mainland by wetlands) was severely damaged by Hurricane Celia in 1970, the school (which had financial problems since the outset) could not afford to rebuild and requested the Texas Legislature for assistance. The Legislature approved opening a branch of the Texas A&M University System the following year; UCC held its final graduating class in 1973, and BGCT sold the campus to the state shortly thereafter, retaining 10 acres to maintain a student religious center.

Originally named Texas A&I University at Corpus Christi, it was later named Corpus Christi State University before joining the Texas A&M University System in 1989 and taking its current name.

=== Presidents ===
	Presidents of TAMUCC	years as president
1	E. S. Hutcherson	(1947–1948)
2	R. M. Cavness	(1948–1951)
3	W. A. Miller	(1952–1965)
4	Joseph H. Clapp	(1966–1968)
5	Leonard L. Holloway	(1968–1969)
6	Kenneth A. Maroney	(1969–1973)
7	Whitney D. Halladay	(1973–1977)
8	Barney Alan Sugg	(1977–1989)
9	Robert R. Furgason	(1990–2004)
10	Flavius C. Killebrew	(2004–2016)
11	Kelly M. Miller	(2017–present)

== Academics ==
Academic rankings

National
- U.S. News & World Report: 395-435
- Washington Monthly: 348

Texas A&M-Corpus Christi offers 33 undergraduate majors, 25 graduate programs, and six doctoral programs through six colleges:

- College of Liberal Arts
- College of Business, accredited by the AACSB.
- College of Education and Human Development
- College of Engineering and Computer Science
- College of Nursing and Health Sciences
- College of Science

The university also includes the School of Arts, Media, and Communication.

== Centers, institutes, and affiliates ==
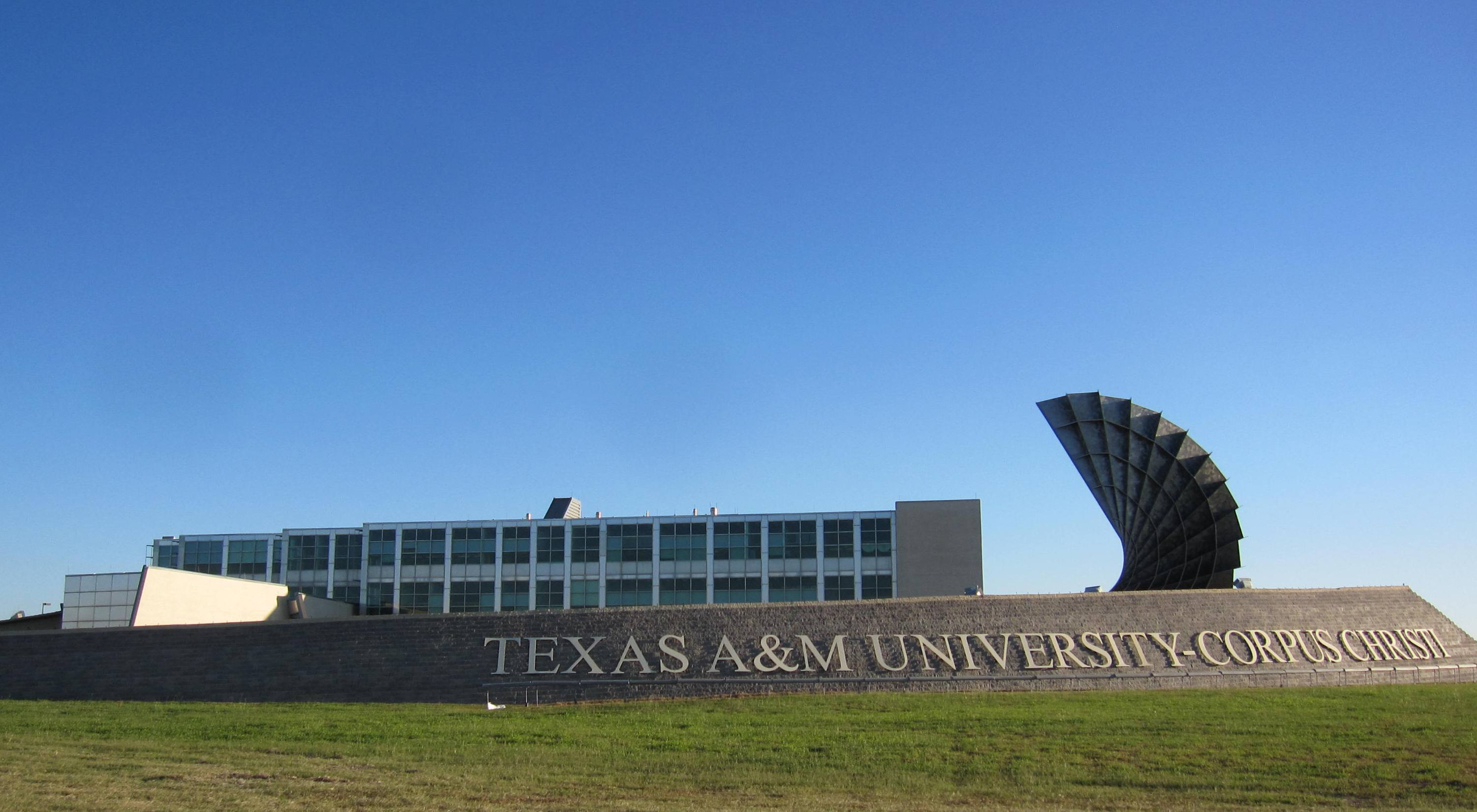
TAMUCC Entrance and Harte Research Institute building

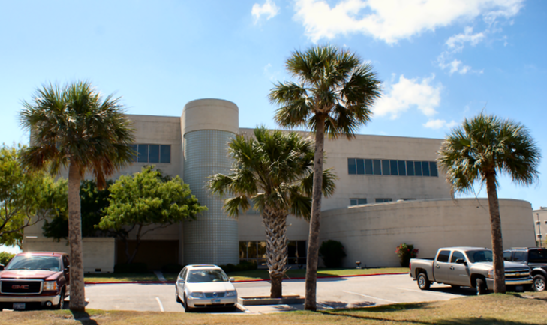
The Carlos Truan Natural Resource Building, opened in 1993, was named in honor of late State Senator C. Truan of Corpus Christi, who helped to obtain funding for the facility.

The Conrad Blucher Institute for Surveying and Science is a research institute dedicated to geospatial science. The institute was founded by an endowment from the Conrad Blucher family. Research by the institute includes the Texas Coastal Ocean Observation Network (a tide monitoring system), Texas Spatial Reference Center research for the Texas Height Modernization, and other geospatial research relating to surveying and mapping.

The Harte Research Institute brings scientists to the campus to strengthen TAMU-CC's research on environmental issues facing the gulf, area wetlands, coastal waterways, and beaches. Other centers on campus conduct research on biodiversity through offshore scientific diving expeditions, and aid in oil spill response, hurricane tracking, and commercial shipping.

Autonomy Research Institute (ARI) is one of the seven unmanned aircraft system test sites in the US, designated by the Federal Aviation Administration in 2014. ARI specializes in research, development, and testing of autonomous systems across air, land, water, and eventually space.

== Student life ==
Undergraduate demographics as of fall 2023
Race and ethnicity	Total
Hispanic	53%
White	33%
Black	4%
Asian	3%
Two or more races	3%
International student	2%
Unknown	1%
Economic diversity
Low-income (Note: The percentage of students who received an income-based federal Pell grant intended for low-income students.)	39%
Affluent (Note: The percentage of students who are a part of the American middle class at the bare minimum.)	61%

=== Student government ===
The Student Government Association at TAMU-CC hosts the officers of the student body. The SGA runs a three-branch system, with the Executive Board consisting of the Student Body Officers, the Legislative Branch consisting of the Student Senate, and the Judicial Branch consisting of the Chief and Associate Justices.

The current legislative branch, or Student Senate, has two underlying groups of senators: general senators, which holds an international senator, a student veteran senator, a housing senator, an athletics senator, disability services senator, and a library senator. The college senators, which holds three senators for each of the seven colleges: Business, Education & Human Development, Liberal Arts, Nursing & Health Sciences, Science & Engineering, Graduate Studies, and University College.

Elections for SGA are held twice a year, once near the close of the spring for all positions and then at the opening of the fall for the freshman senators and remaining vacancies from the spring elections.

=== Publications ===
TAMU-CC has an entirely student-run newspaper, Island Waves. It was first published in 1993, and is, in part, funded through student fees and advertisement sales. Issues are published every Thursday throughout the fall and spring semesters, with three issues printed over the summer.

Islander Magazine is a biannual news publication for Texas A&M University–Corpus Christi, first published in the Fall of 2006.

=== Greek life ===
TAMU-CC is home to three Interfraternity Council Fraternities (IFC): Phi Gamma Delta, Sigma Phi Epsilon, and Sigma Pi. The university has four National Panhellenic Sororities (NPC). Alpha Gamma Delta, Delta Delta Delta, Gamma Phi Beta, and Zeta Tau Alpha. The university also has six Multicultural Greek Council organizations (MGC): Lambda Theta Alpha, Sigma Lambda Gamma, Alpha Kappa Alpha, Alpha Phi Alpha, and Kappa Delta Chi. Greek Life is a growing aspect of the TAMU-CC campus gaining notoriety and size over the years since it began at the university in 1998.

=== Islander Dining Hall ===
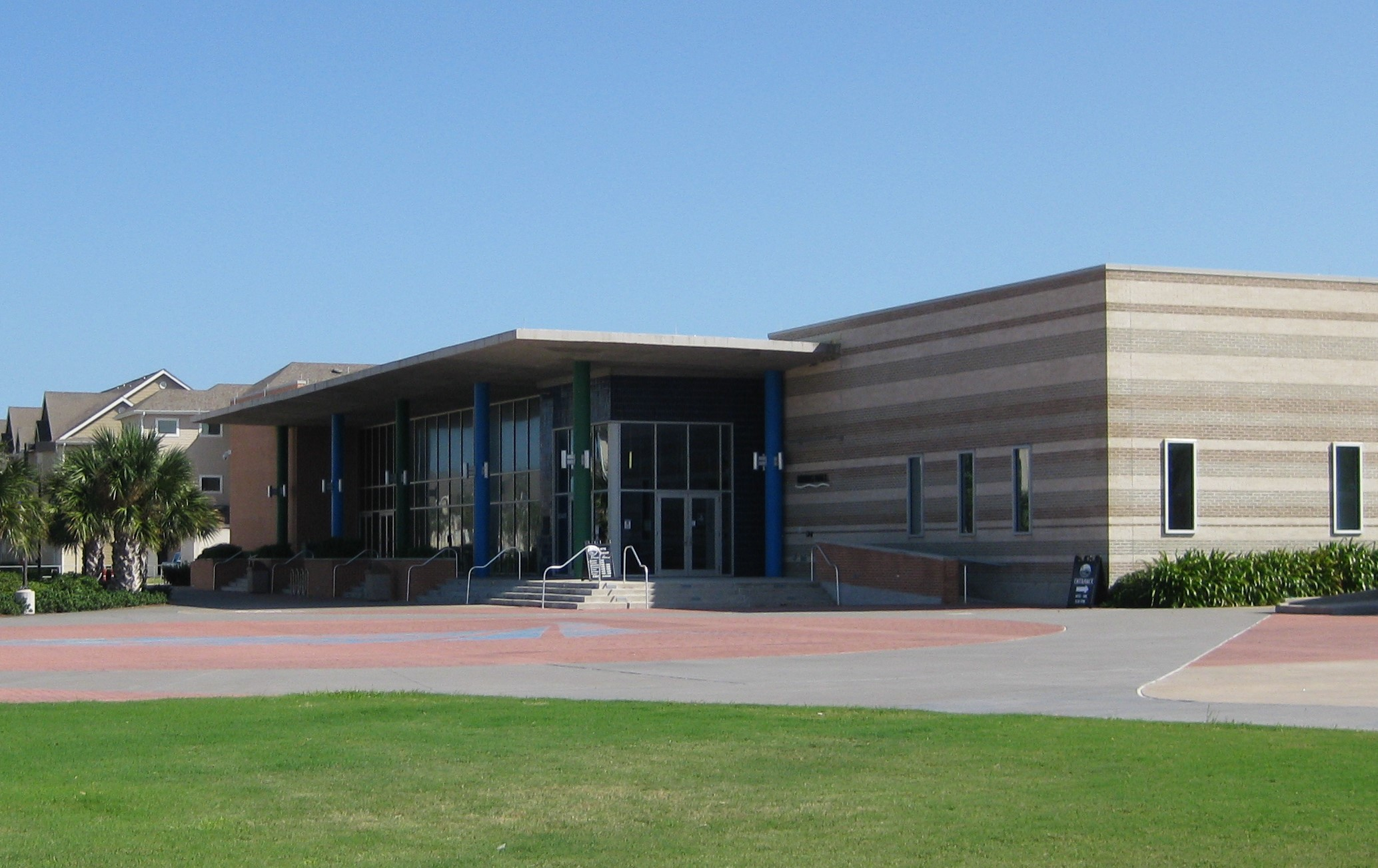
Islander Dining Hall opened in 2014.

Islander Dining Hall has been designated as an Ocean Friendly Restaurant (OFR). It is the second university dining hall in the nation to receive the designation. As part of 400 OFR in the U.S., Islander Dining Hall is working to lower an estimated 5.25 trillion pieces of plastic entering the world's marine ecosystems. Elizabeth Alford, Marketing Manager for the Islander Dining Hall, said of the designation:

"With the university surrounded by Oso Bay and Corpus Christi Bay, it is important that we take the initiative to reduce the amount of plastic and Styrofoam waste that could potentially come from Islander Dining Hall. . . . It is imperative that we use our location as an educational tool for our students. This recognition encourages our community to be stewards of the environment."

Islander Dining Hall has banned the use of Styrofoam, plastic bags, plastic plates, and plastic utensils. Islander Dining Hall also uses reusable food ware for onsite dining, recycles and provides biodegradable coffee cups and to-go plates.

== Athletics ==
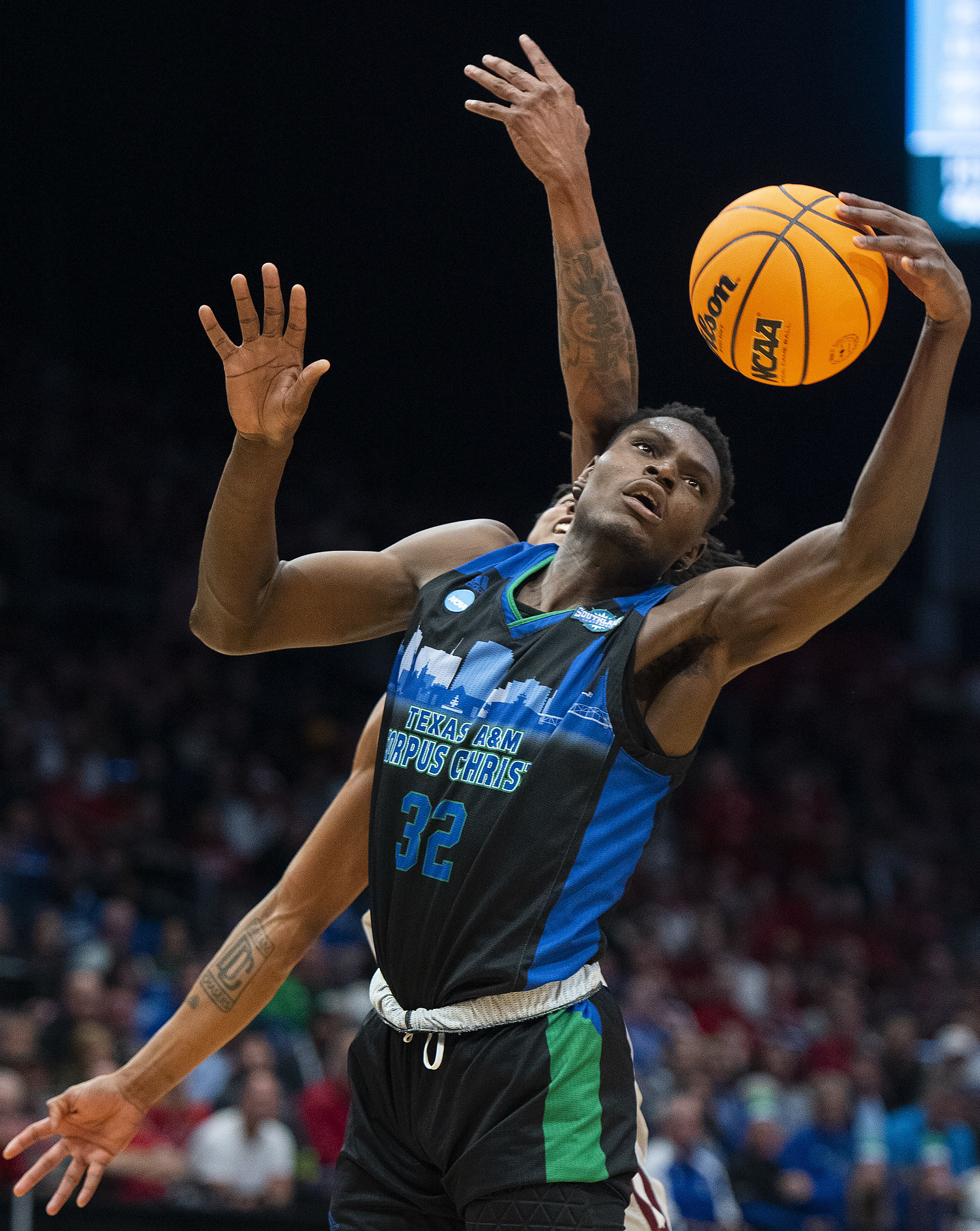
Islanders men's basketball player Stephen Giwa during the 2022 NCAA Division I men's basketball tournament

The Texas A&M–Corpus Christi (TAMUCC) athletic teams are called the Islanders. The university is a member of the Division I level of the National Collegiate Athletic Association (NCAA), primarily competing in the Southland Conference since the 2006–07 academic year. Prior to that, the Islanders had competed as an NCAA Division III Independent from 1999–2000 to 2001–02; as well as an NCAA D-I Independent from 2002–03 to 2005–06.

TAMUCC competes in 14 intercollegiate varsity sports: Men's sports include baseball, basketball, cross country, tennis, and track & field (indoor and outdoor); women's sports include basketball, beach volleyball, cross country, golf, soccer, softball, tennis, track, and field (indoor and outdoor) and volleyball.

=== Nickname/mascot ===
TAMUCC's team nickname, the Islanders, was taken from the institution being located on an island. Their mascot is "Izzy the Islander", a blue figure designed to represent the "coastal lifestyle" of Corpus Christi. He was redesigned in 2022, previously depicting a costumed man with a tiki mask headdress, grass skirt, and spear. Prior to that, the official mascot was "Tarpie" the Tarpon.

=== Men's basketball ===
The TAMUCC Islanders basketball team is coached by Jim Shaw and play their home games at the American Bank Center as well as at the Dugan Wellness Center on the university's campus. They have played in the NCAA tournament three times, most recently in 2023. From 2021 to 2023 the Islanders were coached by Steve Lutz, who would move on to coach at Western Kentucky University after winning 1 regular season and 2 tournament titles with the team.

=== Women's cross country ===
The TAMUCC Islander cross country team is regarded as the most successful sport in school history, as the women's team has won seven of the nine conference titles (more than any other team in the history of Texas universities). In 2009, they scored the highest at the regional meet, with a sixth-place finish. In 2018, under new head coach Brent Ericksen, the Islander women won the Southland Conference title by one point, making the win the smallest margin in conference history.

=== Islanders Spirit Team ===
In 1958, the UCC Athletics consisted of a few sports, including cheerleading. It was one of the dominating sports of campus athletics until 1966. However, the program still continued on in 1973 with a small cheer squad.

As for dance teams, there was a student-led one called TAMUCC Starlettes. They began performing in the 2000s, but they were dissolved in 2003. The dance organization was dissolved until 3 years later. In 2006, the university created the Islanders Dance Team and Spirit Teams. More specifically, Melanie Lowry brought back the teams. While operating as the first coordinator, she was able to make the Spirit Teams eligible for both funding and scholarships.

The current Spirit coordinator is named Ulyana Yazvina. Under her authority both the cheer and dance squads have made a comeback during the 2025-26 season. The cheer team has competed in national collegiate competitions, such as NCA College Nationals. At the 2026 NCA College Nationals, the cheer team won both the Superior Rally Award and Superior Crowd Segment Award. They also placed third in the Spirit Rally competition. The dance squad competes on the national stage at the UDA College Nationals. At the 2026 College Classic, the Division 1 Small Team secured second place for their Home Routine performance. They also placed in both the Game Day and Fight Song categories at UDA. They received second for Game Day, and third for Fight Song.

== Facilities ==
Notable buildings on campus:

- Bay Hall
- Corpus Christi Hall
- Dr. Robert R. Furgason Engineering Building
- Dugan Wellness Center/Island Hall
- Early Childhood Development Center
- Michael and Karen O'Connor Building
- Mary and Jeff Bell Library
- Performing Arts Center
- Tidal Hall
- University Center

== Community engagement ==
Texas A&M University–Corpus Christi operates the Coastal Bend Business Innovation Center as part of the College of Business. The center provides support for new ventures to resident (on-site) and non-resident clients.

The Art Museum of South Texas has been affiliated with the university since 1995. The museum traces its roots to the Centennial Museum founded in 1936 and now occupies an area on Corpus Christi Bay across the channel from the Texas State Aquarium. The Art Museum is one of several attractions that are part of the Sports, Entertainment, and Arts (SEA) district of Corpus Christi.

The university operates the Antonio E. Garcia Arts & Education Center. The center provides programming and classes for the community and particularly for k-12 students and those who are at-risk students.

== Notable people ==
=== Alumni ===
- Marcello Alves, former professional soccer athlete from Brazil.
- Chris Daniels, basketball player
- Robert Gammage, Texas politician
- Paulette Guajardo, politician, mayor of Corpus Christi
- Kim Henkel, screenplay writer, producer and actor
- Cassandra Jean, actress, model, and beauty pageant
- Kevin Palmer, basketball player
- Sarah Pauly, softball player
- Giuliana Poletti, Paraguayan beach volleyball player
- Raul Torres, Texas politician
- Larry D. Wyche, United States Army Lieutenant General

=== Notable faculty ===
- Elliot Chenaux
- Colleen Fitzgerald
- Gary Jeffress
- Robert S. Nelsen

== Photo gallery ==
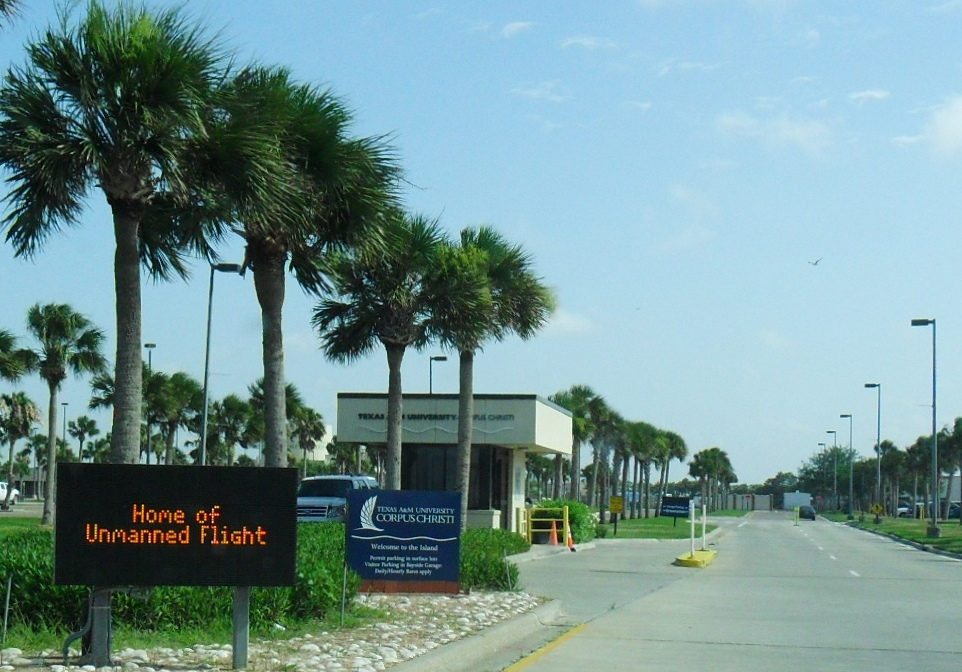

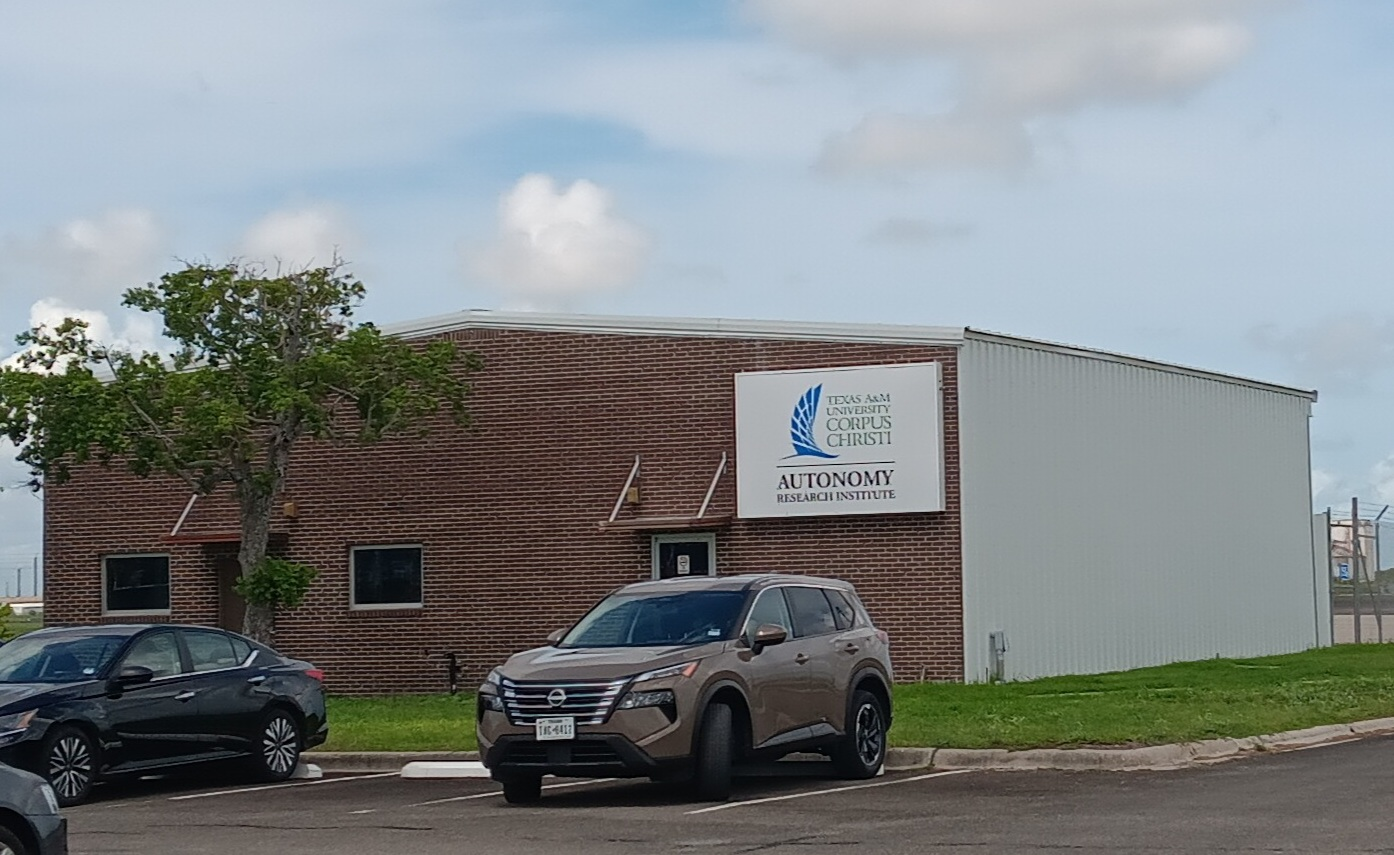

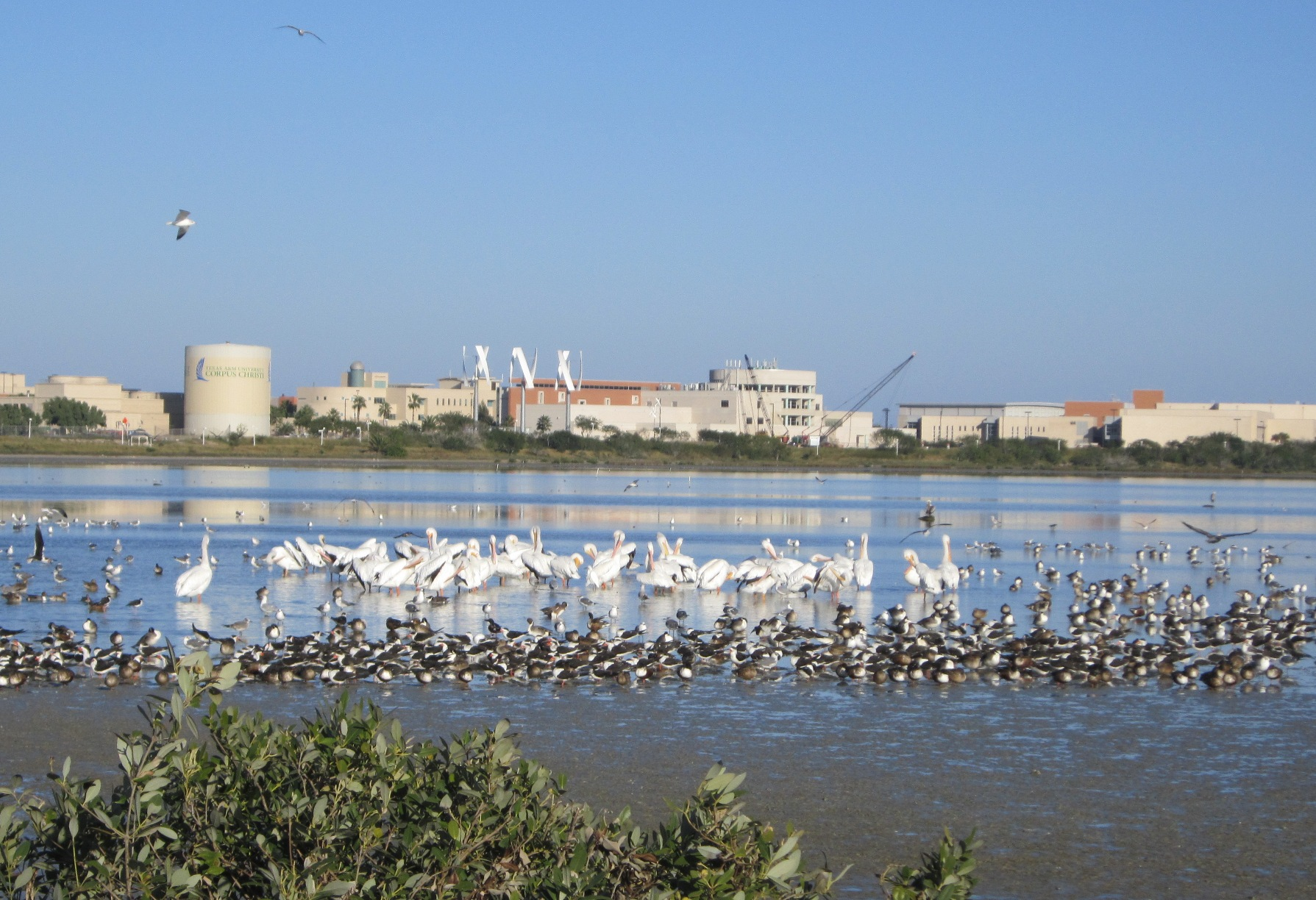

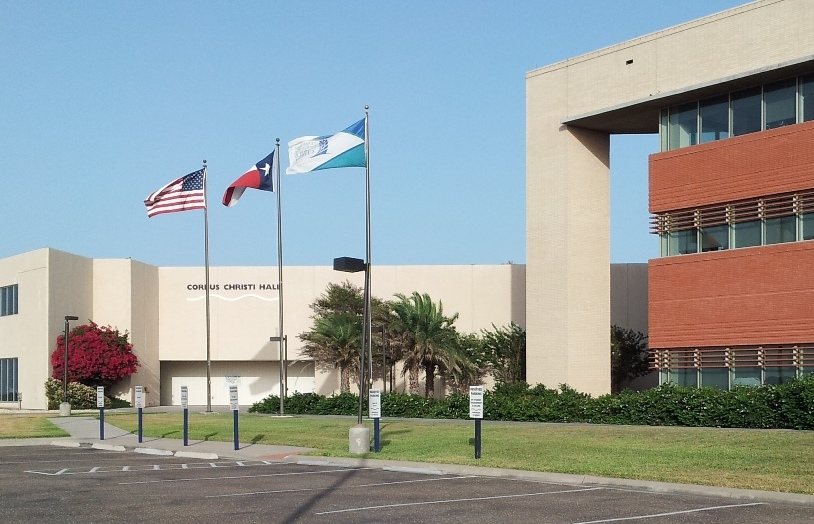

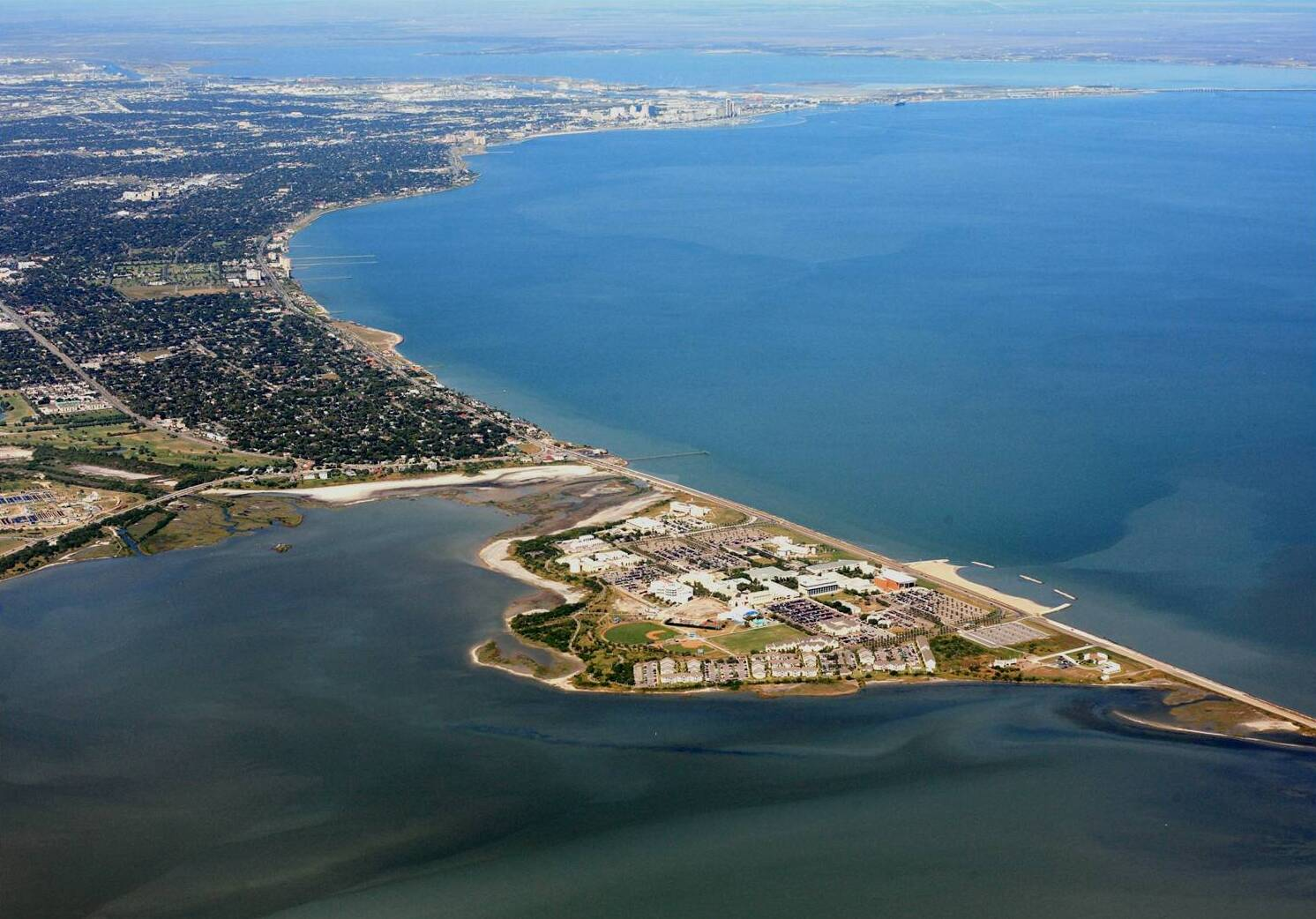

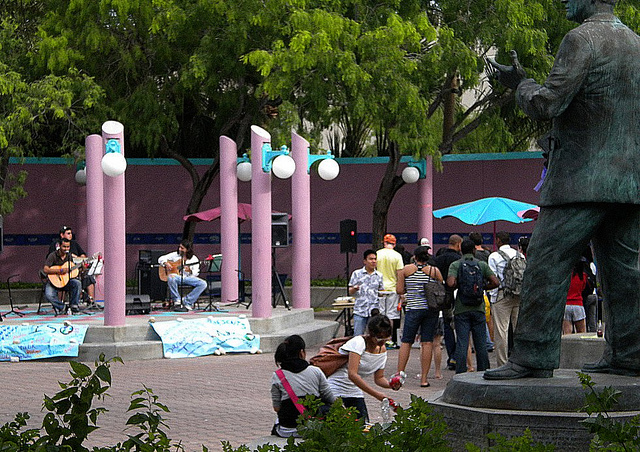

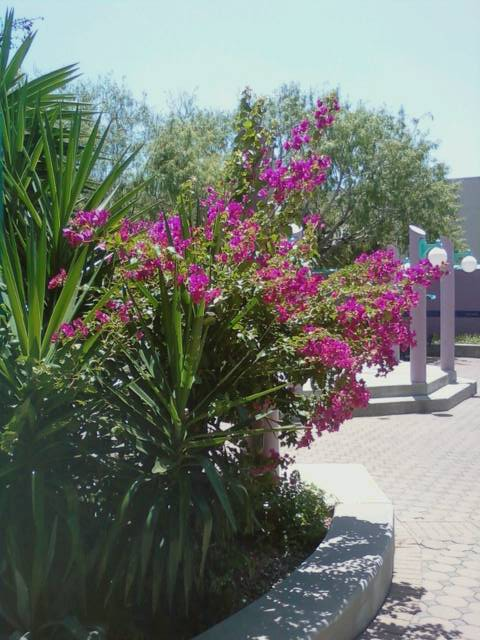

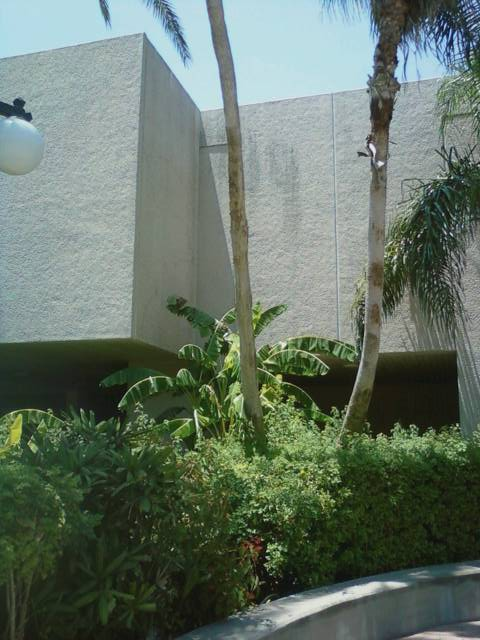

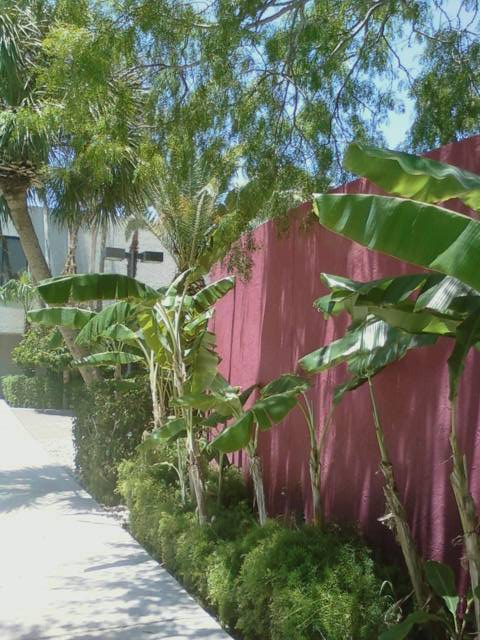

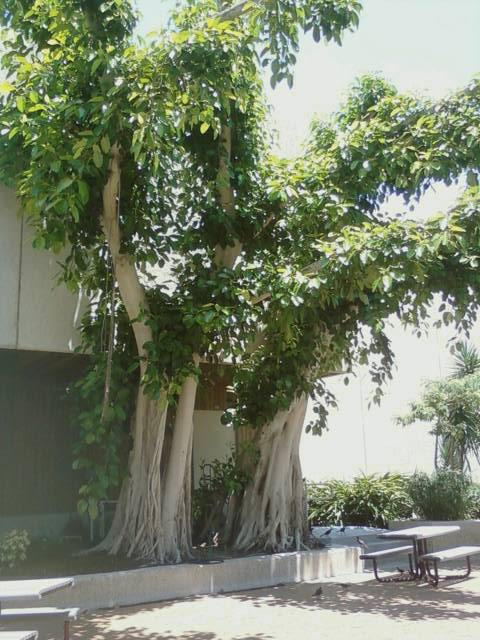

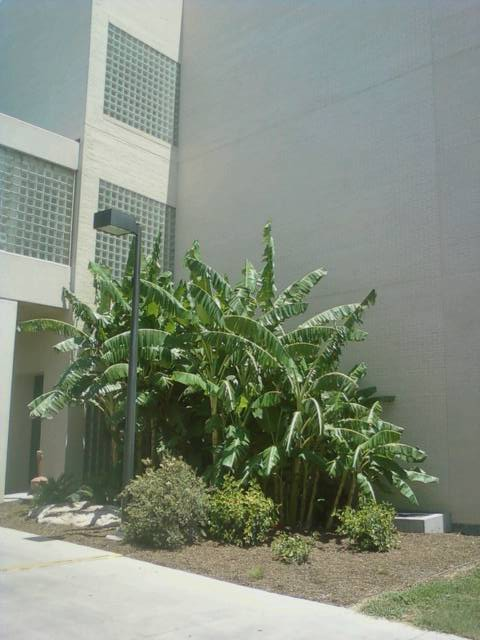

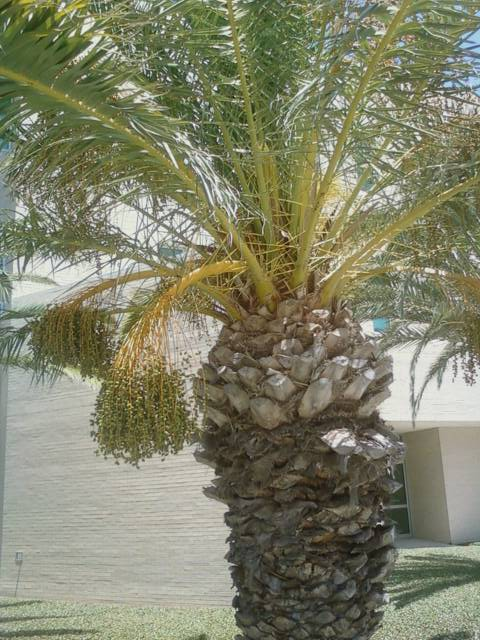

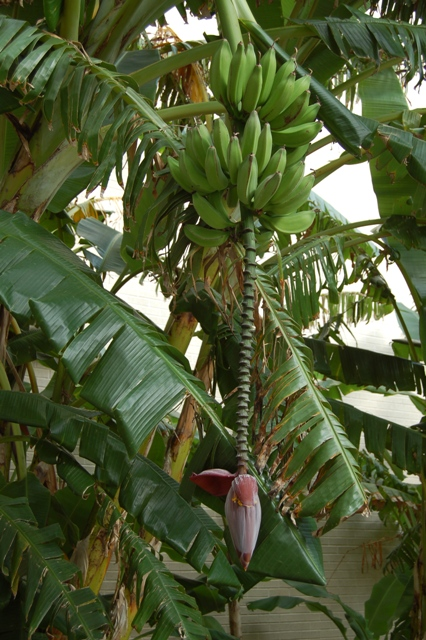

== See also ==
- Hispanic-serving institution
- Harte Research Institute
- List of colleges and universities in Texas
- Texas A&M–Corpus Christi Islanders
- Texas A&M University System
