= Donna Lewis Friess =

American author and children's rights activist

- Born: January 16, 1943 (age 83); Los Angeles, California, U.S.
- Occupations: Professor, author, activist
- Writing career
- Subject: Child abuse prevention

Donna Lewis Friess (born January 16, 1943) is an American author and activist for children's rights.

== Early life and education ==
Donna Jean Lewis Friess was born in Los Angeles, California. Her father, Raymond W. Lewis, Jr., was an aerospace designer and her mother, Dorothy Borwick Lewis McIntyre a recreation director. As a child victim of incest at her father's hands, she sought to get away from her father's control as soon as she was able. She attended Santa Monica City College and was awarded an academic scholarship to the University of Southern California, where she received her bachelor's degree in communication. She moved into the Alpha Gamma Delta house which she states was "the beginning of the rest of [her] life." She earned her Bachelor of Arts Degree in 1964, then moved to Orange County.

Friess enrolled in a doctoral program in psychology at the United States International University in San Diego, California, (now Alliant University) and received her doctoral degree of philosophy in psychology in June 1993.

== Career ==
In 1966, Friess began her full-time career as a college professor at Cypress College where she remained for 44 years, until her retirement in December 2010.

In 1989, Friess' sister and niece learned that a four year old family member was being molested by Friess' father. A 15-month-long court trial took place in Santa Monica, California Superior Court, resulting in a guilty verdict. In 1994, Friess participated in Governor Pete Wilson's two-day Crime Summit and was invited to attend the bill signings of new laws to protect women and children. One such law was the "Chemical Castration bill," calling for the legal use of the drug Depo-Provera, on paroled repeat sex offenders in order to decrease their sexual desire. That bill was signed into law on September 17, 1996.

Reporter Lynn Smith of the Los Angeles Times published a comprehensive account of the court trial and the family's abuse which was released as a cover story for the Los Angeles Times Magazine, August 4, 1991.

Friess' autobiography, Cry the Darkness: One Woman's Triumph over the Tragedy of Incest, was released in 1993. The media interest led to Friess being asked to speak at survivors' events and before mental health organizations. By 1998, Cry the Darkness had been published in six more languages.

In 2006, Friess was an appointee by California Governor Arnold Schwarzenegger to serve on an advisory council regarding victim sensitive issues for the California Department of Corrections and Rehabilitation. Friess served as the California Co-Chairperson for the successful passage of the first federal victim's rights bill which was signed by President George W. Bush in 2004. Friess has continued to serve on the Justice Department's Office of Victims Affairs Technical Training and Advisory Council since 2004.

Friess was a founding board member for Laura's House, a shelter for victims of domestic violence in California, 1994, and Mothers Against Child Sexual Abuse in 1995. She was a member of the American Coalition Against Child Abuse, One Voice, California Psychological Association, and Child Abuse Listening and Mediation of Santa Barbara. She served on the WomanSage board of directors from 2011 to 2016.

Retired from Cypress College December 10, 2021, Dr. Friess soon began volunteering through the City of San Juan Capistrano as a Loss of a Loved One Support Group Leader which she did for nine years. Donna has volunteered as a docent at Mission San Juan Capistrano since 2017.Donna is a frequent guest on podcasts, for historical societies, and Daughters of the American Revolution where she is serves as second Vice Regent for the San Clemente Chapter of the DAR. Her recent podcast on Hey Boomer can be found on Youtube Monday, November 13, 2023.

== Awards and honors ==
Writing awards for Cry the Darkness include: University of Irvine, Friends of the Library Author's Award, 1996, Winner - Indie Excellence Award 2014; and Honorable Mention in Paris International Book Festival, 2014.

In 2009 Dr Donna Friess was named Orange County Teacher of the Year by Cypress College. She was nominated for the American President's Service Award in 1996. Though she did not receive the award, the nomination in itself was an honor. Donna was appointed to the U.S. Justice Department's Office for Victims of Crime: technical Training and Advisory Council. She has sat on that board for the past 15 years.

Dr. Friess was named to the City of San Juan Capistrano's Wall of Recognition on November 7, 2023. Capistrano Dispatch, November 14, 2023.'Council Approves List of 2023 Inductees for Wall of Recognition," Shawn Raymundo. "Friess is a former college professor and local author who in 2018 published a 250 page book, Capistrano Trails: Ride for the Brand,, in 2020 she published Growing Up Venice: Parallel Universes recalling her experiences growing up in the California beach town of Venice. For nearly a decade, Friess facilitated a grief and support group for those who have lost a loved one. She also volunteers as a docent for the last seven years at the Mission where she teaches groups of kids."

Donna with her husband of 59 years, Ken were the subject of the Cover Story in Neighbors of San Juan Capistrano November 2023 published by Best Version Media. Publisher Linda Hakim. This magazine is mailed to every home in the city of San Juan Capistrano,

== Personal life ==
Friess married Kenneth Friess, who was active in local politics in historic San Juan Capistrano becoming a four term mayor. They had three children.

== Publications ==
- Women Leaders of the Movement to Stop Child Sexual Abuse. Campus: Dissertation. 1993.
- Cry the Darkness: One Woman's Triumph over the Tragedy of Incest, Health Communications, FL. 1993.
- Just Between Us: A Guide to Healing. HIH Publishing, 1995. (out of print)
- Whispering Waters: Historic Weesha and the Settling of, HIH Publishing, CA.1 998.
- A Chronicle of Historic Weesha and the . HIH Publishing, CA. 2000.
- Circle of Love: A Guide to Successful Relationships, 3rd Ed., HIH Publishing, CA. 2008
- One Hundred Years of Weesha: Centennial 2010. HIH Publishing, CA. 2010.
- Cherish the Light: One Woman's Journey from Darkness to Light. (Sequel to Cry the Darkness.) HIH Publishing, CA. 2013.
- The Unraveling of Shelby Forrest. A novel. HIH Publishing, CA 2014.
- Capistrano Trails: Ride for the Brand. HIH Publishing, CA. 2018.- Oral History.
- Growing Up Venice: Parallel Universe. HIH Publishing, CA 2000, Narrative non-fiction.
- The Forgotten Apple Tree. HIH Publishing. Ca. 2023. A history of Weesha as a fairy tale. Newspaper Publications
- The Capistrano Dispatch. February 24, 2023. Story by Donna Friess "Ysidora Forster:" Heroic Matriarch of Old San Juan. https://www.thecapistranodispatch.com
- The Capistrano Dispatch. April 14–17, 2023. San Juan Capistrano's Equestrian Story Goes Back 190,000 Years. Story by Donna Friess. https://www.thecapistranodispatch.com
