= Kelly M. Miller =

American academic

Kelly Miller

11th President of Texas A&M University–Corpus Christi
- Incumbent
- Assumed office August 2017
- Preceded by: Flavius C. Killebrew

Personal details
- Born: Kelly Marie Miller Altoona, Pennsylvania, U.S.
- Children: 1
- Education: University of Pittsburgh (BS); Pennsylvania State University (MS, PhD)

Kelly Marie Miller is an American academic. Since August 2017, she has served as the 11th president of Texas A&M University–Corpus Christi (TAMUCC). She is the first female president of the university.

== Early life and education ==
Kelly Marie Miller was born in Altoona, Pennsylvania, to a welder father and a stay-at-home mother who was formerly a preschool teacher. In 1989, she became the first person in her family to attend a university, graduating from the University of Pittsburgh as a first-generation college student. While at the University of Pittsburgh, she joined the university's chapter of Alpha Gamma Delta. She earned her Ph.D. in speech communication from Pennsylvania State University in 1994, after earning a master's degree in 1992.

== Academic career ==
Miller joined the staff of Texas A&M University–Corpus Christi (TAMUCC) after earning her doctorate. She taught classes in communication as the youngest full-time faculty member at age 26, teaching for 16 years. Aside from communication, her courses covered business and leadership. At TAMUCC she has held the positions of Provost and Vice President for Academic Affairs, Dean of the College of Liberal Arts; Director of the School of Arts, Media & Communication; and Chair for the Department of Communication and Theatre.

In January 2017, Miller became interim president of TAMUCC, being the sole finalist for president in June of that year. The Texas A&M University System board of regents declared her president after a brief meeting on June 19, 2017. As president, Miller states two of her goals are to increase student retention and to grow the university academically and physically. Shortly after her inauguration as president she was involved in a dispute with student activists who objected to the anonymous dissemination of white supremacist flyers on campus. The administration reported the case to the district attorney's office, and Miller said in a statement, "[This is the] price we pay for our precious right to freedom of speech" and, "Personally, I choose not to be drawn into this divisiveness". In December 2019, she oversaw the university's purchase of a building in downtown Corpus Christi, Texas, noting needs for new campus space due to growth and for revitalization of the area.

== Other activities ==
Outside of TAMUCC, Miller has worked as a consultant and gives presentations on various subjects. She has served on the board of the Art Museum of South Texas, the Corpus Christi Symphony Orchestra, and the Harbor Playhouse.

== Selected bibliography ==
=== Books ===
- Quintanilla, Kelly M.; Wahl, Shawn T. (2010). Business and Professional Communication: KEYS for Workplace Excellence. Sage Publications. ISBN 9781412964722.

=== Papers ===
- Hansen, Alan Dale; Quintanilla, Kelly Miller (November 2011). "It's like a Mexican Bingo". Journal of Intercultural Communication. 11 (27): 1–15. doi:10.36923/jicc.v11i3.535.
