= Height Modernization =

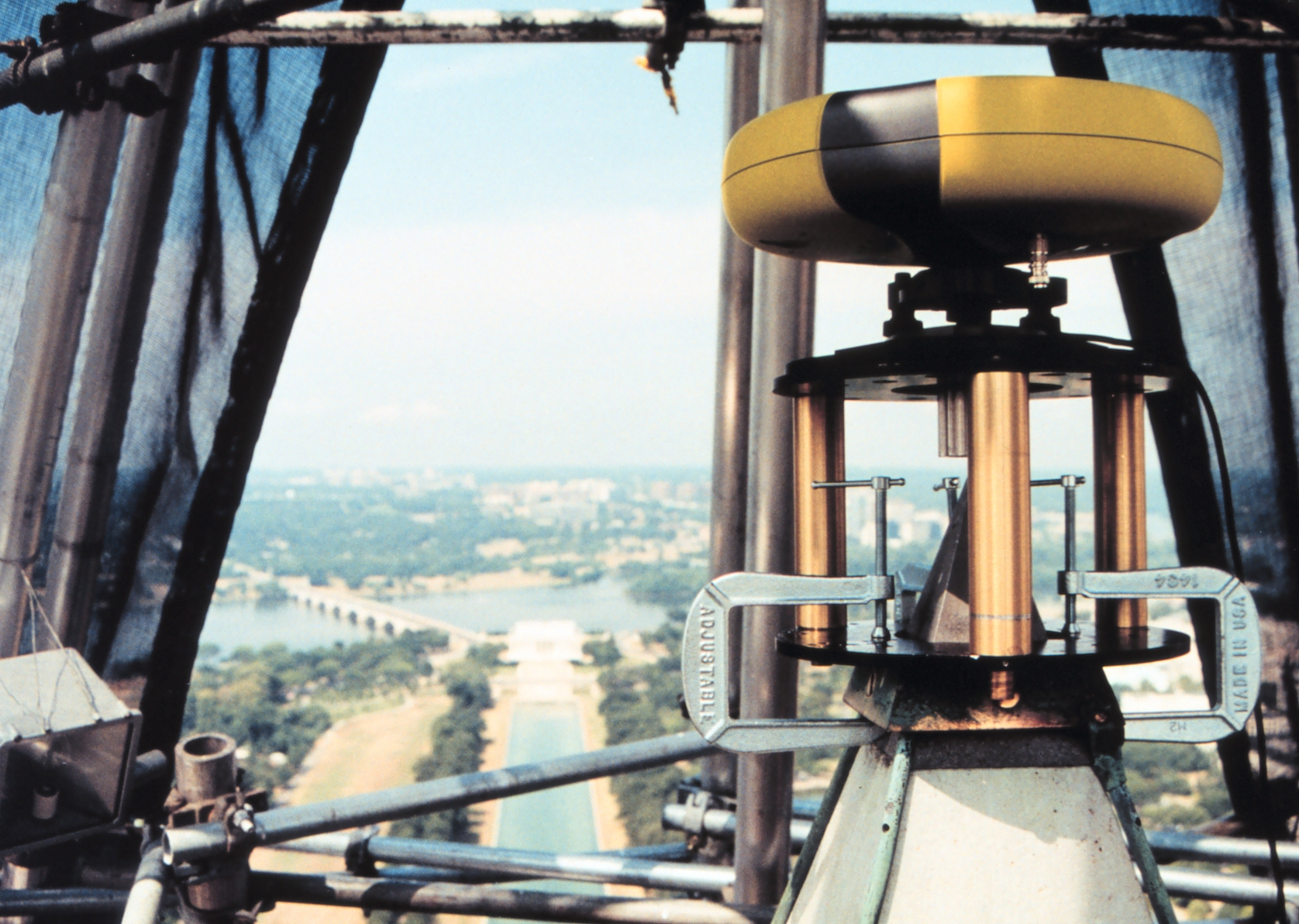
A device placed on top of the Washington Monument to measure the height as part of a Height Modernization project in 1999

Height Modernization is the name of a series of state-by-state programs recently begun by the United States' National Geodetic Survey, a division of the National Oceanic and Atmospheric Administration. The goal of each state program is to place GPS base stations at various locations within each participating state to measure topographic changes in the directions of latitude and longitude caused by subsidence or earthquakes, as well as to measure changes in height (elevation).
