= Gary Jeffress =

American academic

Dr. Gary Jeffress is a retired research professor of Geographic Information Science in the Department of Computing and Mathematical Sciences of Texas A&M University-Corpus Christi.

He is the former director of the Conrad Blucher Institute for Surveying and Science retiring from the position at the end of 2018. He is the former president of the Texas Society of Professional Surveyors (1999) and Geographic and Land Information Society (2005).

== Education ==
He attended Hurlstone Agricultural High School, Glenfield, New South Wales, Australia, graduating in 1971. He received his Bachelor of Surveying, School of Surveying, University of New South Wales, Australia, in 1978 and his Master of Surveying Science from the same school in 1987. He received a Ph.D. (Surveying Engineering) with a minor in Economics, from the Department of Surveying Engineering at the University of Maine in 1991

== Professional and academic life ==
He is a registered professional land surveyor in Texas, Maine, and Australia. Jeffress has been one of the original co-principal investigators of the Texas Coastal Ocean Observation Network since 1991, and held the Blucher Chair of Excellence in Surveying from 1990 to 1991. He has held teaching positions in Australia and the US, and has taught short courses in Haiti.

Jeffress continues to collect and analyze geographic data and information for land management and development. His research interests incorporate GIS and digital surveying applications in environmental management, land titling, and land administration. Jeffress is involved in promoting surveying and GIS education. He organized and coordinated the 2006 GLIS GIS Competition for high school students, sponsored by the Environmental Systems Research Institute (ESRI).
