= Edith MacConnel Hickok =

Founder of Alpha Gamma Delta

Edith MacConnel Hickok was born in 1883 in Harford, Pennsylvania.

She entered Syracuse University as a freshman in 1903. There, she was one of the founding members of the sorority Alpha Gamma Delta. She suffered an ice injury in April 1904 that required her to spend the founding year in the hospital. She and Georgia Dickover wrote the "Initiation Song" in the fall.

She was also the mother of the first Alpha Gam baby.

== See also ==
- Sorority
