= Texas International Education Consortium =

The Texas International Education Consortium (TIEC) is an international, private, non-profit corporation located in Austin, Texas. Founded in 1985, it works with 32 public universities in Texas on a variety of international projects, including founding new universities, developing university programs, creating cooperation programs between international universities, and facilitating K-12 education.
