= Alpha Gamma Delta =

North American college women's fraternity

- ΑΓΔ
- Founded: May 30, 1904; 122 years ago Syracuse University
- Type: Social
- Affiliation: NPC
- Status: Active
- Scope: North America
- Motto: "Loving. Leading. Lasting"
- Slogan: Inspire the Woman. Impact the World.
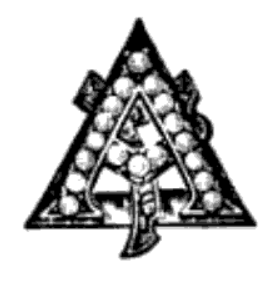
- Member badge
- Colors: Red, Buff, and Green
- Flower: Red and buff roses with green asparagus plumosa fern
- Jewel: Pearl
- Mascot: Squirrel
- Publication: The Quarterly
- Philanthropy: The Alpha Gamma Delta Foundation, Fighting Hunger
- Chapters: 119 (active)
- Members: 201,000+ lifetime
- Headquarters: PO Box 80005; Indianapolis, Indiana 46280; United States
- Website: alphagammadelta.org

Alpha Gamma Delta (ΑΓΔ), also known as Alpha Gam, is an international women's fraternity and social organization. It was founded in 1904 at Syracuse University in Syracuse, New York. It is the youngest member of the Syracuse Triad of North American social sororities that also includes Alpha Phi (1872) and Gamma Phi Beta (1874).

Since its founding, Alpha Gamma Delta has initiated over 201,000 members and installed 200 collegiate chapters and more than 250 alumnae groups in the United States and Canada. Its current philanthropic initiative is a fight against hunger, partnered with the nonprofit organizations Feeding America and Meals on Wheels. Alpha Gamma Delta is a member of the National Panhellenic Conference. Its international headquarters is located in Indianapolis, Indiana.

== History ==
=== Founding ===
In 1904, efforts to introduce a new women's fraternity at Syracuse University began with eleven women and Dr. Wellesley Perry Coddington, a professor at the university who encouraged his students to form new fraternities and was instrumental in the early development of Alpha Gamma Delta. In May of that year, the founding women chose the fraternity's colors, motto, and badge.

Alpha Gamma Delta was officially founded on May 30, 1904, at Dr. Coddington's home with eleven founders, including Estelle Shepard Beswick, Emily Helen Butterfield, Georgia Otis Chipman, Georgia Alberta Dickover, Ethel Evelyn Brown Distin, Grace Mosher Harter, Edith MacConnell Hickok, Flora Knight Mayer, Jennie Titus Smith Morris, Mary Louise Snider, and Marguerite Shepard. At the founding, its constitution and bylaws were read and adopted and suggestions for a ritual were made. Titus was elected as the first president.

Unlike many other groups founded at the time, Alpha Gamma Delta was founded as a US-wide women's fraternity rather than a local fraternity or a literary or professional society, also refusing an offer to join one of the other two US-wide women's fraternities on campus. The organization's official designation as a fraternity rather than a sorority derives from an early advisor who noted that soror is a Latin word with no connection to the Greek traditions cited by similar collegiate social groups. Many other Greek-letter organizations for women also refer to themselves as fraternities, although in the collective sense, they are generally called sororities.

=== Expansion and first philanthropies ===
Alpha Gamma Delta expanded to an unusual extent during its early years; its Beta chapter was founded at the University of Wisconsin–Madison in 1905, and by 1909, its 9th chapter—Iota—was founded at the University of Washington. The fraternity's first National Conference was held in 1907, and two years later it joined the National Panhellenic Conference. Alpha Gamma Delta began international expansion in 1919 with the chartering of its Tau chapter at the University of Toronto. The fraternity held its annual meeting at the International Convention and adopted an international philanthropy project.

The 1910s and 1920s saw the beginning of the fraternity centralizing its philanthropic objectives toward single causes. Instead of hosting its sixth annual National Convention, the fraternity's national president canceled the meeting and asked chapters to donate their $50 fees to war relief efforts. Many chapters adopted war orphans or made garments, beginning the fraternity's timeline of organized charitable activity. During World War I, the fraternity supported the American Red Cross and various war relief efforts. This service continued during World War II. In 1920, the fraternity created its first official philanthropy by starting a summer camp for underprivileged children in Jackson, Michigan, which expanded into Wellington, Ontario. These camps hosted more than 7,000 children and ran for 27 years.

In 1947, Alpha Gamma Delta's primary philanthropic activities shifted from volunteering with underprivileged children to sponsoring counselors for the National Society for Crippled Children and Adults. That year, the fraternity held its first International Convention outside the United States, in Banff, Alberta. By 1949, the fraternity had installed 60 chapters and had initiated 20,840 members. In 1959, at the organization's 22nd International Convention, Theta Sigma Upsilon merged with Alpha Gamma Delta and added 19 chapters to the latter's roster.

=== Organizational and philanthropic changes ===
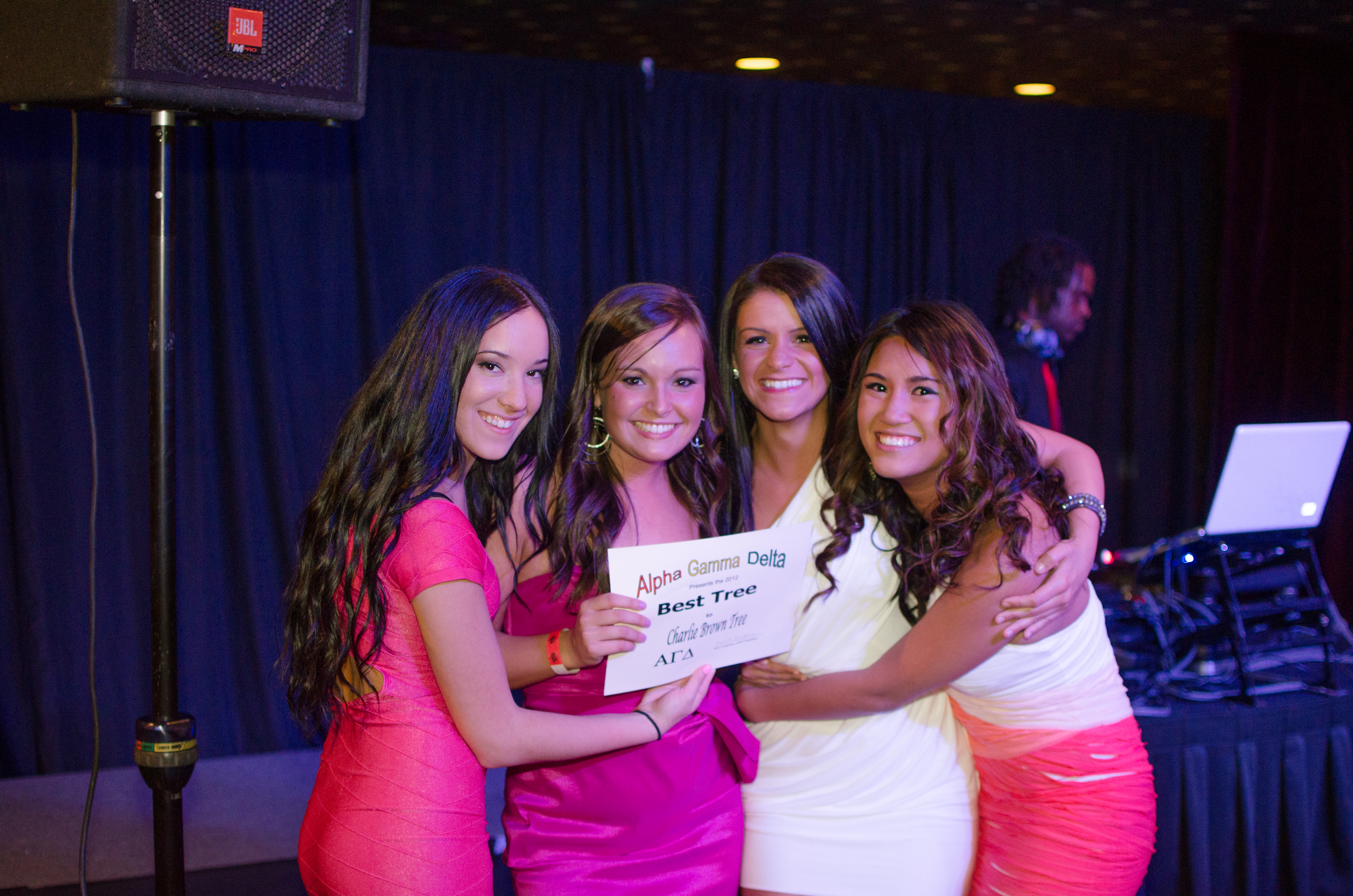
Members of Alpha Gamma Delta at a sorority formal in April 2012.

During and after the 1960s, the organization underwent restructuring, in which it created a separate branch to manage its philanthropic sponsorships and run programs for its members. A separate foundation, originally called the Founders Memorial Foundation, was established in 1962 to handle fundraising; it was later renamed the Alpha Gamma Delta Foundation. This Foundation managed the funds raised by collegiate and alumnae chapters via activities and by direct donations to the foundation. In 1979, the fraternity partnered with the Juvenile Diabetes Foundation and again changed its primary philanthropic focus, which would later expand in 1991 to diabetes treatment and research.

Alpha Gamma Delta celebrated its centennial anniversary during its 2004 International Convention.

In the 2010s, Alpha Gamma Delta continued to change and restructure, creating a separate branch to manage its collegiate housing and again changing its service and philanthropy programs. The fraternity founded its Fraternity Housing Corporation in 2010 to provide local chapters with a national property management and funding option; in 2021, circa 100 out of 125 active chapters are managed under this corporation. The fraternity partnered with Feeding America and Meals on Wheels in 2017 and now focuses its community service and fundraising initiatives towards fighting hunger.

Alpha Gamma Delta gives back to the community through community service efforts. In 2016, they launched their first International Week of Service, where members from all over North America participate in local community service initiatives. Members volunteer their time at humane societies, retirement communities, local clean-up services, and many more. By volunteering together during the Week of Service, they can impact their communities.

== Symbols ==
Alpha Gamma Delta's motto is "Loving, Leading, Lasting". The armorial bearings of the fraternity were designed by founding member Emily Helen Butterfield in 1906. Its colors are red, buff, and green. Its flowers are red and buff roses and green asparagus plusmosa ferns. Its jewel is the pearl.

The fraternity's founders designed a badge, but changed to a new design submitted by jeweler Mr. J. F. Newman in the following months. The badge features a monogram of the Greek letters Δ, Γ, and Α, with the latter set in pearls; some variations include diamond on the other two letters. Members may attach one of several honors chains to their badges if they have received the appropriate honor. The sorority's new member's badge pin is a shield in red, buff, and green enamel.

In 1915, Gamma chapter at Wesleyan University chose the mascot, a squirrel, and named it Skiouros, with the following explanation: "...[S]ome [members] sought a mascot to symbolize the characteristics of the colors and progress of Alpha Gamma Delta ... the little squirrel, a typical frequenter of autumn haunts, was chosen as the mascot. Our little friend, we find, is also nimble and agile—he leaps from branch to branch and [symbolizes] the spirit that never dies, the spirit of energetic alertness and progress."

The sorority's publication is Alpha Gamma Delta Quarterly.

== Activities ==
=== Local activities ===
The fraternity provides various social, academic, leadership, and community service opportunities for collegiate members and alumnae. Throughout the organization's history, it has sponsored charities and causes via grants, scholarships, and volunteer hours. Its current philanthropic initiative is a fight against hunger partnered with the nonprofit organizations Feeding America and Meals on Wheels.

Collegiate members have chapter meetings, philanthropy events, and chapter leadership opportunities. Active membership involves programming with the Epsilon Pi Journey. Collegiate and alumnae members participate in fundraising activities for the Alpha Gamma Delta Foundation and volunteer with and raise funds for food-based organizations in local communities, including Feeding America and Meals on Wheels. Chapters plan their local events, which include fundraisers and galas.

Chapters also plan social events such as formals and mixers with fraternities, host sisterhood activities, and reunions, and participate in charity-related events. As for academics, each chapter must maintain a 2.9 average GPA to remain in good standing with the national organization. The fraternity has scholastic recognition and programs for individuals who maintain a GPA above 3.14 and for chapters averaging from 3.14 to 3.5 and higher.

Alpha Gamma Delta created an annual internal celebration called International Reunion Day in 1936, as many of its collegiate chapters could not celebrate the organization's Founder's Day on May 30 due to university vacation closures or final exams held on that day. Collegiate and alumnae chapters were—and still are—encouraged to meet on the third Saturday of April instead.

=== Alpha Gamma Delta Foundation ===
Alpha Gamma Delta participates in philanthropy through donations made through a separate arm, the Alpha Gamma Delta Foundation. Created in 1962, the Foundation provides grants to organizations and individuals in the U.S. and Canada who are involved in fields related to certain causes. The Foundation currently and historically awards scholarships and grants, funds wellness programs, and provides leadership training and other courses.

Since 2017, the fraternity's philanthropic objective has been to fight hunger, and it currently works with Feeding America and Meals on Wheels America. Its "Full Plates. Hearts. Minds" campaign provides meals for hungry people and creates awareness of food insecurity.

== Membership ==
According to Alpha Gamma Delta, the fraternity has an initiated member base of over 201,000 and 119 active chapters. As with all National Panhellenic Conference (NPC) sororities, women may join Alpha Gamma Delta if they are undergraduates at a university with an active chapter from which they receive a membership offer. Prospective members must meet the fraternity's national minimum GPA requirement (2.5/4.0) as well as the chapter's requirement. Alternatively, women past college age may be invited or may apply to join via alumnae initiation if they are not already a member of another NPC sorority. Due to NPC agreements, no woman who has been initiated into another NPC sorority may join another one, although no NPC member is restricted from joining professional or service Greek-letter organizations.

Alumnae, in good standing, may join one of 250+ alumnae clubs in North America.

== Governance ==
The fraternity's international headquarters is located in Indianapolis, Indiana. International Headquarters is the governing body for all members—undergraduate, and alumnae—and is headed by an International President. The International Headquarters calls an annual meeting of chapter presidents and any alumnae or collegiate members who wish to attend. As chapters expanded early in the 20th century, Alpha Gamma Delta established fraternity provinces organized by geographic region; these have directors who lead each province and represent them to the International Headquarters.

Individual collegiate chapters follow a standardized leadership structure; they have an elected executive board consisting of a president and several vice presidents with different responsibilities. Alumnae often act as advisors or volunteers for a nearby collegiate chapter.

In 1982, the fraternity launched an annual leadership program, the Leadership Conference, to provide its members with leadership education. However, after continual requests for the program to speak at conferences, present at events, or run corporate retreats, this program branched into an organization of its own, the Leadership Institute, which now runs around sixty programs to address women's leadership, both inside and outside of workplaces and careers. Alpha Gam also hosts an annual academy for collegiate officers and biannual academies for chapter officers and its volunteer service team.

=== Fraternity Housing Corporation ===
The Alpha Gamma Delta Fraternity Housing Corporation (FHC) is a 501(c)(7) organization formed in 2010 to provide student housing for the fraternity's undergraduate members. Currently, the FHC provides property management services to about 100 collegiate chapters and about 100 staff members in the headquarters office and local US chapters. Outside of housing, the FHC manages meal services for the members of the fraternity. It reported assets of US$78 million in 2019.

== Chapters ==
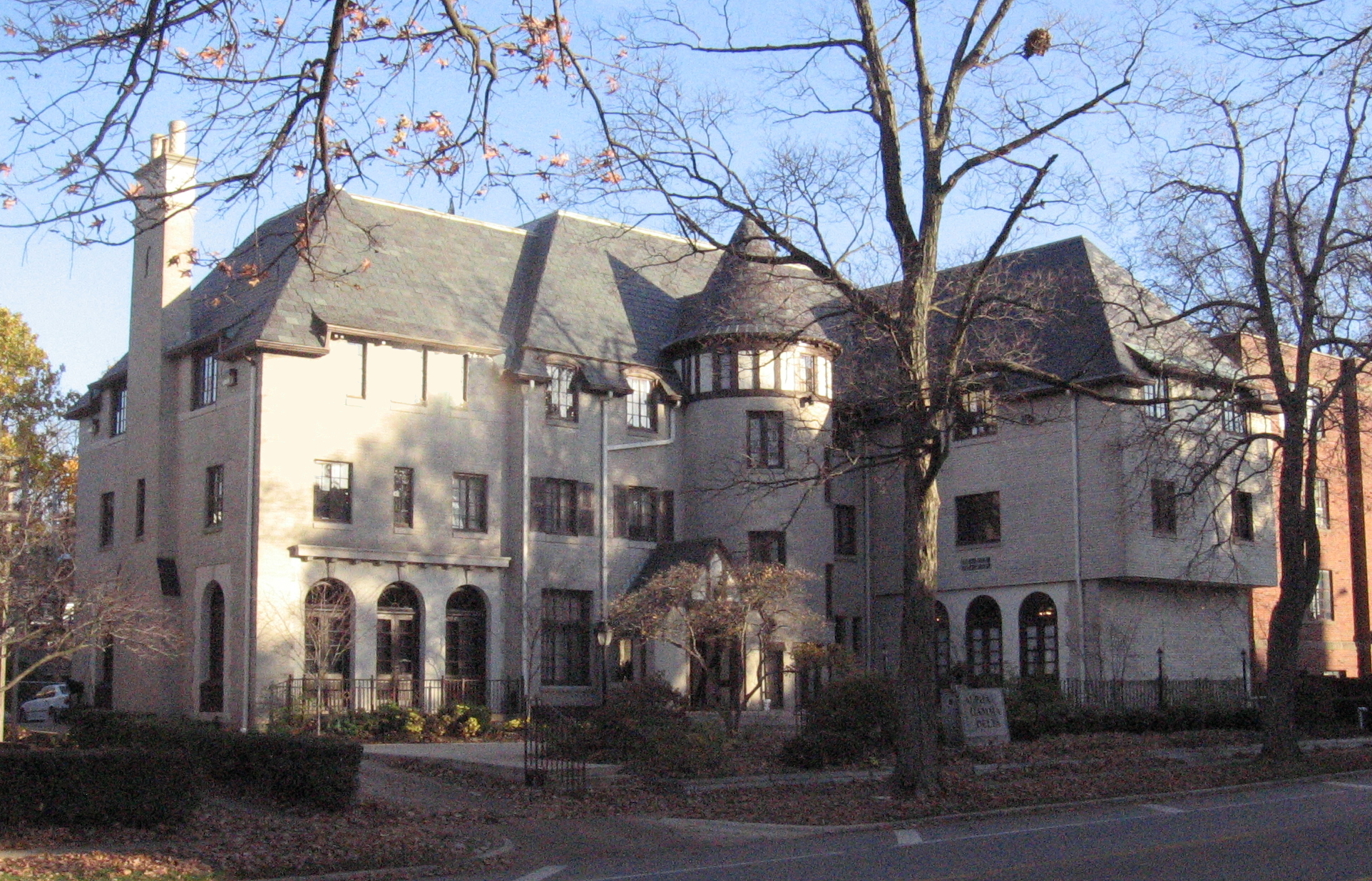
Alpha Gamma Delta chapter house at the University of Illinois at Urbana–Champaign

Since its founding, Alpha Gamma Delta has installed 199 collegiate chapters and more than 250 alumnae groups. These are grouped and named by geographical region. The longest-running active collegiate chapter is Delta chapter at the University of Minnesota. Since its re-establishment in 2010, the oldest active collegiate chapter is the Alpha chapter at Syracuse University.

== Notable members ==
Since its founding, Alpha Gamma Delta has initiated over 201,000 members.

== Chapter and member misconduct ==
In 1970 at Eastern Illinois University, Donna Bedlinger died from head trauma after she was left in the woods with other pledges as part of hazing.

In 2000, a member at the University of Georgia filed a discrimination complaint against her chapter, alleging that members denied a black classmate a membership offer due to her race. The chapter was temporarily suspended and received racial sensitivity training. After this incident, the university Interfraternity Conference created a diversity improvement program.

In 2013 and 2014, sorority women from multiple chapters at the University of Alabama – including Alpha Gamma Delta, Alpha Omicron Pi, Phi Mu, Kappa Delta, Pi Beta Phi, Delta Delta Delta, and Chi Omega – alleged that either active members or some alumnae had prevented them from offering membership to black candidates because of their race. Alpha Gamma Delta member Melanie Gotz stated that the entire collegiate chapter had "wanted this girl to be in Alpha Gam [but] were just powerless over the alums." An alum denied the allegations in the report, and the national headquarters issued a statement saying that the sorority "prohibits discrimination based on race in all of its activities including recruitment." Gotz and fellow students held a campus march to integrate campus Greek life, and following media and national outcry, the university held a second round of recruitment to offer membership to more women, including black women. The Alabama chapter initiated its first black member that year.

== See also ==
- College fraternities and sororities
- List of social sororities and women's fraternities
