= List of Swedish Americans =

The following is a list of notable Swedish Americans, including both original immigrants who obtained American citizenship and their American descendants.

== List ==
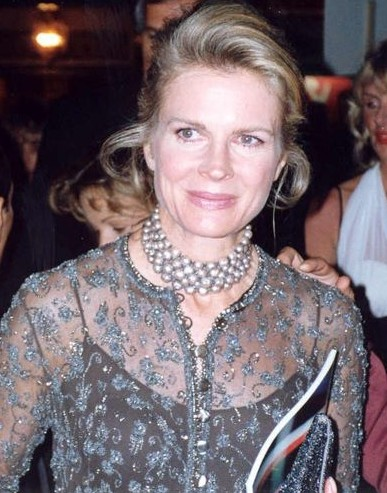
Candice Bergen

=== Entertainment ===
==== Actors ====
- Maud Adams, Swedish-born, Bond girl
- Malin Åkerman, Swedish-born actress and singer
- Ann-Margret, Swedish-born, actress and singer
- Candice Bergen, actress and fashion model, father of Swedish descent
- Edgar Bergen, actor and radio performer
- Ingrid Bergman, Swedish-born
- Nadia Bjorlin, soap opera actress, Swedish father
- Rowan Blanchard, American actress
- Veda Ann Borg, American film actress
- James Coburn, film actor
- Arthur Donaldson (1869–1955), Swedish-American actor
- Joseph J. Dowling, American actor; his mother was Swedish
- Stan Freberg, animation voice actor, author, recording artist, comedian, radio personality, puppeteer and advertising creative director
- Greta Garbo, Swedish-born, film actress
- Jake Gyllenhaal, actor; father was of Swedish descent
- Maggie Gyllenhaal, actress; father was of Swedish descent
- Mark Hamill, actor/voice actor
- Genevieve Hannelius, actress
- Signe Hasso, film actress
- Martha Hedman, Swedish-born, American stage actress
- Tippi Hedren, film actress, paternal grandparents were immigrants from Sweden
- Liza Huber, soap opera, television and stage actress
- Gunilla Hutton, film actress
- Scarlett Johansson, actress and singer, father of part Swedish descent
- Tor Johnson, actor and wrestler, Swedish-born
- Van Johnson, film and television actor, of part Swedish descent
- Val Kilmer, actor, mother was of Swedish descent
- Joel Kinnaman, actor, Swedish-born, American father and Swedish-Jewish mother
- Melinda Kinnaman, actress; half-sister of Joel; a Swedish and American citizen
- Kris Kristofferson, country music songwriter, singer and actor, father was of Swedish descent
- Jack Larson, actor
- Viveca Lindfors, stage and film actress
- Helen Lindroth, Swedish-born; screen and stage actress
- Susan Lucci, mother of part Swedish descent; soap opera actress

Ann-Margret

- Dolph Lundgren, actor, filmmaker, and martial artist.
- Jennette McCurdy, actress of Swedish descent
- Carlotta Nillson, Swedish-born, Broadway actress
- Anna Q. Nilsson, Swedish-born, silent film actress
- Warner Oland, actor.
- Nancy Olson, actress.
- Olivia Olson, actress and voice actress.
- Mary-Louise Parker, film actress, star in TV series Weeds, of 1/4 Swedish descent
- Dorothy Peterson, actress
- Ryan Potter, actor, mother of part Swedish descent
- Jeremy Renner, actor, of part Swedish descent
- Izabella Scorupco, actress
- Inger Stevens, Swedish-born, film and television actress
- Emma Stone, actress whose paternal grandfather is Swedish
- Erik Per Sullivan, Malcolm in the Middle actor.
- Gloria Swanson
- Bo Svenson, Swedish-born American actor, known for his roles in American genre films of the 1970s and 1980s
- Karl Swenson, film and television actor, radio personality, of Swedish parentage
- Burr Tillstrom, puppeteer and the creator of Kukla, Fran and Ollie
- Kari Wahlgren, voiceover actress
- Maiara Walsh, actress
- Irene Ware, actress in Hollywood; was in 40 movies, 1932-1940
- Richard Widmark, father was of Swedish descent
- Steve Zahn, of part Swedish descent

==== Music ====
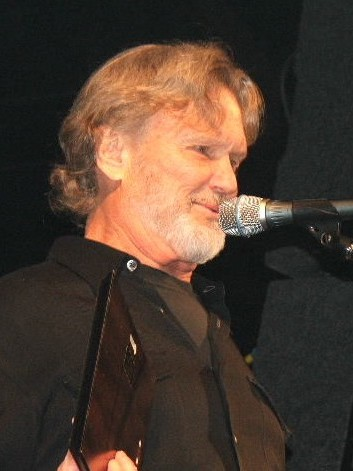
Kris Kristofferson

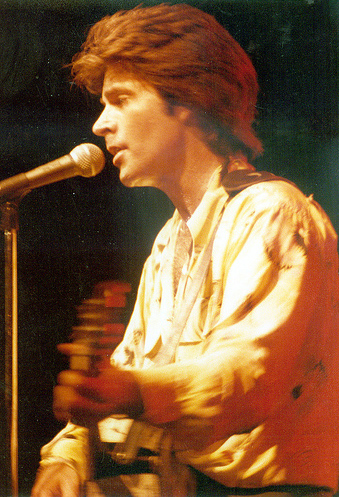
Ricky Nelson

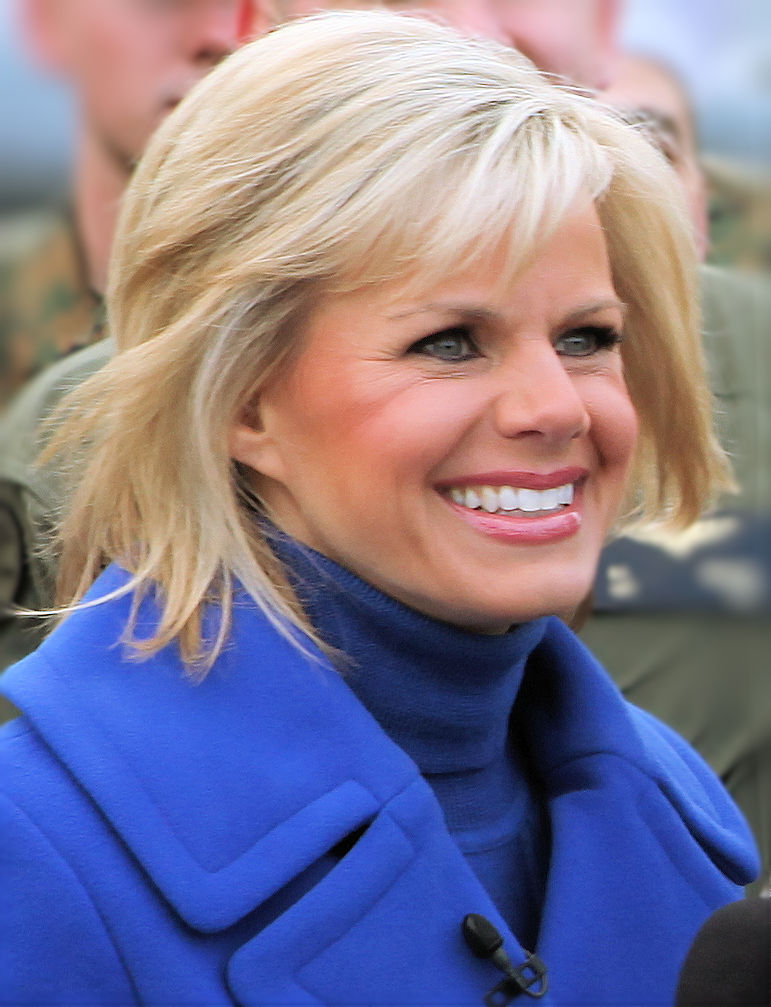
Gretchen Carlson

- Leroy Anderson, Swedish immigrant parents, composer
- Theresa Andersson, singer-songwriter
- Gustav Åhr (Lil Peep) rapper, singer and songwriter
- Herbert Blomstedt, orchestral conductor
- David Carlson, composer
- Olive Fremstad, Swedish-born, mezzo-soprano and soprano opera singer
- Jerry Garcia, singer and guitarist of the Grateful Dead
- Emilie Hammarskjöld, composer
- Chris Fehn, Percussionist and vocals of the band Slipknot
- Howard Hanson, composer, conductor, educator and music theorist
- Ragnar Hasselgren, Swedish-born singer and recording artist, who was active on the American West Coast from the 1920s through the 1970s
- Catherine Christer Hennix, composer
- Joe Hill, Swedish-born, songwriter, labor activist and member of the Industrial Workers of the World
- Scarlett Johansson, actress and singer, father of part Swedish descent
- Quincy Jones III, Swedish-born mother, composer, music producer, film producer and author
- Ben Jorgensen, writer and singer for Armor For Sleep
- Kris Kristofferson, influential country music singer-songwriter and actor
- MC Lars, rapper
- Peggy Lee, Swedish/Norwegian grandparents, jazz singer and songwriter
- Neil LeVang, musician
- Jim Lindberg, singer-songwriter for the American punk rock band Pennywise
- Kerry Livgren, musician-songwriter for the American band Kansas
- Nils Lofgren, singer-songwriter, multi-instrumentalist, member of Bruce Springsteen's E Street Band
- Mike Love, lead singer for The Beach Boys, mother was of half Swedish ancestry.
- Marjorie Lynn, singer who gained fame from WLS-AM radio in Chicago and the National Barn Dance, the precursor to the Grand Ole Opry
- Freddy Moore, singer-songwriter
- Ricky Nelson, singer-songwriter
- Harry Nilsson, singer-songwriter
- Jack Noren, jazz drummer and vocalist
- Ted Nugent, singer-songwriter, guitarist and political activist
- Carl E. Olivebring, Swedish singer whose career took place largely in America
- Birgit Ridderstedt, folk singer and producer
- Todd Rundgren, singer-songwriter
- Ilya Salmanzadeh, singer-songwriter and producer
- Grace Slick, singer-songwriter
- Amanda Swenson, soprano singer
- Hughie Thomasson, singer and guitarist
- Cal Tjader, Swedish parents, jazz musician
- Theodor Uppman, Swedish parents, opera singer
- Elle Varner, singer-songwriter, guitarist (Father is half-Swedish)
- Astrid Varnay, Swedish-born, opera singer
- Henry Vestine, guitarist, son of Ernest Harry Vestine
- Donnie Wahlberg, singer of pop group New Kids On The Block, actor and film producer.
- Brian Wilson, founding member of The Beach Boys, father was of partial Swedish ancestry.
- Carl Wilson, lead guitarist for the Beach Boys, brother of Brian and Dennis, father was half Swedish.
- Carnie Wilson, daughter of Brian Wilson. Her great-grandmother was Swedish.
- Dennis Wilson, drummer of the Beach Boys, father was half Swedish.
- Murry Wilson, record producer, songwriter, and father of Brian, Dennis and Carl Wilson of the Beach Boys. Mother was Swedish.
- Wendy Wilson, sister of Carnie Wilson and daughter of Brian Wilson. Great-grandmother was Swedish.

==== Other ====
- Ludwig Ahgren, won the award for "Streamer of the Year" in 2022 and is one of the biggest gaming streamers on Twitch and YouTube.
- Mary Katherine Campbell, two-time Miss America winner in 1922 and 1923; mother was half Swedish
- Gretchen Carlson, journalist, co-host of Fox & Friends on Fox News Channel, former Miss America
- Leticia Cline, model
- Steve Dahl, longtime Chicago radio disc jockey and talk personality, influential early "shock jock"
- Cary Fukunaga, director, writer, film producer and cinematographer
- Stephen Gyllenhaal, director
- Mitch Hedberg, comedian
- Verne Lundquist, sportscaster, currently employed by CBS Sports television
- Ozzie Nelson, Swedish immigrant father, entertainer, radio and television actor
- Hjalmar Peterson, vaudeville artist
- Nena von Schlebrügge, fashion model in the 1950s and 1960s; born in Mexico but of German and Swedish descent; mother of actress Uma Thurman
- Steven Soderbergh, film producer, screenwriter, cinematographer, editor and Oscar-winning director, of part Swedish descent

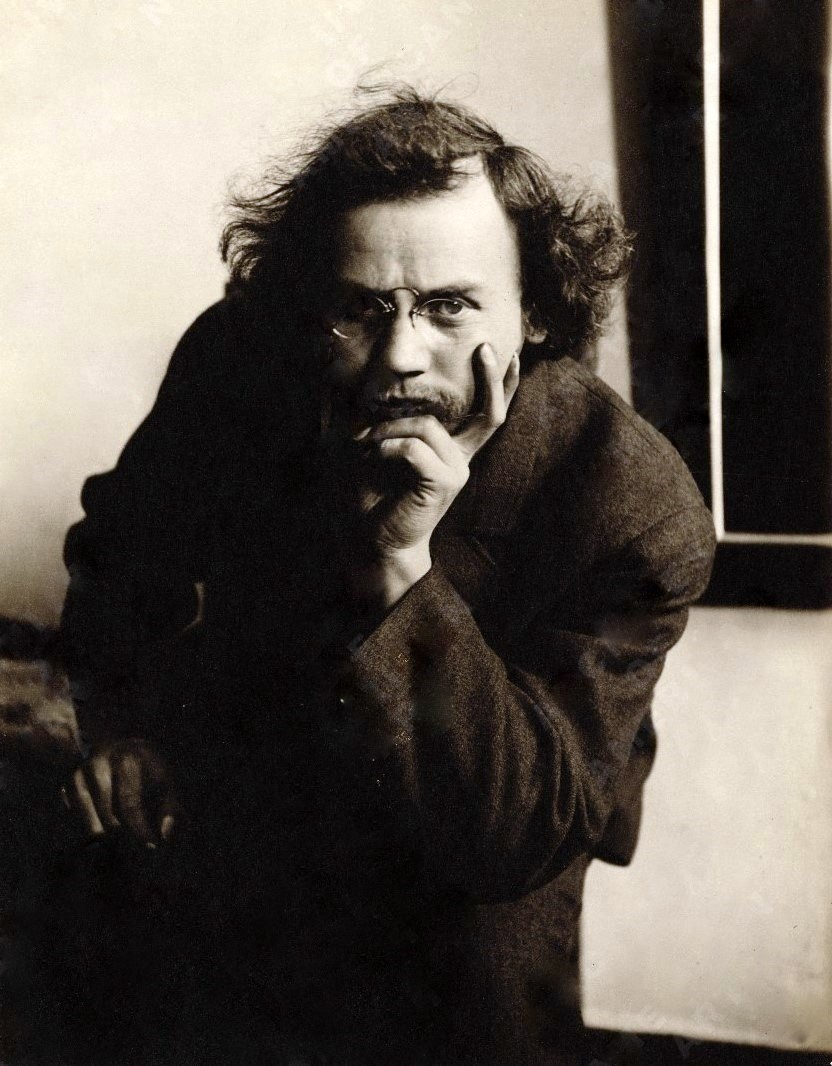
Bror Julius Olsson Nordfeldt

=== Artists ===
- John Alvin Anderson, Swedish-American photographer who is known for photographing Sioux Indians at the Rosebud Indian Reservation in South Dakota from 1885 until 1930
- Carl Oscar Borg, Swedish-born, painter, known for themes of the Southwestern United States
- Edward William Carlson, Swedish-American miniature portrait painter
- Peter David Edstrom, Swedish-born, sculptor
- Arnold Friberg, American illustrator and painter noted for his religious and patriotic works. He is perhaps best known for his 1975 painting The Prayer at Valley Forge, a depiction of George Washington praying at Valley Forge.
- Bud Grace, cartoonist
- Paul Granlund, sculptor
- Albinus Hasselgren, painter and sculptor
- Knute Heldner, Swedish-born, American artist
- Gustavus Hesselius, Swedish-born, painter
- John Hesselius, portraitist
- Magnus Colcord "Rusty" Heurlin (1895–1986), Swedish-born, Swedish-American artist and painter best known for his depictions of Alaskan landscapes
- John Philip Hultberg, American expressionist and realist painter with parents of Swedish descent
- Paul Eric Hultberg, American multidisciplinary artist of Swedish descent pioneering large scale enamel murals on copper and steel
- Oscar Jacobson, Swedish-born American painter and museum curator. From 1915 to 1945, he was the director of the University of Oklahoma's School of Art
- Emil Janel, artist
- Lester Johnson, painter
- Olof Krans, Swedish-born, artist and painter
- Michael Kors, fashion designer
- Hope Larson, illustrator and cartoonist
- Karl Larsson, Swedish-born, painter, engraver and sculptor
- Evan Lindquist, artist, printmaker, first artist laureate of Arkansas
- Carl Lotave, painter of portraits, illustrator, and sculptor
- Bror Julius Olsson Nordfeldt, Swedish-born, artist
- Claes Oldenburg, Swedish-born, sculptor, best known for his public art
- David Oscarson, Swedish American pen designer
- Paul Kuniholm Pauper, Swedish mother, Norwegian father; sculptor
- Susan Mohl Powers, sculptor
- Henry Reuterdahl, Swedish-American painter highly acclaimed for his nautical artwork. He had a long relationship with the United States Navy
- Christopher Ross, sculptor with father of Swedish descent
- Birger Sandzén, Swedish-born, painter
- Art Spiegelman, Jewish American cartoonist, born and spent his early life in Stockholm
- Haddon Sundblom, creator of Santa Claus images for the Coca-Cola Company
- John August Swanson, Swedish father, visual artist, painter
- Gustaf Tenggren, Swedish-born, illustrator
- Carl E. Wallin, Swedish-born, artist and painter
- Gunnar Widforss, Swedish-born, artist specializing in landscapes

=== Engineers ===
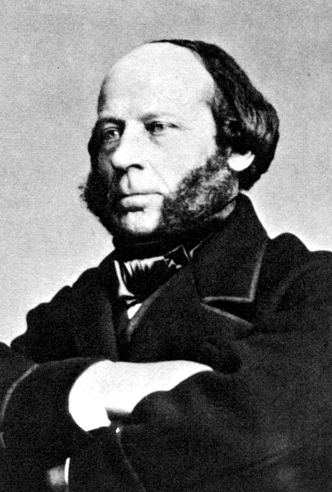
John Ericsson

- Ernst Alexanderson, Swedish-born, electrical engineer
- Ragnar Benson, Chicago building contractor
- Ernst Julius Berg, Swedish-born, American electrical engineer. A pioneer of radio, he produced the first two-way radio voice program in the United States
- Stig Bergström, Swedish-American paleontologist who described the conodont family Paracordylodontidae and in 1974, he described the multielement conodont genus Appalachignathus from the Middle Ordovician of North America
- Chester Carlson, physicist, inventor, and patent attorney
- John Ericsson, Swedish-born, inventor and mechanical engineer
- Carl Friden, Swedish-born, American mechanical engineer and businessman who founded the Friden Calculating Machine Company
- Clarence "Kelly" Johnson, Swedish-born parents, aircraft engineer and aeronautical innovator, considered one of the most talented and prolific aircraft design-engineers
- John B. Johnson, Swedish-born, electrical engineer and physicist
- Clarence Hugo Linder, of Swedish descent, electrical engineer, founding member of the National Academy of Engineering
- Harry Nyquist, Swedish-born, engineer, important contributor to information theory
- John W. Nystrom, engineer Swedish born, American civil engineer, inventor, and author. He served as an assistant Secretary and Chief Engineer of the United States Navy during the American Civil War.
- Arvid Reuterdahl, Swedish-American engineer, scientist and educator

=== Entrepreneurs and businesspeople ===
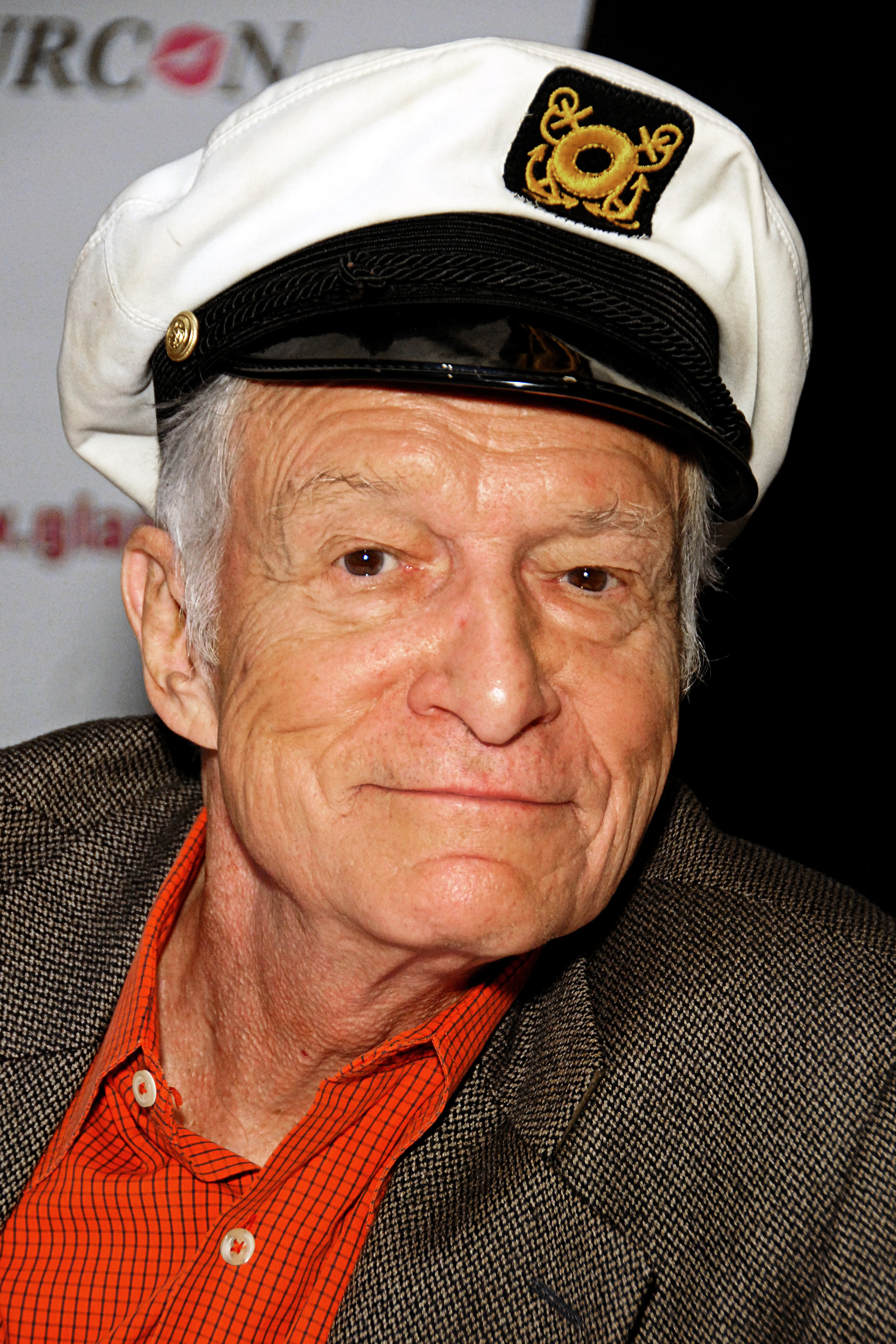
Hugh Hefner

- Christopher Ahlberg, computer scientist and entrepreneur
- Gene Amdahl, computer architect and entrepreneur
- Ragnar Benson, Swedish-born building contractor & philanthropist
- John L. Anderson (shipbuilder), preeminent figure in Washington state maritime industries in the first half of the twentieth century, particularly ferry service, shipbuilding, and ship-based tourism. He ran the largest ferry fleet on Lake Washington for three decades.
- Asplundh Tree Expert Company, American company which specializes in tree pruning and vegetation management for utilities and government agencies and was founded by three Swedish-American brothers
- John Brynteson, Swedish-born, Alaskan mining executive
- Curt Carlson, founder of Carlson
- Carl G. Cromwell, Texas-based oil and aviation pioneer
- John Erlander, Swedish-born, founder of Rockford Union Furniture Company
- Ernest O. Estwing, Swedish-born, founder of Estwing Manufacturing Company
- Carl Friden, Swedish-born, founder of Friden, Inc.
- John Alfred Headlund, Swedish-born American architect
- Oscar Hedstrom, Swedish-born, co-founder of the Indian Motocycle Manufacturing Company
- Walter Hoving, Swedish-born, head of Tiffany & Company
- Andrew Johnson (architect), Swedish–American architect and contractor.
- J. Erik Jonsson, Swedish immigrant parents, co-founder and former president of Texas Instruments Incorporated, mayor of Dallas and philanthropist
- Arvid Emanuel Kallen, Swedish-born, General Motors executive
- George Kellgren, Swedish-born, founder of Kel-Tec, manufacturer of firearms.
- Michael Kors, founder of Michael Kors Holdings Limited (KORS)
- Reginald Lenna, philanthropist and CEO of Blackstone Company
- Eli Lilly, philanthropist and founder of Eli Lilly and Company
- Josua Lindahl, Swedish American geologist and paleontologist. He was a professor at Augustana College from 1878 to 1888, then was Illinois State Geologist until 1893. He is the namesake of the extinct Cyprinidae subspecies Aphelichthys lindahlii
- Lars-Eric Lindblad, Swedish-American entrepreneur and explorer, who pioneered tourism to many remote and exotic parts of the world. He led the first tourist expedition to Antarctica in 1966
- John R. Lindgren, banking executive with State Bank of Chicago, founder of Haugan & Lindgren banking firm in Chicago
- Karl G. Malmgren, architect in the Pacific Northwest
- William Matson, Swedish-born, founder of Matson Navigation Company
- John W. Nordstrom, Swedish-born, co-founder of the Nordstrom department store chain
- G.L. Norrman, Swedish-born, important architect in the southeastern United States
- Rudolph A. Peterson, Swedish-born, President and CEO of Bank of America
- Norman Ralston, co-founder of Aero Air
- Cristina Stenbeck, Swedish father, American mother, businesswoman
- Carl Strandlund, Swedish-born, inventor and entrepreneur
- Gideon Sundbäck, Swedish-born, inventor, commercialized the zipper, son-in-law of colleague Peter Aronson
- David Sundstrand, Swedish-born American inventor of the 10-key adding machine, 10-key calculator keyboard, a 10-keypad now used on computer keyboards
- Carl A. Swanson, Swedish-born, founder of Swanson
- Swante M. Swenson, Swedish-born, founder of the SMS Ranches
- Nils F. Testor, Swedish-born, founder of Testor Corporation
- Charles Rudolph Walgreen, founder of Walgreens, one of America's largest pharmacy chains; Swedish-born parents
- Charles Rudolph Walgreen Jr., President of Walgreens
- Charles R. Walgreen III, President of Walgreens
- Henrik Wallin, Savannah, Georgia-based architect
- Magnus Wahlström, Swedish American entrepreneur and later a philanthropist who founded Bridgeport (machine tool brand)
- Carl Wickman, founder of Greyhound Lines

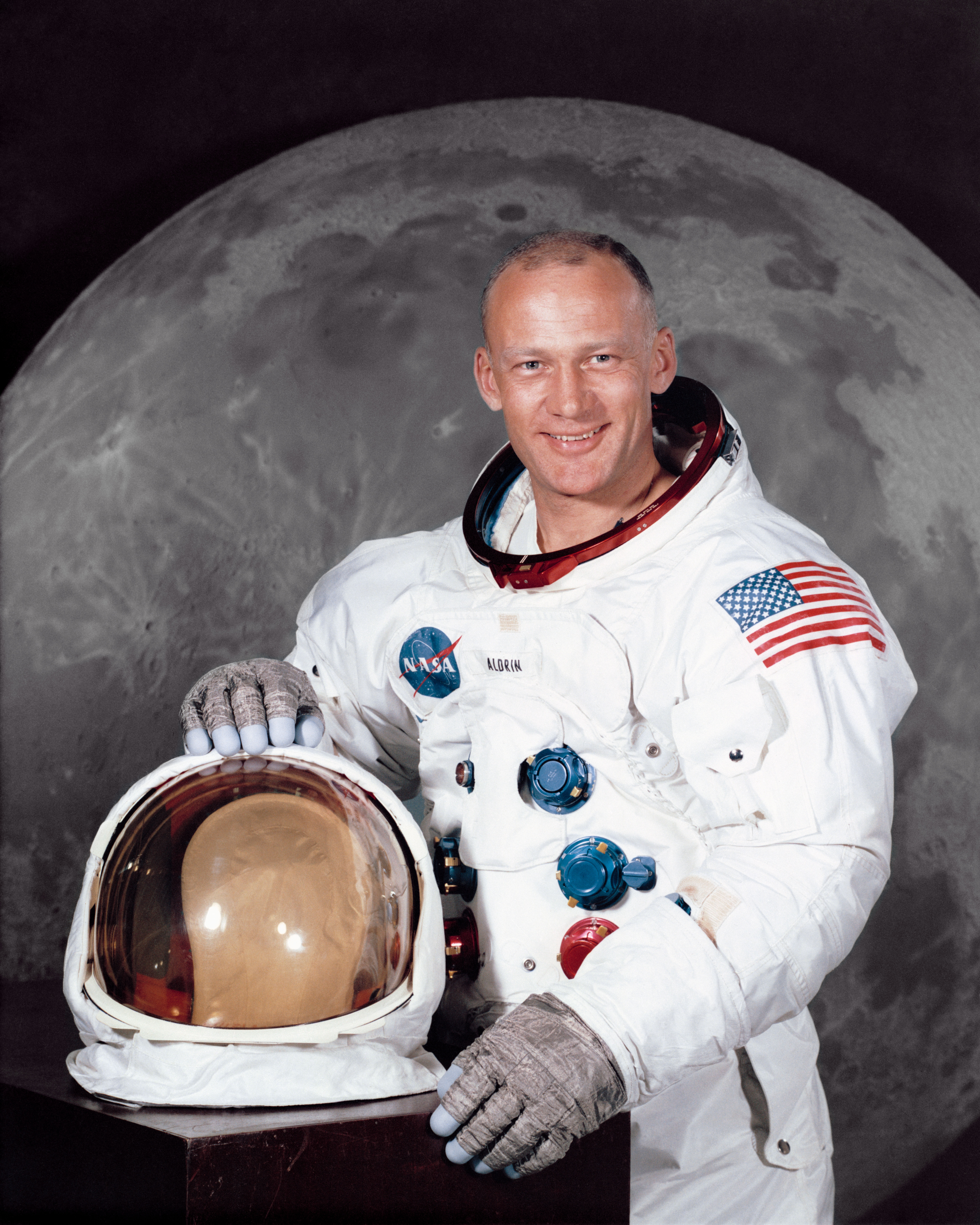
Buzz Aldrin

=== Military ===
- William Anderson (Medal of Honor), Medal of honor recipient in 1878
- William Y. Anderson, Swedish-born American fighter ace of World War II
- Buzz Aldrin, pilot and astronaut, Lunar Module Pilot on Apollo 11, the first lunar landing
- Eric Bergland, Swedish-born American military officer who fought in the American Civil War as a volunteer officer, graduated from West Point at the top of his class, served his adopted country with distinction as an officer of the regular army, a professor of his alma mater, and a Western explorer, and married a cousin of the wife of president Rutherford B. Hayes
- Richard I. Bong, US Army Air Force and Medal of Honor recipient
- Arleigh Burke, US Navy Admiral
- John A. Dahlgren, US Navy Rear Admiral
- John Ernest Dahlquist, US Army four-star general
- Eric G. Gibson, Swedish-born, US Army soldier and Medal of Honor recipient
- Roger Hanson, Confederate States Army General

Emil Holmdahl and his pet dog during the campaign against Zapata. c 1913

- Emil Lewis Holmdahl, machine gunner, soldier of fortune, spy, gun runner, and treasure hunter who fought under John J. Pershing in the Spanish–American War in the Philippines, under Lee Christmas in Central America, under Francisco Madero, Pancho Villa, and Venustiano Carranza in the Mexican Revolution, and under John J. Pershing in World War I. In 1926, Holmdahl was accused of having stolen Francisco Pancho Villa's head.
- Arthur C. Lundahl, was responsible for establishing the Central Intelligence Agency's National Photographic Interpretation Center, a forerunner of the National Geospatial-Intelligence Agency, and led the photointerpretation section of the U-2 reconnaissance program.
- Gregory G. Johnson, US Navy admiral
- Charles Linn, Swedish-born, captain in the Confederate States Navy
- Oscar Malmborg, lieutenant colonel in the Union Army
- Charles Momsen, US Navy vice admiral
- Charles J. Stolbrand, Swedish-born brigadier general in American Civil War
- Ivor Thord-Gray, Swedish-born, mercenary soldier

=== Politics and public service ===
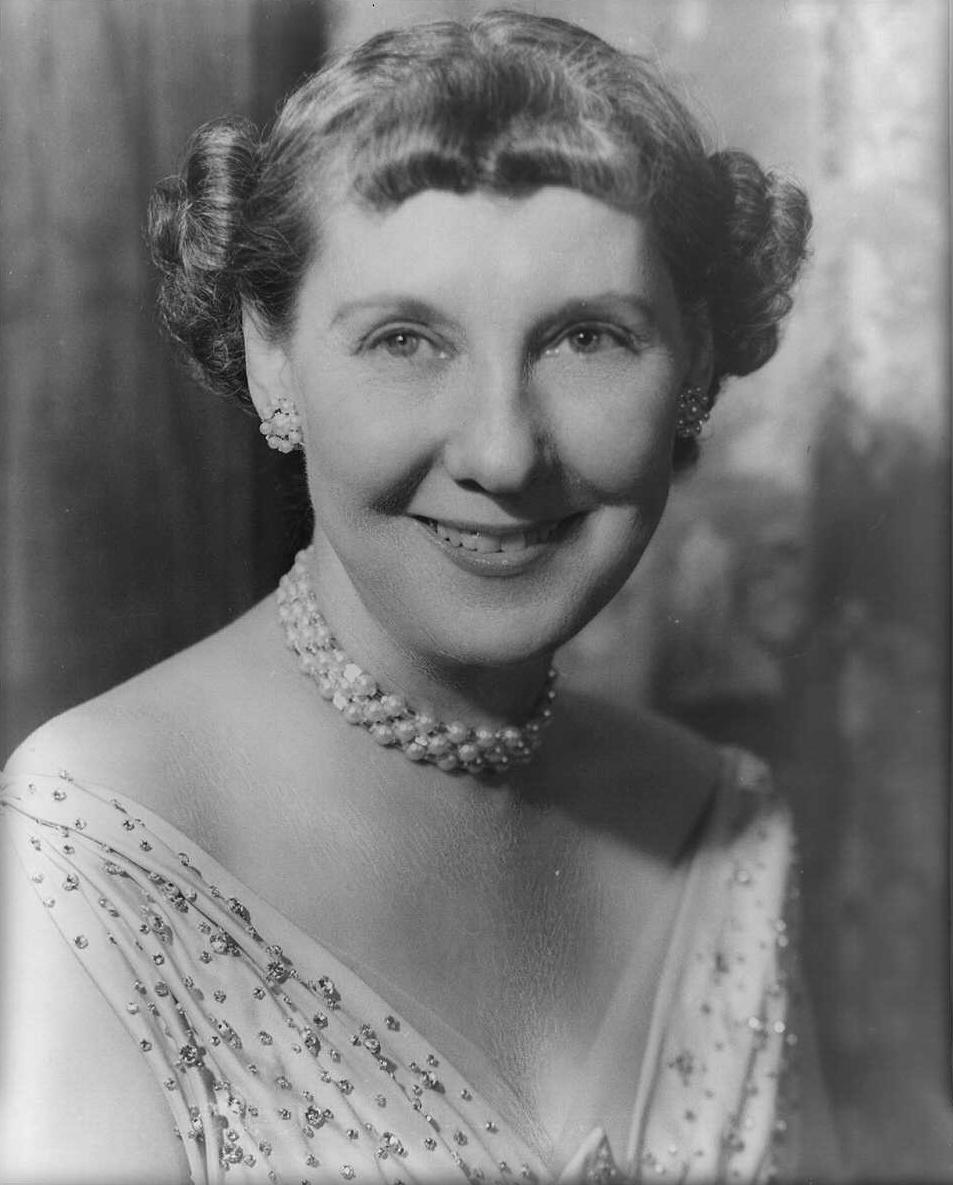
Mamie Eisenhower

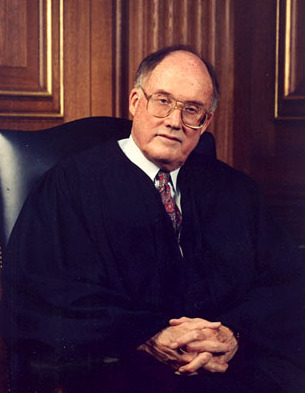
William Rehnquist

- Elmer L. Andersen, 30th Governor of Minnesota
- C. Elmer Anderson, 28th Governor of Minnesota
- John B. Anderson, US Representative from Illinois and an Independent candidate in the 1980 presidential election
- Sydney Anderson, US Representative from Minnesota
- Wendell Anderson, 33rd Governor of Minnesota, from January 4, 1971, to December 29, 1976
- August H. Andresen, US Representative from Minnesota
- J. Hugo Aronson, 14th Governor of Montana, Montana State Senator, Montana State Representative
- Robert Bergland, US Representative from Minnesota, 20th United States Secretary of Agriculture
- Joseph A. A. Burnquist, 19th Governor of Minnesota
- Arne Carlson, 37th Governor of Minnesota
- William H. Carlson, 7th Mayor of San Diego, California State Assemblyman
- Carl Richard Chindblom, US Representative from Illinois
- Byron Dorgan, US Senator
- Adolph Olson Eberhart, 17th Governor of Minnesota, 17th Lieutenant Governor of Minnesota, Minnesota State Senator
- Lenea Edlund, Washington State Representative
- Mamie Eisenhower, wife of Dwight D. Eisenhower and First Lady of the United States from 1953 to 1961
- C.J.A. Ericson, Iowa businessman and politician
- Thomas Frankson, 22nd Lieutenant Governor of Minnesota
- Orville Freeman, 29th Governor of Minnesota, 16th United States Secretary of Agriculture
- Tipper Gore, wife of Vice President Al Gore
- Jennifer Granholm, Governor of the state of Michigan; of Finnish-Swedish ancestry
- John Hoeven, US Senator
- Mike Holm, Swedish-born American politician and the longest-serving Minnesota Secretary of State
- Pehr G. Holmes, Member of the US House of Representatives from Massachusetts, Massachusetts Executive Councilor, 38th Mayor of Worcester, Massachusetts, Worcester, Massachusetts Alderman, Worcester, Massachusetts Common Councilor
- David Hultgren, former politician and judge in Illinois
- Johnny Isakson, 2nd generation, Republican Senator from Georgia
- Daniel of St. Thomas Jenifer, Founding Father, signer of the U.S. Constitution
- John Albert Johnson, 16th Governor of Minnesota
- Joseph B. Johnson, Swedish-born, 70th Governor of Vermont, 65 Lieutenant Governor of Vermont, Vermont State Senator, Vermont State Representative
- Magnus Johnson, Swedish-born, US Senator from Minnesota
- Tim Johnson, US Senator from South Dakota, father was of mostly Swedish ancestry
- U. Alexis Johnson, US diplomat
- Harold LeVander, 32nd Governor of Minnesota
- John Lind, Swedish-born, 14th Governor of Minnesota, Member of the US House of Representatives for Minnesota
- Charles August Lindbergh, Member of the US House of Representatives from Minnesota
- Gottfrid Lindsten, 32nd Lieutenant Governor of Minnesota
- Zoe Lofgren, Member of the US House of Representatives from California
- Ernest Lundeen, US Senator from Minnesota
- Dan Lungren, Member of the US House of Representatives from California
- Warren G. Magnuson, US Senator from Washington
- Hans Mattson, Swedish American politician. He served with distinction as a colonel in the American Civil War (1861–65) and in 1869 became the Minnesota Secretary of State. He later served as United States Consul General in India
- Gregory J. Newell, former US Ambassador to Sweden (1985–1989); US Assistant Secretary of State for International Organization Affairs (1982–1985); former assistant secretary of State for President Ronald Reagan
- Albin Walter Norblad, Sr, Swedish-born, 19th Governor of Oregon (father of Albin Walter Norblad, Jr, grandfather of Albin Walter Norblad III), President of the Oregon State Senate, Oregon State Senator,
- Albin Walter Norblad, Jr, Member of the US House of Representatives from Oregon (son of Albin Walter Norblad, Sr, father of Albin Walter Norblad III)
- Albin Walter Norblad III, attorney, judge of the Oregon Circuit Court (son of Albin Walter Norblad, Jr, grandson of Albin Walter Norblad, Sr)
- John Norquist, 43rd Mayor of Milwaukee
- Floyd B. Olson, 22nd Governor of Minnesota
- Lyndon Lowell Olson, Jr., politician and diplomat
- James Oscarson, Swedish American politician
- Alfred J. Pearson, Swedish born-American educator and diplomat
- Mike Rounds, US Senator from South Dakota
- William Rehnquist, lawyer, jurist and a political figure, who served as an Associate Justice of the Supreme Court of the United States and later as the Chief Justice of the United States
- Adam Strohm, Swedish-American librarian. Strohm served as chief librarian of the Detroit Public Library from 1912 until his retirement in 1941
- Adolphus Frederic St. Sure, United States District Court Judge
- Carl Skoglund, socialist
- Charles Stenholm, Member of the US House of Representatives from Texas
- Don Sundquist, 47th Governor of Tennessee
- David Ivar Swanson, Swedish-American Illinois state representative for the Republican Party who served 24 years in the Illinois state legislature between the years 1922-46 and 1948–50
- Jon Tester, US Senator from Montana
- Tim Walberg, US Representative
- Monrad Wallgren, 13th Governor of Washington, Member of the US House of Representatives and the US Senator from Washington
- Earl Warren, California district attorney of Alameda County, the 30th Governor of California, and the 14th Chief Justice of the United States (from 1953 to 1969); of Swedish and Norwegian descent
- Luther Youngdahl, 27th Governor of Minnesota
- Oscar Youngdahl, Member of the US House of Representatives from Minnesota
- G. Aaron Youngquist, Swedish-American lawyer and public prosecutor. He served as Minnesota Attorney General and as the Assistant U.S. Attorney General who successfully prosecuted Al Capone for federal income tax evasion

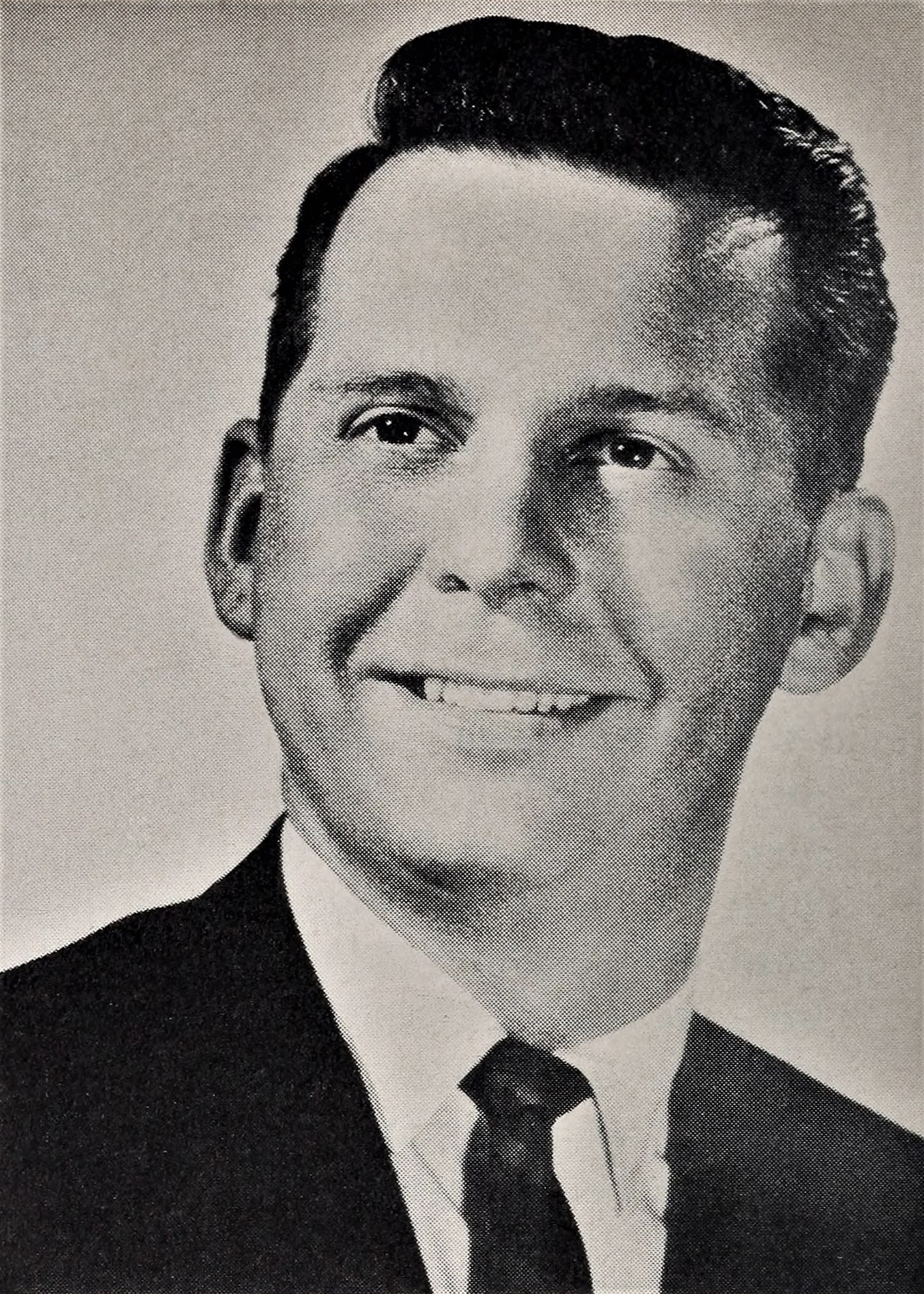
Paul Carlson

=== Religious personalities ===
- Conrad Bergendoff, Lutheran theologian and historian
- Marcus Borg, religious author
- Paul Carlson, medical missionary of the Evangelical Covenant Church
- Erland Carlsson, Swedish-born, Lutheran minister and one of the founders and President of the Augustana Synod
- John Alexis Edgren, Swedish-born, Baptist minister, founder of Bethel University in St. Paul, Minnesota
- Lars Paul Esbjörn, Swedish-born, Lutheran minister and one of the founders of the Augustana Synod of the Lutheran church
- Nils Frykman, Swedish-born, evangelist, hymnwriter and prominent figure in the Evangelical Covenant Church
- Tuve Hasselquist, Swedish-born, Lutheran minister and founding president of the Augustana Synod
- Johannes Alfred Hultman, Swedish-born, evangelist, hymnwriter and founding member of the Evangelical Covenant Church
- Eric Jansson, Swedish-born, pietist leader
- Andrew Nelson, missionary, linguist and lexicographer associated with the Seventh-day Adventist Church
- Russell M. Nelson, renowned heart surgeon, college professor, President of the Church of Jesus Christ of Latter-day Saints
- Thomas S. Monson, President of the Church of Jesus Christ of Latter-day Saints
- Eric Norelius, Swedish-born, Lutheran minister and one of the founders and President of the Augustana Synod
- David Nyvall, Swedish-born, immigrant and church leader who helped shape the Evangelical Covenant Church and establish North Park University
- Dale G. Renlund, junior member of the Quorum of the Twelve Apostles in the Church of Jesus Christ of Latter-day Saints
- Andreas Rudman, Swedish-born, pioneer Lutheran minister and pastor of Gloria Dei (Old Swedes') Church
- Gustaf Unonius, Swedish-born, Episcopalian clergyman and immigrant

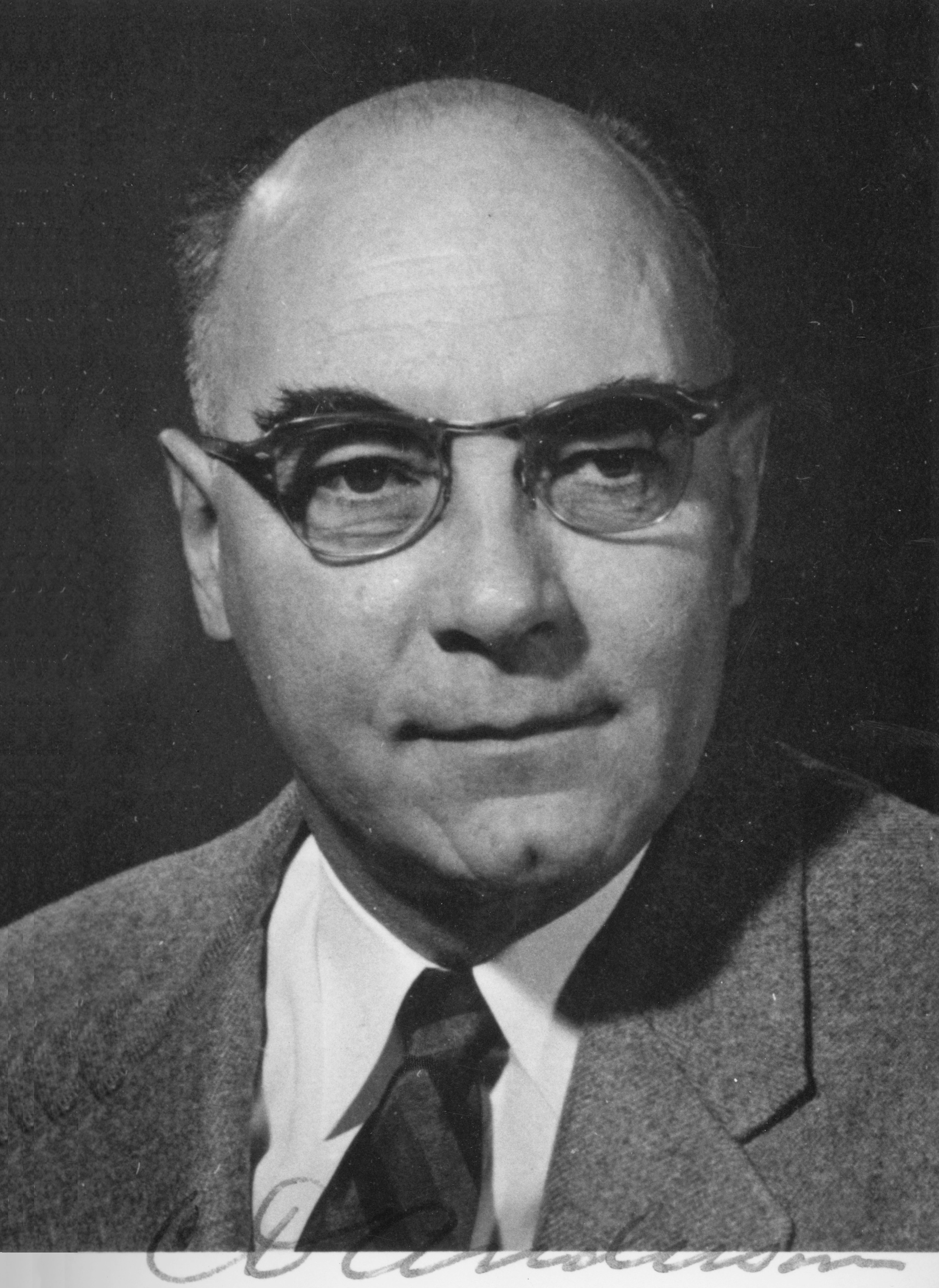
Carl David Anderson

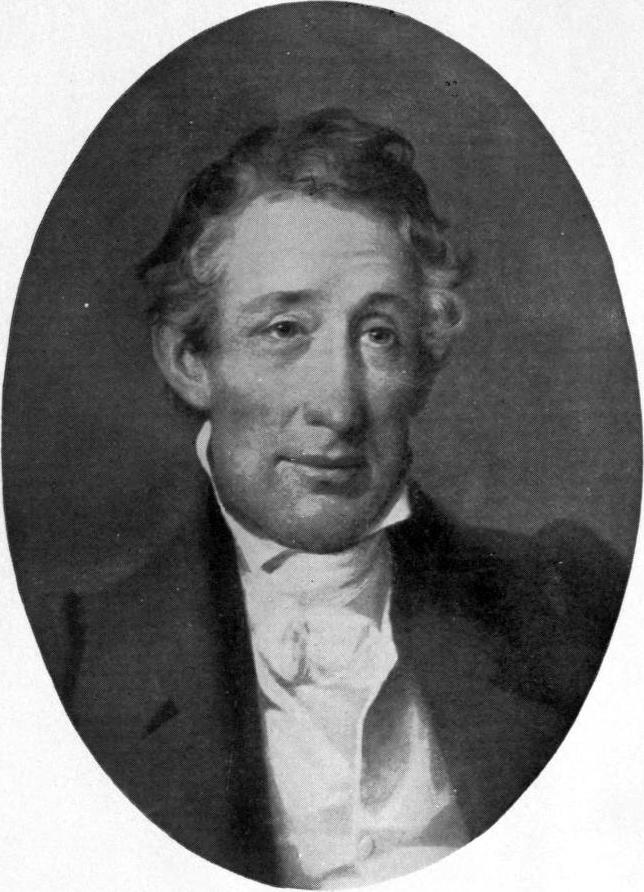
George Ord

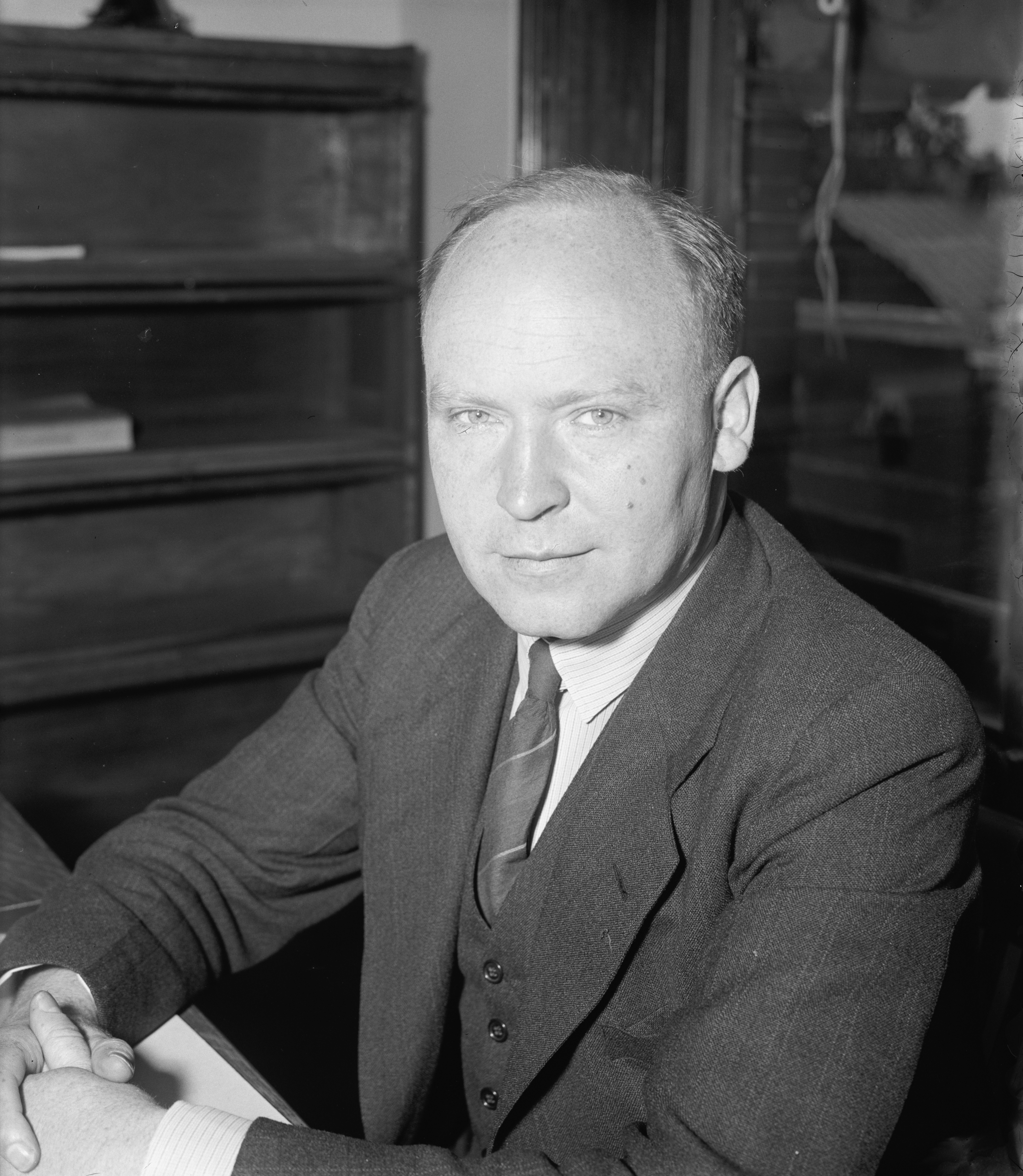
Carl-Gustaf Rossby

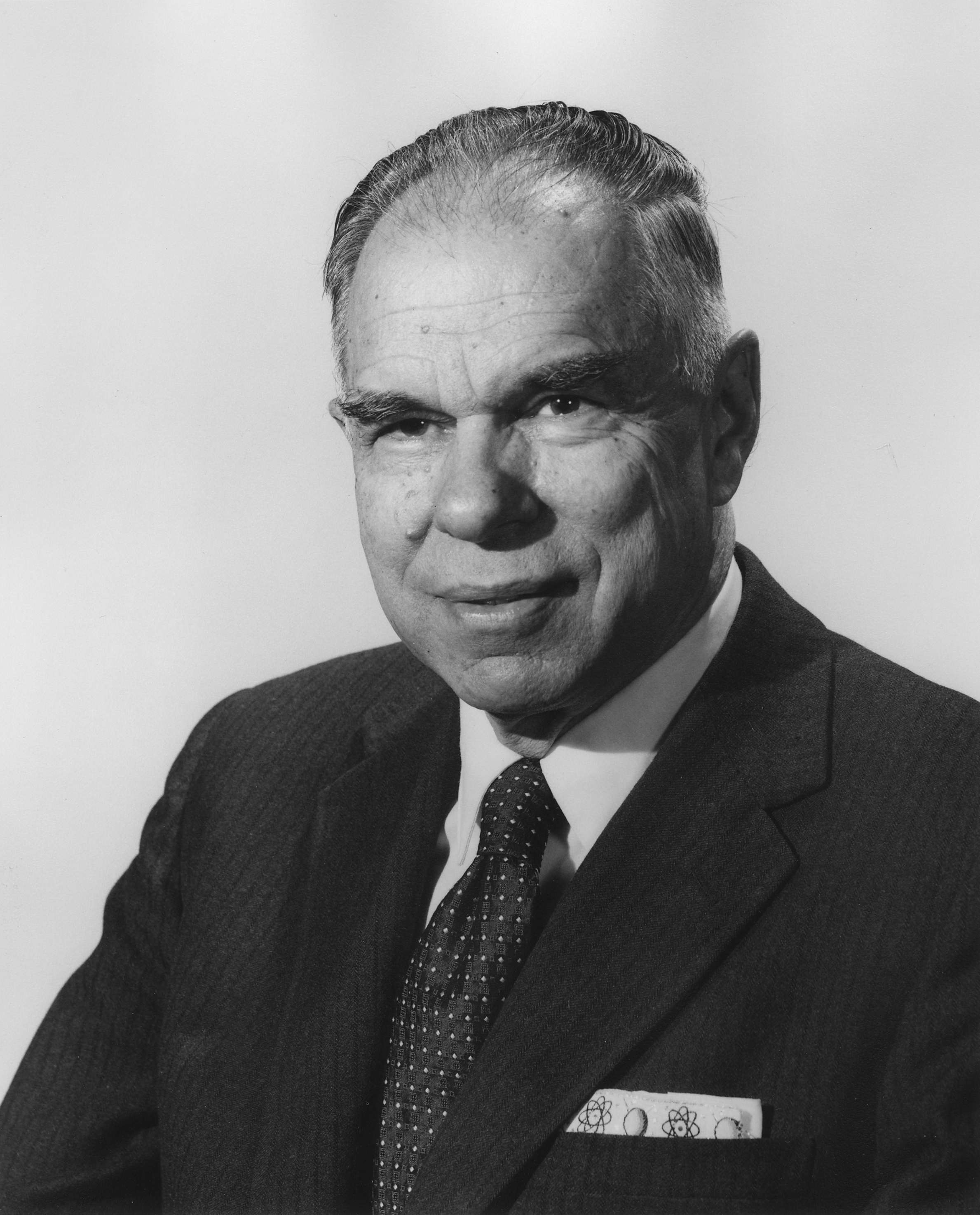
Glenn T. Seaborg

=== Science ===
- Carl David Anderson, physicist who won 1936 Nobel Prize in Physics
- Alexander P. Anderson, was an American plant physiologist, botanist, educator and inventor. His scientific experiments led to the discovery of "puffed rice", a starting point for a new breakfast cereal that was later advertised as "Food Shot From Guns"
- Ernst Antevs, was a Swedish-American geologist and educator who made significant contributions to Quaternary geology, particularly geomorphology and geochronology
- Hugo Leander Blomquist, was a Swedish-born American botanist. His well-rounded expertise encompassed fungi, bacteria, bryophytes, algae, grasses, and ferns
- John Elof Boodin, Swedish-born, philosopher and educator
- Anton Julius Carlson, was a Swedish American physiologist. Carlson was Chairman of the Physiology Department at the University of Chicago from 1916 until 1940
- Gunnar E. Carlsson, professor
- John Carlstrom, Swedish-American astrophysicist, and Professor, Departments of Astronomy and Astrophysics, and Physics, at the University of Chicago
- Walter Elmer Ekblaw, geologist, botanist, and college professor
- Gustav Eisen, was a Swedish-American polymath. He became a member of California Academy of Sciences in 1874 and a Life Member in 1883
- Per Enflo, University Professor of Mathematics at Kent State University
- Otto Folin, was a Swedish-born American chemist who is best known for his groundbreaking work at Harvard University
- Fritiof Fryxell, was an American educator, geologist and mountain climber, best known for his research and writing on the Teton Range of Wyoming
- Lennart Heimer, was a Swedish-American neuroscientist and professor at the Massachusetts Institute of Technology and the University of Virginia. He was most noted for mapping circuits of the brain in the limbic lobe and basal ganglia, structures that play central roles in emotion processing and movement
- John Bertrand Johnson, Swedish-born American electrical engineer and physicist. He first explained in detail a fundamental source of random interference with information traveling on wires
- Torkel Korling, Swedish-born American industrial, commercial, portrait and botanical photographer
- Ludwig Kumlien, was an American ornithologist. He took part in the Howgate Polar Expedition 1877-78 and collected a large number of bird specimens which led to the discovery of several new species
- Thure Kumlien, was a Swedish-American ornithologist, naturalist, and taxidermist. A contemporary of Thoreau, Audubon, and Agassiz, he contributed much to the knowledge of the natural history of Wisconsin and its birds
- John Bernhard Leiberg, Swedish-American botanical explorer, forester, and bryologist
- Paco Lagerstrom, was an applied mathematician and aeronautical engineer
- David R. Lindberg, malacologist, professor of integrative biology at the University of California, Berkeley
- Charles E. Lindblom, was an American academic who was Sterling Professor Emeritus of Political Science and Economics at Yale University
- Waldemar Lindgren, was a Swedish-American geologist. Lindgren was one of the founders of modern economic geology
- Carl Marcus Olson, has been credited as the discoverer of the process to make silicon pure.
- George Ord, zoologist who specialized in North American ornithology and mammalogy
- Roger Tory Peterson naturalist, ornithologist, illustrator and educator, held to be one of the founding inspirations for the 20th-century environmental movement, his father was a Swedish immigrant
- Carl-Gustaf Rossby, Swedish-born American meteorologist who first explained the large-scale motions of the atmosphere in terms of fluid mechanics. He identified and characterized both the jet stream and the long waves in the westerlies that were later named Rossby waves
- Per Axel Rydberg, Swedish-born, American botanist who was the first curator of the New York Botanical Garden Herbarium
- Glenn T. Seaborg, Nobel Prize laureate, chemist prominent in the discovery and isolation of ten transuranic elements including plutonium, americium, curium, berkelium, californium, einsteinium, fermium, mendelevium, nobelium and seaborgium, which was named in his honor
- Thorsten Sellin, was a Swedish American sociologist at the University of Pennsylvania, a penologist and one of the pioneers of scientific criminology
- Folke K. Skoog, Swedish-born American plant physiologist who was a pioneer in the field of plant growth regulators
- Orvar Swenson, Swedish-born American pediatric surgeon. He discovered the cause of Hirschsprung's disease and in 1948, with Alexander Bill, performed the first pull-through operation in a child with megacolon
- Max Tegmark, cosmologist and associate professor of physics at MIT
- Stephan Thernstrom, Winthrop Research Professor of History Emeritus at Harvard University
- Ernest Harry Vestine, geophysicist and meteorologist
- J. E. Wallace Wallin, was an American psychologist and an early proponent of educational services for the mentally handicapped
- Nils Yngve Wessell, was a Swedish-American psychologist and the eighth president of Tufts University from 1953 to 1966, overseeing its transformation from a small liberal arts college to an internationally known research university
- Peter Jansen Wester, was a Swedish-American agricultural botanist. Born in Sweden, he emigrated to the United States in 1897. Wester worked in several agricultural offices from 1897 to 1903, including leading the United States Department of Agriculture's experiment station and experimental plots for subtropical plants in Miami.
- Olof B. Widlund, Swedish-American mathematician. He is well known for his leading role in and fundamental contributions to domain decomposition methods

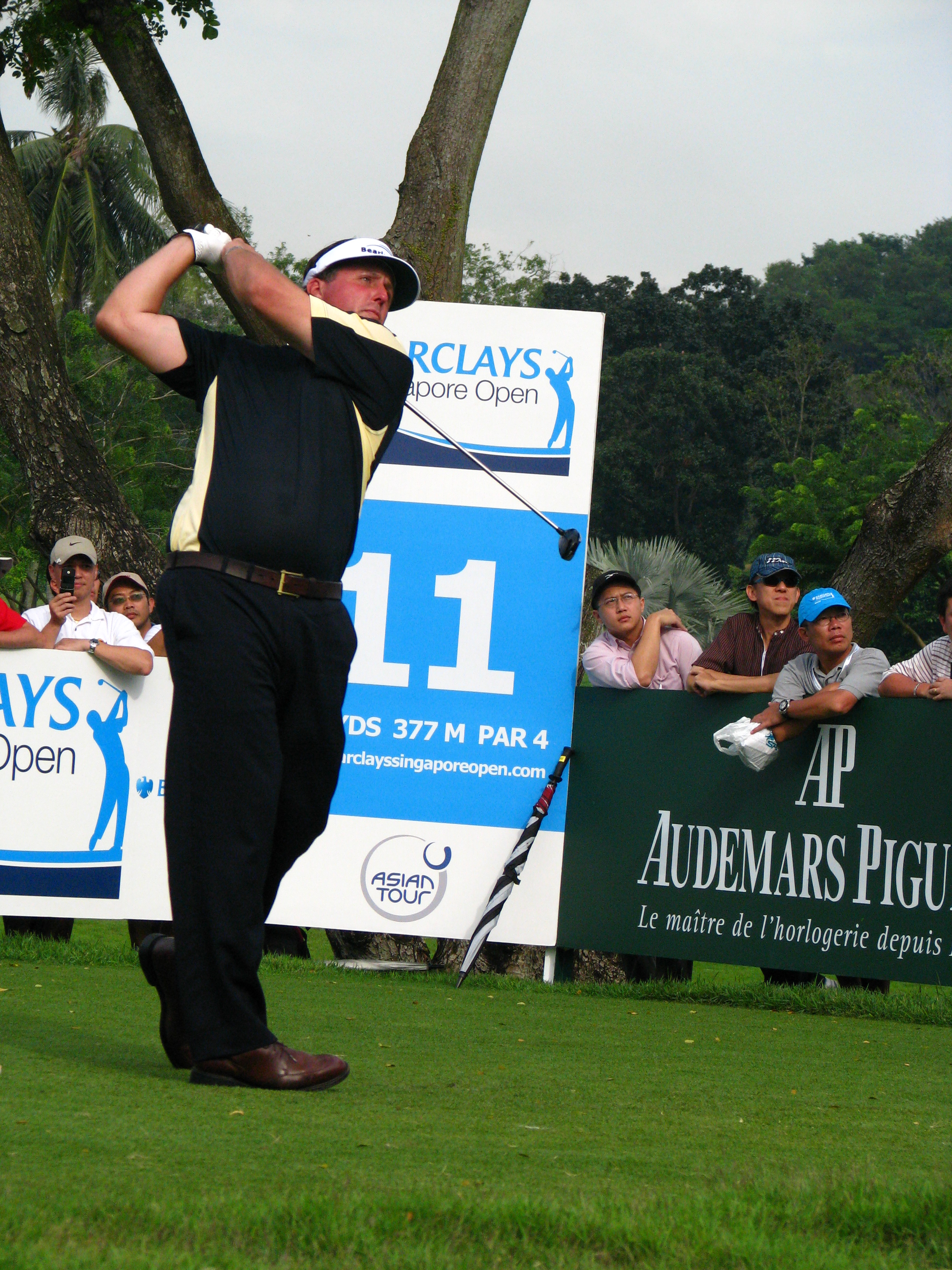
Phil Mickelson

=== Sports ===
- Josh Allen, American football quarterback currently with the Buffalo Bills
- Bob Backlund, American retired professional wrestler with an in-ring career spanning over 30 years.
- Earl W. Bascom, hall of fame rodeo champion, "father of modern rodeo"
- Tom Brady, Former American football quarterback; played with the Tampa Bay Buccaneers, but most famous for his tenure with the New England Patriots
- Lou Amundson, basketball player
- Willie Bloomquist, baseball player
- Ernst Brandsten, diving coach
- Dustin Byfuglien, hockey player
- Bob Burnquist, skateboarder, father is American of Swedish descent
- Swede Carlstrom, Major League shortstop for the Boston Red Sox
- John Carlson, hockey player
- Gary Cederstrom, Major League Baseball umpire
- Armand Duplantis, pole vaulter representing Sweden for international events, Swedish mother
- Dick Enberg, sportscaster
- Norman Julius "Boomer" Esiason, retired American football quarterback, network commentator.
- Nancy Faust, stadium organist for the Chicago White Sox franchise in Major League Baseball
- Ed Gustafson, professional athlete with the Brooklyn Dodgers
- Rudolph Emil Hagberg, American football offensive lineman in the National Football League
- Dorothy Hamill, figure skater
- Matt Hasselbeck, former quarterback of the Seattle Seahawks
- Walter Hellman, draughts player
- Matt Hendricks, NHL winger
- Chet Holmgren, NBA player
- Mike Holmgren, former head coach of the Seattle Seahawks
- Jonas Jerebko, basketball player born to a Russian American father and a Swedish mother.
- Greta Johansson, diver
- Chester Johnston, former professional American football player
- Swede Johnston, football player
- John Kvist, football player
- Gus Lawson, was a record holding professional cyclist who died in a race
- John Lawson, was a Swedish-American professional cyclist known as "The Terrible Swede"
- Iver Lawson, was a world champion cyclist
- Ewa Mataya Laurance, professional pool player
- Edward Lindberg, athlete
- Charlie Lindgren, NHL goaltender
- Ryan Lindgren, NHL defenseman
- Freddie Lindstrom, baseball player
- Matthew Lindstrom, baseball player
- Greg Louganis, diver
- Pug Lund, football player
- Mike Lundin, ice hockey player
- Christopher McVey, soccer player
- Phil Mickelson, American professional golfer
- Jordy Nelson, American football player
- Nils. V. "Swede" Nelson
- Joakim Noah, basketball player
- Bob Nystrom, ice hockey player
- Eric Nystrom, ice hockey player
- Andrew James Oberlander, All-American halfback football player
- Gene Okerlund, "Mean" Gene Okerlund, was an American professional wrestling interviewer, announcer and television host.
- Bobo Olson, Swedish father, boxer
- Charles August Risberg, baseball player
- Ryne Sandberg, baseball player
- Mattias Samuelsson, hockey player, father Kjell is Swedish.
- Ulf Samuelsson, Swedish-born, ice hockey player
- Ted Sundquist, bobsledder and football manager
- Cub Swanson, mixed martial artist
- Evar Swanson, first generation American, born to Swedish immigrants, FASTEST man to circle bases in MLB (Guinness); played Two Sports: 1929-1934 MLB Baseball: Cincinnati Reds and Chicago White Sox; 1924-1927 Football: Rock Island Independents, Milwaukee Badgers, Chicago Cardinals, 16 Letterman at Lombard College (IL)
- Jeffery Taylor, former NBA player; born in Sweden to a Swedish mother and an American father
- Nick Theslof, first American soccer player to play in Europe, grandson of Vivi-Anne Hultén
- Oliver Wahlstrom, ice hockey player, Swedish father
- Adolph Frederick Youngstrom, football player
- Yukon Eric, Eric Holmback, better known as Yukon Eric, was an American professional wrestler.

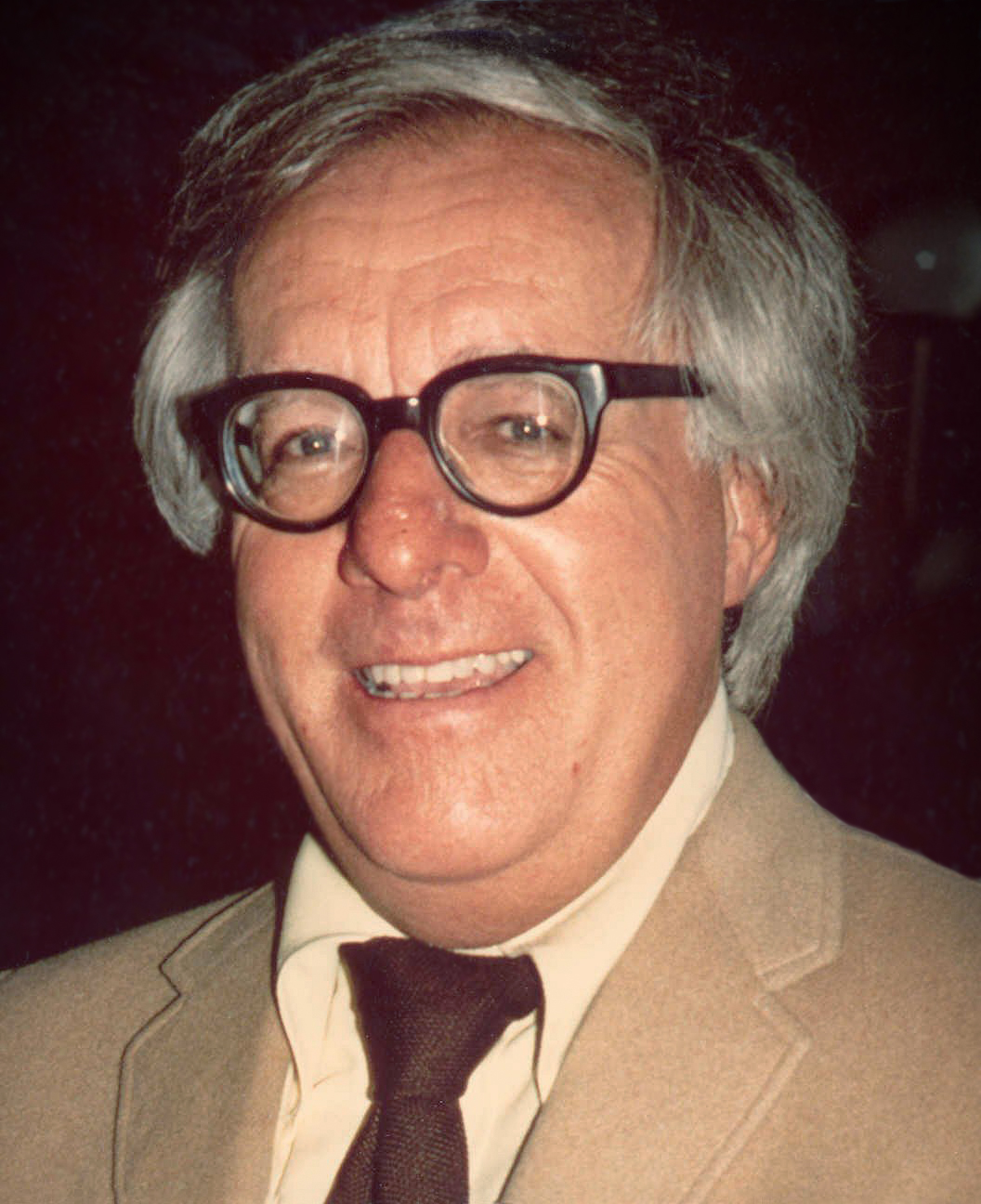
Ray Bradbury

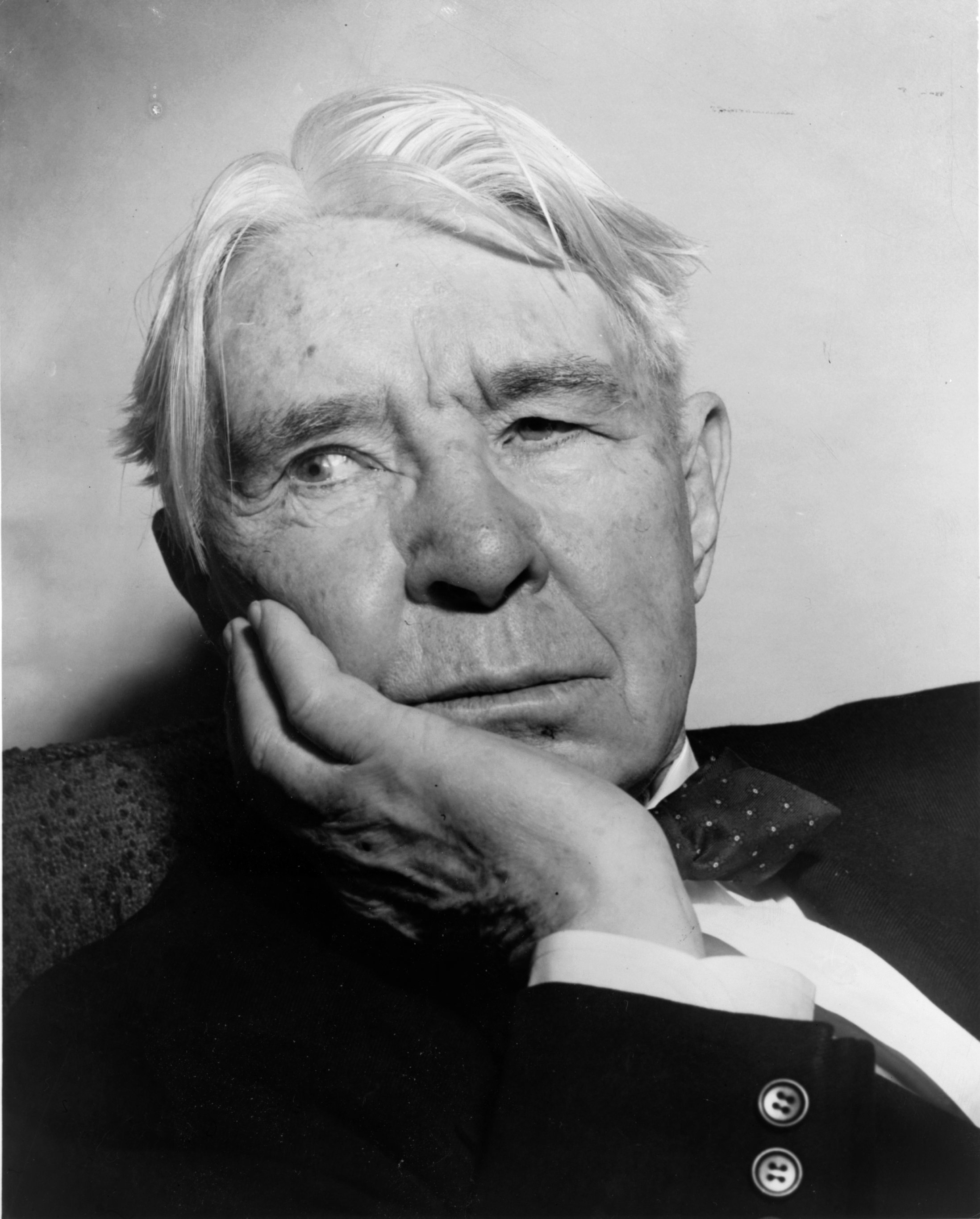
Carl Sandburg

=== Writers ===
- Nelson Algren, writer
- Jack Anderson, journalist
- Ray Bradbury, science fiction and fantasy, mother was an immigrant from Sweden
- Siv Cedering, poet
- Jonathan Franzen, novelist and essayist
- Greg Grandin, Pulitzer Prize-winning historian/author, paternal great-grandparents born in Sweden
- Axel Carl Johan Gustafson, Swedish-born, writer
- Victor Davis Hanson, military historian, columnist, political essayist and former classics
- James Jerpe, Pittsburgh sportswriter with a Swedish immigrant father and second-generation Swedish-American mother
- Gustavo A. Mellander, historian, columnist, political commentator, university administrator, college president; honored by the United States House of Representatives, 1985
- Edita Morris, writer
- Lars-Erik Nelson, political columnist
- Victor Folke Nelson, writer and prison reform advocate
- Sigurd Olson, writer and environmentalist
- Carl Sandburg, poet, historian, novelist, balladeer and folklorist
- Ernst Skarstedt, Swedish-born, first author editor, and newspaper publisher
- Gerald Vizenor, novelist and literary critic

=== Colonial people ===
- Måns Andersson, Swedish-born, resident of New Sweden
- Jonas Bronck, Swedish-born, settler after whom the New York City borough of the Bronx was named
- Sven Gunnarsson, Swedish-born, resident of New Sweden
- Margaret Matson, Swedish-born, resident of New Sweden
- Eric Pålsson Mullica, Swedish-born, resident of New Sweden
- Peter Gunnarsson Rambo, Swedish-born, resident of New Sweden
- Reorus Torkillus, Swedish-born, resident of New Sweden

=== Educators ===
- Alida Anderson, university professor and widely published education researcher
- George Akerlof, economist
- Arnold Barton, educator and historian
- Linda Lee Cadwell, teacher; widow of Bruce Lee
- August Hjalmar Edgren, Swedish-born, linguistics and university professor
- Harold Leroy Enarson, president of Cleveland State University and Ohio State University, maternal Swedish grandmother from Östergötland
- Emory Lindquist, president of Bethany College (1943–1953) in Lindsborg, Kansas and Wichita State University in Wichita, Kansas (1963–1968). He also served as a professor and authored many articles and books, especially regarding Swedish-American history
- Claes Gösta Ryn, academic and educator

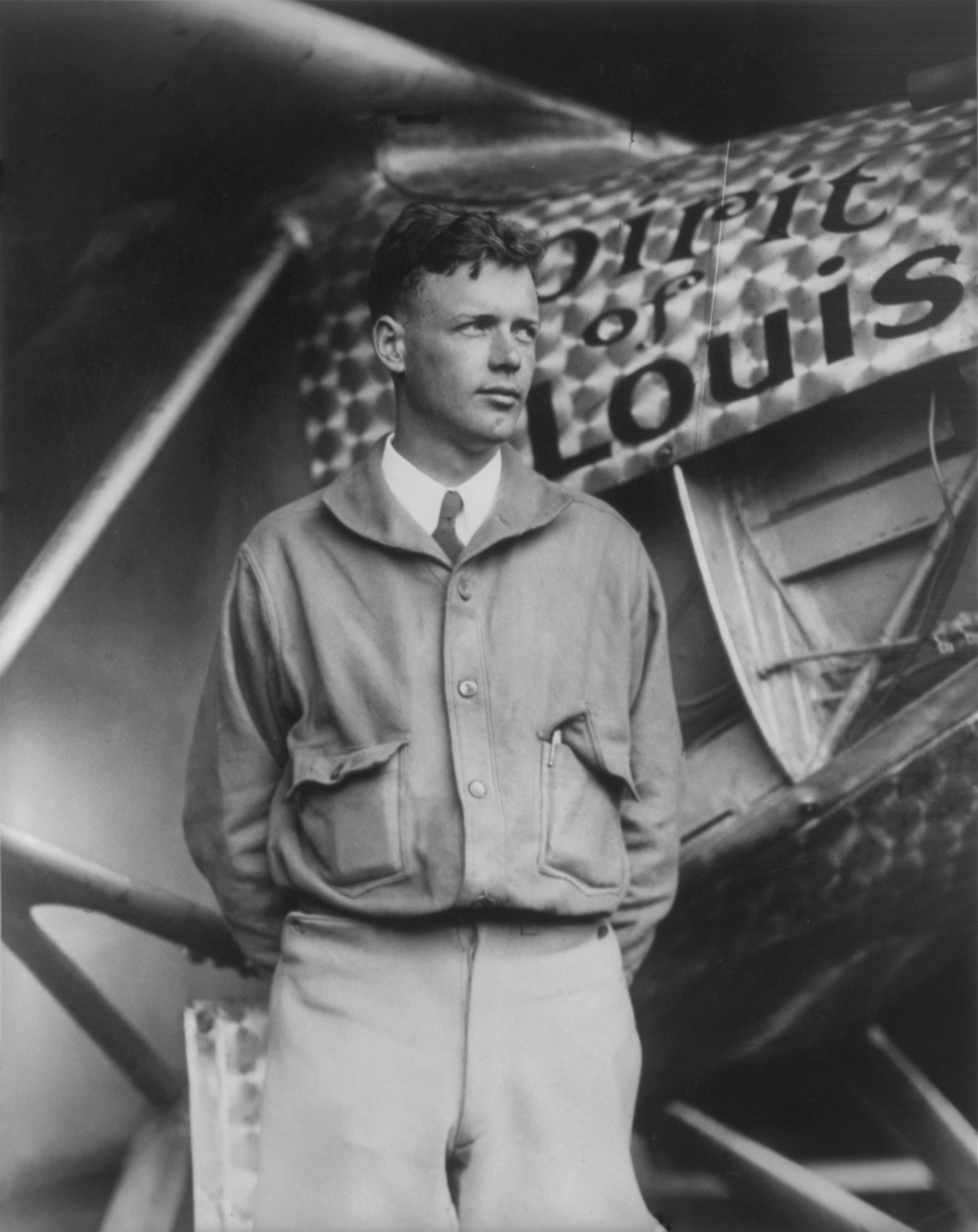
Charles Lindbergh

=== Other ===
- Bob Arno, Swedish-American entertainer, known primarily as a comedy pickpocket, and more recently criminologist specializing in global street crime
- Leroy J. Alexanderson, last captain of the SS United States
- Alfred O. Andersson, publisher
- H. S. "Andy" Anderson, Swedish-American woodcarver, one of the recognized masters of 20th-century woodcarving, most famous for Scandinavian flat-plane style of woodcarving and caricature carving
- Bo Andersson, former General Motors executive, and present President/CEO of GAZ Group
- Lillian Asplund, Titanic survivor
- William Lee Bergstrom, commonly known as The Suitcase Man or Phantom Gambler, was a gambler and high roller known for placing the largest bet in casino gambling history at the time amounting to $777,000 ($2.41 million present day amount) at the Horseshoe Casino, which he won
- Oscar Broneer, prominent Swedish American educator and archaeologist known in particular for his work on Ancient Greece. He is most associated with his discovery of the Temple of Isthmia, an important Panhellenic shrine dating from the seventh century B.C.
- Paul Carlson, American physician and medical missionary who served in Congo. He was killed in 1964 by rebel insurgents after being falsely accused of being an American spy
- Victor Carlstrom, record-holding Swedish-American pioneer aviator. He set a cross-America flight air speed record
- Neil Erickson, Swedish-born American pioneer in Cochise County, Arizona
- Eric Enstrom, Swedish-born American photographer. He became famous for his 1918 photograph of Charles Wilden in Bovey, Minnesota. The photo is now known as "Grace" and depicts Wilden saying a prayer over a simple meal
- Axel Erlandson, Swedish American farmer who shaped trees as a hobby, and opened a horticultural attraction in 1947 called "The Tree Circus"
- Frank Erickson, Arnold Rothstein's right-hand man and New York's largest bookmaker during the 1930s and 40s
- Febold Feboldson, American folk hero who was a Swedish American plainsman and cloudbuster from Nebraska
- Abraham Fornander, journalist, judge and ethnologist
- Franklin S. Forsberg, publisher and diplomat
- Nicholas Gustafson, Swedish immigrant who was mortally wounded in the James–Younger Gang bank raid in Northfield, Minnesota
- Olof Hanson, first deaf American architect
- Eric A. Hegg, Swedish-American photographer who portrayed the people in Skagway, Bennett and Dawson City during the Klondike Gold Rush from 1897 to 1901
- Olof Jonsson, Swedish-born engineer and psychic, famous for his long-distance telepathy experiment during the Apollo 14 mission in 1971
- Gary Larson, Swedish-American cartoonist. He is the creator of The Far Side, a single-panel cartoon series
- Charles Lindbergh, pioneering aviator famous for piloting the first solo non-stop flight across the Atlantic Ocean in 1927
- Erik Lindbergh, aviator
- Godfrey Lundberg, Swedish-born, engraver
- Jon Lindbergh, former underwater diver from the United States. He has worked as a United States Navy demolition expert and as a commercial diver, and was one of the world's earliest aquanauts in the 1960s. He was also a pioneer in cave diving. He is the oldest surviving child of aviator Charles Lindbergh
- Raymond Nels Nelson, Chief of Staff Senator Claiborne Pell, R.I., former Bureau Chief, Providence Journal, unsolved murder 1981
- Frank Olson, biochemist, he was covertly given LSD in the CIA's MKUltra program
- Sigurd F. Olson, author, environmentalist, and advocate for the protection of wilderness
- Ingrid Pedersen, Swedish-American aviator; first female pilot to fly over the North Pole
- Buell Halvor Quain, ethnologist
- Eric P. Quain, Swedish-born physician who co-founded the Quain and Ramstad Clinic in Bismarck, North Dakota. He also served as head of surgical services in France for the United States Army during World War I.
- Tom Rolf, Swedish-born American film editor who worked on at least 48 feature films in a career spanning over fifty years. Famous for editing Taxi Driver by Martin Scorsese.
- Calvin Rutstrum, author of wilderness camping experiences and techniques books
- Olaf Swenson, Seattle-based fur trader and adventurer active in Siberia and Alaska in the first third of the 20th century. His career intersected with activities of notable explorers of the period, and with the Russian Civil War. He is credited with leading the rescue of the Karluk survivors from Wrangel Island in 1914
- Ivor Thord-Gray, Swedish-born, adventurer, ethnologist and linguist
- Jon Winroth, American wine critic who wrote for The New York Times
- Valentin Wolfenstein, Swedish-American photographer who worked both in Stockholm and Los Angeles, California; one of the first photographers to use flash-lamps for photography

== See also ==
- List of Swedes
