= Quain =

Surname

Quain is a surname. Notable people with the surname include:

- Buell Quain (1912–1939), American ethnologist
- Eric P. Quain (1870–1962), American physician
- Fannie Almara Quain (1874–1950), American family physician
- John Richard Quain (1816–1876), Irish barrister and judge
- Jones Quain (1796–1865), Irish anatomist
- Kevin Quain, Canadian musician
- Richard Quain (Irish physician) (1816–1898), Irish physician
- Richard Quain (1800–1887), English anatomist and surgeon

== See also ==
- An Examination of the Work of Herbert Quain, a 1941 short story by Argentine writer Jorge Luis Borges
- Quain Professor, the professorship title for certain disciplines at University College, London, England
