= Robert F. Murphy (anthropologist) =

American anthropologist (1924–1990)

- Born: March 3, 1924; Far Rockaway, Queens, New York City, U.S.
- Died: October 8, 1990 (aged 66); Leonia, New Jersey
- Awards: Guggenheim Fellowship (1968)

Academic background
- Education: Columbia University (BA, PhD)

Academic work
- Discipline: Anthropology
- Institutions: University of California, Berkeley; Columbia University
- Notable students: Ashraf Ghani

Robert Francis Murphy (March 3, 1924 – October 8, 1990) was an American anthropologist and professor of anthropology at Columbia University in New York City, from the early 1960s to 1990. His field work included studies of the Munduruku (Mundurucu) people of the Amazon and the Tuareg people of the Sahara.

== Family, education, career ==
Murphy, a Far Rockaway, Queens native, was a third-generation descendant of Irish immigrants. Raised in a "lace-curtain Irish" neighborhood, his mother, battling breast cancer, raised him and his four siblings single-handedly, while their father was largely absent. His mother died when Bob was 14.

He enlisted in the United States Navy during World War II, serving as a private. He used the G.I. Bill to attend Columbia College as an undergraduate, graduating in 1949. Murphy went on to earn his Master of Arts and PhD in anthropology at Columbia University. He met his wife Yolanda in a physical anthropology course in graduate school, and they were married in St. Paul's Chapel at Columbia University.

In 1952 the Murphys set out to do fieldwork for a year among the Munduruku of the Amazon rainforest in Brazil, where they studied, among other things, the dynamics of a patrilineal society with matrilocal residence patterns. Bob taught at the University of California, Berkeley for several years before taking a professorship at Columbia. In the early 1960s, Bob and Yolanda, with their two small children Robert and Pamela in tow, trekked to the Sahara to undertake a second fieldwork among the Tuareg of Niger, where Bob, who was fond of paradoxes, was able to study a matrilineal society with patrilocal residence patterns.

Murphy died of heart failure on October 8, 1990, at his home in Leonia, New Jersey. He was survived by his wife Yolanda and their two children.

== Scholarly contributions to anthropology ==
A student of Julian Steward's cultural ecology approach in his early years, Murphy was an eclectic thinker who engaged Marx, Freud, Hegel, Simmel, and Schutz, and who incorporated ideas from diverse areas of anthropology theory — materialist, structuralist, and symbolic. Murphy wrote numerous articles and books, including:

- The Trumai Indians of Central Brazil (Monographs of the American Ethnological Society) (1955) (based upon field notes of Buell Quain)
- Tappers and Trappers: Parallel Process in Acculturation (1956) Economic Development and Cultural Change 4.
- Matrilocality and Patrilineality in Mundurucu Society. American Anthropologist (1956) Vol. 58 (3:3): 414–433
- Mundurucu Religion (University of California Publications in American Archaeology and Ethnology) (1958)
- The Structure of Parallel Cousin Marriage (1959)
- Headhunter's Heritage: Social and Economic Change Among the Mundurucu Indians (1960)
- Social Distance and the Veil (about Tuareg men's veiling practices) (1964)
- The Dialectics of Social Life: Alarms and Excursions in Anthropological Theory (1971)
- Robert H. Lowie (Leaders of Modern Anthropology) (1972)
- Evolution and Ecology: Essays on Social Transformation (1978, co-authored with Julian H. Steward and Jane C. Steward)
- American Anthropology, 1946–1970: Papers from the American Anthropologist (2002)
- Women of the Forest (1974), co-authored with Yolanda (first author), now in a 30th anniversary edition (2004)

Margaret Mead called Women of the Forest "a salute to women's liberation in a portrait of a fascinating primitive people."

== Disability ==
In 1974, Murphy was diagnosed as having a benign but slow-growing tumor of the spinal cord that would unrelentingly lead to impairment of his central nervous system and greater loss of bodily functions over the next 16 years of his life; within two years, by 1976, he was quadriplegic and used a wheelchair full-time. Murphy had the "rage to live", and began to edit his popular lectures on cultural anthropology for a new textbook, Overture to Social Anthropology (1979), later revised into second (1986) and third (1989) editions before he died. Murphy dramatically transformed his scholarly efforts into an anthropological study of paraplegia, a major project funded by the National Science Foundation, which he wrote about in his ethnography of "the damaged self", The Body Silent: The Different World of the Disabled (1987, 1990, 2001), which won the Columbia University Lionel Trilling Award.

== Teaching style ==
According to the cited source, Murphy taught large undergraduate classes at Columbia University. He continued teaching despite his disability, using a motorized wheelchair and a microphone. He received several teaching and academic awards and was named a Fellow of the John Simon Guggenheim Memorial Foundation in 1968.

== Other publications ==
Murphy, Robert F.

- 1970 Basin Ethnography and Ecological Theory. In Language and Culture of Western North America: Essays in Honor of Sven S. Liljeblad, edited by Earl H. Swanson Jr., pp. 152–171. Pocatello: Idaho State University Press.
- 1977 Introduction: The Anthropological Theories of Julian H. Steward. In Evolution and Ecology: Essays on Social Transformation, edited by Jane Cannon Steward and R.F. Murphy, pp. 1–40. Urbana: University of Illinois Press.
- 1981 Julian Steward. In Totems and Teachers, edited by Sydel Silverman, pp. 171–204. New York: Columbia University Press.
- 1981 (Book Review) The Way of the Shaman: A Guide to Power and Healing by Michael Harner. Review author[s]: Robert Murphy

American Anthropologist, New Series, Vol. 83, No. 3 (Sep. 1981), pp. 714–717

- 1986 Social Structure and Sex Antagonism. Journal of Anthropological Research 42 (1986), 407–416.
- 1987 American Anthropology. In Perspectives in Cultural Anthropology, edited by Herbert Applebaum. Albany: State University of New York Press.

Murphy, Robert, and Yolanda Murphy

- 1960 Shoshone-Bannock Subsistence and Society. University of California Anthropological Records. Berkeley: University of California Press, 16(7):293–338.
- 1986 Northern Shoshone and Bannock. In Handbook of North American Indians: 11. Great Basin, edited by Warren L. d'Azevedo, pp. 284–307. Washington, D.C.: Smithsonian Institution. Fried, Morton, Marvin Harris, and Robert Murphy, eds.
- 1967 War: The Anthropology of Armed Conflict and Aggression. Garden City, New York: Natural History Press.
