= The Body Silent =

The Body Silent is a personal narrative written by Robert Murphy, a professor at Columbia University. This piece is a narrative of personal struggle through a spinal condition, published in 1987 by Henry Holt and Company, Inc. He uses this narrative to tell his journey through a deteriorating spinal condition leading to paraplegia. He was diagnosed with a tumor extending from his second cervical vertebra to the eighth thoracic vertebra in 1972. Through his narrative he tells his medical history and how the diagnosis of old medicine (late 1920s) knew very little about neurology, and left undetected problems which created a new issue in his 50s. As an anthropology professor at Columbia University, he applies his field to his medical journey. "This book was conceived in the realization that my long illness with a disease of the spinal cord has been a kind of extended anthropological field trip, for through it I have sojourned in a social world no less strange to me at first than those of the Amazon forests. And since it is the duty of all anthropologists to report on their travels . . . this is my accounting." Due to funded research of his medical experiences and conditions, he provides the readers with a description and explanation of what he deals with, plus a constant discussion of future possibility and his mindset throughout.

== Production ==
The National Science Foundation funded production of the book, and it was published by Holt.

== Genre ==
Metapathography pieces are not stories and tales of sickness, but a professional self-analysis and in-depth writing of ones personal state. Although metapathography is not a classified genre, other authors and professionals who reviewed his material defined it set aside from a personal narrative, due to his thorough analysis of mental and physical condition.

== Biography ==
Robert Murphy was born on March 3, 1924, in Far Rockaway, New York. He was studious and became a distinguished anthropologist and professor of anthropology at Columbia University in New York City, from the early 1960s to 1990. He studied many different cultures across the globe, such as the Mundurucu of the Amazon and tribes in the Sahara. At the age of 66, he died in his home in Leonia, New Jersey.

=== Medical History ===
In 1928, Murphy lost the use of his leg. A house doctor diagnosed him with "a touch of rheumatism" which took him two weeks to recover from. Murphy began to experience muscle spasms in his anus, and in his lower abdomen in 1972, and soon had trouble urinating. He was then diagnosed with an anal fissure, meaning of a slight break in the muscle. After a few years of symptoms, he visited a neurologist and was diagnosed with a benign but slowly growing tumor in the upper part of his spinal cord. Within two years his central nervous system was severely damaged, and he lost control of most bodily functions.

== Awards ==
In 1987, the book was awarded the Columbia University's Lionel Trilling Award.
