= Yolanda Murphy =

Polish-born American cultural anthropologist

- Yolanda Murphy, from her 1952 Brazilian immigration card
- Born: April 10, 1925; Warsaw, Poland
- Died: June 3, 2016; Medford, Oregon, U.S.
- Occupation: Anthropologist

Yolanda Murphy (née Bukowska, April 10, 1925 – June 3, 2016) was a Polish-born American cultural anthropologist who was the co-author of classic anthropology text Women of the Forest with her husband, Robert F. Murphy. This text was based on field work done in 1952 among the Mundurucu Indians of the Amazon rainforest in Brazil.

== Early life and education ==
Yolanda V. Bukowska was born in Warsaw, Poland on April 10, 1925, the daughter of Walter Bukowski and Clementine Borowski Bukowska. When she was still a young child, she and her widowed mother moved to the United States. Her mother worked as a dress designer in New York City.

== Career ==
The Murphys did extensive field work in Brazil in 1952, in preparation for writing their best-known work, the classic text Women of the Forest (1974). They also did work in the western United States in the 1950s, among the Shoshone and Bannock peoples, in connection with a land claims case. She taught at Empire State College (SUNY).

== Publications ==
- Shoshone-Bannock Subsistence and Society (1960, with Robert F. Murphy)
- Women of the Forest (1974, with Robert F. Murphy)
- "Women, work, and property in a South African tribe" (1980, with Robert F. Murphy)
- "Physical disability and social liminality: A study in the rituals of adversity" (1988, with Robert F. Murphy, Jessica Scheer, and Richard Mack)
- "Women's Day among the Mundurucu" (1993, with Robert F. Murphy)

== Personal life ==
Bukowska met her husband Robert F. Murphy while they were graduate students in at Columbia University. They married in 1950, and had two children, Pamela and Robert. Her husband was paralyzed by a spinal tumor in 1975, and he died in 1990; she died in Medford, Oregon on June 3, 2016, at the age of 91.
