= Estwing =

American manufacturer of hammers, axes and other tools

- Type: Private
- Industry: Manufacturing
- Founded: Rockford, Illinois, United States (1923)
- Founder: Ernest O. Estwing
- Headquarters: Rockford, Illinois, United States
- Products: Striking tools
- Website: www.estwing.com

Estwing Manufacturing Company is an American manufacturer of hammers, axes, and other tools, founded by Swedish immigrant Ernest O. Estwing in 1923. The company is headquartered in Rockford, Illinois.

== History and products ==
Estwing Manufacturing Company was founded in Rockford, Illinois in 1923 by Ernest O. Estwing. Estwing was an immigrant from Sweden who settled in Rockford with many other Swedish immigrants.

Estwing manufactures striking tools such as hammers, axes, pry bars, bricklayer's tools, roofer's tools, geologist's hammers, and various specialty striking tools. Estwing products are constructed of a single piece of hardened tool steel.

== Estwing Awards ==
Estwing offers prizes to students at various colleges throughout the country, such as the Estwing Award for most outstanding graduate student at Cornell University, the Estwing Outstanding Senior Geologist Award at Colorado College, and the Estwing Hammer Prize to an outstanding geology graduate student at Yale Graduate School of Arts and Sciences.

== Gallery ==
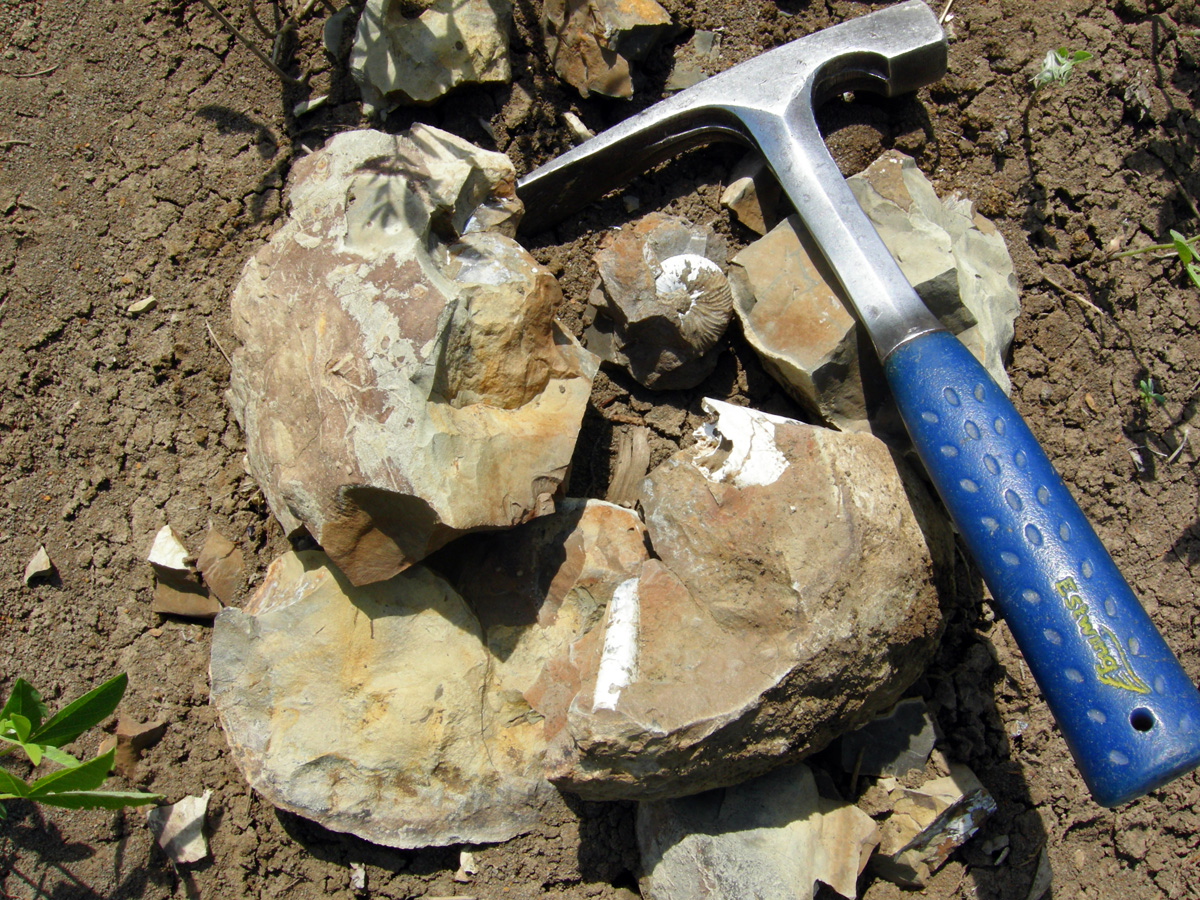
Estwing geologist's hammer in two typical uses: breaking up rocks and as a photographic scale

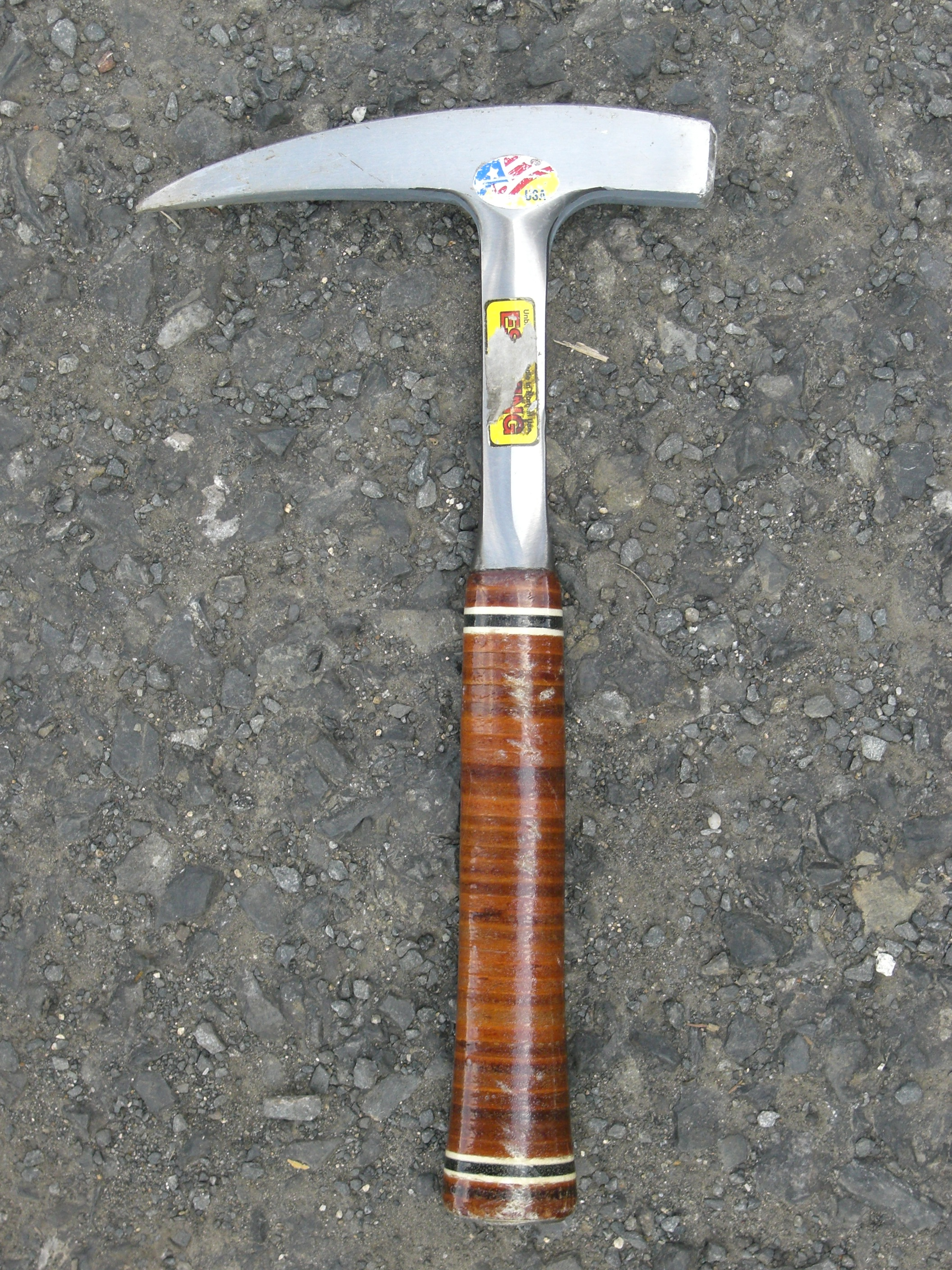
An Estwing geologist's hammer by itself.

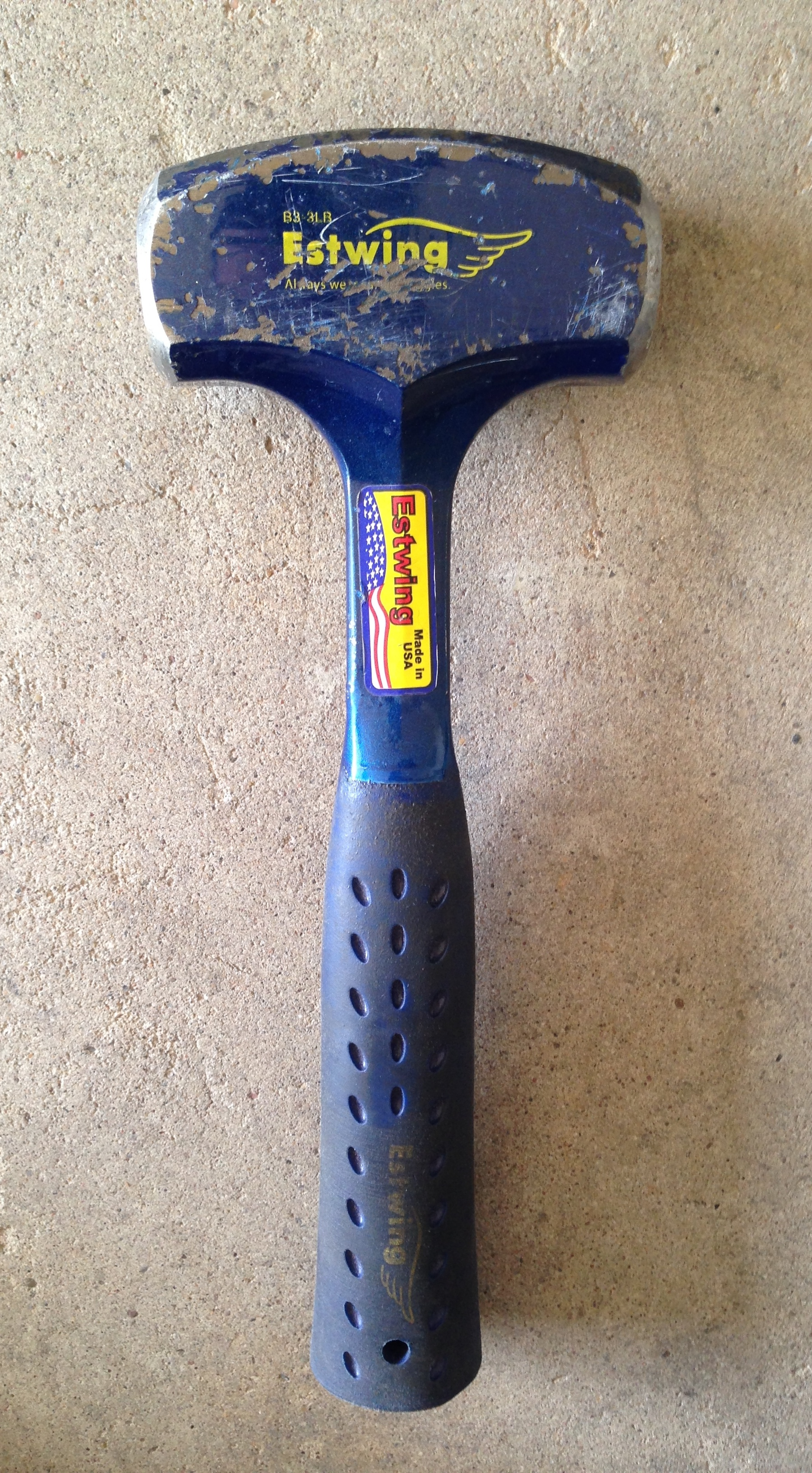
An Estwing drilling hammer.

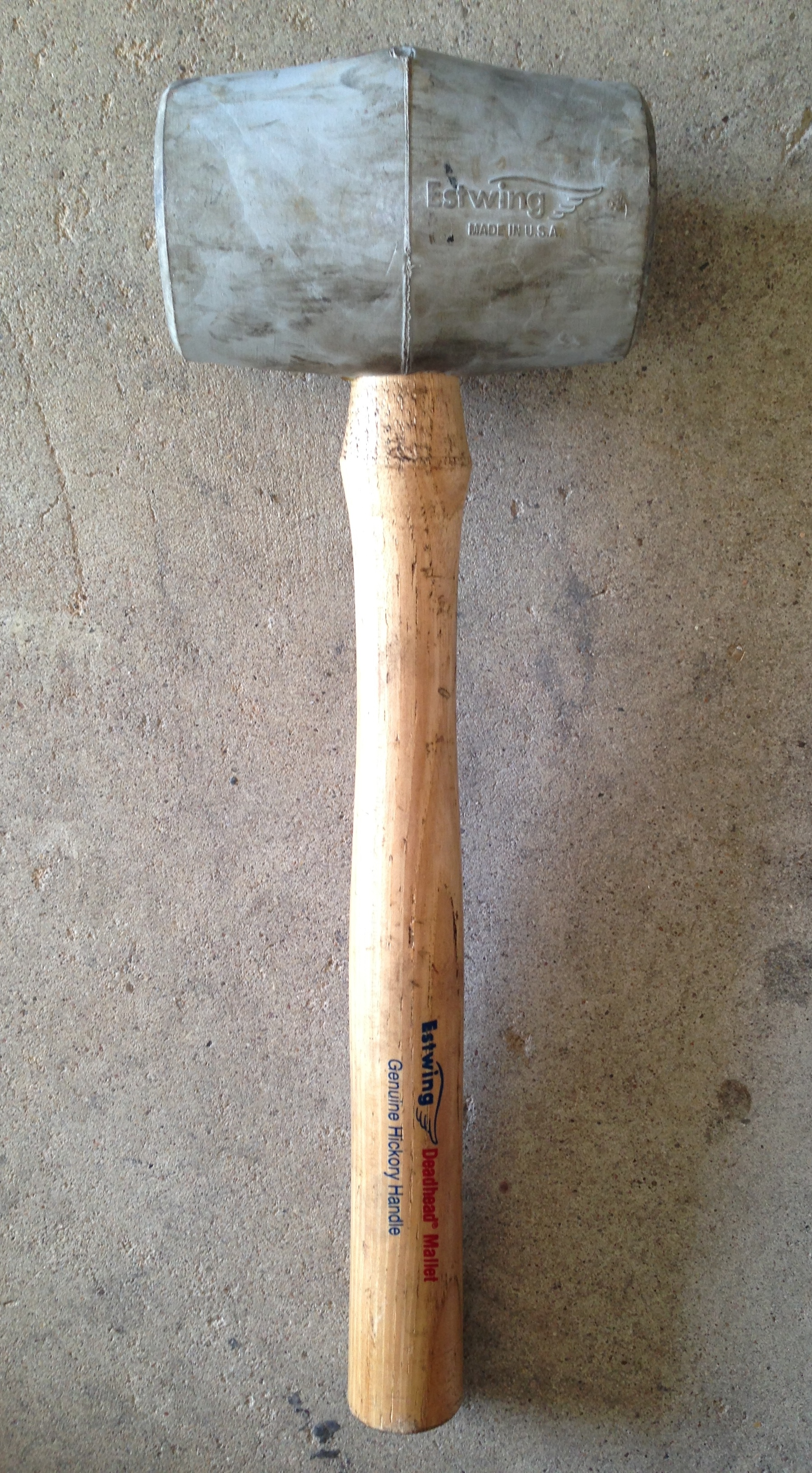
An Estwing "Deadhead" mallet (with hickory handle).

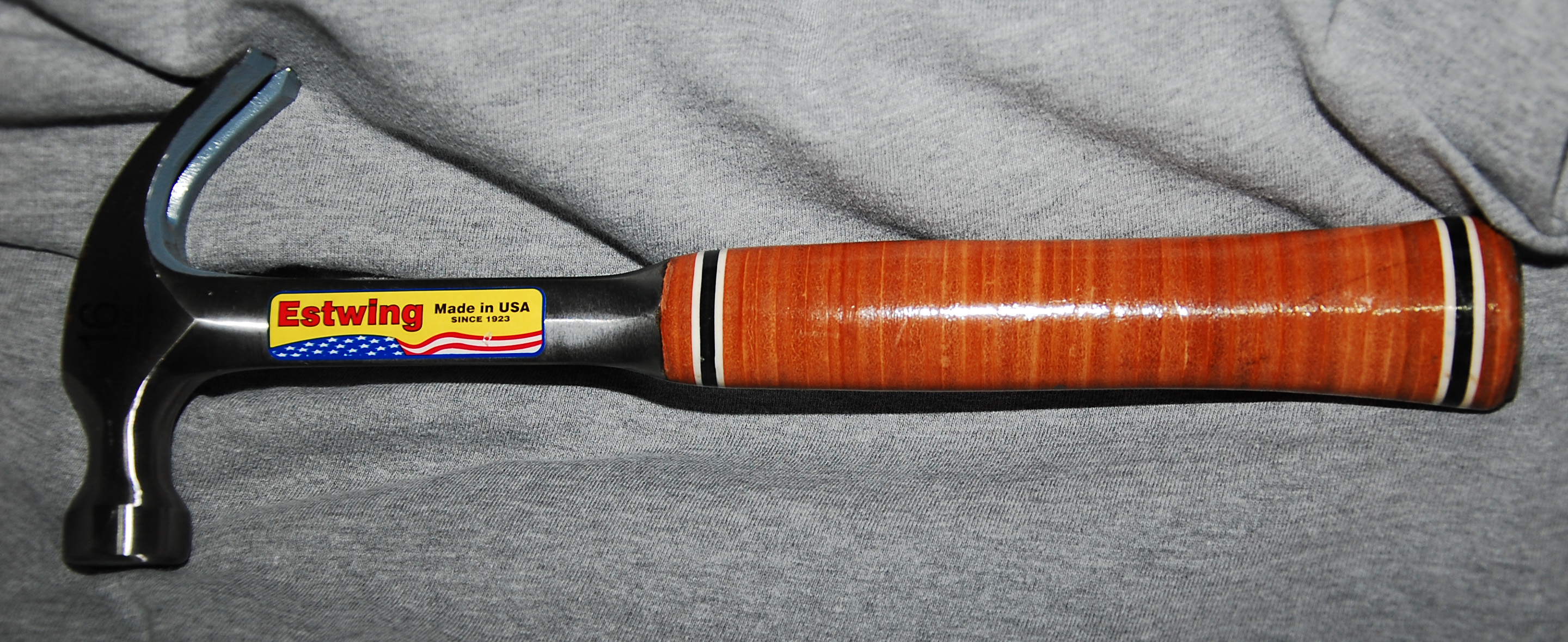
Classic Estwing claw hammer with leather-wrapped handle
