= Eric P. Quain =

American physician and surgeon (1870 – 1962)

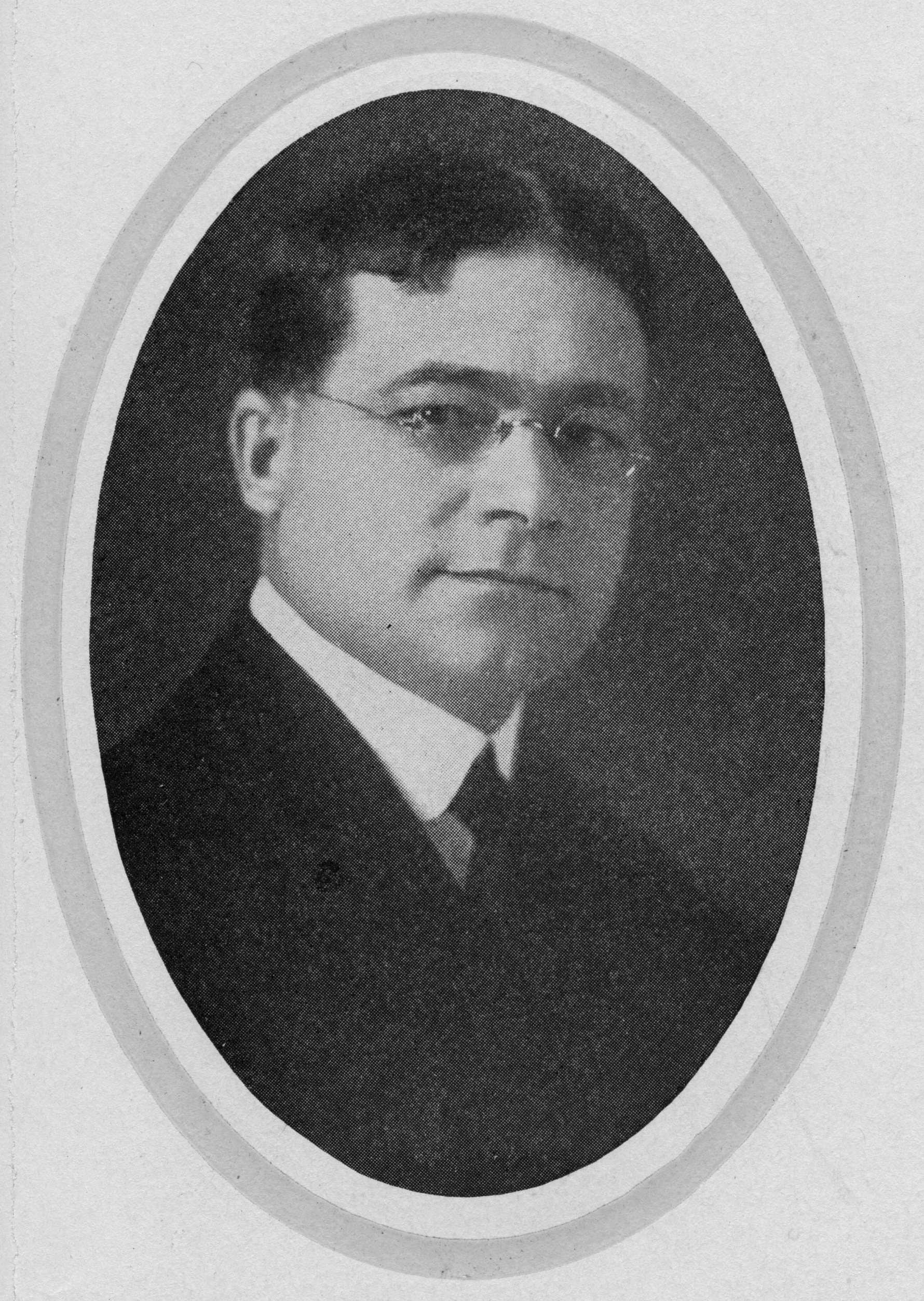
- Born: August 22, 1870; Sweden
- Died: September 11, 1962 (aged 92); Oregon, U.S.
- Occupation: Physician
- Known for: Co-founding the Quain and Ramstad Clinic
- Spouses: Fannie D. Quain, Hilda Quain

Eric Peer Quain (August 22, 1870 – September 11, 1962) was a prominent physician and surgeon in Bismarck, North Dakota, and co-founder of the Quain and Ramstad Clinic (also known as the Q & R Clinic).

== Early life ==
Eric P. Quain was born as Eric P. Qven on August 22, 1870, in Sweden. At the age of 18, Quain immigrated to the United States, following the sudden death of his father and the remarriage of his mother. He came to Minnesota where he had relatives.

== Career ==
Quain completed medical school in 1898 and had an internship at the City and County Hospital in Saint Paul, Minnesota. In 1899, after the completion of his internship, Quain moved to Bismarck, North Dakota. Soon after arriving in Bismarck, Quain was met with skepticism from local physicians and medical staff about his views on asepsis, which had not yet gained widespread use in the area. He also ran into issues with Alexander McKenzie, who was known as the "political boss" of North Dakota. In 1902, Dr. Quain, along with Dr. Niles O. Ramstad, formed the Quain and Ramstad Clinic in Bismarck, which is considered the second-oldest medical clinic in the United States.

Throughout his career, Dr. Quain was a constant student. He continually studied medicine and languages. He wrote and presented numerous medical papers. He is credited with being one of the founders of the American College of Surgeons. Also, in 1922, he was elected president of the North Dakota Medical Association.

He was also involved with the Merchants State Bank in Bismarck.

== Military ==
During World War I, Dr. Quain organized a team of doctors and nurses from North Dakota to go to France. He enlisted in the Officers Reserve Corps in April 1917. He was called into active service on October 31, 1917. He was commissioned a major and assigned to Medical Corps. He was made head of surgical services in France for the United States Army. Dr. Quain was overseas from August 22, 1918, to February 9, 1919, and he was part of the Meuse-Argonne offensive. Dr. Quain was discharged at Fort Snelling, Minnesota, on August 1, 1919, as a lieutenant colonel.

== Personal life ==
In 1903, Dr. Quain married Fannie Dunn, who was also a physician and a prominent citizen of Bismarck. Dr. Eric P. Quain and Dr. Fannie D. Quain had two children. They later divorced. In 1940, Dr. Quain was remarried to Hilda Gustafson, who served as the supervisor of the operating room at the Bismarck Hospital. Also in 1940, Dr. Quain retired and moved to Oregon. Dr. Quain died on September 11, 1962, at the age of 92. He is buried at Sunset Memorial Gardens in Bismarck, North Dakota.
