= David Oscarson =

American sculptor (born 1966)

- Known for: Sculpture, Pen design
- Website: davidoscarson.com

David Oscarson (born 1966) is an American sculptor known for his elaborate, eponymous fountain pen designs.

Oscarson grew up in Stockholm, Sweden. He began his career in the diamond business and later worked in the retail industry, but started his luxury pen company to 'create something beautiful that would last for generations'.

== Career ==
He began creating luxury fountain pens in 2000 when he released the Henrik Wigstrom Trophy pen collection. Among the numerous historical figures honored with Oscarson designs is Alexander Fleming, the Scottish bacteriologist best known for discovering penicillin.

Oscarson pens are unique in part because of the combination of design and materials that include 18-karat gold, .925 sterling silver, and hard enamel. Some design techniques prove to be incredibly intricate and time-consuming. The Koi collection uses hand-rendered guilloché and hard enamel and the pen components are fired in a furnace at temperatures exceeding 1,000 °F, fusing the enamel to the metal and forming a layer of glass. Oscarson personally designs the entire Collection, incorporating precision and artistic mastery of his British goldsmiths and silversmiths.

== Personal life ==
Oscarson lives in Wildwood, Missouri. He is a member of the Church of Jesus Christ of Latter-day Saints and one collection, The Tree of Life, has reference to Biblical and Book of Mormon imagery.
