= San Haven State Hospital =

Sanatorium in North Dakota, United States

Coordinates: 48°50′05″N 100°02′20″W

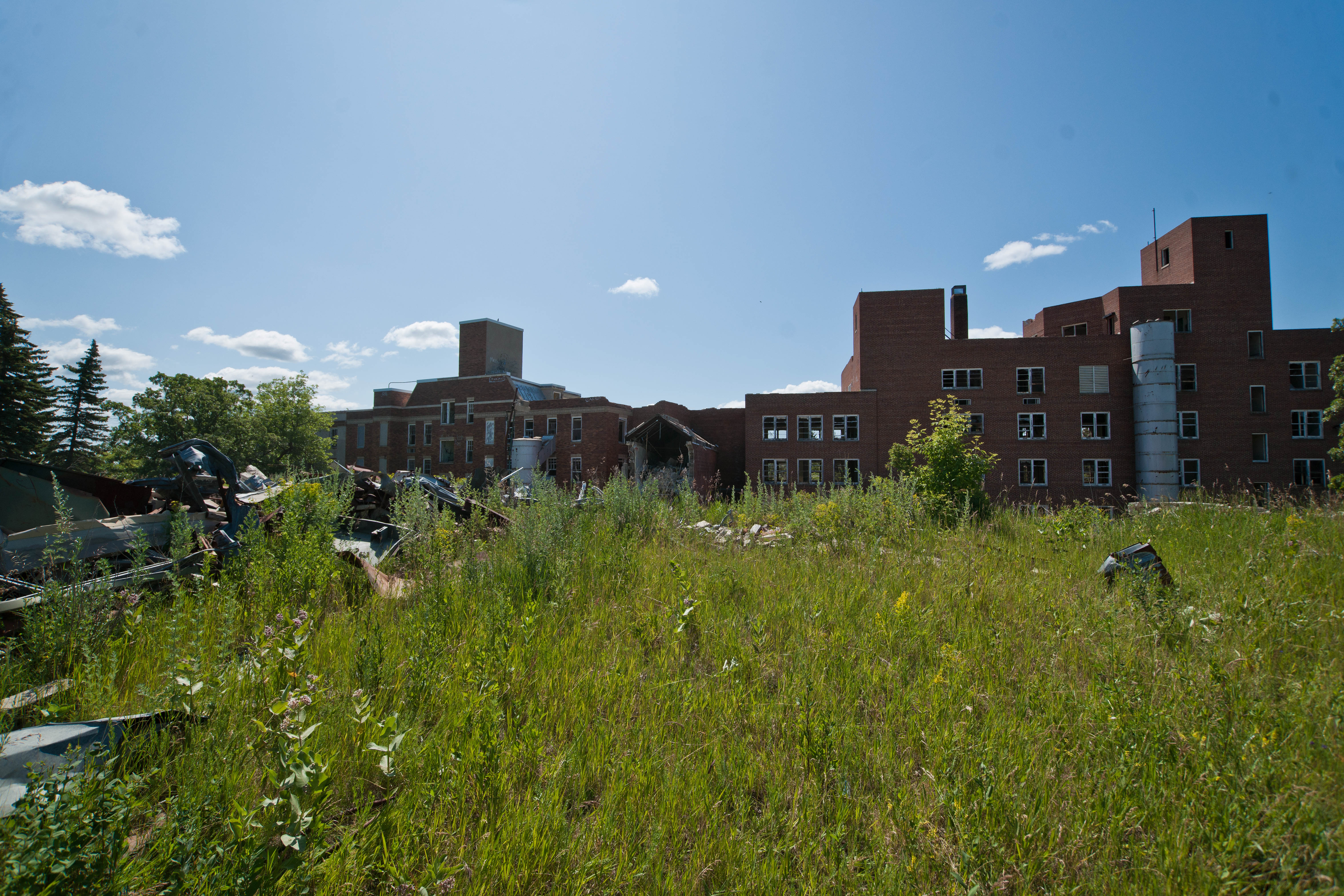
Overview of the former hospital building in 2009

San Haven State Hospital was a hospital and sanatorium located northeast of Dunseith, North Dakota. Founded in 1909 as the North Dakota Tuberculosis Sanitarium, it began accepting patients in November 1912 and initially treated people with tuberculosis. The facility later provided care for people with developmental disabilities before closing in 1987.

== History ==
Physicians Fannie Dunn Quain and James Grassick established the North Dakota Tuberculosis Association in 1909 and advocated for the creation of a state-run tuberculosis sanatorium. Their efforts helped secure state funding for the institution that became San Haven. The North Dakota Legislative Assembly authorized the establishment of a state tuberculosis sanatorium in 1909. A site near Dunseith was selected in 1911. The site, on the southern slope of the Turtle Mountains, was chosen in part because its elevation, relatively low snowfall, and dry atmosphere were considered favorable for the treatment of tuberculosis. The institution began accepting patients in November 1912.

In 1909, the North Dakota Legislative Assembly authorized the establishment of a state tuberculosis sanatorium. A site near Dunseith was selected in 1911, and the institution began accepting patients in November 1912.

The first building at the sanatorium was the Administration Building, which included a dining room, kitchen, laundry, offices, laboratory, staff living quarters, and accommodations for 18 patients. The first patient was admitted in November 1912.

During the first 18 months of operation, San Haven admitted 170 patients and developed a waiting list. In response to the demand, three patient cottages were constructed in 1913: the Men’s Cottage, the State Cottage for Women, and the Masonic Cottage. A separate cottage for staff members was also constructed that year.

In 1915, the sanatorium expanded with the construction of a cottage for the superintendent and his family, a dairy barn, and the Refractory Building. The Refractory Building contained a new kitchen, dining hall, assembly room, and employee dormitory.

Children with tuberculosis were also treated at San Haven and initially stayed in the Administration Building with adult patients. In 1915, the North Dakota Anti-Tuberculosis Association raised funds to establish an open-air school at the sanatorium. The school opened on January 1, 1916, with eight students and operated on an open-air porch of the Administration Building.

In 1920, an infirmary was constructed to accommodate the growing number of patients, adding 60 beds to the sanatorium. An addition to the infirmary was completed in 1927, providing another 80 beds.

A separate Children’s Building was completed in 1927, providing dedicated accommodations for young tuberculosis patients. The building included classrooms, allowing children to continue their education while receiving treatment at the sanatorium.

In 1930, a nurses’ residence was constructed to house nurses and other female employees at the sanatorium. During the 1930s, physicians at San Haven performed surgical procedures intended to rest affected lungs, while patients continued to receive care that included prolonged exposure to fresh air.

The development of antibiotics during the 1940s changed tuberculosis treatment at San Haven. On July 1, 1949, the sanatorium began using antibiotics to treat tuberculosis. As these treatments became more effective, the number of beds in use at San Haven declined substantially by 1958.

As the need for tuberculosis beds declined, San Haven began admitting residents from the overcrowded Grafton State School in 1957. The following year, additional residents were transferred to San Haven, beginning the institution’s transition from tuberculosis treatment to the care of people with developmental disabilities.

In 1961, the section of San Haven housing residents transferred from Grafton officially became part of the Grafton State School. During the 1960s, the Grafton and San Haven facilities together served approximately 1,300 people daily as the institutional population reached its peak.

In 1969, administration of San Haven was transferred to the newly created office of the Director of Institutions. In 1971, the institution was referred to as San Haven State Hospital. In 1973, San Haven became a division of the Grafton State School, with the superintendent of Grafton also serving as superintendent of San Haven.

In 1973, responsibility for the care of tuberculosis patients was transferred to the North Dakota State Department of Health. Tuberculosis treatment at San Haven was subsequently phased out, leaving the facility primarily responsible for the care of people with developmental disabilities.

In 1980, the Association for Retarded Citizens of North Dakota filed a class-action lawsuit concerning treatment and conditions at the Grafton State School and San Haven. The resulting court orders required changes in the care of residents and increased the use of community-based services.

=== Closure ===
San Haven State Hospital closed in December 1987. The remaining residents were transferred either to community-based services or to the Grafton State School. The state vacated the San Haven buildings by 1989.

The state vacated the San Haven buildings in 1989. In 1991, the North Dakota Legislative Association authorized the sale, lease, exchange, or transfer of the property. The Turtle Mountain Band of Chippewa purchased the San Haven property from the state in 1992.

=== Post-closure ===
After acquiring San Haven, the Turtle Mountain Band of Chippewa Indians pursued plans to redevelop the property. The site remained largely vacant, however, and the buildings deteriorated and were affected by vandalism. In 1998, the tribe received a $200,000 grant from the United States Environmental Protection Agency to assess environmental contamination at the property.

In 2021, the United States Environmental Protection Agency awarded the Turtle Mountain Band of Chippewa Indians a $500,000 Brownfields cleanup grant for eight buildings at the San Haven complex. The vacant buildings contained asbestos, lead, polychlorinated biphenyls (PCBs), and other contaminants.

In 2023, the United States Environmental Protection Agency awarded the Turtle Mountain Band of Chippewa Indians a $1 million Brownfields Cleanup Grant for the main hospital building at San Haven. The funding was intended to address contamination from asbestos, lead, and polychlorinated biphenyl (PCB). The tribe planned to clean up and demolish the affected buildings and redevelop the property for housing and an RV park and campground.

Demolition of the main hospital began in 2024 and was nearing completion by October 2025. Cleanup of the property continued after the demolition, and the Turtle Mountain Band of Chippewa Indians planned to redevelop the site as a heritage park, with potential recreational and memorial uses.

== Tuberculosis treatment and patient life ==
When San Haven opened in 1912, patients were charged $1.50 per day or $5 per week for treatment. For patients unable to pay, the cost could be covered by their county of residence.

During the sanatorium era, treatment at San Haven initially centered on bed rest, fresh air, and a well-balanced diet. Patients spent much of their time outdoors receiving fresh-air treatment and heliotherapy, or sun treatment. When patients were indoors, windows were kept open to allow outside air into their rooms, including during the winter months.

Children receiving treatment at San Haven continued their education while at the sanatorium. An open-air school began on January 1, 1916, with eight students. Classes were initially held on an open-air porch of the Administration Building, allowing the children to continue receiving fresh-air treatment while attending school.

Beginning in 1920, San Haven physicians used surgical procedures intended to rest or collapse lungs affected by tuberculosis. Artificial pneumothorax, in which air was introduced into the pleural space to collapse an affected lung, was commonly used. Other procedures included operations involving the phrenic nerve and thoracoplasty, in which ribs were removed to produce a more permanent collapse of the lung.

The introduction of antibiotics changed tuberculosis treatment at San Haven. The sanatorium began using antibiotics to treat tuberculosis on July 1, 1949. By 1958, the number of beds in use at San Haven had declined substantially.

San Haven provided recreational and occupational activities for patients during their stays. Patients had access to a library, movies, and weekly church services. Those who were well enough to be ambulatory could work for a few hours each day in areas such as the greenhouse, barns, grounds, or administrative offices.

Nurses at San Haven were responsible for patients’ daily medical and personal care, including taking vital signs, administering medication, changing bedding, and assisting patients during open-air treatment. During the winter, nurses used blankets and hot-water bottles to keep patients warm while windows remained open for fresh-air treatment. In 1922, San Haven established a one-year nursing training program specializing in tuberculosis care.

== Care for people with developmental disabilities ==
As the number of tuberculosis patients declined, San Haven began admitting residents from the Grafton State School. By the 1970s, San Haven primarily provided institutional care for people with developmental disabilities.

In 1980, the North Dakota Association for Retarded Citizens filed a class-action lawsuit against the State of North Dakota concerning the care and treatment of people with developmental disabilities at San Haven and the Grafton State School. The litigation resulted in court-ordered changes to the state’s system of institutional and community-based care.

The court-ordered reforms increased the use of community-based services for people with developmental disabilities. Residents were given greater opportunities to live in their own communities rather than in state institutions. When San Haven closed in December 1987, its remaining residents were transferred either to community services or to the Grafton State School.

== See also ==
- North Dakota State Hospital
