= Ragnar Benson (contractor) =

Swedish-American building contractor

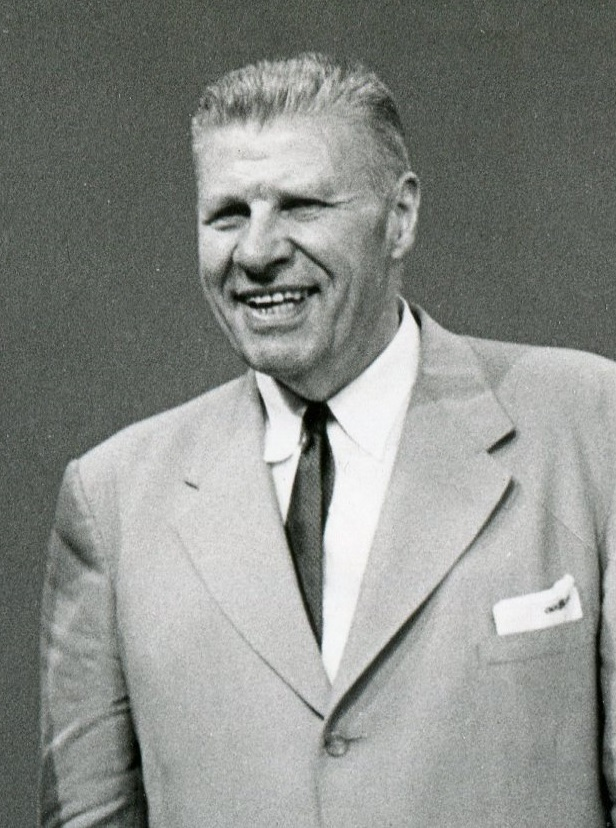
- Benson in 1959
- Born: Eric Ragnar Benson; July 29, 1899; Virestad, Älmhult, Sweden
- Died: March 10, 1979 (aged 79); Chicago, Illinois, U.S.
- Occupation: Building contractor
- Spouse: Elsa K. Olson
- Children: 1
- Parent(s): Karl Edvard Bengtsson; Matilda Bengtsdotter

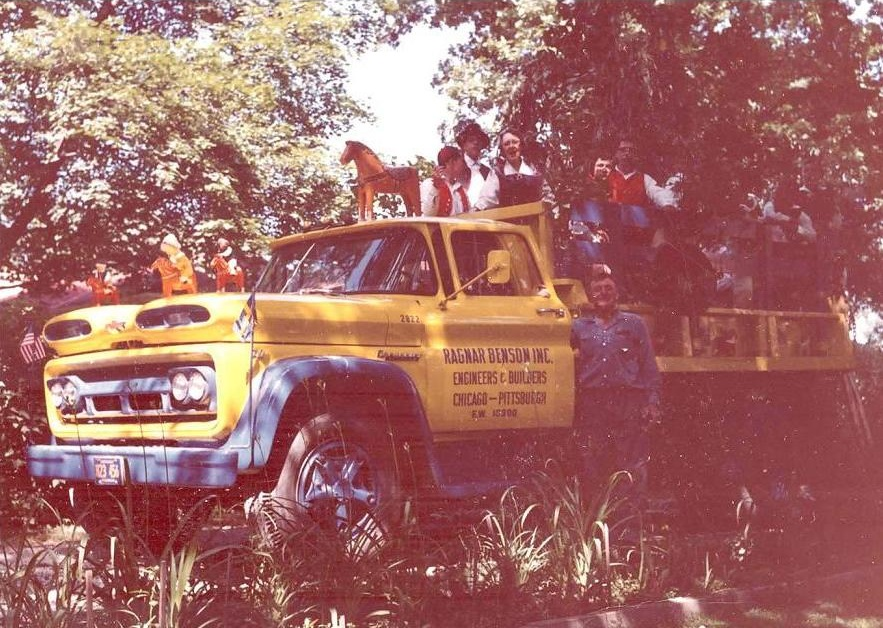
Birgit Ridderstedt and her young dance group use a Ragnar Benson truck for a parade in 1960

Eric Ragnar Benson (born July 29, 1899 in Virestad, Älmhult, Sweden, died March 10, 1979, in Chicago) was a Swedish-American building contractor in Chicago whose firm was one of the ten largest in the United States and employed thousands. Benson was the son of Karl Edvard Bengtsson and Matilda Bengtsdotter, and one of 10 children. He arrived without means in the United States at age 11, became a stonemason and bricklayer, created Ragnar Benson Inc. in 1922 and by 1969 was given the Horatio Alger Award. His firm worked for many major U. S. companies, built Chrysler assembly plant, Belvidere, 1964-65 and the famous towers at Three Mile Island. Ragnar Benson Inc. had built Chicago structures including the CNA Building and Harbor Point Towers and had performed maintenance work on city buildings including Tribune Tower and the Wrigley Building. Benson was widely known for philanthropic generosity which at times was considered eccentric.

The King of Sweden once stopped his car to chat (" 'If it isn't Benson!' the king said to me. He remembered me!"). Swedes in sports inspired Benson to back Ingemar Johansson for a heavyweight championship fight in Chicago in 1959. Johansson got a guarantee from a 12-man syndicate headed by Ragnar Benson. Benson, a big, mild man with twisted, trembling fingers, said he was offering the guarantee "because Chicago has been good to me. I came here without a cent. It doesn't help my business one single cent, not one single cent."

In April 1957, a specially chartered SAS DC 6 landed at Bulltofta airport in Malmö in southern Sweden. On board were 70 passengers who had boarded the plane in Chicago the previous day. They were all Swedish Americans, relatives and friends of Ragnar Benson, embarking on a twelve-day family reunion tour of Ragnar Benson's ancestral area in and around Älmhult in southern Småland. The tour generated a great deal of attention in Sweden, and they were followed by journalists and interested onlookers as they traveled from one reunion to another in Småland. Benson brought a special necklace from Mayor Richard Daley of Chicago to Mayor Thomas Munck af Rosenschöld, the journey went in rented buses to Älmhult. In 1963, Benson was back in Sweden this time with 35 relatives and old-time employees whom he considered “all a part of my family.” The 63-year-old construction contractor gave another purpose of the trip. “I'm bringing along some loving cups which I will give out as prizes to the winners of the south Sweden swimming meet on Aug. 14,” he said. “It seems they named it after me.”

Benson married Elsa K. Olson and had one son, Raymond Lewis Benson, who sold most of the family business after his father's death in 1979. The company still (2026) has the name Ragnar Benson Construction but is a subsidiary of a larger one.

Philanthropy

At Augustana College there is a scholarship established in memory of Ragnar Benson through gifts from his son, Raymond L. Benson, and designated for Lutheran students from the Greater Chicago area.
