= Fannie Almara Quain =

U.S. family physician (1874–1950)

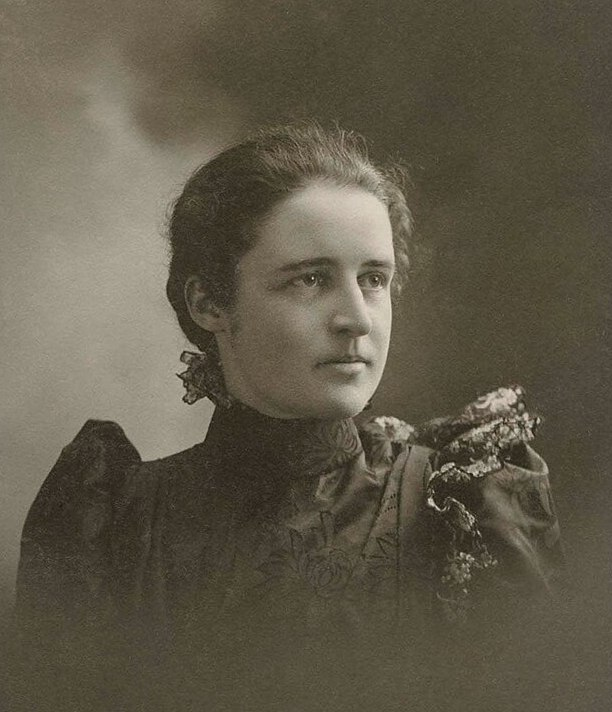
- Graduation photograph of Quain from the University of Michigan Medical School
- Born: Fannie Almara Dunn; February 13, 1874; Bismarck, Dakota Territory, U.S.
- Died: February 2, 1950 (aged 75); Bismarck, North Dakota, U.S.
- Education: St. Cloud Normal School; University of Michigan Medical School
- Known for: First female physician from North Dakota
- Children: 2
- Scientific career
- Fields: Family medicine, tuberculosis

Fannie Almara Dunn Quain (née Dunn; February 13, 1874 – February 2, 1950) was an American family physician and public health advocate who was the first woman born in North Dakota to earn a doctor of medicine degree. She led a state campaign to eradicate tuberculosis and helping to establish baby clinics and the North Dakota State Tuberculosis Sanitarium. Quain also was a founder and president of the North Dakota Tuberculosis Association, and helped improve standards for nurses' training in the state.

== Early life and education ==
Fannie Almara Dunn was born in Bismarck in the Dakota Territory, on February 13, 1874, the daughter of pharmacist John Platt Dunn III and Christina Seelye Dunn, a dressmaker and hat maker. Dunn studied at Bismarck High School and pursued teacher training at St. Cloud Normal School. Many of her family members were physicians, and she expressed an interest in becoming a physician herself.

Because Quain's parents could not pay her medical school expenses, she taught, did bookkeeping, and organized a concert tour for a Swedish musical ensemble to earn her tuition. When she graduated from the University of Michigan Medical School in 1898, she became the first woman from North Dakota to hold a doctor of medicine degree.

== Career ==
After an internship in Minneapolis, Quain returned to North Dakota. For the next several years, she worked across the state, often traveling long distances and enduring severe weather to attend to her patients. In one incident, she operated a railroad handcar for six miles, crossing the Missouri River on the Northern Pacific railroad bridge to meet a train carrying a man critically ill with appendicitis. She escorted the patient to the local hospital, saving his life.

She met Eric Peer Quain, a surgeon, in an operating room at St. Alexis Hospital in Bismarck, and the couple married in 1903. They had two children. Quain continued to practice medicine for several years, but eventually withdrew from active practice.

After getting married, Quain was active in the battle to eradicate tuberculosis, and in 1909 was instrumental in establishing the North Dakota Tuberculosis Association, now the American Lung Association of North Dakota. During her long tenure with the association, Quain served as secretary from 1909 to 1921, treasurer from 1939 to 1948, and vice-president from 1921 to 1928 and 1948 to 1950. She was also president of the association from 1928 to 1936. Over the years, Quain worked to increase public awareness of tuberculosis and to establish institutions to help combat the disease. She helped found the state's first baby clinic, and the North Dakota State Tuberculosis Sanitarium.

Quain also served on the North Dakota State Board of Health from 1923 to 1933, and was board president for a number of years. To help raise the standard of nurses' training in the state, she chaired the Nurses Training School Committee at Bismarck Evangelical Hospital from 1920 to 1940, and was president of the Nurses Training School during the 1930s.

Quain was acutely aware of the challenges faced by women physicians, both in North Dakota and throughout the nation. She served as regional director of the Medical Woman's National Association from 1933 to 1934, for the states of North and South Dakota, Minnesota, and Iowa.

Quain died on February 2, 1950, at the age of 75, in Bismarck, North Dakota.
