= Buell Quain =

American ethnologist

- Born: Buell Halvor Quain; May 31, 1912; Bismarck, North Dakota, US
- Died: August 2, 1939 (aged 27); Brazil
- Education: University of Wisconsin - Madison Columbia University
- Occupation: Ethnologist

Buell Halvor Quain (May 31, 1912 – August 2, 1939) was an American ethnologist who, after graduating from University of Wisconsin–Madison and studying as a graduate student at Columbia University, worked with native peoples in Fiji and Brazil. He published a total of four books, three of them posthumously.

In 1938, Quain travelled to Brazil to work with the Kraho people of the Brazilian rainforest, where he also spent time in the Trumai village.

== Death ==
On August 2, 1939, at the age of 27, Buell Quain committed suicide by hanging himself from a tree in the Brazilian rainforest. The reason for the suicide is somewhat unclear - some reports suggested that he had written about having caught an incurable disease, but other reasons were mooted.

== Other ==
The mystery surrounding his death by suicide was the subject of Brazilian author Bernardo Carvalho's 2002 novel Nove Noites.

== Bibliography ==
- The Iroquois - 1937
- The Flight of the Chiefs - 1942
- The Trumai Indians of Central Brazil - 1955 (with Robert Francis Murphy)
- Fijian Village - 1970
