= OPA =

Opa or OPA may refer to:

== Arts and media ==
=== Fictional characters and entities ===
- Olivia Pope & Associates, a fictional crisis management firm in Scandal
- Outer Planets Alliance, a fictional organization in James S.A. Corey's Leviathan Wakes books and the TV series The Expanse based upon them
- Opa-Opa, a character in the Fantasy Zone video game series

=== Film ===
- Opa!, a film starring Matthew Modine, Kosta Zorbas and Agni Scott

=== Music ===
- Opa (Swedish band), a pop/folk band formed in 2012
- Opa (Uruguayan band), a 1969-1977 US-based jazz fusion group
- "Opa" (song), by Giorgos Alkaios, representing Greece at Eurovision 2010
- "Opa Opa", a 1992 song by Notis Sfakianakis; covered by Antique (1999) and Despina Vandi (2004)
- Opa Opa (album), or Mera Me Ti Mera, by Antique, 1999

== Laws and international agreements ==
- Obscene Publications Act 1959, an Act of Parliament in the United Kingdom
- Oil Pollution Act of 1990, a United States law
- Ouagadougou Peace Agreement, that put an end to the Ivorian Civil War
- Outward Processing Arrangement, a trade agreement between Hong Kong and mainland China

== Organizations ==
=== Government agencies ===
- U.S. Office of Palestinian Affairs, a United States government office in Jerusalem managing Palestinian relations
- Office of the Pardon Attorney, an agency of the United States Department of Justice
- Office of Population Affairs, a United States agency providing advice on population issues
- Office of Price Administration, a United States government office set up to stabilize prices and coordinate rationing after the outbreak of World War II
- Oil and Pipelines Agency, a United Kingdom agency
- Ontario Power Authority, a government agency in Canada

=== Other organizations ===
- FC OPA, an association football club from Oulu, Finland
- Postnominal letters used by the Anglican Order of Preachers (Ordo Praedicatorum Anglicanus)
- Online Privacy Alliance, a coalition of Internet companies
- OPA Co., Ltd. (Oriental Park Avenue), a Japanese clothing retail chain and subsidiary of Daiei
- Ordre des Palmes Academiques, an Order of Chivalry of France for academics and cultural and educational figures
- Oregon Pioneer Association, a fraternal-lineage society first established as the Oregon Pioneer Society in 1867
- Oregon Potters Association, a not-for-profit group of clay artists
- Omega Phi Alpha, a service sorority

== People ==
- Opa Muchinguri, a Zimbabwean politician
- Opa Nguette, a French footballer
- Opa, nickname of Dorus Rijkers, Dutch lifeboat captain who rescued over 500 people in his career

== Science and technology ==
=== Chemistry ===
- OPA mixture, a mixture used in chemical weapons
- Ortho-phthalaldehyde, a dialdehyde used in the synthesis of heterocyclic compounds and a reagent in the analysis of amino acids

=== Physics ===
- Open Public Alert, a public alert of a gravitational wave event
- Optical parametric amplifier, a laser light source that emits light of variable wavelengths
- Optical phased array

=== Computing ===
- Opa (programming language), a web development platform
- Intel Omni-Path architecture, a design for high performance computing
- Open Platform Architecture, a software interface from Ericsson Mobile Platforms for use internally in cellular phones
- Open Policy Agent, an open source policy engine cloud infrastructure from the Cloud Native Computing Foundation
- Oracle Policy Automation, an enterprise applications suite

=== Medicine ===
- Oligo Pool Assay, a SNP genotyping platform from Illumina
- Oropharyngeal airway, a device used to keep the upper respiratory airway open
- Out-patient appointments
- Ovine pulmonary adenocarcinoma, a disease of the lungs in sheep and goats, also known as Jaagsiekte

== Other uses ==
- Ambae Island, Vanuatu (also known as Opa)
- Opa (expression), an interjection used in various cultures
- Opa (roller coaster), a closed roller coaster in Wisconsin
- Toyota Opa, a car
- Opa Station, a North Korean railway station
- OPA grade tea
- Maricopa people, a Native American tribe

== See also ==
- Hopa (disambiguation)
