= Hopa (disambiguation) =

Hopa is a city and a district in the Artvin Province of Turkey.

Hopa may also refer to:

- Hopa River, main water stream of Hopa in the eastern Black Sea Region of Turkey
- Housing for Older Persons Act, known as HOPA, an amendment to the U.S. Fair Housing Act
- Malus hopa, a type of Crabapple tree
- HOPA or hidden object puzzle adventure, a variety of hidden object game
- Opa (Greek expression), sometimes Hopa, a common Greek emotional expression
- Hematology/Oncology Pharmacy Association, a professional pharmacy association; see Joint Commission of Pharmacy Practitioners

== People with the surname ==
- Aaron Hopa (1971–1998), New Zealand rugby union player
- Ngapare Hopa, Maori academic of Waikato Tainui descent
- Thando Hopa (born 1989), South African model, activist, and lawyer

== See also ==
- OPA (disambiguation), including Opa
