= List of Gamma Sigma Sigma chapters =

Gamma Sigma Sigma is a national service sorority founded by the merger of eight local sororities on October 12, 1952, at Beekman Tower in New York City.

== Collegiate chapters ==
In the following list of Gamma Sigma Sigma collegiate chapters, active chapters are indicated in bold and inactive chapters and institutions are in italics.

| Chapters | Charter date and range | Institution | Location | Status | Ref. |
|---|---|---|---|---|---|
| Alpha | October 12, 1952 – 1958; 1966 | University of Houston | Houston, Texas | Inactive | (Note: Chapter formed from Alpha Gamma Chi (local).) |
| Beta | October 12, 1952 | Brooklyn College | New York City, New York | Inactive | (Note: Chapter formed from Booster Squad (local).) |
| Gamma | October 12, 1952 –before 1991 | Los Angeles City College | Los Angeles, California | Inactive | (Note: Chapter formed from Alpha Gamma Chi (local).) |
| Delta | October 12, 1952 | New York University | New York City, New York | Inactive | (Note: Chapter formed from Women's Service Organization (local).) |
| Epsilon | October 12, 1952 | Boston University | Boston, Massachusetts | Inactive | (Note: Chapter formed from Omega Service Sorority (local).) |
| **Zeta** | October 12, 1952 | Drexel University | Philadelphia, Pennsylvania | Active | (Note: Chapter formed from Gamma Sigma Sigma (local).) |
| Eta | | | | Unassigned | (Note: The name Eta chapter was reserved for Sigma Lambda Phi of the University of Miami. However, the local sorority did not attend the Gamma Sigma organizational convention's final day. Sigma Lambda Phi joined as the Upsilon chapter in 1958.) |
| Theta | October 12, 1952 | Queens College, City University of New York | Flushing, Queens, New York | Inactive | (Note: Chapter formed from Phi Gamma (local).) |
| Iota | June 1953 – before 1991 | University of Detroit Mercy | Detroit, Michigan | Inactive | |
| Kappa | 1955–before 1991 | University of California, Berkeley | Berkeley, California | Inactive | |
| Lambda | 1955 | Lehman College | Bronx, New York | Inactive | |
| Mu | 1956 | Upsala College | East Orange, New Jersey | Inactive | (Note: College closed in 1995.) |
| **Nu** | February 26, 1956 – 19xx ?; xxxx? | University of Connecticut | Storrs, Connecticut | Active | (Note: Chapter formed from Alpha Gamma Chi, a local service sorority.) |
| Xi | 1957 | University of Maryland, College Park | College Park, Maryland | Inactive | |
| Omicron | June 21, 1957 – c. 2023 | University of Minnesota | Minneapolis and Saint Paul, Minnesota | Inactive | |
| Pi | 1957 | City College of New York | New York City, New York | Inactive | |
| Rho | 1957 | Hunter College | New York City, New York | Inactive | |
| Sigma | November 3, 1957 – before 1991 | Valparaiso University | Valparaiso, Indiana | Inactive | |
| **Tau** | 1957 | Pennsylvania State University | State College, Pennsylvania | Active | |
| Upsilon | 1958 | University of Miami | Coral Gables, Florida | Inactive | (Note: Chapter formed from Sigma Lambda Phi, a local sorority that had been involved in the founding of Gamma Sigma Sigma.) |
| Phi | 1958 | City College of San Francisco | San Francisco, California | Inactive | |
| Chi | 1958–2021 | University of Georgia | Athens, Georgia | Inactive | (Note: The chapter withdrew and formed Chi Zeta, a local community-based service society open to all genders.) |
| Psi | 1959 | College of Great Falls | Great Falls, Montana | Inactive | (Note: Chapter formed at the College of Great Falls which is now the University of Providence.) |
| Omega | June 1959 | University of Wisconsin–Eau Claire | Eau Claire, Wisconsin | Inactive | |
| Alpha Alpha | 1960 | University of Wisconsin–Oshkosh | Oshkosh, Wisconsin | Inactive | |
| Alpha Beta | 1961 | St. Cloud State University | St. Cloud, Minnesota | Inactive | |
| Alpha Gamma | 1961 | Northwest Missouri State University | Maryville, Missouri | Inactive | |
| Alpha Delta | 1963 | Southern University | Baton Rouge, Louisiana | Inactive | |
| Alpha Epsilon | 1963 | Southern Illinois University Edwardsville | Edwardsville, Illinois | Inactive | |
| Alpha Zeta | 1963 | Youngstown State University | Youngstown, Ohio | Inactive | |
| Alpha Eta | June 15, 1963 | Howard University | Washington, D.C. | Inactive | |
| Alpha Theta | 1963 | University of Massachusetts Amherst | Amherst, Massachusetts | Inactive | |
| Alpha Iota | 1963–2022 | University of Minnesota Duluth | Duluth, Minnesota | Inactive | |
| Alpha Kappa | 1963 | Florida State University | Tallahassee, Florida | Inactive | |
| Alpha Lambda | 1963 | Minnesota State University, Mankato | Mankato, Minnesota | Inactive | |
| Alpha Mu | 1964 | Northern Michigan University | Marquette, Michigan | Inactive | |
| Alpha Nu | 1964 | Central Connecticut State University | New Britain, Connecticut | Inactive | |
| Alpha Xi | 1964 | Morgan State University | Baltimore, Maryland | Inactive | |
| Alpha Omicron | 1965 | Carthage College | Kenosha, Wisconsin | Inactive | |
| **Alpha Pi** | June 18, 1965 | University of Wisconsin–Stout | Menomonie, Wisconsin | Active | |
| Alpha Rho | 1965 | American University | Washington, D.C. | Inactive | |
| Alpha Sigma | 1965 | Northeastern State University | Tahlequah, Oklahoma | Inactive | |
| Alpha Tau | 1965 | Xavier University | Cincinnati, Ohio | Inactive | |
| Alpha Upsilon | 1966 | Marietta College | Marietta, Ohio | Inactive | |
| Alpha Phi | March 19, 1966 | Westfield State College | Westfield, Massachusetts | Inactive | |
| Alpha Chi | 1966 | University of Wisconsin–Madison | Madison, Wisconsin | Inactive | |
| **Alpha Psi** | 1966 | Southeast Missouri State University | Cape Girardeau, Missouri | Active | |
| Alpha Omega | 1966 | California Polytechnic State University, San Luis Obispo | San Luis Obispo, California | Inactive | |
| Beta Alpha | 1967 | Campbell College | Buies Creek, North Carolina | Inactive | |
| Beta Beta | 1967 | Albright College | Reading, Pennsylvania | Inactive | |
| **Beta Gamma** | June 1967 | University of Delaware | Newark, Delaware | Active | |
| **Beta Delta** | June 1967 | University of Wisconsin–La Crosse | La Crosse, Wisconsin | Active | |
| Beta Epsilon | 1967–1991 | Edinboro University of Pennsylvania | Edinboro, Pennsylvania | Inactive | |
| Beta Zeta | 1967–1991, c. 2004 | Tuskegee University | Tuskegee, Alabama | Inactive | |
| Beta Eta | 1967 | Suffolk University | Boston, Massachusetts | Inactive | |
| Beta Theta | 1967–1991 | Texas Wesleyan University | Fort Worth, Texas | Inactive | |
| Beta Iota | June 16, 1967 | Tarleton State University | Stephenville, Texas | Inactive | |
| Beta Kappa | 1968 | University of Wisconsin–Green Bay | Green Bay, Wisconsin | Inactive | |
| Beta Lambda | March 30, 1968 | North Carolina A&T State University | Greensboro, North Carolina | Inactive | |
| Beta Mu | May 1968 | Bucks County Community College | Bucks County, Pennsylvania | Inactive | |
| Beta Nu | 1968 | University of Oklahoma | Norman, Oklahoma | Inactive | |
| Beta Xi | 1968 | State University of New York at Oneonta | Oneonta, New York | Inactive | |
| Beta Omicron | 1968 | Missouri Valley College | Marshall, Missouri | Inactive | |
| Beta Pi | 1968 | Rider University | Lawrence Township, New Jersey | Inactive | |
| Beta Rho | 1968 | Lincoln Memorial University | Harrogate, Tennessee | Inactive | |
| Beta Sigma | November 17, 1968 | Western Kentucky University | Bowling Green, Kentucky | Inactive | |
| Beta Tau | 1969 | St. Peter's College | Jersey City, New Jersey | Inactive | |
| Beta Upsilon | 1968 | University of New Mexico | Albuquerque, New Mexico | Inactive | |
| Beta Phi | 1969 | Lynchburg College | Lynchburg, Virginia | Inactive | |
| **Beta Chi** | 1969 | Lebanon Valley College | Annville Township, Pennsylvania | Active | |
| **Beta Psi** | June 22, 1969 | Indiana University of Pennsylvania | Indiana, Pennsylvania | Active | |
| Beta Omega | 1969 | Kent State University | Kent, Ohio | Inactive | |
| **Gamma Alpha** | 1969–1991, 2021 | Florida A&M University | Tallahassee, Florida | Active | |
| Gamma Beta | 1969 | University of Wisconsin–Milwaukee | Milwaukee, Wisconsin | Inactive | |
| Gamma Gamma | 1969 | Wiley College | Marshall, Texas | Inactive | |
| **Gamma Delta** | 1969 | Duquesne University | Pittsburgh, Pennsylvania | Active | |
| Gamma Epsilon | 1969–October 1974 | Texas Christian University | Fort Worth, Texas | Inactive | |
| Gamma Zeta | 1969 | Michigan State University | East Lansing, Michigan | Inactive | |
| Gamma Eta | 1969–before 1991 | Utica College of Syracuse University | Utica, New York | Inactive | |
| Gamma Theta | 1969–1991 | Stephen F. Austin State University | Nacogdoches, Texas | Inactive | |
| Gamma Iota | 1970 | Savannah State University | Savannah, Georgia | Inactive | |
| **Gamma Kappa** | 1970 | University of Tennessee | Knoxville, Tennessee | Active | |
| Gamma Lambda | 1970 | University of Puerto Rico, Río Piedras Campus | San Juan, Puerto Rico | Inactive | |
| Gamma Mu | 1970 | University of Maryland Eastern Shore | Princess Anne, Maryland | Inactive | |
| **Gamma Nu** | 1970 | Alabama A&M University | Normal, Alabama | Active | |
| Gamma Xi | 1970 | University of Alabama in Huntsville | Huntsville, Alabama | Inactive | |
| Gamma Omicron | 1970 | Ball State University | Muncie, Indiana | Inactive | |
| **Gamma Pi** | 1970 | Carson Newman College | Jefferson City, Tennessee | Active | |
| **Gamma Rho** | 1970–19xx?; xxxx ? | University of Pittsburgh | Pittsburgh, Pennsylvania | Active | |
| Gamma Sigma | 1971 | Alma College | Alma, Michigan | Inactive | |
| Gamma Tau | 1971 | Winston-Salem State University | Winston-Salem, North Carolina | Inactive | |
| Gamma Upsilon | 1971 | North Carolina Central University | Durham, North Carolina | Inactive | |
| Gamma Phi | 1971-19XX; 1999 | Saint Francis University | Loretto, Pennsylvania | Inactive | |
| Gamma Chi | 1971–before 1991 | Southwest Texas State University | San Marcos, Texas | Inactive | |
| Gamma Psi | 1971 | California State University, Chico | Chico, California | Inactive | |
| Gamma Omega | 1971 | Cameron University | Lawton, Oklahoma | Inactive | |
| Delta Alpha | 1971 | Appalachian State University | Boone, North Carolina | Inactive | |
| Delta Beta | 1971 | West Texas State University | Canyon, Texas | Inactive | |
| Delta Gamma | 1972 | University of Arkansas | Fayetteville, Arkansas | Inactive | |
| Delta Delta | 1972 | SUNY Brockport | Brockport, New York | Inactive | |
| Delta Epsilon | January 16, 1972 | East Texas State University | Commerce, Texas | Inactive | |
| Delta Zeta | January 16, 1972 | Auburn University | Auburn, Alabama | Inactive | |
| Delta Eta | February 5, 1972 | University of Texas at El Paso | El Paso, Texas | Inactive | |
| **Delta Theta** | 1972–19xx ?, 2011 | Fort Valley State University | Fort Valley, Georgia | Active | |
| Delta Iota | 1972 | Northern Virginia Community College | Alexandria, Virginia | Inactive | |
| Delta Kappa | 1972 | University of North Carolina at Chapel Hill | Chapel Hill, North Carolina | Inactive | |
| Delta Lambda | 1972 | Ocean County College | Ocean County, New Jersey | Inactive | |
| Delta Mu | 1972 | Central Michigan University | Mount Pleasant, Michigan | Inactive | |
| **Delta Nu** | October 14, 1972 | University of Maine | Orono, Maine | Active | |
| Delta Xi | October 1972 | Missouri State University | Springfield, Missouri | Inactive | |
| Delta Omicron | 1973 | University of Louisville | Louisville, Kentucky | Inactive | |
| Delta Pi | April 1973 | Monmouth College | Monmouth, Illinois | Inactive | |
| Delta Rho | 1973 | Fayetteville State University | Fayetteville, North Carolina | Inactive | |
| Delta Sigma | 1973–before 1991 | Samford University | Homewood, Alabama | Inactive | |
| Delta Tau | June 1973 | East Tennessee State University | Johnson City, Tennessee | Inactive | |
| Delta Upsilon | 1973–before 1991 | State University of New York at Potsdam | Potsdam, New York | Inactive | |
| Delta Phi | February 24, 1974 – 2016 | Dillard University | New Orleans, Louisiana | Inactive | |
| **Delta Chi** | 1974 | East Carolina University | Greenville, North Carolina | Active | |
| Delta Psi | 1974 | University of Texas at Arlington | Arlington, Texas | Inactive | |
| Delta Omega | 1974–before 1991; c. 2003–2023 | La Salle University | Philadelphia, Pennsylvania | Inactive | |
| Epsilon Alpha | 1974 | St. Augustine's College | Raleigh, North Carolina | Inactive | |
| **Epsilon Beta** | April 1974 | Clemson University | Clemson, South Carolina | Active | |
| Epsilon Gamma | October 15, 1974 | McKendree University | Lebanon, Illinois | Inactive | |
| Epsilon Delta | 1975 | Delgado Community College | Orleans Parish and Jefferson Parish, Louisiana | Inactive | |
| Epsilon Epsilon | 1975 | University of Tennessee at Martin | Martin, Tennessee | Inactive | |
| Epsilon Zeta | 1975 | University of North Carolina at Greensboro | Greensboro, North Carolina | Inactive | |
| Epsilon Eta | 1975–xxxx ?; Spring 2007 | Florida Memorial University | Miami Gardens, Florida | Inactive | |
| Epsilon Theta | 1975 | Durham College | Oshawa and Whitby, Ontario, Canada | Inactive | |
| Epsilon Iota | 1975 | Bishop College | Marshall, Texas | Inactive | (Note: College closed in 1988.) |
| Epsilon Kappa | 1975 | Kentucky State University | Frankfort, Kentucky | Inactive | |
| **Epsilon Lambda** | 1975–xxxx ?; Spring 2010 | Alabama State University | Montgomery, Alabama | Active | |
| Epsilon Mu | 1975 | Chattanooga State Community College | Chattanooga, Tennessee | Inactive | |
| **Epsilon Nu** | 1976 | Bethune Cookman College | Daytona Beach, Florida | Active | |
| **Epsilon Xi** | 1976 | Moravian College | Bethlehem, Pennsylvania | Active | |
| Epsilon Omicron | 1976 | Albany State University | Albany, Georgia | Inactive | |
| Epsilon Pi | 1977 | Central Missouri State University | Warrensburg, Missouri | Inactive | |
| Epsilon Rho | 1977 | University of Dubuque | Dubuque, Iowa | Inactive | |
| Epsilon Sigma | 197x ? | Virginia State University | Ettrick, Virginia | Inactive | |
| Epsilon Tau | 197x ? | Rust College | Holly Springs, Mississippi | Inactive | |
| Epsilon Upsilon | 197x ?–1991 | University of Florida | Gainesville, Florida | Inactive | |
| Epsilon Phi | April 27, 1979 | Fitchburg State College | Fitchburg, Massachusetts | Inactive | |
| Epsilon Chi | 19xx ? | Southern University of New Orleans | New Orleans, Louisiana | Inactive | |
| Epsilon Psi | 19xx ?–1991; April 2, 2005 | Tennessee State University | Nashville, Tennessee | Inactive | |
| Epsilon Omega | 19xx ? | University of Arkansas | Fayetteville, Arkansas | Inactive | |
| Zeta Alpha | 19xx ? | Lincoln University | Lower Oxford Township, Pennsylvania | Inactive | |
| Zeta Beta | 19xx ? | University of St. Thomas | Saint Paul and Minneapolis, Minnesota | Inactive | |
| Zeta Gamma | 19xx ? | Loyola University New Orleans | New Orleans, Louisiana | Inactive | |
| Zeta Delta | 19xx ? | Georgia Tech | Atlanta, Georgia | Inactive | |
| Zeta Epsilon | 19xx ? | Austin Peay State University | Clarksville, Tennessee | Inactive | |
| Zeta Zeta | 19xx ? | University of Alabama | Tuscaloosa, Alabama | Inactive | |
| Zeta Eta | 19xx ? | Shippensburg University of Pennsylvania | Shippensburg, Pennsylvania | Inactive | |
| Zeta Theta | 19xx–xxxx ?, 2011 | Jacksonville State University | Jacksonville, Alabama | Inactive | |
| **Zeta Iota** | 1991 | Prairie View A&M University | Prairie View, Texas | Active | |
| Zeta Kappa | 199x? | Western Carolina University | Cullowhee, North Carolina | Inactive | |
| Zeta Lambda | 199x? | Temple University | Philadelphia, Pennsylvania | Inactive | |
| Zeta Mu | 199x? | Husson University | Bangor, Maine | Inactive | |
| **Zeta Nu** | 199x? | Slippery Rock University | Slippery Rock, Pennsylvania | Active | |
| **Zeta Xi** | 199x? | North Georgia College and State University | Dahlonega, Georgia | Active | |
| **Zeta Omicron** | 199x? | Georgia College & State University | Milledgeville, Georgia | Active | |
| Zeta Pi | 199x? | Texas Southern University | Houston, Texas | Inactive | |
| Zeta Rho | xxxx ? | Marquette University | Milwaukee, Wisconsin | Inactive | |
| Zeta Sigma | xxxx ? | McDaniel College | Westminster, Maryland | Inactive | |
| Zeta Tau | May 8, 2000 | Georgia State University | Atlanta, Georgia | Inactive | |
| Zeta Upsilon | 200x ? | Ohio State University | Columbus, Ohio | Inactive | |
| Zeta Phi | 2003 | Union College | Schenectady, New York | Inactive | |
| Zeta Chi | c. 2004–20xx?; January 22, 2021 | Grambling State University | Grambling, Louisiana | Inactive | |
| **Zeta Psi** | c. 2004 | Mississippi Valley State University | Mississippi Valley State, Mississippi | Active | |
| Zeta Omega | c. 2004 | Clark Atlanta University | Atlanta, Georgia | Inactive | |
| **Eta Alpha** | March 5, 2005 | Georgia Southern University | Statesboro, Georgia | Active | |
| Eta Beta | 200x ? | Francis Marion University | Florence, South Carolina | Inactive | |
| Eta Gamma | Spring 2007 | Murray State University | Murray, Kentucky | Inactive | |
| **Eta Delta** | Spring 2007 | James Madison University | Harrisonburg, Virginia | Active | |
| Eta Epsilon | Summer 2007 | University of West Georgia | Carrollton, Georgia | Inactive | |
| Eta Zeta | January 16, 2008 | Spelman College | Atlanta, Georgia | Inactive | |
| Eta Eta | 2008 | University of North Texas | Denton, Texas | Inactive | |
| **Eta Theta** | November 9, 2008 | University of Central Florida | Orlando, Florida | Active | |
| **Eta Iota** | 20xx ? | University of Texas at Dallas | Richardson, Texas | Active | |
| Eta Kappa | 20xx ? | Middle Tennessee State University | Murfreesboro, Tennessee | Inactive | |
| Eta Lambda | 20xx ? | Madonna University | Livonia, Michigan | Inactive | |
| Eta Mu | 2011 | Georgia Regents University | Augusta, Georgia | Inactive | |
| Eta Nu | 2011 | Southern Illinois University Carbondale | Carbondale, Illinois | Inactive | |
| Eta Xi | c. 2011 | Penn State Erie, The Behrend College | Erie, Pennsylvania | Inactive | |
| **Eta Omicron** | c. 2011 | Elizabeth City State University | Elizabeth City, North Carolina | Active | |
| **Eta Pi** | August 21, 2011 | Gannon University | Erie, Pennsylvania | Active | |
| **Eta Rho** | September 2011 | Old Dominion University | Norfolk, Virginia | Active | |
| Eta Sigma | March 28, 2013 | William Peace University | Raleigh, North Carolina | Inactive | |
| **Eta Tau** | March 28, 2013 | Pace University | Pleasantville, New York | Active | |
| Eta Upsilon | April 4, 2014 | University of North Florida | Jacksonville, Florida | Inactive | |
| Eta Phi | July 9, 2015 | Texas A&M University | College Station, Texas | Inactive | |
| Eta Chi | December 9, 2015 | Roanoke College | Salem, Virginia | Inactive | |
| **Eta Omega** | 20xx ? | Pennsylvania Western University, California | California, Pennsylvania | Active | |
| Theta Alpha | 20xx ? | Robert Morris University | Moon Township, Pennsylvania | Inactive | |
| **Theta Beta** | 20xx ? | Valdosta State University | Valdosta, Georgia | Active | |
| **Theta Gamma** | June 22, 2020 | Alcorn State University | Lorman, Mississippi | Active | |
| **Theta Delta** | May 3, 2021 | Talladega College | Talladega, Alabama | Active | |
| **Theta Epsilon** | 202x ? | University of North Carolina at Pembroke | Pembroke, North Carolina | Active | |

== Alumni chapters ==
Following is a list of Gamma Sigma Sigma alumni chapters.

- Atlanta Metropolitan Alumni Chapter
- Bluegrass Alumni Chapter
- Cali White Rose Alumni Chapter
- Cherry Blossom Alumni Chapter
- Delaware Diamonds Alumni Chapter
- First Coast Alumni Chapter
- Gemini Alumni Chapter
- Greater Atlanta Alumni Chapter
- Greater Baltimore Alumni Chapter
- Greater Garnets Alumni Chapter
- Greater Jacksonville Alumni Chapter
- Greater New England Alumni Chapter
- Houston Bayou Alumni Chapter
- Lone Star Alumni Chapter
- Louisiana Alumni Chapter
- Memphis Pearls Alumni Chapter
- Mid-Jersey Shore Alumni Chapter
- Nutmeg Alumni Chapter
- Omicron Alumni Chapter
- Orange Blossom Alumni Chapter
- Philadelphia Alumni Chapter
- Queen City Alumni Chapter
- River Region Garnets and Pearls Alumni Chapter
- Sanguine and Pearls Virtual Alumni Chapter
- South Florida Alumni Chapter
- Southern Pearls Alumni Chapter
- Sovereign Roses Virtual Alumni Chapter
- Steel Magnolia Alumni Chapter
- Sunshine State Alumni Chapter
- Tarheel State Alumni - Chartered July 23, 2010, inactive
- Tri-State Alumni - Chartered April 2013, inactive
- Twin Cities Alumni Chapter
