= Omega Phi Alpha (disambiguation) =

Omega Phi Alpha is an American service sorority.

Omega Phi Alpha may also refer to:

- Omega Phi Alpha, a defunct local fraternity at the University of the Pacific (United States)
- Omega Phi Alpha, a local fraternity at Polytechnic University (New York)
