= Oopa =

Oopa may refer to:

- Out-of-place artifact (OOPA)

== People ==
- Céline Oopa, French Polynesia politician
- Marcel Oopa (1917–1961), Tahitian politician
- Pouvanaa a Oopa (1895–1977), Tahitian politician

=== Characters ===
- Oopa (character), a fictional character from the TV show To Your Eternity (season 1)

== Other uses ==
- "OOPA" (episode), 1999 season 2 number 10 episode 23 of the TV show So Weird; see List of So Weird episodes
- "OOPA" (song), 2009 tune by The Orb off the album Baghdad Batteries (Orbsessions Volume III)

== See also ==
- Oppa
- OPA (disambiguation)
