= Alpha Phi Omega =

National service fraternity (founded in the US, 1925)

- ΑΦΩ
- Founded: December 16, 1925; 100 years ago Lafayette College
- Type: Service
- Affiliation: PFA
- Status: Active
- Scope: North America
- Motto: "Be a Leader, Be a Friend, Be of Service"
- Pillars: Leadership, Friendship, Service
- Colors: Royal blue and Old glory gold
- Symbol: Golden eagle
- Flower: Forget-me-not
- Tree: Sturdy Oak
- Jewel: Diamond
- Publication: Torch & Trefoil
- Chapters: 786
- Colonies: 13
- Members: 500,000+ active
- Headquarters: 1441 East 104th Street; Kansas City, Missouri 64131; United States
- Website: www.apo.org

Alpha Phi Omega (ΑΦΩ), commonly known as APO, but also A-Phi-O and A-Phi-Q, is a national co-educational service fraternity. It is the largest collegiate fraternity in the United States, with chapters at over 786 campuses, an active membership of over 25,000 students, and over 500,000 alumni members. There are also 392 chapters in the Philippines, one in Australia, and one in Canada. The 500,000th member was initiated in the Rho Pi chapter of Alpha Phi Omega at the University of California, San Diego.

Alpha Phi Omega is organized to provide community service, leadership development, and social opportunities for college students. The purpose of the fraternity is "to assemble college students in a National Service Fraternity in the fellowship of principles derived from the Scout Oath and Scout Law of the Boy Scouts of America; to develop Leadership, to promote Friendship, and to provide Service to humanity; and to further the freedom that is our national, educational, and intellectual heritage." Alpha Phi Omega's primary focus is to provide volunteer service within four areas: service to the community, service to the campus, service to the fraternity, and service to the nation and world.

Being primarily a service organization, Alpha Phi Omega does not operate nor maintain a fraternity house as lodging quarters for members or any other persons. However, a chapter may maintain rooms for meetings at the discretion of its members. Alpha Phi Omega does not restrict its members from being members of any other organization.

== History ==
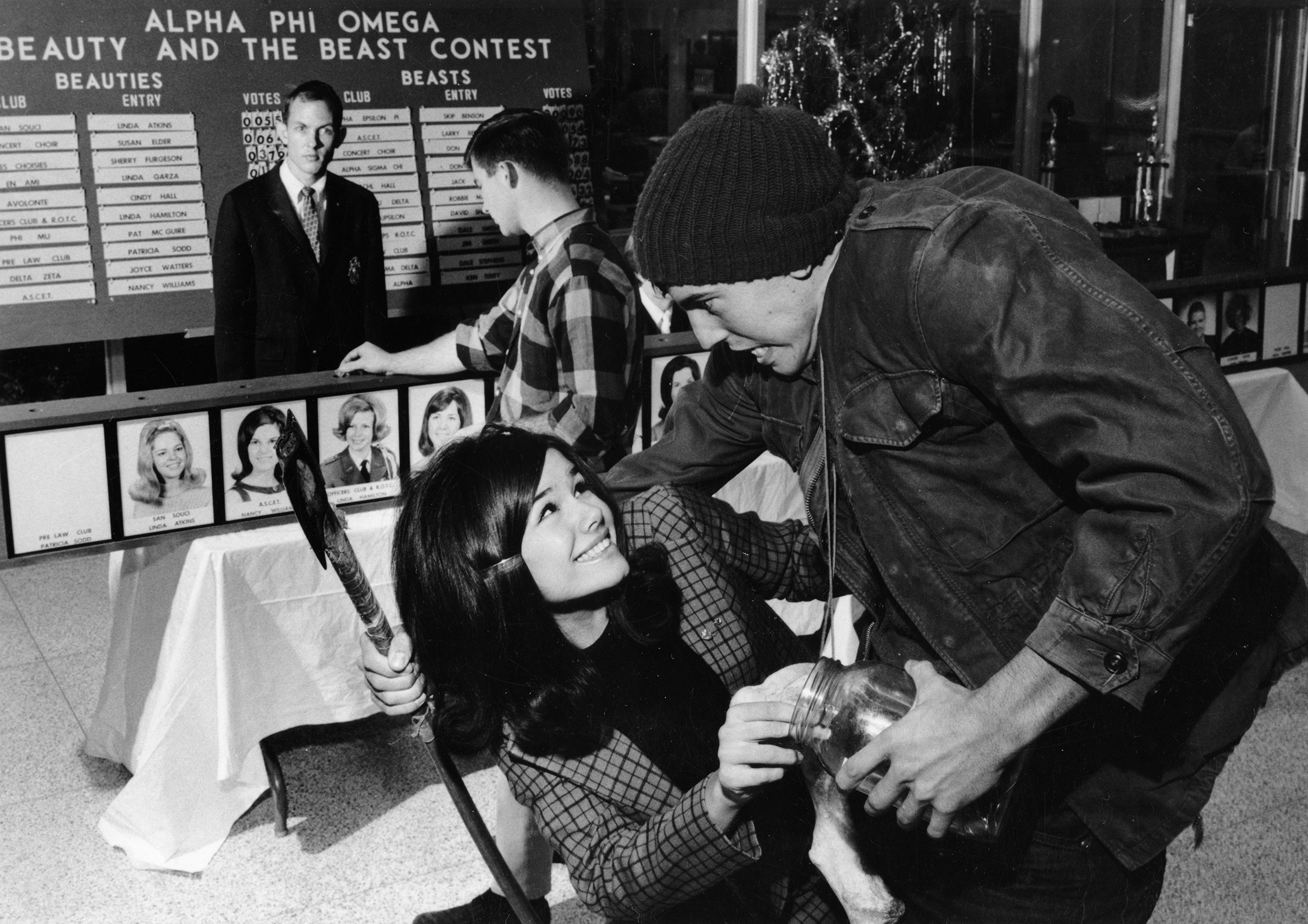
Alpha Phi Omega's "Beauty and the Beast" contest at the University of Texas at Arlington in Arlington, Texas, c. 1960s

Alpha Phi Omega was founded on the 2nd floor of Brainerd Hall, now Hogg Hall, at Lafayette College in Easton, Pennsylvania on December 16, 1925, by Frank Reed Horton and thirteen other students who were former Boy Scouts or scouters. The fraternity's initial objective was to continue participating in the ideals of scouting at the college level.

In addition to Horton, other founding brothers were Everett William Probst, Ephraim Moyer Detwiler Jr., Thane Sanford Cooley, William Taylor Wood, Lewis Burnett Blair, Gordon Minnier Looney, Donald LeRoy Terwilliger, William Weber Highberger, Robert Jefferson Green, Donald H. Fritts, Ellsworth Stewart Dobson, George Axel Olsen, and Herbert Heinrich. Six advisors were also inducted: Lafayette President John H. MacCracken, Dean Donald B. Prentice, Professors D. Arthur Hatch, and Harry T. Spengler; one local scouting official, Herbert G. Horton, and one national Scouting official, the national director of relationships for the Boy Scouts of America, Ray O. Wyland. The founders insisted that all those gaining memberships must pledge to uphold the fraternity's three cardinal principles of leadership, friendship, and service. Of these founding members, several made significant contributions to Alpha Phi Omega that are still recognized today. Everett Probst designed the pin and coat of arms, Thane S. Cooley suggested the hand clasp during the toast song, and Elsworth Dobson and Gordon M. Looney helped write the constitution and bylaws.

Alpha Phi Omega became a national fraternity on January 11, 1927, with the founding of the Beta chapter at University of Pittsburgh. Horton served as supreme grand master from the founding of the fraternity until the 1931 convention. Eighteen chapters were founded during this period. At the 1931 convention, H. Roe Bartle was elected as supreme grand master (title changed to national president in 1934) and served through World War II, stepping down at the 1946 convention. During his time as president, the number of chapters grew to 109. Early in his term (October 1931), Alpha Phi Omega was formally recognized by the Boy Scouts of America.

=== Beginnings of an international fraternity ===
The most rapid growth of the fraternity was in the post-war years. By 1950, Alpha Phi Omega had 227 chapters in the United States. The first chapter outside the US was organized in the Philippines that year. Many Filipinos were active in the Boy Scouts. Sol G. Levy, an APO member from University of Washington and Professional Scouter, introduced the organization to Filipino Scouts. Librado I. Ureta, a graduate student at Far Eastern University in Manila, was among the audience. Inspired by Levy's words, he read the publications and shared them with fellow Eagle Scouts and students on the FEU campus. He asked their opinion about Levy's desire, and the response was good. On March 2, 1950, the Alpha Phi Omega International Service Fraternity was chartered on campus.

Alpha Phi Omega grew rapidly in the Philippines. By its third year, seven chapters had been chartered at Manila and Visayan schools, and it was registered with the Securities and Exchange Commission as a nonstock, nonprofit, and non-dividend corporation. Alpha Phi Omega (Phil.) Inc. was the first branch of the fraternity to be chartered outside the United States.

=== Membership opens to women ===
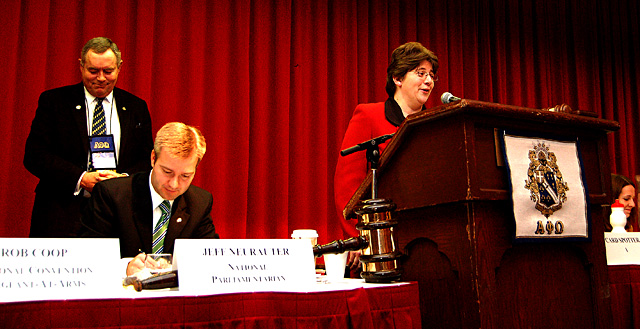
Alpha Phi Omega's first female national president, Maggie Katz, addressing the delegates of the 39th biennial national convention in Louisville, Kentucky, following her election

The fraternity was opened fully to women in 1976. All members are called "Brothers," regardless of gender. The Fraternity views "Brothers" as a gender-neutral term. Before women were allowed to join, several smaller sororities, parallel in ideals but independent in structure, were formed for women who had been Camp Fire Girls or Girl Scouts, including Gamma Sigma Sigma and Omega Phi Alpha. Several Alpha Phi Omega chapters started "little sister" groups, some of which formed separate organizations (e.g., Jewels of Tau, Phyettes, etc.).

The first step in paving the way for women to join Alpha Phi Omega was the Constitutional Convention in 1967, which removed the requirement that members have affiliation with the Boy Scouts of America.

Starting at the 1970 national convention, co-ed membership was sponsored by the Zeta chapter and co-sponsored by several other chapters, but failed to reach the two-thirds majority at the national conventions, which was required to alter the organization's bylaws. Zeta went coed that year and, with the help of a past president and board member, B. Hesselmyer became the first official woman member of the national fraternity. Some chapters (like Delta Rho at Rutgers University and Alpha Tau at Butler University) went co-ed before 1976, although the national by-laws did not allow it. They did so by registering women by using only the first letter of their first name. Many chapters that attempted to register women with the national office would receive the paperwork and fees back for women initiates. The Alpha Chi chapter at the Massachusetts Institute of Technology ran its own printing press and generated certificates and membership cards for its female initiates before 1976.

At the 1974 national convention, the fraternity allowed chapters to have women as affiliate members of the fraternity, and during the 1976 national convention in Atlanta, Georgia, the decision was made to formally welcome females as full members of the fraternity. As with many major changes, this one caused a great deal of dismay, especially among several long-established chapters. Many of these chapters threatened to disassociate with the national fraternity if they were forced to become co-ed. To preserve the unity of the fraternity as a whole, the amendment was crafted such that it did not require existing chapters to admit women as members, although all new chapters were to be coed. It was felt that over time, all would go coed. This "gentleman's agreement" was formalized in a resolution at the 1998 national convention and includes the following points: "The fraternity continues to encourage all chapters and petitioning groups to open their membership to all students. All chapters and petitioning groups have the right to choose their members using objective and open policies that are consistent with the fraternity's governing documents, the rules of the host institutions that they serve, and the traditions of that chapter, if any. Single-gender chapters chartered before the 1976 national convention may remain single-gender unless they become inactive or coeducational. All petitioning groups seeking to charter or re-charter will be and remain co-educational. Allowing women members in 1976 reversed the continuing steep decline in membership of the Fraternity and started a growth cycle in the fraternity.

=== Requirement of open membership ===
At the July 2005 national Board of Directors meeting, a resolution was passed: "The actions of the 1976 and 1998 national conventions have attempted to clarify the Fraternity's open membership policy...The National Board is charged with...enforcing the membership policies of the Fraternity as well as ensuring compliance with applicable laws, and upon advice of legal counsel, all chapters must practice open membership without regard of gender". A decision by the 2006 national convention on December 30, 2006, has essentially upheld the Board's previous resolution, adding additional clarifications to the transitional process for the all-male chapters, including a timeline for completion of their transition to co-educational status by the 2008 national convention, and the establishment of a committee consisting of active members and alumni to assist with the process. In the spring of 2008, the Sigma Xi chapter at the University of Maine formally disassociated from the national fraternity, forming a new fraternity: Alpha Delta. They cited that their action was due to an "ideological split", claiming that the national fraternity allowed female members to join and took away the student focus. In addition, Brothers from the Zeta Theta chapter at Drexel University, the Pi Chi chapter at Duquesne University, and the Psi Delta chapter at the University of Maine at Machias have joined this new fraternity.

On December 30, 2006, the 2006 national convention in Louisville, Kentucky, elected the first female National President of the organization, Maggie Katz. Brother Katz was re-elected, without contest, on December 30, 2008, in Boston, Massachusetts.

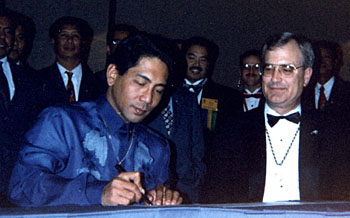
Signing of the ICAPO charter at the 1994 national convention in Dallas/Fort Worth, Texas

=== International Council ===
The International Council of Alpha Phi Omega (ICAPO) was created at the 1994 Dallas-Fort Worth Alpha Phi Omega (USA) national convention with the signing of the charter document. Meetings followed at the 1995 Alpha Phi Omega (Philippines) and the 1996 Phoenix Alpha Phi Omega – USA national convention. At the 1996 convention, a formal set of operating policies for the council was signed, and the first officers were elected. ICAPO meetings now occur in conjunction with Alpha Phi Omega national conventions in the US and the Philippines.

== Symbols and traditions ==
Alpha Phi Omega's motto is "Be a Leader, Be a Friend, Be of Service". Its Cardinal principles or pillars are Leadership, Friendship, and Service. The fraternity's colors are royal blue and old gold. Its symbol is the golden eagle. Its flower is the forget-me-not, and its tree is the sturdy oak. The fraternity's jewel is the diamond.

=== Publications ===
The fraternity's official publication is the Torch & Trefoil. First published as the Lightbearer in February 1927, the name was changed to the Torch & Trefoil by the decision of the Fifth Alpha Phi Omega national convention in December 1934. The new name was from the Torch as the emblem of Education and the Trefoil as the emblem of Scouting. A version is published quarterly by the national organization of the United States, as well as a separate version by the national organization of the Republic of the Philippines.

The Lightbearer has been published since 1966 as a separate daily publication during Alpha Phi Omega national conventions and distributed to convention attendees. The monthly mailing from the fraternity to its chapters was the national convention Bulletin from 2004 to 2008.

== Programs ==
The programs of the fraternity are centered around developing its three cardinal principles: Leadership, Friendship, and Service. Many chapters plan several local service projects throughout the year, including blood drives, tutoring, charity fundraising events, Scouting events, used book exchanges, Boy Scout Merit Badge days, campus escort initiatives, and housing construction/rehabilitation. Signature projects include the annual National Service Week in the first full week of November and the Global Spring Youth Service Day in April. Many of the operations of individual chapters are left to their discretion, though most chapters have membership requirements which require a certain number of hours of service each semester. In the United States, on April 14, 2003, the fraternity received the Daily Point of Light Award #2397 in recognition of its members, who give unselfishly of their time and energy daily and who cumulatively donate an average of over 300,000 hours of community service each semester.

=== APO Leads ===
APO Leads (stylized as APO LEADS) is a leadership development program organized by the national organization of Alpha Phi Omega in the United States. The APO Leads program consists of five individual modular components of leadership development. Each of these modular components focuses on skills that will help the participant be a successful leader and team member in Alpha Phi Omega and life. The five components of APO Leads are Launch, Explore, Achieve, Discover, and Serve. Launch is a prerequisite for participation in any of the other four courses. After the series of courses, the participant will have a set of transferable skills that apply to Alpha Phi Omega, to the working world, as well as to leadership in other organizations. APO Leads has its roots in an earlier program, the Leadership Development Workshop (LDW). The LDW was an all-day, eight-hour leadership development course that was offered to members during the 1980s and 1990s. It was reorganized into the current APO Leads program, which was rolled out in 2002.

=== National Service Week ===
In the United States, Alpha Phi Omega organizes National Service Week (NSW), a project collaboration encompassing all chapters across the nation. The original concept of a "national service project" dates back to the 1948 national convention, in which delegates approved the rebuilding of the Scout Hut at Hallows Church in London after World War II. There were several other national service efforts outside of NSW, including a recent international book drive in 2001, in which chapters collected approximately 100,000 books for schools in the Philippines.

NSW began in 1987 as National Service Day and later expanded to National Service Week in 1997 to allow for greater flexibility and increased participation while retaining the sense of unity of the original concept. NSW is always held during the first full week of November.

A theme for NSW is selected by the delegates of each national convention. The first service week, in 1987, was themed around "Diabetes & Other Chronic Illnesses". The 2014 national convention determined that the National Service Week program of emphasis for 2015–2016 shall be "Literacy and Learning for all", with a specific focus on "Improving Literacy for Adults" in 2015 and "Improving Literacy in Youth" in 2016.

=== Spring Youth Service Day ===
Spring Youth Service Day is Alpha Phi Omega's effort to participate in the Global Youth Service Day project with its partner organization, Youth Service America. During one weekend in April, millions of youth participated in this project, which bills itself as the largest service event in the world. Projects include tutoring young children, disaster relief, voter registration, nutritional awareness, distributing HIV/AIDS prevention materials, and more. Global Youth Service Day supports youth on a lifelong path of service and civic engagement and educates the public, the media, and elected officials about the role of youth as community leaders.

== Chapters ==
Alpha Phi Omega of the United States has 786 chartered chapters. It currently has 443 active chapters, fourteen petitioning groups, nineteen interest groups, and 343 inactive chapters. (Petitioning and interest groups include both those at schools that have previously had active chapters and those that have not.) In addition, Alpha Phi Omega has sixteen charters at schools that have closed or merged with another school with an older charter.

Alpha Phi Omega of the Philippines has charters (either fraternity, sorority or both) at 392 colleges and universities.

== Organization ==
=== International ===
The International Council of Alpha Phi Omega (ICAPO) is the coordinating council of the Alpha Phi Omega National Organizations. During the 1980s, contact between Alpha Phi Omega (USA) and Alpha Phi Omega (Philippines) increased. National presidents Earle Herbert (USA) and Carlos "Caloy" Caliwara (Philippines), as well as other leaders in the two organizations, concluded there was a need for an international coordinating body to promote the ideals of the fraternity around the world.

As stated in the charter of ICAPO: "The purpose of the ICAPO is to promote the principles and ideals of Alpha Phi Omega, as originally exemplified by Frank Reed Horton, around the world. To this end, the Council aids in introducing and establishing collegiate-based Alpha Phi Omega organizations in countries where it is not yet located and assists in institutionalizing Alpha Phi Omega organizations in countries where it is currently introduced or established. It serves as an official link among the variously established independent national Alpha Phi Omega organizations and works to promote a deeper understanding and an increased working relationship among the independent national organizations."

While the ICAPO binds both Alpha Phi Omega (USA) and Alpha Phi Omega (Philippines) into one larger international organization, the respective national organizations operate as individual organizations with a high degree of autonomy. Alpha Phi Omega (USA) has committed to the establishment of Alpha Phi Omega in Canada, and Alpha Phi Omega (Philippines) has committed to the establishment of Alpha Phi Omega in Australia.

=== United States ===
In the United States, Alpha Phi Omega is organized into five levels.

- There are over 350 chapters and a number of Alumni Associations. Each chapter has student brothers who perform service and elect their officers, as well as faculty, scouting, and service advisors drawn from the college and local communities. Each chapter usually has a sectional representative appointed by the local sectional chair.
- There are around sixty sections consisting of geographically close chapters. Each is headed by a sectional chair, who is elected to a one-year term at each section's annual conference. Many sectional chairs have a group of volunteer sectional staff, usually consisting of alumni of various chapters.
- There are eighteen regions consisting of geographically close sections and chapters. Each is headed by an elected regional chair who is a member of the national operations council and heads a group of volunteer regional staff, usually consisting of alumni of various chapters. Each chair is elected by the chapters in that region.
- There is the national board of directors, comprising the elected national officers and others. These officers are elected at the biennial national convention to two-year terms by student and alumni delegates. The board includes the national president, national vice-president, national treasurer, six members-at-large, and four appointed members. Appointed officials include an additional at-large director, legal counsel, the immediate past national president, any past national president, and the National Executive Director.
- There is the national operations council, comprising the elected regional chairs and the appointed program chairs, which include: Alumni Development, DEIAB+, Extension, International Relations Chair, Leadership Development, Membership, Risk Management, Service, and Volunteer Recruitment.
- The supreme authority is the national convention, which meets every two years. It consists of one or two voting delegates from each chapter, one alumni voting delegate from each region, and all the members of the national board of directors and operations council. These voting delegates consider changes to the fraternity's policies, bylaws, and articles of incorporation for the national board of directors to handle between conventions. All members of the fraternity are invited to attend to participate in leadership development seminars, service projects, and fellowship events.

==== National office ====
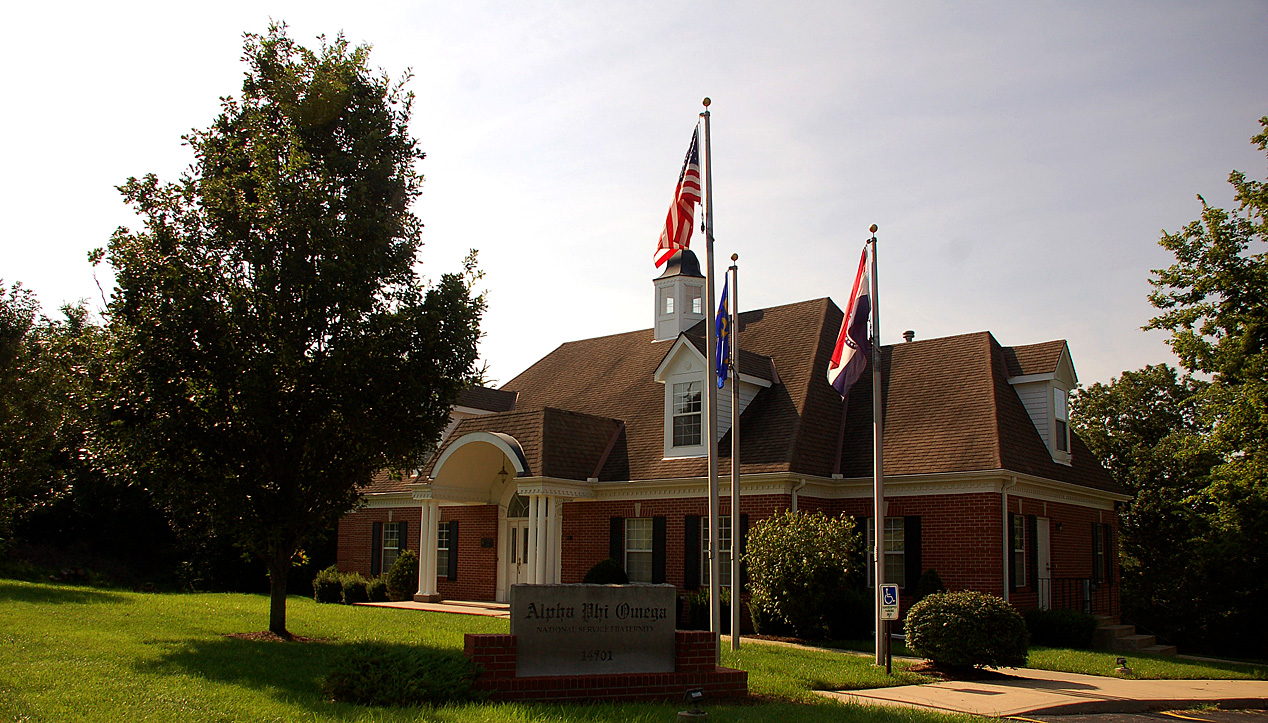
From 1990 to 2016, the APO-USA National Office was located in Independence, Missouri. The national office has since moved back to Kansas City, Missouri

In the United States, the fraternity is headquartered out of a national office located at 14901 East 42nd Street, Independence, Missouri 64055–7347. The building was dedicated on November 17, 1990, following a four-year fundraising campaign during the 1980s. Fundraising for the building continued during the early 1990s, through matching gifts and a national fundraising event entitled, "Burn the Mortgage", raising over $28,000. Thanks to these donations, the fraternity paid the ten-year mortgage in only four years, and national president Jerry Schroeder ceremonially burned the mortgage at the 1994 national convention in Dallas – Fort Worth, Texas.

The move to the Kansas City area was decided by the 1931 national convention. Past locations of the national office in the United States include:

| Years | Location | References |
|---|---|---|
| 1927–1928 | Carnegie Library of Homestead, Munhall, Pennsylvania | |
| 1929 | 606 W. Cork St, Winchester, Virginia | |
| 1930–1931 | Box 360, Winchester, Virginia (Frank Reed Horton's mailbox) | |
| 1931–1933 | Ivanhoe Club Building, 3215 Park Avenue, Kansas City, Missouri | |
| 1934 | 410-11 Land Bank Building, Kansas City 6, Missouri | |
| 1935–1936 | 505 Land Bank Building, Kansas City 6, Missouri | |
| 1936–1938 | 410 Land Bank Building, Kansas City 6, Missouri | |
| 1938–1949 | 407 Land Bank Building, Kansas City 6, Missouri | |
| 1949–1961 | 419 Columbia Bank Building, Kansas City 6, Missouri (Building imploded) | |
| 1961–1986 | 1100 Waltower Building, 823 Walnut Street, Kansas City, Missouri 64106 | |
| 1986–1990 | 400 Mainmark Building, 1627 Main Street, Kansas City, Missouri 64108 | |
| 1990 – 2016 | 14901 E. 42nd St., Independence, Missouri 64055-7347 | |
| 2016 – current | 1441 E. 104th Street, Kansas City, MO 64131 | |

==== Presidents ====
Presidents of Alpha Phi Omega include:

- Frank Reed Horton, 1925–1931
- H. Roe Bartle, 1931–1946
- Arno Nowotny, 1946–1950
- Daniel Den Uyl, 1950–1954
- M. R. Disborough, 1954–1958
- William S. Roth, 1958–1962
- Lester R. Steig, 1962–1964
- Tom T. Galt 1964–1966
- E. Ross Forman, 1966–1968
- Glen T. Nygreen, 1968–1970
- Aubrey B. Hamilton, 1970–1972
- Lucius E. Young, 1972–1974
- Lawrence L. Hirsch, 1974–1978
- Lorin A. Jurvis, 1978–1980
- C. P. Zlatkovich, 1980–1982
- Earle M. Herbert, 1982–1986
- Stan Carpenter, 1986–1990
- Gerald A. Schroeder, 1990–1994
- Wilfred M. Krenek, 1994–1998
- Jack A. McKenzie, 1998–2002
- Bobby Hainline, 2002–2004
- Fred C. Heismeyer, III, 2004–2006
- Maggie Katz, 2006–2010
- Mark Allen Stratton, 2010-2014
- John K. Ottenad, 2014–2018
- Robert Coop, 2018–2021
- Melody Martin, 2021–2025
- Disraeli W. Smith, II, 2025–Present

=== Philippines ===
The national organization of Alpha Phi Omega in the Philippines maintains a four-layer administrative structure: collegiate chapters, regional development directorates, national executive board, and general assembly.

The national office for Alpha Phi Omega of the Philippines is at 301-A Two Seventy Midtower Condominium, 270 Ermin Garcia Street, Barangay Silangan, Cubao, Quezon City. Past locations of the Alpha Phi Omega of the Philippines national office follow.

| Years | Location | References |
|---|---|---|
| 1950–1975 | Office of Godofredo Neric, Boy Scouts of the Philippines National Headquarters Building, 181 Concepcion Street, Ermita, Manila | |
| 1975–1977 | Residence of Dr. Librado I. Ureta in Taytay, Rizal | |
| 1977–1978 | Residence of Mel S. Gonzales Jr. in Tondo, Manila | |
| 1978–1983 | Office of Jose V. Cutaran in Cubao, Quezon City, Metro Manila | |
| 1983–1986 | Office of Efren Neri at Comfoods building in Gil Puyat Avenue, Makati, Metro Manila | |
| 1986–1988 | Office of Col. Oscar V. Lazo Jr. at Borres building in Cubao, Quezon City, Metro Manila | |
| 1988–1993 | Don Calvo building in Escolta, Manila (Leased) | |
| 1993–1999 | 2nd Floor, V.V. Soliven Complex, Epifanio de los Santos Avenue, San Juan, Metro Manila (Leased) | |
| 1999 – current | 301-A Midtower Condominium, 270 Ermin Garcia Street, Barangay Silangan, Cubao, Quezon City, Metro Manila | |

=== Australia ===
Alpha Phi Omega currently has a chapter at James Cook University.

=== Canada ===
Alpha Phi Omega has a chapter at University of British Columbia. The group at UBC became a Petitioning Group on July 18, 2015. They chartered on December 13, 2015. National conventions in Canada will remain an extension of Alpha Phi Omega USA until there is a presence on five campuses.

== Membership ==
Alpha Phi Omega of the United States offers active membership (brotherhood) to be granted to all students enrolled at colleges and universities with active chapters of Alpha Phi Omega. Individual chapters are granted flexibility in determining the level of activity of Graduate Students at their institution. Honorary membership may be granted by either active chapters or by the National Board of Directors.

Until the 1967 Constitutional Convention, current or former membership in Scouting was a requirement to become an active brother. For example, in the Alpha Phi Omega National Constitution in 1957:

Article III, Section 2: Active membership shall be granted to college students who are or have been previously affiliated with the Boy Scouts of America or any Boy Scout Movement recognized by the International Association, and no restrictions as to Scout rank attained shall be imposed as a membership qualification.

Members were never required to have been Boy Scouts. For example, Bill Clinton was a Cub Scout, but not a Scout while growing up and was able to join Alpha Phi Omega as a student. The bylaws also allowed for men to qualify by registering with their local council as a merit badge counselor in the College Scouter Reserve or other similar positions.

In 1976, the delegates at the national convention amended the bylaws allowing women to join the fraternity. At the time, the changes allowed individual chapters to convert to allow men and women, but the choice was not forced on chapters; any chapter that was chartered or rechartered at the time was required to be coeducational. In July 2005, a Board of Directors Resolution was adopted clarifying the National Fraternity's membership policies by mandating coeducational membership. The resolution was upheld at the 2006 Alpha Phi Omega National Convention in Louisville, Kentucky. Per this resolution, the all-male chapters would be required to comply with the mandate or lose national organizational recognition. This led to all active chapters becoming coeducational and a few leaving and forming Alpha Delta, a fraternity still restricted to men.

In addition to being coeducational, one thing that further differentiates Alpha Phi Omega from social fraternities is that its national bylaws restrict its chapters from maintaining fraternity houses to serve as residences for their members. This also encourages members of social fraternities and sororities that have houses to join APO as well.

== National conventions ==
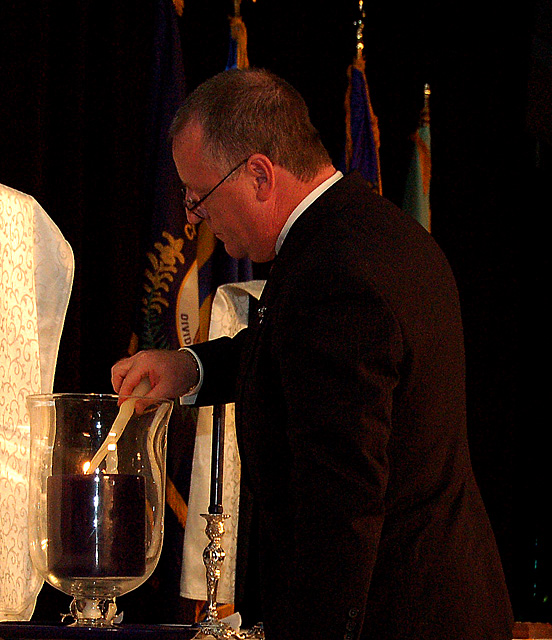
Past National President, Fred Heismeyer, lights the convention's eternal flame at the 2006 APO-USA national convention in Louisville, Kentucky.

National conventions in Alpha Phi Omega are biennial gatherings of the respective national organization of the fraternity, in which official business is conducted, and brothers from the various chapters in the organization meet to share ideas, expanding leadership, friendship, and service. In the very early years, decisions of the National Fraternity were conducted by mail. The first actual assembly of delegates in a convention was held in St. Louis, Missouri, on March 1–2, 1931. Seven of the fraternity's eighteen chapters were represented at this convention by a total of 23 students and advisors.

Alpha Phi Omega of the United States hosts biennial national conventions during even-numbered years. Conventions were not held in 1942 and 1944 due to World War II, and a special Constitutional Convention was held in 1967. Alpha Phi Omega of the Philippines conducts biennial national conventions in odd-numbered years.

In the US, national conventions are officially called to order by an opening ceremony in which the Eternal Flame of Service is brought forth by members of the Delta Omega chapter at the University of Houston. This tradition was started after the twenty-first national convention in Dallas, Texas. In the early hours of December 30, 1970, the delegates of the Delta Omega chapter met in a ceremony in the suite of H. Roe Bartle, with the newly elected members of the National Board of Directors and National President Aubrey B. Hamilton. Bartle lit a small blue candle that he, in turn, used to light a hurricane lamp, which was then passed from the blue candle to each of the board members' candles. He then joined the board members to light two four-foot candles. The flame was then taken to Houston and allowed to burn while awaiting the completion of the Eternal Flame site.

Convention attendance has grown considerably through the years. The largest convention attendance in the US to date has been 2,316 in New Orleans, Louisiana, in 2002, and the largest number of chapters represented was 235 in Philadelphia, Pennsylvania, in 2000.

== See also ==
- Alpha Delta social fraternity
- Epsilon Tau Pi (Eagle Scouts)
- Gamma Sigma Sigma service sorority
- Omega Phi Alpha service sorority
