= Alpha Delta =

Alpha Delta (ΑΔ) may refer to:

- Alpha Delta (Dartmouth), a defunct local organization at Dartmouth College
- Alpha Delta (national), an American social fraternity
- Alpha Delta (recognition), a defunct journalistic recognition society
- Alpha Delta (sorority), a regional sorority in New York that devolved into eight similarly named local sororities
- Alpha Delta (Washburn), a local fraternity at Washburn University
