= OPE =

OPE or Ope may refer to:

- Ope, an American English interjection used to express surprise or mild apology
- Camp Opemikon
- Operator product expansion
- One Photon Excitation, see also Nonlinear optics
- Ope, a locality in Jämtland County, Sweden
- Street name for opium
- Ope Pasquet (born 1956), Uruguayan politician and lawyer
- Ope Peleseuma (born 1992), New Zealand rugby union footballer
- Operational Preparation of the Environment, US and Russian Intelligence strategic planning technique
- organophosphate ester, a pollutant most commonly in pesticides
- Outdoor Power Equipment, like lawn mowers, leaf blowers etc.

== See also ==
- Clay Ope
- Church Ope Cove
