= List of Alpha Phi Omega national conventions =

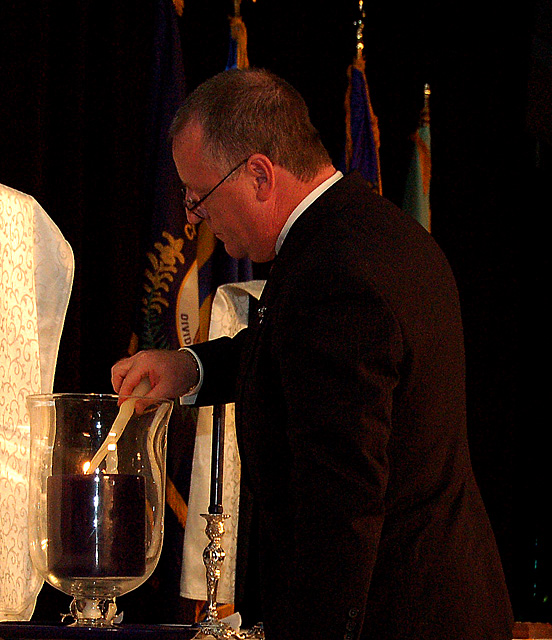
Past National President, Dr. Fred Heismeyer, lights the convention candle with the Eternal Flame of Service at the 2006 APO-USA national convention in Louisville, Kentucky.

National conventions in Alpha Phi Omega are biennial gatherings of the respective national organization of the fraternity, in which official business is conducted and brothers from the various chapters in the organization meet to share ideas and expand leadership, friendship, and service. In the very early years, decisions of the National Fraternity were conducted by mail. The first actual assembly of delegates in a convention was held in St. Louis, Missouri, on March 1–2, 1931. Seven of the fraternity's eighteen chapters were represented at this convention by 23 students and advisors.

Alpha Phi Omega of the United States conducts biennial national conventions in even-numbered years, and as of 2016, forty-four conventions have been held. The last convention held was in Austin, Texas and the next will be held in Phoenix, Arizona. Conventions were not held in 1942 and 1944 due to World War II, and a special Constitutional Convention was held in 1967. Alpha Phi Omega of the Philippines conducts biennial national conventions in odd-numbered years, and as of 2009, twenty-five conventions have been held.

In the US, national conventions are officially called to order by an opening ceremony in which members of the Delta Omega chapter at the University of Houston bring forth the Eternal Flame of Service. This tradition was started after the twenty-first national convention in Dallas, Texas. In the early hours of December 30, 1970, the delegates of the Delta Omega chapter met in a ceremony in the suite of H. Roe Bartle, with the newly elected members of the National Board of Directors and National President Aubrey B. Hamilton. Bartle lit a small blue candle which he in turn used to light a hurricane lamp, which was then passed from the blue candle to each of the board members' candles. He then joined the board members to light two four-foot candles. The flame was then taken to Houston and allowed to burn while awaiting the completion of the Eternal Flame site.

Convention attendance has grown considerably through the years. In 1932, 88 members were attending the convention and the largest convention attendance in the US to date has been 2,316 in New Orleans, Louisiana in 2002, and the largest number of chapters represented was 235 in Philadelphia, Pennsylvania in 2000.

== United States ==
Convention number	Dates	Location	Theme	Attendance (attendees / chapters)	References
1st	December 1926	Mailed ballot		? / 1	
2nd	September 1928 and December 1928	Cornell University; Ithaca, New York	Held Concurrently with the 5th National Training Conference for Scout Executives	? / 6	(Note: The convention was held in September 1926 concurrently with the Fifth National Training Conference of Scout Executives. This conference was held from September 6 to 12, 1928 The detailed voting occurred by Mail Ballot held in December 1926.)
3rd	March 1, 1931 – March 2, 1931	Jefferson Hotel; St. Louis, Missouri		23 / 9	
4th	December 28, 1932 – December 29, 1932	La Salle Hotel; Chicago, Illinois		88 / ?	
5th	December 28, 1934 – December 29, 1934	Hotel President; Kansas City, Missouri		230 / 21, 14 interest groups	
6th	September 4, 1936 – September 6, 1936	Camp Manatoc; Akron, Ohio	Tenth Anniversary Celebration	? / 26	
7th	December 28, 1938 – December 29, 1938	Hotel DeSoto; St. Louis, Missouri		274 / 51	
8th	December 28, 1940 – December 29, 1940	Antlers Hotel; Indianapolis, Indiana	Service: Our Contribution to Americanism on College campuses.	312 / 54	
9th	December 28, 1946 – December 29, 1946	Hotel President; Kansas City, Missouri	Service: Our Contribution to a Peaceful World.	349 / 71	(Note: Conventions were not held during World War II (1942 and 1944). The 1942 Convention was planned for Kansas City, Missouri, and was changed by a vote of the chapters to a mail ballot at the request of the Office of Defense Transportation (ODT))
10th	December 28, 1948 – December 30, 1948	La Salle Hotel; Chicago, Illinois	To Put Service to Others Ahead of Selfish Aims.	602 / 121	
11th	December 28, 1950 – December 30, 1950	Fort Des Moines Hotel; Des Moines, Iowa	25th Anniversary: The Past, Present, and Future of Alpha Phi Omega.	~600 / 119	
12th	December 28, 1952 – December 30, 1952	Deshler-Wallick Hotel; Columbus, Ohio	Service Above Selfish Aims.	~500 / 135	
13th	December 28, 1954 – December 30, 1954	Schroeder Hotel; Milwaukee, Wisconsin	Service Past, Present, and Future.	600+ / 121	
14th	Aug 28, 1956 – Aug 30, 1956	Wilton Hotel; Long Beach, California		300+ / 85	
15th	Aug 29, 1958 – Sep 1, 1958	Stephen F. Austin Hotel; Austin, Texas	The Lone Star State in '58.	400+ / 97	
16th	December 28, 1960 – December 30, 1960	Benjamin Franklin Hotel; Philadelphia, Pennsylvania	35th Anniversary	843 / 156	
17th	December 27, 1962 – December 29, 1962	University of Kansas City and Bellerive Hotel; Kansas City, Missouri	Lead in Service.	? / 156+	
18th	December 27, 1964 – December 29, 1964	Brown Palace Hotel; Denver, Colorado	40th Anniversary	713 / 163	
19th	December 27, 1966 – December 29, 1966	Radisson Hotel; Minneapolis, Minnesota	In Brotherhood- Carry On.	1,000+ / 210+	
	December 27, 1967 – December 29, 1967	University of Oklahoma; Norman, Oklahoma	Constitutional Convention	247 / 247	(Note: The 1967 Constitutional Convention in Norman, Oklahoma is not considered a National Convention, as it was a special conference. Only one delegate per chapter was allowed to attend.)
20th	December 27, 1968 – December 29, 1968	Shoreham Hotel; Washington, D.C.	Hand in Hand In Service.	1,603 / 273	
21st	December 27, 1970 – December 29, 1970	Marriott Motor Hotel; Dallas, Texas	The Three Worlds of Alpha Phi Omega, Tell It Like It Is, Let's Be Significant.		
22nd	December 27, 1972 – December 29, 1972	Denver Hilton; Denver, Colorado	Extend A Helping Hand To Your Fellow Man.	~1,000 / ?	
23rd	December 27, 1974 – December 29, 1974	Stouffer's Riverfront Inn; St. Louis, Missouri	Golden Opportunities to Serve.	900+ / ?	
24th	December 27, 1976 – December 29, 1976	Marriott Motor Hotel; Atlanta, Georgia	Service - The Spirit of '76.	~1,100 / ?	
25th	December 27, 1978 – December 29, 1978	Opryland Hotel; Nashville, Tennessee	A Bold Heritage - A Bright Future.	~1,000 / ?	
26th	December 27, 1980 – December 29, 1980	Marriott Hotel; Los Angeles, California	Lighting the World Through Service.	632 / ?	
27th	December 28, 1982 – December 30, 1982	Hyatt Regency; Kansas City, Missouri	Show Me Service.	922 / ?	
28th	December 28, 1984 – December 30, 1984	Hyatt Regency Washington on Capitol Hill; Washington, D.C.	A Monument to Service.	1,425 / ?	
29th	December 28, 1986 – December 30, 1986	Hyatt Regency Houston; Houston, Texas	Service - The Finest Frontier.	1,334 / 149	
30th	December 27, 1988 – December 30, 1988	Denver Marriott City Center; Denver, Colorado	Service Above All.	993 / 128	
31st	December 27, 1990 – December 30, 1990	Clarion Hotel; St. Louis, Missouri	Service - Gateway to Our Future.	1,430 / 188	
32nd	December 27, 1992 – December 30, 1992	Boston Park Plaza; Boston, Massachusetts	Leading the Way to Service.	2,000 / ~220	
33rd	December 27, 1994 – December 30, 1994	Hyatt Regency DFW Airport; DFW Airport, Texas	Deep in the Heart of Service.	1,940 / 222	
34th	December 27, 1996 – December 30, 1996	Hyatt Regency; Phoenix, Arizona	Rising to Serve.	1,585 / ~210	
35th	December 27, 1998 – December 30, 1998	Hyatt Regency; Minneapolis, Minnesota	Leadership, Friendship, and Service: SnowBalled Into One.	1,781 / 227	
36th	December 27, 2000 – December 30, 2000	Philadelphia Marriott Downtown Center City; Philadelphia, Pennsylvania	Celebrating our Heritage, Forging Our Future.	2,086 / 235	
37th	December 27, 2002 – December 30, 2002	Sheraton New Orleans; New Orleans, Louisiana	Brotherhood on the Bayou	2,316 / ?	
38th	December 27, 2004 – December 30, 2004	Adam's Mark; Denver, Colorado	Service at its Peak	1,488 / ?	
39th	December 27, 2006 – December 30, 2006	Galt House; Louisville, Kentucky	Unbridled Service	1,652 / ?	
40th	December 27, 2008 – December 30, 2008	Sheraton Boston; Boston, Massachusetts	Revolutionary Brotherhood	2,075 / ?	
41st	December 27, 2010 – December 30, 2010	Hyatt Regency Atlanta; Atlanta, Georgia	Dream * Lead * Serve		
42nd	December 27, 2012 – December 30, 2012	Anaheim Marriott Hotel; Anaheim, California	Time to Shine	1,579 / ?	
43rd	December 27, 2014 – December 30, 2014	Hyatt Regency O'Hare; Chicago, Illinois	Inspire, Innovate, IGNITE		
44th	December 27, 2016 – December 30, 2016	Westin Convention Center Pittsburgh; Pittsburgh, Pennsylvania	This is Our Story		
45th	December 27, 2018 – December 30, 2018	JW Marriott Austin; Austin, Texas	Building Community	1,330 / ?	
46th	December 28, 2020 – December 29, 2020	Virtual			(Note: Convention was planned for JW Marriott Phoenix Desert Ridge Resort & Spa in Phoenix, Arizona but was canceled due to the COVID-19 pandemic.)
47th	December 27, 2021 – January 5, 2022	Virtual			
48th	December 27, 2023 – December 30, 2023	Indianapolis Marriott Downtown; Indianapolis, Indiana		~560 / ?	
49th	December 27, 2025 – December 30, 2025	Philadelphia, Pennsylvania			

== Philippines ==
National conventions for Alpha Phi Omega Philippines are biennial gatherings that are currently conducted in odd-numbered years. It is where official business is conducted by the General Assembly composed of brothers and sisters from the various chapters and alumni/alumnae associations meeting to share ideas and to expand leadership, friendship, and service. Following are the past conventions held in the Philippines.

Convention number	Dates	Location	Theme	Host	Refs
1st	September 13, 1953	Philippine Normal College Auditorium; Ermita, Manila	Unity for Service	Beta chapter	
2nd	December 17, 1955 – December 18, 1955	Boy Scouts of the Philippines Building; Ermita, Manila		Epsilon chapter	
3rd	December 6, 1958 – December 7, 1958	Boy Scouts of the Philippines Building; Ermita, Manila and University of the Philippines, Diliman; Diliman, Quezon City		Eta chapter	
4th	December 18, 1960 – December 19, 1960	University of the Philippines, Los Baños; Los Baños, Laguna		Theta chapter	
5th	December 22, 1962 – December 23, 1962	National University; Sampaloc, Manila	Revitalizing the Alpha Phi Omega Spirit	Beta chapter	
6th	March 6, 1965 – March 7, 1965	Mapúa Institute of Technology; Intramuros, Manila	Humility, Integrity, Honesty for a Better Nation	Delta chapter	
7th	December 15, 1968 – December 16, 1968	Far Eastern University; Sampaloc, Manila	For God and Country	Alpha chapter	
8th	December 17, 1971 – December 19, 1971	University of the Philippines, Los Baños; Los Baños, Laguna	Alpha Phi Omega Answers the Nation's Call	Theta chapter	
9th	March 25, 1976 – March 28, 1976	Baptist Camp; Mariveles, Bataan	Alpha Phi Omega: Its Role in Contemporary Philippines	National Council	(Note: Convention was temporarily suspended due to the imposition of Martial Law by Philippine President Ferdinand Marcos. Group assembly without approval was punishable by incarceration.)
10th	March 30, 1979 – April 1, 1979	Camp 7 Minglanilla, Cebu	Towards the Strengthening of Organizational Leadership in the Alpha Phi Omega in the Next Decade	Region VII and National Council	
11th	December 27, 1981 – December 30, 1981	Kabataang Barangay Training Center, Malasag; Cagayan de Oro	The Fraternity and Sorority: Their Relevance and Challenges in the 80's	Region X and National Council	
12th	May 27, 1983 – May 29, 1983	Bagong Lipunan Settlement Project; Bamban, Tarlac	Continuing Accent on Organizational Development and Service	Region III and National Council	
13th	December 14, 1985 – December 16, 1985	Boy Scouts of the Philippines Camp; Mount Makiling, Los Baños, Laguna	Alpha Phi Omega Ideology: A New Dimension Towards Genuine Service and Commitment	National Council	
14th	December 19, 1987 – December 21, 1987	People's Center Tacloban City/Commission on Audit Training Center; Palo, Leyte	Professionalism (in A PHI O) toward National Solidarity	Region VIII and National Council	
15th	May 26, 1989 – May 28, 1989	Girl Scouts of the Philippines Camp; Alano, Toril, Davao City	Service for Peace (Paglilingkod Para sa Kapayapaan)	Region XI and National Council	
16th	May 24, 1991 – May 26, 1991	Bulwagang Balagtas, Polytechnic University of the Philippines, Manila; Santa Mesa, Manila	Reflections: The APhiO Culture (Balik-Tanaw:Ang Kulturang APhiO)	NCR and National Council	
17th	May 21, 1993 – May 23, 1993	University of the Philippines, Visayas; Miag-ao, Iloilo	The Alpha Phi Omega and the Filipino Values	Region VI and National Council	
18th	May 27, 1995 – May 29, 1995	Feliciano and Sons Convention Center; Tetuan, Zamboanga City	Think Global, Act Local	Region IX and National Council	
19th	May 2, 1997 – May 4, 1997	Teachers Camp; Baguio, Benguet	Brotherhood...Its True and Honorable Essence in Retrospect	Region I and National Council	
20th	May 7, 1999 – May 9, 1999	Green Heights Convention and Business Center; Buhangin, Davao City	Towards the Golden Year: A Force to Reckon With	Region XI	
21st	May 25, 2001 – May 27, 2001	George Dewey Convention Center; Subic Bay Freeport, Olongapo City, Zambales	Zoom! Into the 21st Century	Region III and National Council	
22nd	May 22, 2003 – May 25, 2003	Garden Royale Convention Center, Goldenfields Commercial Complex; Bacolod, Negros Occidental	Capturing a New Generation of Leaders	Region VI-B and National Council	
23rd	May 25, 2005 – May 28, 2005	Provincial Convention Center Capitol Hills and New Surigao City Government Complex; Surigao City, Surigao del Norte	APO Now and Beyond: Sustaining the Gains of Leadership, Friendship, and Service	Surigao City Alumni Association, Epsilon Gamma chapter, and National Council	
24th	May 3, 2007 – May 6, 2007	Tagaytay International Convention Center; Tagaytay	Bridging Generations Through Service.	Kabite Alumni Association, Sigma Alumni Association, and Mississauga Alumni Association	
25th	May 28, 2009 – May 31, 2009	Ecovillage Resort and Convention Center; Boracay Island, Aklan	Great Leap Forward, Towards Excellence	APO Boracay	
26th	May 26, 2011 – May 29, 2011	Grand Caprice Convention Center, Limketkai Center; Lapasan, Cagayan de Oro	One Vision in The Second Decade of the Third Millennium	Oro City Alumni Association	
27th	May 23, 2013 – May 26, 2013	Legazpi City; Albay	Together as one: Rooted and Grounded on Service	Gamma Xi Alumni Association	
28th	May 21, 2015 – May 24, 2015	Lamberto L. Macias Sports Complex and Cultural Center; Dumaguete, Negros Oriental	Leadership, Friendship, and Service Toward Peace, Unity, and Progress	Negros Oriental Alumni Association, Gamma chapter, and Negros Oriental State University Petitioning chapter	
29th	May 26, 2017 – May 28, 2017	Lagao Gymnasium; General Santos	Facing the Challenges, Bringing APO Together	General Santos City Alumni Association	
30th	May 18, 2018 – May 20, 2018	Subic Bay Exhibition and Conference Center; Subic Bay Freeport, Olongapo City, Zambales	The Road to 100, Ain't no stopping us now!	APO National Office and Region 3	
31st		Plaza del Norte Hotel and Convention Center and Fort Ilocandia Hotel; Laoag City			
