= Alpha Delta (national) =

American college fraternity

- ΑΔ
- Founded: August 4, 2007; 19 years ago Henley Park Hotel; Washington, D.C.
- Type: Social
- Affiliation: Independent
- Former affiliation: Alpha Phi Omega
- Status: Active
- Scope: National
- Motto: "In Brotherhood We Stand, In Service We Rise."
- Pillars: Leadership, Brotherhood, Service
- Colors: Forest green, Old gold, and Onyx black
- Symbol: Great horned owl
- Flower: Daffodil
- Tree: Giant sequoia
- Jewel: Onyx
- Chapters: 5
- Colonies: 1
- Headquarters: Orono, Maine; United States
- Website: www.alphadeltanational.org

Alpha Delta National Fraternity (ΑΔ), commonly known as AD, is a college fraternity with six active chapters in the United States. Alpha Delta was formed on August 4, 2007, by former Alpha Phi Omega chapters that chose to maintain all-male membership after that organization became coeducational.

== History ==
=== Alpha Phi Omega ===
Before the formation of Alpha Delta, Alpha Phi Omega was founded at Lafayette College in Easton, Pennsylvania in 1925 as a fraternal parallel to the Boy Scouts of America. This organization would go on to become one of the largest all-male, Greek-lettered college organizations in the United States, expanding to over 500 colleges and universities nationwide.

In 1972, the United States passed the Title IX educational amendments, which in effect mandated that single-sex collegiate professional and community service organizations must become coeducational, although social fraternities and sororities, as well as sex-specific youth clubs such as the Boy Scouts, were specifically exempt. At the time, Alpha Phi Omega was an all-male national service fraternity, and it was not clear if the amendment applied to the organization.

At the 1976 national convention of Alpha Phi Omega, the fraternity voted to become coeducational in compliance with these new university rules and regulations. Several chapters threatened to disassociate with the organization if they were forced to go coeducational, so a "gentleman's agreement" was made where the national organization would not require existing chapters to admit women as members, but all new chapters to the fraternity would.

Over the following 30 years, many legislative attempts were made internally within Alpha Phi Omega to clarify national membership standards over a chapter's right to remain single-sex. In July 2005, a Board of Directors Resolution was adopted clarifying the National Fraternity's membership policies by mandating coeducational membership. The resolution was upheld at the 2006 Alpha Phi Omega National Convention in Louisville, Kentucky. Per this resolution, the all-male chapters would be required to comply with the mandate or lose national organizational recognition.

=== Alpha Delta ===
A meeting was convened by the all-male chapters at a hotel conference room in Louisville, where the Sigma Xi chapter at the University of Maine, the Zeta Theta chapter of Drexel University, and the Pi Chi chapter of Duquesne University decided to disassociate themselves from the national organization and establish a new fraternity, Alpha Delta National Fraternity. This fraternity was later joined with the other all-male chapters, the Psi Delta chapter at the University of Maine at Machias and the Nu Mu chapter at the University of Minnesota at Duluth.

The Alpha Delta National Fraternity was officially founded on August 14, 2007, at the Henley Park Hotel in Washington, D.C., with fourteen men representing four of the all-male chapters present. The group adopted the Washington Convention Mission Statement, and Alpha Delta was tentatively agreed to be the acting name of the new organization. Later conventions on November 17, 2007, in Boston, Massachusetts, and on January 25, 2008, in Philadelphia, Pennsylvania, established the new national organization's ritual, constitution, bylaws, symbolism, colors, and coat of arms. Its coat of arms was redesigned by Jessica Lewis, a friend of the Zeta Theta chapter at Drexel University, and subsequently redesigned a second time by Bart Brizee of the Sigma Xi chapter at the University of Maine.

The purpose of Alpha Delta is to assemble college men in a national fraternal order as envisioned by its spiritual founder, Frank Reed Horton, and the Boy Scouts of America. This fraternity is dedicated to developing leadership by providing service, forging the bonds of brotherhood regardless of race, creed, or background, and developing an understanding that service to mankind is not only an obligation but a higher calling.

== Symbols ==
Alpha Delta's motto is "In Brotherhood We Stand, In Service We Rise". Its cardinal principles or pillars are Leadership, Brotherhood, and Service. The fraternity's colors are forest green, old gold, and onyx black. Its flower is the daffodil. Its tree is the giant sequoia. Its jewel is onyx. Its symbol is the great horned owl.

== Chapters ==
In the following list, active chapters are indicated in bold, and inactive chapters are in italics. Chapters use their charter dates from the predecessor institution.

Chapter	Charter date and range	Institution	Location	Status	Ref.
**Zeta Theta**	May 16, 1948	Drexel University	Philadelphia, Pennsylvania	Active	
Alpha Beta	December 6, 1959	Indiana University of Pennsylvania	Indiana, Pennsylvania	Inactive	
**Nu Mu**	May 25, 1961	University of Minnesota Duluth	Duluth, Minnesota	Active	
**Pi Chi**	May 15, 1966	Duquesne University	Pittsburgh, Pennsylvania	Active	
**Sigma Xi**	May 15, 1967	University of Maine	Orono, Maine	Active	
**Psi Delta**	May 14, 1972	University of Maine at Machias	Machias, Maine	Active	
**Alpha Gamma**	May 24, 1980	Alcorn State University	Lorman, Mississippi	Colony	
