= Daiei =

Japanese supermarket firm

The Daiei, Inc.
- The current logo by Wolff Olins used since 2005.

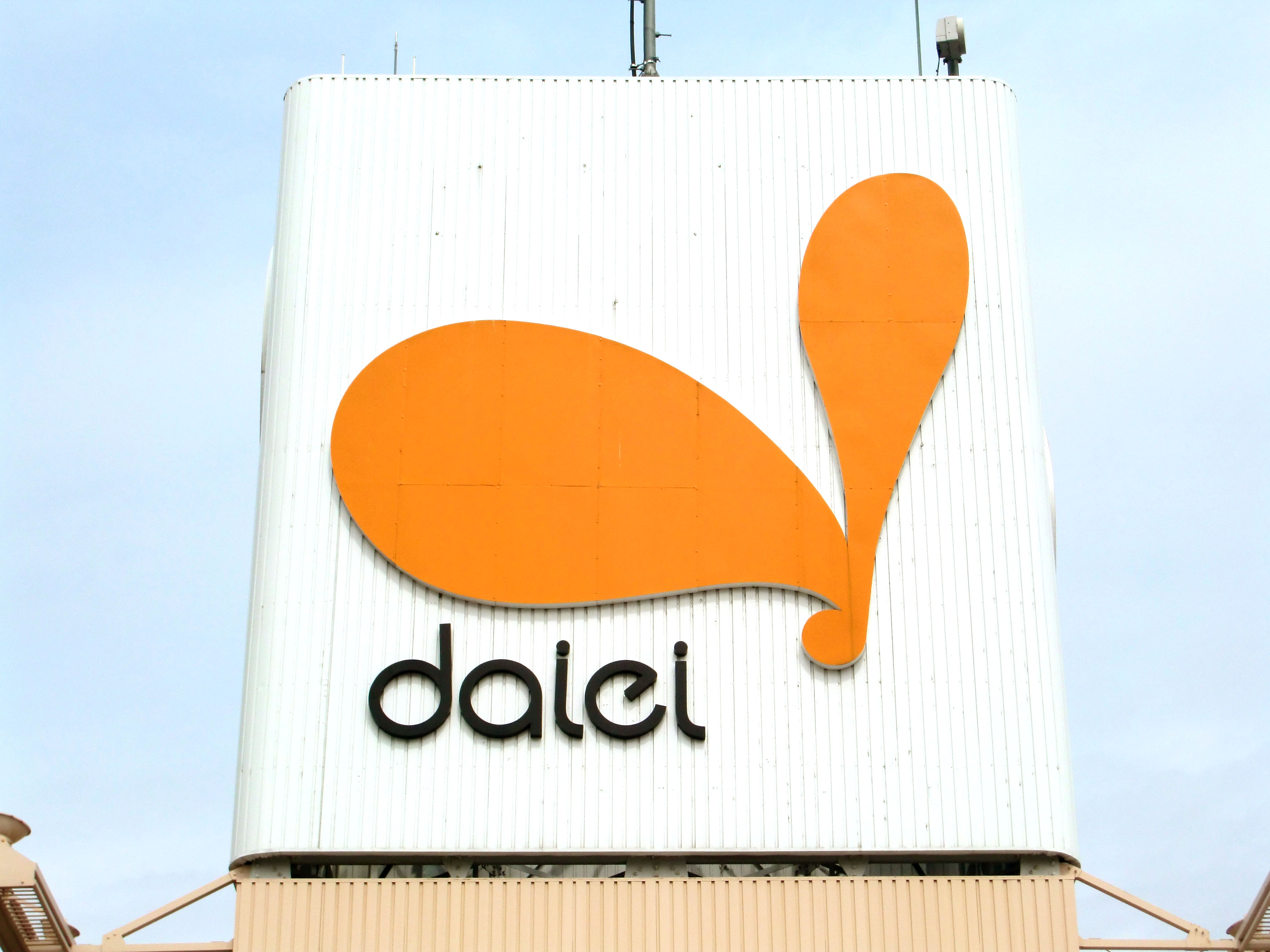
- Native name: 株式会社ダイエー
- Romanized name: Kabushiki gaisha Daiē
- Type: Subsidiary (Kabushiki gaisha)
- Traded as: TYO: 8263 (1972–2014); NAG: 8263 (1972–2008); SSE: 8263 (1974–2008); FSE: 8263 (1972–2008); Nasdaq: DAIEY (1974–2008)
- Industry: Retail
- Founded: 1957 at Osaka, Japan
- Founder: Isao Nakauchi
- Headquarters: Kobe, Hyōgo Prefecture, Japan
- Key people: Yoshiki Mori (Chairman); Yasuhide Chikazawa (President)
- Products: Hypermarkets and supermarkets
- Revenue: ▲¥1,431.5 billion (2005)
- Number of employees: full-time; 6979
- Parent: Aeon
- Subsidiaries: OMC Card, OPA Co., Ltd.
- Website: www.daiei.co.jp

The Daiei, Inc. (株式会社ダイエー, Kabushiki gaisha Daiē) is a Japanese supermarket chain owned by Aeon. The company was founded in Osaka in 1957 by Isao Nakauchi, opening its first location near Sembayashi Station.

By 1972, Daiei had become Japan's top retailer by sales, and in 1980, it became the first Japanese retail company to surpass 1 trillion yen in annual revenue. At its peak, it was one of Japan's leading retail conglomerates, diversifying its operations into burger chains, convenience stores, and restaurant businesses.

However, the company suffered a severe financial decline following the collapse of the Japanese asset price bubble in the early 1990s, and the Great Hanshin earthquake in 1995. Although Aeon, Japan's largest multinational retail holding company, joined Marubeni in 2007 in an effort to restructure the company, Daiei's financial situation failed to improve, ultimately leading to its full acquisition by Aeon in 2014.

Following a restructuring involving other Aeon-owned supermarkets, Daiei's operations were consolidated exclusively to the Kansai region—its founding area—by 2026. The Daiei brand name is also scheduled to be completely transitioned to the Food Style banner by 2030.

== History ==
The retail chain expanded rapidly in the 1970s and 1980s. Also, stronger sales from competitors such as Ito-Yokado, ÆON, and other regional supermarket chains have hurt Daiei's sales record in recent years.

As a part of the series of bootstrap restructuring efforts to avoid filing for IRCJ (Industrial Revitalization Corporation of Japan) support, the company sold its baseball team, the Fukuoka Daiei Hawks, which it purchased from Nankai Railway in 1988 to SoftBank, on January 27, 2005 and the company's Hawaii stores in 2006 to Don Quijote Co., Ltd. Through the process of debt restructuring and support given by financial institutions in coordination with IRCJ, the company has been acquired by IRCJ, Marubeni Corporation (a trading company) and Advantage Partners (a private equity house) in 2005.

Daiei's current president is Yasuo Nishitoge.

=== Private brand ===
Daiei carries multiple private label brands, and the biggest one they carry is Topvalu (トップバリュ) which started in 2007. Topvalu products are sold by ÆON Co., Ltd. and Daiei.

== Gallery ==
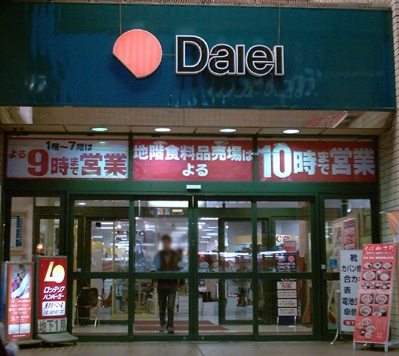
A Daiei store

Topvalu logo

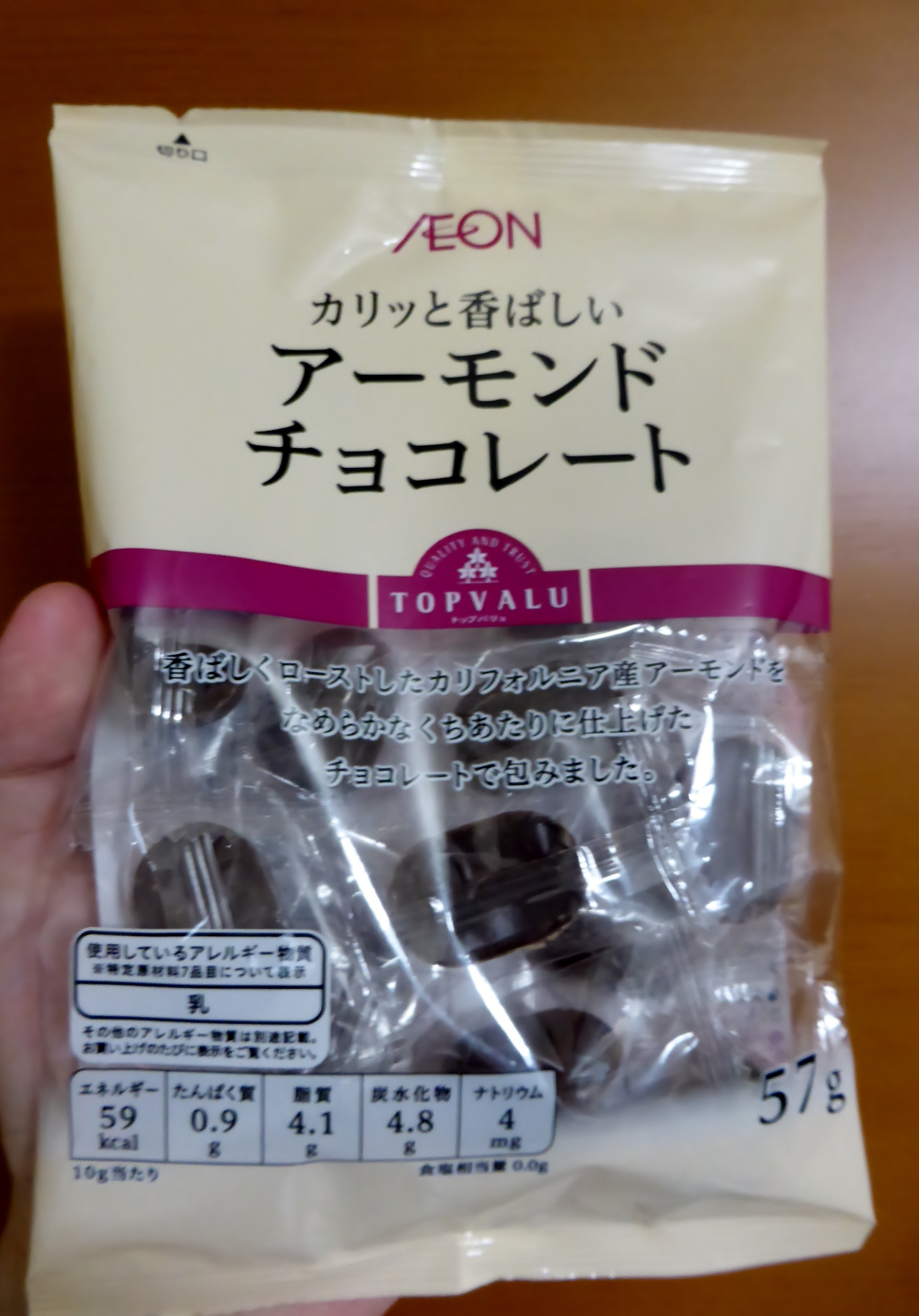
Topvalu almond chocolate snack

== See also ==
- Zombie company
