= Isao Nakauchi =

Japanese businessman

Isao Nakauchi (中内 功; August 2, 1922, in Osaka, Japan – September 19, 2005) was the founder of Daiei.

== Life and career ==
Isao Nakauchi served in the Philippines as an infantryman during World War II. His business empire started in Osaka 1957 and it led to the creation of "American-style" supermarkets in Japan. In 1972 he led the biggest retailer in Japan, one that owned a store in Hawaii and a baseball team. The 1980s proved more difficult for the business as its competition and debts increased. He stepped down in 2002 and in 2004 he sold his stocks in the company. In 2005, he died of a stroke according to The University of Marketing and Distribution Sciences in Kobe, which he had founded.
