= Hopa River =

River in Turkey

Coordinates: 41°23′36″N 41°25′00″E

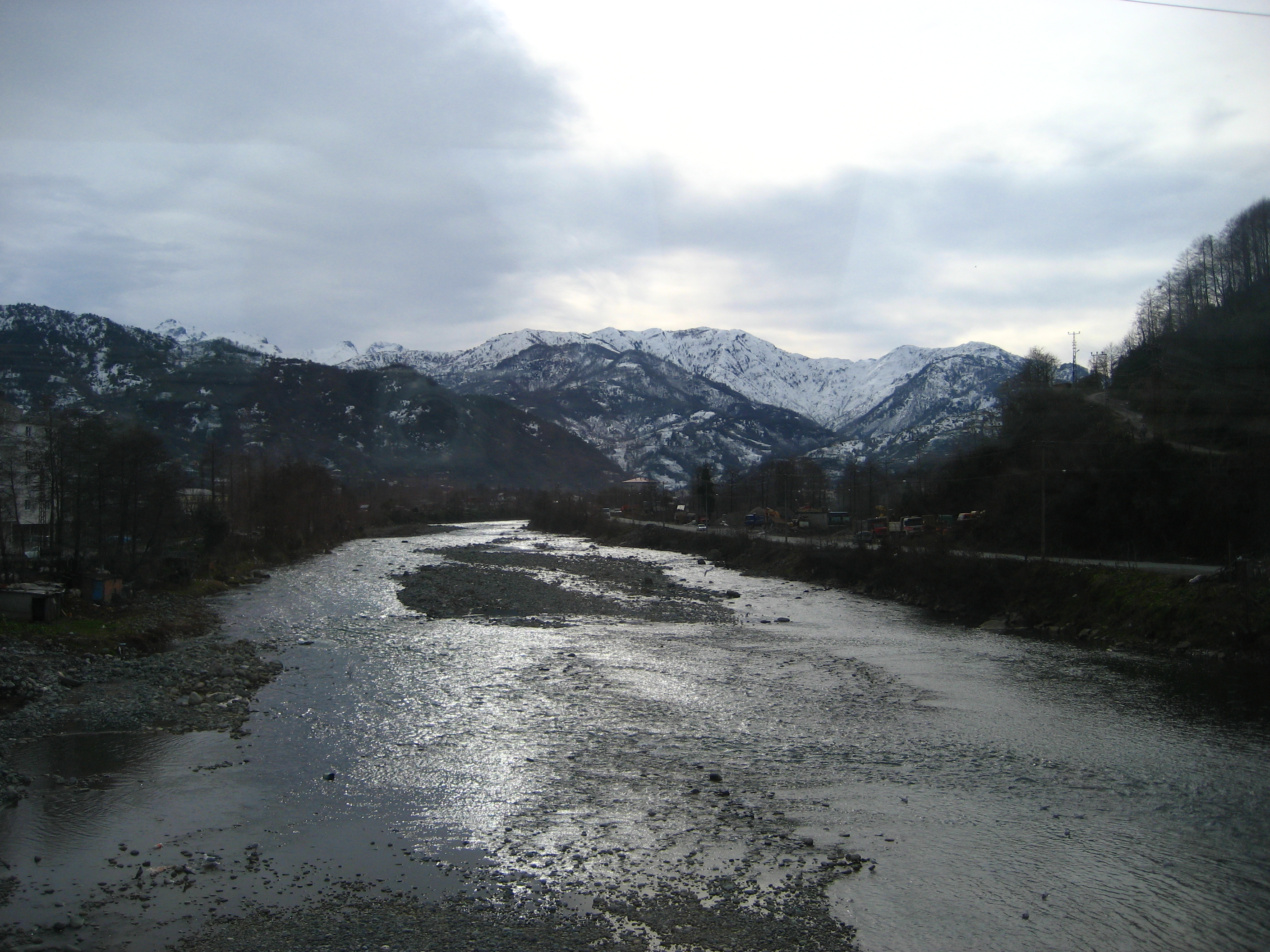
Hopa River

The Hopa River is the main water stream of Hopa in the eastern Black Sea region of Turkey. The Hopa River basin is rich in terms of alluvial deposits which formed in the Pleistocene.
