= Malus 'Hopa' =

Crabapple cultivar

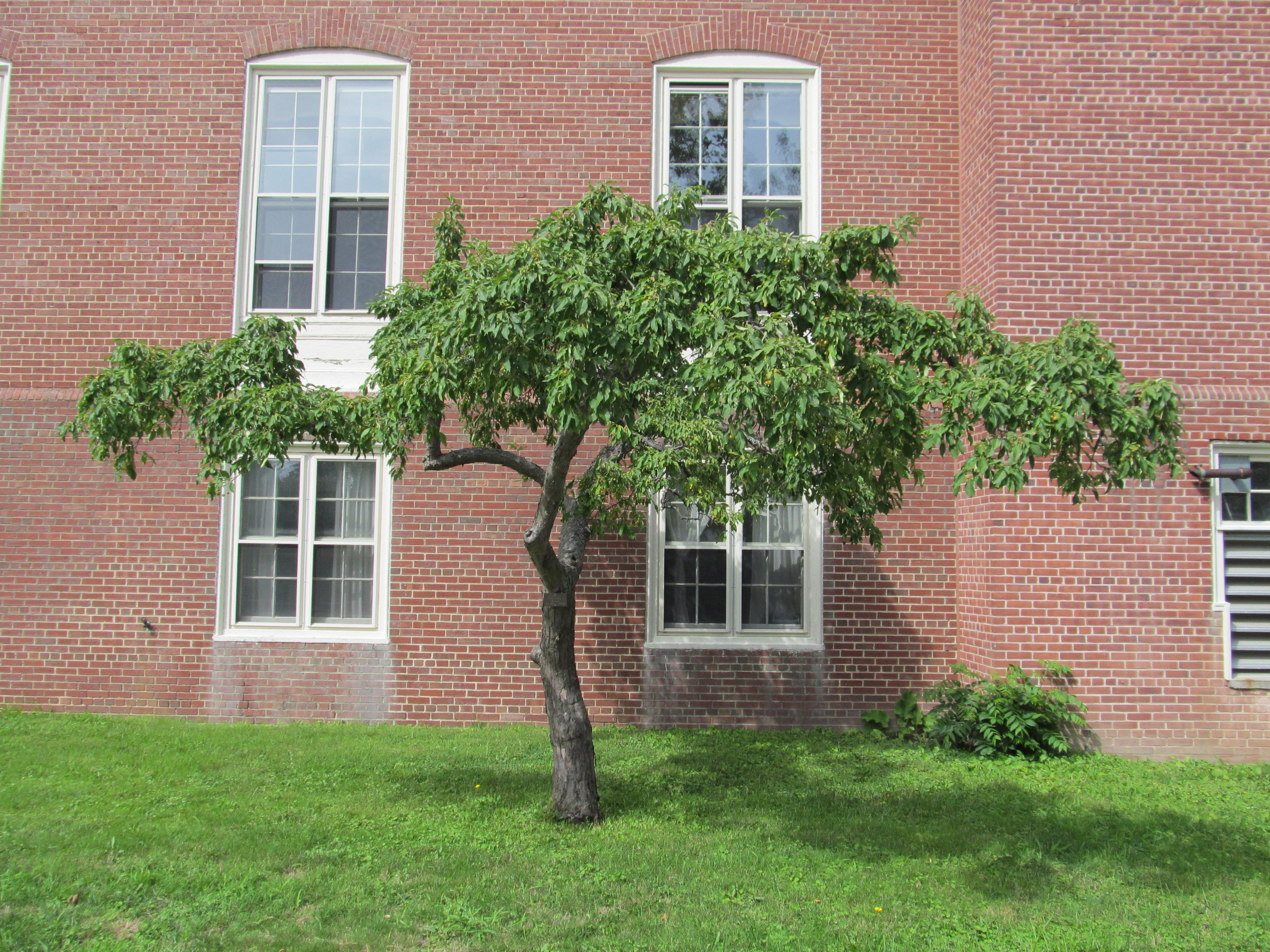
- Hopa flowering crabapple
- Genus: Malus
- Cultivar: Malus 'Hopa'

Malus 'Hopa', occasionally known as Hopa flowering crabapple, is a hybrid cultivar in the genus Malus, in the family Rosaceae. It was created by Niels Ebbesen Hansen.

Sensitive to Juglone
