= Oregon Potters Association =

Group of clay artists in US

The Oregon Potters Association (OPA) is not-for-profit group of clay artists working in Oregon and southwest Washington, United States.

The OPA seeks to bring its members together with the public, galleries, businesses, publications and arts agencies locally, nationally and globally. Its members organize cooperative purchases to obtain pottery supplies, books and materials at quantity discount prices. They help and enable members to publicize, exhibit and sell their work at the annual OPA Ceramic Showcase and in conjunction with other guilds, fairs, and craft organizations.
