= Ope (interjection) =

Midwestern English interjection expressing surprise or mild apology

Ope is an interjection in American English, often associated with the Midwestern United States, used to express mild surprise, acknowledge a minor social infraction, or politely signal one's presence. It frequently appears in phrases such as "Ope, let me squeeze past ya" or "Ope, sorry about that." Though popularly considered a distinctly Midwestern expression, linguists have noted that the underlying sound occurs across the English-speaking world, including in Canada and the United Kingdom.

Ope gained widespread attention beginning in 2017 through media coverage and internet memes celebrating Midwestern cultural identity, and received further national prominence during the 2024 U.S. presidential election when Minnesota Governor Tim Walz, the Democratic vice-presidential nominee, used the word spontaneously at a campaign rally in Eau Claire, Wisconsin.

== Etymology and phonetics ==
The precise origin of ope is uncertain, and linguists have characterized it as unusually difficult to trace. Indiana University professor Michael Adams told HuffPost in 2017 that "trying to figure out the etymology of it, all you've really got to go on is just the speculation." Lexicographer Grant Barrett, co-host of the radio program A Way with Words and vice president of the American Dialect Society, similarly cautioned that "interjections and ejaculations are particularly difficult to source, so I would be extremely surprised if there were a verified definitive answer."

=== Phonetic explanation ===
Barrett has argued that ope is not strictly a word in the conventional sense but rather a vocalization produced by the physical mechanics of speech. He explains that the sound occurs when a speaker abruptly stops exhaling, typically upon being startled or noticing something unexpected. This brings the lips together, creating what linguists term an excrescent bilabial plosive (a "p" sound). The result is a brief utterance resembling "ope" or "oop."

Barrett also argues that the common word "oops" is itself the formalized, written version of this reflexive sound, rather than ope being a shortening of "oops." As Barrett told Wisconsin Public Radio: "[Ope] doesn't come from 'oops,' 'oops' comes from [ope]." The same phonetic process produces analogous forms in English, where words acquire a trailing bilabial stop: "well" becomes "whelp," "no" becomes "nope," and "yeah" becomes "yep."

Linguist Ben Zimmer offered a compatible analysis, noting that ope "clearly shares a resemblance with 'oops' (and in fact is sometimes spelled 'oop')," but that "when it's said as 'ope,' it could also be thought of as the 'oh' interjection plus a final '-p,' the same kind of '-p' that we hear at the end of 'yep,' 'nope,' and 'welp.'"

=== Origins in the Midwest ===
Betsy Sneller, co-director of Michigan State University's Sociolinguistics Lab, has noted that "'ope' has been a feature of Midwest speech longer than Midwest speech has been analyzed," making it difficult to settle on a single origin. One theory posits that the word was brought by Norwegian immigrants who settled in the Minnesota–Wisconsin region, though Sneller notes that "there's not a word in Norwegian that is 'ope.'"

== Usage ==
Ope functions as a versatile interjection applicable to a wide range of everyday situations. Common uses include acknowledging a minor collision or near-collision with another person ("Ope, didn't see you there"), politely signaling an attempt to pass someone in a tight space ("Ope, let me just scoot by you"), reacting to a small mistake or accident ("Ope, let me get that"), expressing mild surprise at unexpected information ("Ope!"), and softening an interruption ("Ope, didn't mean to cut you off").

Perry described ope as "barely a word, and more of a guttural reaction" that "almost sounds like a tiny heave," effectively translating to "I don't mean to bother you or anyone around me, ever, but I've noticed..." She compared its linguistic versatility to the Italian word prego, which similarly serves multiple conversational functions. HuffPost writer Todd Van Luling characterized it as having "essentially earned multiple meanings while still remaining entirely undefined." Unlike "oops," which typically signals the acknowledgment of a mistake, ope operates at what Perry called "a degree below," addressing the most minor of social infractions that non-Midwesterners might not register at all, such as brushing shoulders with a stranger in a supermarket aisle.

Sneller's research through the MI Diaries Project has found variation in how the word is used even within a single state. Some Michiganders use ope as a substitute for "I'm sorry," while others use it to draw attention to something noteworthy: "It doesn't just mean 'Sorry, I'm about to bother you in some way.' It can also mean that I'm about to say something nice, like, 'Ope, it's sunny in December.'" Sneller classifies ope as a discourse marker, a word or phrase that fills a gap in a sentence, sometimes signaling that the speaker is still talking, is about to say something of interest, or is about to apologize. Its function as a discourse marker makes it relatively easy for transplants and non-native English speakers to adopt.

== Regional and cultural associations ==
=== Midwestern identity ===
Ope is most strongly associated with the Midwestern United States, particularly the states of Minnesota, Wisconsin, Michigan, Iowa, Illinois, and Ohio. The word has been described as emblematic of broader patterns of "Midwestern politeness" or "Midwest nice": a cultural tendency toward deference, conflict avoidance, and reluctance to impose on others. Grace Perry connected the expression to a wider set of Midwestern social behaviors, writing that "our hesitation to take up space paradoxically takes up more space" and arguing that ope represents "an interruption in the most discreet way possible."

Sneller's research has found that while people of all ages across Michigan use ope, it is more commonly used by white English speakers than by other demographic groups. African-American Vernacular English speakers tend to use "oop" in place of ope.

=== Not exclusively Midwestern ===
Despite its strong Midwestern associations, several linguists have cautioned against treating ope as exclusively regional. Barrett noted self-reports of the sound being used across the United States, Canada, and the United Kingdom, and cited a 2015 BuzzFeed UK video titled "The noise that all Brits make in awkward situations" as evidence of wider usage; the video received nearly 2 million views on YouTube. HuffPost noted in 2017 that Reddit users across the world claimed to make the noise, and that the television show Family Guy had built a joke around the character Stewie repeatedly saying "ope" when almost colliding with Brian.

== Media and internet culture ==
=== Internet memes ===
Ope became an internet meme beginning around 2017–2018, as part of a broader wave of online humor celebrating Midwestern cultural identity. The Twitter account "Midwest vs Everybody" produced one of the earliest viral ope-related posts in June 2018, a poll pitting "ope" against "oops" that received approximately 33,500 retweets. The account grew to over 283,000 followers, including Chasten Buttigieg. The word subsequently proliferated across TikTok.

Comedian Charlie Berens, creator of the YouTube series Manitowoc Minute and author of the New York Times bestselling book The Midwest Survival Guide (2021), helped popularize ope through his comedic sketches celebrating Midwestern culture.

=== 2024 U.S. presidential election ===
Ope received heightened national attention during the 2024 U.S. presidential election after Tim Walz, then the Governor of Minnesota and the Democratic vice-presidential nominee, used the word during a campaign rally in Eau Claire, Wisconsin on August 6, 2024. Mid-speech, Walz noticed an audience member in apparent distress and paused: "Ope. Can we get somebody to help? Somebody's hot." The moment was widely shared on social media and cited in news coverage as an expression of Walz's Midwestern background. The incident generated further meme activity and media commentary connecting ope to Walz's broader image as a "Midwest dad" figure.

== See also ==
- Uff da – a Scandinavian-American exclamation associated with the Upper Midwest
- Opa (expression) – an expression used in various cultures
