= OPA Co., Ltd. =

Japanese retail chain

OPA Co., Ltd. 株式会社OPA
- Type: private kabushiki gaisha
- Industry: retail
- Founded: Kobe, Japan (March 1, 1988, oriental park avenue
- Headquarters: Toyo 20 2-Chome 5F, Koto-ku, Tokyo
- Area served: Japan
- Key people: Tadahiko Yamashita (president)
- Products: clothing
- Revenue: ¥ 14,069 million (February 2010)
- Operating income: ¥ 1,422 million (February 2010)
- Net income: ¥ 220 million (February 2010)
- Total assets: ¥ 22,569 million (February 2010)
- Total equity: ¥ 10,628 million (February 2010)
- Owner: Daiei (100%)
- Subsidiaries: Canal City (株式会社キャナルシティ) (80%)
- Website: www.opa.gr.jp

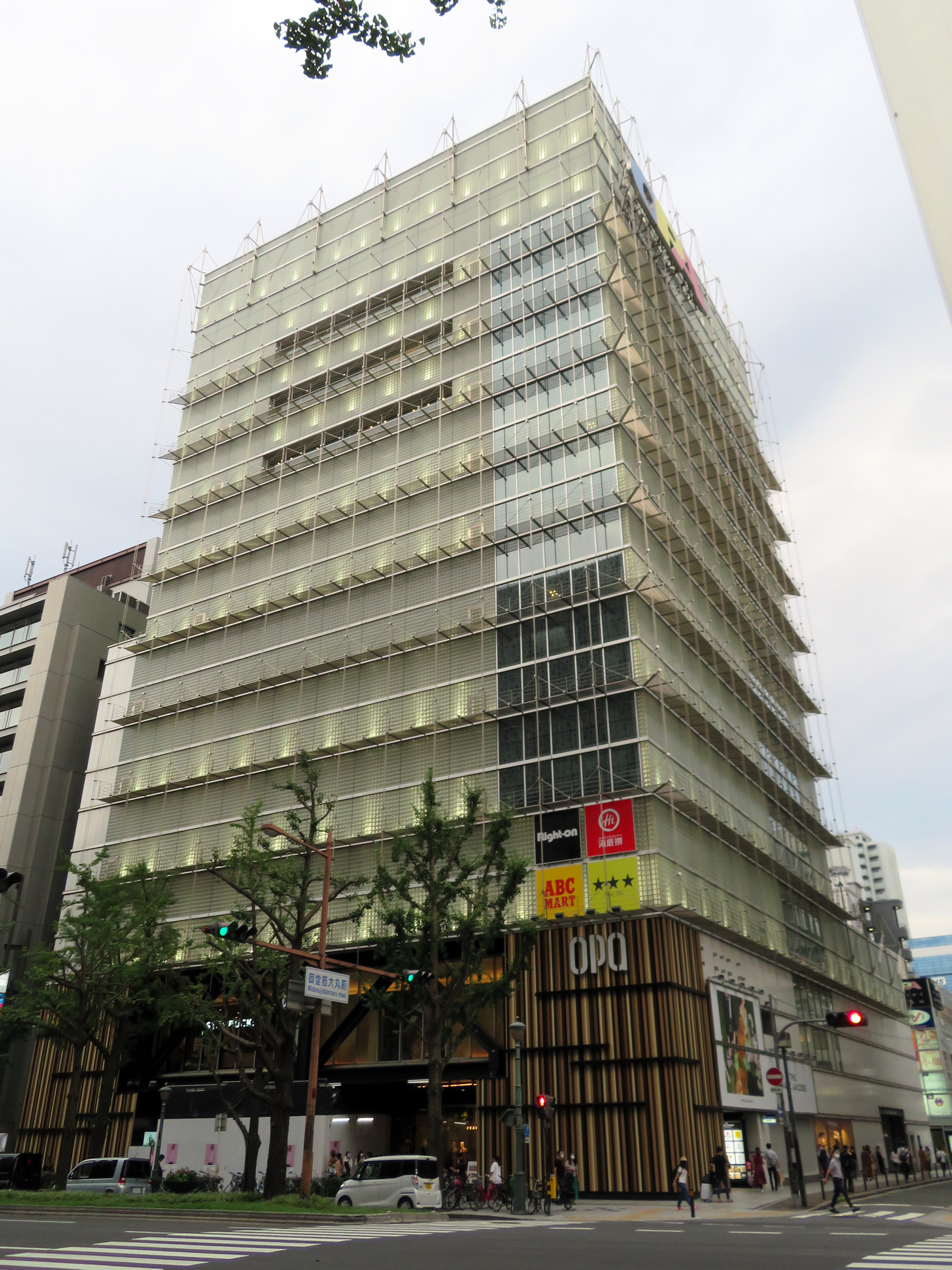
OPA Store in Shinsaibashi, Osaka

OPA Co., Ltd. (株式会社OPA, Kabushiki-gaisha OPA) is a Japanese clothing retail chain and a wholly owned subsidiary of Daiei. It operates clothing and fashion malls across Japan and recently opened a store in Shanghai.

== History ==
Daiei's subsidiary Agora Daiei Co., Ltd. opened the 'Oriental Park Avenue' store in September 1988 in front of the Sanyo Shinkansen Shin-Kobe Station. This store formed the root of OPA. Shin-Kobe Oriental Park Avenue was also converted to an OPA store after the current OPA group was created in 2002. Shin-Kobe Oriental Avenue and the current OPA are not related.

Until September 1999 up to 13 OPA stores were opened all over Japan.

In January 2007, OPA became a direct wholly owned subsidiary of retail giant Daiei through a merger with Jujiya Co., Ltd.

At the end of 2006, a transaction with the Tokyu Land corporation was made.

== Canal City Hakata ==
OPA Co. Ltd.'s 80%-owned subsidiary Canal City Hakata is a shopping complex comprising a variety of business and leisure facilities including a shopping mall, a movie theater, amusement facilities, two hotels, showrooms and corporate offices. There are about 250 shops in the Canal City, dealing with a variety of goods ranging from trendy fashion outfits and cosmetics to sundry items and souvenirs made in Japan and abroad. A canal runs through the middle of the site among the rounded shape and colorful buildings which make up a small town and the dynamic fountain shows announce the time every thirty minutes. On the stage set up beside the canal, various performances and music shows are held almost every day. Canal City resides in the middle between Tenjin area, the largest commercial district in Kyushu, and a business area around JR Hakata Station. It adjoins the Nakasu area, which is well known as an entertainment district.

== OPA stores ==
- Opa Omiya – Saitama Omiya-ku,
- Seiseki Sakuragaoka – Opa Tama
- New Yurigaoka – Opa Kawasaki Aso district
- Opa Fujisawa Fujisawa
- Opa Kawaramachi, Kyoto, Chukyo-ku
- Shinsaibashi – Opa Osaka City Chuo-ku
- Chuo-ku, Osaka Museum – beautiful Opa Shinsaibashi
- Opa Sannomiya – Kobe, Chuo-ku,
- Opa Okayama City, Okayama, Kita-ku
- Opa Canal City, Fukuoka, Hakata-ku, (stores of affiliated companies)
- Opa Naha Naha (sales contracted stores)
- Shanghai Huaihai OPA China Shanghai (opening December 20, 2010)

== Former store locations ==
- Sea Hawk Opa Fukuoka Chuo-ku,
- Opa Takamatsu Takamatsu – town shopping district, Joban
- Opa Sannomiya (Now Kobe Printemps)
- Hamaotsu Opa (closed in March 2004)
- Minamikoshigaya Opa (closed on January 31, 2010)

== Other stores operated by OPA Co., Ltd. ==
- Station Park: Suwa, Nishinohama, Muko City
- HIP IN: Minamikoshigaya, Fujisawa (store-in-store at OPA)
- Shoppers PLAZA : Shin-Urayasu, Yokosuka, Ebina
- Others: Utsunomiya Bell Mall, Nishikawaguchi Fest

== TV commercials ==
- OPA Shinsaibashi TV commercial (1995)
- OPA TV commercial, opening of Hamaōtsu store (1998)
- OPA TV commercial 'rocket shopping' (1999)
- OPA TV commercial 'Oh! Bargain' (2012)
- OPA TV commercial 'OOOOOOOOOOPA' (2012)

== See also ==
- Daiei
- Marubeni
- Marui
