= Henley Park Hotel =

Hotel in Washington, D.C., United States

Coordinates: 38.903°N 77.0254°W

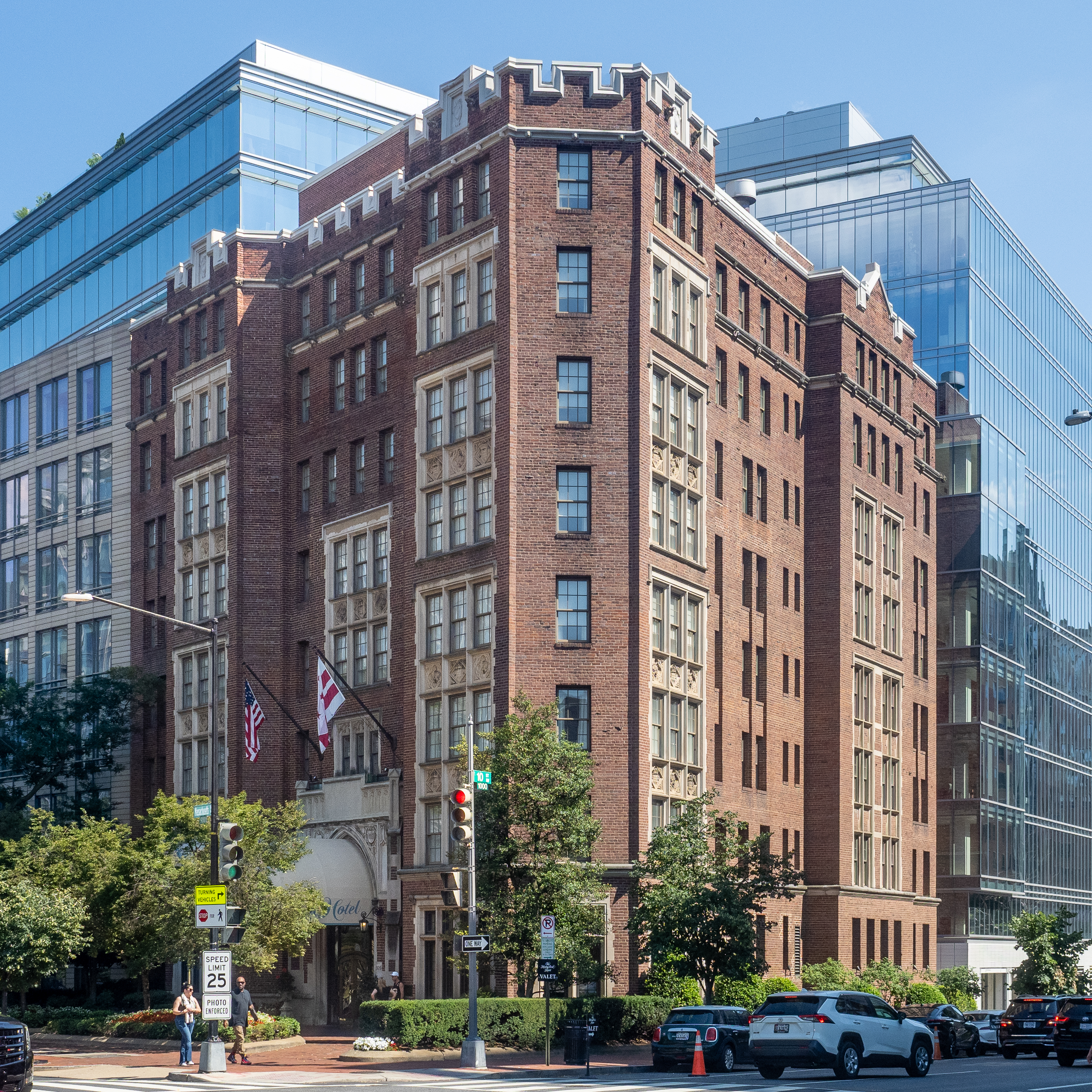
(2024)

The Henley Park Hotel is a 96-room boutique style hotel located on 10th street and Massachusetts Avenue NW in Washington, DC. It features an upscale restaurant, The Tavern, and is noted for its unique architecture. The Henley Park Hotel is a member of Historic Hotels of America, the official program of the National Trust for Historic Preservation.

== Origins ==
Built in 1918 as the Tudor Hall Apartments, it featured many Senators and Congressmen as residents. Built during World War One, it boasted a Gothic style with 119 gargoyles adorning the exterior of the building (all of which still exist today.) In 1982 it was purchased by RB Properties and converted into a boutique hotel featuring all the original architecture.
