= OPA mixture =

Mixture of isopropyl alcohol and isopropylamine

OPA is a mixture of isopropyl alcohol and isopropylamine (72:28) that is used in the production of the sarin nerve agent. The mixture reacts with methylphosphonyl difluoride to produce sarin.
