= Aubrey B. Hamilton =

American politician (1916–1972)

Member of the Missouri Legislature from the St. Louis 5th District district
- In office 1943–1944

Personal details
- Born: Aubrey Bertrand Hamilton Jr. June 9, 1915 Missouri, US
- Died: March 10, 1972 (aged 56) St. Louis, Missouri, US
- Resting place: Valhalla Cemetery
- Party: Republican
- Education: Washington University School of Law
- Profession: Attorney

Aubrey Bertrand Hamilton Jr. (June 9, 1915 – March 10, 1972) was an American politician and attorney. A member of the Republican party, he served in the Missouri House of Representatives for the St. Louis 5th District from 1943 to 1944. He was also a national president of Toastmasters International and Alpha Phi Omega.

== Early life ==
Hamilton won born on June 9, 1915, in Missouri. His parents were Fredericka and Aubrey B. Hamilton. The family lived with his paternal grandmother, Mary E Hamilton, in St. Louis, Missouri, as early as 1920. His mother died in January 1930, followed by his father in November 1938.

In January 1933, Hamilton graduated from Beaumont High School in St. Louis. He then attended Washington University in St. Louis, where he was a member of Alpha Phi Omega. Hamilton was a graduate of Washington University School of Law. He passed The Missouri Bar in September 1939.

== Career ==
Hamilton established a law practice in St. Louis, Missouri. He was a member of Hamilton & Armstrong law firm at the time of his death. He was chair of the Grievance Committee and served on the Lawyer's Reference Committee of the St. Louis Bar Association.

Hamilton was elected to the Missouri House of Representatives for the St. Louis 5th District in 1942. He served one term, from 1943 to 1944. He was a Republican. While in the legislature, he served on the Legislative Committee of the Missouri Municipal League and the Legislative Legal Research Committee. He unsuccessfully ran for reelection in 1944.

Starting in 1945, Hamilton was an associate city counselor in St. Louis, a position he kept until he died. In August 1960, he was admitted to the Bar of the Supreme Court of the United States.

== Honors ==
Hamilton received a citation and bronze medallion from Bishop George L. Cadigan of the Episcopal Diocese of Missouri in 1966. In 1972, Hamilton received the National Distinguished Alumni Award from Alpha Phi Omega.

== Personal life ==
Hamilton married Rosemary B. Crocker of St. Louis in 1941. They had four daughters: Mary Ellen Hamilton, Jean Constance Hamilton, Nancy Elizabeth Hamilton, and Joyce Ann Hamilton. They lived at 6105 Lindell Boulevard in St. Louis.

Hamilton was the founder of the St. Louis chapter of Toastmasters International. He was the national secretary, second vice president, first vice president, and president of Toastmasters International; in this capacity, he traveled across the United States and abroad to visit chapters. He was also the national president of Alpha Phi Omega passing away during his secon term. having served previously as national vice president and national legal counsel. Hamilton was chairman of the St. Louis Department of Welfare's Children's Services Advisory Board, from 1961 until he died. He was also vice president of the Child Welfare League of America. He was a member of the vestry of St. Mark Episcopal Church in St. Louis and was a volunteer with the Boy Scouts of America.

Hamilton died on March 10, 1972, at Barnes Hospital at the age of 56. He was buried in Valhalla Cemetery in Midland, Missouri.
