= Opa (expression) =

Emotional expression in various cultures

Opa exclaimed by a waiter in a Greek restaurant in Chicago while lighting saganaki on fire

Opa (Greek: όπα or ώπα, Cyrillic: опа, Hebrew: הופה, Hungarian: hoppá), also spelled as hopa in some languages, is a common Mediterranean, Eastern European, Middle Eastern, North African, South Asian, and Latin American emotional expression. It is frequently used during celebrations such as weddings or traditional dancing. In Greek culture, the expression sometimes accompanies the act of plate smashing. It can also be used to express enthusiasm, shock or surprise, or just after having made a mistake.

Besides Greece, opa is also used in many other European nations such as Italy, Spain, Portugal, Andorra, Cyprus, Malta, Turkey, Bulgaria, Belarus, Hungary, Ukraine, Montenegro, Romania, Russia, Slovakia, Poland, Albania, Serbia, Croatia, Bosnia and Herzegovina, North Macedonia, Kosovo, Moldova, Armenia, and Georgia, as well as in Middle Eastern nations like Kurdistan, Assyria, Syria, Lebanon, Iraq, Iran, Afghanistan, Jordan, Israel, Palestine, Oman, Yemen, Saudi Arabia, the United Arab Emirates; Central Asian countries like Azerbaijan, Turkmenistan, and Tajikistan; North African nations like Algeria, Egypt, Libya, Morocco, Tunisia, Sudan, and the Sahrawi Republic; and South Asian nations like Pakistan, India, Bangladesh, Sri Lanka, and Nepal as an expression of shock and surprise, or in their traditional folk dances.

In Jewish culture, it is pronounced as "hopa" (Hebrew: הופה) and it is used for mazel tov. Arabs sometimes pronounce it as "obah" (in Arabic, due to the absence of the letter "p" in classical Arabic), and especially use the expression when picking up or playing with children.

Opa also appears in Lusophone Brazil and Cape Verde. A less common variation is epa. This last variation is common in Argentina, specially when someone, more often a child, slips or falls. In Hispanophone Mexico, Peru, and Venezuela, opa is used to warn someone of an unnoticed danger. Besides being used as an emotional expression, opa (or epa) can also be used as a way of getting someone's attention (similar to "Hey!" in English). In Romanian (hopa) and Russian culture (опа) it is used during the short phase of concentration on an action (similar to "come on" in English), the expectation of successful process during the action and the subsequent completion of it, for example, when throwing a basketball into the basket, getting off the bike, or picking up a child.

The equivalent Kalmyk expression is khädris (Oirat: хәдрис), a shortened form of khädris avad od (Oirat: хәдрис авад од, [xæˈdris ˌavadˈot]), literally meaning "come and take it".

== See also ==
- Ope, a Midwestern American onomatopoeia with variable meanings, including "excuse me" or "I'm sorry"
- Wepa, a Puerto Rican expression typically used at parties, dances, or general hype events to express of joy or excitement, hence the direct translation "That's awesome!"
