= Gamma Sigma Sigma =

American collegiate service sorority

- ΓΣΣ
- Founded: October 12, 1952; 74 years ago Beekman Tower, New York City, New York
- Type: Service
- Affiliation: Independent
- Status: Active
- Scope: National
- Colors: Maroon and White
- Symbol: Shepherd's Crook, Omicron
- Flower: White Rose
- Jewel: Garnets and Pearls
- Publication: Perspectives
- Chapters: 53 collegiate, 18 alumni
- Headquarters: PO Box 248; Rindge, New Hampshire 03461; United States
- Website: www.gammasigmasigma.org

Gamma Sigma Sigma (ΓΣΣ) is a national service sorority founded on October 12, 1952, at Beekman Tower in New York City. It partners with charitable organizations such as March of Dimes, American Foundation for Suicide Prevention, American Cancer Society, and Alex's Lemonade Stand Foundation. It has 53 active collegiate chapters and 18 active alumni chapters.

== History ==
The weekend of October 10–12, 1952, student representatives of existing local sororities from eight colleges met at Beekman Tower in New York City. Those organizations and their institution are as follows:

| Original group name | Institution | ΓΣΣ chapter | References |
|---|---|---|---|
| Alpha Gamma Chi | University of Houston | Alpha | |
| Booster Squad | Brooklyn College | Beta | |
| Alpha Gamma Chi | Los Angeles City College | Gamma | |
| Women's Service Organization | New York University | Delta | |
| Omega Service Sorority | Boston University | Epsilon | |
| Gamma Sigma Sigma | Drexel University | Zeta | |
| Sigma Lambda Phi | University of Miami | | |
| Phi Gamma | Queens College | Theta | |

They decided on the name Gamma Sigma Sigma and the colors of maroon and white, and charters were then given to these groups. Sigma Lambda Phi from the University of Miami did not attend the final day of the convention and did not commit to membership at the founding meeting. As a result, they are not considered a founding group of Gamma Sigma Sigma.

== Symbols ==
The colors of Gamma Sigma Sigma are maroon and white. Its symbols are the shepherd's crook and the omicron symbol. Its flower is the white rose. Its jewels are garnet and pearl.

The sorority's publication is Perspectives.

== Activities ==
Collegiate and alumni chapters are required to perform a defined number of service hours during the year as defined in their bylaws. Chapters/individuals may receive awards for their service or for participating in special emphasis projects.

All members are encouraged to participate in the nationally designated service areas, known as project I.M.P.A.C.T. (Individuals Making Progress Across Communities Together). The current I.M.P.A.C.T. areas are Heart Health and Teen & Young Adult Mental Health Awareness. The sorority partners with other charitable organizations, with the longest-standing partnership held by the March of Dimes. Other partners include: American Foundation for Suicide Prevention, American Cancer Society, and Alex's Lemonade Stand Foundation.

== Governance ==
Collegiate chapters are led by an executive board with the following roles. President, Service Vice President, Membership Vice President, Treasurer, Recording Secretary, Corresponding Secretary, Financial Secretary, Public Relations Coordinator, National Representative, and Alumni Liaison. All are elected by the chapter except for the Parliamentarian, who the President appoints.

The sorority's national governing body is the National Convention, held biennially in odd-numbered years. During each convention, the delegation elects the National Board of Directors, which coordinates the sorority's activities. The delegation also chooses two service project areas for emphasis during the next two years.

== Membership ==
Gamma Sigma Sigma is not selective. The sorority does not discriminate based on race, sex, or gender nor do they tolerate hazing in any form. Membership is determined by guidelines set by each chapter, within guidelines set by the national organization and academic institution. These tasks are in direct relationship to both chapter and national service programs. Members-in-training are not required to perform personal services for members, or any activity that can be construed as hazing. Gamma Sigma Sigma also accepts individuals who are members of other organizations, including social sororities, as members.

== Chapters ==
As of February 18, 2023, Gamma Sigma Sigma has 38 active undergraduate chapters and 3 rechartering chapters. It has 42 Active Alumni chapters and colonies.

== Notable members ==
- Pat Nixon (Gamma Alpha, honorary), First Lady of the United States
- Jessye Norman (Alpha Eta), opera singer

=== National honorary members ===
- Barbara Bush (1987), First Lady of the United States
- Beatrice Gaddy (2001), founder of Bea Gaddy's Family Center
- Mae Jemison, the first African-American woman to travel to space
- P. Buckley Moss (1991), artist
- Pat Mitchell (1993), journalists, "Auntie Litter"
- Carrie Newcomer (2015), singer
- Karolyn Nunnallee (1999), president of MADD
- Patricia Wetterling (1997), founder of the Jacob Wetterling Foundation

== Controversies ==
On February 2, 2021, a post on Twitter detailed a series of racist, nationalist blog posts made by a member of the University of Georgia's (UGA) chapter of Gamma Sigma Sigma. One offending post stated the enslavement of Black people in the United States “does not begin to compare to” Sept. 11, 2001. Another post stated that Black people should not get their holiday celebrating independence because “July 4th is about America. Not about race. Without America, the slaves would still be under British control and who knows how long slavery would’ve lasted.” Other members of the chapter were outraged by the posts and demanded that the offending member be removed from her executive leadership position in the chapter.

The issue was brought up in a February 9 chapter meeting attended by members of the sorority's national board. The national board members' efforts to impair the recall of the offending member along with the discovery that the national board had been informed about the hurtful posts months prior and had ignored them increased discontent within the UGA chapter.

In the month directly after the chapter meeting, the majority of the UGA chapter's members and all but one member of the executive board resigned. A new organization has since been created on UGA's campus focused on the same ideals of Gamma Sigma Sigma while also emphasizing inclusive practices.
