= Omega Phi Alpha =

American national service sorority

- ΩΦΑ
- Founded: June 15, 1967; 59 years ago Bowling Green State University
- Type: Service
- Affiliation: Independent
- Status: Active
- Scope: National
- Motto: "Today's Friends, Tomorrow's Leaders, Forever in Service"
- Pillars: Service, Tradition, Sisterhood, Diversity and Inclusion, Leadership, Education
- Colors: Dark Blue, Light Blue, Gold
- Symbol: Chevron, Bee
- Flower: Yellow Rose
- Mascot: Ophia (Raggedy Ann)
- Publication: The Chevron
- Chapters: 30 active
- Nickname: OPA and O Phi A
- Headquarters: PO Box 955; East Lyme, Connecticut 06333; United States
- Website: www.omegaphialpha.org

Omega Phi Alpha National Service Sorority (ΩΦΑ) is an American national service sorority. It was founded in 1967 at Bowling Green State University in Bowling Green, Ohio. Omega Phi Alpha has thirty active chapters.

== History ==
In 1953, several female students at Bowling Green State University expressed an interest in having an organization like the national service fraternity Alpha Phi Omega, which was active on their campus. The brothers of the Zeta Kappa chapter of Alpha Phi Omega changed their plans to form a second fraternity and instead helped establish a new service sorority at Bowling Green State University. They were assisted by Jacqueline E. Timm, a professor of political science at the university who later served as the sorority's honorary advisor.

The two groups were to be alike in objectives—friendship, leadership, and service. A similar name—Omega Phi Alpha—was chosen for the sorority. Just as the Alpha Phi Omega chapter was limited to former Boy Scouts, the Omega Phi Alpha sorority was originally limited to former Girl Scouts and Campfire Girls. The sorority removed this limitation in 1958.

The sisters helped establish two more Omega Phi Alpha chapters at Eastern Michigan University in 1958 and the University of Bridgeport in 1962. However, these chapters operated independently and were not incorporated as a national sorority. In early 1966, the Bowling Green sorority received a letter indicating that the other two had merged to create a national sorority and invited them to join. However, the new national group had not registered legally. Upon learning this, Omega Phi Alpha at Bowling Green registered and invited the two groups to affiliate with it.

The three groups met at a national convention in Bowling Green, Ohio in 1967. On June 15, 1967, the groups agreed to consolidate as a national sorority and laid the foundations for what is currently Omega Phi Alpha. They also decided that Bowling Green was the Alpha chapter. The University of Bridgeport became the Beta chapter, and Eastern Michigan was named the Gamma chapter.

In 1969, the sorority raised money in support of the 1969 Mental Health Campaign. It also collaborated with Alpha Phi Omega on blood drives for the American Red Cross and to raise money for the American Cancer Society. Chapters also volunteered with the Girls Scouts, such as helping a Brownie troop plant trees at a local park.

The Alpha, Beta, and Gamma chapters were the only chapters until the Delta was formed at Texas A&M University in 1970. The chapter participated in eleven service projects during its first school year. Other chapters were added through the Alpha Psi chapter at the University of Pittsburgh in 2025. Omega Phi Alpha has twelve districts of active chapters. Each district is encouraged to meet once a year and is required to hold a district summit in the convention off-year, which includes service projects, workshops, and sisterhood activities.

Its national headquarters is in East Lyme, Connecticut.

== Symbols ==
The motto of Omega Phi Alpha is "Today's Friends, Tomorrow's Leaders, Forever in Service." Its cardinal principles or pillars are Service, Tradition, Sisterhood, Diversity and Inclusion, Leadership, and Education.

Omega Phi Alpha has two badges: one for active members and the other for alumnae. The active badge is a diamond with concave sides. The alumnae badge is round and features a rose; on top of the circle is a chevron with the sorority's name. Its circle represents an alumna's commitment, with no beginning or end. Its chevron symbolizes the ties that bind the organization's members; it points upward because the sky is the limit for Omega Pi Alpha alumnae.

The sorority's colors are dark blue, gold, and light blue. Dark blue symbolizes service, gold is for leadership, and light blue is for friendship. The chevron and the bee are Omega Phi Alpha's symbols. Its flower is the yellow rose, chosen to represent friendship. Its mascot is Ophia (Raggedy Ann).

Omega Phi Alpha's print, now electronic, publication is Chevron. Its nicknames are "OPA" and "O Phi A".

== Activities ==
The purpose of Omega Phi Alpha is as follows:

The purpose and goals of this sorority shall be to assemble its members in the fellowship of Omega Phi Alpha, to develop friendship, leadership, and cooperation by promoting service to the university community, to the community at large, to the members of the sorority, and to the nations of the world.

Omega Phi Alpha has six areas of focus for its community service projects.

1. Mental health
2. President's Project: Each year at the Omega Phi Alpha National Convention, the national president of Omega Phi Alpha presents the cause she feels is worthy of being the focus of OPA service nationwide. Past president's projects prior to 2002 include the environment, terminal illness, AIDS awareness and education, domestic violence, Just Say No, children with disabilities, nursing, ecology, heart disease, children, the elderly, head injury prevention, literacy, and internal organization key points.
3. University community: Sisters provide service within their university's community by volunteering at school events, holding stress relief classes, and performing random acts of kindness.
4. Community at large: Sisters help the community at large by participating in local park clean-ups, food banks, tutoring at a local school, volunteering at the Humane Society, and other local organizations
5. Members of the sorority: Sisters provide service to the members of the sorority by supporting alumnae and internal strengthening.
6. Nations of the world: To serve the nations of the world, sisters have raised funds for UNICEF, AIDS Awareness, diabetes awareness (American Diabetes Association), breast cancer awareness (Susan G. Komen Breast Cancer Foundation, among others).

== Governance ==
Omega Phi Alpha holds a national convention every other year. There, its national executive board is elected, including its president, vice president of business operations, executive secretary, vice president of communications, vice president of alumnae relations, vice president of leadership, vice president of expansions, vice president of advancement, membership director, and vice president of finance. The sorority's national board includes the executive board, its immediate past president, and the college chapter presidents.

== Chapters ==
Following is a list of Omega Phi Alpha collegiate chapters, with active chapters in bold and inactive chapters in italics.

Name	Charter date and range	Institution	City	Status	Ref.
**Alpha**	June 15, 1967	Bowling Green State University	Bowling Green, Ohio	Active	(Note: Chapter was formed from Omega Phi Alpha (local), established on June 15, 1953.)
Beta	June 15, 1967 – 2000	University of Bridgeport	Bridgeport, Connecticut	Inactive	(Note: Chapter formed from Omega Phi Alpha (local), established in 1962.)
**Gamma**	June 15, 1967 – 1974 ?; January 17, 1993	Eastern Michigan University	Ypsilanti, Michigan	Active	(Note: Chapter formed from Omega Phi Alpha (local), established in 1959.)
**Delta**	1970	Texas A&M University	College Station, Texas	Active	
**Epsilon**	May 24, 1973	Tennessee Tech	Cookeville, Tennessee	Active	
Zeta	October 6, 1974 – 1992	Wayland Baptist University	Plainview, Texas	Inactive	
Eta	1974–1983	Amarillo College	Amarillo, Texas	Inactive	
Theta	1975–1978	West Virginia Institute of Technology	Montgomery, West Virginia	Inactive	
Iota	1978–1983	Western Michigan University	Kalamazoo, Michigan	Inactive	
Kappa	1978–1995	Capital University	Columbus, Ohio	Inactive	
Lambda	1981–1988	University of Connecticut	Storrs, Connecticut	Inactive	
Mu	January 29, 1983 – September 23, 2023	Middle Tennessee State University	Murfreesboro, Tennessee	Inactive	
**Nu**	April 23, 1988	Georgia Tech	Atlanta, Georgia	Active	
Xi	1990–1996	University of North Alabama	Florence, Alabama	Inactive	(Note: The chapter is in the 1996 Diorama yearbook, but not 1997.)
**Omicron**	April 4, 1992 – September 29, 2022; October 22, 2022	Auburn University	Auburn, Alabama	Active	
Pi	1994–2000	Post University	Waterbury, Connecticut	Inactive	
**Rho**	December 4, 1993	Western Kentucky University	Bowling Green, Kentucky	Active	
Sigma	December 5, 1993 – 2021	University of Tennessee at Chattanooga	Chattanooga, Tennessee	Inactive	
Tau	April 30, 1994 – 2023	University of Texas at Austin	Austin, Texas	Inactive	
Upsilon	April 19, 1997 – 2019	University of Louisiana	Lafayette, Louisiana	Inactive	
**Phi**	March 28, 1998	Arizona State University	Tempe, Arizona	Active	
**Chi**	April 19, 1998	University of South Carolina	Columbia, South Carolina	Active	
Psi	May 2, 1998 – 2017	Texas A&M University–Corpus Christi	Corpus Christi, Texas	Inactive	
**Omega**	2000–July 19, 2002; February 28, 2015	Rutgers University	New Brunswick, New Jersey	Active	
**Alpha Alpha**	April 29, 2000	Northern Arizona University	Flagstaff, Arizona	Active	
Alpha Beta	January 25, 2003 – 2020	University of Mississippi	Oxford, Mississippi	Inactive	
**Alpha Gamma**	January 17, 2004	Oklahoma State University	Stillwater, Oklahoma	Active	
**Alpha Delta**	April 8, 2006	Georgia Southern University	Statesboro, Georgia	Active	
Alpha Epsilon	June 11, 2006 – 2017	Southeastern Louisiana University	Hammond, Louisiana	Inactive	
**Alpha Zeta**	October 15, 2006	Kennesaw State University	Kennesaw, Georgia	Active	
Alpha Eta	March 3, 2009 – 2015	University of South Carolina Aiken	Aiken, South Carolina	Inactive	
**Alpha Theta**	May 6, 2006	Pennsylvania State University	University Park, Pennsylvania	Active	(Note: Alpha Theta chapter's name was granted slightly out of order to honor the name of the local from which it originated, Theta Alpha Pi.)
**Alpha Iota**	May 16, 2009	Notre Dame of Maryland University	Baltimore, Maryland	Active	
**Alpha Kappa**	February 27, 2010	University of Kansas	Lawrence, Kansas	Active	
**Alpha Lambda**	April 10, 2010	North Carolina State University	Raleigh, North Carolina	Active	
**Alpha Mu**	September 10, 2011	Boston University	Boston, Massachusetts	Active	
**Alpha Nu**	January 19, 2013	Texas State University	San Marcos, Texas	Active	
**Alpha Xi**	March 15, 2014	University of Central Florida	Orlando, Florida	Active	
**Alpha Omicron**	October 25, 2014	University of Florida	Gainesville, Florida	Active	
**Alpha Pi**	November 15, 2014	West Virginia University	Morgantown, West Virginia	Active	
**Alpha Rho**	March 25, 2017	Virginia Tech	Blacksburg, Virginia	Active	
**Alpha Sigma**	April 18, 2021	Old Dominion University	Norfolk, Virginia	Inactive	
**Alpha Tau**	November 5, 2022	University of North Carolina at Chapel Hill	Chapel Hill, North Carolina	Active	
**Alpha Upsilon**	December 3, 2022	University of Tennessee, Knoxville	Knoxville, Tennessee	Active	
**Alpha Phi**	April 29, 2023	Binghamton University	Binghamton, New York	Active	
**Alpha Chi**	October 14, 2023	Marshall University	Huntington, West Virginia	Active	
**Alpha Psi**	April 5, 2025	University of Pittsburgh	Pittsburgh, Pennsylvania	Active	

== Alumni groups ==
Omega Phi Alpha created an alumni society program at its 2005 convention. Historically, the sorority also had alumni chapters, but these were all closed around 2002 and were removed from its constitution on July 16, 2022. It now has alumni groups, which are allowed by the sorority's tax exempt status.

Following is a list of Omega Phi Alpha alumni chapters, with active chapters in bold and inactive chapters in italics.

Name	Charter date and range	Area	Location	Status	Ref.
Omega Alpha	xxxx ?–before 2004	Connecticut	Connecticut	Inactive	
Omega Beta	xxxx ?–20xx ?	Michigan	Roseville, Michigan	Inactive	
Omega Gamma	xxxx ?–20xx ?	Greater Atlanta Area	Atlanta, Georgia	Inactive	
Omega Delta	xxxx ?–20xx ?	Greater Nashville	Nashville, Tennessee	Inactive	
Omega Epsilon	xxxx ?–20xx ?	Chattanooga area	Chattanooga, Tennessee	Inactive	
Omega Zeta	xxxx ?–20xx ?	Austin area	Austin, Texas	Inactive	
Omega Eta	xxxx ?–20xx ?	Knoxville	Knoxville, Tennessee	Inactive	
Omega Theta	xxxx ?–20xx ?	Louisiana	Louisiana	Inactive	

== See also ==
- Service fraternities and sororities
