= List of Epsilon Sigma Alpha chapters =

Epsilon Sigma Alpha is an International community and collegiate coeducational service organization. In the following list of chapters, active chapters are indicated in bold and inactive chapters are in italics.

== Collegiate chapters ==
Chapter	Charter date and range	Institution	Location	Status	Ref.
**Phi Alpha**	1988	Ball State University	Muncie, Indiana	Active	
**Delta Psi**	1989	Elon University	Elon, North Carolina	Active	
**Delta Chi**	1991	Our Lady of the Lake University	San Antonio, Texas	Active	
**Alpha Beta**	1992	Illinois State University	Normal, Illinois	Active	
**Sigma Xi**	1994	University of Maine at Machias	Machias, Maine	Active	
Phi Delta	October 17, 2004	University of Southern Indiana	Evansville, Indiana	Inactive ?	
**Psi Theta**		Augustana College	Rock Island, Illinois	Active	
**Delta Chi**		Belmont Abbey College	Belmont, North Carolina	Active	
**Beta Upsilon**		Bradley University	Peoria, Illinois	Active	
**Omega Pi**		East Carolina University	Greenville, North Carolina	Active	
**Delta Lambda**		Eastern Illinois University	Charleston, Illinois	Active	
		Eastern Kentucky University	Richmond, Kentucky	Active	
**Epsilon Lambda**		Florida State University	Tallahassee, Florida	Active	
**Delta Zeta**		George Washington University	Washington, D.C.	Active	
		Indiana State University	Terre Haute, Indiana	Inactive	
**Delta Psi**		James Madison University	Harrisonburg, Virginia	Active	
**Delta Xi**		Kutztown University of Pennsylvania	Kutztown, Pennsylvania	Active	
**Beta Nu**		La Salle University	Philadelphia, Pennsylvania	Active	
**Delta Theta**		Pennsylvania State University	State College, Pennsylvania	Active	
Phi Beta	19xx ?–2010	Purdue University	West Lafayette, Indiana	Inactive	
**Alpha Chi**		Southern Illinois University Edwardsville	Edwardsville, Illinois	Active	
**Delta Chi**		University of Florida	Gainesville, Florida	Active	
**Psi Mu**		University of Pittsburgh	Pittsburgh, Pennsylvania	Active	
**Sigma Phi**		University of South Carolina	Columbia, South Carolina	Active	
**Omega Psi**		University of West Florida	Pensacola, Florida	Active	
**Omega Psi**		Virginia Tech	Blacksburg, Virginia	Active	
**Kappa Omega**		Bishop State Community College	Mobile, Alabama	Active	

== Community-based chapters ==
Following is an incomplete list of Epsilon Sigma Alpha community-based chapters. Active chapters are indicated in bold. Inactive chapters are in italics.

Number	Name	Charter date	Location	State	Status	Ref.
132	**Alpha Beta**	January 8, 1938	Amarillo, Texas	Texas	Active	
	Beta Rho	September 30, 1929	Greeley, Colorado	Colorado	Inactive ?	
	Alpha Zeta	October 1929	Amarillo, Texas	Texas	Inactive ?	
		October 1929	Lubbock, Texas	Texas	Inactive ?	
		October 1929	Plainview, Texas	Texas	Inactive ?	
		October 1929	Hereford, Texas	Texas	Inactive ?	
		October 1929	Canyon, Texas	Texas	Inactive ?	
		October 1929	Dalhart, Texas	Texas	Inactive ?	
		October 1929	Duncan, Oklahoma	Oklahoma	Inactive ?	
	Beta Kappa	November 25, 1929	Holdenville, Oklahoma	Oklahoma	Inactive ?	
	Delta Rho	December 1929	Tulsa, Oklahoma	Oklahoma	Inactive ?	(Note: This was formed a "junior" chapter.)
	Delta Sigma	December 1929	Tulsa, Oklahoma	Oklahoma	Inactive ?	
	Delta Alpha	December 13, 1929	Anadarko, Oklahoma	Oklahoma	Inactive ?	
	Omicron	1930	Salina, Kansas	Kansas	Inactive	
		April 1931	Evansville, Indiana	Indiana	Inactive ?	
		1930s	Hutchinson, Kansas	Kansas	Inactive	
		1930s	Topeka, Kansas	Kansas	Inactive	
	**Iota Kappa**	1930s	Wichita, Kansas	Kansas	Active	
	**Iota Mu**	1930s	Wichita, Kansas	Kansas	Active	
885	**Gamma Omicron**		Manhattan, Kansas	Kansas	Active	
917	**Alpha Tau**	April 14, 1948	Quanah, Texas	Texas	Active	
1094	**Epsilon Eta**	April 30, 1949	Iowa Park, Texas	Texas	Active	
1101	**Delta Delta**		Ulysses, Kansas	Kansas	Active	
1134	**Alpha Beta**		Panama City, Florida	Florida	Active	
1185	**Epsilon Pi**		Burnet, Texas	Texas	Active	
1503	**Theta Alpha**	January 1951	San Angelo, Texas	Texas	Active	
1864	**Delta Omicron**		Santa Anna, Texas	Texas	Active	
1943	**Alpha Nu**			Georgia	Active	
1965	**Zeta Epsilon**		Sinton, Texas	Texas	Active	
2336	**Beta Zeta**			Georgia	Active	
2517	**Gamma Rho**		Fort Myers, Florida	Florida	Active	
2627	**Lambda Alpha**	July 1957	Odessa, Texas	Texas	Active	
2664	**Delta Alpha**		Kissimee, Florida	Florida	Active	
2665	**Lambda Iota**	October 30, 1957	Weslaco, Texas	Texas	Active	
2737	**Kappa Mu**	May 28, 1958	Harlingen, Texas	Texas	Active	
2879	**Mu Alpha**	August 15, 1959	Pasadena, Texas	Texas	Active	
2959	**Epsilon Gamma**		DeLand, Florida	Florida	Active	
3178	**Delta Zeta**	November 1962	Marble Falls, Texas	Texas	Active	
3191	**Beta Xi**	January 1963	Hurst, Texas	Texas	Active	
3205	**Gamma Phi**	1963	San Antonio, Texas	Texas	Active	
3372	**Beta Kappa**			Georgia	Active	
3398	**Alpha Nu**		Merritt Island, Florida	Florida	Active	
3399	**Beta Phi**		Ocala, Florida	Florida	Active	
	**Alpha Sigma**	March 1967		Minnesota	Active	
3624	**Beta Theta**	October 6, 1967	Woodbury, Minnesota	Minnesota	Active	
3908	**Sigma Iota**	1969	Bedford, Texas	Texas	Active	
3440	**Epsilon Lambda**		Cocoa Beach, Florida	Florida	Active	
3447	**Delta Epsilon**	October 1966	Plano, Texas	Texas	Active	
3509	**Gamma Mu**		Lakeland, Florida	Florida	Active	
3513	**Alpha Gamma**		Crystal River, Florida	Florida	Active	
3570	**Gamma Sigma**			Georgia	Active	
4093	**Rho Theta**	May 27, 1971	Irving, Texas	Texas	Active	
4133	**Zeta Tau**	October 1971	Baytown, Texas	Texas	Active	
4238	**Kappa Kappa**	August 31, 1972	San Antonio, Texas	Texas	Active	
4367	**Delta Iota**			Georgia	Active	
4382	**Theta Eta**	March 13, 1974	Richardson, Texas	Texas	Active	
4443	**Sigma Epsilon**	September 1974	Crowley, Texas	Texas	Active	
4629	**Epsilon Iota**	1976	Garland, Texas	Texas	Active	
4801	**Beta Sigma**	May 22, 1979	Crosby, Texas	Texas	Active	
4803	**Beta Theta**		Clermont, Florida	Florida	Active	
4931	**Beta Sigma**			Georgia	Active	
5027	**Theta Tau**		Winter Park, Florida	Florida	Active	
5036	**Beta Lambda**	1981	San Angelo, Texas	Texas	Active	
5083	**Delta Delta**	November 6, 1984	Richardson, Texas	Texas	Active	
5101	**Sigma Tau**		Clearwater, Florida	Florida	Active	
5125	**Kappa Rho**			Georgia	Active	
5214	**Lambda Nu**	April 30, 1988	Kingsland, Texas	Texas	Active	
5263	**Omega Omega**		Largo, Florida	Florida	Active	
5270	**Delta Xi**	1991	Arlington, Texas	Texas	Active	
5284	**Alpha Gamma**	December 16, 1991	Grand Prairie, Texas	Texas	Active	
5351	**Rho Chi**		Wesley Chapel, Florida	Florida	Active	
5358	**Lambda Chi**		Davison, Michigan	Michigan	Active	
5359	**Beta Beta**		Palm Harbor, Florida	Florida	Active	
5382	**Omega Nu**		Matoon, Illinois	Illinois	Active	
5391	**Nu Alpha**		Merritt Island, Florida	Florida	Active	
5398	**Chi Rho**	July 2000	Addison, Texas	Texas	Active	
5444	**Sigma Chi**			Georgia	Active	
5464	**Gamma Omega**			Georgia	Active	
5521	**Alpha Delta**			Georgia	Active	
5544	**Alpha Beta**			Georgia	Active	
5445	**Kappa Beta**	2003	Garland, Texas	Texas	Active	
5459	**Pi Delta**		Garland, Texas	Texas	Active	
5552	**Delta Nu**			Georgia	Active	
5592	**Alpha Omega**	June 2016	Aubrey, Texas	Texas	Active	
5598	Phi Xi		Urbana, Ohio	Ohio		
5600	**Sigma Nu**	October 2017	Leesburg, Texas	Texas	Active	
5603	**Zeta Omicron**	May 20, 2018	Houston, Texas	Texas	Active	
5609	**Delta Phi**		Buchanan Dam, Texas	Texas	Active	
5619	**Delta Omega**			Georgia	Active	
	**Iota Nu**	July 22, 2023		Texas	Active	
	**Alpha Alpha**		Fort Smith, Arkansas	Arkansas	Active	
	**Alpha Alpha**		Alexandra, Louisiana	Louisiana	Active	
	**Alpha Alpha**		Bloomington, Illinois	Illinois	Active	
	**Alpha Gamma**		Denver, Colorado	Colorado	Active	
	**Alpha Delta**		Pleasant Township, Indiana	Indiana	Active	
	**Alpha Delta**		Richmond, Virginia	Virginia	Active	
	**Alpha Delta**		Pueblo, Colorado	Colorado	Active	
	**Alpha Delta**		Hopkinsville, Kentucky	Kentucky	Active	
	**Alpha Delta**		Haughton, Louisiana	Louisiana	Active	
	**Alpha Epsilon**		Paducah, Kentucky	Kentucky	Active	
	**Alpha Zeta**		Minneapolis–Saint Paul, Minnesota	Minnesota	Active	
	**Alpha Zeta**		Fort Wayne, Indiana	Indiana	Active	
	**Alpha Theta**		Bowling Green, Kentucky	Kentucky	Active	
	**Alpha Kappa**		Rochester, Michigan	Michigan	Active	
	**Alpha Kappa**		Tempe, Arizona	Arizona	Active	
	**Alpha Lambda**		Okemos, Michigan	Michigan	Active	
	**Alpha Lambda**		Greeley, Colorado	Colorado	Active	
	**Alpha Mu**			Kentucky	Active	
	**Alpha Nu**		e-chapter	Virginia	Active	
	**Alpha Nu**		Wilmington, North Carolina	North Carolina	Active	
	**Alpha Nu**		Phoenix, Arizona	Arizona	Active	
	**Alpha Xi**		El Dorado, Arkansas	Arkansas	Active	
	**Alpha Omicron**		Salida, Colorado	Colorado	Active	
	**Alpha Omicron**		Scottsdale, Arizona	Arizona	Active	
	Alpha Pi		Selma, Alabama	Alabama	Inactive	
	**Alpha Sigma**		Phoenix, Arizona	Arizona	Active	
	**Alpha Upsilon**		Mattoon, Illinois	Illinois	Active	
	**Alpha Phi**		Golden, Colorado	Colorado	Active	
	**Alpha Chi**		Waynesboro, Virginia	Virginia	Active	
	**Alpha Chi**		Sierra Vista, Arizona	Arizona	Active	
	**Alpha Chi**			Minnesota	Active	
	**Alpha Omega**		Winchester, Virginia	Virginia	Active	
	**Alpha Omega**		Malvern, Arkansas	Arkansas	Active	
	**Alpha Omega**		Pueblo, Colorado	Colorado	Active	
	**Alpha Omega**		Lafayette, Louisiana	Louisiana	Active	
	**Beta Alpha**		Pea Ridge, Arkansas	Arkansas	Active	
	**Beta Alpha**		Aurora, Colorado	Colorado	Active	
	**Beta Beta**		Andover, Kansas	Kansas	Active	
	**Beta Gamma**		Mesa, Arizona	Arizona	Active	
	**Beta Gamma**		New Orleans, Louisiana	Louisiana	Active	
	**Beta Delta**		Roanoke, Virginia	Virginia	Active	
	**Beta Delta**		Tucson, Arizona	Arizona	Active	
	**Beta Epsilon**		Fort Morgan, Colorado	Colorado	Active	
	**Beta Epsilon**		Wiliams, Arizona	Arizona	Active	
	**Beta Zeta**		Cañon City, Colorado	Colorado	Active	
	**Beta Zeta**		Quincy, Illinois	Illinois	Active	
	**Beta Kappa**		Seymour, Indiana	Indiana	Active	
	**Beta Kappa**		Virginia Beach, Virginia	Virginia	Active	
	**Beta Kappa**		Tucson, Arizona	Arizona	Active	
	**Beta Kappa**		Moline, Illinois	Illinois	Active	
	**Beta Mu**		Charleston, Illinois	Illinois	Active	
	**Beta Nu**		Pueblo, Colorado	Colorado	Active	
	**Beta Nu**			Kentucky	Active	
	**Beta Omicron**		Staunton, Virginia	Virginia	Active	
	**Beta Omicron**		Rogers, Arkansas	Arkansas	Active	
	**Beta Sigma**		Richmond, Virginia	Virginia	Active	
	**Beta Sigma**		Grand Rapids, Michigan	Michigan	Active	
	**Bet Sigma**			Minnesota	Active	
	**Beta Tau**		Woodbridge, Virginia	Virginia	Active	
	**Beta Upsilon**		Harrison, Arkansas	Arkansas	Active	
	**Beta Chi**		Huntington, Indiana	Indiana	Active	
	**Beta Chi**		Pine Bluff, Arkansas	Arkansas	Active	
	**Beta Phi**		Rockville, Indiana	Indiana	Active	
	**Beta Psi**		Burlington, North Carolina	North Carolina	Active	
	**Beta Psi**			Ohio	Active	
	**Gamma Beta**			Ohio	Active	
	**Gamma Gamma**		Scottsdale, Arizona	Arizona	Active	
	**Gamma Zeta**			Minnesota	Active	
	**Gamma Kappa**		Loveland, Ohio	Ohio	Active	
	**Gamma Pi**		Huntington, Indiana	Indiana	Active	
	**Gamma Pi**		Staunton, Virginia	Virginia	Active	
	**Gamma Sigma**		Madison, North Carolina	North Carolina	Active	
	**Gamma Tau**		Avon, Indiana	Indiana	Active	
	**Gamma Tau**		Henderson, Kentucky	Kentucky	Active	
	**Gamma Chi**		Loveland, Colorado	Colorado	Active	
	**Gamma Psi**		North Little Rock, Arkansas	Arkansas	Active	
	**Gamma Omega**		Akron, Colorado	Colorado	Active	
	**Gamma Omega**		Minneapolis, Minnesota	Minnesota	Active	
	**Delta Gamma**			Ohio	Active	
	**Delta Delta**		Seymour, Indiana	Indiana	Active	
	**Delta Zeta**		Terre Haute, Indiana	Indiana	Active	
	**Delta Theta**		Denver, Colorado	Colorado	Active	
	**Delta Kappa**		Roanoke, Virginia	Virginia	Active	
	**Delta Mu**			Minnesota	Active	
	**Delta Nu**		Vilonia, Arkansas	Arkansas	Active	
	**Delta Pi**		Phoenix, Arizona	Arizona	Active	
	**Delta Rho**		Front Royal, Virginia	Virginia	Active	
	**Delta Rho**		Williamston, Michigan	Michigan	Active	
	**Delta Rho**			Minnesota	Active	
	**Delta Sigma**		Evansville, Indiana	Indiana	Active	
	**Delta Sigma**		Manassas, Virginia	Virginia	Active	
	**Delta Tau**		Louisville, Kentucky	Kentucky	Active	
	**Delta Chi**		Belmont Abbey, North Carolina	North Carolina	Active	
	**Delta Chi**		Akron, Colorado	Colorado	Active	
	**Delta Chi**		Rock Island, Illinois	Illinois	Active	
	**Delta Chi**		Cincinnati, Ohio	Ohio	Active	
	**Epsilon Epsilon**		Denver, Colorado	Colorado	Active	
	**Epsilon Zeta**		Quincy, Illinois	Illinois	Active	
	**Epsilon Sigma**		North Manchester, Indiana	Indiana	Active	
	**Zeta Epsilon**		Overland Park, Kansas	Kansas	Active	
	**Zeta Mu**		Smith Mountain Lake, Virginia	Virginia	Active	
	**Zeta Nu**		Colorado Springs, Colorado	Colorado	Active	
	**Zeta Rho**		Ruston, Louisiana	Louisiana	Active	
	**Zeta Tau**		Davison, Michigan	Michigan	Active	
	**Zeta Tau**		Colorado Springs, Colorado	Colorado	Active	
	**Zeta Chi**		Hot Springs, Arkansas	Arkansas	Active	
	**Zeta Chi**			Kentucky	Active	
	**Eta Gamma**		Henderson, Nevada	Nevada	Active	
	**Eta Pi**		Fishers, Indiana	Indiana	Active	
	**Eta Pi**		Vail, Arizona	Arizona	Active	
	**Theta Epsilon**		Blythville, Arkansas	Arkansas	Active	
	**Theta Eta**		Denver, Colorado	Colorado	Active	
	**Theta Mu**		Richmond, Virginia	Virginia	Active	
	**Theta Rho**			Minnesota	Active	
	**Kappa Iota**		Golden, Colorado	Colorado	Active	
	**Kappa Nu**		Raleigh, North Carolina	North Carolina	Active	
	**Kappa Sigma**		Springdale, Arkansas	Arkansas	Active	
	**Kappa Phi**		Howell, Michigan	Michigan	Active	
	**Kappa Psi**		Louisville, Kentucky	Kentucky	Active	
	**Lambda Mu**		Lafayette, Indiana	Indiana	Active	
	**Lambda Chi**		Brighton, Michigan	Michigan	Active	
	**Xi Chi**		O’Fallon, Illinois	Illinois	Active	
	**Pi Sigma**		Johnstown, Colorado	Colorado	Active	
	**Sigma Rho**		Loveland, Colorado	Colorado	Active	
	**Sigma Tau**		Dearborn, Michigan	Michigan	Active	
	**Sigma Chi**		Roanoke, Virginia	Virginia	Active	
	**Sigma Chi**		Cincinnati, Ohio	Ohio	Active	
	**Tau Delta**		Tallahassee, Florida	Florida	Active	
	**Chi Delta**		Chapel Hill, North Carolina	North Carolina	Active	
	**Chi Kappa**		Denver, Colorado	Colorado	Active	
	**Chi Omicron**		Avon, Indiana	Indiana	Active	
	**Omega Alpha**		Phoenix, Arizona	Arizona	Active	
	**Omega Tau**		Red River, Louisiana	Louisiana	Active	
	**Omega Mu**		Albany, Oregon	Oregon	Active	
	**Omega Mu**		Maricopa, Arizona	Arizona	Active	
	**Omega Nu**		Mattoon, Illinois	Illinois	Active	
	**Omega Sigma**		Cary, North Carolina	North Carolina	Active	
	**Omega Chi**		Plainfield, Indiana	Indiana	Active	
	**Omega Chi**		Florence, Colorado	Colorado	Active	
