= List of Psi Psi Psi chapters =

Psi Psi Psi, also known as Tri Psi, is a North American sorority for the mothers of members of the collegiate sorority Delta Delta Delta. In the following list of chapters, active chapters are indicated in bold and inactive chapters are in italics.

| Chapter | Charter date and range | Location | Status | Ref. |
|---|---|---|---|---|
| **Alpha** | October 2, 1914 | Indianapolis, Indiana | Active | |
| Beta | May 13, 1917 – April 30, 1966 | Greencastle, Indiana | Inactive | |
| Gamma | May 4, 1920 – November 20, 1997 | Franklin, Indiana | Inactive | |
| Delta | June 1, 1925 – February 16, 2013 | Los Angeles, California | Inactive | |
| Epsilon | July 15, 1926 – May 7, 1939 | Manhattan, Kansas | Inactive | |
| Zeta | June 18, 1926 – April 8, 1989 | Portland, Oregon | Inactive | |
| Eta | September 9, 1927 – May 18, 1938 | Waterville, Maine | Inactive | |
| **Theta** | October 8, 1927 | Springfield, Missouri | Active | |
| Iota | November 17, 1927 – October 19, 1999 | Denver, Colorado | Inactive | |
| Kappa | March 5, 1928 – May 3, 1969 | Corvallis, Oregon | Inactive | |
| Lambda | October 21, 1928 – June 4, 1905 | Urbana and Champaign, Illinois | Inactive | |
| **Mu** | May 3, 1929 | Decatur, Illinois | Active | |
| Nu | May 3, 1929 – May 24, 1966 | Galesburg, Illinois | Inactive | |
| Xi | September 18, 1930 – March 30, 1930 | Columbus, Ohio | Inactive | |
| Omicron | January 29, 1931 – December 31, 2015 | Minneapolis, Minnesota | Inactive | |
| Pi | March 28, 1933 – October 13, 1967 | Fort Collins, Colorado | Inactive | |
| Rho | April 12, 1935 – May 30, 1980 | Knoxville, Tennessee | Inactive | |
| Sigma | March 19, 1937 – May 20, 2020 | Baton Rouge, Louisiana | Inactive | |
| Tau | April 28, 1937 – May 10, 1980 | Dayton, Ohio | Inactive | |
| Upsilon | Apr 27, 1939 – April 5, 1989 | Miami, Florida | Inactive | |
| Phi | May 7, 1940 – May 13, 1972 | Laramie, Wyoming | Inactive | |
| Chi | April 3, 1940 – May 28, 1949 | Sioux City, Iowa | Inactive | |
| Psi | May 14, 1942 – January 4, 2017 | Evanston, Illinois | Inactive | |
| Omega | January 12, 1943 – January 1978 | Pittsburgh, Pennsylvania | Inactive | |
| **Canada Alpha** | May 19, 1933 | Toronto, Ontario, Canada | Active | |
| Canada Beta | May 31, 1941 – February 26, 1960 | Edmonton, Alberta, Canada | Inactive | |
| Alpha Alpha | April 6, 1945 – April 21, 2000 | Tulsa, Oklahoma | Inactive | |
| Alpha Beta | October 11, 1945 – January 1978 | Pittsburgh, Pennsylvania | Inactive | |
| Alpha Gamma | September 25, 1947 – 202x ? | Kansas City, Missouri | Inactive | |
| Alpha Delta | November 12, 1948 – May 16, 1966 | Detroit, Michigan | Inactive | |
| Alpha Epsilon | April 14, 1950 – April 26, 1987 | Milwaukee, Wisconsin | Inactive | |
| Alpha Zeta | April 27, 1950 – January 24, 1981 | Athens, Georgia | Inactive | |
| Alpha Eta | November 6, 1950 – April 18, 1970 | Los Angeles, California | Inactive | |
| Alpha Theta | March 31, 1951 – January 1, 1978 | Albuquerque, New Mexico | Inactive | |
| Alpha Iota | June 5, 1951 – 202x ? | St. Louis, Missouri | Active | |
| Alpha Kappa | June 7, 1951 – May 16, 1985 | Cleveland, Ohio | Inactive | |
| Alpha Lambda | October 8, 1951 – May 12, 1963 | Beloit, Wisconsin | Inactive | |
| **Alpha Mu** | January 15, 1952 | Tucson, Arizona | Active | |
| **Alpha Nu** | September 22, 1953 | Wichita, Kansas | Active | |
| Alpha Xi | October 26, 1953 – April 21, 1971 | Lawrence, Kansas | Inactive | |
| **Alpha Omicron** | November 11, 1953 | Cincinnati, Ohio | Active | |
| Alpha Pi | September 21, 1954 – May 7, 1974 | Seattle, Washington | Inactive | |
| Alpha Rho (First) | October 17, 1954 – October 6, 1964 | Tacoma, Washington | Inactive | |
| Alpha Sigma | September 9, 1955 – May 14, 1998 | Fort Worth, Texas | Inactive | |
| Alpha Tau | November 14, 1955 – April 6, 1977 | Spokane, Washington | Inactive | |
| Alpha Upsilon | November 17, 1955 – February 2, 1999 | Arlington, Virginia | Inactive | |
| Alpha Phi | June 6, 1957 – 19xx ? | Fort Lauderdale, Florida | Inactive | |
| Alpha Chi | November 16, 1957 – April 25, 1962 | Duluth, Minnesota | Inactive | |
| Alpha Psi | September 5, 1958 – February 22, 1997 | Dallas, Texas | Inactive | |
| Alpha Omega | March 14, 1959 – January 20, 2021 | Cape Girardeau, Missouri | Inactive | |
| Beta Alpha | March 31, 1959 – April 7, 1962 | Austin, Texas | Inactive | |
| Beta Beta | April 21, 1960 – April 24, 1965 | Belleville, Illinois | Inactive | |
| Beta Gamma | June 22, 1960 – March 4, 1995 | Long Beach, California | Inactive | |
| Beta Delta | May 14, 1963 – June 11, 1963 | Portland, Oregon | Inactive | |
| Beta Epsilon | October 8, 1964 – November 2, 1964 | Abilene, Texas | Inactive | |
| Beta Zeta | April 26, 1965 – October 26, 1970 | College Park, Maryland | Inactive | |
| Beta Eta | October 4, 1965 – April 18, 1969 | New Orleans, Louisiana | Inactive | |
| Beta Theta | June 29, 1967 – February 18, 1971 | Phoenix, Arizona | Inactive | |
| Beta Iota | October 15, 1967 – January 1, 1999 | Northridge, Los Angeles, California | Inactive | |
| Beta Kappa | March 6, 1970 – May 3, 1993 | Shreveport, Louisiana | Inactive | |
| Beta Lambda | April 28, 1971 – April 16, 1973 | Jackson, Mississippi | Inactive | |
| Beta Mu | April 30, 1973 – May 29, 1976 | Midland, Texas | Inactive | |
| Beta Nu | February 7, 1976 – November 5, 1994 | Oklahoma City, Oklahoma | Inactive | |
| Beta Xi | November 8, 1976 – May 9, 1979 | Memphis, Tennessee | Inactive | |
| Beta Omicron | September 15, 1977 – April 16, 1994 | Urbana and Champaign, Illinois | Inactive | |
| Beta Pi | February 22, 1978 – March 3, 1981 | Reno, Nevada | Inactive | |
| Beta Rho | October 12, 1979 – May 15, 1980 | Terre Haute, Indiana | Inactive | |
| Alpha Rho (Second) | February 26, 1981 – September 1, 1981 | Athens, Georgia | Inactive | |
| Beta Sigma | April 11, 1981 – October 1, 1988 | Moscow, Idaho | Inactive | |
| Beta Tau | March 8, 1984 – May 25, 1993 | Clearwater, Florida | Inactive | |
| Beta Upsilon | March 25, 1984 – March 23, 1985 | Normal, Illinois | Inactive | |
| Beta Phi | April 28, 1984 – April 28, 1990 | Hattiesburg, Mississippi | Inactive | |
| Beta Chi | May 29, 1984 – May 29, 1984 | Lafayette, Louisiana | Inactive | |
| Beta Psi | May 5, 1984 – January 1, 2013 | Irvine, California | Inactive | |
| Beta Omega | November 1, 1984 – March 2, 1985 | Davis, California | Inactive | |
| Gamma Alpha | October 11, 1986 – October 15, 1988 | Tempe, Arizona | Inactive | |
| Gamma Beta | April 27, 1987 – March 26, 1990 | Arlington, Texas | Inactive | |
| Gamma Gamma | March 11, 1989 – April 6, 2002 | Jacksonville, Florida | Inactive | |
| Gamma Delta | April 30, 1989 – June 7, 2015 | Santa Barbara, California | Inactive | |
| Gamma Epsilon | January 13, 1991 – February 10, 1991 | Columbus, Ohio | Inactive | |
| Gamma Zeta | March 22, 1997 – February 6, 1999 | Indianola, Iowa | Inactive | |
| Gamma Eta | May 4, 1996 – March 25, 2006 | Terre Haute, Indiana | Inactive | |
| Delta Alpha | April 9, 2011 – May 2, 2011 | Lexington, Kentucky | Inactive | |
| Delta Beta | December 2, 2012 – November 6, 2016 | College Station, Texas | Inactive | |
| Delta Gamma | December 6, 2012 – December 7, 2014 | Northridge, Los Angeles, California | Inactive | |
| Delta Epsilon | November 10, 2013 – January 1, 2016 | Los Angeles, California | Inactive | |
| Delta Pi | May 3, 2014 – Septempter 29, 2018 | Berkeley, California | Inactive | |
| Delta Rho | February 21, 2015 – 20xx ? | Fayetteville, Arkansas | Inactive | |
| Delta Sigma | November 12, 2016 – 202x ? | Columbia, South Carolina | Inactive | |
| Delta Tau | April 7, 2018 – 202x ? | Tallahassee, Florida | Inactive | |
| Delta Phi (First) | May 10, 2014 – 202x ? | Los Angeles, California | Inactive | (Note: The Tri Delta Digital Museum lists this as Delta Phi which appears to be a mistake as there would have been two chapters with that name that were active at the same time. Based on name order, it should be Delta Upsilon.) |
| Delta Phi (Second) | November 19, 2018 – 202x ? | Georgetown, Texas | Inactive | |
| **Delta Chi** | October 17, 2020 | New Orleans, Louisiana | Active | |
| **Delta Psi** | December 29, 2020 | Winter Park, Florida | Active | |
