= Joyce Aboussie =

CEO, Aboussie & Associates

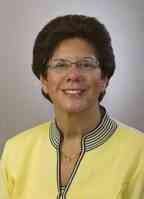
- Joyce Aboussie, CEO Aboussie & Associates
- Occupation: CEO
- Employer(s): Aboussie & Associates, Telephone Contact Inc.
- Board member of: National Board of Directors and Governors of St. Jude Children's Research Hospital; ALSAC/St. Jude Children's Research Hospital Board of Directors and Governors
- Website: www.joyceaboussie.com

Joyce Aboussie (born 1957) is the founder and CEO of Aboussie & Associates, a consulting firm in St. Louis, Missouri. She is also the founder and CEO of Telephone Contact Inc., a consulting, research and data management firm.

== Career ==
Aboussie has a B.A. in political science from Saint Louis University. She was the national vice chair of Congressman Dick Gephardt's 1988 presidential campaign and previously served as his National Political Director. Aboussie served on the national finance boards for the presidential campaigns of Barack Obama, Hillary Clinton and Joe Biden.

In 1983, Aboussie was elected to the National Board of Directors and Governors of St. Jude Children's Research Hospital.

In 2006, the St. Louis Business Journal named Aboussie one of the "Most Influential Business Women." In 1995, she was named by the St. Louis Business Journal as one of "40 people under 40" who make a difference in St. Louis.

Also in 2006, she was elected as the first woman Chairperson of the ALSAC/St. Jude Children's Research Hospital Board of Directors and Governors.

In 2015, Aboussie was inducted under the category of Small Independent Entrepreneurship into the Entrepreneurial Hall of Fame of the Center for Entrepreneurship at Saint Louis University.
