= Gamma Gamma Chi =

American Muslim-interest sorority

- ΓΓΧ
- Founded: April 3, 2005; 21 years ago Greensboro, North Carolina
- Type: Social
- Affiliation: Independent
- Status: Active
- Emphasis: Cultural interest - Islam
- Scope: National
- Motto: "Striving for the Pleasure of Allah through Sisterhood, Scholarship, Leadership, and Community Service"
- Colors: Lavender and Emerald Green
- Flower: Water lily
- Jewel: Amethyst
- Mascot: Bee
- Chapters: 1 active, 7 chartered
- Members: 61+ lifetime
- Headquarters: Greensboro, North Carolina; United States

Gamma Gamma Chi (ΓΓΧ) is an American community-based service sorority that is Islamic based. It was founded in Greensboro, North Carolina in 2005. It was the first Islamic sorority to be established in the United States.

== History ==
Gamma Gamma Chi was founded in Greensboro, North Carolina, on April 3, 2005, by Guilford College student Imani Canty and her mother Althia Ali, former president of Bennett College. The sorority's purpose is to promote a positive image of Muslim women and Islam in general. It was the first Islamic sorority to be established in the United States.

The sorority's National Grand chapter was established on November 13, 2005, in Alexandria, Virginia. Gamma Gamma Chi was incorporated in the Commonwealth of Virginia on July 21, 2005. Initially, the sorority investigated forming chapters at universities. However, it instead formed community-based chapters that invited prospective members from multiple universities and the broader community. By 2010, Gamma Gamma Chi had chartered five chapters.

In July 2012, Gamma Gamma Chi had chartered six chapters and inducted 61 members. The sorority held its first national gathering, GammaFest, in Ellicott City, Maryland, from April 6 to 8, 2007. However, the sorority's membership declined, and Gamma Gamma Chi became defunct in 2015.

A group of members started meeting in November 2023 to reform the sorority. Gamma Gamma Chi was reincorporated in the State of North Carolina in 2025. On February 2, 2025, Chi chapter was established as a national and governing chapter of Gamma Gamma Chi. In April 2025, members met in Charlotte, North Carolina, to celebrate the 20th anniversary of the sorority.

== Symbols ==
The Greek letters Gamma Gamma Chi were selected to represent the Greek words gynaikes (woman), ge (death), and chronon (years or time), from the phrase "Women on earth for a period of time”, which fits with Islamic teachings. Gamma Gamma Chi's motto is "Striving for the Pleasure of Allah through Sisterhood, Scholarship, Leadership, and Community Service". Based on Islam's Five Pillars, the sorority's six gold pillars are Islamic awareness and involvement, educational development, economic development and indigent support, environmental awareness and involvement, physical and mental health, and social awareness and involvement.

The sorority's colors are lavender and emerald green. These were chosen because Lavender symbolizes peace and green was Muhammad's favorite color. Its flower is the water lily, selected because it flourishes in difficult, uninhabitable surroundings. Its jewel is the amethyst. Its mascot is the bee.

The sorority has a special handshake.

== Activities ==
Chapters volunteer and help with fundraising activities for charitable organizations. Members also come together to observe holy days. Because of its members' commitment to Islam, sorority events do not include alcohol or casual socializing with men.

== Membership ==
Membership in Gamma Gamma Chi is open to Muslim women and non-Muslim women who support the sorority's purpose.

== Chapters ==
Following are the chapters of Gamma Gamma Chi, with active chapters indicated in bold and inactive chapters in italics.

| Chapter | Charter date and range | Area served | Location | Status | Ref. |
|---|---|---|---|---|---|
| Alpha | April 23, 2006 – c. 2015 | Metro Atlanta | Atlanta, Georgia | Inactive | (Note: This chapter included American Intercontinental University, Clark Atlanta University, Georgia Perimeter College, Spelman College, and Troy State University.) |
| Beta | July 22, 2006 – c. 2015 | Washington metropolitan area | Silver Spring, Maryland | Inactive | |
| Gamma | April 8, 2007 – c. 2010 | Piedmont Triad | Greensboro, North Carolina | Inactive | |
| Delta | May 26, 2007 – c. 2010 | Chicago metropolitan area | Chicago, Illinois | Inactive | |
| Epsilon | June 17, 2007 – c. 2015 | Philadelphia metro area | Elkins Park, Pennsylvania | Inactive | |
| Zeta | July 1, 2012 – c. 2015 | Newark metropolitan area | Newark, New Jersey | Inactive | (Note: Chapter served Northern New Jersey and the five Boroughs of New York City.) |
| **Chi** | February 2, 2025 | United States | Virtual | Active | |

== See also ==
- Cultural interest fraternities and sororities
