= Ruth Gaviria =

Colombian businesswoman (born 1961)

- Born: 1961 (age 64–65)
- Education: Tulane University
- Occupations: Chief Marketing Officer, Entercom
- Employer: Entercom
- Children: 1

Ruth Gaviria is a Colombian businesswoman. She is known as the first chief marketing officer of the American media company Entercom and former executive vice president of corporate marketing at the Spanish-language broadcast television network Univision.

== Early life ==
Gaviria was born in 1961 and graduated from Tulane University with a degree in genetics.

== Career ==
Beginning in 1987, Gaviria worked for companies such as Miller Brewing Company and Procter & Gamble. In 1992, she joined Colgate-Palmolive as the director of multicultural markets. Advertising Age recognized her work at Colgate on its "The Marketing 100" list. In 1999, Gaviria became the vice president of marketing and sales at Fusion Networks.

Gaviria has also worked as the director of marketing for People en Español, the vice president of Hispanic ventures at Meredith Corporation and developed the lifestyle magazine, Siempre Mujer. In 2010, she began working as a senior vice president of corporate marketing for the Spanish language television broadcaster, Univision. Gaviria became executive vice president of corporate marketing at Univision in July 2013. She also rebranded the UniMás network.

Gaviria was named the first chief marketing officer of Entercom in February 2016. She has been recognized by Fast Company and AdAge as one of the "Top 100 Most Creative People in Business" and "Top Women to Watch", respectively, and is a board member for the Library of American Broadcasting, American Lebanese Syrian Associated Charities and St. Jude Children's Research Hospital.
