= Delta Theta Tau =

American community-based sorority

- ΔΘΤ
- Founded: October 16, 1903; 123 years ago Muncie, Indiana
- Type: Service
- Affiliation: Independent
- Status: Active
- Emphasis: Community based, non-collegiate
- Scope: North America
- Motto: Grit wins!
- Member badge
- Colors: Olive Green and White
- Symbol: Vertical Diamond
- Flower: White rose
- Jewel: Diamond and Emerald
- Publication: GRIT Magazine
- Philanthropy: National Foundation for Ectodermal Dysplasia (NFED)
- Chapters: 72
- Members: 180,000 lifetime
- Nickname: Deltas, Delts, or Delta Theta
- Headquarters: c/o Beth Wallis; 500 S Colfax; Martinsville, Indiana 46151-2309; United States
- Website: deltathetatau.org

Delta Theta Tau (ΔΘΤ) is a North American service sorority that is community based and non-collegiate. It was founded on October 16, 1903, in Muncie, Indiana. Delta Theta Tau was the first non-sectarian sorority. Its members are only required to "believe in a higher power." The sorority has 72 chapters in the United States and over 50 alumnae chapters in the United States and Canada.

== History ==
In the early 1900s, it was very common for Greek letter organizations to form in high schools. Many of the high school organizations did not extend past their immediate schools. Delta Theta Tau would become much more. The organization began as the Tyrolean Club. its founders were:

- Nora Spurgeon Charman
- Olive Spurgeon Gage
- Ethel Busch Lesh
- Betsy Gordon Gibert
- Charlene Prutzman Rector

At the home of Betsy Gordon on October 16, 1903, the group decided to change its name to Delta Theta Tau. That evening, Ethel Busch was chosen as the leader. They also selected colors and drew up a constitution. The first pledges were Bess Staigers, Charline Knapp Murray, Anna Hilling, Della Ault, and Florence Jackson.

Initially, the organization was solely social but changed over time into a service sorority. The group's is now "dedicated to the advancement of philanthropy and charity, nonsectarian, nonacademic, promoting welfare for all and fostering the spirit of good fellowship."

The Beta chapter was installed on February 9, 1905, in Elwood, Indiana. Also in 1905, Winnie Hartley of Muncie, Indiana designed the badge, which has remained the same ever since. Nora Spurgeon Charman was the first of the founders to die and it was in her honor that the founders' names would be included in the sorority's ritual.

The first convention was held in 1906. In 1907 the third chapter was installed in Tipton, Indiana. By 1913, there were eleven active chapters. The sorority's newsletter, Grit, was first published in 1917. By 1920, Delta Theta Tau had eighteen chapters.

Today there are 72 active chapters and 53 alumnae chapters. There are 180,000 members who have been initiated into the sorority.

== Symbols ==
The symbol of Delta Theta Tau is the diamond. The sorority's colors are olive green and white. Its flower is the white rose. Its jewels are diamond and emerald. Its motto is "Grit Wins", the motto of the founder's high school class.

== Philanthropy ==
Delta Theta Tau Sorority is a service sorority that raises money through various efforts for many different charities. Over the last ten years, Delta Theta Tau has contributed time and money to the National Foundation for Ectodermal Dysplasias (NFED).

The Delta Theta Tau Golden Hand Fund is a non-profit entity within the organization that provides charitable contributions to various philanthropies. Delta Theta Tau is unique in that it has a separate fund that is used for members entering their golden years who experience financial difficulties. Delta Home provides anonymous assistance to members who apply.

== Chapters ==
Following is an incomplete list of chapters, with active chapters indicated in bold and inactive chapters in italics.

Chapter	Charter date and range	Location	Province	Status	Ref.
**Alpha**	October 16, 1903	Muncie, Indiana	Alpha	Active	
**Beta**	February 9, 1905	Elwood, Indiana	Alpha	Active	
**Zeta**		Bloomington, Indiana	Theta	Active	
Theta		Greencastle, Indiana	Alpha	Inactive	
**Lambda**		Union City, Indiana	Alpha	Active	
**Xi**		Portland, Indiana	Beta	Active	
**Sigma**		Marion, Indiana	Beta	Active	
**Tau**		Valparaiso, Indiana	Beta	Active	
**Phi**		Lewisburg, Ohio	Gamma	Active	
**Alpha Delta**		Huntington, Indiana	Beta	Active	
**Alpha Omicron**		Terre Haute, Indiana	Alpha	Active	
**Alpha Rho**		Chesterton, Indiana	Beta	Active	
**Alpha Omega**		Brazil, Indiana	Alpha	Active	
**Beta Zeta**		Warsaw, Indiana	Beta	Active	
Beta Nu		Winchester, Indiana	Alpha	Inactive	
**Beta Xi**		Lawrenceville, Illinois	Epsilon	Active	
**Beta Sigma**		Clinton, Indiana	Alpha	Active	
Beta Omega		Denver, Colorado	Zeta	Inactive	
**Gamma Gamma**		Washington, Indiana	Theta	Active	
**Gamma Xi**		Bakersfield, California	Delta	Active	
**Gamma Pi**		New Paris, Ohio	Gamma	Active	
**Gamma Upsilon**		West Frankfort, Illinois	Epsilon	Active	
**Delta Kappa**		Anna, Illinois	Epsilon	Active	
**Delta Xi**		Alexandria, Indiana	Alpha	Active	
**Delta Chi**		Monticello, Indiana	Beta	Active	
**Epsilon Lambda**		Pinckneyville, Illinois	Epsilon	Active	
**Epsilon Mu**		Sullivan, Indiana	Theta	Active	
**Epsilon Rho**		San Jose, California	Delta	Active	
**Epsilon Omega**		Crawfordsville, Indiana	Alpha	Active	
**Zeta Alpha**		Redkey, Indiana	Beta	Active	
**Zeta Zeta**		Plymouth, Indiana	Beta	Active	
**Zeta Theta**		Pana, Illinois	Epsilon	Active	
**Zeta Lambda**		Shelbyville, Indiana	Theta	Active	
**Zeta Upsilon**		Seneca, Illinois	Epsilon	Active	
**Zeta Chi**		Dunkirk, Indiana	Beta	Active	
**Zeta Omega**		Highland, Indiana	Beta	Active	
Eta Alpha		Portland, Oregon	Eta	Inactive	
**Eta Beta**		Odon, Indiana	Theta	Active	
**Eta Zeta**		LaGrange, Indiana	Beta	Active	
**Eta Kappa**		Brookville, Indiana	Theta	Active	
**Eta Lambda**		Noblesville, Indiana	Alpha	Active	
Eta Mu		Goshen, Indiana	Beta	Inactive	
**Theta Delta**		Sparta, Illinois	Epsilon	Active	
**Theta Iota**		Delano, California	Delta	Active	
**Theta Kappa**		South Whitley, Indiana	Beta	Active	
**Theta Lambda**		Roachdale, Indiana	Alpha	Active	
**Theta Mu**		Eaton, Ohio	Gamma	Active	
**Theta Nu**		Albany, Indiana	Beta	Active	
**Theta Zeta**		Seymour, Indiana	Theta	Active	
**Iota Mu**		Lynn, Indiana	Alpha	Active	
**Iota Chi**		Spencer, Indiana	Theta	Active	
**Kappa Mu**		Carlisle, Indiana	Theta	Active	
**Kappa Xi**		Brookville, Ohio	Gamma	Active	
**Kappa Omicron**		Wood River, Illinois	Epsilon	Active	
**Kappa Rho**		New Carlile, Indiana	Beta	Active	
**Lambda Alpha**		Tacoma, Washington	Eta	Active	
**Lambda Gamma**		Wichita, Kansas	Zeta	Active	
**Lambda Epsilon**		Plainfield, Indiana	Alpha	Active	
**Lambda Eta**		Franklin, Indiana	Theta	Active	
**Lambda Theta**		Martinsville, Indiana	Theta	Active	
**Lambda Nu**		Mooresville, Indiana	Alpha	Active	
**Lambda Sigma**		Phoenix, Arizona	Delta	Active	
**Mu Lambda**		Stockton, California	Delta	Active	
**Nu Alpha**		Oxford, Ohio	Gamma	Active	
**Nu Theta**		Boonville, Indiana	Theta	Active	
**Nu Tau**		Greenwood, Indiana	Theta	Active	
**Xi Epsilon**		Yakima, Washington	Eta	Active	
**Xi Gamma**		Cuyahoga Falls, Ohio	Gamma	Active	
Xi Nu		Owensburg, Indiana	Theta	Inactive	
**Xi Phi**		Marissa, Illinois	Epsilon	Active	
**Xi Omega**		Hurst, Texas	Zeta	Active	
**Omicron Alpha**		Woodlawn, Illinois	Epsilon	Active	
Omicron Gamma		Escondido, California	Delta	Inactive	
**Omicron Delta**		Fresno, California	Delta	Active	
Omicron Omicron		Lodi, California	Delta	Inactive	
**Omicron Pi**		Bethel, Missouri	Epsilon	Active	
**Omicron Psi**		Red Bud, Illinois	Epsilon	Active	
**Pi Alpha**		New Athens, Illinois	Epsilon	Active	
**Pi Beta**		Mascoutah, Illinois	Epsilon	Active	
**Pi Gamma**		St. Peters, Missouri	Epsilon	Active	

|Pi Delta | |Moberly, Missouri |Epsilon |Active | |}

== Notable members ==
=== Honorary members ===
- Shirley Temple Black, actress
- Mary Pickford, actress
