= Delta Nu Zeta =

American college sorority

- ΔΝΖ
- Founded: November 11, 2003; 22 years ago Florida State University
- Type: Service
- Affiliation: Independent
- Status: Active
- Scope: Local
- Pillars: Passion, Sisterhood, Charity
- Colors: Millennium Blue and Cotton Candy Pink
- Symbol: Silver shooting star
- Flower: White gladiolus
- Mascot: Red fox
- Philanthropy: Companion Animal Rescue Endeavor
- Chapters: 2
- Nickname: Delta Nu, DNZ
- Headquarters: Tallahassee, Florida; United States
- Website: www.deltanuzetafsu.org

Delta Nu Zeta (ΔΝΖ) is an American social and service sorority founded in 2003 at Florida State University in Tallahassee, Florida. Delta Nu Zeta has two chapters, with its Beta chapter placed at the University of Florida.

== History ==
Delta Nu Zeta was founded on November 11, 2003 at Florida State University in Tallahassee, Florida by Amy Destadio and Megan Heitman. Delta Nu Zeta is a social and service-oriented sorority that promotes the welfare of the community, academic excellence, and life-long bonds among its sisters. It considers itself an alternative to traditional Panhellenic sororities.

A second chapter, Beta, was established at the University of Florida in 2012 by Mina Radman, Briana Rittersporn, Michelle Amit, Shuyao “Susan” Zhang, Lori Golanka, and Madison Hofeld.

== Symbols ==
The sorority's official crest is found on the Beta chapter's website. It features a shining star, sword, and tower, as well as an inscription of their pillars in greek. It was designed by Savannah Walker, Beta chapter, in 2026, and was adopted as the official crest the same year.

Delta Nu Zeta has three pillars: Passion, Sisterhood, and Charity. The sorority's colors are millennium blue and cotton candy pink. Its symbol is a silver shooting star, and its mascot is the red fox. Its flower is the white gladiolus. Delta Nu Zeta is often referred to as Delta Nu or DNZ.

== Activities ==
The sorority hosts a variety of social events for its members, including fall rush, homecoming, semi-formal and formal events, and sisterhood retreats.

== Philanthropy ==
Delta Nu Zeta's Alpha Chapter's philanthropy is Companion Animal Rescue Endeavor (CARE). The Beta chapter's philanthropy is Alachua County Special Olympics. Events for CARE include Puppies and Pumpkins and Pups and Kisses, while events for Alachua County Special Olympics includes Cornhole for a Cause, their annual fundraiser.

The sorority's members also participate in various service and philanthropic projects. The sorority has organized or participated in events such as fundraising for Cauz for Paws animal rescue, Oktoberfest for the Ronald McDonald House, Pink Pumpkin Patch for breast cancer awareness, the Haiti Grass Project, Reindeer Run 5K, and the Miracle Network Dance Marathon. In 2025, one of its sisters was recognized by Florida State University as the Undergraduate Humanitarian of the Year nominee for her efforts as the sorority's fundraising chair.

== Chapters ==
Following is a list of Delta Nu Zeta chapters.

Chapter	Charter date and range	Institution	Location	Status	Ref.
Alpha	November 11, 2003	Florida State University	Tallahassee, Florida	Active	
Beta	March 26, 2012	University of Florida	Gainesville, Florida	Active	

== Controversies ==
Delta Nu Zeta has no affiliation with the organization that uses the same name for a rental property near Maharishi University of Management in Fairfield, Iowa. That property's owner, CI Corporation, began using the name "Delta Nu Zeta House" after being sued by international collegiate sorority, Delta Zeta in 2013 (also no affiliation). That lawsuit sought relief for CI Corporation's use of the name "Delta Zeta House" for their unaffiliated building. CI continues to use the modified name and URL, DeltaNuZeta.org, as of 2025.
