= Gustav Wahlund =

American politician (1856–1934)

Gustav Wahlund (February 2, 1856 – November 9, 1934) was an American Lutheran clergyman and politician.

Wahlund was born in Dalsland, Sweden and emigrated to the United States and then settled in Minnesota, in 1882. He graduated from Augustana College and Theological Seminary (now Augustana College) in 1884. Wahlund lived in Spring Lake, Isanti County, Minnesota with his wife and family. They then moved to Wyoming, Minnesota and Wahlund served as a Lutheran minister. Wahlund served in the Minnesota House of Representatives from 1891 to 1894 and in the Minnesota Senate from 1923 to 1926. He was a Republican.
