= Conrad Bergendoff =

American theologian and historian

Conrad Johan (John) Immanuel Bergendoff (December 3, 1895 – December 23, 1997) was an American Lutheran theologian and historian. He served as the fifth president of Augustana College in Rock Island, Illinois, from 1935 to 1962.

== Early life ==
Conrad Bergendoff was born in Shickley, Nebraska, to Carl August and Emma Mathilda Fahlberg Bergendoff. He spent his youth in Middletown, Connecticut. He graduated from Augustana College, Rock Island, Illinois, in 1915 and earned his M.A. at the University of Pennsylvania in 1916. He returned to Rock Island to complete the B. Div. degree at the Augustana Theological Seminary. Bergendoff was ordained into the ministry of the Augustana Lutheran Synod on June 12, 1921, in Chicago. He pursued advanced study at Sweden's Uppsala University, serving as personal secretary to Swedish Archbishop Nathan Söderblom during the Stockholm Conference on Life and Work in 1925. He earned his Ph.D. from the University of Chicago in 1928.

== Career ==
Bergendoff became dean of the Augustana Theological Seminary in 1931, and was elected to succeed Gustav Andreen as president of Augustana College in 1935. He saw the college through the difficult years of the Great Depression, through its separation from Augustana Theological Seminary in 1948, and into a long period of substantial growth and increasing prestige.

Among his most notable achievements was the ecumenical spirit he engendered in American Lutherans from the late 1930s going forward. Instrumental in gathering together the myriad branches of the European immigrant Lutheran bodies, Bergendoff used his considerable influence and power within the Augustana Synod to help unite those Swedish-background churches into the Lutheran Church in America (1962-1987), a precursor of the current Evangelical Lutheran Church in America. Bergendoff also devoted considerable attention to the ecumenical movement between major Protestant denominations, and on a more local and regional level he made many inroads towards official cooperation with leaders of conservative and reformed movements in American Judaism.

== Selected works ==
- The Church of the Lutheran Reformation: A Historical Survey of Lutheranism (Saint Louis, Concordia Pub. House, 1967)
- Olavus Petri and the ecclesiastical transformation in Sweden, 1521-1552: a study in the Swedish Reformation (Philadelphia, Fortress Press, 1965)
- The Doctrine of the Church in American Lutheranism (Philadelphia, Muhlenberg Press, 1947)
- The Making and Meaning of the Augsburg Confession (Rock Island, IL, Augustana Book Concern, 1930)

== Recognition ==
In recognition for his work, Bergendoff received six honorary doctorates throughout his life, including one from Sweden's Uppsala University. The fine arts building at Augustana College, constructed during his presidency, was named the Bergendoff Hall of Fine Arts. The Lutheran noted Bergendoff as "one of the most influential people in 20th-century American Lutheranism".

== Personal life ==
As a young pastor in Chicago he met and married Gertrude Elizabeth Carlson of Rockford, Illinois, the daughter of Swedish immigrants. Their children were Conrad born in 1924, Beatrice born in 1928, and Elizabeth born in 1937. Bergendoff and his wife were the grandparents to nine grandchildren and seven great-grandchildren.

== Other sources ==
- Tredway, Thomas (2014) Conrad Bergendoff's Faith and Work. A Swedish-American Lutheran, 1895-1997 (Augustana Historical Society) ISBN 978-0910184014
