= SS Augustana Victory =

World War II Victory ship of the United States

- A typical Victory ship

History

United States
- Name: SS Augustana Victory
- Namesake: Augustana College
- Ordered: as a Type VC2-S-AP2 hull, MCV hull 755
- Builder: Permanente Metals Corporation, Richmond, California Kaiser Richmond No. 2 Yard
- Laid down: 5 April 1945
- Launched: 16 May 1945
- Commissioned: 9 June 1945
- Identification: Official number: 247986
- Fate: Sank 1 May 1963

General characteristics
- Class & type: Victory ship
- Displacement: 4,480 long tons (4,550 t) (standard); 15,580 long tons (15,830 t) (full load)
- Length: 455 ft (139 m)
- Beam: 62 ft (19 m)
- Draft: 29 ft 2 in (8.89 m)
- Installed power: 2 × Babcock & Wilcox header-type boilers, 525psi 750°; 6,000 shp (4,500 kW)
- Propulsion: 1 × Westinghouse turbine; double Westinghouse Main Reduction Gears; 1 × shaft
- Speed: 15.5 kn (17.8 mph; 28.7 km/h)
- Capacity: 7,800 t (7,700 long tons) DWT; 453,210 cu ft (12,833 m^{3}) (non-refrigerated)
- Complement: 62 Merchant Marine and 28 US Naval Armed Guards
- Armament: During WW2; 1 × 5 in (127 mm)/38-caliber dual-purpose gun; 1 × 3 in (76 mm)/50-caliber dual-purpose gun; 8 × 20 mm (0.8 in) Oerlikon cannons anti-aircraft (AA) mounts

SS Augustana Victory was built and operated as Victory ship class cargo ship which operated as a cargo carrier in World War II, and Vietnam War.

== Construction ==
Augustana Victory was laid down under U.S. Maritime Commission contract by Permanente Metals Corporation, Richmond, California, Kaiser Richmond No. 2 Yard, on 5 April 1945, under the Emergency Shipbuilding program. She was launched on 16 May 1945 and was delivered to the War Shipping Administration (WSA) on 9 June 1945. She is named after Augustana College in Rock Island, Illinois. Early Victoryships were named after Allied nations, then 218 American cities were picked for names. Next Kaiser and the Navy department picked 150 names to honor American colleges.

== World War II ==
The SS Augustana Victory was used near the end of World War II. The ship's United States Maritime Commission designation was VC2-S-AP3, hull number P No. 2 (755), Victory #755. The Maritime Commission turned her over to a civilian contractor for operation. Victory ships were designed to replace the earlier Liberty Ships. Liberty ships were designed to be used just for WW2. Victory ships were designed to last longer and serve the US Navy after the war. The Victory ship differed from a Liberty ship in that they were: faster, longer and wider, taller, with a thinner stack set farther toward the superstructure and had a long raised forecastle.

During World War II Augustana Victory operated as a merchantman and was chartered to the Interocean Steamship Company of San Francisco. With a civilian crew and United States Navy Armed Guard to man the ship guns. SS Augustana Victory served in the Pacific Ocean in World War II as part of the Pacific War.

== Post World War II ==
In 1948 the Augustana Victory was sold by the [War Shipping Administration to the United States Lines of New York and renamed the SS American lawyer. American lawyer worked the moving general cargo and US Mail on Trade route 12 (U.S, North Atlantic/Far East) and Trade Route 16 (Atlantic, Gulf/Australasia). She regular traded was the Benelux trade route.

In 1956 she was sold to the American Union Transport Inc. of New York and renamed the SS Transcaribbean.

== Vietnam War ==
Starting in 1961 the SS Transcaribbean supported the US in the Vietnam War (1961–1975) as a Merchant Marine transport. The US Coast Guard Squadron One chartered the SS Transcaribbean and other ships to move 17 patrol boats to the Philippines for Vietnam duty. SS Transcaribbean was used by the Military Sea Transportation Service (MSTS) to deliver: bulldozers, cranes, steel and cement for use by US Navy Seabees.

== Sinking ==
On 1 May 1963, the SS Transcaribbean was on its way from New York to Bermuda with general cargo. SS Transcaribbean wrecked and was lodged on to rocks on the small Las Cabritas inland, near Isla de Cabras, off of San Juan, Puerto Rico. Not able to refloat the ship she was abandoned and remained at the site, just under the waterline at 18.4729722°N 66.1329138°W.

== See also ==
- List of Victory ships
- Liberty ship
- Type C1 ship
- Type C2 ship
- Type C3 ship

== Sources ==
- Sawyer, L.A. and W.H. Mitchell. Victory ships and tankers: The history of the ‘Victory’ type cargo ships and of the tankers built in the United States of America during World War II, Cornell Maritime Press, 1974, 0-87033-182-5.
- United States Maritime Commission: Victory Ships alphabetical list War II
- Victory Cargo Ships Oregon Shipyards Record Breakers Page 2
