= Epsilon Tau Pi =

American collegiate fraternity

- ΕΤΠ
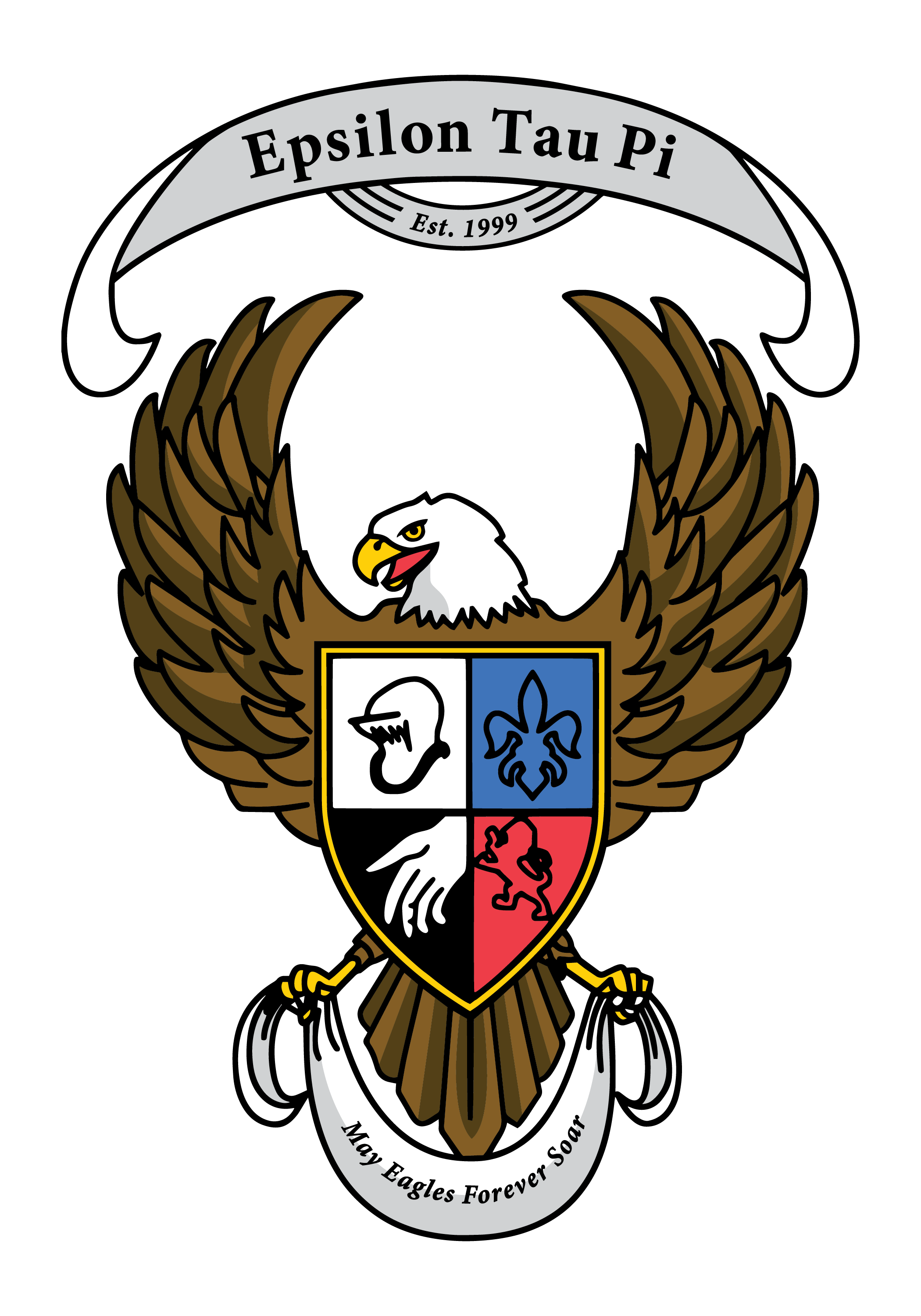
- Founded: April 28, 1999; 27 years ago University of Dayton
- Type: Service
- Affiliation: Independent
- Status: Active
- Emphasis: Eagle Scouts
- Scope: National (US)
- Motto: "May Eagles Forever Soar!"
- Colors: Red white blue black
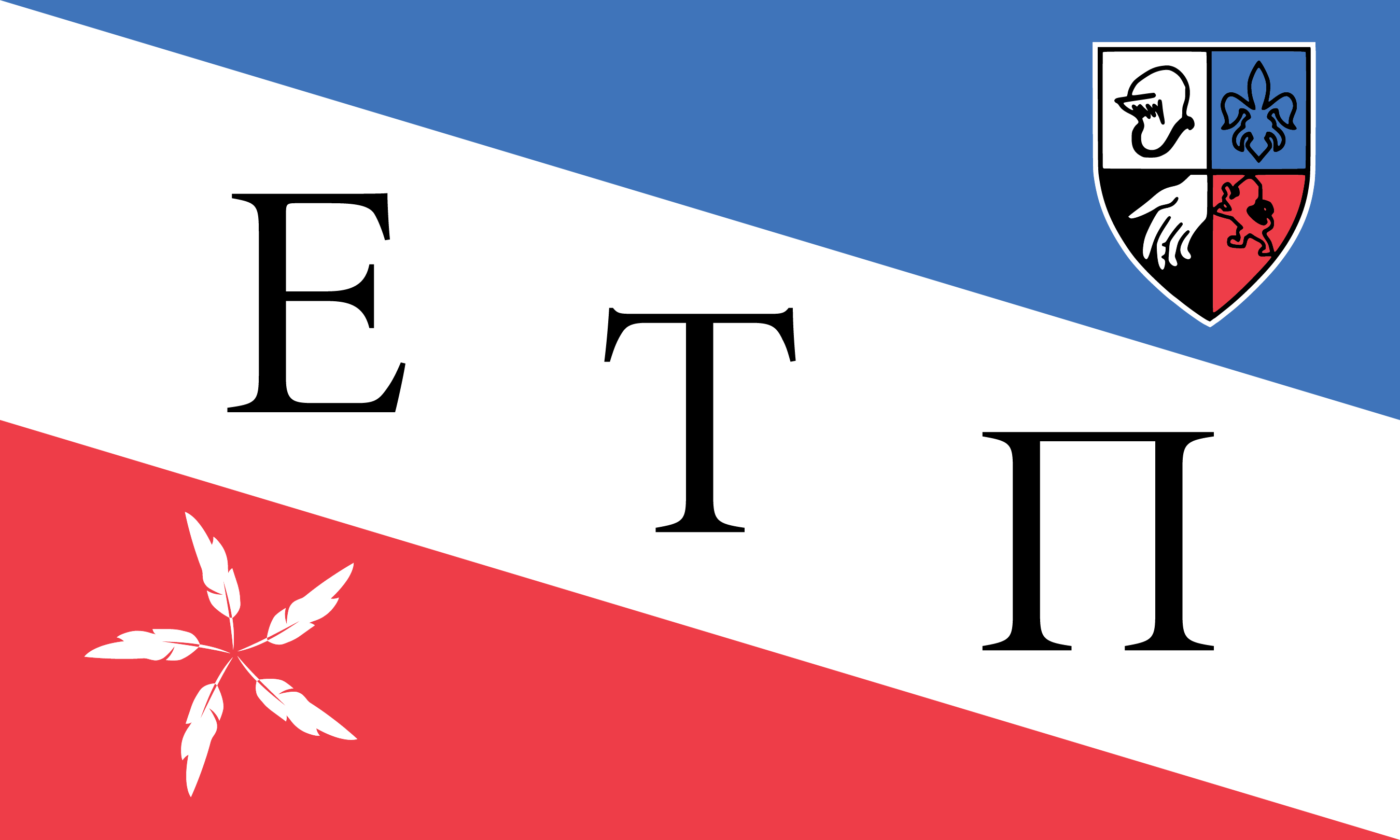
- Flag
- Mascot: Bald eagle
- Chapters: 11
- Colonies: 6
- Headquarters: Epsilon Tau Pi Fraternity, Inc. P.O. Box 282; Dayton, Ohio 45409; United States
- Website: epsilontaupi.org

Epsilon Tau Pi (ΕΤΠ) Fraternity was founded in 1999 at the University of Dayton in Dayton, Ohio. Its objective is to provide a collegiate fraternity for Eagle Scouts at universities and colleges in the United States.

== History ==
Epsilon Tau Pi fraternity was founded by Michael Hammes and Michael A. Mahon, who, with six other students at the University of Dayton, became the founding members of the Alpha chapter. All eight were Eagle Scouts, which became the focus of the new organization. This group of eight formally commenced operation of Alpha chapter on April 28, 1999; this date is celebrated by the fraternity as its national Founder's Day.

In 2001, the Alpha chapter authorized the formation of a five-member national executive board. The board serves to support and bolster the expansion of the fraternity, as well as to support existing chapters.

In 2003 the fraternity began to hold convocations every other year, where alumni and collegiate members alike could meet and conduct fraternity business. Officers and alumni delegates to the national executive board are elected at the convocation.

The fraternity was incorporated in Ohio on January 21, 2006.

The Epsilon Tau Pi Foundation, a charitable and educational 501(c)(3) organization, was registered on December 19, 2011, to provide scholarship assistance.

While not a member of the Association of College Honor Societies, Epsilon Tau Pi has aspects of both an honor society and service fraternity and is characterized by regular projects undertaken for local communities.

== Purpose ==
The fraternity was formed with several goals in mind. Foremost, the fraternity dedicated itself to upholding the high ideals of Scouting's Eagle rank. The fraternity enables its members to participate in and promote service to others, to Scouting, the community, their university, and the fraternity itself. Members of the fraternity must maintain strict academic standards, in addition to participation in individual, group, and chapter-wide service projects.

Epsilon Tau Pi was formed for five different purposes.

1. To create a brotherhood of Eagle Scouts.
2. To serve Scouting and the community.
3. To uphold the principles of Scouting.
4. To promote the achievement of the rank of Eagle Scout.
5. To provide an example to all students of loyalty to the alma mater.

== Symbols ==
The fraternity's colors are red, white, blue, and black. Its symbol and mascot is the bald eagle. The motto of Epsilon Tau Pi is "May Eagles Forever Soar!"

== Membership ==
There are five classes of membership: candidate, active, honorary, alumni, and advisory (faculty).

Membership in Epsilon Tau Pi is open to all university students who have achieved the rank of Eagle Scout in Scouts BSA or have attained the highest award in their country's Scouting organization.

Membership is available to students at those institutions where the fraternity has chapters, or who are attending nearby schools.

The fraternity requires a candidacy period of at least six and no more than ten weeks.

== Governance ==
The chairman of the national executive board (NEB) is elected by all members of the fraternity at convocation and serves as the chairman and chief executive officer of the fraternity. The position was established in 2003, approximately two years after the formation of the board.

Other elected positions on the NEB include vice-chairman, secretary, South Atlantic regional director, Midwest regional director, and North Central regional director. Appointed positions on the NEB include national fraternity education officer (FEO), financial director, marketing director, IT director, social media director, and scholarship director/foundation chairman. All positions have a term of two years.

== Activities ==
One of the more prominent activities of the fraternity is the Merit Badge College (MBC) in support of local Scouting troops. MBCs are annual events hosted by chapters or colonies of Epsilon Tau Pi, offering Scouts the opportunity to earn merit badges not otherwise offered outside of summer camps. Badges such as chemistry and programming may be earned with the advantage of college-level facilities, to which Scouts would not otherwise have access. The MBC is held annually by the Alpha, Beta, and Iota chapters.

== Chapters ==
Following is a list of Epsilon Tau Pi chapters and colonies. Active chapters are indicated in bold. Inactive chapters are in italics.

Chapter	Charter date and range	Institution	Location	Status	Ref.
**Alpha**	April 28, 1999	University of Dayton	Dayton, Ohio	Active	
**Beta**	May 2002 ?–20xx ?; November 29, 2016	Ohio State University	Columbus, Ohio	Active	(Note: After going dormant, the chapter reformed as a colony on September 9, 2015.)
**Gamma**	March 27, 2007	Western Carolina University	Cullowhee, North Carolina	Active	(Note: Chapter started as a colony on April 23, 2005.)
Delta colony	N/A	Indiana State University	Terre Haute, Indiana	Inactive	(Note: Colony was established on December 11, 2005, but went inactive before being chartered.)
Epsilon colony	N/A	California University of Pennsylvania	California, Pennsylvania	Inactive	(Note: Colony formed on June 4, 2007, but went inactive before being chartered.)
**Zeta**	May 20, 2012	West Virginia University	Morgantown, West Virginia	Active	(Note: Chapter started as a colony on October 6, 2008.)
**Eta**	April 16, 2011	Appalachian State University	Boone, North Carolina	Active	(Note: Chapter started as a colony on November 9, 2009.)
**Theta**	April 17, 2014	Georgia Southern University	Statesboro, Georgia	Active	(Note: Chapter started as a colony on November 16, 2010)
**Iota**	August 28, 2014	Robert Morris University	Pittsburgh Area, Pennsylvania	Active	(Note: Chapter started as a colony on September 18, 2012.)
Kappa colony	N/A	Augustana College (Illinois)	Rock Island, Illinois	Inactive	(Note: Colony started on December 20, 2012, but went inactive before being chartered.)
Lambda colony	N/A	Missouri Western State University	St. Joseph, Missouri	Inactive	(Note: Colony started on January 30, 2015, but went inactive before being chartered.)
**Mu**	April 6, 2019	East Carolina University	Greenville, North Carolina	Inactive	(Note: Chapter started as a colony on September 26, 2017.)
**Nu colony**	November 13, 2017	Northwest Missouri State University	Maryville, Missouri	Active	(Note: Colony started on November 13, 2017.)
Xi colony	N/A	Kansas State University	Manhattan, Kansas	Inactive	(Note: Colony started on February 5, 2018, but went inactive in 2022 before being chartered.)
**Omicron**	April 19, 2021	University of North Carolina at Chapel Hill	Chapel Hill, North Carolina	Active	(Note: Chapter started as a colony on March 3, 2018.)
**Pi**	July 12, 2021	University of South Carolina	Columbia, South Carolina	Active	(Note: Chapter formed as a colony on March 7, 2018.)
Rho colony	N/A	University of Cincinnati	Cincinnati, Ohio	Inactive	(Note: Colony started on September 16, 2018, ceasing operations in 2024, but went inactive on May 14, 2024.)
**Sigma colony**	February 18, 2019	Miami University	Oxford, Ohio	Active	(Note: Colony started on February 18, 2019.)
Tau colony	N/A	North Carolina State University	Raleigh, North Carolina	Inactive	(Note: Chapter started on September 17, 2019, ceasing operations in 2023)
**Upsilon**	December 18, 2024	Ohio University	Athens, Ohio	Active	(Note: Colony started on March 1, 2020.)
**Phi**	April 16, 2022	Clemson University	Clemson, South Carolina	Active	(Note: Chapter started as a colony on March 1, 2020.)
**Chi colony**	August 23, 2021	Missouri University of Science and Technology	Rolla, Missouri	Active	(Note: Colony started on August 23, 2021.)
