= Omega Delta Sigma =

American service fraternity for veterans

- ΩΔΣ
- Founded: 1999; 27 years ago University of Florida
- Type: Leadership and Service
- Affiliation: Independent
- Status: Active
- Emphasis: Military
- Scope: National
- Motto: "Professional, Scholars, Warriors"
- Pillars: Selfless Service and Leadership
- Colors: Blue, Black, and Silver
- Symbol: American Flag
- Philanthropy: LT Michael P. Murphy Memorial Scholarship Foundation
- Chapters: 4 (active)
- Headquarters: P.O. Box 903; State College, Pennsylvania 16804; United States
- Website: www.ods.vet

Omega Delta Sigma (ΩΔΣ) is an American collegiate fraternity for veterans. Also known as ODS, it is a leadership and service-based co-ed fraternity.

== History ==
Omega Delta Sigma was founded by Carlos A Espitia at the University of Florida in 1999 as a way for veterans to come together, share experiences, and meet other veterans.

Omega Delta Sigma helps with the transition from military to college life, creates a network of contacts, and offers support and services to veterans. Since its founding, the fraternity has established several chapters located across the United States.

== Symbols ==
The fraternity's colors are blue, black, and silver. Its motto is "Professional, Scholars, Warriors". Its pillars are "Selflessness, Service, and Leadership". Its symbol is the American Flag.

== Membership ==
Potential members must be enrolled in a college or university with a chapter, have a GPA of 2.5, and must be a Veteran of or a currently serving member of the United States Armed Forces Active Duty, Reserve, or National Guard. Veterans must have a discharge other than dishonorable.

== Philanthropy ==
Omega Delta Sigma donates to the LT Michael P. Murphy Memorial Scholarship Foundation, Support the Troops, and Toys for Tots. Each chapter is encouraged to support local charitable organizations as well.

== Chapters ==
Following is a list of Omega Delta Sigma chapters. Active chapters are indicated in bold. Inactive chapters are in italics.

Chapter	Founded	Institution	Location	Status	References
**National Chapter**	2009		State College, Pennsylvania	Active	
**Pennsylvania Alpha**	2009	Pennsylvania State University	University Park, Pennsylvania	Active	
**Texas Beta**		University of North Texas	Denton, Texas	Active	
**Kentucky Alpha**		Eastern Kentucky University	Richmond, Kentucky	Active	
**Colorado Alpha**	2024	University of Denver	Denver, Colorado	Active	
Louisiana Alpha	March 14, 2018	University of New Orleans	New Orleans, Louisiana	Inactive	
New Jersey Alpha	2015	William Paterson University	Wayne, New Jersey	Inactive	
Illinois Alpha	2015	Illinois State University	Normal, Illinois	Inactive	
Pennsylvania Delta	2015	Pennsylvania College of Technology	Williamsport, Pennsylvania	Inactive	
Pennsylvania Gamma	2014	Penn State Lehigh Valley	Center Valley, Pennsylvania	Inactive	
Pennsylvania Beta	2013	Penn State Altoona	Logan Township, Pennsylvania	Inactive	
Ohio Beta	2012	University of Cincinnati	Cincinnati, Ohio	Inactive	
Massachusetts Alpha	2012	University of Massachusetts Amherst	Amherst, Massachusetts	Inactive	
California Alpha	March 8, 2012	California State University, Fresno	Fresno, California	Inactive	(Note: Chapter was established as a colony on January 7, 2011.)
Virginia Alpha	February 20, 2012	Virginia Commonwealth University	Richmond, Virginia	Inactive	(Note: Chapter formed as a colony on March 9, 2011.)
Nevada Alpha	February 2012	University of Nevada, Reno	Reno, Nevada	Inactive	
Texas Alpha	2009	Texas A&M University–Kingsville	Kingsville, Texas	Inactive	
Florida Beta	1999	Saint Leo University	St. Leo, Florida	Inactive	
Florida Alpha	1999	University of Florida	Gainesville, Florida	Inactive	

== See also ==
- Professional fraternities and sororities
- Service fraternities and sororities
