= Augustana College (Illinois) =

Lutheran college in Rock Island, Illinois, US

- Type: Private liberal arts college
- Established: 1860; 166 years ago
- Academic affiliations: Annapolis Group
- Endowment: $252.6 million (2025)
- President: Andrea Talentino
- Students: 2,570 (fall 2024)
- Undergraduates: 2,522 (fall 2024)
- Postgraduates: 48 (fall 2024)
- Location: Rock Island, Illinois, United States; 41.5023°N 90.5504°W
- Campus: Urban, 115 acres (47 ha)
- Newspaper: Augustana Observer
- Colors: (Navy blue and gold)
- Nickname: Vikings
- Sporting affiliations: NCAA Division III – CCIW
- Mascot: Vikings
- Website: augustana.edu

Augustana College is a private Lutheran liberal arts college in Rock Island, Illinois, United States. The college enrolls approximately 2,500 students. Its campus is adjacent to the Mississippi River and covers 115 acres (46.5 ha) of hilly, wooded land.

== History ==
Augustana College was founded as Augustana College and Theological Seminary in 1860 by the Scandinavian Evangelical Lutheran Augustana Synod. Located first in Chicago, it moved to Paxton, Illinois, in 1863 and to Rock Island, Illinois, its current home, in 1875.

After 1890, an increasingly large Swedish American community in America promoted a new institutional structure, including a lively Swedish-language press, many new churches, several colleges, and a network of ethnic organizations. The result was to foster a sense of Swedishness with pride in the United States. Thus, there emerged a self-confident Americanized generation. Augustana College put itself in the lead of the movement to affirm Swedish American identity. Early on all the students had been born in Sweden but by 1890 the second generation of American-born students predominated. They typically had white-collar or professional backgrounds; few were the sons and daughters of farmers and laborers. These middle class youth developed an idealized view of Sweden, characterized by romanticism, patriotism, and idealism, just like their counterparts across the Atlantic. The new generation was especially proud of the Swedish contributions to American democracy and of the creation of a republic that promised liberty and destroyed the menace of slavery.

The college grew by donation of 5 acres (2.0 ha) on the south in 1886 and purchase, enabled by donation of C.J.A. Ericson, of 10–12 acres to the north in 1899.

In 1947, when Conrad Bergendoff was college president, the Augustana Seminary formally separated from Augustana College and became an independent body. It remained on the Rock Island campus until the 1960s, when the seminary moved to Chicago. It merged with other Lutheran seminaries to form the Lutheran School of Theology at Chicago.

== Campus ==
=== Academic buildings ===
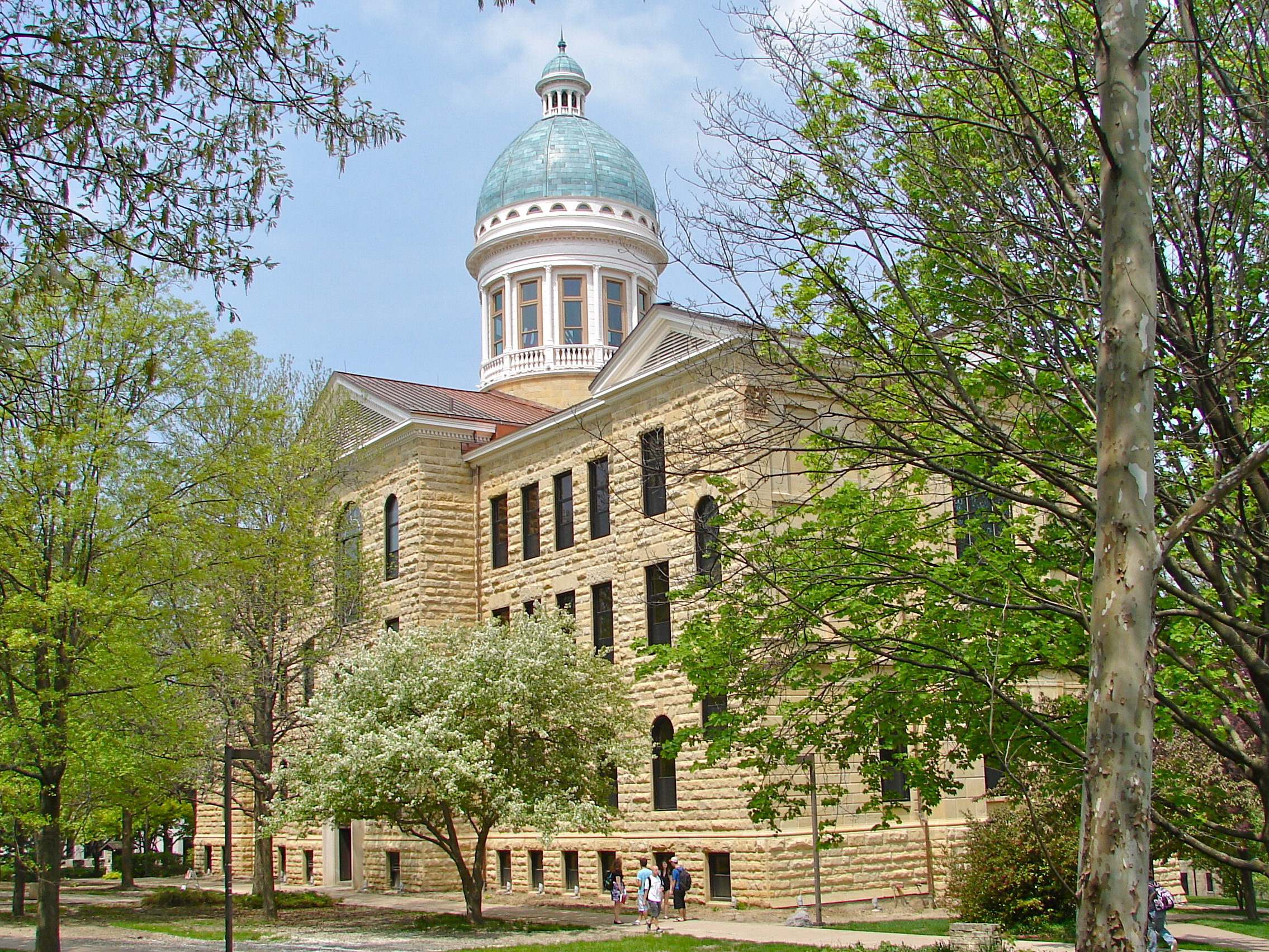
Old Main

Old Main was constructed between 1884 and 1893. It is listed on the National Register of Historic Places. On August 2, 2010, the New Science Building was officially named the Robert A. and Patricia K. Hanson Hall of Science after Robert Hanson, a former John Deere CEO. Hanson, who donated $8 million to the college, credits his success in life to his time spent at Augustana. The science building, dedicated in 1998 and enlarged in 2019, is the largest academic building serving approximately 700 students in 17 majors, minors and concentrations. The Hanson Hall of Science's facilities and resources include seven classrooms, 35 laboratories (including a cadaver lab), a 400 MHz liquid-and solid-state NMR (nuclear magnetic resonance) spectrometer, scanning electron microscope, instrumentation for X-ray powder crystallography and a fully functioning 40-foot (12 m) greenhouse.

In October 2021, Augustana dedicated the Peter J. Lindberg, M.D., Center for Health and Human Performance in honor of alumnus Peter J. Lindberg. The 52,000-square-foot Lindberg Center is home to the college's new kinesiology program and growing public health program, as well as the men's and women's swimming/diving and new water polo teams.

=== Residential complexes ===
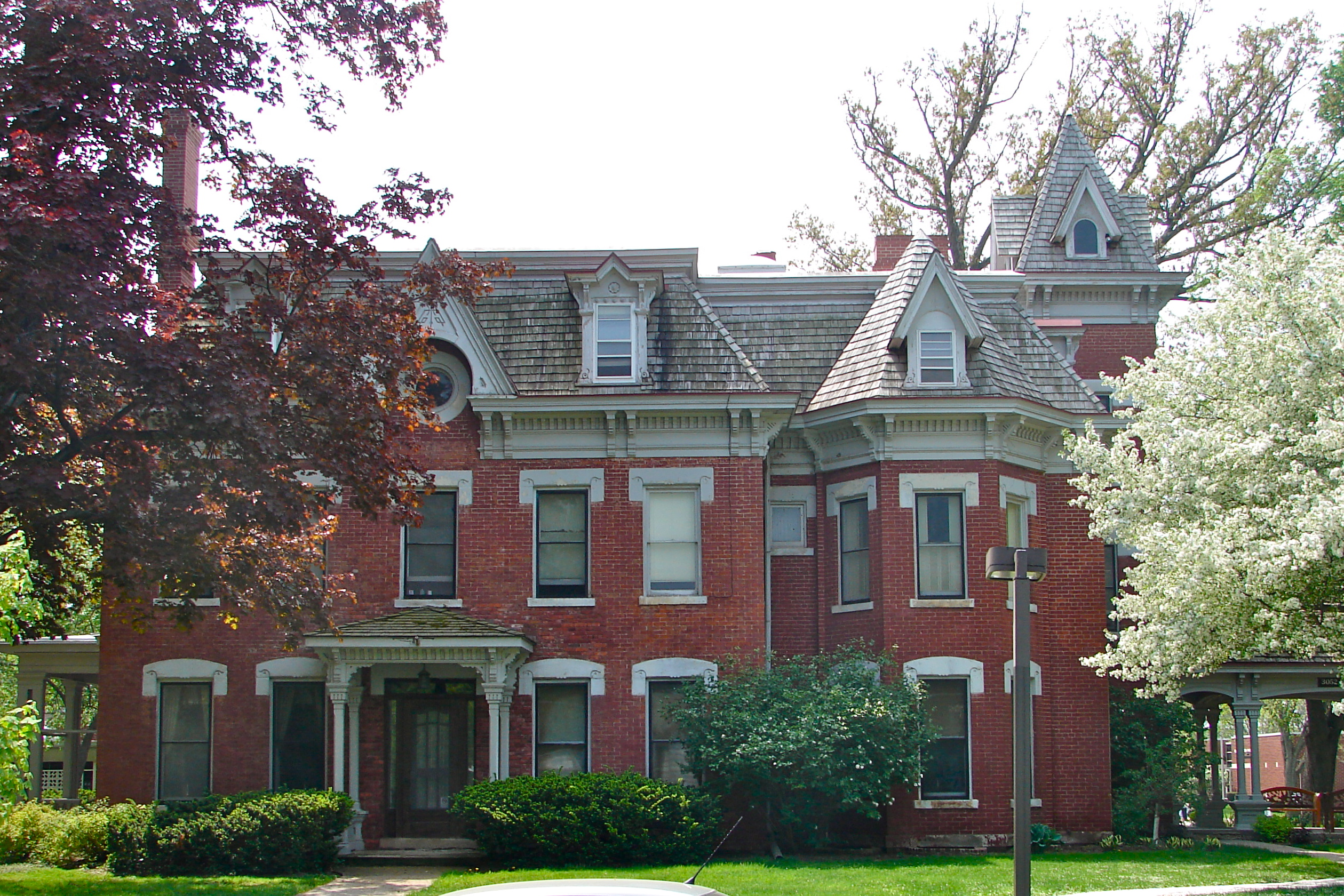
House on the Hill

Augustana has five traditional residence halls: Andreen Hall, Erickson Residence Center, Seminary Hall, Swanson Commons, and Westerlin Residence Center. All five of these residence halls are coeducational. The majority of first-year and sophomore-year students typically reside in one of these five residence halls. For juniors, Augustana also offers Transitional Living Areas (TLAs), apartment-like complexes or traditional off-campus houses administered by the college's Office of Residential Life. These areas usually have 2–6 students who share a bathroom, a kitchen, and other living spaces.

=== Fryxell Geology Museum ===
The Fryxell Geology Museum, named after Augustana geologist Fritiof Fryxell, features a large collection of dinosaurs and fossils, rocks and mineral specimens. Displays include a complete skeleton of a Platecarpus "sea serpent", skulls of Parasaurolophus, Ankylosaurus, Apatosaurus, Allosaurus and Tyrannosaurus rex and a 2-billion-year-old fossil. There is also a complete 22-foot-long (6.7 m) skeleton of Cryolophosaurus, a large, crested carnivorous dinosaur discovered in Antarctica in 1991 by Augustana paleontologist William Hammer. The museum is located in the Swenson Hall of Geosciences.

== Academics ==
The most popular undergraduate majors at Augustana, based on 2021 graduates, were:

- Biology/Biological Sciences (83)
- Psychology (45)
- Business Administration and Management (32)
- Finance (31)
- Accounting (30)
- Communication Sciences and Disorders (27)
- Marketing/Marketing Management (26)

In the 2026 college rankings by U.S. News & World Report, the college was tied at 96 among "National Liberal Arts Colleges".

== Student life ==
=== Organizations ===
Since 1950, Augustana has had a chapter of the Phi Beta Kappa honor society. The college also has non-"Greek" collegiate fraternal organizations, including Epsilon Tau Pi (ΕΤΠ)(Eagle Scouts), Alpha Phi Omega (APO) (service), Sigma Alpha Iota (SAI) (music), Phi Mu Alpha Sinfonia (PMA) (music), Epsilon Sigma Alpha (ESA) (Service), Alpha Psi Omega (ΑΨΩ) (theater), and others. The Omicron chapter of Phrateres, a non-exclusive, non-profit social-service club, was installed here in 1941. Between 1924 and 1967, 23 chapters of Phrateres were installed in universities across North America. (The chapter name "Omicron" was reused for the chapter installed at San José State University.)

Augustana has eleven social Greek groups, six sororities and five fraternities.

Augustana has many other organizations, including a chapter of MENC: The National Association for Music Education, a National Band Association chapter, American Choral Directors Association (ACDA), Paintball Team (NCPA), American String Teachers Association (ASTA), College Democrats of America, College Republicans, Psychology Club, Business Club, DDR Club, Anime Club, Asian Student Organization (ASO), Latinx Unidos, Investment Club, Ladies of Vital Essence (L.O.V.E.), The Order of the Phoenix, Martial Arts Club, Student Government Association and Viking Pups, a club dedicated to training service dogs on campus.

=== Transportation ===
Augustana College is located on the east side of Rock Island and is accessible via the Quad Cities MetroLINK. Routes 10, 53, and 57 provide bus service from campus to downtown Rock Island, downtown Moline and other destinations.

== Athletics ==
Augustana athletic teams are nicknamed as the Vikings. The college is a member of the Division III level of the National Collegiate Athletic Association (NCAA), primarily competing in the College Conference of Illinois and Wisconsin (CCIW) for almost all of their sports since the 1946–47 academic year. The only current exception is women's bowling, in which the Vikings are charter members of the single-sport Central Intercollegiate Bowling Conference (CIBC) that began competition in the 2019–20 season. The Vikings compete in a combined total of 25 male and female team sports, and five out of seven students compete in some form of varsity, club, or intramural sport. The Vikings previously competed as a member of the Illinois Intercollegiate Athletic Conference (IIAC) from 1912–13 to 1936–37.

Augustana College competes in 28 intercollegiate varsity sports: Men's sports include baseball, basketball, cross country, eSports, football, golf, lacrosse, soccer, swimming & diving, tennis, track & field, volleyball, water polo and wrestling; while women's sports include basketball, bowling, cross country, eSports, golf, lacrosse, soccer, softball, swimming & diving, tennis, track & field, volleyball, water polo and wrestling;.

Between 1983 and 1986, the Augustana College football team won four consecutive Division III national championships under Coach Bob Reade. Coach Reade's overall winning percentage of 87% is second only to Larry Kehres and Knute Rockne on the all-time list.

== Notable people ==
=== Alumni ===
- Nina Chanel Abney (2004) — contemporary artist and painter
- Sarah Adam (2013) — wheelchair rugby athlete, first woman to be named to a U.S. wheelchair rugby team roster for the Paralympic Games
- William Albracht (1975) – Vietnam War U.S. Army captain, recipient of three Silver Stars, five Bronze Stars, and three Purple Hearts
- Dave "Gruber" Allen (1980) – television and film actor
- Ken Anderson (1970) – NFL quarterback with the Cincinnati Bengals for 16 seasons; 1981 NFL Most Valuable Player
- Brenda C. Barnes (1975) – former CEO of both Sara Lee and PepsiCo
- Craig Blomberg (1977) – Bible scholar
- A. J. Carlson (BA.1898, MS. 1899) – Chairman of the Physiology Department at the University of Chicago
- Nelly Cheboi (2016) - Founder of TechLit Africa, nominated for and won CNN Hero of 2022
- K. G. William Dahl (1907) – Lutheran pastor and author, founder of Bethphage Mission
- Charlotte Erickson (1945) – historian
- Lane Evans (1974) – former US Congressman (Illinois 17th District).
- Lars Forssell (1947) – Swedish writer and member of the Swedish Academy
- Paul Fryxell (1949) – botanist
- Greta Fryxell (1948) – oceanographer
- Diane Edmund Griffin (1962) – distinguished virologist, member of the National Academy of Sciences
- David Hultgren (1973) – former Illinois State Congressman (94th District)
- Steven Kemenyffy (1964) – ceramic artist
- Apoorva Mandavilli (1994) – investigative journalist and science writer with the New York Times
- Don Morton (1969) – football head coach, North Dakota State and Wisconsin
- Carl Marcus Olson (1932) – developed process to purify silicon for electronic use
- Jeffrey Patneau (2005) – CIA officer killed in Yemen in 2008 and later remembered on CIA Memorial Wall
- Shem-Tov Sabag (attended 1983–84) – Israeli Olympic marathoner
- Thorsten Sellin (1915) – pioneer in scientific criminology
- Theodore Emanuel Schmauk (1910) – Lutheran minister, educator, and author
- Mark Schwiebert (1972) – Mayor of Rock Island, 1989–2009
- Donald K. Sundquist (1957) – former US Congressman (1983–1985) and Governor of Tennessee
- Carl Aaron Swensson (1877) – Lutheran minister and founder of Bethany College
- Robert J. Swieringa (1964) – former member of the Financial Accounting Standards Board (FASB) and former Dean of the Johnson School at Cornell University
- Daniel Tsui (1961) – Nobel Prize winner in physics
- Gustav Wahlund (1884) - Lutheran minister and Minnesota state legislator
- J. E. Wallace Wallin (1897) – psychologist and early advocate of special education

=== Faculty ===
- Fritiof M. Fryxell – chair in geology
- William R. Hammer (former faculty) – paleontologist who found the first dinosaur, Cryolophosaurus, in Antarctica
- Stanley Hauerwas (former faculty) – theologian
- Louise Meiszner (former faculty) – pianist
- Andrea Talentino – political scientist

== See also ==
- SS Augustana Victory
