= Carl Marcus Olson =

Carl Marcus Olson (1911 – May 16, 2011) has been credited as the discoverer of the process to make silicon pure.

== Early life ==
Carl Marcus Olson was born in 1911, to Swedish immigrants in Chicago. His father, Dr. Oscar N. Olson, a clergyman, and his mother, Wilhelmina Peterson Olson raised him and his older sister Heloise in Sioux City, Iowa, and Rock Island, Illinois. He graduated from Rock Island High School and Augustana College. After graduating from Augustana in 1932, he went to the University of Chicago for his Ph.D.

== Career ==
Olson was recruited to work for the DuPont Company in Baltimore, Maryland, at the Krebs Pigment and Color plant as a chemist/physicist for work on the white pigment titanium dioxide.

During World War II, an effort was underway to develop electrical components for radar. The key material needed in both paint research and electronics was pure silicon. His research at DuPont pinpointed a way to purify the element, and he grew the first crystal of hyper-pure silicon. As a result, DuPont started a silicon production program, which in the following years led to use of available silicon for circuits and semiconductors. The predominant use of silicon for these components and chips lead to the area around San Jose, California, to be nicknamed the "Silicon Valley".

In 1954 U.S. patent 2845386A was awarded to Olson for the production of metals like titanium by reduction of the metal oxide by a molten salt reducing agent in a specific gravity apparatus.

Dr. Olson died on May 16, 2011, at the age of 99.
