= Andrea Talentino =

American political scientist and academic administrator

9th President of Augustana College
- Incumbent
- Assumed office July 1, 2022
- Preceded by: Steve Bahls

Personal details
- Born: January 5, 1968 (age 57); Binghamton, New York, U.S.
- Education: Yale University; University of California, Los Angeles; Norwich University

Andrea Kathryn Talentino (born January 5, 1968) is an American political scientist and academic administrator serving as the ninth president of Augustana College since 2022.

== Early life and education ==
Talentino was born on January 5, 1968, in Binghamton, New York. She completed a B.A. in political science at Yale College. She earned an MA in 1994 and a PhD in 1998 in political science at the University of California, Los Angeles. Her dissertation was titled, Intervention After the Cold War: The Motivations and Goals of Contemporary Multilateral Intervention and she was advised by Richard Rosecrance.

== Academic career ==
Talentino completed a postdoctoral fellowship at the Princeton School of Public and International Affairs in the spring of 1999.

From 1999 to 2005, Talentino was an assistant professor in the department of political science at Tulane University. She joined Drew University in 2008 as the chair of the political science department. She became the associate dean for curriculum and faculty development in 2011. From 2012 to 2017, Talentino was dean of the college of liberal arts at Norwich University, during which time she completed a M.B.A. with a concentration in organizational leadership. She joined Nazareth University in 2017 as its vice president for academic affairs. She was promoted to provost in 2020.

=== President of Augustana College ===
On July 1, 2022, Talentino became the ninth president of Augustana College in Rock Island, Illinois, succeeding Steve Bahls. She is its first female president.

== Selected works ==
- Talentino, Andrea Kathryn (2005). Military Intervention After the Cold War: The Evolution of Theory and Practice. Ohio University Press. ISBN 978-0-89680-245-2.
- Chatziefstathiou, Dikaia; Talentino, Andrea Kathryn, eds. (2015). Sporting Boundaries, Sporting Events and Commodification. Inter-Disciplinary Press. ISBN 978-1-84888-388-8.
