= J. E. Wallace Wallin =

American Psychologist

- Born: January 21, 1876; Page County, Iowa
- Died: August 5, 1969 (aged 93)
- Education: Augustana College, Yale University
- Scientific career
- Fields: Psychologist
- Doctoral advisor: Edward W. Scripture

John Edward Wallace Wallin (January 21, 1876 – August 5, 1969) was an American psychologist and an early proponent of educational services for the mentally handicapped. Wallin wrote more than 30 books and published over 300 articles. He established several psychology clinics and was a noted professor, author and mental health director for a state board of education. Wallin also led the founding of the American Association of Clinical Psychologists, which later became Division 12 of the American Psychological Association (APA).

== Early life ==
Wallin was born in Page County, Iowa. His parents were immigrants from Sweden. Wallin's father was a farmer, merchant, bank director and school board president at various points in his life. Wallin earned an undergraduate degree from Augustana College (Illinois) in 1897. He completed a PhD at Yale University in 1901. He then served as an assistant to G. Stanley Hall at Clark University.

== Career ==
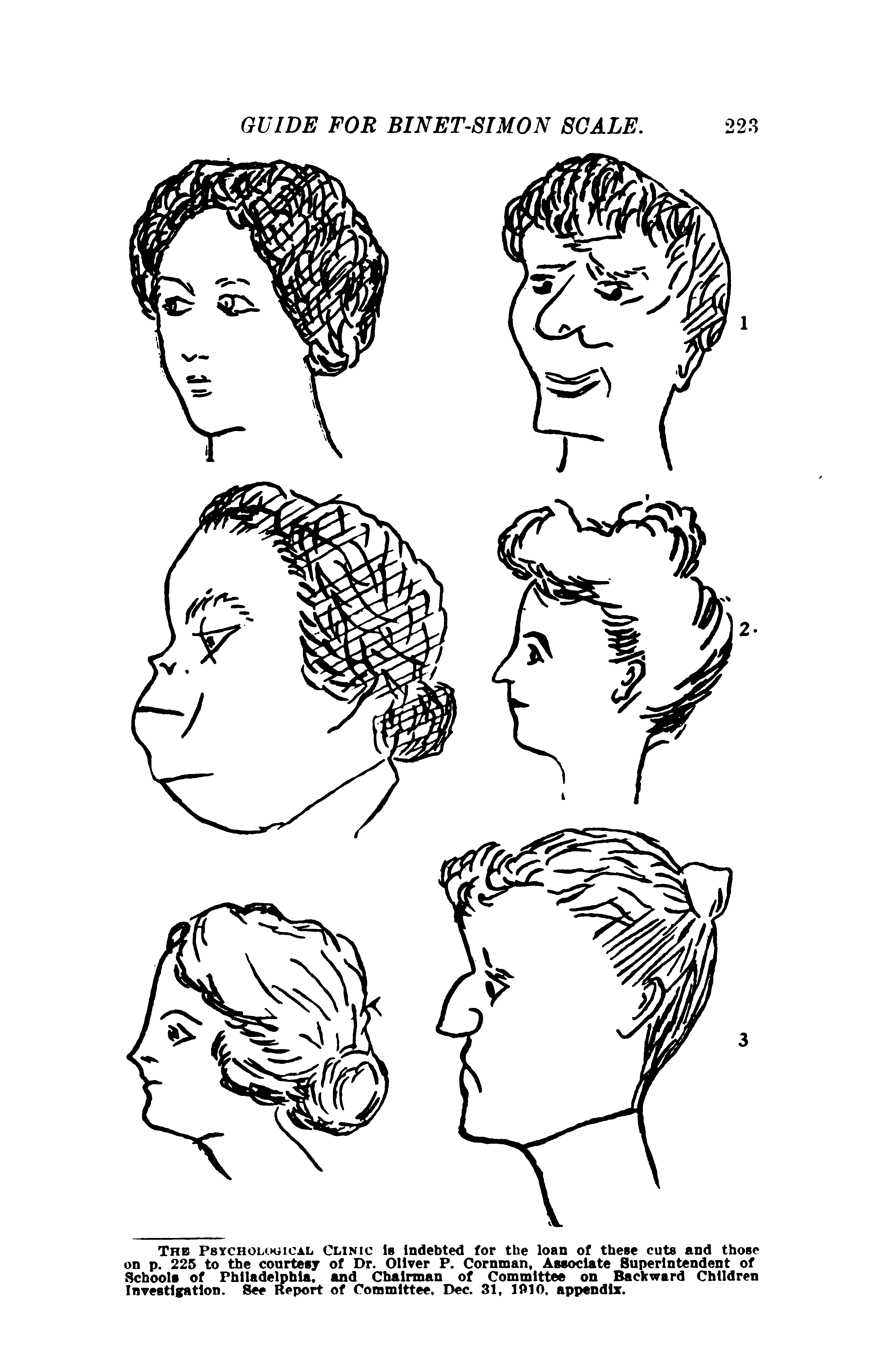
Reproduction of an item from the 1908 Binet-Simon intelligence scale, showing three pairs of pictures, about which the tested child was asked, "Which of these two faces is the prettier?" The drawings were reproduced in the article "A Practical Guide for Administering the Binet-Simon Scale for Measuring Intelligence" by J. W. Wallace Wallin in the March 1911 issue of the journal The Psychological Clinic (volume 5 number 1)

Wallin accepted several academic positions after completing his training. He worked briefly at the Vineland Training School and then established a psychology clinic at the New Jersey Village for Epileptics (now the New Jersey Neuropsychiatric Institute). That position only lasted eight months, as Wallin felt that he was never treated like a professional by the facility's superintendent. His experiences at the institute may have inspired his involvement with professional organizations shortly thereafter. He left for the University of Pittsburgh to establish one of the first psychoeducational clinics in the nation.

In 1915 Wallin co-authored (with Guy Montrose Whipple) a resolution passed by the American Psychological Association (APA); the resolution, which discouraged psychological testing by unqualified individuals, was the first practice-related position statement issued by the APA. In 1917, led a group of several psychologists to found the American Association of Clinical Psychologists (AACP), and served as the organization's first president. In 1919, the AACP merged, as a "Section on Clinical Psychology," into the better-established American Psychological Association (APA) The alliance did not last, however. Few members of the old AACP joined the APA and many member of the APA were unhappy about the older "scientific" organization expending its resources on managing issues in "applied" psychology. By 1925 the Clinical Section was abandoned, and applied psychologists regrouped in a series of new regional and national entities. It would not be until after World War II that the APA would create a divisional structure that enabled clinical psychology to enter it again.

After establishing educational psychology services for the public school systems in St. Louis and Baltimore, Wallin directed the Division of Special Education and Mental Hygiene with the Delaware State Board of Education. He served as a visiting professor at Upsala College in East Orange, New Jersey.

Beginning early in his career at Vineland, Wallin took great interest in intelligence testing and education of the developmentally disabled. He cautioned against overemphasis on the intelligence quotient (IQ) that had been popularized by Lewis Terman. Wallin noted that there was considerable overlap in IQ between individuals of various intelligence categories. He feared that isolated interpretation of an IQ test might lead to finding faults in an otherwise normal individual.

== Personal ==
In 1913, Wallin married Francis Geraldine Tinsley. They had two children. Virginia Stanton Wallin Obrinski was born in 1915 and became a psychologist. Geraldine Tinsley Wallin Sickler was born in 1919. Geraldine graduated with a bachelor's degree from Duke University. After his younger daughter was killed in a 1959 traffic collision, Wallin established the Geraldine Wallin Sickler Award at Augustana College. The award provides monetary assistance for outstanding senior psychology students to pursue graduate education.

== Later life ==
In 1955, Wallin reflected on his career in his autobiographical work The Odyssey of a Psychologist. Wallin died on August 5, 1969.

== Legacy ==
Several sources have commented on Wallin's personality. In describing the interpersonal issues that Wallin had at the New Jersey State Village for Epileptics, Bruce Hermann said that Wallin was "prickly to be sure and quick to take professional offense." Author Leila Zenderland said, "While his writings were significant in questioning the overstatements of other testers, Wallin largely remained an isolated maverick." Indeed, in a letter to H.H. Goddard, Wallin disclosed that he had lost a position because he was said to be "a difficult man to get along with."

The Council for Exceptional Children gives the J. E. Wallace Wallin Lifetime Achievement Award to "an individual who has made continued and sustained contributions to the education of children and youth with exceptionalities."

== Awards and honors ==
- Who's Who Among North American Authors (1921)
- Meritorious Service Award, Augustana College (1955)

== Selected works ==
- Wallin, J. E. Wallace (1905). Optical Illusions of Reversible Perspective. Stanton, Iowa: The Stanton Call Press.
- Wallin, J. E. Wallace (1920). Problems of Subnormality. New York: World Book Company.
- Wallin, J. E. Wallace (1924). The Education of Handicapped Children. Boston: Houghton Mifflin Company.
- Wallin, J. E. Wallace (1935). Personality Maladjustments and Mental Hygiene. New York: McGraw-Hill Book Company.
- Wallin, J. E. Wallace (1939). Minor Mental Maladjustments in Normal People. Durham, North Carolina: Duke University Press.
- Wallin, J. E. Wallace (1949). Children With Mental and Physical Handicaps. New York: Prentice-Hall.
