= Service fraternities and sororities =

Fraternal public service organizations

Service fraternity or service sorority may refer to any fraternal public-service organization, whether college or community-based. However, in Canada and the United States, the term "fraternity" is typically used to refer to fraternal student societies.

In the context of the North American student fraternity and sorority system, service fraternities and service sororities comprise a type of organization whose primary purpose is community service. Members of these organizations are not restricted from joining other types of fraternities. This may be contrasted with professional fraternities, whose primary purpose is to promote the interests of a particular profession, and general or social fraternities, whose primary purposes are generally aimed towards some other aspect, such as the development of character, friendship, leadership, or literary ability.

Some general fraternities and their chapters, especially members of the National Pan-Hellenic Council, emphasize the service aspects of their activities; however classification as a strictly service organization has legal meaning in regard to Title IX. Service fraternities, like professional fraternities and honor societies must be open to members of both genders since they do not have an exemption from Title IX similar to the one given in section (A)(6)(a) for social fraternities and sororities.

== Collegiate service fraternities and sororities ==
Organization	Charter date and range	Founding location	Type	Scope	Affiliation	Active chapters	Status	Ref.
Alpha Phi Omega	December 16, 1925	Lafayette College	Coed fraternity	International	PFA	621	Active	
Alpha Mu Sigma		University of Mary Washington	Coed sorority	Local	Independent	1	Active	
Alpha Tau Mu	September 2, 2009	Tuskegee University	African American coed fraternity	Regional	Independent	2	Active	
Beta Nu Theta	2017	University of North Carolina at Chapel Hill	African American coed fraternity	Local	Independent	1	Active	
Chi Alpha Phi	1979	Lincoln University	African American coed fraternity	National	Independent		Active	(Note: Accepts both college and community members.)
Delta Chi Gamma	May 2014	Virginia Tech	Sorority	Local	Independent	1	Active	
Delta Gamma Chi	2022	Penn State World Campus	Sorority	National (virtual)	Independent	1	Active	
Delta Nu Zeta	December 12, 2003	Florida State University	Sorority	Regional	Independent	2	Active	
Epsilon Sigma Alpha	1929	Jacksonville, Florida	Coed sorority	International	Independent	23	Active	(Note: Also has a larger non-collegiate division.)
Epsilon Tau Pi	April 28, 1999	University of Dayton	Coed fraternity for Eagle Scouts	National	Independent	8	Active	
Gamma Beta Chi	November 15, 2002	Fort Lauderdale, Florida	African American fraternity	National	Independent	5	Active	
Gamma Pi Alpha	November 12, 1994	Tuskegee University	African American sorority	Local	Independent	1	Active	
Gamma Sigma Sigma	October 12, 1952	New York City, New York	Coed sorority	National	Independent	53	Active	
Kappa Delta Tau	March 11, 1963	Eastern Kentucky University	Sorority	Local	Independent	1	Active	
Lambda Delta Sigma	1919	Concordia College	Sorority	Local	Independent	1	Active	(Note: Originally formed as a social sorority.)
Nu Alpha Nu	2006	Alabama State University	African American fraternity	Local	Independent	1	Active	
Mu Sigma Pi	April 21, 2022	York University	Fraternity	Local	independent	1	Active	
Nu Alpha Omicron	2012	Alabama State University	African American sorority	Local	Independent	1	Active	
Omega Delta Sigma	1999	University of Florida	Veterans fraternity	National	Independent	15	Active	
Omega Phi Alpha	June 15, 1967	Bowling Green State University	Coed sorority	National	Independent	29	Active	(Note: Formed in 1953 with the assistance of brothers of the Zeta Kappa chapter of Alpha Phi Omega, but did not register as a national group until 1967 when three independent chapters merged. Member was limited to former Girl Scouts and Campfire Girls until 1958.)
Phi Delta	2006	Truman State University	Sorority	Local	Independent	1	Active	
Rho Pi Alpha	1993	Tuskegee University	Fraternity	Local	Independent	1	Active	
Tau Beta Sigma	March 26, 1946	Oklahoma State University	Coed sorority	National	Independent	244	Active	
Upsilon Phi Upsilon	March 31, 1990	Southern University	African American fraternity	National	Independent	17	Active	
Zeta Mu Phi		Penn State World Campus	Sorority	National (virtual)	Independent	0	Inactive	
Zeta Theta Pi	2007	Central Michigan University	Sorority	Regional	Independent	2	Active	

== Non-collegiate service fraternities and sororities ==
Organization	Charter date and range	Founding location	Type	Scope	Affiliation	Active chapters	Status	Ref.
Alpha Pi Chi	January 7, 1963	Chicago, Illinois	African American sorority	National	Independent	40+	Active	(Note: Its founders were all associated with Alpha Gamma Chi. Members are mostly African American professionals.)
Chi Alpha Phi	1979	Lincoln University	Coed African American fraternity	National	Independent		Active	(Note: Accepts both college and community members.)
Chi Gamma Kappa	January 22, 2017	Georgia	African American fraternity	Regional	Independent		Active	(Note: Members must be enrolled in college, have a college degree, or professional certification in her chosen career and live in Georgia, Alabama, Florida, Tennessee, Mississippi, Louisiana, North Carolina or South Carolina)
Delta Rho	July 1, 2004	Orlando, Florida	African American sorority	National	Independent	3	Active	(Note: Members must be at least 25 years old. Most members are professional women.)
Delta Theta Tau	October 16, 1903	Muncie, Indiana	Sorority	National	Independent	72	Active	
Epsilon Sigma Alpha	1929	Jacksonville, Florida	Coed sorority	International	Independent	800+	Active	(Note: Also has a collegiate division.)
Gamma Pi Chi	July 16, 2016	Georgia	African American professional sorority	Regional	Independent	2	Active	(Note: Members must be enrolled in college, have a college degree, or professional certification in her chosen career and live in Georgia, Alabama, Florida, Tennessee, Mississippi, Louisiana, North Carolina or South Carolina)
Psi Psi Psi	October 2, 1919	Indianapolis	Sorority for Delta Delta Delta mothers	International	Independent	8	Active	
Tau Gamma Delta	1942	Lewis Business College	Sorority	National	Independent	13	Active	

== See also ==
- College fraternities and sororities
- Fraternity
- List of general fraternities
- List of social fraternities
- List of social sororities and women's fraternities
- List of African-American fraternities and sororities
