= Up 'til Dawn =

St. Jude Children's Research Hospital fundraiser

Logo

Up 'til Dawn is a nationwide student-led, student-run program in which college students raise funds for and awareness of St. Jude Children's Research Hospital. Though called Up 'til Dawn, the program itself usually takes place throughout the academic year and provides opportunities in leadership for students, allowing them to gain valuable work experience by organizing and participating in fund-raising activities. The program encourages faculty, staff and surrounding community residents to participate in the arranged fund-raising campaigns and awareness days.

Up 'til Dawn's finale event attempts to unite the entire campus and surrounding community to acknowledge their achievements and honor patients at St. Jude, an event at which students stay "Up 'til Dawn," using the motto "Fight the yawn-stay awake to cure childhood cancer." The students' motto is "cancer doesn't sleep, so neither should we." The program is called "Up 'til Dawn" to symbolize the countless nights that parents stay up with their sick children. The Up 'til Dawn organization is hosted by more than 180 colleges nationwide.
