= Psi Psi Psi =

North American sorority

- ΨΨΨ
- Psi Psi Psi membership badge
- Founded: October 2, 1914; 112 years ago Indianapolis, Indiana, US
- Type: Service
- Affiliation: Independent
- Status: Active
- Emphasis: Mothers of Tri Delta members
- Scope: North America
- Motto: "An effort made for the happiness of others lifts us above ourselves"
- Colors: Green, Gold and Violet
- Flower: Violet
- Jewel: Pearl
- Publication: TRIAD
- Philanthropy: Delta Delta Delta
- Chapters: 10 (active)
- Nickname: Tri Psi
- Headquarters: United States
- Website: tripsisorority.com/home

Psi Psi Psi (ΨΨΨ), also known as Tri Psi, is a North American sorority for the mothers of members of the collegiate sorority Delta Delta Delta. Tri Psi was established in 1914. It was the first, and remains the only, sorority for the mothers of sorority members.

== History ==
In 1914, the Delta Lambda chapter of Delta Delta Delta (Tri Delta) was established at Butler University in Indianapolis, Indiana. Helen Tichenor, a Tri Delta alumna and mother of a member of the Delta Lambda chapter, invited the other mothers to her home to discuss a forming mother's group. The first meeting was held on October 2, 1914, with eleven mothers in attendance. They elected officers and selected the name Delta Lambda Mothers. Their selected the colors were green and gold and the chrysanthemum as their flower (later changed to the violet).

The founders of Delta Lambda Mothers were:

- Mrs. Thomas Bowser
- Mrs. Henry D. Breadheft
- Mrs. Arthor Curme
- Mrs. George L. Davis
- Mrs. Orville M. Gawne
- Mrs. James Graham
- Mrs. Florence A. Harris
- Mrs. C. F. Politt
- Mrs. James A. Seward
- Helen Tichnor (Mrs. William Tichenor)
- Mrs. Robert F. Webb

When Edith Webb, the first president of the Delta Lambda chapter and daughter of a Delta Lambda Mothers founder, graduated from college. Webb became the secretary of Ida Shaw Martin, a founder of Tri Delta. When Martin learned about the mother's group from Webb, she contacted its members and proposed that they form a Greek letter sorority. The Delta Lambda Mothers agreed provided Martin would be their advisor and guide.

Martin renamed the group Psi Psi Psi (Tri Psi), changed its colors and flower, and designed its badge. She also wrote its constitution and ritual, presented in July 1916. In addition, Martin served as the executive secretary of Tri Psi during it first several years. As a result, Ida Shaw Martin is considered the founder of Psi Psi Psi.

The purpose of Tri Psi is to be an ally to Delta Delta Delta and its members It also nurtures the mother-daughter relationship and creates friendships between Tri Delta mothers. It was the first, and remains the only, sorority for the mothers sorority members. Martin said:

I thoroughly believe in Tri Psi, for a mother is still a girl’s best friend and no barrier should be raised between them. Tri Psi, I believe, can link the Delta Delta Delta daughter more closely to the Tri Psi mother, as the latter follows the girl’s course through college with a complete understanding.

The first members of Tri Psi were initiated as the Alpha chapter in Indianapolis in 1916. Beta chapter was chartered in Greencastle, Indiana in 1917. This was followed by Gamma chapter in Franklin, Indiana in 1920. In 1920, Martin suggested that Tri Psi become a national sorority. Membership was opened to all mothers of Tri Delts at this time. Tri Psi held its first national convention at the Lincoln Hotel in Indianapolis, on May 20, 1920, with fifty members attending. All three chapters had representatives at the convention. The 1921 convention was held in the Christian Church of Franklin, Indiana.

Early activities of the sorority included hosting annual Violet Luncheons that honored graduating Tri Delta seniors. By 1928, the membership of the Alpha chapter had grown from its original eleven to 86. The sorority started its magazine, The Triad, in June 1928. Tri Psi became an international sorority in 1933 with the establishment of the Canada Alpha chapter in Toronto.

By October 1935, Tri Psi had chartered eighteen chapters and initiated 923 members. There were fifty active chapters in 1970. In 1987, the sorority had initiated 1,700 members.

== Symbols ==
Martin designed the Psi Psi Psi badge to show its connection to Tri Delta. The gold badge is shaped like pelvic bones, represented by two inward facing half circles. The half-circles surround a line of three triangles, the shape of the Greek letter Delta (Δ). Each triangle features the Greek letter Psi (Ψ). There is a pearl at the top that represents the member's Tri Delta daughter. Additional pearls are added if the member has multiple Tri Delta daughters. An early publication noted, "A loving daughter is a pearl of great price."

Tri Psi's flower is the violet, chosen by Martin because of the legend that the violet is the "mother" of the pansy, which is the flower of Tri Delta. Tri Psi's colors are green, gold, and violet. Its jewel is the pearl. Its motto is "An effort made for the happiness of others lifts us above ourselves".

By the 1930s, the sorority had published the Tri Psi Pamphlet which included eight official sorority songs, including "Tri Psi Violet" and "Tri Psi Believe Me". The national Tri Psi song is "Tri Psi to You". The sorority also has an official "Tri Psi Poem", written by Charles Hougham. The sorority's magazine is TRIAD, published annually in July.

== Activities ==
Tri Psi supports the activities of Delta Delta Delta, providing both financial contributions and service hours for Tri Delta chapters. Its ongoing national program is the Tri Psi Scholarship, awarded annually to a rising junior Tri Delts. This program was established in 1952. Tri Delta chapters nominate a member for consideration for the $1,500 scholarships. The Tri Psi International Scholarship Fund is held by the related nonprofit organization, the Tri Delta Foundation, based in Dallas, Texas. The sorority has awarded $507,000 in scholarships as of 2023.

In 1957, Tri Psi established a Memorial Loan Fund that provides low-interest loans to Tri Delts enrolled in graduate studies. The first loan was issued in 1960.

Tri Psi holds a bi-annual national convention that is open to all of its members. The sorority is also working to digitize and preserve its history into an online archive through its Tri Psi Digitization Project.

== Membership ==
Membership in the sorority is open to mothers, step-mothers, foster members, or anyone acting in the capacity of a mother of a Tri Delta member. At least ten potential members are required to establish a Tri Psi chapter. Membership is for the member's lifetime, extending beyond their child's time in college.

At the national convention in 1975, the husbands of Tri Psi members were recognized as affiliate members called Tri Psicles.

== Governance ==
A governing council of twelve officers oversees Tri Psi at the national level. Its officers and council members are elected during national conventions.

== Chapters ==
Chapters of Tri Psi are city-based, rather than being associated with a specific Tri Delta chapter. As of 2024, there are ten active chapters located in the United States and Canada.

== See also ==
- Service fraternities and sororities
