= American Lebanese Syrian Associated Charities =

Nonprofit organization that raises funds for St. Jude Children's Research Hospital

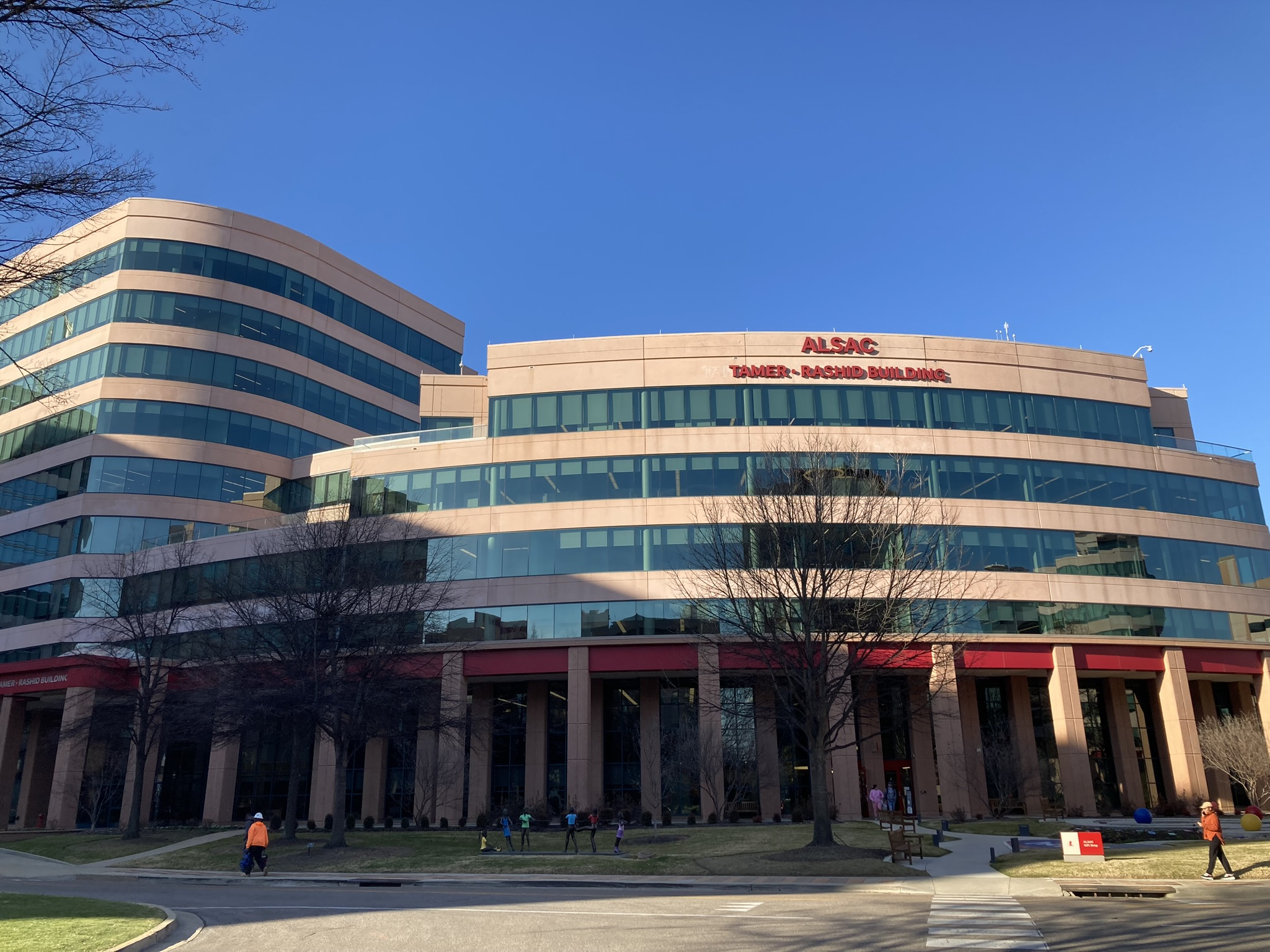
- ALSAC's headquarters is the Tamer-Rashid building on the St. Jude campus.
- Abbreviation: ALSAC
- Founder: Danny Thomas
- Founded at: Indianapolis, Indiana, United States
- Type: Nonprofit
- Tax ID no.: 35-1044585
- Purpose: Fundraising for and awareness of St. Jude Children's Research Hospital
- Location: Memphis, Tennessee, United States
- Coordinates: 35.154963°N 90.041829°W
- CEO: Ike Anand
- Revenue: $2.69 billion (2023)
- Expenses: $2.20 billion (2023)
- Staff: 2,109 (2023)
- Website: stjude.org

The American Lebanese Syrian Associated Charities (ALSAC) is an American nonprofit organization. Founded by entertainer Danny Thomas in 1957, its purpose is exclusively to raise funds for and awareness of St. Jude Children's Research Hospital. ALSAC is the largest healthcare-related charity in the United States and raises 89% of St. Jude's annual operating budget from private donors.

The ALSAC headquarters is located in Memphis, Tennessee. ALSAC also has over 30 local fundraising offices located in cities throughout the United States that hold over 30,000 fundraising events annually. In 2025, the organization promoted Ike Anand to become its President and Chief Executive Officer (CEO). Anand is the seventh President and CEO and followed Richard Shadyac Jr., who previously held these roles since 2009.

== Purpose and activities ==
As of 2025, St. Jude Children's Research Hospital costs more than $2 billion per year to run, and donations provide an estimated 89% of those funds. Only 6% of the money to operate the hospital comes from insurance recoveries and 5% comes from grants.

To cover these costs, ALSAC raises funds for the hospital through its more than 30,000 fund-raising activities. Notable fund-raising programs for the hospital include the FedEx St. Jude Classic, now the FedEx St. Jude Championship, which is a PGA Tour event, Up 'til Dawn, and the St. Jude Memphis Marathon Weekend. Other fund-raising programs include direct mailings, radiothons, and television marketing.

One of ALSAC's most successful fund-raising efforts has been the St. Jude Dream Home Giveaway. The giveaway allows contest entrants to reserve tickets for $100 each to qualify to win homes valued up to $775,000. The Dream Home Giveaway is conducted in cities within the United States.

In November 2004, ALSAC launched the inaugural St. Jude Thanks and Giving campaign which encourages consumers to help raise funds at participating retailers by adding a donation at checkout or by purchasing specialty items to benefit St. Jude. The campaign has been is supported by network television spots, advertisements in major publications, featured content on The Today Show, and movie trailers.

St. Jude has been named one of two International Philanthropic Projects of Epsilon Sigma Alpha International, a women's service sorority. Since 1972, ESA has raised more than $200 million for St. Jude.

In September 2021, Inspiration4 became the first crewed orbital mission with no professional astronauts on board. The mission raised more than $240 million for St. Jude, which was its sole charitable beneficiary, and the crew included a stuffed puppy toy modeled after two service dogs at St. Jude.

From 2021 to 2022, a large plush duck toy, nicknamed "Mr. Vanderquack", was used to fundraise for St. Jude. Groups of volunteers carried the duck through all fifty of the United States. In 2022, the convoy raised over $130,000 for St. Jude.

ALSAC raised $2.6 billion in 2024.

== Awards ==
In 2024, ALSAC won the General Excellence category for the Best Workplaces for Innovators by Fast Company.

== See also ==
- St. Jude Children's Research Hospital
