= Delta Delta Delta =

North American collegiate women's fraternity

- ΔΔΔ
- Founded: November 27, 1888; 137 years ago Boston University
- Type: Social
- Affiliation: NPC
- Status: Active
- Scope: International
- Motto: Asfalos Agapomen Allaylas "Let us steadfastly love one another"
- Member badge
- Colors: Silver, Gold, and Cerulean Blue
- Symbol: Stars and crescent
- Flower: Pansy
- Tree: Pine
- Jewel: Pearl
- Mascot: Dolphin
- Patron Greek deity: Poseidon
- Publication: The Trident
- Philanthropy: St. Jude Children's Research Hospital
- Chapters: 141
- Members: 17,000 active 316,000+ lifetime
- Nickname: Tri Delta
- Headquarters: 14951 North Dallas Parkway Suite 500; Dallas, Texas; United States
- Website: tridelta.org

Delta Delta Delta (ΔΔΔ), also known as Tri Delta, is an international collegiate women's fraternity. It was founded on November 27, 1888 at Boston University in Boston, Massachusetts.

== History ==
Founders

Sarah Ida Shaw

Eleanor Dorcas Pond

Florence Isabelle Stewart

Isabel Morgan Breed

Delta Delta Delta was founded by Sarah Ida Shaw, Eleanor Dorcas Pond, Florence Isabelle Stewart, and Isabel Morgan Breed at Boston University. Three women's fraternities were already represented at Boston University (Kappa Kappa Gamma, Gamma Phi Beta, and Alpha Phi). Shaw enlisted the help of Dorcas Pond, stating, "Let us found a society that shall be kind alike to all and think more of a girl's inner self and character than of her personal appearance."

The two started a new national fraternity in 1888. Later Shaw wrote, "...They were working for a principle, and it never occurred to them that there could be such a thing as failure. Earnestness of purpose, energy and enthusiasm had brought them both success in college and why should not these same qualities bring assurance of good fortune to the new venture."

Shaw and Pond wrote the rituals and constitution, designed the emblems, and mutually decided on the name. Pond suggested a triple letter, while Shaw chose the actual letter, developing Greek mottos and passwords. Inspiration came from Ancient Egypt, Greek mythology, Hindu, and astronomy, reflecting Shaw's varied interests.

On October 2, 1914, Shaw formed Psi Psi Psi or Tri Psi, a sorority for the mothers of Delta Delta Delta members.

== Symbols ==
Tri Delta's colors and three deltas may be used in place of the official crest.

The Delta Delta Delta coat of arms consists of a quartered shield, first and fourth quarters in blue with a silver trident on each, second and third quarters in gold with green pine tree on each. The sorority crest is placed above the shield and consists of a torse with six folds in alternating gold and blue, from which a white, gold and blue pansy rises. Below the shield, the motto Asfalos Agapomen Allaylas is inscribed on a scroll.

The fraternity's motto is Asfalos Agapomen Allaylas or "Let us steadfastly love one another". The Greek alphabet letters Delta Delta Delta (ΔΔΔ) are the official symbols. The dolphin is recognized as an additional symbol as it was considered to be a good omen by the ancient Greeks. The colors of Tri Delta are silver, gold, and cerulean blue. Its jewel is the pearl. Its flower is the pansy. The pine tree is its official tree. Its publication is The Trident, the first edition of which was published in November 1891 at Boston University. Other publications have included a secret quarterly magazine called the Triton and a secret Annual called the Trireme.

An alternative, modernized logo makes use of Tri Delta's colors and symbols for branding and marketing.

=== Badge ===
Tri Delta's official member badge is the diamond and pearl-studded, gold stars and crescent pin, consisting of three golden stars and a crown set with pearls, within a gold crescent that bears the Greek letters ΔΔΔ in black enamel. Its new members wear a new member pin, which is a green and silver enamel badge described as an "inverted Delta surrounded by three Deltas."

Tri Delta also has various circle pins to celebrate years since the member's initiation. Introduced in 2004, the Silver Circle Pin may be worn by members who have reached the 25-year anniversary of their initiation. It features the anniversary number engraved on the stars and crescent design. The Golden Circle Pin was originally created by Sarah Ida Shaw for the Circle Degree of Initiation, but its current usage to celebrate 50 years since initiation dates to 1962. This pin consists of three deltas made of gold inside a golden circle, surrounded by six spherical triangles in blue. The Diamond Circle Pin honors members who have served for 75 years with the fraternity. While the design is alike to the Golden Circle Pin, this token features a diamond in the center. This pin was introduced in the year 1996 and the first pin was awarded to Mary K. Wise of Butler University.

== Activities ==
The fraternity hosts annual conferences and conventions, varied leadership development programs, and mental health programs. Let's Talk Tri Delta is a podcast enabling members to hear directly from board members, experts, and other members on varying issues.

The Ginger Hicks Smith Museum and Archives is based out of Tri Delta's Executive Office in Dallas, showcasing the founding and development, and housing some of the organization's most precious historical items.

== Philanthropies ==
The fraternity offers scholarships and emergency grants to its collegiate members.

=== Philanthropy benefiting St. Jude Children ===
Many chapters observe "Sleighbell Day" on the first Tuesday of December, following the tradition of Sleighbell Luncheon, first held in the 1940s by 13 Southern California chapters to benefit a doctor researching blood diseases at Children's Hospital Los Angeles. In the early 1970s, a national survey established that Tri Delta chapters were interested in children, hospitals, and cancer. At the 1974 Tri Delta Convention, the three were combined to support children's cancer charities as the designated philanthropy.

In 1999, Tri Delta partnered with St. Jude Children's Research Hospital. St. Jude (through the fundraising branch, the American Lebanese Syrian Associated Charities) assists Tri Delta chapters in planning philanthropy events that benefit the children and subsidize research costs at St. Jude. Many chapters coordinate fundraising activities such as pancake breakfasts, called Delta House of Pancakes or DHOP, and football tailgates on their campuses each year. Since 1999, Tri Delta has raised more than $30 million for St. Jude. In 2002, Tri Deltas committed to raising $1 million to build a Teen Room at the St. Jude Hospital in Memphis, Tennessee, fulfilling the commitment in 2005. In July 2006, Tri Delta committed to raise $10 million in 10 years to build a new patient treatment floor focusing on brain tumor research at St. Jude, instead raising $10.4 million in 4 years. In 2010, a new philanthropic goal was announced to raise $15 million in 5 years. On February 1, 2014, it was announced that Tri Delta surpassed the $15 million goal in just 3.5 years. On July 4, 2014, Tri Delta announced a new philanthropic goal to raise $60 million over 10 years, the largest single commitment by a partner of St. Jude in the history of the hospital. Only three-and-a-half years into the 10 year commitment to raise $60 million, Tri Delta hit the halfway point and announced $30 million raised for St. Jude in January 2018.

==== Tri Delta Place at St. Jude ====
Their pledge funded the Tri Delta Place, St. Jude's only on-campus housing facility. It includes 64 hotel-style rooms and 36 suites. Tri Delta was also named the St. Jude partner of the year for 2014, making Tri Delta the first non-corporation to receive this honor. As of February 2018, Tri Delta has reached the halfway point of this commitment. Since 1999, Tri Delta members have raised more than $70 million to St. Jude. Tri delta continues every year to increase their philanthropy goals for St. Jude.

In addition to the national partnership, Tri Delta continues to raise money for local children's cancer charities, including two Canadian Hospitals, the Hospital for Sick Children in Toronto, Canada, the Children's Hospital of Eastern Ontario in Ottawa, Canada, and local children's cancer charities in various states.

Every year, chapters host a variety of events to raise money for these causes. This includes sporting events such as Greeks at Bat (an inter-fraternity baseball tournament) and Tri Delta Triple Play (kickball tournament), pancake breakfasts commonly named "Delta House of Pancakes," "Delta Diner," or "TriHOP", and spaghetti dinners. Every Tri Delta member also participates in "Sincerely Yours", an international writing campaign to raise money for St Jude. Other St. Jude specific philanthropic endeavors includes a Gold Level National Team participation in the St. Jude Walk/Run to End Childhood Cancer.

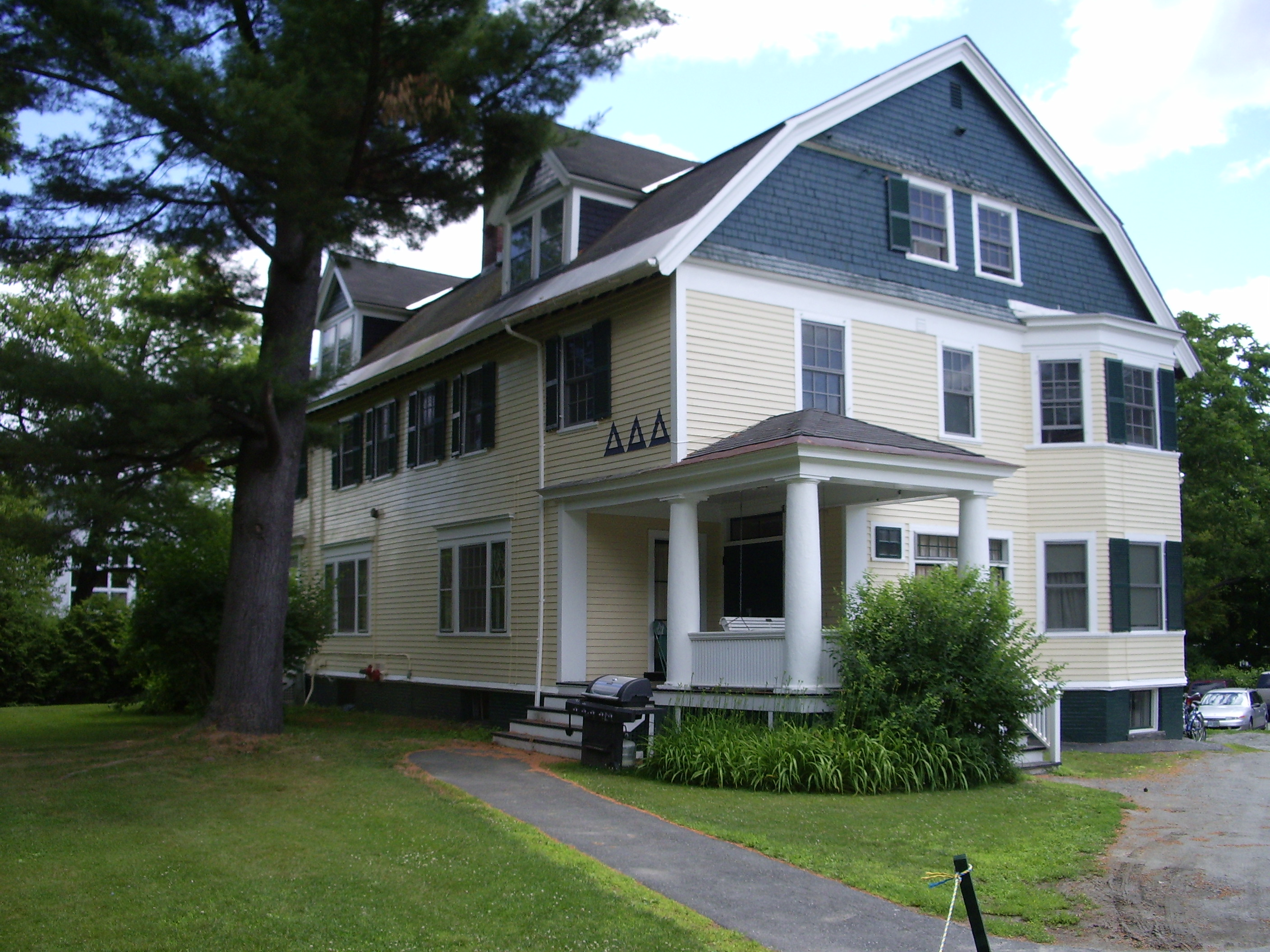
Delta Delta Delta at Dartmouth College

== Governance ==
Active members of each Tri Delta chapter may join a committee or be slated into an office in order to serve the organization and develop leadership skills. During the slating process, members adhere to the mantra "The Office Selects the Officer,” and undergo the process of determining the officer that is best suited for each office based on her skills and previous experience.

Each collegiate chapter president oversees chapter business, including membership in every team and committee. Each subsequent office is organized into one of the following teams, each headed by a vice president: Administration, Chapter Development, Finance, Public Relations, and Membership. Further committees, assistants, and chair positions are tailored to each chapter's specific needs. A new officer structure was introduced in 2020 which consists of the collegiate chapter president and vice presidents with responsibilities for operations, chapter programming and development, community relations, and membership experience. Each officer team consists of one vice president and a set of directors.

The National Housing Corporation who manage fraternity properties.

== Scandals ==
In 2014, the Arlington, Texas Police Department and various press reported how a team of two individuals "Pulled Off What May Be the Largest Sorority-Pin Heist in History." Between 2,000 and 5,000 of the diamond- and pearl-studded gold pins were taken from the national headquarters of Tri-Delta, with the police stating "the pins, which were set with precious and semi-precious stones, are worth about $1.5 million."

=== Chapter and individual misconduct ===
In 2009, the chapter at Miami University was suspended for hazing. Pledges were blindfolded and taken off-campus, where they were given an excessive amount of alcohol, causing some women to need medical attention after the incident.

In 2013 and 2014, sorority women from multiple chapters at the University of Alabama – including Delta Delta Delta, Pi Beta Phi, Chi Omega, Kappa Delta, Alpha Gamma Delta, Alpha Omicron Pi, and Phi Mu – alleged that either active members or some of their alumnae had prevented them from offering membership to black candidates because of their race. An anonymous Delta Delta Delta member spoke to the school newspaper, The Crimson White, stating: "To my knowledge, the president and the rush chair and our rush advisors [supported recruiting a black candidate], and if we had been able to pledge her, it would’ve been an honor. However, our [alumnae] stepped in and went over us and had her dropped. The only thing that kept her back was the color of her skin in Tri Delt. She would have been a dog fight between all the sororities if she were white.” Students held a campus march to integrate Greek life on campus, and following media and national outcry, the university held a second round of recruitment in hopes of offering membership to more women, including black women.

In 2017, the chapter at Indiana University was shut down following an investigation which found that chapter members were "involved in activities that do not represent our high standards or align with Tri Delta's purpose." Chapter members also "violated the chapter's previous probation terms." The national organization declined to specify further, but noted that the chapter had "been on probation for three consecutive semesters, and each time was asked to take responsibility for their actions. Each time ... the chapter chose to ignore advice and recommendations, sending a strong message that they had no intention of making positive change."

On January 20, 2019, a member of Tri Delta sorority at the University of Oklahoma was removed from the organization after posting a video in which her friend appears wearing blackface and saying a racial slur.

== In popular culture ==
- In the 1960s, G. William Domhoff, writing in Who Rules America?, listed Tri Delta as one of "the five or six sororities with nationwide prestige."
- In 1992, Saturday Night Live did a skit called "Delta Delta Delta: Finals Week" with Woody Harrelson and David Spade.
- Entertainment Weekly reported how Tri Delta was one of the top on-screen fraternities and sororities.
- TODAY (show) discussed Hoda Kotb's time at Tri Delta and how sisterhood should be taught to modern women, according to the co-host and Jenna Bush.

== See also ==
- List of social sororities and women's fraternities
