= Epsilon Sigma Alpha =

Collegiate and service organization

- ΕΣΑ
- Founded: 1929; 97 years ago Jacksonville, Texas, U.S.
- Type: Service
- Affiliation: Independent
- Status: Active
- Scope: International
- Motto: "All for one and one for all."
- Colors: Blue and Gold
- Flower: Jonquil
- Mascot: Giraffe
- Publication: The Journey
- Chapters: 24 collegiate, 775+ community-based
- Members: 10,000 lifetime
- Headquarters: 2580 East Harmony Road, Suite 301-11; Fort Collins, Colorado 80528; United States
- Website: www.epsilonsigmaalpha.org

Epsilon Sigma Alpha International (ΕΣΑ) is an International community and collegiate coeducational service organization. Established in 1929, Epsilon Sigma Alpha is a network of an estimated 10,000 members in over 1,000 community-based chapters, with coordinating organizations at state and international levels. ΕΣΑ also includes United States collegiate chapters that provide charitable service to their campuses and communities.

== History ==
Adelia Prichard of Oregon, a national president of Business and Professional Women's Clubs from 1923 to 1925, spearheaded the sorority's organization by proposing a national education and service sorority. In 1929, a group of community-oriented women in Jacksonville, Texas drafted an organization charter. With ten signatures, a national charter was issued to ΕΣΑ by the state of Missouri on February 11, 1930. The organization still functions under the original charter but is now incorporated in the state of Colorado.

Prichard was appointed the first national director and spearheaded the sorority's early growth. She also designed the sorority's badge and selected its flower and colors. She asked prominent women from around the United States to serve as members of the Founder's Chapter and to act as advisors.

The Founders Chapter included:

- Daisy Birchfield; a teacher
- Florence Crawford of Pueblo, Colorado
- Pearl Kinman
- Clara Leach
- Adelia Prichard of Portland, Oregon
- Mary Redfield Plummer of Chicago, Illinois
- Susan B. Rebhan of Cleveland, Ohio
- Florence M. Sterling of Houston, Texas
- Althea Terry, state president of the Business and Professional Clubs
- Phoebe Kerrick Warner, author and national chairman of the Rural Women's Clubs

The society's first national headquarters was located in Kansas City, Missouri, with a central states divisional office in St. Louis.

Director Sybil Murphy Flaherty organized the first national convention in 1938. Two chapters in Kansas City hosted the convention with about sixty delegates attending. At that time, delegates set up a national advisory council and elected Irene Copeland Lugland of Kansas City as the first national president.

During World War II, the national headquarters sponsored an “Empty Your Purse for Uncle Sam” campaign, one of the first nationally organized activities of the organization. In this door-to-door campaign, members collected metal for recycling into munitions. ΕΣΑ also collected books and other reading material for distribution to soldiers around the world. Local projects to assist the war effort were encouraged, and many chapters enrolled and sponsored Red Cross courses to combat local emergencies.

In 1948, a chapter was organized in Voorsburg, Netherlands. The name of the national advisory council was then changed to the international advisory council. Since then, Epsilon Sigma Alpha chapters have been organized in Germany, Guam, Denmark, Peru, Australia, Mexico, the Philippines, and Scotland.

In 1988 the first collegiate chapter was formed, on the campus of Ball State University.

The revised logo now used by many Epsilon Sigma Alpha chapters

== Symbols ==
The name Epsilon Sigma Alpha was chosen for its translation as "the pursuit of learning". Its motto is "All for one and one for all." Its badge is an open book with gold leaves and the Greek letters ΕΣΑ.

Epsilon Sigma Alpha's crest is a shield divided in the middle by a chevron containing six candles. Above the chevron to the left is an open book and, to the right is a jonquil. Below the chevron are the clasped hands of friendship. Above the shield is a lamp. Below it is a scroll bearing the Greek letters ΕΣΑ.

The sorority's colors are blue and gold; blue represents "fidelity to purpose and loyalty to ideals" and gold symbolizes "achievement and the everlasting life of...values". Its mascot is the giraffe. The yellow jonquil was chosen as the organization's floral as it is "rich in color, perfect in form." A member magazine, The Journey, formerly The Jonquil, is published twice yearly.

A streamlined logo was adopted during a brand refresh, consisting of three joined circles surrounding the three English letters representing the name of the society.

== Chapters ==
Epsilon Sigma Alpha has 24 collegiate chapters and more than 750 community-based chapters.

== Philanthropy ==
Chapters, both independently and jointly, conduct fundraising activities for charitable causes. As the care and expenses of handicapped children are a current ESA priority, the international Philanthropic Projects of Epsilon Sigma Alpha are St. Jude Children's Research Hospital and the Easter Seal Society. As of July 2006, ΕΣΑ had raised over 100 million dollars for St. Jude's Children's Research Hospital, meeting an organization goal for their 75th anniversary. As of 2019, the organization has helped raise more than $245 million in cash and pledges for the kids of St. Jude. ΕΣΑ has endowed the St. Jude Bone Marrow Transplant area in the hospital's Patient Care Center and the fourth floor of the ALSAC Tower.

Through their efforts to raise awareness and funds, ΕΣΑ helps support Easterseals and has been a supporter of Easterseals since 1982 when they were adopted as a second International Project. Since that date ΕΣΑ has raised over $6 million.

ΕΣΑ also encourages each local chapter to select and support local benevolent, charitable, or civic enterprises. ΕΣΑ activities on local levels may be jointly organized with men's fraternal organizations, including the Lions Clubs International. As a whole, the chapters have created an impressive record of service. Each year, members help raise millions of dollars for philanthropic projects and give an estimated 650,000 hours of personal service.

In addition, the ΕΣΑ Foundation supports education through an ongoing Scholarship/Endowment Program and provides grants to individuals involved in charitable service for children and adults.

== Notable members ==
- Adelia Prichard (Founders chapter), national president of Business and Professional Women's Clubs
- Susan B. Rebhan (Founders chapter), a State Supreme Court Judge
- Mary Redfield Plummer, lecturer on parliamentary law at Northwestern University
- Florence M. Sterling (Founders chapter), businesswoman, journalist and early feminist
- Phoebe Kerrick Warner (Founders chapter), women's club leader, lecturer, newspaper columnist, and political candidate

== See also ==
- Service fraternities and sororities
