= Haugaard =

Haugaard and Haugard are surnames of Danish and Norwegian origin. They are derived from the Old Norse word haugr which can be translated to mean hill, knoll, or mound. Notable people with these surnames include:

- Erik Christian Haugaard (1923–2009), American author
- Harald Haugaard, Danish fiddler, composer, and producer
- Jacob Haugaard (born 1952), Danish comedian, actor and politician
- Jakob Haugaard (born 1992), Danish footballer
- Kristian Haugaard (born 1991), Danish cyclist
- Lasse Haugaard Pedersen (born 1995), Danish politician
- Steven Haugaard (born 1956), American politician
- Svend Haugaard (1913–2003), Danish politician
- William Haugaard, New York State architect

== See also ==
- Hauge
- Haugan
- Haugen
- Haugland
