= 1958 in Norway =

- Centuries: 18th; 19th; 20th; 21st
- Decades: 1930s; 1940s; 1950s; 1960s; 1970s
- See also: List of years in Norway

Events in the year 1958 in Norway.

== Incumbents ==
- Monarch – Olav V.
- Prime Minister – Einar Gerhardsen (Labour Party)

== Events ==
- 8 January – Fire breaks out in the coastal steamer MS Erling Jarl while it is docked in Bodø. 14 people are killed.
- 22 June – Olav V is crowned as ruler of Norway in the Nidaros Cathedral.

=== Literature ===
- Harald Sverdrup, poet and children's writer, is awarded the Norwegian Critics Prize for Literature for his poetry, Sankt Elms ild.
- Astrid Tollefsen, poet, is awarded the Gyldendal's Endowment literature prize.

== Notable births ==
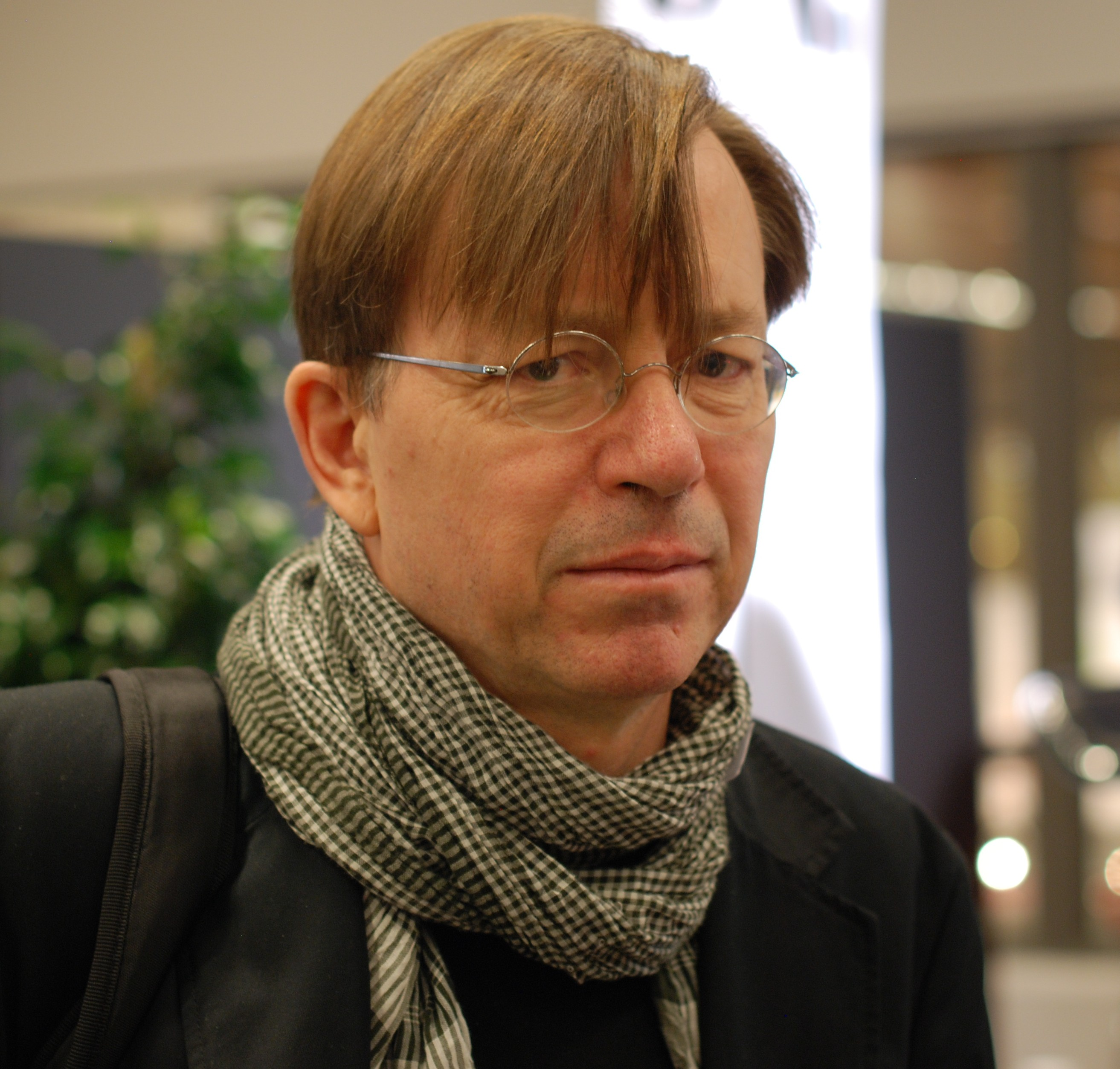
Steve Sem-Sandberg

- 28 January – Lisbeth Bodd, performance artist and theatre leader (died 2014).
- 4 February – Kjell Ola Dahl, writer
- 25 February – Eugene Ejike Obiora, died during police arrest (died 2006)
- 25 March – Øyvin Thon, orienteering competitor.
- 19 May – Sjur Loen, curler.
- 9 June – Inghill Johansen, writer.
- 19 June – Siri Bjerke, politician
- 28 July – Peter M. Haugan, scientist and Director of the Geophysical Institute, University of Bergen
- 3 August – Morten Berglia, orienteering competitor.
- 16 August – Steve Sem-Sandberg, journalist, novelist, and non-fiction writer.
- 26 August – Nils Carl Aspenberg, historian, author and businessperson
- 14 September - Morten Harket, writer, singer
- 24 September – Kim Haugen, actor.
- 7 October – Siv Nordrum, journalist and politician (died 2021).
- 23 October – Liv Signe Navarsete, politician and Minister
- 29 October – Torgrim Eggen, writer, musician.
- 30 October – Gunn Marit Helgesen, politician
- 23 November – Kjerstin Andersen, handball player.
- 24 November – Randi Hansen, pop singer
- 26 November – Rune Gokstad, comedian, actor, and radio and television host.
- 15 December – Christopher Hjort, typographer and graphical designer
- 29 December – Karin Singstad, handball player and Olympic medalist.

=== Full date missing ===
- Hilde Merete Aasheim, business executive.

== Notable deaths ==
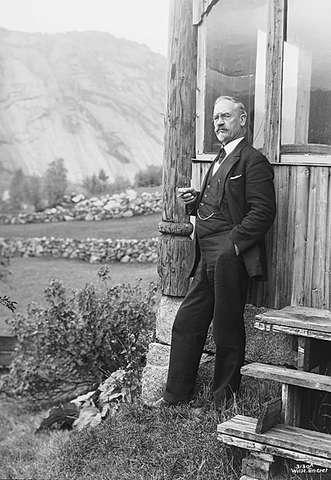
Lars Osa

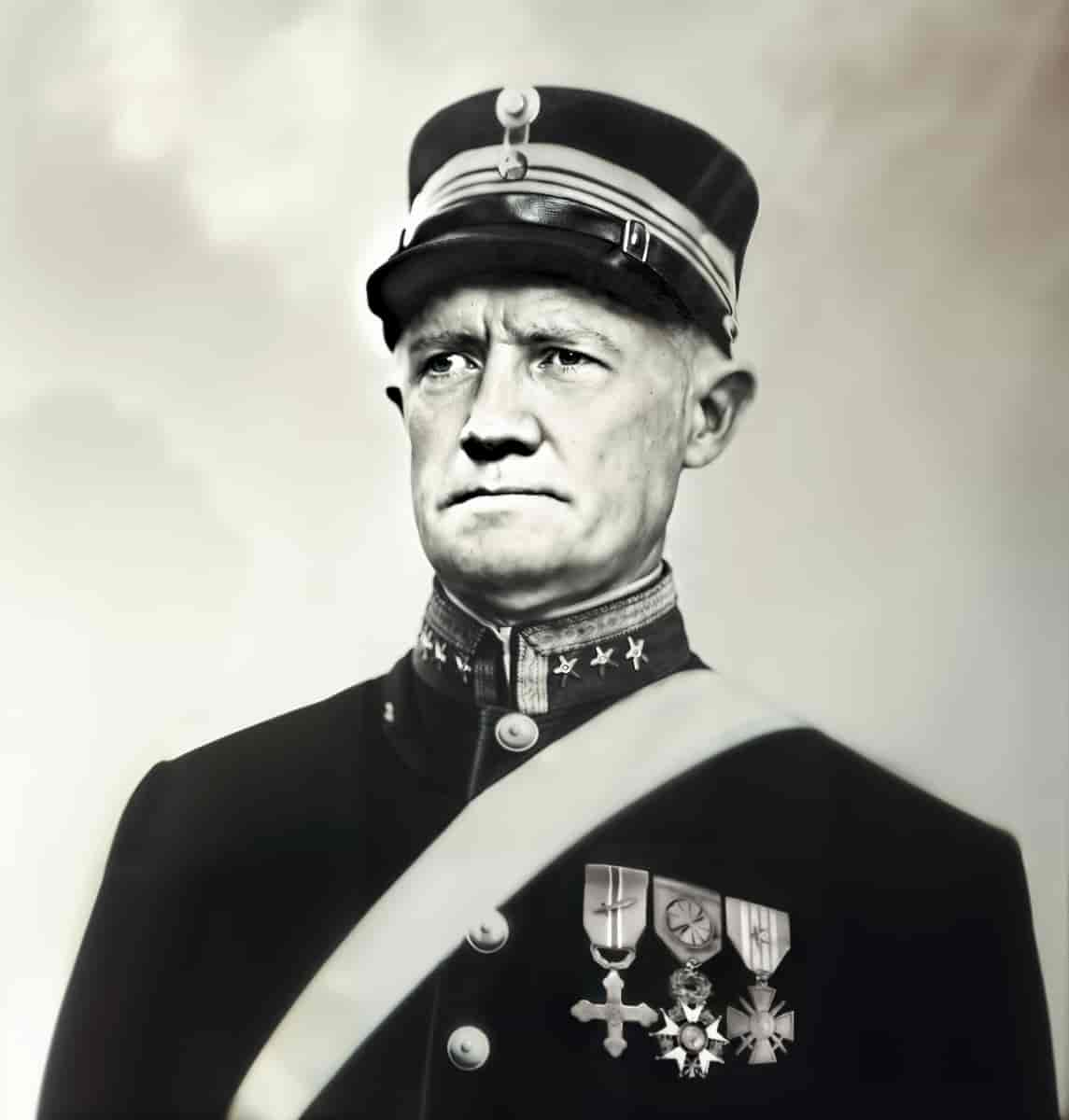
Birger Eriksen

- 21 January – Sven Nielsen, politician (born 1883)
- 29 January – Arnfinn Heje, sailor and Olympic gold medallist (born 1887)
- 29 January – Birger Øivind Meidell, politician (born 1882)
- 9 February – Lars Osa, artist (born 1860).
- 22 February – Thorleif Petersen, gymnast and Olympic gold medallist (born 1884)
- 25 February – Ole Sørensen, sailor and Olympic gold medallist (born 1883)
- 18 March – Sigve Lie, sailor and twice Olympic gold medallist (born 1906)
- 19 March – Helmer Hermandsen, rifle shooter and Olympic silver medallist (born 1871)
- 19 April – Andreas Strand, gymnast and Olympic silver medallist (born 1889)
- 21 May – Botten Soot, actress, singer, and dancer (born 1895).
- 20 June – Ingvald Haugen, trade unionist and politician (born 1894)
- 27 June – Ragna Wettergreen, stage and film actress (born 1864)
- 16 July – Birger Eriksen, military officer (born 1875)
- 18 August – Mikkel Sveinhaug, farmer and politician (born 1873)
- 2 September – Paul Tjøstolsen Sunde, politician (born 1896)
- 11 September – Dorthea Dahl, writer in America (born 1881)
- 16 September – Olav Berntsen Oksvik, politician and Minister (born 1887)
- 18 September – Olaf Gulbransson, artist, painter and designer (born 1873)
- 5 October – Nils Bertelsen, sailor and Olympic gold medallist (born 1879)
- 5 November – Gunnar Larsen, journalist, writer and translator (born 1900)
- 10 December – Hans Næss, sailor and Olympic gold medallist (born 1886)

=== Full date unknown ===
- Torgeir Anderssen-Rysst, politician and Minister (born 1888)
- Per Bakken, Nordic skier (born 1882)
- Theodor Bull, businessperson and genealogist (born 1870)
