= Haugli =

Haugli is a surname of Norwegian origin which also appears as a farm name. The name Haugli derives from the Old Norse word haugr which can be translated to mean hill, knoll, or mound. Other derivatives include Haugan, Haugen, and Hauge, all of which are also common Norwegian surnames. Haugli may refer to:

- Håkon Haugli (born 1969), Norwegian politician from the Labour Party
- Maren Haugli (born 1985), Norwegian long track speed skater who participates in international competitions
- Robby Roarsen Haugli (born 1974), Norwegian sprint canoer who competed in the late 1990s
- Sverre Ingolf Haugli (1925–1986), Norwegian speed skater
- Sverre Haugli (born 1982), Norwegian long track speed skater who participates in international competitions
- Willy Haugli (1927–2009), Norwegian jurist, university director and police chief
- Hans Christian Haugli, CEO of Telenor Objects, former CEO of Telenor Research and Innovation (R&I)
