= Hauger =

Hauger is a Norwegian surname, derived from the Old Norse word haugr meaning hill, knoll, or mound. Related derivatives include the common Norwegian surnames Haugan, Hauge and Haugen. Notable people with the surname include:

- Art Hauger (1893-1944), American major league baseball player
- Dennis Hauger (born 2003), Norwegian racing driver
- Folke Hauger Johannessen (1913–1997), Norwegian military officer and admiral of the Royal Norwegian Navy
- Henning Hauger (born 1985), Norwegian professional football midfielder
- Torill Thorstad Hauger (1943-2014), Norwegian writer and illustrator

== See also ==
- Hauger BK, bandy club from Bærum, Norway
- Hauger FK, football club from Bærum, Norway
- Hauger (station), station on the rapid transit system of Oslo, Norway
