= Haugr =

Haugr is a Norse name and landform name deriving from the noun Old Norse: haugr meaning hill, knoll, hollow, or mound. When used in English contexts, it may refer to a tumulus, or barrow.

Haugr may also refer to:

== Surnames ==
- Haugan (name), a derivation of "Haugr"
- Hauge, a derivation of "Haugr"
- Haugen (surname), a derivation of "Haugr"
- Haugland (name), a derivation of "Haugr"
- Howe (surname), a derivation of "Haugr"

== See also ==
- Haugan (disambiguation)
- Hauge (disambiguation)
- Haugen (disambiguation)
- Haugland (disambiguation)
- Howe (disambiguation)
