= Haugland (name) =

- Pronunciation: "Hæu:g-lan" (Norw); "Howg-land" (Eng)

Origin
- Origin: Old Norse haugr
- Meaning: hill, knoll, or mound
- Region of origin: Norway

Other names
- Variant forms: Haugen, Haugan, Hauge

Haugland is a Norwegian surname from any of numerous farmsteads in Norway. From Old Norse word haugr meaning hill or mound. Other derivatives include Hauge, Haugan and Haugen, all common Norwegian family names. Notable people with the surname include:

- Aage Haugland (1944-2000), Danish operatic bass
- Åshild Haugland (born 1986), a Norwegian politician
- Baard Madsen Haugland (1835-1896), Norwegian politician
- Bill Haugland, Canadian television news anchorman
- Brynhild Haugland (1905-1998), American Republican Party politician
- Curly Haugland, American politician, member of the RNC rules committee.
- Eugen Haugland (1912-1990), Norwegian triple jumper
- Glenn Erik Haugland (born 1961), an American contemporary composer
- Hanne Haugland (born 1967), Norwegian high jumper
- Hanne Haugland (born 1991), a Norwegian speed skater
- Ian Haugland (born 1964), Swedish drummer
- Jens Haugland (1910-1991), Norwegian politician
- Jens Edv. Haugland (1924-1981), Norwegian politician
- John Haugland (born 1946), Norwegian former rally driver
- Knut Haugland (1917-2009), Norwegian resistance fighter, noted explorer, and crewmember of Kon-Tiki
- Richard P. (Dick) Haugland (1943-2016), American scientist, inventor and philanthropist
- Sven A. Haugland (born 1948), Norwegian organizational theorist
- Terje Haugland (born 1944), Norwegian long jumper
- Trond Inge Haugland (born 1976), a former Norwegian football player
- Tove Welle Haugland (born 1989), a Norwegian politician
- Valgerd Svarstad Haugland (born 1956), Norwegian leader of the Christian Democratic Party
- Vernon Arnold Haugland (1908-1984), an American reporter
