= Haugerud =

Haugerud is a Norwegian surname, derived from the Old Norse word haugr meaning hill, knoll, or mound. Related derivatives include the common Norwegian surnames Haugan, Hauge and Haugen. Haugerud can refer to:

== People ==
- Johs Haugerud (1896–1971), Norwegian politician
- Rita Haugerud (1919–2014), Norwegian politician
- Howard E. Haugerud (1924–2019), American diplomat
- Neil Sherman Haugerud (1930–2019), American politician
- Dag Johan Haugerud (born 1964), Norwegian librarian, novelist, screenwriter, and film director

== Places ==
- Haugerud, Oslo
- Haugerud (station), Oslo
