= Haugen =

Haugen is a Norwegian surname and place name frequently used for farm homesteads. Haugen derives from the old Norse word haugr meaning tiny hill, small grassy knoll, or mound. Derivatives also include the Norwegian surnames Haugan and Hauge.

Haugen can refer to:

== People ==
- Haugen (surname)

== Places ==
=== United States ===
- Haugen Township, Aitkin County, Minnesota, a township in Aitkin county, Minnesota
- Haugen, Wisconsin, a village in Barron county, Wisconsin
- Trollhaugen, a ski resort in Dresser, Wisconsin

=== Norway ===
- Båthaugen, the site of the Tune ship in Rolvsøy in Sarpsborg Municipality in Østfold county
- Borrehaugene, a Norwegian national park in Horten Municipality in Vestfold county
- Flagghaugen, a burial site at Avaldsnes in Karmøy Municipality in Rogaland county
- Gamlehaugen, a residence of the Norwegian royal family in Bergen Municipality in Vestland county
- Gokstadhaugen, a burial mound in Sandefjord Municipality in Vestfold county
- Haraldshaugen - Norwegian national monument in Haugesund Municipality in Rogaland county
- Karnilshaugen, a site of Karnils burial mound in Gloppen Municipality in Vestland county
- Maihaugen, a large open-air museum located in Lillehammer Municipality in Innlandet county
- Oseberghaugen, a Viking-era grave site located in Tønsberg Municipality in Vestfold county
- St. Hanshaugen Park, a public park in the city of Oslo
- Tinghaugen, the site of an early Norwegian court in Frosta Municipality in Trøndelag county
- Troldhaugen, the residence of Edvard Grieg in the city of Bergen

== See also ==
- Haugan (disambiguation)
- Hauge (disambiguation)
- Haugr
