= Vladimir Ryabinin =

Russian oceanographer and climatologist

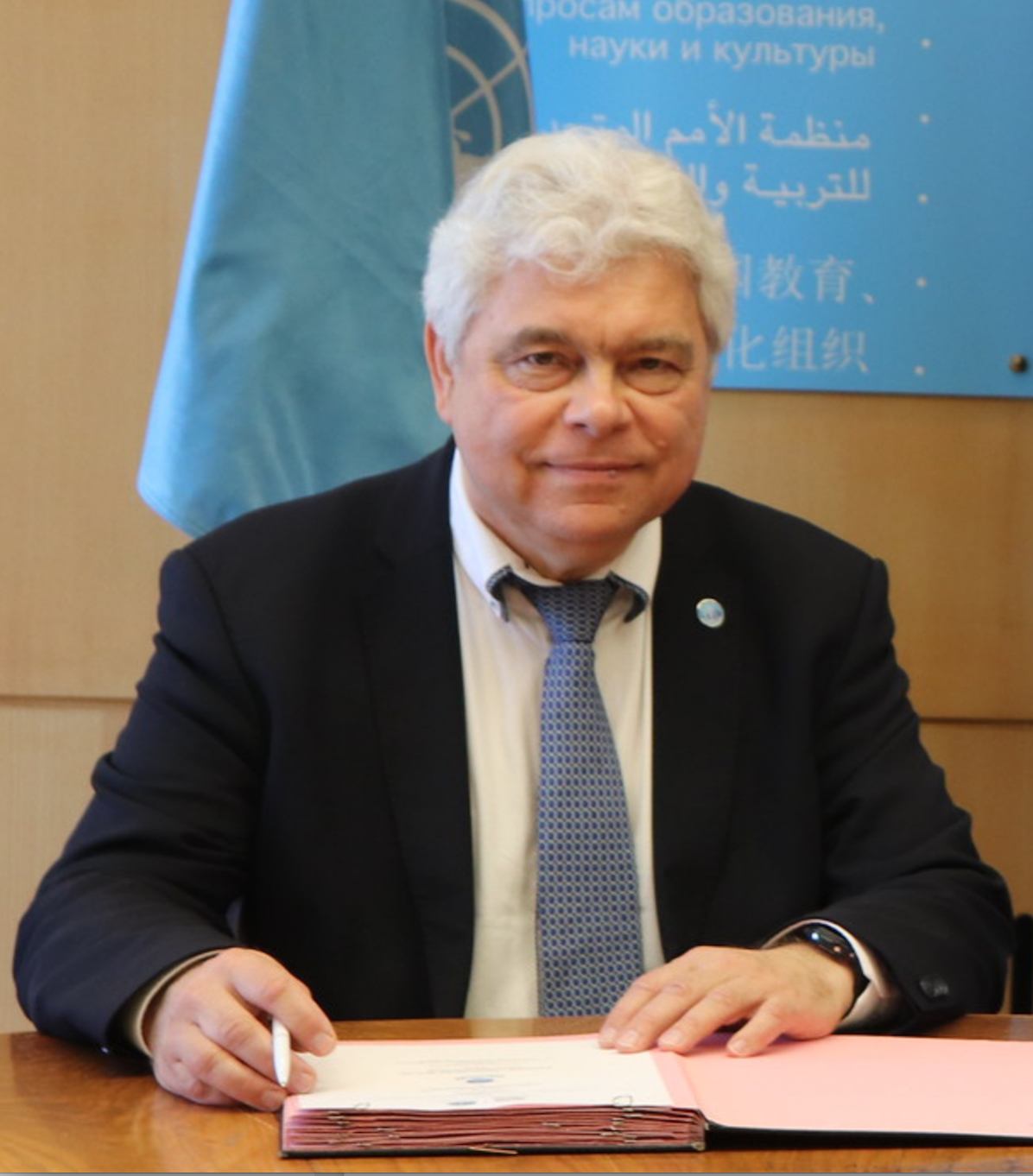
- Vladimir Ryabinin in 2019

Vladimir Ryabinin (Russian: Влади́мир Эдуа́рдович Ряби́нин), born 23 May 1956 in the city of Korolev in Moscow Oblast, Russia, is a Russian oceanographer, climatologist, and meteorologist. On 1 March 2015 he became the executive secretary of the Intergovernmental Oceanographic Commission (IOC) of UNESCO and assistant director general of UNESCO.

== Education, academic degrees, affiliations ==
In 1978 Ryabinin graduated from the then Leningrad Hydrometeorological Institute (presently the Russian State Hydrometeorological University) as an engineer-oceanographer.

In 1982 he defended his Candidate of Sciences thesis in physical oceanography (equiv. PhD) and in 1995 was awarded the academic degree of Doctor of sciences (habilitation) for research on complex hydrodynamical predictions of marine meteorological variables.

In 1978–2000 Ryabinin worked at the Hydrometeorological Centre of Russia. In 1990–1991 he lectured at the Moscow State University. In 2000–2001 he worked at the International Ocean Institute, initially as consultant and later as Executive Director. In 2001 he started to work for the United Nations.

== Research ==
Dr Ryabinin's research is in the areas of ocean circulation and thermodynamics, numerical weather prediction, marine meteorology, wind wave modeling, and shelf engineering. He is one of the originators of the first operational technology for weekly numerical weather prediction in the USSR, to which he contributed parameterizations of physical processes in the atmospheric model. In 1991-1996 he led one of the first polar shelf studies to determine the optimal burying depth of an underwater pipeline subject to risk of impact by sea-ice bottom gouging. In the 1990s, Ryabinin developed a 3rd generation spectral wind wave model with a numerical scheme allowing stable runs with extra-long time steps.

== Work with the United Nations ==
In 1984 Ryabinin was appointed the Rapporteur on Marine Meteorological Services in the World Meteorological Organization (WMO) Regional Association II (Asia). Later, he served as the Chair of Subgroup on Wave Modelling and Forecasting of the WMO Working Group on Marine Meteorological Services. He was among a group of international experts that developed a proposal for the Joint WMO-IOC Technical Commission for Oceanography and Marine Meteorology (JCOMM). In 1997–1999 he served as Vice-Chair of the Intergovernmental IOC-WMO-UNEP Committee of the Global Ocean Observing System (GOOS).

From late 2001 to early 2015 he worked in the Secretariat of the WMO as the Senior Scientific Officer of the World Climate Research Programme (WCRP). He provided support to the WCRP Arctic Climate System Study (1994–2003), Climate and Cryosphere Project (started 2004), Stratospheric Processes and their Role in Climate Project (started 1992), Global Energy and Water Exchanges (started 1990), to the two WCRP Grand Challenges, namely on Regional Sea-Level Rise and on Cryosphere. He contributed to the setup and implementation of the International Polar Year 2007–2008 and co-coordinated the preparation of the Integrated Global Observing Strategy Report on Cryosphere, which subsequently led to the establishment of the WMO Global Cryosphere Watch. Other notable areas of work included the Global Framework for Climate Services, the Scientific Assessment of Ozone Depletion – 2010, and the Earth system chapter of the Global Environment Outlook - 5.

== Executive Secretary of the IOC ==
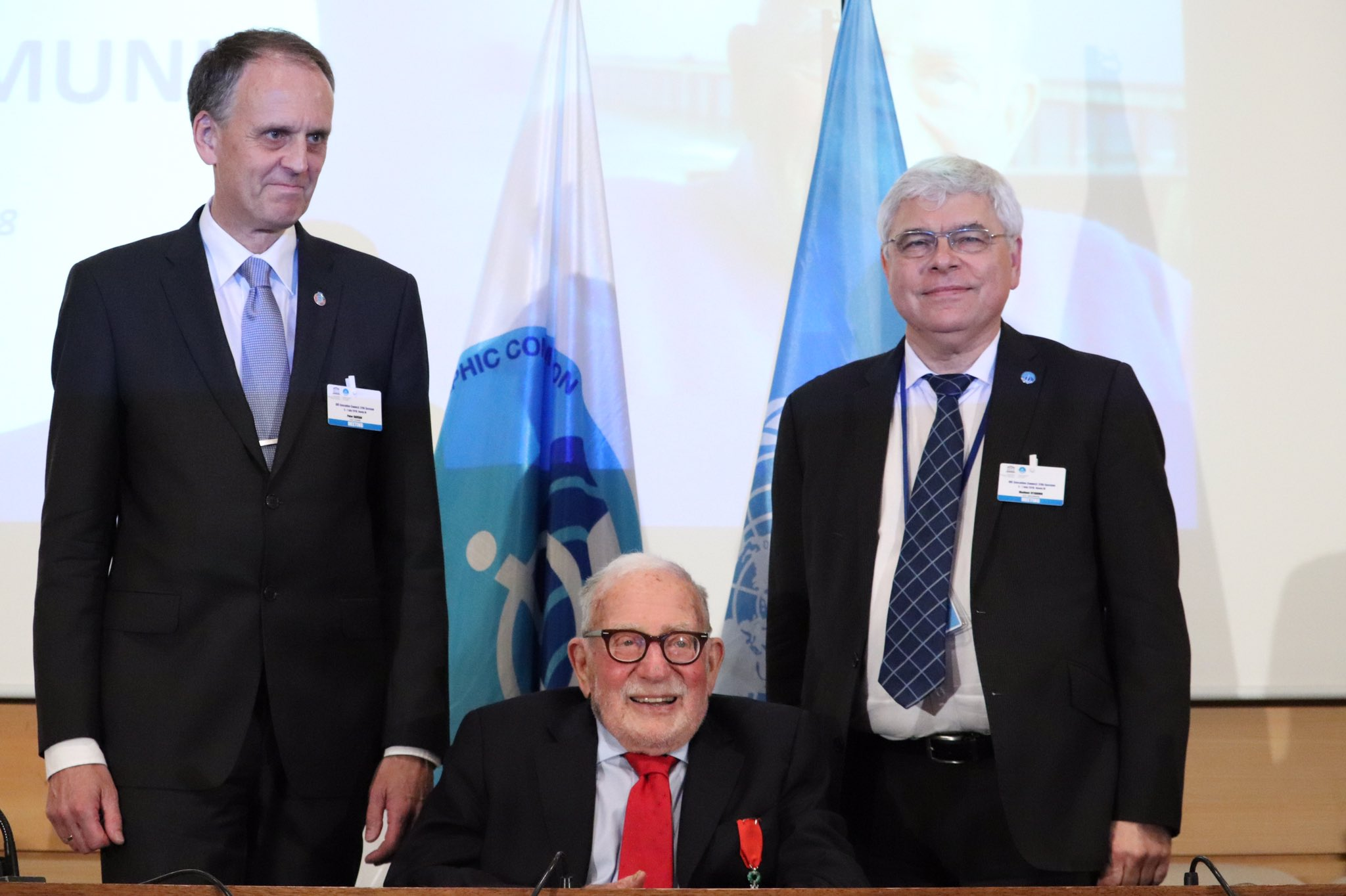
IOC Chair Professor Peter Haugan, Professor Walter Munk, and Dr Vladimir Ryabinin (from left to right) after the award ceremony of the IOC Roger Revelle Memorial Lecture Medal, 5 July 2018.

Ryabinin was appointed as Executive Secretary of IOC on 1 March 2015 following voting at the 47th Session of the IOC Executive Council in July 2014. He is the ninth Executive Secretary of IOC since its establishment in 1960. In 2015 he initiated brainstorming on IOC contribution to the agenda of sustainability. In 2017, the IOC submitted to the United Nations a proposal to conduct a UN Decade of Ocean Science for Sustainable Development. In December 2017, the 72nd UN General Assembly proclaimed the Decade for 10 years starting on 1 January 2021. The Implementation Plan for the Decade presents the Decade vision as “the science we need for the ocean we want”.

A highlight in the history of IOC was a Roger Revelle memorial lecture on 5 July 2018 at the 51st Session of the IOC Executive Council, which was given by a 100-year old oceanographer Walter Munk, a friend of Revelle. Early in 2018 Ryabinin met with Munk during a meeting held at the Scripps Institution of Oceanography and soon after invited him, on behalf of IOC Chair Peter M. Haugan, to give a Roger Revelle memorial lecture, which is a regular feature of IOC Executive Council Sessions. The lecture took place 2 days after Munk received the distinction of Chevallier (Knight) of the Legion of Honour by the Government of France.

== Honours ==
- 2017: Honorary Meteorologist (Заслуженный метеоролог) of the Russian Federation
- 2020: Compass International Award of the Marine Technology Society
