= Sellæg =

Sellæg is a Norwegian surname. Notable people with the surname include:

- Sissel Sellæg (1928–2014), Norwegian actress
- Wenche Frogn Sellæg (born 1937), Norwegian politician
