= An Officer and a Gentleman =

1982 film by Taylor Hackford

- Theatrical release poster
- Directed by: Taylor Hackford
- Written by: Douglas Day Stewart
- Produced by: Martin Elfand
- Starring: Richard Gere; Debra Winger; David Keith; Louis Gossett Jr.
- Cinematography: Donald E. Thorin
- Edited by: Peter Zinner
- Music by: Jack Nitzsche
- Production company: Lorimar Productions
- Distributed by: Paramount Pictures
- Release date: July 28, 1982 (United States)
- Running time: 124 minutes
- Country: United States
- Language: English
- Budget: $6–7 million
- Box office: $190 million

An Officer and a Gentleman is a 1982 American romantic drama film directed by Taylor Hackford from a screenplay by Douglas Day Stewart, and starring Richard Gere, Debra Winger, and Louis Gossett Jr. It tells the story of Zack Mayo (Gere), a United States Navy Aviation Officer Candidate who is beginning his training at Aviation Officer Candidate School. While Zack meets his first true girlfriend during his training, a young "townie" named Paula (Winger), he also comes into conflict with the hard-driving Marine Corps Gunnery Sergeant Emil Foley (Gossett) training his class.

The film was commercially released by Paramount Pictures in the United States on August 13, 1982. It was well received by critics, with a number calling it the best film of 1982. The film was also a financial success, grossing $190 million against a budget of between $6–7 million. Gossett won the Golden Globe Award, as well as the Academy Award for Best Supporting Actor, making him the first African-American actor to win in that category. It received Oscar nominations for Best Actress (for Winger), Best Original Screenplay, Best Film Editing, and Best Original Score, also winning for Best Original Song (for "Up Where We Belong").

== Plot ==
After his mother committed suicide, adolescent Zachary "Zack" Mayo was sent to live with his father Byron, an alcoholic, womanizing US Navy petty officer stationed in the Philippines.

Now a college graduate, Zack surprises Byron by telling him he has joined the Navy because he wants to become a jet pilot. He reports to Fort Rainier, an Aviation Officer Candidate School (AOCS) located near Port Townsend, Washington. Upon arriving, Zack and other recruits meet Marine Gunnery Sergeant Emil Foley, their strict, no-nonsense drill instructor.

Foley tells recruits that only the most capable recruits will become Naval Aviators. Male candidates are warned about "Puget Sound Debs", local girls aspiring to marry a pilot. Soon after, Zack and fellow AOC Sid Worley meet two young factory workers, Paula Pokrifki and Lynette Pomeroy; Zack begins a relationship with Paula while Sid dates Lynette.

Zack is caught peddling contraband uniform accessories needed to pass inspections to his fellow candidates. Foley punishes Zack with rigorous hazing to push him to resign, telling him he lacks the character to be an officer. When Zack refuses to quit, Foley threatens to dismiss him. Zack breaks down and admits that he has no options in civilian life.

Foley relents, assigning Zack menial work. Zack gives away his stash of uniform accessories, in particular to his cash-strapped roommate Lionel Perryman. During the final obstacle-course run, he has a chance to break the base's record for the run, but instead stops to encourage classmate Casey Seeger to complete the run so that she, too, can graduate.

Paula's mother and younger sister are enchanted with Zack, but Paula's stepfather is hostile. Paula tells Zack that her biological father was an AOC who abandoned Paula's mother when she became pregnant. As graduation nears, and because if he graduates he will be transferred to another base for further training, Zack ends his relationship with Paula.

Sid tells Zack he plans to marry his late brother Tommy's fiancée after graduating. Lynette then tells Sid she is pregnant and he tries to convince her to get an abortion. After a severe anxiety attack during a high-altitude simulation in a pressure chamber, Sid decides to quit the program, realizing that he never wanted a military career and was assuming his brother's role to please his parents.

Sid proposes to Lynette, who initially accepts, but upon learning he has dropped out says the pregnancy was a false alarm. He wants them to marry anyway and move to Oklahoma, where he will resume his old job at a department store and work his way up. Lynnette rejects his proposal, insisting that she wants to marry a pilot and live overseas. A brokenhearted Sid leaves. Zack and Paula arrive soon after, looking for him; Zack accuses Lynette of faking the pregnancy, which she denies.

Zack and Paula find Sid at a motel where he has hanged himself. Blaming himself, Zack returns to the base and tells Foley he is quitting. Foley angrily challenges him to settle their differences in martial arts combat. Zack lands several blows on a surprised Foley, who then incapacitates him. Foley tells Zack that whether he quits or not is up to him.

Zack completes his training and is commissioned as an officer. He and his successful classmates, including Seeger and Perryman, receive their first salute from Foley. Zack thanks Foley, acknowledging that he would not have graduated without him. As Zack is leaving the base, he sees Foley greeting another incoming class of AOCs in the same way his own class was greeted when he first arrived.

Zack surprises Paula at her workplace. They embrace and he carries her outside to the applause of her co-workers, including Lynette.

== Cast ==
- Richard Gere as Aviation Officer Candidate (AOC) Zachary "Zack" Mayo
  - Tommy Petersen as young Zack
- Debra Winger as Paula Pokrifki
- David Keith as AOC Sid Worley
- Louis Gossett Jr. as Gunnery Sergeant Emil Foley, USMC
- Lisa Blount as Lynette Pomeroy
- Robert Loggia as Boatswain's Mate Byron Mayo, Zack's father
- Lisa Eilbacher as AOC Casey Seeger
- Tony Plana as AOC Emiliano Santos Della Serra
- Harold Sylvester as AOC Lionel Perryman
- David Caruso as AOC Topper Daniels
- Victor French as Joe Pokrifki, Paula's stepfather
- Grace Zabriskie as Esther Pokrifki, Paula's mother
- Elizabeth Rogers as Betty Worley, Sid's mother
- John Laughlin as Troy
- Ed Begley Jr. as Altitude Chamber Instructor (voice)

== Production ==
=== Writing ===
The film was based on Douglas Day Stewart's own experiences as a Naval Aviation Officer Candidate. Stewart had enrolled with the intention of becoming a pilot, but was later disqualified due to a medical issue, and was transferred to a unit overseeing the transportation of 7th Marine Regiment to Vietnam. After leaving the navy, he found success as a television and film screenwriter, and decided to write a script based on anecdotes from Candidate School.

The character Paula was based on a local factory worker with whom he'd had a relationship during Candidate School, though he did not go on to marry her.

=== Casting ===
Originally, folk music singer and occasional actor John Denver was signed to play Zack Mayo. But a casting process eventually involved Jeff Bridges, Harry Hamlin, Christopher Reeve, John Travolta, and Richard Gere. Gere eventually beat all the other actors for the part. Travolta had turned down the role, as he did with American Gigolo (another Richard Gere hit).

The role of Paula was originally given to Sigourney Weaver, then to Anjelica Huston and later to Jennifer Jason Leigh, who dropped out to do the film Fast Times at Ridgemont High instead. Eventually, Debra Winger replaced Leigh for the role of Paula. Rebecca De Mornay, Meg Ryan, and Geena Davis auditioned for the role of Paula.

In spite of the strong on-screen chemistry between Gere and Winger, the actors did not get along during filming. Publicly, she called him a "brick wall" while he admitted there was "tension" between them. Thirty years later, Gere was complimentary toward Winger when he said that she was much more open to the camera than he was, and he appreciated the fact that she presented him with an award at the Rome Film Festival.

R. Lee Ermey was originally considered for the role of Gunnery Sgt. Emil Foley due to his time of being an actual drill instructor for the United States Marine Corps at Marine Corps Recruit Depot San Diego in the 1960s. However, Taylor Hackford instead cast Louis Gossett Jr. and had Ermey coach him for his role as the film's technical advisor. It was there where the "steers and queers" comment from Gossett's character in the 1982 movie came from, which was later used for Ermey's role in the 1987 film Full Metal Jacket. James Woods was also considered for the role, but turned it down as he didn't want to play a drill sergeant.

Hackford kept Gossett Jr. in separate living quarters from other actors during production so Gossett could intimidate them more during his scenes as drill instructor. In addition to R. Lee Ermey, Gossett was advised by Gunnery Sergeant Buck Welscher, an actual drill instructor at Aviation Officer Candidate School, NAS Pensacola. He can be seen leading the senior class after the run.

Although there were no mutual scenes, the film reunited Gossett with Victor French who portrayed Paula's stepfather. The actors had appeared together in a 1976 televised episode of Little House on the Prairie.

=== Filming locations ===
Filming on location began on April 20, 1981, on the Olympic Peninsula of Washington, at Port Townsend and Fort Worden. The US Navy did not permit filming at NAS Pensacola in the Florida panhandle, the site of the actual Aviation Officer Candidate School in 1981. Deactivated US Army base Fort Worden stood in for the location of the school, an actual Naval Air Station in the Puget Sound area, NAS Whidbey Island.

A motel in Port Townsend, the Tides Inn on Water Street (48.1105°N 122.765°W), was used for the film. A plaque outside a room at the motel noted it as a filming location, although the room has been extensively refurbished. Some early scenes of the movie were filmed in Bremerton, with ships of the Puget Sound Naval Shipyard in the background.

The "Dilbert Dunker" scenes were filmed in the swimming pool at what is now Mountain View Elementary School (Port Townsend Jr. High School during filming). According to the director's commentary on the DVD, the dunking machine was constructed specifically for the film and was an exact duplicate of the actual one used by the navy. As of 2010, Mountain View Elementary was closed and was home to the Mountain View Commons, which holds the police station, fire station, food bank, methadone clinic, counseling center, homeless shelter and the YMCA, the last of which holds the pool.

The filming location of Paula Pokrifiki's house was 1003 Tremont in Port Townsend. As of 2009, the house was shrouded by a large hedge, and the front porch had been remodeled. The neighboring homes and landscape look identical to their appearance in the film, including the "crooked oak tree" across the street from the Pokrifiki home. This oak tree is visible in the scene near the end of the film in which Richard Gere returns to the home to request Paula's help in finding his friend Sid. In the film, the plot has Paula leaving on a ferry ride away from the naval base. In reality, Paula's home is located approximately 8 blocks from Fort Worden.

Lynette Pomeroy's house was located on Mill Road, just west of the main entrance of the Port Townsend Paper Corp. mill. The house no longer exists, but the concrete driveway pad is still visible.

The interior of the USO building at Fort Worden State Park was used for the reception scene near the beginning of the film.

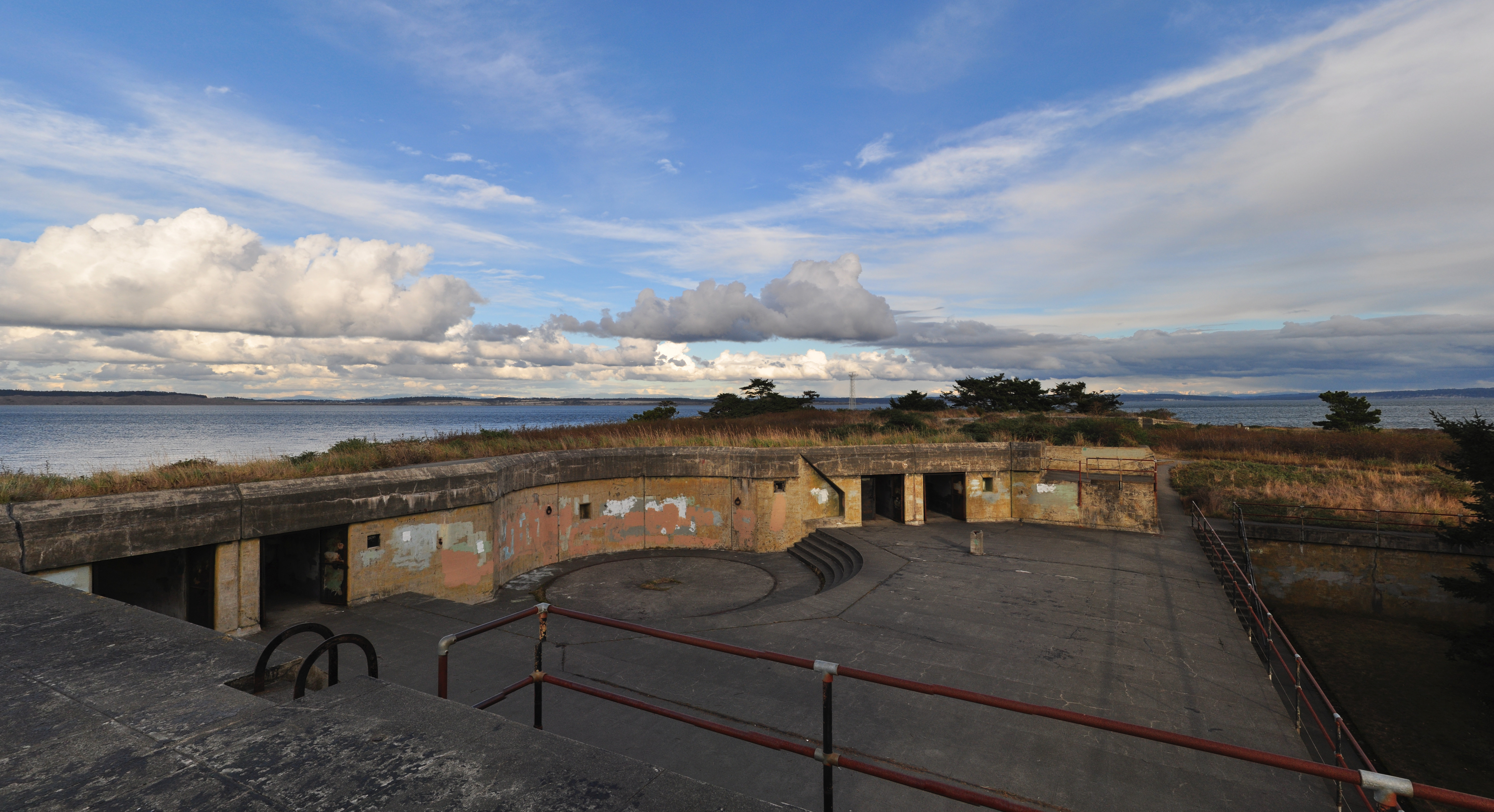
Battery Kinzie, scene of "I got nowhere else to go!"

The concrete structure used during the famous Richard Gere line "I got nowhere else to go!" is the Battery Kinzie located at Fort Worden State Park. The scene was filmed on the southwest corner of the upper level of the battery. The "obstacle course" was constructed specifically for the film and was located in the grassy areas just south and southeast of Battery Kinzie.

The decompression chamber was one of the only sets constructed for the film and as of 2013, it was still intact in the basement of building number 225 of the Fort Worden State Park. It can be seen through the windows of the building's basement.

Building 204 of Fort Worden State Park was used as the dormitory and its porch was used for the film's closing "silver dollar" scene.

The blimp hangar used for the famous fight scene between Louis Gossett Jr. and Richard Gere is located at Fort Worden State Park and as of 2013 is still intact, but has been converted into a 1200-seat performing arts center called the McCurdy Pavilion.

The filming location for the exterior of "TJ's Restaurant" is located at the Point Hudson Marina in Port Townsend. The space is now occupied by a company that makes sails. The fictional "TJ's" is an homage to the Trader Jon's bar in Pensacola, Florida, as a naval aviator hangout until it closed later in November 2003. For years, it was traditional for graduating Aviation Officer Candidate School classes to celebrate their commissioning at "Trader's." Filming ended on June 2, 1981, after 43 days.

=== Props ===
Richard Gere rides a 750cc T140E Triumph Bonneville. Paramount purchased two of the motorcycles from Dewey's Cycle Shop in Seattle. The stunt bike is on display in the Planet Hollywood restaurant, Orlando, Florida. In the United Kingdom, Paramount linked with Triumph Motorcycles (Meriden) Ltd on a mutual promotion campaign. Triumph's then-chairman, John Rosamond, in his book Save The Triumph Bonneville! (Veloce 2009), states it was agreed cinemas showing the film would be promoted at their local Triumph dealer, and T140E Triumph Bonnevilles supplied by the dealer would be displayed in the cinema's foyers.

=== Ending ===
Richard Gere balked at shooting the ending of the film, in which Zack arrives at Paula's factory wearing his naval dress whites and carries her off the factory floor. Gere thought the ending would not work because it was too sentimental. Director Taylor Hackford agreed with Gere until, during a rehearsal, the extras playing the workers began to cheer and cry. When Gere saw the scene later, with a portion of the score (that was used to write "Up Where We Belong") played at the right tempo, he said it gave him chills. Gere is now convinced Hackford made the right decision. Screenwriter Michael Hauge, in his book Writing Screenplays That Sell, echoed this opinion: "I don't believe that those who criticized this Cinderella-style ending were paying very close attention to who exactly is rescuing whom."

== Release ==
Two versions of the film exist. The original, an uncensored R-rated cut and an edited-for-broadcast television cut (which first aired on NBC in 1986) are nearly identical. The main difference is that the nudity and a majority of the foul language are edited out when the film airs on regular television. However, the group marching song near the beginning of the film and Mayo's solo marching song are not voiceover edits; they are reshoots of those scenes for television. Also, the sex scene between Mayo and Paula is cut in half, and the scene where Mayo finds Sid's naked body hanging in the shower is also edited.

=== Home media ===
The film has been available on various formats, first on VHS and also DVD. It was first released on DVD in 2000 with two extra features, audio commentary and film trailer. It was released as a collectors edition in 2007 with new bonus material. The film debuted on Blu-ray in the US by Warner Bros. and UK by Paramount Pictures in 2013, however the same bonus features ported from the 2007 DVD are only on the US release. It was re-released in 2017 by Paramount Pictures.

== Reception ==
=== Box office ===
An Officer and a Gentleman was an enormous box office success and went on to become the third-highest-grossing film of 1982, after E.T.: The Extra Terrestrial and Tootsie. It grossed $3,304,679 in its opening weekend and $130 million overall at the US and Canadian box office. It sold an estimated 44 million tickets in the US and Canada. Internationally, it grossed $60 million for a worldwide gross of $190 million.

=== Critical response ===
An Officer and a Gentleman was well received by critics and is widely considered one of the best films of 1982. On the review aggregator website Rotten Tomatoes, the film holds an approval rating of 79% based on 34 reviews, with an average rating of 7.6/10. The site's critics consensus reads: "Old-fashioned without sacrificing its characters to simplicity, An Officer and a Gentleman successfully walks the fine line between sweeping romance and melodrama." On Metacritic it has a weighted average score of 75 out of 100 based on eight critics, indicating "generally favorable" reviews.

Roger Ebert gave the film four out of four stars, and described it as "a wonderful movie precisely because it's so willing to deal with matters of the heart...it takes chances, takes the time to know and develop its characters, and by the time this movie's wonderful last scene comes along, we know exactly what's happening, and why, and it makes us very happy."

Rex Reed gave a glowing review where he commented: "This movie will make you feel ten feet tall!" British film critic Mark Kermode, an admirer of Taylor Hackford, observed, "It's a much tougher film than people remember it being; it's not a romantic movie, it's actually a movie about blue-collar, down-trodden people."

=== Accolades ===
Award	Category	Nominee(s)	Result	Ref.
Academy Awards	Best Actress	Debra Winger	Nominated	
Academy Awards	Best Supporting Actor	Louis Gossett Jr.	Won	
Academy Awards	Best Screenplay – Written Directly for the Screen	Douglas Day Stewart	Nominated	
Academy Awards	Best Film Editing	Peter Zinner	Nominated	
Academy Awards	Best Original Score	Jack Nitzsche	Nominated	
Academy Awards	Best Original Song	"Up Where We Belong"; Music by Jack Nitzsche and Buffy Sainte-Marie; Lyrics by Will Jennings	Won	
British Academy Film Awards	Best Score for a Film	Jack Nitzsche	Nominated	
British Academy Film Awards	Best Original Song Written for a Film	"Up Where We Belong"; Music by Jack Nitzsche and Buffy Sainte-Marie; Lyrics by Will Jennings	Won	
Directors Guild of America Awards	Outstanding Directorial Achievement in Motion Pictures	Taylor Hackford	Nominated	
Golden Globe Awards	Best Motion Picture – Drama		Nominated	
Golden Globe Awards	Best Actor in a Motion Picture – Drama	Richard Gere	Nominated	
Golden Globe Awards	Best Actress in a Motion Picture – Drama	Debra Winger	Nominated	
Golden Globe Awards	Best Supporting Actor – Motion Picture	Louis Gossett Jr.	Won	
Golden Globe Awards	Best Supporting Actor – Motion Picture	David Keith	Nominated	
Golden Globe Awards	Best Original Song – Motion Picture	"Up Where We Belong"; Music by Jack Nitzsche and Buffy Sainte-Marie; Lyrics by Will Jennings	Won	
Golden Globe Awards	New Star of the Year – Actor	David Keith	Nominated	
Golden Globe Awards	New Star of the Year – Actress	Lisa Blount	Nominated	
Grammy Awards	Best Pop Performance by a Duo or Group with Vocal	"Up Where We Belong" – Joe Cocker & Jennifer Warnes	Won	
Japan Academy Film Prize	Outstanding Foreign Language Film		Won	
NAACP Image Awards	Outstanding Motion Picture		Won	
NAACP Image Awards	Outstanding Actor in a Motion Picture	Louis Gossett Jr.	Won	
National Board of Review Awards	Top Ten Films		4th Place	
Writers Guild of America Awards	Best Drama – Written Directly for the Screen	Douglas Day Stewart	Nominated	

- Louis Gossett Jr. became the first Black actor to win the Academy Award for Best Supporting Actor and the fourth Black Oscar winner overall (after Hattie McDaniel, Sidney Poitier, and Isaac Hayes).
- Producer Don Simpson complained about the song "Up Where We Belong", "The song is no good. It isn't a hit," and unsuccessfully demanded it be cut from the film. It later became the number-one song on the Billboard Hot 100.

The film is recognized by American Film Institute in these lists:

- 2002: AFI's 100 Years...100 Passions—#29
- 2004: AFI's 100 Years...100 Songs:
  - "Up Where We Belong"—#75
- 2006: AFI's 100 Years...100 Cheers—#68

== Soundtrack ==
=== Track listing (original recording) ===
Song	Lyrics by	Performed by
"Up Where We Belong"	Will Jennings	Joe Cocker and Jennifer Warnes
"Theme from 'An Officer and a Gentleman'"	Jack Nitzsche and Buffy Sainte-Marie	Jack Nitzche
"Treat Me Right"	D. Lubahn and Pat Benatar	Pat Benatar
"Hungry for Your Love"	Van Morrison	Van Morrison
"Be Real"	D. Sahm	Sir Douglas Quintet
"Tush"	B. Gibbons, D. Hill and F. Beard	ZZ Top
"Tunnel of Love"	Mark Knopfler	Dire Straits
"Feelings"	Morris Albert	Morris Albert
"Tie a Yellow Ribbon Round the Ole Oak Tree"	Irwin Levine and L. Russell Brown	Greg Pecknold
"Anchors Aweigh"	Charles A. Zimmerman, George D. Lottman and Alfred Hart Miles	
"Moon River"	Henry Mancini and Johnny Mercer	
"Big Money Dollars"	John Thomas Lenox	
"Gamelan Gong: Barong Dance"	David Lewiston	
"The Plains of Mindanao"	Bayanihan 7	
"Galan Kangin"	Gong Kebyar, Sebatu	
"Love Theme From 'An Officer And A Gentleman"	Jack Nitzsche, Buffy Sainte-Marie, Lee Ritenour	Lee Ritenour
"The Morning After Love Theme"	Jack Nitzsche	Jack Nitzsche

=== Charts ===
Chart (1982–1983)	Peak position
Australia (Kent Music Report)	28
United States (Billboard 200)	38

== Adaptations ==
- The Takarazuka Revue adapted the movie as a musical in 2010 in Japan (Takarazuka Grand Theater; Tokyo Takarazuka Theater). The production was performed by Star Troupe and the cast included Reon Yuzuki as Zack Mayo, Nene Yumesaki as Paula Pokrifki and Kaname Ouki as Gunnery Sergeant Emil Foley.
- A stage musical, with book by Douglas Day Stewart and Sharleen Cooper Cohen and songs by Ken Hirsch and Robin Lerner, directed by Simon Phillips, opened on May 18, 2012, at the Lyric Theatre in Sydney, Australia. The production received mixed reviews and closed after six weeks.
- In 1990, the American TV show The Simpsons adapted the iconic final scene of the film in the 9th episode of the first season, "Life on the Fast Lane". The gender roles are swapped as Marge plays the role of Gere, finding Homer's Winger in the nuclear power plant, after fears on infidelity in their marriage are swept away as Marge is carried away by Homer in the exact fashion as the movie.
- In 1992, the American sitcom Clarissa Explains It All parodies the final scene in season 3's first episode "Janet's Old Boyfriend." Main character Clarissa imagines her mother being swept away like Debra Winger in the film by her visiting old high school boyfriend Joey Russo as Richard Gere.
- The sitcom Scrubs parodies the final scene in the season 6 episode "His Story IV", with Dr. Bob Kelso alternating between the two roles in two separate daydreaming sequences, with an unnamed Asian woman.
- The iconic "I got nowhere else to go" moment was parodied in Wayne's World 2 by Chris Farley when asked by a drill seargentesque Wayne why he wants to be a WayneStock stagehand, despite his inability to perform the required tasks.
- Barcelona (1994) was premised by director Whit Stillman as "if the officer and the gentleman were two different people."
- In June 2024, Miles Teller started to develop a remake by Paramount.

== Sequel-novel ==
- In 2024, Douglas Day Stewart released An Officer and a Gentleman's Daughter; set 3 decades after the film, this novel finds Captain Zack Mayo preparing to retire after a successful naval career. He remains good friends with classmates-turned-officers Lionel Perryman, Emiliano Della-Serra, and Admiral Casey Seeger. Paula died 10 years ago. Foley, having lost both legs in a training accident, has retired from the USMC; he now runs his own martial arts-studio. Topper Daniels, who Dropped On Request after nearly drowning in the Dilbert Dunker, is now the Secretary of the Navy. Amid all of this, former drug-addict Shannon Mayo — Zack's and Paula's daughter, who was presumed killed in a fire two years ago — reenters his life...as a Naval Officer Candidate.
