= Haugsrud =

Haugsrud is a Norwegian surname. Notable people with the surname include:

- Ole Haugsrud (1899–1976), American sports executive
- Per Haugsrud (born 1965), Norwegian golfer

== See also ==
- Haugerud (disambiguation)
