= John R. Lindgren =

American banking executive

John R. Lindgren (February 20, 1855 – April 29, 1915) was an American banking executive.

== Biography ==
John Richard Lindgren was born in Chicago, Illinois, the only son of Charles Magnus Lindgren, a Swedish-born ship captain and vessel-owner of Chicago. With Helge Alexander Haugan, Lindgren established the banking firm of Haugan & Lindgren in 1879. During 1889, Lindgren was the principal founder of the Bank of Galesburg in Galesburg, Illinois. In 1891, he was elected cashier and vice president of the State Bank of Chicago.

For many years Lindgren held a membership in the Chicago Board of Trade, as well as the Chicago Stock Exchange. Lindgren was appointed honorary vice consul of Sweden–Norway at Chicago in 1893. He was subsequently awarded the Order of Vasa by King Oscar II. Lindgren was a member of the Swedish-American Historic Society and a trustee of Northwestern University. Lindgren Hall, a student residence hall on the Evanston campus of Northwestern University, was named in honor of Lindgren.
