= Sorten Muld =

Danish folktronica band

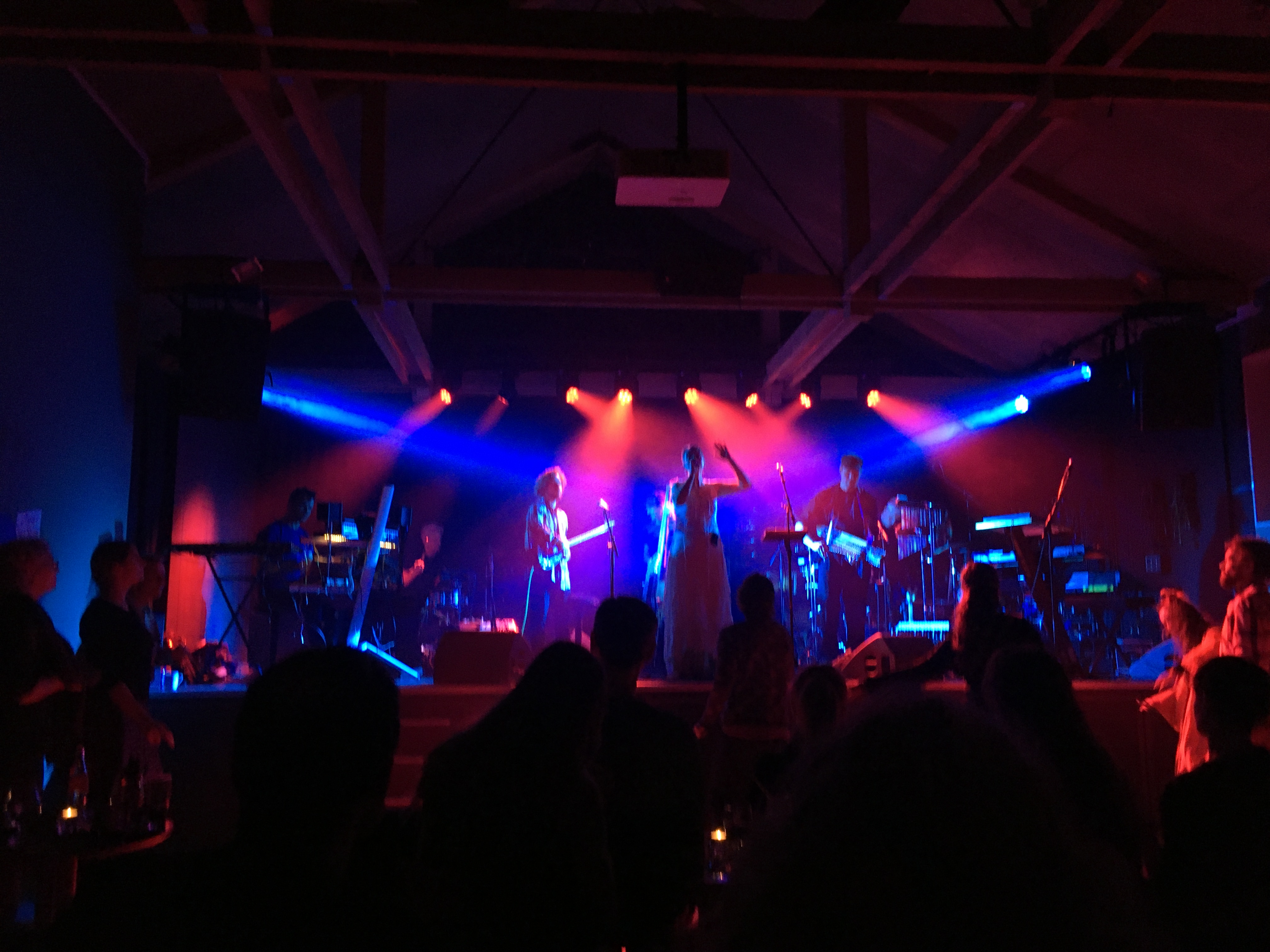
- Sorten Muld in 2022

Background information
- Origin: Århus, Denmark
- Genres: Folktronica
- Years active: 1995–present
- Labels: Northside Records
- Members: Ulla Bendixen; Martin Ottesen; Henrik Munch

Sorten Muld (lit. 'Black Soil' or 'Dark Ground') is a Danish folktronica band, formed in 1995. They have won two Danish Grammys for Mark II.

Their music can be characterized by elegantly composed rhythms, floating sound of typical folk-instruments like bagpipes, flutes and violins, in an electronica-composition that supports the dramatic lyrics. Some tracks on Mark II are up-beat with only few lyrics and could also be characterized as dance or techno.

The lyrics are old stories from Danish folk tradition, about jealousy, murder, mythology and creatures. In "Kirstin" from Mark II a father serves his daughter a meal of her boyfriend's heart. In "Ulver" from III a man takes his girlfriend into the forest to kill and bury her. He falls asleep and she cuts him into pieces with his own sword.

Sorten Muld also published a concept album called Jord, Luft, Ild, Vand (Earth, Air, Fire, Water) – a mostly instrumental journey through the classic elements. The album is a reworked recording of music commissioned by Danske Gymnastik- & Idrætsforeninger for a gymnastics show on Bornholm. It was self-published and was only available to buy from their website.

After this album the group disappeared from the public eye, but in April and May 2011 they performed three concerts in Denmark, and again in 2012 at Tønder Festival. and in 2014 and 2019.

== Members ==
- Ulla Bendixen – vocals
- Martin Ottosen – musician-architect
- Henrik Munch – electronics

(all after this point appear on III only)

- Søren Bendixen – guitar
- Harald Haugaard – viola, violin, hurdy-gurdy
- Johannes Hejl – double bass
- Niels Kilele – percussion
- Tommy Nissen – drums
- Martin Seeberg – bagpipe, flute, Jewish harp

== Discography ==
=== Albums ===
- Sorten Muld (1996)
- Mark II (1997)
- III (2000)
- Jord, Luft, Ild, Vand (2002)
- Mark IV - Lånt tid (2021)

=== Singles ===
- "Ravnen" (1997)
- "Ravnen" (1997) (alternative cover/track list)
- "Bonden og Elverpigen" (1997)
- "Som Stjernerne på Himlens blå" (1997)
- "Venelite" (1998)
- "Mylardatter" (1998)
- "Vølven" (2000)
- "Glød/Gylden Glød" (2020) - with AySay
- "Sangen om jorden" (2021)
- "Venelite II" (2021)
- "Under Månens Blanke Tæppe" (2021)
