= Haugen (surname) =

- Pronunciation: HOW-gən

Origin
- Origin: Old Norse: haugr
- Meaning: hill, knoll, or mound
- Region of origin: Norway

Other names
- Variant forms: Haugan, Hauge, Häugen

Haugen is a Norwegian surname. Notable people with the surname include:

People with the surname tend to come from Norwegian descent.

== Academics ==
- Einar Haugen (1906–1994), American linguist, author and university professor
- Håvard Jostein Haugen, Norwegian materials scientist
- Odd Einar Haugen (born 1954), Norwegian philologist
- Robert Haugen (1942-2013), American professor of finance

== Artists ==
- Arne Haugen Sørensen (born 1932), Danish illustrator
- Jørgen Haugen Sørensen (1934–2021), Danish sculptor

== Performers ==
- Andrea Haugen (1969–2021), Norwegian recording artist known under her artist name of Nebelhexë
- Kim Haugen (born 1958), Norwegian actor, son of Per Theodor Haugen
- Lars Håvard Haugen (born 1969), Norwegian guitarist
- Per Theodor Haugen (1932-2018), Norwegian actor
- Tomas Thormodsæter Haugen, musician who performs under the name Samoth
- Sandra Lyng Haugen (born 1987), Norwegian singer
- Tomas Thormodsæter Haugen (born 1974), Norwegian musician

== Politicians ==
- Arne L. Haugen (born 1939), Norwegian politician
- Einar Kristian Haugen (1905–1968), Norwegian politician for the Labour Party
- Gilbert N. Haugen (1859–1933), American politician, co-sponsor of the McNary–Haugen Farm Relief Bill
- Helga Haugen (born 1932), Norwegian politician for the Christian Democratic Party
- Ingvald Haugen (1894–1958), Norwegian union leader and politician for the Labour Party
- Line Marlene Haugen (born 1993), Norwegian politician
- Mary Margaret Haugen (born 1941), American politician, Washington state senator
- Nils P. Haugen (1849–1931), American politician, U.S. Representative from Wisconsin
- Tore Haugen (born 1932), Norwegian politician for the Conservative Party of Norway

== Sportspeople ==
- Anders Haugen (1888–1984), Norwegian-American ski jumping champion
- Arild Haugen (born 1985), Norwegian strongman
- Arve Haugen (born 1943), Norwegian cyclist
- Fredrik Haugen (born 1992), Norwegian footballer
- Greg Haugen (1960–2025), American World Boxing Champion
- Gunhild Haugen (born 1972), Norwegian long-distance runner
- Helge Haugen (born 1982), Norwegian footballer
- Herman Haugen (born 2000), Norwegian footballer
- Kjartan Haugen (born 1975), Norwegian cross-country skier
- Kristoffer Haugen (born 1994), Norwegian footballer
- Lars Haugen (born 1987), Norwegian hockey player
- Leif Kristian Haugen (born 1987), Norwegian alpine ski racer
- Michael Haugen Jr. (born 1966), American bowler
- Per Haugen (born 1970), Norwegian windsurfer
- Ragnar Haugen (1911–1964), Norwegian boxer who competed in the 1936 Summer Olympics
- Sigurd Hauso Haugen (born 1997), Norwegian footballer
- Sofie Karoline Haugen (born 1995), Norwegian speed skater
- Stein Haugen (1933-2008), Norwegian discus thrower
- Tone Haugen (born 1964), Norwegian footballer and Olympic medalist
- Tormod Bjørnetun Haugen (born 1988), Norwegian speed skater
- Villy Haugen (born 1944), Norwegian speed skater, earned a bronze medal in the 1964 Winter Olympics

== Writers ==
- Eva Lund Haugen (1907–1996), American author and editor
- Paal-Helge Haugen (born 1945), Norwegian lyricist, novelist, dramatist, writer
- Tormod Haugen (1945–2008), Norwegian author
- Marty Haugen (1950- ), composer of liturgical music

== Others ==
- Frances Haugen, American data engineer and scientist, product manager, and whistleblower
- Gary Haugen (born 1963 or 1964), American lawyer and social activist, CEO of International Justice Mission
- Marty Haugen (born 1950), American composer of sacred popular music
- Odd Seim-Haugen (1937-2015), Norwegian barrister and sports official
- Orin D. Haugen (1907–1945), United States Army Colonel
- Roar Jens Haugen (1943–2025), Norwegian Army general
- Scott Haugen, American outdoorsman, author, speaker and television host (Game Chasers)
