= Helene Blum =

Danish folk music singer

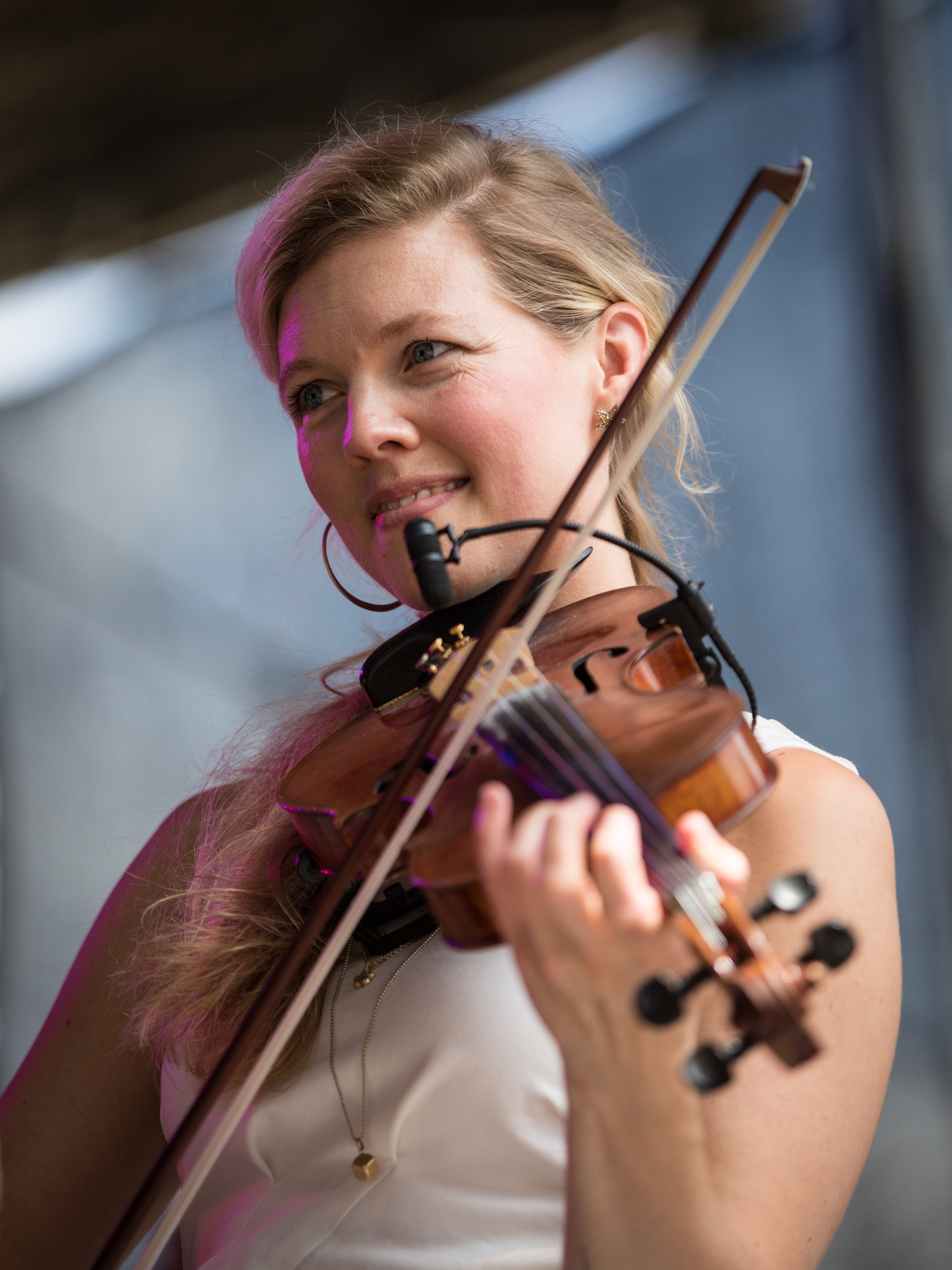
Helene Blum

Helene Blum (born 1979) is a Danish singer and musician who specializes in folk music. Since 2005, when she won the Danish Music Awards Folk prize for her album En sød og liflig klang, she has performed widely in Denmark, North America and Germany, frequently appearing with her husband Harald Haugaard.

== Biography ==
Born in 1979 in Gelsted on the Danish island of Funen, Helene Blum was the first singer to graduate from the folk music department at the Carl Nielsen Academy of Music in Odense when she received her diploma in 2004. Together with her husband, the fiddler Harald Haugaard, she has given over 700 performances in Denmark, Germany and North America. Composing most of her songs herself, she combines folk, pop and chanson.

Singing soprano, Blum has also performed in the ballet Medea at the Schleswig-Holsteinische Landestheater in Flensburg and in the opera Konsuma in Odense. The composer, Rasmus Zwicki, wrote a special part for her. She went on to perform in the Helene Blum & Harald Haugaard Quintet, singing and playing the violin. The other players are Kristine Elise Pedersen (cello), Mattias Perez (guitar), and Sune Rahbek (percussion). In 2017, the Helene Blum and Harald Haugaard Band also included Mikkel Grue (guitar) and Mathæus Bech (bass). Now averaging a hundred concerts a year, they have performed together in Germany, the United States, Austria, Norway, Canada, Japan and Denmark.

The Daily Telegraph included her Men med åbne øjne as one of the best folk music albums of 2013. Calling the album "an unexpected treat", the critic Martin Chilton praised Blum's "haunting voice", even if nearly all the lyrics were in Danish.

== Discography ==
Helene Blum has released the following albums:

- 2006 En sød og liflig klang
- 2009 En gang og altid
- 2010 Liden sol
- 2013 Men med åbne øjne
- 2016 Julerosen
- 2017 Dråber af Tid
- 2020 Strømmen
- 2023 Den store summer
