= H. G. Haugan =

- Born: November 7, 1840; Christiania, Norway
- Died: January 29, 1921 (aged 80); Pasadena, California, United States
- Occupations: Railroad and banking executive
- Years active: 1864-1910

H. G. Haugan (November 7, 1840 – January 29, 1921) was a Norwegian-born, American railroad and banking executive.

== Background ==
Hauman G. Haugan was born in Christiania (now Oslo), Norway. He was the elder son of Helge A. and Anna B. Haugan. Together with his brother Helge Alexander Haugan, he immigrated to Canada and moved to Montreal in 1859.

== Career ==
Haugan was bookkeeper and later acting cashier of Batavian Bank in La Crosse, Wisconsin from 1864 until 1870. Haugan entered railway service as paymaster and later auditor of the South Minnesota Railway Co., later the Minneapolis and St. Louis Railway from 1870 until 1880.

Haugan was the assistant to the comptroller and general manager of the Minneapolis and St. Louis Railway from 1880 until 1893. Haugan later served with the Chicago, Milwaukee and St. Paul Railway, as Land Commissioner and Comptroller. He retired from his railroad career in 1910.

Haugan was a partner and shareholder of the Chicago banking firm Haugan & Lindgren. He was a later a director the State Bank of Chicago. The town of Haugan, Montana in Mineral County, Montana was named for Hauman G. Haugan.

An invalid for several years before his death, Haugan died suddenly at his winter home in Pasadena, California, on January 29, 1921.

== Other sources ==
- Henschen, Henry S. (1905) A History of the State Bank of Chicago from 1879 to 1904 (Chicago: Lakeside Press)
