= Haugan (name) =

- Pronunciation: "How-gan”

Origin
- Origin: Old Norse haugr
- Meaning: hill, knoll, or mound
- Region of origin: Norway

Other names
- Variant forms: Haugen, Hauge

Haugan is a Norwegian surname which originated as a farm name. The name Haugan derives from the Old Norse word haugr which can be translated to mean hill, knoll, or mound. Other derivatives include Hauge, Haugen and Haugland, all common Norwegian surnames. Haugan may refer to:

== People ==
- Bernt B. Haugan (1862–1931), American minister, politician, and temperance leader
- Björn Haugan (1942–2009), Norwegian opera singer
- Dag-Are Haugan (born 1970), Norwegian musician
- Eirik Haugan (born 1997), Norwegian footballer
- Gregory T. Haugan (born 1931), American author and expert in the field of Work Breakdown Structure
- Gunnar Haugan (1925–2009), Norwegian character actor
- H. G. Haugan (1840–1921), American railroad and banking executive
- Helge Alexander Haugan (1847–1909), American banker
- Jørgen Haugan (born 1941), Norwegian author and lecturer
- Peter M. Haugan (born 1958), Norwegian Scientist and Director of the Geophysical Institute, University of Bergen
- Randolph Edgar Haugan (1902–1985), American author, editor and publisher
- Reidar Rye Haugan (1893–1972), American newspaper publisher
- Solveig Haugan (1901–1953), Norwegian movie actress
- Timon Haugan (born 1996), Norwegian alpine skier

== See also ==
- Haugan (disambiguation)
