= Dilbert Dunker =

Device for training pilots

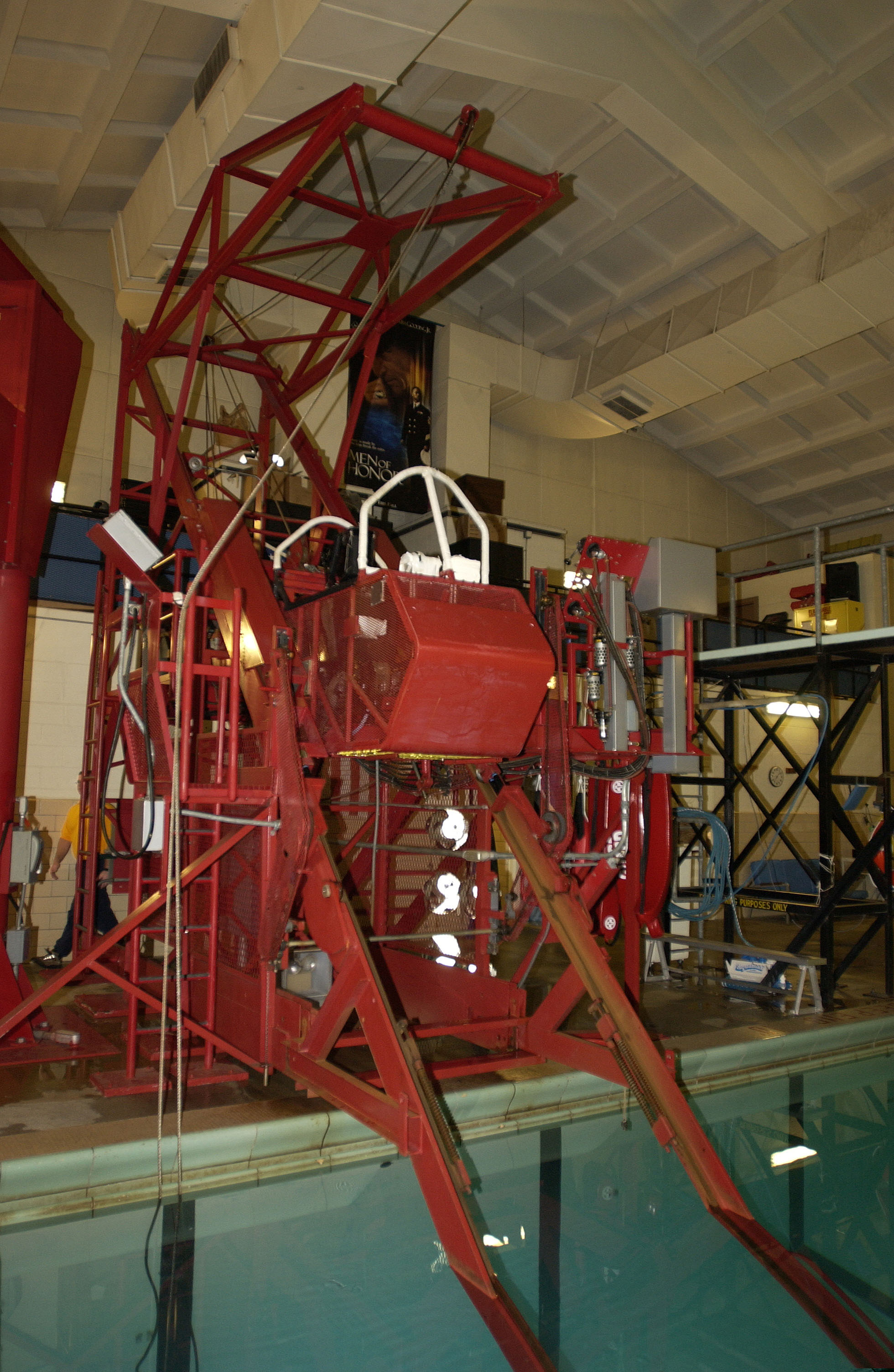
Dilbert Dunker in Naval Air Station Whidbey Island now replaced by a newer system for egress training

The Dilbert Dunker is a device for training pilots on how to correctly escape a submerged plane.

It was invented by Ensign Wilfred Kaneb, an aviation engineer at NAS Pensacola, in 1943–1944.

Originally named the "Underwater Cockpit Escape Device," the device was known since its earliest days as the "Dilbert Dunker" in reference to Dilbert Groundloop, a World War II-era cartoon character in Navy aviation training videos and posters who is incapable of doing things right.

The original Dilbert Dunker combined the forward fuselage of an SNJ Texan—including "all equipment in the cockpit that would hinder a pilot’s exit" (instrument panel, stick, and pedals)—with a 45 degree rail that sends the cockpit from a high stand at the deep end of the training pool; at the end of the run under water it flips over to simulate a water ditching. The cockpit would hit the water at 25 miles per hour (40 km/h) before inverting. The preflight student must detach the communication wire from the helmet, release the seat and shoulder harness, dive still deeper and swim away from the "aircraft" at a 45-degree angle to the surface for the purpose of assuming that the water around an actual situation has burning fuel on the surface.

The Dunker was still in use as of 1997, and a helicopter-specific version remains in service as of 2013, even though the original version has fallen out of service.

== In popular culture ==
- The device was featured in the 1982 film An Officer and a Gentleman, starring Richard Gere and Debra Winger.
- The device is used as a test for astronauts in the novel The Calculating Stars by Mary Robinette Kowal.

== See also ==
- Index of aviation articles
- Flight training
