= Howard Haugerud =

American government official (1924–2019)

Howard Edward Haugerud
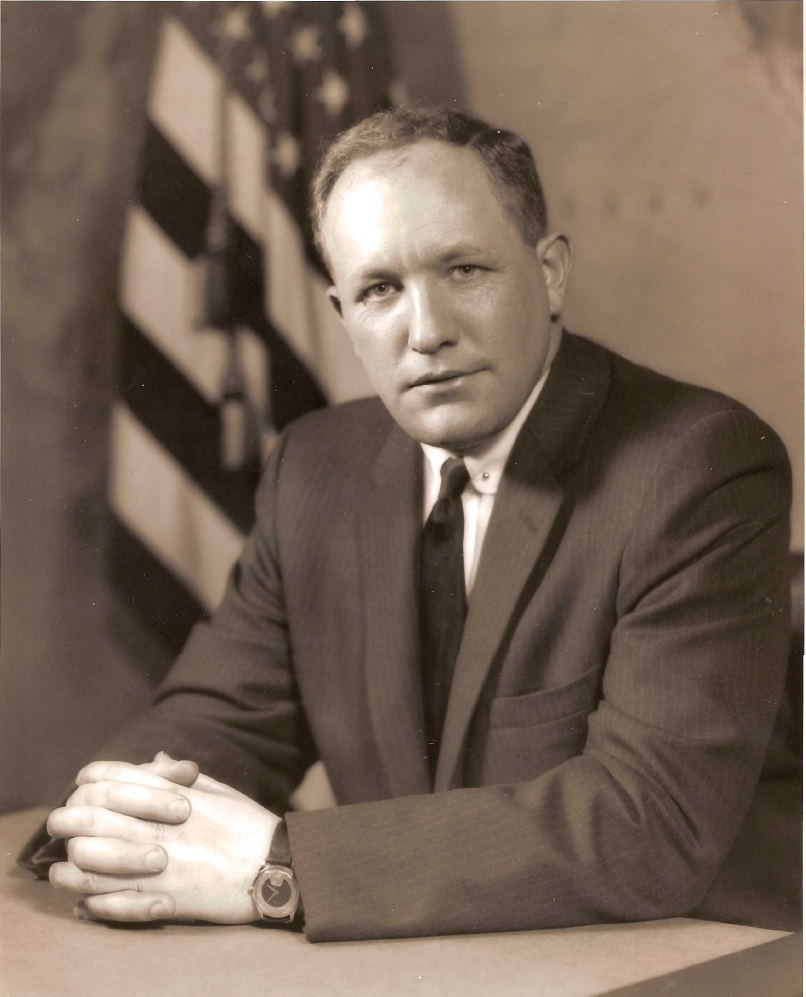
- U.S. Army photo 1961
- Born: August 22, 1924; Harmony, Minnesota, U.S.
- Died: January 23, 2019 (aged 94); Palm Springs, California, U.S.
- Education: Kansas State University; University of Minnesota; Harvard Business School
- Occupation: Government official
- Spouse: Tomajean Akers.

Howard Edward Haugerud (August 22, 1924 – January 23, 2019) was an American government official who served in presidentially appointed positions at the Department of Defense and the Department of State during the administrations of Presidents Kennedy, Johnson and Nixon. He later became the senior vice president of the Dana Holding Corporation, a managing director of the family-owned TASEA Investment and Development Company, CEO of Controlled Environment Systems, Chairman and CEO of the National Tribune Corporation, publisher and editor-in-chief of the Stars and Stripes newspaper, president of the Stars and Stripes Foundation and president of the real estate holding firm Trout Run, LLC.

== Career ==
=== Military ===
Haugerud served for eight years on active duty during World War II and Korea as an aviation cadet, pilot and unit commander with tours of duty in the U.S., Europe and the Far East. At the height of the Cold War, he headed the air section of the Reconnaissance Squadron assigned 24/7 to patrol the borders of Soviet occupied East Germany and Czechoslovakia.

=== Government ===
After leaving the military, Haugerud joined the staff of the late Senator Hubert H. Humphrey of Minnesota. In that position, he played a key role in drafting and gaining support for the first Wilderness Bill that established 9.1 million acres of federally protected areas that became the forerunner of the 623 million acre National Wilderness Preservation System. After working with Senator Humphrey, Haugerud joined the committee staffs of Senator Henry M. (Scoop) Jackson of Washington state and Senator John L. McClellan of Arkansas, working on national security and governmental reorganization matters. Along with the late J.K. Mansfield and Dr. Dorothy Fosdick, he participated in a study recommending major changes in the National Security Council, which were adopted in 1961 by the newly elected John F. Kennedy. In 1958, Haugerud was the President of the United States Senate Staff Club.

During this period, Haugerud also authored articles for national publications. His 1953 Harper's piece, The Unfortunate Taft Memorial, resulted in legislation being enacted to prohibit the building of future monuments to any senator or congressman on the Capitol grounds until they had been deceased a minimum of 50 years. In the more than half a century since that legislation became law, no legislator has been so honored.

While both were serving on Senator McClellan's Government Operations Committee staffs, Haugerud and the late Robert Kennedy became friends. As a result, when Kennedy became head of his brother's presidential election campaign organization in 1960, he asked Haugerud to join the group. Knowing that he had a close personal friendship with Senator McClellan, the conservative senior senator and dominate political power in Arkansas, Kennedy asked Haugerud to set up headquarters in Little Rock and to aid the campaign in Texas, Kansas, Oklahoma and Missouri.

During that period, Haugerud had the task of insuring mandatory access to the Arkansas voting apparatus, which was tightly controlled by the segregationist governor, Orville Fabus, and, at the same time, convince the governor not to endorse the Kennedy-Johnson ticket. Such an endorsement, right up to poll closing time in an election where the margin proved to be razor thin, could have cost Kennedy many hundreds of thousands of votes in large urban areas and thrown the victory to Nixon.

Shortly after the inauguration, President Kennedy nominated Haugerud to the post of Assistant Secretary of the Army for Manpower and Reserve Affairs. Assured of easy senate conformation, the Minnesotan was preparing to assume the new job when officials discovered the post had been eliminated during the last days of the Eisenhower administration.

A new position, that of Deputy Undersecretary of the Army for International Affairs was then created giving Haugerud responsibility for all army overseas interests, including the Administration of the Panama Canal Zone, the Panama Canal Company, Okinawa and the Ryukyu Islands. His domestic assignments also gave him responsibility to oversee the activities of U. S. Civil Defense and the U.S. Army Corps of Engineers. At that time, a special presidential order formulated by President Eisenhower was in force designating the Secretary of the Army as having exclusive authority over policies and operations concerning the Canal Zone and the Ryukyu Islands.

In one of his first actions, Haugerud formed a committee to study the return of Okinawa and the surrounding Islands to Japan under conditions that would permit continued U.S. use of the military bases. He appointed Dr. Carl Kaysen, then deputy director of the National Security Council to head the group and asked that they proceed to Naha. Within six weeks, Dr. Kaysen's committee presented recommendations so comprehensive that they remained little changed during years of negotiations from 1961 until 1971 when the final treaty with Japan was signed.

Shortly after taking office, Haugerud traveled to the Panama Canal Zone to inspect the Zone government and the Panama Canal Company. He found the company, charged with the operation of the legendary canal was being run efficiently, but under work rules differing little from those established when the project was completed in 1914. Under the guise of “security,” no Panamanian man or woman was permitted employment in positions other than as domestic help, or to reside within the ten mile wide strip of land that split the country from ocean to ocean. In the meantime, only American citizens were eligible for employment and they were being paid a 25% salary bonus based on the premise that the Zone was a hardship post. While assignment to the Zone was indeed a hardship in the early days of the Canal, by 1961 conditions had improved so as to be unrecognizable to former workers. Resentment among the native population was high and building, helped along by some thoughtless Americans who boasted they had lived and worked in the zone for 20 years and had never ventured over the line into largely destitute Panama. After reporting his findings to the Secretary of the Army and the President, Haugerud instituted programs to begin reducing the bonus payments, amend the security regulations and training Panamanians to fill substantive positions in the Canal Company work force.

During his tenure with the Army, Haugerud worked closely with Attorney General Robert Kennedy in his fight against organized crime, and was able to place a number of persons in the witness protection program. One such occasion, at the request of Kennedy, he arranged for the legendary mobster Joe Valacchi to be secretly sequestered at a military prison in New Jersey for some 18 months to keep him from being assassinated by gang figures who feared being implicated by his testimony. This assignment, at times proved, very difficult as Haugerud was requested to refrain from sharing knowledge of the effort with any of his colleagues or superiors at the Dept. of Defense.

A few weeks prior to his death, President Kennedy asked Haugerud to accept the position of Inspector General of Foreign Assistance at the Department of State as he was planning to name the incumbent to an ambassadorial post. After the president was assassinated, President Johnson decided not to move the sitting Inspector General, but supported congressional legislation elevating the position of Deputy Inspector General to that of the Inspector General, making the two leaders equal in rank. The congress quickly passed the provision and Haugerud was one of the earliest nominations sent to the Senate by the new president. At the time of his appointment, he was the youngest person to have attained the rank of Assistant Secretary of State.

At that time, the Office of Inspectors General of Foreign Assistance was one of the most powerful federal government activities. The unit held statutory inspection and evaluation authority over all U.S. foreign assistance programs undertaken by the various federal bodies. These included economic aid by the State Department and the Agency for International Development, The Department of Agriculture's Public Law 480 and the Food For Peace efforts, The Peace Corp, The Department of Defense military assistance programs, as wells as any overseas initiatives by the Departments of the Treasury, Commerce and independent agencies. Unlike any other Inspector Generals, past or present, Haugerud, and his partner, Ken Mansfield, held program suspension authority, and could halt the expenditure of funds even though such a measure was contrary to the orders of the Secretary of State or any cabinet officer. They also had their own independent congressional budget appropriation so were not beholden for funding to the State Department or to any of the agencies they inspected.

During the years 1963 to 1969, Haugerud traveled to a great many of the some 127 countries where the United States was sponsoring assistance programs. Vietnam, which was receiving huge shipments of commodities and arms, and where corruption was rampant, required much of his attention. One notable investigation revealed that one of the commodities being shipped by the U.S. to Vietnam appeared to be immensely popular. Hundreds of thousands of “rubber” soled shoes were being imported into Saigon each month for resale to Vietnamese citizens. These shipments, along with vast quantities of hair spray and liquor were being quickly cleared through ports jammed with vessels, some waiting for as long as 50 days to unload their cargos of arms, ammunition, foodstuffs and other material required to support the massive war effort.

A routine “end use” survey by Haugerud's inspectors turned up evidence that shipments of shoe manufacturing material was sufficiently large so as to enable every inhabitant of Vietnam to own several unique pair, yet they could not be found in the most likely places—on the feet of Vietnamese men, women or children. Unable to solve the mystery in Saigon, Haugerud ordered that a number of the shoes and samples of the chemical Unicel-100 used in their manufacture, be sent to a government laboratory where it was quickly determined the “rubber” shoes when melted down produced a highly explosive substance. The Unicel proved have the power close to that of TNT. The shipments were very quickly, and very quietly halted.

During this period, Haugerud's work was repeatedly praised on the floor of the House of Representatives and the United States Senate, with members of both bodies entering their remarks in the Congressional Record. In a 1966 New York Times op-ed article, legendary investigative reporter Felix Belair wrote that Mr. Haugerud “knows the ins and out of commercial skullduggery like the back of his hand.”

When President Nixon took office in 1969, he asked Haugerud to remain in his administration. In September 1969, due to his wife's cancer and the travel required for his position, Haugerud resigned. He then became the Chairman of the Foreign Affairs Executive Seminar, the U.S. government's most senior training institution. The Chairman of the Foreign Affairs Executive Seminar was the U.S. government's most senior training institution, staffed and funded by the Department of State, the Department of Defense, the Central Intelligence Agency, the Department of Treasury, the Department of Agriculture, the Agency for International Development and the Department of Commerce. Its students were senior officers from those organizations who were preparing to assume overseas posts as well as those returning from such assignments on their way to domestic positions in their respective branches. Mr. Haugerud had a wide latitude to prescribe the curriculum, select the faculty members and to recruit outside lecturers from government, industry and academe.

Many of the students became ambassadors; Chiefs of Military Missions; Commerce, Agriculture and Treasury Attaches, AID Mission Directors; and CIA Station Chiefs, which enabled Haugerud and his staff to convince hundreds of high level speakers from all walks of life to teach at the institution. Haugerud once said that during the 6 years he headed the organization, he could not recall a single instance where an invitation to lecture was not accepted.

=== Public sector positions ===
Haugerud resigned from government service at the age of 50 in 1974 in order to assume the position of vice president of government affairs for the Dana Holding Corporation of Toledo, Ohio.

Later, he was appointed the chairman and CEO of Controlled Environment Systems, a high tech energy and lighting company located in Rockville, Maryland. He also became a managing director of the TASEA Investment and Real Estate Development Corporation of Washington, D.C.

In 1993, Haugerud purchased controlling interest in the National Tribune Corporation of Washington D.C., which had published military and veterans newspapers since shortly after the Civil War. The corporation was on the verge of bankruptcy and had been cited by the U.S. Postal Service for failure to report accurate advertiser circulation figures for the Stars and Stripes newspaper. Haugerud became the Stars and Stripes publisher and editor-in-chief and served in these positions until he sold the publication to Iserved in 2000.

During his career, Haugerud also served as the Vice President of the Army Aviation Association and President of the McClellan Memorial Foundation.

== Awards ==
- Certificate of Merit, National Police Officers Association
- Decoration for Exceptional Civilian Service, Department of the Army, 1963
- Certification of Merit for Saving a Life, American National Red Cross

== Personal life ==
Haugerud was married to the former Tomajean Akers of Washington D.C. and Bal Harbour, Florida. They resided in Indian Wells, California. He died in Palm Springs, California in January 2019 at the age of 94, and his ashes were subsequently buried at Arlington National Cemetery on May 11, 2020. He had a penchant of bringing socks full of coins to his grandchildren.
