= Haugan & Lindgren =

Defunct American bank

Haugan & Lindgren was a bank headquartered in Chicago, Illinois, United States. The bank operated from December 8, 1879, until February 10, 1891, from quarters at No. 57 and No. 59 La Salle Street. The bank was a partnership of Helge Alexander Haugan, H. G. Haugan and John R. Lindgren. Haugan & Lindgren was a predecessor of the State Bank of Chicago.
