= Mikkel Sveinhaug =

Mikkel Sveinhaug (5 October 1873 – 18 August 1958) was a Norwegian farmer and politician for the Liberal Left Party.

He was born in Ringsaker Municipality as a son of farmers Johannes Furuberget and Anne Dobloug. He took education at Jønsberg Agricultural School in 1897, and owned the farm Sveinhaug in Ringsaker since 1907.

He was a member of the municipal council of Ringsaker Municipality for many years. He was a central board member of the Liberal Left Party from 1918 to 1923. He issued the small book Blandkorn fra Oplandene in 1927 and was a prolific writer in the liberal and conservative press, especially on agriculture in addition to politics. He contributed to Hamar Stiftstidende for over sixty years, and also wrote local history.

He died in August 1958.
