= Tove Welle Haugland =

Norwegian politician

Tove Welle Haugland (born 13 November 1989) is a Norwegian politician for the Christian Democratic Party.

She served as a deputy representative to the Parliament of Norway from Vest-Agder during the term 2017–2021. She hails from Øvrebø, but is an elected councillor in Kristiansand and was acting deputy mayor in 2018.
