= Per Theodor Haugen =

Norwegian actor (1932–2018)

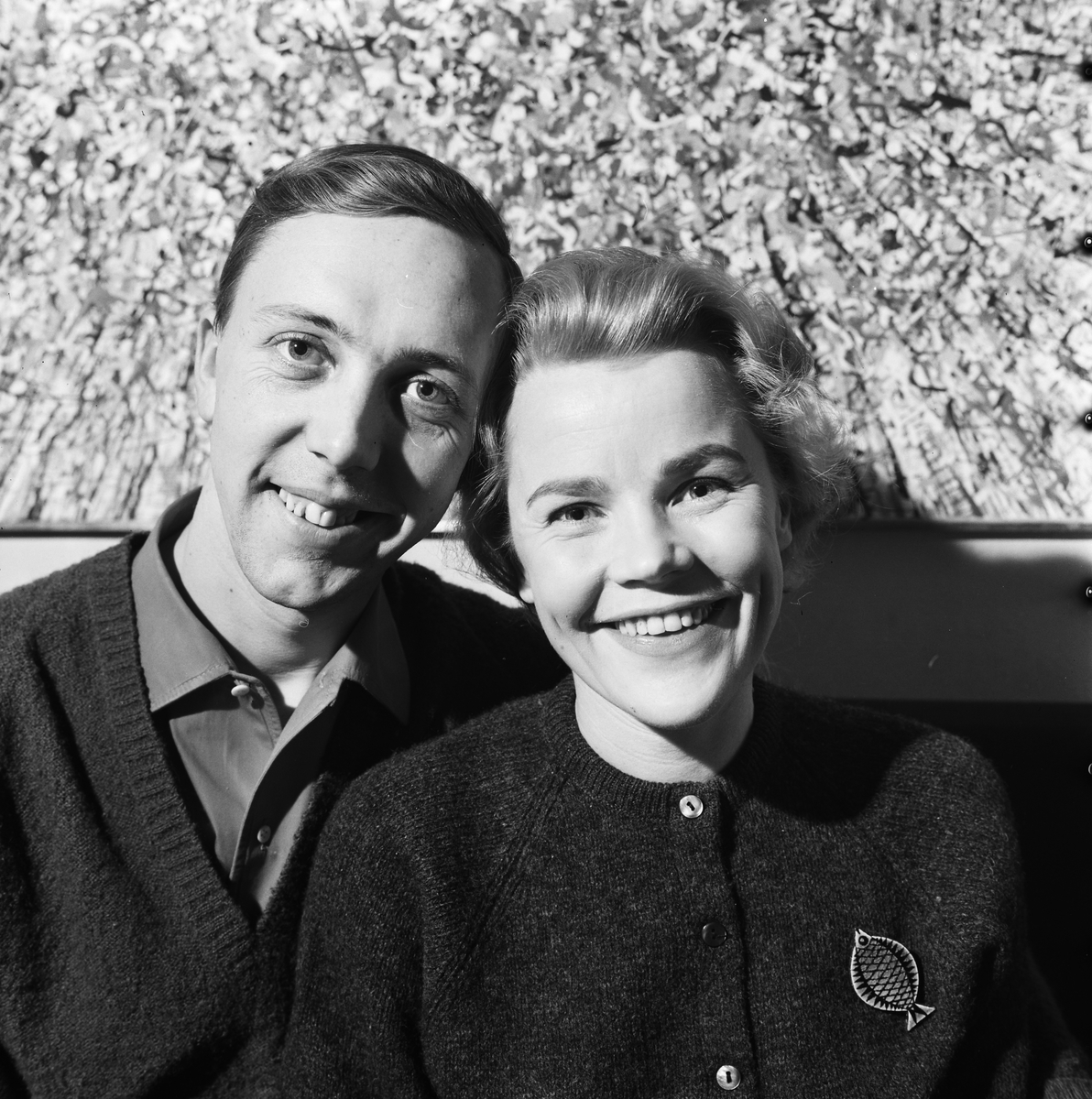
- Per Theodor Haugen with Sissel Sellæg in 1957
- Born: 8 October 1932
- Died: 14 October 2018 (aged 86)
- Resting place: Vestre Aker kirkegård
- Spouse(s): Sissel Sellæg

Per Theodor Haugen (8 October 1932 – 14 October 2018) was a Norwegian actor. Haugen was theater manager at Oslo Nye Teater from 1985 to 1988.

Haugen was born at Kongsberg. He was the son of Trygve Haugen (1897–1943) and his wife Hjørdis Wissestad (1904–60). At age 16 he became a student at Rogaland Theater in Stavanger. He had his stage debut in 1949 at Rogaland Teater. In 1959, he played the lead role in the movie Støv på hjernen (Dust on the Brain). Haugen also worked as director of Oslo Nye Teater from 1985 until 1989.

With his wife, actress Sissel Sellæg (1928–2014), he had a son Kim Haugen (born 1958), who also became an actor.
