= Helge Alexander Haugan =

American banking executive

Helge A. Haugan (October 26, 1847 – May 17, 1909) was an American banking executive in Chicago, Illinois. Haugan was a founding partner of Haugan & Lindgren and the founding president of the State Bank of Chicago.

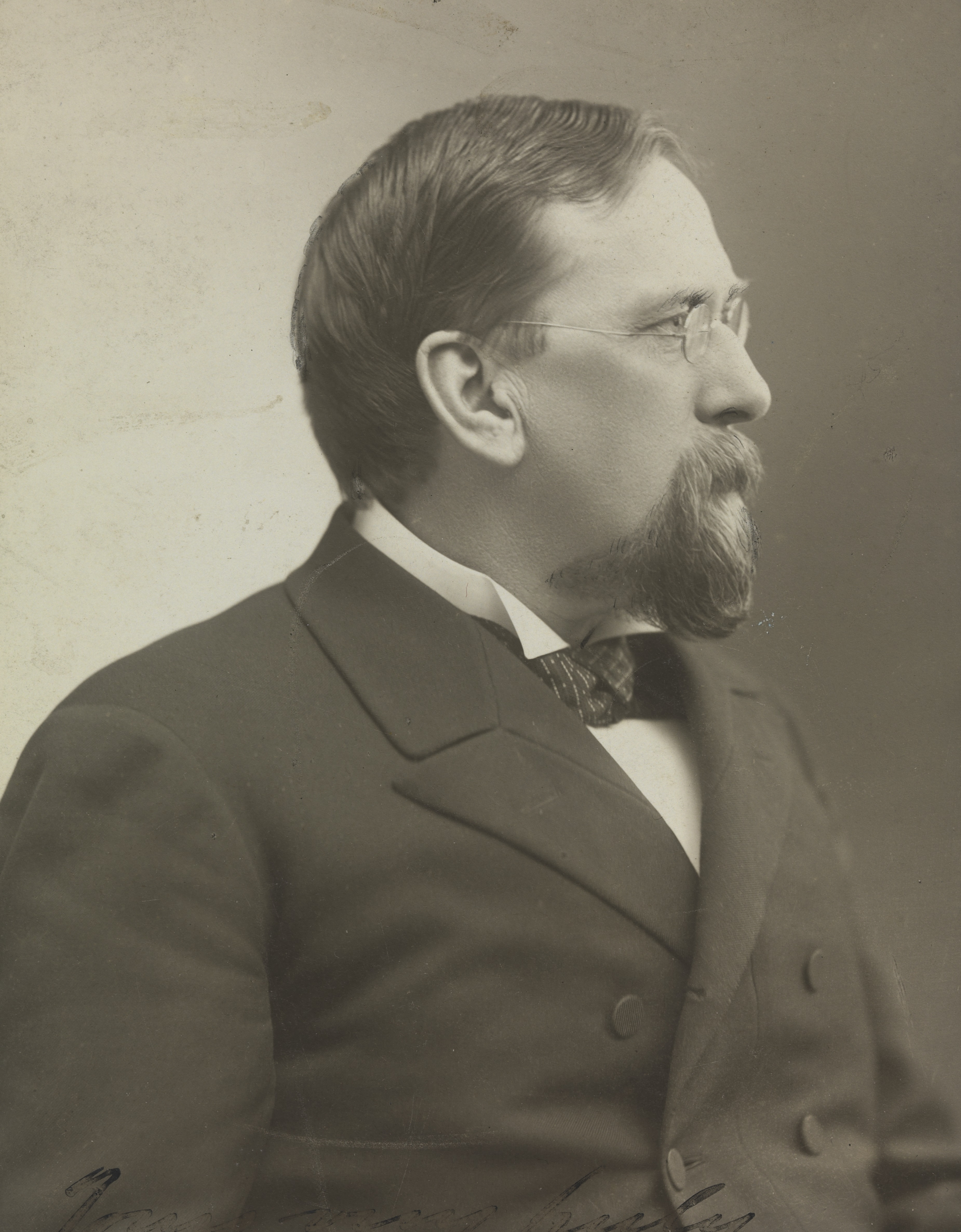
Helge Alexander Haugan

== Background ==
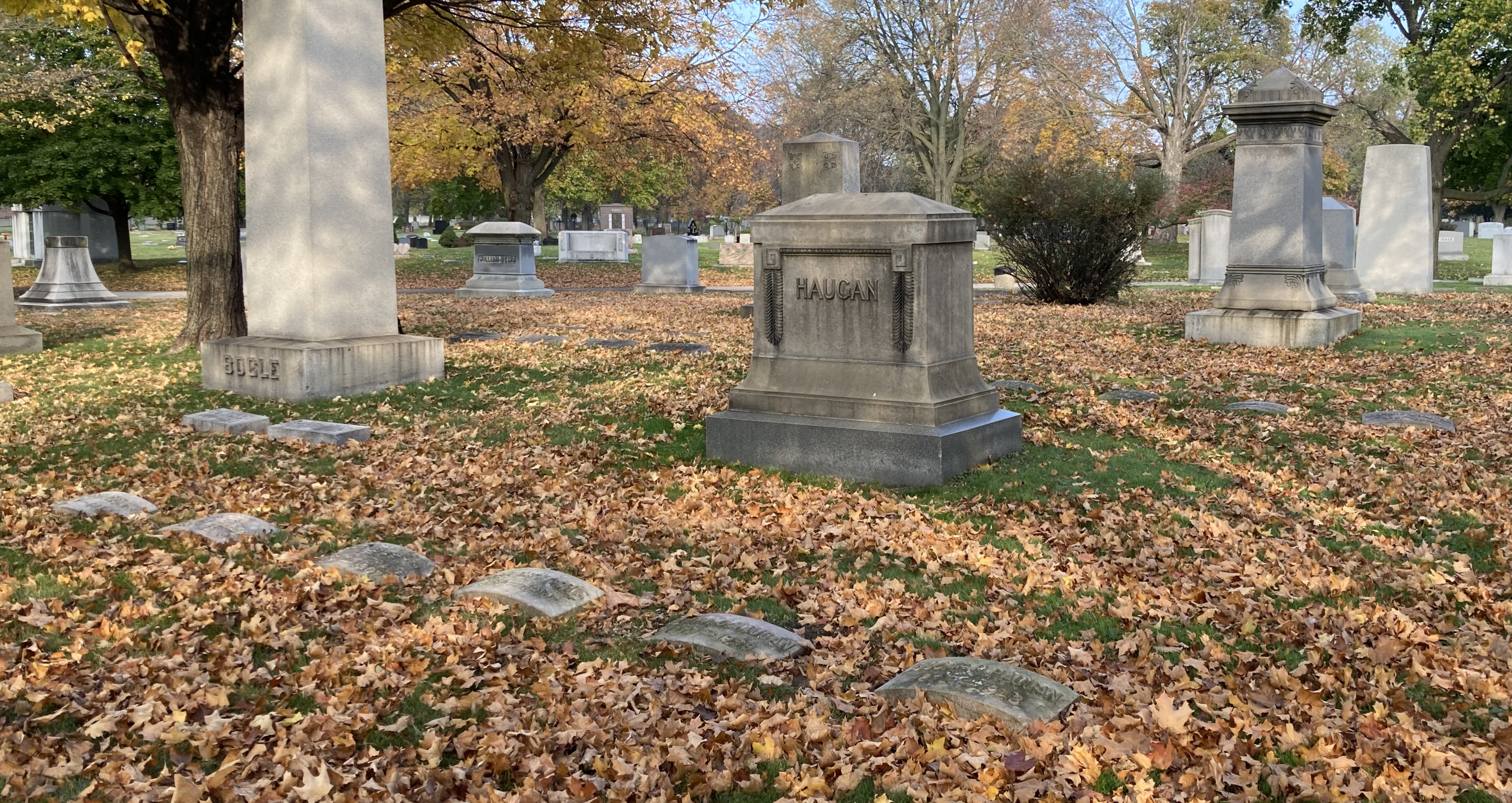
Haugan's grave at Rosehill Cemetery

Helge Alexander Haugan was born in Christiania, Norway, the younger son of Helge A. and Anna B. Haugan. In 1858, the Haugan family immigrated to Canada, settling in Montreal in 1859. In Montreal, Haugan learned the steam fitting and brass finishing trade.

== Career ==
Haugan came to Chicago in 1862 and continued in the plumbing business—initially as workman, and later as operator of his own plumbing shop on Milwaukee Avenue. In 1879, with John R. Lindgren, he founded the private banking firm of Haugan & Lindgren. This bank specialized in serving the growing population of Scandinavian-Americans in the Chicago area. In 1891, the bank was incorporated as the State Bank of Chicago. His elder brother, H. G. Haugan, was a major investor in both banking firms.

Helge Haugan died from heart failure at his home in Chicago on May 17, 1909. He was buried at Rosehill Cemetery.

Following his death, his son Henry Alexander Haugan became president of the bank. Both Haugan Elementary School and Haugan Middle School in Chicago Public Schools District 299 are named for Helge A. Haugan.

== Other sources ==
- Henschen, Henry S. (1905) A History of The State Bank Of Chicago From 1879 To 1904 (Chicago: Kessinger Publishing, LLC.)

== Related reading ==
- Strand, A. E. (1905) A History of the Norwegians of Illinois (Chicago: John Anderson Publishing Co.)
- Leonard, John W. (1905) The Book of Chicagoans: a biographical dictionary of leading living men of the City of Chicago ( Chicago: A. N. Marquis & Co.)
- Currey, J. Seymour (1912) Chicago, its History and its Builders, A Century of Marvelous Growth (Chicago: S.J. Clark Publishing Company)
