= State Bank of Chicago =

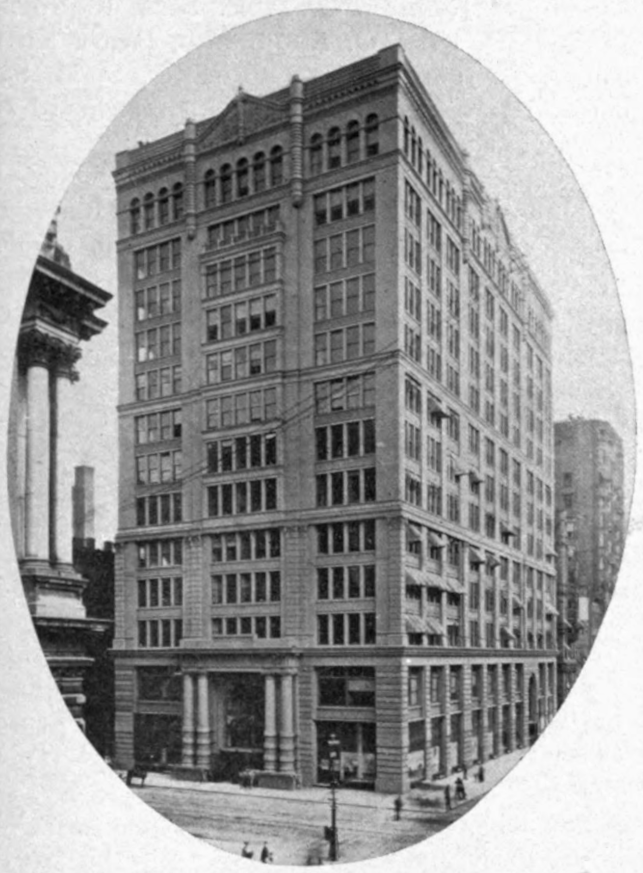
c. 1905

State Bank of Chicago was an American banking firm which conducted business under a state of Illinois charter issued on February 10, 1891. State Bank of Chicago operated from offices in the Chamber of Commerce Building located at the southeast corner of La Salle and Washington streets in Chicago, Illinois. State Bank of Chicago was a successor to the private banking partnership of Haugan & Lindgren, Bankers which had been in operation since 1879. Haugan & Lindgren had been housed at No. 57 and No. 59 La Salle Street, Chicago. That bank was founded by Norwegian born Helge Alexander Haugan and his partner John R. Lindgren. It had initially focused on the large population of Scandinavian residents within the Chicago area.

In 1929, Walter W. Head took over as president of State Bank of Chicago and guided through a merger with Foreman National Bank. All of the State Bank's assets were transferred to the Foreman National. The merger with Foreman National eventually made the remaining institution, the Foreman-State Bank, one of the three largest banks in Chicago. During June 1931, the Foreman-State Bank was acquired by the First National Bank of Chicago.
