= Harald Haugaard =

Danish violinist and composer

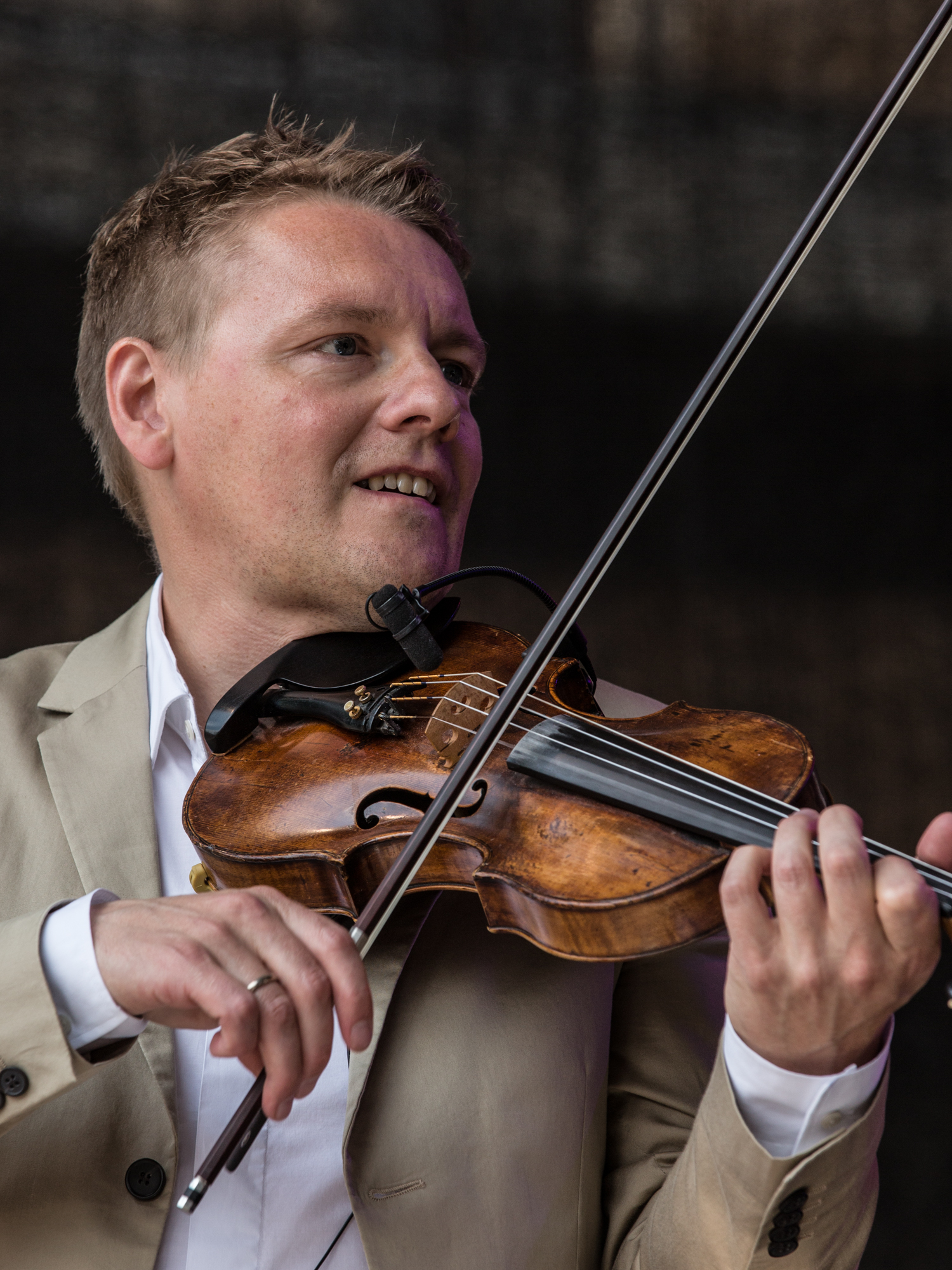

Background information
- Born: 1975 (age 49–50); Denmark
- Genres: Folk
- Occupation(s): Violinist, Composer
- Instrument: Violin
- Years active: c. 1994-present
- Labels: Pile House Records, Gateway Music

Harald Haugaard (born 23 February 1975) is a Danish violinist and composer raised on the island of Funen in Denmark. He is best known as a folk musician, having collaborated with musician Morten Alfred Høirup in the duo Haugaard & Høirup, and with folk singer Helene Blum. Together, they perform as the Helene Blum & Harald Haugaard Band.

== Career ==
Haugaard studied general music education at the Funen Music Conservatory in 1998. There, he was a lecturer of folk music education from 2000 to 2005. He also taught at the Norwegian Music College, the Vestjysk Music Conservatory, Ollerup Efterskole, and the Royal College of Music, Stockholm. In 2000, he played violin on the second studio album of the folktronica band Sorten Muld, entitled "III".

Together with Morten Alfred Høirup, he formed the duo Haugaard & Høirup in 1998. This act received numerous nominations and awards, winning the title of "Danish Folk Art Artist of the Year" and "Danish People's Composer of the Year" at the 2004 Danish Music Awards. He released his fourth solo album Den Femte Søster in 2011. This album earned Haugaard the "Instrumentalist of the Year" award, and the album, "The Danish People's Album of the Year" in 2012. He was also nominated for "Composer of the Year".

In 2009 he released a solo album entitled Burning Fields. Released by Pile House Records, it received five out of six stars by the music magazine GAFFA. I 2011 he released Den Femte Søster, which GAFFA gave four out of six stars.

In 2012 he joined the folk art festival BALTICA as artistic director with his youth ensemble. He also was an artistic director and teacher at the South Danish Folk Music School from 2012 to 2016.

Haugaard founded and directs two summer schools: Haugaard's International Fiddle School and Haugaard's West Denmark Fiddle School (in 2008 and 2015, respectively).

Haugaard collaborated with the folksinger Helene Blum, and toured with her through their act Helene Blum & Harald Haugaard Band. In 2015, they were nominated for "Singer/Musician of the Year" at the Danish Folk Music Awards.

== Personal life ==
Haugaard is married to fellow folk musician and collaborator, Helene Blum.

== Awards ==
- 2008 Danish Music Association's High Prize
- 2012 Odense Live Pris
- 2012 Danish Music Awards Folk Prizes "Danish Folk Album of the Year" and "Instrumentalist of the Year"
- 2 Place of the Deutschen Schallplattenkritik
- Europäischer Folkpreis "Eisener Eversteiner"

== Discography ==
=== Solo ===
- Burning Fields (2009)
- Den Femte Søster (2011)
- Lys og Forfald (2015)

=== With Haugaard & Høirup ===
- Duo For Violin Og Guitar (1999)
- Lys (2001)
- Om Sommeren (2003)
- Gæstebud / Feast (2005)
- Rejsedage / Traveling (2008)

=== Featured Artist ===
- III with Sorten Muld (2000)
