= Sjur Jarle Hauge =

Norwegian footballer and manager (born 1971)

Personal information
- Date of birth: 18 December 1971 (age 54)
- Place of birth: Norway
- Height: 1.80 m (5 ft 11 in)
- Position: Midfielder

Senior career*
Years	Team	Apps	(Gls)
- Haugar
- Bryne
1995–1999	Haugesund		
2000–2006	Torvastad		
2007–20??	Djerv 1919		

Managerial career
- 2000–2006: Torvastad (player-manager)
- 2007–20??: Djerv 1919 (player-manager)
- * Club domestic league appearances and goals

Sjur Jarle Hauge (born 18 December 1971) is a Norwegian football coach and former player.

He started his career in SK Haugar; and later went to Bryne. He joined FK Haugesund in 1995, and enjoyed a spell in the Norwegian Premier League in the seasons 1997 and 1998. He left ahead of the 2000 season to become player-coach at Torvastad IL. In 2007, he was hired in the same position at Djerv 1919.
