= Håvard Jostein Haugen =

Norwegian professor

Håvard J. Haugen (born January 23, 1975) is a Norwegian professor. He is Head of the Department of Biomaterials in Faculty of Dentistry at University of Oslo, Norway.

== Education ==
In 2021, Haugen completed his Master in Chemical Engineering at the Imperial College of Science, Technology and Medicine in London, United Kingdom. Haugen earned a doctoral engineering from the Technische Universitat Munchen in 2004. His PhD thesis title was "Development of an implant to heal gastro-oesophageal reflux diseases."

== Career ==
Haugen worked as a researcher in the biological group: "bioloeart gical hvalves" at Helmholtz Institute for Biomedical Engineering, RWTH Aachen in Germany. He worked as a researcher at the Centre for Tissue Engineering and Regenerative Medicine, Imperial College London in UK. Between 2001 and 2004, he worked at the Central Institute for Medical Engineering at the Technical University of Munich.

He was a Postdoctoral researcher at the Department of Biomaterials, Institute of Clinical Dentistry, University of Oslo from 2005 to 2009. Since 2014, he has been a professor and Head of Department of Biomaterials at University of Oslo.

== Research ==
Haugen`s research interest focuses on biomaterials and bone regeneration. His research areas include biomaterials science, medical devices, bone graft, dental materials and orthopaedics.

== Awards ==
In 2000, Haugen received The British Petroleum Prize in Chemical Engineering, London, UK. Three years later, he received The City and Guild Associateship Award in Chemical Engineering, London, UK. He won the German Innovation Award in Germany, in 2009.

== Organizational affiliations and recognition ==
Between 2012 and 2016, Haugen was the President of the Scandinavian Society for Biomaterials. He is the project manager and recipient of the Research Council of Norway funded research grant between 2022 and 2027, with project title: "Multispecies biofilm for investigate non-antibiotic therpies in dentistry (MISFAITH)".
