= Sissel Sellæg =

Norwegian actress (1928–2014)

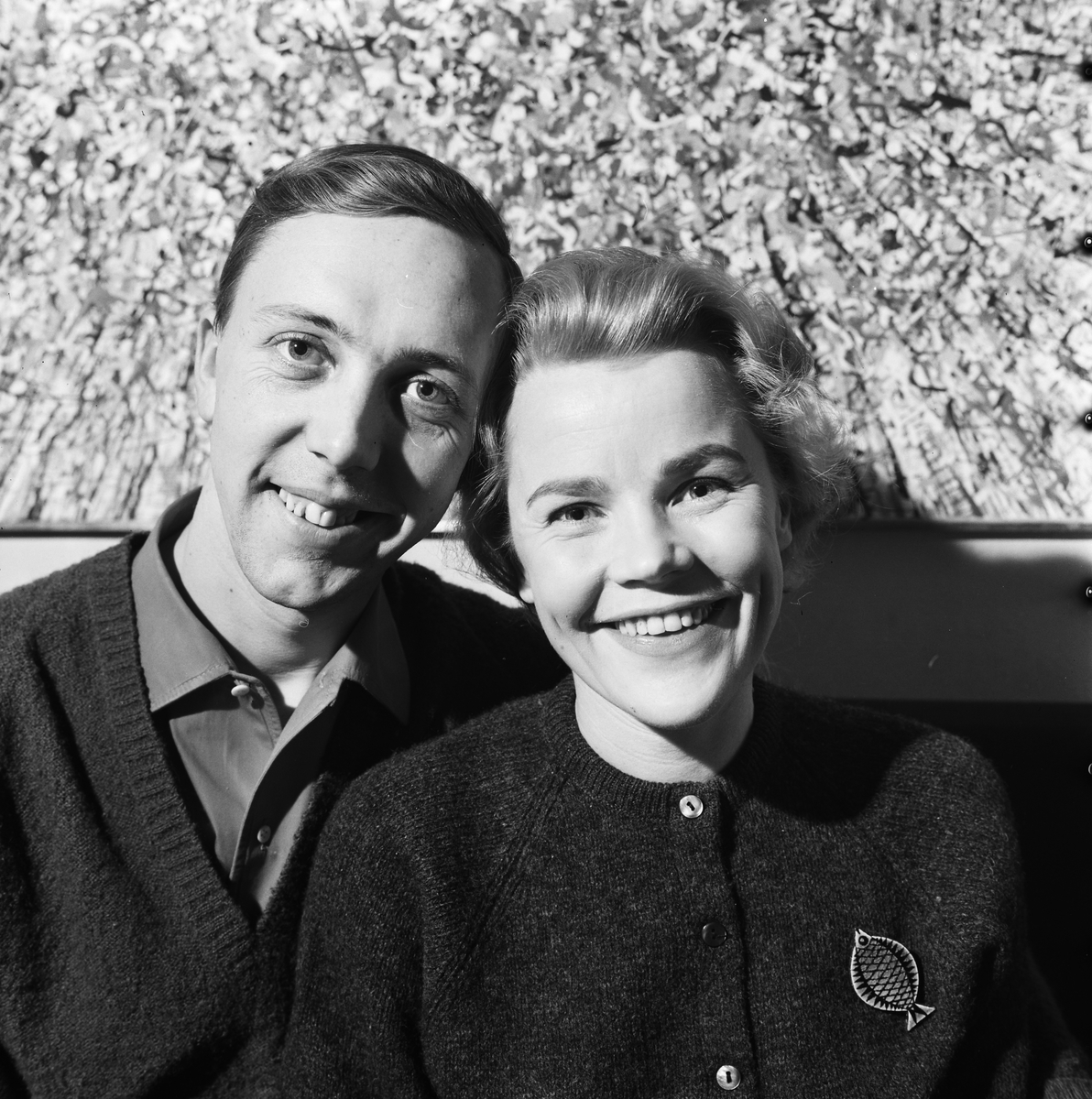
- Sellæg (right) with her husband, actor Per Theodor Haugen (left) in 1957.
- Born: 10 February 1928; Notodden, Norway
- Died: 5 January 2014 (aged 85); Oslo, Norway
- Other name: Sidsel Sellæg
- Occupation: Actress
- Years active: 1951–2005
- Spouse: Per Theodor Haugen
- Children: Kim Haugen

Sissel Sellæg (10 February 1928 – 5 January 2014) was a Norwegian actress.

She debuted in 1950 at the Studioteatret. She worked at Folketeatret in the years 1951–56, at Den Nationale Scene from 1959 to 1964 and at Oslo Nye Teater from 1967 to 1998. She was married to actor Per Theodor Haugen and was the mother of actor Kim Haugen.
