= Kim Haugen =

Norwegian actor

- Born: Kim Haugen; 24 September 1958 (age 67); Oslo, Norway
- Occupation: Actor
- Spouse: Nadia Hasnaoui (3 August 1991 - present)
- Children: 3
- Parent(s): Per Theodor Haugen (Father); Sissel Sellæg (Mother)

Kim Haugen (born 24 September 1958) is a Norwegian actor. He is a son of actors Per Theodor Haugen and Sissel Sellæg and is married to Nadia Hasnaoui. He made his stage debut at Den Nationale Scene in 1982. From 1985 he worked as an actor at Nationaltheatret (The Norwegian National Theatre). In 1992 he played the title role in Hamlet at Oslo Nye Teater.

He has also appeared for Fjernsynsteatret and participated in several television series, such as Vestavind from 1994 to 1995, Far og sønn from 2002 to 2004, and Ved kongens bord from 2005. In 2007, Haugen had a guest appearance in the successful Danish crime series The Killing. He participated in the films Buddy and Into the White.
