= Michael Hauge =

- Education: B.A.: University of Oregon; MEd: The University of Georgia; Sherwood Oaks Experimental College
- Occupations: story consultant, author, coach and lecturer
- Website: www.storymastery.com

Michael Hauge is an American story consultant, author, and lecturer who works with writers and filmmakers on their screenplays, novels, movies, and television projects. He is on the board of directors of the American Screenwriters Association and the advisory board for Scriptwriter Magazine in London.

== Career ==
He has coached writers, producers, actors and directors on projects for Will Smith, Julia Roberts, Jennifer Lopez, Kirsten Dunst, Charlize Theron and Morgan Freeman, as well as for every major studio and network. Hauge also works extensively with Hollywood executives, producers, agents and managers, helping them sharpen their story and development skills, with advanced principles of structure, character arc and theme to communicate a story's strengths and weaknesses, and work with writers to achieve a commercially successful screenplay.

== Books ==
Hauge is the best-selling author of Selling Your Story in 60 Seconds: The Guaranteed Way to Get Your Screenplay or Novel Read. He published in 1991 his book Writing Screenplays That Sell, and in 2011 he published his new 20th Anniversary edition of the same book. His seminar with Christopher Vogler, The Hero's 2 Journeys, has become one of the top-selling DVDs and CDs on story and screenwriting. Hauge has presented seminars and lectures to more than 80,000 participants throughout the US, Canada, and Europe.
