= Haugland =

Haugland may refer to:

== Places ==
- Haugland, Agder, a village in Kvinesdal municipality, Norway
- Haugland, Alver, a village in Radøy municipality, Norway
- Haugland, Askøy, a village in Askøy municipality, Norway
- Haugland, Drangedal, a village in Drangedal municipality, Norway
- Haugland, Lurøy, a village in Lurøy municipality, Norway

== See also ==
- Hogland
