= Haugan =

Haugan may refer to:

== People ==
- Haugan (name)

== Places ==
=== Iceland ===
- Hauganes, an Icelandic village

=== Norway ===
- Fru Haugans Hotel, a historic hotel in Helgeland, Norway
- Haugan, Røros, a Norwegian National Weather Station in Røros Municipality in Trøndelag, Norway
- Haugan, Tolga, a village in Tolga Municipality in Innlandet, Norway

=== United States ===
- Haugan, Montana, an unincorporated area in Mineral County, Montana
- Haugan Mountain, a mountain summit in Mineral County, Montana

== Other ==
- Haugan & Lindgren, an American banking firm
- Haugan House, an American open air exhibition
- Haugean, a Norwegian state church reform movement
