= Peter M. Haugan =

Norwegian oceanographer

Peter Mosby Haugan (born 28 July 1958) is a Norwegian Scientist and Director of the Geophysical Institute, University of Bergen. His research includes various aspects of physical oceanography focusing on the North Sea and Arctic Ocean. His research is often featured in the Journal of Geophysical Research as well as in Cicerone, a climate magazine published by CICERO - Center for International Climate and Environmental Research Oslo.

== Selected bibliography ==
- Haugan, P. M and F. Joos, (2004) Metrics to assess the mitigation of global warming by carbon capture and storage in the ocean and in geological reservoirs(Journal of Geophysical Research, Vol. 31. September 18, 2004)
- Haugan, P. M., and Alendal, G. (2005) Turbulent diffusion and transport from a CO_{2} lake in the deep ocean (Journal of Geophysical Research . September 21, 2005)
