= Hauge =

Hauge is a common Norwegian surname, commonly associated with farms. The name Hauge derives from the old Norse word haugr meaning hill, knoll, or mound. Derivatives also include Haugan and Haugen. Hauge may also refer to:

== People ==
- Alfred Hauge (1876–1901), Norwegian painter
- Alfred Hauge (1915–1986), Norwegian historian and author
- Earl Hauge (born 1940), American politician and Lutheran minister
- Cecilia H. Hauge (1905–1990), American nurse
- Eivind Hiis Hauge (born 1937), Norwegian physicist
- Frederic Hauge (born 1965), Norwegian environmental activist
- Gabriel Hauge (1914–1981), American bank executive, author and economist
- Hans Nielsen Hauge (1771–1824), Norwegian revivalist lay preacher
- Hans Nilsen Hauge (1853–1931), Norwegian politician
- Harald Hauge (born 1984), Norwegian football defender
- Jens Christian Hauge (1915–2006), Norwegian World War II resistance fighter and politician
- Jens Petter Hauge (born 1999), Norwegian footballer who plays for Eintracht Frankfurt
- Kjell Ove Hauge (born 1969), Norwegian shot putter and discus thrower, since head master
- Louis J. Hauge Jr. (1924–1945), United States Marine awarded the Medal of Honor posthumously
- Marie Hauge (1864–1931), Norwegian painter
- Michael Hauge, American script consultant, screenwriter, author and lecturer
- Olav H. Hauge (1908–1994), Norwegian poet
- Oscar Hauge (1868–1945), American politician
- Øystein Hauge (born 1956), Norwegian writer
- Ron Hauge, American television writer
- Rune Hauge (born 1954), Norwegian football agent
- Sakura Hauge (born 1987), Norwegian-Japanese handball player
- Sjur Jarle Hauge (born 1971), Norwegian football coach
- Terje Hauge (born 1965), Norwegian football referee

== Places ==
- Hauge, Denmark, a small village area in the city of Odense on the island of Funen in Denmark
- Hauge, Rogaland, the administrative centre of Sokndal municipality in Rogaland county, Norway
- Hauge, Østfold, a village in Hvaler municipality in Østfold county, Norway
- Hauge Church, a church in Lærdalsøyri in Lærdal municipality in Vestland county, Norway

== Other ==
- Hauge Synod, Norwegian Lutheran church body in the United States named after Hans Nielsen Hauge
- Björn at Hauge, Swedish king during the first half of the 9th century.
