= Alpha Lambda Zeta =

American LGBTQ sorority

- ΑΛΖ
- Founded: January 9, 2006; 19 years ago: Houston, Texas; Atlanta, Georgia
- Type: Service
- Affiliation: Independent
- Status: Active
- Emphasis: Masculine-identified lesbians
- Scope: National
- Motto: "Regal Women of Strength, Style and Versatility"
- Colors: Wine, Black, and Pearl
- Tree: Spruce
- Jewel: Opal
- Mascot: Rearing black stallion
- Publication: Alpha Almanac
- Philanthropy: Alpha Outreach Foundation, Lambda Action Network, V.O.I.C.E, and youth empowerment
- Chapters: 23 ?
- Headquarters: P.O. Box 162274; Atlanta, Georgia 30321-0274; United States
- Website: www.alphalambdazeta.com

Alpha Lambda Zeta (ΑΛΖ) Fraternity, Inc., an LGBTQ Greek-Lettered Organization, is a national non-collegiate service fraternity for masculine-identified lesbians who seek to promote positive images of the LGBTQ community through service to the community and political activism. The fraternity was founded in 2006 in Houston, Texas and Atlanta, Georgia.

== History ==
Alpha Lambda Zeta Fraternity was founded on January 9, 2006 in Houston, Texas and Atlanta, Georgia. It was founded to provide mentorship, personal growth, and leadership. Membership in Alpha Lambda Zeta is not exclusive to women of a particular race or age.

The fraternity operates nationally and has members in more than ten states, including Nevada, California, Georgia, Mississippi, Tennessee, Texas, Illinois, Maryland, New Jersey, Philadelphia, Ohio, Virginia, and Arizona.

== Symbols ==
The fraternity's colors are wine, black and pearl. Its jewel is the opal. Its plant is the Spruce and its mascot is the rearing black stallion. Its motto is "Regal Women of Strength, Style and Versatility". Its publication is the Alpha Almanac.

== Philanthropy ==
The fraternity's philanthropies include the Alpha Outreach Foundation, Lambda Action Network, V.O.I.C.E., and youth empowerment.

== See also ==
- List of LGBTQ and LGBTQ-friendly fraternities and sororities
