= History of North American fraternities and sororities =

The North American fraternity and sorority system began with students who wanted to meet secretly, usually for discussions and debates not thought appropriate by their schools' faculty. Now, they are used as social, professional, and honorary groups that promote varied combinations of community service, leadership, and academic achievement.

== History and development ==
Before 1776 in what would become the United States of America, collegiate student fraternal organizations that promoted scholarship, rhetoric, and ethical conduct existed only at Yale, the College of William and Mary, and the College of New Jersey. Thereafter, literary societies came into existence at virtually all the colleges and universities in America.

The Latin Societies were formal organizations, often with large assembly rooms. These organizations typically existed in pairs (two competing organizations on a campus), and took roughly half the students as members. At some colleges, students were assigned to a society. The society's literary exercises usually consisted of a debate, and the meetings were open to the public. In addition to debating, members could be assigned to compose and present original poems, essays, or fiction. Each society had distinctive meetings, with more or less political, social, or religious discussion.

These organizations also often adopted mottoes in Greek or Latin, and some had Greek letter names, such as Phi Kappa Literary Society at the University of Georgia. These organizations figure prominently in the development of fraternities and sororities because many early fraternities were considered private versions of the open Latin societies, and the format of the meetings was derived from the Latin society exercises. The Latin Societies thrived until the American Civil War. There were attempts to restore some of these organizations in the 1870s, but college fraternites became more popular after the war. A few Latin Societies did survive at the University of Georgia and Yale.

=== Phi Beta Kappa ===
Phi Beta Kappa society, founded on December 5, 1776, at the College of William and Mary in Williamsburg, Virginia, was the first fraternal organization in the United States of America, established the precedent for naming American college societies after the Greek letters.

The group consisted of students who frequented the Raleigh Tavern as a common meeting area off the college campus. There is a persistent rumor that a Masonic lodge also met in the same place, but the Freemason used a different building in Williamsburg. Whether the students organized to meet more freely and discuss non-academic topics, or to discuss politics in a Revolutionary society, is unknown; the earliest records indicate only that the students met to debate and engage in oratory, and on topics that would have been not far removed from the curriculum.

There were Latin-named literary societies at William & Mary, which were large debating societies. According to its founders, Phi Beta Kappa "had lost all reputation for letters, and [were] noted only for the dissipation & conviviality of [their] members." The new society was intended to be "purely of domestic manufacture, without any connection whatever with anything European, either English or German." The founders of Phi Beta Kappa declared that the society was formed for congeniality and to promote good fellowship, with "friendship as its basis and benevolence and literature as its pillars." At first, the society's only secrets were the mysterious letters used on the badge.

The society was given the motto, Philosophia Biou Kubernētēs or "Philosophy is the helmsman of life," now officially translated as "Philosophy is the guide of life". Greek was chosen as the language for the motto because Heath, "was the best Greek scholar in college."

One official historian of the society, William T. Hastings, and others, believes that the "S" and "P" on the badge, which meant Societas Philosophiae, Philosophical Society, was the original name of the Society and that the name Phi Beta Kappa only came to be taken as the society name over time. The heading on the original list of members states: "A List of the members, who have been initiated into the S.P. alias Phi Beta Kappa Society."

Later, in May 1777, two new signs of recognition were designed: "a salutation of the clasp of the hands, together with an immediate stroke across the mouth with the back of the same hand, and a return with the hand used by the saluted"; these new gestures were to distinguish Phi Beta Kappa members "in any foreign country or place."

By a stroke of good fortune, the society initiated a Yale student before disbanding at the advance of British forces. This student brought Phi Beta Kappa to Yale and Harvard, and from there the society was able to continue. As Phi Beta Kappa developed, it became a very influential association of faculty and select students across several colleges. The chapters became larger and focused on rhetoric and class elections while abandoning the close social bond that had defined the first chapter. Membership became more of an honor, with less involvement in the society's operations.

However, Phi Beta Kappa was very different from a typical college fraternity of today in that the membership was generally restricted to upperclassmen, if not seniors, and faculty who were made members earlier in their careers played an active role. The annual Phi Beta Kappa exercises at Yale were public literary exercises, with as many or more faculty members of the society as undergraduates.

=== Early groups ===
No other Greek letter student society was formed until the inception of Chi Delta Theta, a senior class society at Yale, in 1821. This group, like Phi Beta Kappa, became largely focused on literary debates and elections. Similar groups without Greek letter names (but still clearly inspired by the Greek language) had already been formed, like Hermesian, Adelphi, and Philalethean.

=== Collegiate fraternities develop ===
The advent of other Greek letter fraternities met the social needs or supposed needs of underclass men and left Phi Beta Kappa to give sole concern to scholarly affairs.

— Rev. E. B. Parsons, D. D.

The first national, secret, Greek letter social fraternity is considered to be the Kappa Alpha Society, established at Union College in Schenectady, New York, on November 26, 1825, by John Hart Hunter. Kappa Alpha Society's founders adopted many of Phi Beta Kappa's practices as Phi Beta Kappa had earlier been established at Union College in 1817, but instead formed their organization around fellowship, making the development of friendship and brotherhood their primary purpose. Students liked the organization, but the faculty opposed the small secret society.

Following the establishment of Kappa Alpha Society, an 1826 event shaped the public perception of fraternities for decades. In 1826, a man named William Morgan professed himself to be a high-ranking member of the Freemasons and said he intended to publish their secrets. He then disappeared and was assumed murdered or abducted. Public interest in the case led to a severe anti-secret society sentiment. Fraternity members faced expulsion and general suspicion, which only increased the secrecy of the early organizations.

Meanwhile, Union College was firmly established as the birthplace of the North American fraternity and sorority system when the Sigma Phi Society formed in March 1827, followed by Delta Phi in November. Kappa Alpha Society, Sigma Phi, and Delta Phi would constitute the so-called Union Triad.

A failed 1830 attempt by Kappa Alpha to expand to Hamilton College, coupled with Sigma Phi becaming the first "national" fraternity when it opened a satellite chapter at Hamilton in 1831, sparked the founding of Alpha Delta Phi, the first Greek letter fraternity founded outside Union. The trajectory of national expansion continued with Kappa Alpha Society's successful expansion to Williams College in 1833. The Mystical 7 at Wesleyan (1837) expanded to Emory University and the University of Georgia in the early 1840s, spreading the concept to the South, where for two decades before the Civil War, these kinds of organizations. The Mystical 7 was also the first society to initiate women as members.

The incidents involving William Morgan had not been forgotten, however, and Phi Beta Kappa came under public scrutiny. The increasing influence of the society came to seem undemocratic and contrary to the free flow of intellectual ideas in American academia; under great pressure, the undergraduate members at Harvard revealed the secrets of Phi Beta Kappa in 1831. In December 1832, the Scull and Bones Society was organized at Yale University among members of the senior class to carry on the legacy of Phi Beta Kappa. An unofficial but clear line was drawn between future secret societies and future Greek-lettered organizations.

In 1834, Delta Upsilon fraternity was founded at Williams College. Delta Upsilon was the nation's first open, non-secret fraternity; it still does not maintain secret admonitions, handclasps, or safeguard its rituals, which are open to public speculation. Delta Upsilon was founded to counter what was believed to be the unjust dominance by secret societies of the time over the student affairs at Williams College.

Beta Theta Pi was founded at Miami University in Oxford, Ohio, and held its first meeting on August 8, 1839. Beta Theta Pi was the first fraternity founded west of the Allegheny Mountains and was in some part established in response to the chartering of the west-most chapter of Alpha Delta Phi whose members had infiltrated the university's two literary societies, the Erodelphian Literary Society and Union Literary Society. Phi Delta Theta (1848) and Sigma Chi (1855), also founded at Miami University, emulated Beta Theta Pi's focus on establishing new chapters. These three constitute the famous Miami Triad. Zeta Psi, founded in 1847 at New York University, similarly pursued expansion. Meanwhile, Theta Chi was founded at Norwich University in Norwich, VT, and Sigma Alpha Epsilon was started at the University of Alabama in 1856.

Union College continued its role as the Mother of Fraternities by establishing Psi Upsilon (1833), Omicron Kappa Epsilon (1834), Chi Psi (1841) and Theta Delta Chi (1847). With this, Union College can claim the foundation of nearly half of the first thirteen secret social national fraternities in the United States.

Influences from Freemasonry would still be explicitly clear in the development of fraternities such as Phi Kappa Sigma, founded in 1850, and Delta Tau Delta, founded in 1858. Organizations such as Zeta Psi, Tau Kappa Epsilon, Psi Upsilon, and Delta Psi would be similarly influenced by and all without officially retaining any ties to Freemasonry.

As with men's fraternities, women's fraternities would largely be inspired or preceded by student societies with Greek-inspired names but without Greek letters. The Adelphean Society was established in 1851 at Wesleyan College in Macon, Georgia, making it the first secret society for collegiate women. The Philomathean Society (not associated with the Philomathean Society of the University of Pennsylvania) was also founded at Wesleyan College in 1852.

The first Greek letter women's fraternity, Chi Theta Delta, was formed in 1856 at Troy Female Seminary. It was formed by female students who had become so intrigued and impressed by the fellowship displayed by the men's fraternity Theta Delta Chi that they sought membership. This being an impossibility, the Delta chapter of Theta Delta Chi helped them form their group, which would last only a few years when Troy Female Seminary ceased being a board school. 1856 would also see the establishment of Kappa Sigma (not to be confused with Kappa Sigma fraternity) at Elmira College.

=== Golden Age of fraternities ===
The early 1860s were unsurprisingly uneventful for fraternities due to the American Civil War. Many colleges and undergraduate chapters temporarily closed during the war. Only one organization, Theta Xi, was founded (at Rensselaer Polytechnic Institute in 1864) as the first professional fraternity. During the war, the Morrill Act of 1862 was passed and led to new colleges, new educational opportunities, and greater student enrollment.

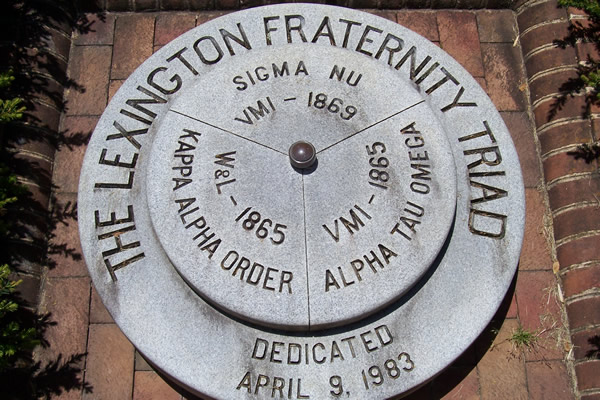

After the war, the system began encountering racial, religious, and gender diversity as new colleges were founded or reformed throughout the South and West. Growth in the fraternity system overall during this period would lead some to label the last third of the 19th century as "The Golden Age of Fraternities."

The so-called Lexington Triad would begin its formation when Alpha Tau Omega was founded in 1865 at the Virginia Military Institute. Fraternities being founded at military-oriented schools in the south was unsurprising given the recent end of the war. The founding of Kappa Alpha Order at Washington and Lee University in 1865 and Sigma Nu at VMI in 1869 would complete the triad.

Fraternity creation slowed after 1873 when the third of three secret societies was formed at Massachusetts Agricultural College. The existing fraternities would now seek to expand.

=== Sororities ===
The founding of the Adelphean Society (later Alpha Delta Pi) at Wesleyan Female College in 1851 marks the establishment of the first secret society for women. Shortly after came the Philomathean Society (later Phi Mu), also founded at Wesleyan in March 1852. In 1867, a society called I. C. Sorosis was founded as the nation's first women's fraternity at Monmouth College in Illinois, and later became known as Pi Beta Phi. It was the first to begin expanding to different chapters; although, a few unauthorized city chapters existed for a short time in its early years. In 1870, Kappa Alpha Theta was founded and was the first women's fraternity with Greek letters. The 1870s would also host the founding of Kappa Kappa Gamma in 1870, Alpha Phi in 1872, Delta Gamma in 1873, and Gamma Phi Beta and Sigma Kappa in 1874. In 1888 the women's fraternity of Delta Delta Delta was established at Boston University. The 1890s saw the founding of Chi Omega, now the nation's largest women's fraternal organization. With Alpha Xi Delta founding in 1893, Alpha Omicron Pi founded in 1897, and Sigma Sigma Sigma founded in 1898.

From the beginning, sororities had the difficult objective of proving the viability of coeducational studies. That women could perform academically as well as or better than men while maintaining the Victorian ideals of womanhood was a tall order. Sororities created high academic standards and monitored the social activities of their members from their inception.

Alpha Delta Pi would gain notoriety in 1851 as the first organization to be called a sorority. The terms sorority and women's fraternity are interchangeable, with some using one or the other in only formal or informal contexts. Social sororities were one of the few social outlets at most universities. While enrollment had opened to women at most institutions, student organizations like literary societies, student government, and other clubs continued restricting membership to male students. Intense curriculum and mandatory religious involvements limited free time, but the social sororities and social fraternities began a tradition of interaction. They would put together skits for entertainment, hold events for singing and waltzing after meetings, and host socials at the houses of local members.

=== Professional and honorary fraternities ===
Theta Xi was the first Greek-letter professional fraternity, but eventually became social. These groups would gain popularity before and increasingly after the turn of the 20th century. Membership in them could be coveted a great deal on some campuses. The membership requirements and purposes of honorary and professional fraternities would often overlap.

=== Religious fraternities and sororities ===
While the late 19th century held tremendous growth for the fraternity system, it was also a time of great discrimination against the minorities who were increasingly entering the universities. Informal agreements were often codified in bylaws to restrict membership only to white Christians (but not necessarily all Christian denominations).

Christianity was a huge part of college life at this time, and attending chapter was often mandatory. Training for the ministry was a common area of study. Jewish students could rarely gain entry into any fraternities, especially since one member could often block or blackball the initiation of any new member. There was also discrimination against Irish Catholics. Catholic students at Brown University established Phi Kappa Sigma (not to be confused with the national Phi Kappa Sigma) in 1889. Three Jewish students, upset at any idea of religious discrimination, established the non-sectarian Pi Lambda Phi at Yale University in 1895, with no discrimination against race, religion, or color. On the other end of the spectrum, fourteen students would form the Z.B.T. Society (later Zeta Beta Tau) in 1898, which was only open to Jewish students.

=== African-American fraternities and sororities ===
The establishment and evolution of fraternities and sororities for African-Americans partially mirrored the development of social fraternities and sororities. Literary societies with Greek letters came first: the Alpha Phi literary society was founded at Howard University in 1872. Sigma Pi Phi, a non-collegiate fraternity for professionals, was founded in 1904. Next there were unsuccessful attempts to create collegiate fraternities, such as Gamma Phi fraternity at Wilberforce University (first official campus recognition in 1923; a 1923 yearbook entry reported operation as early as 1905), Alpha Kappa Nu at Indiana University (formation attempted in 1903, but involved too few registrants to assure continuing organization), and Pi Gamma Omicron at Ohio State University (formation reported in the Chicago Defender in 1905; organization failed to receive school recognition). In 1906, Alpha Phi Alpha was formally established as a fraternity at Cornell University by Charles Cardoza Poindexter, although it operated as a social study club in 1905. The eight organizations that made up the National Pan-Hellenic Council until 1996 had formed over fifteen years. Black fraternities and sororities were based on existing fraternities and sororities, with cultural additions, including calls, open hand signs, and step shows; though social, many African-American fraternal organizations were formed with an emphasis on public service and civil rights.

=== 20th century ===
As fraternities grew, new issues appeared. Ideas over who should be a member (often tied to racial or cultural background) differed between chapters, which now spread throughout the United States and Canada. The undergraduate membership continued to grow, but alumni membership had grown more. Alumnae of women's sororities who had fought hard to help establish the idea of coeducation now questioned whether the new generation of women understood the value of the sorority.

There were always those against the fraternity and sorority system, but it was not until the early 20th century that a real impact was made on chapters at some campuses. In some cases, the development of fraternity and sorority housing is all that saved Greek life, as some universities had far outgrown their student housing capacities. Some campuses would ban Greek letter organizations, and others would study their merits. Detractors argued that the groups hurt intellectual development, affronted religion with secret oaths, and fostered inappropriate behavior. The validity of these claims varied between campuses and organizations; in many cases, the criticisms would remain, but without any significant action for decades

== Interfraternity organizations ==
The first attempt at organization between different fraternities began as a recommendation from members of Beta Theta Pi. Men representing thirteen fraternities officially and others present unofficially met in Philadelphia, Pennsylvania in 1883. They had intentions of having a conference the following year, and several edits formed the Inter-Fraternity Press Association. Neither of these two ideas lasted.

Kappa Kappa Gamma began attempting to organize sororities in 1890. The first Panhellenic Convention of Women's Fraternities was held in August 1891. Committees were created and reports were drafted, but little was done to continue the organization.

Fraternities and sororities united their efforts to make an appearance at the upcoming World's Fair in Chicago in 1893. They formed the Columbian Exposition Committee on Pan-Hellenism (the Chicago World's Fair was officially called the World's Columbian Exposition) and held many meetings on how to put together a joint exhibit. The exhibit never came together.

Alpha Phi would take the initiative to inspire the first Inter-Sorority Conference in 1902. The conference was attended by representatives from Delta Delta Delta, Gamma Phi Beta, Alpha Phi, Kappa Alpha Theta, Kappa Kappa Gamma, Delta Gamma, and Pi Beta Phi in Chicago. The next few conferences would establish rules and standards, such as a student-run Panhellenic Association on college campuses with two or more sororities, and the rotation of officers in these associations and the conference. The next decade would add many more sororities to the organization and it would be renamed the National Panhellenic Conference. The decade would also hold a new emphases on community service, standardized house rules, fairness policies for member recruitment, and an official stance against all secondary school sororities.

The social fraternities would create small Pan-Hellenic organizations in various cities in the late 1890s and early 20th century. George D. Kimball (Col. Z, University of Denver) of Sigma Alpha Epsilon would take the initiative and call for a true national Pan-Hellenic group during a meeting of the National Religious Education Association in Chicago in February 1909. The Inter-Fraternity Conference would begin with twenty-six organizations in November in New York City. Like the sororities, the conference would call for local student-run Inter-Fraternity Councils on college campuses with more than one member organization.

== See also ==
- College fraternities and sororities
- List of social fraternities
- List of social sororities and women's fraternities
