= List of LGBTQ and LGBTQ-friendly fraternities and sororities =

LGBTQ fraternities and sororities have existed since the 1980s, with Delta Phi Upsilon being established in 1985 and Delta Lambda Phi in 1986. These groups are intended to provide members with access to Greek life without fear of homophobic reprisal or behavior by fellow members, resulting from a history of homophobia within longer-established organizations.

In addition to groups established for LBGTQ members, in the 21st century, many Greek letter organizations have become LGBTQ-friendly by adopting diversity and inclusivity statements. In addition, some single-sex or co-educational fraternities and sororities have become gender-inclusive.

== LGBTQ sororities and women's fraternities ==
Following are LGBTQ-specific sororities and women's fraternities.

Name	Symbols	Chartered	Founding location	Type	Scope	Emphasis	Status	Ref.
Alpha Lambda Zeta	ΑΛΖ	2006	Houston, Texas and Atlanta, Georgia	Women's service fraternity; non-collegiate	National	masculine-identifying lesbians	Active	
Alpha Pi Delta	ΑΠΔ	June 28, 2010	Dallas, Texas	Service	National	lesbians of color	Active	
Beta Phi Omega	ΒΦΩ	2000	Tallahassee Florida	Sorority	National	feminine lesbian or bi-sexual of color	Active	
Eta Epsilon Gamma	ΗΕΓ	2009	Jackson, Mississippi	Social sorority	Local	Females at birth who identifies as cis-gender bisexual or lesbians	Active	
Eta Iota Mu	ΗΙΜ	2008	Jackson, Mississippi	Social women's fraternity	Local	Masculine identified cis-gender women and openly transgender males	Active	
Kappa Alpha Lambda	ΚΑΛ	2003	Clark Atlanta University	Service sorority, non-collegiate	National	feminine lesbian	Active	
Kappa Omega Omicron	ΚΏΟ	2009	Southern California	Women's professional fraternity, non-collegiate	National	masculine identified women and trans men	Active	
Kappa Theta Epsilon	ΚΘΕ	2009	Houston, Texas	Professional and entrepreneur sorority	National	Lesbian	Active	
Kappa Xi Omega	ΚΞΩ	2004	Florida	Service sorority; non-colliegiate	National	professional lesbians	Active	
Lambda Delta Lambda	ΛΔΛ	1988	University of California, Davis	LGBTQIA Sorority	National	queer, gay, lesbians, bisexuals, and all genders and sexualities	Active	
Omicron Epsilon Pi	ΟΕΠ	2000	Tallahassee, Florida	Sorority, non-collegiate	National	lesbians, particularly those of color	Active	
Sigma Omega Phi	ΣΩΦ	2008	Atlanta, Georgia	Women's service fraternity	National	masculine-identified lesbian	Active	
Zeta Theta Psi	ΖΘΨ	2013	Heidelberg University	Sorority	Local	female identifying students with non-gendered corollary (Zeta Embers)	Active	

== LGBTQ fraternities ==
Following are LGBTQ-specific fraternities.

Name	Symbols	Chartered	Formation location	Type	Scope	Emphasis	Status	Ref.
Beta Gamma Chi	ΒΓΧ	2009	Lincoln University (Pennsylvania)	LGBTQ fraternity, non-collegiate	National	queer-affirming siblinghood	Active	
Delta Lambda Phi	ΔΛΦ	1986	Washington, D.C;	Social fraternity, collegiate and non-collegiate	International	gay, bisexual, transgender, and progressive men	Active	
Delta Phi Upsilon	ΔΦΥ	1995	Houston, Texas	Social fraternity, non-colligiate	National	gay men of color	Active	
Kappa Psi Kappa	ΚΨΚ	2001	Tallahassee, Florida	Fraternity; non collegiate	National	progressive men of all sexual orientations	Active	
Sigma Epsilon Omega	ΣΕΩ	2007	University of California, Berkeley	Gay and queer fraternity	Local	all genders	Active	
Sigma Phi Beta	ΣΦΒ	2003	Arizona State University	Society fraternity	National	All who identify as male, gay, straight, bisexual, and transgender men	Active	

== Organizations for all genders ==
The following Greek letter organizations are gender-inclusive, meaning they accept male, female, trans, non-binary, etc. people into their membership. This list does not include organizations that self-define as co-educational; although such groups may well be gender-inclusive in practice, they have yet to modify their policies and language to be inclusive at the institutional level.

Name	Symbols	Chartered	Founding location	Type	Scope	Gender	Status	Ref.
Alpha Delta Phi Society	ΑΔΦ	1992	Various	Literary society	National	gender-inclusive	Active	
Euglossian Society	ΕΥΓ	1913	Heidelberg University	Greek society	Local	queer, trans and gender inclusive	Active	
Gamma Rho Lambda	ΓΡΛ	2003	Tempe, Arizona	Social sorority	National	LGBT-founded originally for "women and transgender individuals"; changed in 2019 to be inclusive of any gender identity	Active	
Lambda Alpha Lambda	ΛΑΛ	2018	Florida Atlantic University	service LGBTQ+ diaternity	Local	gender inclusive	Active	
Lambda Delta Xi	ΛΔΞ	2014	Kutztown University of Pennsylvania	service LGBTQ diaternity	Local	gender inclusive	Active	
Nu Delta	ΝΔ	1977	Massachusetts Institute of Technology	Fraternity	Local	all gender identities	Active	
Phi Sigma Pi	ΦΣΠ	1916	University of Central Missouri	Honor Fraternity	National	gender-inclusive	Active	
Th Delta Sigma	ΘΔΣ	2001	University at Buffalo	Multicultural fraternity	National	gender-inclusive	Active	
Theta Pi Sigma	ΘΠΣ	2005	University of California, Santa Cruz	"Frarority"	National	queer, gender-neutral	Active	
Sigma Omicron Rho	ΣΟΡ	2009	University of Virginia	Diaternity	Local	LGBTQ+ and allied gender-inclusive	Active	
Zeta Delta Xi	ΖΔΞ	1987	Brown University	Fraternity	Local	all-gender	Active	

== LBGTQ-inclusive Greek letter organizations ==
The following fraternities and sororities have adopted LGBTQ-inclusive policies at the national or institutional level. These policies are openly shared and are specific, rather than general non-discrimination statements.

Name	Symbol	Chartered	Founding location	Type	Scope	Policy	Ref.
Alpha Chi Omega	ΑΧΩ	1885	DePauw University	Women's fraternity, social	International	open to any individual who identifies as a woman and trans woman, any sexual preference	
Alpha Delta Pi	ΑΔΠ	1851	Wesleyan College	Sorority, social	International	open to any individual who identifies as a woman, including trans women	
Alpha Epsilon Phi	ΑΕΦ	1909	Barnard College	Sorority, Jewish social	National	open to any individual who identifies as a woman, regardless of the gender assigned at birth	
Alpha Gamma Delta	ΑΓΔ	1904	Syracuse University	Sorority, social	International	open to women of any sexual orientation and any individual who identifies as a woman	
Alpha Omicron Pi	ΑΟΠ	1897	Barnard College	Sorority, social	International	open to any individual who identifies and lives as a woman with any sexual orientation	
Alpha Sigma Tau	ΑΣΤ	1899	Eastern Michigan University	Sorority, social	National	open to women and transgender persons who identify as women with any sexual orientation	
Alpha Xi Delta	ΑΞΔ	1893	Lombard College	Sorority, social	National	open to any individual who identifies and lives as a woman with any sexual orientation	
Acacia		1904	University of Michigan	Fraternity, social	International	inclusive of gender identity or expression or sexual orientation	
Delta Delta Delta	ΔΔΔ	1888	Boston University	Sorority	International	open to any individual who identifies and lives as a woman or any sexual orientation	
Delta Gamma	ΔΓ	1873	Lewis School for Girls	Women's fraternity, social	International	open to any individual who identifies as a woman and any sexual orientation	
Delta Phi Epsilon	ΔΦΕ	1917	New York University Law School	Sorority	International	explicitly open to trans and non-binary individuals	
Delta Tau Delta	ΔΤΔ	1858	Bethany College	Fraternity, social	International	explicitly inclusive of individuals who identify as "gay, bisexual-transgender and any other non-heteronormative sexual orientations, gender expression, or genre identities"	
Delta Upsilon	ΔΥ	1834	Williams College	Fraternity	International	explicitly welcomes any individuals who identify as male, transgender men, and men of any sexual orientation	
Gamma Phi Beta	ΓΦΒ	1874	Syracuse University	Sorority	International	open to any individual who identifies as a woman	
Kappa Alpha Theta	ΚΑΘ	1870	DePauw University	Sorority	International	open to any individual who identifies as a woman	
Kappa Delta	ΚΔ	1897	Longwood University	Sorority	National	open to any individual who identifies as a woman and women of any sexual orientation	
Kappa Kappa Gamma	ΚΚΓ	1870	Monmouth College	Sorority	International	open to any individual who identifies as a woman and women of any sexual orientation	
Omega Delta Phi	ΩΔΦ	1987	Texas Tech University	Fraternity, multicultural	National	inclusive of all men, regardless of assigned sex at birth	
Phi Omega	ΦΩ	1962	Cornell University	Sorority, social	National	female-identifying and non-binary	
Phi Sigma Sigma	ΦΣΣ	1913	Hunter College	Sorority	International	open to any individual who identifies as a woman with any sexual orientation	
Pi Lambda Phi	ΠΛΦ	1895	Yale University	Fraternity	International	explicitly inclusive of gay and transgender men	
Psi Upsilon	ΨΥ	1833	Union College	Fraternity	International	open to any individual	
Sigma Chi	ΣΧ	1855	Miami University	Fraternity, literary and social	International	open to men of any sexual orientation	
Sigma Delta Tau	ΣΔΤ	1917	Miami University	Sorority, social	International	open to any who identify and live as a woman of any sexual orientation	
Sigma Phi Chi	ΣΦΧ	2001	Austin College	Sorority, Christian and social	Local	inclusive and LGBTQ+ friendly	
Sigma Sigma Sigma	ΣΣΣ	1898	Longwood University	Sorority, social	International	open to any individual who identifies as a woman	
Tau Kappa Epsilon	ΤΚΕ	1899	Illinois Wesleyan University	Fraternity, social	International	explicitly inclusive of gay and transgender men	
Theta Phi Alpha	ΘΦΑ	1912	University of Michigan	Sorority, social	National	explicitly open to trans women and any individual who identifies as a woman	
Zeta Alpha Delta	ΖΑΔ	2007	Oxford, Mississippi	Fraternity, non-collegiate	National	inclusive men of all sexual orientations, male-identified individuals	
Zeta Omega Eta	ΖΩΗ	2003	Trinity College	Sorority, coed feminist	Regional	inclusive and LGBTQ+ friendly	
Zeta Tau Alpha	ΖΤΑ	1898	Longwood University	Sorority	International	open to individuals who consistently identify and live as a woman of any sexual orientation	

== See also ==
- College fraternities and sororities
- Cultural interest fraternities and sororities
- List of social fraternities
- List of social sororities and women's fraternities
