= Gamma Rho Lambda =

American LGBTQ collegiate sorority

- ΓΡΛ
- Founded: November 20, 2003; 22 years ago Arizona State University
- Type: Social
- Affiliation: Independent
- Status: Active
- Emphasis: LGBTQ+
- Scope: National
- Motto: "Truth in tolerance, knowledge through diversity, bonds of unity, strength in trust"
- Colors: Purple and Black
- Symbol: Wolf
- Flower: Sunflower
- Mascot: Wolf
- Publication: The Wolf's Howl
- Philanthropy: Trevor Project
- Chapters: 7
- Members: 300 active 700 lifetime
- Nickname: GRL
- Logo
- Headquarters: PO Box 352367; Los Angeles, California 90035; United States
- Website: www.gammarholambda.org

Gamma Rho Lambda (ΓΡΛ) is a social, college-based sorority for lesbian, gay, bisexual, transgender, non-binary, and allied students and allies. Gamma Rho Lambda has been referred to as the first national multicultural lesbian sorority; however they are inclusive of all gender identities including cisgender women and men, trans women, trans men, and gender variant people of all sexualities and racial identities. As of 2026, GRL consists of five active chapters and one provisional chapter across five states, with an active collegiate and alum membership of over 100.

== History ==
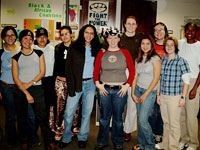
Eleven of the twelve founders of Gamma Rho Lambda

Gamma Rho Lambda, Alpha chapter, was founded in the Fall of 2003 by 12 original members at Arizona State University in Tempe, Arizona. The sorority was initially created because the founding president and members wanted an organization similar to the GBTQ-focused fraternity on campus, Sigma Phi Beta.

=== 2005 to 2010 ===
In 2005, Gamma Rho Lambda began the daunting task of expanding nationally, as Alpha chapter had been approached by several interested women on other campuses in the United States. Over the course of the next year, Gamma Rho Lambda worked to expand to these campuses, functioning in a national and local capacity at the same time.

In 2006, with enough alum members to support a national council, Gamma Rho Lambda National Sorority became independent of Alpha chapter. Since then, the national sorority has been working on expansion, adjusting to the needs of its chapters and members, and bettering the community overall through these efforts.

The sorority expanded to San Diego State University and Georgia Southern University. University of Missouri became a colony. San Diego State University gained chapter status as Beta chapter. Kansas State University became a colony. California State University, Northridge, University of California, Los Angeles, Purdue University and SUNY Albany became colonies. University of Missouri colony disbanded from Gamma Rho Lambda to focus more on political involvement. Kansas State University gained chapter status as Delta chapter and Purdue University gained chapter status as Eta chapter.

=== 2010 to 2015 ===
Gamma Rho Lambda rapidly expanded during this time. Northern Arizona University, SUNY Albany, University of Houston, UC Berkeley, UC Riverside, Ball State, Tulane University, Iowa State, American University, and University of Iowa became colonies of Gamma Rho Lambda and later chapters Additionally UL Lafayette and UT Austin were inducted as colonies.

=== 2016 to 2020 ===
UL Lafayette and UT Austin were initiated as Sigma and Tau chapter, respectively. Longwood University, University of Arizona, and Missouri S&T were initiated as colonies in the spring of 2016 and became chapters in early 2017. Also, Bowling Green State University and Ohio State University were inducted as colonies in the fall of 2016 and became chapters in late 2017. Virginia Commonwealth University was inducted as a colony in 2018.

In January 2021, Gamma Rho Lambda National Sorority opened its membership to people of any and all gender identities, thereby including cisgender men in their siblinghood.

The provisional chapter at University of Nevada, Reno was inducted as Alpha Delta chapter in February 2021.

=== 2020 to present ===
The National Council established its National Foundation in 2023, to provide support for and promote the overall success of members of the Gamma Rho Lambda family through financial support, educational programming to promote academic success and professional development, and leadership development opportunities.

Also in 2023, Gamma Rho Lambda formally voted to adopt "Omega" as the chapter designation for siblings who have passed away, and removed it from being used in any Chapter, Line, or Class name.

As with many organizations, Gamma Rho Lambda struggled during the COVID pandemic. As campuses shut down and Greek organizations were unable to recruit, chapters fought diligently to stay connected, involved, and active. However, many of the smaller chapters were unable to weather the storm, and were forced to close after great recruitment and retention efforts. The organization went from 20 to just 8 chapters between 2020 and 2023.

Alpha Epsilon Chapter at George Mason University was inducted in fall of 2019 and founded in June 2021. They were persistent in completing the provisional chapter process, which was delayed by the COVID-19 pandemic.

In 2026, Gamma Rho Lambda welcomed their first provisional chapter since COVID-19 at Ohio University. They have several campuses working on forming interest groups.

Gamma Rho Lambda's current focus as a national organization is on strengthening its foundation and building up its currently existing chapters. As of Fall 2023, the organization is opening 1-2 interest groups a semester for active chapters so that the national council can provide the stability and support chapters need to be successful. Today, Gamma Rho Lambda active membership (including Alum & Collegians) consists of over 100 active members.

Gamma Rho Lambda National Sorority's main philanthropic efforts are to benefit The Trevor Project, but chapters also work individually with local non-profits and philanthropic organizations, collectively raising thousands of dollars and creating awareness in their communities.

== Symbols ==
The sorority's official colors are purple and black. The wolf is its mascot. Its flower is the sunflower. Its motto is: "Truth in tolerance, knowledge through diversity, bonds of unity, strength in trust."

The Lambda symbol was adopted by the New York City's Gay Activists' Alliance in the 1970s during the Stonewall Riots. Since then, the Lambda has spread as a symbol for the gay liberation movement. Because of its history, the Lambda was chosen to be a letter in the sorority's Greek name.

Visible symbols in the coat of arms include the lioness, the bear, the unicorn, the crown of thorns, the metal crown, the Isle of Lesbos symbol with shaking hands, the upside down black triangle, the Eye of Horus, the hand, the sword, the ivy leaf vine, the elephant tusk, and the cinquefoil.

== Governing Council ==
The sorority's day-to-day business activities are overseen by the National Governing Council, which acts as the board of directors. It was established in 2006, when there were enough alum members to support a National Council. Since then, Gamma Rho Lambda National Sorority has been working not only on expansion, but also adjusting to the needs of our chapters and members and bettering the community overall through these efforts. Council currently consists of 10 active alum members, who are elected every year (or appointed, should a position be vacant at the time of election). All active chapters and provisional chapters also have a mentor assigned to them for support.

== Chapters ==
Active chapters are indicated in bold. Inactive chapters are indicated in italic.

| Chapter | Charter date and range | Institution | Location | Status | Ref. |
|---|---|---|---|---|---|
| **Alpha** | November 20, 2003 | Arizona State University | Tempe, Arizona | Active | |
| Beta | 2008–2018 | San Diego State University | San Diego, California | Inactive | (Note: Started as a colony in 2005.) |
| Gamma | | Georgia Southern University | Statesboro, Georgia | Inactive | |
| Delta | 2009–2022 | Kansas State University | Manhattan, Kansas | Inactive | |
| Epsilon | 2010–2021 | California State University, Northridge | Northridge, California | Inactive | (Note: Started as a colony in 2008.) |
| Zeta | 2010–2021 | University of California, Los Angeles | Los Angeles, California | Inactive | (Note: Started as a colony 2009.) |
| Eta | November 20, 2010 – 2023 | Purdue University | West Lafayette, Indiana | Inactive | |
| Theta | 2011–2022 | Northern Arizona University | Flagstaff, Arizona | Inactive | (Note: Started as a colony in 2010.) |
| Iota | 2011–2016 | University at Albany, SUNY | Albany, New York | Inactive | |
| Kappa | November 12, 2011 - 2025 | University of Houston | Houston, Texas | Active | |
| Lambda | April 27, 2012 - 2025 | University of California, Berkeley | Berkeley, California | Active | |
| Mu | 2012–2016 | University of California, Riverside | Riverside, California | Inactive | |
| Nu | November 16, 2013 – 202x ? | Ball State University | Muncie, Indiana | Inactive | |
| Xi | 2013–2022 | Tulane University | New Orleans, Louisiana | Active | |
| **Omicron** | April 19, 2014 | Iowa State University | Ames, Iowa | Active | |
| Pi | | American University | Washington, D.C. | Inactive | |
| **Rho** | April 25, 2015 | University of Iowa | Iowa City, Iowa | Active | |
| Sigma | 2015–2021 | University of Louisiana at Lafayette | Lafayette, Louisiana | Inactive | |
| **Tau** | April 30, 2015 | University of Texas at Austin | Austin, Texas | Active | |
| Upsilon | 2017–2018 | Missouri University of Science and Technology | Rolla, Missouri | Inactive | (Note: Started as a colony in 2016.) |
| Phi | April 22, 2017 - 2025 | University of Arizona | Tucson, Arizona | Inactive | |
| Chi | April 22, 2017 – 2023 | Longwood University | Farmville, Virginia | Inactive | |
| Psi | 2017–2022 | Ohio State University | Columbus, Ohio | Inactive | |
| Alpha Beta | 2017–2021 | Bowling Green State University | Bowling Green, Ohio | Inactive | |
| Alpha Gamma | 2019–2021 | Virginia Commonwealth University | Richmond, Virginia | Inactive | |
| Alpha Delta | 2021–2022 | University of Nevada, Reno | Reno, Nevada | Inactive | |
| **Alpha Epsilon** | June 2021 | George Mason University | Fairfax, Virginia | Active | (Note: Started as a colony in the fall of 2019. Its installation was delayed because of the COVID pandemic.) |
| **OU Provisional Chapter** | Spring 2026 | Ohio University | Athens, Ohio | | |
| **Omega** | 2017 | | | Active | (Note: Reserved for deceased members.) |

== See also ==
- List of LGBT fraternities and sororities
- List of social sororities and women's fraternities
