= Sigma Phi Beta =

Sigma Phi Beta (ΣΦΒ) may refer to:

- Sigma Phi Beta (fraternity), a college fraternity for gay, straight, bisexual, and transgender men.
- Sigma Phi Beta (sorority), a defunct sorority belonging to the National Panhellenic Conference.
