= List of African-American fraternities and sororities =

African-American fraternities and sororities are social organizations that predominantly recruit Black college students. These organizations provide a network that includes both undergraduate and alumni members. These fraternities and sororities were typically founded by Black American undergraduate students, faculty, and leaders at various institutions in the United States.

== Fraternities ==
Following is a list of active and inactive African American fraternities, in charter date order.

Name	Charter date and range	Founding location	Type	Affiliation	Status	Ref.
Prince Hall Freemasonry	September 29, 1784	Boston, Massachusetts	Freemasonry, community-based	Independent	Active	
Grand United Order of Odd Fellows in America	1843	New York City, New York	General, community-based	Independent	Active	
International Order of Twelve Knights and Daughters of Tabor	1872	Independence, Missouri	General coed, community-based	Independent	Active	
Grand United Order of True Reformers	1873	Alabama and Kentucky	General and benevolence, community-based	Independent	Inactive	
Knights of Pythias of North America, South America, Europe, Asia, and Africa	1880	Vicksburg, Mississippi	Benevolence society, community-based	Independent	Active	
Improved Benevolent and Protective Order of Elks of the World	1897	Philadelphia, Pennsylvania	General, community-based	Independent	Active	
Alpha Kappa Nu	November 1903 – 1911	Indiana University	Social, collegiate	Independent	Inactive	
Sigma Pi Phi	1904	Philadelphia, Pennsylvania	Professional, community-based	Independent	Active	
Pi Gamma Omicron	January 1, 1905–c. 1950	Ohio State University	Social, collegiate	Independent	Inactive	
Gamma Phi	March 1, 1905 – before 1950	Wilberforce University	Social, collegiate	Independent	Inactive	
Alpha Phi Alpha	December 4, 1906	Cornell University	Social collegiate	NPHC	Active	
Kappa Alpha Psi	January 5, 1911	Indiana University Bloomington	Social, collegiate	NPHC, NIC	Active	
Omega Psi Phi	November 17, 1911	Howard University	Social, collegiate	NPHC	Active	
Chi Delta Mu	January 30, 1913	Howard University	Professional, community-based	Independent	Active	
Phi Beta Sigma	January 9, 1914	Howard University	Social, collegiate	NPHC, NIC (former)	Active	
Tau Delta Sigma	January 1914 – before 1934	Howard University School of Law	Professional, collegiate	Independent	Inactive	
Cusp and Crown	December 9, 1921	Howard University Professional Schools	Professional, collegiate	Independent	Inactive	
Sigma Delta Tau	November 17, 1934	Terrell Law School	Professional, collegiate	Independent	Active	
Gamma Tau	March 16, 1934–c. 1950s	Howard University	Social, collegiate	Independent	Inactive	
Epsilon Nu Delta	1942	Worsham College of Mortuary Science	Professional, community-based	National Funeral Directors and Morticians Association	Active	
Alpha Chi Pi Omega	October 27, 1945	Washington, D.C.	Professional, community-based	Independent	Active	(Note: This is both a fraternity and sorority.) (Note: Was called Alpha Phi Omega from 1945 to 1952.)
Wine Psi Phi	March 2, 1959	Howard University	Social, collegiate and graduate	Independent	Active	(Note: In later years, many chapters operated as a co-ed "frarority". Today, only one graduate chapter remains active.)
Groove Phi Groove	October 12, 1962	Morgan State University	Social, collegiate	Independent	Active	
Nu Gamma Alpha	1962	Howard University	Social, collegiate and graduate	Independent	Active	
Iota Phi Theta	September 19, 1963	Morgan State University	Social, collegiate	NPHC, NIC	Active	
Phi Eta Psi	April 5, 1965	Mott Community College	Social, collegiate	Independent	Active	(Note: All college chapters are now inactive, although the national alumni association is still active.)
Phi Delta Psi	March 21, 1977	Western Michigan University	Social, collegiate	Independent	Active	
Chi Alpha Phi	1979	Lincoln University	Coed service, collegiate and community	Independent	Active	
Sigma Phi Rho	April 26, 1979	Wagner College	Social, collegiate	Independent	Active	
Epsilon Gamma Iota	1984	Prairie View A&M University	Professional, collegiate	Independent	Active	
Delta Psi Chi	April 24, 1985	University of Wisconsin—Milwaukee	Social, collegiate	Independent	Active	
Phi Omicron Psi	February 16, 1986	Virginia Commonwealth University	Social, collegiate	Independent	Inactive	
Beta Phi Pi	April 6, 1986	Western Illinois University	Social and Service, collegiate	Independent	Active	
Alpha Nu Omega	November 3, 1988	Morgan State University	Christian, collegiate	Independent	Active	(Note: Operates as both a fraternity and a sorority under the same name and constitution.)
Megisté Areté	1989	Eastern Illinois University	Christian, collegiate	Independent	Active	
Upsilon Phi Upsilon	March 31, 1990	Southern University	Service, collegiate	Independent	Active	
Pi Psi	November 22, 1993	Michigan State University	Social, collegiate	Independent	Inactive	
Nu Gamma Psi	1994	Plymouth, North Carolina	Social, community-based	Independent	Active	
Phi Rho Eta	August 22, 1994	Southern Illinois University	Social, collegiate	Independent	Active	
Phi Sigma Chi	November 16, 1996	City Tech College	Social, collegiate	Independent	Inactive	
Gamma Phi Eta	November 17, 1996	Georgia Southern University	Social, collegiate	Independent	Inactive	
Men of God	1999	Texas Tech University	Christian, collegiate	Independent	Active	(Note: Founded by a group of men who talked about God at a Step Show. MOG performs a yearly Step Show filled with mimes, dancers, and singers in honor of its beginning. MOG has grown but prefers to remain small, limiting the number of members in each chapter.)
Gamma Beta Chi	November 15, 2002	Fort Lauderdale, Florida	Service, collegiate	Independent	Active	
Nu Alpha Nu	2006	Alabama State University	Service, collegiate	Independent	Active	
Delta Phi Delta	January 18, 2000	University Park, Illinois	Professional, community-based	Independent	Active	
Eta Kappa Tau	March 2000	Alabama A&M University	Professional, collegiate	Independent	Active	
Nu Rho Sigma Eta Beta Mu	2005–2018	Cleveland, Ohio	Professional, coed, community-based	Independent	Inactive	
Delta Omicron Omega	April 13, 2007	Jackson State University	Professional, collegiate	Independent	Active	
Delta Iota Mu	2008		Professional, community-based	Independent	Active	
Phi Iota Phi	2009	Columbia, South Carolina	Professional, community-based	Independent	Active	
Alpha Tau Mu	September 2, 2009	Tuskegee University	Service, coed collegiate	Independent	Active	
Gamma Xi Phi	October 7, 2010	Ramapo College	Professional, community-based	Independent	Active	
Delta Mu Chi	September 22, 2014	Howard University	Professional, collegiate	Independent	Active	
Sigma Alpha Gamma	December 31, 2015	United States	Professional, community-based	Independent	Active	
Theta Nu Psi	December 6, 2016	Langley Air Force Base	Professional, community-based	Independent	Active	
Beta Nu Theta	2017	University of North Carolina at Chapel Hill	Coed service, collegiate	Independent	Active	
Mu Phi Psi	June 17, 2017	United States	Professional, community-based	United Federation of Military Greek Organizations	Inactive	
Psi Delta Tau	February 13, 2017	Alabama	Professional, community-based	Independent	Active	
Chi Gamma Kappa	January 22, 2017	Georgia	Service, community-based	Independent	Active	(Note: Members must be enrolled in college, have a college degree, or professional certification in her chosen career and live in Georgia, Alabama, Florida, Tennessee, Mississippi, Louisiana, North Carolina or South Carolina)
Psi Delta Tau	February 13, 2017	Alabama	Professional, community-based	Independent	Active	
Alpha Omega Phi	March 10, 2017	West Philadelphia, Pennsylvania	Professional, community-based	United Federation of Military Greek Organizations	Active	
Omega Xi Omega	January 18, 2018	United States	Professional, community-based	Independent	Active	
Alpha Lambda Psi	April 6, 2018 – 2018; June 30, 2020	Sumter, South Carolina	Professional, community-based	United Federation of Military Greek Organizations	Active	
Psi Rho Phi	April 3, 2019	Dallas, Texas	Professional, community-based	Independent	Active	
Phi Delta Pi	2020	Douglasville, Georgia	Professional, community-based	Independent	Active	(Note: Was previously called Pi Delta Phi Veterans Fraternity.)
Phi Gamma Phi	July 23, 2020	Gardner, Kansas	Professional, community-based	Independent	Active	
Xi Gamma Phi	2021	Kansas City, Missouri	Professional, community-based	Independent	Active	
Tau Rho Beta	December 18, 2002	United States	Professional, collegiate and community-based	Independent	Active	

== Sororities ==
Following is a list of active and inactive African American sororities and women's fraternities, in charter date order.

Name	Charter date and range	Founding location	Type	Affiliation	Status	Ref.
Alpha Kappa Alpha	January 15, 1908	Howard University	Social, collegiate	NPHC	Active	
Delta Sigma Theta	January 13, 1913	Howard University	Social, collegiate	NPHC	Active	
Zeta Phi Beta	January 16, 1920	Howard University	Social, collegiate	NPHC	Active	
Epsilon Sigma Iota	November 4, 1920	Howard University School of Law	Professional, collegiate	Independent	Active	
Rho Psi Phi	1922	Howard University Medical School	Professional, collegiate	Independent	Inactive	
Sigma Gamma Rho	November 12, 1922	Butler University	Social, collegiate	NPHC	Active	
Phi Delta Kappa	May 23, 1923	Jersey City, New Jersey.	Professional, education	Independent	Active	
Iota Phi Lambda	June 1, 1929	Chicago, Illinois	Professional, collegiate	Coalition of Black Business Sororities	Active	
Lambda Pi Alpha	1930	Meharry Medical College School of Nursing	Professional, community-based	Independent	Active	
Chi Eta Phi	October 16, 1932	Freedman's Hospital School of Nursing	Professional, community-based	Independent	Active	
Lambda Kappa Mu	January 19, 1937	Manhattan, New York	Professional, community-based	Coalition of Black Business Sororities	Active	
Eta Phi Beta	October 1942	Lewis Business College	Professional, collegiate	Coalition of Black Business Sororities	Active	
Tau Gamma Delta	1942	Lewis Business College	Social, community-based	Independent	Active	(Note: Sorority was formed as Phi Gamma Delta Sorority in 1942. Its name changed to Tau Gamma Delta Sorority Inc. on October 17, 1951.)
Gamma Phi Delta	February 28, 1943	Lewis Business College	Service, collegiate and graduate	Coalition of Black Business Sororities	Active	
Beta Pi Sigma	February 1945	Los Angeles, California	Professional, community-based	Independent	Active	
Alpha Chi Pi Omega	October 27, 1945	Washington, D.C.	Professional, community-based	Independent	Active	(Note: This is both a fraternity and sorority.) (Note: Was called Alpha Phi Omega from 1945 to 1950.)
The Links	November 9, 1946	Philadelphia, Pennsylvania	Social and service, community-based	Independent	Active	
Alpha Gamma Pi	1963	United States	Professional, community-based	Independent	Inactive ?	
Zeta Delta Phi	1962	Bronx Community College	Service, collegiate	Independent	Active	(Note: Sorority started as Houseplan (Zeta Delphi) in 1962 and was incorporated as Zeta Delta Phi Sorority in 1964.)
Alpha Pi Chi	January 7, 1963	Chicago, Illinois	Service, community-based	Independent	Active	(Note: Its founders were all associated with Alpha Gamma Chi. Members are mostly African American professionals.)
Swing Phi Swing	April 4, 1969	Winston-Salem State University	Social, collegiate	Independent	Active	
Theta Sigma Upsilon	1979	United States	Professional, community-based	Independent	Inactive	
Eta Phi Sigma	1981	United States	Professional, community-based	Independent	Inactive	
Kappa Psi Epsilon	September 24, 1982	Rutgers University–Newark	Social, collegiate	Independent	Active	
Elogeme Adolphi	October 17, 1987	Bradley University	Christian, collegiate	Independent	Active	
Alpha Nu Omega	November 3, 1988	Morgan State University	Christian, collegiate	Independent	Active	(Note: Operates as both a fraternity and a sorority under the same name and constitution.)
Lambda Phi Lambda	1990	United States	Professional, community-based	Independent	Inactive ?	
Phi Alpha Psi	February 6, 1991	Virginia Commonwealth University	Social, collegiate	Independent	Inactive	(Note: The sorority had four chapters, including Alpha - VCU (1992), Beta - Morgan State University (1994), Gamma - Coppin State College (1994), and Epsilon - University of the Virginia Islands.)
Psi Delta Chi	October 2, 1994	University of Wisconsin–Milwaukee	Social, collegiate	Independent	Active	(Note: Not affiliated with the Psi Delta Chi military sorority.)
Gamma Pi Alpha	November 12, 1994	Tuskegee University	Service, collegiate	Independent	Active	
Delta Psi Epsilon	January 16, 1999	Oakwood University	Christian, collegiate	Independent	Active	
Sigma Phi Psi	February 2000	United States	Professional, community-based	Independent	Active	
Zeta Phi Zeta	April 11, 2001	Chicago, Illinois	Christian, community-based	X-STREAM Ministries	Active	
Alpha Theta Omega	March 11, 2002	Tennessee State University	Christian, collegiate	Independent	Active	
Zeta Iota Chi	2003	United States	Christian, community-based	Independent	Inactive	
Delta Rho	July 1, 2004	Orlando, Florida	Service, community-based	Independent	Active	(Note: Members must be at least 25 years old. Most members are professional women.)
Kappa Psi Psi	2006	Florida A&M University	Professional, collegiate	Independent	Active	
Alpha Eta Theta	September 13, 2007	Mitchellville, Maryland	Christian, community-based	Independent	Active	
Chi Nu Alpha	June 3, 2007	United States	Christian, community-based	Association of Fraternal Christian Organizations and Ministries	Active	
Delta Phi Psi	June 10, 2008	United States	Christian, community-based	Association of Fraternal Christian Organizations and Ministries	Inactive	
Theta Phi Sigma	2009	United States	Christian, community-based	Anointed Assembly of Christian Fraternities and Sororities	Active	
Kappa Theta Epsilon	February 24, 2009	Houston, Texas	LGBTQ professional, community-based	Independent	Active	
Sigma Theta Lambda	November 25, 2009	Greensboro, North Carolina	Literary, community-based	Independent	Active	
Daughters of Christ Soarority	2010	United States	Christian, community-based	Independent	Inactive	
Sigma Omega Mu	2010	United States	Christian, community-based	Independent	Inactive	
Alpha Pi Delta	June 28, 2010	Dallas, Texas	Service, lesbians, community-based	Independent	Active	
Kappa Epsilon Psi	April 4, 2011	Pembroke Pines, Florida	Professional, community-based	PFA	Active	
Alpha Alpha Gamma Psi	April 20, 2011	Chester, South Carolina	Christian, community-based	Independent	Active	
Nu Alpha Omicron	2012	Alabama State University	Service, collegiate	Independent	Active	
Zeta Nu Delta	August 6, 2013	South Carolina	Christian, community-based	Independent	Active	
Alpha Gamma Xi	January 1, 2014	Covington, Tennessee	Professional, community-based	Independent	Active	
Eta Alpha	2015	United States	Christian	Independent	Inactive ?	
Alpha Omega Chi	October 25, 2015	Cincinnati Christian University	Christian, community-based	Independent	Active	
Mu Alpha Mu	2016	United States	Christian, community-based	Independent	Active	
Delta Omicron Alpha	May 15, 2016	Ellenwood, Georgia	Professional, community-based	Independent	Active	
Rho Upsilon Tau	June 11, 2016	United States	Professional, community-based	Independent	Active	
Gamma Pi Chi	July 16, 2016	Georgia	Professional service, community-based	Independent	Active	(Note: Members must be enrolled in college, have a college degree, or professional certification in her chosen career and live in Georgia, Alabama, Florida, Tennessee, Mississippi, Louisiana, North Carolina or South Carolina)
Alpha Psi Alpha	2017	United States	Christian, community-based	Independent	Active	
Iota Gamma Psi	2017	Fayetteville, North Carolilna	Professional, community-based	Independent	Active	
Lambda Beta Alpha	2017	Manassas, Virginia	Professional, community-based	Military Women's Coalition	Active	
Mu Phi Psi	June 17, 2017	United States	Professional, community-based	United Federation of Military Greek Organizations	Active	
Sigma Tau Sigma	March 7, 2017	Lithonia, Georgia	Christian, community-based	Independent	Active	
Alpha Omega Phi	March 10, 2017	West Philadelphia, Pennsylvania	Professional, community-based	United Federation of Military Greek Organizations	Active	
Alpha Lambda Psi Military Spouses Sorority	June 29, 2017	Columbia, South Carolina	Social, community-based	United Federation of Military Greek Organizations	Active	
Tau Rho Mu	October 19, 2017	Montgomery, Alabama	Christian, community-based	Independent	Active	
Kappa Gamma Sigma	January 1, 2018	Chicago, Illinois	Christian, community-based	Independent	Active	
Lambda Psi Alpha	February 17, 2018	Columbia, South Carolina	Christian, community-based	Independent	Active	
Tau Beta Gamma	August 8, 2018	Lithonia, Georgia	Christian, community-based	Independent	Active	
Nu Gamma Rho Military Wives Sorority	January 18, 2019	United States	Social, community-based	Independent	Active	
Zeta Sigma Psi	June 7, 2019	Hampton, Virginia	Professional, community-based	Independent	Active	
Delta Iota Delta	October 10, 2019	Gainesville, Florida	Christian, community-based	Independent	Active	
Psi Delta Chi MSI	November 8, 2019	Jacksonville, Florida	Professional, community-based	Independent	Active	
Lambda Chi Omega	2020	Huntsville, Alabama	Christian, community-based	Independent	Active	
Pi Mu Phi	2020	United States	Professional, community-based	Independent	Active	
Phi Nu Alpha Military Spouses Sorority	August 3, 2020	United States	Social, community-based	Independent	Active	
Xi Gamma Phi	2021	Kansas City, Missouri	Professional	Independent	Active	
Iota Sigma Chi	February 2, 2021	McDonough, Georgia	Christian, community-based	Independent	Active	
Gamma Theta Xi	2024	Texas	Service, collegiate	National African American Greek Letter Association	Active	
Delta Omega Delta		Atlanta, Georgia	Christian	Independent	Active	

== See also ==
- Afro-Latino sororites and fraternites
- Cultural interest fraternities and sororities
- National Pan-Hellenic Council
- Racism in Greek life
- Service fraternities and sororities
