= Kappa Alpha Psi =

International historically Black fraternity

Coordinates: 39.98856°N 75.15611°W

- ΚΑΨ
- Founded: January 5, 1911; 115 years ago Indiana University Bloomington
- Type: Social
- Affiliation: NPHC; NIC
- Status: Active
- Emphasis: African Americans
- Scope: International
- Motto: "Achievement in Every Field of Human Endeavor"
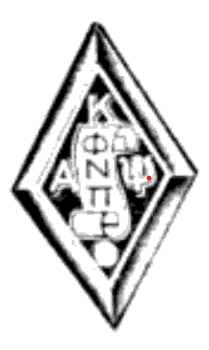
- Member badge
- Colors: Crimson and Cream
- Symbol: Kappa Kane (walking stick)
- Flower: Red carnation
- Publication: The Kappa Alpha Psi Journal
- Chapters: 721
- Members: 260,000+ active
- Nicknames: Kappas, Nupes
- Former name: Kappa Alpha Nu
- Headquarters: 2322-24 North Broad Street; Philadelphia, Pennsylvania; United States
- Website: www.kappaalphapsi1911.com

Kappa Alpha Psi Fraternity, Inc. (ΚΑΨ) is a historically African American fraternity. Since the fraternity's founding on January 5, 1911, at Indiana University Bloomington, it has never restricted membership based on color, creed, or national origin, though membership traditionally is dominated by black men. The fraternity has over 260,000 members with 721 undergraduate and alumni chapters in every state of the United States, and international chapters in ten countries.

Kappa Alpha Psi sponsors programs providing community service, social welfare, and academic scholarship through the Kappa Alpha Psi Foundation. It is a supporter of the United Negro College Fund and Habitat for Humanity. Kappa Alpha Psi is a member of the National Pan-Hellenic Council (NPHC) and the North American Interfraternity Conference (NIC). The fraternity is the oldest predominantly African American Greek-letter organization founded west of the Appalachian Mountains still in existence. It is known for its "cane stepping" in NPHC-organized step shows.

== History ==
The fraternity was founded as Kappa Alpha Nu on the night of January 5, 1911, by ten African-American college students. The founders of the fraternity were Ezra D. Alexander, Byron Kenneth Armstrong, Henry Tourner Asher, Marcus Peter Blakemore, Paul Waymond Caine, Elder Watson Diggs, George Wesley Edmonds, Guy Levis Grant, Edward Giles Irvin, and John Milton Lee.

In addition to the founders, Frederick Mitchell's name is on the application for the incorporation of the fraternity, but he withdrew from school and never became a member of the fraternity. The founders endeavored to establish the fraternity with a strong foundation before embarking on plans of expansion. By the end of the first year, the ritual was completed, and a design for the coat of arms and motto had begun.

The name Kappa Alpha Nu may have been chosen to honor the Alpha Kappa Nu club, which began in 1903 on the Indiana University campus but had too few registrants to effect continued operation. The organization known today as Kappa Alpha Psi Fraternity, Inc. was nationally incorporated under the name of Kappa Alpha Nu on May 15, 1911. The name of the organization was changed to its current name in 1915, shortly after its creation. The fraternity is unique among NPHC-affiliated organizations in that it has two names: Kappa Alpha Psi (ΚΑΨ) and Kappa Alpha Nu.

During this time, there were very few African-American students at the majority-white campus at Bloomington, Indiana, and they were a small minority due to the era of the Jim Crow laws. Many African-American students rarely saw each other on campus and were discouraged or prohibited from attending student functions and extracurricular activities by white college administrators and fellow students. African-American students were denied membership in athletic teams except for track and field. The racial prejudice and discrimination encountered by the founders strengthened their bond of friendship and growing interest in starting a social group.

By 1913, the fraternity expanded with the second undergraduate chapter opened at the University of Illinois—Beta chapter; then the University of Iowa—Gamma chapter. In 1915, Kappa Alpha Psi chartered undergraduate chapters on Black college campuses at Wilberforce University—Delta chapter, and Lincoln University (Pennsylvania)—Epsilon chapter. In 1920, Xi chapter was chartered at Howard University. In 1921, the fraternity installed the Omicron chapter at Columbia University, its first at an Ivy League university. The fraternity's first chapter in the South was established in 1921 at Morehouse College – Pi chapter. The first chapter in the West was established in 1923 at University of California, Los Angeles – Upsilon chapter. Kappa Alpha Psi expanded through the Midwest, South, and West at both white and black colleges.

Some believe the Greek letters Kappa Alpha Nu were chosen as a tribute to Alpha Kappa Nu, but the name became an ethnic slur among racist factions. Founder Elder Watson Diggs, while observing a young initiate compete in a track meet, overheard fans referring to the member as a "kappa alpha nig", and a campaign to rename the fraternity ensued. The resolution to rename the group was adopted in December 1914, and the fraternity states, "the name acquired a distinctive Greek letter symbol and KAPPA ALPHA PSI thereby became a Greek letter Fraternity in every sense of the designation." Kappa Alpha Psi has been the official name since April 15, 1915.

In 1947, at the Los Angeles Conclave, the National Silhouettes of Kappa Alpha Psi were established as an auxiliary group, whose membership comprises wives or widows of fraternity members. In 1980, the Silhouettes were officially recognized and granted a seat on the board of directors of the Kappa Alpha Psi Foundation. Silhouettes provide support and assistance for the activities of Kappa Alpha Psi at the Grand chapter, province, and local levels.

Kappa Alpha Psi is a member of the National Pan-Hellenic Council (NPHC) and the North American Interfraternity Conference (NIC). It has over 150,000 members and is divided into twelve provinces (districts/regions), with each chapter under the aegis of a province.

== Symbols and traditions ==
The original name (Kappa Alpha Nu) is the source of the nickname for members, "Nupes". The phrase Phi Nu Pi (ΦΝΠ) has a deeper meaning only known to its membership.

The fraternity's badge is diamond-shaped and features a raised black scroll with the Greek letters ΚΑΨ. The fraternity's colors are crimson and cream. Its flower is the red carnation. Its motto is "Achievement in Every Field of Human Endeavor".

The Kappa Alpha Psi Journal has been the official magazine of the fraternity since 1914. The Journal is published four times a year in February, April, October, and December. Frank M. Summers was the magazine's first editor and later became the fourteenth grand polemarch.

=== Kappa "Kane" ===
In the 1950s, as black Greek-letter organizations began the tradition of step shows, the fraternity began using the "Kappa Kane" in what it termed "cane stepping". The kappa canes were longer in the 1950s than in later decades. In the early 1960s, the cane was decorated with the fraternity colors. In the 1970s, the cane was shortened so brothers could "twirl" and tap the cane in the choreography with high dexterity. The process of covering the cane in the fraternal colors is considered "wrapping".

In the 1960s, the national organization did not condone the use of canes or Kappa Alpha Psi's participation in step shows, contending that "the hours spent in step practices by chapters each week would be better devoted to academic or civic achievement." Senior Grand Vice Polemarch Ulysses McBride complained about the vulgar language and obscene gestures sometimes engaged in by cane-stepping participants during these stepshows. In 1986, during the fraternity's 66th national meeting, cane stepping was finally recognized as an important staple of Kappa Alpha Psi.

== Activities ==
=== Guide Right ===
Guide Right is a program for the educational and occupational guidance of youth, primarily inspirational and informational. Its reach extends to high schools and colleges alike. In the latter, giving due attention to the needs of undergraduate Brothers. Conceived in 1922 by Leon Walker Steward and suggested at the twelfth Grand chapter of Kappa Alpha Psi, Guide Right became the fraternity's national service program.

The five national Guide Right initiatives are Kappa League Jr. Kappa League, A-MAN Program, St. Jude Research Hospital, and the premier program, "Kappa Kamp," which enables inner city boys to attend camps across the county.

=== Kappa League ===
The Kappa League was founded on February 12, 1970, by the Los Angeles (CA) Alumni chapter of Kappa Alpha Psi; under the direction of Leon W Steward. Steward brought the idea to Los Angeles from Dayton, Ohio, where he had worked closely with Jay Crosby to expand the Guide Right activities of Dayton (OH) Alumni chapter. The Kappa League is a series of activities designed to help young high school male students develop their leadership talents. The activities provide both challenging and rewarding experiences to enhance their lives. The goal of the league is to help the students achieve worthy goals for themselves and to make meaningful contributions to their communities. It includes a series of workshops to achieve its goals. Students from grades 6 to 12th can join .

=== Student of the Year ===
The Student of the Year competition is a contest that encompasses six areas deemed critical to a successful life: scholarship, talent, community involvement, poise and appearance, career preparation, and model chapter operation. Each province sponsors a pageant during its council. In the year of a Grand Chapter Meeting, the province winners compete at the Grand Chapter Meeting. The first Student of the Year Pageant was held on May 20, 1972, at Drexel University, under the direction of Mel Davis. The first Pageant at the Grand Chapter Meeting occurred at the 58th Grand Chapter Meeting.

=== Kappa Alpha Psi Foundation ===
The Kappa Alpha Psi Foundation, established in 1981, is the philanthropic arm of the fraternity and assists both alumni and undergraduate chapters in support of scholarships, after-school programs, and national projects such as Habitat for Humanity.

The Kappa Alpha Psi Foundation was conceived by Oliver S. Gumbs, the 23rd Grand Polemarch. In May 1982, he proposed forming a separate 501(c)(3) charitable foundation to accept contributions to finance the headquarters' renovation project. The foundation also accepts contributions from individuals, organizations, and businesses.

== Membership ==
Kappa Alpha Psi accepts male students of any color, creed, or national origin. To be considered for membership, a candidate must have at least a 2.5 GPA. For consideration into Kappa Alpha Psi on the alumni level, a candidate must possess a bachelor's degree or the equivalent from an accredited college or university. Kappa Alpha Psi no longer bestows honorary membership.

== Governance ==
The president of the national fraternity is known as the Grand Polemarch, who assigns a Province Polemarch for each of the twelve provinces (regions) of the nation.

=== Provinces ===
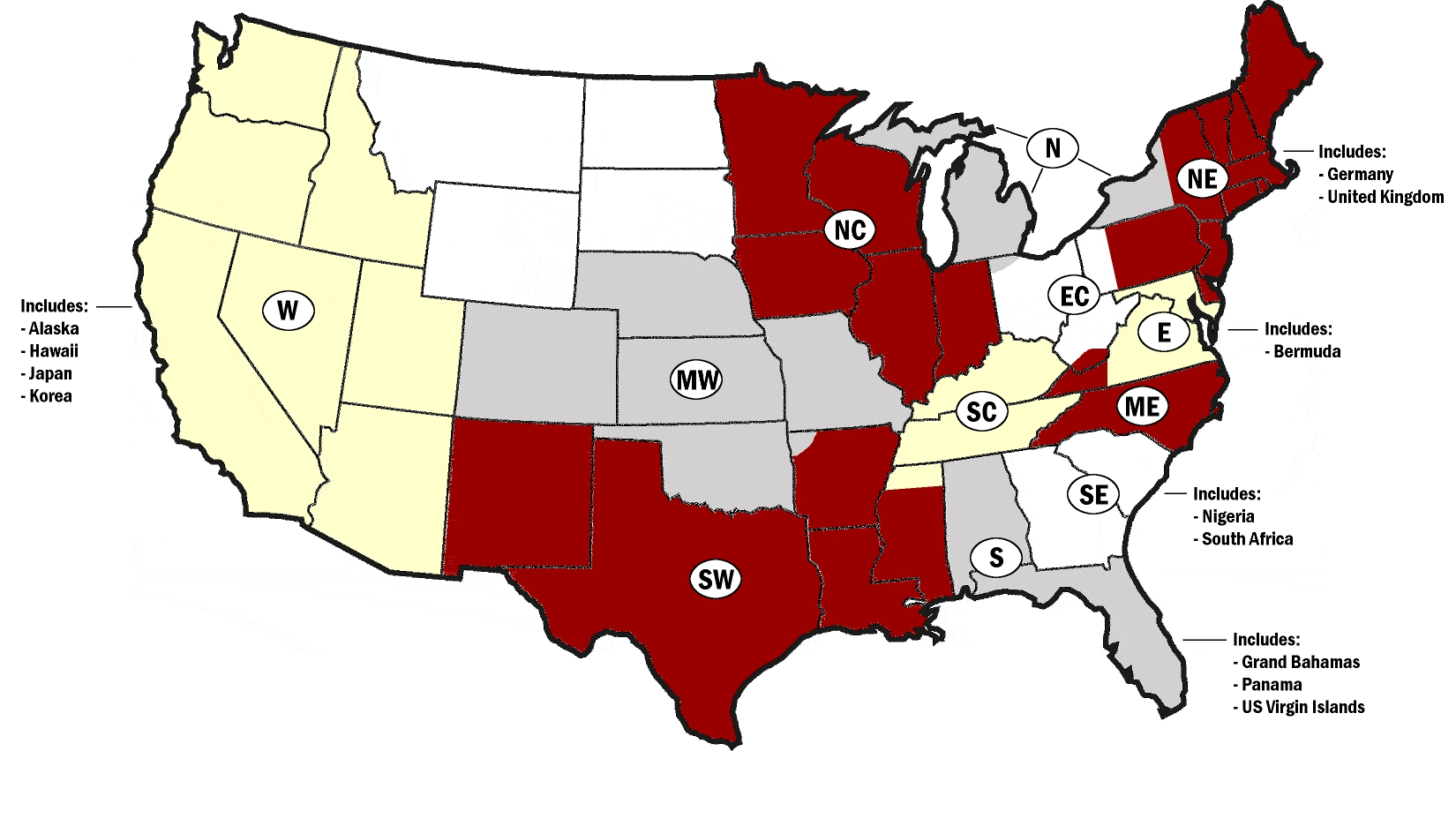
Map of the twelve provinces of Kappa Alpha Psi.

In 1921, the Fraternity was divided into districts as a result of proposed legislation by George F. David II, the third Grand Polemarch. The idea originated with David's father, who was a presiding elder of the A.M.E. Church. David II implemented the division of the fraternity into three districts. Past Grand Polemarch Irven Armstrong was assigned the first; Harrison R. Duke, the second; and Harold M. Tyler, the third district. The three districts grew into four regions.

Fifth Grand Polemarch Earl B. Dickerson changed the designation of "Region" to "Province" and "Regional Director" to "Province Polemarch" at the 15th Grand Chapter Meeting in 1925. During the original establishment of provinces, the following provinces were established: Eastern, Middle Eastern, Central, Great Lakes, Northwestern, Western, Southern, and Southeastern Provinces. Currently there are twelve provinces with the following names:

- Northern (States Covered: Northwest OH, MI, Western NY)
- Eastern (States Covered: DC, MD, VA, Bermuda)
- Southern (States Covered: AL, FL, The Bahamas, Republic of Panama, U.S. Virgin Islands)
- Western (States Covered: AZ, CA, NV, AK, OR, WA, ID, UT, HI, Japan, South Korea)
- North Eastern (States Covered: DE, CT, MA, NJ, Eastern PA, RI, Eastern NY, ME, NH, VT, Germany, United Kingdom)
- South Eastern (States Covered: GA, SC, South Africa, Nigeria)
- South Western (States Covered: AR, LA, Southern MS, NM, TX)
- North Central (States Covered: IA, IL, IN, WI, MN)
- East Central (States Covered: OH, Western PA, Northern WV)
- South Central (States Covered: KY, TN, Northern MS)
- Middle Eastern (States Covered: NC, Southern WV)
- Middle Western (States Covered: CO, KS, MO, NE, OK)

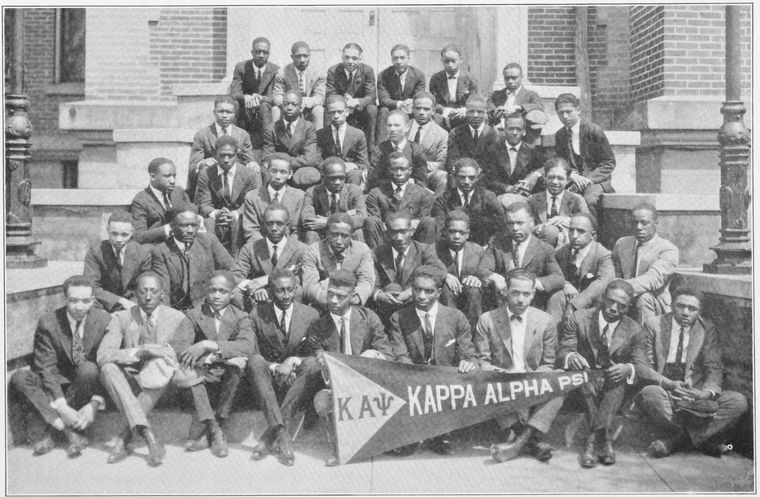
Kappa Alpha Psi chapter at Wilberforce, 1922

== Chapters ==
Kappa Alpha Psi has chartered over 721 undergraduate and alumni chapters in every state of the United States, and international chapters in the United Kingdom, Canada, Germany, South Korea, Japan, United States Virgin Islands, Nigeria, South Africa, the Dominican Republic, and The Bahamas.

== Member misconduct ==
=== Branding ===
Historically, members opted-in to have the fraternity's Greek letters branded on their arms or chest after initiation into the fraternity. Kappa Alpha Psi members called the branding process "getting hit", and those who do not get branded were called "naked brothers". Some members received three brands—one on the chest over the heart and one on each arm—while others received just one brand. Members were branded with either coat hangers or a branding iron.

=== Embezzlement ===
In February 2022, fraternity member and head financial director of the fraternity, Curtis Anderson, was sentenced to 2.5 years in prison for embezzling $3 million from the fraternity over six years. Other fraternity leaders were alerted by Santander Bank of many suspicious transactions, which led to his firing and arrest. Anderson admitted to gambling and alcohol addictions. Prosecutors confirmed he spent most of the money at Harrah's Philadelphia Casino & Racetrack.

=== Hazing ===
The fraternity's stated position is that hazing and pledging are forbidden and that violators of this policy are to be expelled. In 1990, Kappa Alpha Psi along with fellow NPHC organizations issued a joint statement announcing the elimination of pledging. The fraternity backed its stance by releasing Executive Order One in 1988, Executive Order Two in 1993, and Executive Order Three in 1994. Many members of Kappa Alpha Psi have nonetheless conducted underground pledging and have engaged in acts of hazing, and as a result, the fraternity has had many complaints of hazing lodged against it, most related to the pledging process.

In 1994, Michael Davis, a Southeast Missouri State University student, was beaten to death participating in a pledging ritual by members of Kappa Alpha Psi. After a pledging ritual, fraternity members placed his lifeless body in his bed, where he was officially pronounced dead. His family won a $1.4 million wrongful death lawsuit against the fraternity, and several Kappas served time in prison.

Also in 1994, Steven Otley Jr., a Kappa Alpha Psi pledge from Southern College of Technology, was hospitalized after he was beat repeatedly and fraternity members stood on his abdomen. Christopher Allen Powell, a pledge at the University of Georgia, was hospitalized in 1994 after his wounds from repeated paddling became infected.

In February 1996, a University of Pittsburgh pledge for Kappa Alpha Psi named Santana Kenner-Henderson was beaten severely and was in critical condition for more than a week; he was 20 at the time. Another student was beaten along with him. Five members of the fraternity were arrested as a result.

Donald Edwards was pledging to be a part of Kappa Alpha Psi Fraternity Inc., and experienced hazing, which included a bruised kidney, a concussion, and cigarette burns, in addition to getting extorted for his money. As a result, the fraternity was suspended from NIU's campus, they no longer had a Kappa house, and five of the attackers were suspended, and two were expelled.

In 1998, eleven Kappas affiliated with the University of Maryland Eastern Shore were charged with first-degree assault and reckless endangerment for hospitalizing several pledges. One pledge was beaten so badly that many of the veins in his backside were broken and he developed a life-threatening gangrene infection.

In 2006, the chapter at Florida A&M University was suspended after two members were sentenced to serve two years in prison and three others given three years of probation due to an anti-hazing law established in Florida following a hazing death involving the Kappa Sigma fraternity at the University of Miami in 2001. According to sworn complaints made by pledges at FAMU, they were punched, hit with canes, and hit with two-by-fours, and suffered extreme exhaustion due to hazing. One pledge was admitted to a hospital for two days after a brutal night of hazing left him with a ruptured eardrum and half a pint of lost blood.

In 2009, Louisiana State University (LSU) placed an eleven-year ban on the fraternity for repeated hazing violations and severe abuse of pledges. LSU will not consider reinstatement of the fraternity until at least 2020. Also in 2009, two Kappas at the University of North Texas were arrested and charged with a Class B misdemeanor for beating a pledge with a paddle. In 2009, a former pledge at the University of Tennessee at Chattanooga sued the fraternity for $1 million to cover medical bills caused by an encounter with violent fraternity members.

In 2010, a pre-med student at Wayne State University suffered kidney failure and was hospitalized for twelve days after weeks of physical abuse by men of the fraternity. Also in 2010, the fraternity chapter was permanently banned from the campus of Georgia State University for being a repeat offender and beating a pledge so badly that he coughed up blood. In 2011, the fraternity registration was canceled at the University of Texas at San Antonio for striking pledges and providing misleading information to university officials during the hazing investigation.

In March 2012, the University of Florida chapter of Kappa Alpha Psi was suspended because of thirteen misdemeanor-level sworn complaints involving striking and harassing pledges. In April 2012, the fraternity at Arkansas Tech University was permanently banned from campus for beating a pledge into a coma. The fraternity was suspended at Kent State University for hazing in October 2013. In 2013, a former pledge at California State University-Bakersfield sued the fraternity after being shot with a BB gun and hit with canes and horse whips that left him paralyzed. Also in 2013, nine Kappas were charged with felony assault for severely beating pledges from Youngstown State University in 2012.

In 2014, eleven Kappas from the University of Georgia were arrested and charged with hazing for severely beating and humiliating pledges. In March 2014, several Kappas from the University of Memphis were arrested and charged for hazing and beating pledges. Also in March 2014, five Kappas from the University of Central Arkansas were arrested for beating pledges.

In 2015, a D.C. man sued the fraternity for hazing and humiliation. The 45-year-old filed a $2 million lawsuit because he stated that after paying his non-refundable $3,000 graduate intake membership fee, he was coerced into allowing himself to be beaten with a cane, rub lotion on a Kappa, and clean a Kappa's house in only his underwear and bare feet to become a welcomed member of the fraternity. Also in 2015, a former pledge at Coppin State University sued the fraternity for $4 million due to injuries he sustained while pledging. In his lawsuit, he stated he was beaten and terrorized by CSU Kappa alumni members in their thirties and forties.

In 2016, three unidentified men affiliated with the fraternity at the University of Central Florida (UCF) were brutally beaten by Kappas after dropping their twirling canes while dancing, according to witnesses. The UCF chapter was placed on suspension and under investigation. Also in 2016, the chapter at Florida State University (FSU) was suspended by the university after a concerned mother of a pledge shared with a Tallahassee news station a disturbing video showing pledges being brutally beaten with canes by Kappas. FSU also placed the chapter under investigation to identify and prosecute all members involved in the beatings.

In 2018, it was reported that the chapter at Edward Waters College was beating and paddling pledges as well as forcing them to take a designer drug called "jig," a mixture of synthetic heroin, cocaine, and LSD.

In March 2019, Delaware State University student Marlon W. Jackson died, and three other students were hospitalized after a car crash due to sleep deprivation caused by pledging the fraternity. As a result, the Delaware State University chapter was suspended for ten years. In April 2019, three Virginia State University members were arrested and charged with ten counts of hazing. Eight other fraternity members received University discipline but no criminal charges related to a hazing incident.

In 2026, three men, including a U.S. Secret Service agent, were arrested and each charged with hazing, attempted manslaughter, and aggravated battery with a deadly weapon for allegedly "paddling a new fraternity member so severely that the student suffered kidney damage and nearly died," according to the New York Times. The newspaper reported that a warrant stated that a second victim had similar injuries and had to be "intubated during an emergency hospital stay."

== See also ==
- College fraternities and sororities
- List of social fraternities and sororities
- List of African-American Greek and fraternal organizations
