= Phi Delta Psi =

American social collegiate fraternity

- ΦΔΨ
- Founded: March 21, 1977; 48 years ago Western Michigan University
- Type: Social
- Affiliation: Independent
- Status: Active
- Emphasis: African American
- Scope: National
- Motto: "All that we put into the lives of others comes back into our own"
- Pillars: Eternal Honor, Perseverance, Leadership, Achievement, and Brotherhood.
- Colors: Cardinal Red and Aztec Gold
- Symbol: Blazing Torch
- Flower: Red rose
- Publication: The Lion's Den
- Chapters: 21
- Nicknames: Deuces, Flamethrowers, Phi-Men
- Headquarters: P.O. Box 3088; Southfield, Michigan 48037; United States
- Website: www.phideltapsifraternity.org

Phi Delta Psi Fraternity, Inc. (ΦΔΨ) is a social fraternity. It was founded as an African American fraternity in 1977 on the campus of Western Michigan University.

== History ==
Phi Delta Psi was founded as an African American fraternity on the predominately white campus of Western Michigan University on March 27, 1977. Its Founding Fathers include Kwameh Barnett, Derek Bell, Richard Bell, Gregory Brown, Charles Cameron, Gerald Dixon, Denis Jones, Peter McClain, Michael Mosby, and Daulton Tansil.

Its founding fathers wanted to create a fraternity that would meet the social, economic, and political challenges of African American men. The fraternity continues to honor its founders' mantra of community service for the benefit of its universities, families, communities, and the world.

One of the fraternity's first initiatives was its Sickle Cell Testing Initiative, followed by Great American Smokeout. The group's current project is Stopping Aids by Forever Educating or the S.A.F.E Initiative.

== Symbols ==
Phi Delta Psi motto is "All that we put into the lives of others comes back into our own". It was founded on the pillars of eternal honor, perseverance, leadership, achievement, and brotherhood. Its colors are cardinal red and Aztec gold. Its symbol is the blazing torch. Its flower is the red rose.

Its publication is The Lion's Den.

== Chapters ==
Following are the Phi Delta Psi chapters. Active chapters are indicated in bold. Inactive chapters are shown in italics. Note that the Phi Delta Psi local fraternity established in 1966 at Southern New Hampshire University has never been affiliated with this organization.

Chapters	Charter and range	Institution	Location	Status	Reference
**Alpha**	1977	Western Michigan University	Kalamazoo, Michigan	Active	
**Beta**	1981	University of Detroit Mercy	Detroit, Michigan	Active	(Note: The University of Detroit and Mercy College merged in 1990. Beta chapter had formed at the University of Detroit about a decade prior to the merger.)
**Gamma**	1981	Ferris State University	Big Rapids, Michigan	Active	
**Delta**	1982	Wayne State University	Detroit, Michigan	Active	
**Epsilon**	1982	Central Michigan University	Mount Pleasant, Michigan	Active	
**Zeta**	1995	Grand Valley State University	Allendale, Michigan	Active	
**Eta**	1998	Saint John’s University	New York City, New York	Active	
**Theta**	1999	Michigan State University	East Lansing, Michigan	Active	(Note: Formed as a colony in 1998.)
**Iota**	1999	Saint John’s University	Queens, New York City, New York	Active	
**Kappa**	2000	Norfolk State University	Norfolk, Virginia	Active	
**Lambda**	2002	Hampton University	Hampton, Virginia	Active	
**Mu**	2003	Drexel University	Philadelphia, Pennsylvania	Active	
**Nu**	2003	Eastern Michigan University	Ypsilanti, Michigan	Active	
**XI**	2004	Alabama A&M University	Normal, Alabama	Active	
**Omicron**	2004	Saint Augustine's University	Raleigh, North Carolina	Active	
**Pi**	2004	Temple University	Philadelphia, Pennsylvania	Active	
**Rho**	2004	Pennsylvania State University	University Park, Pennsylvania	Active	
**Sigma**	2004	Savannah State University	Savannah, Georgia	Active	
**Tau**	2005	Kentucky State University	Frankfort, Kentucky	Active	
**Upsilon**	2005	Columbia College Chicago	Chicago, Illinois	Active	
Phi	2005–2010	University of Illinois Urbana-Champaign	Urbana and Champaign, Illinois	Inactive	
**Chi**	2008	Cleveland State University	Cleveland, Ohio	Active	

== See also ==
- List of African-American fraternities
- List of social fraternities and sororities
