= Phi Eta Psi =

African American collegiate fraternity

- ΦΗΨ
- Founded: April 5, 1965; 60 years ago Mott Community College
- Type: Social
- Affiliation: NIC
- Status: Active
- Emphasis: African American
- Scope: National
- Colors: Green and Gold
- Chapters: 36 inactive collegiate 17 active alumni
- Members: 7,000 lifetime
- Nickname: IMPS
- Headquarters: 250 Boulevard Drive, Suite 733; Flint, Michigan 48503; United States
- Website: phietapsi1965.com

Phi Eta Psi (ΦΗΨ) is an African American collegiate fraternity. It was established on April 5, 1965, at Mott Community College in Flint, Michigan. The fraternity chartered 36 collegiate chapters which are now all inactive. Its alumni association and local alumni chapters remain active. The fraternity is a member of the North American Interfraternity Conference.

== History ==
Phi Eta Psi is an African American social fraternity that was established on April 5, 1965, at Mott Community College in Flint, Michigan. Its founders were Willie Buck, Jerome Davis (Jihad Hassan Sharif), Rondy Harris, James Humphrey, Leon Lucas, Lincoln Murphy, Ronald Thompson, and Eugene Tolbert.

A second chapter, Gamma, was formed at GMI Engineering and Management Institute (now Kettering University) in 1968. Beta, formed at the University of Michigan–Flint in 1971. The first chapter established outside Flint was at Eastern Michigan University in 1971; this chapter was active until 2010.

The fraternity has been active in voter registration drives, participated in the Poor People's March on Washington, and raised funds for Big Brothers and Sickle-Cell Anemia. It has sponsored seminars and discussions on political and social issues. The fraternity also sponsors annual scholarships, mentoring programs, and entrepreneurial training.

The fraternity applied for membership in the National Pan-Hellenic Council in 1971 but was turned down; at the time the fraternity just had four chapters and 150 members. Later, Phi Eta Psi became a member of the North American Interfraternity Conference. It was a national fraternity with fifteen chapters in five states by 1975. By 1984, it had 36 chapters and nearly 7,000 members.

All collegiate chapters are now dormant, although its alumni remain active at the national level. Its headquarters are located at 250 Boulevard Drive in Flint, Michigan.

== Symbols ==
The Greek letters Phi Eta Psi were selected to represent the Greek words "Philosophy of the Soul Psychology". The colors of Phi Eta Psi are green and gold. Its member's nickname is Emeralds.

== Chapters ==
=== Collegiate chapters ===
Following is an incomplete list of Pi Eta Psi collegiate chapters.

Chapter	Charter date and range	Institution	Location	Status	Ref.
Alpha	April 5, 1965	Mott Community College	Flint, Michigan	Inactive	
Beta	April 17, 1968	GMI Engineering and Management Institute (now Kettering University)	Flint, Michigan	Inactive	
Gamma	March 26, 1971	University of Michigan–Flint	Flint, Michigan	Inactive	
Delta	November 19, 1971 – 2010	Eastern Michigan University	Ypsilanti, Michigan	Inactive	
Epsilon	November 1972	Purdue University	West Lafayette, Indiana	Inactive	
Zeta	November 1972	University of Michigan	Ann Arbor, Michigan	Inactive	
Eta				Memorial	
	Fall 1975	Wright State University	Fairborn, Ohio	Inactive	
Theta	January 22, 1975	Eastern Washington University	Cheney, Washington	Inactive	
Iota	February 15, 1975	Indiana University Bloomington	Bloomington, Indiana	Inactive	
Kappa	Fall 1975	Alabama State University	Montgomery, Alabama	Inactive	
Lambda	19xx ?	Saginaw Valley State University	University Center, Michigan	Inactive	
Mu	19xx ?	Wayne State University	Detroit, Michigan	Inactive	
Nu	19xx ?	San Jose State University	San Jose, California	Inactive	
XI	19xx ?	University of California, Santa Barbara	Santa Barbara, California	Inactive	
Omicron	19xx ?	Ball State University	Muncie, Indiana	Inactive	
Pi	1998	Western Michigan University	Kalamazoo, Michigan	Inactive	
Rho	19xx ?	Ferris State University	Big Rapids, Michigan	Inactive	
Sigma	19xx ?	Wilberforce University	Wilberforce, Ohio	Inactive	
Tau	19xx ?	Kentucky State University	Frankfort, Kentucky	Inactive	
Upsilon	19xx ?	Grand Valley State University	Allendale, Michigan	Inactive	
Phi ?	19xx ?	University of Detroit Mercy	Detroit, Michigan	Inactive	
Chi	19xx ?	Michigan State University	East Lansing, Michigan	Inactive	
Psi ?	19xx ?	Washington State University Spokane	Spokane, Washington	Inactive	
Omega	19xx ?	Central Michigan University	Mount Pleasant, Michigan	Inactive	
Alpha Alpha	19xx ?	Indiana State University	Terre Haute, Indiana	Inactive	
Alpha Beta				Inactive	
Alpha Gamma	19xx ?	Northwood University	Midland, Michigan	Inactive	

=== Alumni chapters ===
Following is a list of Pi Eta Psi alumni chapters, with active chapters in bold and inactive chapters in italics.

Chapter	Greek letter name	Location	Status	Ref.
Flint Alumni Chapter	Phi Alpha Alpha	Flint, Michigan	Active	
Indiana Alumni Chapter	Phi Alpha Beta	Indianapolis, Indiana	Active	
Detroit Alumni Chapter	Phi Alpha Gamma	Detroit, Michigan	Active	
Metro West Alumni Chapter	Phi Alpha Delta	West Michigan	Active	
Houston Alumni Chapter	Phi Alpha Epsilon	Houston, Texas	Active	
Alabama Alumni Chapter	Phi Alpha Zeta	Birmingham, Alabama	Active	
Atlanta Alumni Chapter	Phi Alpha Eta	Atlanta, Georgia	Active	

== See also ==
- List of African-American fraternities and sororities
- List of social fraternities
