= Gamma Phi =

African American collegiate fraternity

- ΓΦ
- Founded: March 1, 1905; 121 years ago Wilberforce University
- Type: Social
- Affiliation: Independent
- Status: Defunct
- Defunct date: c. 1950
- Emphasis: African American
- Scope: National
- Colors: Blue and White
- Flower: White carnation
- Chapters: 4
- Headquarters: Wilberforce, Ohio; United States

Gamma Phi (ΓΦ) was an African American fraternity founded on March 1, 1905 at Wilberforce University. It went defunct sometime before 1950. Gamma Phi is notable as being one of the forerunners in the African American collegiate fraternal scene.

== History ==
Edward Clark, D. R, Lackley, and Gus Williams formed Gamma Phi at the historically black college Wilberforce University in Wilberforce, Ohio on March 1, 1905. It was the second or third African American collegiate fraternity in the United States and was the first to survive for more than a short time. Gamma Phi group was the sole fraternity on campus until 1912.

After operating as a local fraternity, the Gamma Phi grew into a national fraternity with at least three additional chapters, Gamma Phi existed at Wilberforce University on and off for many years. The last known documentation of Gamma Phi is from 1947. Ashley F. G. Norwood notes "It isn’t clear exactly when or why it ceased to exist."

Gamma Phi is notable as being one of the forerunners in the African American Collegiate Fraternal scene.

== Symbols ==
The colors of Gamma Phi were blue and white. Its flower was the white carnation.

== Chapters ==
Following is a list of known Gamma Phi chapters.

Chapter	Charter date and range	Institution	Location	Status	Ref.
Alpha	March 1, 1905	Wilberforce University	Wilberforce, Ohio	Inactive	

== See also ==
- History of North American fraternities and sororities
- List of African-American Greek and fraternal organizations
