= Kappa Theta Epsilon =

American sorority for LGBTQ professional women

- ΚΘΕ
- Founded: February 24, 2009; 17 years ago Houston, Texas, US
- Type: Social
- Affiliation: Independent
- Status: Active
- Emphasis: Black LGBTQ
- Scope: National
- Motto: "Reach New Heights"
- Pillars: Sisterhood, Fidelity, Accomplishment, and Service
- Colors: Plum Rose and Sterling Silver
- Symbol: Swan and Butterfly
- Flower: Sterling rose
- Publication: Beacon; The Ladder
- Chapters: 5
- Colonies: 3
- Nickname: Kappa Theta, KTE
- Headquarters: Houston, Texas 77057; United States
- Website: www.kappathetaepsilon.com

Kappa Theta Epsilon Sorority (ΚΘΕ) is the first Greek-lettered social and service sorority for Black LGBTQ professional and entrepreneurial women. Membership is exclusive to lesbian women, and primarily college-educated. The sorority was founded on February 24, 2009, in Houston, Texas.

== History ==
=== Cultural context ===
The political climate of the early 21st century played a large role in the founding of Kappa Theta Epsilon. Negative media portrayal of lesbians and gays, and the emergence of same-sex marriage as a recurring political issue, inspired the sorority's founder to consider a sorority as a medium for creating change.

From the year 2000 to 2009, LGBT rights took a leading role in both politics and the justice system. Legally, the issue of marriage equality began to gain momentum, and laws criminalizing homosexuality were being overturned. Kappa Theta Epsilon's founders believed that a group of young leaders could advocate for more equitable policies in both the legislative and judicial arenas.

=== Sorority establishment ===
Kappa Theta Epsilon was founded on February 24, 2009, in Houston, Texas. It was the first social service sorority for professional and entrepreneurial lesbian women. Membership is by invitation and is exclusive to lesbian women, and primarily college-educated.

After researching existing organizations, it was decided that the group would adopt the letters Kappa Theta Epsilon (ΚΘΕ) to reflect its fundamental ideals. On February 25, the sorority's official colors and mascot were finalized.

Other symbols adopted in the early stages of the sorority were the founding tenets, flower, and jewel. It was agreed in September 2009 that, for the first two years, the development of infrastructure would take precedence over the initiation of new members.

=== Expansion ===
In February 2019, Kappa Theta Epsilon became a national organization with the founding of its second chapter, Beta, in Atlanta, Georgia. Its third chapter, Gamma, was established in Oakland, California in September 2022.

== Symbols ==
Kappa Theta Epsilon's motto is "Reach New Heights". The sorority's founding tenets or pillars are sisterhood, fidelity, accomplishment, and service. The sorority's publications are the quarterly Beacon and The Ladder, published semi-annually.

Kappa Theta Epsilon's colors are plum rose and sterling silver. Its flower is the sterling rose. Its symbols are the swan and butterfly.

== Philanthropy and programming ==
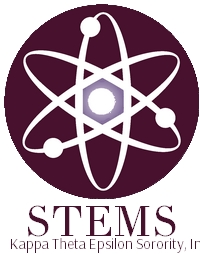
STEMS Program logo

=== Service philosophy ===
Kappa Theta Epsilon states that through its philosophy of "servant leadership", members have a direct impact on the conditions of their community and world. The sorority follows a five-target platform for philanthropy, designed to address problems affecting women globally, with emphasis on the health of lesbian women of African descent.

Every two years, Kappa Theta Epsilon selects a focus area and members devote the majority of their community service efforts to projects related to it. The sorority focuses its efforts on five philanthropic target areas:

Target Area	Program
Leadership Development	The Academy
Educational Advancement	Plum Goes Green Campaign
Holistic Health and Wellness	Life 360 Wellness Symposium
Economic Empowerment	Lesbians in Business Incubator
Social Impact and Policy Awareness	The For Eudy Project

== Chapters ==
Chapter	Charter date and range	City	Location	Status	Ref.
Alpha	February 24, 2009	Houston	Houston, Texas	Active	
Beta	February 2019	Atlanta	Atlanta, Georgia	Active	
Kappa Epsilon	April 2022		United States	Active	(Note: This is a nation-wide chapter.)
Gamma	September 2022	Oakland	Oakland, California	Active	
Flutters	January 2023		Florida, Illinois, Missouri, and Texas	Active	
Les Bons Temps		Lake Charles	Lake Charles, Louisiana	Colony	(Note: Colony was established in June 2016.)
SDC		San Diego	San Diego, California	Colony	(Note: Colony was established in September 2018.)
Heartland		Wichita	Wichita, Kansas	Colony	(Note: Colony was established in November 2018.)

== See also ==
- List of social fraternities and sororities
- List of LGBT and LGBT-friendly fraternities and sororities
