= Kappa Lambda Chi =

International professional military fraternity

- ΚΛΧ
- Founded: July 4, 2013; 13 years ago Clinton, North Carolina, U.S.
- Type: Professional and service
- Affiliation: PFA
- Status: Active
- Emphasis: Military
- Scope: International
- Motto: Imperium Sine Fine
- Colors: Purple and Black
- Symbol: Lock
- Flower: Purple Heart Viola
- Chapters: 33 (active)
- Colonies: 4
- Headquarters: 3951 Snapfinger Parkway Suite #350; Decatur, Georgia 30035; United States
- Website: militaryfraternity.com

Kappa Lambda Chi Military Fraternity Inc. (ΚΛΧ or KLC) is an international non-collegiate service and professional fraternity for men. It caters exclusively to the military members of all branches. Today, Kappa Lambda Chi has more than 20 chapters in the continental United States and abroad.

== History ==
Kappa Lambda Chi was founded on July 4, 2013, in Clinton, North Carolina, as an alternative to traditional Greek letter organizations for male service members. Its founding members were Sir Zachary D. S. Wyatt II (Air Force veteran), William C. Dickey (Army retired), and James K. Jackson (Army retired). Six additional brothers which the fraternity denotes as "Sentinels", and whom together are called the "Original Nine".

Kappa Lambda Chi was the first Greek-lettered fraternity established and incorporated by U.S. Armed Forces men.

== Symbols ==
Kappa Lambda Chi's motto is Imperium Sine Fine. Its colors are purple and black. Its symbol is a lock. Its flower is the purple heart viola.

== Membership ==
Fraternity members must currently serve or have previously served honorably in any branch of the United States Military.

== Activities ==
Through volunteer service, Kappa Lambda Chi members support veterans in need in and around their local communities. Members work with homeless shelters, abuse centers, children centers, and other organizations that provide hands-on support to organizations that do not receive support from external sources. Members also honor those who have served this nation by placing wreaths on the graves of veterans and service members in each branch of the military including Merchant Marines, prisoners of war and those named missing in action.

== Chapters ==
Following is a list of Kappa Lambda Chi chapters. Active chapters are indicated in bold. Inactive chapters are in italics.

Chapter	Charter date and range	Location	Status	Ref.
**Alpha**		Hampton Roads, Virginia	Active	
**Beta**		Northern Virginia	Active	
**Gamma**		Killeen, Texas	Active	
**Delta**		Fayetteville, North Carolina	Active	
**Epsilon**		Atlanta, Georgia	Active	
**Zeta**		El Paso, Texas	Active	
**Eta**		Columbia, South Carolina	Active	
**Theta**		Clarksville, Tennessee	Active	
**Iota**		Augusta, Georgia	Active	
**Kappa**		Memphis, Tennessee	Active	
**Lambda**		Little Rock, Arkansas	Active	
**Mu**		San Diego, California	Active	
**Nu**		Kansas City, Missouri	Active	
**Xi**		Jacksonville, Florida	Active	
**Omicron**		Laurel, Maryland	Active	
**Pi**		Honolulu, Hawaii	Active	
**Rho**		Columbus Georgia	Active	
**Sigma**		Savannah, Georgia	Active	
**Tau**		Fort Gregg-Adams	Active	
**Upsilon**		Tampa, Florida	Active	
**Phi**		Rota, Andalusia, Spain	Active	
**Chi**		Los Angeles, California	Active	
**Psi**		Cincinnati, Ohio	Active	
Omega			Unassigned	
**Alpha Alpha**		San Antonio, Texas	Active	
**Alpha Beta**		Valdosta, Georgia and Pensacola, Florida	Active	
**Alpha Gamma**		Warner Robins, Georgia	Active	
**Alpha Delta**		Birmingham, Alabama	Active	
Alpha Epsilon		St. Louis, MO	Active	
**Alpha Zeta**		Dallas, Texas	Active	
**Alpha Eta**		Colorado Springs, Colorado	Active	
**Alpha Theta**		Charlotte, North Carolina	Active	
**Alpha Iota**		Jackson, Mississippi	Active	
**Alpha Kappa**		Houston, Texas	Active	
**Alpha Lambda**		Joint Base Lewis–McChord, Washington	Active	
**Charleston Detachment**		Charleston, South Carolina	Active	
**Japan Detachment**		Japan	Active	
**Korea Detachment**		South Korea	Active	
New Orleans Detachment		New Orleans, Louisiana	Inactive	
**Oklahoma City Detachment**		Oklahoma City, Oklahoma	Active	
**Alpha Omicron**		Brooklyn, New York	Active	

== See also ==
- Kappa Epsilon Psi military sorority
