= Theta Pi Sigma =

American gender-neutral collegiate fraternity

- ΘΠΣ
- Founded: 2005; 21 years ago University of California, Santa Cruz
- Type: Social
- Affiliation: Independent
- Status: Active
- Emphasis: Queer life
- Scope: National
- Motto: θάνατος προτου συμμορφωση "Death Before Conformity"
- Pillars: Openness, Growth, and Respect
- Colors: Charcoal Gray, Snow White, and Sky Blue
- Symbol: Torch and Rainbow
- Flower: Red rose
- Chapters: 2 active
- Headquarters: Eugene, Oregon; United States

Theta Pi Sigma (ΘΠΣ) is an American queer-focused, gender-neutral fraternal organization. It was established in 2005 at the University of California, Santa Cruz and has expanded to six chapters across the United States. It is the first queer-focused, gender-neutral Greek organization.

== History ==
In 2005, Marc Garcia formed Delta Lambda Psi as a gender neutral and queer focused "frarority" at the University of California, Santa Cruz. Its purpose was "to strengthen Greek life at the University of California, Santa Cruz by providing a vehicle for positive leadership, change, and growth in the queer, transsexual, transgender, questioning, pansexual, lesbian, intersex, gender-queer, gay, bisexual, asexual and ally communities".

The second chapter was founded in 2012 at the Northeastern Illinois University, followed by a chapter at the University of Oregon later that year. Thus, it became world's first queer-focused, gender-neutral Greek organization.

In 2012, Delta Lambda Phi, an established gay fraternity, sued Delta Lambda Psi, saying that the name similarity and the identical initials, DLP, was a violation of its trademark. The lawsuit claimed that Garcia created Delta Lambda Psi after meeting members of Delta Lambda Phi at a conference at the University of California, Santa Cruz. At the time the lawsuit was filed Delta Lambda Psi was in the process of establishing a chapter at the University of Oregon which already had a chapter of Delta Lambda Phi; the lawsuit was filed in Oregon.

As a result of the lawsuit, Delta Lambda Phi changed its name to Theta Pi Sigma. In 2015, the Alpha chapter of Theta Pi Sigma voted to stop using the term "frarority" due to the connotations of the term.

== Symbols ==
Theta Pi Sigma's motto is θάνατος προτου συμμορφωση or "Death Before Conformity". The name Theta Pi Sigma is an acronym for its motto. Its values or pillars are Openness, Growth, and Respect. Its colors are charcoal gray, snow white, and sky blue.

Its badge is a blue shield with silver trim, divided into three sections. The top left section features three swords, recalling the three founding families, the upper rights consists of puzzle pieces that symbolize unity, and the bottom section includes a rainbow to represent all genders and sexualities. Above the shield is a torch that symbolizes knowledge. Below the shield is a banner with the Greek motto and the 2005 founding date. The shield is surrounded by red roses to represent growth and death.

== Activities ==
The organization's activities include hosting LGBTQ educational panels and a queer prom. The group also holds fundraisers to support scholarships for members and funding for its chapters.

== Chapters ==
In the following list, active chapters are indicated in bold and inactive chapters are in italics.

Chapter	Charter date and range	Institution	Location	Status	Ref.
Alpha	2005–c. 2023	University of California, Santa Cruz	Santa Cruz, California	Inactive	
Beta	2012–c. 2020	Northeastern Illinois University	Chicago, Illinois	Inactive	
**Gamma**	2012	University of Oregon	Eugene, Oregon	Active	
Delta				Unassigned	
Epsilon	2013–20xx ?	University of Maryland, College Park	College Park, Maryland	Inactive	
Zeta	2018–20xx ?	University of Colorado Boulder	Boulder, Colorado	Inactive	
**Eta**	2018	Case Western Reserve University	Cleveland, Ohio	Active	
