= Omicron Epsilon Pi =

American non-collegiate lesbian sorority

- ΟΕΠ
- Founded: February 7, 2000; 25 years ago Tallahassee, Florida
- Type: Social
- Affiliation: Independent
- Status: Active
- Emphasis: Feminine Lesbians of color, non-collegiate
- Scope: National
- Motto: "Not for ourselves, but for all in diversity'"
- Pillars: Achievement, Diversity, Leadership, Pride, Service, and Sisterly Love
- Colors: Royal Blue, Platinum, and Viridian
- Flower: White Camellia
- Jewel: Opal
- Mascot: Lioness
- Philanthropy: Project E.M.P.O.W.E.R.ment
- Chapters: 6 regions
- Headquarters: P.O. Box 55352; Atlanta, Georgia 30308; United States
- Website: www.oepi.com

Omicron Epsilon Pi (ΟΕΠ) is a non-collegiate American women's sorority with an emphasis on lesbians of color. Founded in 2000, it was the first Greek letter organization catering to the needs of lesbian women.

== History ==
Omicron Epsilon Pi has its origins in a group called Iota Lambda Pi, a sorority for Lesbian women of color that was formed on February 7, 2000. It was the first Greek letter organization catering to the needs of lesbian women. Its founders or Sapphires were Lakisha Goss, Michelle McCallum, Janiece Smith, and Stefany Richards. Eventually Iota Lambda Pi's members decided to become a fraternity that would focus on aggressive or dominant women, also known as butch or stud women.

Gross and Smith then established Omicron Epsilon Pi as a sorority to focus on feminine lesbians. One of the goals of the sorority is to "create a haven for lesbian women where they are fully accepted without the fear of being ostracized or stereotyped."

On February 5, 2005, Kalicia Fresh and Danielle Guess were inducted as additional founders for their work and support of the sorority.

== Symbols ==
Omicron Epsilon Pi's colors are royal blue, platinum, and viridian. Its flower is the white camellia. Its jewel is the opal. Its mascot is the lioness. The sorority's motto is "Not for ourselves, but for all in diversity." The sorority Platinum Elements or pillars are Achievement, Diversity, Leadership, Pride, Service, and Sisterly Love.

== Membership ==
Omicron Epsilon Pi is a sorority with an emphasis on lesbians of color. It welcomes women of integrity and moral standing into its memberships. It is community-based, rather than a collegiate organization; its members are not required to have attended a university or college.

== Philanthropy ==
The sorority created Omicron E.M.P.O.W.E.R.ment as its charitable nonprofit. Omicron E.M.P.O.W.E.R.ment was incorporated in the State of Georgia on February 1, 2018. Its activities include serving the community, empowering youth, and helping to develop future leaders. Its current priorities are domestic violence, equal rights, homelessness, LGBT parenting, and suicide prevention.

Annually in May, it events nationwide to remember the life and death of Sakia Gunn, a 15-year-old feminine dominant lesbian who was murdered after she turned down the advances of Richard McCullough. It provides seminars and collaborates with community organizations during National Suicide Prevention Week. It provides support and education about LGBT parenting each February. The sorority also works to address domestic violence each October during National Domestic Violence Awareness Month. In November, it works with local service providers to help address homelessness for National Homelessness Month.

== Governance ==
Omicron Epsilon Pi is managed by an executive board. It is organized into six regions of the United States.

- North Western: Alaska, Idaho, Montana, Oregon, Washington, and Wyoming
- South Western: Arizona, California, Colorado, Hawaii, Nevada, New Mexico, and Utah
- North Central: Illinois, Indiana, Iowa, Michigan, Minnesota, Nebraska, North Dakota, Ohio, South Dakota, and Wisconsin
- South Central: Arkansas, Kansas, Louisiana, Mississippi, Missouri, Oklahoma, and Texas
- North Eastern: Connecticut, Delaware, District of Columbia, Maine, Maryland, Massachusetts, New Hampshire, New Jersey, New York, Pennsylvania, Rhode Island, and Vermont
- South Eastern: Alabama, Florida, Georgia, Kentucky, North Carolina, South Carolina, Tennessee, Virginia, and West Virginia

== See also ==
- List of LGBT and LGBT-friendly fraternities and sororities
