= Phi Rho Eta =

American collegiate social fraternity

- ΦΡΗ
- Founded: August 22, 1994; 31 years ago Southern Illinois University
- Type: Social
- Affiliation: Independent
- Status: Active
- Scope: Regional
- Motto: "Pride, Respect, Excellence"
- Colors: Maroon and Old Gold
- Symbol: Phoenix
- Flower: Sunflower
- Chapters: 5 active
- Colonies: 3
- Nicknames: Etas
- Headquarters: P.O. Box 490645; Chicago, Illinois 60649; United States
- Website: phirhoeta.org

Phi Rho Eta (ΦΡΗ) is an African American collegiate fraternity. It was established in 1994 at Southern Illinois University in Carbondale, Illinois. It has chartered seven chapters in the United States.

== History ==
LaMont Taylor and Marvin Randolph met through their membership in Alpha Phi Omega at Southern Illinois University in Carbondale, Illinois and went on to determined the ideas and implementation for Phi Rho Eta. Taylor and Randolph wanted to establish an organization for men that it would promote the principles of pride, respect, and excellence; set the standard of manhood; and teach exemplary positive behavior.

They formed the Charismatic Brotherhood of Phi Rho Eta Fraternity, Inc. on August 22, 1994. Phi Rho Eta is an African American social fraternity based on three principles: pride, respect, and excellence through community development, academics, and social interactions. The fraternity operates independently and is not affiliated with a national fraternity councils.

Phi Rho Eta has chartered seven collegiate chapters and two alumni chapters in the Midwestern United States. Its national headquarters are in Chicago, Illinois.

== Symbols ==
Phi Rho Eta's colors are maroon and old gold. Its symbol is the phoenix. Its flower is the sunflower. Its motto is "Pride, Respect, Excellence". Its nicknames are Etas.

== Philanthropy ==
The national philanthropy of the fraternity is the Mentor Teacher Brother program, created by the fraternity in 1994. Through this program, fraternity members service as mentors for Black students at local high schools. Chapters also participate in other events, such as raising funds to Relay for Life.

== Chapters ==
=== Undergraduate chapters ===
In the following list, active chapters are noted in bold and inactive chapters noted in italics.

Name	Charter date and range	Institution	Location	Status	Ref.
**Alpha**	August 22, 1994	Southern Illinois University Carbondale	Carbondale, Illinois	Active	
**Beta**	1996	Chicago State University - Citywide	Chicago, Illinois	Active	
**Gamma**	1997	University of Illinois Urbana-Champaign	Urbana, Illinois	Active	
Delta	2005–c. 2008	University of Louisville	Louisville, Kentucky	Inactive	
**Epsilon**	2008	Eastern Illinois University	Charleston, Illinois	Active	
**Zeta**	2009	Northern Illinois University	DeKalb, Illinois	Active	
Eta	2009–June 2013	Western Illinois University	Macomb, Illinois	Inactive	
**WVSU Colony**		West Virginia State University	Institute, West Virginia	Colony	(Note: Colony established in 2011.)
**Mizzou Colony**		University of Missouri	Columbia, Missouri	Colony	(Note: Colony established in 2015.)
**ISU Colony**		Illinois State University	Normal, Illinois	Colony	(Note: Colony established in 2020.)

=== Alumni chapters ===
In the following list, active chapters are noted in bold and inactive chapters noted in italics.

Chapter	Charter date and range	Location	Status	Ref.
**Eta Alpha**	1997	Chicago, Illinois	Active	
**Eta Beta**	2005	Urbana, Illinois	Active	

== See also ==
- List of African-American fraternities and sororities
- List of social fraternities and sororities
