= Alpha Kappa Nu =

African-American fraternity

- ΑΚΝ
- Founded: October 1903; 122 years ago Indiana University East
- Type: Social
- Affiliation: Independent
- Status: Defunct
- Defunct date: 1911
- Emphasis: African American
- Scope: Local
- Colors: Black and White
- Chapters: 2
- Headquarters: Richmond, Indiana; United States

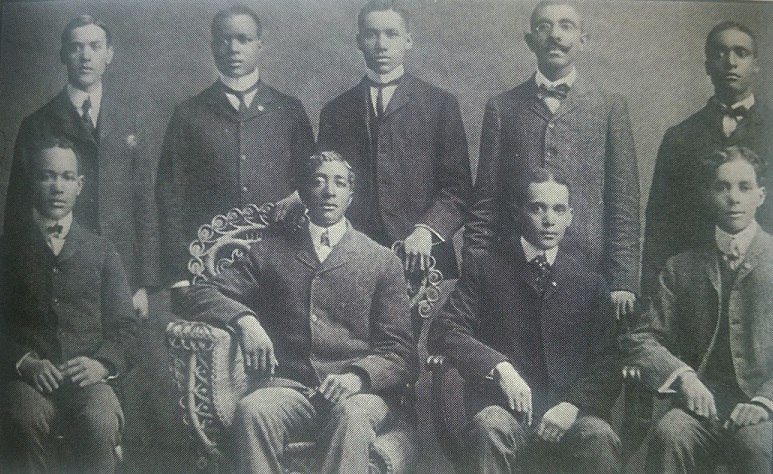
Alpha Kappa Nu founders: seated James Knight, Howard Thompson, E. B. Keemer and Fred Williamson. Standing are John Hodge, Thomas Reynolds, Mr. Hill, R. A. Roberts, and Gordon Merri

Alpha Kappa Nu (ΑΚΝ) was one of the first documented African-American collegiate fraternal organizations in the United States. It formed in 1903 at Indiana University in Richmond (now Indiana University East) and lasted until around 1905. Its membership included all Black male students at the university.

== History ==
Alpha Kappa Nu Society formed as a social club in 1903 at Indiana University in Richmond (now Indiana University East). Its membership included ten men, all of the Black students at the university. Its founders included Mr. Hill, John Hodge, E. B. Keemer, James Knight, Gordon Merri, Thomas Reynolds, R. A. Roberts, Howard Thompson, and Fred Williamson.

The purpose of Alpha Kappa Nu was to "strengthen the negro voice." Newspaper accounts from 1903 and 1905 identified the organization as a Greek fraternity with elected officers and a constitution with "plans of establishing branches at leading negro institutions". In 1904, the second chapter was set to be established at Wilberforce University.

Although Alpha Kappa Nu was never incorporated, it was one of the first documented African-American collegiate fraternal organizations in the United States. (Note: In The Story of Kappa Alpha Psi: A History of the Beginning and Development of A College Greek Letter Organization 1911-1999, historian Ralph J. Bryson recounted that his fraternity "may have begun in 1903 on the campuses of Indiana University in Bloomington, IN, but there were too few registrants to assure continuing organization". Thus, the two groups claim to be the first fraternity for Blacks.) Its Alpha chapter was the first Black college fraternity to own its own house. Although the fraternity was stated to have lasted until 1911, some sources say it lasted for fourteen months.

After the dissolution of Alpha Kappa Nu, at least two of its founders—John Hodge and Thomas Reynolds—joined the Upsilon chapter of Alpha Phi Alpha at the University of Kansas. Bryson states that the original name (Kappa Alpha Nu) of the Black fraternity Kappa Alpha Psi may have been chosen in tribute to the short-lived fraternity.

== Symbols ==
There is no concrete evidence as to why the Greek letters Kappa Alpha Nu were chosen. Speculation is that Kappa is the tenth letter of the Greek alphabet and there were ten founders, Alpha is the first letter of the Greek alphabet and this was the as being the first Black fraternity at I.U., and Nu perhaps for Negro.

== See also ==
- History of North American fraternities and sororities
- List of African-American Greek and fraternal organizations
