= Nu Gamma Alpha =

African American fraternity

- ΝΓΑ
- Coat of Arms of Nu Gamma Alpha
- Founded: 1962; 64 years ago Howard University
- Type: Social
- Affiliation: Independent
- Status: Active
- Emphasis: African American
- Scope: National
- Pillars: Empowering, Enhancing, Engaging and Enduring, Professionalism, Unity, Loyalty, and Integrity
- Colors: Burgundy and White
- Chapters: 1 active collegiate 4 alumni
- Headquarters: P.O. Box 37661; Raleigh, North Carolina 27627; United States
- Website: nugammaalphaorg.wixsite.com

Nu Gamma Alpha Fraternity, Gents, Ltd. (NGA or ΝΓΑ) is an African American social fraternity. It was established in 1962 at Howard University in Washington, D.C. It has chartered at least twenty chapters in the United States.

== History ==
Ronald Gilkes and Robert Coates established Nu Gamma Alpha in 1962 at Howard University in Washington, D.C. It was a "quasi-serious" fraternity modeled after established Black Greek-letter organizations. Its charter members came from Howard and American University, including:

- Larkin Arnold
- Eddie Cleveland
- Robert Coates
- Gary Cole
- Arnie Evans
- Eric Garrison
- Ronald Gilkes
- Arvelle Greenwood
- William Hall
- Dennis S. Houston
- Althear Lester
- Luther McAdams

A second chapter, Beta, was formed at Lincoln College (now Lincoln University) in 1966. The fraternity was incorporated in the State of North Carolina.

As of 2024, the fraternity had chartered at least twenty collegiate chapters, with its only active chapter being the newly reestablished chapter at Shaw University. Its main activities take place through its four alumni chapters. The fraternity's mission includes fostering brotherhood, spiritual values, social change, and economic resources. Member raise funds for scholarships and volunteer for community organizations. Its national headquarters is in Raleigh, North Carolina.

== Symbols ==
The Greek letters Nu Gamma Alpha were selected to stand for "No Gottum Average" because "anti-intellectualism" and a grade point average under 3.0 were conditions for membership. The fraternity's colors are burgundy and white. Its principles or pillars are Empowering, Enhancing, Engaging and Enduring, Professionalism, Unity, Loyalty, and Integrity.

== Chapters ==
=== Collegiate chapters ===
Following are the college chapters of Nu Gamma Alpha, with active chapters indicated in bold and inactive chapters in italics.

Chapter	Charter date	Institution	Location	Status	Ref.
Alpha	1962	Howard University	Washington, D.C.	Inactive	
Beta	1966	Lincoln College	Lower Oxford Township, Pennsylvania	Inactive	
Gamma	November 1967	Livingston College	Salisbury, North Carolina	Inactive	
Delta	Spring 1968	Johnson C. Smith University	Charlotte, North Carolina	Inactive	
Epsilon	Fall 1968	North Carolina A&T State University	Greensboro, North Carolina	Inactive	
Zeta	1969	Winston-Salem State University	Winston-Salem, North Carolina	Inactive	
Theta	Spring 1970	North Carolina Central University	Durham, North Carolina	Inactive	
Iota	October 5, 1971	University of Arkansas Pine Bluff	Pine Bluff, Arkansas	Inactive	(Note: The chapter was formed from the Wine SI FI Society, established in 1966 at Arkansas Agricultural, Mechanical and Normal College. The college became the University of Arkansas Pine Bluff in 1972.)
Kappa	Fall 1970	St. Augustine's College	Raleigh, North Carolina	Inactive	
Lambda		Virginia Union University	Richmond, Virginia	Inactive	
Nu		City College of New York	New York City, New York	Inactive	
**Omicron**	Fall 1968–1979; Spring 2024	Shaw University	Raleigh, North Carolina	Active	
Pi		Benedict College	Columbia, South Carolina	Inactive	
Rho		Kean College	New York City, New York	Inactive	
Omega	Spring 1974	North Carolina State University	Raleigh, North Carolina	Inactive	
Beta Kappa	197x ?	Chicago State University	Chicago, Illinois	Inactive	
Sigma Nu	Spring 1977	Aurora University	Aurora, Illinois	Inactive	
Sigma Tau	Spring 1979	Northeastern University	Boston, Massachusetts	Inactive	
		Cheyney State University	Cheyney, Pennsylvania	Inactive	
		Knoxville College	Knoxville, Tennessee	Inactive	

=== Alumni chapters ===
Chapter	Location	Status	Ref.
**Arkansas**	Arkansas	Active	
**Atlanta**	Atlanta, Georgia	Active	
**Raleigh**	Raleigh, North Carolina	Active	
**Triad**	Greensboro, High Point, and Winston-Salem, North Carolina	Active	

== Notable members ==
- Larkin Arnold (Alpha), entertainment lawyer, talent management executive, and vice president of Capitol Records and Arista Records, and CBS/Sony Music
- James E. Cheek (Alpha, honorary), president of Howard University

== See also ==
- List of African American fraternities and sororities
- List of social fraternities
