= Kappa Psi Kappa =

American non-collegiate service fraternity

- ΚΨΚ
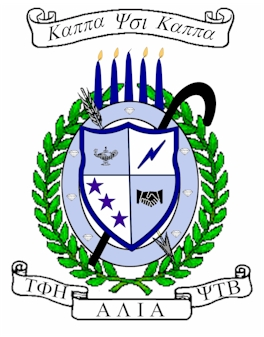
- Founded: August 17, 2001; 25 years ago Florida State University
- Type: Service and social
- Affiliation: Independent
- Status: Active
- Emphasis: LGBT
- Scope: National
- Motto: "One Brotherhood, One Bond"
- Colors: Baby Blue, Gold, and Black
- Symbol: Cane
- Flower: White Thorn Rose
- Jewel: Platinum White Diamond
- Publication: Apollo's Dream
- Philanthropy: Project P.U.R.I.F.Y.
- Chapters: 8
- Members: 200+ lifetime
- Headquarters: P.O. Box 465; Roosevelt, New York 11575; United States
- Website: www.kappapsikappa.org

Kappa Psi Kappa (ΚΨΚ) is a non-profit, non-collegiate, service/social fraternity for "progressive" men of all ethnic backgrounds and cultures. The fraternity was established in Tallahassee, Florida in 2001. The fraternity has initiated more than 200 members in the United States.

== History ==
Kappa Psi Kappa was founded by five men on the campus of Florida State University in Tallahassee, Florida on August 17, 2001. They were known as the Illustrious Elite. In the summer of 2001, these men set out and started to organize the foundation of the fraternity based upon promoting brotherhood, scholarship, service and leadership. The fraternity was incorporated in the State of Florida on October 3, 2001.

== Symbols and traditions ==
The heraldic crest of Kappa Psi Kappa contains ten symbolic elements, each of which carries a special meaning to the fraternity. The motto of the fraternity is "One Brotherhood, One Bond." The fraternity's mascot is the White Bengal tiger, representing the rarity, beauty, and strength of a man of Kappa Psi Kappa.

The fraternity's colors are baby blue, gold, and black. Its symbol is the cane. Its flower is the white thorn rose. Its jewel is the platinum white diamond. Its publication is Apollo's Dream.

The highest honor bestowed by Kappa Psi Kappais the status of Constellation member. A Constellation is a member who is recognized by the fraternity as being a leading figure, mentor, who has demonstrated exemplary service to both brotherhood and community.

== Activities ==
Though chapters organize their own community events throughout the year, there are three fraternity-sponsored service initiatives that Kappa Psi Kappa chapters participate in alongside other chapters across the nation: Project B.O.O.K. (Bank of Opportunistic Knowledge), Project 2001 Hours Served, and Midas Touch.

== Membership ==
Membership into the Kappa Psi Kappa Brotherhood is open to any man over the age of 18 who has obtained his high school diploma or GED. Current enrollment in an institute of higher learning is not a requirement for membership.

Because Kappa Psi Kappa is a service-social organization, community service is not only a requirement to maintain active status membership within the fraternity, it is also a requirement to apply for membership.

Kappa Psi Kappa has intake classes twice per year, in the spring, and fall. Once a pledge has successfully completed the membership intake class or line and meets all required prerequisites for membership, full membership into the brotherhood is conferred.

Kappa Psi Kappa has implemented a strict ban on hazing activities.

== Chapters ==
Kappa Psi Kappa chapters are assigned a sequential Greek letter designation according to the order in which they were chartered. The oldest is the Alpha chapter, located in Tallahassee, FL. Subsequent chapters were assigned successive letters of the Greek alphabet. After all single-letter designations were used, chapters were assigned double-letter combinations in the fashion "Alpha Alpha," "Alpha Beta," "Alpha Gamma," etc. The designation "Alpha Omega Kappa" is reserved as a symbolic "Chapter Eternal" for all Eternal Diamonds, members who have died.

Kappa Psi Kappa chapters and colonies are metropolitan based, serving the cities in which the charter member lives and then extending for a two-hour radius.

Below is a list of Kappa Psi Kappa. Active chapters are indicated in bold. Inactive chapters are in italics.

Chapter	Charter date and range	Location	Status	Ref.
**Alpha**		Tallahassee, Florida	Active	
Beta			Inactive	
Gamma			Inactive	
**Delta**		Chicago, Illinois	Active	
Epsilon			Inactive	
**Zeta**		Atlanta, Georgia	Active	
**Eta**		Philadelphia, Pennsylvania	Active	
Theta			Inactive	
Iota			Inactive	
Kappa			Inactive	
**Lambda**		Boston, Massachusetts	Active	
**Mu**		Raleigh, North Carolina	Active	
**Nu**		New York City, New York	Active	
**Alpha Zeta**		Detroit, Michigan	Active	
**Alpha Omega Kappa**			Memorial	

== Governance ==
=== Governing structure ===
Kappa Psi Kappa Fraternity, Inc is governed by its national executive board which is made up of seven voting positions known as the executive board and four non-voting positions known as the administrative staff

Executive Board

- Supreme President – elected leader of the fraternity who is responsible for national plan of actions and vision
- First Supreme Anti-President – responsible for membership intake, international membership, and honorary memberships
- Second Supreme Anti-President – responsible for membership expansion, colonization, and reactivation
- Third Supreme Anti-President – responsible for community service, fraternal philanthropy, and scholarship
- Supreme Keeper of Record – responsible for fraternal meetings, minutes, and agendas
- Supreme Keeper of Exchequer – responsible for fraternal finances.
- National Executive Director – responsible for day-to-day business, national committees, and administrative positions.

Administrative staff

- Supreme Epistoleus – fraternal historian
- Supreme Editor-In-Chief – responsible for Apollo's Dream
- Supreme Guard – responsible for ensuring that all fraternal policies adhere to the national constitution
- Supreme Chaplain
- Webmaster

=== Convention ===
Kappa Psi Kappa is governed by its Convention called Conclave, which is officially the highest authority in the fraternity. Conclave is held biannually in conjunction with the other organizations of Tau Kappa Phi. As a body, comprises delegates from every active chapter, as well as member-at-large representatives and the fraternity's National Executive Board. The first Conclave was held in 2006 in Orlando, Florida. Previously the location of Conclave changed with every convening, but in 2014 it was decided that Conclave would be permanently hosted in Atlanta, Georgia.

== Tau Kappa Phi ==
The history of the Kappa Family is unique because the family was not formed all at one time. Kappa Psi Kappa's founding on August 17, 2001, in Tallahassee, Florida marked the beginning of it. On February 20, 2002, the sorority and fraternity pair of Phi Nu Kappa and Alpha Psi Kappa were formed on the Florida State University campus. They joined the Kappa Family on March 28, 2002. The last organization to join was the Kappa Sapphires founded on April 8, 2002. The Kappa Family gave itself Greek letters on August 13, 2002. Tau Kappa Phi (The Kappa Family) became the Grand Chapter for all members.

== See also ==
- List of LGBT fraternities and sororities
