= Kappa Epsilon Psi =

American professional military sorority

- ΚΕΨ
- Founded: April 4, 2011; 15 years ago Pembroke Pines, Florida, U.S.
- Type: Service
- Affiliation: PFA
- Status: Active
- Emphasis: Military
- Scope: National
- Motto: "Many women have done noble things, we excel them all."
- Colors: Purple and Rose Pink
- Symbol: Antique Key, Rosie-the-Riveter
- Flower: New Dawn Rose
- Chapters: 41
- Headquarters: 3951 Snapfinger Parkway, Suite 400; Decatur, Georgia 30035; United States
- Website: militarysorority.com

Kappa Epsilon Psi Military Sorority, Inc. (ΚΕΨ or KEY) is a national, non-collegiate service sorority, considered a professional (military) sorority.

== History ==
Kappa Epsilon Psi was founded on April 4, 2011, in Pembroke Pines, Florida, as an alternative to traditional Greek letter organizations for female service members. KEY is the second Greek-lettered sorority established and incorporated by U.S. Armed Forces women.

The founders are Moneka Smith (Army Reserves) and Shica Hill (Army National Guard). The first initiates (National Line Alpha) are Ciera Burts, Ariane Wyatt*, Marga Horn, Kayla Hall, Kesia Loyd-Brown, Jennifer Berry*, and Keondra Harris. Wyatt and Berry are no longer affiliated with the organization.

== Objectives ==
Kappa Epsilon Psi has three objectives:

- Honor our past female service members – Annually each active chapter will honor a female veteran (over the age of 65). The female service member is inducted as an honorary KEY member and her legacy/military service is documented.
- Unite current service members – We aspire to unite female service members of all branches of the U.S. Armed Forces. Membership is open to all female service members who are or have served honorably. Our goal is to have a member or active chapter on every military installation - stateside and abroad.
- Mentor future female leadership – Candidates with less than two years of military service are paired with a Big Sister who has more time in service & wisdom to share. Members who are retired from military service are paired with new members who wish to seek similar career paths in the civilian sector.

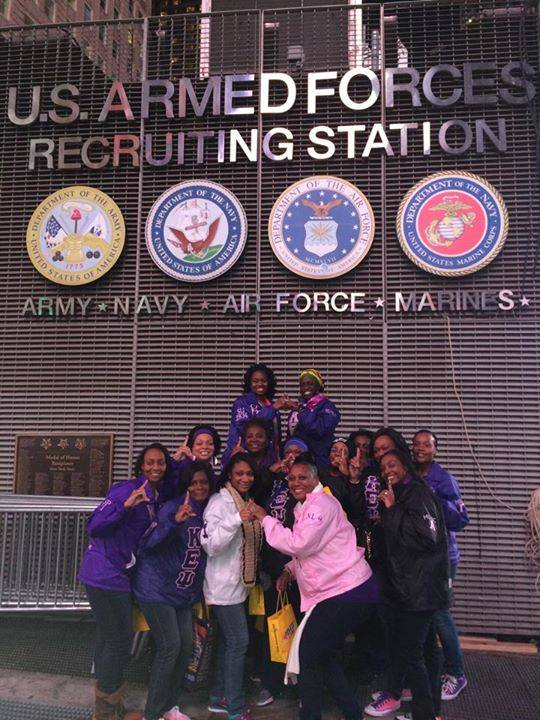
KEY Sorors outside of the Times Square Armed Forces Recruiting Station, NYC 2014.

== Symbols ==
The sorority's symbol is an antique key. Its colors are purple and pink rose. Its flower is the New Dawn Rose. Its motto is "Many women have done noble things; we excel them all."

== Chapters ==
Following is a list of Kappa Epsilon Psi chapters, with active chapters indicated in bold and inactive chapters in italics.

Chapter	Charter date and range	Location	Status	Ref.
	April 4, 2011	Pembroke Pines, Florida	Inactive	
**Alpha**		Honolulu, Hawaii	Active	
**Beta**		Fayetteville, North Carolina	Active	
**Gamma**		Atlanta, Georgia	Active	
**Delta**		Woodbridge, Virginia	Active	
**Epsilon**		Norfolk, Virginia	Active	
**Zeta**		Hampton, Virginia	Active	
**Eta**		Willingboro Township, New Jersey	Active	
**Theta**		Memphis, Tennessee	Active	
**Iota**		Hopewell, Virginia	Active	
**Kappa**		Clinton, Maryland	Active	
**Lambda**		San Antonio, Texas	Active	
**Mu**		Washington, D.C.	Active	
**Nu**		Killeen, Texas	Active	
**Xi**		Augusta, Georgia	Active	
**Omicron**		Detroit, Michigan	Active	
**Pi**		Lawton, Oklahoma	Active	
Rho		Miami, Florida	Inactive	
**Sigma**		Goldsboro, North Carolina	Active	
**Tau**		Tampa, Florida	Active	
**Upsilon**		Warner Robins, Georgia	Active	
**Phi**		Louisville, Kentucky	Active	
**Chi**		Jacksonville, Florida	Active	
**Psi**		Columbia, South Carolina	Active	
**Alpha Alpha**		Savannah, Georgia	Active	
Alpha Beta		Houston, Texas	Inactive	
**Alpha Gamma**		Little Rock, Arkansas	Active	
**Alpha Delta**		Phenix City, Alabama	Active	
**Alpha Epsilon**		Baltimore, Maryland	Active	
**Alpha Zeta**		Fredericksburg, Virginia	Active	
**Alpha Eta**		San Diego, California	Active	
**Alpha Theta**		Clarksville, Tennessee	Active	
**Alpha Iota**		El Paso, Texas	Active	
**Alpha Kappa**		Montgomery, Alabama	Active	
**Alpha Lambda**		Raleigh, North Carolina	Active	
**Alpha Mu**		Colorado Springs, Colorado	Active	
**Alpha Nu**		Charlotte, North Carolina	Active	
**Alpha Xi**		Dallas, Texas	Active	
**Alpha Pi**		Chicago, Illinois	Active	
**Alpha Rho**		Huntsville and Decatur, Alabama	Active	
**Alpha Sigma**		Crestview, Florida	Active	
**Alpha Tau**		Charleston, South Carolina	Active	
**Alpha Upsilon**		Mobile, Alabama	Active	

== Affiliations ==
- Kappa Lambda Chi Military Fraternity Inc. - Military and Veterans Fraternity: 2013
