= Delta Lambda Phi =

American gay collegiate fraternity

- ΔΛΦ
- Founded: October 15, 1986; 39 years ago Washington, D.C.
- Type: Social
- Affiliation: NIC
- Status: Active
- Emphasis: Gay
- Scope: National
- Motto: "Making Our Presence Make a Difference"
- Colors: Green, Gold, and White
- Symbol: Centaur
- Flower: Yellow Rose
- Publication: The Centaur's Yell
- Philanthropy: The Delphi Foundation
- Chapters: 8 active
- Colonies: 3
- Nickname: DLP, Lambda
- Headquarters: 2020 Pennsylvania Avenue NW, No. 355; Washington, D.C. 20006; United States
- Website: www.dlp.org

Delta Lambda Phi Social Fraternity (ΔΛΦ, DLP, or Lambda) is an American social fraternity for gay, bisexual, transgender and progressive men. The fraternity was founded in 1986 in Washington, D.C. It offers a social environment and structure similar to other Greek-model college fraternities. It was the first, and as of 2013, the only, national fraternity with an emphasis on gay and bisexual men.

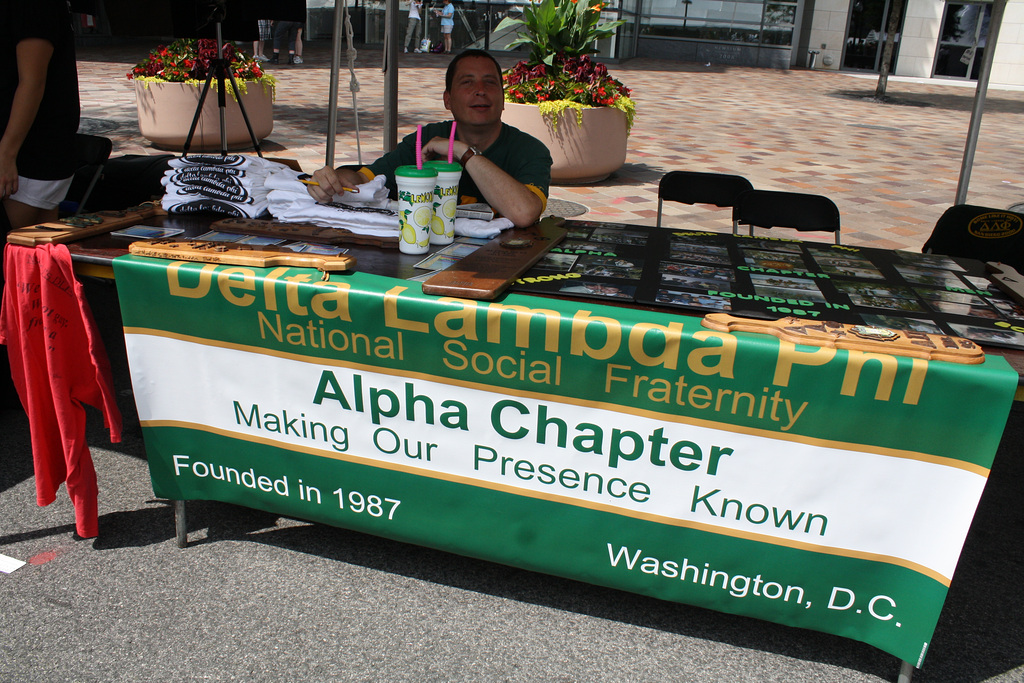
Delta Lambda Phi at 35th Annual Capital Pride Festival

== History ==
Delta Lambda Phi was founded in Washington, D.C. on October 15, 1986, by Vernon L. Strickland III. A fellow student on his university campus had been denied fraternity membership due to the presumption that he was gay. When Strickland became aware of other examples of this, he began organizing a fraternity with a more welcoming model that would not discriminate based on sexual orientation.

Strickland wrote the fraternity's ritual, selected a name and its symbols, and advertised for rush. Eligible members included gay, bisexual, and progressive straight men. According to a fraternity member, a progressive male is "a person willing to accept the virtues, ideals, and truth that gay, bisexual and transgendered [sic] people feel. They are essentially straight allied members of the gay community." The fraternity was founded with 29 members and was community-based, rather than being affiliated with a university.

The three purposes of the fraternity are:

- To develop dignified and purposeful social, service, and recreational activities for all men, irrespective of sexual orientation or gender expression;
- To lead in determining the rights and privileges of individuals in society; and,
- To present a strong and positive image that respects the diversity of all individuals.

The Washington, D.C. Area Alpha chapter was formed on April 10, 1987, with the initiation of 24 members. The fraternity was incorporated in Washington D.C. on September 10, 1987. Strickland traveled to college campuses across the United States for eighteen months, working on expanding the fraternity. In April 1988 a group of gay men at University of California, Los Angeles were recognized as the first Delta Lambda Phi chapter to be affiliated with a university. This was followed by chapters at the University of California, San Diego and the University of Minnesota. The fraternity continued to add colonies and chapters across the United States, becoming "one of the nation's fastest-growing fraternities".

In August 1995, the University of Minnesota chapter opened a residential house in a former Chi Phi chapter house on fraternity row. This was the first chapter house for an openly gay fraternity in the United States. In 2011, the fraternity changed its charter to specifically include transgender men. The fraternity went international with the chartering of Beta Omega chapter at McGill University in Montreal in 2012, although that chapter has since closed. It established fourteen chapters between 2011 and 2014.

Delta Lambda Phi has been a member of the North American Interfraternity Conference (NIC) since 2013. The fraternity's highest honor is the Vernon L. Strickland III Founder's Award for extraordinary service to the fraternity's brotherhood.

== Symbols and traditions ==
The Greek letters Delta (Δ) to represent the pink triangles that the Nazis made homosexuals wear and Lambda (Λ) because it is a symbol used for gay pride; however, the complete Greek meaning is known only by its members . The fraternity's initiation ritual is also secret.

The fraternity's heraldic crest consists of a yellow shield surrounded by green elements; it contains eleven symbolic elements. Above the shield, is a helmet that symbolized honor and knighthood. Its open visor indicates that Delta Lambda Phi is a non-secret society. The helmet is surrounded by mantling that suggests the fraternity's use of parliamentary procedure. On either side of the shield, scales symbolize the distribution of justice and the balance of social equity. On the scales to the left, two of the Greek letter Phi (Φ) represent the minority viewpoint; on the right, three of the Greek letter Phi (Φ) represent the majority viewpoint. At the top of the shield to the left, the inverted triangle is a reminder of the Nazi's persecution of gays and ongoing modern challenges. In the upper center of the crest, there are shaking hands which symbolize understanding and friendship. At the top of the shield to the right, a lowercase letter Lambda (λ) stands for the gay liberation movement. Below the three symbols, chevrons symbolically the shield into "an unclosed division with the past. Below the chevrons, three stars symbolize the first three chapters and the three founding purposes of the fraternity, while a burning lamp at the bottom represents ancient justice and enlightenment. Below the shield is a scroll with the fraternity's name.

The fraternity's mascot is the Lambda Centaur, which is modeled after Chiron, the only immortal centaur from Greek mythology who was regarded as gentle and wise. The fraternity's version of the centaur is younger and clean-shaven, with short hair—the "essence of masculinity". The fraternity's colors are green, gold, and white. The fraternity flower is the yellow rose.

When formed, the fraternity's slogan was, "What others try to hide in shame, we boldly embrace with pride." The formal motto of the fraternity is "Lambda Men are Making Their Presence Known." The fraternity's toasting song, "Delta Phi (There Once Was a Mighty Lambda Man" is as follows:

There once was a mighty Lambda man

Who lived by the sword

Crushed by the rogue hoard

With a whirl of steel he took the fight

And won the prince's heart that night

== Membership ==
Delta Lambda Phi's membership is open to all men, whether gay, bisexual, transgender, or straight. Campus and multi-campus chapters are generally open to male college-aged students who live in the area. Community-based chapters do not require their members to be students.

Members are selected through a typical fraternity rush and selected bid process. Pledges are required to memorize the Greek alphabet, know the fraternity's mission, and learn the parliamentary procedure from Robert's Rules of Order. Pledges are also required to perform community service and often work with groups that have ties with the gay community.

== Philanthropy ==
The Delphi Foundation is a separately incorporated 501(c)(3) educational foundation and charitable arm of Delta Lambda Phi. The foundation offers academic scholarships to collegiate or alumni members. It also supports the Delta Force Leadership Academy, established in 2011.

== Governance and policies ==
=== Convention ===
Delta Lambda Phi is governed by its convention, which is officially the highest authority in the fraternity. The convention is held annually and, as a body, comprises two members from every active chapter, as well as alumni representatives and the fraternity's board of directors. The first convention was held in 1989 in San Francisco. The location of the convention changes from year to year and is selected by the fraternity staff.

=== Board of directors ===
The fraternity's board of directors (BOD) governs the fraternity between conventions and consists of eleven elected members, three ex officio members, and Life Members. Members who have served on the board for ten or more years can be appointed Life Member by the action of the annual convention. The executive director and general counsel are appointed by the trustees and confirmed by the board of directors. The executive director oversees the day-to-day affairs of the fraternity.

The fraternity recognizes three broad geographic regions—Eastern, Central, and Western. Each region is overseen by a regional steering committee, and also hosts two regional conferences; one in the spring, and one in the fall. Like the location of the Convention, regional conference locations are generally rotated.

=== Hands-off policy ===
The Corporate Brother-Pledge Relations Policy states that brothers and pledges may not engage in "extra-fraternal relations" during the rush and pledge education periods. The policy aims to ensure that bid distribution remains fair, that pledge education is focused on platonic fraternal bonding, and that the risk of sexual harassment is minimized. No corporate policy prohibits two members from engaging in extra-fraternal relations after they become brothers. Because the student-teacher relationship that existed during the pledge education process no longer exists, all brothers are regarded as peers and are simply encouraged to exercise their best judgment.

Sexual relationships between brothers and pledges are forbidden. The policy governing these relationships is the Corporate Brother-Pledge Relations Policy, known informally as the "Hands-Off Policy". The policy has existed in various forms since the early years of the fraternity, and it was codified and adopted by the national convention in 1998.

== Chapters ==
Delta Lambda Phi has three types of chapters: campus-based, multi-campus based, and community-based. As of 2025, it has eight active chapters and three colonies.

== Alumni associations ==
Founded in 2003, the Delta Lambda Phi Alumni Association (DLPAA) is governed by an elected board of directors. The DLPAA also allows for the creation of local alumni associations (LAAs). LAAs can be either in support of a specific chapter or location-based. Following is a list of Delta Lambda Phi alumni chapters.

Chapter	Location	Status	References
Alpha Alpha Alumni Association	Tempe, Arizona	Active	
Alpha Centauri Alumni Association	Washington, D.C.	Active	
Alpha Psi Alumni Association	Kent, Ohio	Active	
Alpha Rho Alumni Association	State College, Pennsylvania	Active	
Beta Omega Alumni Association	Montreal, Quebec, Canada	Inactive	
Beta Sigma Alumni Association	New Brunswick, New Jersey	Active	
Beta Xi Alumni Association	New York City, New York	Active	
Central Florida Alumni Association	Orlando, Florida	Active	
Chicagoland Alumni Association	Chicago, Illinois	Active	
Gamma Gamma Alumni Association	Iowa City, Iowa	Active	
Greater San Diego Alumni Association	San Diego, California	Active	
Heartland Alumni Association	Kansas City, Missouri	Active	
Iota Alumni Association	Sacramento, California	Active	
LAA of the Massachusetts Bay	Boston, Massachusetts	Active	
Mid-Michigan Alumni Association	Lansing, Michigan	Active	
Omega Chapter Alumni Association	Tucson, Arizona	Active	
Raleigh Area Alumni Association	Raleigh, North Carolina	Active	
St. Louis Alumni Association	St. Louis, Missouri	Active	
Seattle Alumni Association	Seattle, Washington	Active	
South Florida Alumni Association	Miami, Florida	Active	
Twin Cities Alumni Association	Minneapolis, Minnesota	Active	

== Notable members ==
- Henry Berg-Brousseau (Alpha Second) – transgender rights activist
- Todd Gloria (Alpha Delta) – mayor of San Diego
- Chip Sarafin (Alpha Alpha) – firstly openly gay professional football player

== See also ==
- List of LGBTQ and LGBTQ-friendly fraternities and sororities
- List of social fraternities
