= Pearl (color) =

Color

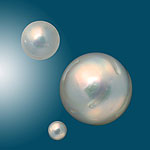
Pearls

Pearl
#EAE0C8

The color pearl is a pale tint of off-white. It is a representation of the average color of a pearl.

The first recorded use of pearl as a color name in English was in 1604.

The color is used in interior design when an off-white tint is desired.

== Cultured pearl ==
Cultured pearl

Color coordinates
- Hex triplet: #F5F5F5
- sRGB^{B} (r, g, b): (245, 245, 245)
- HSV (h, s, v): (0°, 0%, 96%)
- CIELCh_{uv} (L, C, h): (97, 0, 0°)
- Source: Crayola
- ISCC–NBS descriptor: White
- B: Normalized to [0–255] (byte)

Cultured pearl is one of crayon colors issued by Crayola in its 16-pack of Pearl Brite Crayons.

== See also ==
- List of colors
