= Pi Gamma Omicron =

African American collegiate fraternity (defunct)

- ΠΓΟ
- Founded: January 1, 1905; 121 years ago Ohio State University
- Type: Social
- Affiliation: Independent (pre-NPHC)
- Status: Defunct
- Defunct date: c. 1908
- Emphasis: African-Americans
- Scope: Local
- Chapters: 1 (now dormant)
- Members: 12 lifetime
- Headquarters: Columbus, Ohio; United States

Pi Gamma Omicron (ΠΓΟ) was one of the first documented Black collegiate fraternities. It was founded in 1905 at Ohio State University.

== History ==
Pi Gamma Omicron was founded in 1905 at Ohio State University in Columbus, Ohio. It was one of the first documented Black collegiate fraternities. The fraternity's twelve founding members were Leroy Barnett, William Berry, W. E. Davis, Richard Pettiford, Elmer A. Shackelford, John Shavers, Norman Thorne, H. A. Turner, C. C. Underwood, Walter Williams, and William Woodward.

Pi Gamma Omicron initially desired to become a national fraternity by establishing chapters in Michigan, Minnesota, Illinois, and Indiana according to the Beta Theta Pi correspondent at Ohio State University, but this expansion did not occur.

The group was not known by the Ohio State's registrars office but was known to The Chicago Defender newspaper which wrote an article about Pi Gamma Omicron. This article about Pi Gamma Omicron inspired Alpha Phi Alpha founder Robert H. Ogle to transform Alpha Phi Alpha from a literary society into a fraternity.

== See also ==
- List of African-American fraternities and sororities
