= Sigma Phi Beta (fraternity) =

American LGBT collegiate fraternity

- ΣΦΒ
- Founded: September 28, 2003; 22 years ago Tempe, Arizona
- Type: Social
- Affiliation: Independent
- Status: Defunct
- Defunct date: c. 2017
- Emphasis: LGBT
- Scope: National
- Motto: "Believe... And none can hinder thee."
- Member badge
- Colors: Midnight blue and Moonlight Silver
- Flower: Green Carnation
- Mascot: Griffin
- Chapters: 3
- Headquarters: Post Office Box 937; Tempe, Arizona 85280-0937; United States

Sigma Phi Beta (ΣΦΒ) was an American college fraternity for gay, straight, bisexual, and transgender men. It was founded at Arizona State University in 2003.

== History ==
Sigma Phi Beta originated as the Beta chapter of a now-defunct fraternity with similar values, Alpha Lambda Tau at Arizona State University in Tempe, Arizona. Beta disaffiliated from Alpha Lambda Tau on May 11, 2003. Its members formed Sigma Phi Beta on September 28, 2003.

Sigma Phi Beta's objective was to provide a "uniquely diverse safe space for gay men within the traditional Greek system." It held a constitutional convention and organized a national parent organization on July 17, 2005, adopting a constitution and bylaws and electing its first fraternity council. Sam Holdren was the fraternity's first national president.

Beta chapter at Indiana University in Bloomington became a colony on November 13, 2009, and a chapter in Fall 2010. Gamma chapter at Ohio State University in Columbus became a chapter on March 22, 2014.

The fraternity's national headquarters was in Tempe, Arizona. It went defunct sometime around 2017.

== Symbols ==
Sigma Phi Beta's motto was "Believe...And none can hinder thee." Its colors were midnight blue and moonlight silver. The fraternity's flower was the green carnation.

The fraternity's mascot, the heraldic Griffin, was prominent on the member's pin, with two griffins facing each other in blue and green. Its pin was circular, with a white field, encircled in a blue border. The fraternity's logo exhibited the Greek letters ΣΦΒ rendered in white on a blue background, in three linked black circles.

== Membership ==
The fraternity was open to all who identify as male; the first transgender member of Sigma Phi Beta joined in 2010. Sigma Phi Beta required members to be full-time students with a GPA of 2.5 or better. Sigma Phi Beta prioritized gender identity over assigned gender, allowing transgender men to join. By the fraternity's gender policy, members were not required to be legally male or assigned male at birth.

== Chapters ==
Following are the chapters of Sigma Phi Beta.

Chapter	Charter date	Institution	Location	Status	Ref.
Alpha	September 28, 2003	Arizona State University	Tempe, Arizona	Inactive	
Beta	Fall 2010	Indiana University Bloomington	Bloomington, Indiana	Inactive	
Gamma	March 22, 2014 – c. 2017	Ohio State University	Columbus, Ohio	Inactive	

== See also ==
- List of LGBT and LGBT-friendly fraternities and sororities
