= National Archives for Black Women's History =

National Archives for Black Women's History (formerly the National Council of Negro Women's National Library, Archives, and Museum) is an archive located at 3300 Hubbard Rd, Landover, Maryland. It is dedicated to cataloguing, restoring and preserving the documents and photographs of African-American women. The collection work began in 1935 and was formalized into the National Archives for Black Women's History in 1978. Originally housed at 1318 Vermont Avenue, Washington, D.C., in the carriage house of the former home of Mary McLeod Bethune, which is now a National Historic Site, the archive was controversially moved in 2014 by the National Park Service citing concerns over the inadequacy of the original site for preservation of its collection.

== History ==
In August 1935, Mary Ritter Beard, one of the co-founders of the World Center for Women's Archives, wrote to Dorothy B. Porter, librarian and curator at Howard University to solicit her help in gathering archival materials on African-American women for preservation. Other black women Beard recruited to help with the project included Mary McLeod Bethune, who would found of the National Council of Negro Women on 5 December 1935; two prior presidents of the National Association of Colored Women, Elizabeth Carter Brooks and Mary Church Terrell; and Sue Bailey Thurman, an author, lecturer and historian. Because the Washington, D.C. branch of the World Center for Women's Archives would not allow the black women to join, Beard worked directly with the black women's committee to collect and preserve their archives. The first chair of the committee, Porter, also recruited Juanita Mitchell, the first black woman lawyer in Maryland to serve with the other women on the committee.

The first exhibit of collected materials was hosted in December 1939 in Washington, D.C., in conjunction with Beard and the World Center for Women's Archives. Though she proposed that the committee collect archival material for an exhibit for the American Negro Exposition to be hosted the following year in Chicago, the Women's Archives dissolved in 1940, and the committee continued on its own. Bethune proposed that they begin work to acquire a building that could serve as both the headquarters of the National Council of Negro Women and an archive of black women's history. The committee raised funds for the exhibit and produced it on their own. That same year, Thurmon founded the Aframerican Women's Journal and used the journal as a platform to raise awareness for the archives and ask for women to submit their documents. In 1942, Porter resigned from the committee because of increasing demands of her time from the Moorland Foundation. Thurman became chair in 1944, and in 1945 began a funding drive to raise money for collecting records and acquiring a property.

In 1946, the committee organized a National Archives Day, publicizing the event with churches, libraries and other organizations in Washington, D.C. The Fall 1946 issue of Aframerican carried a full-page article soliciting archival materials and that same year a radio script which recorded the history of Sojourner Truth, Harriet Tubman and Phyllis Wheatly was created by the archives committee. It aired on WWDC radio, as On This We Stand, the following June. In 1949, Thurman met with reporters from the Chicago Courier and Chicago Defender to help them promote the work of the National Archives, and Museum Department of the National Council of Negro Women. Throughout the 1950s, the committee continued to solicit archival materials and hosted an exhibit featuring historic dolls made by sculptor, Meta Warrick Fuller, and a quilt depicting Harriet Tubman. In 1958, the committee solicited recipes from black women to publish a different kind of history—one that celebrated the collective works that characterized their community. Thurman compiled the recipes and published The Historical Cookbook of the American Negro, which not only gave recipes but included narratives on black history. It retold stories of professional women throughout history aimed at countering the belief that all black women were maids and domestics.

In the 1960s through the mid-1970s, work on the archive waned as the emphasis shifted to the Civil Rights Movement, but 1976 as part of the United States Bicentennial celebrations, Senator John Warner, assisted in getting an appropriation from Congress to renovate the property where Bethune had last lived, located at 1318 Vermont Avenue, Washington, D.C. The following year, Bettye Collier-Thomas, director of Temple University's Center for African American History and Culture, established the Bethune Museum in the property and began converting the carriage house into a facility to house the National Archives for Black Women's History. In 1978, the push to reignite the archival effort resumed, and using fund from a grant received from the National Historical Publications and Records Commission, the archives opened to researchers in November 1979. Linda J. Henry of the Schlesinger Library at the Radcliffe Institute for Advanced Study organized the archive. In 1982, the Bethune House was designated as a National Historic Site, allowing the facility to access federal funding. Nearly a decade later, in 1991, the National Park Service acquired the property. In 2014, the Park Service made a controversial decision to move the archive from the Bethune property citing concerns about the preservation of records at the facility. They were relocated to the National Park Service Museum Resource Center located at 3300 Hubbard Road in Landover, Maryland.

== Collections ==
The archives are open by appointment only. A major portion of the archival records is the collection of corporate documents relating to the National Council of Negro Women, its various branches, the museum and the house. Other collections include the papers of Mayme G. Abernathy, Helen Elsie Austin, Frances Mary Beal, Jeanetta Welch Brown, Birdia Bush, Gurthalee Clark, Polly Spiegel Cowan, Jeanne Donaldson Dago, Edmonia White Davidson, Gloria Dickinson, Madeline Mabray Kountze Dugger-Kelley, Jennie Austin Fletcher, Susie Green, Mary E. C. Gregory, Martha Sinton Harper, Euphemia Lofton Haynes, Anna Margaret Austin Haywood, Dorothy Height, Mame Mason Higgins, Eloise B. Johnson, Mildred Bell Johnson, Lois Mailou Jones, Dorothy Parker Koger, Josephine Humbles Kyles, Daisy Lampkin, Annie Malone, Maurine Gordon Perkinson, Ophelia T. Pinkard, Lucia Rapley, Faith Ringgold, Malkia Roberts, Dovey Johnson Roundtree, Ethel Heywood Smith, Mabel Keaton Staupers, Ruth Sykes, Mary B. Talbert, Carolyn McClester Thomas, Miriam Higgins Thomas, and Madam C. J. Walker, among others. There are also records and memorabilia of organizations like the Alpha Kappa Alpha sorority (Xi Omega chapter), Chi Eta Phi sorority, Eta Phi Beta sorority, and the Tau Gamma Delta sorority (Xi chapter), as well as other associations, like the National Alliance of Black Feminists. Two collections, the Martha Settle Putney Women's Army Corps Collection and the Prudence Burns Burrell Army Nurses Corps Collection, focus on black women in the military.
