= Charles and Mary Beard =

American historical scholars

Charles A. Beard and Mary Ritter Beard were an American married couple, historical scholars, and long-time colleagues in the writing of works on American history, including The Rise of American Civilization and their seven-volume History of the United States. Each also wrote extensively as an individual.

== Collaborations ==
From their home in Connecticut, Mary and Charles Beard co-authored seven books together, beginning with American Citizenship (1914), a high school textbook. Although they are named as coauthors, their contemporaries, including book reviewers and fellow historians, overlooked Mary's contributions. Historians Barbara Turoff, Ann Lane, and Nancy Cott, in their assessment of Mary Beard's works, and Ellen Nore, in her research on Charles Beard, have concluded that the Beards' collaboration was a full partnership, as the couple confirmed, but the Beards did not fully describe their individual contributions to their published works.

The Beards' other joint works include History of the United States (1921), later retitled A Study in American Civilization, and their two-volume work, The Rise of American Civilization (1927), their most notable collaboration. They also cowrote a third and fourth volume of The Rise of American Civilization series: America in Midpassage: A Study of the Idea of Civilization (1939) and The American Spirit (1942). Standalone works include The Making of American Civilization (1937) and Basic History of the United States (1944). The Beards' textbooks sold five million copies between 1912 and 1952. Basic History of the United States was their best-selling work.

The Beards' content in History of the United States differed from other textbooks through its thematic organization, as opposed to narrative history; their emphasis on "the causes and results of wars," rather than on specific military details; and inclusion of materials at the end of each chapter to develop critical thinking skills. The Beards also provided reference sources, discussion questions, research topic ideas, and suggested related works of historical fiction. In addition, their textbooks included more recent history (from 1890 to 1920), as well as the Beards' interpretation of America's role in world affairs. History of the United States and their subsequent books also included Mary Beard's expanded views on women's contributions to civilization; profiles of notable women; and topics such as women's labor, education, political status and influence, legal status, and women's rights, among others. History of the United States presents the Beards' Progressive-Era views and links democracy to economic and social conditions. The book "attracted a very broad readership" and, as Ann J. Lane later stated, it "shaped the thinking of generations of Americans."

The Rise of American Civilization (1927) integrated cultural, social, economic, and political history, as well as recognizing women's impact on these aspects of civilization. The book also described the importance of including women's perspectives in history as a whole. In America in Midpassage (1939), a political and economic examination of the 1920s and 1930s, the Beards criticized Franklin D. Roosevelt's foreign policy prior to World War II. The book also includes cultural and intellectual contributions of numerous individuals such as Eugene Debs, Jane Addams, Harriet Stanton Blatch, Florence Kelley, and others. The American Spirit: A Study of the Idea of Civilization in the United States (1942), "makes explicit the reason for their preference for the concept of civilization in dealing with the history of the United States" and its connection to democracy, citizenship, and public affairs.
