= Mina Bruere =

American banker (1865–1937)

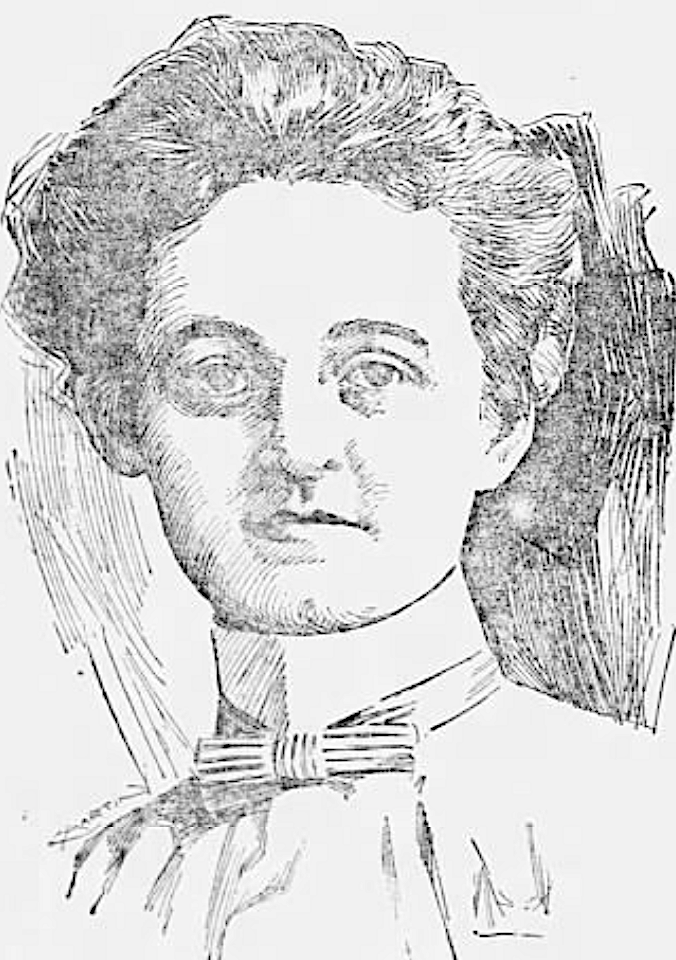
- Mina Bruere, from an 1897 newspaper
- Born: August 16, 1865; St. Charles, Missouri
- Died: March 10, 1937 (aged 71); New York City
- Occupation: Banker
- Relatives: Henry Bruère (brother)

Mina Marie Bruere (August 16, 1865 – March 10, 1937) was an American banker, president of the National Association of Bank Women from 1928 to 1930.

== Early life ==
Mina Bruere was born in St. Charles, Missouri, the daughter of John Enrst Bruere and Cornelia Solomea Schoeneich Bruere. Her father was a surgeon in the Missouri State Militia during the American Civil War. One of her brothers was Henry Bruère, president of Bowery Savings Bank; another brother, Robert, was a journalist who covered the labor movement.

== Career ==
Bruere was a singer and a charity worker as a young woman. She managed the Choral Symphony Society in St. Louis in 1897. She became secretary to Frank A. Vanderlip, president of National City Bank. During World War I, she was a leader of the New York Woman's Victory Loan Committee.

In 1922, she became assistant secretary of Central Hanover Bank and Trust, and head of the bank's women's department. She was one of the founders of the National Association of Bank Women, and president of the association from 1928 to 1930. "The day has gone past when sex was a factor in business or the professions," she explained in a 1928 interview. "The important thing to keep in mind, first, last, and always, is that a thorough grounding in financial principles and operation is absolutely essential to progress in the banking field, and that applies whether it is a man or a woman who is concerned."

Bruere was involved in political and feminist projects. In 1928 she campaigned for Al Smith when he ran for President as the Democratic candidate. In 1929, she met with Marie Curie on Curie's 62nd birthday in New York. In 1935, she worked with Lena Madesin Phillips, Inez Haynes Irwin, and Mary Ritter Beard on creating the World Center for Women's Archives. She discussed "Women in Finance" with Harriot Stanton Blatch at a 1936 event held at the Women's University Club.

== Personal life ==
Bruere died in 1937, at a hospital in New York, after a brief illness.
