= List of Gamma Phi Delta chapters =

Gamma Phi Delta is a historically African American service sorority for businesswomen, professionals, and students.

== Undergraduate chapters ==
In the following list of undergraduate chapters, active chapters are indicated in bold and inactive chapters are in italic.

| Chapter | Charter date and range | Institution | Location | Status | Ref. |
|---|---|---|---|---|---|
| **Alpha** | February 28, 1943 | Detroit Citywide | Detroit, Michigan | Active | (Note: This chapter formed at the Louis College of Business which closed in 2013. However, the chapter is still active as an undergraduate and graduate mixed chapter.) |
| Eta | May 31, 2009 | University of South Florida | Tampa, Florida | Inactive | |
| **Alpha Eta** | 2008 | University of Illinois Urbana-Champaign | Champaign, Illinois | Active | |
| Beta Kappa | | Wilberforce University | Springfield, Ohio | Inactive | |
| **Delta Gamma** | | Jackson State University | Jackson, Mississippi | Active | (Note: Chapter formed at Tougaloo College.) |
| Delta Iota | | Purdue University | West Lafayette, Indiana | Inactive | |
| Gamma Pi | November 1984 | Auburn University at Montgomery | Montgomery, Alabama | Inactive | |
| Zeta Lambda | | Virginia College | Birmingham, Alabama | Inactive | (Note: Virginia College closed in 2018.) |
| | | Oklahoma Baptist University | Shawnee, Oklahoma | Inactive | |
| | | Northwest Missouri State University | Maryville, Missouri | Inactive | |
| | | Sacred Heart University | Fairfield, Connecticut | Inactive | |
| | | University of Dubuque | Dubuque, Iowa | Inactive | |

== Graduate chapters ==
In the following list of graduate chapters, active chapters are indicated in bold and inactive chapters are in italic.

| Chapter | Charter date and range | Location | Status | Ref. |
|---|---|---|---|---|
| **Alpha** | February 28, 1943 | Detroit, Michigan | Active | |
| **Gamma** | February 1946–19xx ?, 1954 | Indianapolis, Indiana | Active | |
| **Beta** | | Detroit, Michigan | Active | |
| **Delta** | | Sacramento, California | Active | |
| Epsilon | | Miami, Florida | Inactive | |
| **Theta** | | Ecorse, Michigan | Active | |
| **Iota** | | St. Louis, Missouri | Active | |
| Kappa | | Inglewood, California | Inactive | |
| Lambda | | West Side Detroit, Michigan | Inactive | |
| **Mu** | | Philadelphia, Pennsylvania | Active | |
| Nu (First) | | Rock Hill, South Carolina | Inactive, Reassigned | |
| **Nu (Second)** | April 2005 | Tyler, Texas | Active | |
| **Xi** | | Chicago, Illinois | Active | |
| Omicron | | Springfield, Ohio | Inactive | |
| Sigma (First) | | Charlotte, North Carolina | Inactive, Reassigned | |
| Sigma (Second) | | Knoxville, Tennessee | Inactive | |
| Phi | | Anderson, Indiana | Inactive | |
| Chi | 1954 | Nashville, Tennessee | Inactive | |
| Psi | | Hanover, Pennsylvania | Inactive | |
| **Omega** | | Inkster, Michigan | Active | |
| Alpha Alpha | | Montgomery, Alabama | Inactive | |
| **Alpha Beta** | 1963 | Greensboro, North Carolina | Active | |
| Alpha Gamma (First) | 1957 | Selma, Alabama | Inactive, Reassigned | |
| **Alpha Gamma (Second)** | 2007 | Atlanta, Georgia | Active | |
| Alpha Delta | | Los Angeles, California | Inactive | |
| Alpha Epsilon | | Wichita, Kansas | Inactive | |
| Alpha Zeta | | Anniston, Alabama | Inactive | |
| **Alpha Theta** | February 6, 1960 | Detroit, Michigan | Active | |
| Alpha Iota | | Oakland, California | Inactive | |
| **Alpha Nu** | | Springfield, Ohio | Active | |
| Alpha Xi | | Birmingham, Alabama | Inactive | |
| **Alpha Omicron** | | Hyattsville, Maryland | Active | |
| **Alpha Pi** | | Montevallo, Alabama | Active | |
| **Alpha Upsilon** | 1967 | Winston-Salem, North Carolina | Active | |
| **Alpha Phi** | 1965 | Orlando, Florida | Active | |
| Alpha Psi | 1943 | Fort Worth, Texas | Inactive | |
| **Alpha Omega** | February 15, 1980 | Detroit, Michigan | Active | |
| **Beta Alpha** | 1958 | Detroit, Michigan | Active | |
| Beta Epsilon | | Los Angeles, California | Inactive | |
| Beta Zeta | | Fort Lauderdale, Florida | Inactive | |
| Beta Eta | | Charlotte, North Carolina | Inactive | |
| **Beta Mu** | 2000 | Spartanburg, South Carolina | Active | |
| **Beta Sigma** | December 1971 | Berkeley, California | Active | |
| **Beta Upsilon** | | Westlake, Ohio | Active | |
| **Beta Phi** | May 1, 1999 | Toledo, Ohio | Active | |
| Beta Omega | | Yonkers, New York | Inactive | |
| Gamma Beta | | Kansas City, Kansas | Inactive | |
| Gamma Gamma | December 9, 1972 | Austin, Texas | Inactive | |
| **Gamma Delta** | 1970 | Maitland, Florida | Active | |
| **Gamma Epsilon** | | East St. Louis, Illinois | Active | |
| **Gamma Theta** | | Phoenix, Arizona | Active | |
| Gamma Lambda | | Kettering, Ohio | Inactive | |
| **Gamma Mu** | March 23, 1986 | River Rouge, Michigan | Active | |
| Gamma Phi | February 2005 | Fort Bend County, Texas | Inactive | |
| **Gamma Chi** | | Oakland, California | Active | |
| **Delta Alpha** | June 28, 2003 | Jackson, Mississippi | Active | |
| Delta Gamma | | Omaha, Nebraska | Inactive | |
| **Delta Delta** | 1986–xxxx ?; June 9, 2008 | Tampa, Florida | Active | (Note: This chapter was reestablished in 2008.) |
| Delta Theta | | Lathrup Village, Michigan | Inactive | |
| **Delta Kappa** | | Las Vegas, Nevada | Active | |
| Delta Nu | | Detroit, Michigan | Inactive | |
| **Delta Omicron** | | Detroit, Michigan | Active | |
| **Delta Pi** | May 30, 1991 | Silver Spring, Maryland | Active | |
| **Delta Phi** | November 1998 | Fort Worth and Dallas, Texas | Active | |
| **Delta Chi** | | Los Angeles, California | Active | |
| **Epsilon Alpha** | | Union, New Jersey | Active | |
| **Epsilon Beta** | | Hazlehurst, Mississippi | Active | |
| **Epsilon Gamma** | | Clinton, New Jersey | Active | |
| **Epsilon Delta** | | South Bend, Indiana | Active | |
| **Epsilon Epsilon** | November 2019 | Anderson, South Carolina | Active | |
| **Epsilon Zeta** | November 2019 | Macon, Georgia | Active | |
| **Epsilon Eta** | | Hattiesburg, Mississippi | Active | |
| **Epsilon Theta** | | Phenix City, Alabama | Active | |
| **Epsilon Iota** | | Trenton, New Jersey | Active | |
| **Epsilon Kappa** | | Buffalo, New York | Active | |
| **Epsilon Lambda** | | Fayetteville, Arkansas | Active | |
| **Epsilon Mu** | November 2022 | Metro Houston, Texas | Active | |
| **Epsilon Nu** | November 2022 | Charlotte, North Carolina | Active | |
| **Epsilon Xi** | November 2022 | Lufkin, Texas | Active | |
| **Epsilon Omicron** | | Collierville, Tennessee | Active | |
| **Epsilon Pi** | | Delaware County, Pennsylvania | Active | |
| **Zeta Alpha** | | Memphis, Tennessee | Active | |
| **Mu Omicron** | May 24, 1997 | Arlington County, Virginia | Active | |
| **Nu Phi** | February 25, 2017 | Cincinnati, Ohio | Active | |
| **Xi Beta** | 2006 | Orlando, Florida | Active | |
| **Alpha Gamma Nu** | October 15, 2016 | Egg Harbor Township, New Jersey | Active | |
