= Pensole Lewis College of Business and Design =

Defunct school in Michigan, US

Coordinates: 42°21′40″N 83°03′53″W

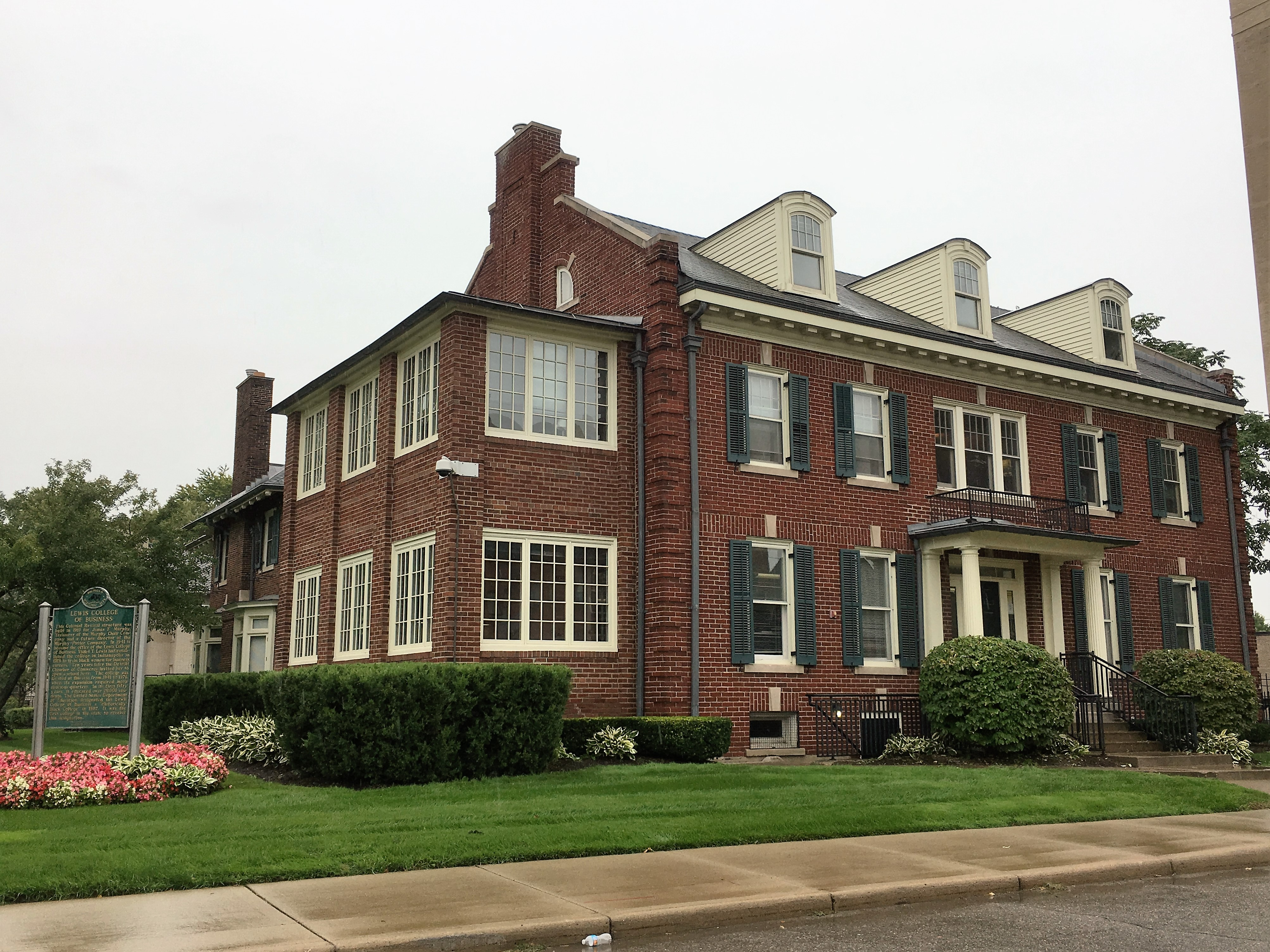
- The main building at 5450 John R Street
- Type: Private, HBCU
- Active: 1928–2015; 2021-present
- President: D'Wayne Edwards
- Students: 300
- Location: Detroit, Michigan, United States

Pensole Lewis College of Business and Design is a private, historically black college in Detroit, Michigan. It was also the first and only historically black college in Michigan. Founded in 1928 as the Lewis College of Business by Violet T. Lewis, it specialized in business-related topics.

The school originally closed in 2015 after losing its accreditation. However, the school became the first HBCU to reopen, rebranding as Pensole Lewis College of Business and Design in 2021 through the efforts of D'Wayne Edwards, founder of the Pensole Footwear Design Academy, with an emphasis on design in addition to business. The school is operating in a partnership with the College for Creative Studies while it works to obtain a new accreditation, campus, and legal & legislative approval to reopen.

The school was the founding location of the Gamma Phi Delta, Eta Phi Beta, and Tau Gamma Delta sororities.
