= Lubertha Johnson =

American nurse, community activist (1906–1996)

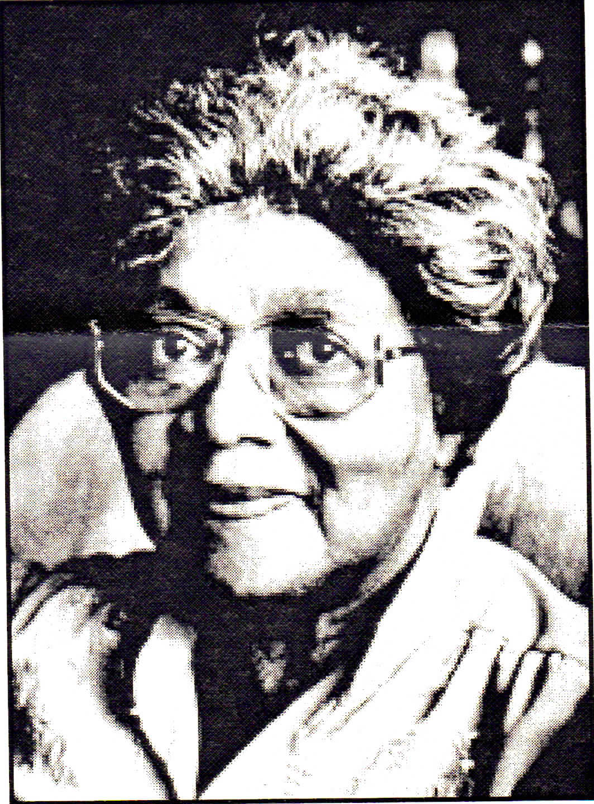
Lubertha Johnson. University of Nevada, Reno Oral History Project.

Lubertha Miller Johnson (July 22, 1906, Ackerman, Mississippi – January 6, 1996, Las, Vegas, Nevada) was an African-American nurse, civil rights campaigner and anti-poverty activist, based in Paradise Valley, Nevada. She was known as the first Black nurse in southern Nevada, and the president of the Las Vegas chapter of the NAACP.

She was a member of Gamma Phi Delta sorority. The annual Lubertha Johnson Award of the American Association of University Women is named in her honor.
