= World Center for Women's Archives =

Coordinates: 40.7483°N 73.9799°W

World Center for Women's Archives was an organization established by Rosika Schwimmer and Mary Ritter Beard in the hopes of creating an educational collection which women could consult to learn about the history of women. The center was located in the Biltmore Hotel at 41 Park Avenue in New York City. It closed in 1940, but the efforts made to establish a center to collect records encouraged several colleges and universities to begin developing similar archives of women's history. It was one of the earliest efforts to collect women's documents in the United States, predating the first accredited women's studies course in the U.S by 34 years, and preserved materials about women which otherwise might have been lost. It also redefined the way that historical documents were selected for archival inclusion. By changing what documents were noteworthy, using personal records to shape public history, the Women's Archive legacy was foundational to the development of feminist theory.

== Establishment ==
In 1935, Rosika Schwimmer, a pacifist suffragist, proposed to historian Mary Ritter Beard an idea to establish an archive to preserve the records of influential women. In Schwimmer's letter to Beard, she expressed her desire to create a repository for her personal archives, as well as leaders in the feminist and pacifist movements. Lamenting the lack of scholarship on women's history, she noted that while some noted women's records had been preserved, they were scattered, making it difficult to create an accurate or complete accounting of historic people and events. She also was concerned that the conservative environment which emerged in the interwar period would suppress gains made in the Progressive Era. Evaluating the state of feminism in the 1930s, Beard had concluded that greed and destructive tendencies had led to the Great Depression and that the equality sought by some feminists was merely "equality in disaster". She thought that women should focus on new ideas which would create a better society. She believed that a knowledge of the roles women had played throughout history could help women forge new leadership paths without imitating systems with subjugated them. Upon receipt of Schwimmer's letter, Beard immediately understood the educational value of such an archive, which would allow academics and other women to study women, rather than focusing solely on the achievements of men.

On September 17, 1935, Beard; Geline MacDonald Bowman, (Note: Relph and Grasso list her surname as Bow. The Dictionary of Virginia Biography, shows that her correct name was John-Geline MacDonald Bowman and newspapers confirm she commonly used Geline MacDonald Bowman.) president of the National Federation of Business and Professional Women's Clubs; Mary Jobson; Kathryn McHale, president of the American Association of University Women; and Lena Madesin Phillips, founder of the International Federation of Business and Professional Women, sent out a letter hoping to secure sponsors for the development of the archive and announced that a conference to discuss organization would be held the following month. The letter was sent to women such as Pearl S. Buck, Anne Morgan, Alice Paul, and Eleanor Roosevelt, including women from a variety of occupations as well as political viewpoints. The first meeting of the board was held in New York City on October 15, 1935, and early in 1936, the archive was incorporated with Inez Haynes Irwin as chair; banker Mina Bruere, as Treasurer; and Jane Norman Smith and Phillips on the Executive committee. In March 1936, Schwimmer, who had mainly worked in the background because of negative publicity surrounding her, resigned from the project for unspecified reasons.

== Operation ==
The goal of the organization was to establish branches in every state and represent women in all their diversity. Beard hoped that the archives would serve as a springboard for research on women and their history, though she recognized that a research-based center for women's studies would be a future expansion. To that end, she wrote to Ellen Sullivan Woodward, who instructed Works Progress Administration employees to search for records on women and Dorothy B. Porter, librarian and curator at Howard University, who agreed to compile African American records. Beard established the motto "No documents, no history", originally penned by French historian Numa Denis Fustel de Coulanges, for the archive. Beard was convinced that it only appeared that women were passive actors throughout history because there were no records showing that they had always been involved in defining civilization. She and supporters who created the Women's Archive aimed to integrate women and their achievements into the historical record, and remove the label of "mundane" or "insignificant" from the study of social history. Schwimmer and Beard also recognized that the process of selecting materials reinforced biases by suppressing some materials in favor of others or using political motivation to shape records retention. Beard specifically chose to involve as diverse a community of women as possible to collect records which might provide a complete history.

The archive headquarters was located in the Biltmore Hotel at 41 Park Avenue in New York City. The bylaws of the organization established that women contributing records be members of a local affiliated archive branch. Memos to women and published widely in the press reiterated that as libraries and archives had failed to preserve women's history, local groups should take charge of gathering their own records. Schwimmer had first described this problem, noting that Aletta Jacobs' collection had been untouched and unavailable to researchers since it was acquired by the John Crerar Library nearly three decades prior. The pleas for collection also reminded contributors that though women often preserved the memorabilia of male relatives, they often destroyed their own records and letters, which perpetuated the incomplete historical record. To encourage broad participation, they also used the innovative technique of sending out questionnaires, creating oral history narratives, and suggested that new technologies like "microfilm" be used to allow for broad reproduction and consultation of materials.

Initial efforts to raise funds resulted in women such as Irwin, Fannie Hurst, Georgia O'Keeffe, Alice Paul, and Eleanor Roosevelt sponsoring the archive, as well as other prominent women, like Frances Perkins, endorsing the project. Other supporters included Helen Astor, Dorothy Canfield Fisher, Margaret Sanger, and Ida Tarbell. On December 15, 1937, the opening gala was held and featured an exhibit including materials used by Amelia Earhart on her last flight. They later hosted events at the Library of Congress and the National Archives, as well as planning events for organizations like the Camp Fire Girls of America and lectures at universities throughout the country. In 1939, a gala event was hosted in Washington, D. C. by Roosevelt and the Archives featuring some of the papers of Nellie Tayloe Ross, 14th governor of Wyoming. Over 1,500 were in attendance to view the exhibition.

In 1938, Margaret Cuthbert, (Note: Relph incorrectly gives the first name of Cuthbert as Francis. A search of other sources, indicates that the pioneering radio woman was Margaret.) pioneer radio woman and head of the women's division at NBC Radio, pitched the idea that the Women's Archives could sponsor radio programs about women in history. Beard agreed to collaborate on the project believing it would bring more knowledge about women's diverse contributions to history, as long as the credits recognized the involvement of the Women's Archives. The two programs developed, Women in the Making of America and Gallant American Women ran weekly throughout 1939 and 1940. Journalist Eva vom Baur Hansl, a member of the Women's Archives and writer for such newspapers as The New York Times and New-York Tribune, developed the plotlines and then sent drafts to Beard and scriptwriter Jane Ashman for development. The team also consulted with J. Morrice Jones and Irve Tunick from the Office of Education and others like suffragist Carrie Chapman Catt; Eleanor Flexner, a woman's historian; and Eugenie Leonard, prior dean of women at Syracuse University.

== Dissolution ==
From the beginning because Beard wanted to include diverse viewpoints, some suffragists refused to donate their records. Those from more conservative branches of the movement, like the former National American Woman Suffrage Association (NAWSA), which had become the League of Women Voters, suspected ties between Beard and the National Woman's Party (NWP). Catt (NAWSA) refused to donate her papers, but Alice Stone Blackwell (NAWSA) reluctantly supported the effort by donating editions of Woman's Journal by her mother, Lucy Stone. Segregation also caused divides because black women like, Mary Bethune, Elizabeth Carter Brooks, Mary Church Terrell, and Sue Bailey Thurman were barred from joining the "whites-only" Washington, D. C. branch, in spite of the women having specifically been asked to assist in the project by Porter. Rather than tackle racism outright, Beard simply allowed African American women to submit documents directly to her. That policy brought concerns from other factions, like Miriam Y. Holden (NWP), a scholar and collector, who worked for social justice with the National Association for the Advancement of Colored People, who wanted a direct confrontation on the issue of racism. Coupled with financial issues, the discord and focus on other issues after the entry of the United States into World War II led Beard to resign in June 1940. The archives permanently closed in September because of the difficulties in raising charitable contributions not related to the war efforts.

== Legacy ==
The records the Women's Archives had accumulated were dispersed widely. Some were returned to their donors upon request, others were donated to various libraries, such as Columbia Teacher's College, Connecticut College, Hunter College, the New York Public Library, and Purdue University. Still others became the foundational documents for women's collections at Barnard College, Smith College's Sophia Smith Collection, and Radcliffe College's Schlesinger Library. Through the efforts to collect documentation, the Women's Archives inspired other individual and institutional efforts to preserve documents about women and their history, which might have disappeared without the collective initiative. It was one of the earliest attempts in the United States to gather women's archival records and predated the development of the first accredited women's studies program in the United States by 34 years. It not only established protocols that collecting women's archives were valuable in shaping the historical narrative, but laid the "foundations of the feminist historiographical paradigm" and more generally of other marginalized communities. By redefining what materials constituted historical documents, through the inclusion of personal letters, journals, and other memorabilia, the Women's Archives recognized the value of and impact that personal records and oral histories had on public history. That vision influenced how contemporary archives are compiled, as did the focus on having broad accessibility to encourage scholarship.

== See also ==
- International Archives for the Women's Movement
- National Archives for Black Women's History
