= Violet T. Lewis =

American businesswoman and educator (1897-1968)

- Born: Violet Temple Harrison; May 27, 1897; Lima, Ohio, U.S.
- Died: March 23, 1968 (aged 70); Detroit, Michigan, U.S.
- Education: Wilberforce University
- Occupations: Educator, businesswoman
- Known for: Founding Lewis College of Business and Gamma Phi Delta
- Spouse: Thomas Garfield Lewis (m. 1920; div. 1943)
- Children: 2

Violet T. Lewis (May 27, 1897 – March 23, 1968) was an American businesswoman and educator who founded the Lewis College of Business in 1928, the only historically black college in Michigan. She was also the co-founder of Gamma Phi Delta sorority.

== Early life ==
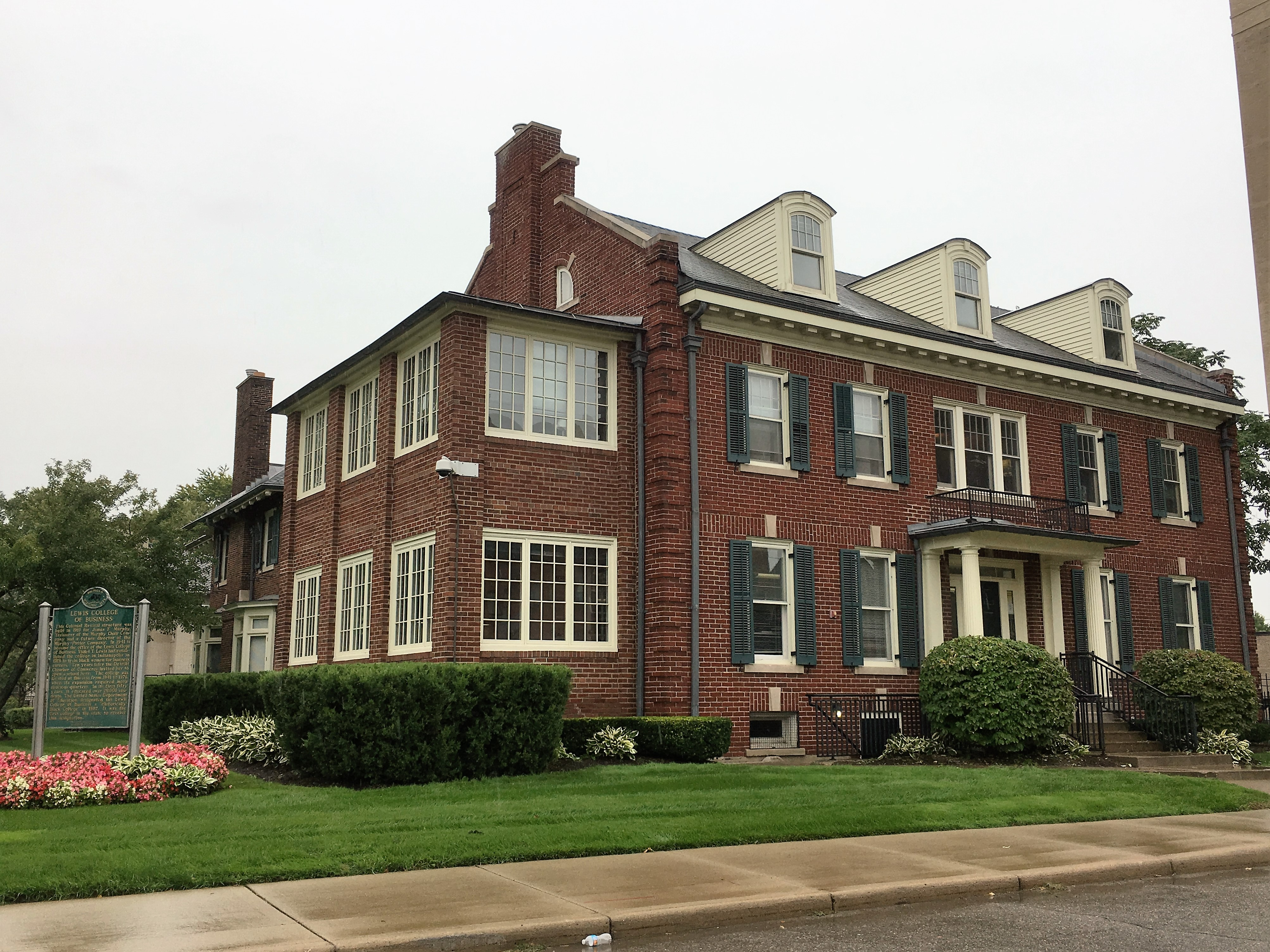
Lewis College of Business in Detroit, Michigan

Lewis was born Violet Temple Harrison on May 27, 1897, in Lima, Ohio. She was the second of the six children of William and Eva Harrison. She graduated from Lima High School in 1915. She attended Wilberforce University from 1915 to 1917.

== Career ==
Lewis' first job was as secretary to the president of Selma University in Alabama. She also taught secretarial classes in its business department. She later moved to Indianapolis, Indiana, where she worked as a bookkeeper.

After noticing a large number of young unemployed people, Lewis took a $50 loan and opened the Lewis Business College in 1928 in Indianapolis. Lewis started her own radio program, "The Negro Melody Hour", with a hope of boosting enrollment to the college. The program made her the first black radio announcer in Indiana.

Lewis owned multiple small businesses in Indianapolis, including an ice cream shop and a store selling Christmas trees and fireworks. She started an additional school in Detroit, Michigan in 1939, which opened the following February. Lewis eventually closed the Indiana college once the college's success in Detroit became apparent.

She later founded the Gamma Phi Delta sorority.

== Honors and awards ==
Lewis received a posthumous honorary doctorate from Wilberforce University. In 1992, she was inducted into the Michigan Women's Hall of Fame. In 2021, a portion of the M-10 highway in Detroit was named the Violet T. Lewis Memorial Highway.

== Personal life ==
She married Thomas Garfield Lewis in 1920 and had two children before their divorce in 1943. Lewis died on March 23, 1968, at the age of 70.
