= Hale Woodruff =

African American artist

Hale Aspacio Woodruff
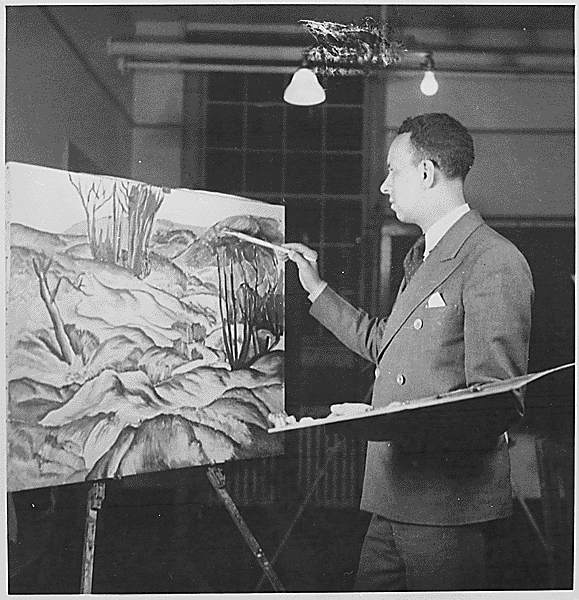
- Hale Woodruff in studio
- Born: August 26, 1900; Cairo, Illinois
- Died: September 6, 1980 (aged 80); New York, New York
- Known for: Painting, Murals
- Notable work: Amistad Mutiny murals (1938–1942)
- Spouse: Theresa Ada Baker

Hale Aspacio Woodruff (August 26, 1900 – September 6, 1980) was an African American artist known for his murals, paintings, and prints.

== Early life, family and education ==
Woodruff was born in Cairo, Illinois, on August 26, 1900. He grew up family in Nashville, Tennessee, where he attended the local segregated schools. He studied at the Herron School of Art and Design in Indianapolis, Art Institute of Chicago, and the Harvard Fogg Art Museum.

Woodruff won an award from the Harmon Foundation in 1926, which enabled him to spend four "crucial years studying in Paris from 1927–31." He studied at the Académie Scandinave and the Académie Moderne. He learned in the city's museums as well, while getting to know other expatriates, including Henry Ossawa Tanner, the leading African-American artist. Woodruff met leading figures of the French avant-garde and began collecting African art, which was a source of inspiration for many other modernists, including Pablo Picasso.

He returned to the U.S. in 1931 and married Theresa Ada Baker that year. They had one son, Roy.

== Art career ==
Woodruff reluctantly returned to the U.S. due to financial strains from the Great Depression. He worked as an art teacher to support himself. In 1931 he began teaching art at Atlanta University, a historically black college, eventually developing a department of which he was chair and the core of the university's art collection. He taught classes at the university's Laboratory High School, as well as for students at Morehouse and Spelman, a related college for black women. He founded the annual competition, Atlanta University Annual Exhibition of Paintings, Sculpture, and Prints by Negro Artists, which featured many African-American artists. This was conducted from 1942 to 1970.

In 1936 Woodruff went to Mexico to study as an apprentice under the famed muralist Diego Rivera, learning his fresco technique and becoming interested in portrayal of figures. He returned to Atlanta and continued teaching. He began traveling to Talladega College in Alabama to teach and work on a commission for a series of murals.

After his return to the United States in 1936, Woodruff applied his understanding of Post-Impressionism and Cubism to painting and printmaking for social advocacy. Woodruff was inspired by the racism and poverty African Americans in the South faced during the Great Depression.

Mutiny on the Amistad by Hale Woodruff, 1938

In the spring of 1938, Woodruff was commissioned to work on a series of murals for the lobby of the Savery Library at Talladega College in Alabama.

The first of these murals, which consisted of three panels on the west wall of the lobby, commemorates a revolt by Mende slaves which took place on the Spanish slave ship La Amistad. The first panel, entitled The Mutiny Aboard the Amistad, 1839, depicts the melee as the slaves seize control of the ship. The second panel, The Amistad Slaves on Trial at New Haven, Connecticut, 1840, shows the ensuing United Supreme Court Case, United States v. The Amistad. In the third panel, The Return to Africa, 1842, we see the former slaves' later repatriation to Mendiland.

The murals are an example of Woodruff's mastery of composition. For example, in the first panel:

The power of the combat is accentuated by the figure groups which give the composition its balance and visual stability. The circular motion of the bodies increases the drama of the struggle...The figures are designed in an overlay fashion so that they are seen as one complete unit moving from the left bringing the eye around to the escaping sailor, who reappears in the second panel as the accuser.

An image of the ship is embedded in a design in the lobby floor of the library. College tradition prohibits walking "on" the ship, despite its central location. The library has another series of three Woodruff murals exploring events related to the black college's role in African-American history, including freedmen enrolling after the American Civil War and the construction of campus buildings.

Woodruff painted two other surviving murals, though these were not frescoes but oil on canvas of monumental size. The Negro in California History--Settlement and Development (1949), was one of two panels commissioned by the Golden State Mutual Life Insurance Company in Los Angeles; the other panel was created by Charles Alston. Woodruff also completed six panels around 1950-1951 called Art of the Negro, now at the Clark Atlanta University Art Galleries.

In 1942, even with World War II raging, Woodruff initiated the Atlanta University Art Annuals, an exhibit and competition that was conducted until 1970. These 29 national art exhibitions were a key venue for black artists.

In 1946, Woodruff joined the faculty at New York University in Manhattan. He taught there for more than 20 years before retiring in 1968. Malkia Roberts was among his many New York students.

During the 1950s Woodruff had three solo exhibition at the Bertha Schaefer Gallery.

Woodruff died in New York City on September 6, 1980.

== Exhibition history ==
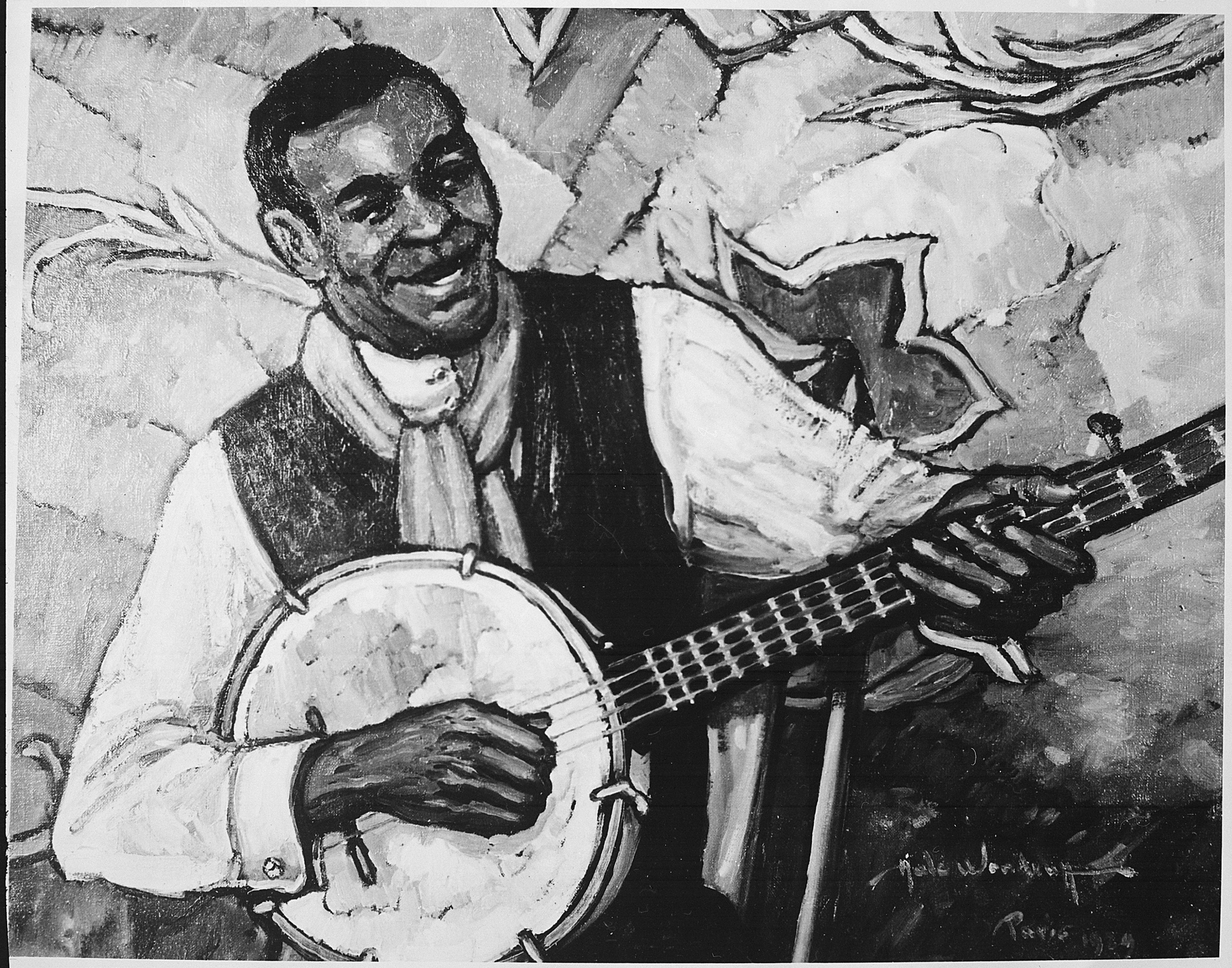
The Banjo Player was painted by Hale Woodruff in Paris in 1929. The original is now at the Virginia Museum of Fine Arts. The image has been called important, because it "reframes Black representation" shifting the viewer from the established Jim Crow image to an image put forth by an African American. Woodruff's painting counters "racist tropes", showing a Black musician playing with competence and dignity. While in Paris, Woodruff met Henry Ossawa Tanner, painter of The Banjo Lesson (another work which showed African Americans playing the banjo with dignity).

=== Solo exhibitions ===
1976

- Ancestral Memory

the Studio Museum in Harlem

=== Group exhibitions ===
1985

- Hidden Heritage, Bellevue Art Museum and Art Association of America

1976

- Two Centuries of Black Art, Los Angeles County Museum of Art

1971

- Newark Museum

1967

- New York University
- San Diego Art Museum
- Los Angeles County Museum of Art
- Museum of Fine Arts, Boston
- Howard University Gallery of Art, Washington, D.C.
- City College of New York

1958

- New Bertha Schaffer Gallery, New York

1955

- University of North Carolina

1951

- Atlanta University

== Legacy ==
In 2012 the High Museum of Art in Atlanta, Georgia organized an exhibition of Woodruff's murals created for Talladega College. The exhibition of six of the restored murals toured the United States including the African American Museum (Dallas), the Birmingham Museum of Art, the Chicago Cultural Center, the National Museum of African American History and Culture, the Nelson-Atkins Museum of Art, and the New Orleans Museum of Art.
