= Henry Bruère =

American public administrator, reformer & social reformer (1882-1958)

Henry J. Bruère
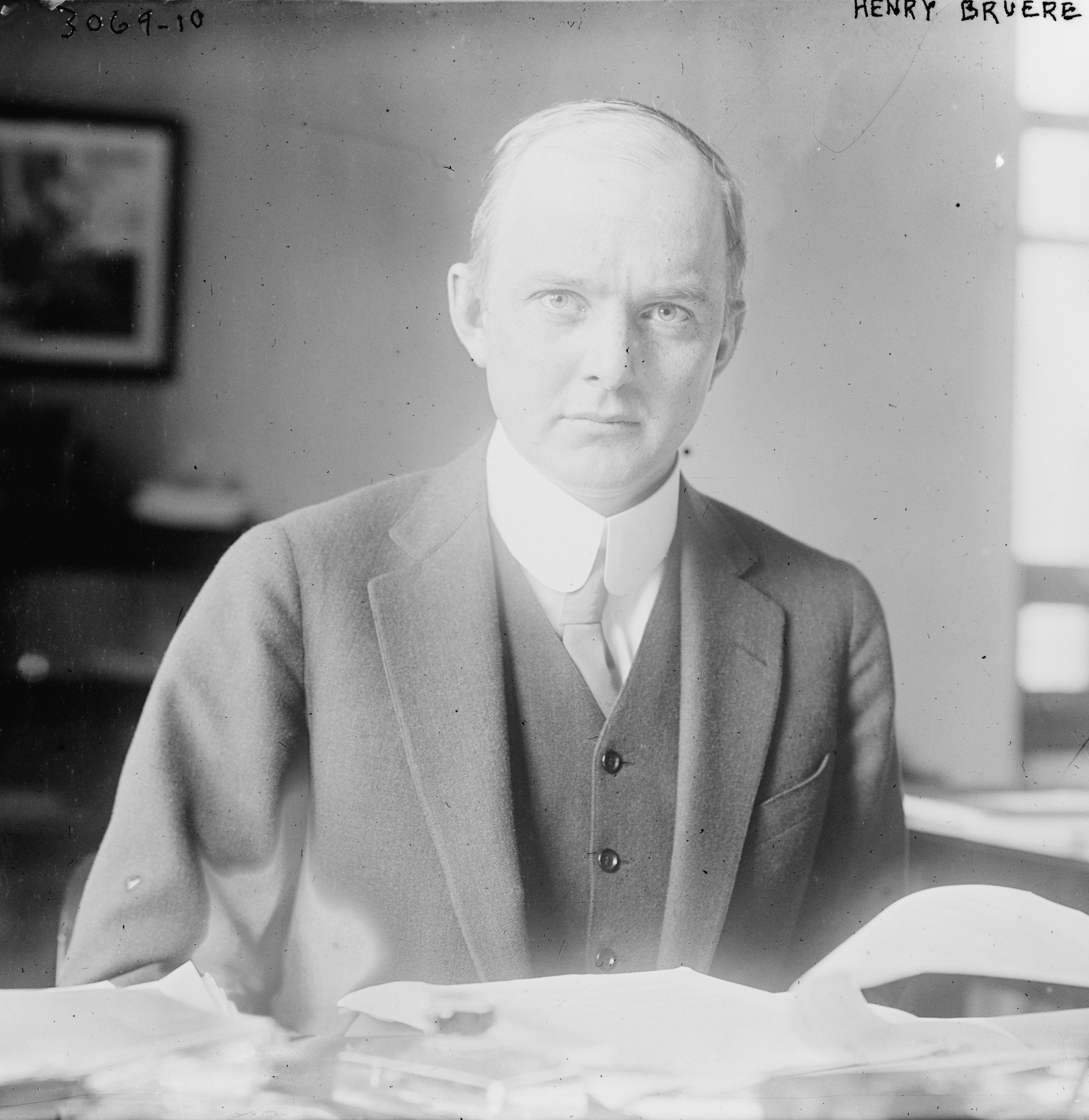
- Born: January 15, 1882; Saint Charles, Missouri
- Died: February 17, 1958 (aged 76); Winter Park, Florida
- Education: University of Chicago
- Known for: Progressive public administrator, reformer and social reformer
- Spouse: Jane Munroe
- Children: Richard Treat; Geoffrey Munroe; Alison Treat Carnahan; Honora Munroe McIver
- Parent(s): John Ernst Bruère; Cornelia Solomea Schoeneich
- Relatives: Mina Bruere (sister)

Henry Jaromir Bruère (January 15, 1882 – February 17, 1958) was a Progressive public administrator, reformer and social reformer known for his role as credit advisor to President Franklin D. Roosevelt during the banking liquidity crisis between 1930 and 1933 and recognition by New York City's press, 1913–1915, that he was a kingmaker, "the Warwick, the real Mayor of New York."

== Early life ==
Bruère was born to an older father. John Ernst Bruère (1836–1912), medical doctor, was forty-six (46) years old when Henry Bruère was born at Saint Charles, Missouri. John Ernest was of the second generation in an immigrant family, his father, Johann Bruère having immigrated from the lower Palatine in the German States. His mother was Wilhelmina Charlotte Jaeger. John Ernest was anti-slavery prior to the American Civil War, serving as Battalion Doctor in the Missouri State Militia during the hostilities. He was married on November 29, 1862, to Cornelia Solomea Schoeneich, daughter of Heinrich Shoeneich-Krasnadomsky and Maria Magdalena Ulrich. Both John Ernest (d. Nov. 23, 1912) and Cornelia (June 30, 1930) would relocate from Saint Charles, Missouri to New York City as Bruère rose to prominence. Henry's brother, Robert, was an investigative journalist focusing on labor federation competition in the United States.

== Progressive Social Work ==
Following graduation, Bruère found his heart in social work, volunteering during his brief stint at Harvard Law to aid the alienated at Boston's Boys' Club, Dennison House (Boston), and Highland Union. After graduate school, Bruère resided at College Settlement and then University Settlement, and then went on to become Personnel Director at Morgan's International Harvester Corporation. Once back East, Bruère focused on progressive causes such as municipal reform, labor rights, and gender equality.

After Harvester, Bruère removed to New York City, became president of the New York City Board of Social Welfare, and secretary to the Bureau of City Betterment. As an emerging cadre of reform-minded Progressive social workers came into contact with municipal officials, they began to note the misadministration that was occurring in many American municipalities. The Municipal Research Bureau that launched Bruère's New York career was financed by R. Fulton Cutting, chairman of the Citizens' Union. Bruère and his colleagues William H. Allen and Frederick A. Cleveland (collectively known as "the ABC" after the first letters of their last names) faced an uphill battle as they were systematically shut out of city offices, denied access to official information. The Bureau's first investigations focused on the commission for street cleaning and the handling of explosives with the city's limits. Successes in these areas of inquiry led to the first full scale review of a Borough, arranged with the borough President of Manhattan. The Bureau's studies covered jurisdictions throughout the northeastern United States, including the review of Chamber of Commerce fire prevention efforts in Rochester, New York. Bruère, in turn, used these studies in his writings. Bruère began his service as director of the Bureau of Municipal Research in 1907.

Henry Bruère had a sense of humor. As head of the Bureau of Municipal Research, Bruère received unusual access to the city's financial records. Department chairman complained about this level of transparency and lobbied the city's counsel to close the books to Bruère. As word leaked to the New York Press, City Comptroller Metz met with Bruère to placate concerns. The meeting allegedly ended with Metz kissing Bruère. At a press conference, Metz denied the kiss by an older man of a younger man; Bruère contradicted him in front of reporters and reported that he distinctly felt the latter's whiskers on his face.

== Service with New York City's Mitchel Administration ==
As director of the Bureau of Municipal Research, Bruère built a friendship with John Purroy Mitchel, the president of New York City's Alderman and future mayor of the city. The working relationship furthered reform in the city, and resulted in a White House summit on reorganization of District of Columbia with President Wilson in March 1913. In 1913, New York's Mayor John Purroy Mitchel appointed him Chamberlain of the City of New York in order to bring Progressive reform to a corruption-ridden municipal system. The proposed expansion of the Chamberlain's duties under the Mitchel administration was not budgeted. Henry Bruère found the funds to pay for the office's expansion by negotiating higher interest rates for City funds left on deposit at New York banks. During the City Hall reorganization of April 1914, Bruère's name was circulated for New York City's Commissioner of Police. Mayor Mitchel consulted with Henry Bruère and they agreed that the mayor's closest reform advisor needed to remain in the Chamberlain's position. As the Evening Post summarized the decision, "Bruère, as it has been repeatedly pointed out, is the most important of all the members of the Mayor's cabinet: he best represents the spirit of the new Administration. He is closest to the Mayor of all Mr. Mltchel's advisers . . . to appoint Bruère to succeed McKay would leave the City Chamberlain's office vacant and would remove from the Mayor's elbow the man he has considered his principal adviser, within three months after taking office. Remaining as Chamberlain, Bruère began a series of reforms that focused on a removal of redundant agencies and a centralization of activities allowing for an end to duplicate operations.

As Chamberlain of the City of New York, Bruère was also Vice President and Secretary of New York's Pension Commission. In this capacity, he reviewed the liabilities accruing to the system since the 1890s. Finding the growth of pension liabilities would require diversion of City funds from other missions. much of the report detailed pension abuses within the city's fire-fighting community including the Fire Chief's personal pension set at 150% of his pay upon retirement. Reforms called for including an ending of the nine-way division of funds and united administration of liabilities from a centralized body.

During the spring of 1915, New York press reports confirmed that Bruère was concerned about his lack of employment prospects should he stay through the entire Mitchel administration. Unlike his peers in the Mitchel administration, Bruère had neither a law practice nor a media company to which to return. He was without profession. When asked about the pending retirement, Bruère noted his closeness to the Mayor gave him a strong indication that reforms would continue. The newspaper reports also noted that Bruère had been the 'real Mayor' of New York for much of the Mitchel administration; had alienated powerful Borough presidents and was considered 'the Warwick' of New York City. His investigations also riled the Public Service Commission and the city's county governments. An attempt to change the Charter of New York and expand the Chamberlain's powers had failed just prior to Bruère's announced retirement.

== Career Bridging Public and Private Sector Finance ==
After leaving the Mitchel administration in 1916, Bruère served as vice president and efficiency expert at the American Metal Company, 61 Broadway. In that position, he prepared a plan for financing the federal expenditures necessary to field an army for the First World War. By the close of the war, Bruère was serving the federal government as national director for employment for New York City. The challenge at hand was the demobilization of the Army following the armistice and the predicted rise in unemployment that would follow. Bruère's interest in unemployment preceded demobilization and dated to his service as Chamberlain of the City of New York.

Soon after the Government of Mexico asked him to help reorganize its Department of Finance. While consulting for the Mexican government, Bruère studied taxation and currency challenges following the civil war. In the late 1920s and early 1930s, Bruère was a member of the Executive Committee and Board of the Welfare Council of New York City, leading the drive for government unemployment relief.

Later, Mr. Bruère was a Vice President of Metropolitan Life, and the CEO of the Bowery Savings Bank, which became his operating base from the late 1920s until the early 1950s, when he retired. "The Bowery" was a legendary New York institution, formed from the old knickerbocker Butchers' and Drovers' Bank in 1834. Six months before the Great Crash of October 1929, Henry Bruère – then president of Bowery Savings and Loan – used a speech before the Brooklyn Society for Ethical Culture to warn of the 'gambling' psychology then evident in stock market decisions. He saw the professionalism of New York's finance community as the best means of dampening such base developments.

== New Deal and after ==
Appointed by Frances Perkins as chairman of the New York State Committee on the Stabilization of Industry in 1930, Bruère worked on projects which presaged the National Recovery Administration's concept of government-led organization of industry. During the New Deal, Bruère also became a "Dollar-a-Year" Man for President Franklin Roosevelt by serving on the President's Federal Home Owners Loan Corporation and Federal Credit Association. He assisted with reforms implementing unemployment and old-age insurance systems and was an advisor to the Reconstruction Finance Corporation. Bruère also became executive assistant to William Woodin, Roosevelt's first Secretary of the Treasury. While at the White House, he was on the media communications team which proposed the "Fireside Chat" between the President and the American people, via a new medium called 'radio'. During the Second World War Bruère used his position as a Manhattan banker to coordinate relief committees for the people of France and Britain. Between 1951 and 1953, Henry Bruère was president, National Civic League, succeeding Charles Edison, son of Thomas Edison. George Gallup was elected president after Mr. Bruère. During the post-War period, Bruère returned to civic issues. As president of the Bowery Savings Bank, he worked to overcome the housing shortage in New York City and its boroughs. When Robert Moses' Brooklyn Civic Center and an adjacent Concord Village were approaching double the estimated cost, local leaders looked to Bruère to provide a solution.

== Family ==
The Bruere's eldest son, Richard Treat Bruere, went on to become a classicist, known for his specialized researching into the origins of the Metamorphoses by Ovid. Their Second son, Geoffrey Munro Bruere, became a market researcher for the railroad industry. In 1938, the Bruères announced the engagement of their daughter, Alison Treat Bruère, to Harvard-educated law student, George Carnahan, son of the International Rubber Company's president. Alison had made news at Vassar College the year before by protesting the presence of men in a theatre production by the Experimental Theater. Alison Bruère was the drama critic for The Vassar Miscellny, and went on to study law at Columbia.

Henry Bruère's more radical sibling, Robert W. Bruère, was an advisor to former President Theodore Roosevelt when the latter was forming his National Progressive Party leading up to the Bull Moose convention. Robert Bruere was a member of the Socialist Party for two years, 1909 and 1910, but became disenchanted with Marxism after he decided it was not suited to the American experience. Nonetheless, he did attend the infamous Barrows' dinner of 1934, which was alleged to be the beginnings of an American socialist revolution during the Great Depression. Robert Bruere was also an early proponent of vocational education. Also removing to New York City from Missouri was Henry's sister, Mina Bruère, a feminist and banking executive in her own right.

== Education ==
Bruère considered the practice of law and matriculated at a couple schools (including Harvard and New York University) before undertaking doctoral studies at Columbia University. He had been born at St. Charles, Missouri in 1882, and "came East" to study at Cornell University, where he rowed Freshman crew. He took his bachelor's degree in 1901 at the University of Chicago.

== Association ==
At Cornell University, Bruere joined the Phi Kappa Psi fraternity, and through that organization was a member of the Irving Literary Society, all before transferring to the University of Chicago to complete his undergraduate studies. Henry Bruere became fast friends with academic, reformer, and President of Columbia, Seth Low. His best friend was Paul C. Wilson, statistician and secretary to Mayor Mitchell. Paul Wilson's spouse, Frances Perkins, would go on to become the first woman to hold cabinet rank in the United States Government. She taught at Cornell's newly established School of Industrial and Labor Relations after her work with the Roosevelt Administration. Bruère also mentored a young journalist named Walter Lippman and an urban reformer named Robert Moses. Mr. Bruère was the "go between" linking labor and big business. He eventually became a director of Harriman's Union Pacific Railroad and Treasurer of Edward A. Filene's Twentieth-Century Fund. The retailer Filene mentored the rise of another friend and counselor, Louis D. Brandeis, to the U.S. Supreme Court. In 1934, Henry Bruère made the acquaintance of another young New York Alphan joining the Roosevelt Administration's Consumers' Advisory Board of the National Recovery Administration: Paul M. O'Leary.

Government offices
Preceded by Robert R. Moore	City Chamberlain of New York; January 1, 1914 – May 1, 1916	Succeeded by Milo R. Maltbie
Non-profit organization positions
Preceded by Charles A. Edison	President of the National Municipal League; January 1951 – November 1953	Succeeded by George H. Gallup
