= Rosa Slade Gragg =

American educator (1904–1989)

Rosa Slade Gragg, from a 1942 publication.

Dr. Rosa Slade Gragg (30 April 1904 – 19 February 1989) was an American activist and politician. She founded the first black vocational school in Detroit, Michigan; and was the advisor to three United States presidents. She was inducted in 1987 into the Michigan Women's Hall of Fame.

== Life and education ==
Gragg was born on April 30, 1904, in Hampton, Georgia, to Willis O. Slade and Sarah V. Haynes Slade, the oldest of seven children. Her father was a minister. She received her grade school education in Georgia, going on to Morris Brown College in Atlanta, Georgia, where she graduated summa cum laude. She went on to study at Tuskegee Institute (now Tuskegee University), the University of Michigan and Wayne State University. On June 10, 1926, she married Detroit businessman James Robert Gragg. They had one child named James R. Gragg Jr., who went on to become a lawyer and a judge in Michigan. Her husband died on December 16, 1956. She died on February 19, 1989, after a long illness.

== Career and activism ==
After graduating, Gragg became a teacher in Eatonton, Georgia. She later became principal of Eatonton High School; and later principal of Acworth High School. In the 1930s, Gragg became friends with Eleanor Roosevelt, and worked to improve racial relations. Around this time, Gragg became head of the English department at Central Park College in Savannah, Georgia. Gragg was good friends with Mary McLeod Bethune, who was the founder of the National Council of Negro Women. This friendship led Gragg to become an organizer and founder of organizations aimed at black women, organizing multiple programs around Detroit. Gragg started to become involved in clubs after joining the Current Topic Study Club in 1926. In 1941, Gragg bought a house in Detroit, which she used as a meeting place for clubs. Neighbors became angry at her purchase, and Gragg was forced to close off the front door and make the side door the main entrance for the house.

In 1942, Gragg was appointed by President Franklin D. Roosevelt to a national advisory board of the Federal Office of Civil Defense, entitled the Board of the National Volunteer's Participation Committee of Civil Defense. Gragg was the only black person to serve on the board at the time. In 1943, Michigan Governor Murray Van Wagoner appointed her the advisor on race relations to the Michigan Office of Civil Defense. In 1947, Gragg founded the Slade-Gragg Academy of Practical Arts with her husband. The school was the first black vocational school in Detroit. The school was called the "Tuskegee of the North" and trained over 2,000 women and veterans. It closed in 1952. The school was open to all people of all races. The school offered classes in trades, including tailoring, dress-making, and food production and service. In 1949, Detroit mayor Eugene Van Antwerp appointed Gragg as the president of the Commission of the Detroit Department of Public Welfare. She was the first black person named to be head of the committee. The commission had an operating budget of 20 million dollars and nearly 2,000 employees. During World War II, Gragg served as president of the Detroit Association of Colored Women's Clubs. This organization was incorporated into the National Association of Colored Women 20 years later. At its peak under her leadership in 1945, the club had 73 clubs as members and 3,000 members.

Gragg became the 16th president of the National Association of Colored Women in 1958, after becoming vice-president in 1957. Gragg was the president from 1958 to 1964, succeeding Irene McCoy Gaines. In 1960, she commissioned historian Charles H. Wesley to write the history of the National Association of Colored Women. The book was published in 1984, and entitled The History of the National Association of Colored Women's Clubs: A Legacy of Service. In 1960, Gragg was selected to be on the National Women's Advisory Committee of the Treasury Department by President John F. Kennedy. In 1961, Kennedy appointed her to the President's Commission On the Status of Women. Kennedy also appointed her to the National Women's Committee on Civil Rights and the Commission on Employment of the Handicapped.

In 1961, the National Association of Colored Woman worked toward preserving and restoring Frederick Douglass's home in Washington, D.C. Gragg launched the restoration campaign at a ceremony in Washington, D.C., where numerous politicians were in attendance. Also in attendance was Douglass's adopted grandson, Joseph K. Douglass. The club was successful in their pursuit, and in 1962 Senate Bill 2399 was passed in United States Congress. This bill designated the home a historic site. The bill was passed by President John F. Kennedy on September 5, 1962. Later that year, Gragg gave as a gift a portrait of Abraham Lincoln that had been in Frederick Douglass's library to the White House. The portrait hung in the Lincoln Room. This was the first time in United States history that a black organization gave a gift to the White House. Also in 1962, the club opened multiple women's health clinics in Washington, D.C. In 1964, she was unanimously elected president emeritus of the National Association of Colored Women. Also in 1964, President Lyndon B. Johnson appointed her to the National Citizens Committee for Community Relations, and the Defense Advisory Committee on Women in the Services.

Over her career, Gragg served on or was affiliated with many other positions, including: the Advisory Council of the International Movement of the Atlantic Union, the Gandhi Society for Human Rights, and as the secretary on the National Women's Committee on Civil Rights. She also served in numerous positions on matters related to the city of Detroit, including the Women's Committee for the 250th Anniversary of Detroit. Gragg was a member of: the National Association for the Advancement of Colored People, the March of Dimes United Foundation, The Association for the Study of Afro-American Life and History, and the sorority Sigma Gamma Rho.

== Honors and affiliations ==
In 1942, the magazine Crisis named her one of the "First Ladies of Colored America." In 1946, Gragg was included in the "Who's Who" of The Detroit News. In 1972, the city council of Detroit and the mayor of Detroit named a day for Gragg. In 1975, the Detroit Public Library's Tribute to Black America named her as one of the Black Detroit Leaders. In 1981, she was named a Distinguished Warrior by The Detroit News. The Morris Brown College alumni association named her Outstanding Graduate. The city of Philadelphia, Pennsylvania, awarded her the Richard Allen Award. She also received the March of Dimes Service Award.

Gragg received honorary doctoral degrees from Paul Quinn College in 1950, and in 1955. Gragg received honorary memberships to: the Detroit Urban League Guild, the sorority Lambda Kappa Nu, and the sorority Tau Gamma Delta.

== Further media ==
- An image of Gragg with Jacqueline Kennedy
