= Tau Gamma Delta =

African American service sorority

- ΤΓΔ
- Crest of Tau Gamma Delta
- Founded: 1942; 84 years ago Lewis Business College
- Type: Service
- Affiliation: Independent
- Status: Active
- Emphasis: African Americans
- Scope: National
- Colors: Light Pink and Light Blue
- Chapters: 16 active
- Headquarters: Detroit, Michigan; United States
- Website: www.taugammadeltasororityinc.com

Tau Gamma Delta is a national African American service sorority. It was established in 1942 in Detroit, Michigan, and has since established community-based and collegiate chapters across the United States.

== History ==
Tau Gamma Delta was established as a service club Phi Gamma Delta Sorority at the Lewis Business College in Detroit, Michigan in 1942. Its eight founders or Pearls were Clotiele Anderson, Corine Dean-Hubert, Jane Howard-Smith, Celillus Palmore-Morgan, Elizabeth Parker, Juanita Parnell, Agnes Sams-Fischer, and Kathleen Williams-Carter.

The sorority's name was changed to Tau Gamma Delta on October 17, 1951. Tau Gamma Delta Sorority Inc. was incorporated in the State of Michigan on December 12, 1951. The incorporated sorority's original purpose was to contribute to students ' business and academic training, promote high standards of personal conduct, support community, and civic activities, and "to add to the harmony and discipline and the general welfare of womanhood." Its members were African American professional and business women.

A second chapter, Beta, was established in Detroit Michigan, followed by Gamma in Indianapolis, Indiana. Tau Gamma Delta held its first national convention in 1945. Delta chapter was chartered in Chicago, Illinois in March 1954. At the time, the sorority also had eight affiliate chapters in Augusta, Georgia; Detroit, Michigan; New York City, New York; Pasadena, California; and Sacramento, California.

The sorority had 900 members across the United States in 1974. In March 1976, it had 27 chapters and more than 600 members. By 1979, it had chartered 39 chapters in fifteen states. By 1984, there were also chapters on some college campuses. It had ten collegiate chapters and 36 graduate or community-based chapters in March 1991.

As of 2024, the sorority has at least sixteen active chapters in the United States. Some of its records are preserved at the National Archives for Black Women's History. Tau Gamma Delta's headquarters is in Detroit, Michigan.

== Symbols ==
Tau Gamma Delta members are called "sorors". The sorority's colors are pale pink and pale blue. Its emblem was designed by Elza Neal.

== Activities ==
At its Boule, Tau Gamma Delta gives its Scholarship Award to a worthy student and presents its Charity Award to a nonprofit chosen by the host chapter. The Ballard Award is given to an outstanding member. In 2008, the sorority launched its Trunks for Success program at its national meeting. The program is based on the nonprofit Trunk Party Inc. of Chicago, Illinois which provides a trunk filled with essential supplies for college freshmen in need. Trunk Party was the recipient of the sorority's Charity Award in July 2008.

The national sorority also sponsored the Tautette Club, an organization for junior high and high school girls. The Tautlettes is a leadership club that also encourages college education and scholarships. Another national program is Taugadetta which provides scholarships for young artists. Tau Gamma Delta celebrates Founders Day each year in October.

True to its founders' purpose, the chapters of the service sorority continued to focus on education, raising funds for scholarships that are given to local students. Its members also volunteer at various organizations in their communities.

== Governance ==
Tau Gamma Delta conducts business and elects its national officers during its annual national meeting called a Boule. Its officers include the supreme basileus, supreme first anti-basileus, supreme second anti-basileus, supreme grammateus, supreme anti-grammateus, supreme epistaleus, supreme tamiochus, national graduate organizer, national keeper-of-pins, national Tauette director, national chaplain, and national historian.

In addition, it has regional directors for the Central, Eastern, Southern, and Western regions of the United States. Its chapter officers include supreme basileus, anti-basileus, secretary, recording secretary, treasurer, dean of pledges, parliamentarian, chaplain, and editor-in-chief.

== Chapters ==
In the following incomplete list, active chapters are indicated in bold and inactive chapters and institutions are in italics.

Chapter	Charter date and range	Institution	Location	Status	Ref.
Alpha	1942	Lewis Business College	Detroit, Michigan	Inactive	(Note: Chapter formed as Phi Gamma Delta Sorority. Its name was changed to Tau Gamma Delta in 1951.)
Beta			Detroit, Michigan	Active	
**Gamma**			Indianapolis, Indiana	Active	
Delta	March 1951		Chicago, Illinois	Inactive	
Epsilon			Sacramento, California	Inactive	
Zeta			Pasadina, California	Inactive	
**Eta**			New York City, New York	Active	
Theta	June 1956		Aiken, South Carolina	Inactive	
Iota	June 16, 1956		Cleveland, Ohio	Inactive	
**Kappa**			Augusta, Georgia	Active	
**Lambda**			Durham, North Carolina	Active	
Mu			Beverley Hill, California	Inactive	
Nu			Goldsboro, North Carolina	Inactive	
**Xi**	November 1956		Washington, D.C.	Active	
Omicron	July 1957		St. Albans, Queens, New York	Inactive	
**Pi**			Baltimore, Maryland	Active	
Rho (First)			Milledgeville, Georgia	Inactive	
**Rho**			Los Angeles, California	Active	
**Tau**			Philadelphia, Pennsylvania	Active	
**Chi**			Rocky Mount, North Carolina	Active	
**Psi**	March 22, 1969		Jersey City, New Jersey	Active	
Omega			Phoenix, Arizona	Inactive	
**Beta Omega**			Wilson, North Carolina	Active	
**Epsilon Omega**	March 1976		Greensboro, North Carolina	Active	
Theta Omega	July 8, 1978		Sumter, South Carolina	Inactive	(Note: Chapter formed from the Torchbearers' Pledge Club)
Lambda Omega			Bayonne, New Jersey	Inactive	
Mu Omega	March 17, 1979		Atlanta, Georgia	Inactive	
**XI Omega**			Richmond, Virginia	Active	
**Upsilon Omega**	November 23, 2023		Phenix City, Alabama	Active	
		North Carolina Central University	Durham, North Carolilna	Inactive	
		Wayne State University	Detroit, Michigan	Inactive	
			Houston, Texas	Active	
			Indiana	Active	
			Michigan	Active	
			Sacramento, California	Inactive	

== Notable members ==
- Rosa Slade Gragg (Honorary), founder of the first Black vocational school in Detroit, Michigan

== See also ==
- Cultural interest fraternities and sororities
- List of African-American fraternities and sororities
- List of social sororities and women's fraternities
- Service fraternities and sororities
