= Martha Bensley Bruère =

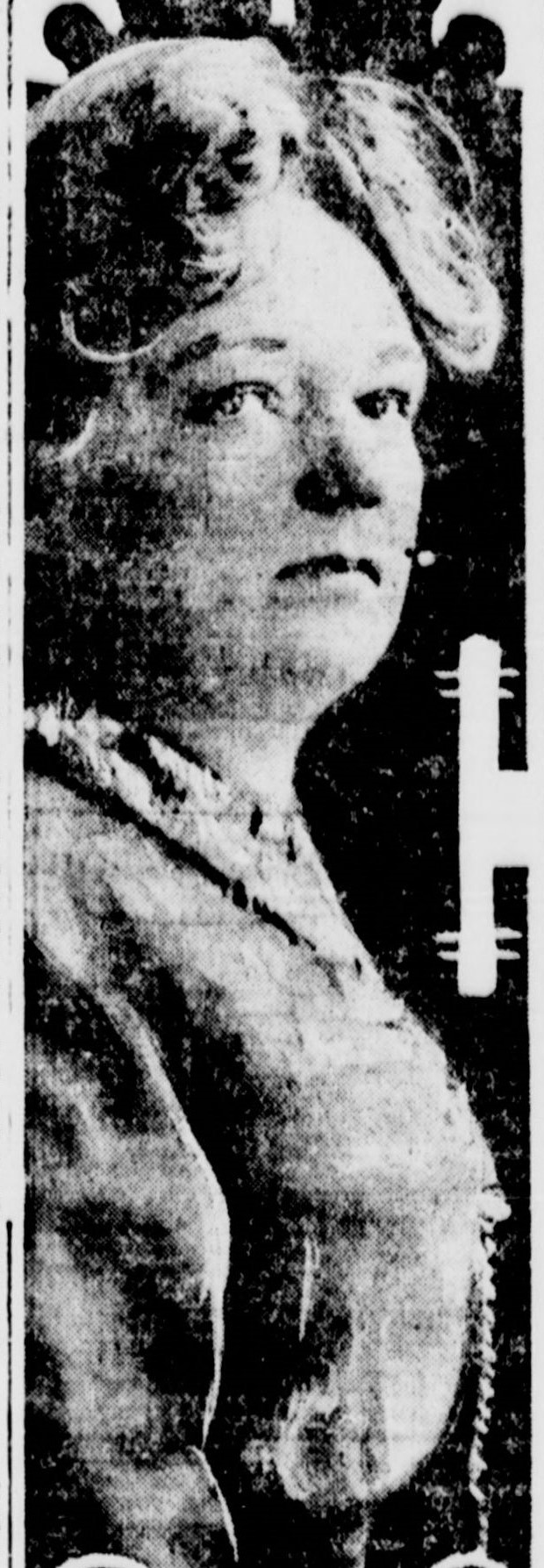
- Born: 1879; Chicago
- Died: August 10, 1953 (aged 73–74); New York City
- Occupation: Writer

Martha S. Bensley Bruère (1879 – 10 August 1953) was an American writer, painter, and reformer. She was the author of the utopian novel Mildred Carver, U.S.A. (1919).

Martha Bensley was born in 1879 in Chicago, the daughter of John Russell Bensley and Augusta Fuller Bensley. Bensley graduated from Vassar College in 1893 and attended the University of Chicago and the Art Institute of Chicago. She studied painting under Emily Chase, Frank Duveneck, Lemuel Maynard Wiles, and William Brantley van Ingen and worked as a portrait painter in Chicago from 1895 to 1903.

She married Robert Walter Bruère, an author and industrial relations expert, in 1907. Reportedly they met when articles they submitted to the same publisher were returned to them with their addresses switched, which lead to a correspondence between them. The couple collaborated on the book Increasing Home Efficiency (1912), which advocated the then-bold theory that people of both genders should engage in domestic labor. The Bruères were associate editors of the social issues journal Survey from 1919 to 1947.

Martha Bruère was active with the Women's Trade Union League and wrote articles for their journal Life and Labor. Among her subjects were Frances Kellor, the 1913 White Goods Strike, and the Triangle Shirtwaist fire. The latter has been called "one of the most comprehensive overviews of the Triangle strike and fire."

Her novel Mildred Carver, U.S.A. was published in 1919 and serialized in Ladies' Home Journal from June 1918 to February 1919. It was one of a number of utopian novels published following Edward Bellamy's Looking Backward (1888). The title character is an upper-class woman who performs her year of Universal Service doing agricultural work on a farm in Minnesota.

In 1927, Bruère headed a study for the National Federation of Settlements called Does Prohibition Work? The study concluded that prohibition improved overall conditions for lower-income Americans.

Bruère and Mary Ritter Beard published the anthology Laughing Their Way: Women's Humor in America (1934), with Bruère contributing cartoons to the volume. Bruère wrote several publications for the United States Forest Service, including Here Are Forests: Their Relation to Human Progress in the Age of Power (1936), Taming Our Forests (1938), and What Forests Give (1943), as well as a book of her own on the topic, Your Forests (1945), with an introduction by Gifford Pinchot.

Martha Bensley Bruère died of a heart attack on 10 August 1953 in New York City.
