= Bettye Collier-Thomas =

American historian

- Born: Bettye Marie Collier; February 18, 1941 (age 85)

Academic background
- Education: Allen University; Clark Atlanta University; George Washington University

Academic work
- Discipline: American history

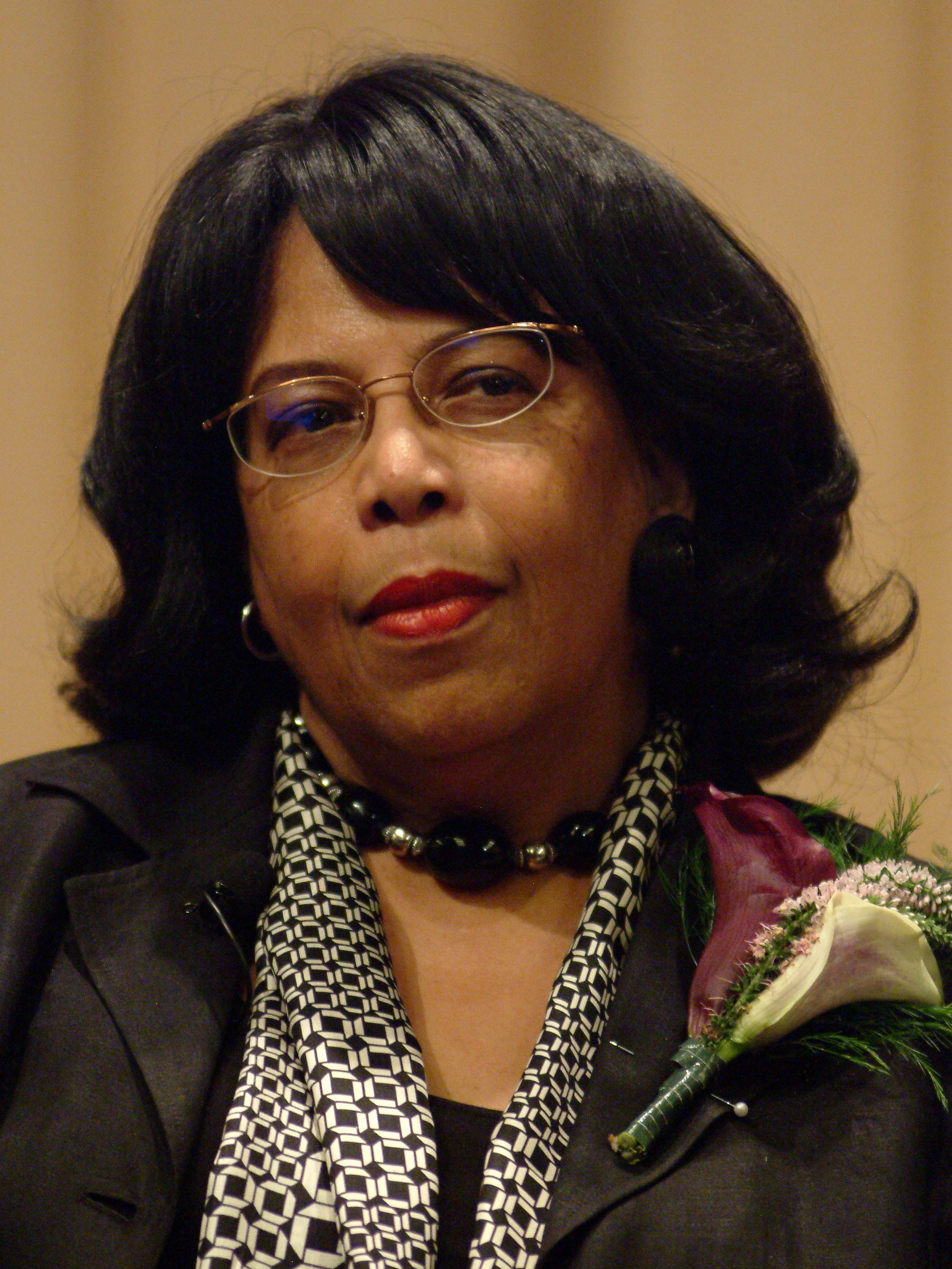
Collier-Thomas in 2009

Bettye Collier-Thomas (born Bettye Marie Collier, February 18, 1941) is a scholar of African-American women's history.

== Early life and education ==
Collier-Thomas was born the second of three children of Joseph Thomas Collier, a business executive and public school teacher, and Katherine (Bishop) Collier, a public school teacher. She attended elementary schools in New York, Georgia, and Florida, and high school in Jamaica, New York. Her family belonged to the black middle class, with professions such as nurse, building subcontractor, and barber represented among her near relatives as well as teacher and businessman. Her great-uncle Frank Richard Veal was an African Methodist Episcopal minister and president of the historically black Allen University (South Carolina) and Paul Quinn College (Texas). She thought that she would go into law, but an 11th grade teacher inspired her to become an historian instead. She hyphenated her name upon marriage to Charles J. Thomas, an educator (deceased) and writer.

Collier-Thomas was awarded bachelor's degree at Allen University, where she was inducted into the Alpha Kappa Mu National Honor Society (the black Phi Beta Kappa during segregation). She won a Presidential Scholarship to attend Atlanta University, where she received the master's degree. In 1974, supported by a Ford Foundation Fellowship, she became the first black woman to receive a Ph.D. in history from George Washington University.

== Career ==
Between 1966 and 1976, Collier-Thomas held various positions in academia, including serving as a professor and administrator at Howard University and holding faculty positions at Washington Technical Institute and the University of Maryland, Baltimore County. In 1977, she was hired as a special consultant to the National Endowment for the Humanities, for which she developed the NEH's first program of technical assistance to black museums and historical organizations. That same year, she became the founding executive director of the Mary McLeod Bethune Memorial Museum and National Archives for Black Women's History (BMA) in Washington, D.C., which was headquartered in a former private house. In 1982, the BMA was designated a National Historic Site and its name changed to the Mary McLeod Bethune Council House National Historic Site. As an "Affiliate Unit of the National Park Service" it received a small annual stipend, however BMA was forced to raise its own funding to support several positions, programming and exhibitions. Grants and funding from NEH and NEA, the Ford and Rockefeller foundations, Lilly Endowment, Washington, DC Humanities, and small donations from General Electric, local banks and individuals contributed to the institutions growth and success.

In 1995 the US Congress Today, under the direction of the National Park Service the institution has been converted to a house museum focused upon the life and history of Mary McLeod Bethune and the National Archives for Black Women's History has been moved to . It opened to the public in 1981, and under Dr. Collier-Thomas's direction, it became a nationally prominent institution focused upon the history of African American women. It was celebrated for its changing exhibitions and numerous programs showcasing black women as educators, social and political activists, artists, musicians and numerous topics.

In 1994, Collier-Thomas was awarded the Department of the Interior's Conservation Service Award in recognition of her leading role in creating and developing BMA. In giving the award, then–Interior Secretary Bruce Babbitt wrote:

"Dr. Collier-Thomas has established the only repository in the country solely devoted to the collection and preservation of materials relating to African-American women in America. Other repositories may collect materials on black history or on women's history, but no other repository gives black women their principal attention."

Collier-Thomas left BMA in 1989 to accept a joint appointment at Temple University as an associate professor in the Department of History and the inaugural director of the Temple University Center for African American History and Culture (CAAHC), a position she held for eleven years. In 1997 she was promoted to full-professor in the History Department. She is also a distinguished lecturer for the Organization of American Historians and a public policy Fellow at the Woodrow Wilson Center.

As a scholar, Collier-Thomas specializes in the social and political history of African-American women and has written on topics such as black theater, religion, and women's organizations. She argues that too many historians write as if race is the only locus of discrimination for African-Americans. In her view, African-American women suffer from being framed simultaneously by race, class, and gender—a kind of "oppression-in-triplicate". This experience, in turn, provides them with a strong ground from which to speak truth.

Collier-Thomas's book Jesus, Jobs and Justice (2010) examines the ways in which both black and white Protestant women dealt with racial issues in the first half of the 20th century, prefiguring the emergence of the Civil Rights Movement. Her Daughters of Thunder (1998) is an anthology of 19th and 20th century sermons by black women, selected from a collection amassed by Collier-Thomas over the course of two decades. Such sermons by women were rarely collected or recorded, making this anthology especially useful as source material for other scholars.

== Selected publications ==
=== Author ===
- Jesus, Jobs and Justice: African American Women and Religion. Random House, 2010.
- "John Hope Franklin: Mentor and Confidante." Journal of African American History 94.3 (2009): 344–353.
- Daughters of Thunder: Black Women Preachers and Their Sermons, 1850-1979. Jossey-Bass, 1998.
- African American Women and the Vote, 1837-1965. Co-edited with Ann Dexter Gordon. Univ of Massachusetts Press, 1997.
- "Towards Black Feminism: The Creation of the Bethune Museum-Archives." Special Collections 3.3-4 (1985): 43–66.
- "The Impact of Black Women in Education: An Historical Overview," Journal of Negro Education 51 (Summer 1982)

=== Co-author and co-editor ===
- Franklin, V. P., and Bettye Collier-Thomas. "Biography, Race Vindication, and African American Intellectuals." The Journal of African American History (2002): 160–174.
- Collier-Thomas, Bettye, and Vincent P. Franklin, eds. Sisters in the Struggle: African American Women in the Civil Rights-Black Power Movement. New York University Press, 2001.
- Collier-Thomas, Bettye, and Vincent P. Franklin.My Soul is a Witness: A Chronology of the Civil Rights Era in the United States, 1954-1965. Henry Holt, 2000.
- Collier-Thomas, Bettye, and James Turner. "Race, Class and Color: The African American Discourse on Identity." Journal of American Ethnic History (1994): 5-31.
