= Mary McLeod Bethune Council House National Historic Site =

National Historic Site of the United States

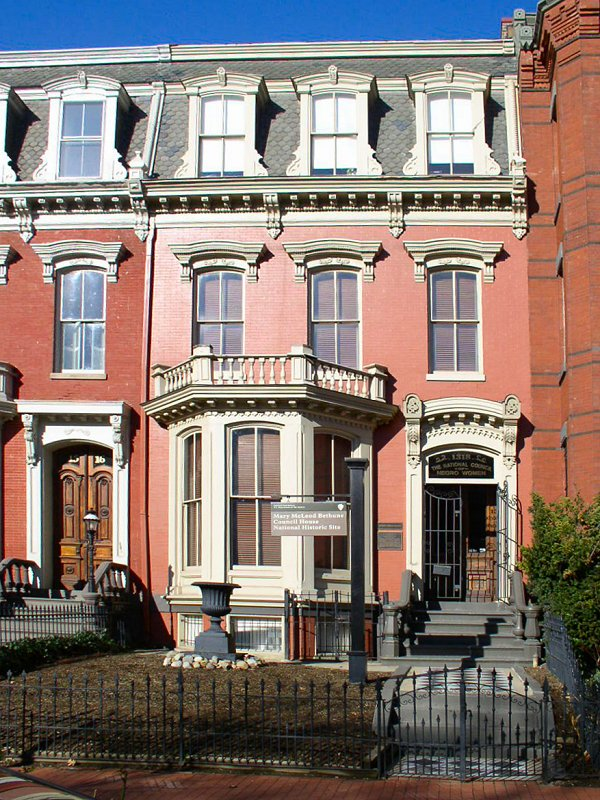
- Mary McLeod Bethune Council House

- Location within Central Washington, D.C. Location within the District of Columbia Location within the United States
- Location: 1318 Vermont Avenue, NW; Washington D.C., United States
- Coordinates: 38°54′29″N 77°01′51″W
- Area: 0.07 acres (0.028 ha)
- Established: October 15, 1982
- Visitors: 3,123 (in 2025)
- Governing body: National Park Service
- Website: Mary McLeod Bethune Council House National Historic Site

The Mary McLeod Bethune Council House National Historic Site preserves the house of Mary McLeod Bethune, located in Northwest Washington, D.C., at 1318 Vermont Avenue NW. National Park Service rangers offer tours of the home, and a video about Bethune's life is shown. It is part of the Logan Circle Historic District.

The house is about five blocks north-northeast of the McPherson Square Washington Metro on the Blue and Orange Lines, and about five blocks south of the U Street Metro station on the Green Line. It is a half block southwest of Logan Circle.

== About the site ==
The site consists of a three-story Victorian townhouse and a two-story carriage house. The carriage house contained the National Archives for Black Women's History, until 2014, when the National Park Service relocated the records to the National Park Service Museum Resource Center in Landover, Maryland. The archives and a research center at the property are open only by appointment.

Bethune made her home in the townhouse from 1943 to 1955. She purchased it for $15,500. Bethune lived on the third floor, while the National Council of Negro Women occupied the first and second floors. The floor plan of the home remains unchanged from the days when Bethune lived there, and most of the furnishings are original to the home and owned by Bethune and the NCNW.

== Legacy at the Council House ==
In 1958, the National Council of Negro Women (NCNW), headquartered in the Council House, launched a campaign to create a permanent memorial to Bethune in Washington, D.C. This initiative reflected Bethune’s enduring legacy, which included founding the NCNW, the largest Black women’s organization in the United States as well as Bethune-Cookman University, which she started as a one-room school with only $1.50. The Council House also preserved important archives documenting Black women’s history, maintained by both the NCNW and the Bethune Foundation. These efforts made the site not only a strategic base for national advocacy but also a lasting symbol of African American women’s leadership and historical preservation.

== Becoming a National Historic Site ==
After Bethune's death, title to the house passed to the National Council of Negro Women, who continued to use it as a headquarters. The Council of the District of Columbia added the site to the D.C. Register of Historic Places in 1975, and began a major restoration of the home, carriage house, and grounds. Archivist and historian Bettye Collier-Thomas was hired to manage the house, which the NCNW and the city hoped to turn into a research archive and museum. Collier-Thomas turned the museum into a nationally prominent one. After a $150,000 restoration, it opened to the public as a historic house museum in 1981. The American Institute of Architects awarded the facade and first floor restoration effort a historic preservation citation of merit.

The structure was proposed as a National Historic Site the same year, but the National Park Service controversially refused to conduct a study that would make this determination. In 1982, Congress passed legislation requiring the United States Department of the Interior to sign an agreement with the National Council of Negro Women to further restore the house and carriage house, and to establish and maintain a museum and archives in the structure. Although the NCNW would retain ownership of the house, it would "affiliate" with the National Park Service. The museum and archives were established. Another $1 million in federal money was spent refurbishing, renovating, and conserving the house. By 1987, the federal government was paying $300,000 a year to maintain the house and museum, with the remaining two-thirds of the museum's budget coming from corporations, foundations, and private citizens. Collier-Thomas left the museum in 1989.

The National Park Service purchased Council House in 1994 and renamed it the Mary McLeod Bethune Council House National Historic Site. The National Council of Negro Women purchased as its new headquarters Sears House—an $8 million, six-story, 42,000-square-foot (3,900 m^{2}) historic building at 633 Pennsylvania Avenue NW. The Council House was transferred to the Park Service in October 1996.
