= Eta Phi Beta =

African American business sorority

- ΗΦΒ
- Founded: October 1942; 84 years ago Lewis Business College
- Type: Professional
- Affiliation: Coalition of Black Business Sororities
- Status: Active
- Emphasis: Business, African-American
- Scope: National
- Motto: "Not For Ourselves, But For Others"
- Colors: Crimson, Gold and Black
- Philanthropy: NAACP, UNCF
- Chapters: 91
- Members: 5,000 lifetime
- Nickname: Bee-Ettes, Senords, Eta Kids
- Headquarters: 19983 Livernois Avenue, Suite B Detroit, Michigan 48221; United States
- Website: etaphibetasorority.com

Eta Phi Beta (ΗΦΒ) is an African American business sorority located in the United States. It was founded in Detroit, Michigan at the historically black Lewis Business College in October 1942. In 1997, the organization had 91 chapters and over 5,000 members internationally.

== History ==
Eta Phi Beta was established by students at the historically black Lewis Business College in Detroit, Michigan in October 1942. Eta Phi Beta was founded to foster women to enter into the world of business. Its founders were Ivy Burt Banks, Dorothy Sylvers Brown, Earline Carter, Mae Edwards Curry, Katherine Douglas, Atheline Shelton Graham, Merry Green Hubbard, Ethel Madison, Ann Porter, Mattie Rankin, and Lena Reed.

The sorority was incorporated in 1943. Additional chapters were chartered at schools such as St. Augustine's University as well as the city of Indianapolis. In 1977, the Michigan state House of Representatives approved a resolution making May 14, 1977 the Eta Phi Beta Sorority Day.

The sorority had over 80 chapters nationwide in 2002. On June 13, 2009, the 81st Texas Legislature House of Representatives honored Eta Phi Beta Sorority, Inc. to commemorate its 2009 Founders Day. Another resolution was made in the state of Georgia.

Eta Phi Beta is an affiliate member of the National Council of Negro Women. It is also a member of the Coalition of Black Business Sororities, which also includes Gamma Phi Delta, Iota Phi Lambda, and Lambda Kappa Mu.

== Symbols ==
The sorority's colors are crimson, gold, and black. Its motto is "Not For Ourselves, But For Others."

== Activities ==
Chapters meet monthly from September to June. The sorority hosts its national convention, The Grand Boule', biennially on even-numbered years. Regional conferences are held biennially on odd-numbered years.

Eta Phi Beta funds various charitable organizations including the March of Dimes, the NAACP, and the United Negro College Fund. Its main national charitable project is services for citizens with intellectual and developmental disabilities. The biennial Gloria Chapman Walk-a-thon raises funds for community-based organizations that work in this area. Nationally, the sorority also supports breast cancer awareness and domestic violence prevention.

Chapters, regions, and the Grand chapter all award annual scholarships for high school graduates and college students. Chapters also support programs and provide tutoring to teach young children life skills, reading, mathematics literary, and social etiquette. Some chapters host an annual Cotillion Ball that introduces children into society.

Established in 1949, the National Council of Shads is an auxiliary organization of Eta Phi Beta, consisting of the husbands of sorority members. It provides conducts community service projects and provides scholarships.

== Membership ==
Membership is open to women who are college graduates or have completed at least two years of college; potential members may apply to join or are invited to join by members of the sorority. Eta Phi Beta has a 3-month initiation process. There are two also Youth Groups, Gamma and Lambda chapters, for children ages six to eleven.

== Chapters ==
Following is a list of Eta Phi Beta chapters. Most chapters are community-based. There are two Youth Chapters, Gamma and Lambda, which are for children ages six to eleven. The Beta series chapters were chartered at colleges and universities but have all gone inactive. Active chapters are indicated in bold. Inactive chapters are in italics.

Chapter	Charter date and range	Institution	Location	Region	Status	Ref.
**Alpha**	October 1942		Detroit, Michigan	Northern	Active	
Beta			Battle Creek, Michigan	Northern	Inactive	
**Gamma**			Cleveland, Ohio	Northern	Active	(Note: This is a Youth Chapter, serving children aged 6 to 11.)
**Delta**			West Palm Beach, Florida	Southeastern	Active	
**Epsilon**	June 28, 1958		Dallas, Texas	Southern	Active	
Zeta			Columbus, Ohio	Northern	Inactive	
**Eta**			Fort Worth, Texas	Southern	Active	
Theta			Ecorse, Michigan	Northern	Inactive	
**Iota**			Fort Lauderdale, Florida	Southeastern	Active	
**Kappa**			Los Angeles, California	Western	Active	
**Lambda**			Dayton, Ohio	Northern	Active	
Mu			Shaker Heights, Ohio	Northern	Inactive	
**Nu**			Jacksonville, Florida	Southeastern	Active	
**Xi**	April 28, 1962		Houston, Texas	Southern	Active	
**Omicron**			New Orleans, Louisiana	Southern	Active	
Pi			Maywood, Illinois	Northern	Inactive	
Rho			Tulsa, Oklahoma	Southern	Inactive	
**Grand**			Detroit, Michigan	Northern	Active	
**Tau**	June 5, 1965		Oklahoma City, Oklahoma	Southern	Active	
Upsilon			Pasadena, California	Western	Inactive	
Phi			Wichita, Kansas	Southern	Inactive	
Chi			New York, New York	Eastern	Inactive	
Psi			Newark, New Jersey	Eastern	Inactive	
Alpha Alpha			Seattle, Washington	Western	Inactive	
Alpha Beta			Oakland, California	Western	Inactive	
**Alpha Gamma**	April 8, 1967		Miami, Florida	Southeastern	Active	
**Alpha Delta**			Richmond, Virginia	Eastern	Active	
Alpha Epsilon First			Sheffield, Alabama	Southeastern	Inactive	
**Alpha Epsilon**			Raleigh, North Carolina	Mid-Eastern	Active	
**Alpha Zeta**			Washington, D.C.	Eastern	Active	
Alpha Eta			Goldsboro, North Carolina	Mid-Eastern	Inactive	
**Alpha Theta**			Durham, North Carolina	Mid-Eastern	Active	
**Alpha Iota**			Gainesville, Florida	Southeastern	Active	
Alpha Kappa			Williamson, West Virginia	Mid-Eastern	Inactive	
**Alpha Lambda**			Chicago, Illinois	Northern	Active	
Alpha Mu			St. Louis, Missouri	Southern	Inactive	
Alpha Nu			Atlantic City, New Jersey	Eastern	Inactive	
Alpha Xi			Indianapolis, Indiana	Northern	Inactive	
**Alpha Omicron**			Delray Beach, Florida	Southeastern	Active	
**Alpha Pi**			Milwaukee, Wisconsin	Northern	Active	
**Alpha Rho**	1973		Greensboro, North Carolina	Mid-Eastern	Active	
Alpha Sigma			Wilmington, North Carolina	Mid-Eastern	Inactive	
Alpha Tau			Willingboro, New Jersey	Eastern	Inactive	
Alpha Upsilon					Unassigned ?	
Alpha Phi			Albuquerque, New Mexico	Western	Inactive	
**Alpha Chi**			Saint Thomas, U.S. Virgin Islands	Southeastern	Active	
**Alpha Psi**			Carson, California	Western	Active	
**Alpha Omega**			Huntsville, Alabama	Southeastern	Active	
Beta Alpha		Virginia Union University	Richmond, Virginia	Eastern	Inactive	
Beta Beta		Virginia State University	Ettrick, Virginia	Eastern	Inactive	
Beta Gamma		San Jose State University	San Jose, California	Western	Inactive	
Beta Delta		St. Augustine's University	Raleigh, North Carolina	Mid-Eastern	Inactive	
Beta Eta		Central State University	Wilberforce, Ohio	Northern	Inactive	
Beta Zeta		Florida Memorial College	Miami, Florida	Southeastern	Inactive	
Beta Epsilon		University of Southern California	Los Angeles, California	Western	Inactive	
Gamma Alpha			Lake Elsinore, California	Western	Inactive	
Gamma Beta			Nashville, Tennessee	Mid-Eastern	Inactive	
Gamma Gamma			Asbury Park, New Jersey	Eastern	Inactive	
Gamma Delta			Fayetteville, Alabama	Southeastern	Inactive	
**Gamma Epsilon**			Tuscaloosa, Alabama	Southeastern	Active	
Gamma Zeta			Saint Croix, U.S. Virgin Islands	Southeastern	Inactive	
Gamma Eta			Racine, Wisconsin	Northern	Inactive	
Gamma Theta			Atlanta, Georgia	Southeastern	Inactive	
**Gamma Iota**			Greenville, Mississippi	Southeastern	Active	
Gamma Kappa			Baton Rouge, Louisiana	Southern	Inactive	
Gamma Lambda			Sedalia, North Carolina	Mid-Eastern	Inactive	
**Gamma Mu**			Reform, Alabama	Southeastern	Active	
**Gamma Nu**			Little Rock, Arkansas	Southern	Active	
Gamma Xi			Whiteville, North Carolina	Mid-Eastern	Inactive	
Gamma Pi			Birmingham, Alabama	Southeastern	Inactive	
Gamma Omicron			Ramseur, North Carolina	Mid-Eastern	Inactive	
**Gamma Rho**			Homestead, Florida	Southeastern	Active	
Gamma Sigma			Oxford, North Carolina	Mid-Eastern	Inactive	
Gamma Tau			Lima, Ohio	Northern	Inactive	
Gamma Upsilon			Burlington, North Carolina	Mid-Eastern	Inactive	
Gamma Phi			Bronx, New York	Eastern	Inactive	
Gamma Chi			San Jose, California	Western	Inactive	
Gamma Psi			Charleston, South Carolina	Mid-Eastern	Inactive	
**Gamma Omega**			San Bernardino, California	Western	Active	
Delta Alpha			Marshall, Texas	Southern	Inactive	
Delta Beta			Albion, Michigan	Northern	Inactive	
**Delta Gamma**			Belzoni, Mississippi	Southeastern	Active	
**Delta Epsilon**			Las Vegas, Nevada	Western	Active	
Delta Zeta			Baltimore, Maryland	Eastern	Inactive	
Delta Eta			Tampa, Florida	Southeastern	Inactive	
Delta Theta			Jackson, Mississippi	Southeastern	Inactive	
Delta Iota			White Plains, New York	Eastern	Inactive	
**Delta Kappa**			San Antonio, Texas	Southern	Active	
Delta Lambda			Tehula, Mississippi	Southeastern	Inactive	
Delta Mu			Fernandina Beach, Florida	Southeastern	Inactive	
Delta Nu			Plano, Texas	Southern	Inactive	
Delta Xi			Jackson, Michigan	Northern	Inactive	
Delta Omicron			Nashville, Tennessee	Eastern	Inactive	
Delta Pi			Winston-Salem, North Carolina	Mid-Eastern	Inactive	
Delta Rho			St. Petersburg, Florida	Southeastern	Inactive	
Delta Sigma			Fayetteville, North Carolina	Mid-Eastern	Inactive	
**Delta Tau**			Grand Blanc, Michigan	Northern	Active	
Delta Upsilon			Tallahassee, Florida	Southeastern	Inactive	
Delta Phi			Monroe, Louisiana	Southern	Inactive	
Delta Chi			Southfield, Michigan	Northern	Inactive	
**Delta Psi**	March 26, 2010		Georgia	Southeastern	Active	
**Delta Omega**			Memphis, Tennessee	Mid-Eastern	Active	
Epsilon Alpha			Northern Virginia	Eastern	Inactive	
**Epsilon Beta**			Columbia and Lugoff, South Carolina	Mid-Eastern	Active	
**Epsilon Gamma**			Central Carolina	Mid-Eastern	Active	
**Epsilon Delta**			Palmdale, California	Western	Active	
**Epsilon Epsilon**			Maryland	Eastern	Active	
**Epsilon Zeta**			Maryland	Eastern	Active	
**Epsilon Eta**			Pearland, Texas	Southern	Active	
**Epsilon Iota**			Northern Virginia	Eastern	Active	
Epsilon Theta			Starke, Florida	Southeastern	Inactive	

== Notable members ==
=== Honorary members ===
- R. Louise Grooms, founder of the Detroit Institute of Commerce with her own money, to train African American youths with skills to enter the workplace. Member of Michigan Women's Hall of Fame

== See also ==
- List of African-American Greek and fraternal organizations
- Professional fraternities and sororities
