= Malkia Roberts =

American painter (1927–2004)

- Born: February 2, 1917; Washington, D.C.
- Died: April 28, 2004 (age 87); Silver Spring, MD
- Education: University of Michigan; Howard University
- Known for: Painting
- Notable work: "Out of the Blues"
- Style: Abstract

Lucille Elizabeth Davis "Malkia" Roberts (1917–2004) was an American painter and educator known for her African-inspired themes and long career in Washington, D.C. A graduate of Howard University and the University of Michigan, she taught in D.C. public schools for decades. Roberts also held academic positions at several universities, including Howard. Influenced by her travels to Africa and studies in sociology, Roberts blended intellectual themes with vibrant artistic expression. Her work was widely exhibited and remains in numerous public and private collections, reflecting her deep engagement with cultural heritage and artistic education.

== Life ==
Born in Washington, D.C., Roberts earned her bachelor's degree from Howard University and a Master of Fine Arts degree from the University of Michigan. Roberts taught for D.C. public schools throughout her career, including Duke Ellington School of the Arts and Shaw Junior High School, where she taught alongside Alma Thomas for forty years. She held professorships of art and art history at D.C. Teachers College, State University of New York at Oswego, Washington Technical Institute and American University. Roberts traveled extensively during her career, but much of her work was informed by African themes and topics. Roberts also studied with Hale Woodruff and taught at Howard University from 1976 to 1985. Roberts exhibited widely, and numerous private and public collections include her works. According to Roberts, her studies heavily influenced her: "I have various degrees in Sociology which allow me to inject intellectual themes into my artistry." In addition, her "travels to Africa ... greatly influenced [her] style and direction of work."

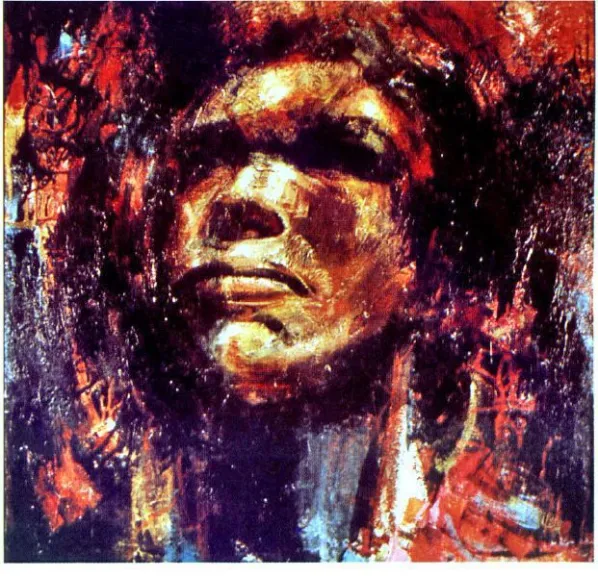
Malkia Roberts ( 1923 ), “Spectrum” Acrylic on canvas 1972
