= Pensole =

Footwear design school in Portland, Oregon

Pensole Footwear Design Academy
- Type: Private
- Established: 2010
- Head: D'Wayne Edwards
- Location: Portland, Oregon, United States; 45.52342°N 122.67508°W
- Campus: Urban
- Website: pensole.com
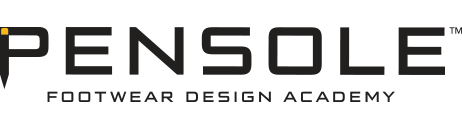

Pensole Footwear Design Academy is a footwear design school based in Portland, Oregon. Founded in 2010 by D’Wayne Edwards, the school has partnerships with institutions such as Parsons The New School for Design, Art Center College of Design, and Massachusetts Institute of Technology, as well as brands such as Foot Locker, Asics, and Adidas. D'Wayne Edwards is a former design director of Brand Jordan, a subsidiary of Oregon-based Nike. The school has also worked with Adidas, whose North American headquarters are in Portland, and also holds a design competition called the Future of Footwear.

== History ==
Pensole was founded in 2010 and began by holding classes at various venues, including the University of Oregon's Portland Center. The name comes from "pencil" (a design tool) and "sole" (a part of a shoe). The founder of the academy, D’Wayne Edwards, entered the industry without formal training and worked for LA Gear, Skechers, and Sity before spending ten years at Nike with the Jordan Brand. Pensole began as a program partnered with the University of Oregon. The school moved to Portland's Old Town neighborhood in the Northwest area in January 2012. In 2013, Pensole started classes for professionals in the shoe industry. Pensole held a World Sneaker Championship in 2014. The associated foundation began selling shares in the school in 2014 to raise $7.5 million. Pensole raised $4 million through a partnership with Rooy Inc. in 2015.

== Academics ==
The school offers introductory classes to college and high school students held on Saturdays. Pensole also offers classes for those in the design profession and middle school students. Students come from all over the United States and globally. Pensole also has a materials library (MLab) and has a class specifically for materials, colors, and finishing.

In addition to the usual 11-week courses, there are also week-long courses held during spring break and other short-term courses. The 11-week courses are equivalent to a full college semester. Some programs allow students to earn credit toward their degrees at other colleges and universities. Instructors include people from Nike and other Oregon-based footwear companies. Pensole is located at 10 Northwest Fifth Avenue along Burnside in the Old Town neighborhood. Classes are also held in other cities, such as Las Vegas. The school has partnered with Parsons The New School for Design to hold classes in New York City, with Art Center College of Design in Pasadena, California, and with the Massachusetts Institute of Technology in Boston.
