= Gamma Phi Delta =

African American service sorority

- ΓΦΔ
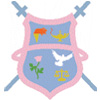
- Founded: February 28, 1943; 83 years ago Lewis College of Business
- Type: Service
- Affiliation: Coalition of Black Business Sororities
- Status: Active
- Emphasis: African American
- Scope: National
- Motto: "Peace and Harmony"
- Colors: Baby pink Baby blue
- Symbol: Lamp
- Flower: Pink rose
- Jewel: Pearl
- Mascot: Dove and butterfly
- Publication: The Lamplighter
- Chapters: 3 active collegiate, 57 active graduate
- Headquarters: 2657 West Grand Boulevard; Detroit, Michigan 48208-1203; United States
- Website: www.gammaphideltasorority.com

Gamma Phi Delta (ΓΦΔ) is a historically African American service sorority for businesswomen, professionals, and students. It was founded in 1943 at the Lewis College of Business and expanded to have chapters across the united states The sorority is an affiliate of the National Council of Negro Women.

== History ==
Sisters Elizabeth Garner and Violet T. Lewis founded the Phi Gamma Delta sorority at the Lewis College of Business in Detroit, Michigan on February 28, 1943. Lewis was the owner and president of the college and Lewis was a teacher. Phi Gamma Delta was a business and professional sorority.

The two founders recruited eleven members; these thirteen women are called the Sorority's 13 Original Pearls. They are:

- Annie Blakemore
- Robely Trumbo Dungey
- Elizabeth Garner
- Lula Garner
- Odell Glover
- Eurine Harrison
- Ivalue Lennear
- Violet T. Lewis
- Jean Myers
- Geraldine Harrison Perkins
- Beatrice Preston
- Ruby Tipton
- Mattie Willis

Each of the Original Pearls was tasked with starting a chapter of Gamma Phi Delta in her home city. In February 1946, Ivalue Lennear formed the Gamma chapter in Indianapolis, Indiana, her hometown. As a special dispensation, the chapter was allowed to use Gamma, instead of Beta, as its name.

Around 1945, the Phi Gamma Delta fraternity filed a lawsuit against the sorority to discontinue using its name illegally. The fraternity had formed more than 100 years before but had never applied for a copyright for the use of the name Phi Gamma Delta. However, the sorority had received a copyright for the name. Despite this, the fraternity consisted of wealthy and powerful men, including presidents, senators, and congressmen. Fearing a lengthy and expensive legal battle, the sorority settled with the fraternity, agreeing to change its name in exchange for $10,000 and payment of legal fees. At that time, the sorority voted to change its name to Gamma Phi Delta.

By 1970, the sorority had 62 chapters in 32 states and the Bahamas. It is a member of the Coalition of Black Business Sororities, which also includes Eta Phi Beta, Iota Phi Lambda, and Lambda Kappa Mu.

Gamma Phi Delta seeks to improve youth education and units for civic and community awareness. The sorority's headquarters is located at 2657 West Grand Blvd. in Detroit, Michigan. The City of Detroit designated the building as part of the West Grand Boulevard African American Arts and Business Historic District on July 24, 2018.

== Symbols ==
Gamma Phi Delta's motto is "Peace and Harmony". The sorority's colors are baby pink and baby blue. Its symbols are the butterfly, dove, and lamp. Its flower is the pink rose and its gemstone is the pearl. The Gamma Phi Delta publication is The Lamplighter.

== Chapters ==
Gamma Phi Delta has both collegiate and graduate chapters across the United States.

== Philanthropy ==
The Gamma Phi Delta Foundation was established in October 1987 to oversee youth scholarships and educational projects.

On the national level, the sorority awards three scholarships and one endowment award annually. The scholarships are: The Gamma Phi Delta Merit Scholarship; the Elizabeth Garner Memorial Scholarship, and the Undergraduate Scholarship. Its endowment is called The Ann McElwee Perpetual Endowment Fund.

At the local level, chapters raise funds to support education and locally awarded scholarships. Members also participate in a variety of community service projects with local charities.

== Membership ==
Gamma Phi Delta has five membership types: undergraduate, graduate, association, honorary, and member-at-large. Membership is by invitation. Members are required to have completed two years of college study.

== Notable members ==
- Willie B. Kennedy – second African-American member of the San Francisco Board of Supervisors and co-founder of the Gamma Phi Delta Foundation
- Violet T. Lewis (Alpha) – educator, businesswoman, and founder of Lewis College of Business and Gamma Phi Delta
