= Mary Ritter Beard =

American historian and women's suffrage activist (1876–1958)

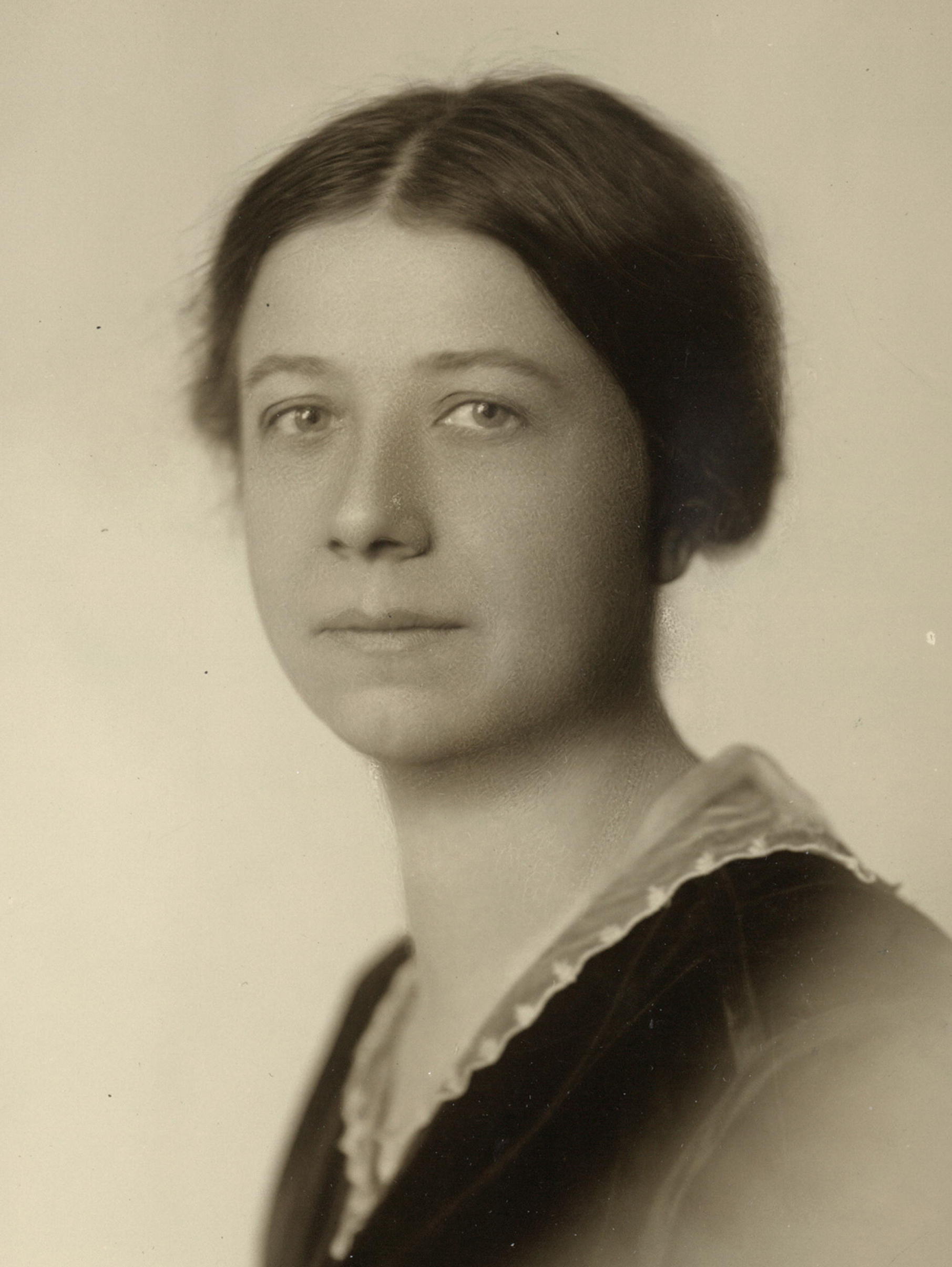
- Beard, c. 1914
- Born: Mary Ritter; August 5, 1876; Indianapolis, Indiana, U.S.
- Died: August 14, 1958 (aged 82); Phoenix, Arizona, U.S.
- Resting place: Hartsdale, New York, U.S.
- Education: DePauw University
- Occupations: Women's rights activist, historian, and archivist
- Employers: New York City Suffrage Party; Congressional Union; World Center for Women's Archives (1935–1940)
- Spouse: Charles A. Beard (m. 1900; died 1948)

Mary Ritter Beard (August 5, 1876 – August 14, 1958) was an American historian, author, women's suffrage activist, and women's history archivist who was also a lifelong advocate of social justice. As a Progressive Era reformer, Beard was active in both the labor and women's rights movements. She also authored several books on women's role in history including On Understanding Women (1931), America Through Women's Eyes (editor, 1933), and Woman as Force in History: A Study in Traditions and Realities (1946), her major work. In addition, she collaborated with her husband, historian Charles Austin Beard, as coauthor of seven textbooks, most notably The Rise of American Civilization (1927), two volumes, and America in Midpassage: A Study of the Idea of Civilization (1939) and The American Spirit (1942), the third and fourth volume of The Rise of American Civilization series. A standalone book, Basic History of the United States, was their best-selling work.

During the early decades of the twentieth century, Beard actively supported passage of the Nineteenth Amendment and was involved with several women's suffrage organizations that included the Women's Trade Union League, the Equality League of Self-Supporting Women (later renamed the Women's Political Union), the New York City Suffrage Party, and the Wage Earners' Suffrage League. She was also a member of the advisory board of the Congressional Union for Woman Suffrage (later called the National Woman's Party. For a time, she edited suffrage publications, The Woman Voter and The Suffragist.

Beard's interest in women's history led to her work in establishing the World Center for Women's Archives in 1935 in New York City. Although the center closed in 1940, largely due to internal issues and lack of funding, her efforts encouraged several colleges and universities to begin collecting similar records on women's history. Beard was a consultant on the early development of women's history archives at Radcliffe and Smith Colleges, which eventually led to establishment of the Arthur and Elizabeth Schlesinger Library on the History of Women in America at Radcliffe Institute for Advanced Study, Harvard University, and the Sophia Smith Collection at Smith College.

== Early life ==
=== Family background ===
Mary Ritter was born on August 5, 1876, in Indianapolis, Indiana, to Narcissa (Lockwood) and Eli Foster Ritter. She was the family's fourth child and the eldest daughter.

Mary's mother was born in Paris, Kentucky, and graduated from Brookville Academy in Thornton, Kentucky. She worked as a teacher in Kentucky before moving with her family in 1861 to Greencastle, Indiana (home to Asbury, now DePauw University).

Her father was the son of Rachel (Jessup) and James Ritter. He was born and grew up on his parents' farm west of Indianapolis in Hendricks County, Indiana. After attending Northwestern Christian University (present-day Butler University) in Indianapolis from 1859 to 1861, he enlisted in the Union Army in April 1861, joining the 16th Indiana Infantry Regiment shortly after the outbreak of the American Civil War. Eli Ritter was later transferred to the 79th Indiana Infantry Regiment before being honorably discharged from the army in June 1863. Following his military service, he enrolled at Asbury University, graduating with a bachelor's degree in 1865. He married Narcissa Lockwood, a Greencastle resident, in June 1866. Due to weak eyesight, resulting from exposure during the war, Eli Ritter relied on his wife, Narcissa, to read to him during his legal studies. After he passed the Indiana bar in 1866, the Ritters moved to Indianapolis, where Eli established a law practice. In addition, he was active in the temperance movement and in 1883 became a colonel in the Indiana National Guard.

=== Education and intellectual development ===
Mary Ritter attended public schools in Indianapolis and graduated from Shortridge High School in 1893 as valedictorian of her class. Around the age of sixteen, she enrolled in 1893 at DePauw University, the alma mater of her father and her other siblings, and became a member of Kappa Alpha Theta sorority. She also served as president of her class.

Ritter graduated from DePauw in 1897 with a Bachelor of Philosophy (PhB) degree. Ritter later claimed to be influenced by two sorority sisters at DePauw who refused to limit themselves to conventional coursework and activities for women. Another early influence on Ritter was her German professor, Henry B. Longden, who incorporated culture, literature, and philosophy into his teaching of the German language, asking his students to view their studies in a much broader context.

While attending college, Ritter met and began a relationship with Charles Austin Beard, a fellow student and her future husband. Beard, a native of Henry County, Indiana, was the son of a wealthy farmer and real-estate investor. After attending Spiceland Academy (a Quaker school in Henry County), Beard enrolled at DePauw University in 1894, and became a Phi Beta Kappa graduate in 1898.

=== Marriage and family life ===
After graduating from DePauw in 1897, Ritter found employment in Greencastle as a public high school German language teacher, while Beard, then her fiancé, traveled to England in August 1898 to pursue graduate studies at the University of Oxford. He also helped to establish Ruskin Hall (present-day Ruskin College), a free university for working-class men, before returning to the United States in late 1899.

The couple married in March 1900. A month later, they moved to England, where they initially lived at Oxford, then relocated to Manchester while Charles continued his studies and worked as director of Ruskin Hall's extension department. Their daughter, Miriam, the first of their two children, was born at Manchester in 1901.

In 1902, after deciding to return to the United States, the Beards settled in New York City, where they both enrolled as graduate students in the School of Political Science at Columbia University. By 1904, Mary Ritter Beard had discontinued her studies in sociology and became more active in the women's suffrage movement. The Beards' son, William, was born in 1907, the same year they bought a sixteen-room home in New Milford, Connecticut, where they frequently entertained guests.

Charles Beard completed his doctor of philosophy (PhD) degree in history, and became a faculty member at Columbia University. He resigned his professorship in 1917 as a protest, following the dismissal of three anti-war faculty members during World War I, but continued his career as a writer and historian.

== European influences ==
While living in England from 1900 to 1902, Mary Beard studied history and taught German. She also observed the plight of the working class in British industrial society. Beard became involved in the British labor and women's suffrage movements through her friendships with radical suffragists and socialist reformers Emmeline Pankhurst and her daughters, Christabel Pankhurst and Sylvia Pankhurst, who were members of the Independent Labour Party, and other leaders. Beard's acquaintances with European intellectuals also influenced her interests in the struggles of the working class, progressive politics, social reform, and social injustice.

== Suffrage movement ==
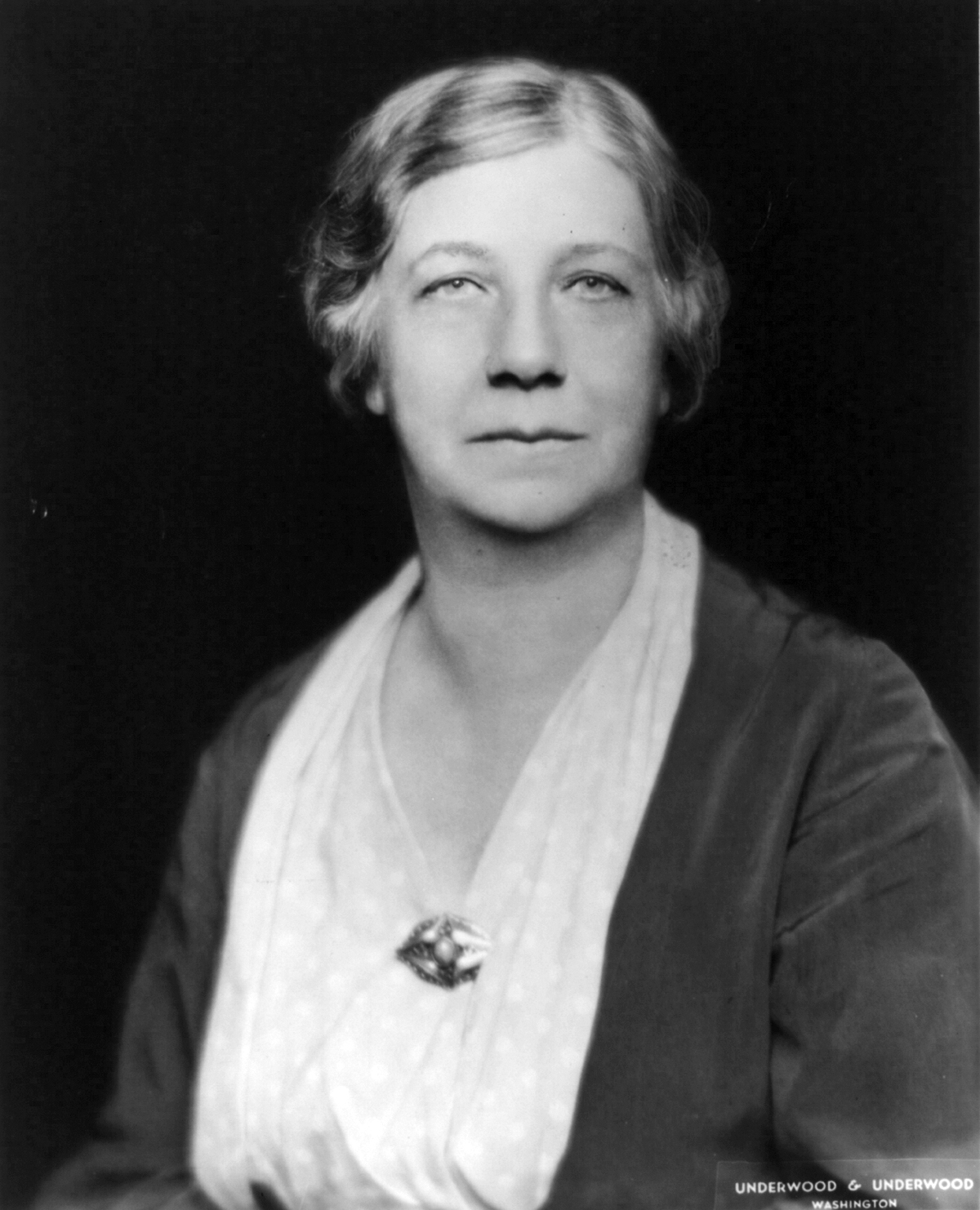
Mary Ritter Beard – undated photograph

Beard became involved with radical supporters of the women's suffrage movement in England through her friendship with Emmeline Pankhurst, a neighbor in Manchester, and Pankhurst's daughters. Beard also began to support issues affecting working-class women. After the Beards returned to the United States in 1902, Mary continued her activism in labor organizations such as the New York Women's Trade Union League (WTUL), where she hoped to improve the conditions in which women labored. In addition to WTUL, Beard was active in the Equality League of Self-Supporting Women (later the Women's Political Union).

Beard came to believe that suffrage would give women a tool to elect political leaders who would, in turn, implement social justice reforms and governmental regulations to improve economic conditions and the lives of the working class. By 1910 she was active in women's suffrage activities in New York as a member of the New York City Suffrage Party (NYCSP), led by Carrie Chapman Catt. From 1910 to 1912, Beard also edited its publication The Woman Voter, before focusing more of her efforts on the Wage-Earners' Suffrage League.

Beard left the NYCSP in 1913 to join the Congressional Union for Woman Suffrage (CU) (later called the National Woman's Party) under the leadership of Alice Paul and Lucy Burns. As a member of this radical faction of the women's suffrage movement, Beard helped to organize women's suffrage rallies and served as editor of its weekly magazine. The Suffragist. At Paul's request, Beard became a member of the Union's congressional committee. She was among the organizers of a major woman's suffrage parade in Washington, D.C., on March 3, 1913, and served as a marshal for a section of the parade that included many African American women, who Beard insisted should participate. Beard's contributions to the Congressional Union also included strategy planning, organizing and participating in demonstrations, delivering lectures, writing articles, and testifying before Congress, including an appearance before a U.S. House of Representatives congressional committee on women's suffrage in 1914. Shortly before her resignation from the National Woman's Party's Advisory Council, Beard lead a New York delegation to Washington, D.C., in November 1917 to show support for the women's suffrage activists (Silent Sentinels) who were picketing in front of the White House.

== Writings ==
=== Collaborations with Charles Beard ===
From their home in Connecticut, Mary and Charles Beard co-authored seven books together, beginning with American Citizenship (1914), a high school textbook. Although they are named as coauthors, their contemporaries, including book reviewers and fellow historians, overlooked Mary's contributions. Historians Barbara Turoff, Ann Lane, and Nancy Cott, in their assessment of Mary Beard's works, and Ellen Nore, in her research on Charles Beard, have concluded that the Beards' collaboration was a full partnership, as the couple confirmed, but the Beards did not fully describe their individual contributions to their published works.

=== Individual and edited works ===
Mary Beard's Woman's Work in Municipalities (1915), the first of six books that she wrote as a solo author, argued that women's social reform efforts could be considered political activities as well. She also urged women to pursue leadership positions in municipal government. Beard's book, A Short History of the American Labor Movement (1920), concerns social reform and the working class, but she is best known for her authored and edited works on women's history, especially On Understanding Women (1931), America Through Women's Eyes (editor, 1933), and her major work, Woman as Force in History: A Study in Traditions and Realities (1946) her most influential publication. To increase interest in research on women's history, Beard used multiple channels of communication, including pamphlets, radio shows, articles, speeches, and books.

Beard's Woman as Force in History (1946) challenges the traditional feminists' view and argues that women had always been active agents in history alongside men. She further contends that focusing on women as victims instead of their impact in the world was distorted and inaccurate. Beard also believed that a woman's social class and her gender play important roles in her achievements.

Beard rejected the feminist idea that women had been subjugated by men and "deliberately played down the very real constrictions on women through the centuries." She believed strongly in encouraging women through her writing about the importance of women's history, declaring: "We cannot know how our own society has been built up without known women's share in establishing free speech, free assembly, freedom of worship, all civil liberties, all humanism, all the branches of learning and everything else we value." Beard also wrote a 56-page pamphlet, "A Changing Political Economy as it Affects American Women" (1934), sponsored by the American Association of University Women, that was a prototype for a course on women's studies. Despite her efforts, she was unable to gain its adoption for college- or university-level courses.

Beard also wrote and edited other books on women's history: Laughing Their Way: Women's Humor in America (coedited with Martha Bensley Bruère, 1934), and The Force of Women in Japanese History (1953). Her final book was a tribute to her husband, The Making of Charles Beard (1955).

=== Women's history scholar ===
With the successful passage of the Nineteenth Amendment to the U.S. Constitution in 1920, Beard began to concentrate more on her writing and to further develop her philosophy concerning women in history, which frequently set her at odds with the feminist movement.

Mary and Charles Beard were active supporters of the "New History" movement, which sought to include social, cultural, and economic factors in written history—an important step towards including the contributions of women. Mary Beard expanded on this concept, contending that the proper study of women's "long history", from primitive pre-history to the present, would reveal that women have always played a central role in all civilizations. She also emphasized that women were different from men, but that did not make their contributions of any less value, only that their significance was simply not being recognized.

In the 1930s, Beard disagreed with feminists of the era, who she believed viewed their history as one of oppression. She also created a controversy over her rejection of the feminist goal of equality with men, feminists sought to achieve through passage of an Equal Rights Amendment, which Beard opposed, among other activities. To Beard, the traditional feminist view of women's oppression was not only inaccurate but unhelpful, and that striving for equality with men was an inadequate goal, especially in relation to education. Beard felt the women can and should offer something different and more socially beneficial to society, and that women should be providers of "culture and civilization".

=== Archivist ===
In 1935, international peace activist and feminist Rosika Schwimmer suggested the idea to Beard of establishing the World Center for Women's Archives (WCWA), which held its first organizational meeting in New York City in October 1935. As director of the center for the next five years, Beard broadened the scope of the project beyond collecting the documents related to women in the peace movement. She hoped to collect in a central repository any and all manner of women's published and unpublished records and other archival materials related to women's history at an international level. She also planned to establish an institution for women's research, education, and political initiatives, as well as supporting efforts to aid in the writing of history. Beard chose the center's motto, "No documents, no history," from a quote by French historian Numa Denis Fustel de Coulanges.

Through Beard's contacts, the center accumulated project sponsors. In addition, Carrie Chapman Catt, Jane Addams, Harriet Stanton Blatch, and other prominent women such as Alice Paul, Georgia O'Keeffe, Fannie Hurst, and Inez Haynes Irwin also offered their support. Schwimmer resigned from the center's board of directors in 1936, but Eleanor Roosevelt and Frances Perkins endorsed the WCWA, which was officially launched in New York City on December 15, 1937. The center initially gained publicity and support for its efforts to collect materials, preserve records, and generate interest in women's history. However, as director of the center, Beard dealt with a multitude of competing interests, a result of long-standing differences within the women's movement, as well as insufficient funding and disagreements among its leadership. The Center never lived up to Beard's expectations and she resigned in 1940. The WCWA closed later that year, largely because of internal strife and a lack of funding, without fully achieving its goals.

Beard's work with the WCWA encouraged several colleges and universities to begin collecting similar records on women's history. She is credited with helping to develop a women's history archives at Radcliffe and Smith colleges, which eventually led to establishing the Arthur and Elizabeth Schlesinger Library on the History of Women in America at the Radcliffe Institute for Advanced Study at Harvard University and the Sophia Smith Collection at Smith. In addition, some of the WCWA's records were transferred to smaller collections such as the New Jersey Historical Society. Beard's efforts at the WCWA also inspired the later work of the Women's Project of New Jersey, Inc.

=== Critique of Britannica ===
After the dissolution of the World Centre for Women's Archives in 1940, Beard's next project, beginning in 1941, was an analysis of Encyclopædia Britannica's representation of women, produced following the suggestion of Walter Yust, chief editor of the Britannica. Beard convened a team of fellow female scholars (Dora Edinger, Janet A. Selig, and Marjorie White) to produce A Study of the Encyclopædia Britannica in Relation to its Treatment of Women. Beard and her colleagues collaborated on the project over an 18-month period, and in November 1942 delivered the 42-page report to Yust. Despite Yust's expressed interest and assurances that the Britannica would include improvements, the report's recommendations were ignored. Beard was disappointed with the result, and in 1947 correspondence she suggested that women should no longer write for the publication.

The report included significant recommendations on existing articles, as well as suggestions for new articles. For example, the authors noted that the treatment of abortion was not comprehensive. Arguing that it was more than a moral question, the researchers proposed that abortion was also relevant to population, political, health, medical, and social issues. The study also noted that the article on education was too masculine; questioned why there was no article on "Queen;" and why women were not included in the Britannica's treatment of health and medicine. Additionally, from the article on "Song" the report noted: "No women sang in Europe, it appears from this review. The contributions of nuns, in choir composition and singing, is not recognized at all." Topics that the authors recommended for inclusion included bathing, breadmaking, dyeing, hospital, hunger, laundrying, and salons, among others.

== Later years ==
Mary Beard became an active member of the Women's International League for Peace and Freedom. Mary and Charles Beard, both of whom were pacifists, also opposed the United States' involvement in World War II.

After Charles's death in 1948, at North Haven, Connecticut, Mary continued to write and remain active into her late seventies. Her final books were The Force of Women in Japanese History (1953), published two decades after she and her husband had visited Japan in 1922–23, and The Making of Charles Beard (1955), a tribute to her late husband. After becoming ill around the age of eighty, she moved to Scottsdale, Arizona, to live near her son, William.

== Death and legacy ==
Mary Beard died of kidney failure on August 14, 1958, at the age of eighty-two, at Phoenix in Maricopa County, Arizona. Her remains are interred in Ferncliff Cemetery at Hartsdale in Westchester County, New York, beside those of her husband, Charles, who had died on September 1, 1948, at 73.

Despite Beard's efforts to acquire the personal papers of women throughout the world and from all time periods in history for the World Center for Women's Archives, she did not consider her own manuscripts, letters, and her other documents of value. Before their deaths, she and her husband, whose pacifist stance proved controversial in the last decade of his life, destroyed nearly all of their personal correspondence and papers that they considered confidential. Mary Beard did not plan to publish any of their letters and did not want others to do so; however, some of the surviving letters found in the collections of other individuals were later published.

Mary and Charles Beards' legacy stems from their published works. The couple's co-authorship of broad and inclusive textbooks was innovative for their time. In addition to incorporating social, economic, and political history, they included contemporary issues and women's contributions to civilization. Margaret Crocco points out that the interdisciplinary approach the Beards used in their textbooks encouraged the development of academic programs in American society in the 1930s and 1940s at colleges and universities including Yale University, Brown University, the University of Minnesota, and the University of Pennsylvania. Mary was retroactively elected to membership in Phi Beta Kappa in 1939. (In 1897, when she graduated from DePauw University, only males were awarded this academic honor.)

In History and Feminism: A Glass Half Full (1993), Judith Zinsser argues that beginning in the 1930s, Mary Beard "was the most well-known authority and advocate for women's history in the United States." Beard's writings and the actions she took during her life on behalf of women's suffrage, labor issues, and establishment of women's archives also helped to illuminate the contributions that women made throughout history. By end of twentieth century, other historians began to consciously integrate women's contributions to history in their publications such as Howard Zinn's revision of A People's History of the United States (rev. 1995). Margaret Crocco concluded that Mary Beard's perspectives on women's history, in general, and Beard's contention that women have also been active agents in history "remain at the forefront of the field today." In The Majority Finds Its Past: Placing Women in History (1979), historian Gerda Lerner described the ongoing efforts to write about women's history as continuing the work that Beard had begun.

Although Beard's work to establish a women's archive in New York City was unsuccessful, she consulted on other women's archive initiatives that eventually lead to the establishment of the Schlesinger Library at the Radcliffe Institute for Advanced Study at Harvard University, as well as the Sophia Smith Collection at the Neilson Library at Smith College, and other women's history projects such as those in New Jersey.

One of Mary Beard's indirect legacies was the development of women's history courses, which have become standard offerings on American college campuses. Her work "A Changing Political Economy as It Affects American Women" is an early example of a women's history course syllabus. Women's history has evolved into an academic field of study. In 1970, the Indiana University-South Bend campus began what is the oldest continuing women's studies program in the United States.

== Selected published works ==
- American Citizenship (1914, with Charles Beard)
- Woman's Work in Municipalities (1915)
- A Short History of the American Labor Movement (1920)
- History of the United States (1921, with Charles Beard)
- The Rise of American Civilization (1927, with Charles Beard)
- The American Labor Movement. A Short History (1931)
- On Understanding Women (1931, Edition 1977)
- America Through Women's Eyes (editor, 1933)
- A Changing Political Economy as It Affects American Women (1934)
- Laughing Their Way: Women's Humor in America (1934, coedited with Martha Bensley Bruiere
- The Making of American Civilization (1937, with Charles Beard)
- America in Midpassage (1939, with Charles Beard)
- The American Spirit. A Study of the Idea of Civilization in the United States (1942, with Charles Beard)
- Basic History of the United States (1944, with Charles Beard)
- Woman as Force in History. A Study in Traditions and Realities (1946)
- The Force of Women in Japanese History (Washington: Public Affairs Press, 1953).
- The Making of Charles Beard (1955).

== See also ==
- Coverture
