= List of Chi Omega chapters =

This is the list of Chi Omega chapters. Chi Omega's first series chapters (single-letter) are named for 24 of the Greek letters and assigned in an order customized to Chi Omega, approximating a reverse alphabetical order. The Omega chapter is reserved as a memorial designation; subsequent chapters have likewise not been assigned using the letter Omega in their names. Each subsequent series, (Alpha Alpha series, Alpha Beta series, where the second letter marks the name of the series) follow generally that same naming convention established with the first series, thus beginning with a Psi chapter and naming its chapters through Alpha. For purposes of this table, where a single prospective chapter name went unused in a series, it is shown in its assumed place within that series, and marked as unassigned. The Alpha Epsilon series was only partly used: this occurring in the early 1950s, with 17 of those names unassigned (including Omega). The Alpha Eta series was not used, with all of its 24 names unassigned (including Omega). The Alpha Iota series was not used, likewise with all 24 names unassigned (including Omega). The most recent chapter names assigned have been in the Alpha Mu series.

Since Chi Omega's founding, eight chapter names have been reassigned, with the last of these occurring in 1943. (Note: When a name is reassigned, the former chapter is named with the appended word "(Old)". Hence, "Chi (Old)". In seven of the eight cases no further chapter activity has occurred on the earlier campuses. The only exception is at Oglethorpe, site of Sigma Gamma (Old). 26 years after the closure of the original Sigma Gamma (Old) chapter a new Oglethorpe chapter was established, but was forced to use a new name. --At the time, the reassigned, or "new" Sigma Gamma chapter was active, thus the Oglethorpe group's earlier name couldn't be repurposed to its original school.)

== Chapters ==
Following are the Chi Omega chapters. Active chapters are noted in bold, inactive chapters and institutions are noted in italics.

Chapter	Chartered/Range	Institution	City	State	Status	Ref.
**Psi**	April 5, 1895	University of Arkansas	Fayetteville	Arkansas	Active	
Chi (Old)	1898–1902	Jessamine Female Institute	Nicholasville	Kentucky	Reassigned	(Note: Jessamine Female Institute closed sometime between 1899 and 1902.)
Phi (Old)	1899–1900	Hellmuth Ladies' College	London	Ontario, Canada	Reassigned	(Note: Likely the first international chapter of any NPC sorority, this school was affiliated with neighboring Hellmuth College, a men's school. Both are long-dormant.) (Note: Hellmuth Women's [Ladies] College, and the men's college to which it was attached, closed in 1901.)
Upsilon (Old)	1899–1900	Ward–Belmont College	Nashville	Tennessee	Reassigned	(Note: Originated as Sigma Epsilon (local), which had formed prior to 1899.) (Note: Ward-Belmont College closed in 1951.)
**Tau**	1899–1911, 1926	University of Mississippi	Oxford	Mississippi	Active	(Note: Originated as Sigma Tau (local), which had formed in 1896.)
Sigma	1899–1960	Randolph College	Lynchburg	Virginia	Inactive	(Note: While the chapter was active, this school was known as Randolph-Macon Woman's College.)
**Rho**	1900	Tulane University	New Orleans	Louisiana	Active	(Note: Originated as Sigma Delta (local), which had formed in 1898.)
**Pi**	1900	University of Tennessee	Knoxville	Tennessee	Active	
**Omicron**	1900	University of Illinois Urbana-Champaign	Champaign	Illinois	Active	
**Xi**	1901	Northwestern University	Evanston	Illinois	Active	
**Nu**	1902	University of Wisconsin	Madison	Wisconsin	Active	
**Mu**	1902	University of California	Berkeley	California	Active	
**Lambda**	1902	University of Kansas	Lawrence	Kansas	Active	
**Kappa**	1903	University of Nebraska	Lincoln	Nebraska	Active	
**Phi Alpha**	1903–1968, 2008	George Washington University (Note: George Washington University was named Columbian University for its first 80 years. One year after the establishment of Phi Alpha chapter the school was given its current name, George Washington University. The chapter's charter and earliest documents will reflect the earlier school name.)	Washington	D.C.	Active	(Note: Originated as Phi Alpha (local), which had formed in 1901.)
**Chi**	1903	Transylvania University	Lexington	Kentucky	Active	
**Upsilon**	1904–1911, 1924	Union University (Note: Union University was still called Southwestern Baptist University for three years after establishment of Upsilon chapter. It changed its name to Union University in 1907, in response to the gift of a substantial library collection from a donor.)	Jackson	Tennessee	Active	(Note: At its 1924 revival, this chapter formed by absorbing the Sigma Phi chapter of Sigma Sigma Sigma, which itself had been named after its earlier local, Sigma Phi, formed in 1905. The ΣΣΣ chapter was in place between 1909 and 1924.)
**Iota**	1904	University of Texas	Austin	Texas	Active	(Note: Originated as Sigma Tau (local), which had formed in 1902.)
**Eta**	1905	University of Michigan	Ann Arbor	Michigan	Active	(Note: Originated as Theta Sigma (local), which had formed in 1904.)
**Theta**	1906	West Virginia University	Morgantown	West Virginia	Active	(Note: Originated as Phi Pi Alpha (local), which had formed in 1899.)
**Zeta**	1906	University of Colorado	Boulder	Colorado	Active	(Note: Originated as Phi Epsilon (local), which had formed in 1901.)
Beta	1906–1984	Colby College (Note: Greek organizations were banned at Colby College in 1984.)	Waterville	Maine	Inactive	(Note: Originated as Phi Beta (local), which had formed in 1900.)
Epsilon (Old)	1906–1915	Barnard College (Columbia)	Manhattan	New York	Reassigned	(Note: Originated as the X Club (local), which had formed in 1900.)
Delta	1907–1971	Dickinson College	Carlisle	Pennsylvania	Inactive	(Note: Originated as Omega Psi (local), which had formed in 1899.)
**Gamma**	1908	Florida State University	Tallahassee	Florida	Active	(Note: Originated as Beta Rho (local), which had formed in 1904.)
**Alpha**	1908	University of Washington	Seattle	Washington	Active	(Note: Originated as Alpha Gamma (local), which had formed earlier in 1908.)
**Omega**		Memorial chapter			Memorial	
**Psi Alpha**	1909	University of Oregon	Eugene	Oregon	Active	(Note: Originated as Zeta Iota Phi (local), which had formed in 1907.)
**Chi Alpha**	1910	Tufts University	Medford	Massachusetts	Active	(Note: Originated as Alpha Kappa Gamma (local), which had formed in 1895.)
Upsilon Alpha	1911–1992	Syracuse University	Syracuse	New York	Inactive	(Note: Originated as Rho Beta Upsilon (local), which had formed in 1904.)
**Tau Alpha**	1913	Ohio University	Athens	Ohio	Active	(Note: Originated as the Alpha chapter of Pi Delta Kappa, a small regional (Ohio) sorority that had formed in 1907.)
**Sigma Alpha**	1913	Miami University	Oxford	Ohio	Active	(Note: Originated as the Beta chapter of Pi Delta Kappa in 1909. For a brief time prior to its merger into ΠΔΚ this group had been named Alpha Gamma Chi (local).)
**Rho Alpha**	1913	University of Missouri	Columbia	Missouri	Active	(Note: Originated as Delta Rho (local), which had formed in 1909.)
**Pi Alpha**	1913	University of Cincinnati	Cincinnati	Ohio	Active	(Note: Originated as the Gamma chapter of Pi Delta Kappa in 1909.)
Omicron Alpha	1914–1997	Coe College	Cedar Rapids	Iowa	Inactive	(Note: Originated as Sigma Pi (local), which had formed in 1913.)
**Xi Alpha**	1914	University of Utah	Salt Lake City	Utah	Active	(Note: Originated as Theta Upsilon (local), which had formed in 1902.)
**Lambda Alpha**	1914	University of Kentucky	Lexington	Kentucky	Active	(Note: Originated as Mu Lambda (local), which had formed in 1913.)
**Mu Alpha**	1915	University of New Hampshire	Durham	New Hampshire	Active	(Note: Originated as Alpha Alpha Alpha (local), which had formed in 1894.)
**Nu Alpha**	1915–1944, 1991	Stanford University	Stanford	California	Active	(Note: Originated as the Longworthy Club (local), which had formed prior to 1915. At its 1991 reestablishment it absorbed Chi Alpha Pi (local), formed in 1990.)
**Kappa Alpha**	1915	Kansas State University	Manhattan	Kansas	Active	(Note: Originated as Theta Chi (local), which had formed in 1914.)
**Iota Alpha**	1916	Southern Methodist University	University Park	Texas	Active	(Note: Originated from a colony in 1915.)
Theta Alpha	1917–1963, 1987–2002	Cornell University	Ithaca	New York	Inactive	(Note: Originated as Phi Kappa (local), which had formed in 1916.)
**Eta Alpha**	August 24, 1917	Oregon State University	Corvallis	Oregon	Active	(Note: Originated as Zeta Alpha Omicron (local), which had formed earlier that year, on February 9, 1917.)
**Zeta Alpha**	1919	Ohio State University	Columbus	Ohio	Active	(Note: The Ohio State chapter was first organized in 1914 as the Beta chapter of Aloquin. It withdrew from that small state organization to operate locally, then chose to merge into Chi Omega in 1919.)
**Delta Alpha**	1919	University of Tennessee	Chattanooga	Tennessee	Active	(Note: Originated as Phi Tau Delta (local), which had formed in 1914.)
Gamma Alpha	1919–1934	Swarthmore College	Swarthmore	Pennsylvania	Inactive	(Note: Originated as Phi Sigma Phi (local), which had formed in 1918.)
**Beta Alpha**	1919	University of Pennsylvania	Philadelphia	Pennsylvania	Active	(Note: Originated as Tau Gamma Kappa (local), which had formed in 1915.)
**Epsilon Alpha**	1919	University of Oklahoma	Norman	Oklahoma	Active	(Note: Originated as Gamma Alpha Theta (local), which had formed in 1918.)
**Psi Beta**	1919	University of Iowa	Iowa City	Iowa	Active	(Note: Originated as Alpha Theta (local), which had formed in 1914.)
**Chi Beta**	1919	Purdue University	West Lafayette	Indiana	Active	(Note: Originated as Kappa Chi (local), which had formed in 1918.)
**Phi Beta**	1919	University of Pittsburgh	Pittsburgh	Pennsylvania	Active	(Note: Originated as Alpha Gamma Omicron (local), which had formed in 1917.)
Upsilon Beta (Old)	1919–1929	Hollins University	Hollins	Virginia	Reassigned	(Note: Originated as Beta Kappa (local), which had formed in 1905.)
**Tau Beta**	1920	Oklahoma State University	Stillwater	Oklahoma	Active	(Note: Originated as Kappa Chi (local), which had formed in 1917.)
**Sigma Beta**	1920	Montana State University	Bozeman	Montana	Active	(Note: Originated as Theta Xi (local), which had formed in 1917.)
Rho Beta	1921–1999	Drake University	Des Moines	Iowa	Inactive	(Note: Originated as Gamma Delta Phi (local), which had formed in 1907.)
**Pi Beta**	1921–1989, 2014	University of Minnesota	Minneapolis	Minnesota	Active	(Note: Originated as Delta Phi (local), which had formed in 1920.)
**Omicron Beta**	1921	College of William & Mary	Williamsburg	Virginia	Active	(Note: Originated as Beta Sigma Chi (local), which had formed in 1920.)
**Xi Beta**	1921	University of Maine	Orono	Maine	Active	(Note: Originated as Beta Gamma (local), which had formed in 1920.)
**Mu Beta**	1922	University of Georgia	Athens	Georgia	Active	(Note: Originated as Sigma Tau (local), which had formed in 1920.)
**Nu Beta**	1922	University of Alabama	Tuscaloosa	Alabama	Active	(Note: Originated as Chi Beta (local), which had formed in 1920.)
**Lambda Beta**	1922	University of Rhode Island	Kingston	Rhode Island	Active	(Note: Originated as Omicron Alpha Alpha (local), which had formed in 1917.)
**Kappa Beta**	1922	Rhodes College	Memphis	Tennessee	Active	(Note: Originated as Sigma Pi Gamma (local), which had formed in 1919.)
Iota Beta (Old)	1922–February 27, 1940	Hunter College (CUNY)	New York City	New York	Reassigned	(Note: Originated as Sigma Phi Omega (local), which had formed in 1910.)
**Theta Beta**	1922	Indiana University	Bloomington	Indiana	Active	(Note: Originated as Zeta Alpha Beta (local), which had formed in 1921.)
**Eta Beta**	1922	Iowa State University	Ames	Iowa	Active	(Note: Originated as Delta Mu (local), which had formed in 1920.)
**Zeta Beta**	1922	University of Arizona	Tucson	Arizona	Active	(Note: Originated as Chi Delta Phi (local), which had formed in 1921.)
Psi Gamma (Old)	1923–1942	University of North Dakota	Grand Forks	North Dakota	Reassigned	(Note: Originated as Kappa Chi (local), which had formed in 1922.)
**Epsilon Beta**	1923	University of North Carolina	Chapel Hill	North Carolina	Active	(Note: Originated as Lambda Tau (local), which had formed in 1921.)
Delta Beta	1923–1925	University of Maryland	College Park	Maryland	Inactive	
**Gamma Beta**	1923	University of California, Los Angeles	Los Angeles	California	Active	(Note: Originated as Phi Kappa Gamma (local), which had formed in 1917.)
**Beta Beta**	1923	Washington State University	Pullman	Washington	Active	(Note: Originated as Omega Theta (local), which had formed in 1919.)
**Alpha Beta**	1923	Auburn University	Auburn	Alabama	Active	(Note: Originated as Sigma Beta Delta (local), which had formed in 1921.)
**Chi Gamma**	1923	Marietta College	Marietta	Ohio	Active	(Note: Originated as Alpha Nu Sigma (local), which had formed in 1907.)
**Phi Gamma**	1924	Louisiana State University	Baton Rouge	Louisiana	Active	(Note: Originated as Alpha Alpha Gamma (local), which had formed in 1923.)
Upsilon Gamma	1924–1991	University of South Dakota	Vermillion	South Dakota	Inactive	(Note: Originated as Gamma Sigma Rho (local), which had formed in 1921.)
Tau Gamma	1924–2009	Wittenberg University	Springfield	Ohio	Inactive	(Note: Originated as Kappa Phi Sigma (local), which had formed in 1921.)
Sigma Gamma (Old) (See **Delta Theta**)	1924–1943	Oglethorpe University	Brookhaven	Georgia	Reassigned	(Note: Two chapters have carried the name, Sigma Gamma chapter. The first, at Oglethorpe University originated as Sigma Alpha (local), which had formed in 1921. Several years after it closed in the midst of WWII, the name was re-assigned to a chapter at Davis & Elkins College. When a new group was formed at Oglethorpe, because the chapter's former name was then in use, the 1969-era Oglethorpe chapter was named Delta Theta chapter. This second Oglethorpe group was formed from a colony, which began in 1964.)
**Rho Gamma**	1924	Hillsdale College	Hillsdale	Michigan	Active	
**Pi Gamma**	1925	University of New Mexico	Albuquerque	New Mexico	Active	(Note: Originated as Lambda Mu (local), which had formed in 1922.)
Omicron Gamma	1925–1987	Westminster College	New Wilmington	Pennsylvania	Inactive	(Note: Originated as Phi Theta Pi (local), which had formed in 1922.)
Kappa Gamma	1925–1976	Ohio Wesleyan University	Delaware	Ohio	Inactive	(Note: Originated as Kappa Gamma Chi (local), which had formed in 1890.)
**Xi Gamma**	1926	Michigan State University	East Lansing	Michigan	Active	(Note: Xi Gamma chapter's predecessor group began in 1924.)
Nu Gamma	1926–2014	Pennsylvania State University	University Park	Pennsylvania	Inactive	(Note: Originated as the Alfrost Club (local), which had formed in 1923.)
**Mu Gamma**	1927	Culver–Stockton College	Canton	Missouri	Active	(Note: Originated as Zeta Lambda Sigma (local), which had formed in 1867.)
**Lambda Gamma**	1927–1966, 1977	University of Virginia	Charlottesville	Virginia	Active	(Note: Originated as Theta Sigma Phi (local), which had formed in 1927. At its re-establishment in 1977 it absorbed Omega Chi (local), formed earlier that year.)
**Iota Gamma**	1928	Centenary College	Shreveport	Louisiana	Active	(Note: Originated as Phi Omega (local), which had formed in 1922.)
**Theta Gamma**	1928	Queens University	Charlotte	North Carolina	Active	(Note: Originated as Theta Alpha Pi (local), which had formed in 1926.)
**Eta Gamma**	1928	University of South Carolina	Columbia	South Carolina	Active	(Note: Originated as Chi Omicron Beta (local), which had formed in 1927.)
**Zeta Gamma**	1928	College of Charleston	Charleston	South Carolina	Active	(Note: Originated as Pi Delta Sigma (local), which had formed in 1925.)
Delta Gamma	1928–1970	Denison University	Granville	Ohio	Inactive	
**Epsilon Gamma**	1929	University of Tulsa	Tulsa	Oklahoma	Active	(Note: Originated as Theta Beta Phi (local), which had formed in 1916.)
**Beta Gamma**	1929	University of Louisville	Louisville	Kentucky	Active	(Note: Originated as Beta Sigma (local), which had formed in 1921.)
Alpha Gamma	1930–2009	Utah State University	Logan	Utah	Inactive	(Note: Originated as Sigma Theta Phi (local), which had formed in 1912.)
**Upsilon Beta**	1929	Rollins College	Winter Park	Florida	Active	(Note: Originated as Lambda Phi (local), which had formed in 1925.)
**Psi Delta**	1933	University of Wyoming	Laramie	Wyoming	Active	(Note: Originated as Pi Omega (local), which had formed in 1927.)
**Chi Delta**	1934	Millsaps College	Jackson	Mississippi	Active	(Note: Originated as Tri Chi (local), which had formed in 1933.)
**Phi Delta**	1936	Mississippi State University	Starkville	Mississippi	Active	(Note: Originated as Phi Sigma (local), which had formed in 1933.)
**Upsilon Delta**	1936–1984, 2013	University of Miami	Coral Gables	Florida	Active	(Note: Originated as Zeta Phi (local), which had formed in 1927.)
**Tau Delta**	1937	Gettysburg College	Gettysburg	Pennsylvania	Active	(Note: Originated as Gamma Phi (local), which had formed in 1923.)
Sigma Delta	1938–1961	Lake Forest College (Note: Previously named Lake Forest University, this school changed its name to Lake Forest College in 1965.)	Lake Forest	Illinois	Inactive	(Note: Originated as Gamma Rho Delta (local), which had formed in 1925.)
Rho Delta	1939–1996	University of Texas at El Paso	El Paso	Texas	Inactive	(Note: Originated as Delta Epsilon Beta (local), which had formed in 1933.)
**Pi Delta**	1939	New Mexico State University	Las Cruces	New Mexico	Active	(Note: Originated as the Khelth Samekh Club (local), which had formed in 1925.)
Phi	1940–1996	University of Southern California	Los Angeles	California	Inactive	
Epsilon	1940–1972, 198x ?–1999	SUNY Buffalo	Buffalo	New York	Withdrew	(Note: Originated as Pi Kappa Phi (local), which had formed in 1921. In 1999 the chapter withdrew from ΧΩ to operate as Kappa Phi Epsilon (local), then in 2011 it joined Alpha Sigma Tau to become its Epsilon Mu chapter.)
**Iota Beta**	1941	University of Massachusetts	Amherst	Massachusetts	Active	(Note: Originated as Lambda Delta Mu (local), which had formed in 1931.)
**Psi Gamma**	1943	Mercer University	Macon	Georgia	Active	(Note: Originated as Alpha Chi Epsilon (local), which had formed in 1940.)
Omicron Delta	1944–1993	Carnegie Mellon University	Pittsburgh	Pennsylvania	Inactive	(Note: Originated as Alpha Kappa Psi (local), which had formed in 1910.)
**Xi Delta**	1944	University of Toledo	Toledo	Ohio	Active	(Note: Originated as Kappa Pi Epsilon (local), which had formed in 1912.)
Nu Delta	1945–1972	Willamette University	Salem	Oregon	Inactive	(Note: Originated as Chi Omicron (local), which had formed in 1944.)
**Mu Delta**	1947	Bradley University	Peoria, Illinois	Illinois	Active	(Note: Originated as Delta Kappa (local), which had formed in 1916.)
**Lambda Delta**	1947	Kent State University	Kent	Ohio	Active	(Note: Originated as Kappa Lambda (local), which had formed in 1946.)
**Kappa Delta**	1947	Bowling Green State University	Bowling Green	Ohio	Active	(Note: Originated as Lambda Lambda Lambda (local), which had formed in 1945.)
Sigma Gamma	1948–1984	Davis & Elkins College	Elkins	West Virginia	Inactive	(Note: Originated as Phi Sigma Theta (local), which had formed in 1919.)
Iota Delta	1948–1995	San Jose State University	San Jose	California	Inactive	(Note: Originated as Phi Sigma Theta (local), which had formed in 1919.)
**Theta Delta**	1948–	Carroll University	Waukesha	Wisconsin	Active	(Note: Originated as Kappa Gamma Phi (local), which had formed in 1912.)
**Eta Delta**	1948	University of Florida	Gainesville	Florida	Active	
**Zeta Delta**	1949	University of Nebraska-Omaha	Omaha	Nebraska	Active	(Note: Originated as Pi Omega Pi (local), which had formed in 1922.)
**Epsilon Delta**	1949	University of Southern Mississippi	Hattiesburg	Mississippi	Active	(Note: Originated as Mu Omega (local), which had formed in 1937.)
**Alpha Delta**	1949	Indiana State University	Terre Haute	Indiana	Active	(Note: Originated as Alpha (local), which had formed in 1889.)
Delta Delta	1950–1994	University of California	Santa Barbara	California	Inactive	(Note: Originated as Phi Kappa Gamma (local), which had formed in 1925.)
Gamma Delta	1950–1994, 2024	San Diego State University	San Diego	California	Active	(Note: Originated as the Shyo Club (local), which had formed in 1921.)
**Beta Delta**	1950	Thiel College	Greenville	Pennsylvania	Active	(Note: Originated as Sigma Theta Phi (local), which had formed in 1916.)
**Psi Epsilon**	1951	Arizona State University	Phoenix	Arizona	Active	(Note: Originated as Phi Kappa Delta (local), which had formed in 1912.)
**Chi Epsilon**	1951	University of Evansville	Evansville	Indiana	Active	(Note: Originated as Gamma Epsilon Sigma (local), which had formed in 1854.)
**Phi Epsilon**	1952	Ball State University	Muncie	Indiana	Active	(Note: Originated as Psi Theta (local), which had formed in 1925.)
**Alpha Alpha**	1953	University of North Texas	Denton	Texas	Active	(Note: Originated as Kappa Theta Pi (local), which had formed in 1939.)
Tau Epsilon	1953–1982	University of Puget Sound	Tacoma	Washington	Inactive	(Note: Originated as Delta Alpha Gamma (local), which had formed in 1921.)
**Sigma Epsilon**	1954	Vanderbilt University	Nashville	Tennessee	Active	(Note: Originated as The Ivy Club (local), which had formed in 1952.)
**Rho Epsilon**	1955	Texas Christian University	Fort Worth	Texas	Active	
**Pi Epsilon**	1955	Roanoke College	Salem	Virginia	Active	(Note: Originated as Chi Delta Delta (local), which had formed in 1944.)
**Psi Zeta**	1956	University of Houston	Houston	Texas	Active	(Note: Originated as Beta Chi (local), which had formed in 1941.)
**Chi Zeta**	1957	Colorado State University	Fort Collins	Colorado	Active	
**Phi Zeta**	1958	McNeese State University	Lake Charles	Louisiana	Active	(Note: Originated as Alpha Zeta Phi (local), which had formed in 1951.)
**Upsilon Zeta**	1959	West Texas A&M University	Canyon	Texas	Active	(Note: Originated as Gamma Phi (local), which had formed in 1936.)
Tau Zeta	1959–1991	Emory University	Atlanta	Georgia	Inactive	(Note: Originated as Pi Sigma (local), which had formed in 1953.)
**Sigma Zeta**	1959	East Texas A&M University	Commerce	Texas	Active	(Note: Originated as the Marpesa Club (local), which had formed in 1935.) (Note: Texas A&M University at Commerce changed its name to East Texas A&M University on 7 November 2024.)
**Rho Zeta**	1960	East Carolina University	Greenville	North Carolina	Active	(Note: Originated as Kappa Delta Kappa (local), which had formed in 1959.)
**Pi Zeta**	1960	Western Michigan University	Kalamazoo	Michigan	Active	
**Omicron Zeta**	1961	Arkansas State University	Jonesboro	Arkansas	Active	
**Xi Zeta**	1961	University of Tennessee at Martin	Martin	Tennessee	Active	
**Nu Zeta**	1961	Emporia State University	Emporia	Kansas	Active	(Note: Originated as Omega Chi (local), which had formed in 1960.)
**Mu Zeta**	1961	Adrian College	Adrian	Michigan	Active	(Note: Originated as Delta Pi Theta (local), which had formed in 1954.)
**Lambda Zeta**	1961	University of Missouri–Kansas City	Kansas City	Missouri	Active	(Note: Originated as the Chi Chin Club (local), which had formed in 1953.)
**Kappa Zeta**	1962	Texas Tech University	Lubbock	Texas	Active	
**Theta Zeta**	1962	Eastern New Mexico University	Portales	New Mexico	Active	
Iota Zeta	1962–April 27, 2009	University of Nebraska at Kearney	Kearney	Nebraska	Inactive	(Note: Originated as Delta Pi Beta (local), which had formed in 1911.)
Eta Zeta	1963–2000	Brenau University	Gainesville	Georgia	Inactive	
**Zeta Zeta**	1963	Samford University	Homewood	Alabama	Active	
**Epsilon Zeta**	1963	Stephen F. Austin State University	Nacogdoches	Texas	Active	(Note: Originated as the Pine Burrs Club (local), formed in 1929.)
**Gamma Zeta**	1964	University of Arkansas at Little Rock	Little Rock	Arkansas	Active	
Beta Zeta	1964–1981	Chadron State College	Chadron	Nebraska	Inactive	(Note: Originated as Zeta Alpha (local), which had formed in 1915.)
**Alpha Zeta**	1964	Texas State University	San Marcos	Texas	Active	(Note: Originated as Theta Psi Delta (local), which had formed in 1903.)
Psi Theta	1964–2002	Old Dominion University	Norfolk	Virginia	Inactive	(Note: Originated as Gamma Gamma (local), which had formed in 1938.)
**Phi Theta**	1964	East Central University	Ada	Oklahoma	Active	(Note: Originated as Pi Kappa Epsilon (local), which had formed in 1956.)
Upsilon Theta	1964–1985	Texas A&M University–Kingsville	Kingsville	Texas	Inactive	(Note: Originated as Beta Gamma (local), which had formed in 1931.)
**Chi Theta**	1965	Western Kentucky University	Bowling Green	Kentucky	Active	(Note: Originated as Beta Theta Chi (local), which had formed in 1935.)
**Tau Theta**	1965	William Woods University	Fulton	Missouri	Active	
Sigma Theta	1965–2000	Sam Houston State University	Huntsville	Texas	Inactive	
Rho Theta	1966–1980	University of Wisconsin–Oshkosh	Oshkosh	Wisconsin	Inactive	(Note: Originated as Lambda Chi (local), which had formed in 1923.)
Pi Theta	1966–1973	Eastern Washington University	Cheney	Washington	Inactive	(Note: Originated as Kappa Theta Chi (local), which had formed in 1963.)
**Omicron Theta**	1966	Midwestern State University	Wichita Falls	Texas	Active	
**Nu Theta**	1966	West Liberty University	West Liberty	West Virginia	Active	(Note: Originated as Lambda Phi Epsilon (local), which had formed in 1938.)
**Xi Theta**	1967	South Dakota State University	Brookings	South Dakota	Active	
Mu Theta	1967–1991	University of Louisiana	Lafayette	Louisiana	Inactive	
Lambda Theta	1967–1997	University of Akron	Akron	Ohio	Inactive	
Kappa Theta	1967–1985	Northern Illinois University	DeKalb	Illinois	Inactive	(Note: Originated as Alpha Eta (local), which had formed in 1965.)
Iota Theta	1968–1982	Northern Michigan University	Marquette	Michigan	Inactive	
**Theta Theta**	1968	University of South Florida	Tampa	Florida	Active	(Note: Originated as Phi Gamma Chi (local), which had formed in 1967.)
**Delta Theta** (See Sigma Gamma (Old))	1969	Oglethorpe University	Brookhaven	Georgia	Active	
**Zeta Theta**	1969	Middle Tennessee State University	Murfreesboro	Tennessee	Active	(Note: Originated as Delta Pi Delta (local), which had formed in 1966.)
**Epsilon Theta**	1969	Morehead State University	Morehead	Kentucky	Active	(Note: Originated as Theta Sigma Tau (local), which had formed in 1967.)
**Gamma Theta**	1969	Eastern Kentucky University	Richmond	Kentucky	Active	(Note: Originated as Lambda Phi Omega (local), which had formed in 1966.)
**Beta Theta**	1969	University of South Alabama	Mobile	Alabama	Active	(Note: Originated as a colony, which had formed in 1968.)
Alpha Theta	1969–1983	Wayne State College	DeKalb	Illinois	Inactive	(Note: Originated as Pi Alpha Lambda (local), which had formed in 1967.)
**Psi Kappa**	1970	Clemson University	Clemson	South Carolina	Active	(Note: Originated as Sigma Beta Chi (local), which had formed in 1963.)
**Chi Kappa**	1970	George Mason University	Fairfax	Virginia	Active	(Note: Originated as Lambda Tau Omega (local), which had formed in 1967.)
**Phi Kappa**	1971	University of West Georgia	Carrollton	Georgia	Active	(Note: Originated as Phi Delta (local), which had formed in 1968.)
**Tau Kappa**	1971	University of Montevallo	Montevallo	Alabama	Active	(Note: Originated as Omega Tau Omega (local), which had formed in 196x (?))
**Sigma Kappa**	1972	Austin Peay State University	Clarksville	Tennessee	Active	(Note: Originated as Sigma Tau Omega (local), which had formed in 1968.)
**Rho Kappa**	1974	Illinois State University	Normal	Illinois	Active	(Note: Originated as Tau Delta Chi (local), which had formed in 19xx (?))
**Pi Kappa**	1974	Appalachian State University	Boone	North Carolina	Active	(Note: Originated as Omega Chi Omega (local), which had formed in 1973.)
**Omicron Kappa**	1975	University of California, Davis	Davis	California	Active	
**Xi Kappa**	1975	Texas A&M University	College Station	Texas	Active	
**Nu Kappa**	1976–1994, 2016	Georgia Southern University	Statesboro	Georgia	Active	
**Mu Kappa**	1976	Duke University	Durham	North Carolina	Active	
**Lambda Kappa**	1976	Huntingdon College	Montgomery	Alabama	Active	
Kappa Kappa	1977–200x ?	University of Alabama in Huntsville	Huntsville	Alabama	Inactive	
**Iota Kappa**	1977	Troy University	Troy	Alabama	Active	
**Theta Kappa**	1977	Baylor University	Waco	Texas	Active	(Note: Originated as Pi Alpha Lambda (local), which had formed in 1940.)
**Eta Kappa**	1979	Missouri University of Science and Technology	Rolla	Missouri	Active	(Note: Originated as Sigma Chi Omega (local), which had formed in 1978.)
**Epsilon Kappa**	1981	St. Lawrence University	Canton	New York	Active	
**Zeta Kappa**	1981	University of North Carolina	Greensboro	North Carolina	Active	
**Delta Kappa**	1982	University of North Carolina	Charlotte	North Carolina	Active	
**Beta Kappa**	1983	California State Polytechnic University	Pomona	California	Active	
**Gamma Kappa**	1983	Western Illinois University	Macomb	Illinois	Active	
**Alpha Kappa**	1984	North Carolina State University	Raleigh	North Carolina	Active	
**Psi Lambda**	1984	Valdosta State University	Valdosta	Georgia	Active	
**Chi Lambda**	1985	Winthrop University	Rock Hill	South Carolina	Active	
**Phi Lambda**	1987	Franklin & Marshall College	Lancaster	Pennsylvania	Active	(Note: Originated as the Third Edition Club (local), which had formed in 1986.)
**Sigma Lambda**	1987	Virginia Tech	Blacksburg	Virginia	Active	
Tau Lambda	1987–1988	University of Richmond	Richmond	Virginia	Inactive	
**Upsilon Lambda**	1987	Hanover College	Hanover	Indiana	Active	
Pi Lambda	1988–1992	Centre College	Danville	Kentucky	Inactive	
**Rho Lambda**	1988	University of Delaware	Newark	Delaware	Active	
Omicron Lambda	1989–2024	Birmingham–Southern College	Birmingham	Alabama	Inactive	
**Xi Lambda**	1989	Washington And Lee University	Lexington	Virginia	Active	
**Mu Lambda**	1990	University of Dayton	Dayton	Ohio	Active	(Note: Originated as Sigma Tau Epsilon (local), which had formed in 1983.)
**Nu Lambda**	1990	University of North Carolina	Wilmington	North Carolina	Active	(Note: Originated as Xi Delta Phi (local), which had formed in 19xx ?)
**Iota Lambda**	1991	Villanova University	Villanova	Pennsylvania	Active	
**Kappa Lambda**	1991	University of California	San Diego	California	Active	
**Eta Lambda**	1993	American University	Washington	D.C.	Active	
**Theta Lambda**	1993	Wingate University	Wingate	North Carolina	Active	
**Zeta Lambda**	1994	Wake Forest University	Winston-Salem	North Carolina	Active	(Note: Originated as the Fidele Society (local), which had formed in 1961.)
**Epsilon Lambda**	1994	Furman University	Greenville	South Carolina	Active	(Note: Originated as the Chios Society (local), which had formed in 1984.)
**Beta Lambda**	1996	Carthage College	Kenosha	Wisconsin	Active	(Note: Originated as Kappa Chi Omega (local), which had formed in 1965.)
**Gamma Lambda**	1996	Rose–Hulman Institute of Technology	Terre Haute	Indiana	Active	(Note: Originated as The Rookies Club, which had formed in 1995.)
**Delta Lambda**	1996	Northern Arizona University	Flagstaff	Arizona	Active	
**Psi Mu**	1998	University of Central Florida	Orange County	Florida	Active	
**Alpha Lambda**	1998	Valparaiso University	Valparaiso	Indiana	Active	(Note: Originated as Chi Sigma Xi (local), which had formed in 1919.)
**Chi Mu**	2000	Bucknell University	Lewisburg	Pennsylvania	Active	(Note: Originated as Kappa Chi Delta (local), which had formed in 1998.)
Phi Mu	2000–2005	Lehigh University	Bethlehem	Pennsylvania	Inactive	
**Upsilon Mu**	2001	John Carroll University	University Heights	Ohio	Active	(Note: Originated as Delta Delta Xi (local).)
**Tau Mu**	2003	Washington University	St. Louis	Missouri	Active	
**Sigma Mu**	2005	Babson College	Wellesley	Massachusetts	Active	
**Rho Mu**	2007	DePaul University	Chicago	Illinois	Active	
**Pi Mu**	2007	Florida Gulf Coast University	Lee County	Florida	Active	
**Omicron Mu**	2008	California Polytechnic State University	San Luis Obispo	California	Active	
**Lambda Mu**	2011	Loyola University	Chicago	Illinois	Active	
**Xi Mu**	2011	University of Rochester	Rochester	New York	Active	
**Kappa Mu**	2011	Sacred Heart University	Fairfield	Connecticut	Active	
**Iota Mu**	2014	Quinnipiac University	Hamden	Connecticut	Active	
**Zeta Mu**	February 28, 2014	University of Denver	Denver	Colorado	Active	
**Theta Mu**	2014	Worcester Polytechnic Institute	Worcester	Massachusetts	Active	
**Epsilon Mu**	2016	Northeastern University	Boston	Massachusetts	Active	
**Gamma Mu**	2017	Coastal Carolina University	Conway	South Carolina	Active	
