= Business and Professional Women =

Business and Professional Women may refer to:

- Business and Professional Women's Foundation
- International Federation of Business and Professional Women
- Women in business
