= Mary Margaret McBride =

American writer and radio host (1899–1976)

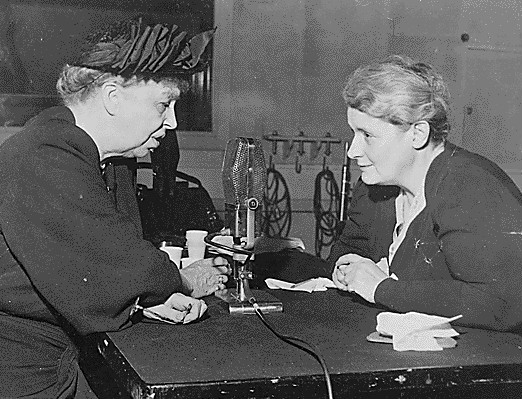
- Eleanor Roosevelt and McBride
- Born: November 16, 1899; Paris, Missouri, U.S.
- Died: April 7, 1976 (aged 76); West Shokan, New York, U.S.
- Presenting career
- Stations: WOR (AM); WGHQ
- Network: CBS; ABC; NBC

Mary Margaret McBride (November 16, 1899 – April 7, 1976) was an American radio interview host and writer. Her popular radio shows spanned more than 40 years. In the 1940s, the daily audience for her housewife-oriented program numbered from six to eight million listeners. She was called "the First Lady of Radio".

== Early life ==
McBride was born on November 16, 1899, in Paris, Missouri, to a farming family. Their frequent relocations disorganized her early schooling, but at the age of six, she became a student at a preparatory school called William Woods College, and at 16 the University of Missouri, receiving a degree in journalism there in 1919. She was a member of Kappa Alpha Theta at the University of Missouri.

She worked a year as a reporter at the Cleveland Press, and then until 1924 at the New York Evening Mail. Following this, she wrote freelance for periodicals including The Saturday Evening Post, Cosmopolitan, and Good Housekeeping, and starting in 1926, collaborated in writing travel-oriented books.

== Radio and sidelines ==
=== As Martha Deane ===
McBride first worked steadily in radio for WOR in New York City, starting in 1934. This daily women's-advice show, with her persona as "Martha Deane", a kind and witty grandmother figure with a Missouri drawl, aired daily until 1940.

Originally, McBride's character "Martha Deane" was to be a grandmother with six children and many grandchildren-all imaginary. They were all named and described; she was to memorize the details. Her job was to talk colloquially and dispense philosophy. She kept getting all her "grandchildren's" names mixed up and within three weeks, she jettisoned the whole tribe on air. She remained Martha Deane, but was no longer a grandmother.

Concurrently with working as "Deane", in 1934 and 1935, she was the women's page editor for the Newspaper Enterprise Association syndicate.

=== As herself ===
In 1937, she launched on the CBS radio network the first of a series of similar and successful shows, now as Mary Margaret McBride. She had to abandon the Deane persona because WOR owned the name and had replaced her in 1940 with Bessie Beatty.

She interviewed figures well known in the world of arts and entertainment and politics, with a style recognized as original to herself. She accepted advertising only for products she was prepared to endorse from her own experience, and turned down all tobacco or alcohol products.

She followed this format in regular broadcasts on:

- CBS until 1941
- NBC (where her audience numbered in the millions) from then until 1950
- ABC from then until 1954
- NBC again until 1960, and
- The New York Herald Tribune's radio broadcasts with a wider audience via syndication.

Her NBC show in the 1940s had broad range of guests, from politicians to generals to movie stars; she never announced her guests in advance, so the audience tuned in with no idea who they would get. Beginning during World War II, she began "breaking the color line", mixing in African American guests. McBride was a popular media figure; the tea rose, 'Mary Margaret McBride' was named for her.

In September 1948, NBC brought McBride to television for a 30-minute primetime show on Tuesdays at 9 pm EST, but abandoned the show in its partial third month, with Variety describing the attempt sarcastically, and The New York Times calling her the first major "fatality" of this kind.

Below is a review of one of her first television performances, reviewed by The New York Times:

Perhaps the ladies in the daytime can survive Miss McBride's effusive and interminable commercials, but for the men at home in the evening they are hard to take after a day at the office. To watch Miss McBride shift-without pause or loss of breath-from a eulogy of Kemtone paint to an analysis of Russia is an ordeal not quickly forgotten. If nighttime television is to be daytime radio, away video, away!

From 1953 to 1956, she also conducted a syndicated newspaper column for the Associated Press.

About 20 years apart, she wrote two books for girls, each with "Elizabeth" in the title.

As time went on, she appeared in smaller radio media markets, in upstate New York, and toward the end of her life hosted Your Hudson Valley Neighbor three times a week on WGHQ Kingston, New York, from the living room of her home. Her longtime companion and business partner, Stella Karn, died in 1957.

She died at the age of 76 on April 7, 1976, at her home in West Shokan, New York. McBride's ashes were placed in her former rose garden. She has a star on the Hollywood Walk of Fame for her work in radio.

== Cultural impact ==
An account of her career, It's One O'clock and Here is Mary Margaret McBride: A Radio Biography by Susan Ware was published in early 2005. She is also discussed in depth in Radio Voices by Michele Hilmes.

Bob and Ray's character of Mary McGoon (originally called Mary Margaret McGoon) is a parody of Mary Margaret McBride. On Bob and Ray's long-running radio show (which ran from the 1940s through the 1980s), McGoon would cheerfully give out odd or impractical recipes for such bizarre items as "Frozen Ginger Ale Salad", which necessitated getting chocolate bars with walnuts in them and then removing all the walnuts to put in the salad. McGoon was voiced by Goulding. Using the artist name of Mary McGoon, the duo issued the 1949 novelty single "Mule Train" b/w "I'd Like To Be A Cow In Switzerland" which was heard frequently on Dr. Demento's radio show in the 1970s through the early 2000s.

The TV host Molly Margaret McSnide in Fantastic Four issue 16 is an obvious reference to her.

Her name was spoofed on the classic CBS-TV sitcom I Love Lucy in episode 79, "The Million Dollar Idea", which aired on January 11, 1954. In that installment, Lucy (Lucille Ball) comes up with an ambitious idea to make money. She decides to appear on television selling her Aunt Martha's salad dressing. Assisting her on the program is her best friend Ethel Mertz (Vivian Vance) as Mary Margaret McMertz.

McBride's celebrity was hardly a secret confined to daytime radio listeners, either; her 15th-anniversary celebration in 1949 was held in Yankee Stadium, the only facility large enough to hold the 75,000 people who filled every seat and formed huge crowds outside. Her magazine show was on the air continuously for 25 years.

McBride pioneered a style of ad-libbing her radio shows, meaning that the content in her show was not rehearsed prior to going on the air. She was acknowledged by Current Biography as "the first woman to bring newspaper technique to radio interviewing and to make daytime broadcasts profitable." The method of sustaining her show was also distinct. McBride and manager Stella Karn would produce their show and then market it directly to sponsors in the New York area or broader national arena. This format allowed McBride and Karn to have complete agency over the content and format of the show. The two were consistently able to maintain a level of support from sponsors, meaning that they were able to produce content that was exactly how they envisioned it, free of outside changes. This model was also one of McBride's notable contributions to broadcasting, as it paved the way for independent producing.

== Personal relationship ==
Mary Margaret McBride and Stella Karn met in the early 1920s in an instance of complete happenstance. As McBride describes it, “One day a bouncy woman, with eager brown eyes and auburn hair rolled into a bun, burst into our office and announced that she would be handling publicity for us.” McBride and Karn worked together for years, with Karn managing McBride and her show. McBride described the two of them in a Reader's Digest edition in 1962 as, "No two people were more unlike. My reaction to a crisis was to dissolve into tears; Stella's was to charge into battle." The two moved in together in a small apartment in the Chelsea neighborhood of New York City. McBride and Karn relied on each other for the entirety of their professional and personal lives.

McBride describes their first endeavor as a complete gamble motivated solely by Karn's optimism. During the Great Depression, the opportunity came for McBride to audition for a radio show, one of the only sources of entertainment at the time. When McBride got the job, she immediately recommended Karn as the person to handle the business side of the show's affairs. Karn and McBride became business partners, and Karn's first act on the job was to give her partner a raise.

McBride and Karn made a name for themselves as pioneers in the field of broadcasting, and also as trailblazers for the future of lesbian and bisexual journalists. McBride and Karn established their show as a connection point for lesbian and bisexual female creatives, forging friendships with influential names in broadcasting such as Ann Batchelder and Lisa Sergio.

== Bibliography ==
- Jazz (with Paul Whiteman), 1926
- Charm (with Alexander Williams), 1927
- Paris Is a Woman's Town (with Helen Josephy), 1929
- London Is a Man's Town [But Women Go There] (with Josephy), 1930
- New York Is Everybody's Town (with Josephy), 1931
- Beer and Skittles: A Friendly Guide to Modern Germany (with Josephy), 1932
- Tune in for Elizabeth, 1945
- Mary Margaret McBride's Harvest of American Cooking, 1957
- The Growing Up of Mary Elizabeth, 1966
- Two autobiographical works
