= Gladys H. Lent-Barndollar =

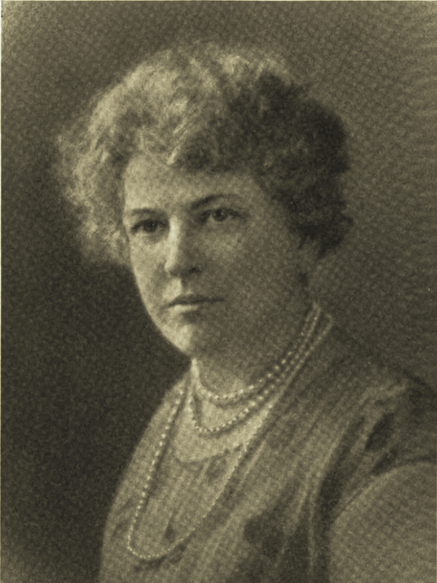
- Gladys H. Lent-Barndollar, in a 1926 publication.
- Born: Gladys Hortense O'Harra ca. 1872; Oswego, New York
- Died: August 5, 1938; Oakland, California, U.S.
- Occupations: businesswoman; clubwoman
- Organization(s): President, National Federation of Business and Professional Women's Clubs
- Known for: Pioneer, direct mail advertising
- Spouses: Benjamin F. Lent; Charles K. Barndollar (m. 1912)
- Children: 1

Signature
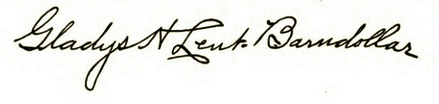

Gladys H. Lent-Barndollar (née O'Harra; after first marriage, Lent; after second marriage, Lent-Barndollar; ca. 1872 - 1938) was an American business executive and clubwoman. In Colorado, she was the state's first court reporter. in California, she was the first woman handwriting expert ever to testify in the Alameda County Superior Court.

Lent-Barndollar was a pioneer in the direct mail advertising field. In Oakland, California, she conducted the Multigraph Letter Company, a large direct-by-mail business with headquarters on the seventh floor of the Tribune Tower.

She served as President of the National Federation of Business and Professional Women's Clubs. She was the first woman director of Oakland Advertising Club; founder and president, Oakland Business and Professional Women's Club; director, Oakland Women's City Club; president and director, Oakland Soroptimist Club; and founder and first president, Women's Auxiliary of the Oakland Chamber of Commerce.

== Early life and education ==
Gladys Hortense O'Harra, was born in Oswego, New York, ca. 1872. Her parents were David Saulsbury and Mary Elizabeth (Tracy) O'Harra. The family that was founded in the U.S. in the Colonial era, her maternal great-grandfather having been a patriot soldier and officer of the Continental Army in the American Revolutionary War and her maternal grandfather having served as an officer in the civil war. Ancestors of Lent-Barndollar became pioneers in Ohio at a time when that state was a frontier region.

Lent-Barndollar gained her early education largely in the public schools at Scriba, New York, and through self-application, broad travel and comprehensive reading and study, she rounded out a liberal education, besides having developed a musical talent and gained a reputation as a concert and church singer.

She was left a widow within two years after her marriage to Benjamin F. Lent, of Syracuse, New York, and her circumstances were such that she then found it necessary to provide financial support for herself and her infant daughter. In preparation for this responsibility, she completed a course in the Caton Business College in Buffalo, New York, graduating with honors.

== Career ==
She was given a position in the offices of one of the leading law firms of that city. There, she continued her effective services until she found it necessary to seek a change of location for the benefit of her health and that of her daughter. She proceeded to Colorado, and her ability as a stenographer and executive there gained for her the position of court reporter for the District Court in the southern part of the state. She graduated from a college in this state.

In 1906, Lent-Barndollar came to California, opening an office in Los Angeles where she worked as a public stenographer. She left for San Francisco within a few months and opened an advertising business office in the Monadnock Building before the debris from the 1906 San Francisco earthquake had been cleared away. She later opened branch offices in Los Angeles and Oakland, California. She disposed of her business in Los Angeles and San Francisco when she established her permanent residence in Oakland in 1911, where she was prosperous in her business activities and also gained prominence in social, cultural, civic and business circles.

In 1915, after meeting many business women at the Panama–Pacific International Exposition and conferring with them concerning their varied activities, Lent-Barndollar decided to establish in Oakland a business woman's club, and her efforts along this line led to the formation of the Woman's Bureau of the Oakland Chamber of Commerce. She became the first president of this bureau, which within a period of two years, was merged into the Business and Professional Women's Club of Oakland, she having served two years as president of this club.

During World War I, Lent-Barndollar worked in connection with the various areas of patriotic service in Alameda County. She served under Herbert Hoover as the chair of the county's women's food conservation committee.

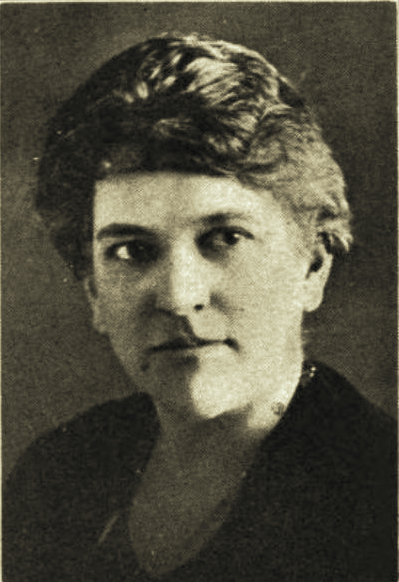
Lent-Barndollar in a 1925 publication.

In 1924, she was the first woman to be elected a director of the Oakland Advertising Club, with which she became identified at the time of its organization. She was re-elected to the board of the Advertising Club, and also served as secretary-treasurer.

She was the first woman handwriting expert to testify in the Alameda County Superior Court. She was sent as a delegate to the convention of the federation of Business and Professional Women's Clubs at Chattanooga, Tennessee, and in 1925, she was a delegate to the convention held in Portland, Maine.

Lent-Barndollar was well known as a public speaker along both business and civic lines. She was influential also in the organization of the Soroptimist Club of Alameda County, California, serving as president in 1930, and a member of the board of directors for two years. She gave two years of service as a director of the local Business and Professional Women's Club.

During her residence in California, she was prominent in cultural affairs, especially along musical lines. She traveled extensively, especially in concert work. As a vocalist, she held choir positions in several large churches in various cities in the U.S.

== Personal life ==
Widowed after only two years, she married Benjamin F. Lent in 1891, they had one child, a daughter, Myrtle Hope Lent-Holtzmann (born 1892). Her second marriage was to Charles K. Barndollar in 1912.

Ill for almost two years, Gladys Lent-Barndollar died in Oakland, California, on August 5, 1938.
