= Lena Madesin Phillips =

American lawyer, writer, and clubwoman

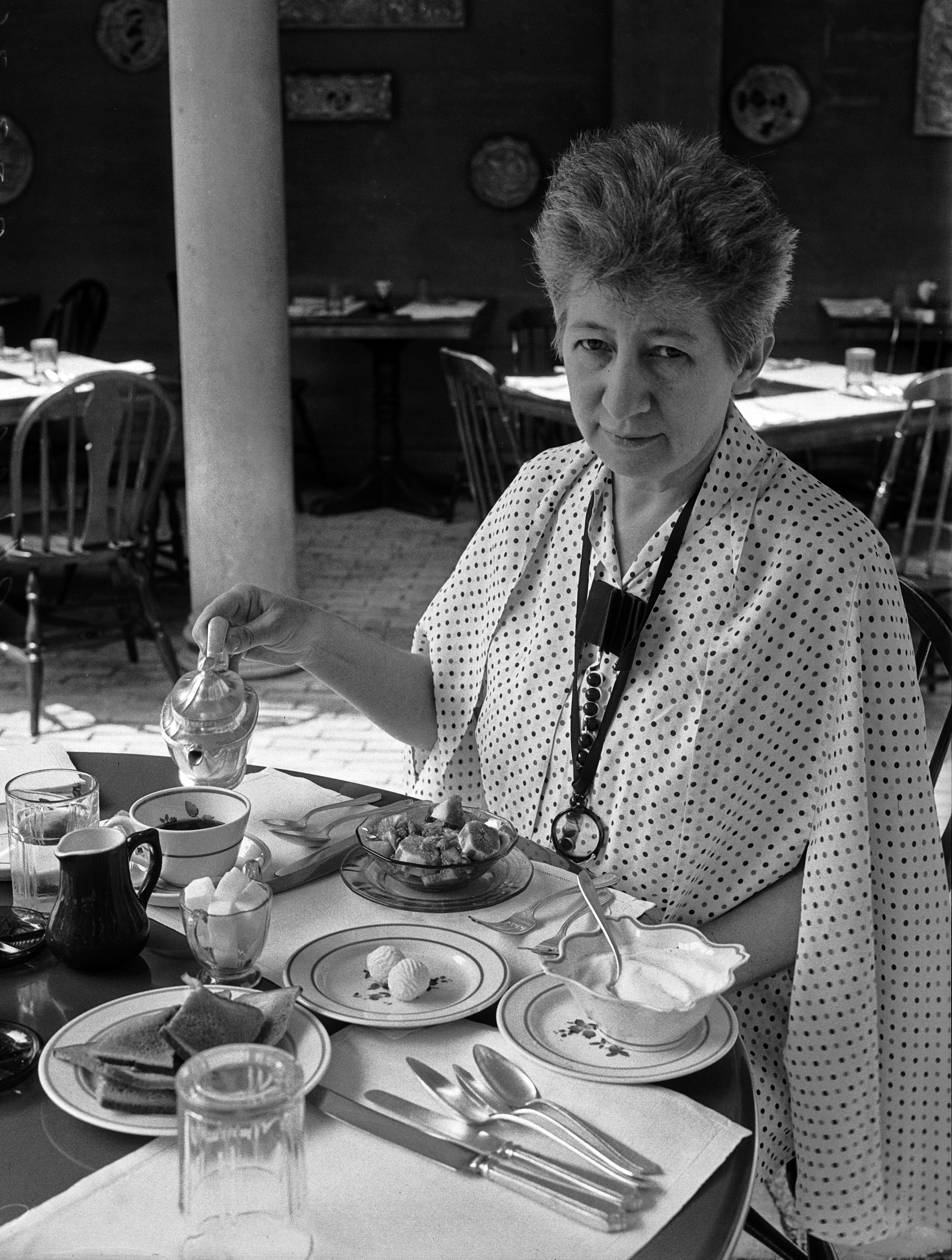
- Phillips in 1935
- Born: Anna Lena Phillips; September 15, 1881; Nicholasville, Kentucky, United States
- Died: May 22, 1955 (aged 73); Marseille, France
- Occupations: American lawyer and clubwoman
- Known for: Founder of both the National and the International Federation of Business and Professional Women's Clubs
- Parent(s): Alice (Shook) Phillips and Judge William Henry Phillips

Lena Madesin Phillips (September 15, 1881 – May 22, 1955) was a lawyer and clubwoman from Nicholasville, Kentucky, who founded the National Business and Professional Women's Clubs in 1919.

She enlarged her circle, traveling also to Europe, and in 1930 she founded the International Federation of Business and Professional Women. Phillips served years as a president of each organization, and continued to work as an activist to the end of her life. She wrote numerous articles and pamphlets in the service of these causes, as well as frequently speaking to both women's and men's groups. Phillips also worked on two journals: Independent Women of NBPW, and the Pictorial Review.

== Background and early life ==
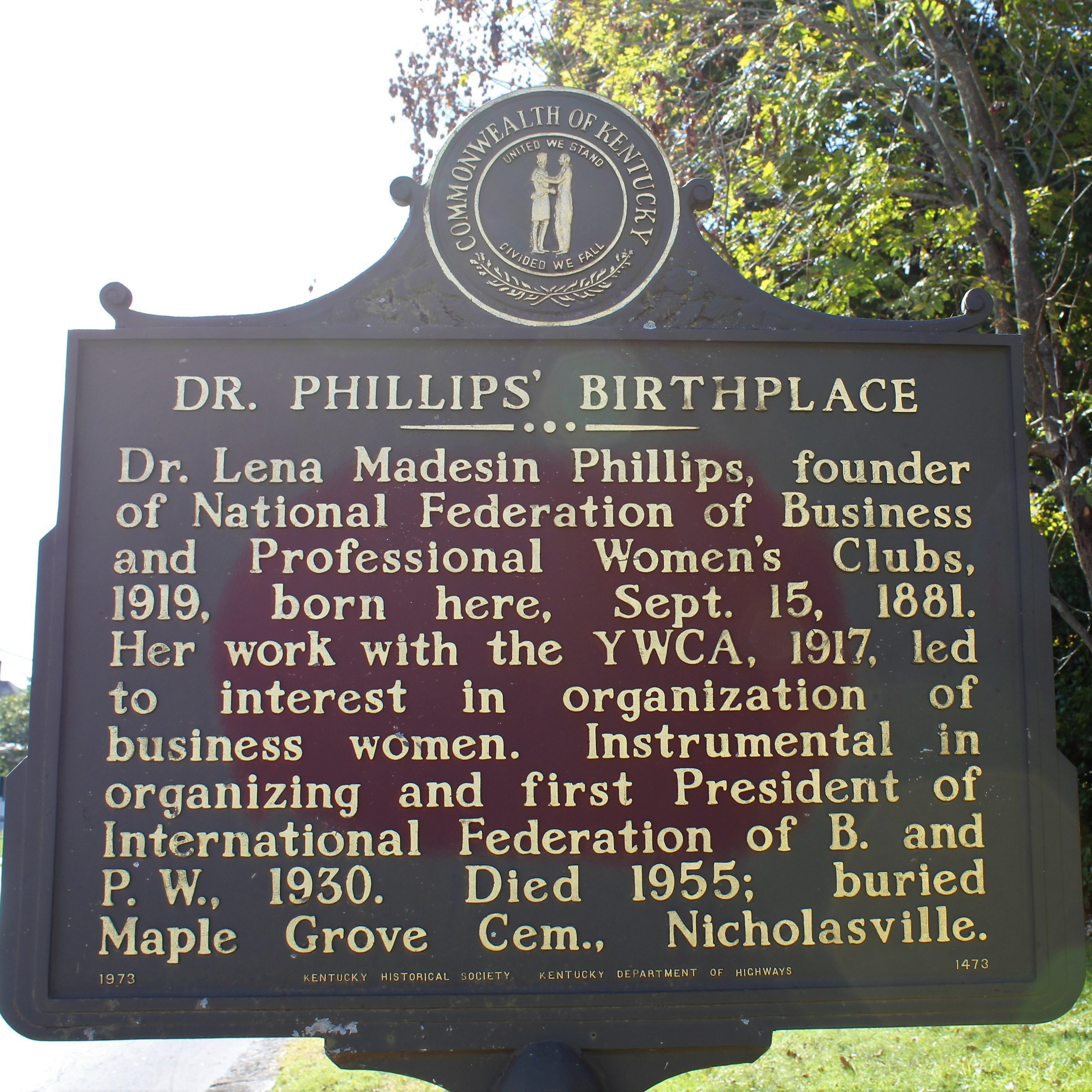
Historical marker at the birthplace of Lena Madesin Phillips in Nicholasville, Kentucky.

Anna Lena Phillips was born on September 15, 1881, in Nicholasville, Kentucky; she was the daughter of Judge William Henry Phillips (1838–1933) and his second wife, Alice Shook, of Jessamine County, Kentucky, whom he married in 1880. Her middle name was in honor of her father's first wife, Selina (also known as Lena). Her half-siblings were George (born 1863), Arthur (born 1866), Florence (born 1868), and Fleming (born 1870). William and Selina's first child died as an infant.

From a young age, Phillips wanted to step outside the normal gender-based roles, and she was eager to gain an education. At age 7 she was enrolled in the Jessamine Female Institute, where she studied every subject offered, including music. When Phillips was 11 years old, she changed her name to "Madesin" (a transliteration of the French médecin) in honor of her oldest brother George, who was studying medicine in Paris, France, and became a doctor. She used Madesin as her name for the rest of her life. Phillips graduated at age 18 from the institute, with a Magna Cum Laude honor.

== College and law career ==
Phillips attended the Woman's College of Baltimore (now called Goucher College), where her studies again included music. At one point she hoped to become a concert pianist. She studied enthusiastically and engaged in extracurricular activities until she became ill from exhaustion. While recovering in Kentucky, she fell and hurt a nerve in her arm. She had to stop playing music for an extended period of time, and drop out of college. She started working at the Jessamine Female Institute, where she had studied as a child, teaching music for $500 a year.

Due to her father's influence and her interest in politics and economics, Phillips soon studied law at the University of Kentucky. She traveled daily the twelve-mile trip to Lexington from Nicholasville. During this time, she helped her father maintain his public image, as judges were elected. She became involved in Jessamine County and Kentucky politics. At the law school, she met with resistance as a female student. But when Phillips completed law school in 1917, she was the first woman to graduate with full honors, and she had the highest marks for her entire law class. She returned to Nicholasville where she opened her own practice.

== Women's organizations ==
=== United States ===
Phillips traveled to New York City in relation to her work as an attorney for the Young Women's Christian Association (YWCA), and her service as secretary for its National War Work Council. With an interest in uniting working women, she began working to unite businesswomen of the United States. She helped lead the National Business Women's Committee to form a permanent organization after the war ended; in July 1919 at a convention in St. Louis, Missouri, she started with them the National Federation of Business and Professional Women's Clubs of the United States (NFBPWC). In 1920, she helped found the federation's journal, Independent Woman.

She studied at New York University for a master's in law degree, completing it in 1923. She entered private practice in New York City. Phillips served as president of the NFBPWC from 1926 to 1929.

The NFBPWC promoted equality for women, especially economic parity with men in the business world. It was also involved in trying to reduce or regulate child labor and support international peace. In 1930, the NFBPWC endorsed the Equal Rights Amendment. To broaden national exposure, Phillips toured the country, giving speeches about the club in such places as Kansas City, Colorado, Santa Fe, New Mexico, and Los Angeles, California. Because she always drove herself in her activism, she sometimes became weakened and exhausted at times during her life.

She frequently published articles and pamphlets on these issues. She spoke to men's groups as well as to women's groups. After leaving her law practice in 1935, Phillips served as a columnist and assistant editor of the Pictorial Review from 1935 to 1939, years of the Great Depression.

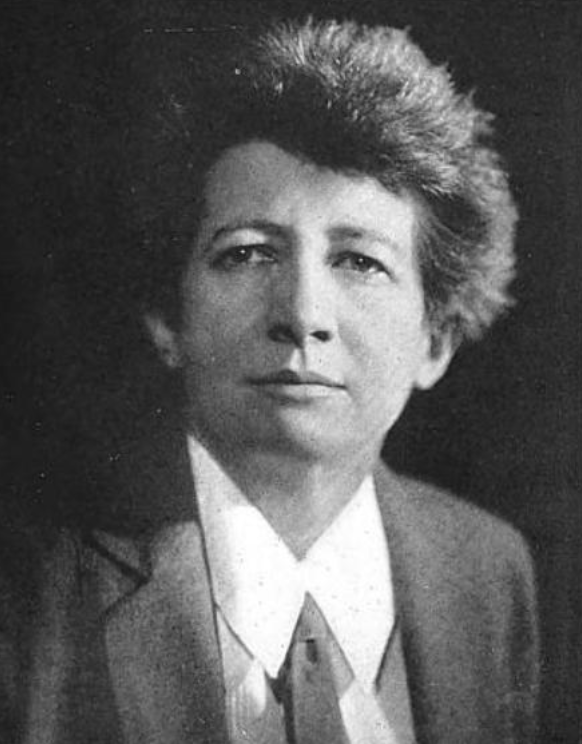
Phillips, from a 1928 publication

=== Internationally ===
Phillips embarked on goodwill tours of Europe in 1928 and 1929 in order to reach an international audience. The first trip that she took with colleagues included stops in England, France, Belgium, the Netherlands, Germany, Switzerland, and Italy to meet with professional business women and discuss starting clubs in their countries. Phillips returned to Geneva, Switzerland, where on August 26, 1930, the International Federation of Business and Professional Women was founded. Lena Madesin Phillips was chosen as the founding president of the IFBPW, which she served as until 1947. Phillips believed that gaining economic equality would enable women to achieve equality in education, social, and political aspects of society. She was quoted saying, " ...if our motive is right, if we have faith, vision and courage, accomplishment must come." In the following decades, Phillips made many trips to Europe on club business until the end of her life in 1955.

== Personal life ==
Phillips had a relationship for 36 years with Marjory Lacey-Baker, an American playwright who she described as "the woman with whom I share my home." They met in 1919. Lacey-Baker was an actress with the Provincetown Players, and also wrote the play In the Light. At that time, Phillips attended a pageant where Lacey-Baker was performing.

According to historian Jacqueline Castledine, Phillips and Lacey-Baker "operated in a world of socially and politically committed women reformers, some also living in a same-sex relationship."

Due to the two women's relationship, biographer Lisa Sergio dedicated her book about Phillips, A Measure Filled (1972), to Lacey-Baker. Lacey-Baker died March 11, 1971.

== Death and legacy ==
Phillips continued to work as an activist until the end of her life. She died in Marseille, France, while on her way to the Middle East for a meeting with Arab women. Her body was returned to Jessamine County, Kentucky, and she was buried at the Maple Grove Cemetery in Nicholasville.

She left an unfinished manuscript for her autobiography. Writer Sergio drew from this for her 1972 biography of the feminist activist. Phillips's collected papers, from 1881 to 1955, are held at the Schlesinger Library, Radcliffe Institute, Harvard University.

A historical highway marker was erected on US 27 south of the city to commemorate Phillips and mark her birthplace.
