= Rosa 'Mary Margaret McBride' =

Rose cultivar

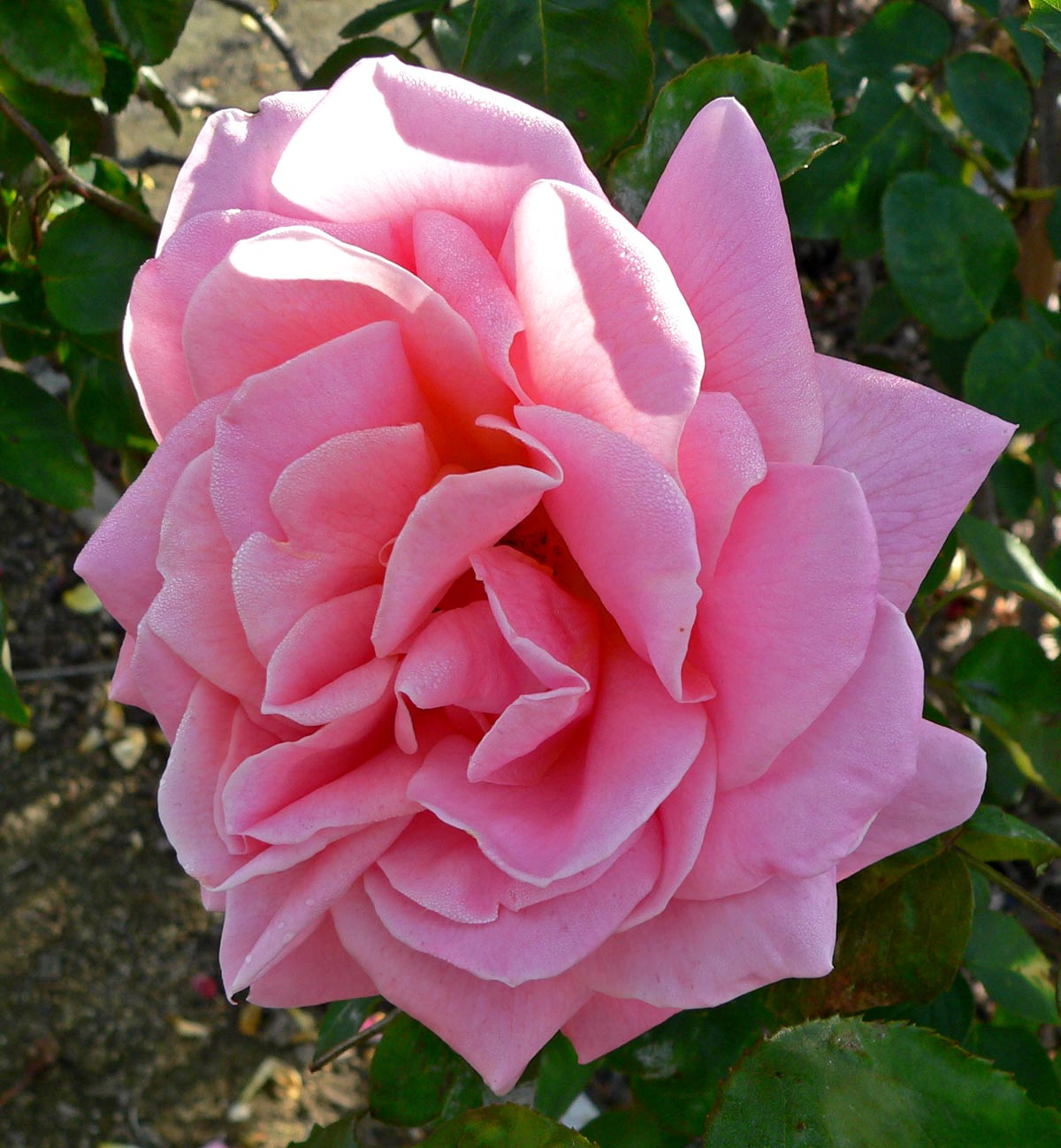
- Genus: Rosa hybrid
- Hybrid parentage: 'Sunkist' × 'Olympiad'
- Cultivar group: Hybrid tea rose
- Marketing names: 'Mary Margaret McBride'
- Breeder: Jean Henri Nicolas
- Origin: United States, 1942

Rosa 'Mary Margaret McBride' is a medium pink Hybrid tea rose named after popular 1940's radio host, Mary Margaret McBride. The rose was developed by Jean Henri Nicolas in 1942. It won an All-America Rose Selections award in 1943.

== History ==
The 'Mary Margaret McBride' rose was named in honor of Mary Margaret McBride (1899–1976), who was a popular American radio interview host from 1937 to 1953, and considered a pioneer in radio broadcasting. "Her listeners were so devoted that on her 10th anniversary in radio, they packed Madison Square Garden for a party in her honor. On her 15th anniversary, fans filled Yankee Stadium".

The rose was bred by Jean Henri (J.H.) Nicolas in 1942, and introduced by Jackson & Perkins in the US in 1943 and in Australia by Hazlewood Bros. Nursery in 1949 as 'Mary Margaret McBride'. Its stock parents are Hybrid tea roses, 'Sunkist' and 'Olympiad'. The cultivar was named an All-America Rose Selections winner in 1943.

== Description ==
'Mary Margaret McBride' is a medium height shrub of upright growth. The plant bears clusters of medium-pink flowers with a strong, sweet fragrance. Blooms are of 4-5 in (10-12 cm) and have 26 to 40 petals.'Mary Margaret McBride' blooms in flushes from spring to fall.

== See also ==
- Garden roses
- Rose Hall of Fame
- List of Award of Garden Merit roses
