= Pictorial Review =

American women's magazine

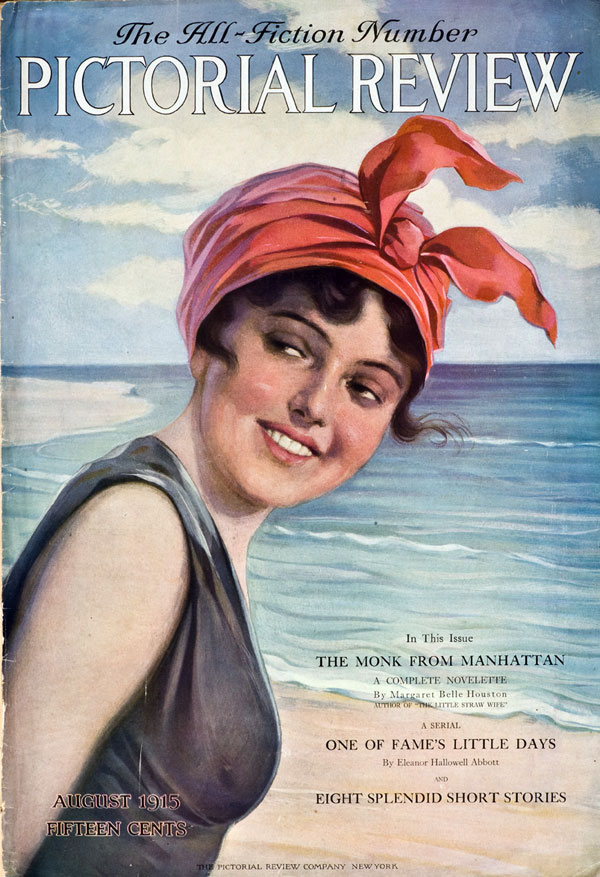
- Categories: Women's magazine
- Frequency: Monthly
- First issue: September 1899
- Final issue: March 1939
- Company: Pictorial Review Company
- Country: United States
- Based in: New York City
- Language: English

The Pictorial Review was an American women's magazine published from 1899 to 1939.

Based in New York, the Pictorial Review was first published in September 1899. The magazine was originally designed to showcase dress patterns of German immigrant William Paul Ahnelt's American Fashion Company. On the title page of Pictorial Review, on each sheet of its letterhead, was a rococo device: a scroll with the numeral "13" and a pencil, surrounded by a wreath. That trademark was adopted by Ahnelt shortly after he founded Pictorial Review. It symbolized the $13 capital with which he started his dress pattern business upon coming to the United States.

The celebrated novel The Age of Innocence (1920), by Edith Wharton, was first published in four episodes in Pictorial Review from July–October 1920 before it appeared as a book on 25 October of that year.

Pictorial Review was published in two languages: English and Spanish. The Spanish edition printed a million four hundred thousand copies. The director of the Spanish edition was Rómulo Manuel de Mora, from Huelva (Spain).

By the late 1920s it was one of the largest of the "women's magazines". In June, 1931 it enjoyed a circulation of 2,540,000.

In 1936, the publisher sold the magazine to its Vice President, Adman George S. Fowler. In 1937 it merged with The Delineator, another women's magazine. However, two years later it ceased publication. From 1935 to 1939, activist and feminist Lena Madesin Phillips served as an associate editor.

== Monthly covers ==
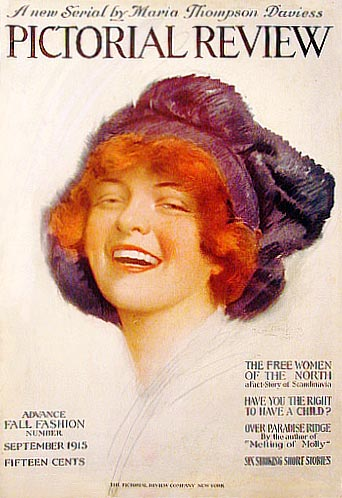
Pictorial Review 1915-09 cover

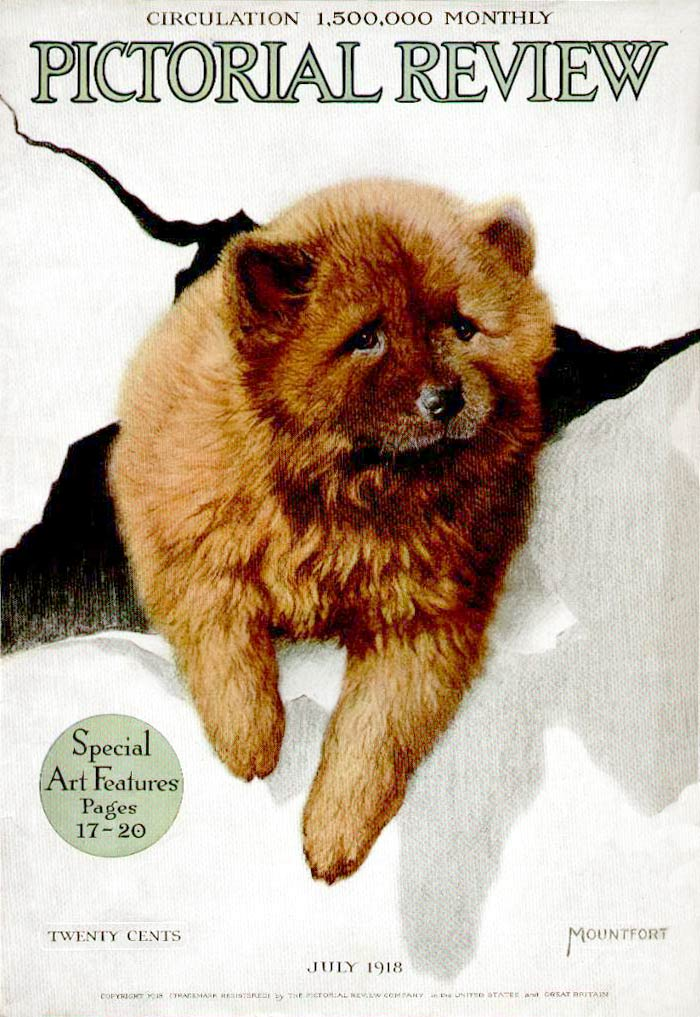
Pictorial Review 1918-07 cover

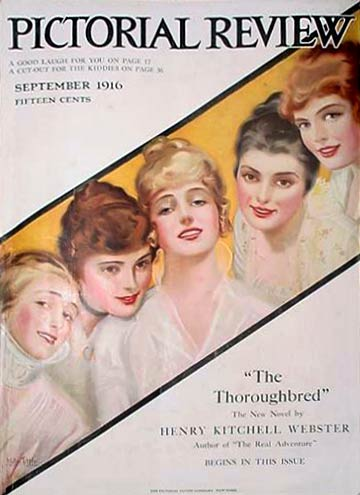
Pictorial Review 1916-09 cover

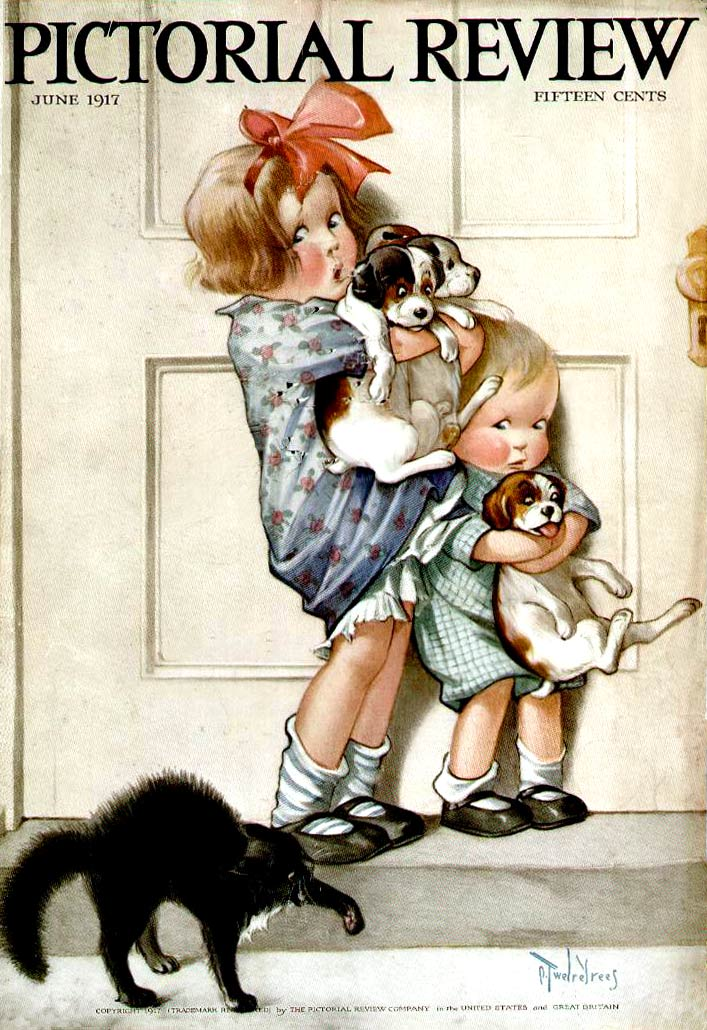
Pictorial Review 1917-06 cover

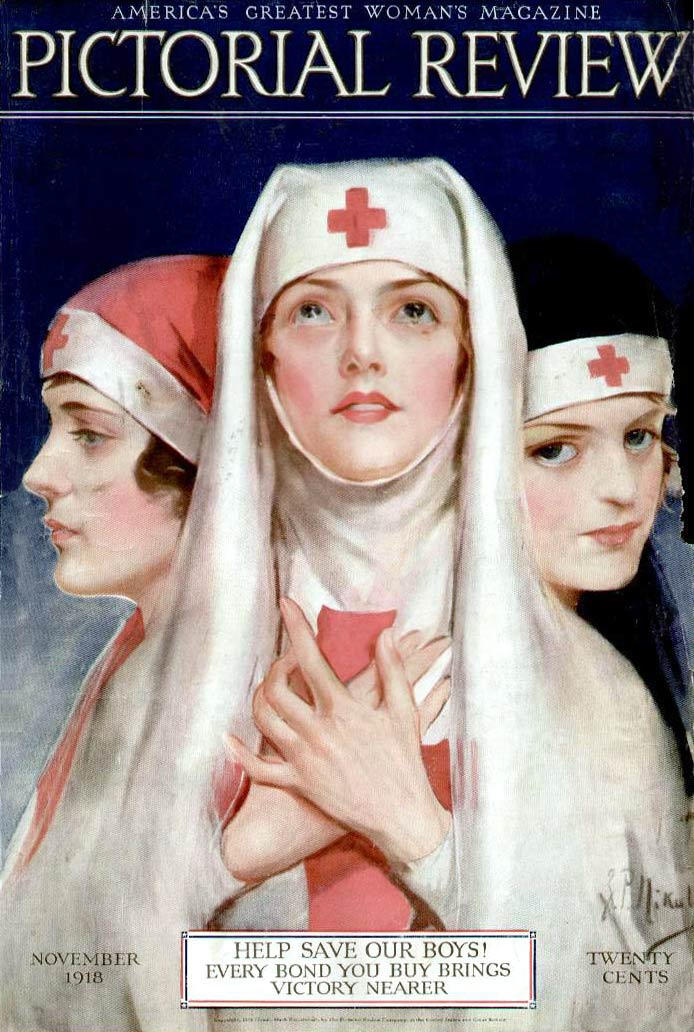
Pictorial Review 1918-11 cover

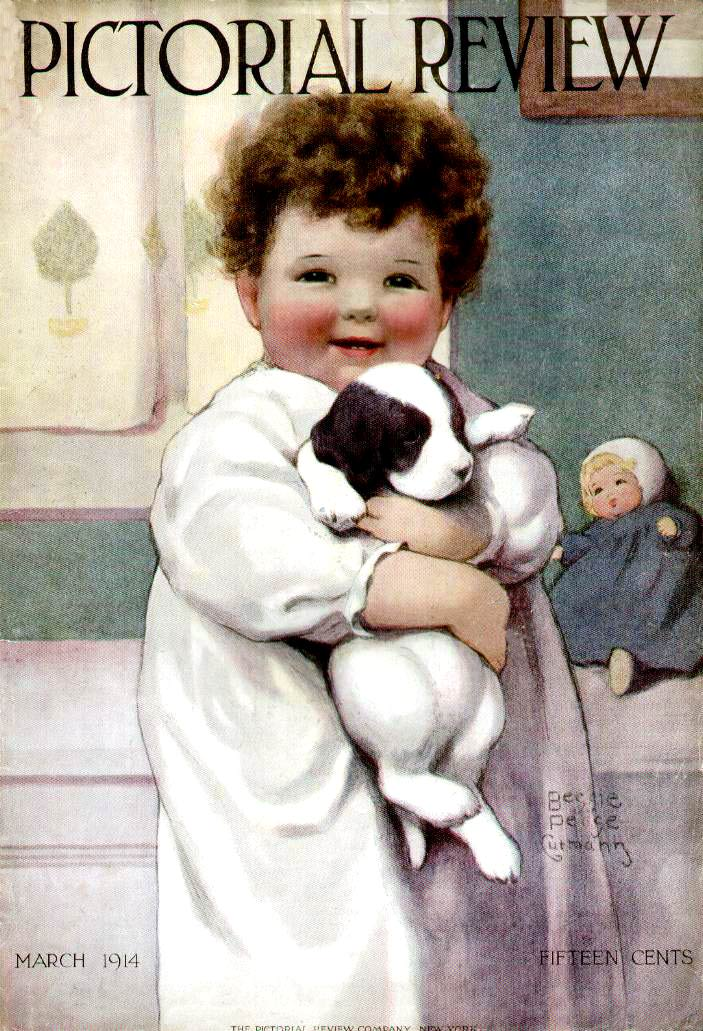
Pictorial Review 1914-03 cover

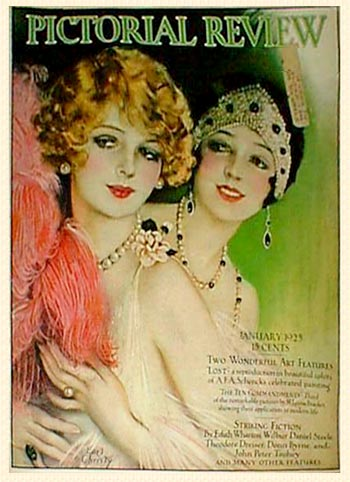
Pictorial Review 1923-01 cover

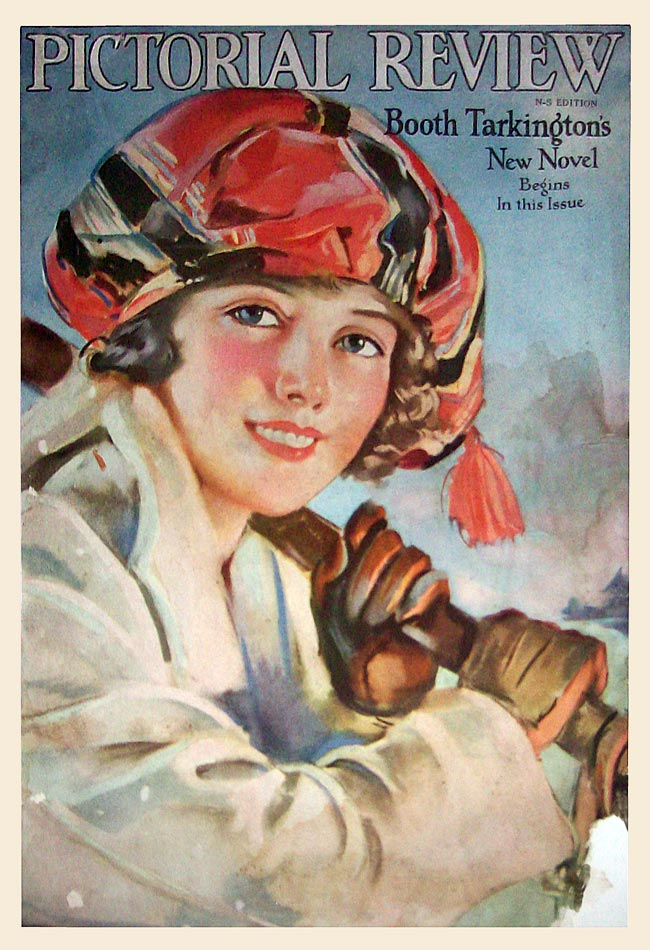
Pictorial Review 1921-02 cover

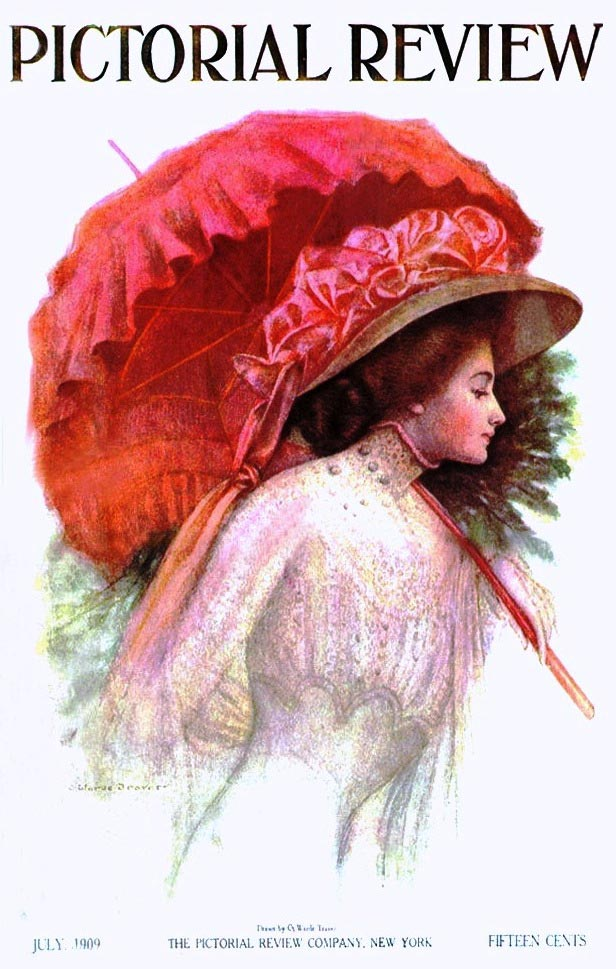
Pictorial Review 1909-07 cover

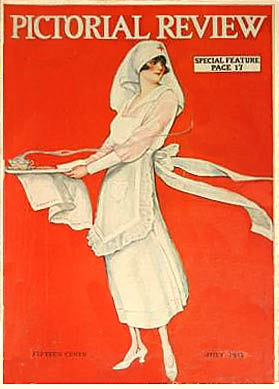
Pictorial Review 1917-07 cover

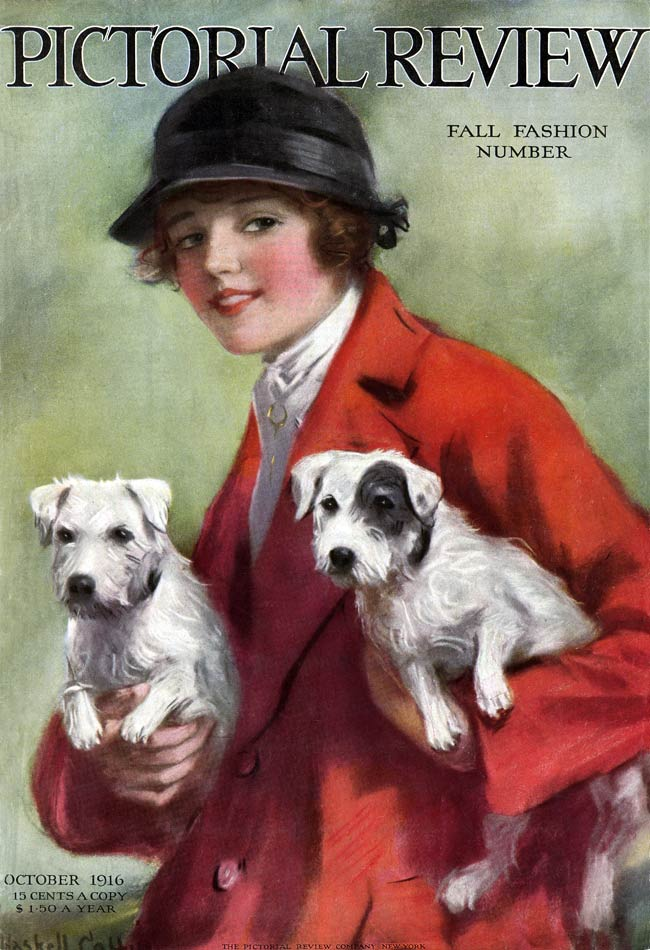
Pictorial Review 1916-10 cover

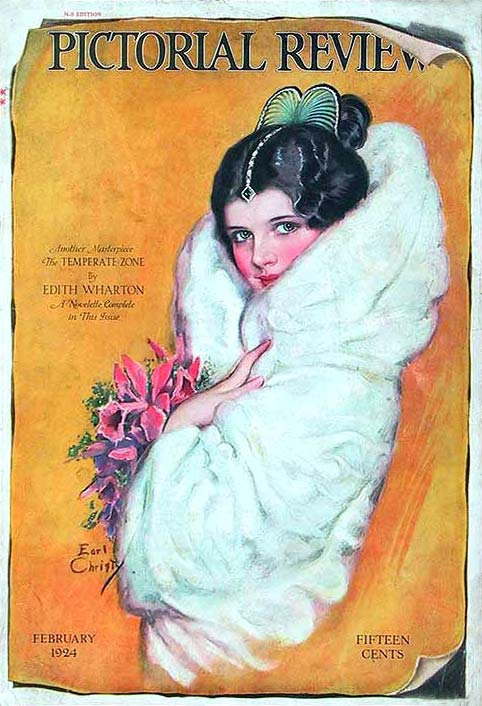
Pictorial Review 1924-02 cover

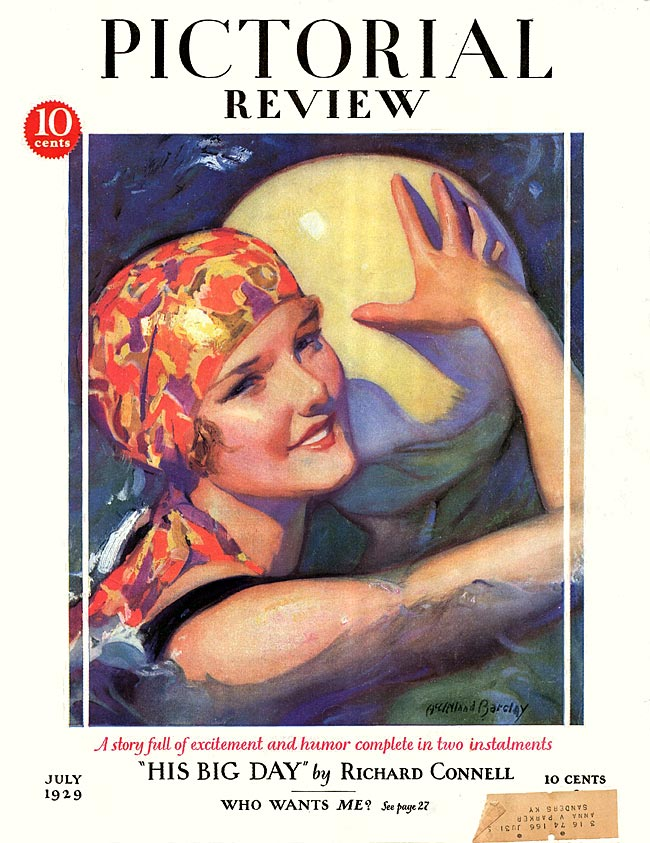
Pictorial Review 1929-07 cover

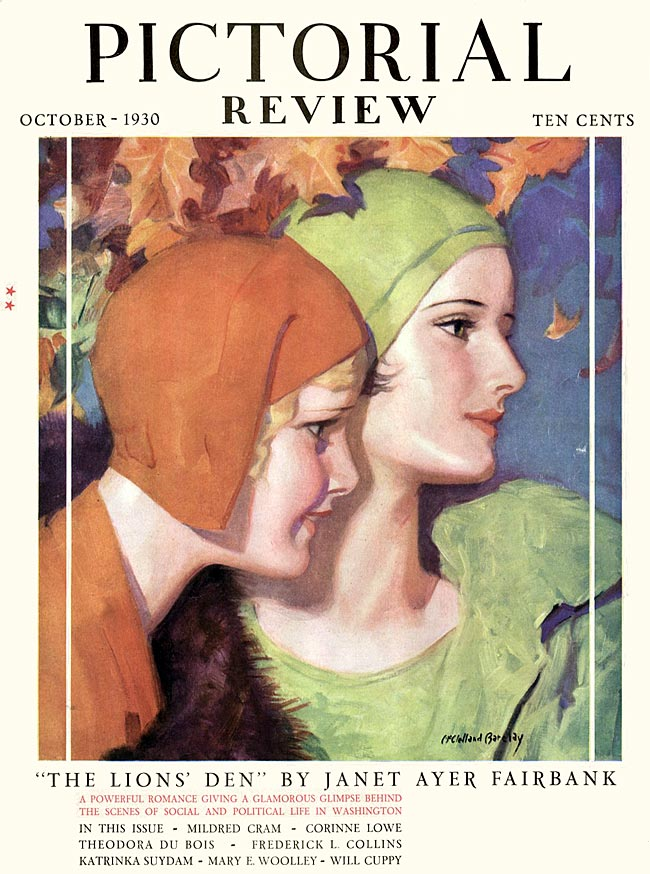
Pictorial Review 1930-10 cover

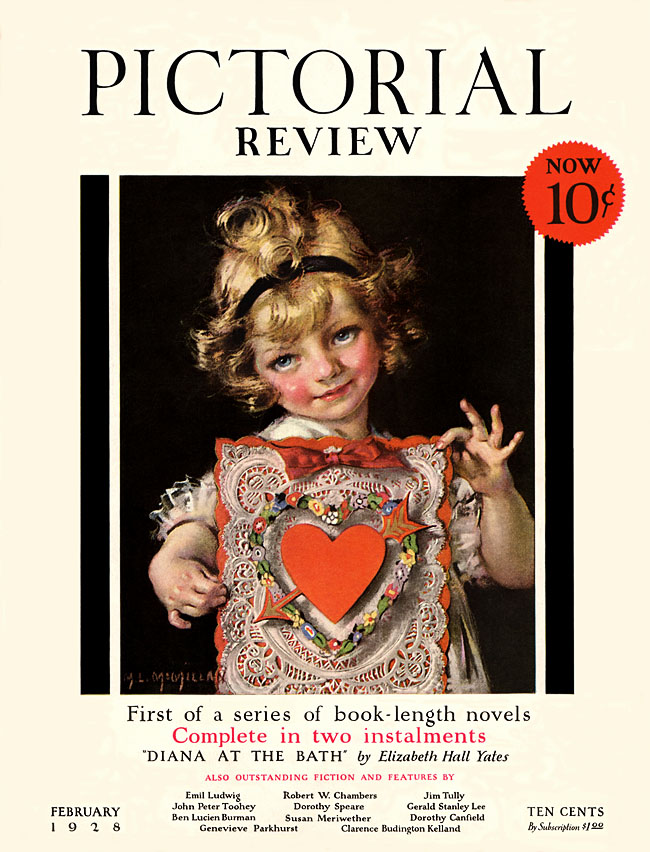
Pictorial Review 1928-02 cover

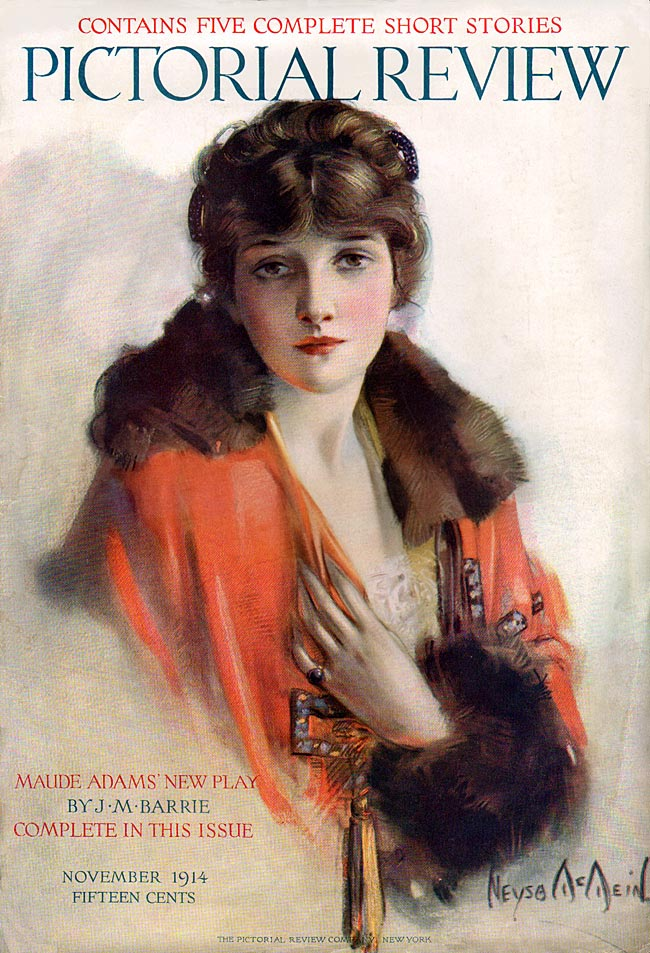
Pictorial Review 1914-11 cover

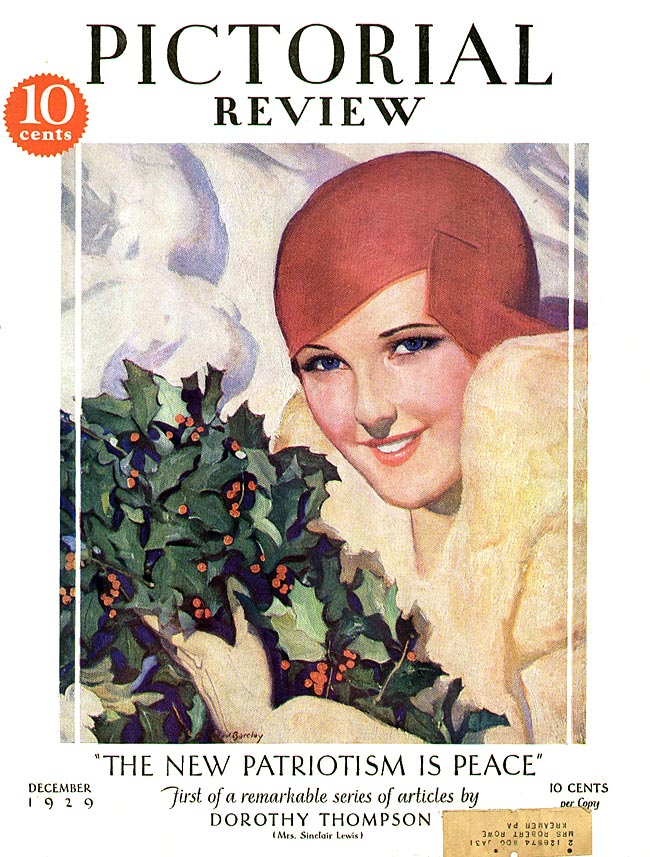
Pictorial Review 1929-12 cover

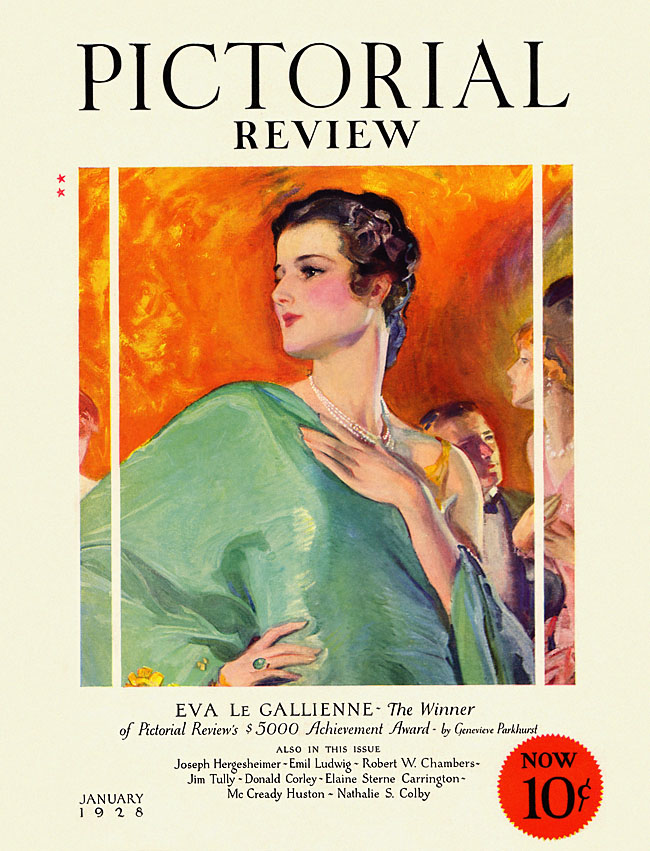
Pictorial Review 1928-01 cover

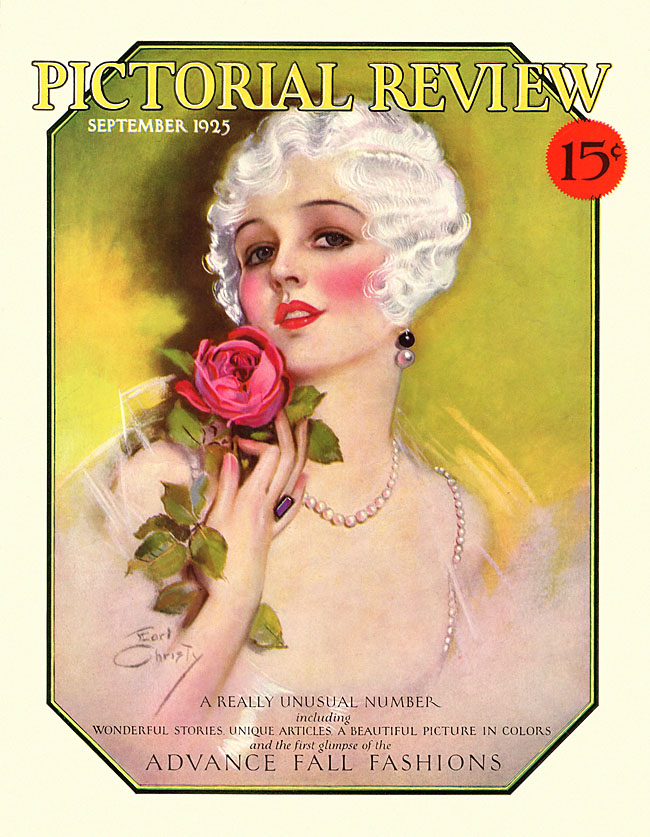
Pictorial Review 1925-09

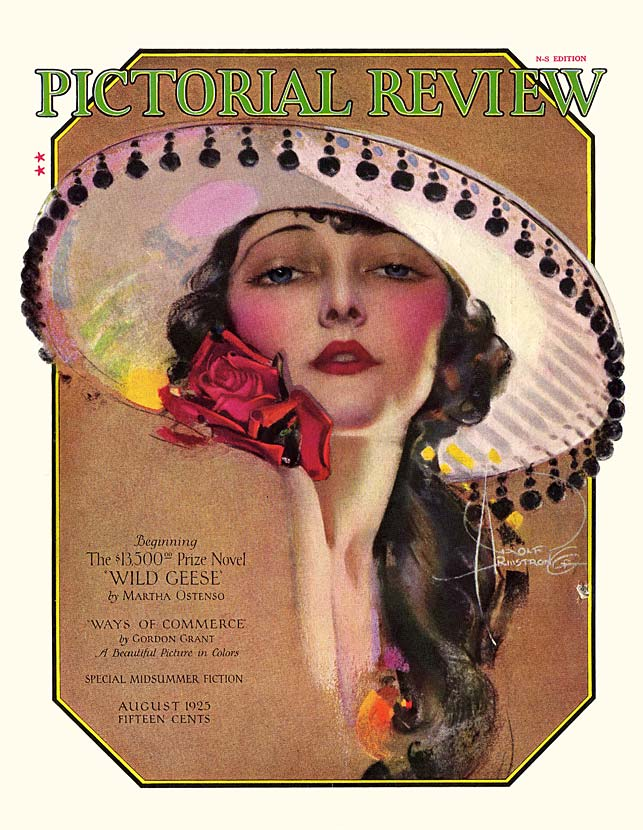
Pictorial Review 1925-08

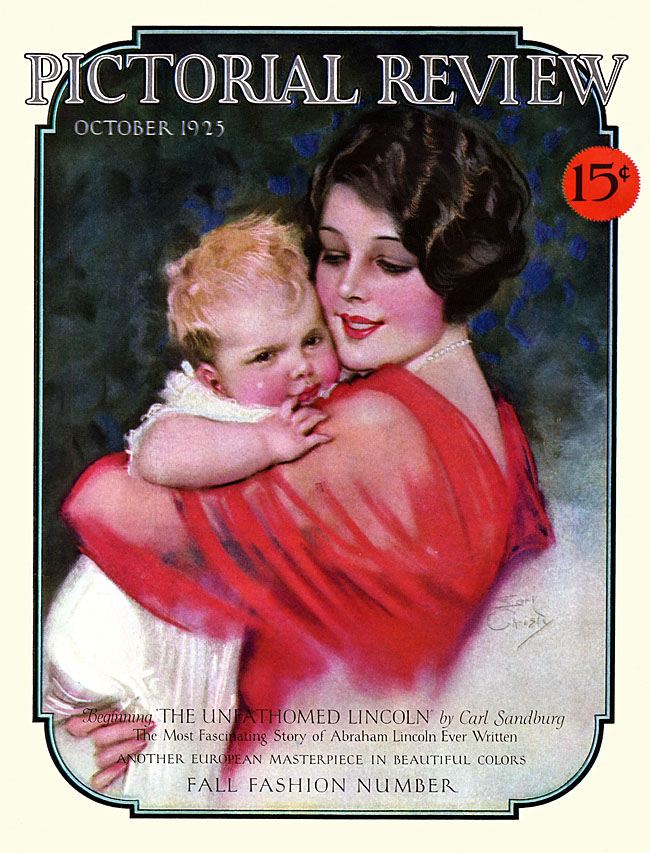
Pictorial Review 1925-10

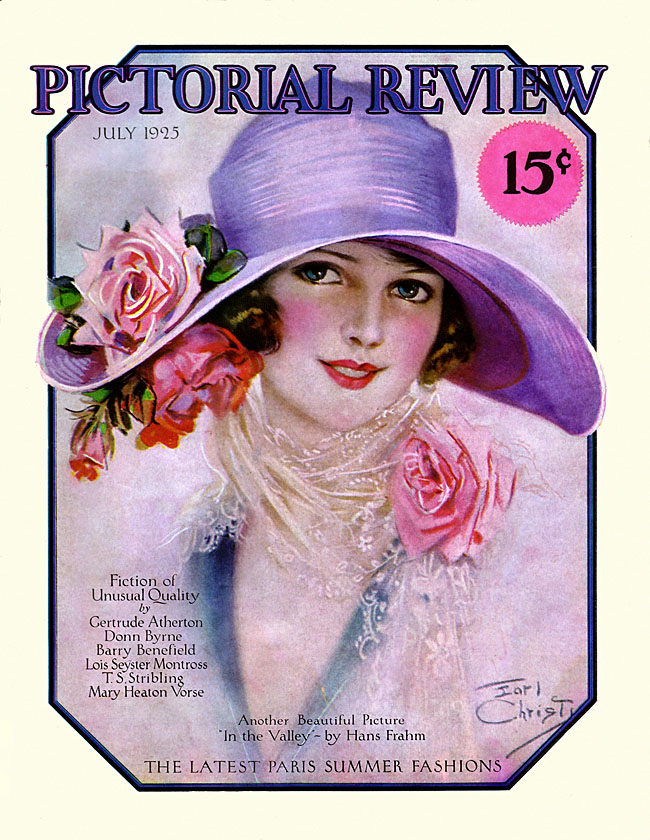
Pictorial Review 1925-07
