= Jessamine Female Institute =

Women's college in Nicholasville, Kentucky (1854–1910)

- Type: Private women's
- Active: 1855–1910
- Location: Nicholasville, Kentucky, United States
- Campus: 3 acres (1.2 ha)

Jessamine Female Institute was an American finishing school and college for women founded in Nicholasville, Kentucky. It opened in 1855 and closed in 1910.

== History ==
On May 20, 1854, the community of Nicholasville, Kentucky held a public meeting where it adopted a resolution in support of establishing a school for females. Later that year, the Legislature of Kentucky authorized a company to start a school in Nicholasville. When the school opened in 1855, M. Branch Price became its principal. Price was a Presbyterian minister and the majority of the school's founders were also Presbyterians. After Price died, Mrs. Jacob Price became the school's principal; she was married to a Presbyterian minister. Rev. Mr. Frazee replaced her in 1857, followed by Mrs. Browning.

Rev. Joseph McDowell Matthews of Hillsboro, Ohio rented the school property in 1860. He reincorporated the school as the Jessamine Female College. However, Matthews returned to Ohio after the end of the 1862 term. J. E. Spilman, pastor of the Nicholasville Presbyterian Church, operated the school for several years starting in 1863.

The Legislature of Kentucky granted a new charter for the non-sectarian Jessamine Female Institute in February 1866. Its incorporators were J.S. Bronaugh, George Brown, T. P. Crutcher, Joseph P. Letcher, and Robert Young. M. C. McCrohan replaced Rev. William Price was the institute's principal in 1867. McCrohan adding facilities for boarding students.

George G. Butler was the institute's principal in 1871. He was followed by professor Charles E. Young in 1873. In 1875, Rev. J. B. Thorpe became the institute's principal. From 1878 to 1881, the school was badly managed and its attendance decline. The institute closed in the spring of 1881 because of a lack of students.

Miss M. F. Hewitt was hired to reorganize the school and became its principal in September 1881; she managed it for the next twelve years. When the number of students increased under Hewitt's leadership, the institute's board of trustees voted to spend $20,000 on a new building in 1881. Residents of Nicholasville and the surrounding Jessamine County paid for the building by subscription. In September 1885, the institute had the largest number of students in history, including more than fifty boarders. The new building opened in September 1888.

Hewitt retired when her health declined and was replaced as principal by Mrs. B. W. (Nannie) Vineyard in 1893. When Vineyard left the institute to teach at Georgetown College, Mrs. J. B. Skinner became the school's principal in September 1901. She was the widow of the former president of Hamilton College and also taught history at Hamilton. Skinner resigned and was replaced by professor H. H. Savage on September 1, 1905.

In 1906 the school had between 100 and 200 students; thirty of whom were boarding students. On October 27, 1906, a fire damaged the institute's main building, including the girl's dormitory building. The fire gutted its library and reception hall. Damages were estimated to be $5,000 ($179,167 in today's money). Classes resumed several days later.

In the years that followed, the institute had declining finances. The institute fell behind by $5,600 on its mortgage. On April 4, 1910, the institute lost a foreclosure case in the circuit court.

In March 1911, it was announced that G. P. Simmons, an associate principal at Campbell–Hagerman College, had purchased the Jessamine Female Institute property to start a new school. However, his efforts to form a company failed. On May 27, 1911, the Jessamine Female Institute's property was divided into lots and was sold at auction.

== Campus ==
The campus of Jessamine Female Seminary was located on three acres on a hill west of Nicholasville, Kentucky. A new building was added in 1888. Soon afterward, improvements were made to the institute's library, laboratories, and classrooms.

== Academics ==
When the school opened in 1855, its curriculum included art, English, Greek, Latin, mathematics, modern languages, and music.

== Student life ==
Jessamine Female Institute had a chapter of Chi Omega social sorority from 1898 to 1902. The school also had a literary society.

In addition, the institute had a basketball team that competed against teams from other women's colleges.

== Notable alumnae ==
- Lena Madesin Phillips, lawyer who founded the National Business and Professional Women's Clubs
