= Elisabeth Feller =

Swiss entrepreneur and patron

- Born: 3 April 1910
- Died: 12 January 1973 (aged 62)

Elisabeth Feller (3 April 1910 Horgen 12 January 1973) was a Swiss entrepreneur and patron.

Elisabeth Feller was committed to Women's suffrage in Switzerland, and fought within the Employers' Union for equal pay. From 1950 to 1973, she headed the commission for equal pay for work of equal value of the Federation of Swiss Women's Associations. In 1959, she became the first non-Anglophone president of the International Federation of Business and Professional Women.

== Life ==
Elisabeth Feller was the daughter of Adolf Feller, founder of the electrical engineering company Feller AG, and Emma Feller, née Richi. When her father died in 1931, Elisabeth, then aged 21, left her studies in geography at the University of Zürich and the School of Economics to take over the business.

I do not believe that specialized knowledge is decisive for the management of a company. Specialized personnel can be hired for this purpose. What is decisive, on the other hand, is the climate that we create, the human relations, knowing how to create and provide trust, choosing the right collaborators and monitoring them, delegating responsibility.

Long before its competitors, the company provided benefits, its pension fund, a canteen, and local housing construction programs. To facilitate their integration, German courses are given to Italian employees and Italian courses to Swiss employees.

She made donations for social causes, sometimes soliciting the support of her staff via the company newspaper: for a school for Palestinian girls in Ramallah, the Albert Schweitzer Hospital in Lambaréné or even the Pestalozzi Village in Trogen. She also sponsors artists. Together with the pediatrician Marie Meierhofer, she campaigns to create modern nurseries. Together, they founded the Berghalden nursery, which has become one of the largest institutions for children in the region.

In 1970, she welcomed 37 refugees from Tibet to Horgen and offered them work in her company. In 1974, the Dalai Lama visited her company, but Elisabeth Feller died the previous year.
