= International Federation of Business and Professional Women =

British organization

International Federation of Business and Professional Women (or BPW International) is a worldwide organization committed to networking among and empowering women worldwide. BPW International serves as a forum for professional business women with branches in over 100 countries with a membership of over a quarter of a million, developing the professional, leadership and business potential of women on all levels through advocacy, mentoring and skill building. Their economic empowerment programs and projects around the world promote equal participation of women and men in decision-making roles at all levels. BPW International has consultative status with the United Nations Economic and Social Council (ECOSOC) and participatory status with the Council of Europe.

== Overview ==
The International Federation of Business and Professional Women gathers and offers the views of business and professional women to world organizations and agencies. BPW International promotes its objectives without distinction as to ethnicity, race, religion or political beliefs.

According to their website, members of local, regional and national clubs are to take an active role as professional women "in the economy, politics and society." They are to work on behalf of professional women everywhere, especially in the roles of mentoring and lobbying. The organization has a close relationship with the United Nations as well as other international organizations in their work to advance the role of women.

== History ==
The International Federation of Business and Professional Women was founded in Geneva, Switzerland, on August 26, 1930, by Dr. Lena Madesin Phillips of Kentucky. As President of the National Federation of Business and Professional Women's Clubs in the United States, Phillips had organized several trips to Europe in 1928 and 1929 to network with business and professional women in Europe. Hundreds of American clubwomen participated in these "Goodwill Tours" and the movement was born. The founding member countries of the BPW International were Austria, Canada, France, Great Britain, Italy and the United States of America. Dr. Phillips was elected as the first president of BPW International and served until 1947. In 1933 Dr. Phillips served as president of the International Council of Women which was held in conjunction with the Chicago World's Fair.

In 1934, the headquarters moved from Geneva to London, sharing office space at 20 Regent Street with the Electrical Association for Women (EAW). In 1936, British engineer and Director of the EAW Caroline Haslett became vice-president and president in 1950. By 1950, British membership had reached 90,000 and filmmaker Mary Field became the UK president when Haslett moved into the international president role.

=== Australia ===
Ann Margaret Magoffin "Peg" chaired Australia's finance committee during the 1950s and the 1960s. In 1966 she became President and she restructured the national organisation into branches in each state. In 1960 the organisation was allowed to intercede in a dispute about equal pay. Magoffin prepared the submission to the Commonwealth Court of Conciliation and Arbitration.

== See also ==
- Business and Professional Women's Foundation
- Azra Jafari, national director, Afghanistan
- Yvette Swan, former president
- Esther Afua Ocloo, honoree
- Elisabeth Feller, former president
