= Pi Delta Kappa =

American collegiate sorority

- ΠΔΚ
- Founded: October 1, 1907; 118 years ago Ohio University
- Type: Social
- Affiliation: Independent
- Status: Merged
- Merge date: 1913
- Successor: Chi Omega
- Scope: Local
- Motto: Non Progredi Est Regredi; To Not Go Forward Is To Go Backward"
- Colors: Old gold and Seal brown
- Symbol: Owl
- Flower: Pink rose
- Jewel: Emerald
- Publication: The Hour Glass
- Chapters: 3
- Members: 200+ lifetime
- Headquarters: Athens, Ohio; United States

Pi Delta Kappa (ΠΔΚ) was a collegiate sorority operating in Ohio from 1907 to 1913. The sorority established three chapter before being absorbed by Chi Omega.

== History ==
Pi Delta Kappa sorority was created at Ohio University in Athens, Ohio in 1907. It founders were four friends who attended Athens High School together and did not want to separate into different sororities. Professor Howell Lindley helped the students organize the sorority.

Pi Delta Kappa expanded in 1909 with Beta chapter at Miami University and Gamma chapter at the University of Cincinnati. By 1911, Pi Delta Kappa had 75 active members and had a total of 200 initiates.

Pi Delta Kappa was governed by a grand council consisting of a president, vice president, and secretary. It also had a publication editor, once it started publishing a magazine in 1911.

The sorority was absorbed by Chi Omega in 1913.

== Symbols ==
The motto of Pi Delta Kappa was Non Progredi Est Regredi or "To Not Go Forward Is To Go Backward". The sorority's badge was an owl with emerald eyes, wearing a mortar board with the sorority's letters. Its pledge pin was a gold mortar board with an azure blue band.

The sorority's colors were old gold and seal brown. Its flower was a pink rose. Its jewel was the emerald. Its magazine was The Hour Glass.

== Chapters ==
Following are the chapters of Pi Delta Kappa.

Chapter	Charter date and range	Institution	Location	Status	Ref.
Alpha	October 1, 1907 – 1913	Ohio University	Athens, Ohio	Merged (ΧΩ)	(Note: Became the Tau Alpha chapter of Chi Omega with the national merger of the two sororities.)
Beta	1909–1913	Miami University	Oxford, Ohio	Merged (ΧΩ)	(Note: Chapter formed from Alpha Gamma Chi (local), established in 1909. It became the Sigma Alpha chapter of Chi Omega with the national merger of the two sororities.)
Gamma	1909–1913	University of Cincinnati	Cincinnati, Ohio	Merged (ΧΩ)	(Note: Became the Pi Alpha chapter of Chi Omega with the national merger of the two sororities.)

== See also ==
- List of social sororities and women's fraternities
