= Lisa Sergio =

Italian radio news broadcaster (1905–1989)

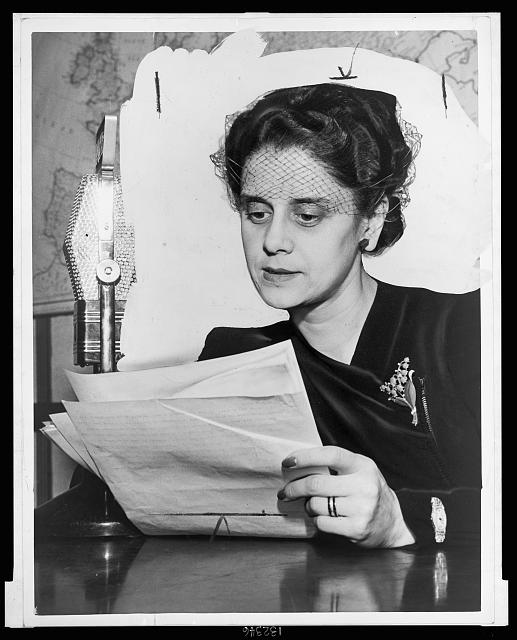
- Lisa Sergio in 1941
- Born: Lisa Sergio; March 17, 1905; Florence, Italy
- Died: June 22, 1989 (aged 84); Washington, D.C., USA
- Scientific career
- Fields: Broadcasting
- Workplaces: Italian Mail, WQXR, Columbia University

Lisa Sergio (Italian-American, 1905–1989) was a radio news broadcaster in Italy under Mussolini who became a leading anti-Fascist broadcaster and one of the first women to have her own radio news commentary program. She was the only woman Variety included in its 1945 analysis of 30 popular radio news commentators. Sergio died on June 22, 1989, in Washington, D.C.

== Early life ==
Lisa Sergio was born Elisa Maria Alice Sergio in Florence, Italy on March 17, 1905. Her father was Baron Agostino Sergio, a landowner and her mother was Margherita Fitzgerald, daughter of Charles Hoffman Fitzgerald of Baltimore, Maryland, and Alice Lawrason Riggs from Virginia. Her parents separated in 1910, after her father attempted to shoot her mother.

== Journalistic career in Italy ==
In 1922, Sergio became an associate editor of the Italian Mail, the only English-language weekly in Italy, eventually becoming the assistant editor and then the editor. Known as "the Golden Voice of Rome," Sergio was one of the first women broadcasters in Italy. Having grown up speaking both Italian and English at home, Sergio translated Benito Mussolini's speeches into English on the air. By most accounts, she was supportive of Mussolini and fascism until at least 1937, but according to biographer Stacy Spaulding, when Sergio did convert to anti-fascism, her "conversion was authentic and heartfelt." In a note she wrote at the time, she remarked, "Human beings are not born knowing. They are endowed, from birth with the capacity to learn. They learn to walk, to talk. We must also learn how to be free."

== WQXR ==
After moving to the US, Sergio worked for NBC. Frustrated because she believed that "NBC was not about to allow a woman to do news," Sergio began to work for local New York City station WQXR in 1939. Sergio became one of the first female news commentators on WQXR, developing her program, "A Column of the Air." Although Sergio's commentary has been dismissed as being of interest mainly to women, "A Column of the Air" was intended to address the crisis in Europe and her address to all listeners was made possible, according to Spaulding, by WQXR's programming decision to address its listeners in terms of culture and education rather than strictly in terms of gender. "A Column of the Air" broadcast seven times a week from 1939 to 1946, when WQXR cancelled all its news commentary. When asked whether her gender made a difference in the quality of her broadcasting, Sergio wrote, "Here, too, women can claim and hold a place. If men and women are equally needed in the war effort, as they indubitably are, if men and women the world over are bearing the tragic burden of a war without quarter, as they are, it follows that men and women can equally contribute to the understanding of issues at stake and of the sometimes baffling trend of the events which affect us."

== Blacklist ==
Sergio, who had been the subject of extensive FBI surveillance since she immigrated to the United States, was blacklisted by the American Legion in 1949 and listed in the anti-communist publication Red Channels in 1950.

== Other writing ==
Sergio was also the author of several books, including a biography of Anita Garibaldi and a biography of lawyer and clubwoman Lena Madesin Phillips

== The American University of Rome ==
Sergio, along with David Colin and Giorgio Tesoro, founded The American University of Rome in 1969 in the firm belief that education was the only way to prevent the world from tearing itself apart for a third time in a century. International understanding, firmly rooted in American democratic values, was the key to a peaceful and productive future.

== Death ==
Sergio died on June 22, 1989, at her home in Washington, D.C.

== Sources ==
Sandro Gerbi, The Golden Voice of Mussolini and Roosevelt: Radio Journalist Lisa Sergio, Palgrave Macmillan 2026
