= Business and Professional Women's Foundation =

American organization

Business and Professional Women's Foundation logo

Business and Professional Women's Foundation (BPW) is an organization established for workforce development programs and workplace policies to acknowledge the needs of working women, communities, and businesses. It supports the National Federation of Business and Professional Women's Clubs.

== Structure ==
The work of BPW Foundation is supported through corporate partnerships, grants, and individual philanthropic donations. Its Combined Federal Campaign (CFC) number is 10506. It is governed by a board of trustees.

== History ==
=== Founding ===
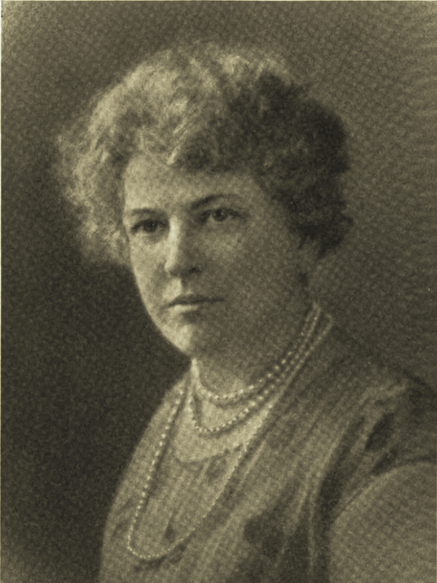
Gladys H. Lent-Barndollar, past president, National Federation of Business and Professional Women's Clubs

While mobilizing for World War I, the U.S. government recognized the need for a cohesive group to coordinate identification of women's available skills and experience. A Women's War Council, financed through a federal grant, was established by the War Department to organize the resources of professional women. It was guided principally by executives of the Young Women's Christian Association (YWCA). The National Federation of Business and Professional Women's Clubs was founded on July 16, 1919, at a meeting led by Lena Madesin Phillips of Kentucky. In the 1930s, it became a charter member of the International Federation of Business and Professional Women.

BPW/USA became the first organization created to focus on the issues of working women. BPW worked throughout the 1930s to prohibit legislation or directives denying jobs to married women and lobbied successfully to legislatively end the legal practice of workplace preference for unmarried persons and, in the case of married persons, preference for males. BPW/USA was one of the first women's organizations to endorse the Equal Rights Amendment in 1937.

=== During World War II ===
At the advent of World War II, BPW developed a classification system for women with specialized skills critical to the war effort and supported the formation of women's branches of the U.S. Armed Forces. While wage discrimination has existed in the U.S. since women and minorities first entered the paid workforce, its prevalence was not felt until the massive influx of women sought work during World War II. Immediately following the war, the Women's Equal Pay Act (1945) —the first ever legislation to require equal pay—was introduced in the U.S. Congress. It was another 18 years before an equal pay bill made its way to the President's desk to be signed into law.

=== Incorporation and subsequent activities ===
BPW Foundation was incorporated in 1956 as the first foundation dedicated to providing resources to and about working women. It included research, information, career development programs, workshops and other training opportunities. The Marguerite Rawal Resource Center, established in 1980 and put on-line 2006, is a major resource for information and documents on the history of women and women in the workplace.

The establishment of "Status of Women" commissions in the U.S. in 1963 was due largely to BPW efforts. President John F. Kennedy recognized BPW's leading role in securing passage of the Equal Pay Act by giving BPW's National President the first pen he used when signing the Act into law.

Virginia Allan initiated the "Young Careerist" Program to develop the business and presentation skills of young women between 25 and 35 years of age. The first National Legislative Conference, held in 1963 in D.C., later developed into BPW's current Policy & Action Conference, where members lobby Congress and the Administration on BPW's legislative issues.

BPW tackled "comparable worth" by calling for newspapers to stop the occupational segregation in classified ads (clustering of women in a few restricted occupations of low-paying, dead-end jobs). Numerous state and municipal governments revamped their pay scales, recognizing dissimilar jobs may not be identical, but may be composed of tasks, educational requirements, experience and other characteristics that are equivalent or comparable. In 1986, San Francisco became the first city in the nation to approve a pay equity referendum, implementing $34 million in increases for employees in female and minority-dominated jobs. Continuing with BPW's focus on workplace issues, BPW lobbied Congress for passage of the Family and Medical Leave Act, which finally passed in 1993.

Discussions on comparable worth were expanded to include enforcement and strengthening of existing Equal Pay legislation. The Pay Equity Employment Act of 1994, followed by the Equal Pay Act (introduced in 1994) and the Paycheck Fairness Act (introduced in 1997) became BPW's focus legislation through the '90s. Then-Secretary of Labor, Elizabeth Dole, and First Lady Barbara Bush addressed BPW's members at the White House Briefing during the 1990 "Lobby Day" event. Subsequent speakers have included Senator Tom Harkin, First Lady (Senator) Hillary Clinton and Congresswomen Rosa DeLauro and Eleanor Holmes Norton.

=== 21st century ===
In 2005, BPW used its grassroots power to continue the Bureau of Labor and Statistics' (BLS) Working Women Series and to re-instate Lifetime TV on the DISH Network programming. Same year in October, BPW/USA launched Women Joining Forces: Closing Ranks, Opening Doors (WJF), a program to support women veterans as they transition from military to civilian life. This commitment made BPW/USA the first and only non-governmental agency to offer programming that supports women veterans.

Workplace equity issues including sexual harassment, opportunities for women veterans, work-life balance, health care reform, dependent care, tort reform, increasing the minimum wage, lifetime economic security and pay equity continue to be BPW's targeted issues.

In 2009 BPW Foundation merged with its sister organization BPW/USA.

== See also ==
- International Federation of Business and Professional Women
