= List of Auburn University fraternities and sororities =

Auburn University was established in 1856 in Auburn, Alabama. Some 9,000 students are members of the 54 Greek letter organizations at Auburn University. These organizations are overseen by three governing councils: the Interfraternity Council, the Panhellenic Council, and the National Pan-Hellenic Council. Professional fraternities operate independently from the three councils. Each year, Auburn's Greek letter organizations contribute around $1,400,000 and 50,000 hours of community service.

== Background ==
Over 9,000 students are members of the 54 Greek letter organizations at Auburn University. In additional to serving as social organizations, Greek letter organizations at Auburn support academic success, community service, leadership opportunities, and personal development. Each year, Auburn's Greek letter organizations contribute around $1,400,000 and 50,000 hours of community service. These organizations are overseen by three governing councils: the Interfraternity Council, the Panhellenic Council, and the National Pan-Hellenic Council.

The Interfraternity Council was brought to Auburn University over 100 years ago with the founding of Sigma Alpha Epsilon fraternity in 1878. Auburn is home to 28 fraternities that involve around 3,200 members or 24% of the male student population. The Interfraternity Council's missions' statement is to “govern, to serve, to represent, and to promote, with the highest standard of integrity, its member fraternities.” Fraternity members reside in chapter houses.

Women were first admitted to Auburn in 1892. The Panhellenic Council was created with the chartering of a Kappa Delta sorority chapter at Auburn University in 1929. The organization includes eighteen sororities and women's fraternities that are members of the National Panhellenic Conference. Around 5,400 students are active in a sororities and women's fraternities at Auburn University, representing about 43% of the female undergraduate population. Some 16% of the university's dormitory housing is set aside for sororities.

The National Pan-Hellenic Council (NPHC) includes African American fraternities and sororities that are members of the national organization with the same name. It was founded fifty years ago with the chartering of the first black fraternity at Auburn University, Omega Psi Phi, in 1972. The first black sorority at Auburn University was Delta Sigma Theta in 1974. The council now includes four fraternities and four sororities, with around 100 members. The council members at Auburn have a tradition of performing a Tiger Stomp Step Show and the Unity Yard Show.

The now-dormant Multi-Cultural Greek Council was established in 2019. It consisted of Omega Delta Phi multicultural fraternity and Kappa Delta Chi Latina sorority.

== Interfraternity Council ==
=== Active ===
Following is a list of active Interfraternity Council members at Auburn University.

Organization	Chapter	Symbols	Charter date and range	Ref.
Sigma Alpha Epsilon	Alabama Alpha Mu	ΣΑΕ	June 15, 1878 – 1880; 1886	
Phi Delta Theta	Alabama Beta	ΦΔΘ	January 30, 1879 – 2014; 2017	
Alpha Tau Omega	Alpha Epsilon	ΑΤΩ	January 2, 1879 – 2001; 2006	
Kappa Alpha Order	Nu	ΚΑ	November 24, 1883	
Sigma Nu	Beta Theta	ΣΝ	1890	
Pi Kappa Alpha	Upsilon	ΠΚΑ	April 5, 1895	
Lambda Chi Alpha	Omega Zeta	ΛΧΑ	1915	(Note: Chapter formed from the local group Delta Pi Epsilon, established in 1908. Later, it absorbed the local group Theta Kappa Nu.)
Theta Chi	Chi	ΘΧ	1918	(Note: Chapter formed from the local group Alpha Sigma, established in 1914.)
Alpha Gamma Rho	Xi	ΑΓΡ	April 28, 1919	(Note: Chapter formed from the local group Alpha Gamma, established in 1917.)
Alpha Epsilon Pi	Theta	ΑΕΠ	1921–1927, 1969–1984, 2014	
Pi Kappa Phi	Alpha Iota	ΠΚΦ	October 2, 1926 – xxxx ?; October 24, 2009	(Note: Chapter formed from the local group Tau Kappa Phi, established in 1921.)
Sigma Pi	Alpha Delta	ΣΠ	February 26, 1926	(Note: Chapter formed from the local group Pi Omega Phi, established in 1921.)
Phi Kappa Tau	Lambda	ΦΚΤ	1927–1939, 1942	(Note: Chapter formed from the local chapter of Sigma Theta, established in 1923. After going dormant, it reformed from Beta Kappa (local), established in 1927.)
Sigma Chi	Gamma Sigma	ΣΧ	1934–2013, 2019	
Tau Kappa Epsilon	Beta Lambda	ΤΚΕ	July 12, 1947 – 1999; 2005	(Note: Chapter formed from the local group Alpha Lambda Tau, established in 1927.)
Delta Chi	Auburn	ΔΧ	1951–1984, 1989	
Delta Tau Delta	Epsilon Alpha	ΔΤΔ	May 24, 1952 – 1999; 2004	(Note: Chapter formed from the Crescent Club, established in 1950.)
Theta Xi	Beta Zeta Colony	ΘΞ	February 26, 1954 – 2000; 2011–2017, 2021	(Note: Revived as a colony in 2022.)
Phi Gamma Delta	Alpha Upsilon	ΦΓΔ	October 27, 1962	
Chi Phi	Mu Delta	ΧΦ	1967–1979, 1983	
FarmHouse	Alpha Zeta	FH	May 28, 1971	
Beta Upsilon Chi	Omega	ΒΥΧ	October 30, 2008	
Phi Sigma Kappa	Omega Septaton	ΦΣΚ	November 20, 2010	
Delta Kappa Epsilon	Delta Alpha	ΔΚΕ	November 7, 2012 – 2015; 2022	
Sigma Tau Gamma	Epsilon Chi	ΣΤΓ	December 5, 2012	
Alpha Sigma Phi	Zeta Psi	ΑΣΦ	2013	
Acacia	Colony		2021	(Note: Colony started in 2020.)
Beta Theta Pi	Delta Zeta	ΒΘΠ	1964-2018, 2024	
Delta Sigma Phi	Kappa	ΔΣΦ	November 9, 1908 - 1911,1921 - December 11, 2017; 2025	

=== Inactive ===
Organization	Chapter	Symbols	Charter date and range	Ref.
Sigma Phi Epsilon	Alabama Alpha	ΣΦΕ		
Kappa Sigma	Beta Eta	ΚΣ		
Phi Kappa Psi	Alabama Beta	ΦΚΨ		

Following is a list of former Interfraternity Council members at Auburn University.

== Panhellenic Council ==
=== Active ===
Following is a list of active Panhellenic Council members at Auburn University.

Organization	Chapter	Symbols	Charter date and range	Ref.
Kappa Delta	Sigma Lambda	ΚΔ	September 4, 1922	(Note: Chapter formed from the local group The Owls, established in 1921.)
Chi Omega	Alpha Beta	ΧΩ	September 9, 1923	(Note: Chapter formed from the local group Sigma Beta Delta, established in 1921.)
Alpha Gamma Delta	Gamma Delta	ΑΓΔ	April 22, 1939	(Note: Chapter formed from the local group Alpha Gamma, established in 1938.)
Delta Zeta	Alpha Beta	ΔΖ	1940	(Note: Chapter formed from the local group Zeta Delta, established in 1939. In 1946, it absorbed the campus chapter of Phi Omega Pi with the national mergers of the two sororities.)
Alpha Delta Pi	Beta Omega	ΑΔΠ	October 24, 1942	(Note: Chapter formed from the local group Alpha Delta, established in 1941.)
Phi Mu	Alpha Mu	ΦΜ	1943	
Alpha Omicron Pi	Delta Delta	ΑΟΠ	1946	(Note: Chapter formed from the local chapter of Phi Omega Pi.)
Zeta Tau Alpha	Gamma Rho	ZTA	June 15, 1951 – 1971; 1977	
Delta Delta Delta	Phi Theta	ΔΔΔ	1954	
Pi Beta Phi	Alabama Gamma	ΠΒΦ	1957	
Kappa Alpha Theta	Gamma Omega	ΚΑΘ	January 26, 1957 – 2000: 2009	
Kappa Kappa Gamma	Epsilon Eta	ΚΚΓ	March 23, 1963	
Alpha Chi Omega	Epsilon Zeta	ΑΧΩ	February 16, 1967	
Gamma Phi Beta	Gamma Phi	ΓΦΒ	May 3, 1968 – 1983; 1996	
Delta Gamma	Delta Sigma	ΔΓ	1972 – 1988; 2003	
Alpha Xi Delta	Zeta Xi	ΑΞΔ	1980	
Sigma Kappa	Theta Xi	ΣΚ	February 1989	
Sigma Sigma Sigma	Theta Iota	ΣΣΣ	2016	

=== Inactive ===
Following is a list of former Panhellenic Council members at Auburn University.

Organization	Chapter	Symbols	Charter date and range	Ref.
Phi Alpha Chi	Gamma	ΦΑΧ	1927–1928	(Note: Chapter formed from the local group Phi Delta Rho, established in 1923.) (Note: Sorority is defunct.)
Pi Kappa Sigma	Alpha Alpha	ΠΚΣ	1927–1937	(Note: Chapter formed from the local group Sigma Rho, established in 1923.)
Sigma Phi Beta	Mu	ΣΦΒ	1928–1933	(Note: Chapter formed from the local group Phi Alpha Chi, established in 1927. After a merger of national sororities, it became a chapter of Phi Omega Pi.)
Phi Omega Pi	Psi	ΦΩΠ	1933–1946	(Note: Chapter formed by absorbing the chapter of Sigma Phi Beta. It became Delta Zeta after a national merger of the two sororities. In 1946, it withdrew from the sorority and formed a still-existing chapter of Alpha Omicron Pi.)
Theta Upsilon	Beta Xi	ΘΥ	1940–1956	

== National Pan-Hellenic Council ==
=== Active ===
Following is a list of active National Pan-Hellenic Council members at Auburn University.

Organization	Chapter	Symbols	Charter date and range	Ref.
Omega Psi Phi	Sigma Delta	ΩΨΦ	June 19, 1972	
Delta Sigma Theta	Kappa Upsilon	ΔΣΘ	January 12, 1974	
Alpha Kappa Alpha	Alpha Chi	ΑΚΑ	July 12, 1976	
Phi Beta Sigma	Kappa Zeta	ΦΒΣ	1978	
Zeta Phi Beta	Gamma Xi	ΖΦΒ	1989	
Sigma Gamma Rho	Omicron Iota	ΣΓΡ	1997	
Kappa Alpha Psi	Theta Delta	ΚΑΨ	1975–2020, 2024	
Alpha Phi Alpha	Omicron Kappa	ΑΦΑ	May 29, 1982 – 2022, 2024	

=== Inactive ===
Following is a list of dormant National Pan-Hellenic Council members at Auburn University.

Organization	Chapter	Symbols	Charter date and range	Ref.
Iota Phi Theta	Colony	ΙΦΘ		

== Multicultural Council ==
=== Inactive ===
Following is a list of dormant multicultural Greek letter organizations at Auburn University.

Organization	Chapter	Symbols	Charter date and range	Emphasis	Ref.
Omega Delta Phi	Auburn Colony	ΩΔΦ	April 30, 2016 - 2022		
Kappa Delta Chi	Beta Phi	ΚΔΧ	November 25, 2016 – 2022	Latina sorority	

== Professional ==
=== Active ===
Following is a list of active multicultural and professional Greek letter organizations at Auburn University.

Organization	Chapter	Symbols	Charter date and range	Emphasis	Ref.
Alpha Eta Rho	Gamma	ΑΗΡ	November 1, 1966	Aviation fraternity	
Alpha Omega Epsilon	Beta Nu	ΑΩΕ	November 13, 1983	Engineering and social women's fraternity	
Alpha Kappa Psi	Mu Omega	ΑΚΨ	May 6, 1989	Business fraternity	

=== Inactive ===
Following is a list of dormant multicultural Greek letter organizations at Auburn University.

Organization	Chapter	Symbols	Charter date and range	Emphasis	Ref.
Alpha Psi	Theta	ΑΨ	January 1, 1912	Medical and pharmaceutical	
