= List of Kappa Beta Gamma chapters =

Kappa Beta Gamma is a North American college sorority that was founded in 1917 at Marquette University in Milwaukee, Wisconsin. The sorority has chartered more than fifty chapters in the United States and Canada. Originally, chapters were established at Catholic institutions, with the sorority later expanding to other institutions.

== Chapters ==
Following are the chapters of Kappa Beta Gamma, with active chapters in bold and inactive chapters in italics.

Chapter	Charter date and range	Institution	Location	Status	Ref.
Beta	January 22, 1917 – 1973	Marquette University	Milwaukee, Wisconsin	Inactive	
Alpha	May 14, 1947 – 1975	Saint Louis University	St. Louis, Missouri	Withdrew	(Note: Chapter formed from Delta Epsilon Phi (local), established in 1928. It withdrew to become the Alpha chapter of Kappa Beta Phi in coordination with the founding Beta chapter of the sorority at Marquette. In 1975, it withdrew to become Kappa Beta Phi (local), then in 1989 accepted a charter as the Eta Nu chapter of Alpha Delta Pi.)
Gamma	Spring 1948–1953	Creighton University	Omaha, Nebraska	Withdrew	(Note: Chapter formed from Kappa Zeta Kappa (local), established in 1938. Withdrew to become part of Theta Upsilon, then became part of Delta Zeta after the merger.)
**Delta**	June 16, 1948	University of Detroit Mercy	Detroit, Michigan	Active	
Epsilon	Spring 1954–2007	Loyola University Chicago	Chicago, Illinois	Withdrew	(Note: Withdrew to become Eta Lambda chapter of Kappa Kappa Gamma in 2007.)
Zeta	1961–1966	Loyola University New Orleans	New Orleans, Louisiana	Inactive	
Eta	1961–1983	Catholic University of America	Washington, D.C.	Inactive	
**Theta**	1963–1970, 19xx ?	St. Norbert College	De Pere, Wisconsin	Active	(Note: Chapter formed from Kappa Beta Phi (local), established in 1958.)
Iota	1968–1992 ?	St. John's University	Jamaica, Queens, New York	Inactive	(Note: Chapter formed from Iota Sigma Phi (local), established in 1961.)
Kappa	August 2, 1997 – March 17, 2017	Marian University	Fond du Lac, Wisconsin	Inactive	
Lambda	July 13, 2002 – 2017	Northern Michigan University	Marquette, Michigan	Inactive	
Mu	July 12, 2002 – 2005	University of Findlay	Findlay, Ohio	Inactive	
Nu	2003–2007	Franklin & Marshall College	Lancaster, Pennsylvania	Withdrew	(Note: Withdrew to become Eta Lambda chapter of Kappa Delta in 2008.)
Xi	October 27, 2007 – 2015	Frostburg State University	Frostburg, Maryland	Inactive	(Note: Chapter formed from Gamma Sigma Chi (local), established in 2002.)
Omicron (see **Alpha Lambda**)	2009–2015	Shippensburg University of Pennsylvania	Shippensburg, Pennsylvania	Reestablished	(Note: Chapter formed from Theta Kappa (local), established in 1968.)
**Pi**	February 8, 2009 – 2015; February 2, 2025	Keene State College	Keene, New Hampshire	Active	(Note: Chapter formed from Tau Phi Xi (local), established in 1982.)
**Rho**	June 18, 2009	Caldwell University	Caldwell, New Jersey	Active	(Note: Chapter formed from Delta Nu Sigma (local).)
**Sigma**	December 4, 2010	Wake Forest University	Winston-Salem, North Carolina	Active	(Note: Chapter formed from North Carolina Gamma chapter of Pi Beta Phi, established in 1994.)
Tau	November 20, 2010 – 2016	University of Minnesota Duluth	Duluth, Minnesota	Inactive	
**Upsilon**	April 2, 2011	University of Victoria	Victoria, British Columbia, Canada	Active	
**Phi**	January 22, 2011 – 2025	Penn State Harrisburg	Middletown, Pennsylvania	Colony	(Note: Chapter was changed to an interest group (colony) in the fall of 2025.)
Chi	January 15, 2011 – 2024	Brandeis University	Waltham, Massachusetts	Inactive	
Psi	April 28, 2011 – February 20, 2017	Georgia Gwinnett College	Lawrenceville, Georgia	Inactive	
Omega				Memorial	
Alpha Alpha	July 9, 2011 – 2016	Trine University	Angola, Indiana	Inactive	
Alpha Beta	November 12, 2011 – 2019	University of Connecticut	Storrs, Connecticut	Inactive	
**Alpha Gamma**	November 24, 2012	Simon Fraser University	Burnaby, British Columbia, Canada	Active	
Alpha Delta	October 26, 2013 – 2024	St. Joseph's College	Patchogue, New York	Inactive	(Note: Chapter formed from Lambda Psi Iota (local), established in 2002.)
**Alpha Epsilon**	December 7, 2013	Lawrence Technological University	Southfield, Michigan	Active	
Alpha Zeta	December 6, 2014	University of Louisiana at Monroe	Monroe, Louisiana	Inactive	
**Alpha Eta**	May 3, 2015	Central Methodist University	Fayette, Missouri	Active	
**Alpha Theta**	July 31, 2015	Thompson Rivers University	Kamloops, British Columbia, Canada	Active	
**Alpha Iota**	April 16, 2016	University of Lethbridge	Lethbridge, Alberta, Canada	Active	(Note: Chapter formed from Kappa Pi Chi (local), established in 2011.)
Alpha Kappa	August 27, 2016 – 2020	SUNY, Stony Brook	New York City, New York	Inactive	
**Alpha Lambda** (see Omicron)	April 9, 2016	Shippensburg University of Pennsylvania	Shippensburg, Pennsylvania	Active	
**Alpha Mu**	December 3, 2016	University of Wisconsin–Green Bay	Green Bay, Wisconsin	Active	
**Alpha Nu**	May 6, 2017	University of Kentucky	Lexington, Kentucky	Active	
**Alpha Xi**	April 8, 2017	University of British Columbia (Okanagan Campus)	Kelowna, British Columbia, Canada	Active	
**Alpha Omicron**	April 29, 2017	University of Ottawa	Ottawa, Ontario, Canada	Active	(Note: Chapter formed from Zeta Theta Epsilon (local), established in 2010.)
**Alpha Pi**	April 29, 2017	Ryerson University	Toronto, Ontario, Canada	Active	(Note: Chapter formed from Delta Phi Nu Gamma Chi (local).)
Alpha Rho	March 24, 2018 – 2020	University of Alabama	Tuscaloosa, Alabama	Inactive	
**Alpha Sigma**	April 21, 2018	Tennessee Wesleyan University	Athens, Tennessee	Active	(Note: Chapter formed from Alpha Xi Gamma (local), established in 1979.)
Alpha Tau	July 14, 2018 – 2025	University of Ontario Institute of Technology	Oshawa, Ontario, Canada	Inactive	
Alpha Upsilon	May 5, 2018 – 202x ?	Southeast Missouri State University	Cape Girardeau, Missouri	Inactive	
Alpha Phi	2018–2019	Pennsylvania State University	University Park, Pennsylvania	Inactive	
Alpha Chi	May 12, 2018 – 2024	St. John's University	Staten Island, New York	Inactive	
Alpha Psi	2018–2019 ?	University of Texas at Austin	Austin, Texas	Inactive	
Alpha Omega				Unassigned	
Beta Alpha	May 4, 2019 – 2022	Middle Georgia State University	Cochran, Georgia	Inactive	
**Beta Beta**	August 25, 2019	State University of New York at Oneonta	Oneonta, New York	Active	
Beta Gamma	2019–2020	University of Hawaiʻi at Mānoa	Honolulu, Hawaii	Inactive	
**Beta Delta**	January 23, 2021	University of Guelph	Guelph, Ontario, Canada	Active	
**Beta Epsilon**	March 27, 2021	University of Waterloo	Waterloo, Ontario, Canada	Active	
**Beta Zeta**	May 15, 2021	Mount Royal University	Calgary, Alberta, Canada	Active	
**Beta Eta**	April 17, 2021	Louisiana State University	Baton Rouge, Louisiana	Active	
**Beta Theta**	April 9, 2022	Kean University	Union, New Jersey	Active	
Beta Iota	January 9, 2022 – 2025	McMaster University	Hamilton, Ontario, Canada	Inactive	
**Beta Kappa**	January 9, 2022	Brock University	St. Catharines, Ontario, Canada	Active	
**Beta Lambda**	October 20, 2024	University of Colorado Boulder	Boulder, Colorado	Active	
Beta Mu	2024–2025	Loras College	Dubuque, Iowa	Inactive	
**Beta Nu**	August 2, 2025	University of Tennessee Southern	Pulaski, Tennessee	Active	
