= List of Delta Sigma Epsilon chapters =

Delta Sigma Epsilon was a national collegiate social sorority founded at Miami University, operating in the United States from 1914 to 1956. The sorority was absorbed by Delta Zeta sorority on August 21, 1956.

Delta Sigma Epsilon chapters were traditionally located on the campuses of normal schools or teachers' colleges. In this list, inactive institutions and chapters are in italics.

Chapter	Charter date and range	Institution	Location	Status	Ref.
Alpha	September 23, 1914 – August 21, 1956	Miami University	Oxford, Ohio	Merged (ΔΖ)	(Note: Chapter was absorbed by an existing Delta Zeta chapter with the national merger of the two sororities.)
Beta	1916–1919; 1928 – August 21, 1956	Indiana University of Pennsylvania	Indiana, Pennsylvania	Merged (ΔΖ)	(Note: Chapter formed from Delta Sigma Club, established in 1915.) (Note: Absorbed a chapter of Pi Delta Theta.)
Gamma	1916 – August 21, 1956	University of Northern Colorado	Greeley, Colorado	Merged (ΔΖ)	(Note: Chapter formed from Phi Sigma Phi (local), established in 1911. Became the Delta Xi chapter of Delta Zeta with the national merger of the two sororities.)
Delta	1916 – August 21, 1956	Northwestern Oklahoma State University	Alva, Oklahoma	Merged (ΔΖ)	(Note: Chapter formed from the Shakespeare Club (local), established in 1902. It became the Delta Omicron chapter of Delta Zeta with the national merger of the two sororities.)
Epsilon	1917 – August 21, 1956	Emporia State University	Emporia, Kansas	Merged (ΔΖ)	(Note: Chapter formed from the local Omega Literary Society, established in 1901. It became the Delta Pi chapter of Delta Zeta with the national merger of the two sororities.)
Zeta	1919 – August 21, 1956	New Mexico Highlands University	Las Vegas, New Mexico	Merged (ΔΖ)	(Note: Chapter formed from Alpha Phi, established in 1919. It became the Delta Rho chapter of Delta Zeta with the national merger of the two sororities.)
Eta	1920 – August 21, 1956	Eastern Michigan University	Ypsilanti, Michigan	Merged (ΔΖ)	
Theta	1920–1956	Pittsburg State University	Pittsburg, Kansas	Inactive	(Note: Chapter formed from Zeta Iota (local), established in 1919.)
Iota	January 31, 1921 – August 21, 1956	Truman State University	Kirksville, Missouri	Merged (ΔΖ)	(Note: Became the Delta Sigma chapter of Delta Zeta with the national merger of the two sororities.)
Kappa	1921 – August 21, 1956	Temple University	Philadelphia, Pennsylvania	Merged (ΔΖ)	(Note: Chapter formed from Phi Delta Gamma. It became the Delta Tau chapter of Delta Zeta with the national merger of the two sororities.)
Lambda	June 14, 1921 – August 21, 1956	Marshall University	Huntington, West Virginia	Merged (ΔΖ)	(Note: Became the Delta Upsilon chapter of Delta Zeta with the national merger of the two sororities.)
Mu	1922–1933	Ohio University	Athens, Ohio	Inactive	
Nu	1922–1951	Western New Mexico University	Silver City, New Mexico	Inactive	
Xi	July 11, 1923 – August 21, 1956	Northeastern State University	Tahlequah, Oklahoma	Merged (ΔΖ)	(Note: Became the Delta Phi chapter of Delta Zeta with the national merger of the two sororities.)
Omicron	1924 – August 21, 1956	California State University, Chico	Chico, California	Merged (ΔΖ)	(Note: Became the Delta Chi chapter of Delta Zeta with the national merger of the two sororities.)
Pi	May 23, 1925 – August 21, 1956	University of California, Santa Barbara	Santa Barbara, California	Merged (ΔΖ)	(Note: Chapter formed from Delta Sigma Pi (local), established in 1924. It became the Delta Psi chapter of Delta Zeta with the national merger of the two sororities.)
Rho	October 3, 1925 – August 21, 1956	Fort Hays State University	Hays, Kansas	Merged (ΔΖ)	(Note: Chapter formed from Alpha Kappa Tau (local), established in 1922. It became the Delta Omega chapter of Delta Zeta with the national merger of the two sororities.)
Sigma	October 9, 1925 – August 21, 1956	Western State College of Colorado	Gunnison, Colorado	Merged (ΔΖ)	(Note: Became the Epsilon Alpha chapter of Delta Zeta with the national merger of the two sororities.)
Tau	February 13, 1926 – 1939	Kent State University	Kent, Ohio	Withdrew	(Note: Chapter formed from Alpha Kappa Phi, established in 1924. Later, it withdrew and became Beta Gamma (local), before joining Alpha Chi Omega.)
Arethusa Upsilon	March 4, 1926 – 1953	Buffalo State College	Buffalo, New York	Withdrew	(Note: Chapter formed from the Zeta chapter of Arethusa/Sigma Gamma Phi, established in 1902. Later, it withdrew and became Delta Sigma Upsilon (local).)
Phi	March 26, 1926 – August 21, 1956	Northwestern State University	Natchitoches, Louisiana	Merged (ΔΖ)	(Note: Chapter formed from the Friendship Club (local), established 1924. It became the Epsilon Beta chapter of Delta Zeta with the national merger of the two sororities.)
Chi	1926–1947	Drake University	Des Moines, Iowa	Inactive	(Note: Chapter formed from the Crescent Club (local), established in 1925.)
Psi	1927 – August 21, 1956	University of Central Missouri	Warrensburg, Missouri	Merged (ΔΖ)	(Note: Chapter formed from Xi Omega (local), established in 1926. It became the Epsilon Gamma chapter of Delta Zeta with the national merger of the two sororities.)
Omega	1928 – August 21, 1956	Concord University	Athens, West Virginia	Merged (ΔΖ)	(Note: Chaptar formed from Tau Omega (local), established in 1922. It became the Epsilon Delta chapter of Delta Zeta with the national merger of the two sororities.)
Alpha Alpha	1928 – August 21, 1956	California State University, Fresno	Fresno, California	Merged (ΔΖ)	(Note: Became the Epsilon Epsilon chapter of Delta Zeta with the national merger of the two sororities.)
Alpha Beta	1928 – August 21, 1956	Drexel University	Philadelphia, Pennsylvania	Merged (ΔΖ)	(Note: Chapter formed from Kappa Delta Gamma, established in 1924. It became the Epsilon Zeta chapter of Delta Zeta with the national merger of the two sororities.)
Alpha Gamma	1928–1935	Teachers College of Indianapolis	Indianapolis, Indiana	Inactive	(Note: Chapter formed from Phi Kappa Theta.) (Note: The college merged with Butler University in 1930)
Alpha Delta	1928 – August 21, 1956	Southern Illinois University Carbondale	Carbondale, Illinois	Withdrew	(Note: Chapter formed from Epsilon Beta (local), established in 1924. Later, it withdrew and became Nu Delta Sigma (local), before joining Alpha Gamma Delta.)
Alpha Epsilon	1930 – August 21, 1956	Harris Teachers College	St. Louis, Missouri	Merged (ΔΖ)	(Note: Chapter formed from Sigma Phi Omega, established in 1928. It became the Epsilon Eta chapter of Delta Zeta with the national merger of the two sororities.)
Alpha Zeta	1932 – August 21, 1956	Clarion University of Pennsylvania	Clarion, Pennsylvania	Merged (ΔΖ)	(Note: Chapter formed from Zeta Kappa Nu, established in 1930. It became the Epsilon Theta chapter of Delta Zeta with the national merger of the two sororities.)
Alpha Eta	1934 –194x ?; 1947 – August 21, 1956	Fairmont State University	Fairmont, West Virginia	Merged (ΔΖ)	(Note: Chapter formed from Beta Psi Beta, established in 1931. It became the Epsilon iota chapter of Delta Zeta with the national merger of the two sororities.)
Alpha Theta	1936 – August 21, 1956	University of Wisconsin Whitewater	Whitewater, Wisconsin	Merged (ΔΖ)	(Note: Became the Epsilon Kappa chapter of Delta Zeta with the national merger of the two sororities.)
Alpha Iota	1939 – August 21, 1956	Southwestern Oklahoma State University	Weatherford, Oklahoma	Merged (ΔΖ)	(Note: Became the Epsilon Lambda chapter of Delta Zeta with the national merger of the two sororities.)
Alpha Kappa	1940 – August 21, 1956	University of Southern Mississippi	Hattiesburg, Mississippi	Merged (ΔΖ)	(Note: Chapter formed from Delta Sigma, established in 1938. It became the Epsilon Mu chapter of Delta Zeta with the national merger of the two sororities.)
Alpha Lambda	1941 – August 21, 1956	Missouri State University	Springfield, Missouri	Merged (ΔΖ)	(Note: Became the Epsilon Nu chapter of Delta Zeta with the national merger of the two sororities.)
Alpha Mu	1941– August 21, 1956	Central Michigan University	Mount Pleasant, Michigan	Merged (ΔΖ)	(Note: Chapter formed from Delta Sigma, established in 1940.)
Alpha Nu	1943 – August 21, 1956	Eastern Illinois University	Charleston, Illinois	Merged (ΔΖ)	(Note: Chapter formed from Chi Delta Gamma, established in 1941.)
Alpha Xi	1944 – August 21, 1956	Arkansas State University	Conway, Arkansas	Merged (ΔΖ)	(Note: Chapter formed from Delta Phi Delta, established in 1931. It became the Epsilon Xi chapter of Delta Zeta with the national merger of the two sororities.)
Alpha Omicron	1944 – August 21, 1956	Northern Illinois University	DeKalb, Illinois	Merged (ΔΖ)	(Note: Chapter formed from Sigma Delta Pi, established in 1938. It merged into the Gamma Rho chapter of Delta Zeta with the national merger of the two sororities.)
Alpha Pi	1944 – August 21, 1956	Ball State University	Muncie, Indiana	Merged (ΔΖ)	(Note: Chapter formed from Phi Delta Sigma, established in 1921.)
Alpha Rho	1945–1952	Southeastern Louisiana University	Hammond, Louisiana	Inactive	(Note: Chapter formed from Pi Kappa Epsilon, established in 1937.)
Alpha Sigma	1946 – August 21, 1956	Western Illinois University	Macomb, Illinois	Merged (ΔΖ)	(Note: Chapter formed from Delta Phi Lambda, established in 1944. It became the Epsilon Omicron chapter of Delta Zeta with the national merger of the two sororities.)
Alpha Tau	1946–1952	Black Hills State University	Spearfish, South Dakota	Inactive	
Alpha Upsilon	1946 – August 21, 1956	Henderson State University	Arkadelphia, Arkansas	Merged (ΔΖ)	(Note: Became the Epsilon Pi chapter of Delta Zeta with the national merger of the two sororities.)
Alpha Phi	1947 – August 21, 1956	Northwest Missouri State University	Maryville, Missouri	Merged (ΔΖ)	(Note: Chapter formed from Phi Zeta Sigma, established in 1937. It became the Epsilon Rho chapter of Delta Zeta with the national merger of the two sororities.)
Alpha Chi	1947 – August 21, 1956	Wayne State University	Detroit, Michigan	Merged (ΔΖ)	(Note: Became the Epsilon SIgma chapter of Delta Zeta with the national merger of the two sororities.)
Alpha Psi	May 1949 – August 21, 1956	Longwood College	Farmville, Virginia	Merged (ΔΖ)	(Note: Became the Epsilon Tau chapter of Delta Zeta with the national merger of the two sororities.)
Alpha Omega	April 22, 1950 – August 21, 1956	University of Central Oklahoma	Edmond, Oklahoma	Merged (ΔΖ)	(Note: Became the Epsilon Upsilon chapter of Delta Zeta with the national merger of the two sororities.)
Beta Alpha	1951 – August 21, 1956	University of California, Berkeley	Berkeley, California	Merged (ΔΖ)	(Note: Chapter formed from Phi Sigma Mu, established in 1950.)
Beta Beta	1952 – August 21, 1956	University of Detroit	Detroit, Michigan	Merged (ΔΖ)	(Note: Chapter formed from Rho Gamma Zeta, established in 1948. It became the Epsilon Phi chapter of Delta Zeta with the national merger of the two sororities.)
Beta Gamma	1953 – August 21, 1956	Marquette University	Milwaukee, Wisconsin	Withdrew	(Note: Chapter formed from Zeta Phi Delta, established in 1930. Later, it withdrew and became Delta Sigma Gamma (local), before joining Alpha Delta Pi.)
Beta Delta	1955 – August 21, 1956	University of Illinois Urbana-Champaign	Champaign, Illinois	Merged (ΔΖ)	
Beta Epsilon	February 1956 – August 21, 1956	Saint Louis University	St. Louis, Missouri	Merged (ΔΖ)	(Note: Chapter formed from the Beta Club (local), established in 1955. It became the Epsilon Psi chapter of Delta Zeta with the national merger of the two sororities.)
Beta Zeta	February 1956 – August 21, 1956	University of Wisconsin–Eau Claire	Eau Claire, Wisconsin	Merged (ΔΖ)	(Note: Became Epsilon Omega chapter of Delta Zeta with the national merger of the two sororities.)
