= Lambda Omega =

Defunct American collegiate sorority

- ΛΩ
- Founded: October 31, 1915; 110 years ago University of California, Berkeley
- Type: Social
- Former affiliation: NPC
- Status: Merged
- Merge date: September 1933
- Successor: Theta Upsilon
- Scope: National
- Motto: "I Will Be Worthy"
- Member badge
- Colors: Violet and Green
- Symbol: Quiver and torch
- Flower: Wood violet
- Jewel: Amethyst
- Patron Greek deity: Artemis
- Publication: The Pharetra
- Chapters: 10
- Members: 1,000 lifetime
- Former name: Norroena Club
- Headquarters: United States

Lambda Omega (ΛΩ) was an America college sorority. It was established at the University of California, Berkeley, as the Norroena Club in 1915. It changed its name to Greek letters in 1923 when it became a national organization. It absorbed Alpha Sigma Delta in 1932.

The sorority established ten chapters before it merged into Theta Upsilon in 1933. It was an associate member of the National Panhellenic Conference.

== History ==
The Norroena Club was founded on October 31, 1915 on the Campus of the University of California, Berkeley. It was established by Ethel Flood and Grace Palmer, transfer students seeking a way to make friends. Its founding members were Flossie Banks, Stella Chappell, Helen Coursen, Sarah Fairchild, Ethel Flood, Annette Girard, Fannie Granger, Fin Hahn, Maude Hudson, Florence Koehler, Louise Koehler, Barbara Mensing, Maude Miller, Grace Palmer, Estha Rodkey, and Anne Wallingford.

The Norroena Club remained a local sorority for seven years. Its name meant "Breath of the North". Its ritual combined a Native American legend with a Norse motif. The motif emphasized the hardihood, hospitality, economy, and friendship of the Norse.

On May 5, 1923, the name changed to Lambda Omega, becoming the Alpha chapter of a new national sorority. Lambda Omega celebrated Founder's Day on May 5, coinciding with the name change. Expansion began immediately. with chapters being established at the University of Illinois in 1923 and Ohio State University in 1924. Alpha also purchased a chapter house in 1923.

In 1929, Lambda Omega had seven chapters and had initiated 453 members. Nationally, the sorority's philanthropy was the Children's Hospital in Chicago, Illinois.

By 1931, it had chartered eight collegiate chapters, with a total membership of 500. In June 1931, it held a convention in Columbus, Ohio.

The sorority was granted associate membership in the National Panhellenic Conference.

In April 1932, it absorbed Alpha Sigma Delta, a four chapter sorority. In September 1933, Lambda Omega was absorbed by Theta Upsilon. In turn, Theta Upsilon merged into Delta Zeta in 1962.

== Symbols ==
Lambda Omega's insignia was a pharetra (quiver) and a torch. Its motto was "I Will Be Worthy".

The sorority's badge was a monogram of the Greek letters "ΛΩ" in Roman gold, with the "Λ" over the "Ω" and decorated with pearls. Its pledge pin was a small silver pharetra holding arrows.

Lambda Omega's colors were violet and green. Its flag consisted of two violet sections and two green sections. The Greek letters "ΛΩ" were in the violet section in silver, while the green sections bore the torch.

The sorority's flower was the wood violet. Its jewel was the amethyst. Its patron Greek deity was Artemis. Lambda Omega's publication was The Pharetra, first published in 1925.

== Governance ==
The sorority was governed through a national convention that was held biennially. During the convention, its national officiers were selected, including president, vice-president, secretary, treasurer, editor, historian, and ritualist.

== Chapters ==
In the following list of Lambda Omega changers, inactive chapters noted in italics.

Chapter	Charter date and rang	Institution	Location	Status	Ref.
Alpha	May 5, 1923 – September 1933	University of California, Berkeley	Berkeley, California	Merged (ΘΥ)	(Note: Chapter originated as the Norroena Club on October 31, 1915, and changed its name in 1923. It absorbed the Alpha chapter of Alpha Sigma Delta in April 1932. It joined the Alpha chapter of Theta Upsilon with the national merger of the two sororities.)
Beta	1923 – September 1933	University of Illinois	Urbana, Illinois	Merged (ΘΥ)	(Note: The chapter was formed from Beta Phi Epsilon (local), established in 1922. It absorbed a chapter of Alpha Sigma Delta when that sorority merged into ΛΩ in April 1932. It joined the Gamma chapter of Theta Upsilon with the national merger of the two sororities.)
Gamma	1924 – September 1933	Ohio State University	Columbus, Ohio	Merged (ΘΥ)	(Note: Chapter formed from Sigma Sigma Gamma (local), established in 1923. It merged into the Delta chapter of Theta Upsilon with the national merger of the two sororities.)
Delta	1925 – September 1933	Ohio University	Athens, Ohio	Merged (ΘΥ)	(Note: Chapter formed from Sigma Beta Upsilon (local), established in 1924. It joined the Kappa chapter of Theta Upsilon with the national merger of the two sororities.)
Epsilon	1927 – September 1933	Northwestern University	Evanston, Illinois	Merged (ΘΥ)	(Note: Chapter became the Epsilon Alpha chapter of Theta Upsilon with the national merger of the two sororities.)
Zeta	1928 – September 1933	University of California, Los Angeles	Los Angeles, California	Merged (ΘΥ)	(Note: Chapter joined the Omicron chapter of Theta Upsilon, with the national merger of the two sororities.)
Eta	1929 – September 1933	University of Washington	Seattle, Washington	Merged (ΘΥ)	(Note: Chapter formed from Delta Omicron Chi (local), established in 1923. It joined the Rho chapter of Theta Upsilon withe national merger of the two sororities.)
Theta	1930 – September 1933	University of Denver	Denver, Colorado	Merged (ΘΥ)	(Note: Joined the Zeta Alpha chapter of Theta Upsilon with the national merger of the two sororities.)
Iota	April 1932 – September 1933	Colby College	Waterville, Maine	Merged (ΘΥ)	(Note: Formed from a chapter of Alpha Sigma Delta, acquired from the national merger of the two sororities.) (Note: Became the Theta Alpha chapter of Theta Upsilon with the national merger of the two sororities.)
Kappa	April 1932 – September 1933	University of Utah	Salt Lake City, Utah	Merged (ΘΥ)	(Note: Became the Eta Alpha chapter of Theta Upsilon with the national merger of the two sororities.)

== See also ==
- List of social sororities and women's fraternities
