= Alpha Sigma Delta =

Alpha Sigma Delta may refer to:

- Alpha Sigma Delta fraternity, a men's social fraternity at Miller-Motte College.
- Alpha Sigma Delta fraternity, a defunct men's social fraternity at American International College.
- Alpha Sigma Delta Radio Society - W5TC, an amateur radio society at the University of Oklahoma.
- Alpha Sigma Delta (sorority), a defunct national sorority that merged into Lambda Omega.
- Alpha Sigma Delta (Oakwood), a defunct Christian African American women's sorority
- Alpha Sigma Delta (SUNY), a women's social sorority at SUNY Brockport.
