= Sigma Sigma Omicron =

American college sorority (1920–1933)

- ΣΣΟ
- Founded: November 1, 1920; 105 years ago New York University
- Type: Social
- Former affiliation: NPC
- Status: Merged
- Merge date: October 1, 1933
- Successor: Phi Omega Pi
- Scope: Regional
- Colors: Purple and White
- Flower: Violets with White Rose
- Jewel: Amethyst and Pearl
- Publication: The Talaria
- Chapters: 15 chartered
- Members: 1,000 lifetime
- Other names: Sigma Phi Beta
- Headquarters: United States

Sigma Sigma Omicron (ΣΣΟ), also known as Sigma Phi Beta (ΣΦΒ), was an American college sorority. It was established at New York University in New York City, New York in 1920. It changed its name to Sigma Phi Beta in 1927 and merged with Phi Alpha Chi in 1928. Sigma Phi Beta merged into Phi Omega Pi in 1933.

== History ==
=== Sigma Sigma Omicron ===
Sigma Sigma Omicron was formed on November 1, 1920 at New York University in New York City, New York. Its primary founder was Vera Bartone Goelier, supported by other students of the junior, sophomore, and freshman classes.

Gamma chapter was installed at Hunter University in April 1921, followed by Zeta chapter at Newark State Teachers College in May. By 1927, it had chartered nine chapters, mainly at teachers' colleges. Eventually, some of those chapters lost their charter because the National Panhellenic Conference did not allow its member sororities to have chapters at normal schools.

=== Sigma Phi Beta ===
Sigma Sigma Omicron changed its name to Sigma Phi Beta on July 28, 1927. The reason for this name change was unknown but coincided with merger discussions with Phi Alpha Chi. It merged with the three chapters of Phi Alpha Chi on January 7, 1928 after "having found their interests and purposes similar". The Alpha chapters of the two sororities were renamed New York Alpha (Sigma Sigma Omicron) and California Alpha (Phi Alpha Chi) with the merger. The other chapters retained their names except for the Gamma chapter of Phi Alpha Chi, which became the Delta chapter of Sigma Phi Beta.

Sigma Phi Beta held its first biennial national convention on June 21–24, 1929 in New York City, New York. In 1929, it had ten alumnae clubs. In 1931, it had ten active chapters, with 1,000 members. It eventually chartered fifteen chapters. It was an associate member of the National Panhellenic Conference. On October 1, 1933, Sigma Phi Beta merged into Phi Omega Pi, which itself was partly absorbed by Delta Zeta in 1946, with some chapters disbanded or released to other sororities.

== Symbols ==
Sigma Phi Beta badge

The insignia of Sigma Sigma Omicron consists of a circle, helmet, pyramid, sabre, and a sheaf of wheat.

The sorority's membership badge is a "pearl bordered circular shield of purple enamel, displaying sorority letters in gold, and jeweled additionally with six amethysts set at prescribed points outside a circlet of pearls". This description is accurate for both Sigma Sigma Omicron and Sigma Phi Beta, with the difference being the Greek letters in gold on the purple enamel. Its pledge pin is a "crescented Norman shield divided vertically into two equal sections, one enameled in purple, the other in white, and displaying diagonally a gold sabre".

Sigma Sigma Omicron's colors were purple and white. Its flowers were violets with a white rose. Its jewels were amethyst and pearl. The sorority's publication was The Talaria.

== Chapters ==
=== Sigma Sigma Omicron ===
Following are the chapters of Sigma Sigma Omicron, with inactive chapters and institutions indicated in italics.

Chapter	Charter date and range	Institution	Location	Status	Ref.
Alpha	November 1, 1920 – January 7, 1928	New York University Washington Square	New York City, New York	Merged (ΣΦΒ)	, (Note: Became the New York Alpha chapter of Sigma Phi Beta with the national merger of the two sororities.)
Beta	1921–19xx ?	Teachers College of New York City	New York City, New York	Inactive	
Gamma	April 1921 – January 7, 1928	Hunter College	New York City, New York	Merged (ΣΦΒ)	
Epsilon	1921 – January 7, 1928	Montclair State Teachers College	Montclair, New Jersey	Merged (ΣΦΒ)	(Note: Chapter formed at the New Jersey State Normal School at Montclair, which became Montclair State Teachers College is 1927. It is now Montclair State University.)
Zeta	May 1921 – June 1926	Newark State Teachers College	Union Township, New Jersey	Inactive	(Note: Chapter was removed because normal schools were not eligible for membership in National Panhellenic Congress organizations.)
Eta	1923–1924	Syracuse University	Syracuse, New York	Inactive	
Theta	April 25, 1924 – January 7, 1928	Wittenberg College	Springfield, Ohio	Merged (ΣΦΒ)	(Note: This chapter originated as Sigma Pi Delta (local) in 1920.)
Iota	1924–1927	Howard College	Birmingham, Alabama	Inactive	(Note: This chapter originated as Lambda Xi Delta (local) in 1922.)
Kappa	January 30, 1925 – January 7, 1928	Hamilton College	Lexington, Kentucky	Merged (ΣΦΒ)	(Note: This chapter originated as a local sorority in 1919.)

=== Sigma Phi Beta ===
Following are the chapters of Sigma Phi Beta, with inactive chapters indicated in italics.

Chapter	Charter date and range	Institution	Location	Status	Ref.
New York Alpha	November 1, 1920 – October 1, 1933	New York University	New York City, New York	Merged (ΦΩΠ)	, (Note: Became Alpha Zeta chapter of Phi Omega Pi with the national merger of the two sororities.)
Gamma	April 1921 – October 1, 1933	Hunter College	New York City, New York	Merged (ΦΩΠ)	(Note: Became the NY Gamma chapter of Phi Omega Pi with the national merger of the two sororities.)
Epsilon	1921 – October 1, 1933	Montclair State Teachers College	Montclair, New Jersey	Merged (ΦΩΠ)	(Note: Chapter formed at the New Jersey State Normal School at Montclair, which became Montclair State Teachers College is 1927. It is now Montclair State University. Although this chapter merged with Phi Omega Pi, it was immediately placed on the inactive list by order of the National Panhellenic Congress when Phi Omega Pi joined it in 1933.)
Theta	April 25, 1924 – October 1, 1933	Wittenberg College	Springfield, Ohio	Merged (ΦΩΠ)	(Note: This chapter originated as Sigma Pi Delta (local) in 1920. It became the Omega chapter of Phi Omega Pi with the national merger of the two sororities.)
Kappa	January 30, 1925 – October 1, 1933	Transylvania University	Lexington, Kentucky	Merged (ΦΩΠ)	(Note: This chapter originated as a local sorority in 1919 at Hamilton College, an affiliate campus of Transylvania University. It became the Alpha Alpha chapter of Phi Omega Pi with the national merger of the two sororities.)
California Alpha	January 7, 1928 – October 1, 1933	University of California	Berkeley, California	Merged (ΦΩΠ)	(Note: This chapter originated as the Alpha chapter of Phi Alpha Chi in 1925; before that it was the local sorority Tanewah in 1919. It merged with the Lambda chapter of Phi Omega Pi, with the national merger of the two sororities.)
Beta	January 7, 1928 – 1931	Ohio State University	Columbus, Ohio	Inactive	(Note: This chapter originated as the Beta chapter of Phi Alpha Chi in 1926.)
Delta	January 7, 1928 – October 1, 1933	Alabama Polytechnic Institute	Auburn, Alabama	Merged (ΦΩΠ)	(Note: This chapter originated as the Gamma chapter of Phi Alpha Chi in 1927. It became the Psi chapter of Phi Omega Pi with the national merger of the two sororities.)
Lambda	1929 – October 1, 1933	University of Illinois	Champaign, Illinois	Merged (ΦΩΠ)	(Note: Joined the existing Gamma chapter of Phi Omega Pi with the national merger of the two sororities)
Mu ?	1930 – October 1, 1933	University of California at Los Angeles	Los Angeles, California	Merged (ΦΩΠ)	(Note: Joined the existing Sigma chapter of Phi Omega Pi with the national merger of the two sororities.)
Nu	1930 – October 1, 1933	Utah State Agricultural College	Logan, Utah	Merged (ΦΩΠ)	(Note: This chapter originated as Gamma Xi Gamma (local) in 1920. It became the Alpha Beta chapter of Phi Omega Pi with the national merger of the two sororities.)

== See also ==
- College fraternities and sororities
- List of social sororities and women's fraternities
