= Alpha Sigma Delta (sorority) =

American collegiate sorority (1915–1932)

- ΑΣΔ
- Founded: 1918; 108 years ago University of California, Berkeley
- Type: Social
- Affiliation: Independent
- Status: Merged
- Merge date: April 1932
- Successor: Lambda Omega
- Scope: National
- Member badge
- Colors: Gold and White
- Publication: The Crown
- Chapters: 4
- Headquarters: United States

Alpha Sigma Delta (ΑΣΔ) was an American collegiate sorority that formed in 1918 at University of California, Berkeley. It was absorbed by Lambda Omega in April 1932.

== History ==
Alpha Sigma Delta started as a sorority called the Iaqua Club at University of California, Berkeley in 1918. Iaqua Club changed its name to Alpha Sigma Delta in 1919.

In 1925, Alpha Sigma Delta became a regional sorority with the creation of its Beta chapter at the University of California, Los Angeles. It became a national sorority in 1928 with the chartering of the Gamma chapter at Colby College in Waterville, Maine. A total of five chapters were established; although only the names of four are known.

In April 1932, Alpha Sigma Delta was absorbed by Lambda Omega (ΛΩ), another sorority that was also established at the University of California, Berkeley. In September 1933, Lambda Omega was absorbed by Theta Upsilon. In turn, Theta Upsilon merged into Delta Zeta in 1962.

== Symbols ==
Alpha Sigma Delta's badge was a shield of red enamel, bearing the Greek letters ΑΣΔ, vertically. The sorority's colors were gold and white. Its quarterly magazine was The Crown.

== Chapters ==
The known chapter list follows, with inactive chapters noted in italics.

Chapter	Charter date and range	Institution	Location	Status	Ref.
Alpha	1918–April 1932	University of California, Berkeley	Berkeley, California	Merged (ΛΩ)	(Note: Chapter formed as the Iaqua Club (local) in 1918 and before changing its name to ΑΣΔ in 1919. It merged into the Alpha chapter of Lambda Omega with the national merger of the two sororities.)
Beta	1925–April 1932	University of California, Los Angeles	Los Angeles, California	Merged (ΛΩ)	(Note: Chapter formed from Alpha Zeta Chi (local), established in 1924. It merged into the Zeta chapter of Lambda Omega with the national merger of the two sororities.)
Gamma	1928–April 1932	Colby College	Waterville, Maine	Merged (ΛΩ)	(Note: Chapter formed from Beta Chi Theta (local), established in 1923. It became the Iota chapter of Lambda Omega with the national merger of the two sororities.)
Delta	1929–April 1932	University of Utah	Salt Lake City, Utah	Merged (ΛΩ)	(Note: Chapter formed from Kappa Chi (local), established in 1926. It became the Kappa chapter of Lambda Omega with the national merger of the two sororities.)
