= Mercedes Allison Bates =

American businesswoman (1915–1997)

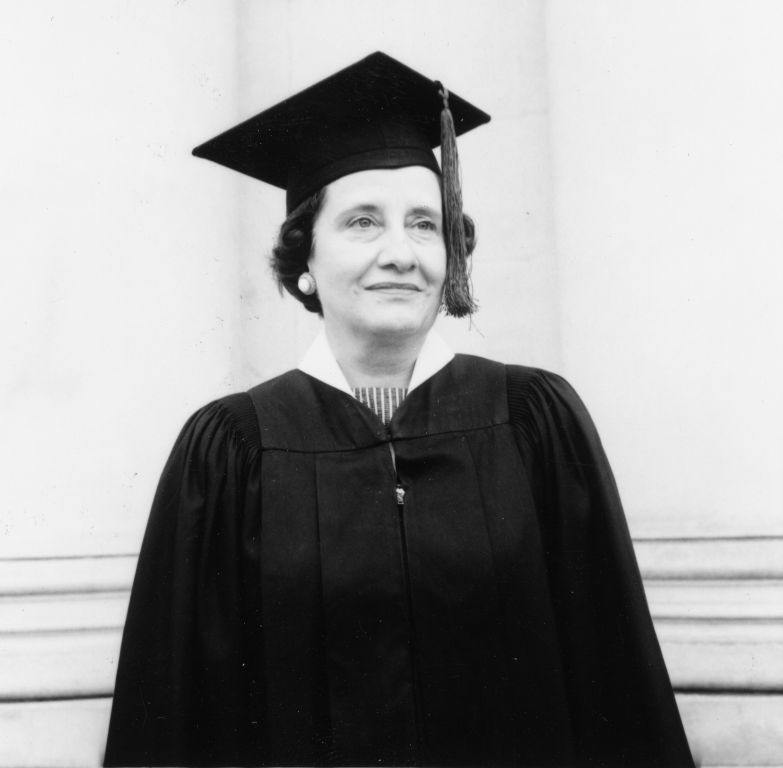
Mercedes Bates at Oregon State University, 1969

Mercedes Allison Bates (September 14, 1915 – August 16, 1997) was an American magazine editor and businesswoman who was most famous for her involvement in General Mills, specifically as the director of the Betty Crocker division.

Bates was born in Portland, Oregon in September 1915. she graduated with a degree in Health and Human Sciences in 1936 from Oregon State University. Bates was also a member of the Delta Zeta sorority.

Post graduation, Bates had a storied job history. She started working at Southern California Gas Company as a supervisor of home services. From there she began to work at Globe Mills food, which led her to start her own venture in Hollywood as an advertising food consultant. McCall's magazine recognized her understanding of family values, their strengths and weaknesses and hired her as the food editor. In 1964, Mercedes Bates became the director of the Betty Crocker division of General Mills. By 1966 she was vice president of the division, making her the first woman officer at General Mills. She held this position until 1983 when she retired.

Because of her involvement with the Betty Crocker division and her desire to make the food industry recognize family values, Bates received the nickname of "Betty Crocker."

Bates died on August 16, 1997, at the age of 81.
