= Zelta Feike Rodenwold =

American home economist

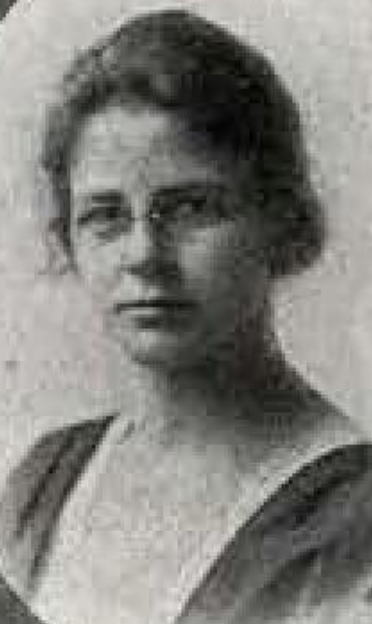
- Zelta Feike, from the 1919 yearbook of Oregon State University
- Born: Zelta Fern Feike; January 3, 1895; Bayard, Iowa, U.S.
- Died: June 14, 1987 (aged 92); Portland, Oregon, U.S.
- Occupations: Home economist, editor, broadcaster

Zelta Fern Feike Rodenwold (January 3, 1895 – June 14, 1987) was an American home economist, editor, and broadcaster. She was director of women's programs at KOAC radio in Oregon, and an information specialist with the Bureau of Home Economics in Washington, D.C. She was editor of the Journal of Home Economics.

== Early life and education ==
Feike was born in Bayard, Iowa, the daughter of Ferdinand Boyd Feike and Anna Belle Peterson Feike. Her father ran a furniture store. She went to high school in Oklahoma, attended Drake University in Iowa, and graduated from Oregon State University (OSU) in 1919. In 1969 she was recognized with the OSU Outstanding Graduate Award. She was a member of the Delta Zeta sorority. In 1975, Delta Zeta chapter at OSU honored Rodenwold as their first initiate and first chapter president.

She earned a master's degree from Iowa State College in 1929.

== Career ==
She was secretary of the School of Home Economics at OSU from 1919 to 1921. She was manager of the Oregon State University Alumni Association from 1921 to 1926, and founding editor the association's magazine. From 1930 to 1946, Rodenwold was director of women's programs at KOAC-AM in Corvallis, Oregon, and was heard daily giving home economics advice to listeners. She gave talks to women's groups in Oregon.

In 1946 Rodenwold became editor of the Journal of Home Economics, official publication of the American Home Economics Association. In the 1950s, as an information specialist with the USDA's Bureau of Home Economics, she was based in Washington, D.C. She gave demonstrations to women's groups, and appeared in educational films about food preparation. In 1953 she represented the United States at the Home Economics Association meeting in Edinburgh.

== Publications ==
- Woman's Career Through Training in Home Economics (1927)
- "The Vocational Guidance Movement in Oregon" (1928)
- "Introducing Home Economics into the Orient" (1928)
- "Balanced Diet by Suggestion" (1929)
- "The Homemaker's Bookshelf" (1929)
- What can a woman do with home economics training (1930)

== Personal life ==
Feike married Benjamin William Rodenwold in 1924. He was a professor of animal husbandry at OSU, and he died in 1943. She died in 1987, at the age of 92, in Portland.
