= Omega Epsilon Sigma =

American college sorority (1925–1930)

- ΩΕΣ
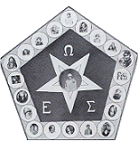
- The 1928 ΩΕΣ crest used by Gamma chapter
- Founded: January 3, 1925; 101 years ago University of Central Missouri
- Type: Social
- Affiliation: Order of the Eastern Star
- Status: Defunct
- Defunct date: c. 1930
- Emphasis: Eastern Star
- Scope: Regional
- Member badge
- Colors: Green and White
- Flower: Narcissus and white rose
- Chapters: 5
- Headquarters: United States

Omega Epsilon Sigma (ΩΕΣ) was a collegiate sorority operating in the United States from 1925 until, approximately, 1930. It is the second known organization for college women with Order of the Eastern Star affiliation, the first being Achoth.

== History ==
=== Omicron Epsilon Sigma ===
Omega Epsilon Sigma was founded as Omicron Epsilon Sigma on January 3, 1925, at Central Missouri State Teachers College (now University of Central Missouri). The 1925 edition of the Sunflower Yearbook described the sorority's membership policy as "eligibility to membership in this organization is based upon affiliation with the Order of the Eastern Star."

On April 21, 1925, the sorority was recognized by the Grand Matron of the Grand Chapter of Kansas. The yearbook also described the Masonic Association. "Through the kindness of the Shriners of Emporia semi-monthly meetings are held in the Shrine room of the Masonic Temple. Although yet in its infancy Omicron has a large membership and is exerting a democratic influence on the campus." According to the yearbook, Omicron's purpose "is to promote friendship among the girls of the school who are members of this fraternal order."

=== Omega Epsilon Sigma ===
It appears there was a consolidation of several other Eastern Star-affiliated locals shortly after the formation of Omicron Epsilon Sigma. An undated copy of the constitution and bylaws noted the change to Omega Epsilon Sigma.

The purpose was "to inspire each member to grow in strength and beauty of character by emphasizing the living as well as the teaching of moral principles; to strength existing fraternal relations through college fellowship, also to promote high ideals of scholarship and social relations."

While some of its chapters appear to have continued after 1927, that year, the first two chapters withdrew, soon becoming chapters of Theta Sigma Upsilon, which later merged with Alpha Gamma Delta.

== Symbols ==
The colors of Omicron Epsilon Sigma were yellow and white. Its flower was the snapdragon. When it became Omega Epsilon Sigma, its colors were changed to green and white, and the flower changed to the growing narcissus and white rose. Its badge is described as a "regular pentagon bordered with pearls, five on a side surrounding a field of black, in the center of which is a gold five-pointed star which points downward with an emerald in its center; above the star, the letter Ω in gold and at the bottom on either side of the fifth point, the letters, Ε and Σ in gold." Its pledge pin was a gold pentagon, with the letter Omega engraved at top, above the letters Epsilon and Sigma.

== Chapters ==
Following is a list of chapters for Omega Epsilon Sigma.

Chapter	Charter date and range	Institution	Location	Status	Ref.
Alpha	1923–1927	University of Central Missouri	Warrensburg, Missouri	Withdrew (ΘΣΥ)	(Note: This group would later exit to become Omega Sigma (local), would join Theta Sigma Upsilon as its Nu chapter in 1928. It became the Epsilon Lambda chapter of Alpha Gamma Delta in 1959 when Theta Sigma Upsilon merged with that larger sorority.)
Beta	1925–1927	Fort Hays State University	Hays, Kansas	Withdrew (ΘΣΥ)	(Note: This group would later exit to become Zeta Sigma Phi (local), and would join Theta Sigma Upsilon as its Mu chapter in 1929. It became the Epsilon Mu chapter of Alpha Gamma Delta in 1959 when Theta Sigma Upsilon merged with that larger sorority.)
Gamma	1926–1929	Pittsburg State University	Pittsburg, Kansas	Inactive	(Note: Is there a connection to ΘΣΥ's Epsilon chapter, dating to 1924, which had originally been Theta Sigma (local), a group that dated from 1923, which became a chapter of ΑΓΔ in 1959?)
Delta	1927–19xx ?	Emporia State University	Emporia, Kansas	Inactive	(Note: The Delta chapter dates from 1925 when it formed as Omicron Epsilon Sigma. This influenced the decision to name the 5-chapter organization Omega Epsilon Sigma in what may be conjectured the consolidation of ~1927.)
Epsilon	1925–19xx ?	University of Northern Colorado	Greeley, Colorado	Inactive	

== See also ==
- Achoth (became Phi Omega Pi)
- Order of the Eastern Star
