= Mary Hill Fulstone =

American physician

Dr. Mary Hill Fulstone
- (undated)
- Born: August 3, 1892; Eureka, Nevada
- Died: December 2, 1987 (aged 95); Smith Valley, Nevada
- Education: University of California, Berkeley (undergraduate and medical school)
- Occupation: Physician
- Known for: Longest-practicing physician in Nevada
- Awards: Nevada's Mother of the Year (1950); Nevada's Doctor of the Year (1961); Distinguished Nevadan (University of Nevada, 1964)

Dr. Mary Hill Fulstone (August 3, 1892 – December 2, 1987) was an American physician. When she retired from practicing medicine at the age of 91, she was the longest-practicing physician in the state of Nevada. She was born in Eureka, and graduated from University of California, Berkeley (undergraduate and medical school). Known as "Dr. Mary", Fulstone was honored as Nevada's Mother of the Year (1950), Nevada's Doctor of the Year (1961), and Distinguished Nevadan (University of Nevada, 1964). She died on December 2, 1987, at her Smith Valley home.
