= Theta Upsilon =

American collegiate women's fraternity (1921–1962)

- ΘΥ
- Founded: January 1, 1914; 112 years ago University of California, Berkeley
- Type: Social
- Former affiliation: NPC
- Status: Merged
- Merge date: May 6, 1962
- Successor: Delta Zeta
- Scope: National
- Motto: "Let there be light"
- Member badge
- Colors: Red, Orange, Yellow; Green, Cyan, Blue, and Violet
- Symbol: Rising Sun, Rainbow
- Flower: Iris
- Tree: Bay tree
- Mascot: Lion Rampant
- Patron Greek deity: Apollo
- Publication: The Dial
- Chapters: 38
- Headquarters: United States

Theta Upsilon (ΘΥ) was a national women's fraternity operating in the United States from February 1921 until May 1962, when the group was absorbed by the Delta Zeta sorority.

== History ==
=== Local club ===
Theta Upsilon began as a local club at the University of California, Berkeley when six female students moved into a house on Walnut Street. The house became known as "The Walnut Shell".

In the academic year of 1913–1914, twelve girls organized an official "house club" under the university. It was called Mekatina, which meant "Among the Hills". Mekatina had a ritual based on Native American themes. The pin was a rising sun. The formal founding date, according to Delta Zeta's history, was January 1, 1914.

=== National fraternity ===
On February 7, 1921, the Mekatina students renamed themselves inaugural members of the Alpha chapter of Theta Upsilon. Ida Shaw Martin, of the Sorority Service Bureau, is credited with outlining the plans for Theta Upsilon and perfecting its ritual.

Theta Upsilon would eventually install 38 chapters across the country. It benefited, too, from mergers with smaller groups. Early in its history, the fraternity merged with Lambda Omega sorority, which only the year prior had absorbed Alpha Sigma Delta sorority. Lambda Omega had begun as the Norroena club at Berkeley in 1915. Its name meant "Breath of the North," with a ritual based on Native American and Norse values. The Norse values emphasized were hardihood, hospitality, economy, and friendship. Lambda Omega was an associate member of the National Panhellenic Conference. In 1932, Lambda Omega had absorbed Alpha Sigma Delta, which began as the Iaqua club, also at Berkeley in 1919. In 1932, Lambda Omega was, in turn, absorbed by Theta Upsilon.

The chapter at Berkeley, therefore, was the product of three Alpha chapters of small national sororities, prior to itself merging into Delta Zeta's Mu chapter in 1962.

=== Merger with Delta Zeta ===
On May 6, 1962, Theta Upsilon fraternity was officially absorbed by Delta Zeta sorority. The ceremony was held at the Alpha Alpha chapter house at Northwestern University. Delta Zeta gained nine new collegiate chapters while several others were enhanced by mergers.

== Symbols ==
- The flower was the iris.
- The tree was the bay tree.
- The patron was Apollo.
- The official motto: Let there be light
- The magazine was The Dial
- The colors were the Rainbow tints
- Insignia were Rising Sun, Rainbow, Lion Rampant
- The crest included a rampant lion on a rising sun, with a banner at the bottom with the Greek or Roman letters A, E, and I.

== Seven Degrees of Membership ==
(Per Delta Zeta's history)

- Rainbow Degree: pledge ceremony; new members received rainbow ribbons
- Iris Degree: second pledge ceremony; pledge pin of sterling silver fleur-de-lis received
- Covenant Degree: initiation degree, "full lifetime membership"; received official badge of "a pearled Θ superimposed upon Υ"
- Temple Degree: awarded to alumnae at national convention; distinguished those who "supported and cooperated with the national fraternity"
- Laurel Degree: awarded to Temple degree members who showed "outstanding service"; given at National Convention
- Mother/Patroness Degree: awarded to mothers of initiates, patronesses of college chapters, and housemothers.
- Honorary Patron: awarded by college chapters to any man who made an outstanding contribution to the fraternity; approved by the National Council

== Creed ==
"As a daughter of light, I believe in loyalty to God, the Light of all our being; in loyalty to our country, the land of opportunity and freedom, where all women have important roles to play; in loyalty to our fellowmen with whom I shall seek constantly understanding and true love.

"I believe in love, learning, and labor, bearing in mind that each is incomplete without the other- true love expressed through intelligence, service, learning acquired as a result of loving interest in others, and labor inspired by love and guided by intelligence.

"I believe in Theta Upsilon, its purposes, its ideals, and its aspirations. I pledge my heart, my head, and my hand to be a good citizen on the campus and in the community, to cooperate in all endeavors, to maintain high ideals in social life, to uphold a worthy standard in harmony with my sisters in Theta Upsilon, that together we may work to further the divine plan for all mankind."
-- Beatrice Card Fuller.

== Chapters ==
Theta Upsilon had installed a total of 38 chapters by the time of the merger, counting its own and those it absorbed from Lambda Omega.

In 1962 there were four "overlaps" in chapters at California, Miami, Illinois, and Temple universities. These merged into existing Delta Zeta chapters on their respective campuses. Fairly early, a chapter at Ripon College reverted to its local name. Thirty years later, it would become an Alpha Phi chapter. A chapter at Utah State University reverted to its local name, briefly, before becoming a Delta Delta Delta chapter.

Chapters active at the time of the ΔΖ merger are those in bold, those which were inactive are noted in italics.

Chapter	Charter date and range	Institution	Location	Status	Ref.
**Alpha**	1914 – May 6, 1962	University of California, Berkeley	Berkeley, California	Merged (ΔΖ)	(Note: Chapter formed from the Mekatina Club, established in 1909. Later, it absorbed the Alpha chapter of three sororities: Gamma Omega established in 1915, Alpha Sigma Delta established in 1918, and Omega Upsilon established in 1914. At the time of the national merger, the chapter joined the Mu chapter of Delta Zeta.)
Beta	1921–1938	Brenau University	Gainesville, Georgia	Inactive	
**Gamma**	1923–1940; 1946 – May 6, 1962	University of Illinois	Champaign, Illinois	Merged (ΔΖ)	(Note: At the time of the national merger, the chapter joined the Alpha Beta chapter of Delta Zeta)
Delta	1923–1940, 1946–1952	Ohio State University	Columbus, Ohio	Inactive	(Note: Chapter formed from Sigma Phi Omega (local), established in 1921.)
Epsilon	1923–1933	Washington State University	Pullman, Washington	Inactive	(Note: Chapter formed from Sigma Upsilon (local).)
Zeta	1923–1936	Ohio Wesleyan University	Delaware, Ohio	Inactive	(Note: Chapter formed from Zeta Chi (local), established in 1922.)
Eta	1924–1955	Allegheny College	Meadville, Pennsylvania	Inactive	
Theta	1924–1936	Boston University	Boston, Massachusetts	Inactive	
**Iota**	1924 – May 6, 1962	Simpson College	Indianola, Iowa	Merged (ΔΖ)	(Note: Chapter formed from Beta Xi (local), established in 1924. At the time of the national merger, the chapter became the Theta Alpha chapter of Delta Zeta)
Kappa	1925–1939	Ohio University	Athens, Ohio	Inactive	(Note: Chapter formed from Alpha Iota Pi (local), established in 1922.)
Lambda	1925–1939	Florida State University	Tallahassee, Florida	Inactive	
**Mu**	1925 – May 6, 1962	Miami University	Oxford, Ohio	Merged (ΔΖ)	(Note: Chapter formed from Kappa Psi Delta (local), established in 1922. At the time of the national merger, the chapter joined the Alpha chapter of Delta Zeta)
Nu	1925–1928	Ripon College	Ripon, Wisconsin	Withdrew (local)	(Note: At the time of the national merger, the chapter withdrew and became Kappa Sigma Chi (local). Later, it became the Gamma Psi chapter of Alpha Phi.)
**Xi**	1926 – May 6, 1962	Birmingham–Southern College	Birmingham, Alabama	Merged (ΔΖ)	(Note: Chapter formed from Alpha Alpha Alpha (local), established in 1922. At the time of the national merger, the chapter became the Theta Beta chapter of Delta Zeta)
Omicron	1927–1961	University of California, Los Angeles	Los Angeles, California	Inactive	(Note: Chapter formed from Omega Delta Pi (local), established in 1922.)
Pi	1928–1930	Lombard College	Galesburg, Illinois	Inactive	(Note: Lombard College ceased operations in 1930.)
Rho	1929–1940, 1946–1952	University of Washington	Seattle, Washington	Inactive	(Note: Chapter formed from the "E.T.A. Club" (local), established in 1927.)
Sigma	1930–1957	Utah State University	Logan, Utah	Withdrew (local)	(Note: Chapter formed from Zeta Chi (local), established in 1922. At the time of the national merger, the chapter withdrew and reverted to Zeta Chi (local). Later, it became the Phi Pi chapter of Delta Delta Delta.)
**Tau**	1930 – May 6, 1962	University of New Hampshire	Durham, New Hampshire	Merged (ΔΖ)	(Note: Chapter formed from Sigma Omicron (local), established in 1926. At the time of the national merger, the chapter became the Theta Gamma chapter of Delta Zeta)
**Upsilon**	1931 – May 6, 1962	Westminster College	New Wilmington, Pennsylvania	Merged (ΔΖ)	(Note: Chapter formed from Pi Rho Phi (local), established in 1905. At the time of the national merger, the chapter became the Theta Delta chapter of Delta Zeta)
Phi	1931–1941	Nebraska Wesleyan University	Lincoln, Nebraska	Inactive	(Note: Chapter formed from Delta Phi (local), established in 1916.)
Chi	1931–1936	West Virginia University	Morgantown, West Virginia	Inactive	(Note: Chapter formed from Pi Tau Delta (local), established in 1926.)
**Psi**	1932 – May 6, 1962	Louisiana Tech University	Ruston, Louisiana	Merged (ΔΖ)	(Note: Chapter formed from Delta Phi Gamma (local), established in 1926. At the time of the national merger, the chapter became the Theta Epsilon chapter of Delta Zeta.)
Alpha Alpha	1932–1952	University of Alabama	Tuscaloosa, Alabama	Inactive	(Note: Chapter formed from Alpha Omega (local), established in 1930.)
Beta Alpha	1932–1960	New York University	New York City, New York	Inactive	(Note: Chapter formed from Psi Xi Omega (local), established in 1919.)
Gamma Alpha	1933–1948	Millikin University	Decatur, Illinois	Inactive	(Note: Chapter formed from Theta Gamma (local), established in 1921.)
**Delta Alpha**	1933 – May 6, 1962	Temple University	Philadelphia, Pennsylvania	Merged (ΔΖ)	(Note: Chapter formed from Alpha Theta Pi (local), established in 1915. At the time of the national merger, the chapter joined the Delta Tau chapter of Delta Zeta)
Epsilon Alpha	1933–1940	Northwestern University	Evanston, Illinois	Inactive	(Note: Formerly a Lambda Omega chapter.)
Zeta Alpha	1933–1941	University of Denver	Denver, Colorado	Inactive	
Eta Alpha	1933–1937	University of Utah	Salt Lake City, Utah	Inactive	
Theta Alpha	1933–1935	Colby College	Waterville, Maine	Inactive	(Note: This chapter had four Greek letter names in the span of seven years: Beta Chi Theta (local), the Gamma chapter of Alpha Sigma Delta in 1928, the Iota chapter of Lambda Omega in 1932, and the Theta Alpha chapter of Theta Upsilon in 1933. It went inactive in 1935.)
Iota Alpha	1935–1956	Auburn University	Auburn, Alabama	Inactive	
**Kappa Alpha**	1939 – May 6, 1962	University of Akron	Akron, Ohio	Merged (ΔΖ)	(Note: Chapter formed from Phi Kappa Delta (local), established in 1922. At the time of the national merger, the chapter became the Theta Zeta chapter of Delta Zeta.)
Lambda Alpha	1947–1960	University of Colorado	Boulder, Colorado	Inactive	
**Mu Alpha**	1954 – May 6, 1962	Creighton University	Omaha, Nebraska	Merged (ΔΖ)	(Note: Chapter formed from Kappa Beta Gamma, established in 1948. At the time of the national merger, the chapter became the Theta Eta chapter of Delta Zeta.)
Nu Alpha	1955–1961	Western Michigan University	Kalamazoo, Michigan	Inactive	(Note: Chapter formed from Alpha Pi Beta (local), established in 1952.)
**Xi Alpha**	1958 – May 6, 1962	DePaul University	Chicago, Illinois	Merged (ΔΖ)	(Note: Chapter formed from Delta Chi Alpha (local), established in 1958. At the time of the national merger, the chapter became the Theta Theta chapter of Delta Zeta.)
**Omicron Alpha**	1960 – May 6, 1962	Western Carolina College	Cullowhee, North Carolina	Merged (ΔΖ)	(Note: Chapter formed from Delta Gamma Phi (local), established in 1957. At the time of the national merger, the chapter became the Theta Iota chapter of Delta Zeta.)

== See also ==
- List of social sororities and women's fraternities
- Delta Zeta
- Lambda Omega
