= Phi Omega Pi =

American collegiate sorority (1922–1946)

- ΦΩΠ
- Founded: March 15, 1910; 116 years ago University of Nebraska
- Type: Social
- Former affiliation: NPC
- Status: Merged
- Merge date: August 10, 1946
- Successor: Delta Zeta
- Scope: National
- Colors: Sapphire blue and White
- Flower: Lily-of-the-valley
- Publication: Kochev; The Pentagon of Phi Omega Pi
- Chapters: 29
- Former name: Achoth
- Headquarters: United States

Phi Omega Pi (ΦΩΠ) was a national collegiate sorority operating in the United States from 1922 until 1946, when its chapters were absorbed by several larger sororities, and merged with the national sorority, Delta Zeta.

== History ==
The sorority originally formed as Achoth (Hebrew: אָחוֹת signifying one's blood sister or a female relative), created on the campus of the University of Nebraska on March 15, 1910. The fifteen founding sisters were all members in good standing of the Order of the Eastern Star. In a letter to the fraternity, Jessie Downing explained to Sigma Phi Epsilon that Achoth "is similar to that of the Acacia fraternity, but in no way are the two connected". In 1911, it was officially recognized by the Order of the Eastern Star organization, and only Eastern Star members were permitted to join. Chapters were named in Hebrew alphabetic order. The first chapter was Aleph (Nebraska), the second Beth (Iowa), etc.

The sorority published a magazine called Kochev. Sources from various fraternal organizations demonstrate that Achoth was functioning as a typical collegiate sorority. The Trident of Delta Delta Delta (1920) recorded Achoth's petition for admission to the National Panhellenic Congress, but this was denied.

Achoth may have changed its official name as early as 1922. Kappa Sigma's Caduceus (1922) reported that the "Supreme Governing Council of Achoth announces the change of the name 'Achoth' to 'Phi Omega Pi' fraternity." Other contemporary publications refer to Achoth as Achoth, e.g., "A chapter of Achoth, the organization of Eastern Star members, was installed last March" (IU Alumni Quarterly, 1922). The chapters were renamed according to the Greek alphabet, and the sorority's periodical was renamed from Kochev to The Pentagon.

In 1933, Phi Omega Pi dropped the Masonic requirement and was thus given full membership into the National Panhellenic Conference. That same year, the sorority absorbed two other organizations. Sigma Phi Beta was a national group with ten chapters. Founded on November 1, 1920, at New York University as Sigma Sigma Omicron, in July 1927, its name was changed to Sigma Phi Beta. Additionally, Phi Alpha Chi, formed at the University of California, Berkeley as Tanewah in 1919. In 1926, that group renamed itself as the Alpha chapter of Phi Alpha Chi. Phi Alpha Chi merged into Sigma Phi Beta prior to its merger into Phi Omega Pi on August 10, 1946.

One source describes a relatively uncomplicated merger: "after 1933, Achoth, Tanewah, Phi Alpha Chi, and Sigma Phi Beta members were all sisters in Phi Omega Pi". In 1937, Pentagon was listed as having sixteen collegiate and 39 alumnae chapters and clubs. However, Baird's Manual (20th ed.) notes:

The chapters at Iowa State Teachers College, Newark State Normal, and Montclair Teachers College were placed on the inactive list by order of the Panhellenic Congress when [in 1933] Phi Omega Pi joined it. In the period following, chapters were taken over by Alpha Omicron Pi, Alpha Gamma Delta, Sigma Kappa, and Kappa Alpha Theta. The group disbanded in 1946. Through an NPC committee, Delta Zeta was asked to consider the alumnae and a few chapters that remained. In 1946, the members of ΦΩΠ were accepted into Delta Zeta sorority.

== Symbols ==
As described by Miner, the crest of Phi Omega Pi "had a sapphire blue ground crossed by an inverted chevron of white upon which were placed five five-pointed stars. Below the chevron and to the left was placed the sword and veil, and to the right the lily of the valley with five bells. Above the chevron was the Roman numeral X. Surmounting the shield was a crown, below which was a rod. Beneath the shield is a white ribbon upon which are the Greek letters ΦΩΠ."

The original Achoth sorority pin, used prior to the name change to Phi Omega Pi.

Its colors were sapphire blue and white. Its flower was the lily-of-the-valley.

While the sorority was known as Achoth, its badge and its symbolism were described as follows: "...the pin bore the Hebrew characters Shin, Nun, Aleph, the initial letters of the organization's motto, but in 1920 the letters were changed to Greek, and in October of 1922, the name was changed to correspond with the letters on the pin. The chapters formerly were named in the order of the Hebrew alphabet, but with the change of name, they automatically took [names based on] the Greek alphabet." This change occurred at the 1921 convention in Minneapolis. Thus, the badge of Phi Omega Pi became "an irregular pentagon. The center was raised and in black enamel. The upper section was surmounted by a raised five-pointed star set with a blue sapphire [above the Greek letters ΦΩΠ engraved in gold.] Around the edge of [the pentagon or] blade were set 20 whole pearls."

The pledge pin was "a black enameled pentagon bearing the Greek letters "ΦΩΠ" in gold. The pentagon was banded in gold also." f

== Chapters ==
Before 1923, the sorority used Hebrew language chapter designations, so the Nebraska chapter would have been Aleph, the Iowa chapter Beth, etc. The chapter designations were recast into Greek form in 1922-23. Following is a list of chapters of Phi Omega Pi.

Chapter	Former name	Charter date and range	Institution	Location	Status	Ref.
Alpha	Aleph	March 5, 1910 – 1935	University of Nebraska	Lincoln, Nebraska	Inactive	
Beta	Beth	June 24, 1910 – 1934	University of Iowa	Iowa City, Iowa	Inactive	
Gamma	Gimel	April 28, 1911 – 1946	University of Illinois	Urbana, Illinois	Withdrew (ΣΚ)	(Note: Absorbed a chapter of Sigma Phi Beta with the national merger of the two sororities.) (Note: Chapter withdrew and revived a chapter of Sigma Kappa.)
Delta	Daleth	March 13, 1912 – 1925	University of Kansas	Lawrence, Kansas	Inactive	
Epsilon (First)	Hay	May 11, 1914 – 1917	University of Washington	Seattle, Washington	Withdrew (ΦΜ); Reassigned	(Note: Chapter withdrew to become the Eta Beta chapter of Phi Mu.)
Zeta	Waw	April 2, 1915 – 1943	North Dakota Agricultural College	Fargo, North Dakota	Inactive	(Note: The 1915 Baird's shows Waw as U of Washington, later revised.)
Eta	Zayin	April 9, 1915 – 1933	Iowa State Teachers College	Cedar Falls, Iowa	Withdrew (local)	(Note: Chapter withdrew and became a local organization.)
Theta	Kheth	April 10, 1915 – 1946	University of Wisconsin	Madison, Wisconsin	Withdrew (ΔΖ)	(Note: Chapter formed from the local group Eastern Star, established in 1915. Later, it withdrew and revived a chapter of Delta Zeta.)
Iota	Teth	1917–1919	University of Colorado	Boulder, Colorado	Inactive	
Kappa	Yodh	1917 – 1942	University of Minnesota	Minneapolis, Minnesota	Inactive	(Note: Chapter formed from Areme, established in 1915.)
Lambda	Kaph	1919–1946	University of California, Berkeley	Berkeley, California	Merged (ΔΖ)	(Note: Chapter formed from a local chapter of the Eastern Star, established in 1918.) (Note: Chapter withdrew to merge with an existing Delta Zeta chapter.)
Mu		1920–1933, 1940–1945	Ohio State University	Columbus, Ohio	Inactive	(Note: Chapter formed from Achoth, established in 1920.)
Nu		1921–1929	University of Oklahoma	Norman, Oklahoma	Inactive	
Epsilon (Second)		1922–1943	Northwestern University	Evanston, Illinois	Withdrew (ΣΣΔ)	(Note: Chapter originated as a local called Aeukiga. It withdrew to become a chapter of Sigma Sigma Delta.)
Xi		1922–1946	Indiana University	Bloomington, Indiana	Merged (ΑΞΔ)	(Note: Chapter withdrew and became a chapter of Alpha Xi Delta.)
Omicron		1923–1941	Kansas State College	Manhattan, Kansas	Inactive	(Note: Chapter formed from the local group Eastern Star, established in 1921.)
Pi		1924–1934	Iowa State College	Ames, Iowa	Inactive	(Note: Chapter formed from Omega Pi, established in 1922.)
Rho		1924–1933	DePauw University	Greencastle, Indiana	Inactive	(Note: Chapter formed from Lambda Omicron Alpha, established in 1922.)
Sigma		1925–1946	University of California, Los Angeles	Los Angeles, California	Merged (ΔΖ)	(Note: Chapter formed from Lambda Tau, established in 1925.)
Tau		1926–1937	University of Washington	Seattle, Washington	Inactive	(Note: Chapter formed from Epsilon Sigma, established in 1924.)
Upsilon		1928–1932	Oklahoma A&M University	Stillwater, Oklahoma	Inactive	(Note: Chapter formed from Omega Pi, established in 1925.)
Phi		1929–1933	University of Arizona	Tucson, Arizona	Inactive	(Note: Chapter formed from the Masonic Club, established in 1923.)
Alpha Beta		1933–1935	Utah Agricultural College	Logan, Utah	Inactive	(Note: Chapter formed from a chapter of Sigma Phi Beta, established in 1930.)
New York Alpha		1933–1943	New York University	New York City, New York	Inactive	(Note: Chapter formed from a chapter of Sigma Phi Beta, established in 1920.)
New York Gamma		1933–1946	Hunter College	New York City, New York	Merged (ΔΖ)	(Note: Chapter formed from a chapter of Sigma Phi Beta, established in 1921.) (Note: Chapter withdrew to form a chapter of Delta Zeta.)
Omega		1933–1937	Wittenberg College	Springfield, Ohio	Inactive	
Alpha Alpha		1933–1939	Transylvania University	Lexington, Kentucky	Inactive	(Note: Chapter formed from a chapter of Sigma Phi Beta, established in 1929.)
Psi		1933–1946	Alabama Polytechnic Institute	Auburn, Alabama	Withdrew (ΑΟΠ)	(Note: Chapter formed from a chapter of Sigma Phi Beta, established in 1923.) (Note: Chapter withdrew to form a chapter of Alpha Omicron Pi.)
Alpha Zeta		1938–1941	Georgetown College	Georgetown, Kentucky	Inactive	(Note: Chapter formed from Phi Zeta, established in 1934.)

== See also ==
- List of social sororities and women's fraternities
- Omega Epsilon Sigma
- Order of the Eastern Star
