= Phi Alpha Chi =

American college sorority (1925–1928)

- ΦΑΧ
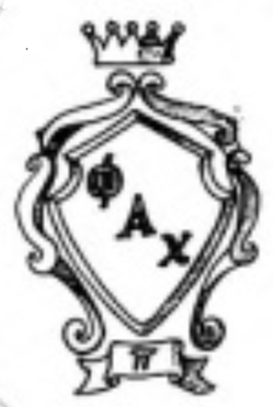
- Coat of Arms Phi Alpha Chi
- Founded: December 4, 1925; 100 years ago University of California, Berkeley
- Type: Social
- Affiliation: Independent
- Status: Merged
- Merge date: January 7, 1928
- Successor: Sigma Phi Beta
- Scope: National
- Colors: Red and White
- Flower: American Beauty rose
- Chapters: 3
- Former name: Tewanah
- Headquarters: United States

Phi Alpha Chi (ΦΑΧ) was an American college sorority. It was established in 1925 at the University of California, Berkeley. It expanded to become a national sorority with three chapters before merging into Sigma Phi Beta in 1928.

== History ==
In November 1919, the California chapter of the social sorority Tewanah was established at the University of California, Berkeley. Tewanah had a chapter house at 2610 Etna Street in Berkeley.

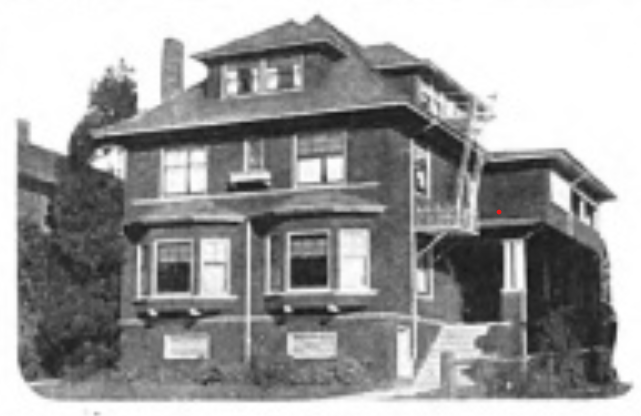
Phi Alpha Chi chapter house, Berkeley, California, 1926

Tewanah reorganized as Phi Alpha Chi on December 4, 1925, with plans of becoming a national sorority. The chapter at the University of California was assigned the name Alpha. By January 1926, it had a chapter house on 2333 College Avenue in Berkeley.

Phi Alpha Chi became a national sorority in May 1926 with the establishment of the Beta chapter at Ohio State University. That was followed by Gamma chapter at Alabama Polytechnic Institute, now Auburn University, in May 1927. It was the first sorority at the institute to receive permission to have a chapter house.

Phi Alpha Chi merged with Sigma Phi Beta sorority on January 7, 1928. Sigma Phi Beta was later absorbed by Phi Omega Pi.

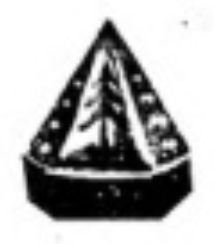
Badge of Tewanah

== Symbols ==
The colors of Phi Alpha Chi were red and white. Its flower was the American Beauty rose. Its members were called "sorores".

== Chapters ==
Following are the chapters of Phi Alpha Chi, with inactive chapters indicated in italics.

Chapter	Charter date and range	Institution	Location	Status	Ref.
Alpha	December 4, 1925 – January 7, 1928	University of California	Berkeley, California	Merged (ΣΦΒ)	(Note: Chapter was formed from the California chapter of Tewanah, established in November 1919.) (Note: Chapter became the California Alpha chapter of Sigma Phi Beta with the national merger of the two sororities.)
Beta	May 28, 1926 – January 7, 1928	Ohio State University	Columbus, Ohio	Merged (ΣΦΒ)	(Note: Became the Delta chapter of Sigma Phi Beta with the national merger of the two sororities.)
Gamma	May 5, 1927 – January 7, 1928	Alabama Polytechnic Institute	Auburn, Alabama	Merged (ΣΦΒ)	(Note: Chapter formed from Phi Delta Rho (local), established in September 1923.) (Note: Became a chapter of Sigma Phi Beta with the national merger of the two sororities.)

== See also ==
- College fraternities and sororities
- List of social sororities and women's fraternities
