= Kappa Beta Gamma =

North American collegiate sorority

- ΚΒΓ
- Founded: January 22, 1917; 109 years ago Marquette University
- Type: Social
- Affiliation: Independent
- Status: Active
- Scope: North America
- Motto: "Character, Culture, Courage"
- Colors: Deep Sapphire, Pearl White and Old Gold
- Symbol: Five-pointed star
- Flower: Forget-me-not
- Jewel: Blue sapphire and white pearl
- Mascot: Jermain the Lion
- Publication: Kappa Star
- Philanthropy: Special Olympics
- Chapters: 32 active, 24 inactive
- Colonies: 2
- Headquarters: 540 Pearl Cove Court; Atlanta, Georgia 30350; United States
- Website: www.kappabetagamma.org and www.kbgcanada.ca

Kappa Beta Gamma (ΚΒΓ) is a North American college sorority. It was founded in 1917 at Marquette University in Milwaukee, Wisconsin. The sorority has chartered more than fifty chapters in the United States and Canada. Originally, chapters were established at Catholic institutions, with the sorority later expanding to other institutions.

== History ==
On January 22, 1917, twelve women of Marquette University founded the campus's first sorority, Kappa Beta Gamma. The founders were Patricia Hagerty, Teresa Jermain, Eva Johnson, Mary Kitzke, Felicia Knafzynska, Lorraine Kress, Jeannie Lee, Vivienne Leichtman, Myrtle Maas, Myra Thewalt, Mary Weimar, and Mary White. Jermain was the first president.

The immediate aim of the sorority expressed at its founding was: "to Unite the Members in the bond of Sisterhood; to Develop Friendships among the Members During their College Days; to Improve the Members Morally, Socially and Intellectually; and to Foster the Support of College/University, Alma Mater and of God and Country." This was later revised as:

The Sisters of Kappa Beta Gamma International Sorority is an organization dedicated to improving its members morally, socially, and intellectually. As friends, we are committed to bettering our schools and communities by offering leadership opportunities during and beyond our college days.

In 1947, the sorority established its second chapter, Alpha, at Saint Louis University; St. Louis, Missouri. The chapter at Marquette University then became known as the Beta chapter. Originally, chapters were established at Catholic institutions, with the sorority later expanding to other institutions.

In 2011, Kappa Beta Gamma installed its first chapter in Canada, the Upsilon chapter at the University of Victoria in Victoria, British Columbia. However, on July 1, 2021, the sorority split into two entities, with a different leadership team for the United States and Canada.

This sorority is not a member of the National Panhellenic Conference, though chapters will regularly participate with campus panhellenic associations.

== Symbols ==
The sorority's motto is "Character, Culture, Courage". Its five ideals or pillars are Love & Faith, Sisterhood, Loyalty, Charity, and Fidelity. Founder Weimar designed the sorority badge, a wreath of six pearls and six sapphires encircling the Greek letters "ΚΒΓ". She also designed the membership pin, a blue shield with a gold stripe running diagonally across it.

Its colors are deep sapphire, pearl white, and old gold. The five pointed star is the symbol, representing its five ideals. It flower is the forget-me-not. The sorority has two jewels, the blue sapphire and white pearl. The sorority has designated a mascot, Jermain the Lion (Jermain being the last name of the first grand mistress, or president).

The initiation ceremony is called Krossover. Kappa Beta Gamma's quarterly publication is the Kappa Star.

== Activities ==
Kappa Beta Gamma marks three annual days of remembrance, listed in the order they were established:

- January 22 – Founders Day
- May 14 – National Founders Day
- April 2 – International Founders Day

The annual convention of the sorority is called its Konvention, held on a rotating basis at locations in the US and Canada during the first weekend of August. An additional celebration, an International Formal Star Ball, is held every fifth year to mark significant milestones.

== Philanthropy ==
Kappa Beta Gamma's philanthropy is the Special Olympics. Along with the national philanthropy, each chapter chooses a local philanthropy to support.

== Governance ==
The sorority is governed through its international conventions. Presiding over these annual events and responsible for the organization's affairs in the interim between conventions, two separate, but cooperative boards of directors, one for the United States and one for Canada, are elected to their positions indefinitely by the membership of Kappa Beta Gamma. There are no term limits or minimum term of service for these board positions. The Board of Directors is primarily responsible for hiring and management of the international president, supporting the international board, and handling legal and business matters on behalf of the membership.

Day-to-day management of the sorority is vested in four staff positions: the international president, a vice-president of compliance-Canada, a vice-president of compliance-USA, and a vice-president of membership development. The sorority's international headquarters are located in Georgia.

== Chapters ==
Kappa Beta Gamma has chartered more than fifty college chapters in the United States and Canada. The sorority also has an Alumnae Society, available to any alumna member. They offer an alumnae initiate program.

== See also ==
- List of social sororities and women's fraternities
