= Delta Zeta =

International collegiate sorority

- ΔΖ
- Founded: October 24, 1902; 124 years ago Miami University
- Type: Social
- Affiliation: NPC
- Status: Active
- Scope: International
- Motto: "Truly"
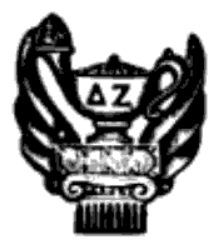
- Member badge
- Colors: Rose, Green
- Symbol: Roman lamp
- Flower: Pink Killarney rose
- Jewel: Diamond
- Mascot: Turtle
- Publication: The LAMP of Delta Zeta
- Philanthropy: Speech and Hearing, Serious Fun Children's Network, The Starkey Hearing Foundation, and American Society for Deaf Children
- Chapters: 163
- Members: 300,000+ lifetime
- Headquarters: 202 East Church Street; Oxford, Ohio 45056; United States
- Website: www.deltazeta.org

Delta Zeta (ΔΖ, also known as DZ) is an international college sorority founded on October 24, 1902, at Miami University in Oxford, Ohio. Delta Zeta has 163 collegiate chapters in the United States and Canada, and over 180 alumnae chapters in Canada, the United Kingdom, and the United States. As of 2013, there are over 300,400 college and alumnae members, making it the third largest sorority in the nation (after Alpha Delta Pi and Chi Omega).

In 1954, the sorority adopted speech and hearing as its philanthropic cause, and is partnered with the Starkey Hearing Foundation and Gallaudet University. Throughout its history, it has absorbed several other smaller sororities and also opened its first Canadian chapter in 1992. Delta Zeta is one of 26 national sororities that are members under the umbrella organization of the National Panhellenic Conference; the sorority joined the Conference in 1910.

== History ==
Delta Zeta Sorority was founded at Miami University in Oxford, Ohio in 1902, the same year that the university first allowed female students. Miami is dubbed the "Mother of Fraternities" because of the many prominent men's fraternities which were founded there.

Six of the newly admitted women consulted the university president Guy Potter Benton, regarding the founding of the first sorority chapter. Having been a leader in the Phi Delta Theta fraternity, he was familiar with the processes of a Greek organization and helped the women establish Delta Zeta, the first sorority at the campus. Benton aided in the preparation of the sorority's ritual, badge, and colors. For his contributions, he was named its Grand Patron.

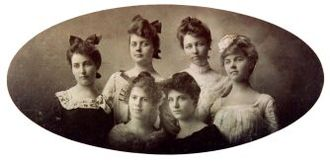
Delta Zeta's founders

The Delta Zeta Sorority was officially incorporated on October 24, 1902. Its founding members were Julia Lawrence Bishop, Mary Jane Collins, Alfa Lloyd Hayes, Anna Louise Keen, Mabelle May Minton, and Anne Dial Simmons.

The first National Assembly, with Lloyd as the national president, was held in 1907. In 1910, Delta Zeta published the first issue of its national magazine, The LAMP, now issued three times a year. That same year, the sorority joined the National Panhellenic Conference.

Throughout the middle of the century, Delta Zeta absorbed four other sororities: Beta Phi Alpha in 1941, Phi Omega Pi in 1946, Delta Sigma Epsilon in 1956, and Theta Upsilon in 1962; most of these sororities had previously absorbed other, smaller sororities as well. In 1992, Delta Zeta chartered its first Canadian chapter at the University of Windsor, marking the beginning of the sorority's international expansion.

== Symbols ==
Delta Zeta's gold badge consists of a Roman lamp on top of a Ionic column, with the three wings of Mercury on each side. The Greek letters "ΔΖ" are inscribed on the lamp in black enamel. There is a diamond set at the spout of the lamp and four pearls inset on the capital of the column. The original badge did not include pearls, which were added a few years later.

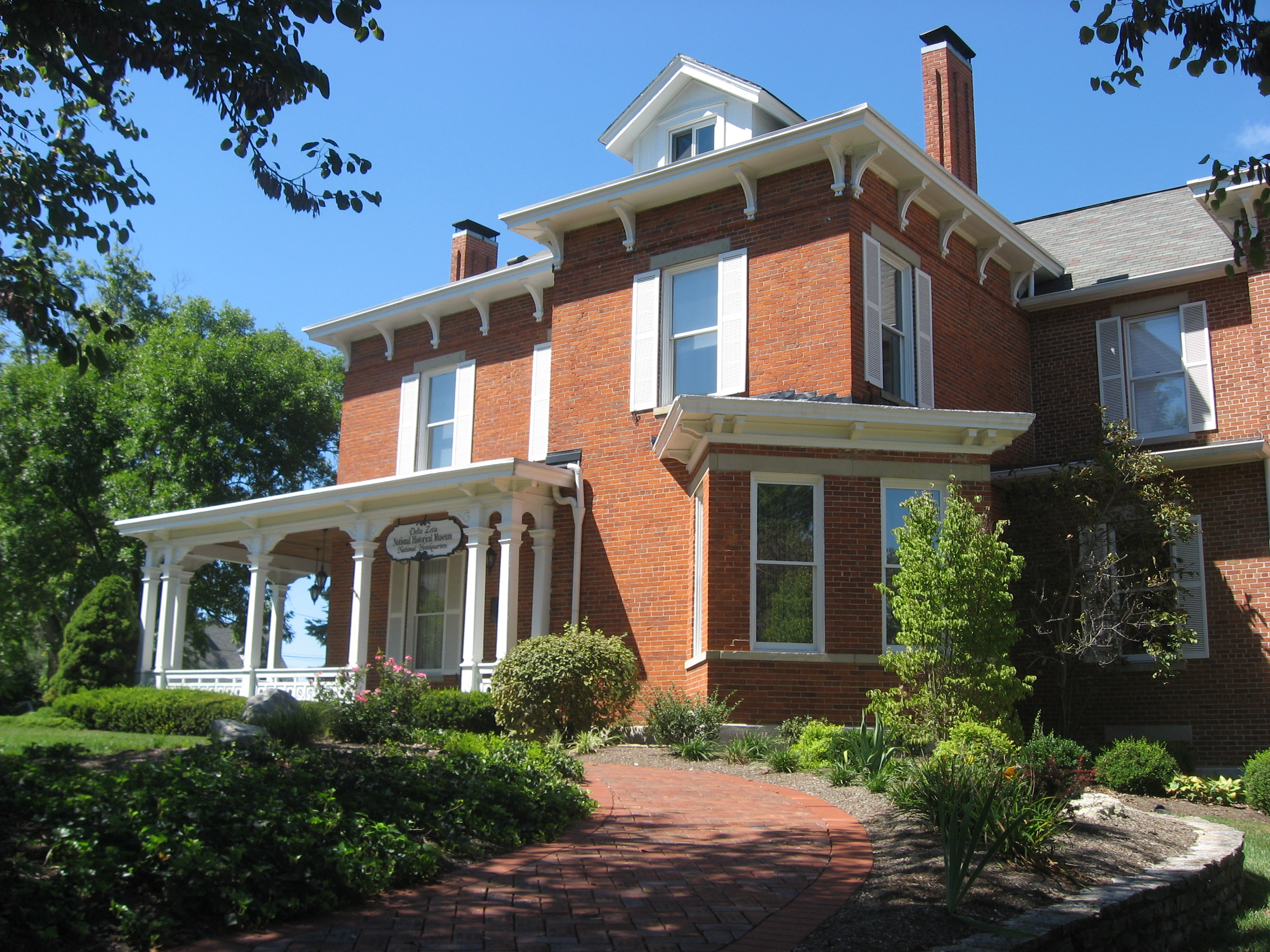
Delta Zeta headquarters in Oxford, Ohio

The new member pin is a black enamel diamond decorated with a Roman lamp in gold. The Roman lamp is the sorority's symbol. Delta Zeta's flower is the pink Killarney rose. Its stone is the diamond. The turtle is its mascot. The sorority's official colors are rose and green. (The 1905 Baird's Manual lists the colors as old rose and Nile green.) Delta Zeta is one of the first sororities to have had a Lilly Pulitzer print made with its symbols.

Its publication is The LAMP of Delta Zeta.

== Governance ==
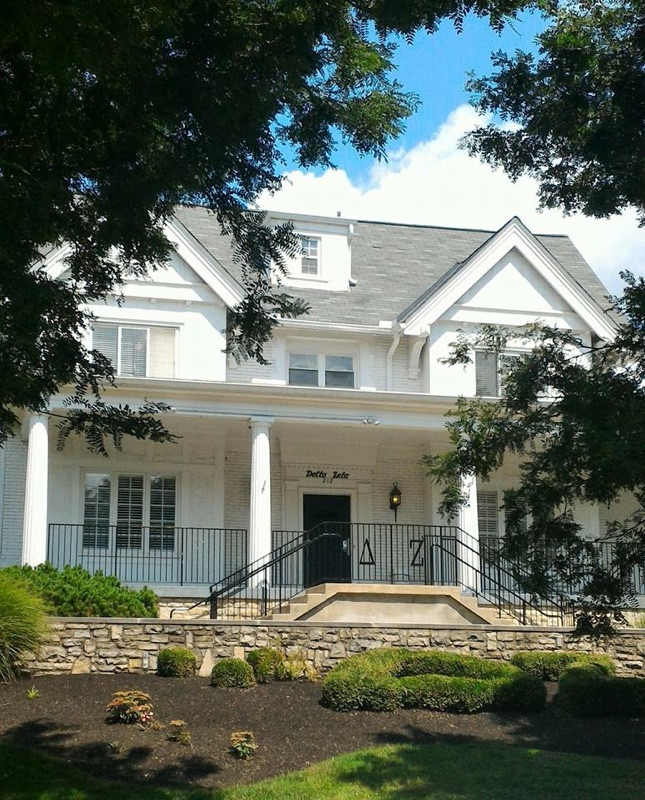
The Delta Zeta chapter house at Ohio State University in Columbus, Ohio

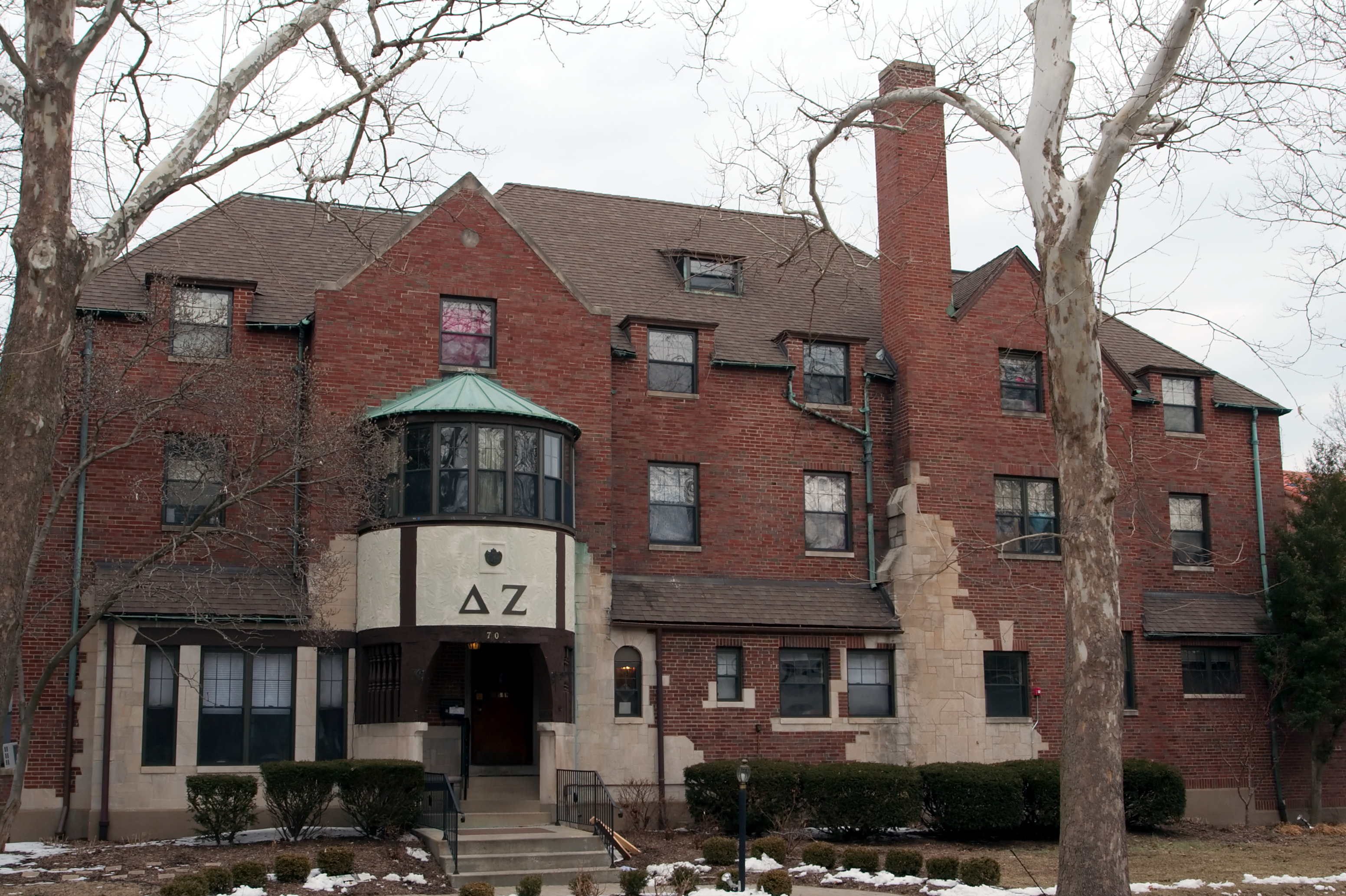
The University of Illinois Urbana-Champaign chapter house

The National Council of Delta Zeta is an alumnae board tasked with the governance of the organization.

The Delta Zeta Foundation is a not-for-profit entity within the organization that provides various scholarships for members of the sorority as well as funding leadership, philanthropy, and education programs. There is a national philanthropic organization for active members of Delta Zeta known as the 1902 Loyalty Society, and members join by donating $19.02.

== Chapters ==
Delta Zeta has 165 collegiate chapters in the United States and Canada and over 200 alumnae chapters in Canada, the United Kingdom, and the United States.

== Notable members ==
- Mercedes Allison Bates (Chi), first female corporate officer, General Mills Foods
- Shelley Berkley (Iota Phi), current Mayor of Las Vegas and former U.S. Representative for Nevada's 1st congressional district
- Arlene Davis (Iota), American aviator and air racer
- Nanette Fabray (Xi Omicron), actress, worked to bring sign language and captioning to television
- Tina Fey (Lambda Delta), actress, Primetime Emmy Award winner, Golden Globe Award winner
- Lisa Franchetti (Alpha Alpha) former United States Navy admiral who served as the 33rd chief of naval operations from 2 November 2023 to 21 February 2025. First woman to be chief of naval operations, and the first woman to serve on the Joint Chiefs of Staff.
- Mary Hill Fulstone (Mu) longest-practicing physician in the state of Nevada
- Edith Head (Alumna Initiate, Mu), Emmy Award-winning designer; seven-time Oscar winner in costume design
- Florence Henderson (Alpha Chi, honorary alumnae initiate), actress
- Carolyn Huntoon, (Epsilon Beta), space pioneer and first female director of Johnson Space Center
- Helen Johnston, physician
- Princess Märtha of Sweden (Alumna Initiate, Upsilon), princess of Sweden and crown princess of Norway.
- Miriam E. Mason (Epsilon), Notable children's author
- Hala Moddelmog (Iota Nu), first female president and CEO of the Metro Atlanta Chamber (MAC)
- Maurine Brown Neuberger (Omega), former U.S. Senator
- Melissa Ordway (Delta Delta), actress and model
- Gail Patrick (Alpha Pi), actress, executive producer of the Perry Mason
- Ivy Baker Priest (Alpha Chi), former United States Treasurer
- Pat Priest (Alpha Chi), actress, The Munsters
- Zelta Feike Rodenwold (Chi), home economist, broadcaster
- Galadriel Stineman (Kappa Beta), actress
- Marcia Wallace (Delta Nu), television and stage actress
- Mary Jo West (Alpha Sigma), First primetime anchorwoman in Phoenix, member of the Arizona Women's Hall of Fame
- Lynn Forney Young (Zeta Psi), 43rd president general, Daughters of the American Revolution
- Kay Yow (Zeta Lambda), women's basketball coach, North Carolina State University

== Controversies ==
At the end of 2006, the Delta Zeta national leadership was criticized after The New York Times published an article accusing the national office of moving certain members of the Delta chapter at DePauw University to alumnae status based on their perceived attractiveness. Founded in 1909, the Delta chapter was the sorority's second-oldest active chapter and its fourth-oldest chapter overall (a "single letter" chapter). Despite its long history at DePauw, the chapter struggled with declining membership and had acquired a negative reputation on campus. As a result, Delta chapter members voted to request Delta Zeta Sorority to close the chapter due to falling numbers and a lack of interest in recruitment. When notified of the chapter decision, Delta Zeta Sorority arranged a chapter membership review and chapter reorganization rather than closing the chapter completely. Several of the members who were moved to alumnae status, and therefore required to move out of the Delta Zeta house at DePauw, argued that they were moved to alumnae status due to their perceived unattractiveness, weight, or ethnicity and contacted the media.

== See also ==
- List of social sororities and women's fraternities
