= List of villages in Østfold =

This is a list of villages in Østfold, a county of Norway. For other counties see the lists of villages in Norway.

The list excludes cities located in Østfold.

Place	Coordinates	Postal code	Municipality
Alshus			Fredrikstad
Asak	59°9′0″N 11°27′0″E	1791	Halden
Aspedammen	59°4′0″N 11°30′0″E		Halden
Berg	59°4′0″N 11°30′0″E	1788	Halden
Bjørkebekk		1798	Aremark
Borgenhaugen/Borgen	59°16′0″N 11°10′0″E	1738/1739	Sarpsborg
Degernes	59°18′0″N 11°40′0″E	1892	Rakkestad
Dilling	59°24′0″N 10°42′0″E	1570	Rygge
Ekholt			Rygge
Elvestad			Hobøl
Engalsvik	59°15′3″N 10°44′13″E	1628	Fredrikstad
Fosby	59°13′0″N 11°42′0″E	1798	Aremark
Fuglevik	59°23′6″N 10°39′18″E		Rygge
Glosli			Fredrikstad
Gressvik	59°13′0″N 10°54′0″E	1621	Fredrikstad
Greåker	59°16′0″N 11°2′0″E	1718/1719	Sarpsborg
Grimstad		1640	Råde
Hafslund		1734	Sarpsborg
Hamnås	59°37′0″N 11°25′0″E		Trøgstad
Hasle		1734	Sarpsborg
Hauge	59°6′0″N 10°53′0″E	1684	Hvaler
Heiås (Båstad)	59°42′0″N 11°18′0″E	1866	Trøgstad
Herføl	59°0′0″N 11°3′0″E	1690	Hvaler
Holm/Torsnes			Fredrikstad
Holtet		1796	Halden
Hovin	59°38′0″N 11°7′0″E	1820	Spydeberg
Hærland		1878	Eidsberg
Høysand		1747	Sarpsborg
Ise	59°18′0″N 11°14′0″E	1730	Sarpsborg
Isebakke			Halden
Jelsnes		1708	Sarpsborg
Kambo	59°28′25″N 10°42′0″E	1538	Moss
Karlshus	59°21′0″N 10°52′0″E	1640	Råde
Kirkebygden (Våler)		1592	Våler
Klavestadhaugen/ Sandbakken		1743	Sarpsborg
Knapstad	59°38′0″N 11°3′0″E	1823	Hobøl
Kornsjø	58°58′0″N 11°39′0″E	1796	Halden
Korshavn		1692	Hvaler
Kykkelsrud	59°35′0″N 11°6′0″E		Askim
Larkollen	59°20′2″N 10°39′56″E	1560	Rygge
Lervik	59°16′0″N 10°45′0″E		Fredrikstad
Manstad	59°13′0″N 10°48′0″E	1626	Fredrikstad
Missingmyr		1640	Råde
Mørkfoss	59°39′0″N 11°14′0″E	1860	Trøgstad
Nedgården		1692	Hvaler
Otteid		1875	Marker
Papper		1684	Hvaler
Prestebakke		1796	Halden
Rakkestad	59°26′0″N 11°21′0″E	1890	Rakkestad
Ringvoll		1827	Hobøl
Rokke	59°11′0″N 11°21′0″E		Halden
Rostadneset			Fredrikstad
Rygge (Ryggebyen)	59°22′30″N 10°45′0″E	1580	Rygge
Rød	59°4′0″N 10°57′0″E	1684	Hvaler
Rødenes			Marker
Rømskog		1950	Rømskog
Saltnes	59°17′15″N 10°44′53″E	1642	Råde
Sandum	59°43′0″N 11°47′0″E	1950	Rømskog
Sellebakk	59°14′0″N 11°0′0″E	1650	Fredrikstad
Skantebygda	59°24′0″N 11°14′0″E		Rakkestad
Skiptvet		1806	Skiptvet
Skjeberg	59°14′0″N 11°12′0″E	1746/1747	Sarpsborg
Skjelfoss	59°34′0″N 10°50′0″E	1827	Hobøl
Skjærhalden	59°2′0″N 11°2′0″E	1680	Hvaler
Skjærvika (Skivika)			Fredrikstad
Skjønhaug	59°39′0″N 11°18′0″E	1860	Trøgstad
Skogskroken		1796	Halden
Slevik	59°12′0″N 10°50′0″E		Fredrikstad
Slitu		1859	Eidsberg
Smedhus			Rygge
Solbergfoss	59°38′0″N 11°12′0″E		Askim
Sperrebotn	59°27′0″N 10°48′0″E	1591	Våler
Spetalen	59°17′15″N 10°44′53″E	1642	Råde
Sponvika	59°6′0″N 11°14′0″E	1794	Halden
Spydeberg	59°36′0″N 11°5′0″E	1820	Spydeberg
Stikkaåsen		1712	Sarpsborg
Strømsfoss	59°18′0″N 11°40′0″E	1798	Aremark
Svanekil		1692	Hvaler
Svinesund	59°6′0″N 11°16′0″E	1789	Halden
Svinndal		1593	Våler
Tistedalen	59°8′0″N 11°27′0″E	1791	Halden
Tomter	59°39′0″N 11°0′0″E	1825	Hobøl
Torp	59°15′0″N 11°2′0″E	1657	Fredrikstad
Tosebygda	59°39′0″N 11°14′0″E	1860	Trøgstad
Trømborg (Eidsberg)	59°30′0″N 11°23′0″E	1880	Eidsberg
Ullerøy		1747	Sarpsborg
Utgård	59°5′0″N 10°52′0″E	1684	Hvaler
Varteig		1735	Sarpsborg
Vatvet	59°18′0″N 11°25′0″E	1892	Rakkestad
Venta		1866	Trøgstad
Vikene	59°13′0″N 10°48′0″E		Fredrikstad
Viker			Fredrikstad
Våk		1591	Våler
Ytterskogen			Rakkestad
Yven		1715	Sarpsborg
Ørje	59°29′0″N 11°39′0″E	1870	Marker
Ørmen	59°18′0″N 10°54′0″E		Fredrikstad
Øyenkilen	59°10′0″N 10°51′0″E		Fredrikstad
Øyestad	59.18793°N 11.213°E	1746	Sarpsborg
Øymark			Marker
Årum	59°16′0″N 11°7′0″E		Fredrikstad
