= Norwegian National Road 22 =

Road in Norway

Coordinates: 59°50′52″N 11°14′29″E

National Road 22
- Bokmål: Riksvei 22; Nynorsk: Riksveg 22

Route information
- Length: 117.3 km (72.9 mi)

Location
- Country: Norway

Highway system
- Roads in Norway; National Roads; County Roads

Riksvei 22 (Rv22) runs between Hvam in Lillestrøm and Øra in Fredrikstad. The road is 117.3 km, of which 35.8 km is in Akershus and 81.5 km in Østfold.

== Route ==
Route: Hvam - Kjeller - Lillestrøm - Vinsnes - Fetsund, crossing Glomma - south, and then east through Øyeren - Båstad - Skjønhaug - Mysen - Rakkestad - Ise - Hafslund - Årum - Torp - Sellebakk - Lundheim - Øra.

Prior to 1 January 2010, the road ran between Gjelleråsen and Halden, see fylkesvei 22. In March 2019, the road was extended from Rakkestad to Fredrikstad, replacing Riksvei 111.
