= Inga of Varteig =

Norwegian royal mistress (c. 1183–1234)

Coat of arms of Varteig Municipality featuring Inga of Varteig, mother of King Haakon IV

Inga Olafsdatter of Varteig (Inga Olafsdatter fra Varteig) (Varteig, Østfold, 1183 or c. 1185 – 1234 or 1235) was the mistress of King Haakon III of Norway and the mother of King Haakon IV of Norway.

== Biography ==
Inga, from Varteig in Østfold, maintained a relationship with King Haakon III who visited nearby in Borg (now Sarpsborg) during late 1203. King Haakon subsequently died in early 1204. His reign had been marked by competition between the Bagler and Birkebeiner factions for control of Norway during a period of civil war. King Haakon was succeeded as King of Norway, first by his nephew Guttorm Sigurdsson and later by the appointment of Inge Bardsson.

Shortly after the death of King Haakon, Inga gave birth to a son who she claimed was the child of the recently deceased king. Inga's claim was supported by several of King Haakon's Birkebeiner followers. However, her claim placed both her and her son in a dangerous position. Consequently, a group of Birkebeiner loyalists fled with Inga and her son from Lillehammer in eastern Norway over the mountains during the mid-winter 1205–06. The cross-country skiing trip continued north through Østerdalen to Trøndelag, where they came under the protection of King Inge.

After King Inge died in April 1217, Inga successfully performed a trial by ordeal to prove her son's right of succession. Her son Haakon succeeded to the Norwegian throne at the age of 13. Reportedly Inga became seriously ill and died before Christmas in Bergen during 1234.

== See also ==
- Birkebeinerrennet
- Civil war era in Norway

== Primary Source ==
The primary source of information regarding Inga of Varteig is from the Saga of Haakon Haakonarson which was written following the death of King Haakon IV.

== Other sources ==
- Jakobsson, Ármann (2005) Royal Biography, in A Companion to Old Norse-Icelandic Literature and Culture (Blackwell) ISBN 0-631-23502-7
- Thuesen, Nils Petter (1991) Norges dronninger gjennom tusen år (Oslo: Tiden Norsk Forlag) ISBN 82-10034-58-8
- Tordarson, Sturla (2008) Håkon Håkonssons saga (Thorleif Dahls Kulturbibliotek) ISBN 978-82-03-19367-5

== Related Reading ==
- Helle, Knut (1995) Under kirke og kongemakt: 1130-1350 (Aschehougs Norgeshistorie) ISBN 8203220312
- Koht, Halvdan (1926) Norske dronningar. Særprent frå Syn og Segn (Oslo: Det Norske Samlaget)
