= Kala, Sarpsborg =

Coordinates: 59°15′50″N 11°10′10″E

Kala is a small place east of Sarpsborg in southeastern Norway, or more precisely at Borgenhaugen. It mainly consists of the residential areas Kalakroken and Kalaveien. It also shares its name with the trotting track Kalabanen.

Kala is 15 minutes walking distance to Isesjøen
