= Leirvik (disambiguation) =

Leirvik may refer to:

== Places ==
- Leirvik, a town in Stord municipality, Vestland county, Norway
- Leirvik, Alver, a village in Alver municipality, Vestland county, Norway
- Leirvik, Finnmark, a village in Hammerfest municipality, Finnmark county, Norway
- Leirvik, Hyllestad, a village in Hyllestad municipality, Vestland county, Norway
- Leirvík, a village in Eystur municipality in the Faroe Islands
- Lerwick (Old Norse: Leirvik, Icelandic: Leirvík), a burgh in the Shetland Islands, United Kingdom

== Other ==
- Leirvík ÍF, a football club playing in Leirvík in the Faroe Islands

== See also ==
- Lervik, a village in Fredrikstad municipality, Østfold county, Norway
