= Hjorth =

Hjorth is a surname. Notable people with the surname include:

- Berndt August Hjorth (1862–1937), Swedish businessman
- Bror Hjorth (1894–1968), Swedish sculptor, painter and art professor
- Daniel Hjorth (1931–2020), Swedish literary scholar and publisher
- Emma Hjorth (1858–1921), Norwegian educator and founder of the country's first large-scale institution for people with intellectual disabilities
- Greg Hjorth (1963–2011), Australian mathematician and chess International Master
- Jakob Hjorth (born 1994), Danish former footballer
- Jesper Hjorth (born 1975), Danish footballer
- Magnus Hjorth (born 1983), Swedish jazz pianist
- Maria Hjorth (born 1973), Swedish golfer
- Noela Hjorth (1940–2016), Australian artist and builder of houses as works of "living structures"
- Paulette Moreno Hjorth (born 1969), former tennis player from Hong Kong
- Peder Christian Hjorth (1792–1855), Norwegian politician
- Ralph Hjorth (1883–1970), Australian politician
- Søren Hjorth (1801–1870), Danish railway pioneer and inventor
- Viktor Hjorth (born 2005), Danish footballer
- Vigdis Hjorth (born 1959), Norwegian novelist

== See also ==
- 6119 Hjorth, a main-belt asteroid
- Hjorth Hill, a mountain of Victoria Land, Antarctica
