= Hasle =

Hasle may refer to:

== Places ==
=== Denmark ===
- Hasle, Aarhus
- Hasle, Bornholm

=== Norway ===
- Hasle, Oslo
  - Hasle (station), a metro station at Hasle, Oslo
  - Hasle-Løren IL, an association football club
- Hasle, Østfold

=== Switzerland ===
- Hasle, Lucerne in the canton of Lucerne
  - Hasle LU railway station
- Hasle bei Burgdorf in the canton of Bern

== People ==
- Grethe Rytter Hasle (3 January 1920 – 9 November 2013), a Norwegian planktologist
