= Sandbakken, Sarpsborg =

Norwegian settlement

Coordinates: 59°14′36″N 11°11′23″E

Sandbakken is an urban settlement in Sarpsborg municipality, Norway. Sandbakken located on Klavestadhaugen, a few kilometers southeast of the Sarpsborg city centre. Before municipal amalgamation in 1992, Sandbakken belonged to Skjeberg municipality.
