= Jelsnes =

Village in Sarpsborg Municipality, Norway

Coordinates: 59°22′40″N 11°09′39″E

Jelsnes is a village in Sarpsborg municipality, Norway. Its population is 308. Jelsnes is located in the north of Tunøya, and belonged to Tune municipality before 1992. The mayor of Sarpsborg, Sindre Martinsen-Evje, comes from Jelsnes.
