= Yven =

Borough of Sarpsborg, Norway

Coordinates: 59°16′47″N 11°03′53″E

Yven is a borough in the city of Sarpsborg in Østfold, Norway. It is located east of the city centre on the west side of the Glomma river between Sarpsborg and Fredrikstad. Yven was previously assigned to the former municipality of Tune. As of 1885, the village was estimated to have had 297 inhabitants.

== Etymology ==
The Old Norse name of the village was 'Yvin'. The name is based on the word 'vi', indicating a pagan site of sacrifice.

== Industry ==
Yven hosted a ship-building industry in the late 19th century, but this production was discontinued around the turn of the century. In 1912 A/S Yven Papirfabrikk ('Yven Paper Mill') was established.
