= HEPRO =

Public health project in Northern Europe

HEPRO (Health and Social Well-being in the Baltic Sea Region) was a public health project running from 2005-2008. The project was part-financed by the European Union as part of the BSR INTERREG IIIB programme, and managed by Østfold County Council in Norway.

The national Healthy Cities networks in the Baltic Sea Region and the World Health Organization both supported HEPRO. The HEPRO concept was based on the principles of the WHO "Health for All" strategy and Local Agenda 21.

32 partners from 8 countries participated in the HEPRO project. These were Norway, Finland, Sweden, Denmark, Poland, Estonia, Lithuania, and Latvia. The partners represented institutions, cities, municipalities, and regions from diverse and challenged parts of the Baltic Sea Region.

== Aims ==
HEPRO aimed to integrate health considerations into spatial planning and development. Strong emphasis was given to empowerment; including equity, participatory governance and solidarity, collaboration and action to address the determinants of health. The project also aimed to make an important contribution to a sustainable public health policy in Europe.

== Results ==
Among the results from the project were the HEPRO planning model, the HEPRO survey model, a questionnaire that was answered by 33000 respondents in the Baltic Sea Region, an interactive webpage and a database of results for future research purposes. It is intended that HEPRO will be followed-up by a new project that builds upon its results and experiences.

=== The HEPRO planning model ===
The HEPRO planning model is a systematic approach in six steps linked together in a "planning circle". Because policymaking is a continuous process, the different stages in the circle do not have to follow a fixed order. Implementation of one public health activity can go on simultaneously with efforts to create attention and to put other activities on the political agenda.

HEPRO was regarded as a territorial and cross-sectorial approach to planning that sought political power in order to improve living conditions, and as an institution building process. The intention was that after the project, the communities would have a better capacity to lead themselves, to focus their challenges, organise and help themselves, and to learn from their experiences.

=== The HEPRO survey model ===
The EUROHEPRO survey in 2006 included questions about issues influencing health and well being, ranging from health risks to individuals, to social environment and socio-economic status.

The conceptual framework, called the HEPRO model, is described as a broad social, physical and spatial health concept where health and well-being was viewed as something more than just absence of disease and illness. The main focus of the HEPRO model is health, as defined by the various professional actors in the field, as well as by the citizens themselves, or other important actors.
