= Stikkaåsen =

Village in Sarpsborg Municipality, Norway

Coordinates: 59°20′12″N 11°0′20″E

Stikkaåsen is a village in Sarpsborg municipality, Norway, located northwest of Sarpsborg city. Its population is 285. Before 1992, Stikkaåsen was a part of Tune municipality.
