= Mørkfoss =

- Village
- Interactive map of Mørkfoss
- Coordinates: 59°39′32″N 11°13′33″E
- Time zone: UTC+01:00 (CET)

Mørkfoss is a small village in Indre Østfold municipality, Østfold, Norway. It is located in the southern end of lake Øyeren, at the continuation of Glomma river. Mørkfoss has traces of a dam construction which was built in connection to the Solbergfoss power plant.

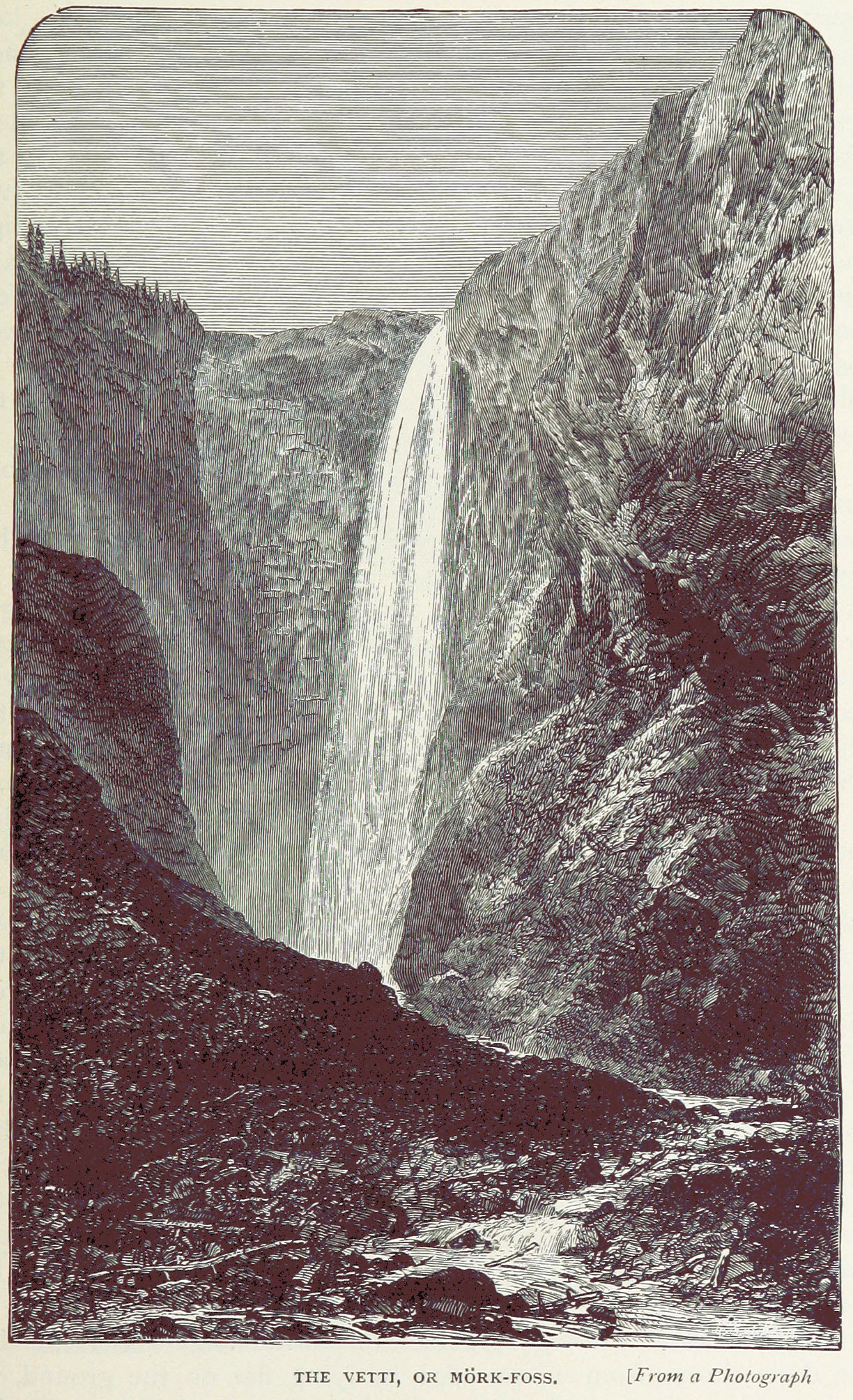
The Vetti, or Mørkfoss
