= Solbergfoss Line =

Railway line in Norway

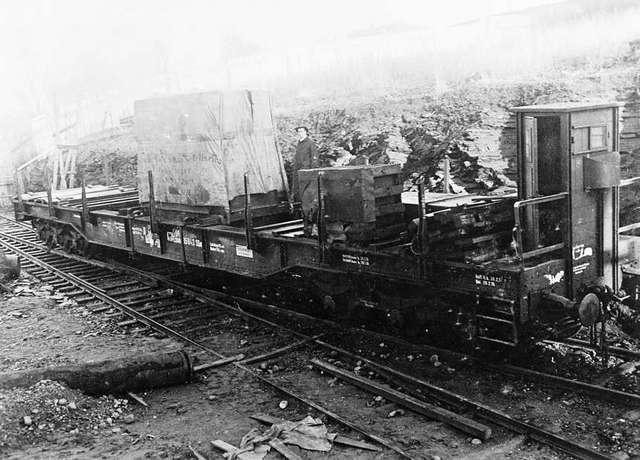

Overview
- Native name: Solbergfossbanen
- Status: Abandoned
- Owner: Oslo Lysverker and Norwegian Water Resources and Energy Directorate
- Termini: Askim Station; Solbergfoss
- Stations: 5

Service
- Type: Railway
- System: Rail transport in Norway

History
- Opened: 1918

Technical
- Line length: 7.9 km (4.9 mi)
- Number of tracks: Single
- Track gauge: Standard gauge

The Solbergfoss Line (Norwegian: Solbergfossbanen) was a 7.9-kilometer (4.9 mi) railway line which ran from Askim Station to Solbergfoss Power Station, entirely in Askim, Norway. The single-track, standard gauge railway was an industrial railway operated by the power station owned by Oslo Lysverker and the Norwegian Water Resources and Energy Directorate.

The line was completed in 1918. It was originally planned to be demolished in 1922, but the passenger trains proved popular and it continued in use until 1965. From 1928 it was served using railcars. The tracks were demolished in 1970

== Route ==
The Solbergfoss Line ran from Askim Station to Solbergfoss, entirely located within the municipality of Askim. The Line was 7.9 kilometers (4.9 mi) long, branching off from the Eastern Østfold Line. The line was standard gauge, but never equipped with a signaling system. The line did not have any stations, only four flag stops in addition to Askim Station. As the line was planned to be temporary, it received a low standard. The minimum curve radius was 150 meters (490 ft) and nearly 20 percent of the line has a gradient of 2.5 percent. The line had rails weighing 30 kg/m (60 lb/ft).

The line started at Askim Station. After 2.17 km or 1.35 mi the line crosses over the 33-meter or 108-foot Kolstad Bridge. It reached Onstad (3.4 km or 2.1 mi) and then crossed Skaarud Bridge (4.20 km or 2.61 mi) before reaching Tømt (6.0 km or 3.7 mi) and Oppegaard. The terminus was at Solbergfoss (7.90 km or 4.91 mi). There was en engine shed there.

Little of the line remains. There are some tracks left in the streets of Askim. The first 3 kilometers (2 mi) out of Askim have been converted to a pathway, as has the section from Onstad to Tømt and the last 0.5 kilometers (0.3 mi) to Solbergfoss. The engine shed at Solbergfoss remains.

== History ==
Oslo Municipality bought Wittenberg–Halfredfoss in Glomma in 1898. They issued an engineering competition, which concluded with that also Solbergfoss should be part of a hydropower station. Oslo Municipality therefore bought Solbergfoss in 1906. A committee was appointed in 1907 and recommended two years later that Mørkfoss and Solbergfoss be built at the same time. Construction started in 1913. An agreement with the government allowed for a joint construction of the power from 1916. The power station was dimensioned for a production of 115 megawatts and 670 GWh/year.

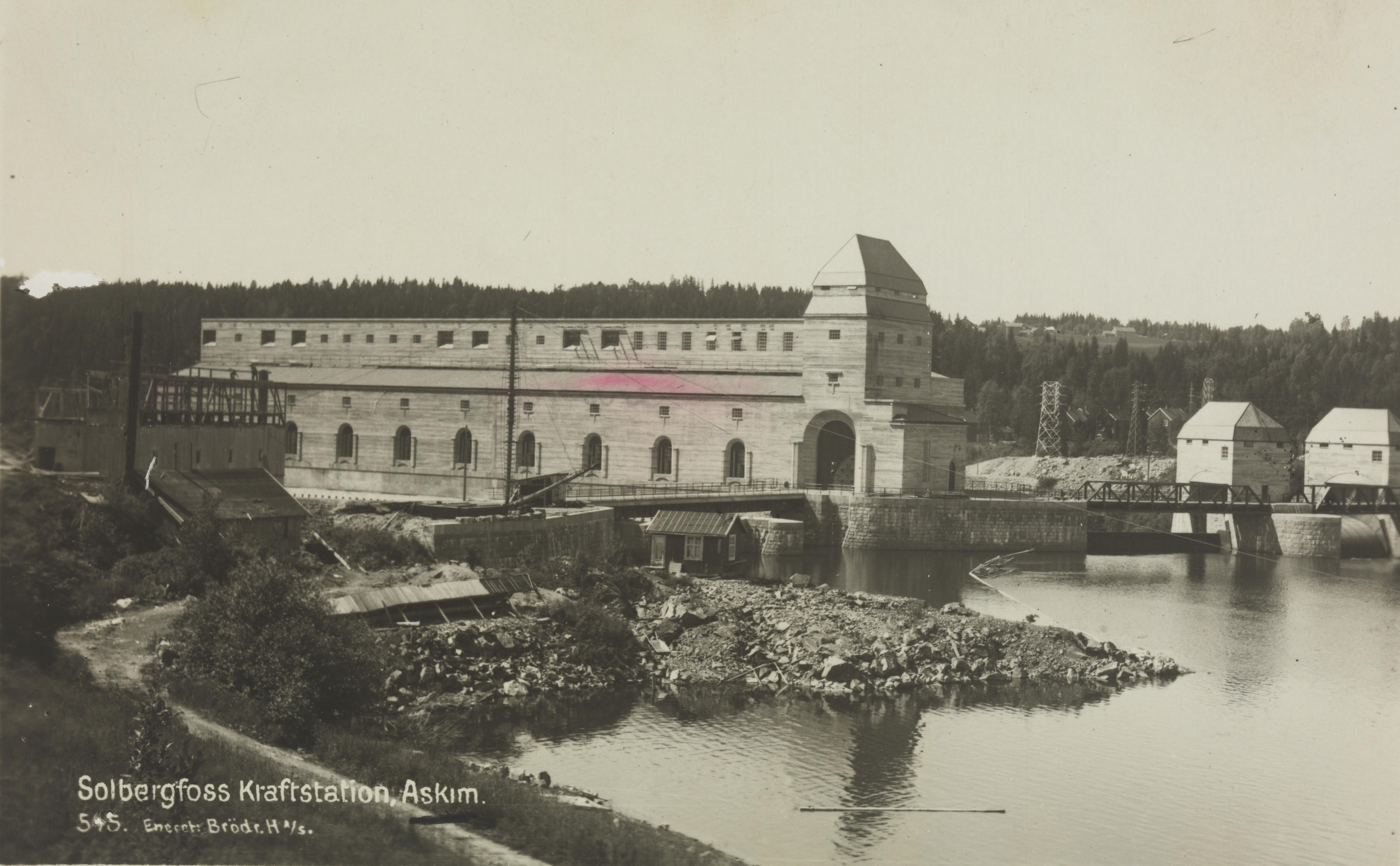
Solberg Power Station sometime between 1925 and 1930

To allow for easier construction, Oslo Lysverker decided to build a railway line from Askim to the construction site. It was planned to only be used during the construction period, and was therefore built with a low standard. Construction of the track was carried out in 1913, and the government issued permission for a temporary line on 1 May 1914. The line was fully operational in 1918.

During the construction period the railway rented some compartment coaches from the Norwegian State Railways (NSB). A Danish steam locomotive was bought in 1919 and an NSB Class 9 was borrowed in 1920. The latter was needed to overcome the snow during winter. Passenger transport proved popular and when construction of the power station was completed in 1922, there was public demand for operations to continue. Another advantage was that it would allow heavy machinery and other materials to be transported to the power station at a later date.

Passenger traffic was limited, and there were never more than two to three daily round trips. The first railcar was bought in 1928, allowing both the remaining steam locomotives to be chopped in 1930. Freight trains to the power station were thereafter operated using a shunter from SB. A second railcar was bought in 1938. From the 1950s there was increasing car traffic, taking patronage away from the railway. From the late 1950s to 1965 most of the traffic was as a school transport. The last major transport to the power station took place in 1948.

As operations had run with a loss for many years, the power station owners decided to terminate operations from 4 January 1965. Initially operations were merely temporarily placed on hood. The tracks were kept and the railcars parked at the depot at Solbergfoss. A few freight trains were run, but this stopped after one derailed. The newly formed Norwegian Railway Club was given the two railcars in 1969. These were driven to Askim and then transported onward to the Krøderen Line. They were renovate and have since become part of the heritage railway operations there. The tracks were demolished in 1970.

== Rolling stock ==
During the power station construction, the company hired in locomotives. The two most used was St Olof and Bayreuth, the latter which was a Bavarian D IV built in 1883 and delivered to the Royal Bavarian State Railways. When permanent traffic commenced in 1922, the company bought two used locomotives. One was bought from the Lemvig–Thyborøn Line in Denmark in 1918. The second was a used NSB Class 9 which was procured in 1922.

The railway bought two railcars for its passenger services, named Gamla and Padda. Both were two-axled and powered with a gasoline prime mover. Gamla was built by Hässleholm and seating for 17 passengers. It was powered by a 49-kW (66-HP) Willys-Knight engine. Padda was bought from NSB and was built by Skabo. It was powered by a 98-kW (133-HP) Hercules engine. It had space for 24 passengers.

== Bibliography ==
- Aspenberg, Nils Carl (1994). Glemte spor: boken om sidebanenes tragiske liv (in Norwegian). Oslo: Baneforlaget. ISBN 82-91448-00-0.
- Bjerke, Thor; Holom, Finn (2004). Banedata 2004 (in Norwegian). Hamar / Oslo: Norwegian Railway Museum / Norwegian Railway Club. ISBN 82-90286-28-7.
- Langård, Geir-Widar; Ruud, Leif-Harald (2005). Sydbaneracer og Skandiapil – Glimt fra Østfoldbanen gjennom 125 år (in Norwegian). Oslo: Norwegian Railway Club. ISBN 978-82-90286-29-8.
- Ljøgodt, Lars (1976). Oslo lysverker (in Norwegian). Oslo: Oslo Lysverker.
