= Borgenhaugen =

Borough of Sarpsborg, Norway

Coordinates: 59°16′02″N 11°10′38″E

Borgenhaugen is a borough in the city of Sarpsborg, Norway, located east of the city centre. Before 1992, Borgenhaugen was a part of Skjeberg municipality. The old Skjeberg council hall (rådhus) is located here.

== Local placenames ==
- Surfellingen
- Kala
- Nygårdshaugen
- Hafslund
- Nordberg
- Bede
- Navestad
- Borgen

== Attractions ==
- Isesjøen
- Kalabanen
