= Kambo, Norway =

- Interactive map of Kambo, Norway
- Coordinates: 59°28′N 10°42′E
- Country: Norway
- County: Østfold
- Municipality: Moss
- Time zone: UTC+1 (CET)
  - Summer (DST): UTC+2 (CEST)
- Postal code: 1538

Kambo is a village in the municipality of Moss, in Østfold county, Norway.

Kambo Station, the local railway station, is served by commuter train line L21 between Skøyen (via Oslo) and Moss.

== See also ==
- List of villages in Østfold
