= Hobøl =

Hobøl Municipality Hobøl kommune
- Former municipality
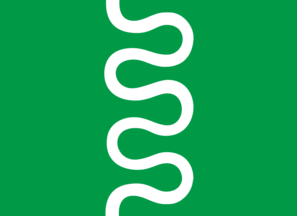
- Flag Coat of arms

- Østfold within Norway

- Hobøl within Østfold
- Coordinates: 59°35′35″N 10°56′45″E
- Country: Norway
- County: Østfold
- Administrative centre: Elvestad

Government
  - Mayor (2007): Kjell Håvard Jensen (FrP)

Area (upon dissolution)
  - Total: 140 km^{2} (54 sq mi)
  - Land: 139 km^{2} (54 sq mi)
  - Rank: #365 in Norway

Population (2004)
  - Total: 4,504
  - Rank: #214 in Norway
  - Density: 32/km^{2} (83/sq mi)
  - Change (10 years): ▲ +13.4%
- Demonym(s): Hobøling or Hobling

Official language
  - Norwegian form: Neutral
- Time zone: UTC+01:00 (CET)
  - Summer (DST): UTC+02:00 (CEST)
- ISO 3166 code: NO-0138
- Website: Official website

Hobøl was a municipality in Østfold county, Norway. The administrative centre of the municipality was the village of Elvestad. Hobøl is situated about 40 kilometres (25 mi) southeast of Oslo. The parish of Haabøl was established as a municipality on 1 January 1838 (see formannskapsdistrikt).

The largest village in Hobøl was Tomter, whose railway station is served by Eastern Østfold Line. Other villages in the municipality were Knapstad, Ringvoll, and the middle part of the municipality which is called Hobøl.

Hobøl was suggested as the replacement site for a new airport to replace Fornebu, and in 1972 the Norwegian parliament voted to build it there. The 1973 oil crisis postponed that plan, and the new airport was finally built at Gardermoen, north of Oslo.

== General information ==
=== Name ===
The municipality (originally the parish) is named after the old Hobøl farm (Old Norse: Hóbœli), since the first church was built here. The first element is hór or hár meaning "high". The last element is bœli which means "farm". Thus the name means "the farm lying on a high ground". Prior to 1889 the name was written "Haabøl".

=== Coat-of-arms ===
The Coat-of-arms is from modern times. It was granted on 30 August 1985; it shows the municipality as seen from above. The municipality is mainly formed by a large valley, cut by the meandering Hobølelva river.

Number of minorities (1st and 2nd generation) in Hobøl by country of origin in 2017
Ancestry	Number
Poland	207
Lithuania	129
Sweden	48
Germany	41
Denmark	36

== Sister cities ==
The following cities are twinned with Hobøl:

- - Rõngu, Tartu County, Estonia
