= St. Peter's Church, Halden =

Coordinates: 59°07′31″N 11°23′16″E

St. Peter's Church
- St. Peter kirke
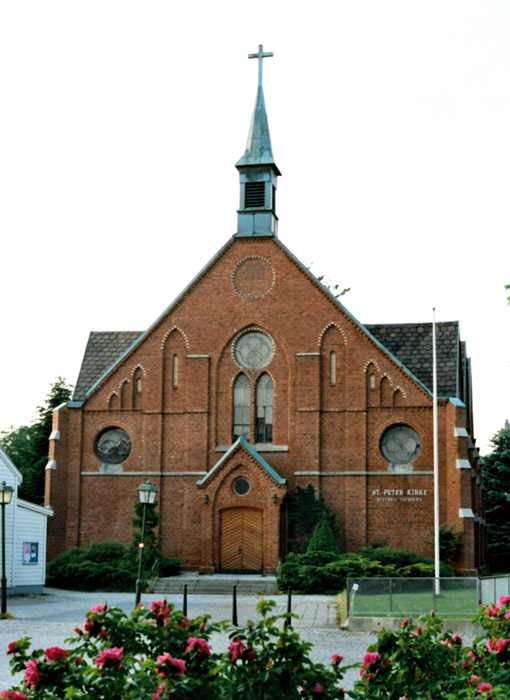
- Location: Halden
- Country: Østfold county
- Denomination: Roman Catholic Church

The St. Peter's Church (Norwegian: St. Peter kirke) is a parish of the Roman Catholic Church in Halden in Østfold county, Norway. It was consecrated on October 10, 1877.

The church was designed by Dutch architect Pierre Cuypers. Due to a translation-related misunderstanding, he had originally designed the church for a population of about 10,000 people, corresponding to the entire population of the Halden at the time. Catholics in the city then amounted to about 20 people. The plans were modified to about 1/3 the size originally projected.

The church has neo-Gothic elements and was built in red brick.

== See also ==
- Catholic Church in Norway
- Roman Catholic Diocese of Oslo
