= Isesjøen =

Lake in Østfold, Norway

- Location within Østfold
- Location: Sarpsborg, Østfold, Norway
- Coordinates: 59°16′39″N 11°13′27″E
- Basin countries: Norway
- Surface area: 6.20 km^{2} (2.39 sq mi)
- Shore length^{1}: 25.16 km (15.63 mi)
- Surface elevation: 38 m (125 ft)
- References: NVE
- ^{1} Shore length is not a well-defined measure.

Isesjøen is a lake in the municipality of Sarpsborg in Østfold county, Norway.

== See also ==
- List of lakes in Norway
