= Trømborg =

- Coordinates: 59.5067°N 11.36°E

Trømborg is a small village in the municipality of Eidsberg, Norway. Its population (2019) is 263. Footballer Rune Buer Johansen began his career here.
