= Skivika =

Village in Fredrikstad Municipality, Norway

Skivika (also called Skeidarvik and Skjærvika) is a village in the municipality of Fredrikstad, Norway. Its population (2005) is 1,117, of which 5 people live within the border of the neighboring municipality Sarpsborg.
