= Slitu =

Village in Indre Østfold, Østfold, Norway

Coordinates: 59.5844°N 11.2628°E

Slitu is a village in the former municipality of Eidsberg, Norway, now part of the municipality of Indre Østfold. Its population (2005) is 543, of which seven people lived within the border of the neighboring former municipality of Trøgstad. now also part of the municipality of Indre Østfold.
