= Korshavn, Norway =

Fishing village in Hvaler, Østfold, Norway

Korshavn
- Village
- Interactive map of Korshavn
- Location within Østfold Location within Norway
- Coordinates: 59.07201°N 11.0069°E
- Country: Norway
- Region: Eastern Norway
- County: Østfold
- Municipality: Hvaler

Korshavn is a fishing village in Hvaler municipality, Østfold county, Norway.
