= Engalsvik =

Village in Fredrikstad municipality, Norway

Coordinates: 59°15′N 10°44′E

Engelsviken is a village in Fredrikstad municipality, Norway. As of 2003 it is considered by Statistics Norway as a part of the Greater Lervik area.

== In popular culture ==
In the television show Bones, a real human skeleton tied to a cross was found being used as a stage prop for a Black Metal band in Engelsvik.
