= Rød, Østfold =

Village in Norway

Coordinates: 59.0747°N 10.9403°E

Rød is a village on the island Asmaløy in Hvaler municipality, Norway. Its population (SSB 2005) is 330 and it includes a secondary school. Like the rest of the island, it is within the boundaries of the Ytre Hvaler National Park.

Rød and Røed (identical pronunciations) are relatively common farm names in southeastern parts of Norway, hence both relatively common as family names and place names, especially in the county of Østfold.

== Etymology ==
Rød and Røed are shortened versions of the Norwegian dialect word røddning (or rødning), meaning cleared place. Other farm names with the same meaning are Rud, Ruud, Rydning, and Rynning.
