= Høysand =

Village

Coordinates: 59°11′30″N 11°11′26″E

Høysand is a village in Sarpsborg municipality, Norway. Located just south of the village Skjeberg, it is a part of the urban area of the same name, which has a population of 1,919 at the 2006 census.
