= Ørmen =

- Village
- Location in Østfold Ørmen (Norway)
- Coordinates: 59°17′56.32″N 10°53′30.57″E
- Country: Norway
- Region: Eastern Norway
- County: Østfold
- District: Eastern Norway
- Municipality: Fredrikstad
- Elevation: 10 m (33 ft)
- Time zone: UTC+01:00 (CET)
  - Summer (DST): UTC+02:00 (CEST)

Ørmen is a village in the municipality of Fredrikstad, Norway. In the past, the village was also a train station on the Østfold Line. The station was opened on 1 October 1914 although passenger service ended 1 April 1957. The station then functioned as a stop until it closed on 29 May 1983.

Ørmen formerly belonged to the municipality of Onsøy. This changed when the municipalities of Frederikstad, Kråkerøy, Onsøy, Rolvsøy og Borge, in Østfold merged on 1 January 1994. The new merged municipality was named Frederikstad.

Although some people believe the village is mentioned in David Bowie's song "Blackstar," it is unlikely that this is the case. The lyrics are the subject of many and varied interpretations, and "the villa of Ormen" in Blackstar is unlikely to be a physical location.
