= Peder Christian Hjorth =

Norwegian politician

Peder Christian Hjorth (February 16 1792 – 1 January 1855) was a Norwegian politician.

He served in the Parliament of Norway during the term 1839–1841, representing the constituency Smaalenenes Amt. He made his living as a farmer.
