= Tosebygda =

Village in Indre Østfold, Norway

Tosebygda is a village in the municipality of Indre Østfold, Norway. It is located in the western part of Trøgstad, between Askim and Skjønhaug.

The post office was located in the general store, which was also the social hub of the village. In 1975, the postmaster in Moss proposed to close the post office. Tosebygda had its own postal code 1864 from 1 July 1911; written Tosebygden until 1921. The postal code was disused from 1 January 1992, with the area changing postal code to Tosebygda, 1860 Trøgstad

In April 1975, the community started building an association football field through volunteer labour (dugnad). After it was finished, a community house for civic organizations was built.

In 1990, there were eight births in Tosebygda, being described as "having secured the future of the village".
