= Skantebygda =

Village in Rakkestad municipality, Norway

Coordinates: 59°24′N 11°14′E

Skantebygda is a village in Rakkestad municipality, Norway, located in the agricultural area west of Rakkestad village.
