= Øyenkilen =

Village in Fredrikstad Municipality, Norway

Coordinates: 59.1717°N 10.8508°E

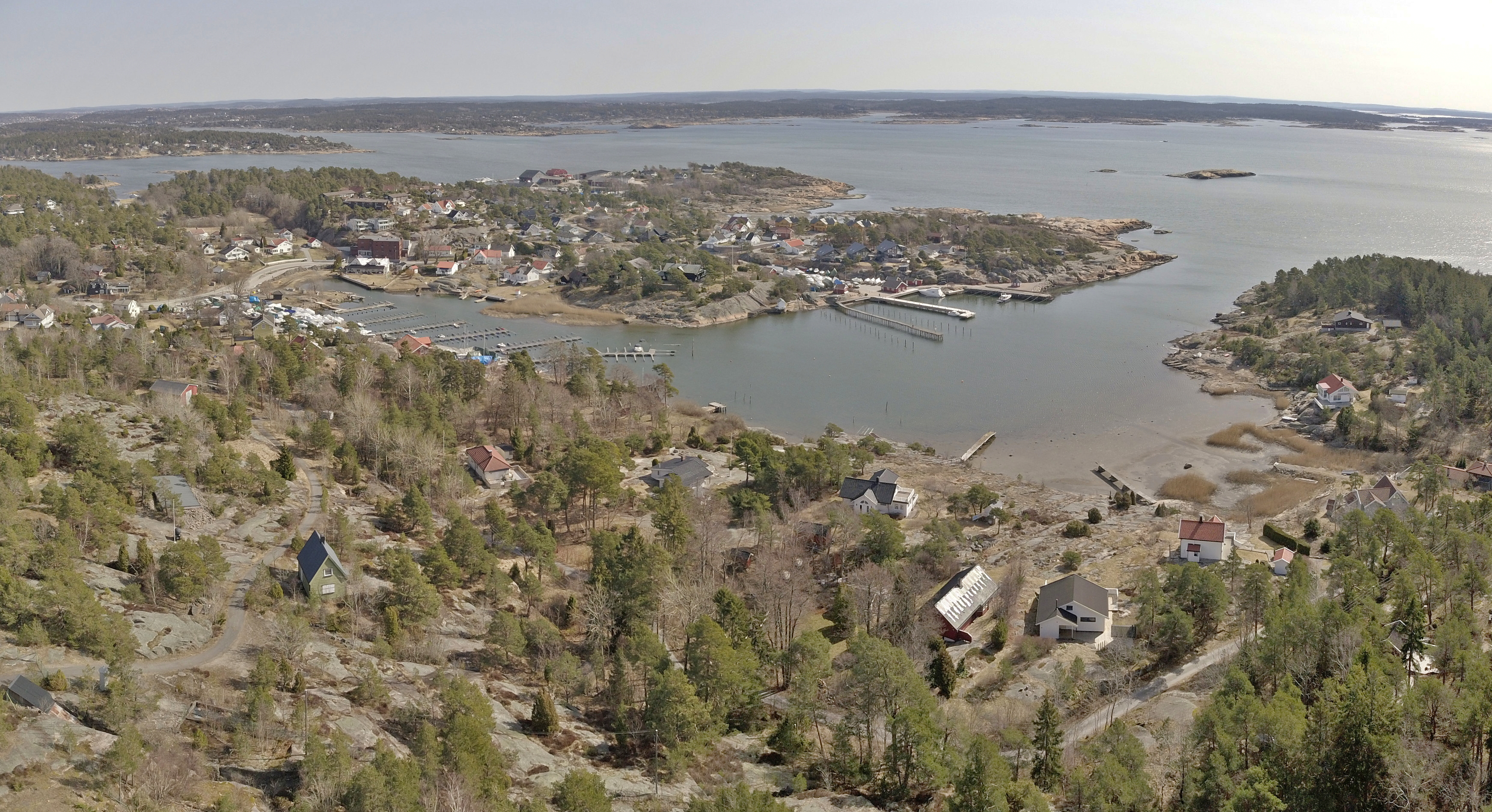
Øyenkilen in spring 2018

Øyenkilen is a village in the southern part of Fredrikstad municipality, Norway. Its population (SSB 2005) is 563.

== Economy ==
There is a marina and pier for small boats.
