= Hauge, Østfold =

Village in Hvaler municipality, Norway

Coordinates: 59.1017°N 10.8717°E

Hauge is a village on the island Vesterøy in Hvaler municipality, Norway. The origin of the name Hauge is from the Old Norse word haugr meaning mound. Its population (SSB 2005) is 320.
