= Alshus =

Village in Fredrikstad Municipality, Norway

Coordinates: 59°10′17″N 10°56′52″E

Alshus is a village in the municipality of Fredrikstad, Norway, situated on the island and former municipality of Kråkerøy. Its population (SSB 2005) is 1,019. Alshus is placed at the eastern coast of Kråkerøy (directly translated to Crow Island), lying next to Kallera and Femdal. The kids in this village is basically belonging to Lunde barneskole, and the youngsters at Kråkerøy Ungdomsskole. The two local sportsclubs is the blue-suitedTrolldalen IF and Kråkerøy IL in their white shirts and green shorts.

== Infrastructure ==
Alshus is basically connected by the main roads Alshusveien (The Alshus Road), H. O. Torgersensvei (The Hans Oskar Torgersen's Road) and Futerødveien (The Futerød Road). In the recent years, Alshusbuen (The Alshus Arc) is added. Alshusveien is the one to connect with the rest of the world.

== Misc ==
As the village is lying next to the River Glomma, who is actually the longest river in Norway, it played some kind of a role during the World War II. By the riverside, there still is two or three bunkers left, which is fully accessible for casual tourists. To enter this bunkers, you have to head for the H. O. Torgersensvei, then Fortveien and just look for the coast.

On the outskirts of the village are the headquarters of Kråkerøy MC-klubb.

Down by the riverside, there also is a beach called the Lieutenant Bay.
