= Rostadneset =

- Village
- Interactive map of Rostadneset
- Coordinates: 59.2923°N 10.9981°E

Area
  - Land: 305.1 km^{2} (117.8 sq mi)

Population
  - Total: 277
- Time zone: UTC+1
  - Summer (DST): UTC+2

Rostadneset is a village in the municipality of Fredrikstad, Norway, north of the city of Fredrikstad in the former municipality Rolvsøy. Its population (SSB 2005) is 277.
