= Slevik =

Village in Fredrikstad Municipality, Norway

Coordinates: 59°12′N 10°50′E

Slevik is a village in the southern part of Fredrikstad municipality, Norway. Its population (SSB 2005) is 990.
