= Våk =

Village in Våler Municipality, Norway

Coordinates: 59°27′0″N 10°48′0″E

Våk is a village in the municipality of Våler, Østfold, Norway. Its population (2005) is 1,021.
