= Grimstad, Østfold =

Village in Råde Municipality, Norway

Coordinates: 59°21′44″N 10°48′44″E

Grimstad is a village in Råde municipality, Norway. Since 2002 it has been considered a part of the Ryggebyen urban area.
