= Saltnes, Østfold, Norway =

Village in Norway

Coordinates: 59°17′N 10°45′E

Saltnes
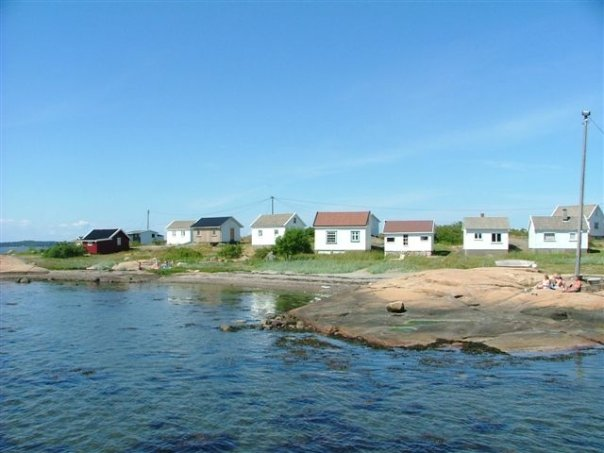
- View of summer cabins on Saltholmen peninsula
- Interactive map of Saltnes

Population (2016)
  - Total: 2,173

Saltnes is a village mostly situated in the municipality of Råde, Norway. Its population in 2015 was 2,173, of which 89 people live within the border of the neighboring municipality, Fredrikstad.

The etymology of the name derives from harvesting of salt in the area several hundred years ago.
