= Sandum =

- Village
- Interactive map of Sandum
- Coordinates: 60°06′18″N 11°05′02″E
- Time zone: UTC+01:00 (CET)

Sandum is a village in Rømskog municipality, Norway. Sandum is one of four districts (grunnkretser) in Rømskog, and had a population of 158 in 2001.
