= Glosli =

Village in Fredrikstad Municipality, Norway

Coordinates: 59°11′17″N 11°01′50″E

Glosli is a village in the eastern part of Fredrikstad municipality, Norway. Its population (SSB 2005) is 613.
