= Ise, Norway =

Village in Sarpsborg Municipality, Norway

Coordinates: 59°18′N 11°14′E

Ise is a village in Sarpsborg municipality, Norway. Its population is 733.
