= Fosby =

Village in Aremark Municipality, Norway

Coordinates: 59°13′N 11°42′E

Fosby is the administrative centre of Aremark, Norway. Its population in 2005 is 318.
