= Varteig =

Village in Sarpsborg municipality, Norway

Coordinates: 59°21′02″N 11°11′25″E

Varteig municipal coat of arms from 1979 showed Inga of Varteig, mother of King Håkon Håkonson

Varteig is a village in Sarpsborg and a former municipality in Østfold County, Norway.

== Summary ==
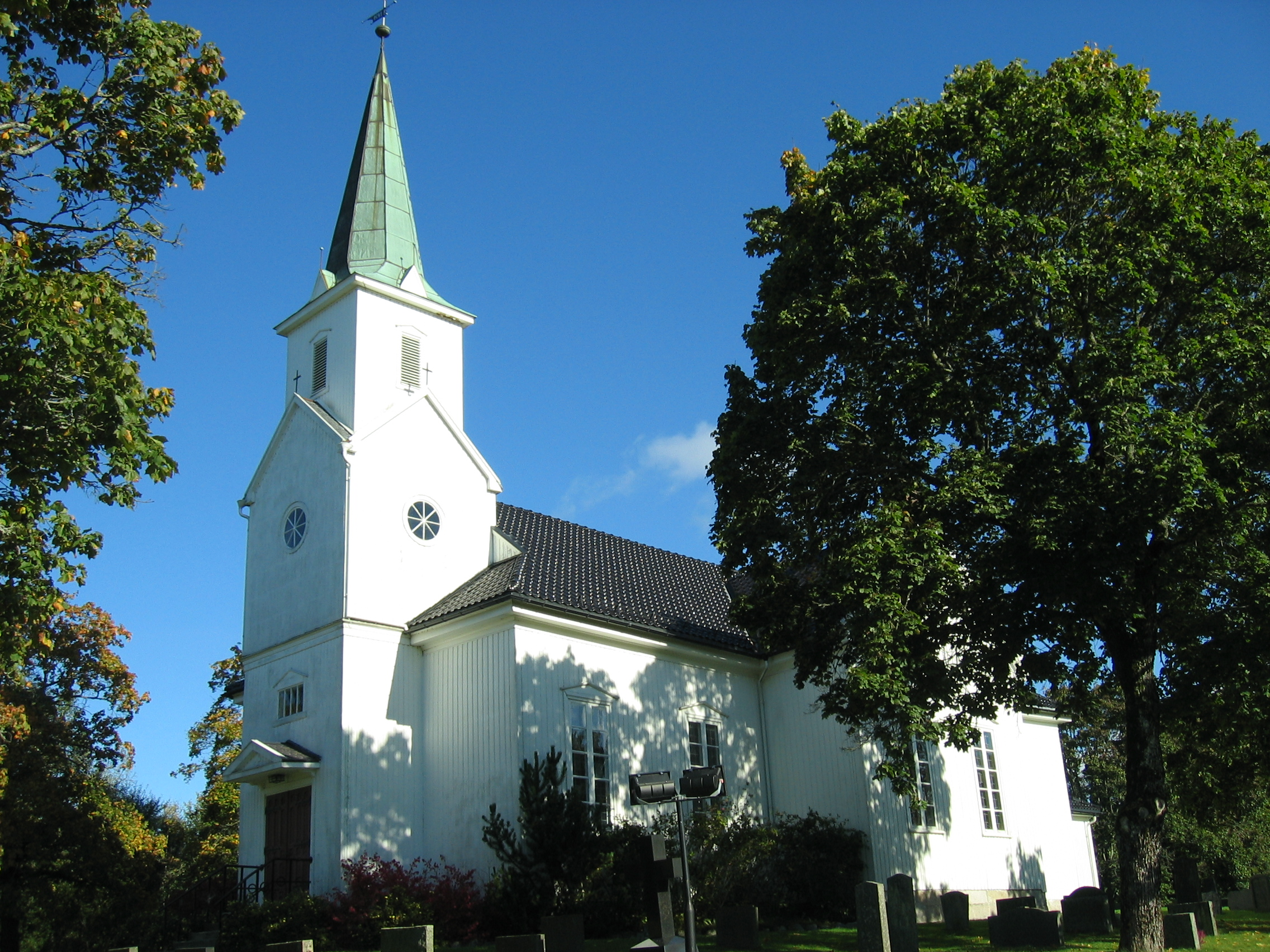
Varteig Church

Varteig is located north of the city of Sarpsborg and east of the Glomma river. Varteig was part of the Tune municipality until 1861. It was designated to be a municipality by a split from Tune in 1861. At that time Varteig had a population of 1,405. On 1 January 1992 a small part of the district Furuholmen, with 12 inhabitants, was moved to Rakkestad municipality. The rest of Varteig was incorporated into Sarpsborg along with Tune and Skjeberg.

Varteig is probably best known as the home place of Inga of Varteig (born about 1185, died 1234), mother of Håkon Håkonson, king of Norway from 1217 to 1263.

== Toponymy ==
The municipality (originally parish) is named after the farm of Varteig (Old Norse Varteigr). Varteig Church (Varteig kirke) was first built on its ground. The meaning of the first element is unknown, the last element is teigr m 'strip of field'.

== Other sources ==
- Dag Juvkam / Statistics Norway (1999). "Historisk oversikt over endringer i kommune- og fylkesinndelingen" (PDF).
