= Utgård =

Village in Hvaler Municipality, Norway

Coordinates: 59°05′N 10°52′E

Utgård is a village on the island of Vesterøy in Hvaler municipality, Norway. Its population (SSB 2023) is 336. To the south of it is the port and fishing village of Utgårdskilen.
