= Elvestad =

Village in Indre Østfold, Norway

Coordinates: 59°25′49″N 11°0′12″E

Elvestad is a traffic junction area and village in Indre Østfold, Østfold county, Norway. It is where the "Riksvei" (country road route) 120 and European route E18 cross each other. Riksvei 120 runs between Oslo Airport and the town of Moss, Østfold, moving through Gjerdrum and Lillestrøm municipalities in Akershus county.

Prior to the 2020 municipal merger, Elvestad served as the administrative centre of the former Hobøl municipality, with the municipality house situated near the intersection of the national main routes E18 and Riksvei 120.

Elvestad is also home to an asylum-seeker centre. Topographically, it is situated in a small valley that is around two kilometers wide at the widest point.

== Derivation of name ==
The words elv and stad are Norwegian for river and place respectively. The name Elvestad probably gets its name from the river Hobølelva, which follows Riksvei 120 and crosses E18 at the Elvestad intersection.
