= Svinndal =

Village in Våler Municipality, Østfold, Norway

Coordinates: 59.4253°N 11.01°E

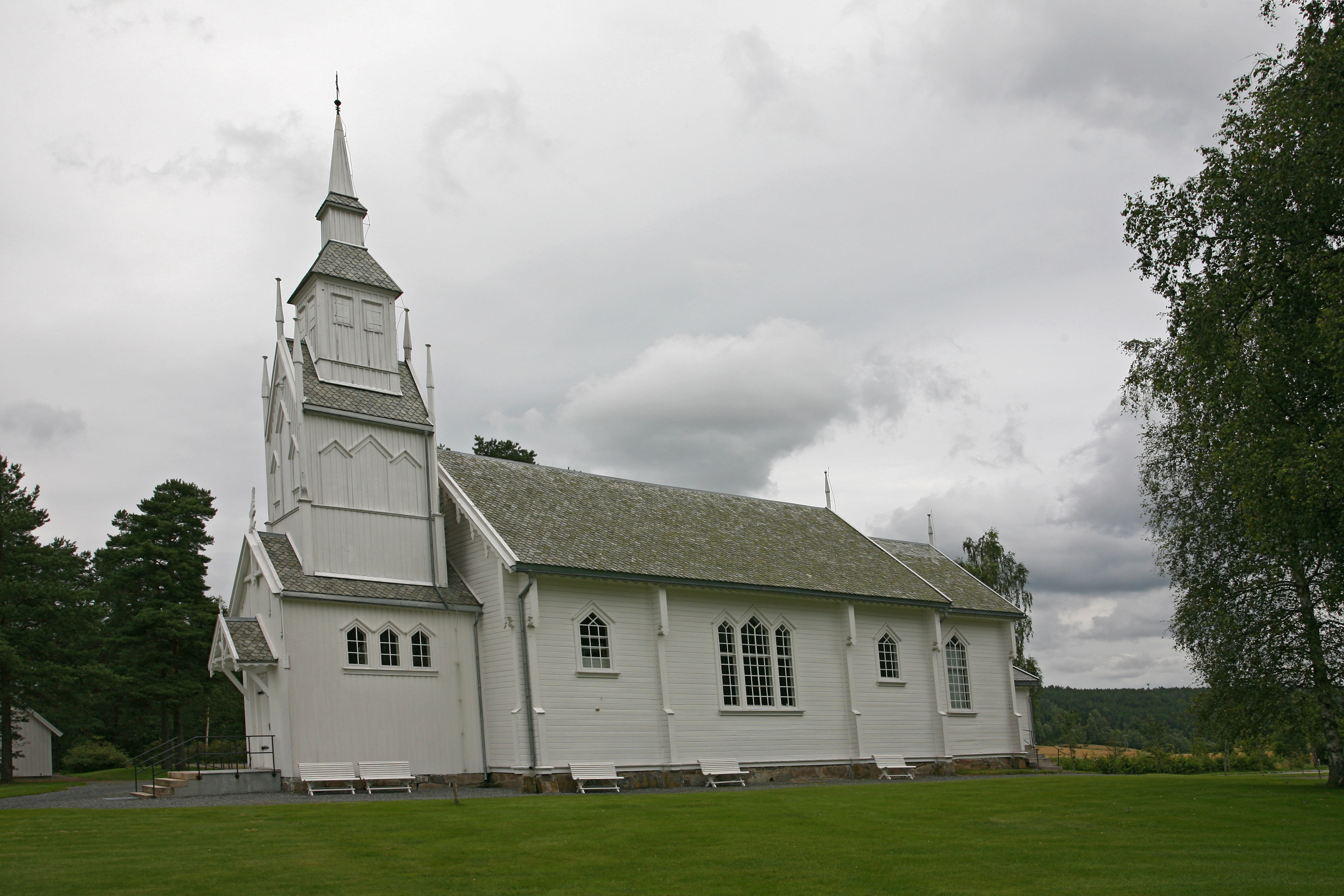
Svinndal Church

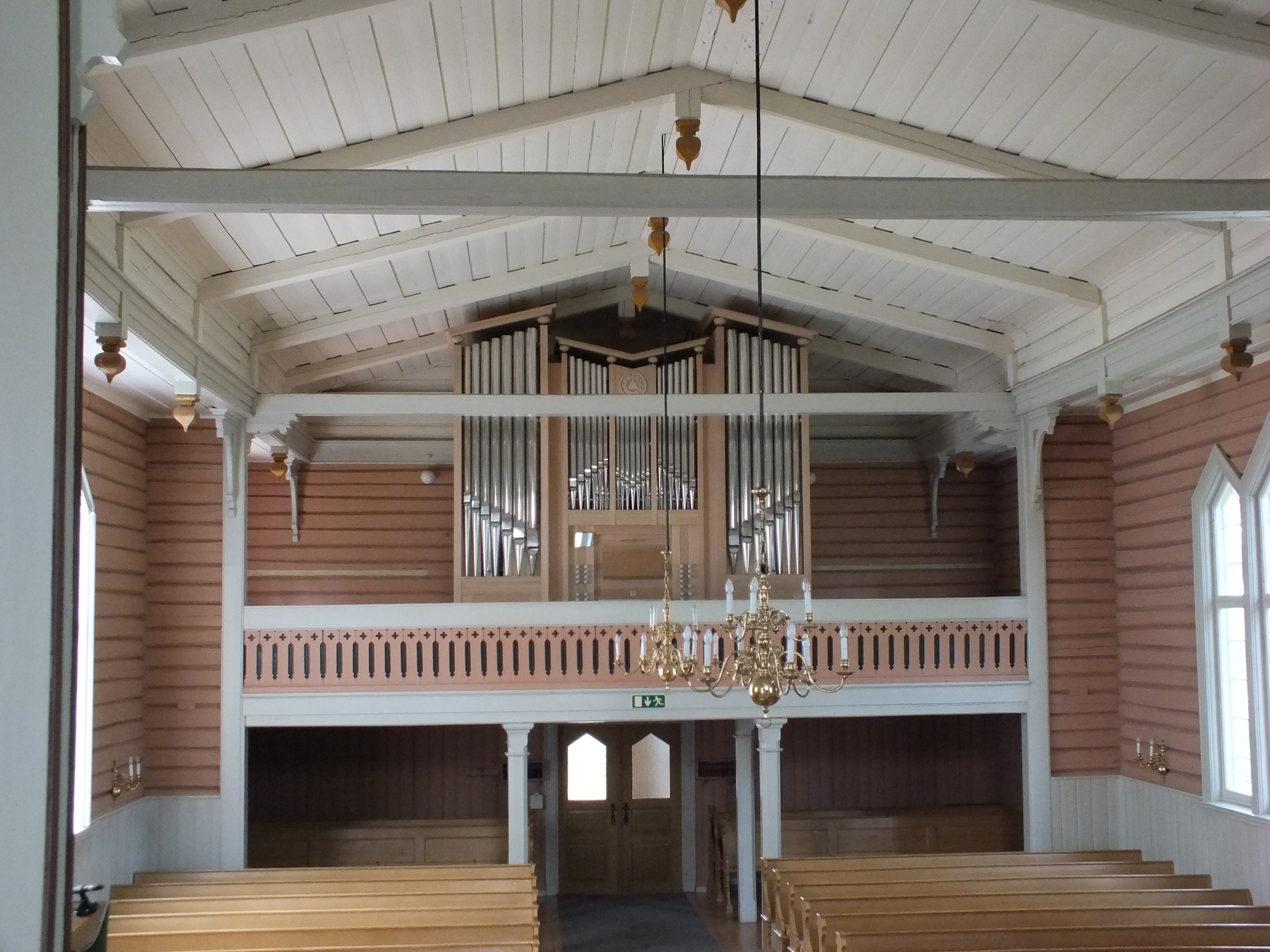
Church Organ and Choir loft

Svinndal is a village and parish in the municipality of Våler, Østfold, Norway. The population of the village (2009) is 353. Svinndal shares its coat-of-arms with Våler.

Svinndal church (Svinndal kirke) was constructed in mixed Gothic and Swiss style during 1856. The church was built of wood based upon an architectural design by Chr. H. Grosch. It replaced a prior church that burned down in 1854. The church is located on Fylkesvei 115 (Fv 115) which runs between Bjørkelangen in Aurskog-Høland and Rødsundet in Våler. The parish is associated with the Vestre Borgesyssel deanery of the Diocese of Borg.
