= Hasle, Østfold =

Village in Sarpsborg Municipality, Norway

Coordinates: 59°18′48″N 11°09′26″E

Hasle is a village in the municipality of Sarpsborg, Norway, located on the eastern bank of Glomma. Its population is 698. Before 1992 Hasle was a part of Varteig municipality.
