= Isebakke =

Village in Halden Municipality, Norway

Coordinates: 59.1144°N 11.3083°E

Isebakke is a village in the municipality of Halden, Norway. Its population (SSB 2005) is 770.
