= Ringvoll =

Village in Østfold county, Norway

Coordinates: 59.5589°N 10.8511°E

Ringvoll is a village in the municipality of Indre Østfold, Norway. Its population (2005) is 473.

It is around 15 km north of Moss and 45 km south of Oslo.
