= Tune, Norway =

Former municipality in Østfold, Norway

Coordinates: 59°17′32″N 11°05′00″E

Former coat of arms (1977–1991).

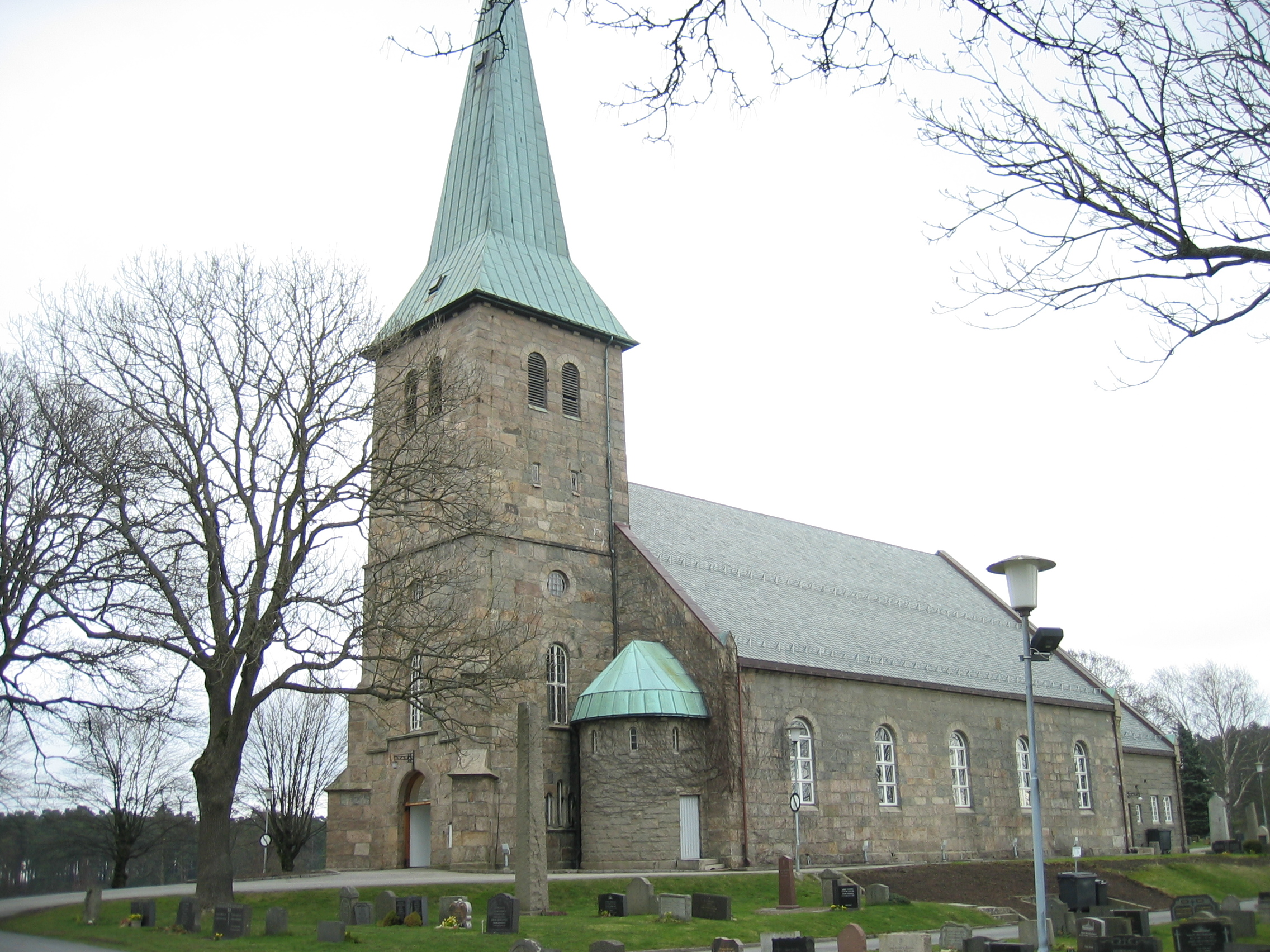
Tune Church, Sarpsborg, Norway

Tune is a former municipality in Østfold county, Norway. The former municipality originally covered the current Sarpsborg municipality with the exception of Skjeberg and with the addition of Rolvsøy.

== History ==
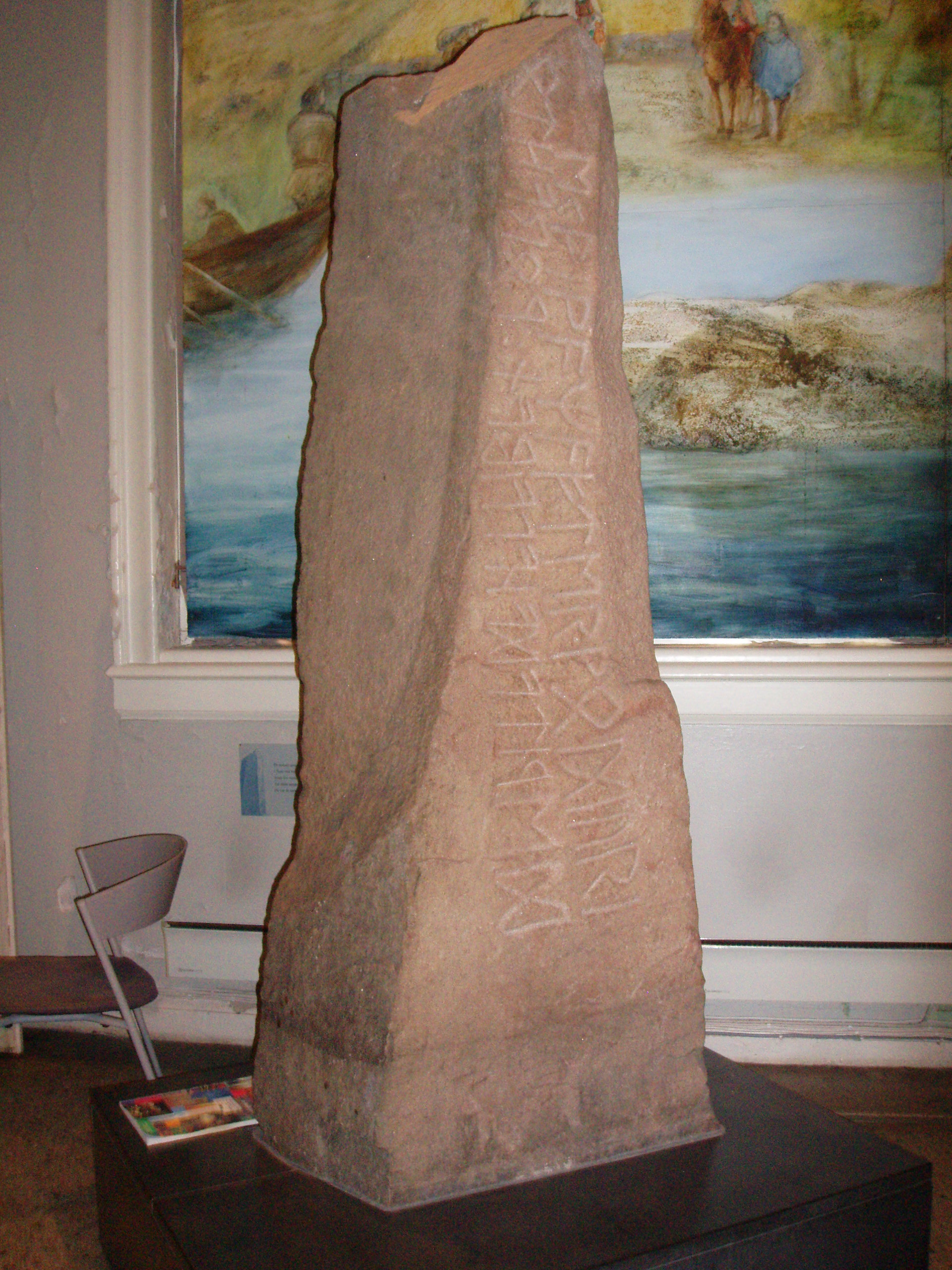
Tune Runestone

The parish of Tune was established as a municipality January 1, 1838 (see formannskapsdistrikt). The city of Sarpsborg was grounded and separated from Tune to constitute a separate administrative unit in 1839. The rural district of Varteig was separated from Tune in 1861, and the same thing happened with Rolvsøy on 1 January 1911, leaving Tune with a population of 8,040. Despite the separations Tune witnessed steady growth over the years.

Starting in 1884, a series of border adjustments which moved territory from Tune to Sarpsborg took place. Following the moving of an uninhabited part of Tune to Sarpsborg in 1884, parts with 696, 1,008, 66 and 10 inhabitants were moved to Sarpsborg in 1912, 1925, 1957 and 1980 respectively. On 1 January 1992 the rest of Tune, along with Skjeberg and Varteig municipalities, was incorporated into Sarpsborg. Prior to the merger Tune had a population of 15,143, and consisted of the parishes Tune and Greåker.

Tune church dating from 1910 is located at the southern end of Lake Tune. The Tune stone was found by the churchyard wall. The runestone was originally raised by Sarpsfossen, a waterfall. It is now displayed in the Museum of Cultural History in Oslo, Norway. Furthermore, a number of archaeological finds from both the Bronze Age and Iron Age, including a number of burial mounds between Tune church and the village of Greåker and noteworthy rock carving in Kalnes.

== Name ==
The municipality (originally the parish) was named after the old farm of Tune (Norse Túnir), since the first church was built there. The name is the plural form of tún n 'fenced areas; country courtyards' (cognate to English "town").

== Other sources ==
- Dag Jukvam / Statistics Norway (1999). "Historisk oversikt over endringer i kommune- og fylkesinndelingen" (in Norwegian).
