= Sellebakk =

Community in Fredrikstad, Norway

Coordinates: 59°13′47″N 10°59′41″E

Sellebakk is a community in the town of Fredrikstad in Norway. It is located in the former municipality Borge, on the eastern bank of Glomma. Lisleby is located to the west.

Sellebakk is also sometimes written as Selbak. The local sports team is Selbak TIF.
