= Solbergfoss =

Village in Østfold, Norway

Coordinates: 59°38′N 11°12′E

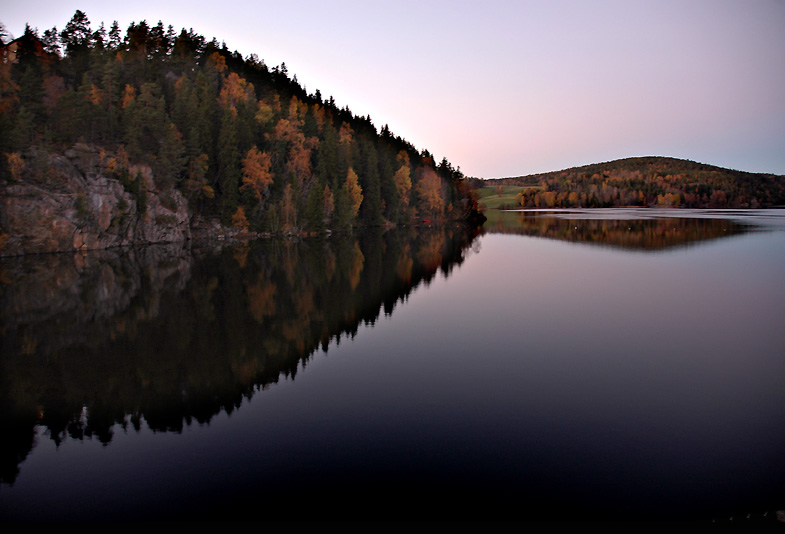
Glomma river at Solbergfoss

Solbergfoss is a small village in Askim municipality, Norway. Located a few miles north of the town Askim on the east bank of the Glomma river, Solbergfoss has a power plant which was built in 1924. In 1918 a railway line, Askim–Solbergfosslinjen, from Askim to Solbergfoss was built.
