= Eidsberg =

Eidsberg Municipality Eidsberg kommune
- Former municipality
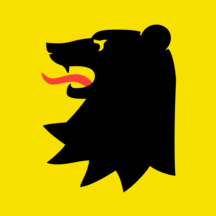
- Flag Coat of arms

- Østfold within Norway

- Eidsberg within Østfold
- Coordinates: 59°32′13″N 11°21′37″E
- Country: Norway
- County: Østfold
- District: Smaalenene
- Administrative centre: Mysen

Government
  - Mayor (2003): Knut Jørgen Herland (Sp)

Area (upon dissolution)
  - Total: 236 km^{2} (91 sq mi)
  - Land: 229 km^{2} (88 sq mi)
  - Rank: #311 in Norway

Population (2004)
  - Total: 10,121
  - Rank: #100 in Norway
  - Density: 44/km^{2} (110/sq mi)
  - Change (10 years): ▲ +10.5%
- Demonym: Eidsberging

Official language
  - Norwegian form: Bokmål
- Time zone: UTC+01:00 (CET)
  - Summer (DST): UTC+02:00 (CEST)
- ISO 3166 code: NO-0125
- Website: Official website

Eidsberg was a municipality in Østfold county, Norway. The administrative centre of the municipality was the town of Mysen. In 2020, Eidsberg was absorbed into the Indre Østfold municipality.

Eidsberg was established as a municipality on 1 January 1838 (see formannskapsdistrikt). The town of Mysen was separated from Eidsberg to form a municipality of its own on 1 July 1920, but it was merged back into the municipality of Eidsberg on 1 January 1961.

== General information ==
=== Name ===
The municipality (originally the parish) was named after the old Eidsberg farm (Old Norse: Eiðsberg) because the first church was built here. The first element is the genitive case of eið 'path around a waterfall' and the last element is berg 'mountain'. Prior to 1847, the name was spelled Edsberg.

=== Coat-of-arms ===
The coat-of-arms was from modern times. It was granted on 16 March 1962. The arms show a bear, which is taken as a symbol for Arnbjørn Jonsson, who lived in Eidsberg. The bear is canting for Bjørn (Norwegian: bear). He was a well-known warrior during the civil war era under King Håkon Håkonsson, until his death in 1240.

== Minorities ==
Number of minorities (1st and 2nd generation) in Eidsberg by country of origin in 2017
Ancestry	Number
Poland	398
Iraq	178
Lithuania	140
Bosnia-Herzegovina	99
Sweden	81
Kosovo	65
Russia	58
Somalia	47
Pakistan	40
Denmark	36
