= Hafslund =

Borough of Sarpsborg, Norway

Coordinates: 59°17′08″N 11°08′37″E

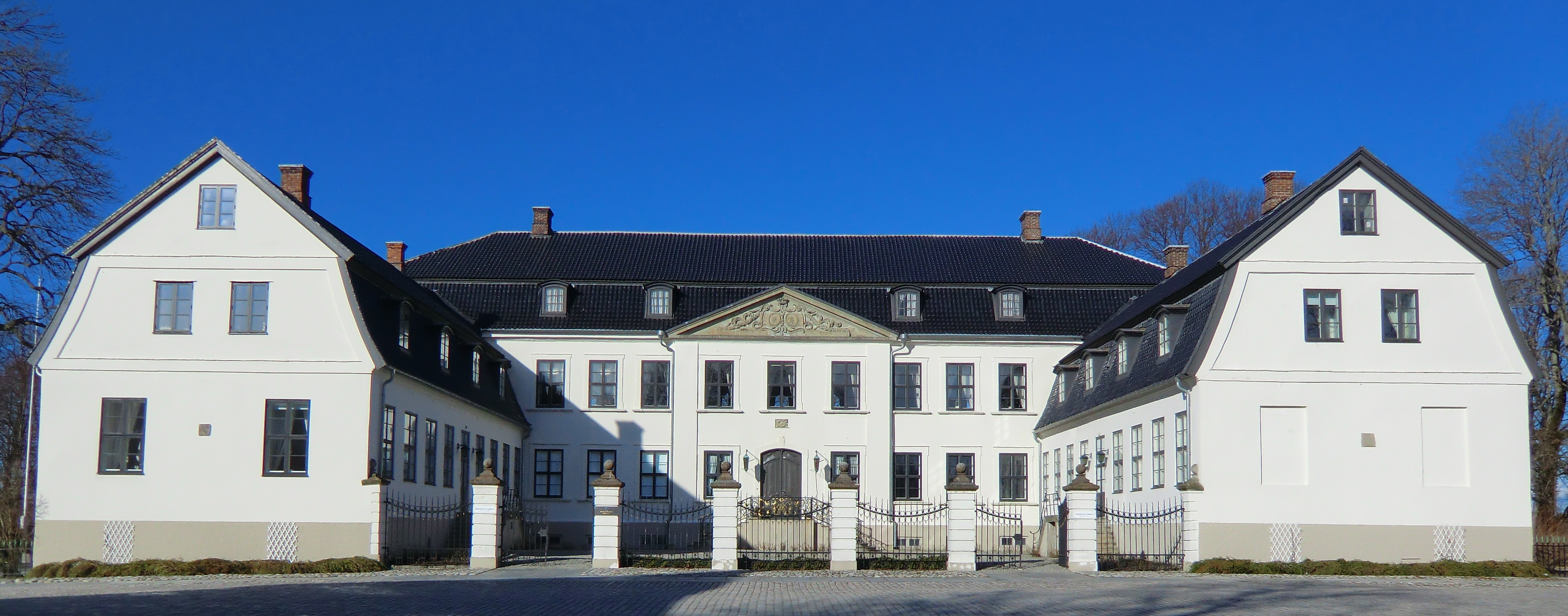
Hafslund Manor

Hafslund is a borough located east of the city centre in the city of Sarpsborg, Norway,

Before 1992, Hafslund was a part of Skjeberg municipality. The name Hafslund derives from Hafr, the Old Norse name for husband, and lundr, meaning grove. There has been a permanent settlement at Hafslund for over 5000 years.

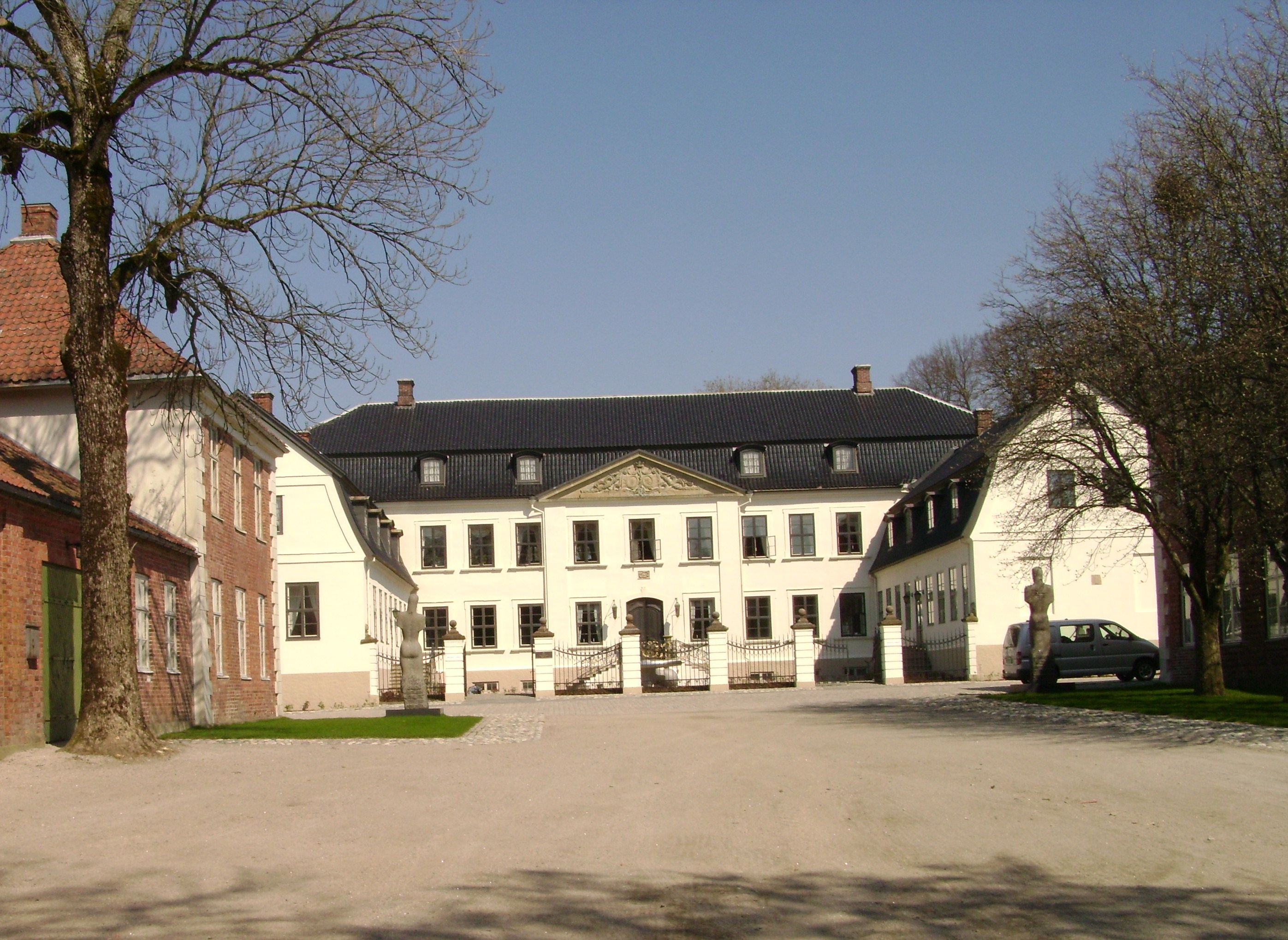
Hafslund Manor in 2010

== Hafslund Manor ==
Hafslund Manor (Hafslund Hovedgård) is an estate located just outside Hafslund. At various times, it was owned by the industrialist and timber merchant Benjamin Wegner, and by Maren Juel, who was regarded during her lifetime as the wealthiest woman in Norway. The property now covers approximately 6,000 acres (2,400 ha), of which approximately a quarter is forested. About 2,000 acres (810 ha) is leased for residential and industrial land.

The first public record of Hafslund dates to 1344, at which time the farm was crown property. Hafslund Manor dates from 1761. The manor house is located at the old Sandesund ferry site. It was built after an earlier Baroque building burned down in the autumn of 1757, and has well-preserved buildings and interiors. The main buildings were restored in 1937 and it is now a protected monument. It is owned by the industrial group Hafslund ASA, with the main building used for its meetings.
