= Lervik =

Village in Norway

Coordinates: 59.2719°N 10.7492°E

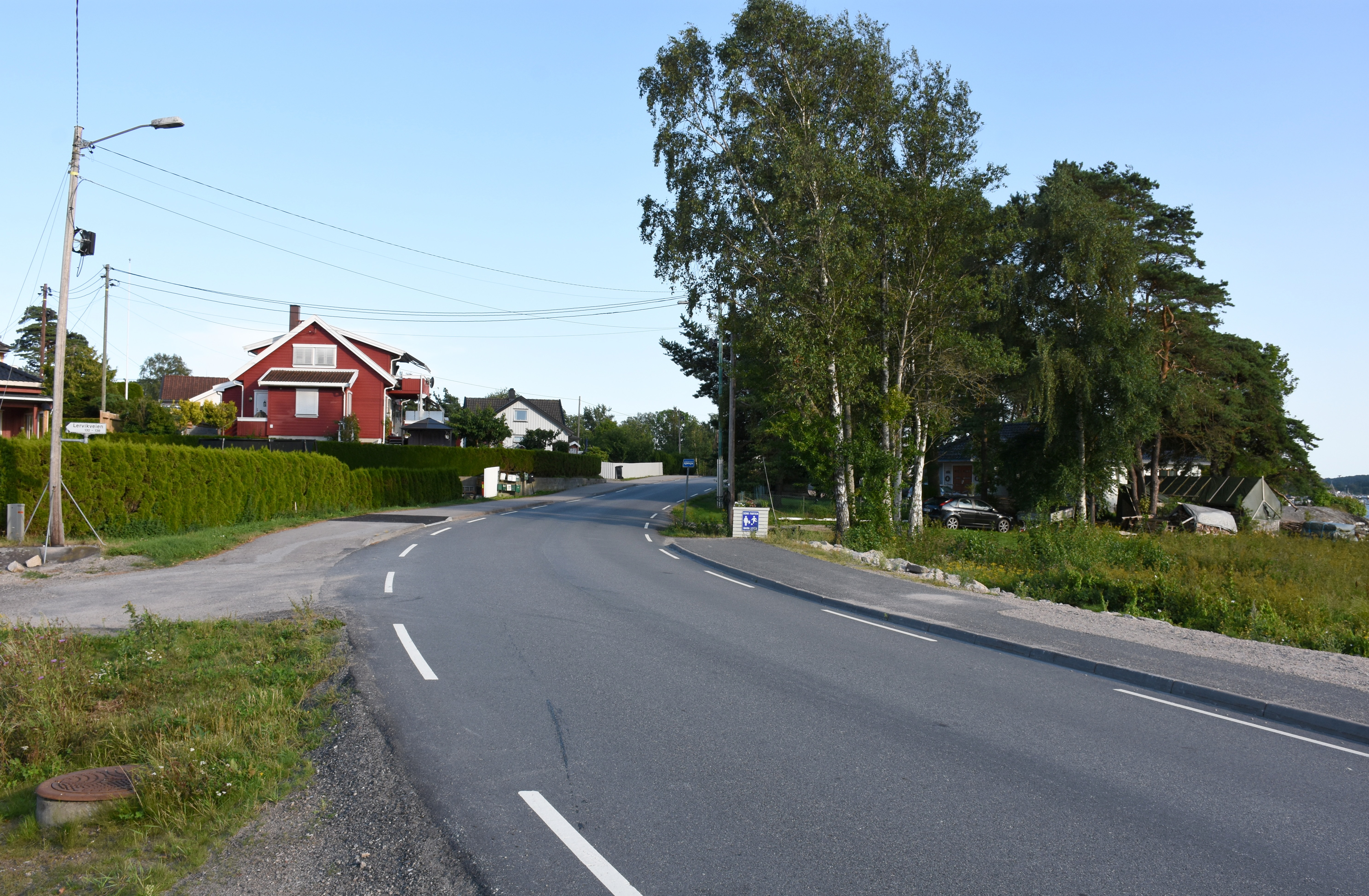
Lervik

Lervik is a village in the municipality of Fredrikstad, Norway, located by the Oslofjord. The population of Lervik is 2,393 (2008). In the summer, a lot of tourists comes to Lervik, mainly from Oslo and Bærum.
