= Skjønhaug =

Village in Østfold, Norway

Coordinates: 59°38′N 11°19′E

Skjønhaug is a village in the municipality of Trøgstad, Norway. Its official population, as of 2005, was 1,817.
