= Skjeberg =

District of Sarpsborg, Østfold County, Norway

Coordinates: 59°14′N 11°12′E

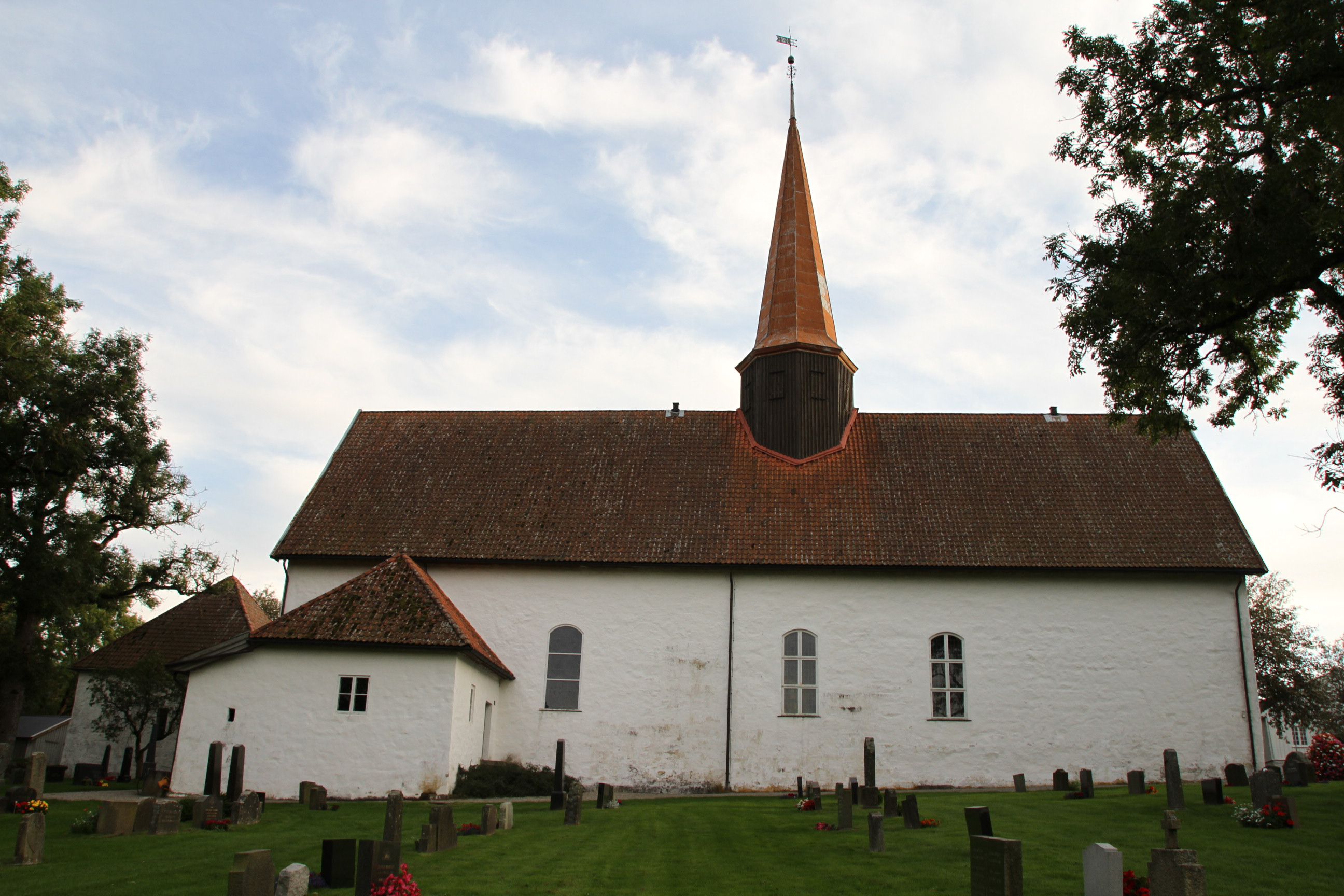
Skjeberg Church in Sarpsborg

Skjeberg is a district of Sarpsborg, Østfold County, Norway. Skjeberg was formerly a municipality in Østfold County. The last administrative centre was at Borgenhaugen. As of 2018, Skjeberg has a population of 1,397.

The parish of Skjeberg was established as a municipality on January 1, 1838 (see formannskapsdistrikt). The property, Hagelund, with 8 inhabitants was moved to the Halden municipality on January 1, 1968. The rural municipality of Skjeberg was (together with Tune and Varteig) merged with the city of Sarpsborg January 1, 1992. Prior to the merger, Skjeberg had a population of 14,295.

== Skjeberg Church ==
Skjeberg Church (Skjeberg Kirke) is located in what was until 1992, Skjeberg municipality, and now part of the municipality of Sarpsborg. The church is located approximately 7 km southeast of Sarpsborg and is the center of the parish of Skjeberg. The medieval church dates to the 1100s and was enlarged during the 1400s. Skjeberg church is built of stone in Romanesque style, but has a Gothic entrance hall. In the middle of the 17th century, the church received an octagonal rooftop. The oak pulpit is from 1623. The altar dates from approx. 1760.

== The name ==
The municipality (originally the parish) was named after the old farm of Skjeberg (Old Norse: *Skjalfberg), since the first church was built there. The first element is (probably) skjalf f 'shelf'; the last element is berg n 'rocky hill, mountain'.

== Notable people ==
- Gunnar Skar (1923–2012), actor and theater director
- Julius Fritzner (1828-1882), restaurateur and hotelier
