= Sarpsborg =

Sarpsborg Municipality Sarpsborg kommune
- Municipality
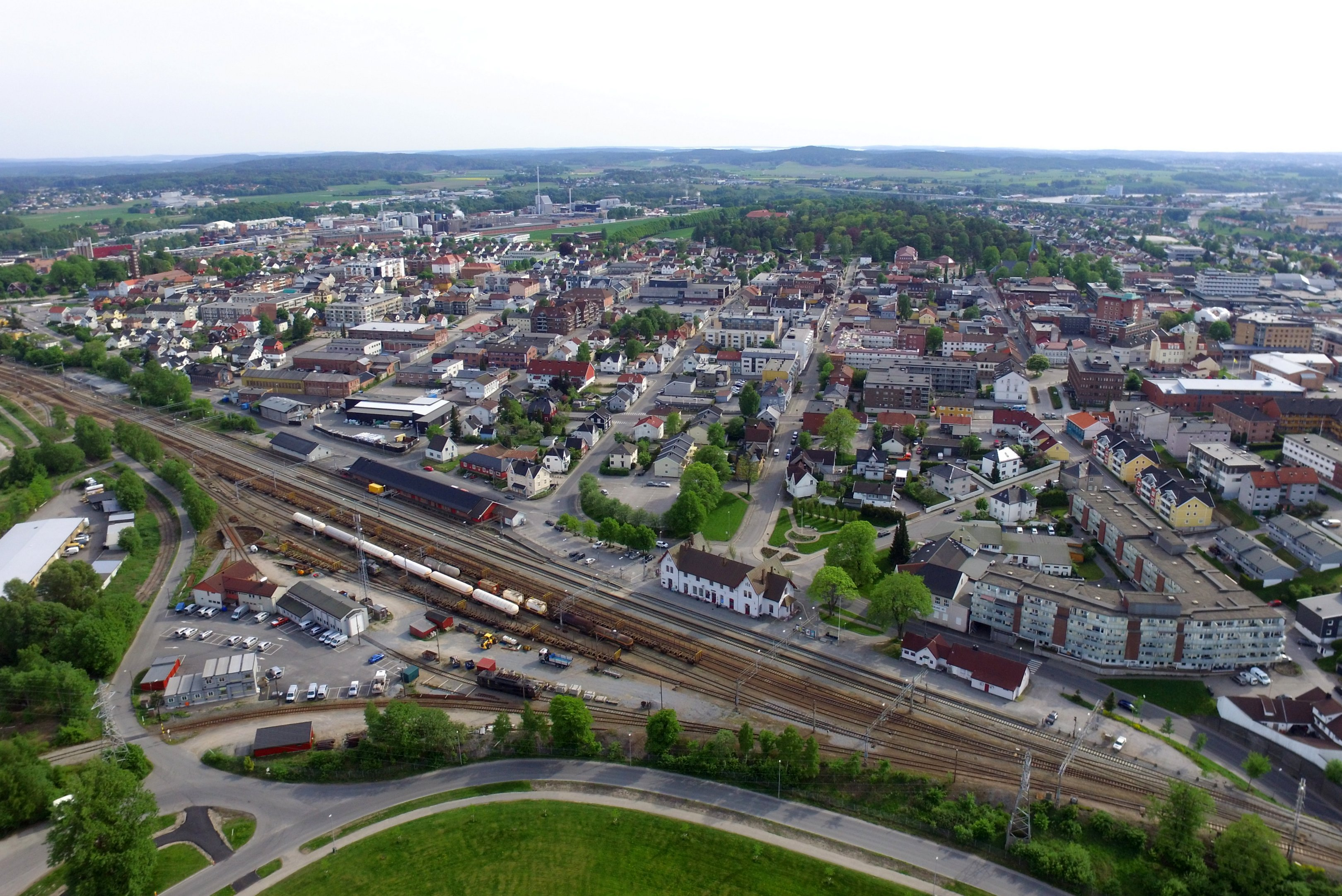
- Parts of Sarpsborg

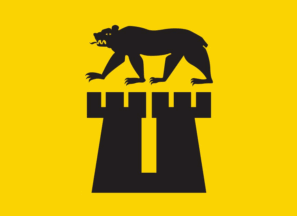
- Flag Coat of arms

- Østfold within Norway

- Sarpsborg within Østfold
- Coordinates: 59°17′09″N 11°06′43″E
- Country: Norway
- County: Østfold
- Administrative centre: Sarpsborg

Government
  - Mayor (2023): Magnus Arnesen (H)

Area
  - Total: 406 km^{2} (157 sq mi)
  - Land: 370 km^{2} (140 sq mi)
  - Rank: #238 in Norway

Population (31 December 2022)
  - Total: 59,038▲
  - Rank: #13 in Norway
  - Density: 134/km^{2} (350/sq mi)
  - Change (10 years): ▲ +6.6%

Official language
  - Norwegian form: Bokmål
- Time zone: UTC+01:00 (CET)
  - Summer (DST): UTC+02:00 (CEST)
- ISO 3166 code: NO-3105
- Website: Official website

Sarpsborg, historically Borg, is a city and municipality in the Østfold county of Eastern Norway. The administrative centre of the municipality is the city of Sarpsborg.

Sarpsborg is part of the fifth largest urban area in Norway when paired with neighbouring Fredrikstad. As of 1 January 2018, according to Statistics Norway these two municipalities have a total population of 136,127 with 55,840 in Sarpsborg and 81,278 in Fredrikstad.

Statistics for 2021, say that the city has a population where 19% of the children belong to families that have "low-income in the long-term"; that is the highest level for a city (in Norway); the national level is 11.3%.

== General information ==
=== Name ===
In Norse times the city was just called Borg (from borg which means "castle"). The background for this was the fortification built by Olav Haraldsson (see History section). Later, the genitive case of the name of the waterfall Sarpr (Sarp Falls) was added. It is unclear how Sarpsborg received this part of its name, though two interpretations are the most prevalent. The first comes from the Icelandic word Sarpr which means birdcage in English. The other interpretation is that Sarpr means "the one who swallows", probably referring to the local waterfall.

In Norse times Østfold county was called Borgarsýsla which means "the county (sýsla) of Borg" and the law district of southeast Norway was called Borgarþing meaning "the thing/court of Borg".

The old name has been revived in the diocese of Borg (1968) and Borgarting Court of Appeal (1995).

=== Coat of arms ===
The coat-of-arms is from modern times and was granted on 13 November 1991. It is based on a coat of arms dating from 1556 and shows a bear above a castle. The bear was introduced as early as some time in the 13th century, by the earl of Sarpsborg (Comes de Saresburgh), Alv Erlingsson. He used the bear to symbolise his strength. The castle symbolises the fortress (borg) that gave the city its original name.

== History ==
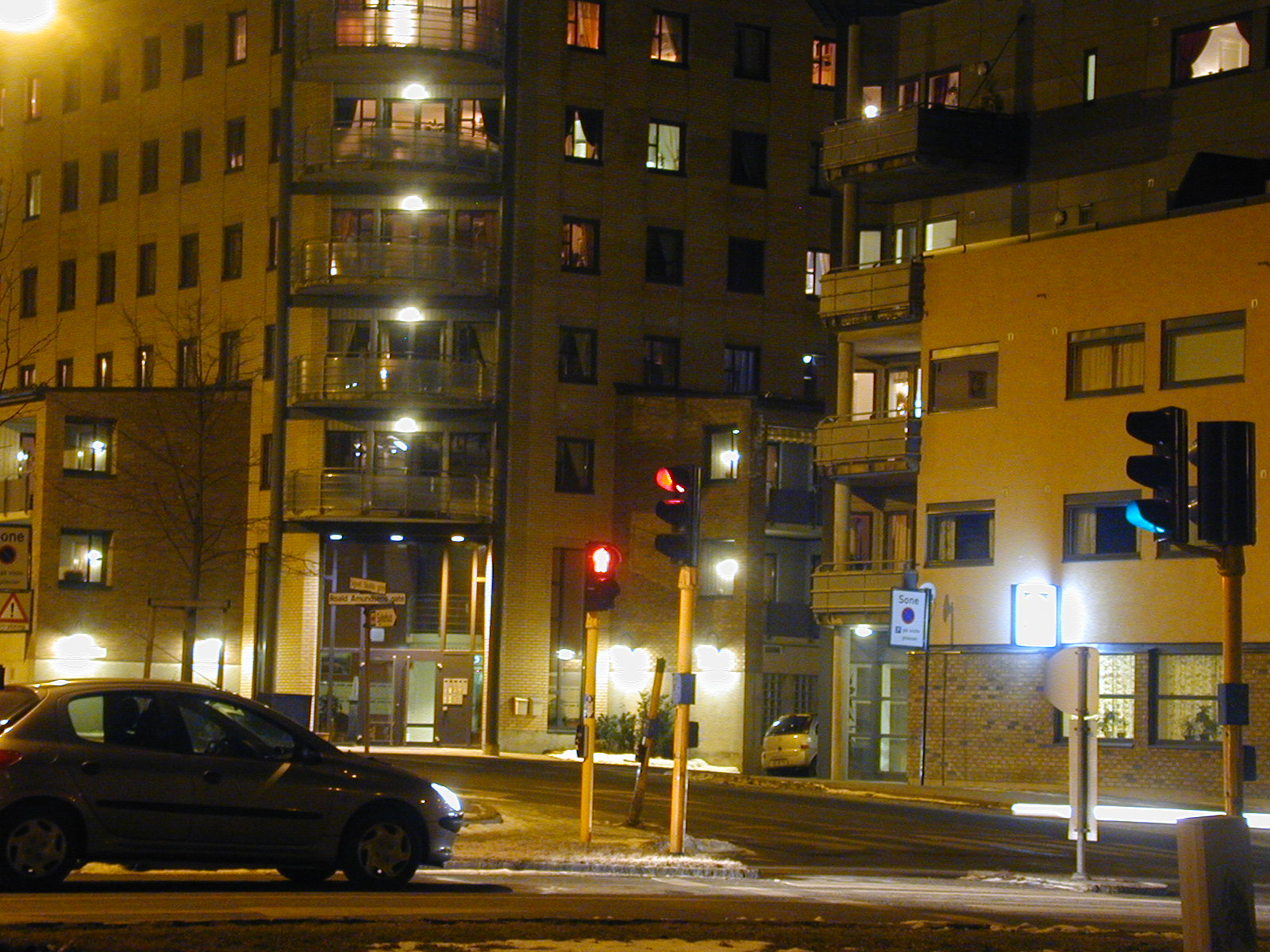
Downtown Sarpsborg (Roald Amundsens Gate)

The city was founded as Borg by the Viking King Olav Haraldsson (Saint Olaf) in 1016. It was burned to the ground by Swedish invaders in 1567 during the Northern Seven Years' War. Half the population was evacuated down the river to what is today known as Fredrikstad, about 15 kilometres (9 mi) downstream.

Much of the rebuilt town disappeared into the river Glomma during a 1702 mudslide. Again Borg was rebuilt, and it was recreated as a city in 1839, and separated from Tune as a municipality of its own.

The rural municipalities of Tune, Skjeberg, and Varteig were merged with the city on 1 January 1992. The population is steadily growing, and during the summer of 2005 it reached 50,000 inhabitants.

In 2016 the town celebrated its 1,000th anniversary, and the entire year was commemorated by a special programme that encouraged historic preservation within the town.

Historically, the sawmill and timber shipping industry has been Sarpsborg's most important sources of income, however since the industrialisation in Norway, more specifically Sarpsborg and the establishment of local manufacturing businesses during the late 1800s, the biggest being Borregaard, Sarpsborg has changed from its traditional timber-based economy and pre-industrial society to a more manufacturing and refining-based economy and industrial society. In modern times Sarpsborg has moved away from being a city based on the local manufacturing and refining industry, with only around ten percent employed within the local manufacturing industry, coinciding with Norway's general shift towards a post-industrial society. Despite this, the city is still widely regarded by Norwegians both unofficially and officially, to be an industrial city.

Number of minorities (1st and 2nd generation) in Sarpsborg by country of origin in 2021
Ancestry	Number
Poland	1,646
Iraq	1,382
Bosnia-Herzegovina	1,102
Kosovo	841
Somalia	725
Syria	557
Sweden	492
Afghanistan	408
Iran	372
Vietnam	297
Lithuania	267
Philippines	260
Thailand	240
Serbia	178
Pakistan	174
Denmark	161
Russia	160

== Economy ==
Borregaard Industries is, and always has been, the most important industry in the city. The city is also the home of Borg Bryggerier, part of the Hansa Borg Bryggerier, which is Norway's second largest brewery-group.

== City districts ==
- Alvim
- Borgenhaugen
- Brevik
- Fritznerbakken
- Gleng
- Greåker
- Grålum
- Hafslund
- Hafslundsøy
- Hannestad
- Hasle
- Høysand
- Ise
- Klavestadhaugen
- Kurland
- Lande
- Opsund
- Sandbakken
- Sannesund
- Sarpsborg
- Skjeberg
- Valaskjold
- Varteig
- Yven

== Sport ==
During the 1950s and 1960s, Sarpsborg was famous for its football (soccer) team, Sarpsborg FK, but is now more known for its ice hockey team, Sparta Warriors. In football, Sarpsborg 08 FF has taken over the local throne, currently playing at the highest national level. On 6 November 2009, they sent arch-rival FFK down from the top division in a play-off game in Fredrikstad stadion. Sarpsborg 08 has a women's football team that was promoted to the women's Division 1 at the end of 2011, at the same time as the club's under-19 girls reached the Junior Cup Final. Sarpsborg BK plays in the highest bandy division.

Sarpsborg is famous for its two elite leagues teams in floorball, Sarpsborg IBK and Greåker IBK.

== Transport ==
The city does not have its own airport. The nearest airports are Sandefjord Airport which is located 80 km (50 mi) and Oslo Airport which is located 137 km (85 mi) away from Sarpsborg.

== Climate ==
Sarpsborg has a humid continental climate (Dfb) or temperate oceanic climate (Cfb), depending on winter threshold used (0 °C (32 °F) or −3 °C (27 °F)). The all-time high 33.5 °C (92.3 °F) was recorded in July 2018. The all-time low −26 °C (−15 °F) was set in December 2002. Since the weather station was incepted in 1991, the records may not be representative of a longer time frame. The average date for the last overnight freeze (low below 0 °C (32.0 °F)) in spring is 20 April and average date for first freeze in autumn is 22 October giving a frost-free season of 184 days (1981-2010 average).

Climate data for Sarpsborg 1991-2020 (57 m, extremes since 1991)
Month	Jan	Feb	Mar	Apr	May	Jun	Jul	Aug	Sep	Oct	Nov	Dec	Year
Record high °C (°F)	10.5 (50.9)	11.4 (52.5)	21.4 (70.5)	27 (81)	30 (86)	31.5 (88.7)	33.5 (92.3)	30.4 (86.7)	27.5 (81.5)	18.8 (65.8)	16.0 (60.8)	12.5 (54.5)	33.5 (92.3)
Mean daily maximum °C (°F)	1.2 (34.2)	1.5 (34.7)	5.3 (41.5)	11 (52)	16.4 (61.5)	20 (68)	22 (72)	20.9 (69.6)	16.4 (61.5)	10.4 (50.7)	5.7 (42.3)	2.4 (36.3)	11.1 (52.0)
Daily mean °C (°F)	−1.4 (29.5)	−1.5 (29.3)	0.9 (33.6)	5.8 (42.4)	11.1 (52.0)	14.9 (58.8)	17.4 (63.3)	16.5 (61.7)	12.2 (54.0)	7 (45)	3.1 (37.6)	−0.1 (31.8)	7.2 (44.9)
Mean daily minimum °C (°F)	−3.7 (25.3)	−3.9 (25.0)	−1.8 (28.8)	2.4 (36.3)	7.2 (45.0)	11.3 (52.3)	13.8 (56.8)	13.1 (55.6)	9.4 (48.9)	5 (41)	1.2 (34.2)	−2.5 (27.5)	4.3 (39.7)
Record low °C (°F)	−23.3 (−9.9)	−23 (−9)	−21.1 (−6.0)	−6 (21)	−2.6 (27.3)	2 (36)	7 (45)	5.2 (41.4)	−1 (30)	−8.5 (16.7)	−12.5 (9.5)	−26 (−15)	−26 (−15)
Average precipitation mm (inches)	72.4 (2.85)	50.6 (1.99)	48.8 (1.92)	50.3 (1.98)	55.2 (2.17)	71.2 (2.80)	69.5 (2.74)	92.8 (3.65)	85.4 (3.36)	107.5 (4.23)	100.8 (3.97)	87.5 (3.44)	892 (35.1)
Source 1: NOAA
Source 2: eklima/met.no

== Musical artists and bands ==
- Apoptygma Berzerk
- Artch
- Jan Groth
- Patrik Svendsen
- Ragnarok
- Robert Normann
- Tonic Breed

== Notable residents ==
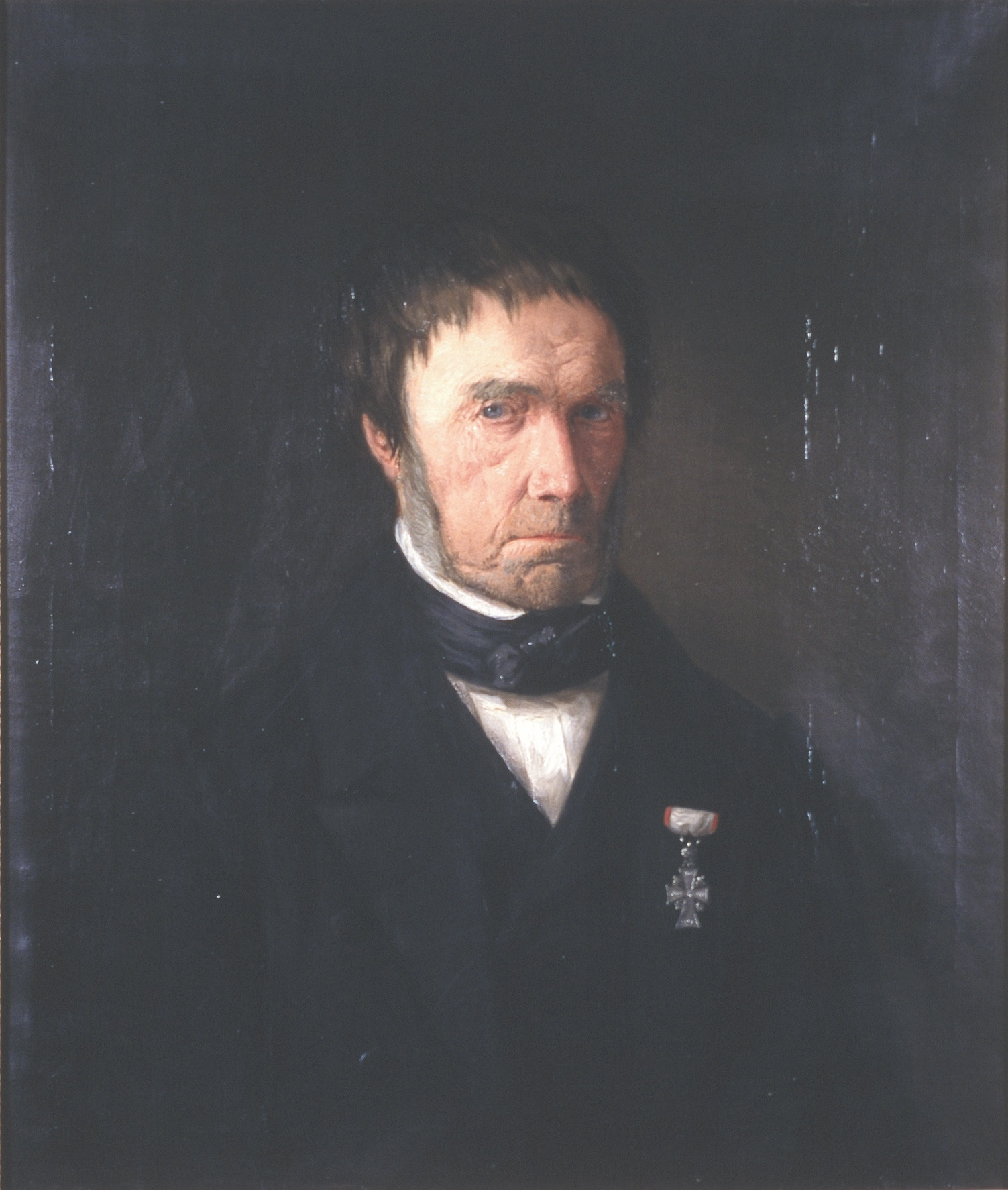
Zacharias Mellebye, 1854

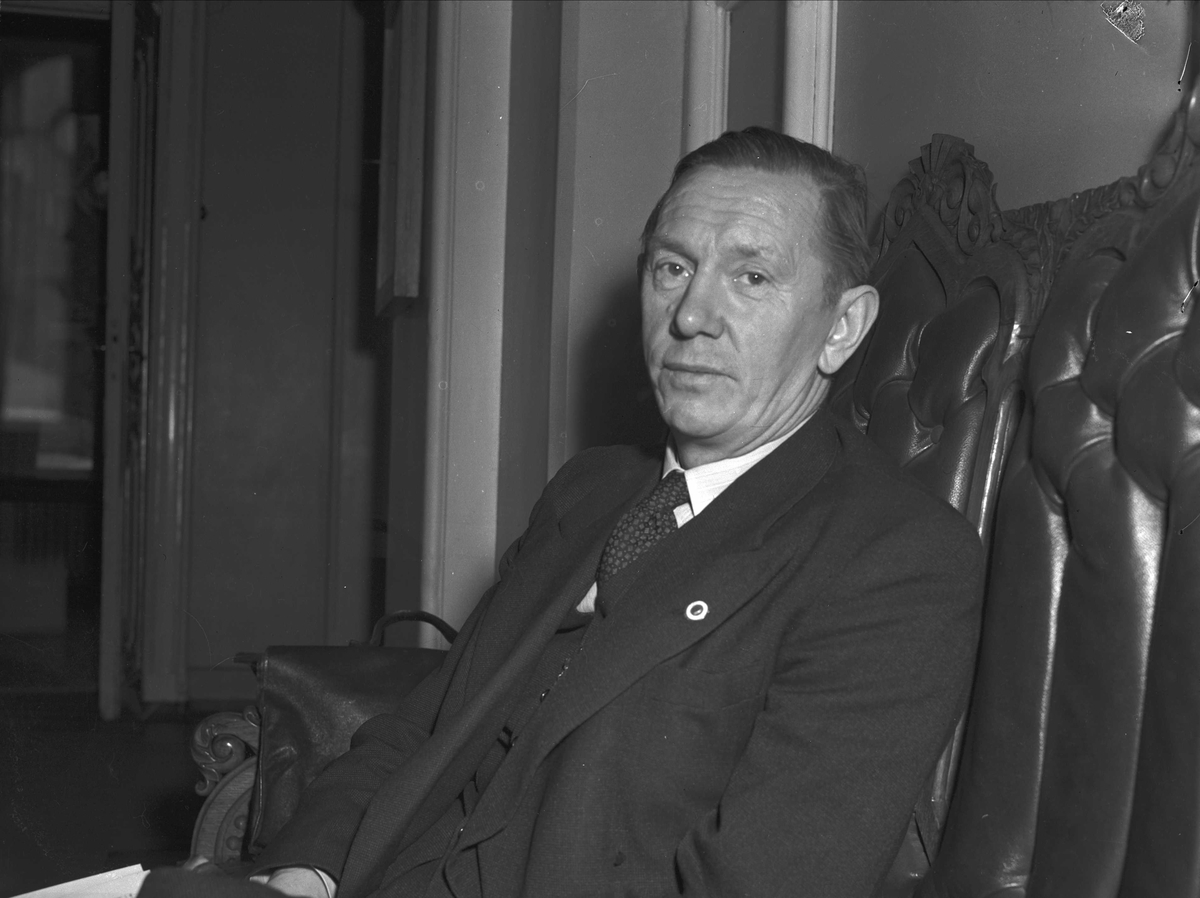
Oscar Torp, 1950

=== Public service ===
- Zacharias Mellebye (1781 in Skjeberg – 1854) farmer, military officer and rep. at the Norwegian Constituent Assembly
- Harald Dahl (1863–1920), father of the British writer Roald Dahl came from Sarpsborg
- Roald Amundsen (1872-1928) explorer, first person to reach the South Pole, came from Borge
- Oscar Torp (1893 in Skjeberg – 1958) former Prime Minister of Norway, 1951-1955
- Carl Fredrik Wisløff (1908–2004) theologian and Christian preacher, grew up in Sarpsborg
- Øistein Strømnæs (1914 in Sarpsborg – 1980) head of XU, the WWII intelligence organization
- Torbjørn Sikkeland (1923 in Varteig – 2014) chemist, nuclear physicist and radiation biophysicist
- Thorvald Gressum (1932–2008) a politician and Mayor of Sarpsborg 1984 to 1995
- Kai Eide (born 1949 in Sarpsborg) a diplomat and writer; roles with the United Nations
- Erik Varden (born 1974), a Roman Catholic spiritual writer and Bishop-Prelate of Trondheim

=== The Arts ===
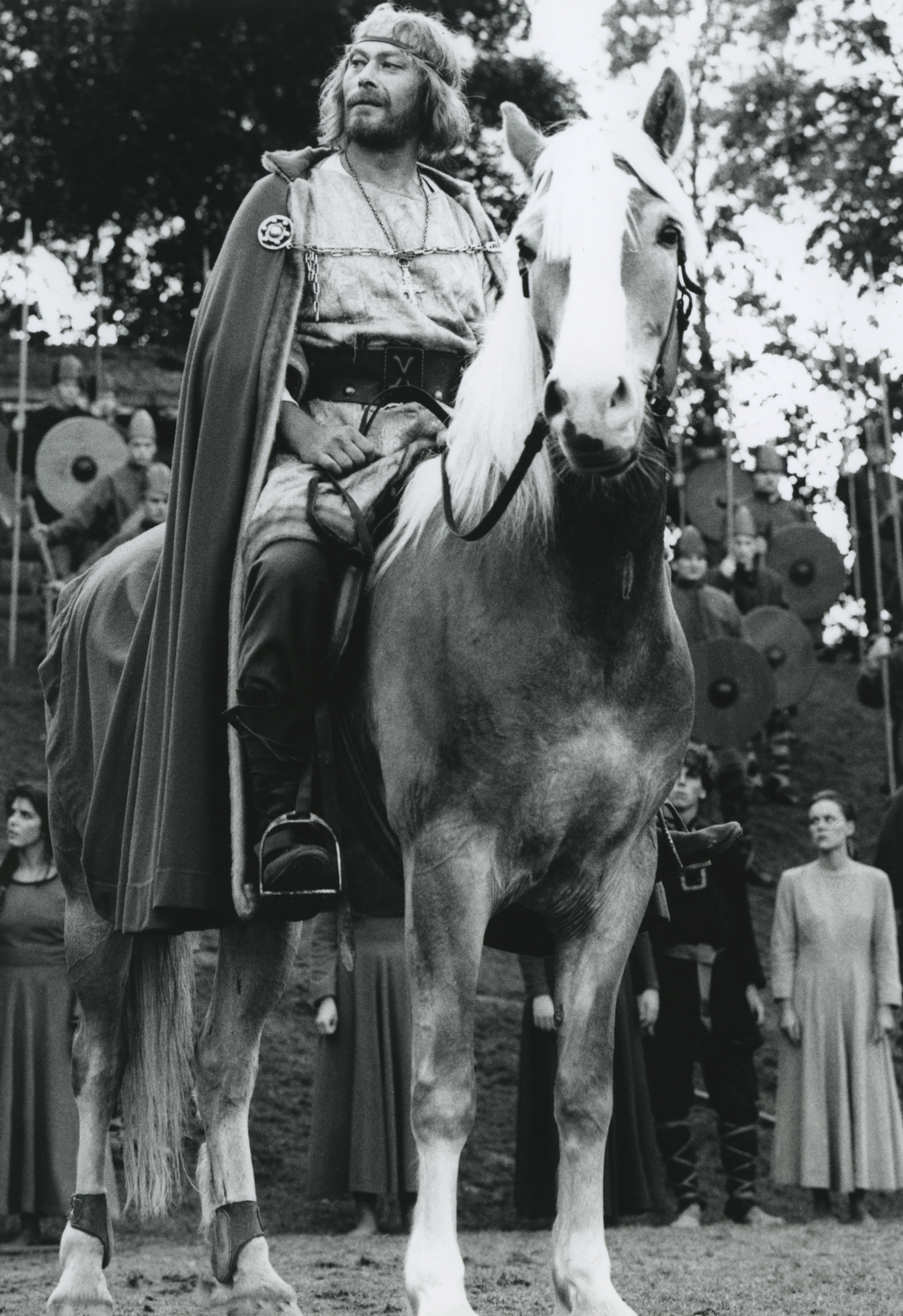
Nils Ole Oftebro, as King Olaf II, 1992

- Julius Fritzner (1828 in Skjeberg – 1882) a restaurateur and hotelier in Christiania
- Bjarne Bø (1907 in Skjeberg – 1998) a Norwegian actor
- Arne Arnardo, (1912 in Sarpsborg – 1995) circus performer and owner, "Circus King of Norway"
- Walther Aas, (Norwegian Wiki) (1928–1990), neo-romantic artist; lived in Sarpsborg from 1954
- Kjell Karlsen (1931 in Sarpsborg – 2020) band leader, composer, jazz pianist and organist
- Nils Ole Oftebro (born 1944 in Sarpsborg) a Norwegian actor and illustrator
- Jan Groth (born 1946 in Greåker) vocalist, songwriter, artist with Aunt Mary and other bands
- Ketil Gudim (born 1956 in Sarpsborg) a Norwegian dancer and actor
- Einstein Kristiansen (born 1965 in Greåker) a cartoonist, designer and TV-host
- Kåre Christoffer Vestrheim (born 1969 in Sarpsborg) record producer, musician and composer
- Stephan Groth (born 1971) musician with Apoptygma Berzerk; lived in Sarpsborg since 1986
- Ulrikke Brandstorp (born 1995 in Sarpsborg) singer, songwriter and musical actress

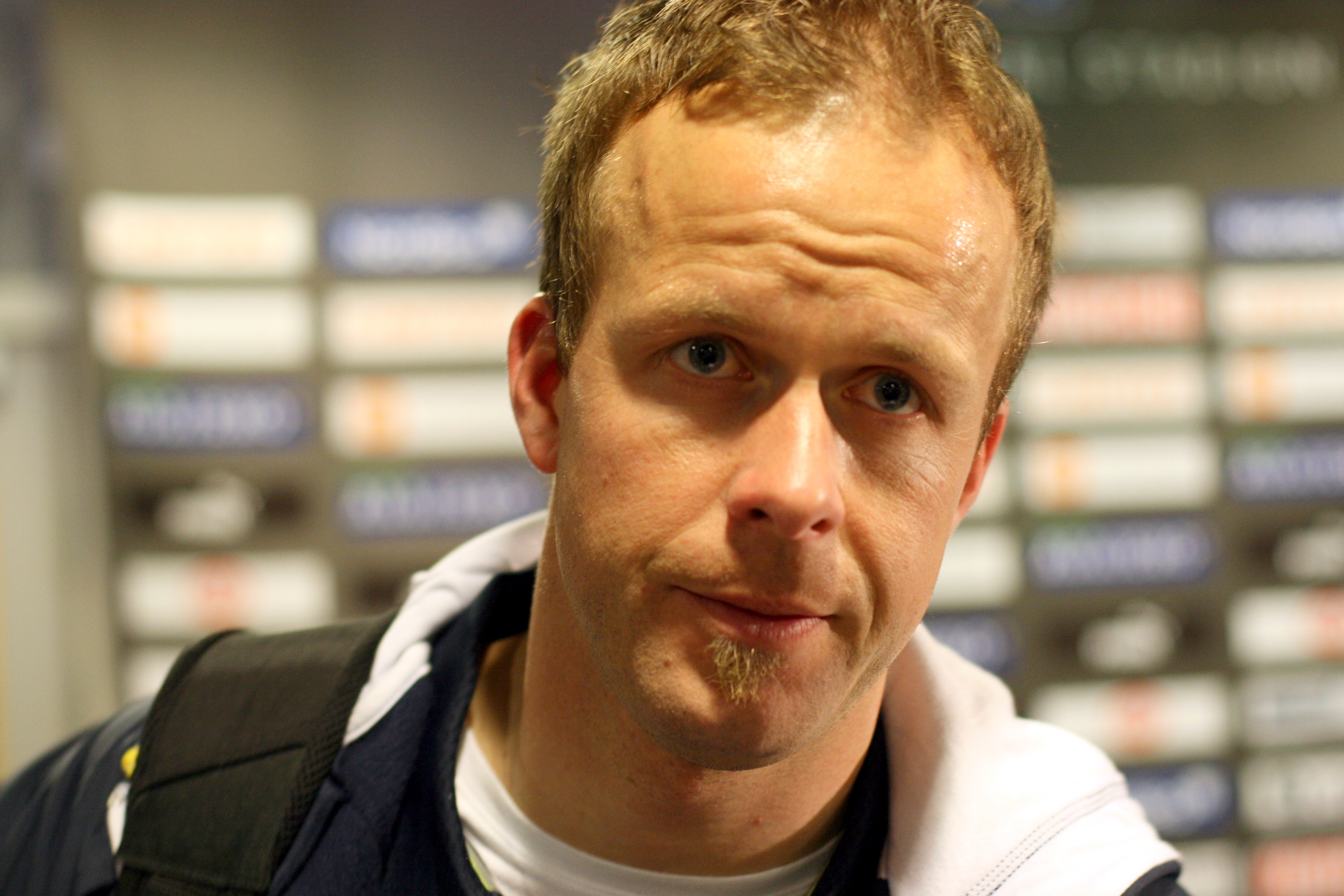
Thomas Myhre, 2009

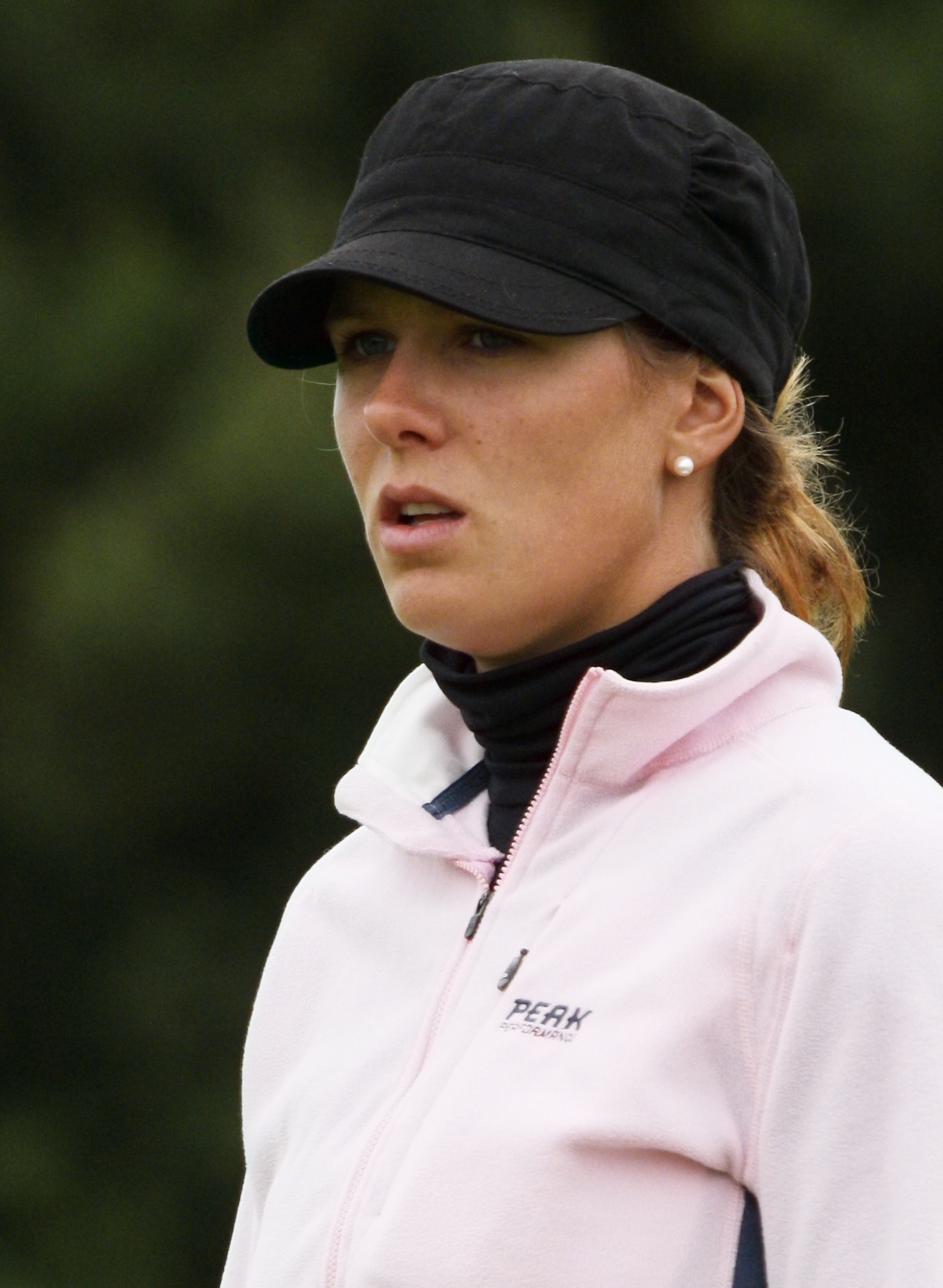
Marianne Skarpnord, 2009

=== Sport ===
- Therese Bertheau (1861 in Skjeberg – 1936) a pioneering female Norwegian mountaineer
- John Anderson (1873 in Sarpsborg – 1949) US Major League Baseball player for 15 seasons
- Bjørn Spydevold (1918 in Sarpsborg – 2002) a footballer with 37 caps for Norway
- Bent Skammelsrud (born 1966 in Sarpsborg) footballer, with 366 club caps, mainly for Rosenborg BK and 38 for Norway
- Thomas Myhre (born 1973 in Sarpsborg) goalkeeper with 346 club caps and 56 for Norway
- Raymond Kvisvik (born 1974 in Sarpsborg) footballer, with 425 club caps and 11 for Norway
- Jens Arne Svartedal (born 1976 in Sarpsborg), cross-country skier, team silver medallist at the 2006 Winter Olympics
- Per-Åge Skrøder (born 1978 in Sarpsborg), ice hockey player with men's national team
- Marianne Skarpnord (born 1986 in Sarpsborg) pro. golfer, plays on Ladies European Tour
- Jonas Holøs (born 1987 in Sarpsborg), ice hockey player with men's national team
- Marie Solberg (born 1988 in Sarpsborg) a sailor, bronze medallist at the 2012 Summer Paralympics
- Sander Skogli (born 1993 in Sarpsborg), ice hockey player
- Mohamed Elyounoussi (born in 1994), football player

== Twin towns - Sister cities ==
Sarpsborg has several sister cities:

Bethlehem, State of Palestine; Berwick-upon-Tweed, Northumberland, United Kingdom; Forssa, Kanta-Häme, Finland	Grand Forks, North Dakota, United States; Södertälje, Stockholm County, Sweden; Struer, Midtjylland, Denmark
