= Östra Ånneröd =

- Location within Västra Götaland Location within Sweden
- Coordinates: 58°57′40″N 11°10′40″E
- Country: Sweden
- Province: Västergötland
- County: Västra Götaland County
- Municipality: Strömstad Municipality

Area
  - Total: 0.11 km^{2} (0.042 sq mi)

Population (31 December 2010)
  - Total: 225
  - Density: 2,070/km^{2} (5,400/sq mi)
- Time zone: UTC+1 (CET)
  - Summer (DST): UTC+2 (CEST)

Östra Ånneröd (or simply Ånneröd) is a place in Strömstad Municipality, Västra Götaland County, Sweden with 225 inhabitants in 2010. Since 2015 it is considered a part of Strömstad for statistical purposes.
