= Ursholmen =

Island and lighthouse in Sweden

Ursholmen light station
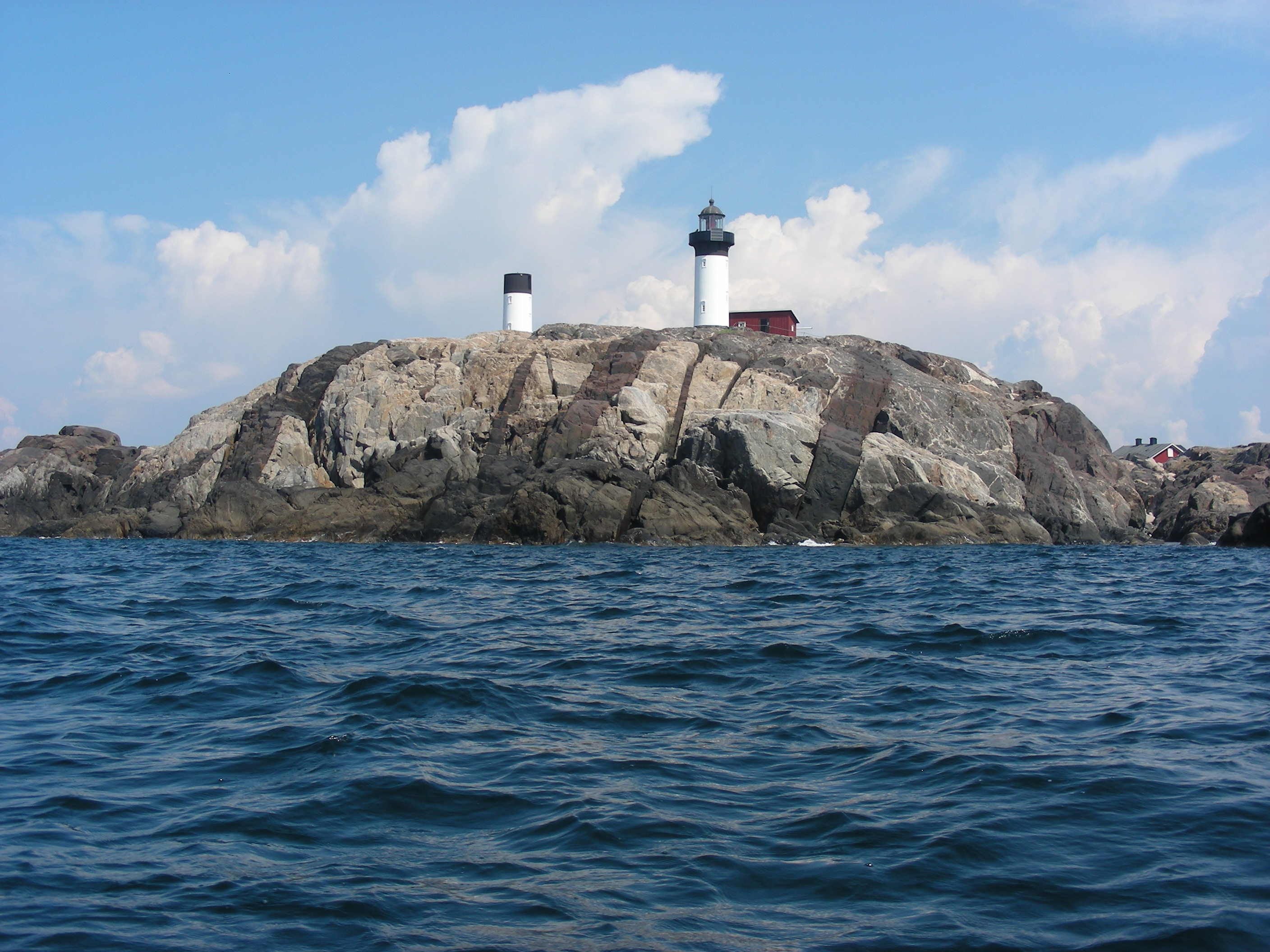
- Location: Kosteröarna (naturreservat), Strömstad Municipality, Sweden
- Coordinates: 58°49′57″N 10°59′24″E
- Constructed: 1890
- Construction: reinforced concrete
- Shape: cylindrical towers with balcony and lantern
- Operator: Stiftelsen Ursholmen

Light
- First lit: 13 November 1891
- Sweden no.: SV-8608
- Ursholmen southern lighthouse Ursholmen
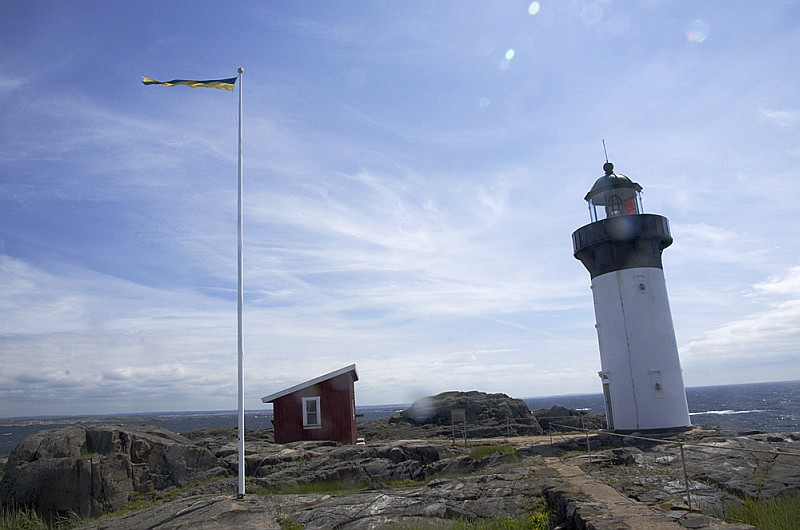
- Constructed: 1890
- Construction: reinforced concrete
- Automated: 1965
- Height: 13.5 m (44 ft)
- Markings: White (tower), black (stripe, lantern)
- Power source: kerosene, electricity
- First lit: 13 November 1891
- Focal height: 33 m (108 ft)
- Lens: third order Fresnel lens
- Range: 10 nmi (19 km; 12 mi) (white), 7.6 nmi (14.1 km; 8.7 mi) (red), 6.4 nmi (11.9 km; 7.4 mi) (green)
- Characteristic: LFl(2) WRG 15s (2000–)
- Ursholmen northen lighthouse
- Constructed: 1890
- Construction: reinforced concrete
- Height: 13 m (43 ft)
- Markings: White (tower), black (stripe, lantern)
- Power source: kerosene
- First lit: 13 November 1891
- Deactivated: 18 July 1931
- Focal height: 33 m (108 ft)
- Lens: third order Fresnel lens (–1932)
- Characteristic: Exting (1931–)

Ursholmen is a Swedish island and lighthouse located west of Strömstad town. It is the westernmost lighthouse in Sweden.

== History ==
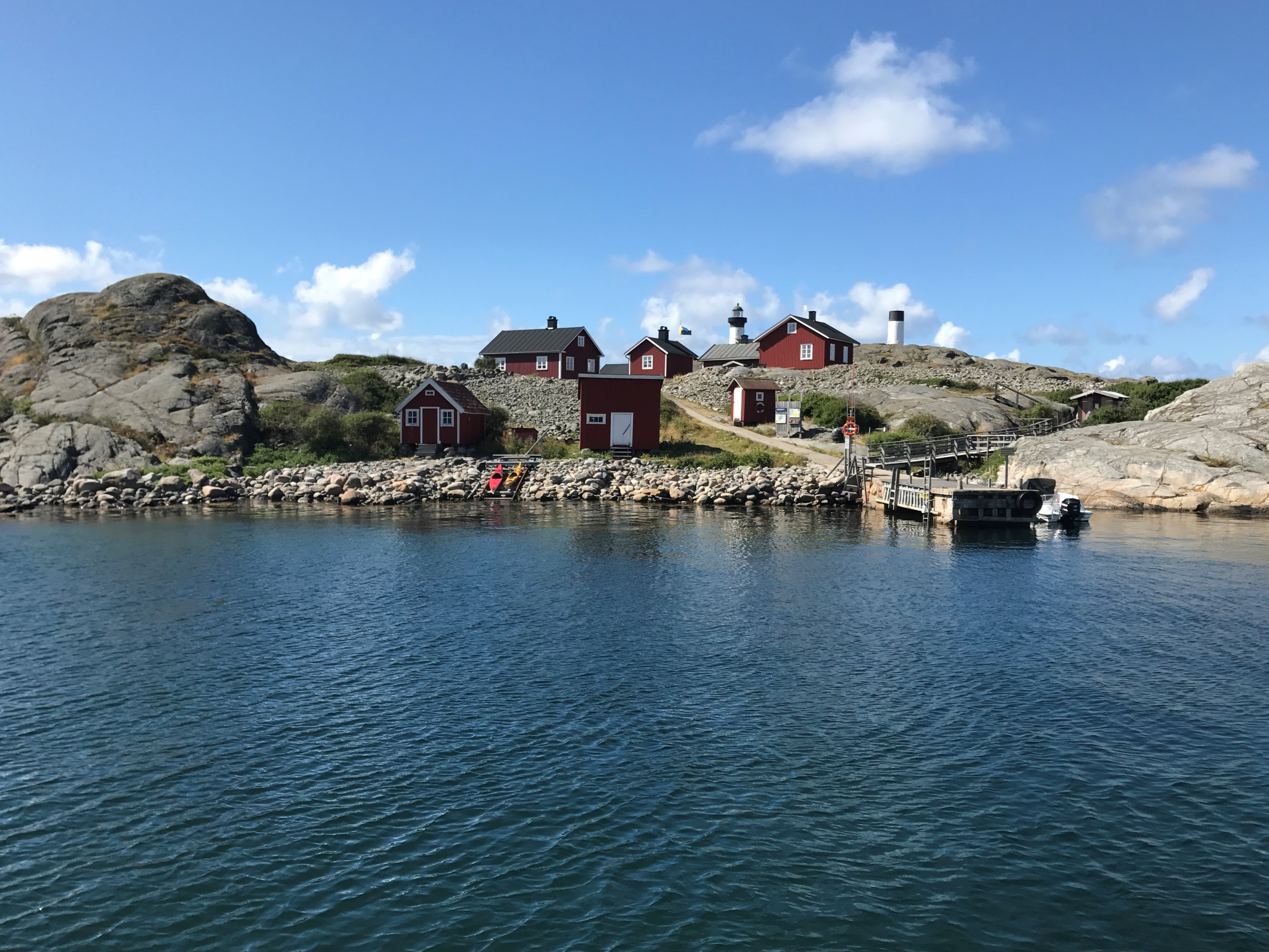
Houses for lightkeepers and their families. Lighthouse and former lighthouse in background.

In 1891 two identical lighthouses were built on the island to replace two lighthouses on Nordkoster. It was the first time in Sweden lighthouses were built in concrete. In 1931 the north tower was deactivated and its lantern room removed, but the tower remains. In 1965 the south tower was electrified and automated. In 2000 solar cells was installed and the electric cable removed. In 2008 the Swedish Maritime Administration handed ownership of the towers to the Naturvårdsverket which already owned all of the other buildings on the island. SMA didn't find the lighthouse important for the modern commercial shipping any more, but they paid an amount of money to Naturvårdsverket for restoration of the two towers.

There is a very small lighthouse museum in a cabin on the island. The whole island is a nature reserve, a part of Kosterhavet national park.

== See also ==
- List of lighthouses and lightvessels in Sweden
