= Kosterhavet National Park =

National park in Sweden

- Kosterhavets nationalpark
- IUCN category II (national park)
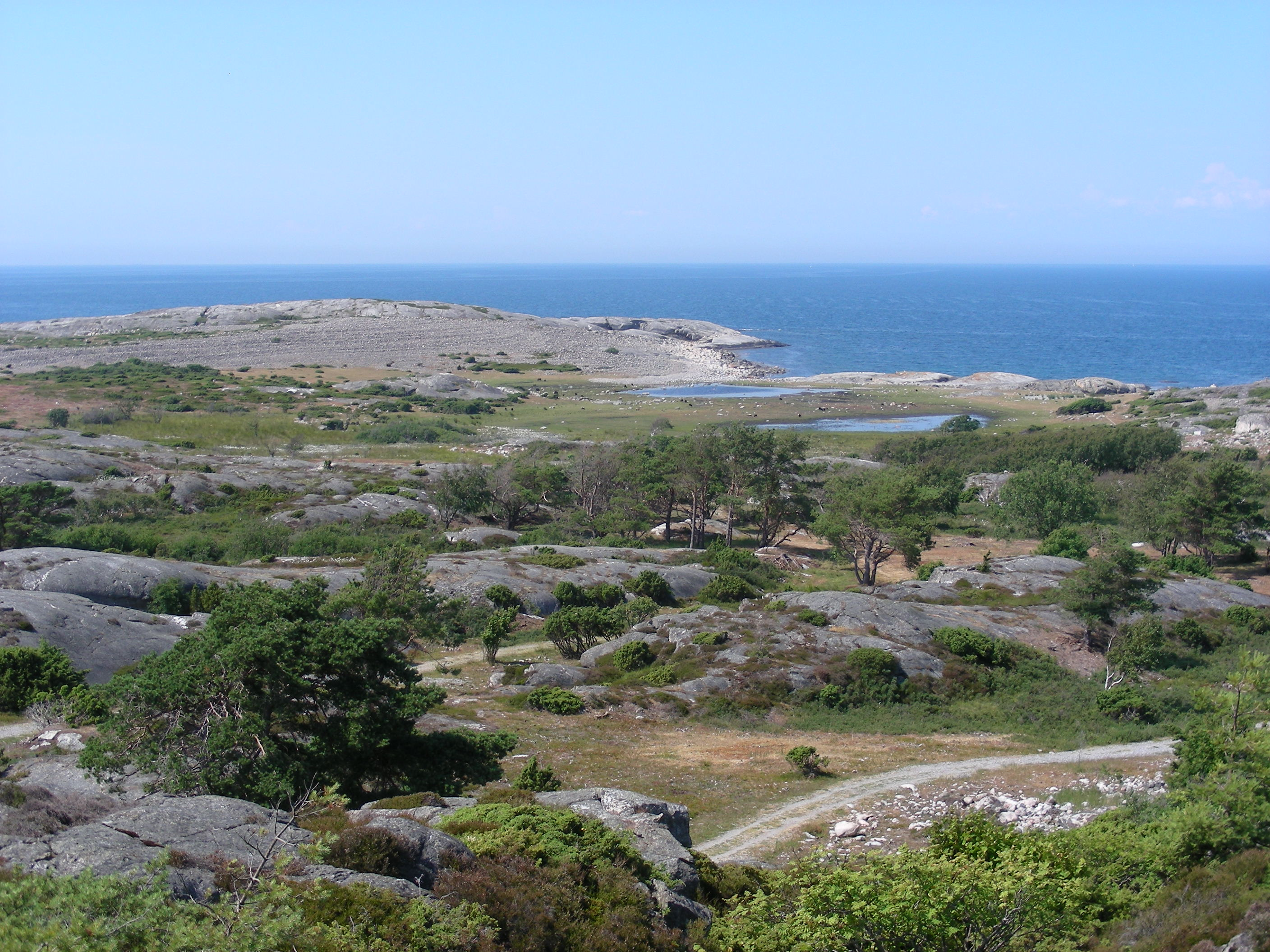
- Interactive map of Kosterhavet National Park
- Location: Bohuslän, Sweden
- Nearest city: Strömstad
- Coordinates: 58°50′N 11°01′E
- Area: 388.78 km^{2} (150.11 sq mi)
- Established: 2009
- Visitors: 90,000
- Governing body: Environmental Protection Agency
- Website: Official website

Kosterhavet National Park (Swedish: Kosterhavets nationalpark, literally The Koster Sea National Park) is the first national marine park in Sweden, inaugurated in September 2009. It is part of the Skagerrak sea and is located in Strömstad and Tanum municipalities in Bohuslän, Västra Götaland County, Sweden. It consists of the sea and shores around the Koster Islands, excluding everything else on the islands. In the north, it borders the Norwegian marine park of Ytre Hvaler.

The national park has five entrances, as well as an exhibit and patting acquarium. It covers 400 square km.

Kosterhavet National Park is home to Sweden's largest seal colony.

== Nature ==
National parks of Sweden (clickable map)

The environment in the park is unique to Swedish waters. Over 6,000 marine species have been identified, about 200 of them can not to be found elsewhere in Sweden.Brachiopod, sponge and coral larvae are brought in by currents from the Atlantic. Rare seabirds, such as Arctic terns and skuas, along with a large population of harbor seals have their habitat here. Plaice, cod and sea trout breed in the more shallow waters closer to the shore.

The Kosterfjord (English: Koster Fjord) is 200 m (660 ft) deep with relatively low temperature – 5 to 7 °C (41 to 45 °F) – and high salinity (about 35%). The trench has a maximum depth of 247m, and is home to many of the unique local species.

Professional fishing is allowed although special regulations apply. The waters of the park is significant for the fishing of northern prawn and Norwegian lobster. Fishing is not subject to environmental protection, and are instead regulated by fishery laws and an agreement from 2000.

== Gallery ==
Kosterhavet's logo

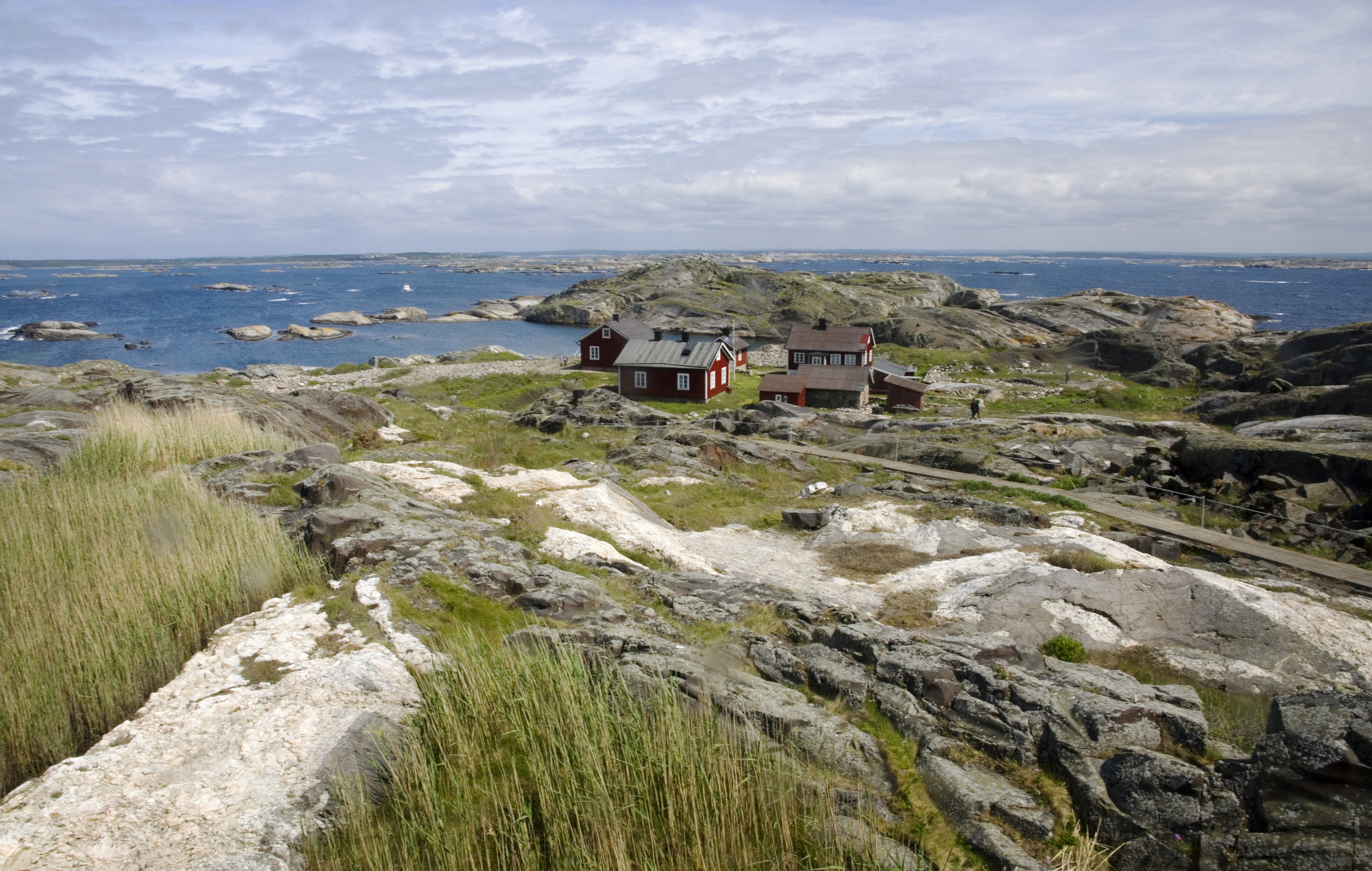
Kosterhavet National Park

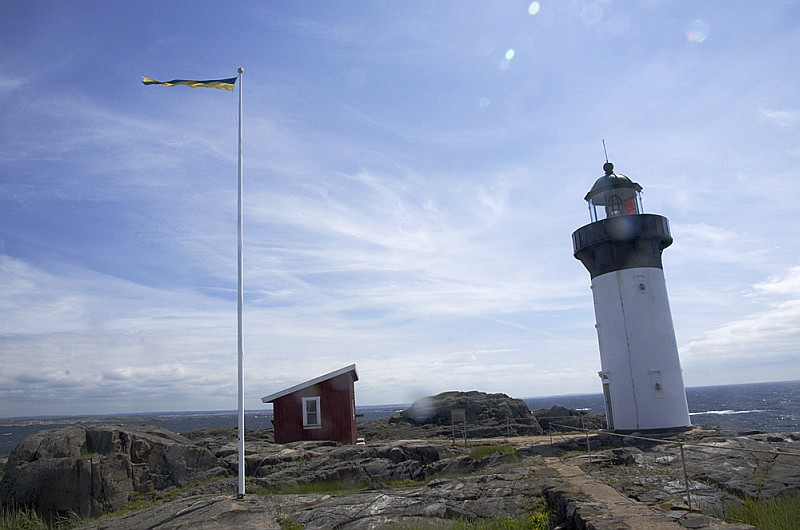
Kosterhavet National Park, lighthouse at Ursholmen island

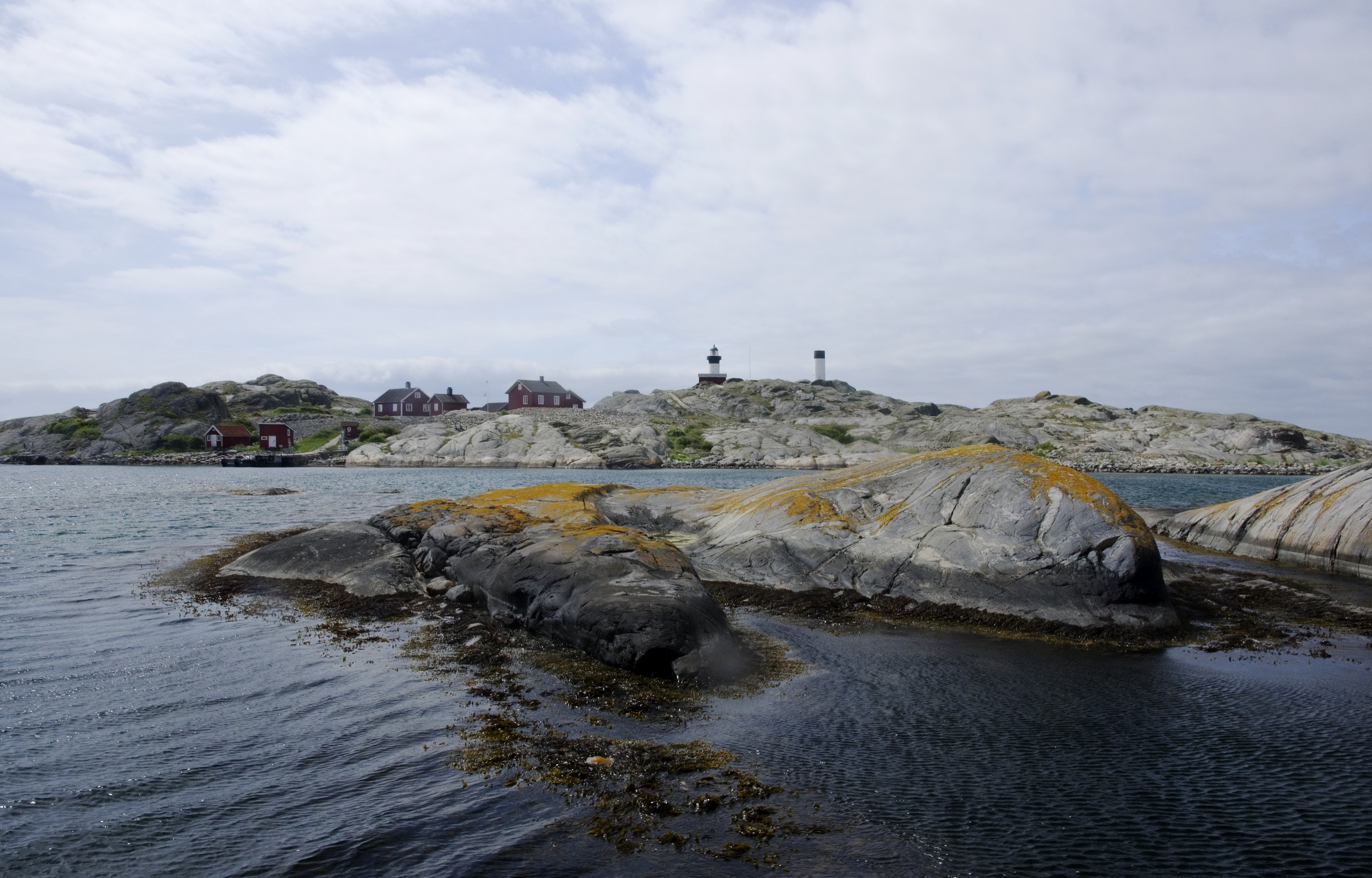
Kosterhavet National Park, Ursholmen island

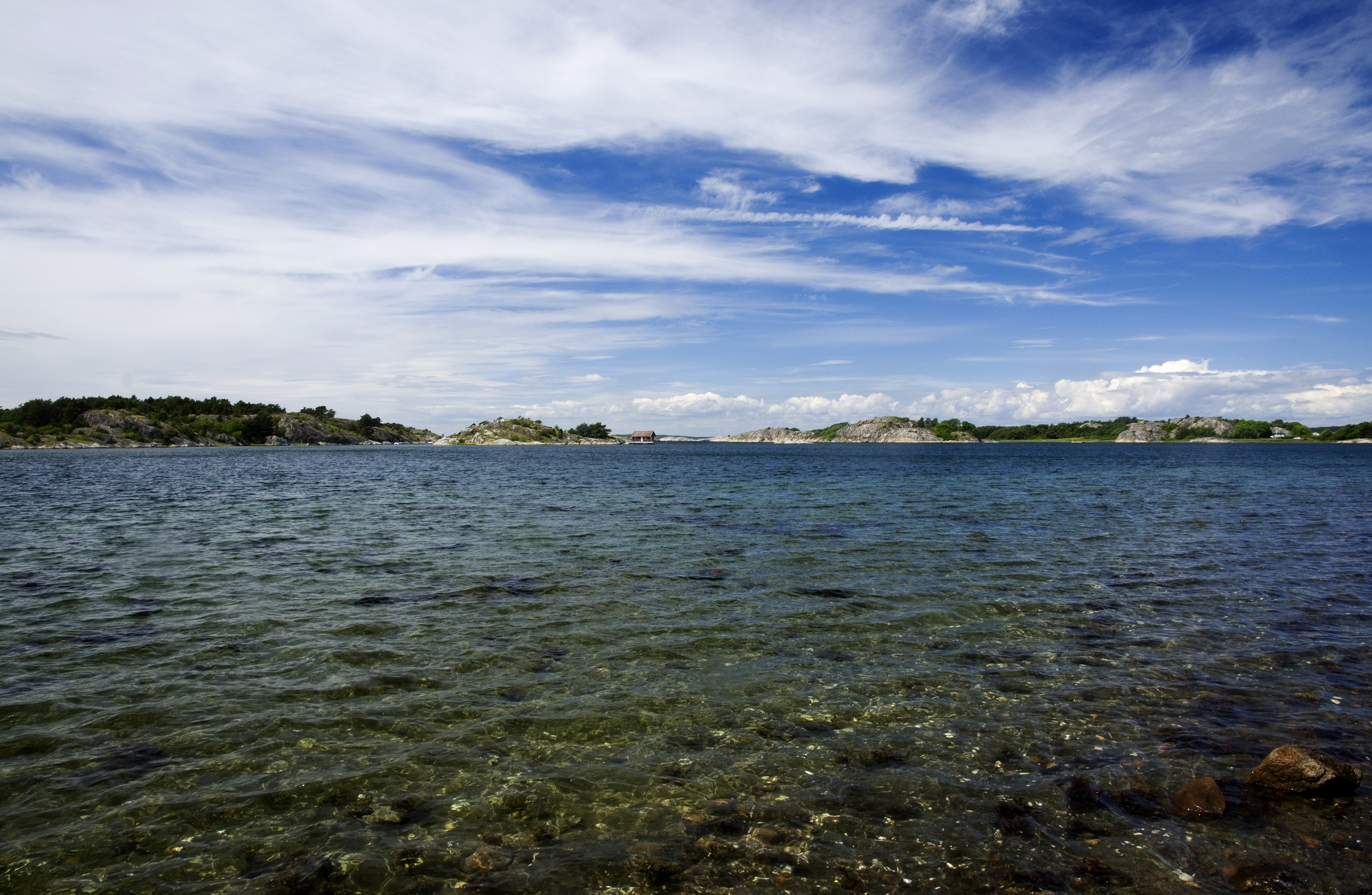
Kosterhavet National Park, sea

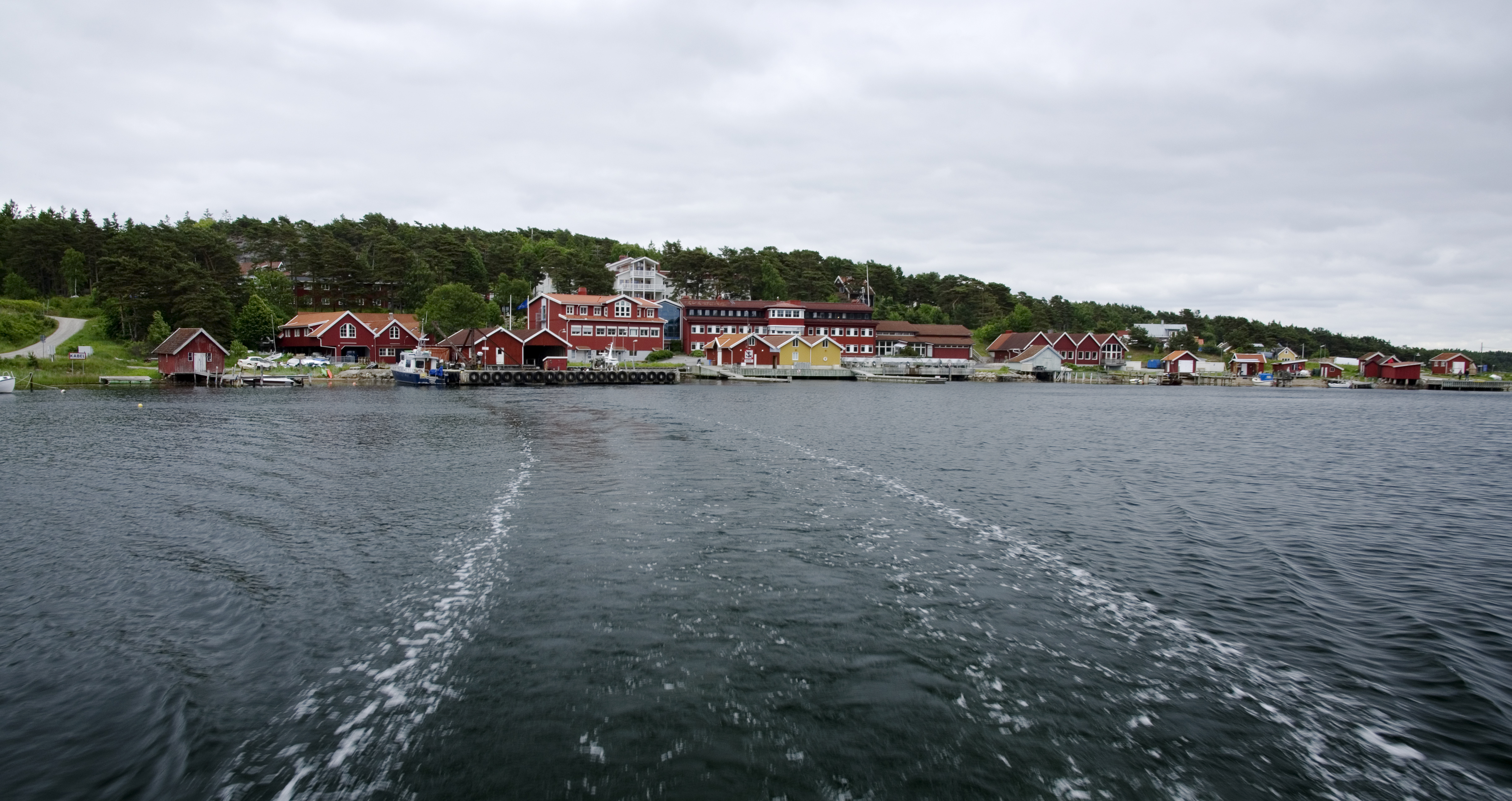
Tjärnö village

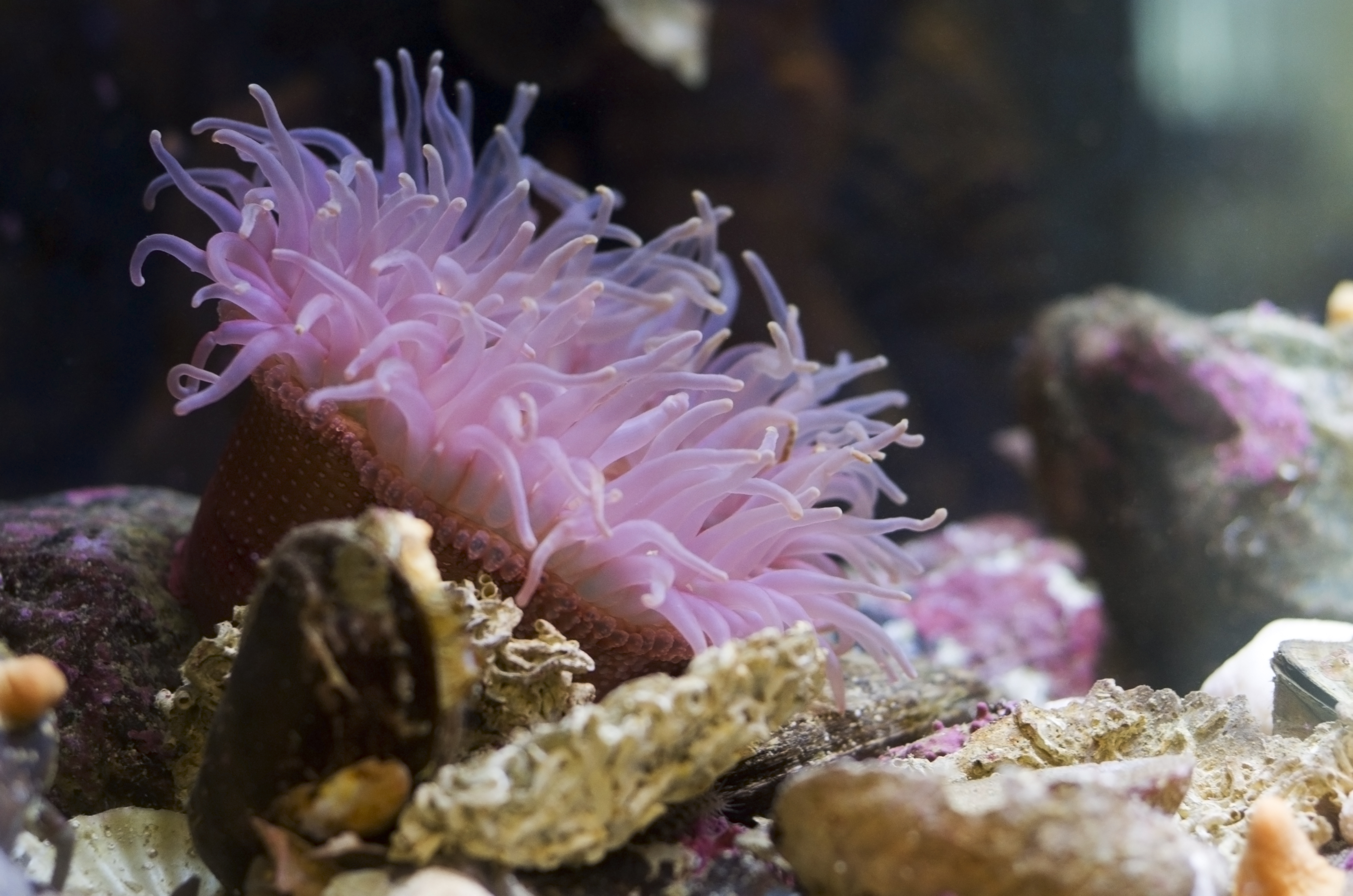
Anemone in the sea aquarium in Tjärnö
