= Strömstad =

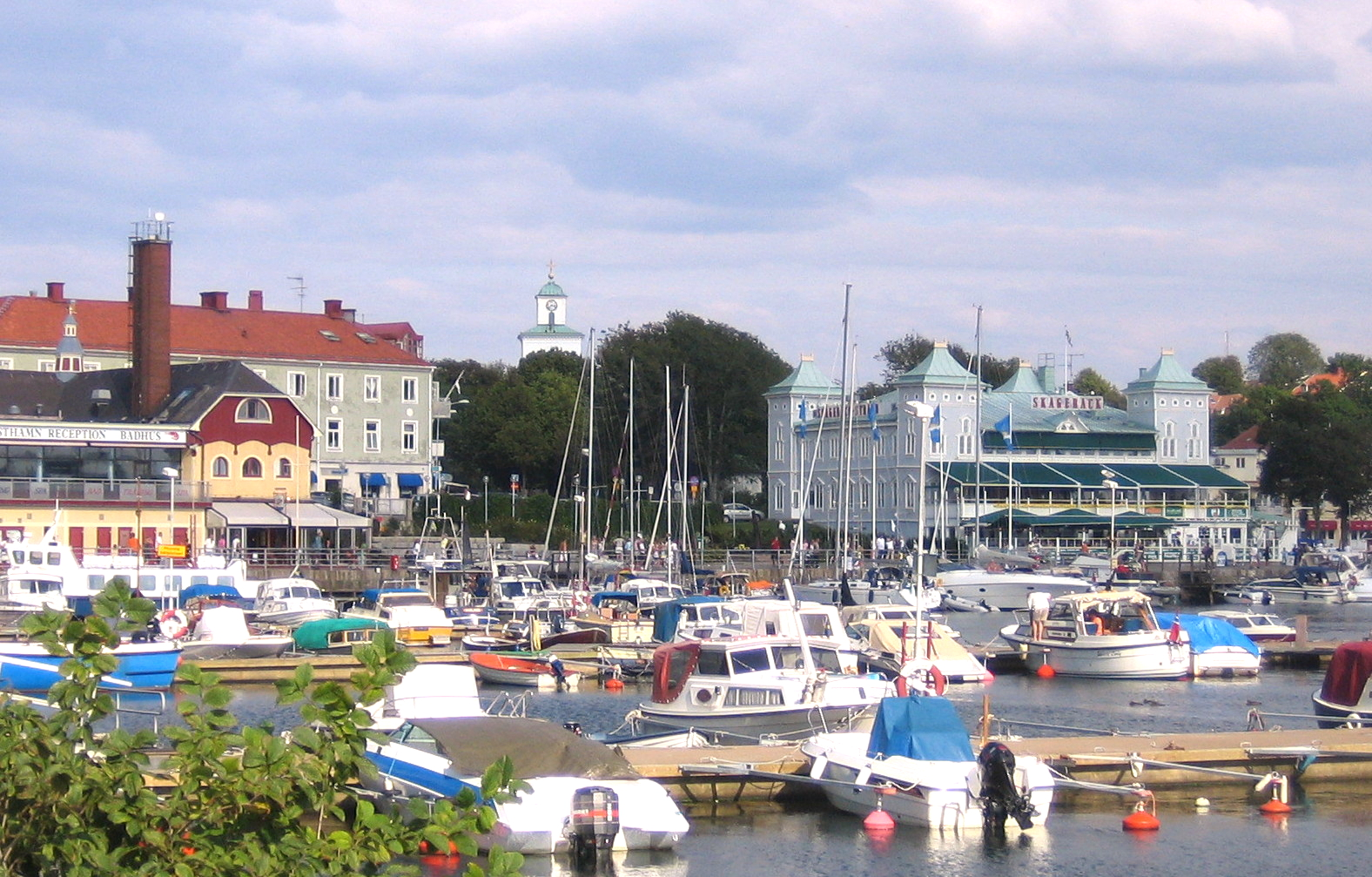
- Strömstad Harbor in August 2006

- Location within Västra Götaland Location within Sweden
- Coordinates: 58°56′N 11°11′E
- Country: Sweden
- Province: Bohuslän
- County: Västra Götaland County
- Municipality: Strömstad Municipality

Area
  - Total: 3.40 km^{2} (1.31 sq mi)

Population (31 December 2010)
  - Total: 6,288
  - Density: 1,847/km^{2} (4,780/sq mi)
- Time zone: UTC+1 (CET)
  - Summer (DST): UTC+2 (CEST)

Strömstad is a locality and the seat of Strömstad Municipality, Västra Götaland County, Sweden with 6,288 inhabitants in 2010. For historical reasons, Strömstad is called a city despite its small population.

Strömstad became part of Sweden in 1658, as part of the Treaty of Roskilde, which transferred the Bohuslän province from Norway to Sweden. It achieved town status in 1676. Strömstad became an important sea-bathing and spa destination in the mid-19th century. The close proximity to Norway is evident throughout town, and cars and boats arrive daily from Norway. Despite its small size, Strömstad is a bustling town throughout the year due to its international ferry link to Sandefjord, Norway. This is particularly true for Easter (especially Maundy Thursday) and the months of June and July, when thousands of vacationing Norwegians are visiting Strömstad.

Strömstad claims to have more summer sunshine days than any other town north of the Alps. Strömstad has numerous daily ferries departing and arriving from Sandefjord, Norway. It is also home to a domestic ferry connection to the Koster Islands, a nature preserve which is Sweden's westernmost populated islands.

It is home to Sweden's largest deepwater harbor.

== History ==
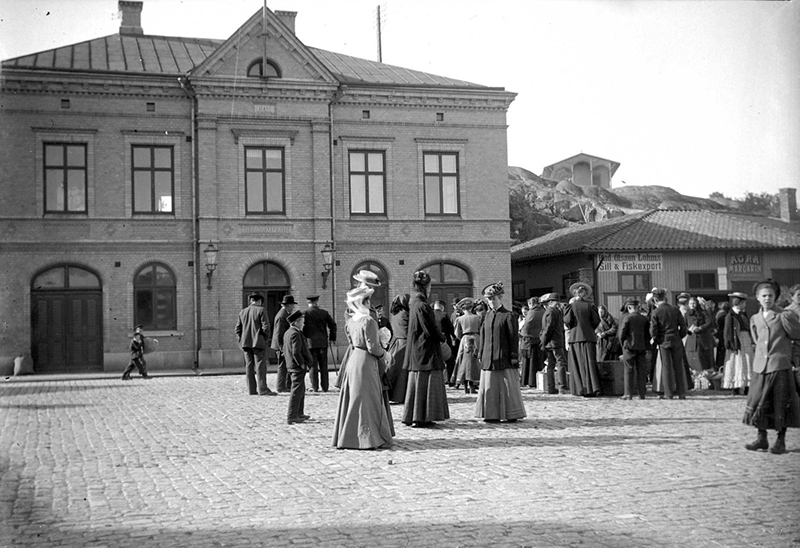
Strömstad harbour in 1907.

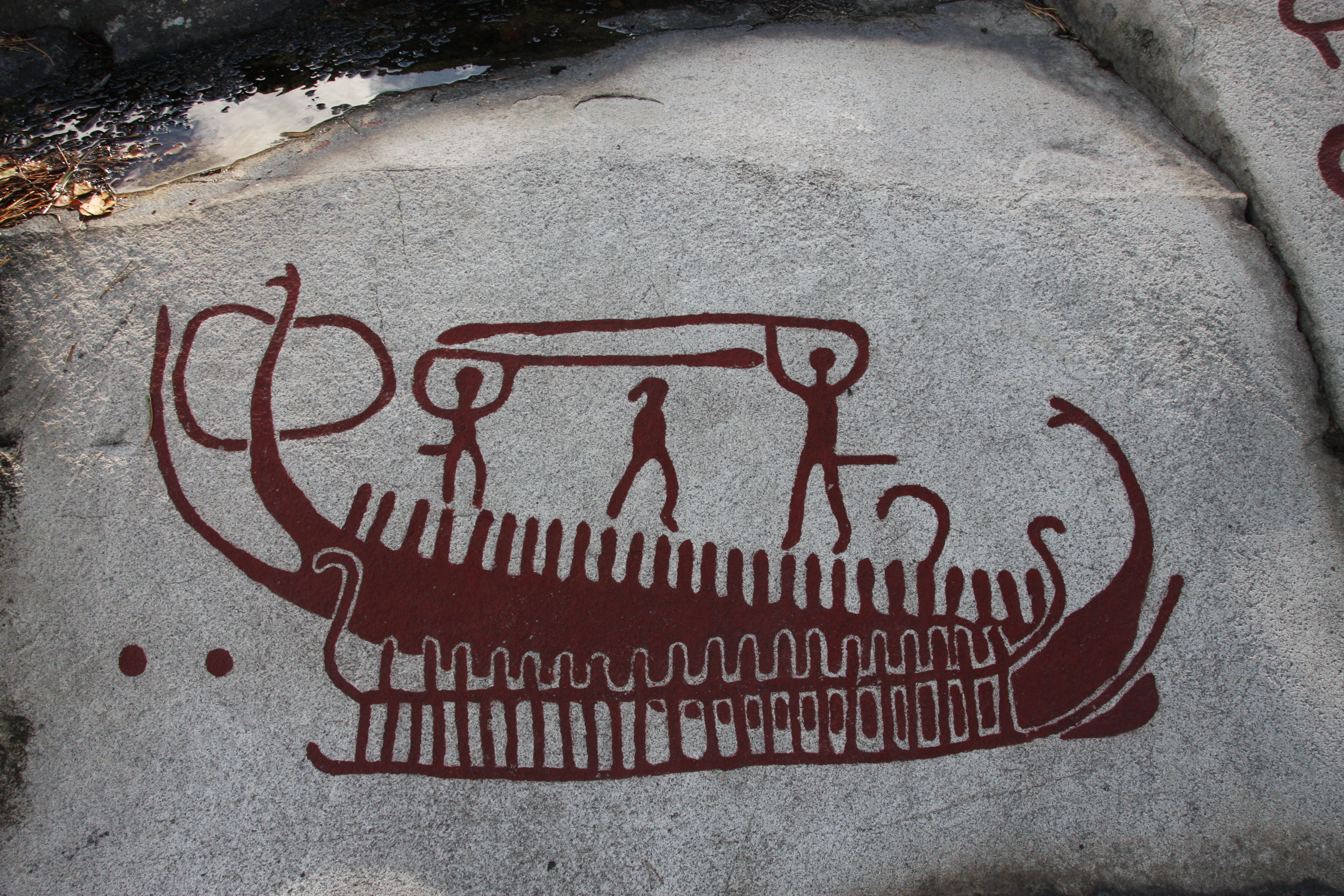
Petroglyph at Massleberg farm in Skee.

Originally, the province Bohuslän, where Strömstad is situated, was Norwegian territory, which was transferred to Sweden according to the Treaty of Roskilde in 1658.

At Strömstad, there was a small fishing village known as Strömmen. The town got small privileges as a merchant town (köping) shortly thereafter, which seems to have made it expand, because it is documented to have gotten a charter in 1676 by King Charles XI of Sweden, although some documents show it was already considered a city in 1672. As it was the seat for a merchant navy, the coat of arms was designed with such a ship, and has remained that way even after the use of sailing ships was discontinued in the 19th century.

The city was a seat for Sweden's warfare against the Dano-Norwegians, and more than once it was conquered and reconquered throughout the centuries. The warlike King Charles XII of Sweden, for instance, used it as his outpost for his campaign against Norway in 1716–1718.

At the time it had a population of 300 inhabitants. But soon the fishing blossomed, and its population increased to 1,100 by 1805. The late 18th century also saw the spa and bathing attract visitors, a position it kept throughout the 19th century. In 1786 Sweden's first hot baths were opened in the city. By 1917, its population was 2,949 inhabitants.

== Geography ==
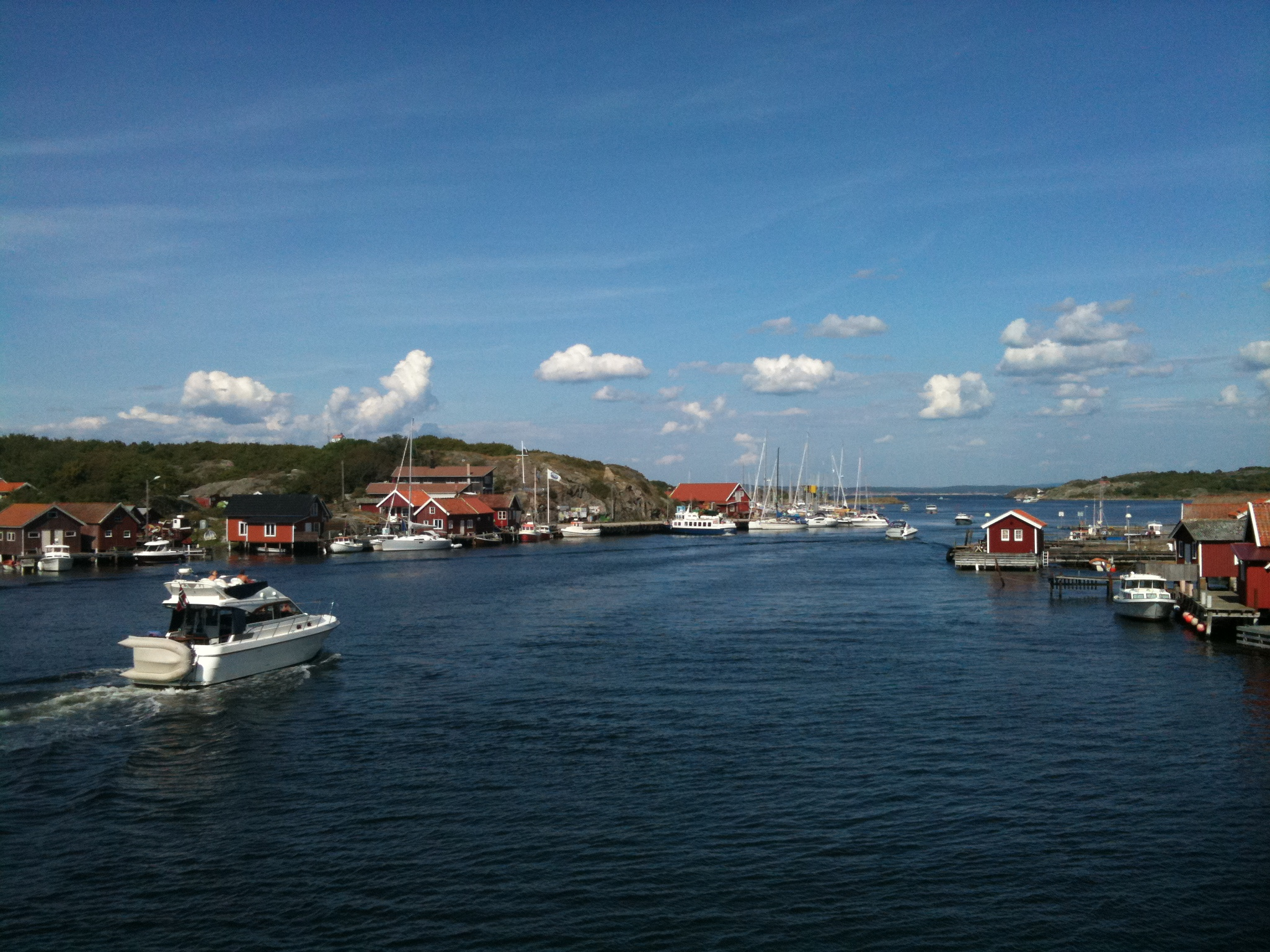
Koster Islands are surrounded by Kosterhavet National Park.

The municipality of Strömstad is located in the Bohuslän province of Västra Götaland County in western Sweden. It has an international border to Norway near Svinesund in the north. It has a total area of 472 km^{2} and is a coastal municipality. Strömstad is the administrative centre of the municipality, while minor towns include Skee, Kebal, and Svinesund. European route E6 traverses the municipality. Strömstad is the home of the Koster Islands. This archipelago consists of two main islands: North Koster (3.9 km^{2}) and South Koster (7.6 km^{2}). The islands are popular tourist destinations and the rural South Koster brags one of western Sweden's largest sandy beaches. The nearby Kosterhavet National Park is home to the country's largest seal colony. The islands are home to many vacation homes and various hotels. They are Sweden's westernmost populated islands.

== Notability ==
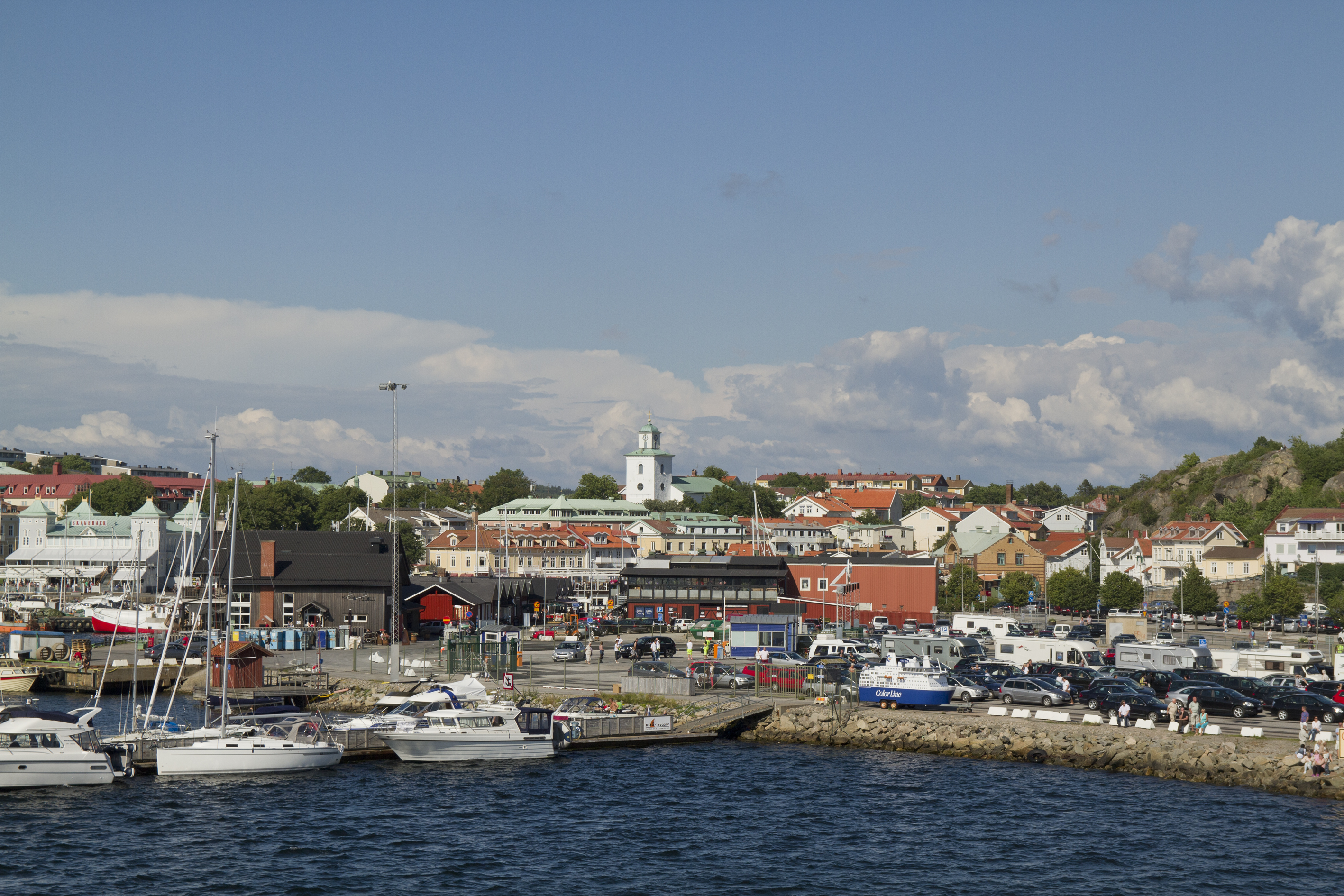
Strömstad as seen from the harbor.

As the Norwegian alcohol taxes are higher than the Swedish ones, Norwegian shoppers have caused the Swedish alcohol retailing monopoly Systembolaget to open an extra store to cater for demand. When only one shop existed, the Systembolaget shop had the highest sales in Sweden, causing traffic congestion near the shop in the inner city. The Norwegians have been notoriously known for causing havoc on Maundy Thursday as this is a public holiday in Norway but not in Sweden. For Easter 2008 the city council decided to keep Systembolaget closed on Maundy Thursday.

The city is known for its yachting harbor, which can be very crowded in the summer. From Strömstad is ferry line over to Sandefjord, Norway, at the west side of the Oslofjord and local ferries to the Koster Islands.

Strömstad is the setting for the play The Creditors by August Strindberg.

Black Metal band Dissection are from the city.

Author Emelie Flygare Carlén was born in the city in 1807. As a source of life in Bohuslän during the first half of the 19th century, she is invaluable. During the 1840s she was at the peak of her career, and was then Sweden's most read novelist and the most well known abroad.

== Economy ==
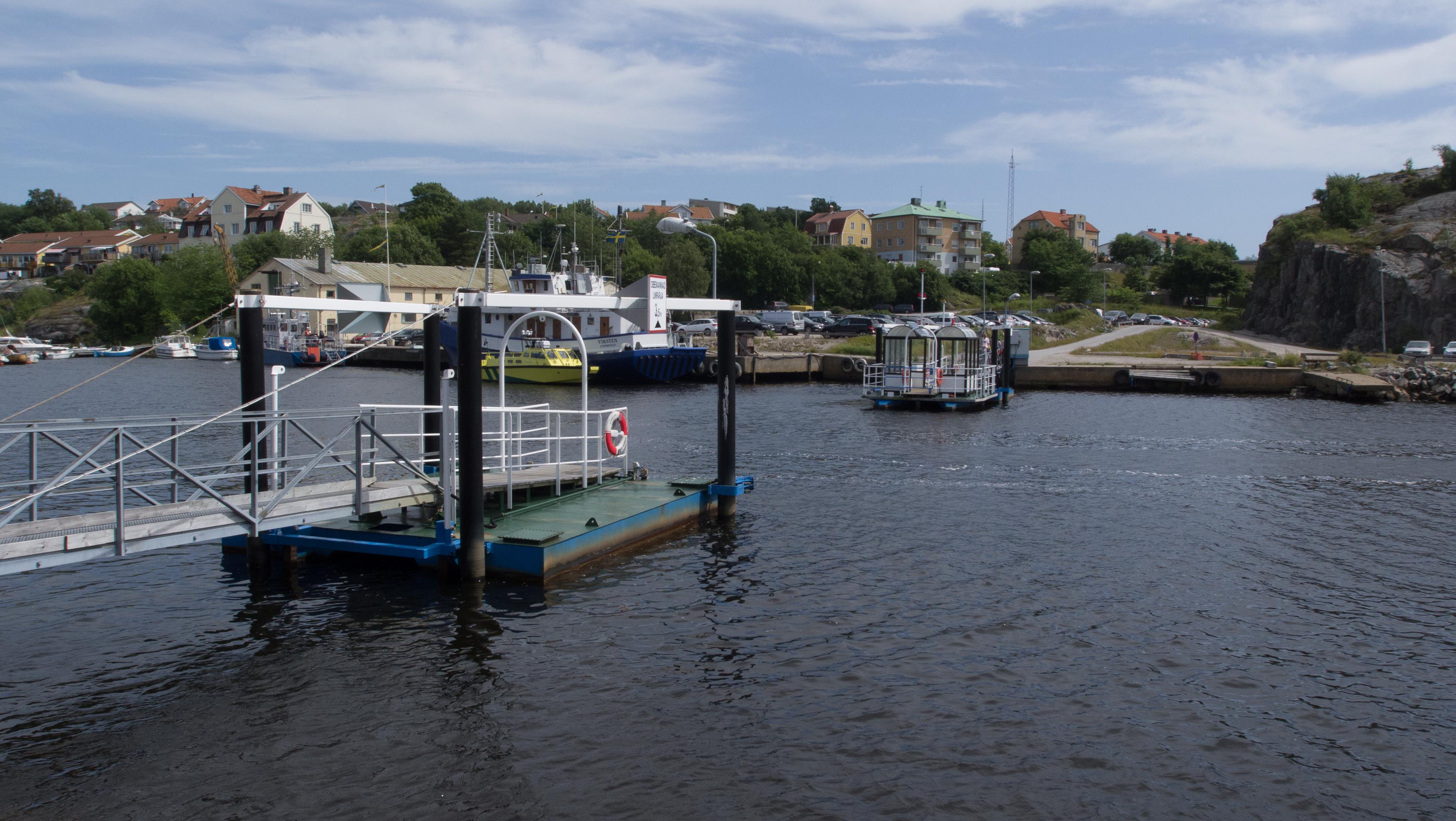
Linfärjan Bojan transfers passengers over Bojarkilen, between Canning and Kebal.

=== Tourism ===
It was an 18th-century spa resort, and currently sees a large influx of tourists from Norway.

Strömstad has a long tradition as a bathing city; it was home to Sweden's first facilities for sea bathing, which was established in 1783. Besides tourism, other industries include fishing and fish processing. About 600 people commute to Norway for work.

== Sports ==
The following sports clubs are located in Strömstad:

- IFK Strömstad

Strömstad was the host of the 2016 World Orienteering Championships.

== Transportation ==
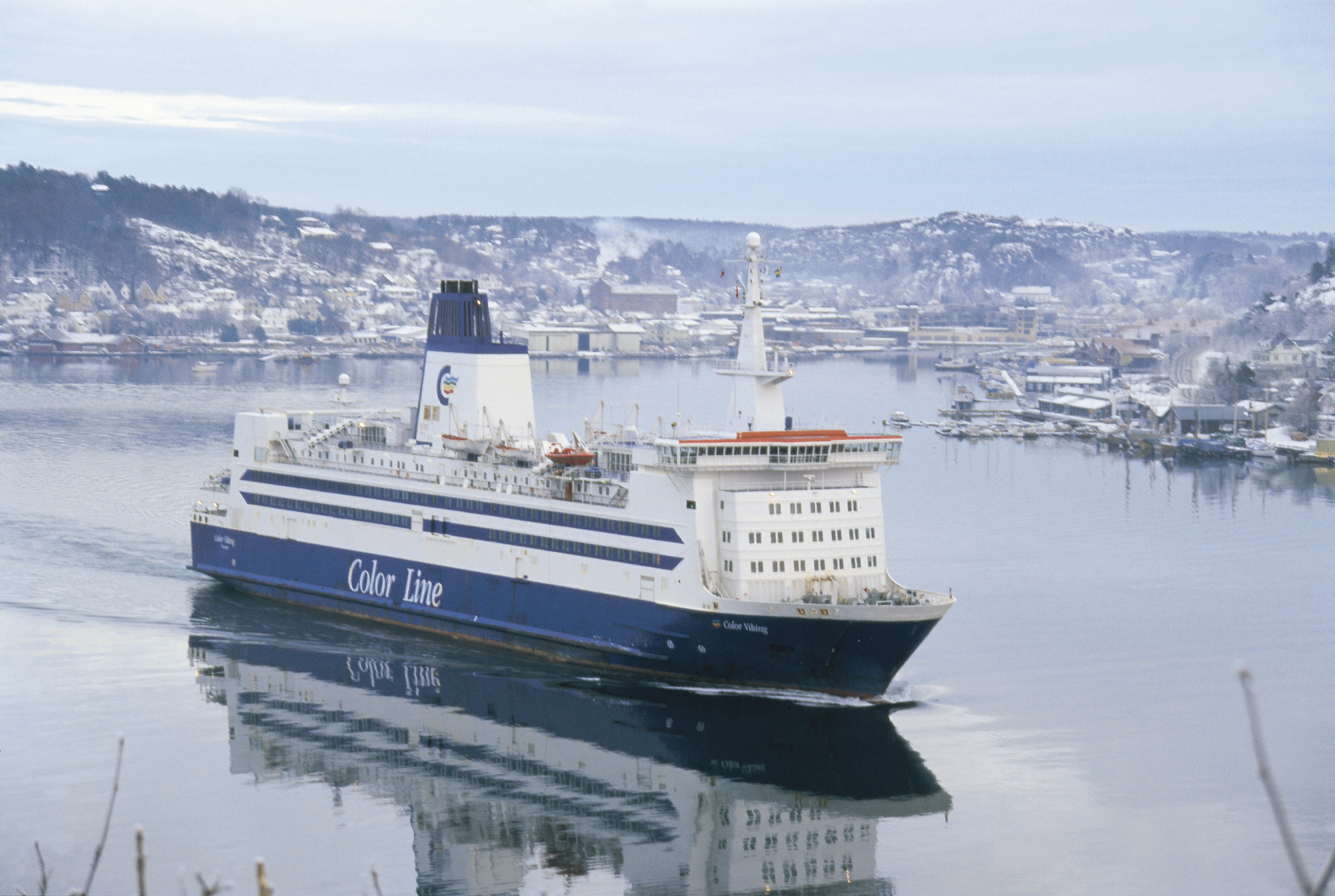
Daily ferries to Sandefjord, Norway are provided by Color Line and Fjord Line.

The train- and adjacent bus stations are located on Södra Hammen, across the street from the international ferry terminal on Uddevallavägen. The Bohus Line runs from Gothenburg through the industrial city of Uddevalla, before terminating in Strömstad. The city can be reached by train from Gothenburg, and from Smögen by bus. By car, it can be reached by taking Route 174 on European route E6. It is situated 100 km north of Smögen, and 25 km north of Tanumshede.

Strömstad has two daily ferry connections: an international route to Sandefjord, Norway, and a domestic route to the Koster Islands from Norra Hamnen. The Koster Islands are a nature reserve and the westernmost inhabited islands in Sweden. The islands enjoy more sunshine hours than almost anywhere else in Sweden.

== Attractions ==
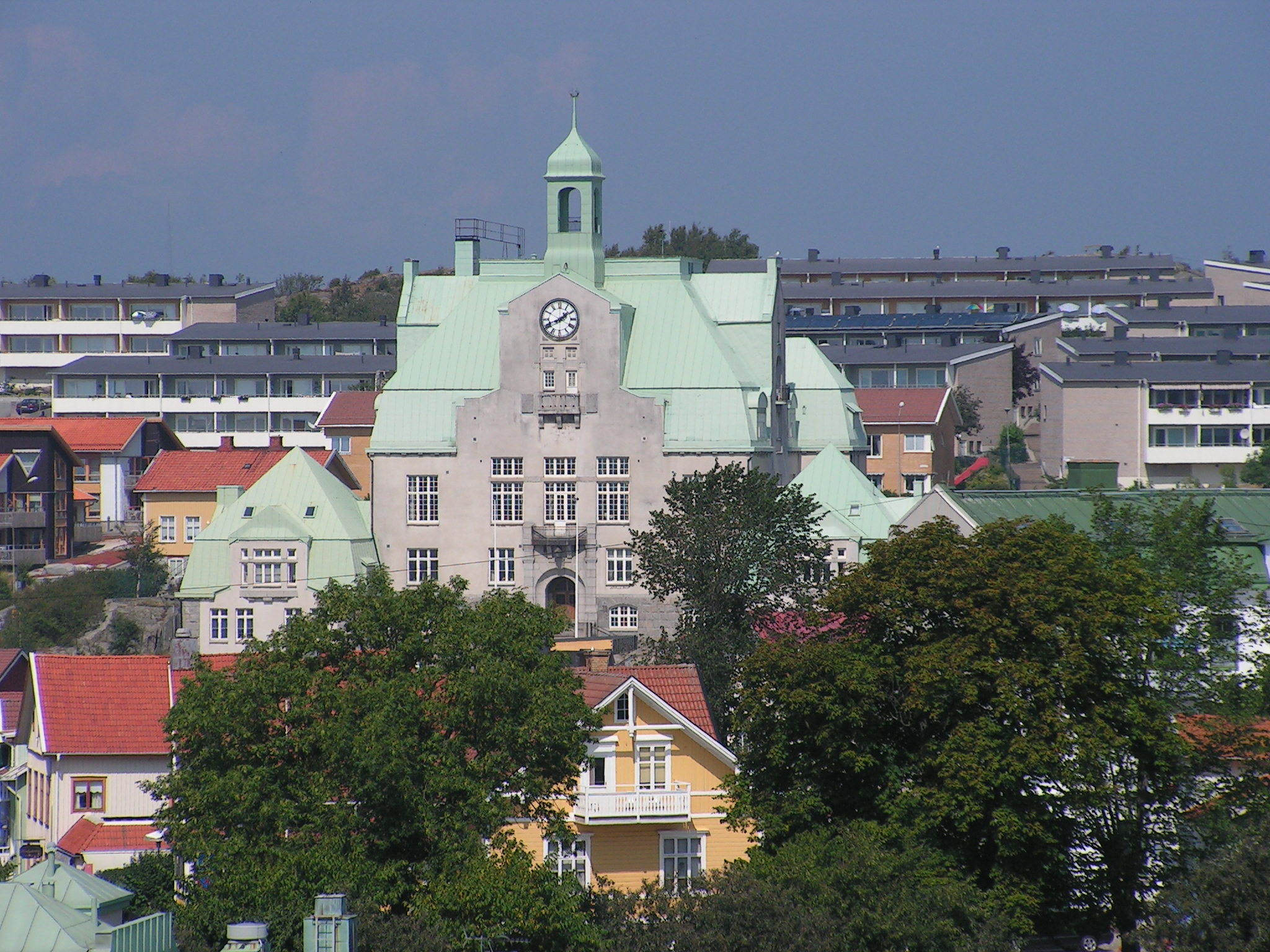
Town Hall ("Stadshus").

Attractions in Strömstad include the Strömstad Museum, which is focused on local history, while Friluftsmuseet Fiskartorpet is an outdoor museum featuring fishermen's cottages. The harbor houses numerous shops, bars, and restaurants. Boats depart for several islands, including the Koster Islands. Seal safari tours are also available around Ursholmarna Islands. Nature preserves on Rossö and Saltö Islands can be reached by car.

Other attractions include Strömstad Church in the city center, which has decorative features such as busy frescoes, ship models hanging from the ceiling, 1970s brass lamps, and gilt chandeliers. Concerts are often held at Lokstallet Konsthall on Uddevallavägen 1. Another site is the Town Hall ("Stadshus"), erected in 1917.

== Twin towns ==
Strömstad is twinned with the town of Ledbury, England. The partnership began in 2000, and continues to be an important part of both towns' international relations.

== Notable people ==
- Mouhammed-Ali Dhaini (born 1994), footballer
- Jon Nödtveidt (born 1975, died 2006), musician

== Gallery ==
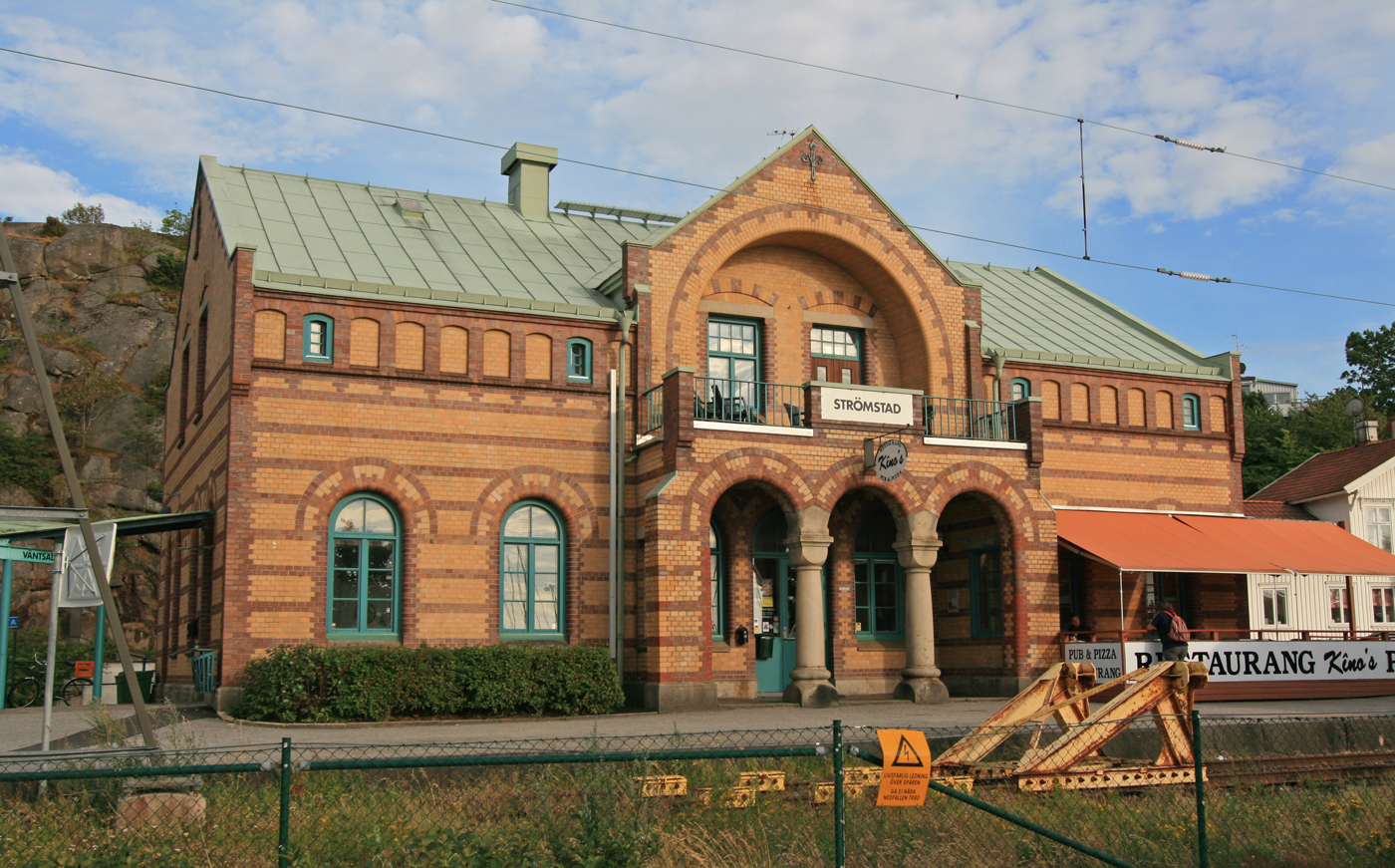
Strömstad Station

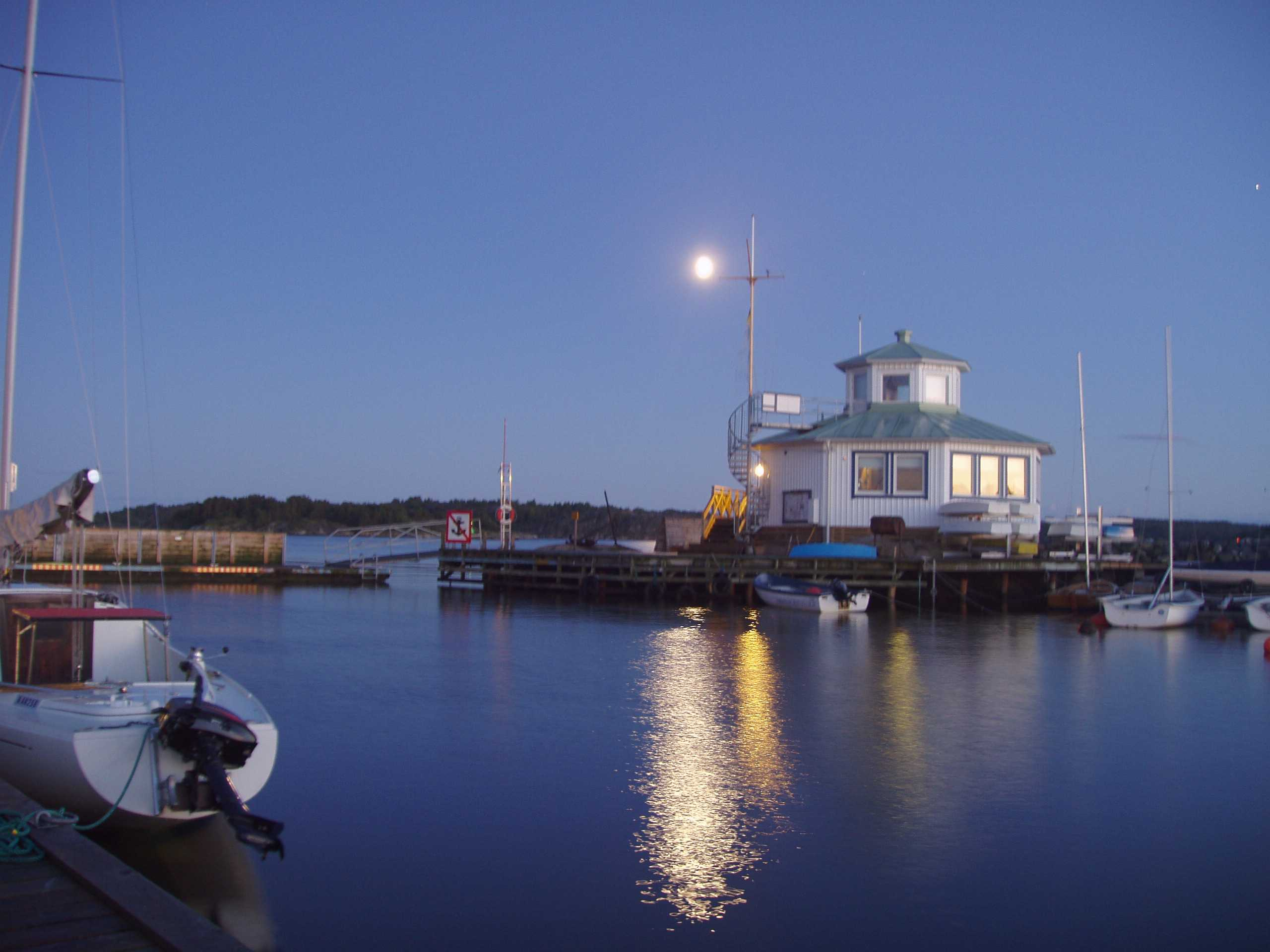
From Strömstad Marina

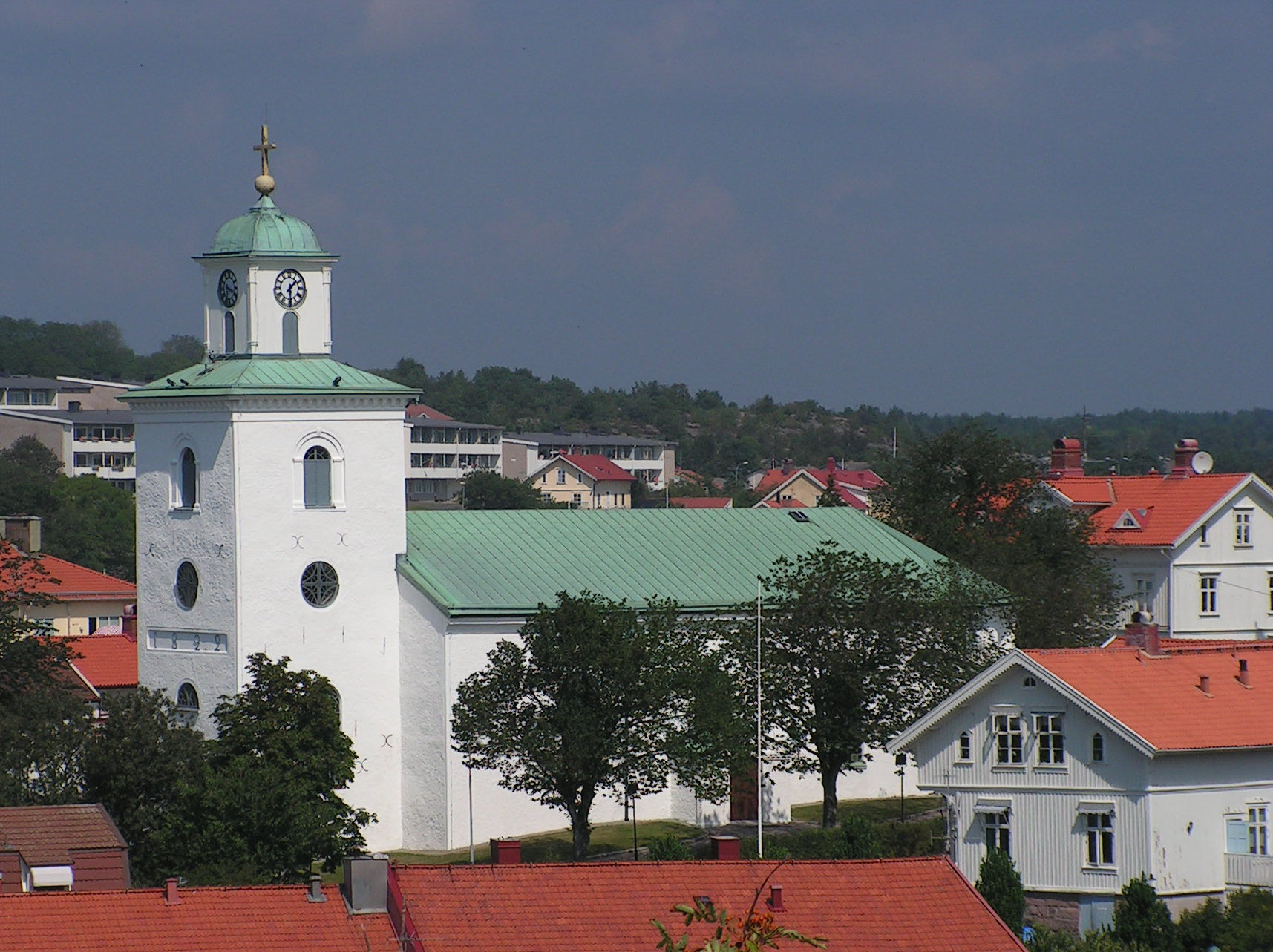
Strömstads Church

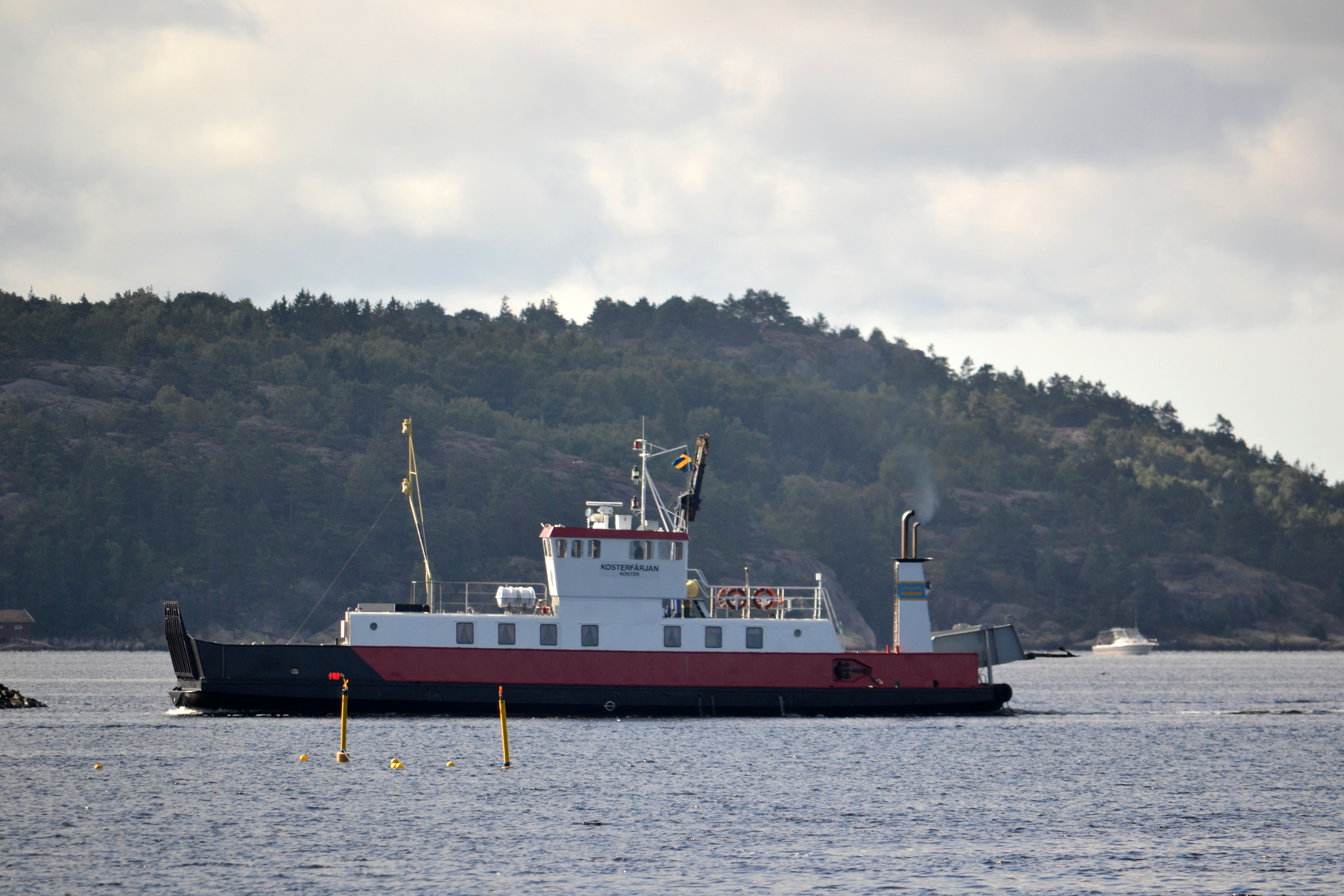
Ferry to Koster Islands
