= Kebal =

Village in Västra Götaland County, Sweden

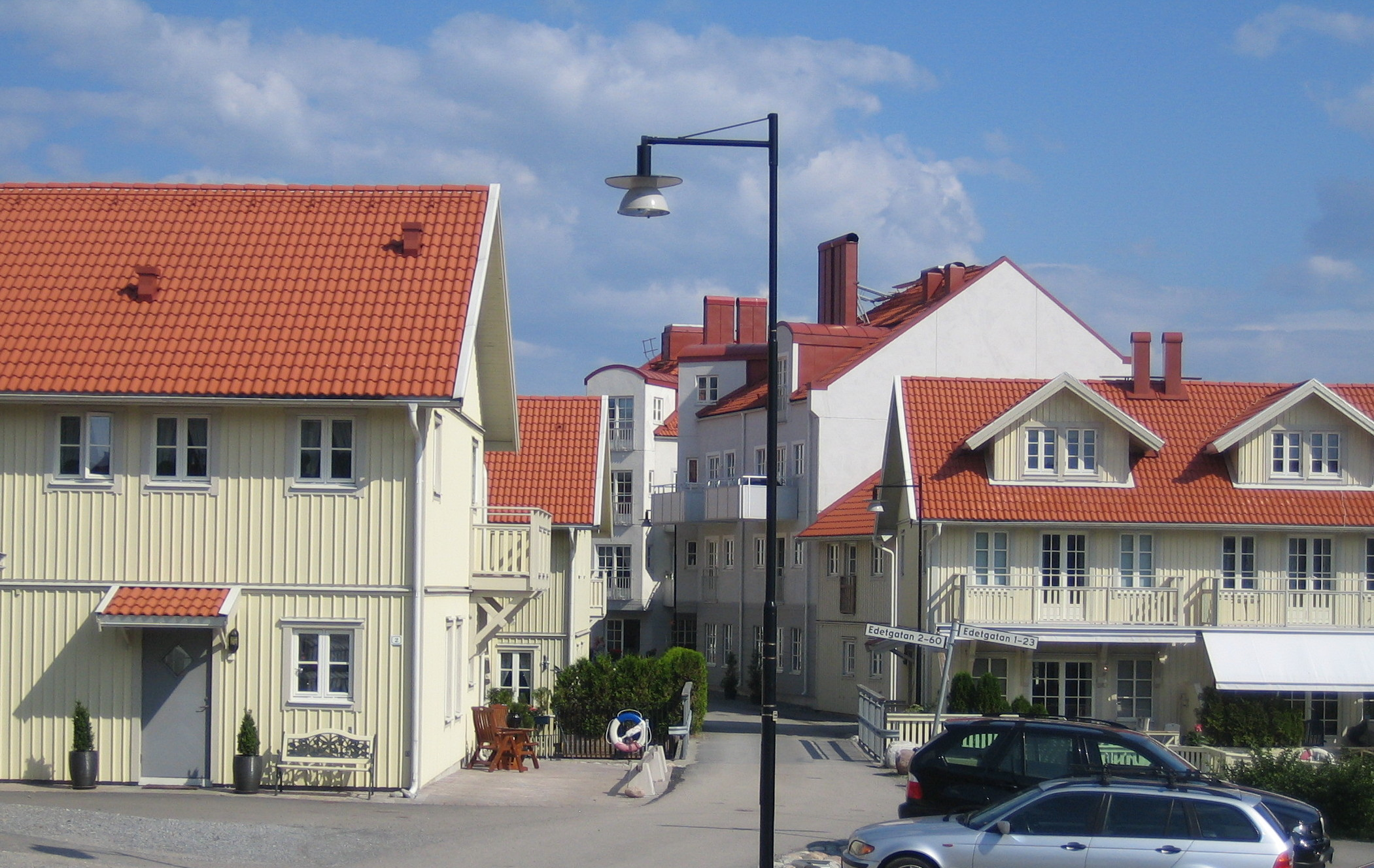

- Location within Västra Götaland Location within Sweden
- Coordinates: 58°56′40″N 11°09′30″E
- Country: Sweden
- Province: Bohuslän
- County: Västra Götaland County
- Municipality: Strömstad Municipality

Area
  - Total: 0.28 km^{2} (0.11 sq mi)

Population (31 December 2010)
  - Total: 258
  - Density: 933/km^{2} (2,420/sq mi)
- Time zone: UTC+1 (CET)
  - Summer (DST): UTC+2 (CEST)

Kebal is a locality situated in Strömstad Municipality, Västra Götaland County, Sweden with 258 inhabitants in 2010.
