= Koster Islands =

Archipelago in Sweden

Coordinates: 58°53′N 11°0′E

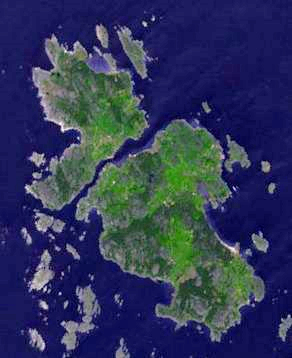
Satellite photo of Koster Islands.

The Koster Islands (Swedish: Kosteröarna) situated 10 km west of Strömstad, Sweden, comprises an archipelago surrounding the two largest islands, South Koster and North Koster. South Koster has an area of 8 km^{2} and North Koster an area of 4 km^{2}. The landscape, dominated by smooth bedrock, bears witness to volcanic activity and subsequent wear due to the Ice Age. The rocky coastline is broken by many sandy beaches, the largest being Kilesand on South Koster's east side overlooking the 200 meter deep Koster Fjord.

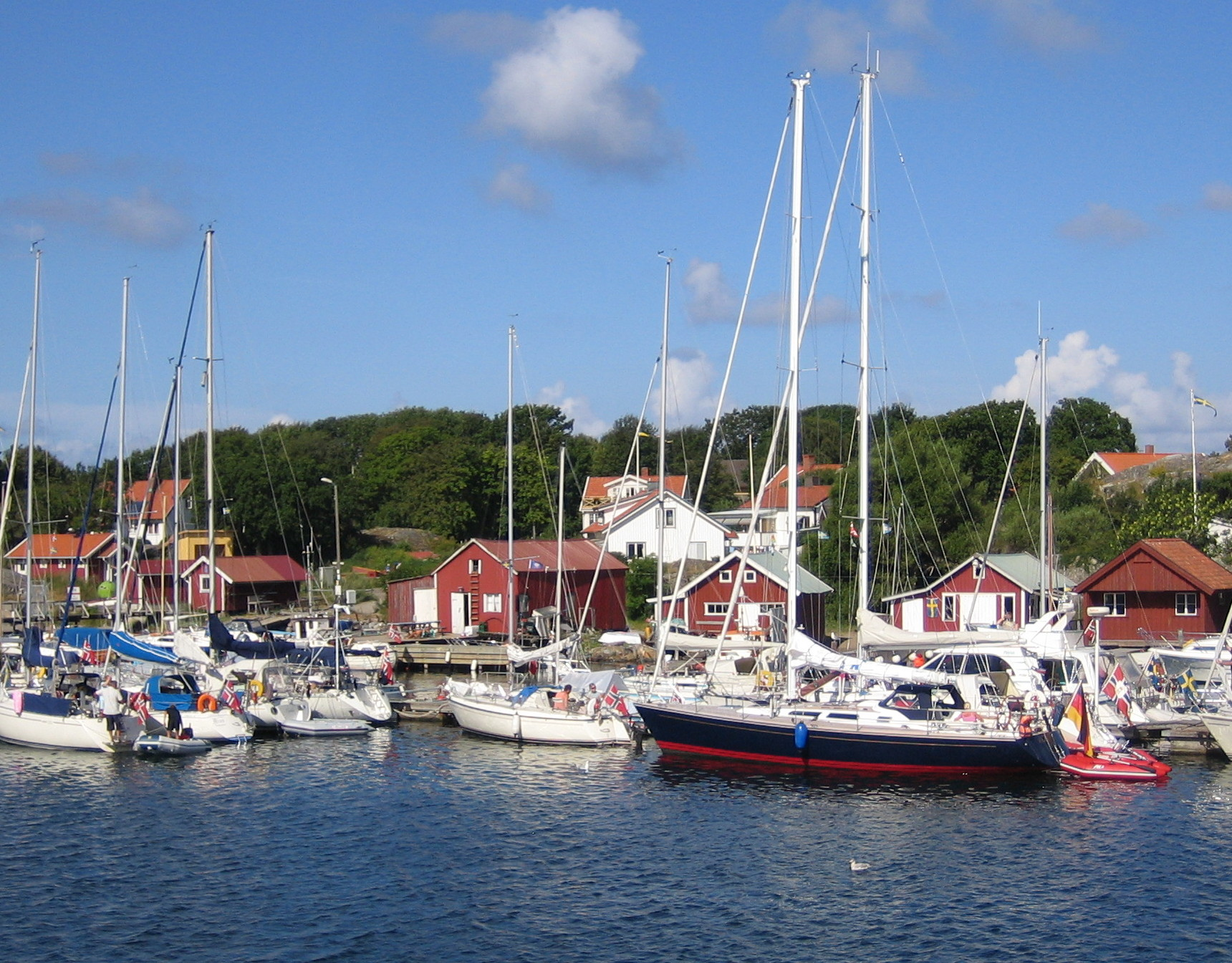
The narrow sound between North and South Koster.

== Communities ==
South and North Koster are communities with a permanent population of around 340. There is a school, sports hall, shops, church, and galleries where handcrafts and arts are exhibited. Both farming and fishing are important, and during the 1600s Koster exported lobster to Holland. There are several small harbors, popular with sailors from both near and far. Rooms can be rented from the Ekenäs Hotel or from private homes or cabins. There is also a campsite on North Koster.

An electrically-driven ferry operates constantly between the two islands, a distance of 58 meters. Travel from Strömstad takes around 45 minutes. As one moves inland, farmland, woods and rich vegetation become apparent and there are many trails. South Koster has a network of roads and paths, which can be explored by bicycle or in small golf buggies, both of which can be rented. On North Koster, it is also possible to rent small boats. Restrictions regarding the right of access, Allemansrätten, forbid open fires, and camping is only allowed at the designated campsite. Private cars are not permitted.

A prawn and Norwegiean lobster inshore fishery is present at Kosterhavet National Park, the national park located at the Koster Islands. Local citizens administrate both the fishery and national park.

== Climate ==
The Koster Islands have a marine west coast climate that has a narrower range of temperatures than inland and areas on the east coast on similar parallels. The islands have a small diurnal temperature variation resulting in mild night time temperatures with frosts being less common than expected for areas on similar parallels both in Sweden and globally. Despite this, sleet was recorded on Nordkoster as late as June 12, 1981, at a temperature of only +2.7 °C.

Climate data for Nordkoster
Month	Jan	Feb	Mar	Apr	May	Jun	Jul	Aug	Sep	Oct	Nov	Dec	Year
Record high °C (°F)	10.1 (50.2)	8.9 (48.0)	15.5 (59.9)	24.0 (75.2)	29.7 (85.5)	29.9 (85.8)	30.3 (86.5)	30.5 (86.9)	25.5 (77.9)	18.6 (65.5)	14.1 (57.4)	10.8 (51.4)	30.5 (86.9)
Mean daily maximum °C (°F)	2.1 (35.8)	1.5 (34.7)	4.5 (40.1)	9.6 (49.3)	14.3 (57.7)	17.9 (64.2)	20.5 (68.9)	20.2 (68.4)	16.3 (61.3)	10.8 (51.4)	7.0 (44.6)	3.7 (38.7)	10.7 (51.3)
Daily mean °C (°F)	0.2 (32.4)	−0.2 (31.6)	2.2 (36.0)	6.8 (44.2)	11.4 (52.5)	16.1 (61.0)	17.9 (64.2)	17.5 (63.5)	13.9 (57.0)	8.8 (47.8)	5.3 (41.5)	1.8 (35.2)	8.4 (47.1)
Mean daily minimum °C (°F)	−1.6 (29.1)	−2.0 (28.4)	0.0 (32.0)	4.0 (39.2)	8.5 (47.3)	12.3 (54.1)	15.2 (59.4)	14.9 (58.8)	11.6 (52.9)	6.9 (44.4)	3.6 (38.5)	0.0 (32.0)	6.1 (43.0)
Record low °C (°F)	−22.3 (−8.1)	−20.5 (−4.9)	−15.2 (4.6)	−5.3 (22.5)	−1.7 (28.9)	2.7 (36.9)	5.6 (42.1)	7.0 (44.6)	1.2 (34.2)	−6.1 (21.0)	−10.2 (13.6)	−17.9 (−0.2)	−22.3 (−8.1)
Average precipitation mm (inches)	48 (1.9)	42 (1.7)	40 (1.6)	40 (1.6)	43 (1.7)	49 (1.9)	46 (1.8)	65 (2.6)	68 (2.7)	80 (3.1)	69 (2.7)	47 (1.9)	627 (24.7)
Source 1: SMHI Precipitation Normals
Source 2: SMHI Monthly Data 2002-2015

== Tourism on the islands ==
Koster is a well-established and popular tourist destination, attracting as many as 90,000 tourists each year, renowned for being one of Sweden's sunniest places offering bathing opportunities. Other activities include hiking, cycling, kayaking, and swimming. During the summer there are a variety of events, such as a music festival, mackerel race, and trips to the seal colonies. Several pubs and restaurants offer a varied menu, often based on seafood from local fishermen, such as shrimp, oyster, crayfish, crab, and lobster.

Connections to the mainland are good with sixteen ferry departures daily from Strömstad, a crossing of around 45 minutes. Private cars can be parked at the car park just outside the center of Strömstad from where buses run free of charge to the harbor square.

Kosterhavet National Park consists of the water and shores of the Koster islands, and is a tourist attraction. It has four trails which cross approximately 14km of the island. Furthermore, the national park holds thousands of plants and animals, more than other location in Sweden.

== Gallery ==
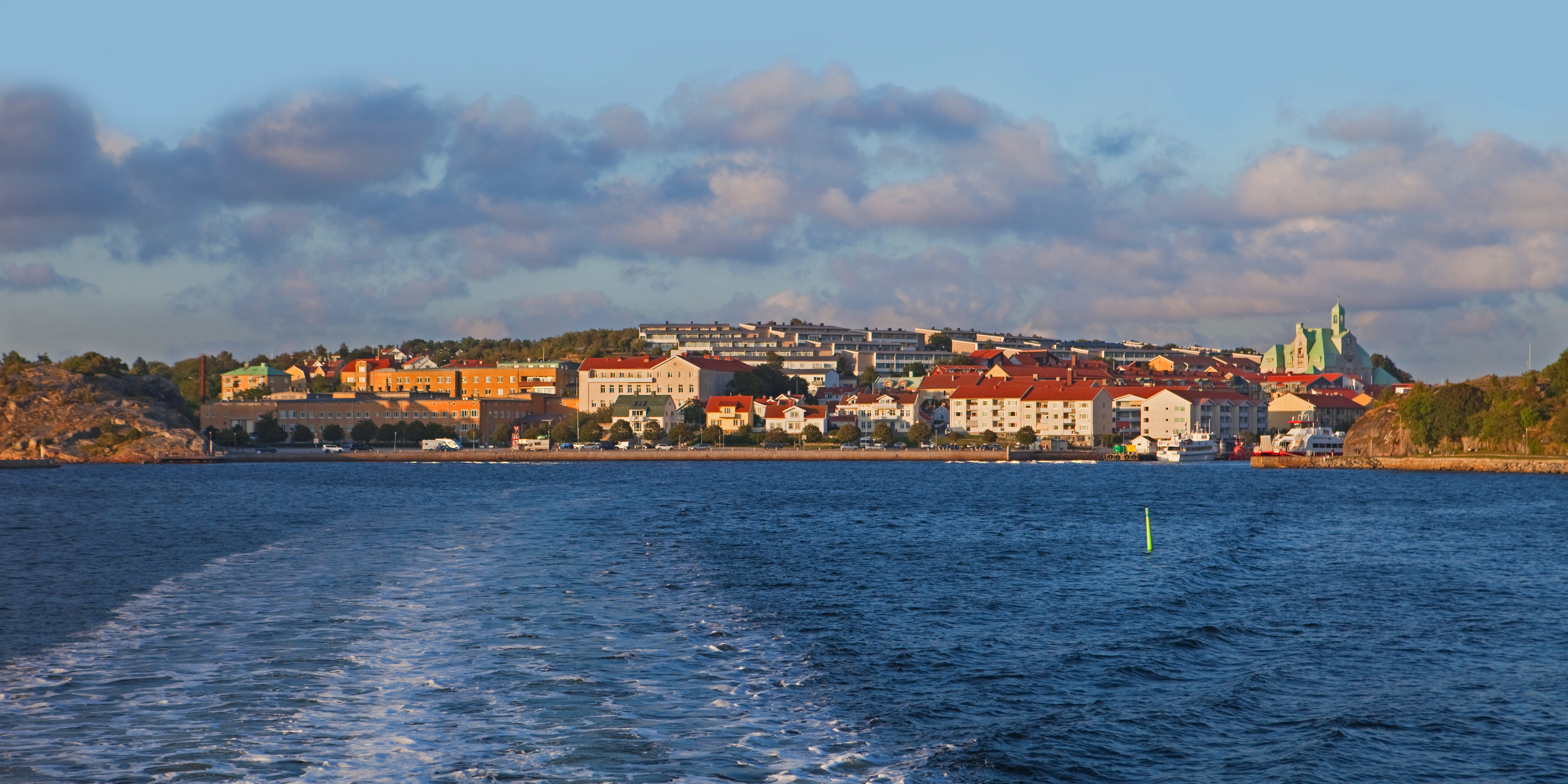
Strömstad on the mainland, August 2012

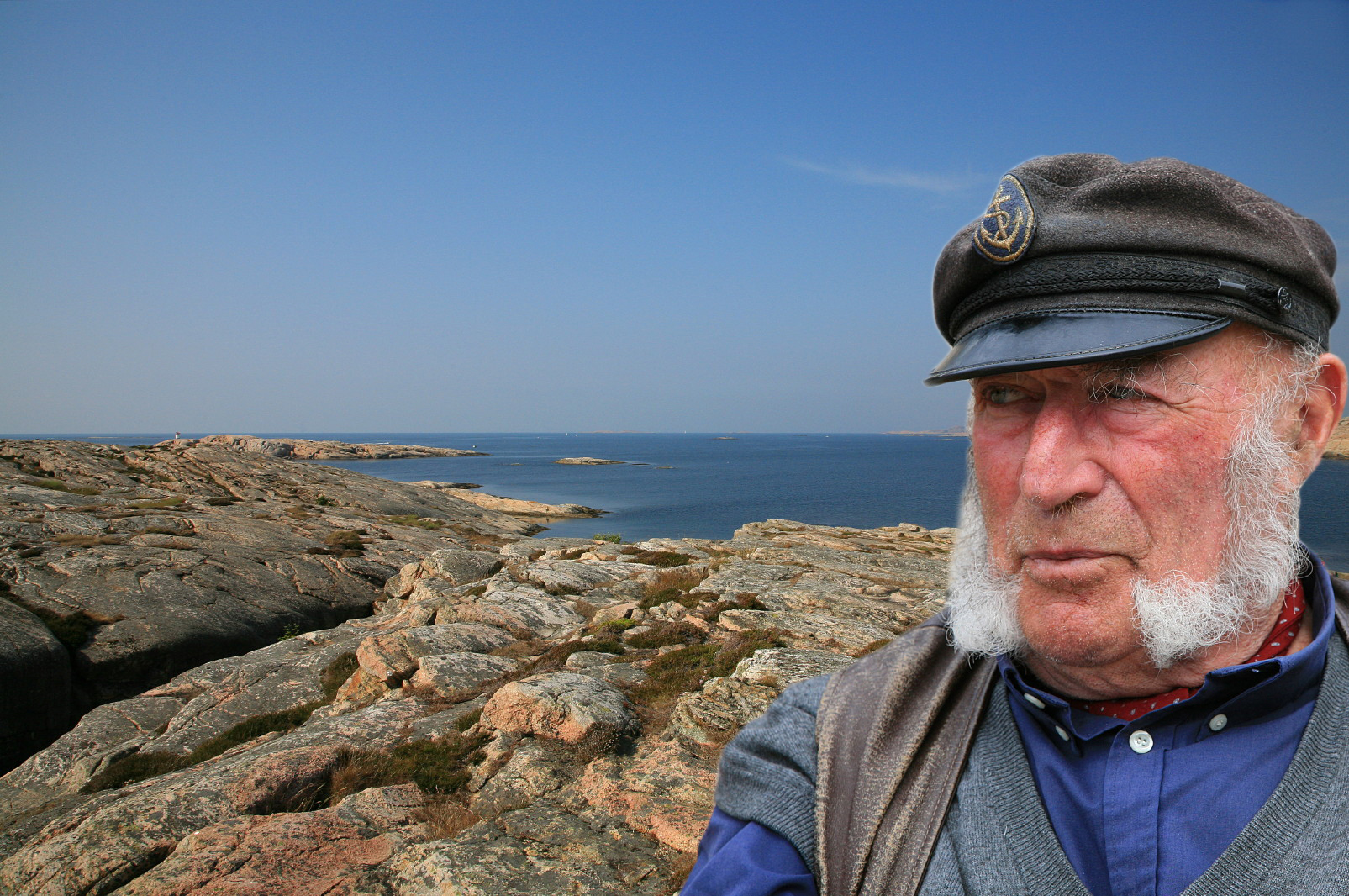
Koster fisherman

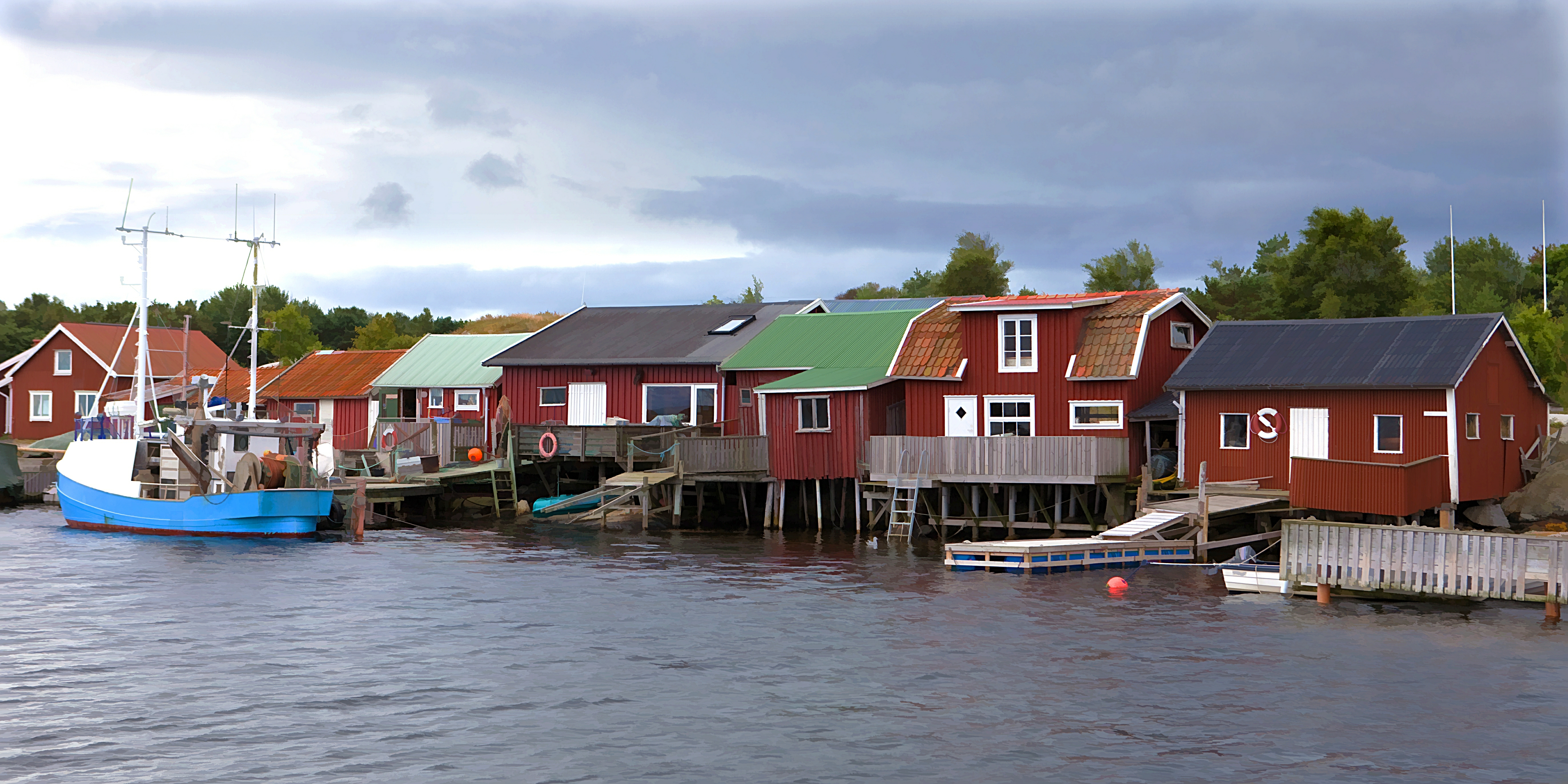
Boathouses

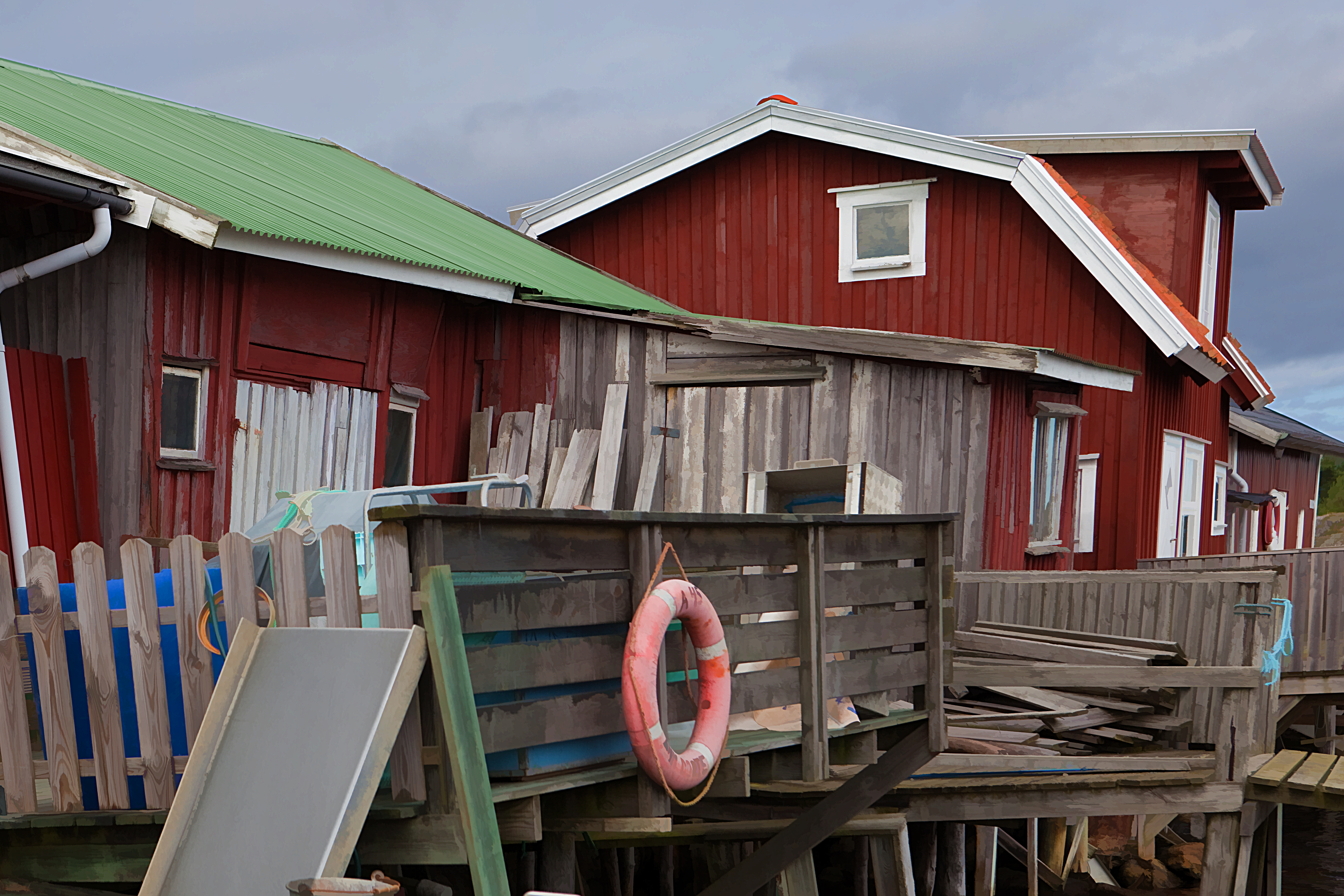
Boathouses

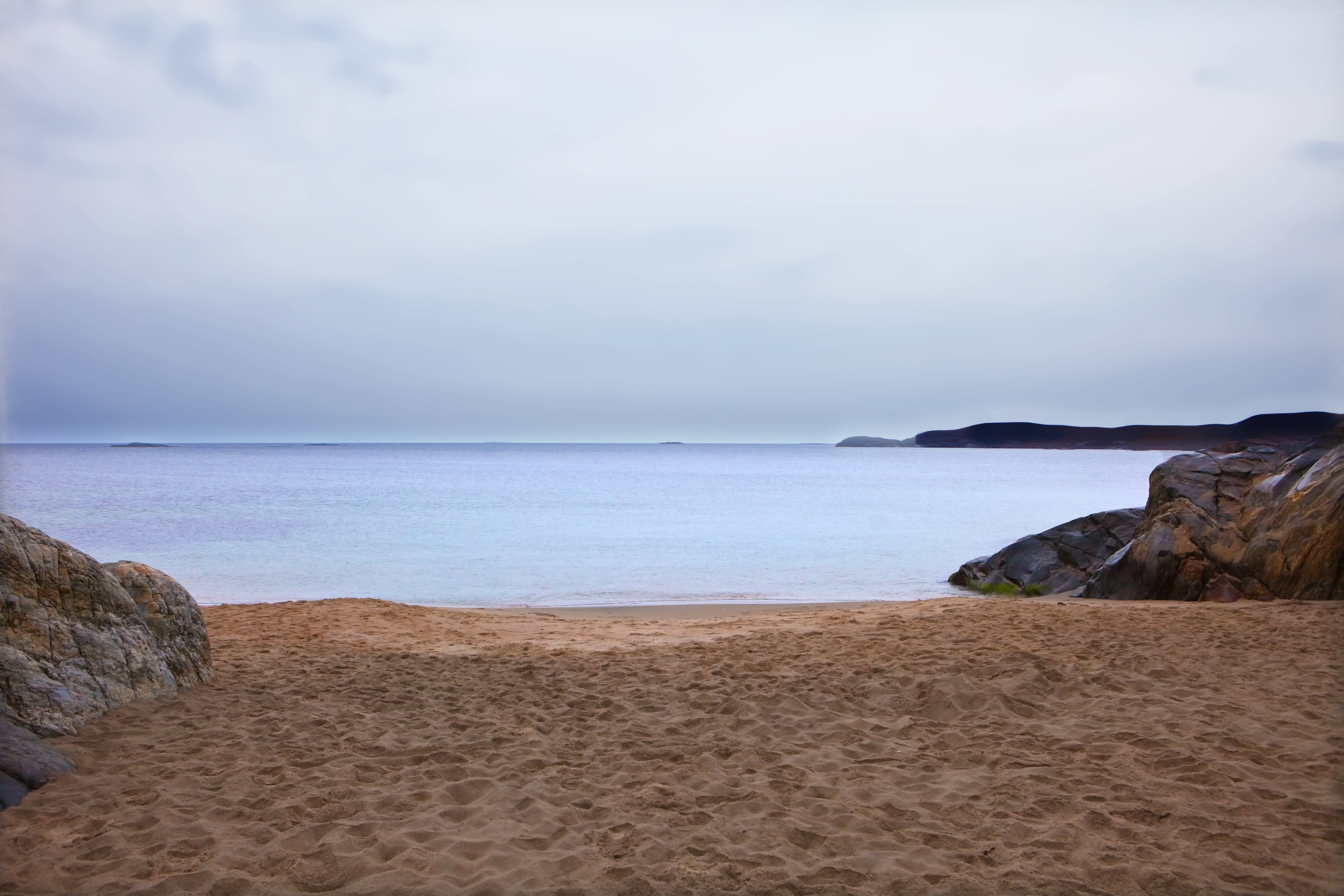
Björnsängen, northernmost beach

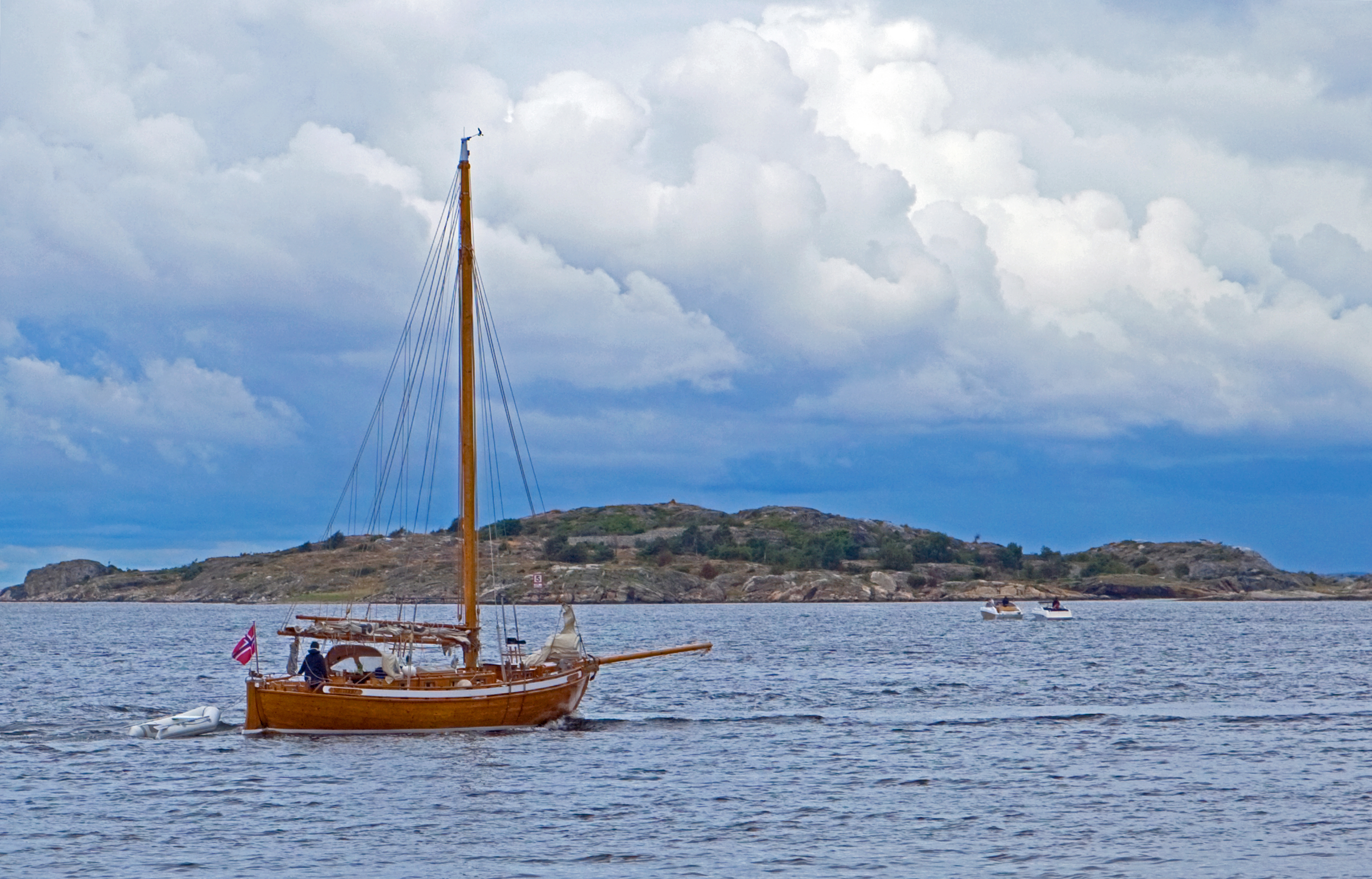
Popular type of motorsailer

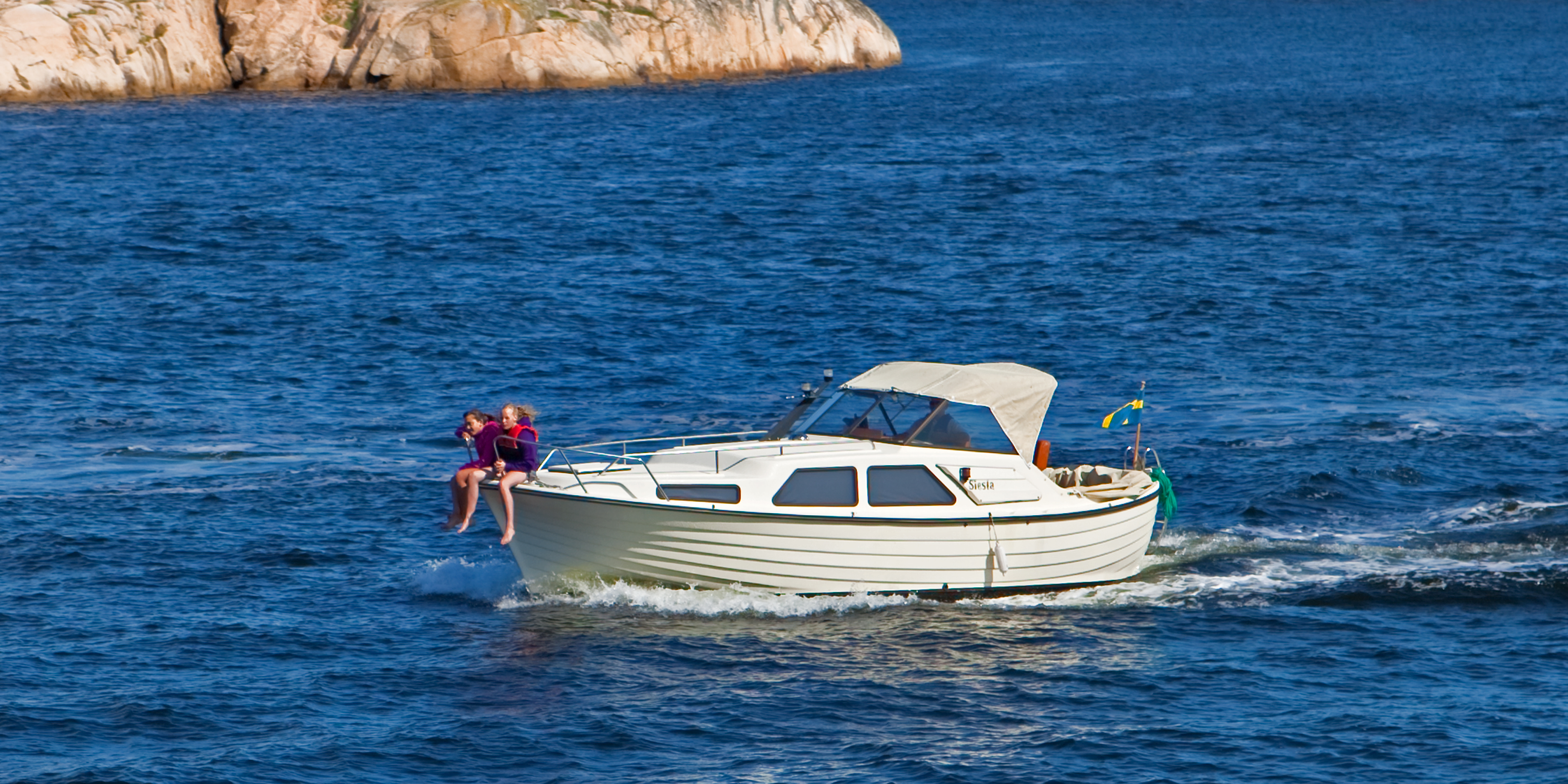
Typical motorboat

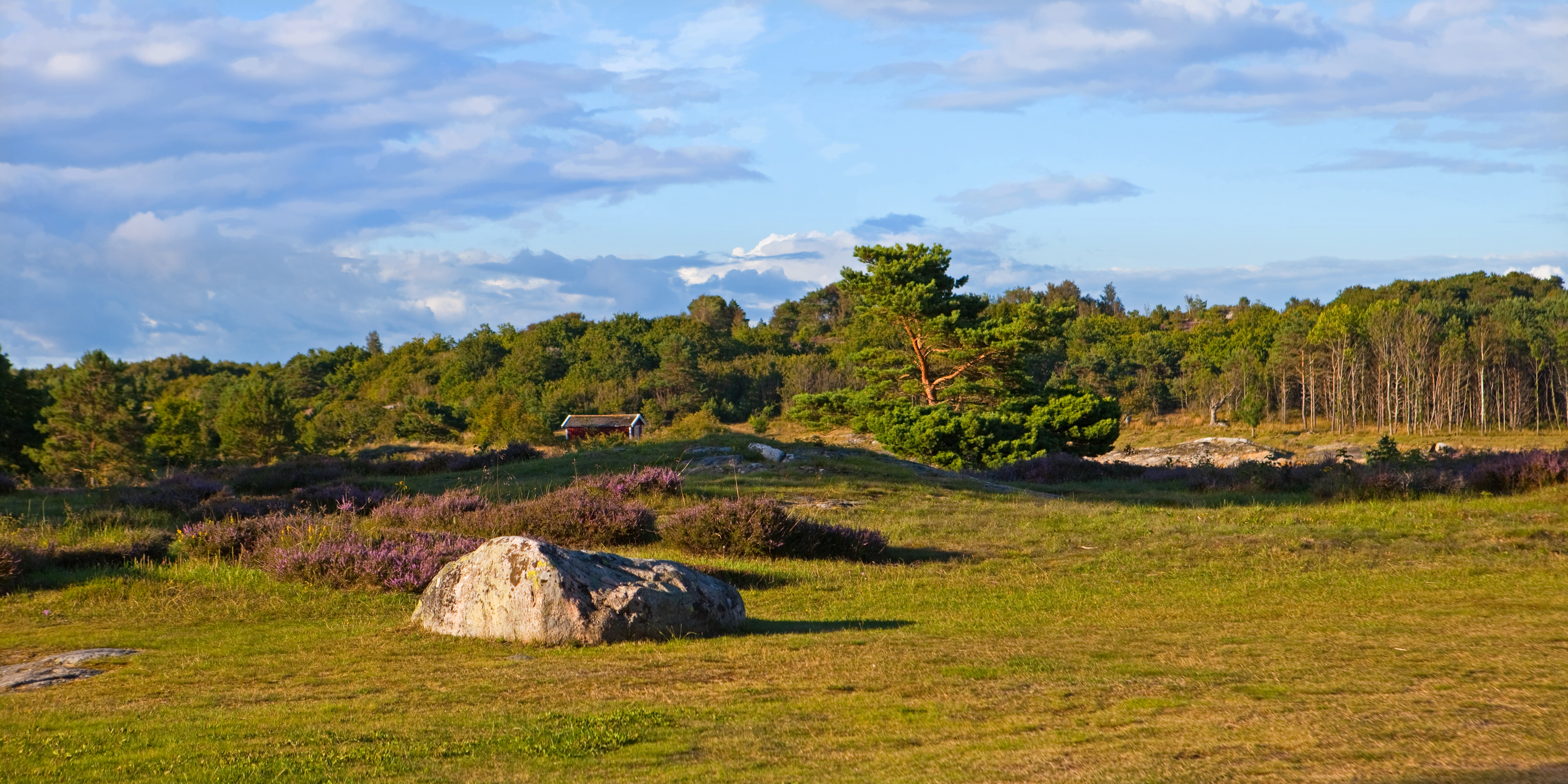
Koster inland terrain

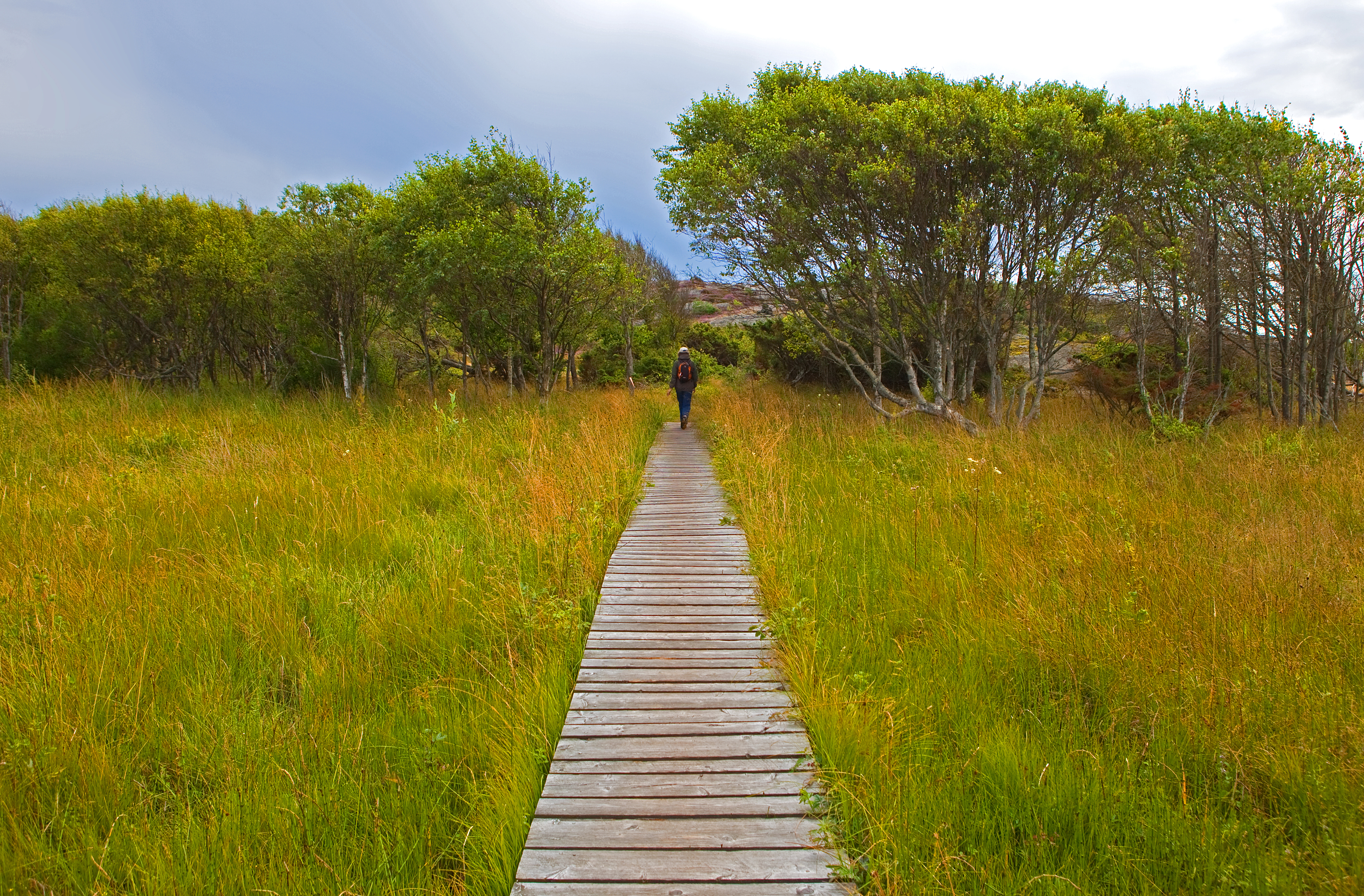
Koster shore terrain

== Additional sources ==
- Kosterbladet 2010
