= Strömstad Municipality =

Municipality in western Sweden

Strömstad Municipality Strömstads kommun
- Municipality
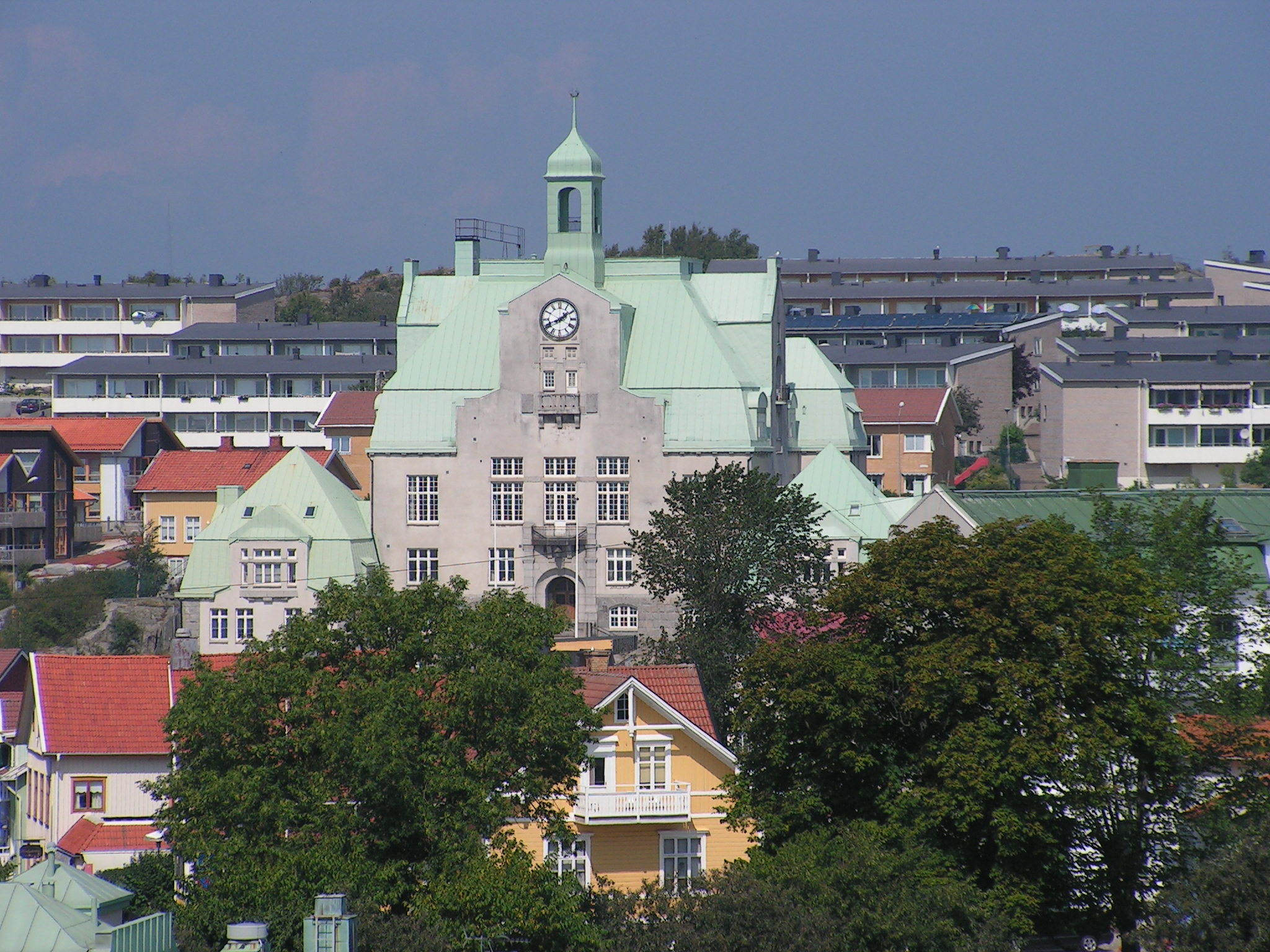
- City Hall of Strömstad

- Coat of arms

- Coordinates: 58°56′N 11°10′E
- Country: Sweden
- County: Västra Götaland County
- Seat: Strömstad

Area
  - Total: 951.83 km^{2} (367.50 sq mi)
  - Land: 467.48 km^{2} (180.50 sq mi)
  - Water: 484.35 km^{2} (187.01 sq mi)
- Area as of 1 January 2014.

Population (30 June 2025)
  - Total: 13,553
  - Density: 28.992/km^{2} (75.088/sq mi)
- Time zone: UTC+1 (CET)
  - Summer (DST): UTC+2 (CEST)
- ISO 3166 code: SE
- Province: Bohuslän
- Municipal code: 1486
- Website: www.stromstad.se

Strömstad Municipality (Swedish: Strömstads kommun) is a municipality in Västra Götaland County in western Sweden. Its seat is located in the city of Strömstad.

The municipality got its present boundaries in 1967, when the City of Strömstad was merged with the two adjacent rural municipalities Tjärnö and Vette. Vette had been created in 1952 out of four older entities.

== Geography ==
Strömstad Municipality is located on the Norwegian border and is known to attract large numbers of shoppers from Norway due to the marked price gap, notably in the tax-burdened alcohol and tobacco, but also groceries such as meat and sugar. There are also many deals on automotive services.

=== Localities ===
- Kebal
- Stare
- Skee
- Strömstad (seat)

== Demographics ==
This is a demographic table based on Strömstad Municipality's electoral districts in the 2022 Swedish general election sourced from SVT's election platform, in turn taken from SCB official statistics.

In total there were 13,248 residents, including 9,106 Swedish citizens of voting age. 41.4% voted for the left coalition and 57.5% for the right coalition. Indicators are in percentage points except population totals and income.

Location	Residents	Citizen adults	Left vote	Right vote	Employed	Swedish parents	Foreign heritage	Income SEK	Degree
Location			%	%					
Bojar	1,732	1,137	43.0	56.0	67	63	37	28,210	34
Centrum N	1,925	1,353	52.9	45.8	67	56	44	21,160	25
Centrum S	1,934	1,388	46.3	52.2	71	73	27	26,454	30
Seläter-Hällestrand	1,327	862	39.3	58.9	66	66	34	29,370	35
Skee-Strömstad Ö	2,051	1,345	36.3	62.3	71	72	28	25,262	25
Strömstad N	1,418	820	46.8	52.1	52	57	43	24,811	25
Strömstad S	1,784	1,333	40.2	58.2	71	71	29	26,444	32
Tjärnö/Koster	1,077	868	49.4	48.5	73	82	18	25,120	46
Source: SVT
