= Rakkestad Airport, Åstorp =

Rakkestad Airport, Åstorp Rakkestad flyplass, Åstorp
- IATA: none; ICAO: ENRK

Summary
- Airport type: Civil
- Owner/Operator: Rakkestad Flyplass AS
- Serves: Rakkestad Municipality, Norway
- Location: Åstorp, Rakkestad, Norway
- Elevation AMSL: 122 m (400 ft)
- Coordinates: 59°23.85′N 011°20.82′E
- Website: enrk.net

Map
- Location within Norway

Runways
Direction	Length		Surface
Direction	m	ft	Surface
15/33	1,080	3,543	Asphalt

Rakkestad Airport, Åstorp (Norwegian: Rakkestad flyplass, Åstorp; ICAO: ENRK) is a private general aviation airport located at Åstorp in Rakkestad Municipality in Østfold county, Norway. It features a 1,080-meter (3,540 ft) runway aligned 15/33. The airport serves a maintenance base of Norrønafly–Rakkestad, the aviation club Rakkestad Flyklubb and the parachuting club Nimbus Fallskjermklubb. The airport is operated by Rakkestad Flyplass AS, which has Rakkestad Municipality as a majority owner.

The airport was built by Norrønafly in 1970. Originally it featured a 600-meter (2,000 ft) grass runway. It has been home to the aviation club since 1972. The airport underwent a major upgrade in 1998 when it received state grants to build a 860-meter (2,820 ft) asphalt runway.

== History ==
Norrønafly was established by Odvar Korsvold in 1953. The airline was based at Oslo Airport, Fornebu, where it both operated charter services and provided maintenance. The proprietor bought the farm at Åstorp in 1970. The company built a 600-meter (2,000 ft) simple grass runway and a 2,000-square-kilometer (770 sq mi) hangar. The latter was used for maintenance of smaller aircraft. Most of the company's operations remained at Fornebu. The operations at Rakkestad were later spun off in a separate company, Norrønafly–Rakkestad AS.

Rakkestad Flyklubb was established during the winter of 1971–72 and bought a Piper Cherokee in April 1972. They built a small wooden hangar next to the runway which they used as their club house. A year later the aircraft was written off in an accident, and replaced with a Piper Challenger. That year the club commenced forest fire scouting services, which provided an important income for the club.

By the 1980s Østfold County Municipality was working with proposals for establishing a civilian airport in Østfold. Although the county was home to Rygge Air Station, Østfold did not house any civilian airports. In 1986 the Civil Aviation Administration recommended that an airport be constructed at Rudskogen in Rakkestad. Widerøe stated that they would consider international flights to Gothenburg and Copenhagen. The plans evolved into a center for aerial and motor sports. Rudskogen Motorsenter was being planned as Eastern Norway's main road racing circuit and would be situated next to the airport. The airport would become the basis for sailplanes, hang gliding and parachuting, in addition to recreational aircraft.

Interest was accelerated following the Oslo Airport location controversy concerning the site of a new airport for Oslo. Should Fornebu be closed, a series of general aviation airport were proposed throughout Eastern Norway. By 1988 Rakkestad Municipality had issued an application to the Ministry of Transport and Communications for permission to build the airport. This proposal called for a 1,400-meter (4,600 ft) runway. The municipality sought financing through a similar means as the airports in Båtsfjord, Geilo, Hasvik and Skien, whereby the municipalities had built the airports themselves and then waited for state compensation.

Because of the location issue for the main airport, all other airport applications were placed on hold by the ministry. One of the main alternatives for a new airport was at Hobøl. Its location would negate the need for a separate regional airport for Østfold. After Gardermoen had been selected as the site for a new main airport in 1992, the government in 1994 launched its proposal for general aviation airports in Eastern Norway. It suggested using Kjeller, Eggemoen and Rygge. The report rejected fourteen sites, including Rakkestad. The proposal was met by resistance at those locations because of their proximity to populated areas and the desire to protect locals from noise pollution. The municipalities of Rakkestad, Notodden and Hamar instead proposed in 1997 that the traffic could be split between three existing airports, Rakkestad Airport, Åstorp; Notodden Airport, Tuven and Hamar Airport, Stafsberg.

The Civil Aviation Administration made a decision in September 1998 that five airports in Eastern Norway would be upgraded for a combined 55 million Norwegian krone: Gardermoen, Kjeller, Notodden, Rakkestad and Tønsberg Airport, Jarlsberg. Using these funds, the airport was significantly upgraded, receiving a longer, asphalt runway. This 860 meters (2,820 ft) runway was extended to 1,080 meters (3,540 ft) in April 2009.

The parachuting club Nimbus Fallskjermklubb moved from Moss Airport, Rygge to Rakkestad Airport in 2011. The reason was that Ryanair established a base at Rygge and wanted to use all the available landing slots. The increased activity and noise pollution resulted in complaints from neighbors.

== Facilities ==
Rakkestad Airport, Åstorp is situated on the grounds of the farm Åstorp in Rakkestad, Norway. It is a private airport owned and operated by Rakkestad Flyplass AS. The company is owned by Rakkestad Municipality (65 percent), Norrønafly–Rakkestad (23 percent), Østfold Energi (4.5 percent) and others.

The airport features a 1,080-by-18-meter (3,543 by 59 ft) asphalt runway aligned 15/33 (roughly north–south). There are several restrictions on the use of the airport. Aircraft may not exceed a maximum take-off weight of 5.7 tonnes (5.6 long tons; 6.3 short tons). Flights are not permitted between 23:00 and 06:00, as well as on Sundays and national holy days. Only visual flight rules are permitted and the runway and tarmac have remote-controlled lighting to allow such rules to be used at night. There are restrictions of flight paths to and from the airport to avoid flying over the village of Rakkestad.

The primary user of the airport is Norrønafly–Rakkestad, which operates a maintenance base at the airport. Rakkestad FLyklubb is an aviation club based at Åstorp. They operate two Piper PA-28 Cherokee and a Cessna 177 Cardinal. Amongst their activities is a flight school. Nimbus Fallskjermklubb is a parachute club based at Åstorp. In 2013 they had about one hundred members and carried out just short of two thousand jumps.
