= Ryggebyen =

Coordinates: 59°22′54″N 10°45′05″E

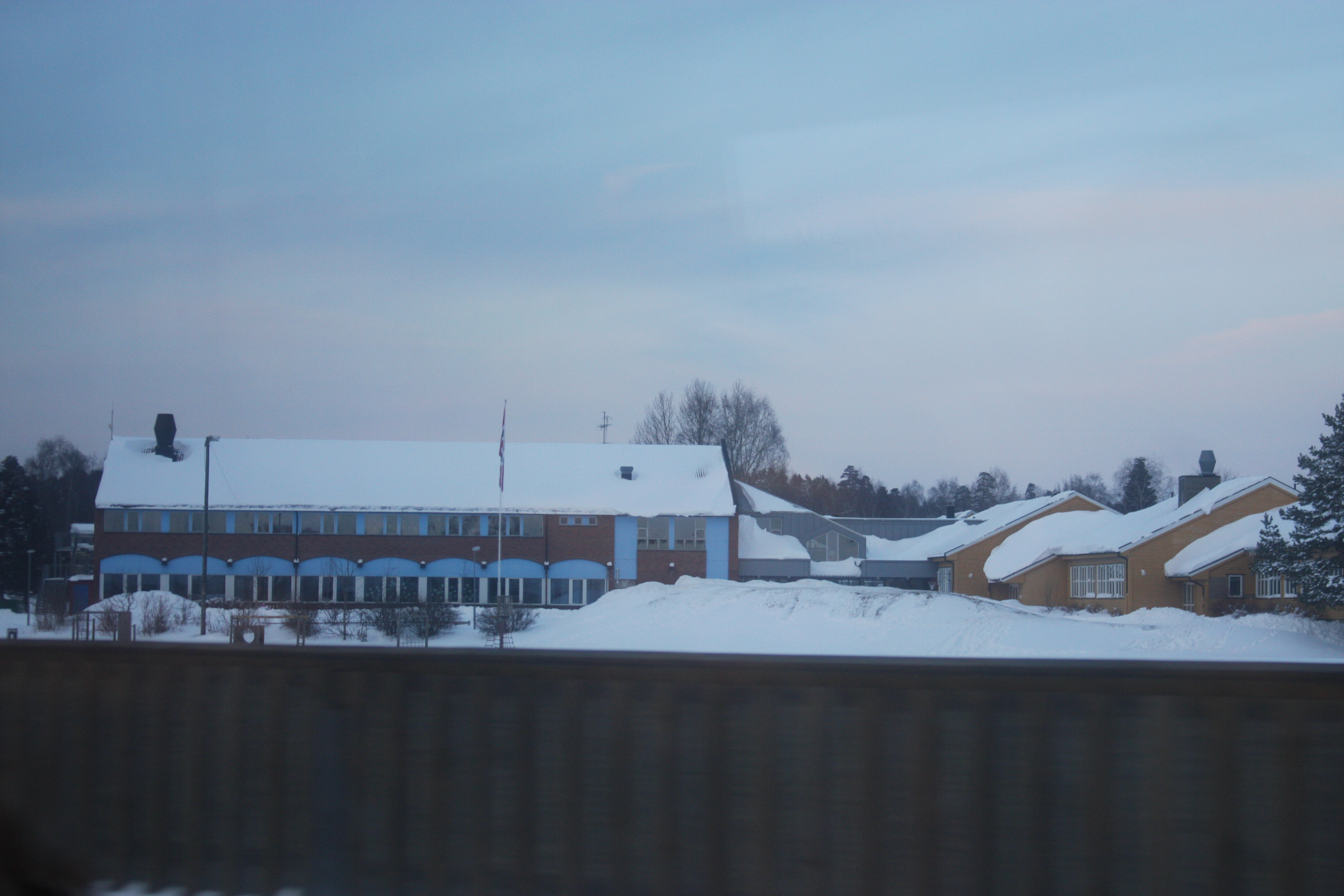
Halmstad School

Halmstad is a village in Rygge, Østfold, Norway. It had a population of 2,283 in 2015, of which 89 were in the neighboring municipality of Råde. Halmstad is situated along a strip with the Østfold Line on the south side and the European Road E6 and Rygge Air Station on the north side. Rygge Station and Moss Airport, Rygge are both situated at Ryggebyen.

== Climate ==
Climate data for Moss Airport, Rygge 1991-2020 (40 m, extremes 1955-2024, sunhrs from Oslo)
Month	Jan	Feb	Mar	Apr	May	Jun	Jul	Aug	Sep	Oct	Nov	Dec	Year
Record high °C (°F)	11.2 (52.2)	13.5 (56.3)	21 (70)	24.9 (76.8)	30 (86)	31.2 (88.2)	33.9 (93.0)	34.2 (93.6)	27 (81)	20 (68)	16.7 (62.1)	13.2 (55.8)	34.2 (93.6)
Mean daily maximum °C (°F)	0.8 (33.4)	1.5 (34.7)	5.1 (41.2)	10.4 (50.7)	15.8 (60.4)	19.3 (66.7)	21.5 (70.7)	20.7 (69.3)	16.3 (61.3)	10.2 (50.4)	5.2 (41.4)	1.9 (35.4)	10.7 (51.3)
Daily mean °C (°F)	−1.7 (28.9)	−1.5 (29.3)	1.3 (34.3)	5.9 (42.6)	11 (52)	14.8 (58.6)	17.2 (63.0)	16.3 (61.3)	12.3 (54.1)	7.2 (45.0)	2.9 (37.2)	−0.6 (30.9)	7.1 (44.8)
Mean daily minimum °C (°F)	−4.5 (23.9)	−4.4 (24.1)	−2.1 (28.2)	1.8 (35.2)	6.4 (43.5)	10.5 (50.9)	13 (55)	12.3 (54.1)	8.7 (47.7)	4.2 (39.6)	0.4 (32.7)	−3.3 (26.1)	3.6 (38.4)
Record low °C (°F)	−27.7 (−17.9)	−31.5 (−24.7)	−28.4 (−19.1)	−11.6 (11.1)	−4.9 (23.2)	−0.3 (31.5)	3.6 (38.5)	0.7 (33.3)	−5.1 (22.8)	−9.7 (14.5)	−19.5 (−3.1)	−26.5 (−15.7)	−31.5 (−24.7)
Average precipitation mm (inches)	67.3 (2.65)	52.6 (2.07)	49.7 (1.96)	50.7 (2.00)	54.6 (2.15)	76.3 (3.00)	76.5 (3.01)	96.8 (3.81)	88.3 (3.48)	110.6 (4.35)	98.3 (3.87)	76.8 (3.02)	898.5 (35.37)
Average precipitation days (≥ 1.0 mm)	11	9	8	8	9	10	12	13	11	12	12	11	126
Mean monthly sunshine hours	45.1	77.6	146.5	182.0	248.0	230.3	244.1	203.8	150.1	94	50.9	40.0	1,712.4
Source 1: eklima.no/met.no (extremes)
Source 2: NOAA
