= Østfold Energi =

Norwegian energy producer

Østfold Energi AS
- Company type: Municipal owned
- Industry: Power
- Founded: 1900
- Headquarters: Sarpsborg, Norway
- Area served: Østfold, Vestland
- Key people: Oddmund Kroken (CEO); Arne Øren (Chairman)
- Revenue: ▲NOK 873 million (2011)
- Operating income: NOK 443 million (2011)
- Net income: NOK 45 million (2011)
- Number of employees: 83
- Website: www.ostfoldenergi.no

Østfold Energi is a Norwegian energy producer within the business areas of hydropower, wind and heat. The company operates hydroelectric power plants in Østfold and Vestland counties with an annual power production of 1,680 terawatt-hours (6,000 PJ) per year. The power plants operated by Østfold Energi include:

- Borgund power plant, 1,013 gigawatt-hours (3,650 TJ) per year
- Stuvane power plant, 165 gigawatt-hours (590 TJ) per year
- Nyset-Steggje power plant, 449 gigawatt-hours (1,620 TJ) per year
- Brekke power plant, 30 gigawatt-hours (110 TJ) per year
- Tistedalsfoss power plant, 13 gigawatt-hours (47 TJ) per year
- Ørje power plant, 9 gigawatt-hours (32 TJ) per year

In 2009 Østfold Energi, together with Nord-Trøndelag Elektrisitetsverk, purchased Siso and Lakshola power plants in Nordland county. Combined production at the power plants totals around 1 TWh. This acquisition brings Østfold Energi’s share of Norway’s total hydropower production to around 1.7 per cent.

Østfold Energi is co-owner of Kvalheim Kraft DA who owns and operates the windmill park Mehuken in Vestland on the west coast of Norway. The wind farm was opened in 2001 with five wind turbines. In 2010 the wind farm was extended with additional eight wind turbines. The annual production of electricity is now 65 gigawatt-hours (230 TJ) per year. The approximately 3,000 households in the northern part of Kinn Municipality are now self-supported with electricity from the wind turbines at Mehuken.

Østfold Energi owns and operates two modern waste-to-energy plants. The plant in Sarpsborg converts waste residue (house refuse and industrial waste) into thermal energy (process steam) to Borregaard. The plant in Rakkestad provides process steam and district heating to nearby industrial companies. Totally 181 gigawatt-hours (650 TJ) per year in thermal energy was produced at the waste-to-energy plants during 2010.

The company also holds ownership of Zephyr (33%), Norsk Grønnkraft (25%), Kvalheim Kraft (33%), Rygge sivile lufthavn (15%) and Hafslund (4.5%).

The company is owned by Østfold county and thirteen municipalities in Østfold county: Østfold County Municipality (45%), Sarpsborg Municipality (15.23%), Indre Østfold Municipality (10.74%), Moss Municipality (7.96%), Halden Municipality (7.67%), Fredrikstad Municipality (5.66%), Våler Municipality (1.52%), Aremark Municipality (1.45%), Marker Municipality (1.49%), Skiptvet Municipality (1.49%), Aurskog-Høland Municipality (1.44%), Rakkestad Municipality (0.14%), Råde Municipality (0.13%), and Hvaler Municipality (0.08%).

In 2011, NIB and the Norwegian energy company Østfold Energi signed a loan totalling 179 million kr (€23 million) for financing investments in wind and hydropower production, and district heating plants.

In 2014, Østfold Energi sold its shares in EfW heat provider, Hafslund ASA. The managing director Oddmund Kroken said, the energy firm will use the cash to invest €30.7m in other renewable energy projects.

In April 2017, Orkla, Thon Holding AS and Østfold Energi have entered into an agreement with the investment company Jotunfjell Partners for the sale of Rygge Sivile Lufthavn AS.

== History ==
The company was created through the 1960s to the 1980s as a merger between the municipal owned power companies throughout Østfold, with only five municipalities not joining. Until 1997 the company was named Østfold Energiverk.

In 2000 49% of the grid and retail subsidiaries were sold to Swedish Sydkraft, and in 2003 Sydkraft took over the distribution, installation and retailing subsidiaries while the power production was left in Østfold Energi. The same year Sydkraft swapped its ownership to Fortum in a business deal.
