= Missingmyr =

Village in Råde Municipality, Norway

Coordinates: 59.3447°N 10.9325°E

Missingmyr is a village in the municipality of Råde, Østfold, Norway. Located between the E6 route and Lake Vansjø, it was classified as a settlement in 2004. It is located between Moss, Fredrikstad, and Sarpsborg, and is close to Oslo. As of 2024, Missingmyr had an estimated population of 992.

== Geography and location ==
Missingmyr is a village, known as a tettsted in Norwegian, in the municipality Råde, located in the Østfold county in Norway. It's a newer residential area, between the E6 route and the most southeastern part of Lake Vansjø, and has been classified as a settlement since 2004. The village is located midway between Moss, Fredrikstad, and Sarpsborg and is a 45-minute drive from Oslo and a couple of hours drive from Gothenburg. Due to its central location and proximity to the E6 route, in 2014, the mayor René Rafshol expressed a desire to expand the business side of the village.

== Demographics ==
As of 2024, Missingmyr had an estimated population of 992 residents, according to Statistics Norway. The village spans an area of 0.9260 square kilometers, resulting in a population density of approximately 1,071 people per square kilometer. Over the four-year period from 2020 to 2024, the population has grown at an average annual rate of 2.6%, reflecting a trend of modest but steady growth.

The gender distribution in the village is slightly weighted toward males, who make up 52.3 percent of the population (519 individuals), while females account for 47.7 percent (473 individuals). The age composition indicates a relatively youthful and working-age-oriented community. Approximately 24.9 percent of the population (247 people) are under the age of 20, while the majority of around 64.3 percent (638 people) fall within the working-age bracket of 20 to 66 years. Seniors aged 67 and older represent 10.8 percent of the population, totaling 107 individuals.
