= Råde Station =

Railway station in Råde, Norway

Råde
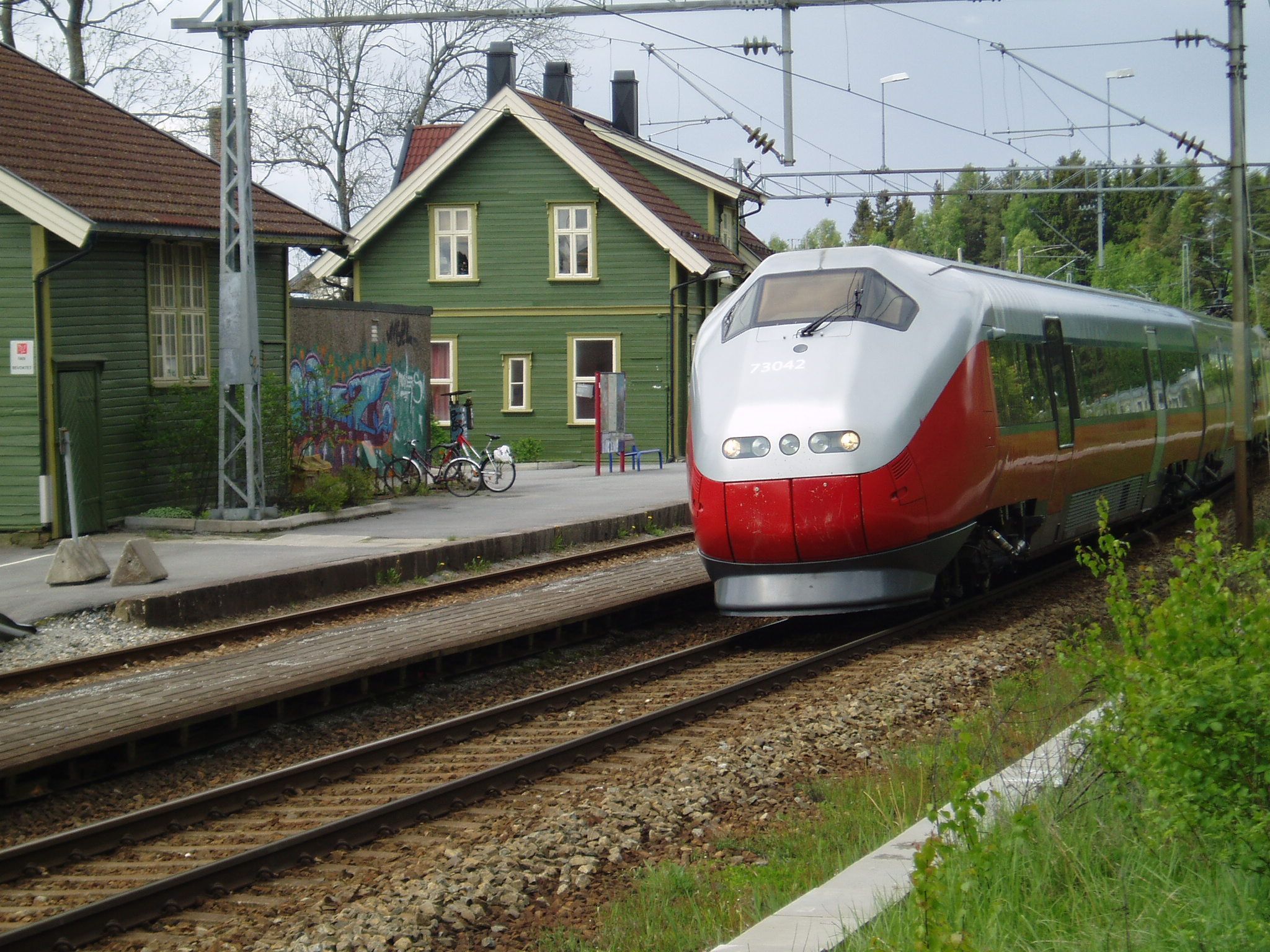
- Råde Station with an NSB BM73b unit

General information
- Location: Karlshus, Råde; Norway
- Coordinates: 59°20′51″N 10°51′55″E
- Elevation: 17.9 m (59 ft)
- Owner: Bane NOR
- Operator: Vy
- Line: Østfold Line
- Distance: 77.01 km
- Platforms: 2

Other information
- Station code: RÅD

History
- Opened: 1879
Location

Råde Station (Norwegian: Råde stasjon) is a located on the Østfold Line railway, located at the village of Karlshus in Råde county, Norway. The station is served by regional trains between Oslo and Halden with hourly headway by Vy.

== History ==
The station was opened in 1879 as part of the Østfold line.

Preceding station	Regional trains	Following station
Rygge towards Oslo S	RE20	Fredrikstad towards Halden or Göteborg C
