= Karlshus =

Village in Råde, Norway

Coordinates: 59°21′08″N 10°51′52″E

Karlshus village is the administrative centre of the Råde municipality, Norway. Its population is 1,952, with 1,073 residents per km2 (2008). Karlshus is located near Moss Airport, Rygge, with European route E6 passing through it, and is served by Råde Station on the Østfold Line.
