= Rygge Station =

Railway station in Rygge, Norway

Rygge
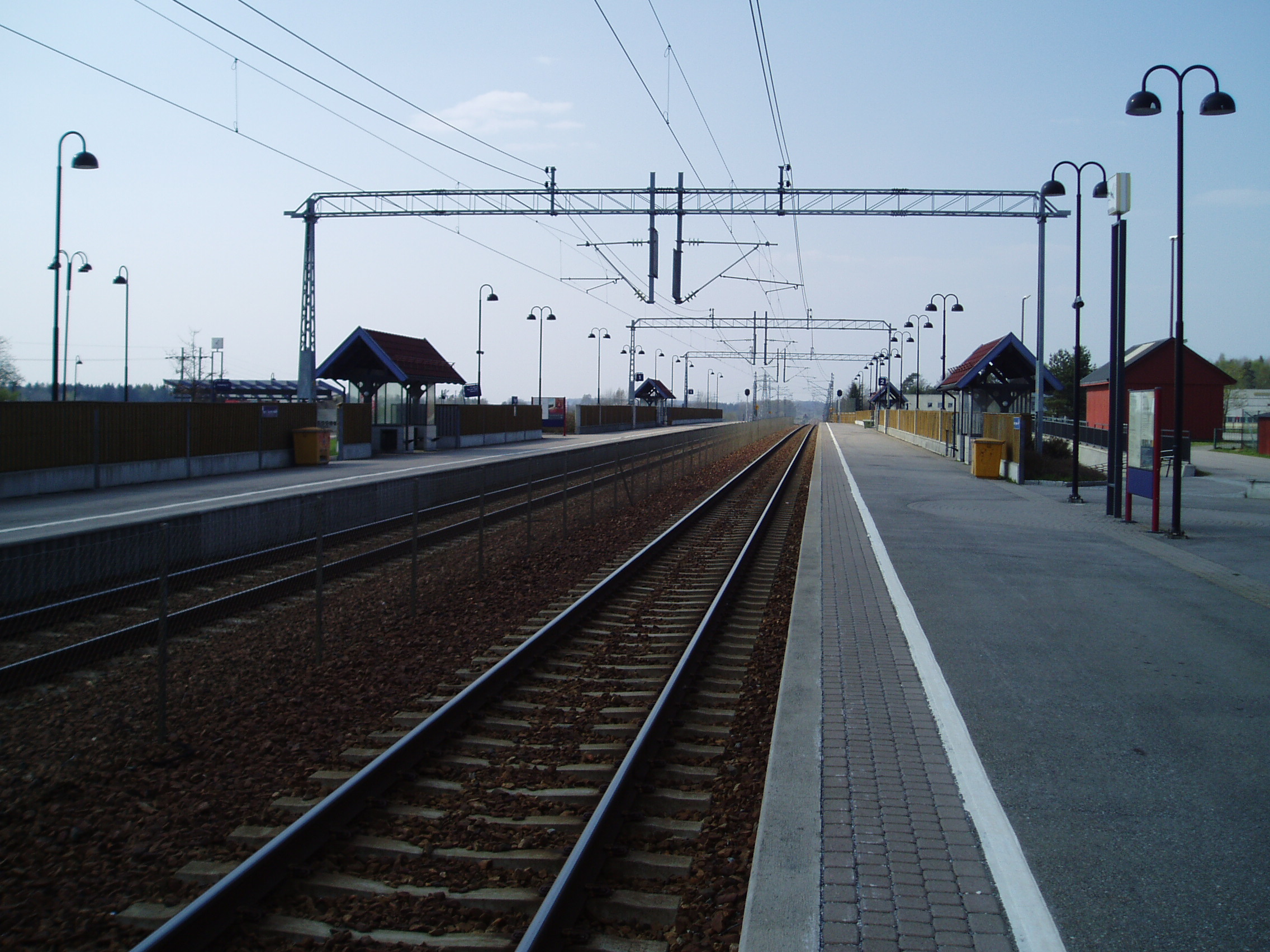

General information
- Location: Ryggebyen, Rygge, Norway
- Coordinates: 59°22′40″N 10°44′53″E
- Elevation: 26.4 m (87 ft) amsl
- Owner: Bane NOR
- Operator: Vy
- Line: Østfold Line
- Distance: 69.28 km (43.05 mi)
- Platforms: 2
- Connections: Moss Airport, Rygge via bus

Other information
- Station code: RYG

History
- Opened: 2 January 1879
Location

Rygge Station (Norwegian: Rygge stasjon) is a railway station on the Østfold Line at Ryggebyen in Rygge, Norway. In addition to serving the village, the station acts as an airport rail link to Moss Airport, Rygge via a free shuttle bus. The station has two platforms and is located on a 7-kilometre (4.3 mi) double track section of the line. It has hourly services by Vy southbound to Halden and northbound to Oslo.

== Service ==
The station is located 69.28 kilometres (43.05 mi) from Oslo Central Station, south of Moss Station and north of Råde Station. It is served by Vy, who operate an hourly regional train service between Oslo and Halden using NSB Class 73 electric multiple units, with an extra departure in the rush hour. Five of the daily services continue onwards south via the Norway/Vänern Line to Gothenburg Central Station. Travel time to Oslo S is 50 minutes, to Halden is 55 minutes, and to Gothenburg C is 3 hours and 3 minutes.

The station has two platforms, one for trains in each direction, with an underpass between them. There is free parking for cars and bicycles, and the station has ticket machines. NSB operates a free shuttle bus to Moss Airport, Rygge, which takes 8 minutes. There is a waiting room in the station building.

== History ==
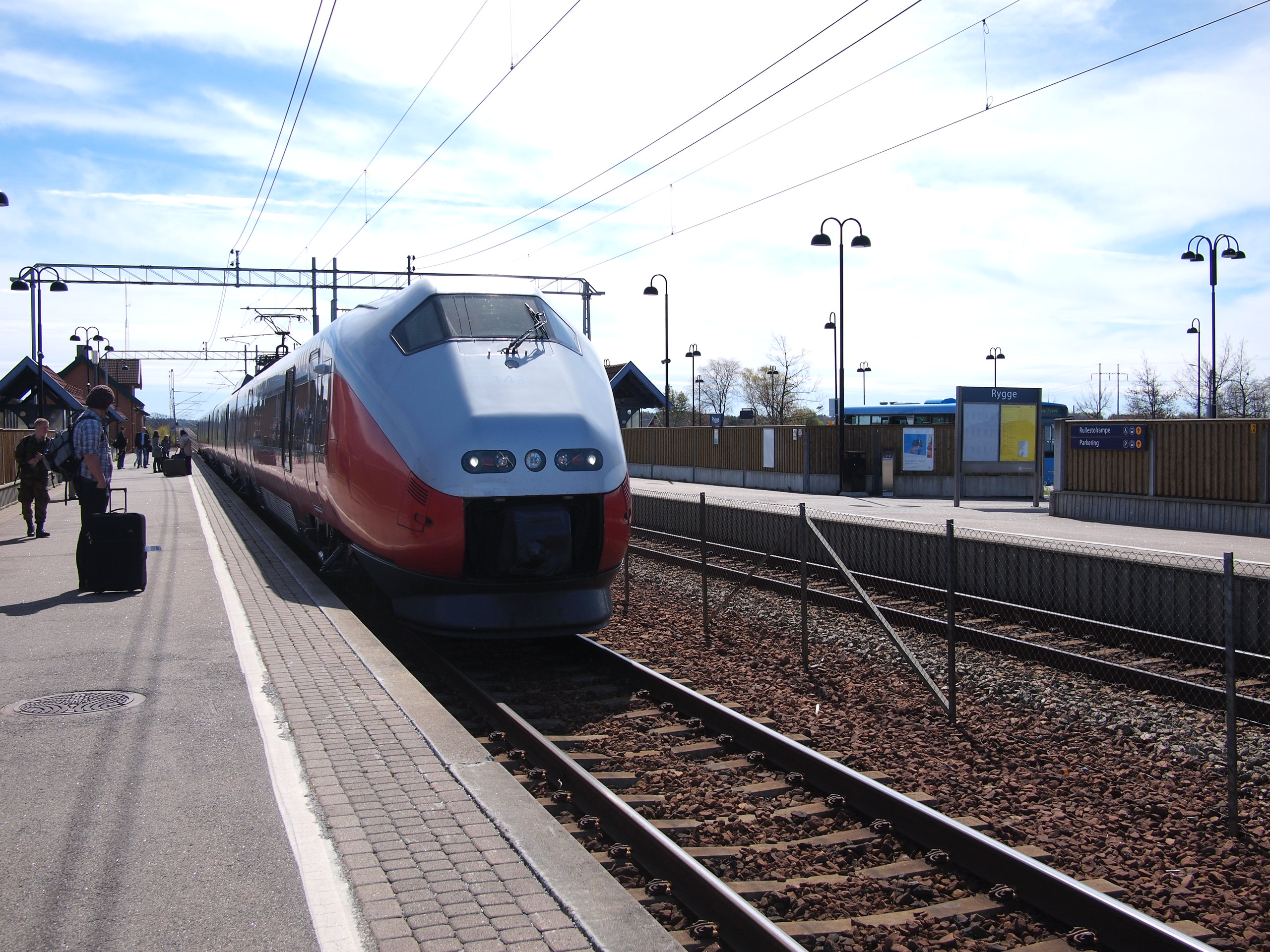
NSB Class 73B train at Rygge

The station was opened on 2 January 1879, as one of the original stations on the Østfold Line. The station building was designed by Peter Andreas Blix. The railway past the station was electrified on 1 May 1940. The station became centrally controlled from 17 December 1973.

Construction of a new 7-kilometre (4.3 mi) double track section of the Østfold Line past Rygge started in 1996. The new section reduced travel time for trains south of Rygge by five to seven minutes, and also allowed better regularity on the line. The section is also free of level crossings, having replaced 21 crossings with bridges or tunnels. The station itself was all-new, and included two platforms, sheds, bicycle parking and lighting. During construction there had been found a 3000-year-old bronze ax. The section cost 490 million Norwegian krone (NOK) and stretches from Såstad in Rygge to Haug in Råde. It was completed one year behind schedule after funding was reduced in 1998. On 28 June 2000, Minister of Transport and Communications Terje Moe Gustavsen opened the section and station. The section past the station received GSM-R on 2 January 2007.

On 14 February 2008, Moss Airport, Rygge opened. To make the station an airport rail link, NSB introduced a free shuttle bus from the station to the airport in connection with all train services that call at Rygge Station. This increased the annual ridership at the station by 100,000. However, neighbors of the station had problems with strangers in the middle of the night asking for directions to the airport. In 2010, the National Rail Administration reopened the station building for waiting passengers, after the waiting room had been closed for 30 years. The estimated cost of keeping the waiting room open is NOK 120,000. The station building is owned by Rom Eiendom, who will rent the building to the National Rail Administration. Rom Eiendom stated that they hoped a café or other customer facility would rent part of the building as well.

Preceding station	Regional trains	Following station
Moss towards Oslo S	RE20	Råde towards Halden or Göteborg C
