= Viken County Municipality =

Viken County Municipality Viken fylkeskommune
- County
- Coat of arms

- Location in Norway
- Coordinates: 59.87°N 10.37°E
- Country: Norway
- Administrative center: Oslo

Government
  - County mayor: Roger Ryberg
- ISO 3166 code: NO-30
- Schools: 58
- Pupils: 40,000
- Transit authority: Brakar, Østfold Kollektivtrafikk, and Ruter
- Roads: 5,353 kilometres (3,326 mi)
- Website: viken.no

Viken County Municipality (Norwegian: Viken fylkeskommune) was the democratically elected regional governing administration of Viken county in Norway. The main responsibilities of the county municipality included the overseeing the county's 21 upper secondary schools, county roadways, public transport, dental care, culture, and cultural heritage. The public transportation in the county was managed by Brakar, Østfold Kollektivtrafikk, and Ruter. Ruter was co-owned with the city of Oslo.

== County government ==
The Viken county council (Norwegian: Fylkestinget) was made up of 87 representatives that were elected every four years. The council essentially acted as a Parliament or legislative body for the county and it met about six times each year. The council was divided into standing committees and an executive board (fylkesutvalg) which met considerably more often. Both the council and executive board were led by the county mayor (fylkesordfører).

=== County council ===
The party breakdown of the council were as follows:

Viken fylkesting 2020–2023
Party name (in Norwegian)	Number of representatives
Labour Party (Arbeiderpartiet)	22
People's Action No to More Road Tolls (Folkeaksjonen nei til mer bompenger)	3
Progress Party (Fremskrittspartiet)	8
Green Party (Miljøpartiet De Grønne)	7
Conservative Party (Høyre)	22
Christian Democratic Party (Kristelig Folkeparti)	2
Pensioners' Party (Pensjonistpartiet)	1
Red Party (Rødt)	3
Centre Party (Senterpartiet)	12
Socialist Left Party (Sosialistisk Venstreparti)	4
Liberal Party (Venstre)	3
Total number of members:	87
