= Ole Haabeth =

Norwegian politician (born 1950)

Ole Haabeth (born 18 September 1950) is a Norwegian politician for the Labour Party.

Haabeth was mayor of Fredrikstad until 2007. Following the 2007 elections, Haabeth became county mayor (fylkesordfører) of Østfold, succeeding party fellow Arne Øren.

Preceded by Arne Øren	County mayor of Østfold; 2007–present	Incumbent
