= Hobølelva =

River in Norway

Coordinates: 59°26′N 10°51′E

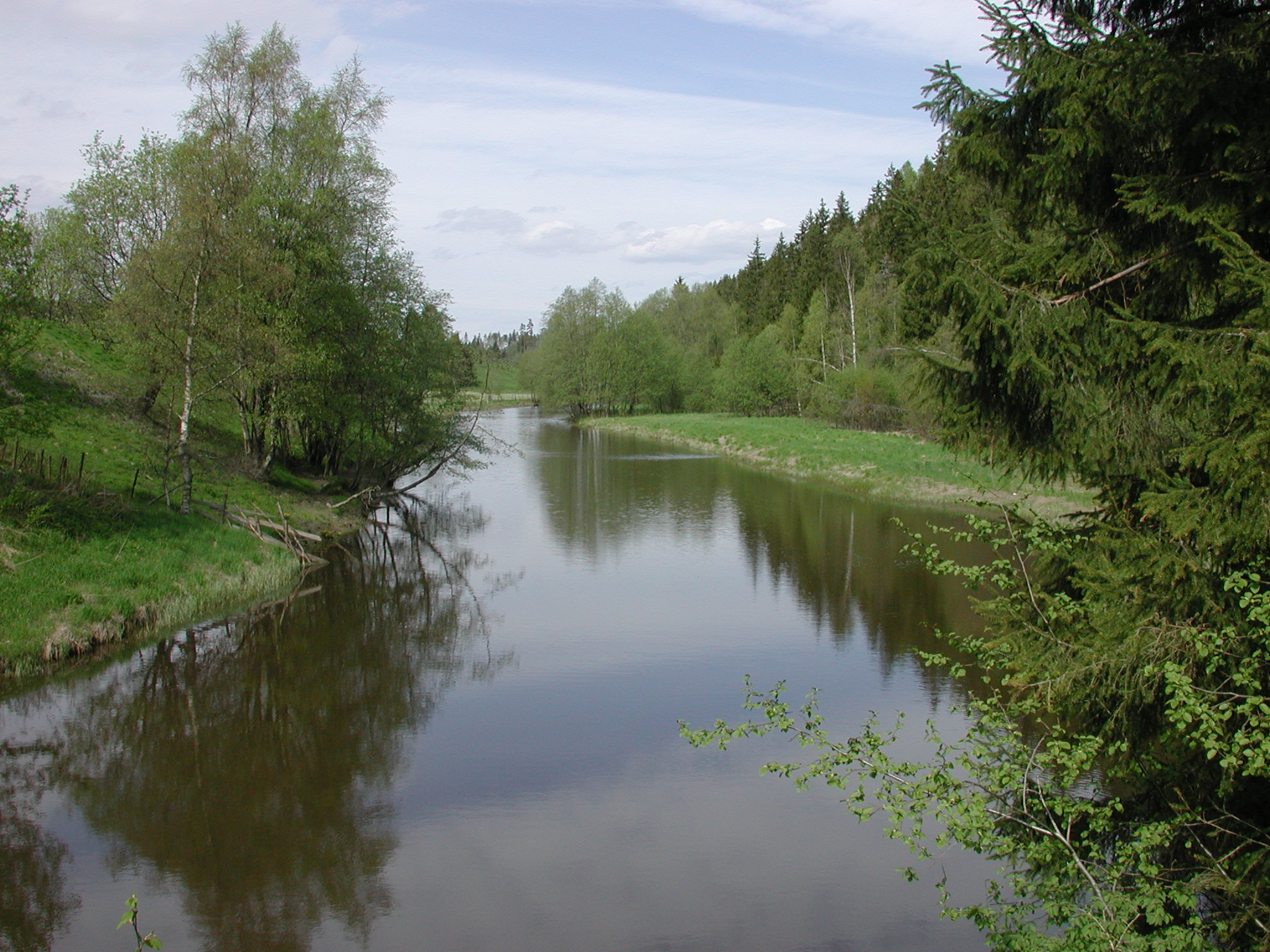
Hobolvassdraget.JPG

Hobølelva is a river rising in Sværsvann in Oslo, until joining Lake Vansjø in Østfold. Hobølelva is the largest of the four tributaries of Vansjø, and flows into Vansjø at an average of 5.4 cubic metres per second (190 cu ft/s).
