= Østfold Kollektivtrafikk =

Agency responsible for public transport in Østfold, Norway

Østfold Kollektivtrafikk is a county agency responsible for administrating public transport in Østfold, Norway. Created on 1 June 2002 and subordinate Østfold county municipality, it is responsible for route planning, purchase of transport from operators, marketing, customer information related to public transport, as well as issuing permits for taxi, bus and truck transport. Train traffic, which is operated by Vy, is not included in the responsibilities of Østfold Kollektivtrafikk.

Bus transport in the county is performed on contract by Vy Buss. Former contractors include BorgBuss, Hansens Bilruter, Lunds Bussruter and Schøyens Bilcentraler.
