= Sværsvann =

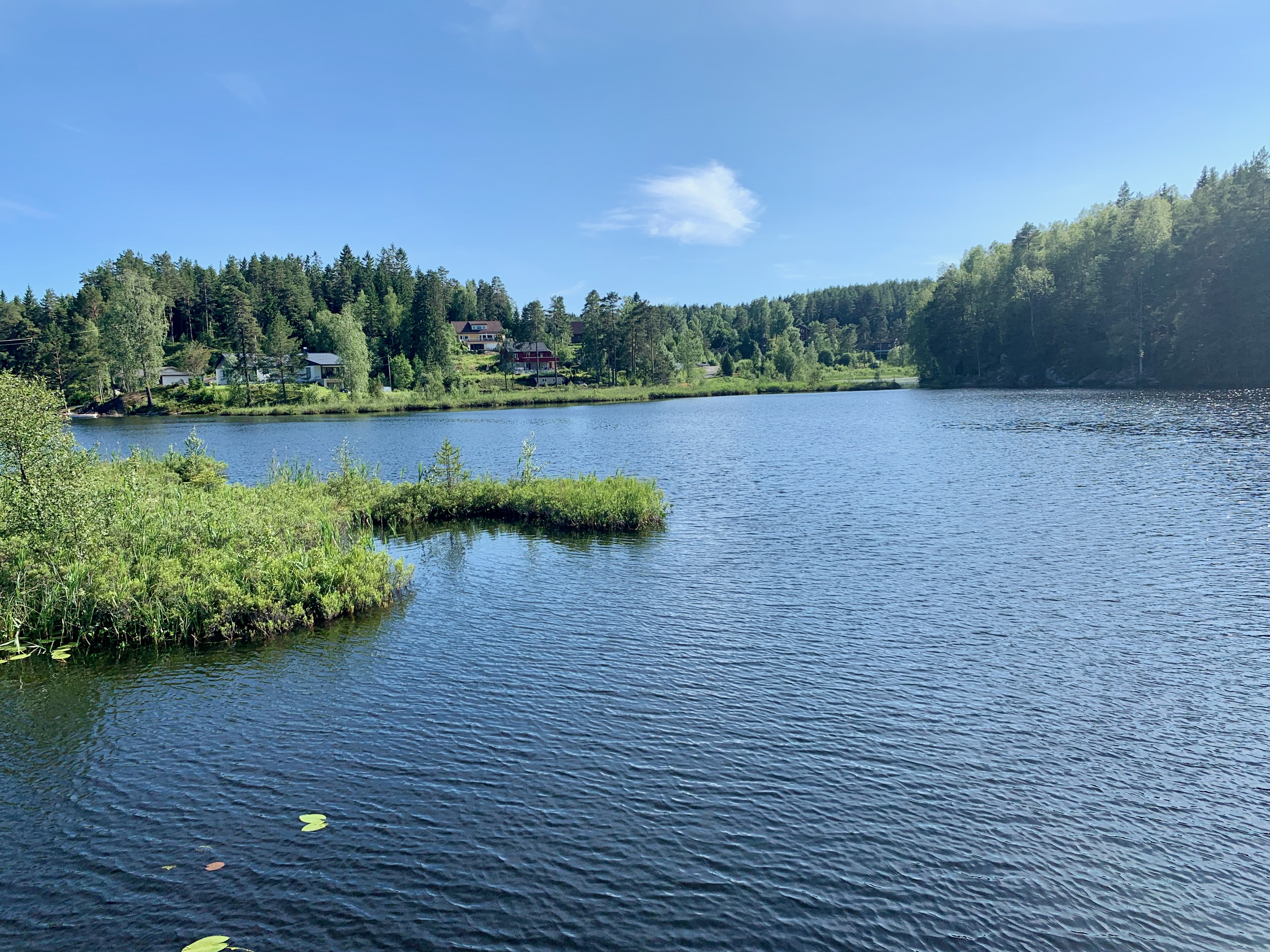

- Location within Norway
- Location: Oslo, Norway
- Coordinates: 59°49′01″N 10°53′23″E
- Type: lake
- Primary outflows: Hobølelva

Sværsvann is a lake in the southeast of Oslo, Norway. The lake drains off into the river Hobølelva. The lake's surrounding areas are mostly residential. Sværsvann is a popular bathing place, and the name is believed to origin from "Sværd Vandet", which means "Sword Water", because a sword was once found at the bottom of the lake. The bottom water contains huge amount of salts, organic nutrition and hydrogen sulfid.
