= Rygge Air Force Base =

Military airport in Østfold, Norway

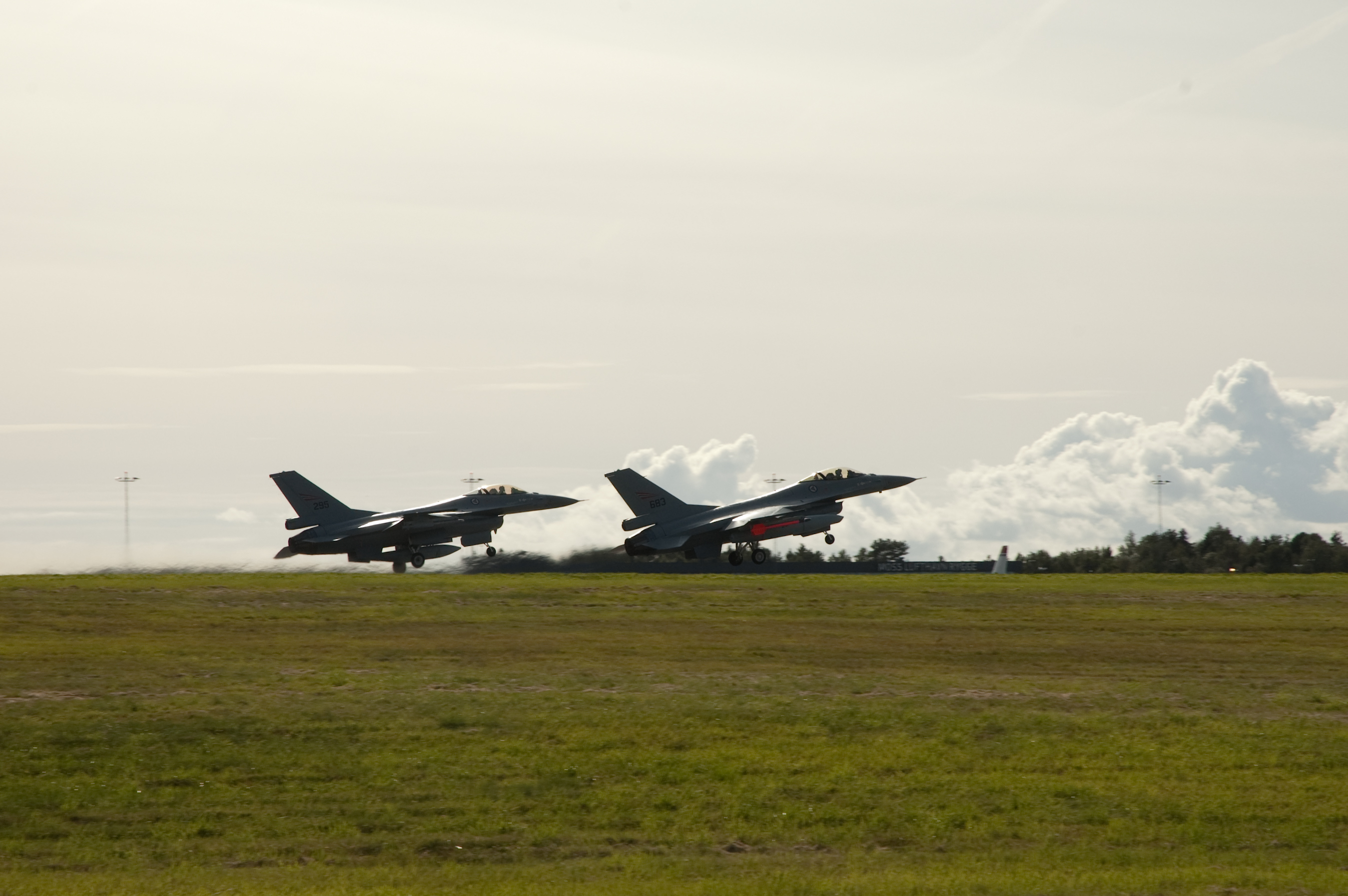
- Two F-16 Fighting Falcons taking off from Rygge
- IATA: RYG; ICAO: ENRY

Summary
- Airport type: Military
- Operator: Royal Norwegian Air Force
- Location: Rygge
- Elevation AMSL: 174 ft / 53 m
- Coordinates: 59°22′44″N 10°47′08″E

Map
- Location in Norway

Runways
Direction	Length		Surface
Direction	ft	m	Surface
12/30	8,012	2,442	Asphalt

Rygge Air Force Base (IATA: RYG, ICAO: ENRY) (Norwegian: Rygge flystasjon) is located in the municipalities of Moss and Råde in Østfold county, Norway. The Royal Norwegian Air Force (RNoAF) operates various squadrons and aircraft at the airbase, including AgustaWestland AW101 SAR Queen and Bell 412 helicopters.

Rygge AFB houses RNoAFs headquarters and staff, Air Force Operations Inspectorate and Air Force Training Inspectorate.

== History ==
720 Squadron was moved from Gardermoen Air Station to Rygge. In 1989 their UH-1B helicopters were replaced with Bell 412s. In 2002, 332 Squadron with F-16 Fighting Falcons was moved from Rygge to Bodø Main Air Station. Some of the aircraft were relocated to Ørland Main Air Station.

On 1 October 2007, the base was expanded to include the civilian Moss Airport, Rygge, which was shut down to all civilian traffic on 1 November 2016. The United States Department of Defense FY19 budget has requested $13.8 million being spent for taxiway construction at Rygge airport to expand operational capabilities as a part of the European Deterrence Initiative.

In 2016, Rygge once again became an air force base under the name Air Force Base Rygge (Norwegian: Luftforsvarets base Rygge).

== Operations ==
339 Special Operations Aviation Squadron's Bell 412SP aircraft used primarily to support the Norwegian Special Operations Command and Norwegian Police Service SWAT units. 717 Squadron operates two Dassault Falcon 20 jets performing electronic-warfare (EW) and EW training. A detachment of 330 Squadron operates AgustaWestland AW101 SAR Queen helicopters for search and rescue.

Other represented units from the Norwegian Armed Forces include the Home Guard, Norwegian Defence Logistics Organization, The Norwegian Defense Estates Agency and Norwegian Cyber Defence Force.
