= Arne Øren =

Norwegian politician

Arne Øren (born 29 December 1943) is a Norwegian politician for the Labour Party.

He graduated from the University of Oslo with a cand.mag. degree in 1968, and later took courses which enabled him to be a teacher. He taught in middle schools in Slemmestad, Spikkestad and Rolvsøy until 1982.

He was elected to the municipal council of Rolvsøy in 1975. He became deputy mayor from 1980 to 1982, and mayor from 1982 to 1991. He remained a council member until Rolvsøy municipality ceased to exist. Øren instead concentrated on the position of county mayor (fylkesordfører) of Østfold, which he became following the 1991 election. He stepped down ahead of the 2007 election.

He is also the chair of Kommunal Landspensjonskasse. He has chaired Østfold Bompengeselskap.

Political offices
| Preceded by Børre Stokke | County mayor of Østfold; 1991–2007 | Succeeded by Ole Haabeth |
