= Vansjø =

Lake in Østfold, Norway

- Location within Østfold
- Location: Moss, Råde, Rygge, Våler (Østfold)
- Coordinates: 59°24′47″N 10°42′43″E
- Basin countries: Norway
- Surface area: 36.94 km^{2} (14.26 sq mi)
- Max. depth: 41 m (135 ft)
- Water volume: 0.264 km^{3} (0.063 cu mi)
- Shore length^{1}: 175.41 km (108.99 mi)
- Surface elevation: 25 m (82 ft)
- References: NVE
- ^{1} Shore length is not a well-defined measure.

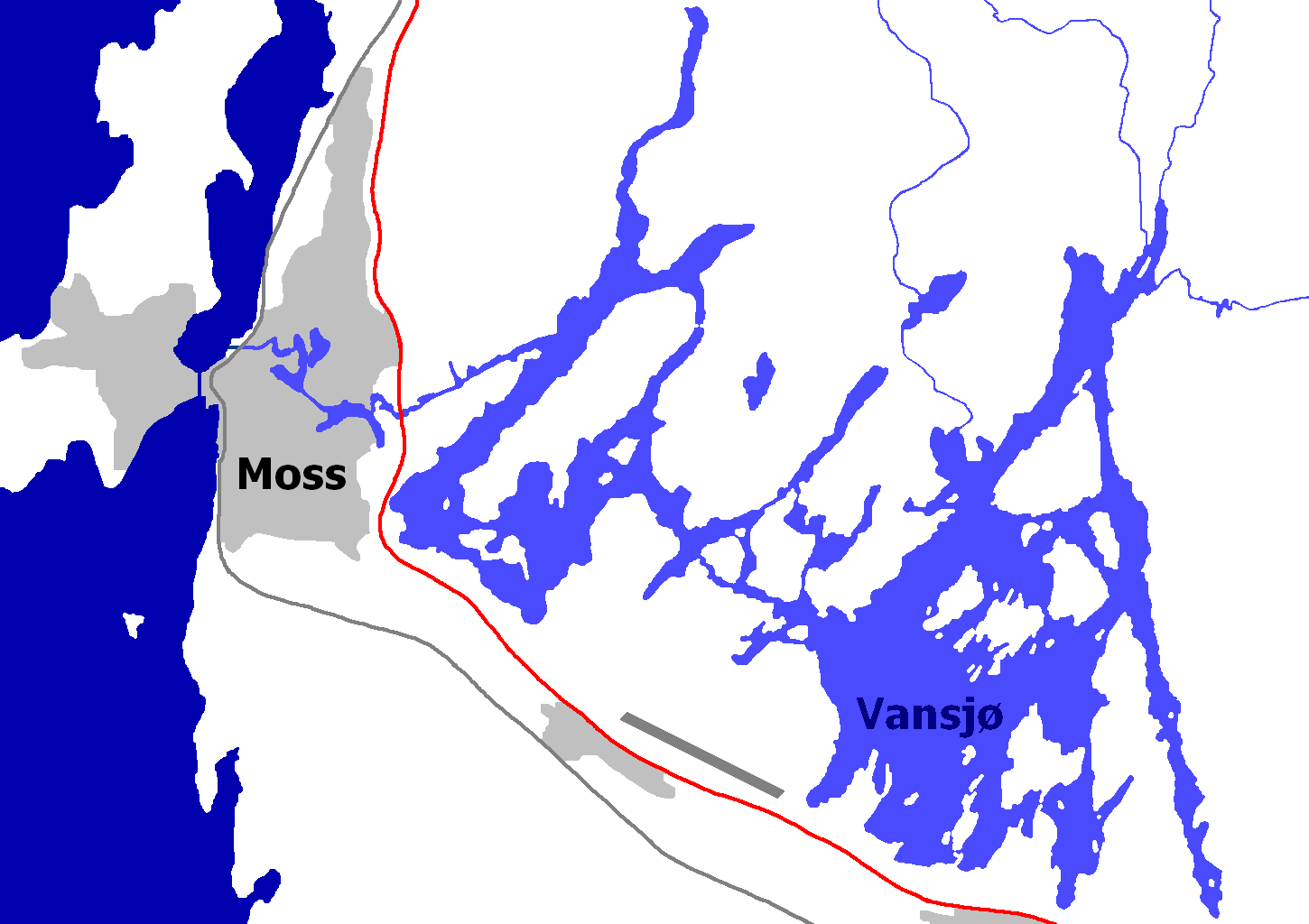
Map of Vansjø

Vansjø is a lake in the municipalities of Moss, Råde, Rygge, Våler in Østfold county, Norway.

Vansjø is part of Moss watershed (Mossevassdraget) stretching from Østmarka. Vansjø has four inflow rivers. The lake is fed by the Hobølelva which drains lake Sværsvann, Veidalselva which originates in Hobøl as well as Svinndalselva and Mørkelva which originate in Våler.

The lake has an area of 36.9 km^{2} and an estimated coastline of about 250 km. Vansjø supplies drinking water in many parts of Moss region.

== Etymology ==
Etymologically the name likely derives from "Varna sjor", the ancient name of the municipality of Rygge.

== See also ==
- List of lakes in Norway
