= Østfold County Municipality =

Østfold County Municipality Østfold fylkeskommune
- County municipality
- Coat of arms

- Location in Norway
- Coordinates: 59°26′07″N 10°39′48″E
- Country: Norway
- Administrative center: Sarpsborg

Government
  - County mayor: Sindre Martinsen-Evje
- ISO 3166 code: NO-01
- Revenue: 2.5 billion kr
- Employees: 2,500
- Schools: 11
- Pupils: 10,000
- Transit authority: Østfold Kollektivtrafikk
- Website: www.ostfoldfk.no

Østfold County Municipality (Norwegian: Østfold fylkeskommune) is the regional governing administration of Østfold county in Norway. The county municipality was established in its most early form on 1 January 1976 when the law was changed to allow elected county councils in Norway. The county municipality was dissolved on 1 January 2020, when Østfold was merged with the neighboring counties of Akershus and Buskerud, creating the new Viken county which is led by the Viken County Municipality. On 1 January 2024, following the dissolution of Viken county, the county municipality of Østfold was re-established. The administrative seat is located in Sarpsborg.

The main responsibilities of the county municipality includes the running of the 11 upper secondary schools with about 10,000 pupils. It manages all the county roadways, public transport, dental care, culture, and cultural heritage sites in the county. Public transport is managed through Østfold Kollektivtrafikk.

== County government ==
The Østfold county council (Norwegian: Fylkestinget) is made up of 43 representatives that are elected every four years. The council essentially acts as a parliament or legislative body for the county and it meets several times each year. The council is divided into standing committees and an executive board (fylkesutvalg) which meets considerably more often. Both the council and executive board are led by the County Mayor (fylkesordfører) who held the executive powers of the county.

=== County mayors ===
- 1976-1979: Oddvar Olsen (Labour Party)
- 1980-1983: Carl Egil Wang (Conservative Party)
- 1984-1987: Oddvar Olsen (Labour Party)
- 1988–1991: Børre Stokke (Conservative Party)
- 1992–2007: Arne Øren (Labour Party)
- 2008-2019: Ole Haabeth (Conservative Party)
- 2023–: Sindre Martinsen-Evje (Labour Party)

=== County council ===
The party breakdown of the council is as follows:

Østfold fylkesting 2023–2027
Party name (in Norwegian)	Number of representatives
Labour Party (Arbeiderpartiet)	11
Progress Party (Fremskrittspartiet)	6
Green Party (Miljøpartiet De Grønne)	2
Conservative Party (Høyre)	11
Industry and Business Party (Industri‑ og Næringspartiet)	1
Christian Democratic Party (Kristelig Folkeparti)	2
Pensioners' Party (Pensjonistpartiet)	1
Red Party (Rødt)	2
Centre Party (Senterpartiet)	3
Socialist Left Party (Sosialistisk Venstreparti)	2
Liberal Party (Venstre)	1
Uavhengig (Arnstein Koch-Engebretsen)	1
Total number of members:	43

Østfold fylkesting 2015–2019
Party name (in Norwegian)	Number of representatives
Labour Party (Arbeiderpartiet)	15
Progress Party (Fremskrittspartiet)	4
Green Party (Miljøpartiet De Grønne)	2
Conservative Party (Høyre)	8
Christian Democratic Party (Kristelig Folkeparti)	2
Centre Party (Senterpartiet)	2
Socialist Left Party (Sosialistisk Venstreparti)	1
Liberal Party (Venstre)	1
Total number of members:	35

Østfold fylkesting 2012–2015
Party name (in Norwegian)	Number of representatives
Labour Party (Arbeiderpartiet)	15
Progress Party (Fremskrittspartiet)	5
Conservative Party (Høyre)	9
Christian Democratic Party (Kristelig Folkeparti)	2
Centre Party (Senterpartiet)	2
Socialist Left Party (Sosialistisk Venstreparti)	1
Liberal Party (Venstre)	1
Total number of members:	35

Østfold fylkesting 2008–2011
Party name (in Norwegian)	Number of representatives
Labour Party (Arbeiderpartiet)	13
Progress Party (Fremskrittspartiet)	8
Conservative Party (Høyre)	6
Christian Democratic Party (Kristelig Folkeparti)	2
Pensioners' Party (Pensjonistpartiet)	1
Centre Party (Senterpartiet)	2
Socialist Left Party (Sosialistisk Venstreparti)	2
Liberal Party (Venstre)	1
Total number of members:	35

Østfold fylkesting 2004–2007
Party name (in Norwegian)	Number of representatives
Labour Party (Arbeiderpartiet)	11
Progress Party (Fremskrittspartiet)	8
Conservative Party (Høyre)	5
Christian Democratic Party (Kristelig Folkeparti)	3
Pensioners' Party (Pensjonistpartiet)	1
Centre Party (Senterpartiet)	3
Socialist Left Party (Sosialistisk Venstreparti)	4
Total number of members:	35

Østfold fylkesting 2000–2003
Party name (in Norwegian)	Number of representatives
Labour Party (Arbeiderpartiet)	13
Progress Party (Fremskrittspartiet)	6
Conservative Party (Høyre)	8
Christian Democratic Party (Kristelig Folkeparti)	6
Pensioners' Party (Pensjonistpartiet)	1
Red Electoral Alliance (Rød Valgallianse)	1
Centre Party (Senterpartiet)	3
Socialist Left Party (Sosialistisk Venstreparti)	3
Liberal Party (Venstre)	2
Total number of members:	43

Østfold fylkesting 1996–1999
Party name (in Norwegian)	Number of representatives
Labour Party (Arbeiderpartiet)	14
Progress Party (Fremskrittspartiet)	6
Conservative Party (Høyre)	8
Christian Democratic Party (Kristelig Folkeparti)	4
Pensioners' Party (Pensjonistpartiet)	1
Red Electoral Alliance (Rød Valgallianse)	1
Centre Party (Senterpartiet)	5
Socialist Left Party (Sosialistisk Venstreparti)	2
Liberal Party (Venstre)	1
Democratic Coalition Party (Det Demokratiske Samlingsparti)	1
Total number of members:	43

Østfold fylkesting 1992–1995
Party name (in Norwegian)	Number of representatives
Labour Party (Arbeiderpartiet)	20
Progress Party (Fremskrittspartiet)	4
Conservative Party (Høyre)	10
Christian Democratic Party (Kristelig Folkeparti)	5
Red Electoral Alliance (Rød Valgallianse)	1
Centre Party (Senterpartiet)	6
Socialist Left Party (Sosialistisk Venstreparti)	6
Liberal Party (Venstre)	1
Total number of members:	53

Østfold fylkesting 1988–1991
Party name (in Norwegian)	Number of representatives
Labour Party (Arbeiderpartiet)	23
Progress Party (Fremskrittspartiet)	5
Conservative Party (Høyre)	11
Christian Democratic Party (Kristelig Folkeparti)	5
Red Electoral Alliance (Rød Valgallianse)	1
Centre Party (Senterpartiet)	4
Socialist Left Party (Sosialistisk Venstreparti)	2
Liberal Party (Venstre)	2
Total number of members:	53

Østfold fylkesting 1984–1987
Party name (in Norwegian)	Number of representatives
Labour Party (Arbeiderpartiet)	26
Progress Party (Fremskrittspartiet)	3
Conservative Party (Høyre)	13
Christian Democratic Party (Kristelig Folkeparti)	5
Centre Party (Senterpartiet)	3
Socialist Left Party (Sosialistisk Venstreparti)	2
Liberal Party (Venstre)	1
Total number of members:	53

Østfold fylkesting 1980–1983
Party name (in Norwegian)	Number of representatives
Labour Party (Arbeiderpartiet)	24
Progress Party (Fremskrittspartiet)	1
Conservative Party (Høyre)	14
Christian Democratic Party (Kristelig Folkeparti)	6
Centre Party (Senterpartiet)	4
Socialist Left Party (Sosialistisk Venstreparti)	2
Liberal Party (Venstre)	2
Total number of members:	53

Østfold fylkesting 1976–1979
Party name (in Norwegian)	Number of representatives
Labour Party (Arbeiderpartiet)	25
Conservative Party (Høyre)	11
Christian Democratic Party (Kristelig Folkeparti)	7
New People's Party (Nye Folkepartiet)	1
Centre Party (Senterpartiet)	5
Socialist Left Party (Sosialistisk Venstreparti)	3
Liberal Party (Venstre)	1
Total number of members:	53
