= Moss Airport, Rygge =

Former commercial airport in Moss, Østfold, Norway (2007–2016)

Moss Airport, Rygge Moss lufthavn, Rygge
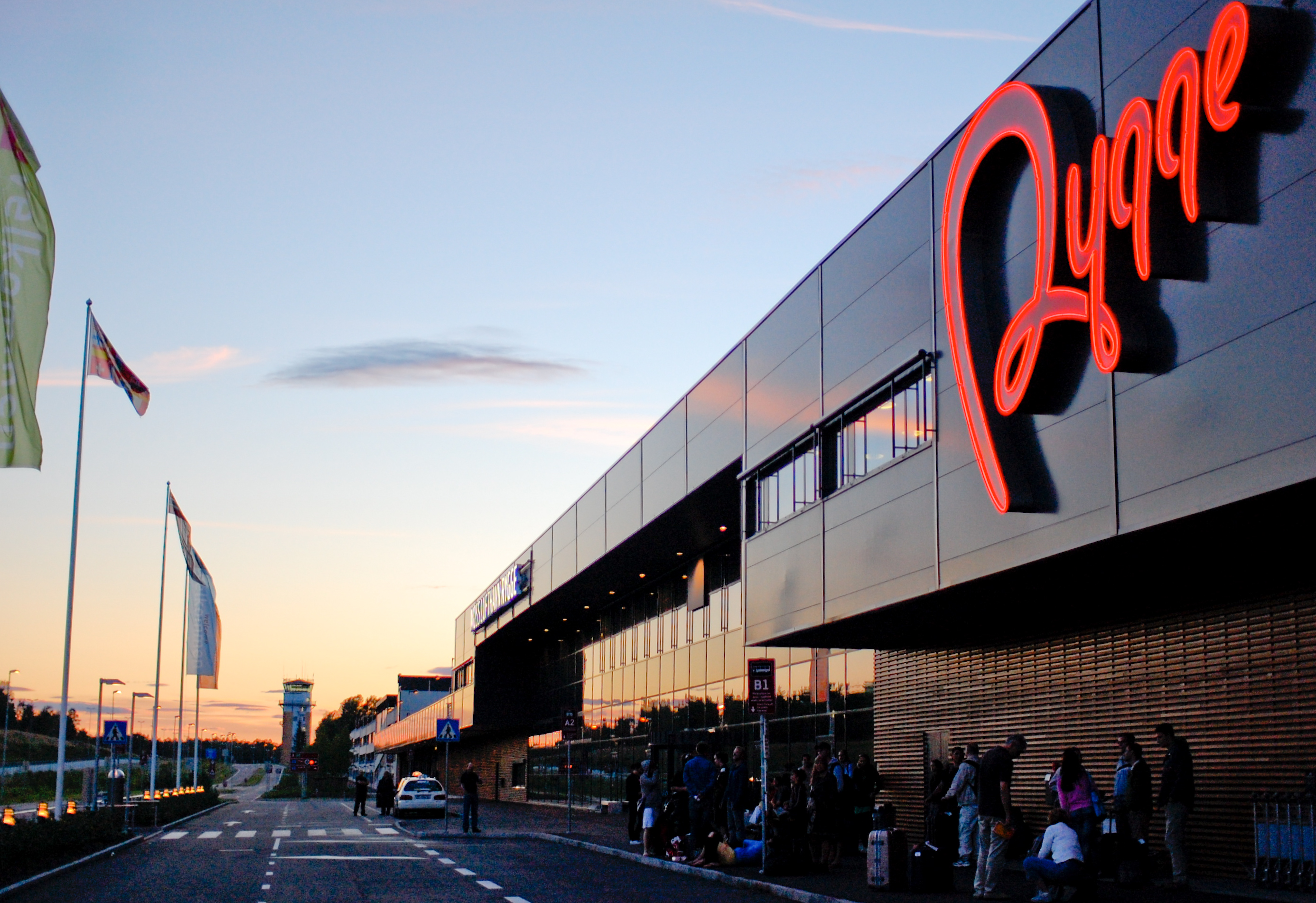
- IATA: RYG; ICAO: ENRY

Summary
- Airport type: Joint (public and military)
- Owner: Royal Norwegian Air Force
- Operator: Rygge Sivile Lufthavn AS
- Serves: Moss; Greater Oslo Region; Eastern Norway
- Location: Moss, Østfold, Norway
- Opened: 8 October 2007
- Passenger services ceased: 1 November 2016
- Elevation AMSL: 53 m / 173 ft
- Coordinates: 59°22′44″N 010°47′08″E
- Website: www.ryg.no

Map

Runways
| Direction | Length | | Surface |
| Direction | m | ft | Surface |
|---|---|---|---|
| 12/30 | 2,442 | 8,012 | Asphalt |

Statistics (2016)
- Passengers: 1,304,379
- Aircraft movements: 22,056
- Cargo (tonnes): 5
- Source: Norwegian AIP at Avinor; Statistics from Avinor

Moss Airport, Rygge (IATA: RYG, ICAO: ENRY) was a minor international airport serving Moss, Oslo and Eastern Norway. It was located in Rygge in Moss Municipality, 10 km (6.2 mi) outside Moss and 60 km (37 mi) outside Oslo. It also served as a regional airport for Østfold county and owned and was operated by the private company Rygge Sivile Lufthavn AS.

Moss/Rygge shut down to all civilian traffic on 1 November 2016. The airport is however co-located with the still operational Rygge Air Force Base, operated by the Royal Norwegian Air Force, which also owns the land and runway. The control tower services (air traffic control) are operated by Avinor.

The airport opened on 8 October 2007, but did not officially open until 14 February 2008, when regular scheduled services started. The airport has a capacity for 2 million passengers per year, but could not reach this because of a concession limit of 21,000 annual air movements. The airport handled 1,890,889 passengers in 2013. The airport used to be a major base for Ryanair from March 2010 until its closure to civilian traffic at the end of October 2016 and was also served, to a much lesser extent, by Norwegian Air Shuttle and a few charter operators. The airport has been closed to all civilian traffic since 1 November 2016 due to a proposal from its main commercial operator, Ryanair, to shut down its base at the airport on that date after a new Norwegian passenger tax was introduced.

There were plans to reopen the airport in 2021, but these never materialised.

In 2021 the airport was used as a COVID-19 test and vaccine center.

== History ==
=== Early years ===
The first aerodrome at Rygge was built in 1942 and 1943, but was located about 2 kilometers (1.2 mi) west from the current runway. The aerodrome was closed in 1945, but reopened in 1949 as a military aviation school, although the school only remained for two years. In 1952 it was decided that Rygge was to become a military air station which met NATO specifications. This included the expropriation of 600 hectares (1,500 acres) of land, costing NOK 12 million. The new Rygge Main Air Station was established on 15 September 1954, after investments of NOK 127 million. The old airport was closed and remained a camp until it was closed in 2003. Rygge Main Air Station hosted the 332 Squadron, and later the 336 Squadron and the 720 Squadron 330 Squadron. From 2003, the fighter jets were moved from Rygge to Bodø Main Air Station.

=== The airport during the 1990s ===
On 8 October 1998, Oslo Airport, Gardermoen took over the role as the main airport serving Oslo and Eastern Norway from Oslo Airport, Fornebu. Several other locations, including Hurum, Hobøl and Ås, had been considered, all which were located closer to Oslo and the Oslofjord area. The choice of location was controversial, in part because Gardermoen would be located further than Fornebu from among other things Østfold and Follo. In 1998, a report was made by SCC Trafikon which concluded that by building a civilian section at Rygge Air Station, it would be possible to generate 130,000 passengers per year, of which 40,000 would be charter travels. This was a higher passenger potential than Torp. Several regional airlines, such as Teddy Air, Air Stord and Coast Air, all stated that they could be interested in routes from Rygge, while Scandinavian Airlines, Braathens and Widerøe stated that they were not interested in flying from the airport. The idea was initially supported by local parliamentarians, Østfold County Council and the Confederation of Norwegian Enterprise. The latter stated that the most important air routes were those to Gardermoen and Torp, while the Trafikon report recommended routes to Bergen, Stavanger, Trondheim and Copenhagen.

In February 1999, Minister of Transport and Communications Dag Jostein Fjærvoll stated that he supported the opening of civilian traffic from Rygge. Estimates from then were for an investment of 80 million Norwegian krone for a capacity of 150,000 annual passengers. However, the plans allowed for further expansion to 500,000 annual passengers. In July, the operating company Rygge Sivile Lufthavn was established. Owners were Borregaard (46.7%), Østfold County Municipality (20%), M. Peterson & Søn (16.6%) and Capricorn Invest (16.6%). The share capital was initially NOK 3 million. Egil Ullebø was appointed the company's chair. According to the plans, the company would need NOK 50 million in share capital, and the Norwegian Civil Airport Administration was intended to own 34% of the airport.

=== Development since 2000 ===
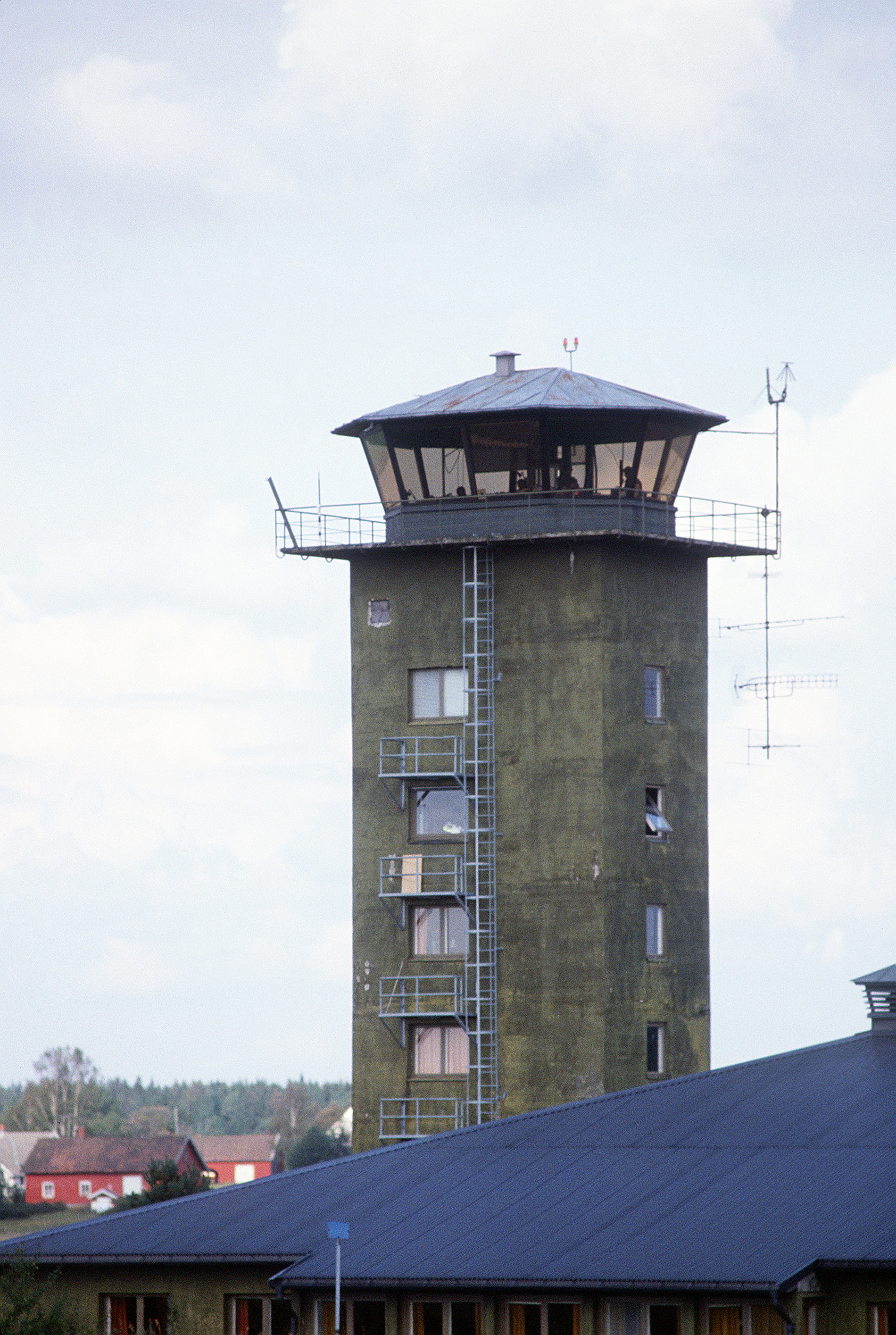
The control tower at Rygge in 1983

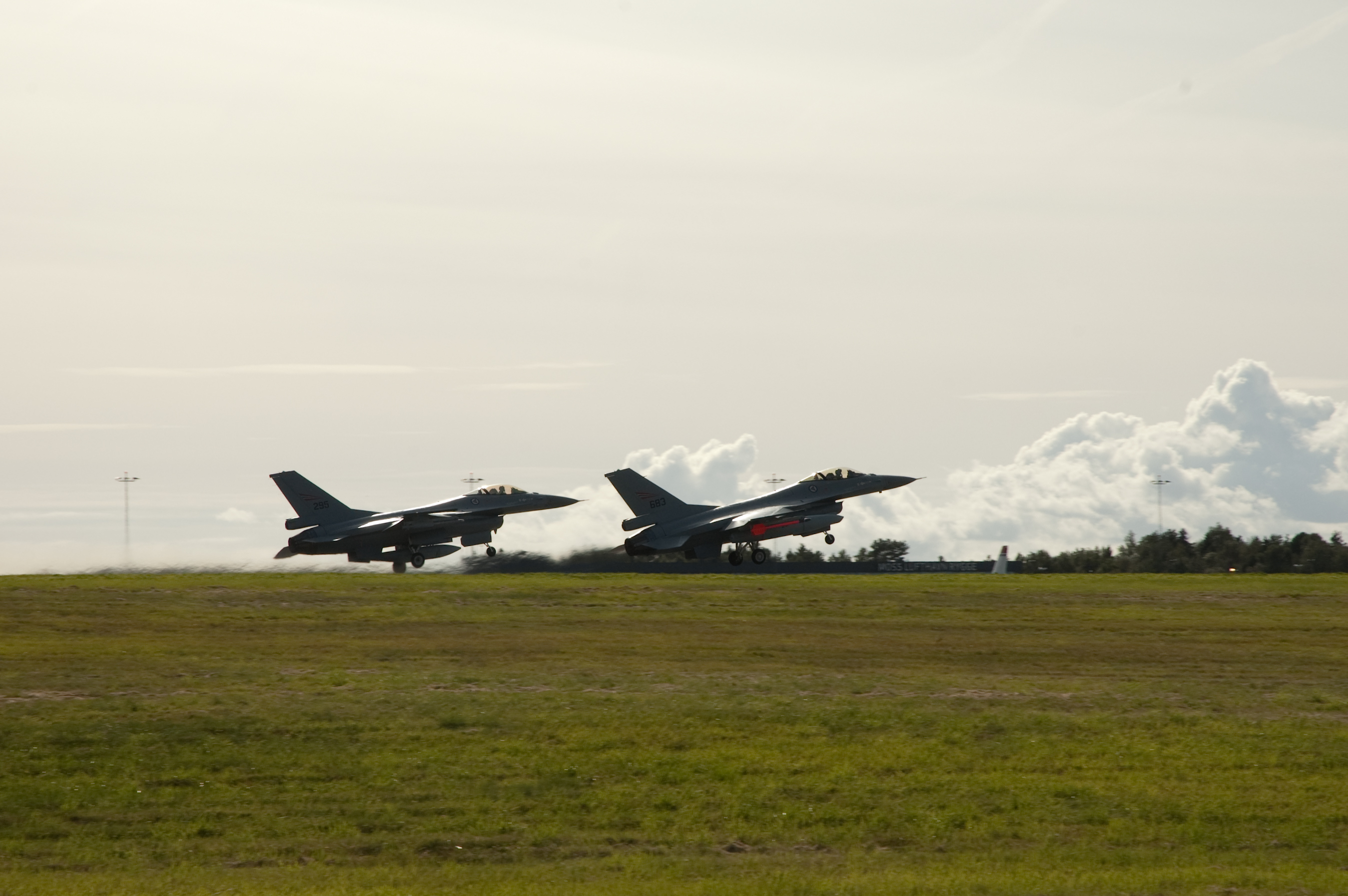
Two General Dynamics F-16 Fighting Falcons taking off from Rygge

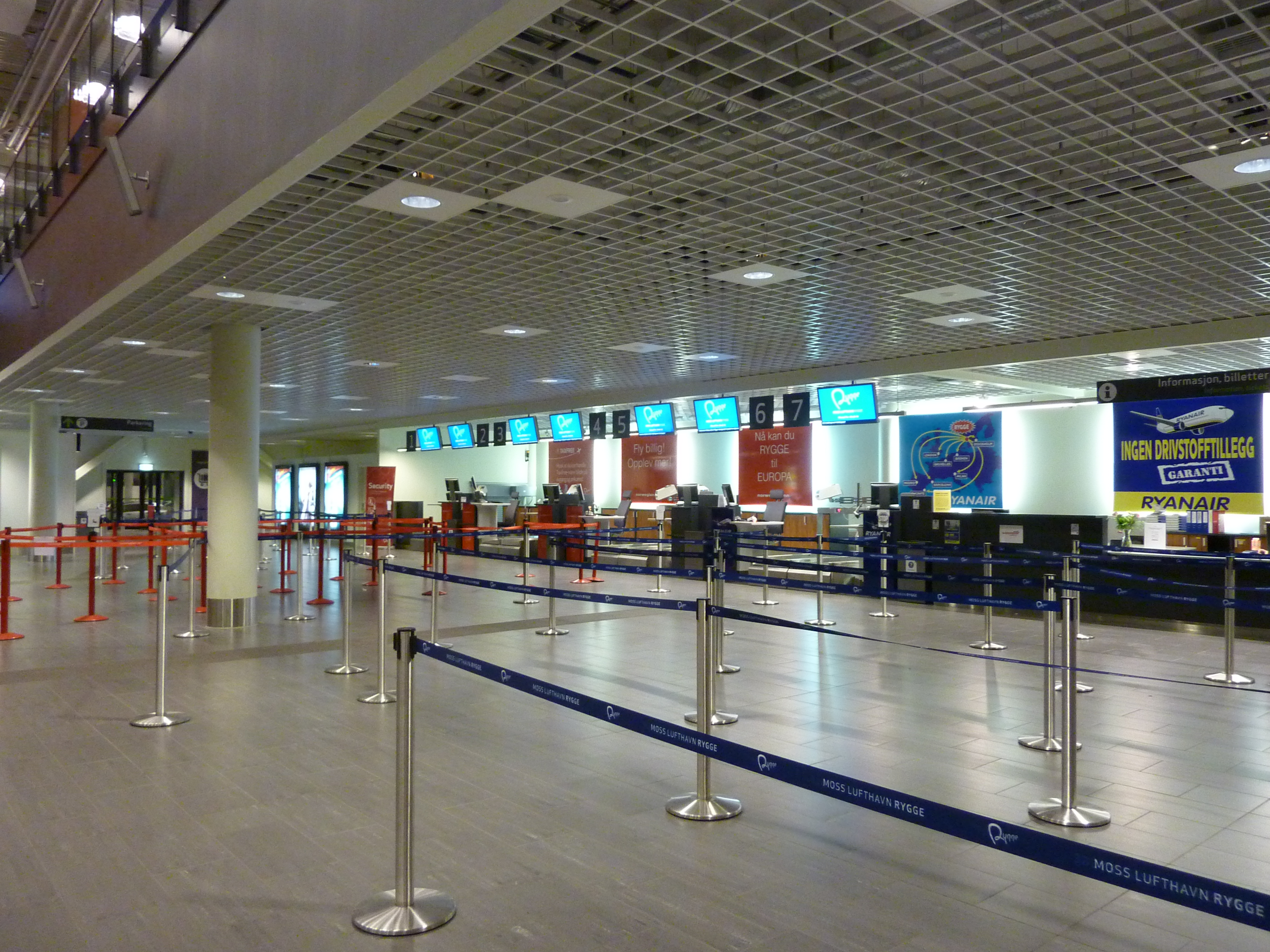
Check-in area

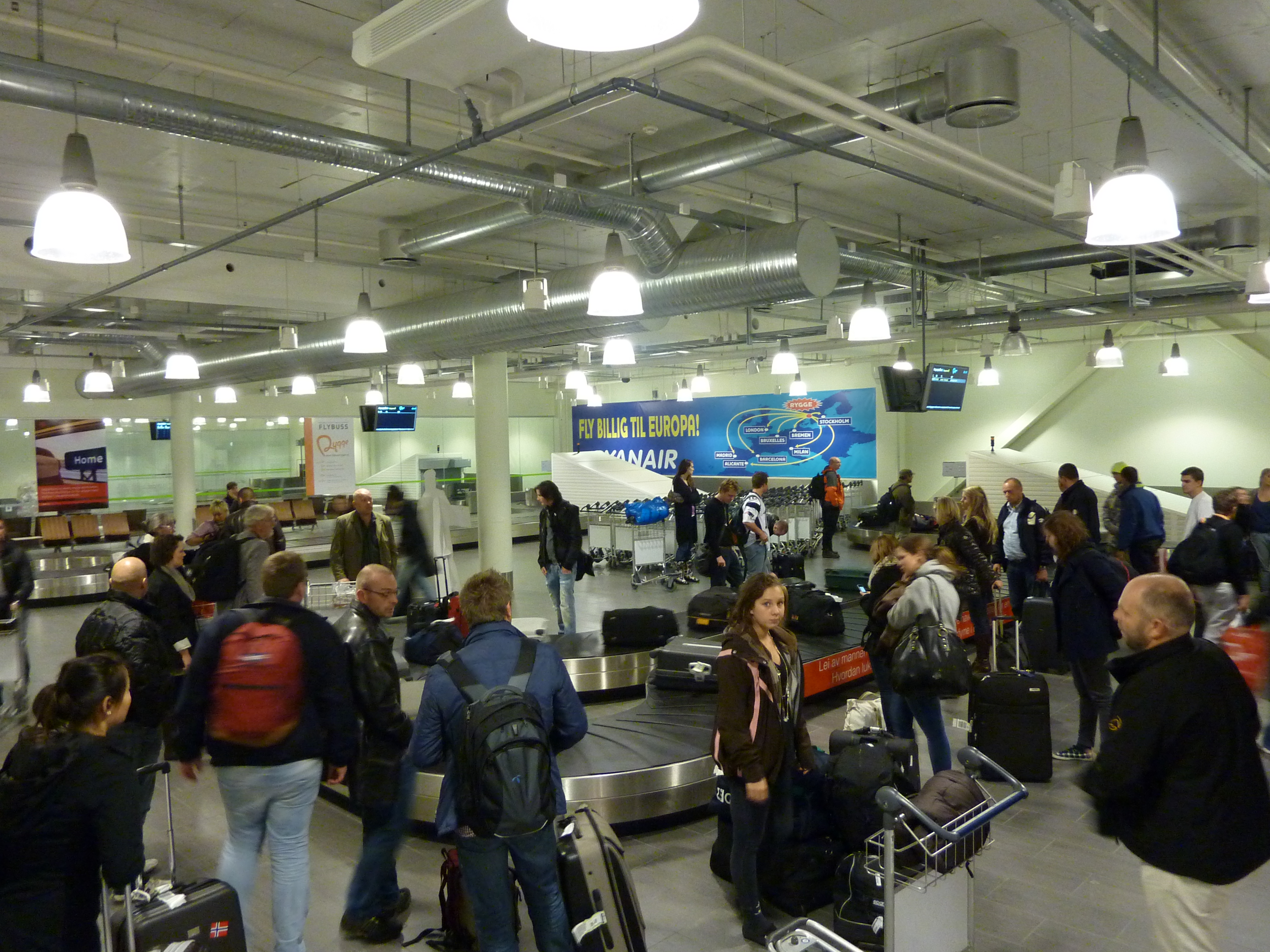
Arrivals hall

On 12 January 2000, Københavns Lufthavne, which operates among other things Copenhagen Airport, bought 33.3% of the shares in Rygge Sivile Lufthavn. The company stated that they had invited the Norwegian Civil Airport Administration to purchase part of the company, but that no decision had been made by the government agency. The company stated that they were therefore forced to invite a foreign airport operate to purchase part of the company to have sufficient competence in airport operations. In December, the Norwegian Civil Airport Administration stated that they were negative to the plans for civilian traffic at Rygge. The administration operates with the model that the large airports, in particular Gardermoen, make a profit, which is used to finance the deficits at smaller airports. The administration stated that establishing a civilian airport at Rygge would undermine the financial structure of Norwegian airports and would breach the political presumptions for constructing Gardermoen. If the administration was to be able to complete on price with Rygge, the state would have to give the necessary grants to cover the deficits at other airports. At the same time, Torp was required to pay their own air traffic control costs, which until then had been covered by the administration. In September 2001, the Norwegian Competition Authority supported the airport, stating that it would allow more competition on international flights from Norway, and could make it easier to establish domestic competition in the face of Scandinavian Airline's take-over of Braathens.

In June 2002, Norwegian Air Shuttle stated that they would start flights from Rygge, should the airport be built. At the same time, the military and the airport company were discussing where the optimal location for the terminal should be. Once decided, the Rygge Sivile Lufthavn hoped to send an application for a concession to the Ministry of Transport and Communications. In March 2003, Rygge Labour Party stated they were opposed to the civilian airport, because of the local noise concerns. In May, the airport company confirmed that Ryanair, which was using Torp, had shown interest in using Rygge. In June, the Rygge Sivile Lufthavn stated that had changed their strategy, and that they now were going to primarily target low-cost airlines. The airport hoped to initially establish routes to Copenhagen, Stockholm, London and Amsterdam, and that international destinations would be prioritized before domestic destinations. In February 2004, the Civil Aviation Authority stated that 51 issues needed to be resolved before civilian traffic would be permitted.

In a report published by the ministry in March 2004, it was estimated that the airport would have 700,000 to 800,000 passengers per year, making it the eighth largest in the country, and could have 1.3 million passengers by 2030. In a reply, the Federation of Norwegian Aviation Industries stated that they were opposed to establishing a new airport, and that there were sufficient airports in Eastern Norway. They also said that an airport outside Avinor (the new name for the Norwegian Civil Airport Administration) would result lower profits at Gardermoen, and thus higher fees for the rest of the airports. In addition, the airlines would have higher costs having to operate to additional airports in Eastern Norway. The project was also met with local protests. In particular, they were concerned about emission into the lake, Vansjø, or alternatively to a Ramsar site in Kurefjorden, and about the local noise pollution, with the airport being located close to Moss. Natur og Ungdom were also opposed to the airport, stating that it would increase the amount of air traffic and thus result in an increase in greenhouse gases.

Københavns Lufthavne sold its ownership in the company during 2004, because they were not satisfied with the progress. On 18 November 2004, the air force received the necessary concessions from the ministry to establish a civilian section. The concession contained a limit of 750,000 passengers per year, and had a duration of 10 years. It also required the airport to be open from 07h to 23h every day and permit general aviation. Negotiations between the air force and Rygge Sivile Lufthavn started in June 2005 to establish an agreement regarding operations and financing. In September, the air force and the company came to an agreement regarding the company's compensation to the military. The agreement was approved by the Ministry of Defence in January 2006. On 22 February, all permissions had been granted, and the company was able to take an investment decision. The agreements involved, in addition to a new terminal, upgrades to the runway, taxiway and navigational systems, which would be paid for by Rygge Sivile Lufthavn.

On 2 March, the Thon Group purchased 40% of the company. The remaining owners are the Orkla Group (40%), which at the time owned Borregaard, Østfold County Municipality (11%) and Østfold Energi (9%). On 12 June, activists from Natur og Ungdom chained themselves to the control tower in protest against the establishment of civilian aviation. The contract to build the terminal was awarded Skanska. In July, State Secretary Steinulf Tungesvik stated that if necessary, the ministry would use its right to set the prices at Rygge so it would not capture revenue from Gardermoen. At the same time, representatives from Torp, the Federation of Norwegian Aviation Industries and the Conservative Party stated that the agreement between the military and the operating company was illegal subsidies. In September, the Thon Group announced they would not build a planned 34-meter (112 ft) tall hotel at the airport, as military regulations would not permit it.

In January 2007, the charter operators Star Tour, Apollo and MyTravel Airways announced that they would start operating charter flights from 1 October. The initial construction was for seven gates, with possibilities to expand to fourteen. The first phase cost NOK 700 million and included a 16,000-square-meter (170,000 sq ft) terminal with a capacity for two million annual passengers, parking for 1650 cars and various travel facilities, such as duty-free stores, bank and restaurants. By April the airport still only had a single weekly charter route planned and the airport considered postponing. Prof. Frode Steen at the Norwegian School of Economics and Business Administration said that the airlines were postponing to get a better negotiating position. On 7 September, the final agreements between Rygge Sivile Lufthavn and the military were signed.

The airport was opened on 5 October 2007. The first flight from the airport took place on 17 October to Las Palmas de Gran Canaria, Spain. The operator later increased with three more charter destinations in early 2008. At the time of the first flight, the operator had sold 95% of the seats on their flights until the end of the year. 85% of the sales were to people living in Østfold. From that day, UniBuss started a coach service from Oslo in correspondence with all departures and arrivals at the airport.

The Civil Aviation Authority introduced a non-flight limitation on the airport from 23 to 07, out of consideration for the airport's neighbors. This was despite the municipal councils in Råde and Rygge supporting night flights. The decision was appealed, with the airport wanting to operate from 06:30 to 23:30, stating that they could lose half of Norwegian's departures. The ministry granted such a permit on 25 January 2008. This prompted a lawsuit from 150 households within the noise zone, who stated that people with similar noise pollution around Gardermoen had been granted NOK 225,000 in compensation each.

Norwegian Air Shuttle established a base at Rygge on 14 February 2008, with a second aircraft being stationed at the airport from 13 March. From February to April, Norwegian Air Shuttle started international flights to Alicante, Athens, Barcelona, Belgrade, Budapest, Istanbul, London, Málaga, Marrakesh, Palanga, Szczecin, Valencia, Warsaw, with between two and four weekly services to each destination. In addition, the airline started two daily services to Bergen. Norwegian's services to Belgrade, Istanbul, Marrakesh, Szczecin and Valencia were all terminated at Gardermoen the same time as they opened at Rygge. The airport stated that they had also been approached by Ryanair, who wanted to move the bulk of their services from Torp, but the airport stated that there was room for only one airline, and that they had prioritized Norwegian.

The first Norwegian Air Shuttle plane took off at the 14 February 2008 heading for Budapest. The same day, the Norwegian State Railways started offering a shuttle bus service from Rygge Station on the Østfold Line to the airport. At the same time, Norwegian Business Aviation started offering executive jets from Rygge. From March, Widerøe started two daily services from Rygge to Copenhagen, the hub for their owner, Scandinavian Airlines. Apollo started flights to Chania from 11 May. Star Tour started weekly charter flights to Antalya, Chania and Palma de Mallorca during the first half of 2008.

From 1 September, Widerøe terminated its Copenhagen route, while Norwegian terminated its London service. In October, Norwegian Air Shuttle introduced new international services to Las Palmas de Gran Canaria, Berlin, Kraków and Prague. New domestic routes were introduced to Trondheim, Stavanger, Tromsø and Bodø.

The airport stated that at the growth rate they were experiencing, they would reach their passenger ceiling in 2009, and would not have room for any other airlines than Norwegian. In November, the airport stated that they in 2008 would lose NOK 100 million, and that they needed between NOK 200 and 300 million in new share capital. However, neither Orkla nor Thon were willing to invest more in the airport unless the passenger ceiling was lifted. In a vote in the Parliament of Norway on 11 December, the ceiling was not lifted, with the proposal only receiving votes from the opposition. However, the ministry stated that they were going to consider the limitations in the concession. In January, the owners invested 50 million in the company. The airport had 450,000 passengers in 2008.

In January, Rygge was, with 24,400 passengers, larger than Torp in terms of domestic traffic. In February, the Civil Aviation Authority recommended that the airport's ceiling be lifted, and this was made effective by the ministry on 1 July. Instead, the airport was limited to 15,000 air movements per year. The ministry stated that the rationale was that the calculations for the original concession were based on smaller aircraft, and that the passenger ceiling was based on an estimated 20,000 take-offs and landings. From January through April, the domestic services from Rygge had captured 6% of the market share from Eastern Norway.

In October and November, Ryanair established itself at the airport, and started flights to Alicante, Barcelona, Brussels, Bremen, Madrid, Milan and London. Norwegian stated that they were not worried about competition from Ryanair, and announced that they would continue with flights to the Mediterranean, Eastern Europe and domestically. However, they would not start the announced services to Amsterdam and London, and instead concentrate their growth at Gardermoen. The company stated that they made 3% of their revenue at Rygge. On 9 September, the ministry increased the air movement ceiling to 21,000 movements per year. On 24 November, Ryanair announced that they would establish a base at Rygge in March 2010. The airline would start services to Århus, Berlin, Dublin, Weeze, Eindhoven, Gdańsk, Kraków, La Rochelle, Málaga, Munich, Palma de Mallorca, Paris, Riga, Wrocław, Valencia and Venice. In December, the company announced further routes to Faro and Zadar.

In 2009, the airport company lost NOK 102 million. From 5 May, Ryanair started flights to Kaunas. In mid-2010, Norwegian terminated its services to Berlin, Budapest, Palanga, Prague and Valencia, and reduced the frequency to Alicante and Málaga. However, it started new routes to Dalaman and Thessaloniki. In July, Norwegian stated that they were considering terminating all services from Rygge. In particular, the company stated that they were not satisfied with having higher fees than Ryanair, and that they were in negotiations with Torp to move their operations there. In September, Norwegian announced that it was terminating the services to Bodø and Tromsø.

In November 2010, the instrument landing system (ILS) was upgraded from Category I to Category II. This included the installation of 800 light emitting diodes (LED) on the runway and taxiway, making Rygge the first airport in Europe with such an installation. It decreased the requirement for visibility from 800 to 300 meters (2,620 to 980 ft). The upgrades cost NOK 65 million, and made Rygge the second airport with ILS Cat II in Norway, after Stavanger Airport, Sola (Gardermoen has Cat III). The same month, Ryanair started new routes to London, Liverpool, Rome, Tampere. At the same time, Norwegian terminated its service to Stavanger.

=== Closure to civilian traffic ===
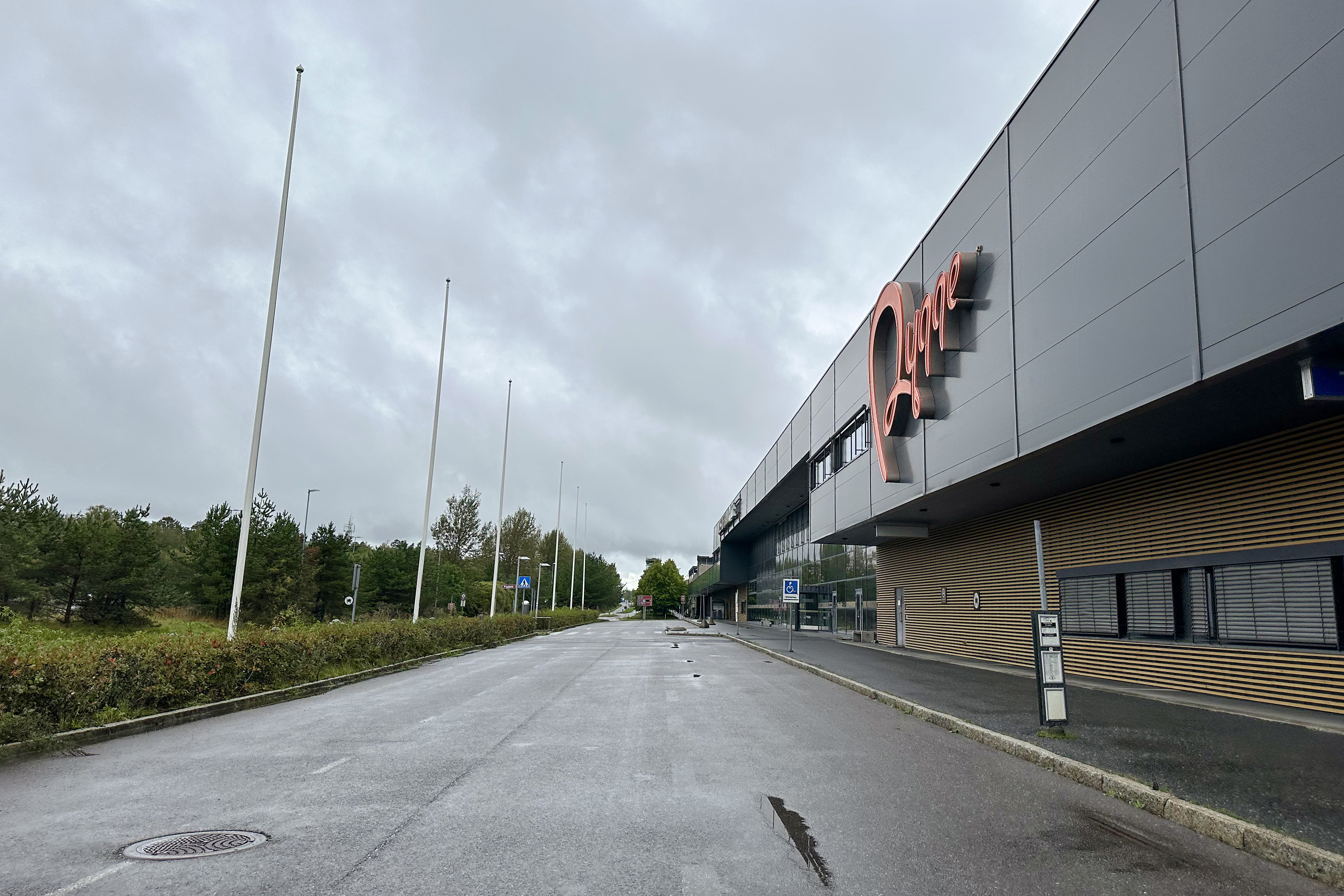
The abandoned passenger terminal in 2023

The airport announced on 24 May 2016 that it would cease civilian operations by 1 November 2016, stating that the Norwegian air passenger charge made Rygge uncompetitive. Ryanair, the airport's largest customer (the only other airline offering a few regular services being Norwegian Air Shuttle), had earlier announced it would pull out of Rygge if the air passenger charge was not removed. Ryanair accounted for around two thirds of traffic at the airport and served 29 destinations, of which 16 were year-round, from Moss/Rygge as of October 2016. Business travellers did not really use the airport. Attempts were made by typical business airlines on domestic flights and destinations like London, which were not successful. Business travellers usually require frequent departures and Ryanair offered sparse schedules with often a few flights per destination and week. The attempts on domestic flights were also less attractive since Rygge could not compete with Gardermoen on frequency.

On 1 June 2016, Ryanair confirmed it would close its base at Moss/Rygge by 29 October 2016. Ryanair subsequently cancelled 16 routes to/from the Oslo area entirely, while moving 8 routes to Sandefjord Airport, Torp and 2 routes to the primary Oslo Airport, Gardermoen. Ryanair wrote that the tax forced them to halve their traffic to and from Norway. Since Rygge could not sustain half the traffic, the decision was made to close it. The last aircraft to depart was an empty Ryanair Boeing 737-800 on a ferry flight to Gothenburg on 30 October.

== Facilities ==
=== Overview ===
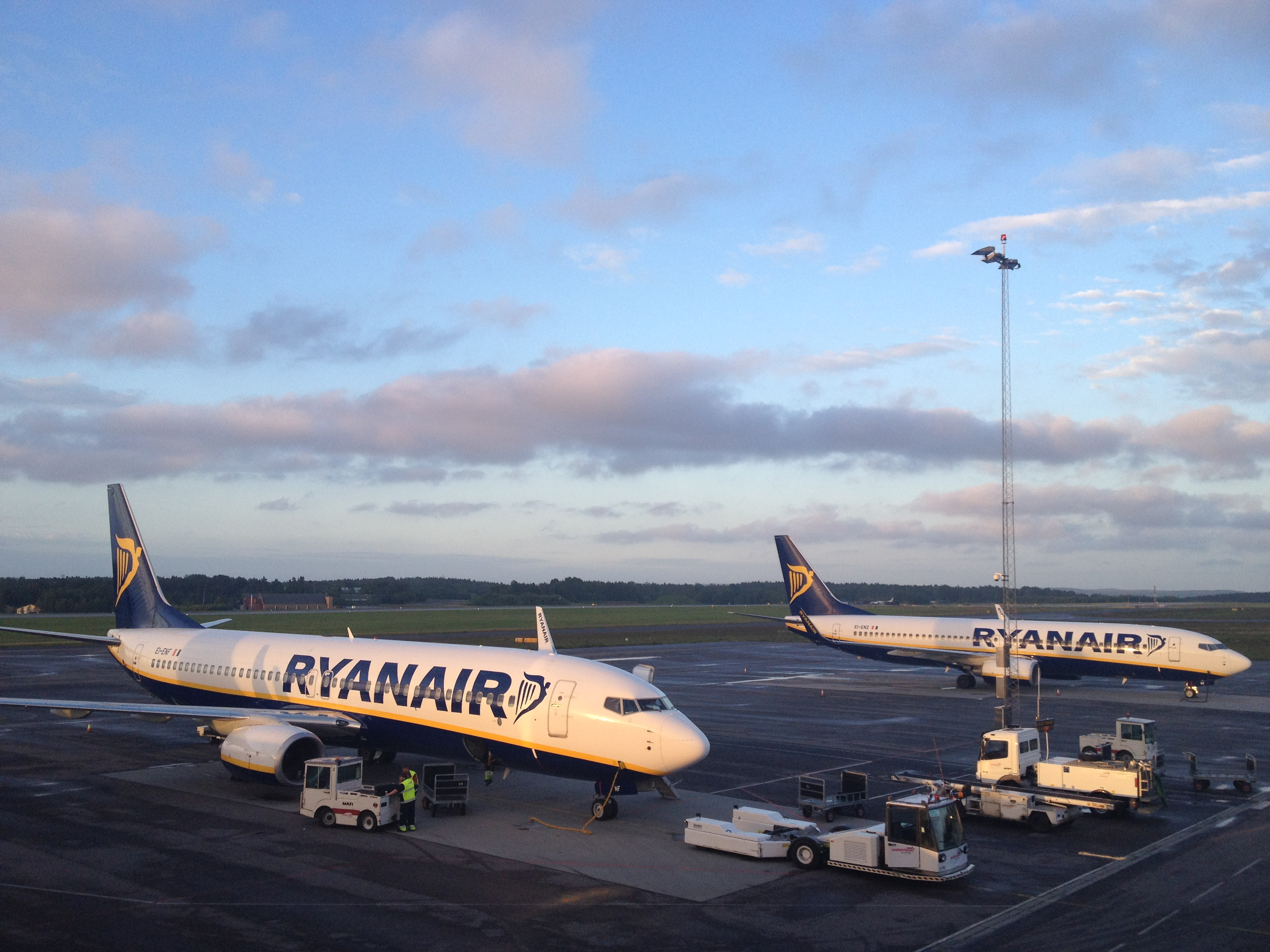
Apron view with two Ryanair Boeing 737-800s at Moss Airport, Rygge

The airport is a joint military and civilian airport located in the municipality of Rygge, west of the lake Vansjø. The airport is primarily an international, low-cost airport, but also serves as a domestic regional airport for Østfold and Follo. The airport is owned by the Norwegian Defence Estates Agency, while the civilian terminal is owned by Rygge Sivile Lufthavn AS ("Rygge Civilian Airport"), a private company owned by the Thon Group (40%), the Orkla Group (40%), Østfold Energi (15%) and Østfold County Municipality (5%).

The terminal building is 16,000 square meters (170,000 sq ft), and is dimensioned for 2 million passengers annually. The terminal is open around the clock. There are eight gates and seven aircraft stands, of which two can switch between domestic and international departures. The runway is 2,442 meters (8,012 ft) long and 45 meters (148 ft) wide. It is equipped with instrument landing system Category II using solely light emitting diodes (LED) as lights. This allows landing with 300 meters (980 ft) visibility. The airport has a taxiway and a de-icing platform.

=== Military ===
Rygge Air Station is home to the 720 Squadron of the Royal Norwegian Air Force (RNoAF), which operates Bell 412 helicopters, the 717 Squadron which operates Dassault Falcon 20 jets, and a detachment of the 330 Squadron which operates AgustaWestland AW101 search and rescue helicopters. The air station also hosts several support functions, including education, logistics of the air force, and branch of the Norwegian Home Guard. The military run all common functions of the airport, such as the runway, fire and rescue service, and the air traffic control.

== Airlines and destinations ==
As of 30 October 2016, there is no longer any scheduled commercial traffic to and from Moss/Rygge. Ryanair shut down its entire operations on 29 October 2016 while the only other regular tenant, Norwegian Air Shuttle, left a few days earlier.

== Ground transport ==
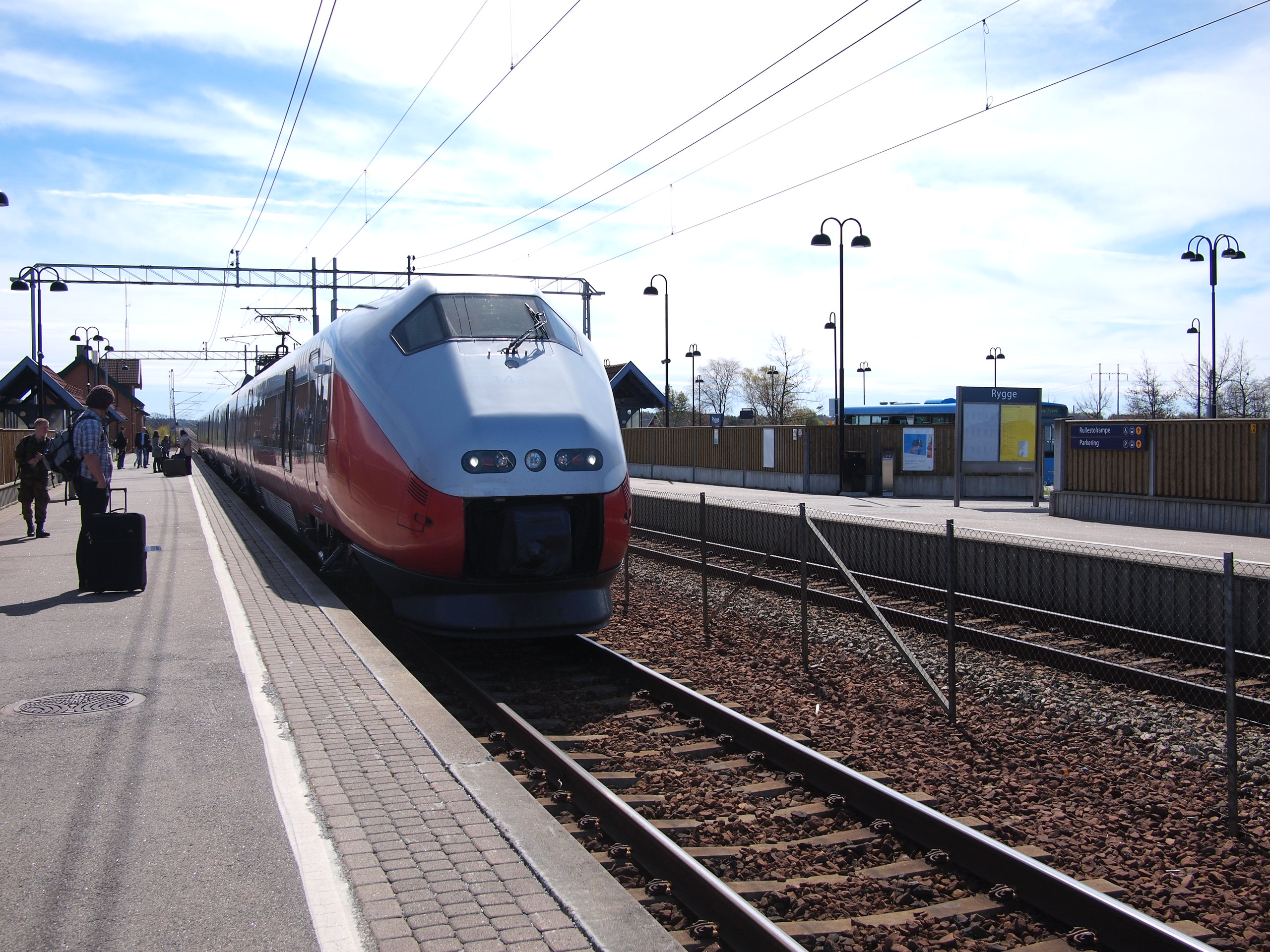
Rygge Station with a Class 73B electric multiple unit of the Norwegian State Railways

=== Car ===
Moss Airport, Rygge is located 67 kilometers (42 mi) from Oslo; this compares to 49 kilometers (30 mi) for Gardermoen and 120 kilometers (75 mi) for Torp. The terminal building is located next to European Route E6. The airport is located 45 minutes from Oslo, 13 kilometers (8.1 mi) and 12 minutes from Moss, 27 kilometers (17 mi) and 25 minutes from Fredrikstad. Access to Buskerud runs via the Oslofjord Tunnel, while Vestfold is available via the Moss–Horten Ferry. There is parking for 2,500 cars at the airport.

=== Rail ===
The airport is located 4 kilometers (2.5 mi) from Rygge Station on the Østfold Line. The railway station is 69.28 kilometers (43.05 mi) from Oslo Central Station (Oslo S) and is served by the Norwegian State Railways, who operate an hourly regional train service between Oslo and Halden using NSB Class 73 electric multiple units, with an extra departure in the rush hour. Three of the daily services continue onwards south to Gothenburg, Sweden. Travel time to Oslo S is 50 minutes, to Halden is 55 minutes, and to Gothenburg C is 3 hours and 3 minutes. NSB operated a free shuttle bus to Moss Airport, Rygge, which took 8 minutes. There is a waiting room in the station building

=== Coach ===
Prior to the closure of the airport, UniBuss operated Rygge-Ekspressen from Oslo with a travel time of 60 minutes. The bus service ran in correspondence with all of Norwegian's and Ryanair's flights, leaving 2 hours and 40 minutes before departure. NOR-WAY Bussekspress operated the service Flybussekspressen, which ran from Fredrikstad & Sarpsborg via Moss Airport, Moss and Follo to Oslo Airport, Gardermoen. Travel time to Fredrikstad was 30 minutes, Sarpsborg 20, and travel time to Gardermoen is 1 hour and 40 minutes.
