= Råde =

Municipality in Norway

Råde komune Råde
- Municipality
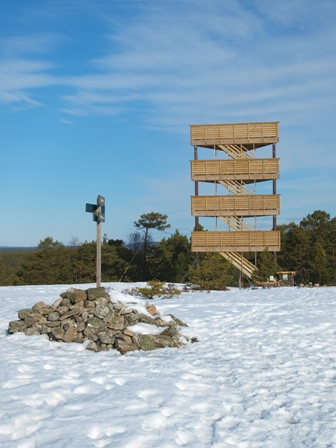
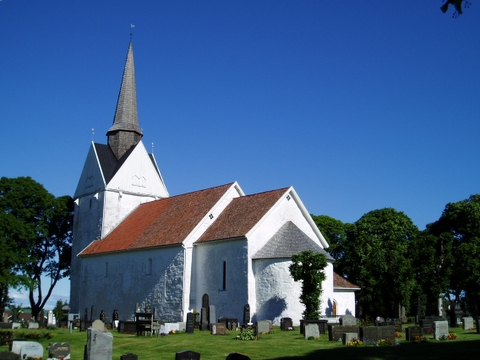
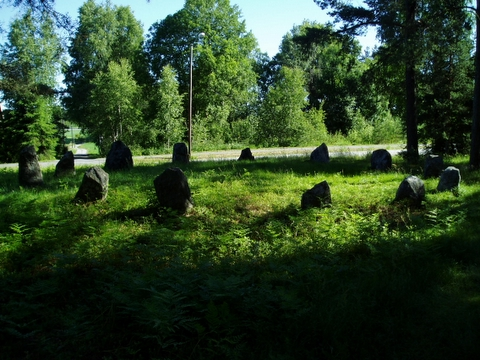
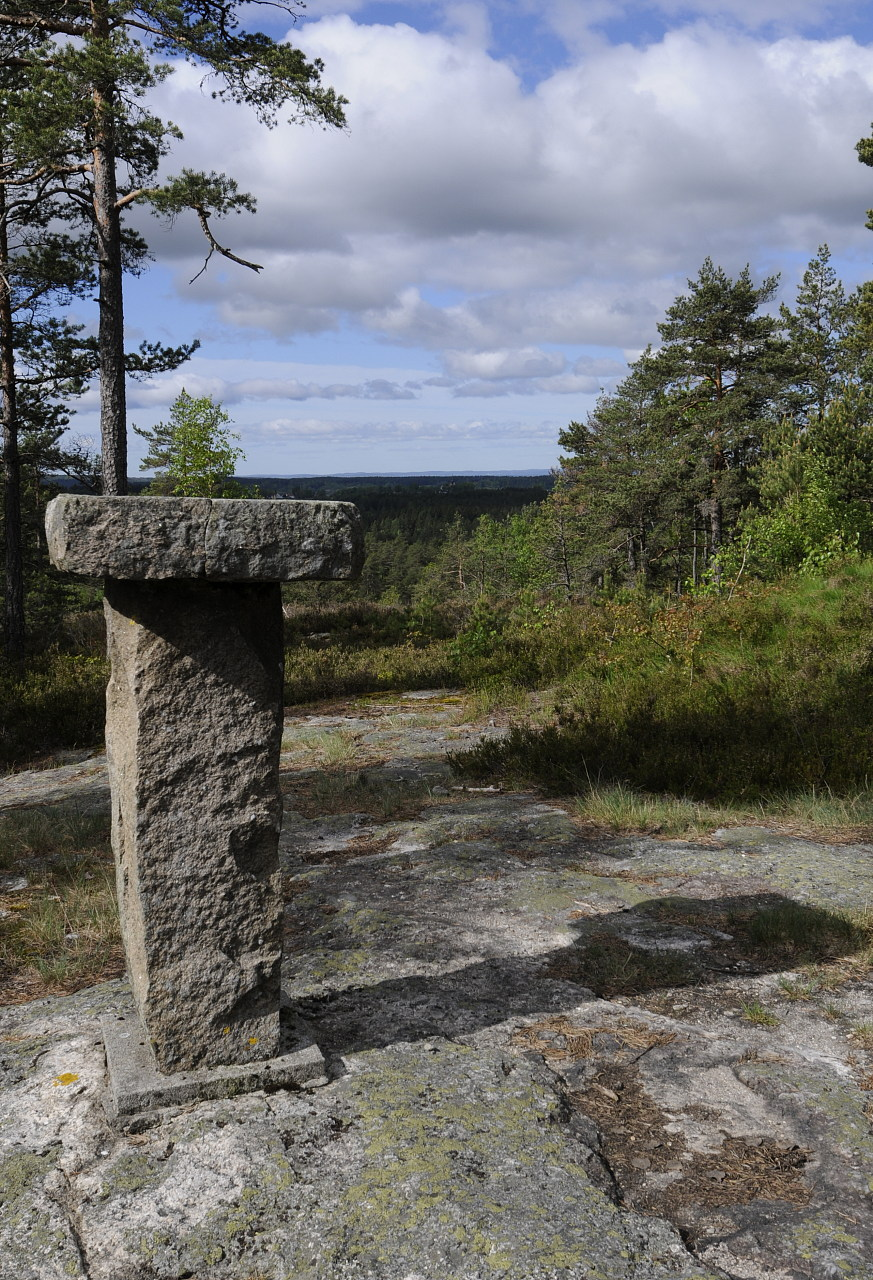
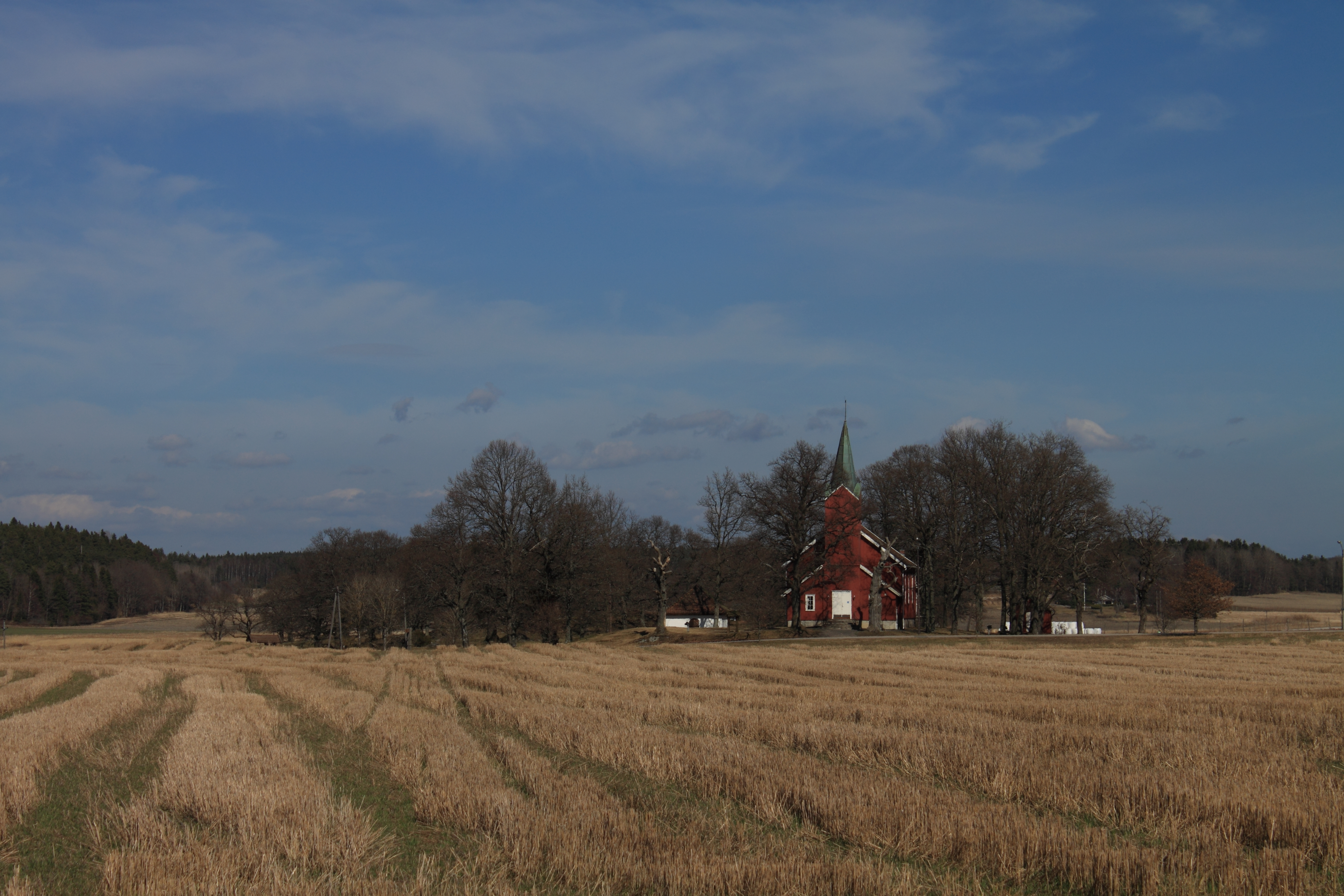
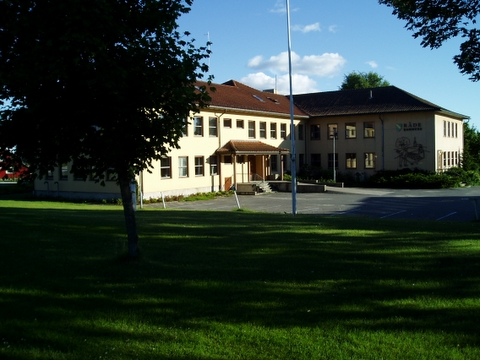
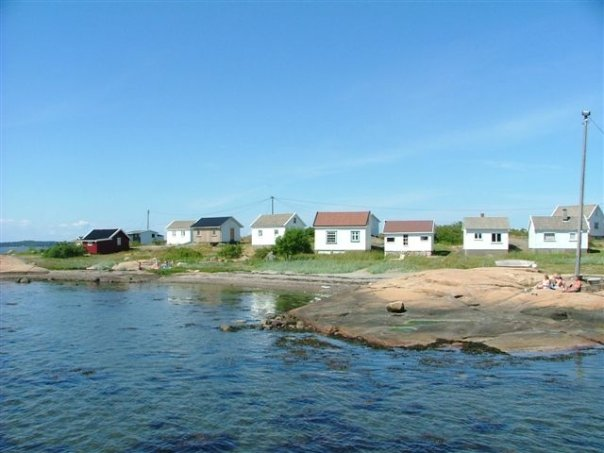
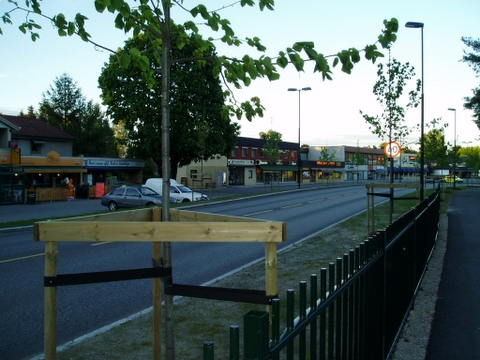
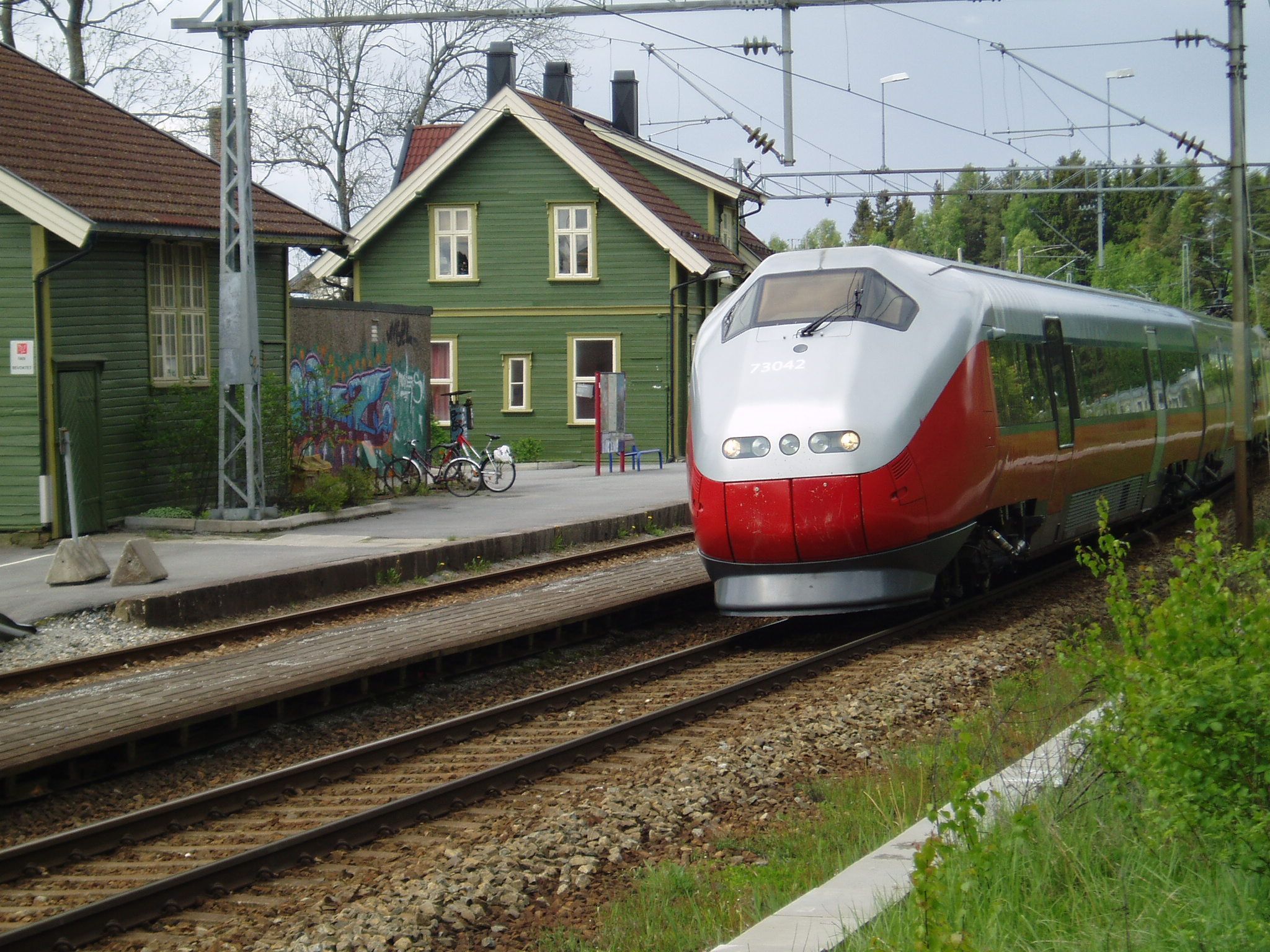
- Fugleleiken utkikkstårn Råde kirke Fornminner på Lundeby Veteåsenbatteriet siktebord Tomb kirke Råde Herredshus Saltholmen Karlshus Råde Train station

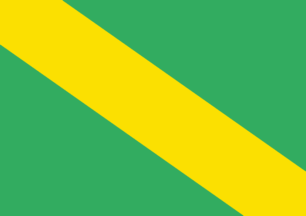
- Flag Coat of arms

- Location in Norway Location in Europe
- Coordinates: 59°20′56″N 10°51′18″E
- First settled: ca 3000 B.C
- Missingmyr, Karlshus, Slangsvold, Tomb, Saltnes: See list

Government
  - Body: Råde Municipal Council
  - Mayor: René Rafshol (H)

Area
  - Total: 119 km^{2} (46 sq mi)
  - Land: 105 km^{2} (41 sq mi)
- Elevation: 5 m (16 ft)

Population
  - Total: 7,890
  - Rank: 373
  - Density: 75/km^{2} (190/sq mi)
- Demonym(s): Rådesokning; Råsokning
- Time zone: UTC+1
- Postal code: 1640
- Website: www.rade.kommune.no

Råde is a municipality in Østfold county, Norway. The administrative centre of the municipality is the village of Karlshus. The parish of Raade was established as a municipality on 1 January 1838.

The neighbouring municipalities are Våler, Moss, Sarpsborg, and Fredrikstad. There are four villages in the municipality: Karlshus, Saltnes, Missingmyr, and Slangsvold.

== General information ==
=== Name ===
The municipality (originally the parish) is named after the old Råde farm (Old Norse: Róða), since the first church was built. The name is identical with the word róða which means "bar, pole, or rod". Here it is referring to one of Norway's many terminal moraines, and the farm and the church named after it. Prior to 1921, the name was written "Raade".

== History ==
Traces of settlements from 3000 BC have been located at Vansjø.

=== Coat-of-arms ===
The coat-of-arms is from modern times. They were granted on 30 May 1980. The arms are canting for the name of the municipality. It shows a yellow bend on a green background. The arms thus symbolise the moraine and glacial path from the Ice ages that runs through the municipality. The colour green symbolises the fertile soil.

== Demography ==
Number of minorities (1st and 2nd generation) in Råde by country of origin in 2017
Ancestry	Number
Poland	271
Sweden	49
Somalia	48
Denmark	39
Lithuania	33

== Råde Church ==
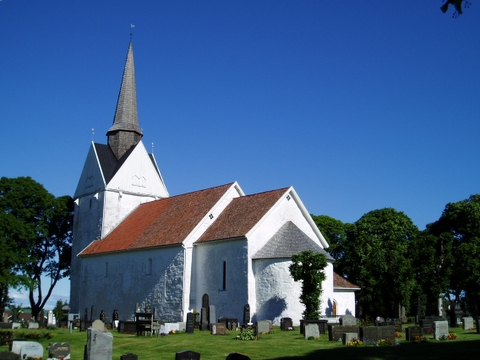
Råde Church

Råde church (Råde kirke) is a medieval era church in Råde parish. The church belongs to Vestre Borgesyssel deanery in Diocese of Borg. The church dates from 1185 and is of Romanesque style. The edifice is of brick and stone and has 300 seats. The church has a rectangular nave and narrow choir with an apse which is semicircular. The baptismal font is from the 1500s and the altarpiece is from 1638. The altarpiece was painted both in 1862 and 1918. In 1950–60, the altarpiece was restored. The church was extensively repaired in 1860–1862. In the late 1950s, restoration work initiated.

== Climate ==
Climate data is supplied by Rygge meteorological station by the airport, located right on the border between Rygge and Råde.

Climate data for Råde (1986-2016; 1955- for extremes)
Month	Jan	Feb	Mar	Apr	May	Jun	Jul	Aug	Sep	Oct	Nov	Dec	Year
Record high °C (°F)	11.2 (52.2)	13.5 (56.3)	21 (70)	24.9 (76.8)	30.0 (86.0)	31.2 (88.2)	33.7 (92.7)	34.2 (93.6)	25 (77)	20 (68)	14.7 (58.5)	13.2 (55.8)	34.2 (93.6)
Mean maximum °C (°F)	6.9 (44.4)	7.9 (46.2)	11.7 (53.1)	18.1 (64.6)	23.8 (74.8)	24.7 (76.5)	27.2 (81.0)	25.5 (77.9)	21.2 (70.2)	15.4 (59.7)	10.6 (51.1)	8.3 (46.9)	27.2 (81.0)
Mean daily maximum °C (°F)	0.7 (33.3)	1.5 (34.7)	5 (41)	10.1 (50.2)	15.6 (60.1)	19 (66)	21.2 (70.2)	20.5 (68.9)	16.2 (61.2)	10.1 (50.2)	4.8 (40.6)	1.7 (35.1)	10.5 (51.0)
Daily mean °C (°F)	−1.7 (28.9)	−1.5 (29.3)	1.1 (34.0)	5.6 (42.1)	10.8 (51.4)	14.5 (58.1)	16.9 (62.4)	15.9 (60.6)	11.9 (53.4)	7 (45)	2.4 (36.3)	−1 (30)	6.8 (44.3)
Mean daily minimum °C (°F)	−4.7 (23.5)	−4.4 (24.1)	−2.3 (27.9)	1.6 (34.9)	6.1 (43.0)	10.2 (50.4)	12.8 (55.0)	12 (54)	8 (46)	4.1 (39.4)	−0.2 (31.6)	−3.9 (25.0)	3.3 (37.9)
Mean minimum °C (°F)	−15.7 (3.7)	−14.6 (5.7)	−10.7 (12.7)	−4.5 (23.9)	0.3 (32.5)	5.2 (41.4)	8.1 (46.6)	6.2 (43.2)	0.8 (33.4)	−3.8 (25.2)	−8.1 (17.4)	−14.5 (5.9)	−15.7 (3.7)
Record low °C (°F)	−27.7 (−17.9)	−31.5 (−24.7)	−28.4 (−19.1)	−11.6 (11.1)	−4.9 (23.2)	−0.3 (31.5)	3.6 (38.5)	0.7 (33.3)	−5.1 (22.8)	−9.7 (14.5)	−19.5 (−3.1)	−26.5 (−15.7)	−31.5 (−24.7)
Source: Meteorologisk institutt

== Culture ==
Helleristning [ petroglyphs ] from the Bronze Age have been found in Råde.

== Notable people ==
- Johannes Gerckens Bassøe (born 1878 in Råde – 1962) a Norwegian jurist and civil servant who was the first Governor of Svalbard
- Egil Hovland (born 1924 in Råde – 2013) a Norwegian composer who wrote in diverse styles
- Hermund Nygård (born 1979 in Råde) a Norwegian jazz drummer
- Vidar Martinsen (born 1982 in Råde) a Norwegian footballer with over 250 club caps
