= Asmaløy =

Island in Norway

Coordinates: 59°04′N 10°57′E

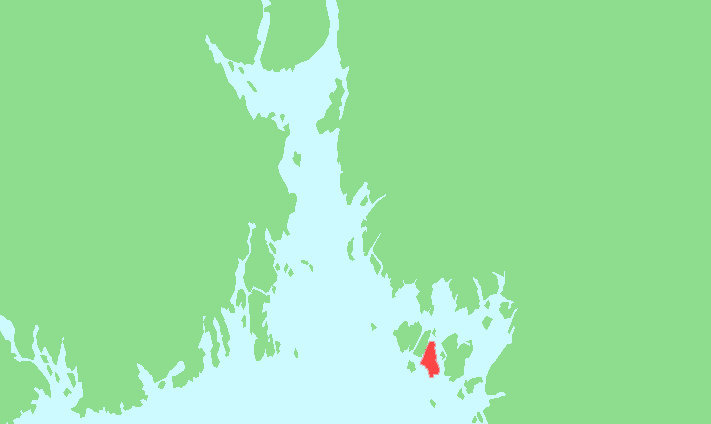
Locator map of Asmaløy, Østfold, Norway

Asmaløy is an island in Hvaler municipality of Østfold county, Norway.

Asmaløy is one of the larger islands in the archipelago of Hvaler which consists of over 800 islands, islets, skerries and reefs located in the outer Oslofjord. Hvaler tunnel (Norwegian: Hvalertunnelen) joins Asmaløy with Kirkeøy, the largest island in the municipality and the site of the administrative centre at Skjærhalden. Hvaler tunnel is an underwater tunnel on Highway 108 (Rv108). The tunnel goes under the strait between Asmaløy and Kirkeøy. The 3,751-meter (12,306 ft) long tunnel was opened on 2 October 1989. Hvaler tunnel is closed to pedestrians and cyclists.

Vikerhavn is a small fishing harbour and village on the southern part of the island.

The author Johan Borgen lived on Asmaløy for many years at a site known as Knatten.

== See also ==
- Herføl
- Tisler
