= Hollungen =

Norwegian ferry company

Hollungen AS is a company that operates passenger ferries in Hvaler, Norway. The ships MF Hvalerfergen II, MB Hollungen og MB Olava are used on the route Skjærhalden–Lauer–Herføl–Nedgården–Nordre Sandøy–Gr.sund–Makø–Skjærhalden. The company is owned by Peter Palmer, who bought it when the municipal company Hvaler Båt- og Fergeselskap was privatized and split into Hollungen and Hvaler Fjordcruise in 2001.
