= Hvaler Båt- og Fergeselskap =

Norwegian ferry company

Hvaler Båt- og Fergeselskap AS is a defunct municipal company that operated the ferries in Hvaler, Norway. Founded in 1893, it was owned by the municipality until 2001 when it was privatized and sold to Glommen Bulk, that again split the company into Hvaler Fjordcruise and Hollungen in 2004. Hvaler Båt- og Fergeselskap operated from the municipal center of Skjærhalden with routes to Lauer, Herføl, Nedgården, Nordre Sandøy, Gr.sund and Makø as well as Strømstad in Sweden. Prior to the Hvaler Tunnel opening in 1989 it also operated the Skjærhalden–Hvaler Ferry.
