= Ytre Hvaler National Park =

National park in Norway

- IUCN category II (national park)
- Interactive map of Ytre Hvaler National Park
- Location: Hvaler Municipality, Norway
- Nearest city: Fredrikstad
- Coordinates: 59°N 11°E
- Area: 354 km^{2} (137 sq mi), of which 14 km^{2} (5.4 sq mi) is land 340 km^{2} (130 sq mi) is water
- Established: 26 June 2009
- Governing body: Norwegian Directorate for Nature Management

Ytre Hvaler National Park (Norwegian: Ytre Hvaler nasjonalpark, lit. 'Outer Hvaler National Park') is a national park located within Hvaler Municipality and Fredrikstad Municipality in Østfold county, Norway. The park was established on 26 June 2009 and was the first national marine park in the country of Norway. The park manager is located in Skjærhalden.

Ytre Hvaler is mostly a marine park, covering the outer parts of the skerries of the east shore of Oslofjord. To the south, the national park's boundaries lie on the Norway–Sweden border next to Kosterhavet National Park. Ytre Hvaler covers an area of 354 km^{2} (137 sq mi), of which 340 km^{2} (130 sq mi) is sea and 14 km^{2} (5 sq mi) is land.

Settlements in the area may have been as old as the Bronze Age. The park is dominated by the coastal culture which has used the area for centuries, resulting in it including boathouses for fishing. Akerøya was settled between 1682 and 1807. There are more than 50 shipwrecks in the park, the most prominent being the Danish frigate HDMS Lossen which was lost during the Christmas Flood of 1717.

Within the park are two lighthouses: Torbjørnskjær and Homlungen, both of which are operated by the Norwegian Coastal Administration. The islands remain in use for grazing. The park includes the Tisler Reef, a cold water coral reef, consisting mostly of Lophelia. The Tisler Reef is the largest known coral reef in sheltered waters in Europe, and is located near the island of Tisler.

== Gallery ==
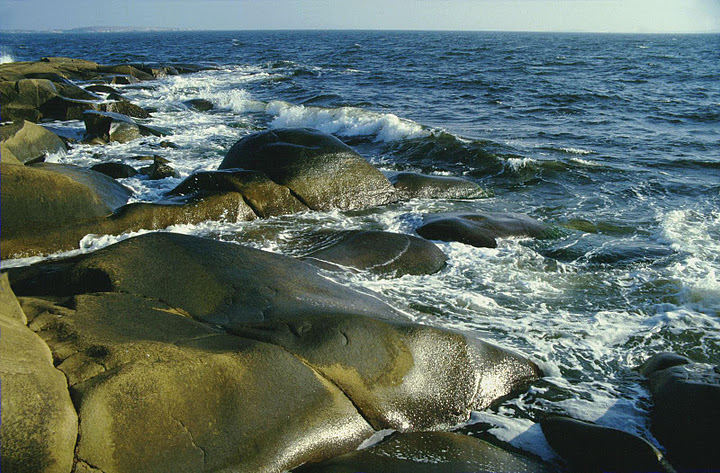
Rødshue

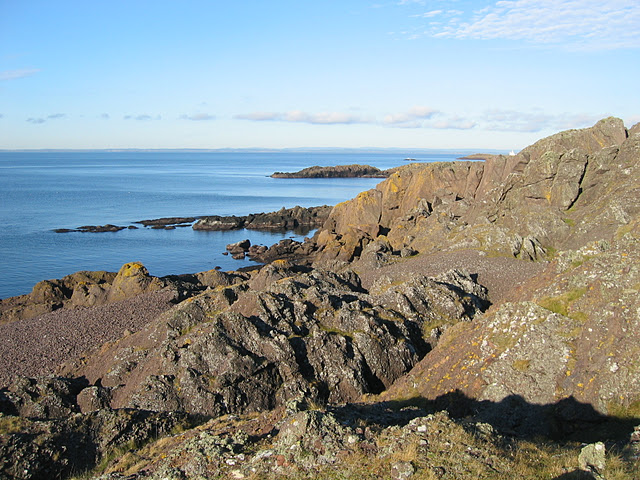
Søsterøyene

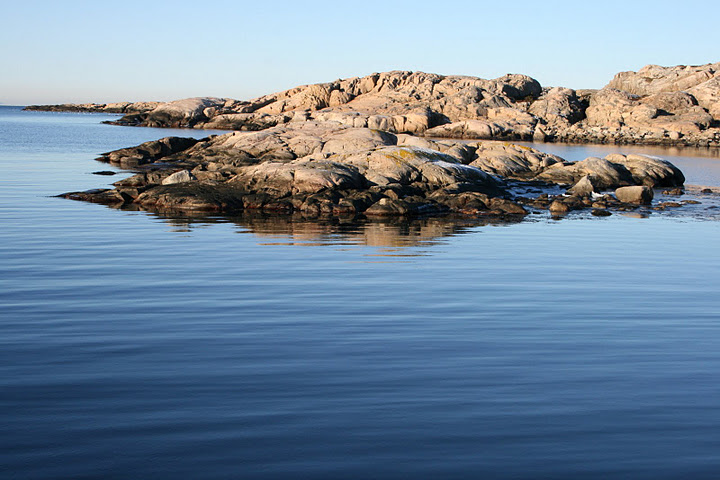
Tisler

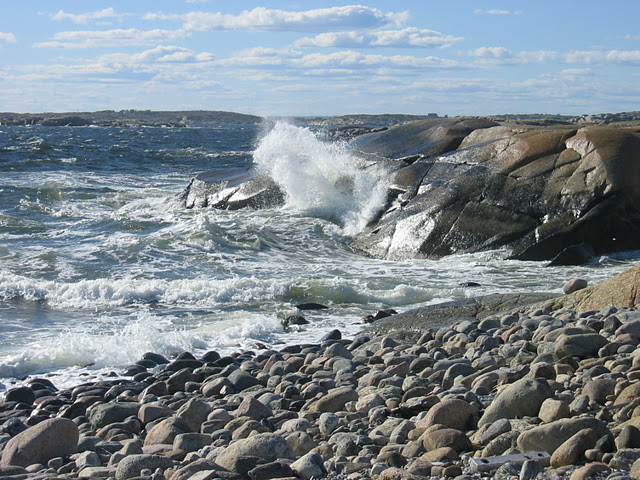
Herføl

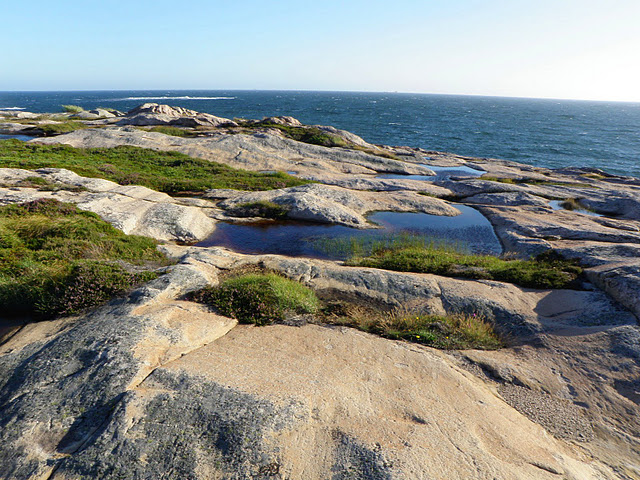
Guttormstangen

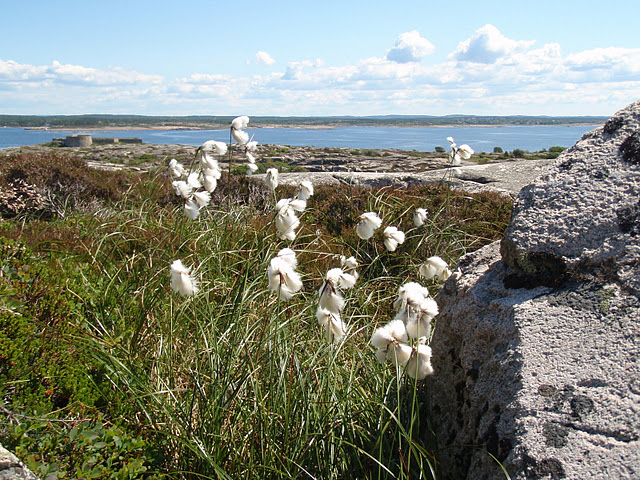
Akerøya

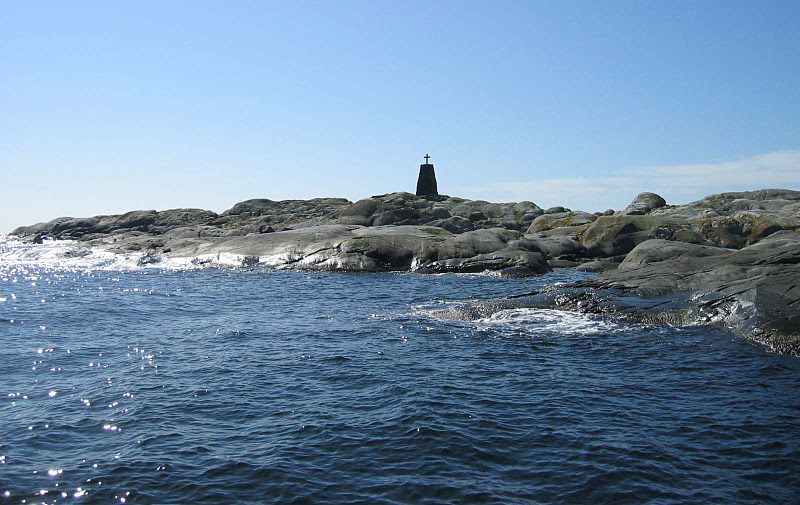
Heia

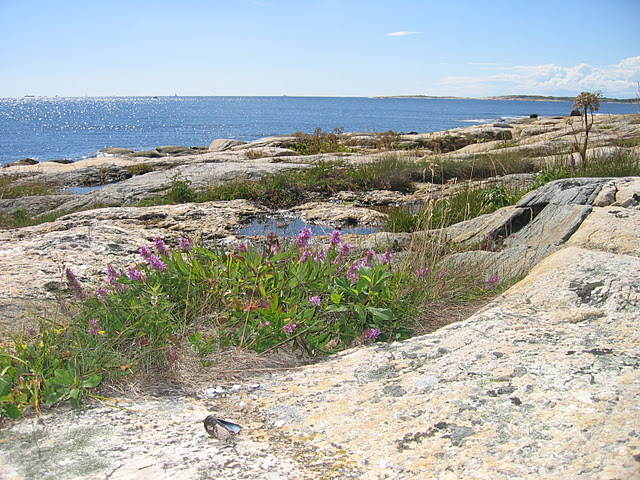
Landfasten

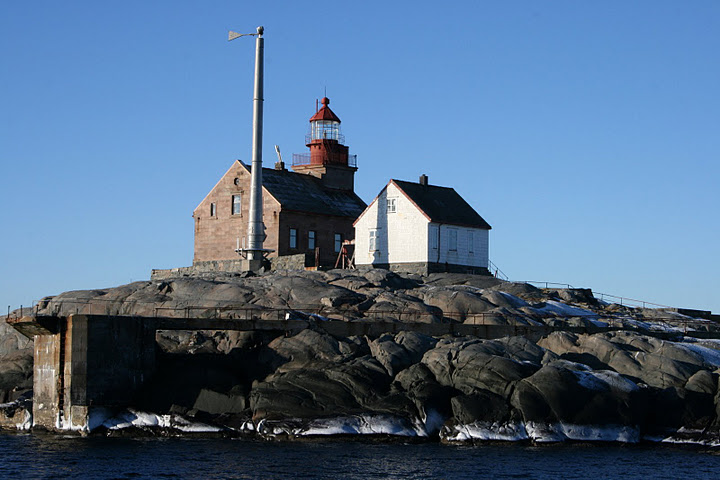
Torbjørnskjær lighthouse,

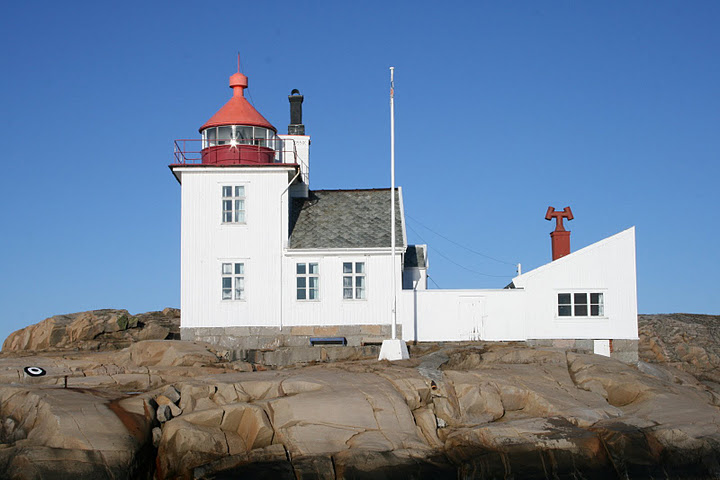
Holmlungen lighthouse

== Sources ==
- Stokke, Knut Bjørn; Haukeland, Jan Vidar (15 October 2018). "Balancing tourism development and nature protection across national park borders – a case study of a coastal protected area in Norway" (PDF). Journal of Environmental Planning and Management. 61 (12): 2151–2165. Bibcode:2018JEPM...61.2151S. doi:10.1080/09640568.2017.1388772. hdl:11250/2587604. ISSN 0964-0568.
