= Spjærøy Church =

- Spjærøy kirke
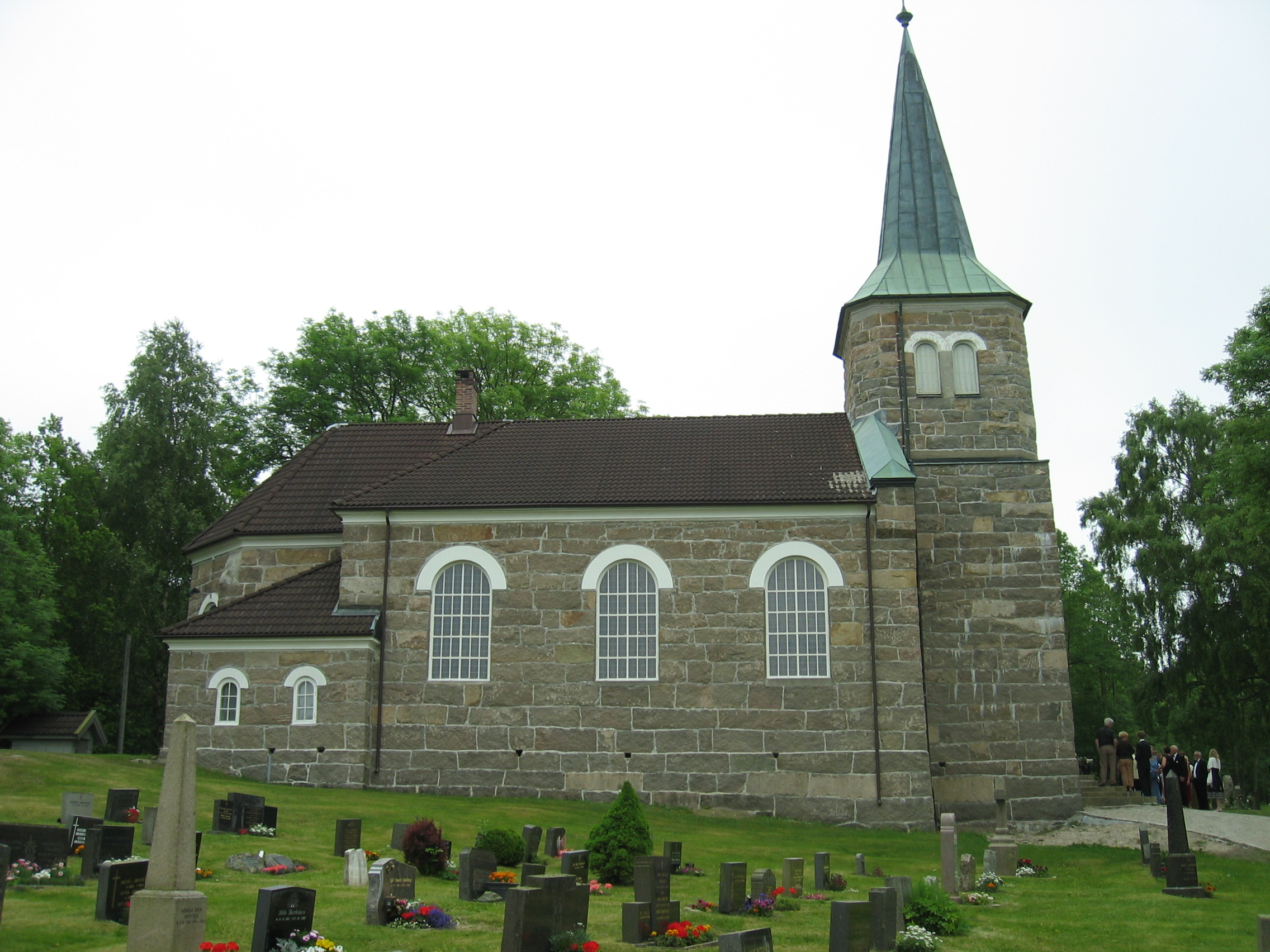
- Spjærøy Church (left side view)

- Location of the church Spjærøy Church (Norway)
- 59°05′18″N 10°55′07″E
- Location: Dypedal, Hvaler, Østfold
- Country: Norway
- Denomination: Church of Norway
- Churchmanship: Evangelical Lutheran
- Website: www.hvaler.kirken.no/

History
- Status: Parish church

Architecture
- Functional status: Active
- Architect: Jacob Wilhelm Nordan
- Completed: 1891

Specifications
- Capacity: 175
- Materials: Granite

Administration
- Diocese: Diocese of Borg
- Deanery: Fredrikstad Domprosti
- Parish: Hvaler

Clergy
- Bishop: Atle Sommerfeldt

Spjærøy Church is a century-old Protestant church belonging to the Church of Norway located in Dypedal, Hvaler—a group of islands in Østfold county, Norway situated between Vesterøy and Asmaløy. Officially called Spjærøy kirke, the church was built in 1889 and is part of the Fredrikstad Domprosti (rural deanery), Diocese of Borg.

== History ==
In the 1880s, the increasing population in Hvaler had brought about the need to either expand the existing Hvaler church or construct a new building to accommodate the growing number of church-goers. In May 1887, the plan to construct a new granite church in Dypedal was approved by the municipal officials. The design was made by architect Jacob Wilhelm Nordan, while the construction was supervised by master mason Peder Emanuelsen Utengen from Kirkeøy. In May 1889, the cornerstone was laid and in July 1891 Bishop Carl Peter Parelius Essendrop dedicated the church.

== Architecture and interiors ==
The church building was built primarily of granite derived from a nearby mountain. The church interior was originally maintained in a dark brown color, but after several decades until the present is maintained in white, dark red and blue. The church's chancels has three stained glass windows—designed by Rolf Klemetsrud and Ivar Johansen in 1951—portray the Lamb and Cross, the Resurrection and a pelican. The church bell was cast by Anders Riise of Tønsberg in 1837. The altarpiece, which at first was a huge white Christian cross set on a dark background, was replaced in 1941 with an altar painting by Alfhild Børsum Johnsen from Kirkeøy. The partition in the pulpit, which has four reliefs depicting the Four Evangelists, was sculpted by Sverre Johnsen. In 1965, a new organ was installed in the church, which was manufactured by the J.H. Jørgensen Organ Co. of Oslo. The church had been renovated several times since its dedication, first in 1941 for its 50th anniversary, then in 1958, and the latest in 1991 for its 100th anniversary.

== Cultural heritage ==
Aside from its inherent religious nature, Spjærøy Church is also considered as a historical monument and is included in the Norwegian Directorate for Cultural Heritage database, No. 85531. Key historical and current aspects of the church were discussed in a chapter of a book written by Thorkildsen.
