= Lauer, Norway =

Island in Norway

Coordinates: 59°00′30″N 11°00′45″E

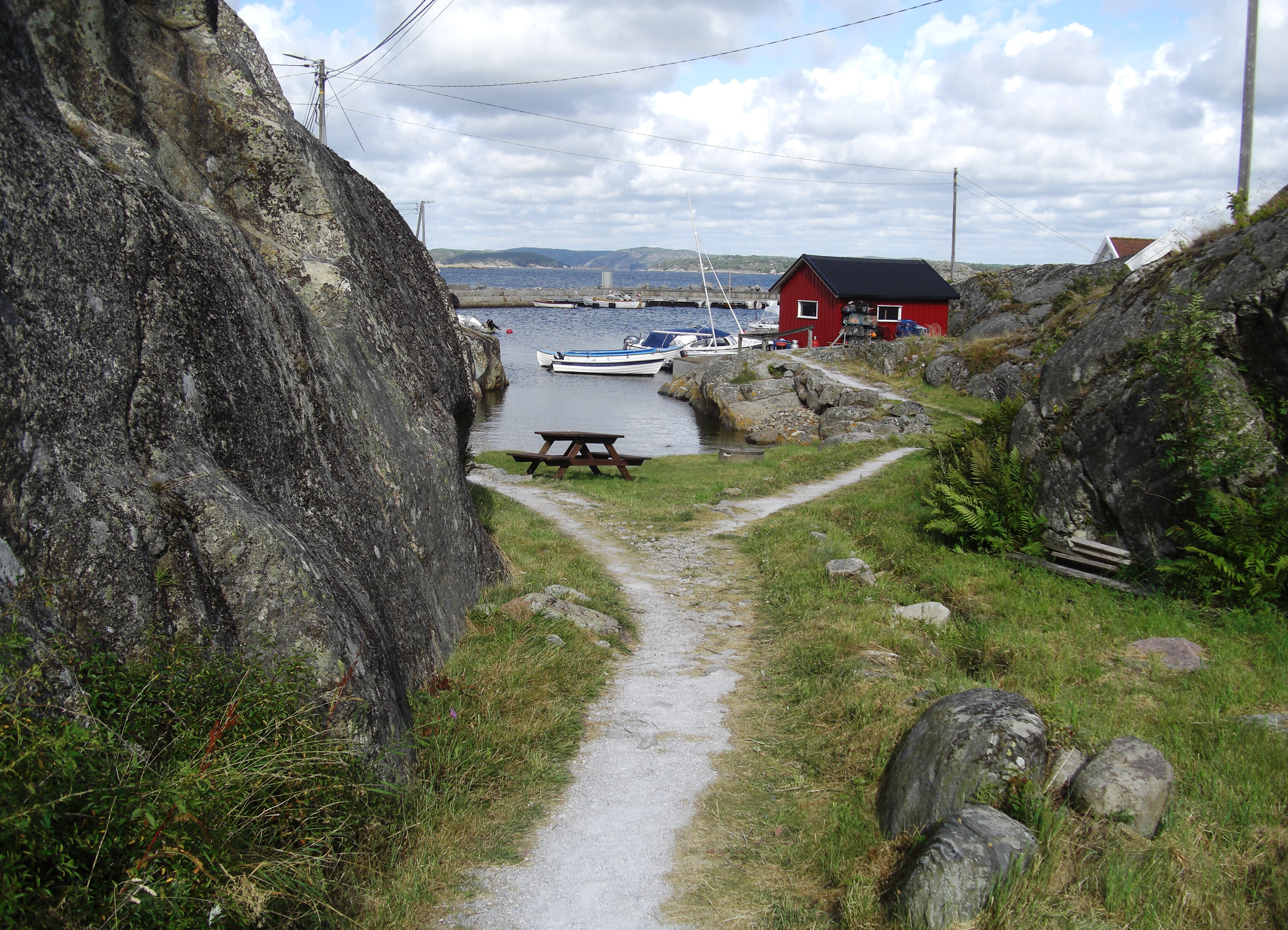
Lauer island

Lauer is a small island in the Hvaler municipality in South-East Norway. The Hvaler islands are located in the Oslofjord, not far from the border with Sweden.

The island was first settled in the 17th century. Today, there are around 30 homes on Lauer, used as vacation homes in the summer only. Up until the 1980s, the island was inhabited all year round. There is a cottage for hire on the island.

There is a ferry service operated to Lauer by Hollungen from the mainland port of Skjærhalden.
