= Christmas flood =

Christmas flood may refer to:

- Christmas Flood of 1717 in the Netherlands, Germany and Scandinavia
- Christmas flood of 1964 in western North America
