= Tisler =

Island in Norway

Coordinates: 58°59′N 10°57′E

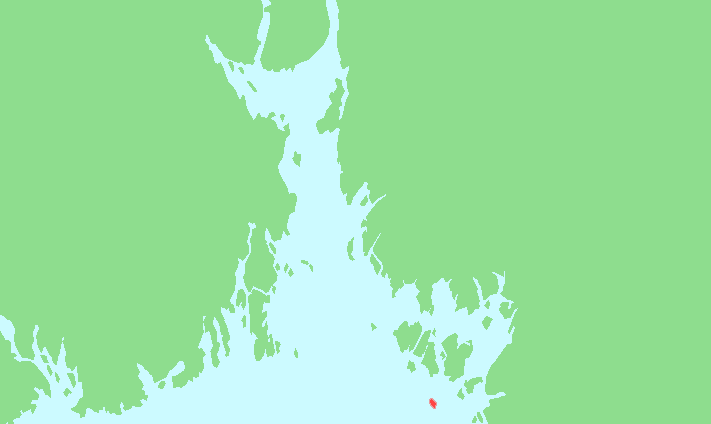
Map of Tisler

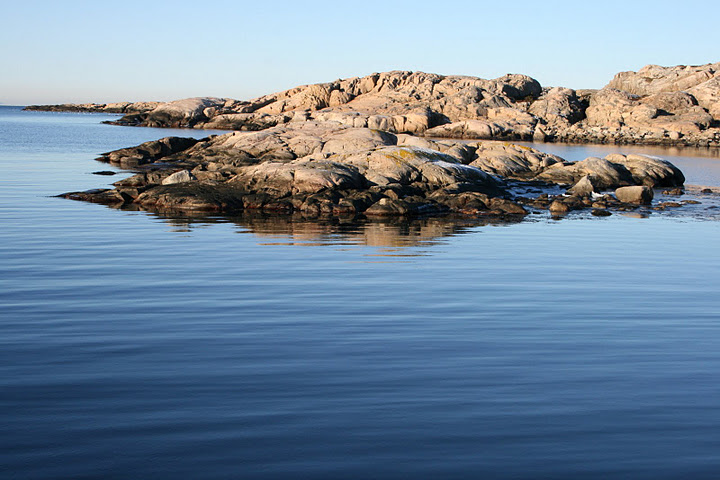
Tisler in Ytre Hvaler National Park

Tisler is a small island in southeast Norway. The name of the island comes from the Norse word for thistle, þistill, or tistel in Norwegian, coming from the round shape of the thistle's pericarp. Tisler is among the southernmost of the Hvaler islands, which form a municipality in Østfold. Tisler is one of the last islands before you reach Sweden and Skagerrak. The last family of farmers and fishermen moved from the island to Skjærhalden in 1939. Today, Tisler is not inhabited except for the summer, when many people come to their cottages to enjoy the sun and the warm climate.

== See also ==
- Ytre Hvaler National Park
