= Akerøya =

Island in Norway

Coordinates: 59.048°N 10.884°E

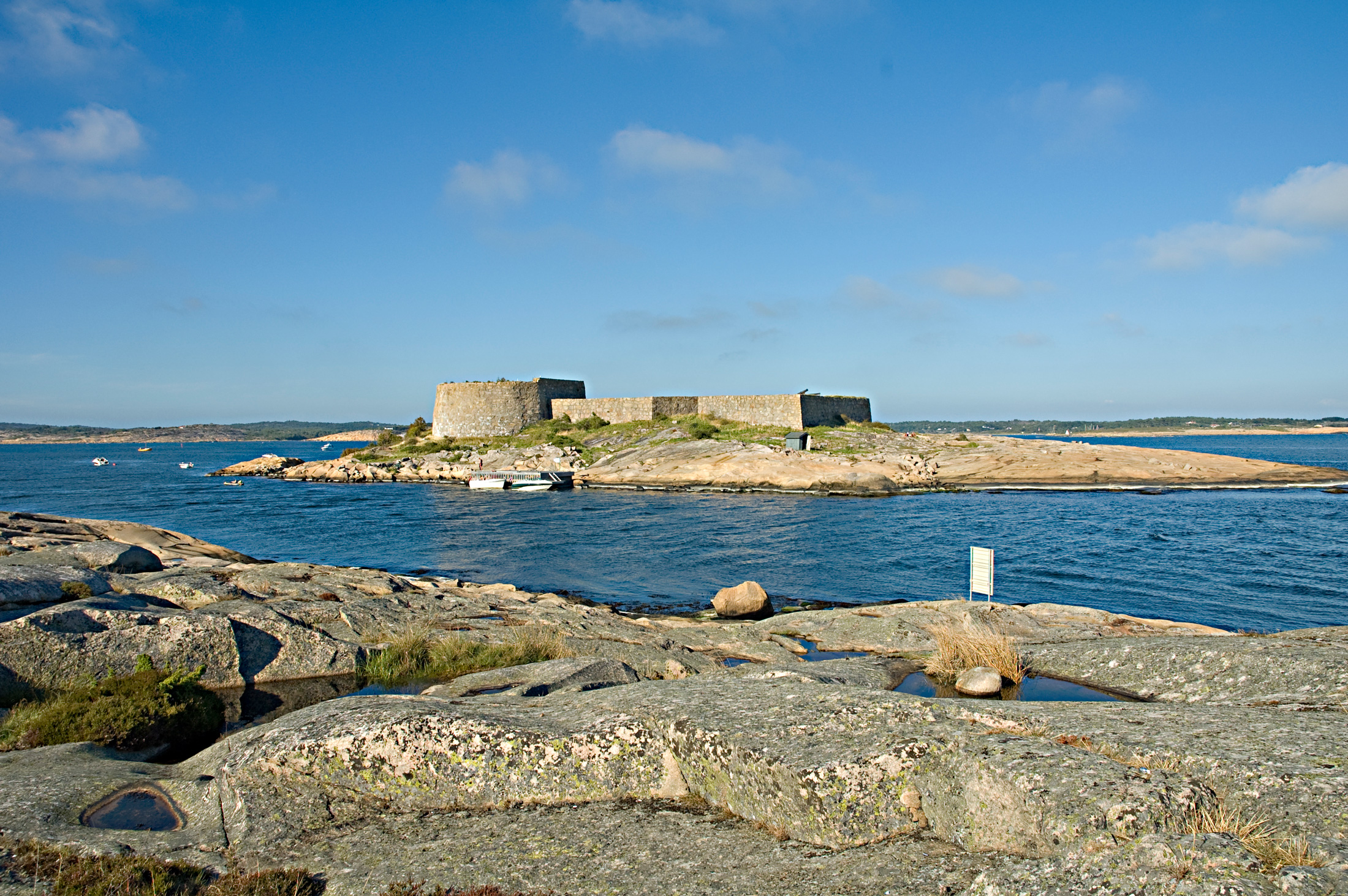
Akerøya Fort on Festningsholmen

Akerøya is an uninhabited island in the Hvaler island chain in Østfold, Norway. The island has an area of 1.6 km^{2}. On the islet Festningholmen near Akerøya is Akerøya Fort which from the 17th century was part of the fortifications of Fredrikstad Fortress. Akerøya was protected as a nature reserve from 1978, and is included in the Ytre Hvaler National Park from 2009.
