= Vikerhavn =

- Village
- Interactive map of Vikerhavn
- Coordinates: 59°02′16″N 10°56′53″E
- Time zone: UTC+01:00 (CET)

Vikerhavn is a small fishing harbour and village on the southern part of the island Asmaløy in the Hvaler municipality of Østfold county, Norway.
