= Skagerrak =

Sea between Denmark, Norway and Sweden

- Location within Europe

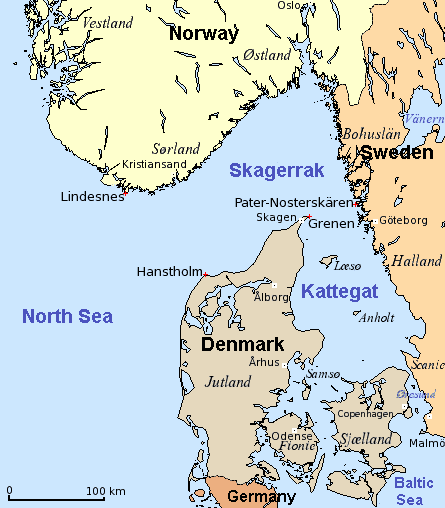
- Skagerrak and Kattegat
- Location: North Sea–Kattegat (Atlantic Ocean)
- Coordinates: 58°N 9°E
- Type: Strait
- Basin countries: Denmark; Norway; Sweden
- Surface area: 47,000 km^{2} (18,000 sq mi)
- Average depth: 200 metres (660 ft)
- Max. depth: 700 metres (2,300 ft)

The Skagerrak (/ˈskæɡəræk/; Danish: [ˈskɛːjɐʁɑk], Norwegian: [ˈskɑ̀ːɡərɑk], Swedish: [ˈskɑ̌ːɡɛrak]) is a strait running between the North Jutlandic Island of Denmark, the east coast of Norway and the west coast of Sweden, connecting the North Sea and the Kattegat sea.

The Skagerrak contains some of the busiest shipping routes in the world, with vessels from every corner of the globe. It also supports an intensive fishing industry. The ecosystem is strained and negatively affected by direct human activities. Oslo and Gothenburg are the only large cities in the Skagerrak region.

The strait is likely named after Skagen, a town near the northern cape of Denmark, with 'Rak' meaning 'straight waterway'. The Skagerrak is 240 km long and 80–140 km wide, deepening towards the Norwegian coast. It has an average salinity comparable to other coastal waters, housing a variety of habitats.

Historically, the Skagerrak was the only access to the Baltic Sea until the construction of the Eider Canal in 1784. During both World Wars, the strait held strategic importance for Germany. Presently, it remains one of the busiest straits worldwide.

The Skagerrak is a habitat for approximately 2,000 marine species, including a unique variety of Atlantic cod. It also contains sandy and stony reefs and cold-water coral reefs. Environmental institutions have expressed concern about increasing pressure on the ecosystem due to human activities and climate change. Protections are in place, with several marine protected areas in Skagerrak, including Ytre Hvaler National Park in Norway and Kosterhavet National Park in Sweden.

== Name ==
The meaning of Skagerrak is most likely the Skagen Channel/Strait. Skagen is a town near the northern cape of Denmark (The Skaw). In Dutch, rak means 'straight waterway', as seen in Dutch hydronyms such as Damrak, Gouderak, Langerak, Tuikwerderrak, and Volkerak), cognate with reach. The ultimate source of this syllable is the Proto-Indo-European root *reg-, 'straight'. Rak means 'straight' as in 'straight ahead' in modern Norwegian and Swedish. Råk in both modern Norwegian and Swedish refers to a channel or opening of water in an otherwise ice-covered body of water. There is no evidence to suggest a connection with the modern Danish word rak (meaning rabble or riff-raff). It is therefore likely that the Skagerrak was named by Dutch seafarers, as was the adjacent Kattegat.

== Geography ==
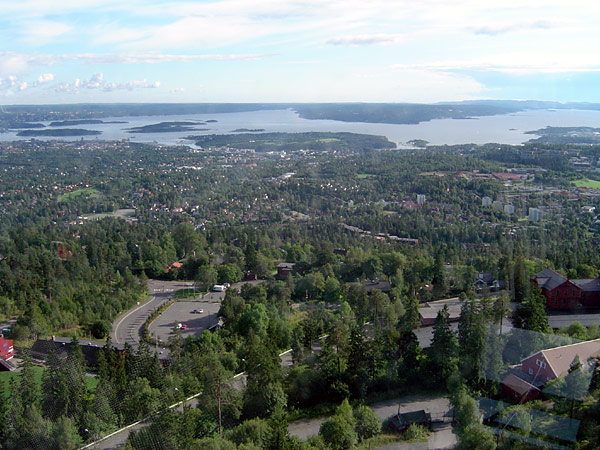
The Oslofjord inlet near Oslo is part of the Skagerrak strait.

The Skagerrak is 240 km (150 mi) long and between 80 and 140 km (50 and 87 mi) wide. It deepens toward the Norwegian coast, reaching over 700 m at the Norwegian Trench. Some ports along the Skagerrak are Oslo, Larvik and Kristiansand in Norway, Skagen, Hirtshals and Hanstholm in Denmark and Uddevalla, Lysekil and Strömstad in Sweden.

The area available to biomass is about 3,600 km^{2} (1,400 sq mi) and includes a wide variety of habitats, from shallow sandy and stony reefs in Sweden and Denmark to the depths of the Norwegian trench.

=== Extent ===
Skagerrak

The International Hydrographic Organization defines the limits of the Skagerrak as follows:

On the West. A line joining Hanstholm (57°07′N 8°36′E) and the Naze (Lindesnes, 58°N 7°E). On the Southeast. The Northern limit of the Kattegat [A line joining Skagen (The Skaw, North Point of Denmark) and Paternosterskären (57°54′N 11°27′E) and thence Northeastward through the shoals to Tjörn Island].

== History ==
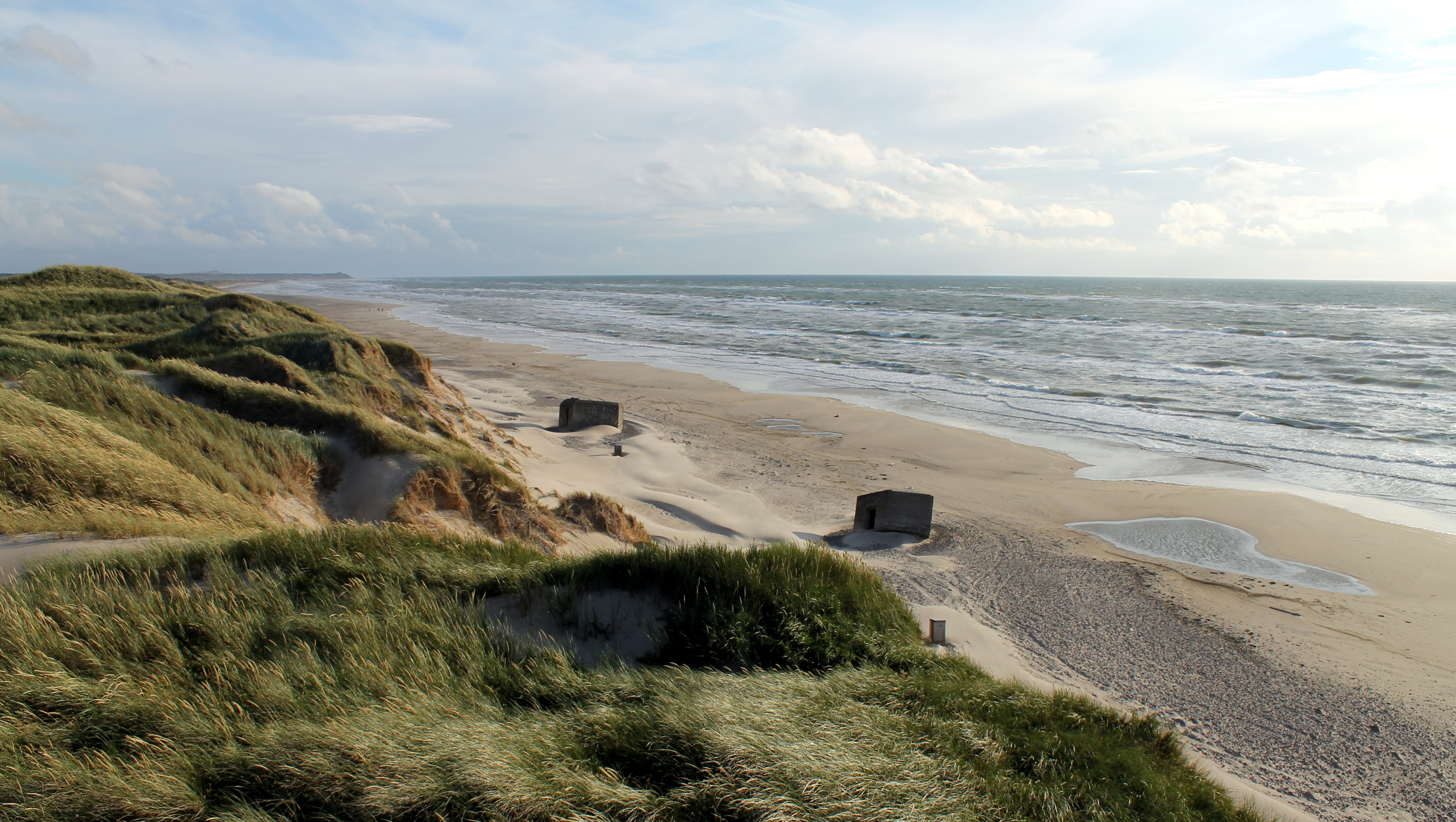
German bunkers from World War II are still present along the coasts of Skagerrak. (Kjærsgård Strand in Denmark)

Older names for the combined Skagerrak and Kattegat were the Norwegian Sea or Jutland Sea; the latter appears in the Knýtlinga saga.

Until the construction of the Eider Canal in 1784 (a predecessor to the Kiel Canal), Skagerrak was the only way in and out of the Baltic Sea. For this reason, the strait has had busy international traffic for centuries. After the Industrial Revolution, the traffic increased and today Skagerrak is among the busiest straits in the world. In 1862, a short cut, the Thyborøn Channel at the Limfjord was constructed in Denmark through Skagerrak from the North Sea by going directly to the Kattegat. The Limfjord supports only minor transports though.

In both world wars, the Skagerrak was strategically very important for Germany. The biggest sea battle of the First World War, the Battle of Jutland, also known as the Battle of the Skagerrak, took place here May 31 to June 1, 1916. In the Second World War, the importance of controlling this waterway, the only sea access to the Baltic, was the motive for the German invasions of Denmark and Norway as well as the construction of the northern parts of the Atlantic Wall. Both of these naval engagements have contributed to the large number of shipwrecks in the Skagerrak.

== Traffic and industry ==
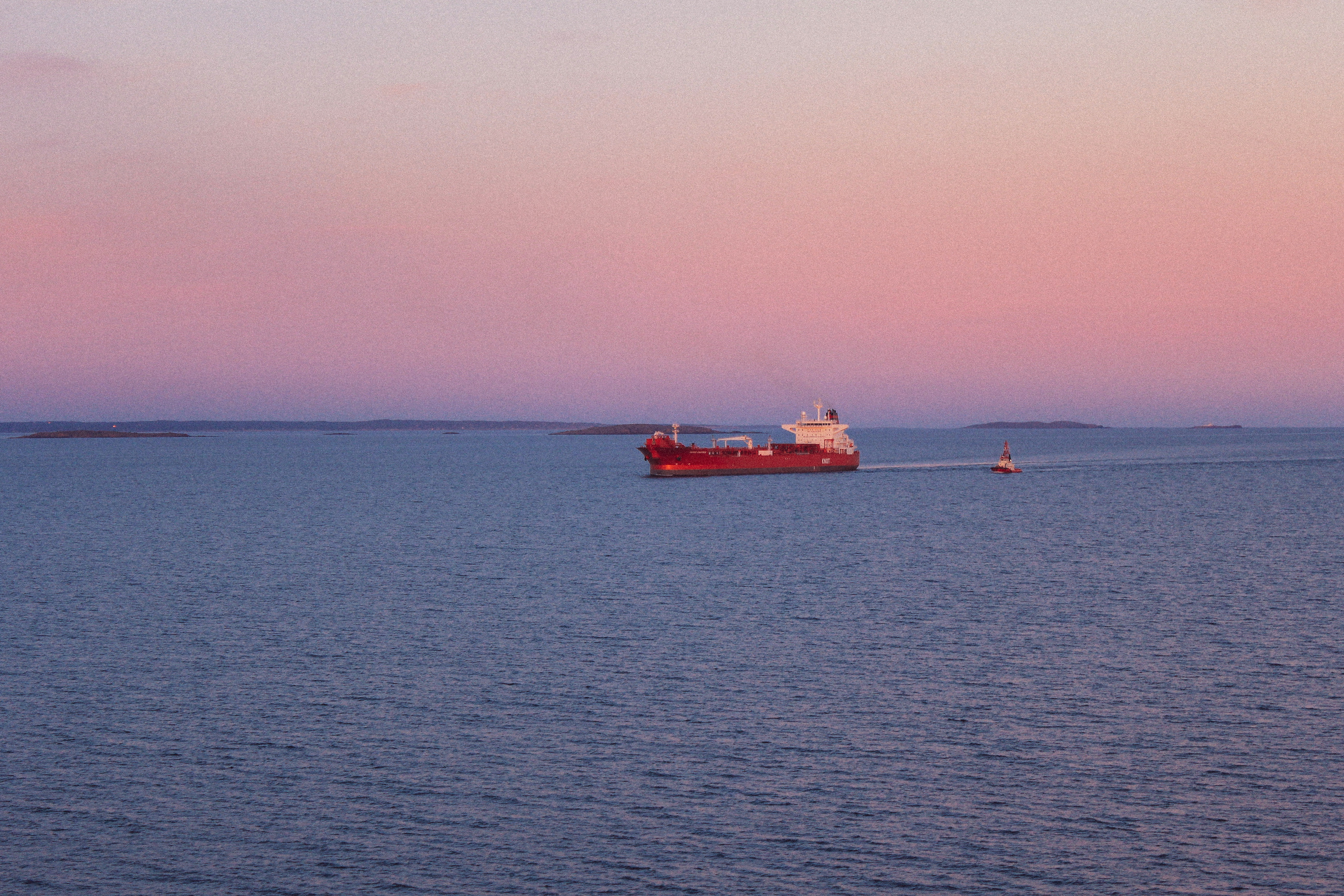
A cargo ship on Skagerrak

Skagerrak is a busy shipping lane, with c. 7,500 individual vessels (excluding fishing vessels) from all over the world visiting in 2013 alone. Cargo ships are by far the most common vessel in Skagerrak at c. 4,000 individual ships in 2013, followed by tankers, which are nearly half as frequent. When viewed in combination with the Baltic Sea area, ships from 122 different nationalities visited in 2013, with most of these carrying cargo or passengers within Europe, regardless of their flag state.

Nearly all commercial vessels in Skagerrak are tracked by the Automatic Identification System (AIS).

== Recreation ==
Skagerrak is popular for recreational activities in all three countries. There are many summer house residences and several marinas along the coasts.

== Biology ==
The Skagerrak is habitat for approximately 2,000 marine species, many of them adapted to its waters. For example, a variety of Atlantic cod called the Skagerrak cod spawns off the Norwegian coast. The eggs are buoyant and the hatchlings feed on zooplankton. Juveniles sink to the bottom where they have a shorter maturity cycle (2 years). They do not migrate but remain local to Norwegian fjords.

The variety of habitats and the large volume of plankton on the surface support prolific marine life. Energy moves from the top to the bottom according to Vinogradov's ladder of migrations; that is, some species are benthic and others pelagic, but there are graded marine layers within which species move vertically for short distances. In addition, some species are benthopelagic, moving between surface and bottom. The benthic species include Coryphaenoides rupestris, Argentina silus, Etmopterus spinax, Chimaera monstrosa and Glyptocephalus cynoglossus. On the top are Clupea harengus, Scomber scombrus, Sprattus sprattus. Some species that move between are Pandalus borealis, Sabinea sarsi, Etmopterus spinax.

=== Reefs ===
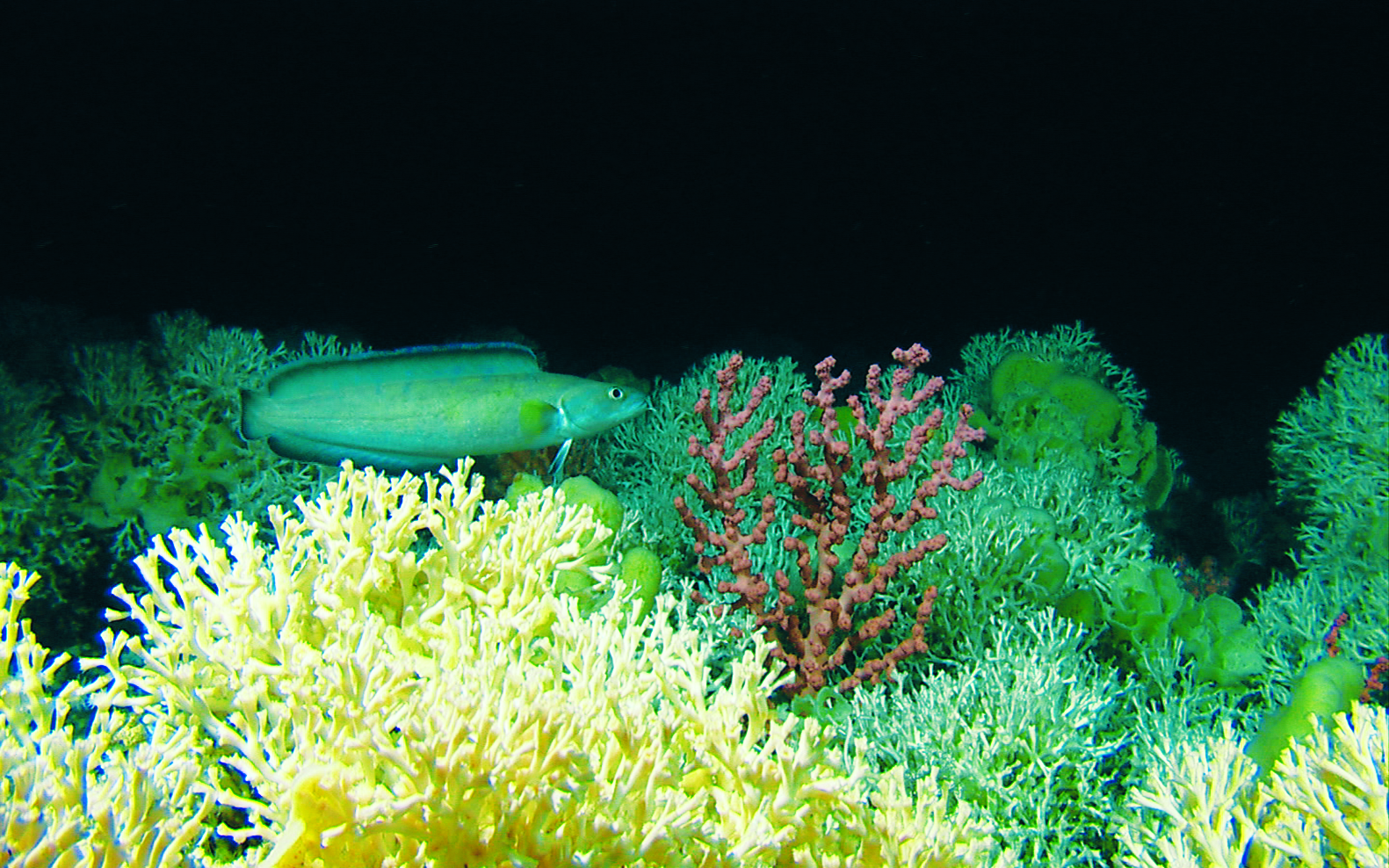
A cold water coral reef in Norway

Apart from sandy and stony reefs, extensive cold water coral reefs, mostly of Lophelia, are growing in Skagerrak. The Säcken Reef in the Swedish marine protection of Koster Fjord is an ancient cold water coral reef and the only known coral reef in the country. The Tisler Reef in the Norwegian marine protection of Ytre Hvaler National Park is the largest known coral reef in Europe. Lophelia reefs are also present in the Norwegian trench and they are known from the shallow waters of many Norwegian fjords.

Skagerrak also holds a number of rare bubbling reefs; biological reefs formed around cold seeps of geological carbohydrate outgassings, usually methane. These rare habitats are mostly known from the Danish waters of Skagerrak west of Hirtshals, but more might be discovered in future surveys. Bubbling reefs are very rare in Europe and supports a very varied ecosystem.

With the centuries-long heavy international seatraffic of Skagerrak, the seabed also holds an abundance of shipwrecks. Wrecks on shallow waters, provides a firm anchoring for several corals and polyps and explored wrecks have been revealed to support Dead Man's Fingers corals, Brittle stars and large wolffish. A 2020 seafloor mapping project around Jammerbugten in Skaggerak, ran by Danish explorer Klaus Thymann, found evidence of much greater biodiversity in a range seafloor habitats previously thought to be sandy with a low density of wildlife. Dead Man’s Fingers corals were again among the species documented for the first time in these coastal habitats.

== Environmental concerns ==
Scientists and environmental institutions have expressed concern about the increasing pressure on the ecosystem in Skagerrak. The pressure has already had negative impacts and is caused by cumulative environmental effects, of which direct human activities are only one piece of the puzzle. Climate change and ocean acidification are expected to have increasing impacts on the Skagerrak ecosystem in the future.

Skagerrak and the North Sea receives considerable inputs of hazardous material and radioactive substances. Most is ascribed to long-range transport from other countries, but not all. Marine litter is also a growing problem. Until recently, waste water and sewage pouring into Skagerrak from settlements and industries was not treated at all. In combination with wash out of excessive nutrients from conventional farming, this has often led to large algae blooms.

== Protections ==
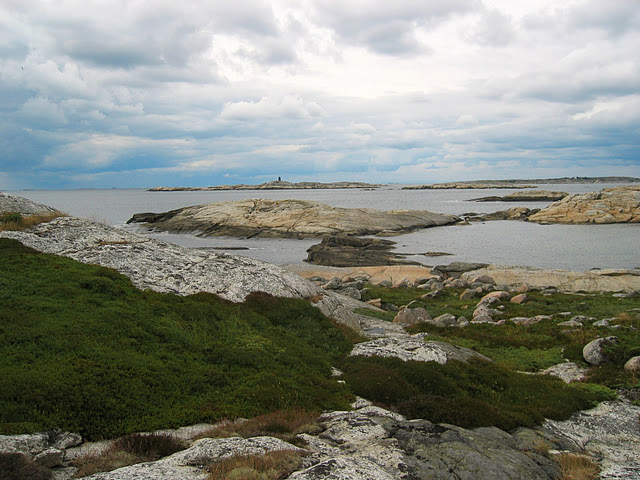
Ytre Hvaler National Park

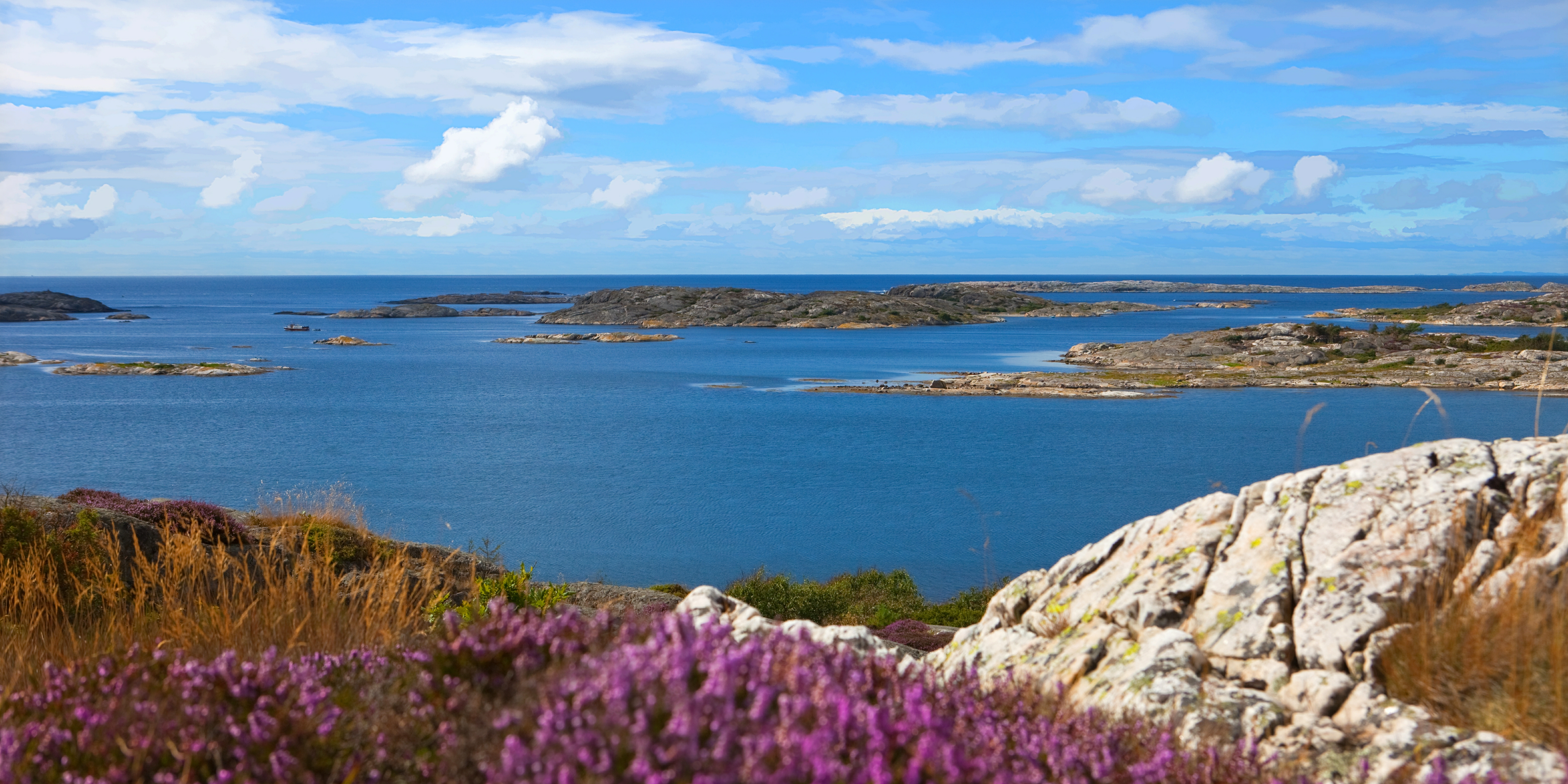
Kosterhavet National Park.

The two national parks of Ytre-Hvaler and Kosterhavet, forms a connected cross-border protection between Norway and Sweden.

There are several marine protections in Skagerrak, including:

Norway

- Ytre Hvaler National Park, established on 26 June 2009
- Raet National Park, established on 16 December 2016

Sweden

- Kosterhavet National Park
- Bratten, a newly designated 120,878.4-hectare (298,697-acre) Natura 2000 sea area beyond Kosterhavet. Pockmarks and biogenic reefs at depths of 200–500 metres (660–1,640 ft).
- Gullmarsfjorden, Sweden's first marine conservation area from 1983.

Denmark

- Grenen and a 270,295-hectare (667,910-acre) sea area immediately north.

== In popular culture ==
Skagerrak is the setting of the popular television show Badehotellet from Denmark.

== See also ==
- Danish Straits
