= Hvaler Fjordcruise =

Norwegian ferry company

Hvaler Fjordcruise AS
- Type: Private
- Industry: Ship transport
- Founded: 2001
- Headquarters: Hvaler, Norway
- Area served: Hvaler
- Website: www.hvalerfjordcruise.no

Hvaler Fjordcruise AS is a company that operates a passenger ferry between Skjærhalden in Hvaler, Norway and Strømstad, Sweden.

== History ==
The company was founded after the privatization of Hvaler Båt- og Fergeselskap in 2001, and operates one ship, MS Vesleø II.
