= Hvaler Tunnel =

Subsea road tunnel in Viken, Norway

Coordinates: 59°02′07″N 10°58′33″E

The Hvaler Tunnel (Norwegian: Hvalertunnelen) is a subsea road tunnel which connects the island of Kirkøy to the rest of Hvaler in Østfold County, Norway. The tunnel opened in 1989 and is 3,751 meters (12,306 ft) long and 120 meters (390 ft) deep with an incline of 10% at its steepest point, located on Norwegian County Road 108.

== History ==
Prior to the tunnel, services were provided by Hvaler Båt- og Fergeselskap. In 1986, Hvalertunnelen AS was established to take up a loan to build the tunnel, and pay the loan through collected toll fares. Tolls started at 130 Norwegian krone (NOK) and ended at 154 by 2007, when the loan was paid off. For another two years, a NOK 20 fee was collected to finance a bicycle path on the island. Since 22 April 2010, it is possible to make mobile telephone calls from the tunnel.
