= HDMS Lossen (1684) =

History

Denmark–Norway
- Name: Lossen
- Builder: Isegran, Fredrikstad
- Launched: 1684
- Fate: Wrecked, 1717

General characteristics
- Class & type: frigate
- Propulsion: Sails

Lossen was a frigate built for the navy of Denmark–Norway at Isegran, Fredrikstad, Norway, and launched in 1684.

Lossen was wrecked during the Christmas storm of 1717, outside the island Vesteroyen (in norwegian Vesterøy) in Hvaler, Norway. Nearly half of the crew of 103 perished.

The wreck was found in 1963, and explored by the Norwegian Maritime Museum in 1967, 1968, and 1974.
