= Eivind N. Borge =

Norwegian politician (born 1950)

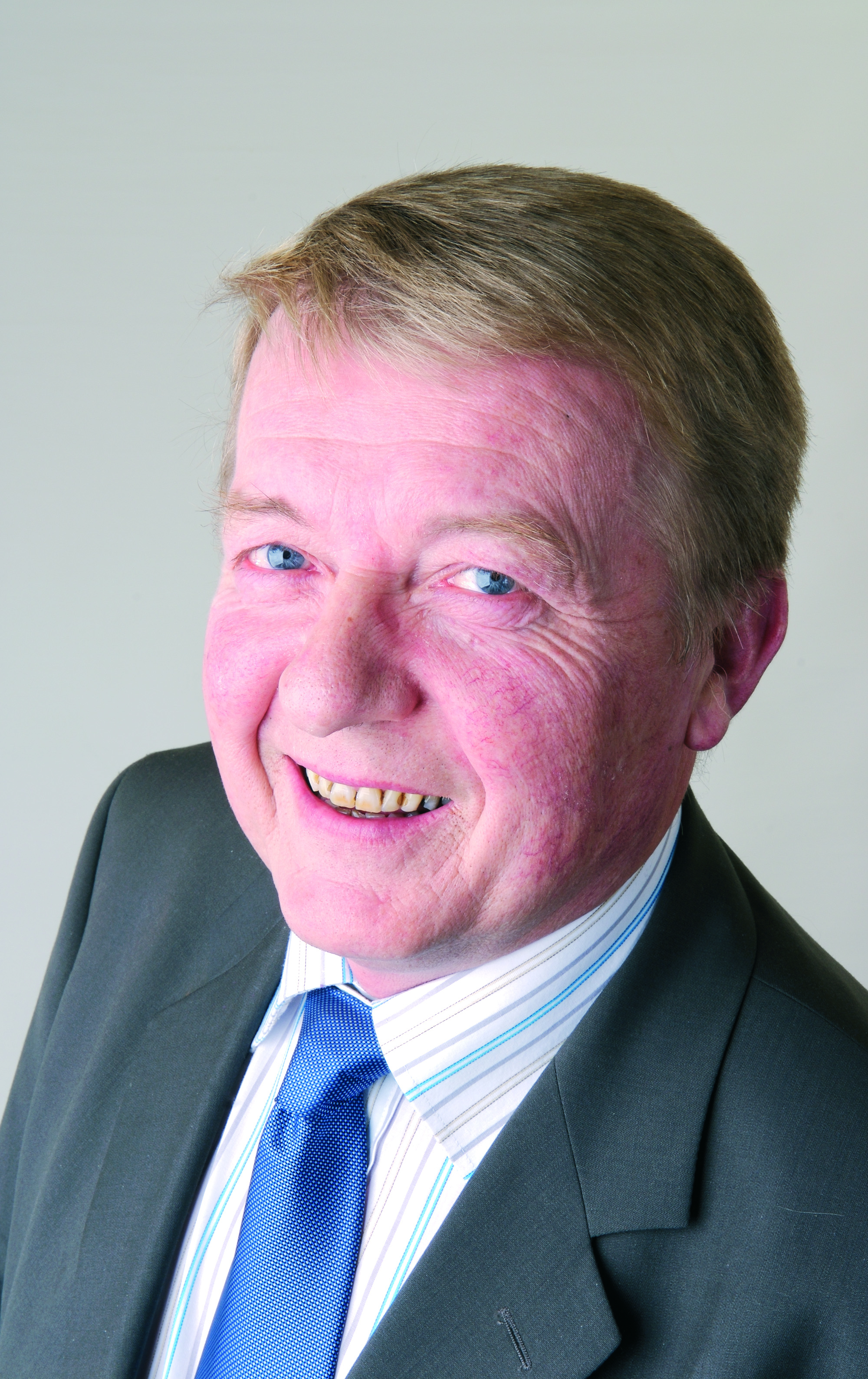
Eivind N. Borge

Eivind N. Borge (born 24 February 1950) is a Norwegian politician for the Progress Party.

He served as a deputy representative to the Norwegian Parliament from Østfold during the term 2005–2009.

On the local level Borge is the mayor of Hvaler municipality since 2007.
