= Torbjørnskjær Lighthouse =

Coastal lighthouse in Norway

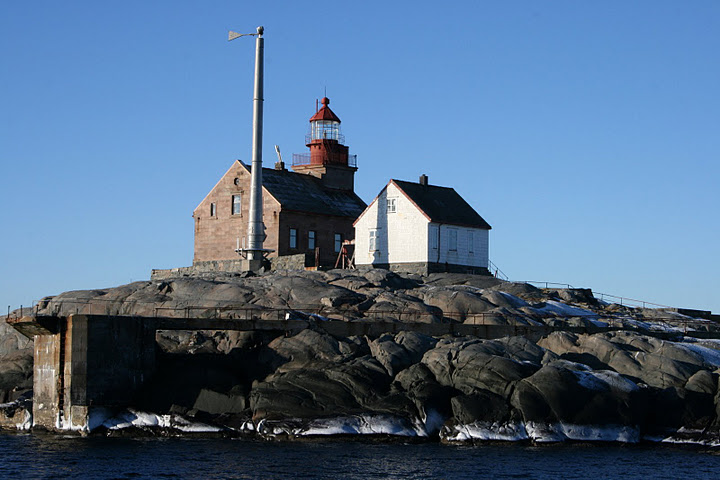
- Location: Hvaler, Norway
- Coordinates: 59°00′N 10°47′E

Tower
- Constructed: 1872
- Construction: granite
- Automated: 1990
- Height: 17.9 m (59 ft)
- Shape: square
- Markings: Unpainted (house), red (lantern)
- Power source: solar energy
- Heritage: cultural property

Light
- Focal height: 25.7 m (84 ft)
- Lens: third order Fresnel lens
- Range: 15 nmi (28 km; 17 mi)
- Characteristic: Fl W 10s

Torbjørnskjær Lighthouse (Norwegian: Torbjørnskjær fyr, Urban East Norwegian: [ˈtʊ̂rbjøːɳʂæːr ˈfyːr]) is a fully automated coastal lighthouse situated on a skerry in the archipelago of Hvaler Municipality in Norway. It marks the east side of the entrance to the Oslofjord, with Færder Lighthouse marking the west side. The light is powered by solar power. Landing conditions are very difficult, and nowadays service calls are made via helicopter. The lighthouse and surrounding buildings, which include residences, outhouse, a well, and engine house are proposed protected as a national park.

== See also ==
- List of lighthouses in Norway
- Lighthouses in Norway
