= Homlungen Lighthouse =

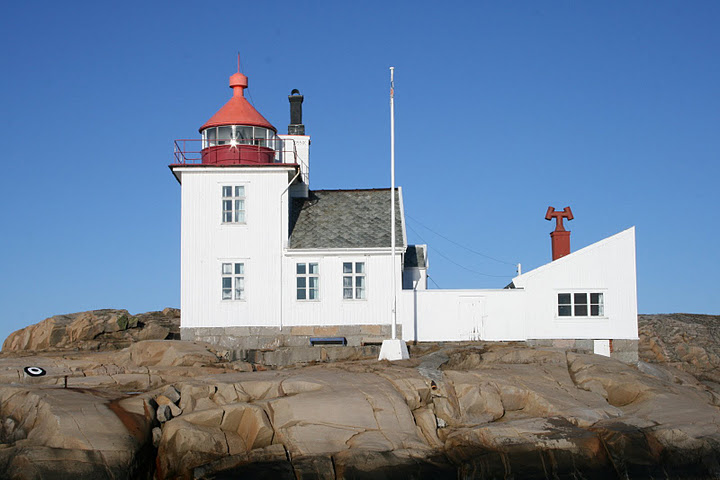
- Location: Hvaler; Østfold; Norway
- Coordinates: 59.016085°N 11.024394°E

Tower
- Constructed: 1867
- Foundation: granite
- Construction: wood
- Automated: 1952
- Height: 12 metres (39 ft)
- Shape: square tower integral with house
- Markings: white tower, red lantern
- Operator: Oslofjorden Friluftsråd (Homlungen)
- Heritage: cultural property

Light
- Focal height: 13.5 metres (44 ft)
- Lens: 4° order Fresnel lens
- Range: 12 nautical miles (22 km; 14 mi)
- Characteristic: Oc WRG 6s.

Homlungen Lighthouse (Norwegian: Homlungen fyr) is a fully automated leading lighthouse situated on a skerry in the archipelago municipality of Hvaler, Norway. The lighthouse and surrounding buildings, which include residences, outhouse, a well, and engine house are proposed protected as a national park.

== See also ==
- List of lighthouses in Norway
- Lighthouses in Norway
