= Egil Abrahamsen =

Norwegian ships engineer (1923–2023)

- Born: 7 February 1923; Hvaler, Norway
- Died: 14 April 2023 (aged 100); Oslo, Norway
- Education: Norwegian Institute of Technology
- Occupation: Ships engineer
- Employer: Det Norske Veritas
- Awards: Order of St. Olav (1988)

Egil Abrahamsen (7 February 1923 – 14 April 2023) was a Norwegian ships engineer.

== Biography ==
Abrahamsen was born in Hvaler on 7 February 1923. He graduated from the Norwegian Institute of Technology in 1949. He was assigned with Det Norske Veritas from 1952, where he served as CEO from 1967 to 1985. From 1985 to 1992 he was chairman of the board of Norsk Hydro. He became a member of the Norwegian Academy of Technological Sciences from 1968. He was elected a member of the US National Academy of Engineering in 1978 for contributions to improved design of ship structures and leadership in international technical affairs. He was decorated Commander of the Order of St. Olav in 1988. Abrahamsen died in Oslo on 14 April 2023, at the age of 100.
