= Langerak =

Langerak may refer to

== Geography ==
=== Netherlands ===
- Langerak, Drenthe, a place in the municipality of Coevorden
- Langerak, Gelderland, a township in the municipality of Doetinchem
- Langerak, South Holland, a place in the municipality of Molenwaard
- Willige Langerak, a place in the Utrecht municipality of Lopik

=== Denmark ===
- Langerak (fjord), the eastern part of Limfjorden between Aalborg and Hals

== People ==
- Michel Langerak (born 1968), Dutch footballer
- Mitchell Langerak (born 1988), Australian football goalkeeper
