= Kirkeøy =

Island in Norway

Coordinates: 59°03′N 11°02′E

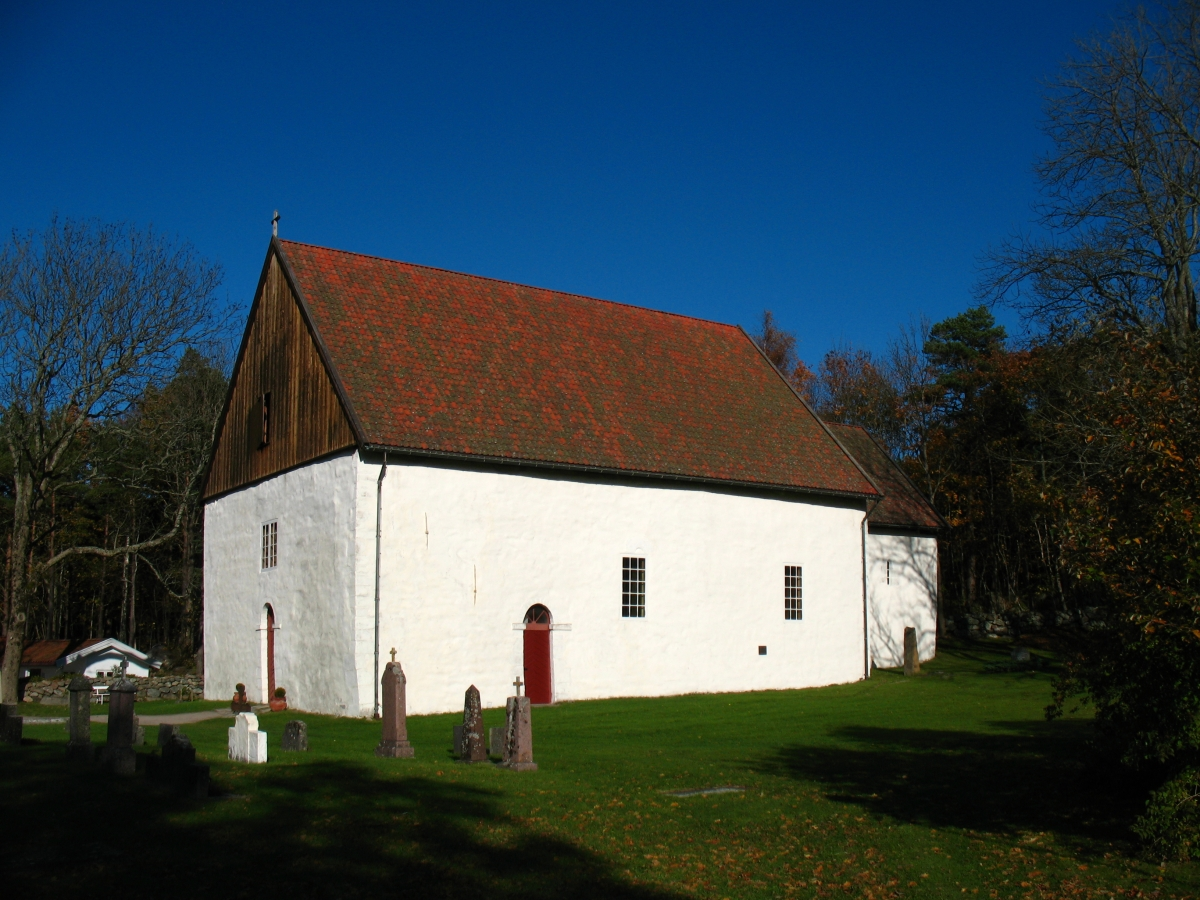
Hvaler Church on Kirkeøy

Kirkeøy is the largest island in the Norwegian municipality of Hvaler. Its name means "church island" and is derived from Hvaler Church which is on the island and is also the main church of the municipality. The island covers an area of 29.6 square kilometres (11.4 sq mi) and had a population of 1345 inhabitants as of 2017.

Like the other Hvaler islands, Kirkeøy's topography is marked by granite outcrops, several inlets, and mixed forest dominated by Scots pine and silver birch. At the southern end of the island lies the village of Skjærhalden, which is also the administrative centre of the municipality. There are several holiday cottages on the island, which is a popular destination for tourists in the summer. The island is connected with the mainland through a 1.8 kilometres (1.1 mi) long tunnel to Asmaløy. From Asmaløy there are bridges to Fredrikstad.

Hvaler Church (Hvaler Kirke) is a medieval era church, probably begun about 1000–1100; it is the main church of the archipelago. It is a stone church with a rectangular nave and narrow choir and apse. The pulpit is from the 1600s. In 1750, the church received a new altar which, in 1759, was supplemented with an altarpiece mounted on the altar. Between 1953 and 1955, the church went through a thorough restoration led by antiquarian Håkon Christie in connection with the church's restoration. The J. H. Jorgensen organ is from 1955.
