= Christmas Flood of 1717 =

December 1717 North Sea storm

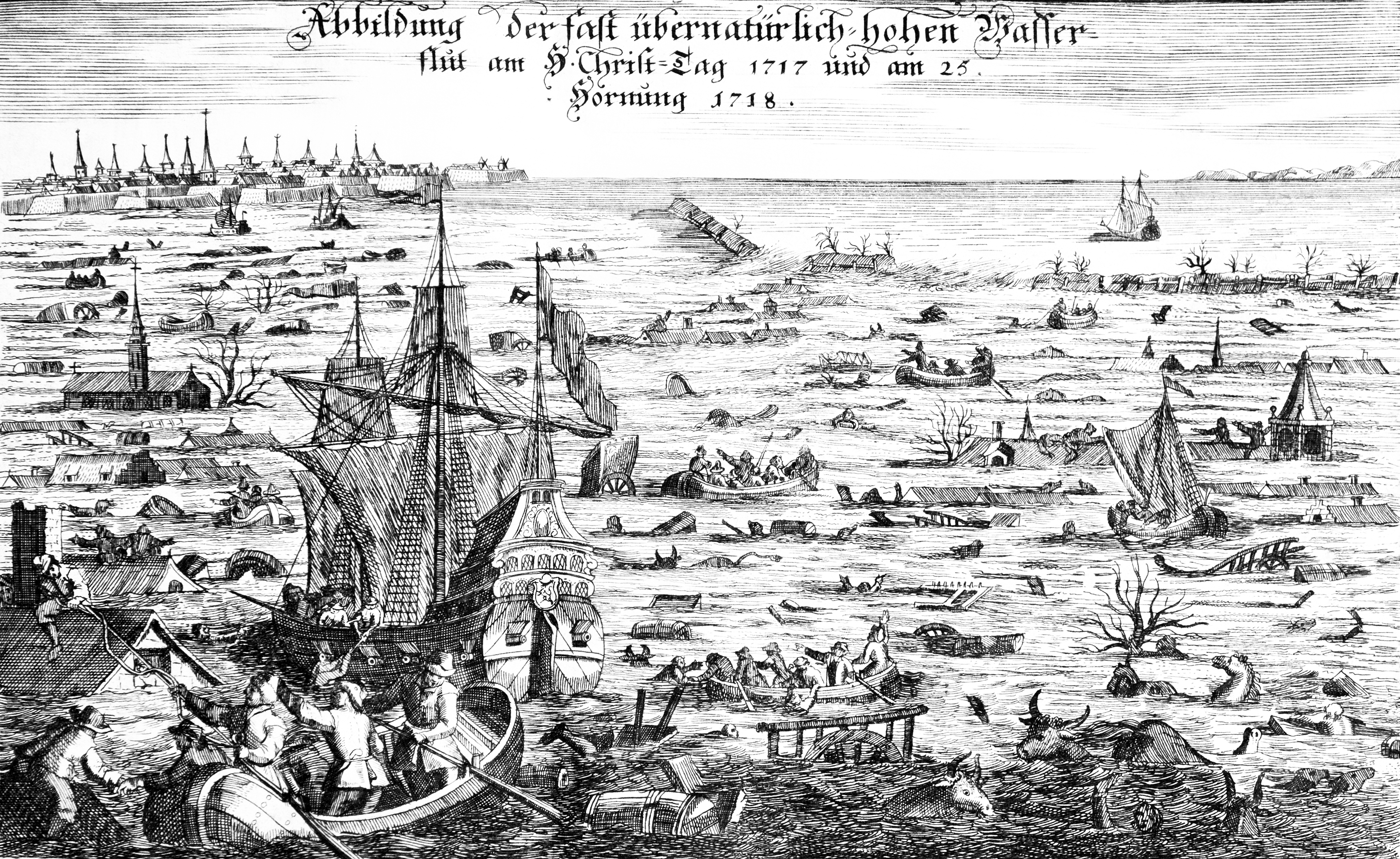
- A depiction of the Christmas Flood

Meteorological history
- Duration: 25 December 1717

Overall effects
- Fatalities: 14,000
- Areas affected: Netherlands, Germany and Scandinavia

The Christmas Flood of 1717 was the result of a northwesterly storm, which hit the coast area of the Netherlands, Germany, and Scandinavia on Christmas night of 1717. In total, about 14,000 people drowned.

It was the last large storm flood in the north of the Netherlands. Floodwaters reached the towns and cities of Groningen, Zwolle, Dokkum, Amsterdam, and Haarlem. Many villages near the sea were devastated entirely, such as in the west of Vlieland and villages behind the sea dykes in Groningen Province.

The local communities had to cope with population loss, economic decline, and poverty. No area of the coast between the Netherlands and Denmark was spared. Everywhere, dyke breaches were followed by wide flooding of the flat country. Between Tønder in Slesvig and Emden in East Frisia, about 9,000 people drowned. The Netherlands had 2,500 victims. The worse-affected areas were in the County of Oldenburg, around Jever, Kehdingen, and the principality of East Frisia. Butjadingen lost 30% of its population. In all the affected coastal areas, a large number of cattle were lost. In East Frisia, 900 houses were washed away completely. The damage to dykes and sluices was immense. Survivors remained unaware of the fate of missing family members for a long time. For example, of 284 persons missing from Werdum in East Frisia, only 32 of them had been found by 5 February 1718. The impact of this storm flood in the cold winter time—two days after this flood came hard frost and snowfall—was worsened on the night of 25 or 26 February by another storm flood.

== See also ==
- HDMS Lossen
