= Herføl =

Island in Hvaler, Norway

Coordinates: 59°00′N 11°03′E

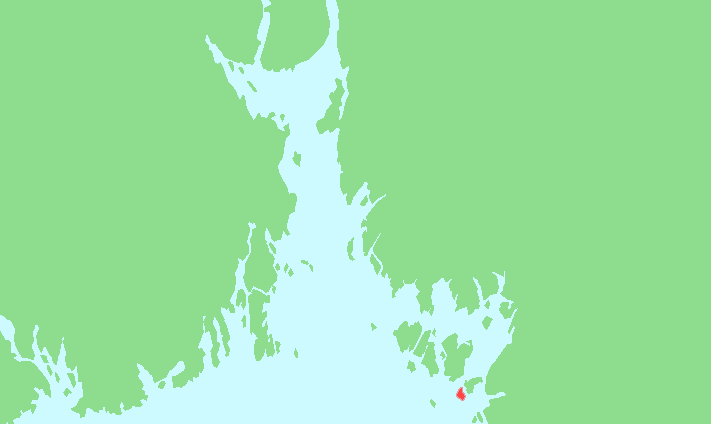
Map of Herføl

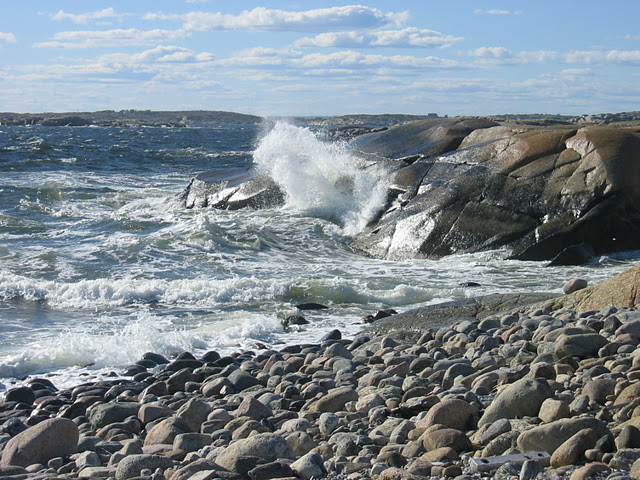
Herføl in Ytre Hvaler National Park

Herføl is a sparsely populated, wooded island in the municipality of Hvaler in Østfold, Norway. The island has an area of 1,9 km^{2} and is designated with postal code 1690.

== See also ==
- Ytre Hvaler National Park
