= Skjærhalden =

Administrative centre of Hvaler municipality, Norway

Coordinates: 59°02′N 11°02′E

Skjærhalden is the administrative centre of Hvaler municipality, Norway. It is located on the island Kirkeøy, location of the Ytre Hvaler National Park center. Its population (SSB 2005) is 642.

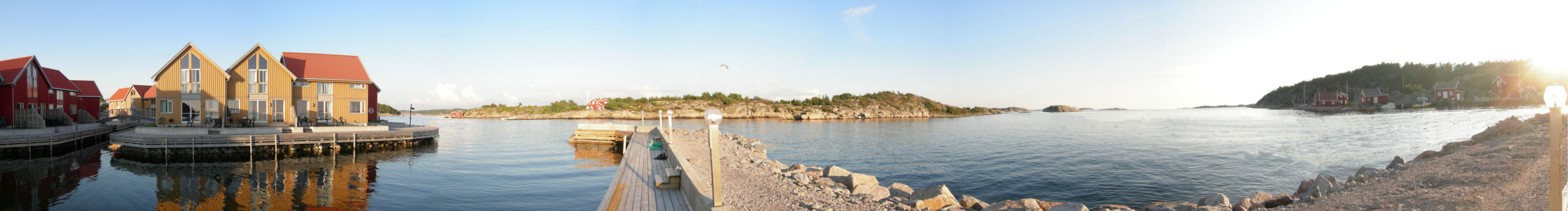

== Sources ==
- Stokke, Knut Bjørn; Haukeland, Jan Vidar (2018-10-15). "Balancing tourism development and nature protection across national park borders – a case study of a coastal protected area in Norway" (PDF). Journal of Environmental Planning and Management. 61 (12): 2151–2165. doi:10.1080/09640568.2017.1388772. ISSN 0964-0568.
