= Hvaler =

Municipality in Østfold, Norway

Hvaler Municipality Hvaler kommune
- Municipality
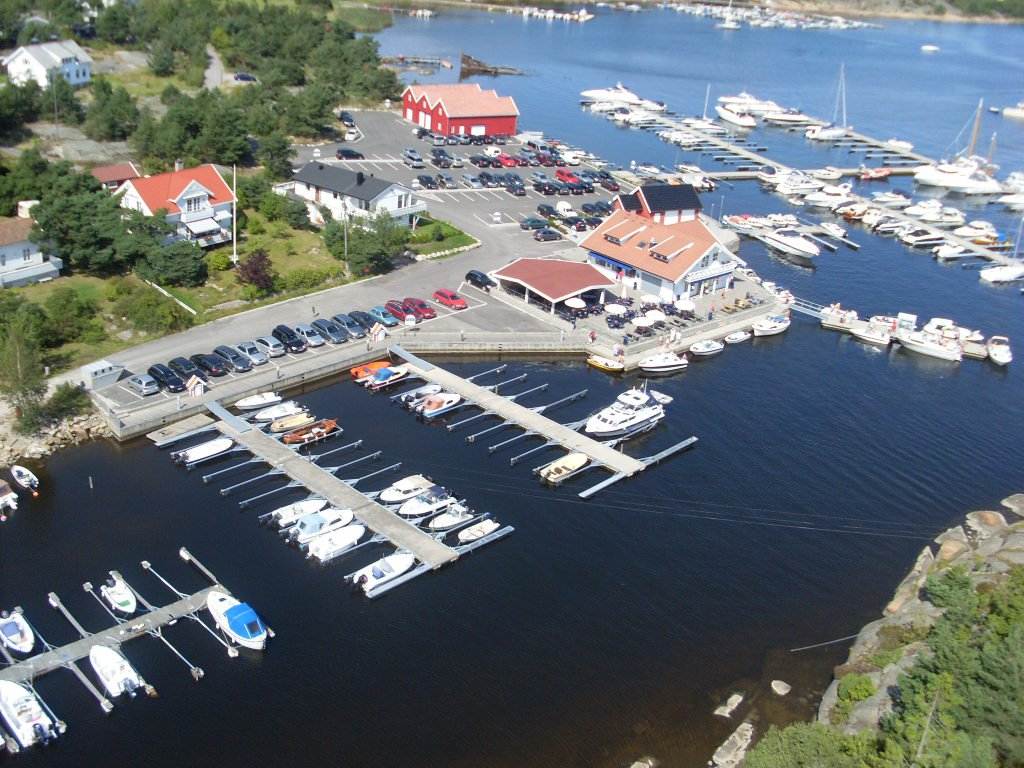
- Marina on Hvaler

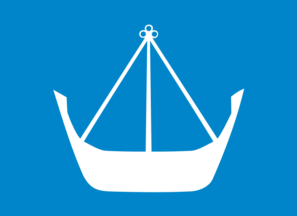
- Flag Coat of arms

- Østfold within Norway

- Hvaler within Østfold
- Coordinates: 59°3′23″N 11°1′20″E
- Country: Norway
- County: Østfold
- Administrative centre: Skjærhalden

Government
  - Mayor (2007): Eivind N. Borge (Frp)

Area
  - Total: 90 km^{2} (35 sq mi)
  - Land: 89 km^{2} (34 sq mi)
  - Rank: #393 in Norway

Population (2017)
  - Total: 4,517
  - Rank: #241 in Norway
  - Density: 50/km^{2} (130/sq mi)
  - Change (10 years): ▲ +9.8%
- Demonym: Hvalersokning

Official language
  - Norwegian form: Bokmål
- Time zone: UTC+01:00 (CET)
  - Summer (DST): UTC+02:00 (CEST)
- ISO 3166 code: NO-3110
- Website: Official website

Hvaler is a municipality that is a group of islands in the southern part of Østfold County, Norway. The administrative centre of the municipality is the village of Skjærhalden, on the island of Kirkeøy. The only police station in the municipality is located in Skjærhalden. Hvaler was established as a municipality on 1 January 1838 (see formannskapsdistrikt).

== Name ==
The name is the plural form of hval, which means "whale". The form and shape of the islands resemble a pod of whales. Prior to 1889, the name was spelled "Hvaløerne", meaning the whale isles.

== Coat-of-arms ==
The coat-of-arms is from modern times. It was granted on 9 December 1983. The arms show a silver-colored boat on a blue background. This boat is the type that was typical in the 13th century. This was chosen since this island municipality has been dependent on boats for all its history, and because fisheries and sailing have been the main economic activities for many centuries.

== Culture ==
Hvalerdrakten is the traditional costume or bunad for women in Hvaler. The bodice and skirt are blue or black and are made from 100% wool. The shirt is white and made from 100% cotton. Several symbolic expressions exist in the embroideries and the accompanying silver brooches. The embroidered flowers are characteristic to the islands' flora and symbolize the different islands that constitute the municipality. All the silver that belongs to the costume is portraying the locally famous Hvalerbåten (The Boat of Hvaler) and herring, which has been an important commodity to the islands through the ages. All patterns used in this costume have been patented. Since 1999, hvalerdrakten have been manufactured by Hvalerdraktstua AS.

== Hvaler Church ==
Hvaler Church (Hvaler Kirke) is a medieval-era church, probably begun around 1000-1100 AD. Hvaler Church is the main church of the archipelago. It is located on Kirkeøy in the extreme south of the parish. It is a stone church with a rectangular nave and narrow choir and apse. The pulpit is from the 1600s. In 1750, the church received a new altar which in 1759 was supplemented with an altarpiece mounted on the altar. Between 1953 and 1955, the church went through a thorough restoration led by antiquarian Håkon Christie in connection with the church's restoration. The J. H. Jorgensen organ is from 1955.

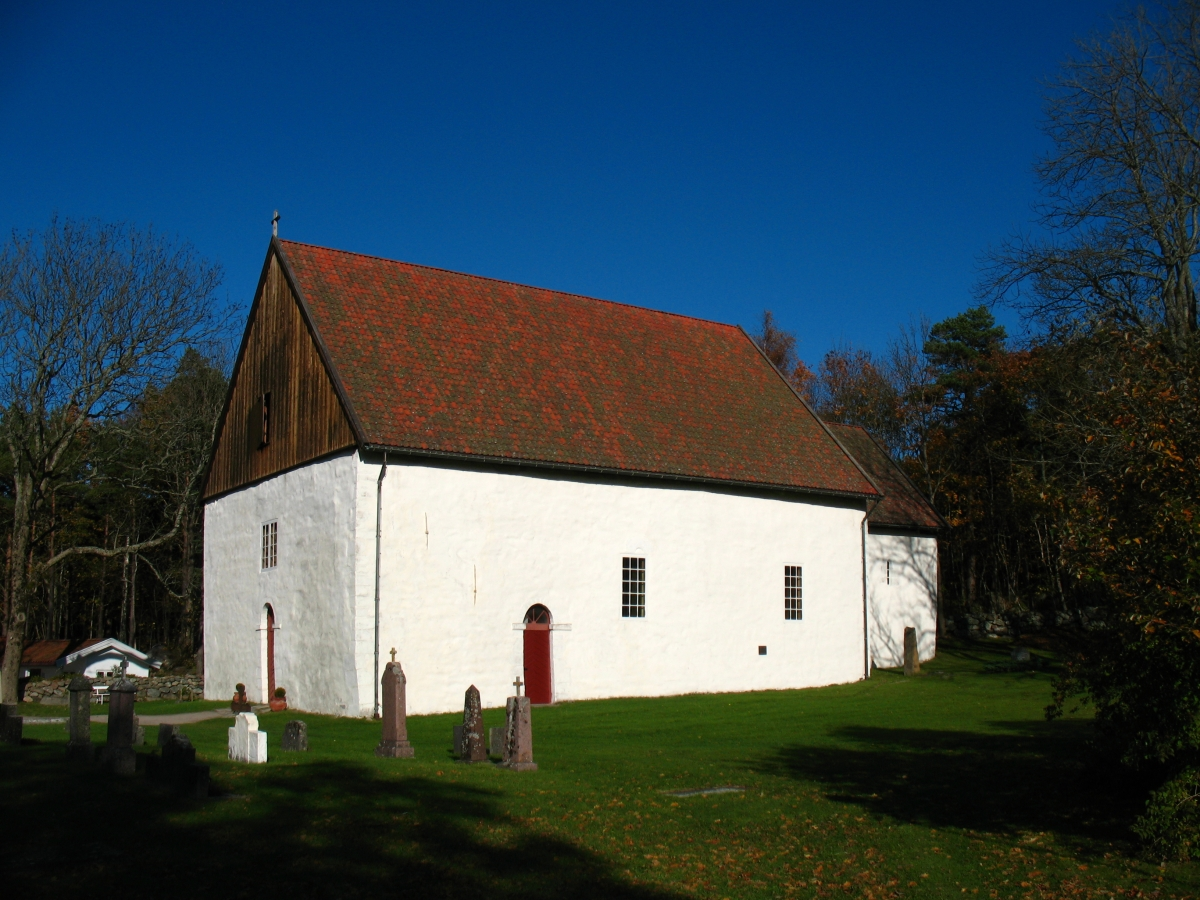
Hvaler Church

== Geography ==
South of Skjærhalden lies a chain of a few inhabitable islands and several hundreds of smaller islands and rocks. The bigger islands are named, clockwise, Nordre Sandøy, Søndre Sandøy, Hærføl, Søndre Lauer, and Nordre Lauer. Another smaller island is Tisler. On all of these islands, with the exception of Søndre Lauer, summer houses fill the landscape. The islands of Søndre Sandøy and Hærføl are the two only islands that have local shops and roads which support car traffic.

Nordre Sandøy, situated on the north end of this chain of islands in southern Hvaler, is one of the largest islands with a distinct flora and fauna diversity. Although equipped with a good stretch of roads, car traffic is forbidden there and no commercial activity whatsoever exists. In many ways, this gives its population (mostly summertime vacationers) a greater feeling of isolation from the average Norwegian's hectic life, and it acts as a buffer against pollution. Nordre Sandøy is thought to have been one of the bases of Peter Tordenskjold during his time as a privateer. One of the bays on the island is named "Tordenskjoldsbukta" (Norwegian: Bay of Tordenskjold). The remains of two dead pirates have been found on the island. Legend has it that he buried some of his treasure on the island. In 1997, a local boy, Simon Rene Magnussen, found three old golden coins while scuba diving in the area.

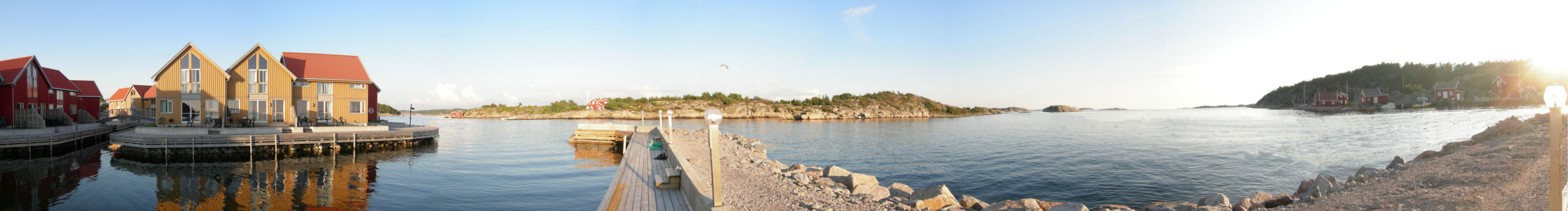
Panorama of Skjærhalden harbor

Number of minorities (1st and 2nd generation) in Hvaler by country of origin in 2017
Ancestry	Number
Poland	34
Afghanistan	31
Denmark	19

== Notable people ==
- Henry Larsen (1899-1964), Norwegian-Canadian Arctic explorer, born on Herføl
- Egil Abrahamsen (born 1923 in Hvaler, died 2023), Norwegian ships engineer
- Vebjørn Sand (born 1966 in Bærum), Norwegian painter and artist who was brought up in Hvaler
